= Wrestling at the 2008 Summer Olympics – Qualification =

This article details the Wrestling at the 2008 Summer Olympics qualifying phase.

Seven places have been reserved for the host nation China. The remaining spots are allocated through the qualification process, wherein the athletes earn places for their respective nation. FILA also determined that at the continental championships, only nations which entered an athlete at each weight class at the 2007 World Championships in Baku, Azerbaijan were eligible to qualify their nation for the Olympics at that weight.

== Timeline ==
Event		Date	Venue
2007 World Championships		September 17–23, 2007	Baku, Azerbaijan
2008 Continental Championships	Oceania	February 8–10, 2008	Canberra, Australia
2008 Continental Championships	Pan American	February 29 – March 2, 2008	Colorado Springs, United States
2008 Continental Championships	Africa	March 7–9, 2008	Tunis, Tunisia
2008 Continental Championships	Asia	March 18–23, 2008	Jeju City, South Korea
2008 Continental Championships	Europe	April 1–6, 2008	Tampere, Finland
1st Qualification Tournaments	Freestyle	April 18–20, 2008	Martigny, Switzerland
1st Qualification Tournaments	Greco-Roman	May 9–11, 2008	Rome, Italy
1st Qualification Tournaments	Women	May 16–17, 2008	Edmonton, Canada
2nd Qualification Tournaments	Freestyle	May 2–4, 2008	Warsaw, Poland
2nd Qualification Tournaments	Greco-Roman	May 23–25, 2008	Novi Sad, Serbia
2nd Qualification Tournaments	Women	May 31 – June 1, 2008	Haparanda, Sweden

== Qualification summary ==
NOC	Men's freestyle							Men's Greco-Roman							Women's freestyle				Total
NOC	55	60	66	74	84	96	120	55	60	66	74	84	96	120	48	55	63	72	Total
Albania		X											X						2
Algeria										X	X		X						3
Armenia		X	X		X			X	X	X	X	X		X					9
Australia				X	X						X				X				4
Azerbaijan	X	X	X	X	X	X	X	X	X	X	X	X		X	X	X	X		16
Belarus	X		X	X					X	X	X			X		X	X		9
Brazil																		X	1
Bulgaria	X		X	X			X	X	X	X	X		X	X			X	X	12
Cameroon																		X	1
Canada		X	X	X	X	X								X	X	X	X	X	10
China		X	X	X	X		X	X	X	X	X	X	X	X	X	X	X	X	16
Colombia	X				X											X			3
Cuba	X	X	X	X	X	X	X	X	X	X		X		X					12
Czech Republic													X						1
Denmark								X			X								2
Egypt		X				X		X	X				X	X			X		7
El Salvador															X				1
Finland									X										1
France						X			X	X	X	X		X	X		X	X	9
Georgia	X		X	X	X	X		X	X		X	X	X						10
Germany					X	X				X	X		X		X			X	7
Greece				X									X	X					3
Guam																	X		1
Guinea-Bissau				X															1
Hungary				X		X	X			X	X	X	X	X			X		9
India		X	X				X												3
Iran	X	X	X	X	X	X	X	X		X		X	X	X					12
Italy												X	X						2
Japan	X	X	X						X			X	X		X	X	X	X	10
Kazakhstan	X	X	X		X	X	X	X	X	X	X	X	X		X	X	X	X	16
Kyrgyzstan		X		X		X			X	X									5
Lithuania										X	X		X	X					4
Macedonia		X																	1
Mexico							X												1
Moldova						X										X			2
Mongolia	X		X		X										X	X	X		6
Nigeria							X											X	2
North Korea	X		X					X											3
Norway									X										1
Palau							X	X											2
Peru											X								1
Poland				X	X	X	X				X	X		X			X	X	9
Romania	X			X			X	X	X	X					X	X			8
Russia	X	X	X	X	X	X	X	X	X	X	X	X	X	X	X	X	X	X	18
Senegal	X																		1
Serbia								X	X										2
Slovakia							X					X							2
South Africa			X																1
South Korea	X	X	X	X			X	X	X	X		X	X		X				11
Spain	X																X	X	3
Sweden												X		X	X	X		X	5
Switzerland			X																1
Tajikistan		X			X														2
Tunisia					X							X				X			3
Turkey	X	X	X	X	X	X	X		X	X	X	X	X	X					13
Ukraine		X	X	X	X	X	X	X		X	X	X	X	X	X	X	X	X	16
United States	X	X	X	X	X	X	X	X		X	X	X	X	X	X	X	X	X	17
Uzbekistan	X			X	X	X	X	X	X					X					8
Venezuela						X									X	X			3
Total: 59 NOCs	19	19	21	21	20	19	20	19	20	20	20	20	20	20	17	16	17	16	344

== Men's freestyle events ==
=== 55 kg ===
Competition	Places	Qualified wrestlers
2007 World Championships	8	Besik Kudukhov (RUS); Bayaraagiin Naranbaatar (MGL); Rizvan Gadzhiev (BLR); Andy Moreno (CUB); Sezar Akgül (TUR); Dilshod Mansurov (UZB); Fredy Serrano (COL); Zhassulan Mukhtarbekuly (KAZ)
2008 Oceania Championships (Note: Seven quotas (sex not specified) were allocated to the 2008 Oceania Championships.)	0	—
2008 Pan American Championships	1	Henry Cejudo (USA)
2008 African Championships	1	Adama Diatta (SEN)
2008 Asian Championships	1	Tomohiro Matsunaga (JPN)
2008 European Championships	1	Francisco Sánchez (ESP)
1st World Qualification Tournament	4	Radoslav Velikov (BUL); Kim Hyo-sub (KOR); Namig Sevdimov (AZE); Abbas Dabbaghi (IRI)
2nd World Qualification Tournament	3	Yang Kyong-il (PRK); Besarion Gochashvili (GEO); Petru Toarcă (ROU)
Invitational / Host Country	0	—
Total	19	

=== 60 kg ===
Competition	Places	Qualified wrestlers
2007 World Championships	~~(8)~~ 7	Mavlet Batirov (RUS); ~~Anatolie Guidea (BUL)~~ (Note: On 9 August 2008, Anatolie Guidea ruptured his Achilles tendon and could not compete in the event. The Bulgarian Wrestling Federation has asked another Bulgarian wrestler, Ismail Redzhep, to replace Guidia, but he was involved in a car accident, prompting him not to compete. Eventually, the freed spot was taken by Mike Zadick from the United States.); Bazar Bazarguruev (KGZ); Sahit Prizreni (ALB); Tevfik Odabaşı (TUR); Qin He (CHN); Samat Zhakupov (KAZ); Murad Ramazanov (MKD)
2008 Oceania Championships	0	—
2008 Pan American Championships	1	Guivi Sissaouri (CAN)
2008 African Championships	1	Hassan Madani (EGY)
2008 Asian Championships	1	Yogeshwar Dutt (IND)
2008 European Championships	1	Vasyl Fedoryshyn (UKR)
1st World Qualification Tournament	4	Yandro Quintana (CUB); Zelimkhan Huseynov (AZE); Vitaly Koryakin (TJK); Morad Mohammadi (IRI)
2nd World Qualification Tournament	3	Kenichi Yumoto (JPN); Kim Jong-dae (KOR); Martin Berberyan (ARM)
Invitational / Host Country	1	Mike Zadick (USA)
Total	19	

=== 66 kg ===
Competition	Places	Qualified wrestlers
2007 World Championships	8	Ramazan Şahin (TUR); Geandry Garzón (CUB); Otar Tushishvili (GEO); Irbek Farniev (RUS); Doug Schwab (USA); Andriy Stadnik (UKR); Sushil Kumar (IND); Buyanjavyn Batzorig (MGL)
2008 Oceania Championships	0	—
2008 Pan American Championships	1	Haislan Garcia (CAN)
2008 African Championships	1	Heinrich Barnes (RSA)
2008 Asian Championships	1	Kazuhiko Ikematsu (JPN)
2008 European Championships	1	Emin Azizov (AZE)
1st World Qualification Tournament	4	Mehdi Taghavi (IRI); Serafim Barzakov (BUL); Albert Batyrov (BLR); Suren Markosyan (ARM)
2nd World Qualification Tournament	3	Yang Chun-song (PRK); Leonid Spiridonov (KAZ); Jung Young-ho (KOR)
Invitational / Host Country	2	Wang Qiang (CHN); Grégory Sarrasin (SUI) (Note: Péter Módos withdrew from the Olympics for medical reasons only few days before the competition, the quota went to the freestyle wrestler Grégory Sarrasin from Switzerland.)
Total	21	

=== 74 kg ===
Competition	Places	Qualified wrestlers
2007 World Championships	8	Makhach Murtazaliev (RUS); Ibragim Aldatov (UKR); Iván Fundora (CUB); Chamsulvara Chamsulvarayev (AZE); Gheorghiță Ștefan (ROU); Joe Heskett (USA); Gábor Hatos (HUN); Gela Saghirashvili (GEO)
2008 Oceania Championships	1	Ali Abdo (AUS)
2008 Pan American Championships	1	Matt Gentry (CAN)
2008 African Championships	1	Augusto Midana (GBS) (Note: Richard Addinall from South Africa originally won the quota as the highest ranked eligible wrestler, but South Africa rejected the quota, therefore the quota went to Augusto Midana, the next best eligible wrestler.)
2008 Asian Championships	1	Cho Byung-kwan (KOR)
2008 European Championships	1	Murad Gaidarov (BLR)
1st World Qualification Tournament	4	Soslan Tigiev (UZB); Ali Asghar Bazri (IRI); Krystian Brzozowski (POL); Kiril Terziev (BUL)
2nd World Qualification Tournament	3	Arsen Gitinov (KGZ); Ahmet Gülhan (TUR); Emzarios Bentinidis (GRE)
Invitational / Host Country	1	Siriguleng (CHN)
Total	21	

=== 84 kg ===
Competition	Places	Qualified wrestlers
2007 World Championships	8	Georgy Ketoev (RUS); Yusup Abdusalomov (TJK); Zaurbek Sokhiev (UZB); Reza Yazdani (IRI); Serhat Balcı (TUR); Joe Williams (USA); Davyd Bichinashvili (GER); Travis Cross (CAN)
2008 Oceania Championships	1	Sandeep Kumar (AUS)
2008 Pan American Championships	1	Jarlis Mosquera (COL)
2008 African Championships	1	Adnan Rhimi (TUN)
2008 Asian Championships	1	Wang Ying (CHN)
2008 European Championships	1	Revaz Mindorashvili (GEO)
1st World Qualification Tournament	4	Novruz Temrezov (AZE); Chagnaadorjiin Ganzorig (MGL); Harutyun Yenokyan (ARM); Roilandi Zúñiga (CUB)
2nd World Qualification Tournament	3	Taras Danko (UKR); Gennadiy Laliyev (KAZ); Radosław Horbik (POL)
Invitational / Host Country	0	—
Total	20	

=== 96 kg ===
Competition	Places	Qualified wrestlers
2007 World Championships	8	Khadzhimurat Gatsalov (RUS); Saeid Ebrahimi (IRI); Kurban Kurbanov (UZB); Daniel Cormier (USA); Hakan Koç (TUR); Aleksey Krupnyakov (KGZ); Vasyl Tesmynetskyi (UKR); Stefan Kehrer (GER)
2008 Oceania Championships	0	—
2008 Pan American Championships	1	Michel Batista (CUB)
2008 African Championships	1	Saleh Emara (EGY)
2008 Asian Championships	1	Daulet Shabanbay (KAZ)
2008 European Championships	1	Giorgi Gogshelidze (GEO)
1st World Qualification Tournament	4	Khetag Gazyumov (AZE); Nicolae Ceban (MDA); David Zilberman (CAN); Luis Vivenes (VEN)
2nd World Qualification Tournament	3	Vincent Aka-Akesse (FRA); Gergely Kiss (HUN); Mateusz Gucman (POL)
Invitational / Host Country	0	—
Total	19	

=== 120 kg ===
Competition	Places	Qualified wrestlers
2007 World Championships	8	Bilyal Makhov (RUS); Alexis Rodríguez (CUB); Vadim Tasoyev (UKR); Artur Taymazov (UZB); Fatih Çakıroğlu (TUR); Tommy Rowlands (USA); Go Soung-jin (KOR); Bozhidar Boyadzhiev (BUL)
2008 Oceania Championships	1	Florian Skilang Temengil (PLW)
2008 Pan American Championships	1	Lawrence Langowski (MEX)
2008 African Championships	1	Wilson Siewari (NGR)
2008 Asian Championships	1	Fardin Masoumi (IRI)
2008 European Championships	1	Ali Isayev (AZE) (Note: Davit Modzmanashvili from Georgia originally earned the quota, but tested positive for a banned substance.)
1st World Qualification Tournament	4	David Musuľbes (SVK); Rajiv Tomar (IND); Bartłomiej Bartnicki (POL); Marid Mutalimov (KAZ)
2nd World Qualification Tournament	3	Liang Lei (CHN); Ottó Aubéli (HUN); Rareș Chintoan (ROU)
Invitational / Host Country	0	—
Total	20	

== Men's Greco-Roman events ==
=== 55 kg ===
Competition	Places	Qualified wrestlers
2007 World Championships	8	Hamid Sourian (IRI); Park Eun-chul (KOR); Nazyr Mankiev (RUS); Kristijan Fris (SRB); Ildar Hafizov (UZB); Lindsey Durlacher (USA); Virgil Munteanu (ROU); Anders Nyblom (DEN)
2008 Oceania Championships	1	Elgin Loren Elwais (PLW)
2008 Pan American Championships	1	Yagnier Hernández (CUB)
2008 African Championships	1	Mostafa Mohamed (EGY) (Note: Maher Bouthouri from Tunisia originally earned the quota as the highest ranked eligible wrestler, but Tunisia rejected the quota, the next NOC South Africa also rejected it. with no more eligible wrestlers left, the quota went to the 2008 African Champion from Egypt.)
2008 Asian Championships	1	Cha Kwang-su (PRK)
2008 European Championships	1	Rovshan Bayramov (AZE)
1st World Qualification Tournament	4	Jiao Huafeng (CHN); Aleksandar Kostadinov (BUL); Lasha Gogitadze (GEO); Roman Amoyan (ARM)
2nd World Qualification Tournament	~~(3)~~ 2	Asset Imanbayev (KAZ); Yuriy Koval (UKR); ~~Péter Módos (HUN)~~
Invitational / Host Country	0	—
Total	19	

=== 60 kg ===
Competition	Places	Qualified wrestlers
2007 World Championships	8	David Bedinadze (GEO); Makoto Sasamoto (JPN); Jung Ji-hyun (KOR); Eusebiu Diaconu (ROU); Yury Dubinin (BLR); Jarkko Ala-Huikku (FIN); Nurbakyt Tengizbayev (KAZ); Islambek Albiev (RUS)
2008 Oceania Championships	0	—
2008 Pan American Championships	1	Roberto Monzón (CUB)
2008 African Championships	1	Ashraf El-Gharably (EGY)
2008 Asian Championships	1	Ruslan Tyumenbayev (KGZ)
2008 European Championships	1	Armen Nazaryan (BUL)
1st World Qualification Tournament	4	Davor Štefanek (SRB); Dilshod Aripov (UZB); Vitaliy Rahimov (AZE); Soner Sucu (TUR)
2nd World Qualification Tournament	3	Sébastien Hidalgo (FRA); Stig-André Berge (NOR); Karen Mnatsakanyan (ARM)
Invitational / Host Country	1	Sheng Jiang (CHN)
Total	20	

=== 66 kg ===
Competition	Places	Qualified wrestlers
2007 World Championships	8	Farid Mansurov (AZE); Steeve Guénot (FRA); Nikolay Gergov (BUL); Justin Lester (USA); Arman Adikyan (ARM); Tamás Lőrincz (HUN); Darkhan Bayakhmetov (KAZ); Oleksandr Khvoshch (UKR)
2008 Oceania Championships	0	—
2008 Pan American Championships	1	Alain Milián (CUB)
2008 African Championships	1	Mohamed Serir (ALG)
2008 Asian Championships	1	Kim Min-chul (KOR)
2008 European Championships	1	Ion Panait (ROU)
1st World Qualification Tournament	4	Sergey Kovalenko (RUS); Ali Mohammadi (IRI); Mikhail Siamionau (BLR); Kanatbek Begaliev (KGZ)
2nd World Qualification Tournament	3	Şeref Eroğlu (TUR); Aleksandr Kazakevič (LTU); Markus Thätner (GER)
Invitational / Host Country	1	Li Yanyan (CHN)
Total	20	

=== 74 kg ===
Competition	Places	Qualified wrestlers
2007 World Championships	8	Yavor Yanakiev (BUL); Mark Madsen (DEN); Valdemaras Venckaitis (LTU); Christophe Guénot (FRA); Roman Melyoshin (KAZ); Julian Kwit (POL); Péter Bácsi (HUN); Konstantin Schneider (GER)
2008 Oceania Championships	1	Hassan Shahsavan (AUS)
2008 Pan American Championships	1	Sixto Barrera (PER)
2008 African Championships	1	Messaoud Zeghdane (ALG)
2008 Asian Championships	1	Chang Yongxiang (CHN)
2008 European Championships	1	Şeref Tüfenk (TUR)
1st World Qualification Tournament	4	Manuchar Kvirkvelia (GEO); Ilgar Abdulov (AZE); Varteres Samurgashev (RUS); T. C. Dantzler (USA)
2nd World Qualification Tournament	3	Volodymyr Shatskykh (UKR); Aliaksandr Kikiniou (BLR); Arsen Julfalakyan (ARM)
Invitational / Host Country	0	—
Total	20	

=== 84 kg ===
Competition	Places	Qualified wrestlers
2007 World Championships	8	Aleksey Mishin (RUS); Brad Vering (USA); Saman Tahmasebi (IRI); Badri Khasaia (GEO); Kim Jung-sub (KOR); Ara Abrahamian (SWE); Nazmi Avluca (TUR); Zoltán Fodor (HUN)
2008 Oceania Championships	0	—
2008 Pan American Championships	1	Yunior Estrada (CUB)
2008 African Championships	1	Haykel Achouri (TUN)
2008 Asian Championships	1	Shingo Matsumoto (JPN)
2008 European Championships	1	Andrea Minguzzi (ITA)
1st World Qualification Tournament	4	Mélonin Noumonvi (FRA); Andrey Samokhin (KAZ); Artur Michalkiewicz (POL); Oleksandr Daragan (UKR)
2nd World Qualification Tournament	3	Shalva Gadabadze (AZE); Attila Bátky (SVK); Denis Forov (ARM)
Invitational / Host Country	1	Ma Sanyi (CHN)
Total	20	

=== 96 kg ===
Competition	Places	Qualified wrestlers
2007 World Championships	8	Ramaz Nozadze (GEO); Mindaugas Ežerskis (LTU); Ghasem Rezaei (IRI); Marek Švec (CZE); Kenzo Kato (JPN); Daigoro Timoncini (ITA); Elis Guri (ALB); Asset Mambetov (KAZ)
2008 Oceania Championships	0	—
2008 Pan American Championships	1	Justin Ruiz (USA)
2008 African Championships	1	Samir Bouguerra (ALG)
2008 Asian Championships	1	Han Tae-young (KOR)
2008 European Championships	1	Aslanbek Khushtov (RUS)
1st World Qualification Tournament	4	Kaloyan Dinchev (BUL); Lajos Virág (HUN); Oleg Kryoka (UKR); Mehmet Özal (TUR)
2nd World Qualification Tournament	3	Karam Gaber (EGY); Theodoros Tounousidis (GRE); Mirko Englich (GER)
Invitational / Host Country	1	Jiang Huachen (CHN)
Total	20	

=== 120 kg ===
Competition	Places	Qualified wrestlers
2007 World Championships	8	Mijaín López (CUB); Khasan Baroev (RUS); Dremiel Byers (USA); Yury Patrikeyev (ARM); Yannick Szczepaniak (FRA); Mihály Deák-Bárdos (HUN); Ioseb Chugoshvili (BLR); Davyd Saldadze (UZB)
2008 Oceania Championships	0	—
2008 Pan American Championships	1	Ari Taub (CAN)
2008 African Championships	1	Yasser Sakr (EGY)
2008 Asian Championships	1	Masoud Hashemzadeh (IRI)
2008 European Championships	1	Atilla Güzel (TUR)
1st World Qualification Tournament	4	Panagiotis Papadopoulos (GRE); Mindaugas Mizgaitis (LTU); Marek Mikulski (POL); Anton Botev (AZE)
2nd World Qualification Tournament	3	Jalmar Sjöberg (SWE); Oleksandr Chernetskyi (UKR); Ivan Ivanov (BUL)
Invitational / Host Country	1	Liu Deli (CHN)
Total	20	

== Women's freestyle events ==
=== 48 kg ===
Competition	Places	Qualified wrestlers
2007 World Championships	8	Chiharu Icho (JPN); Iryna Merleni (UKR); Mayelis Caripá (VEN); Li Xiaomei (CHN); Carol Huynh (CAN); Stephanie Murata (USA); Mariya Stadnik (AZE) (Note: The Court of Arbitration for Sport decided that all results obtained by Stadnik between 26 April 2006 and 25 April 2008 must be disqualified, however Azerbaijan was allowed to keep the quota.); Sofia Mattsson (SWE)
2008 Oceania Championships	1	Kyla Bremner (AUS)
2008 Pan American Championships	1	Íngrid Medrano (ESA)
2008 African Championships	~~(1)~~ 0	~~Naziha Hamza (TUN)~~ (Note: Tunisia rejected the quota, the quota went to the last world qualification tournament.)
2008 Asian Championships	1	Tsogtbazaryn Enkhjargal (MGL)
2008 European Championships	1	Vanessa Boubryemm (FRA)
1st World Qualification Tournament	2	Elza Tazetdinova (RUS); Kim Hyung-joo (KOR)
2nd World Qualification Tournament	~~(2)~~ 3	Tatyana Bakatyuk (KAZ); Estera Dobre (ROU); Alexandra Engelhardt (GER)
Invitational / Host Country	0	—
Total	17	

=== 55 kg ===
Competition	Places	Qualified wrestlers
2007 World Championships	8	Saori Yoshida (JPN); Ida-Theres Karlsson (SWE); Natalia Golts (RUS); Olga Smirnova (KAZ); Tetyana Lazareva (UKR); Alena Filipava (BLR); Jackeline Rentería (COL); Yuliya Ratkevich (AZE)
2008 Oceania Championships	0	—
2008 Pan American Championships	1	Tonya Verbeek (CAN)
2008 African Championships	1	Marwa Amri (TUN)
2008 Asian Championships	1	Xu Li (CHN)
2008 European Championships	1	Ludmila Cristea (MDA)
1st World Qualification Tournament	2	Marcia Andrades (VEN); Marcie Van Dusen (USA)
2nd World Qualification Tournament	2	Ana Maria Pavăl (ROU); Naidangiin Otgonjargal (MGL)
Invitational / Host Country	0	—
Total	16	

=== 63 kg ===
Competition	Places	Qualified wrestlers
2007 World Championships	8	Kaori Icho (JPN); Yelena Shalygina (KAZ); Sara McMann (USA); Monika Rogien (POL); Lise Legrand (FRA); Yuliya Ostapchuk (UKR); Olesya Zamula (AZE); Xu Haiyan (CHN)
2008 Oceania Championships	1	Maria Dunn (GUM)
2008 Pan American Championships	1	Martine Dugrenier (CAN)
2008 African Championships	1	Haiat Farag (EGY)
2008 Asian Championships	1	Badrakhyn Odonchimeg (MGL)
2008 European Championships	1	Alena Kartashova (RUS)
1st World Qualification Tournament	2	Volha Khilko (BLR); María Teresa Méndez (ESP)
2nd World Qualification Tournament	2	Elina Vaseva (BUL); Marianna Sastin (HUN)
Invitational / Host Country	0	—
Total	17	

=== 72 kg ===
Competition	Places	Qualified wrestlers
2007 World Championships	8	Stanka Zlateva (BUL); Kristie Marano (USA); Guzel Manyurova (RUS); Olga Zhanibekova (KAZ); Maider Unda (ESP); Wang Xu (CHN); Jenny Fransson (SWE); Svetlana Saenko (UKR)
2008 Oceania Championships	0	—
2008 Pan American Championships	1	Ohenewa Akuffo (CAN)
2008 African Championships	1	Annabelle Ali (CMR) (Note: Sabrine Mathlouthi from Tunisia originally won the quota as the highest ranked eligible wrestler, but Tunisia rejected the quota, therefore the quota went to Annabelle Ali, the next best eligible wrestler.)
2008 Asian Championships	1	Kyoko Hamaguchi (JPN)
2008 European Championships	1	Anita Schätzle (GER)
1st World Qualification Tournament	2	Agnieszka Wieszczek (POL); Rosângela Conceição (BRA)
2nd World Qualification Tournament	2	Amarachi Obiajunwa (NGR); Audrey Prieto (FRA)
Invitational / Host Country	0	—
Total	16	
