= 2007 World Wrestling Championships – Men's freestyle 84 kg =

Men's freestyle 84 kg at the 2007 World Championships
- Venue: Heydar Aliyev Sports and Concert Complex
- Dates: 20 September 2007
- Competitors: 46 from 46 nations

Medalists
gold medal	Georgy Ketoev	Russia
silver medal	Yusup Abdusalomov	Tajikistan
bronze medal	Zaurbek Sokhiev	Uzbekistan
bronze medal	Reza Yazdani	Iran

The men's freestyle 84 kilograms is a competition featured at the 2007 World Wrestling Championships, and was held at the Heydar Aliyev Sports and Concert Complex in Baku, Azerbaijan on 20 September 2007.

== Results ==
Legend

- F — Won by fall

=== Finals ===
Semifinals				Final
Serhat Balcı (TUR)	1	1	2
Yusup Abdusalomov (TJK)	0	1	4	Yusup Abdusalomov (TJK)	0	0
Reza Yazdani (IRI)	0	1		Georgy Ketoev (RUS)	2	1
Georgy Ketoev (RUS)	3	3

=== Top half ===
==== Section 1 ====
Round of 64

Round of 32
Gennadiy Laliyev (KAZ)	6	3
Joseph Ntege (UGA)	0	0
Coenraad de Villiers (RSA)	0	0
Imants Lagodskis (LAT)	3	6^{F}
Sergey Kolesnikov (ISR)	0	0
Serhat Balcı (TUR)	2	2
Miroslav Guechev (BUL)	1	1
Ram Vir (IND)	0	0

Round of 16
Gennadiy Laliyev (KAZ)	7	2
Imants Lagodskis (LAT)	1	1
Serhat Balcı (TUR)	1	3
Miroslav Guechev (BUL)	0	0

Quarterfinals
Gennadiy Laliyev (KAZ)	3	1	1
Serhat Balcı (TUR)	3	3	3

==== Section 2 ====
Round of 64

Round of 32
Zaurbek Sokhiev (UZB)	0	3	0
Yusup Abdusalomov (TJK)	1	3	1
Rodrigo Piedrahíta (COL)	0	0
Lee Du-soo (KOR)	6	6
Adnan Rhimi (TUN)	0	1
Lazaros Loizidis (GRE)	7	6^{F}
Adrian Jaoude (BRA)	0	0
Chagnaadorjiin Ganzorig (MGL)	1	2

Round of 16
Yusup Abdusalomov (TJK)	4	7
Lee Du-soo (KOR)	0	0
Lazaros Loizidis (GRE)	2	5
Chagnaadorjiin Ganzorig (MGL)	1	0

Quarterfinals
Yusup Abdusalomov (TJK)	3	0	3
Lazaros Loizidis (GRE)	0	3	0

=== Bottom half ===
==== Section 3 ====
Round of 64
Jeff Cobb (GUM)	5	0
Sandeep Kumar (AUS)	6	2
Travis Cross (CAN)	5	3
Stephen Hill (NZL)	0	0
Novruz Temrezov (AZE)	0	1	2
Revaz Mindorashvili (GEO)	1	0	1
Reza Yazdani (IRI)	1	2
Vadim Laliev (ARM)	0	1
Roilandi Zúñiga (CUB)	2	3
Kantemyr Gagiyev (UKR)	1	2
Yutaka Suzuki (JPN)	0	0
Radosław Horbik (POL)	2	1

Round of 32
David Fukwabo (COD)	8	1	0
Ablaye Thiam (SEN)	1	1	4
Sandeep Kumar (AUS)	0	0
Travis Cross (CAN)	7	6
Novruz Temrezov (AZE)	1	1	0
Reza Yazdani (IRI)	0	2	1
Roilandi Zúñiga (CUB)	3	3
Radosław Horbik (POL)	0	1

Round of 16
Ablaye Thiam (SEN)	0	0
Travis Cross (CAN)	1	1
Reza Yazdani (IRI)	2	1
Roilandi Zúñiga (CUB)	0	0

Quarterfinals
Travis Cross (CAN)	1	0	1
Reza Yazdani (IRI)	0	1	2

==== Section 4 ====
Round of 64
Manuel García (PUR)	3	0	1
Daniyar Samsaliev (KGZ)	1	3	0
Jason Rolle (BAH)	0	0
Felix Polianidis (CYP)	4	7^{F}
Hasan Fadhel (IRQ)	0	0
Davyd Bichinashvili (GER)	2	2
Wang Ying (CHN)	3	0
Georgy Ketoev (RUS)	6	4
Thomas Bucheli (SUI)	0	0
Joe Williams (USA)	1	3
Árpád Ritter (HUN)	2	1
Adrian Recorean (ROU)	0	0
Piotr Ianulov (MDA)	3	2
Dejan Bogdanov (MKD)	0	0
Soslan Gattsiev (BLR)	5^{F}
Larry Uwelur (FSM)	0

Round of 32
Manuel García (PUR)	0	0
Felix Polianidis (CYP)	2	4
Davyd Bichinashvili (GER)	0	1
Georgy Ketoev (RUS)	3	2
Joe Williams (USA)	2	0	1
Árpád Ritter (HUN)	0	1	0
Piotr Ianulov (MDA)	2	2	2
Soslan Gattsiev (BLR)	1	2	4

Round of 16
Felix Polianidis (CYP)	1	1
Georgy Ketoev (RUS)	4	4
Joe Williams (USA)	1	6
Soslan Gattsiev (BLR)	0	0

Quarterfinals
Georgy Ketoev (RUS)	4	4
Joe Williams (USA)	0	0

=== Repechage ===
Repechage round 1
Wang Ying (CHN)	0	0
Davyd Bichinashvili (GER)	3	4^{F}

Repechage round 2
Zaurbek Sokhiev (UZB)	3	1
Lee Du-soo (KOR)	0	0
Davyd Bichinashvili (GER)	1	1
Felix Polianidis (CYP)	0	0

Repechage round 3
Zaurbek Sokhiev (UZB)	3	3
Lazaros Loizidis (GRE)	0	0
Davyd Bichinashvili (GER)	0	1	0
Joe Williams (USA)	1	0	1

Bronze medals
Zaurbek Sokhiev (UZB)	3	1	3
Serhat Balcı (TUR)	1	2	3
Joe Williams (USA)	0	0
Reza Yazdani (IRI)	1	3
