= 2006 World Wrestling Championships – Men's freestyle 84 kg =

Men's freestyle 84 kg at the 2006 World Championships
- Venue: Tianhe Gymnasium
- Dates: 28 September 2006
- Competitors: 31 from 31 nations

Medalists
gold medal	Sazhid Sazhidov	Russia
silver medal	Revaz Mindorashvili	Georgia
bronze medal	Reza Yazdani	Iran
bronze medal	Zaurbek Sokhiev	Uzbekistan

The men's freestyle 84 kilograms is a competition featured at the 2006 World Wrestling Championships, and was held at the Tianhe Gymnasium in Guangzhou, China on 28 September 2006.

This freestyle wrestling competition consists of a single-elimination tournament, with a repechage used to determine the winner of two bronze medals.

== Results ==
Legend

- F — Won by fall

=== Final ===
Final
Sazhid Sazhidov (RUS)	1	2
Revaz Mindorashvili (GEO)	0	1

=== Top half ===
Round of 32
Taras Danko (UKR)	7	3
Shahab Naeinian (AUS)	0	0
Sergey Kolesnikov (ISR)	1	0
Magomed Kurugliyev (KAZ)	2	1
Árpád Ritter (HUN)	0	0
Serhat Balcı (TUR)	1	1
Stephen Hill (NZL)	1	0
Miroslav Geshev (BUL)	4	3
Man Dula (CHN)	3	1	1
Radosław Horbik (POL)	2	3	3
Sazhid Sazhidov (RUS)	1	3
Travis Cross (CAN)	0	0
Coenraad de Villiers (RSA)	0	0
Reza Yazdani (IRI)	3	6

Round of 16
Samatbek Tolubaev (KGZ)	0	0
Taras Danko (UKR)	1	6
Magomed Kurugliyev (KAZ)	1	0	0
Serhat Balcı (TUR)	0	1	1
Miroslav Geshev (BUL)	1	0
Radosław Horbik (POL)	3	2
Sazhid Sazhidov (RUS)	1	1	1
Reza Yazdani (IRI)	2	0	0

Quarterfinals
Taras Danko (UKR)	1	1
Serhat Balcı (TUR)	0	0
Radosław Horbik (POL)	0	0
Sazhid Sazhidov (RUS)	2	6

Semifinals
Taras Danko (UKR)	0	1
Sazhid Sazhidov (RUS)	1	4

=== Bottom half ===
Round of 32
Noh Je-hyoun (KOR)	5	1	2
Sujeet Maan (IND)	1	3	0
Thomas Bucheli (SUI)	0	1
Zaurbek Sokhiev (UZB)	3	3
Soslan Gattsiev (BLR)	3	1
Shinya Matsumoto (JPN)	3	3
Dejan Bogdanov (MKD)	6^{F}
Keitani Graham (FSM)	0
Davyd Bichinashvili (GER)	0	1	0
Revaz Mindorashvili (GEO)	1	0	1
Rosmel Gil (VEN)	1	4	0
Chagnaadorjiin Ganzorig (MGL)	1	2	1
Vadim Laliev (ARM)	2	5
Andy Hrovat (USA)	2	3
Adrian Jaoude (BRA)	3	3
Marcus Valda (PHI)	0	0

Round of 16
Noh Je-hyoun (KOR)	0	2
Zaurbek Sokhiev (UZB)	2	2
Shinya Matsumoto (JPN)	1	5
Dejan Bogdanov (MKD)	0	4
Revaz Mindorashvili (GEO)	0	3	6
Chagnaadorjiin Ganzorig (MGL)	1	0	1
Vadim Laliev (ARM)	3^{F}
Adrian Jaoude (BRA)	0

Quarterfinals
Zaurbek Sokhiev (UZB)	1	4
Shinya Matsumoto (JPN)	0	0
Revaz Mindorashvili (GEO)	2	2	2
Vadim Laliev (ARM)	2	0	2

Semifinals
Zaurbek Sokhiev (UZB)	1	1
Revaz Mindorashvili (GEO)	1	4

=== Repechage ===
Repechage round 1
Travis Cross (CAN)	0	0
Reza Yazdani (IRI)	3	2
Davyd Bichinashvili (GER)	3^{F}
Chagnaadorjiin Ganzorig (MGL)	0

Repechage round 2
Reza Yazdani (IRI)	2	1
Radosław Horbik (POL)	0	1
Davyd Bichinashvili (GER)	0	0
Vadim Laliev (ARM)	1	2^{F}

Bronze medals
Reza Yazdani (IRI)	2	6^{F}
Taras Danko (UKR)	0	1
Vadim Laliev (ARM)	0	0
Zaurbek Sokhiev (UZB)	1	1
