= 2005 World Wrestling Championships – Men's freestyle 84 kg =

Men's freestyle 84 kg at the 2005 World Championships
- Venue: László Papp Budapest Sports Arena
- Dates: 27 September 2005
- Competitors: 32 from 32 nations

Medalists
gold medal	Revaz Mindorashvili	Georgia
silver medal	Yoel Romero	Cuba
bronze medal	Magomed Kurugliyev	Kazakhstan
bronze medal	Taras Danko	Ukraine

The men's freestyle 84 kilograms is a competition featured at the 2005 World Wrestling Championships, and was held at the László Papp Budapest Sports Arena in Budapest, Hungary on 27 September 2005.

This freestyle wrestling competition consists of a single-elimination tournament, with a repechage used to determine the winner of two bronze medals.

== Results ==
Legend

- F — Won by fall

=== Final ===
Final
Revaz Mindorashvili (GEO)	1	1	5
Yoel Romero (CUB)	0	1	0

=== Top half ===
Round of 32
Anthony Fasugba (ITA)	1	3
Seyed Abbas Zandavi (QAT)	0	1
Revaz Mindorashvili (GEO)	1	2
Travis Cross (CAN)	0	0
Arkadiy Tzopa (BUL)	5	7
Balram Singh (IND)	0	0
Daniel Kennedy (IRL)	0	0
Magomed Kurugliyev (KAZ)	4	4
Muhammed Lawal (USA)	3^{F}
Ibrahim Al-Khatib (LIB)	0
Ruslan Sumenkov (KGZ)	1	3
Nate Ackerman (GBR)	0	0
Fereydoun Ghanbari (IRI)	1	2
Satoru Yamamoto (JPN)	0	0
Sazhid Sazhidov (RUS)	2	4
Davyd Bichinashvili (GER)	1	0

Round of 16
Anthony Fasugba (ITA)	0	0
Revaz Mindorashvili (GEO)	2	3
Arkadiy Tzopa (BUL)	0	1
Magomed Kurugliyev (KAZ)	6	1
Muhammed Lawal (USA)	6	1
Ruslan Sumenkov (KGZ)	0	0
Fereydoun Ghanbari (IRI)	0	1
Sazhid Sazhidov (RUS)	1	1

Quarterfinals
Revaz Mindorashvili (GEO)	2	1	2
Magomed Kurugliyev (KAZ)	4	0	1
Muhammed Lawal (USA)	0	1	1
Sazhid Sazhidov (RUS)	1	0	1

Semifinals
Revaz Mindorashvili (GEO)	1	0	1
Sazhid Sazhidov (RUS)	0	1	0

=== Bottom half ===
Round of 32
Taras Danko (UKR)	2	4
Lee Du-soo (KOR)	0	0
Abdul Ammaev (UZB)	1	0
Serhat Balcı (TUR)	2	3
Adarsh Kewal (SUR)	0
Thomas Bucheli (SUI)	3^{F}
Habetnak Kurghinyan (ARM)	1	2
Liu Haijun (CHN)	2	3
Matt White (PUR)	0	3^{F}
Chagnaadorjiin Ganzorig (MGL)	3	2
Soslan Gattsiev (BLR)	0	4	9
Tamás Kiss (HUN)	1	1	3
Abraham Vassallo (MLT)	0	0
Yoel Romero (CUB)	4	3
Adrian Recorean (ROM)	1	0
Radosław Horbik (POL)	1	2

Round of 16
Taras Danko (UKR)	2	0	3^{F}
Serhat Balcı (TUR)	0	3	0
Thomas Bucheli (SUI)	2	1
Liu Haijun (CHN)	0	0
Matt White (PUR)	0	1
Soslan Gattsiev (BLR)	6	6
Yoel Romero (CUB)	1	2
Radosław Horbik (POL)	0	0

Quarterfinals
Taras Danko (UKR)	1	2
Thomas Bucheli (SUI)	0	0
Soslan Gattsiev (BLR)	0	0
Yoel Romero (CUB)	1	2

Semifinals
Taras Danko (UKR)	1	0
Yoel Romero (CUB)	3	1

=== Repechage ===
Repechage round 1
Travis Cross (CAN)	4	5
Anthony Fasugba (ITA)	1	0
Abraham Vassallo (MLT)	0	0
Radosław Horbik (POL)	6	7

Repechage round 2
Travis Cross (CAN)	0	1
Magomed Kurugliyev (KAZ)	1	5
Radosław Horbik (POL)	2	3
Soslan Gattsiev (BLR)	0	2

Bronze medals
Magomed Kurugliyev (KAZ)	3	1
Sazhid Sazhidov (RUS)	1	0
Radosław Horbik (POL)	0	1
Taras Danko (UKR)	4	2
