= 2009 World Wrestling Championships – Men's freestyle 84 kg =

Men's freestyle 84 kg at the 2009 World Championships
- Venue: Messecenter Herning
- Dates: 22 September 2009
- Competitors: 37 from 37 nations

Medalists
gold medal	Zaurbek Sokhiev	Uzbekistan
silver medal	Jake Herbert	United States
bronze medal	Ibragim Aldatov	Ukraine
bronze medal	Sharif Sharifov	Azerbaijan

The men's freestyle 84 kilograms is a competition featured at the 2009 World Wrestling Championships, and was held at the Messecenter Herning exhibition center in Herning, Denmark on September 22.

== Results ==
Legend

- F — Won by fall
- R — Retired
- WO — Won by walkover

=== Finals ===
Semifinals				Final
Ibragim Aldatov (UKR)	2	0
Zaurbek Sokhiev (UZB)	2	2		Zaurbek Sokhiev (UZB)	1	1
Abdusalam Gadisov (RUS)	4	2	0	Jake Herbert (USA)	0	0
Jake Herbert (USA)	0	2	1

=== Top half ===
==== Section 1 ====
Round of 64

Round of 32
Jamal Mirzaei (IRI)	2	1	2
Reineris Salas (CUB)	1	2	3
Radosław Marcinkiewicz (POL)	0	2
Aznaur Adzhiyev (KAZ)	1	3
Lee Jae-sung (KOR)	0	0
Ibragim Aldatov (UKR)	1	6
Dan Pálinkás (SVK)	0	0
Sergey Kolesnikov (ISR)	6	4

Round of 16
Reineris Salas (CUB)	0	2	5
Aznaur Adzhiyev (KAZ)	1	0	3
Ibragim Aldatov (UKR)	1	4
Sergey Kolesnikov (ISR)	0	0

Quarterfinals
Reineris Salas (CUB)	2	1	0
Ibragim Aldatov (UKR)	0	2	6

==== Section 2 ====
Round of 64

Round of 32
Zaurbek Sokhiev (UZB)	1	1
Adrian Jaoude (BRA)	0	0
Edgaras Voitechovskis (LTU)	1	2
Yusup Abdusalomov (TJK)	3	3
Travis Cross (CAN)	1	4
Chagnaadorjiin Ganzorig (MGL)	1	0
José Daniel Díaz (VEN)	0	2	1
Saïd Itaev (FRA)	3	0	0

Round of 16
Zaurbek Sokhiev (UZB)	1	1
Yusup Abdusalomov (TJK)	0	0
Travis Cross (CAN)	1	0	0
José Daniel Díaz (VEN)	0	1	1

Quarterfinals
Zaurbek Sokhiev (UZB)	1	1
José Daniel Díaz (VEN)	0	0

=== Bottom half ===
==== Section 3 ====
Round of 64

Round of 32
Aibek Usupov (KGZ)	0	1
István Veréb (HUN)	3	1
Ding Hongjun (CHN)	0
Harutyun Yenokyan (ARM)	6^{F}
Adrian Recorean (ROU)	0	1
Armands Zvirbulis (LAT)	1	1
Anthony Fasugba (ITA)	2	0	0
Abdusalam Gadisov (RUS)	2	6	2

Round of 16
István Veréb (HUN)	0	1	2
Harutyun Yenokyan (ARM)	3	0	0
Armands Zvirbulis (LAT)	0	0
Abdusalam Gadisov (RUS)	1	5

Quarterfinals
István Veréb (HUN)	1	0
Abdusalam Gadisov (RUS)	1	1

==== Section 4 ====
Round of 64
Aliaksey Isayeu (BLR)	2	1
Nikoloz Gagnidze (GEO)	1	0
Shinya Matsumoto (JPN)	0	0
Gökhan Yavaşer (TUR)	1	1
Javier Ramos (ESP)	1	1	4
Stephen Hill (NZL)	0	4	2
Gerald Meyer (RSA)	0	0
Theodosios Pavlidis (GRE)	1	4
Miroslav Geshev (BUL)	2	1
Jaime Espinal (PUR)	4	3

Round of 32
Davyd Bichinashvili (GER)	2	5	R
Jake Herbert (USA)	1	8
Sharif Sharifov (AZE)	2	4
Aliaksey Isayeu (BLR)	1	0
Gökhan Yavaşer (TUR)	5^{F}
Javier Ramos (ESP)	0
Theodosios Pavlidis (GRE)	0	0
Jaime Espinal (PUR)	1	1

Round of 16
Jake Herbert (USA)	4	0	3
Sharif Sharifov (AZE)	2	4	1
Gökhan Yavaşer (TUR)	0	6	4
Jaime Espinal (PUR)	2	0	0

Quarterfinals
Jake Herbert (USA)	0	5	1
Gökhan Yavaşer (TUR)	1	3	0

=== Repechage ===
Repechage round 2
Adrian Jaoude (BRA)	3
Yusup Abdusalomov (TJK)	8^{F}
~~Davyd Bichinashvili (GER)~~
Sharif Sharifov (AZE)	W	O

Repechage round 3
Yusup Abdusalomov (TJK)	6	7
José Daniel Díaz (VEN)	0	1
Sharif Sharifov (AZE)	2	3
Gökhan Yavaşer (TUR)	0	0

Bronze medals
Yusup Abdusalomov (TJK)	0	0
Ibragim Aldatov (UKR)	6	3
Sharif Sharifov (AZE)	1	2
Abdusalam Gadisov (RUS)	0	0
