= Georgia at the 2008 Summer Olympics =

- Flag of Georgia
- IOC code: GEO
- NOC: Georgian National Olympic Committee
- Website: www.geonoc.org.ge (in Georgian and English)

in Beijing
- Competitors: 35 in 11 sports
- Flag bearers: Ramaz Nozadze (opening); Revazi Mindorashvili (closing)
- Medals Ranked 26th: Gold 3 Silver 2 Bronze 2 Total 7

Summer Olympics appearances (overview)
- 1996; 2000; 2004; 2008; 2012; 2016; 2020; 2024

Other related appearances
- Russian Empire (1900–1912); Soviet Union (1952–1988); Unified Team (1992)

Georgia competed at the 2008 Summer Olympics in Beijing, People's Republic of China. This is a list of the results of all of the athletes who qualified for the Olympics and were nominated by Georgian National Olympic Committee. Georgia was represented in the 2008 Beijing Olympic Games by 35 sportsmen and sportswomen in total of 11 different sporting events. The Games had a dramatic start for Georgia, as well as for Russia, due to the onset of the 2008 South Ossetia war at the very start of the Games. Georgian athletes won three gold, two silver, and three bronze medals during the games.

== Medalists ==
Medal	Name	Sport	Event
Gold	Manuchar Kvirkvelia	Wrestling	Men's Greco-Roman 74 kg
Gold	Irakli Tsirekidze	Judo	Men's 90 kg
Gold	Revazi Mindorashvili	Wrestling	Men's freestyle 84 kg
Silver	Giorgi Gogshelidze	Wrestling	Men's freestyle 96 kg
Silver	Arsen Kasabiev	Weightlifting	Men's 94 kg
Bronze	Otar Tushishvili	Wrestling	Men's freestyle 66 kg
Bronze	Nino Salukvadze	Shooting	Women's 10 m air pistol

== Archery ==
Georgia sent archers to the Olympics for the fourth time, seeking its first Olympic medal in the sport. Khatuna Narimanidze and Kristine Esebua (both veterans of the 2004 Olympics) earned the nation two spots in the women's competition by placing 5th and 30th in the women's individual competition at the 2007 Outdoor World Target Championships.

Athlete	Event	Ranking round		Round of 64	Round of 32	Round of 16	Quarterfinals	Semifinals	Final / BM	
Athlete	Event	Score	Seed	Opposition Score	Opposition Score	Opposition Score	Opposition Score	Opposition Score	Opposition Score	Rank
Kristina Esebua	Women's individual	643	17	Hayashi (JPN); W 102 (9)–102 (8)	Romantzi (GRE); L 102 (9)–102 (10)	Did not advance				
Khatuna Narimanidze	Women's individual	663	4	Dema (BHU); W 107–97	Brito (VEN); W 111–98	Avitia (MEX); L 108–109	Did not advance			

== Athletics ==
Key

- Note–Ranks given for track events are within the athlete's heat only
- Q = Qualified for the next round
- q = Qualified for the next round as a fastest loser or, in field events, by position without achieving the qualifying target
- NR = National record
- N/A = Round not applicable for the event
- Bye = Athlete not required to compete in round

Men

Athlete	Event	Heat		Quarterfinal		Semifinal		Final	
Athlete	Event	Result	Rank	Result	Rank	Result	Rank	Result	Rank
David Ilariani	110 m hurdles	13.75	6 q	13.74	8	Did not advance			

Women

Athlete	Event	Qualification		Final	
Athlete	Event	Distance	Position	Distance	Position
Mariam Kevkhishvili	Shot put	15.99	30	Did not advance	

== Boxing ==
Georgia qualified two boxers for the Olympic boxing tournament. Both boxers qualified at the second European continental qualifying tournament.

Athlete	Event	Round of 32	Round of 16	Quarterfinals	Semifinals	Final	
Athlete	Event	Opposition Result	Opposition Result	Opposition Result	Opposition Result	Opposition Result	Rank
Nikoloz Izoria	Featherweight	Batshegi (BOT); W 14–4	Imranov (AZE); L 9–18	Did not advance			
Kakhaber Zhvania	Welterweight	Andrade (USA); L 9–11	Did not advance				

== Gymnastics ==
=== Artistic ===
Men

Athlete	Event	Qualification								Final							
Athlete	Event	Apparatus						Total	Rank	Apparatus						Total	Rank
Athlete	Event	F	PH	R	V	PB	HB	Total	Rank	F	PH	R	V	PB	HB	Total	Rank
Ilia Giorgadze	Floor	14.625	—					14.625	46	Did not advance							
Ilia Giorgadze	Parallel bars	—				15.150	—	15.150	41	Did not advance							

=== Trampoline ===
Athlete	Event	Qualification		Final	
Athlete	Event	Score	Rank	Score	Rank
Luba Golovina	Women's	64.90	5 Q	36.10	6

== Judo ==
Men

Athlete	Event	Preliminary	Round of 32	Round of 16	Quarterfinals	Semifinals	Repechage 1	Repechage 2	Repechage 3	Final / BM	
Athlete	Event	Opposition Result	Opposition Result	Opposition Result	Opposition Result	Opposition Result	Opposition Result	Opposition Result	Opposition Result	Opposition Result	Rank
Nestor Khergiani	−60 kg	Bye	Dragin (FRA); L 0010–0101	Did not advance			Yekutiel (ISR); L 0000–0001	Did not advance			
Zaza Kedelashvili	−66 kg	Bye	Ungvári (HUN); L 0000–1000	Did not advance							
David Kevkhishvili	−73 kg	—	Toma (MDA); W 0021–0010	Kim C (PRK); L 0110–0111	Did not advance						
Saba Gavashelishvili	−81 kg	Neto (POR); L 0000–1010	Did not advance								
Irakli Tsirekidze	−90 kg	—	Bye	Mesbah (EGY); W 0010–0001	Mammadov (AZE); W 1000–0000	Pershin (RUS); W 1002–0000	Bye			Benikhlef (ALG); W 0001–0000	1st place, gold medalist(s)
Levan Zhorzholiani	−100 kg	—	Cousins (GBR); W 0010–0000	Miraliyev (AZE); L 0000–1010	Did not advance		Azzoun (ALG); W 1001–0001	Brata (ROU); W 1001–0000	Jang S (KOR); W 0021–0020	Grol (NED); L 0000–0020	5
Lasha Gujejiani	+100 kg	Bye	Blas Jr. (GUM); W 0200–0001	McCormick (USA); W 1000–0000	Roudaki (IRI); W 0011–0000	Ishii (JPN); L 0000–1011	Bye			Riner (FRA); L 0000–1011	5

== Shooting ==
On 10 August 2008, Nino Salukvadze made international headlines as she kissed and hugged with Russian silver medalist Natalia Paderina after the 10m air pistol medal ceremony while Georgia and Russia were fighting over South Ossetia.

Women

Athlete	Event	Qualification		Final	
Athlete	Event	Points	Rank	Points	Rank
Nino Salukvadze	10 m air pistol	386	4	487.4	3rd place, bronze medalist(s)
Nino Salukvadze	25 m pistol	580	16	Did not advance	

== Swimming ==
Men

Athlete	Event	Heat		Semifinal		Final	
Athlete	Event	Time	Rank	Time	Rank	Time	Rank
Irakli Revishvili	200 m freestyle	1:53.60	53	Did not advance			

Women

Athlete	Event	Heat		Semifinal		Final	
Athlete	Event	Time	Rank	Time	Rank	Time	Rank
Anna Salnikova	100 m breaststroke	1:21.70	48	Did not advance			

== Volleyball ==
=== Beach ===
Both Georgian teams were composed of Brazilians who became Georgian citizens to compete in Olympic beach volleyball. The players' nicknames echoed the name of the country, the men in English ("Geor and "Gia"), and the women in Georgian ("Saka" and "Rtvelo"). Beach volleyball proved to be the most notable moment for the Georgian team when their women defeated Russian opponents. The added notability to this game stemmed from the military conflict with Russia over South Ossetia.

The men were ranked seventeenth, and were playing in Pool C against pairs from Brazil, Australia and Angola. The women are ranked 23rd in the Olympic qualifying rankings, and were the last team to earn entry from the rankings list. They were playing in Pool C against pairs from Brazil, Australia and Russia.

Athlete	Event	Preliminary round	Standing	Round of 16	Quarterfinals	Semifinals	Final / BM	
Athlete	Event	Opposition Score	Standing	Opposition Score	Opposition Score	Opposition Score	Opposition Score	Rank
Renato "Geor" Gomes; Jorge "Gia" Terceiro	Men's	Pool C Schacht – Slack (AUS); L 0 – 2 (17–21, 19–21); Ricardo – Emanuel (BRA); L 0 – 2 (19–21, 17–21); Fernandes - Morais (ANG); W 2 – 0 (21–14, 21–13)	3 Q	Doppler – Gartmayer (AUT); W 2 – 1 (19–21, 21–16, 15–13)	Nummerdor - Schuil (NED); W 2 – 0 (21–19, 21–19)	Dalhausser – Rogers (USA); L 0 – 2 (11–21, 13–21)	Ricardo - Emanuel (BRA); L 0 – 2 (15–21, 10–21)	4
Andrezza "Rtvelo" Martins; Cristine "Saka" Santanna	Women's	Pool C Ana Paula – Larissa (BRA); L 1 – 2 (25–23, 17–21, 5–15); Barnett - Cook (AUS); L 0 – 2 (18–21, 12–21); Shiryaeva – Uryadova (RUS); W 2 – 1 (10–21, 22–20, 15–12); Lucky Losers; Mouha – van Breedam (BEL); L 0 – 2 (13–21, 19–21)	3	Did not advance				

== Weightlifting ==
Athlete	Event	Snatch		Clean & Jerk		Total	Rank
Athlete	Event	Result	Rank	Result	Rank	Total	Rank
Raul Tsirek'idze	Men's −85 kg	143	17	—	—	143	DNF
Arsen Kasabiev	Men's −94 kg	176	4	223	2	399	2nd place, silver medalist(s)
Albert Kuzilov	Men's −105 kg	182	7	227	4	409	6

- Arsen Kasabiev originally finished fourth, but in January 2017, he was promoted to second place due to two disqualifications.

== Wrestling ==
Key:

- VT - Victory by Fall.
- PP - Decision by Points - the loser with technical points.
- PO - Decision by Points - the loser without technical points.

Men's freestyle

Athlete	Event	Qualification	Round of 16	Quarterfinal	Semifinal	Repechage 1	Repechage 2	Final / BM	
Athlete	Event	Opposition Result	Opposition Result	Opposition Result	Opposition Result	Opposition Result	Opposition Result	Opposition Result	Rank
Besarion Gochashvili	−55 kg	Bye	Toarcă (ROU); W 3–0 ^{PO}	Cejudo (USA); L 1–3 ^{PP}	Did not advance	Bye	Velikov (BUL); L 1–3 ^{PP}	Did not advance	8
Otar Tushishvili	−66 kg	Bye	Ikematsu (JPN); W 3–1 ^{PP}	Barzakov (BUL); W 3–0 ^{PO}	Şahin (TUR); L 1–3 ^{PP}	Bye		Garzón (CUB); W 3–1 ^{PP}	3rd place, bronze medalist(s)
Gela Saghirashvili	−74 kg	Midana (GBS); W 3–1 ^{PP}	Haidarau (BLR); L 0–3 ^{PO}	Did not advance					12
Revazi Mindorashvili	−84 kg	Bye	Bichinashvili (GER); W 3–1 ^{PP}	Yenokyan (ARM); W 3–0 ^{PO}	Ketoev (RUS); W 3–1 ^{PP}	Bye		Abdusalomov (TJK); W 3–1 ^{PP}	1st place, gold medalist(s)
Giorgi Gogshelidze	−96 kg	Bye	Krupnyakov (KGZ); W 3–0 ^{PO}	Ebrahimi (IRI); W 3–0 ^{PO}	Tigiyev (KAZ); L 1–3 ^{PP}	Bye		Batista (CUB); W 3–0 ^{PO}	2nd place, silver medalist(s)

- Giorgi Gogshelidze originally finished third, but in November 2016, he was promoted to second place due to disqualification of Taimuraz Tigiyev.

Men's Greco-Roman

Athlete	Event	Qualification	Round of 16	Quarterfinal	Semifinal	Repechage 1	Repechage 2	Final / BM	
Athlete	Event	Opposition Result	Opposition Result	Opposition Result	Opposition Result	Opposition Result	Opposition Result	Opposition Result	Rank
Lasha Gogitadze	−55 kg	Bye	Jiao Hf (CHN); W 3–0 ^{PO}	Amoyan (ARM); L 1–3 ^{PP}	Did not advance				9
David Bedinadze	−60 kg	Nazaryan (BUL); L 1–3 ^{PP}	Did not advance						16
Manuchar Kvirkvelia	−74 kg	Bye	Guénot (FRA); W 3–0 ^{PO}	Schneider (GER); W 3–0 ^{PO}	Bácsi (HUN); W 3–1 ^{PP}	Bye		Chang Yx (CHN); W 3–0 ^{PO}	1st place, gold medalist(s)
Badri Khasaia	−84 kg	Bye	Avluca (TUR); L 1–3 ^{PP}	Did not advance					16
Ramaz Nozadze	−96 kg	Bye	Tounousidis (GRE); W 3–1 ^{PP}	Švec (CZE); L 1–3 ^{PP}	Did not advance				12
