= Tajikistan at the 2008 Summer Olympics =

- IOC code: TJK
- NOC: National Olympic Committee of the Republic of Tajikistan
- Website: www.olympic.tj (in Tajik)

in Beijing
- Competitors: 13 in 5 sports
- Flag bearers: Dilshod Nazarov (opening); Yusup Abdusalomov (closing)
- Medals Ranked 64th: Gold 0 Silver 1 Bronze 1 Total 2

Summer Olympics appearances (overview)
- 1996; 2000; 2004; 2008; 2012; 2016; 2020; 2024

Other related appearances
- Russian Empire (1900–1912); Soviet Union (1952–1988); Unified Team (1992)

Tajikistan competed at the 2008 Summer Olympics which was held in Beijing, People's Republic of China from August 8 to August 24, 2008. The country has sent thirteen competitors to the Games, who took part in five sports: boxing, judo, swimming, hammer throw and freestyle wrestling.

On August 11, 2008, Rasul Boqiev won Tajikistan's first Olympic medal, a bronze in men's judo. This was Tajikistan's first Olympic medal ever.

== Medalists ==
Medal	Name	Sport	Event
Silver	Yusup Abdusalomov	Wrestling	Men's freestyle 84 kg
Bronze	Rasul Boqiev	Judo	Men's 73 kg

== Archery ==
Athlete	Event	Ranking round		Round of 64	Round of 32	Round of 16	Quarterfinals	Semifinals	Final / BM	
Athlete	Event	Score	Seed	Opposition Score	Opposition Score	Opposition Score	Opposition Score	Opposition Score	Opposition Score	Rank
Albina Kamaletdinova	Women's individual	547	63	Yun O-H (KOR) (2); L 102–109	Did not advance					

== Athletics ==
Key

- Note – Ranks given for track events are within the athlete's heat only
- Q = Qualified for the next round
- q = Qualified for the next round as a fastest loser or, in field events, by position without achieving the qualifying target
- NR = National record
- N/A = Round not applicable for the event
- Bye = Athlete not required to compete in round

Men

Athlete	Event	Qualification		Final	
Athlete	Event	Distance	Position	Distance	Position
Dilshod Nazarov	Hammer throw	75.35	12 q	76.54	11

Women

Athlete	Event	Qualification		Final	
Athlete	Event	Distance	Position	Distance	Position
Galina Mityaeva	Hammer throw	51.38	47	Did not advance	

== Boxing ==
Athlete	Event	Round of 32	Round of 16	Quarterfinals	Semifinals	Final	
Athlete	Event	Opposition Result	Opposition Result	Opposition Result	Opposition Result	Opposition Result	Rank
Sherali Dostiev	Light flyweight	Hernández (CUB); L 1–12	Did not advance				
Anvar Yunusov	Flyweight	Chauke (RSA); W 9–1	Vieira (BRA); W 12–6	Jongjohor (THA); L 1–8	Did not advance		
Djakhon Kurbanov	Light heavyweight	Atoev (UZB); W 11–3	Šivolija (CRO); W 8–1	Shynaliyev (KAZ); L DSQ	Did not advance		

== Judo ==
Men

Athlete	Event	Preliminary	Round of 32	Round of 16	Quarterfinals	Semifinals	Repechage 1	Repechage 2	Repechage 3	Final / BM	
Athlete	Event	Opposition Result	Opposition Result	Opposition Result	Opposition Result	Opposition Result	Opposition Result	Opposition Result	Opposition Result	Opposition Result	Rank
Rasul Boqiev	−73 kg	—	Kibanza (COD); W 0210–0000	Bilodid (UKR); W 1000–0000	Si Rg (CHN); W 1110–0001	Wang K-C (KOR); L 0001–0010	Bye			van Tichelt (BEL); W 0011–0000	3rd place, bronze medalist(s)
Sherali Bozorov	−81 kg	Denanyoh (TOG); L 0010–0011	Did not advance								
Nematullo Asranqulov	−90 kg	—	Mammadov (AZE); L 0000–0011	Did not advance							

== Shooting ==
Men

Athlete	Event	Qualification		Final	
Athlete	Event	Points	Rank	Points	Rank
Sergey Babikov	10 m air pistol	574	31	Did not advance	

== Swimming ==
Men

Athlete	Event	Heat		Semifinal		Final	
Athlete	Event	Time	Rank	Time	Rank	Time	Rank
Alisher Chingizov	50 m freestyle	29.10	86	Did not advance			

Women

Athlete	Event	Heat		Semifinal		Final	
Athlete	Event	Time	Rank	Time	Rank	Time	Rank
Katerina Izmaylova	50 m freestyle	32.09	80	Did not advance			

== Weightlifting ==
Athlete	Event	Snatch		Clean & Jerk		Total	Rank
Athlete	Event	Result	Rank	Result	Rank	Total	Rank
Nizom Sangov	Men's −69 kg	115	27	135	24	250	24

== Wrestling ==
Key

- VT - Victory by Fall.
- PP - Decision by Points - the loser with technical points.
- PO - Decision by Points - the loser without technical points.

Men's freestyle

Athlete	Event	Qualification	Round of 16	Quarterfinal	Semifinal	Repechage 1	Repechage 2	Final / BM	
Athlete	Event	Opposition Result	Opposition Result	Opposition Result	Opposition Result	Opposition Result	Opposition Result	Opposition Result	Rank
Vitalij Korjakin	−60 kg	Bye	Yumoto (JPN); L 0–5 ^{VT}	Did not advance					15
Yusup Abdusalomov	−84 kg	Bye	Kumar (AUS); W 3–0 ^{PO}	Danko (UKR); W 3–0 ^{PO}	Balcı (TUR); W 3–0 ^{PO}	Bye		Mindorashvili (GEO); L 1–3 ^{PP}	2nd place, silver medalist(s)
