= Wrestling at the 2008 Summer Olympics – Men's freestyle 84 kg =

Men's freestyle 84 kg at the Games of the XXIX Olympiad
- Venue: China Agricultural University Gymnasium
- Date: 21 August 2008
- Competitors: 20 from 20 nations

Medalists
1st place, gold medalist(s)		Revaz Mindorashvili	Georgia
2nd place, silver medalist(s)		Yusup Abdusalomov	Tajikistan
3rd place, bronze medalist(s)		Taras Danko	Ukraine
3rd place, bronze medalist(s)		Georgy Ketoev	Russia

Men's freestyle 84 kilograms competition at the 2008 Summer Olympics in Beijing, China, took place on 21 August at the China Agricultural University Gymnasium.

This freestyle wrestling competition consists of a single-elimination tournament, with a repechage used to determine the winner of two bronze medals. The two finalists face off for gold and silver medals. Each wrestler who loses to one of the two finalists moves into the repechage, culminating in a pair of bronze medal matches featuring the semifinal losers each facing the remaining repechage opponent from their half of the bracket.

Each bout consists of up to three rounds, lasting two minutes apiece. The wrestler who scores more points in each round is the winner of that rounds; the bout ends when one wrestler has won two rounds (and thus the match).

== Schedule ==
All times are China Standard Time (UTC+08:00)

Date	Time	Event
21 August 2008	09:30	Qualification rounds
21 August 2008	16:00	Repechage
21 August 2008	17:00	Finals

== Results ==
Legend

- F — Won by fall

=== Final ===
Final
Yusup Abdusalomov (TJK)	3	0	0
Revaz Mindorashvili (GEO)	2	3	4

=== Top half ===
Qualifications

1/8 finals
Andy Hrovat (USA)	3	1	2
Reineris Salas (CUB)	0	3	2
Travis Cross (CAN)	1	1
Serhat Balcı (TUR)	1	1
Jarlis Mosquera (COL)	0	0
Taras Danko (UKR)	3	3
Sandeep Kumar (AUS)	0	0
Yusup Abdusalomov (TJK)	3	5

Quarterfinals
Reineris Salas (CUB)	0	0
Serhat Balcı (TUR)	1	2
Taras Danko (UKR)	0	0
Yusup Abdusalomov (TJK)	1	6

Semifinals
Serhat Balcı (TUR)	0	0
Yusup Abdusalomov (TJK)	3	1

=== Bottom half ===
Qualifications
Reza Yazdani (IRI)	1	3
Radosław Horbik (POL)	0	1
Chagnaadorjiin Ganzorig (MGL)	0	1	0
Novruz Temrezov (AZE)	3	0	3
Wang Ying (CHN)	2	1
Georgy Ketoev (RUS)	2	3
Gennadiy Laliyev (KAZ)	4	0
Zaurbek Sokhiev (UZB)	5	1

1/8 finals
Adnan Rhimi (TUN)	0	1
Harutyun Yenokyan (ARM)	6	8
Revaz Mindorashvili (GEO)	1	2	3
Davyd Bichinashvili (GER)	4	0	1
Reza Yazdani (IRI)	0
Novruz Temrezov (AZE)	6^{F}
Georgy Ketoev (RUS)	4	5
Zaurbek Sokhiev (UZB)	1	1

Quarterfinals
Harutyun Yenokyan (ARM)	0	0
Revaz Mindorashvili (GEO)	2	2
Novruz Temrezov (AZE)	4	0	0
Georgy Ketoev (RUS)	0	2	2

Semifinals
Revaz Mindorashvili (GEO)	4	7^{F}
Georgy Ketoev (RUS)	2	3

=== Repechage ===
Repechage round 2
Sandeep Kumar (AUS)	0	0
Taras Danko (UKR)	3	6
Davyd Bichinashvili (GER)	1	1	2
Harutyun Yenokyan (ARM)	0	3	0

Bronze medals
Taras Danko (UKR)	1	2
Serhat Balcı (TUR)	0	0
Davyd Bichinashvili (GER)	0	2	2
Georgy Ketoev (RUS)	3	0	2

== Final standing ==
Rank	Athlete
1st place, gold medalist(s)	Revaz Mindorashvili (GEO)
2nd place, silver medalist(s)	Yusup Abdusalomov (TJK)
3rd place, bronze medalist(s)	Taras Danko (UKR)
3rd place, bronze medalist(s)	Georgy Ketoev (RUS)
5	Serhat Balcı (TUR)
5	Davyd Bichinashvili (GER)
7	Novruz Temrezov (AZE)
8	Harutyun Yenokyan (ARM)
9	Zaurbek Sokhiev (UZB)
10	Reineris Salas (CUB)
11	Reza Yazdani (IRI)
12	Andy Hrovat (USA)
13	Gennadiy Laliyev (KAZ)
14	Wang Ying (CHN)
15	Travis Cross (CAN)
16	Radosław Horbik (POL)
17	Chagnaadorjiin Ganzorig (MGL)
18	Adnan Rhimi (TUN)
19	Jarlis Mosquera (COL)
20	Sandeep Kumar (AUS)
