= Tajikistan national freestyle wrestling athletes =

Tajikistan national amateur freestyle wrestling athletes represents Tajikistan in regional, continental, and world tournaments and matches sanctioned by the United World Wrestling (UWW).

== Olympics ==
| Year | Venue | Medalists | | |
| Year | Venue | Gold | Silver | Bronze |
|---|---|---|---|---|
| 1996 | Atlanta | - | - | - |
| 2000 | Sydney | No Tajikistani wrestlers competed | | |
| 2004 | Athens | - | - | - |
| 2008 | Beijing | — | Yusup Abdusalomov | - |
| 2012 | London | - | - | - |
| 2016 | Rio de Janeiro | No Tajikistani wrestlers competed | | |

== World Championship ==
| Year | Venue | Medalists | | | Team rank |
| Year | Venue | Gold | Silver | Bronze | Team rank |
|---|---|---|---|---|---|
| 1994 | Istanbul | - | - | - | - |
| 1995 | Atlanta | - | - | - | - |
| 1997 | Krasnoyarsk | - | - | - | - |
| 1998 | Tehran | - | - | - | - |
| 1999 | Ankara | - | - | - | - |
| 2001 | Sofia | - | - | - | - |
| 2002 | Tehran | - | - | - | - |
| 2003 | New York City | - | - | - | - |
| 2005 | Budapest | - | - | - | - |
| 2006 | Guangzhou | - | - | - | - |
| 2007 | Baku | — | Yusup Abdusalomov | - | 18th |
| 2009 | Herning | - | - | - | - |
| 2010 | Moscow | - | - | - | - |
| 2011 | Istanbul | - | - | - | - |
| 2013 | Budapest | - | - | - | - |
| 2014 | Tashkent | - | - | - | - |
| 2015 | Las Vegas | - | - | - | - |

== Asian Games ==
| Year | Venue | Medalists | | |
| Year | Venue | Gold | Silver | Bronze |
|---|---|---|---|---|
| 1994 | Hiroshima | No Tajikistani wrestlers competed | | |
| 1998 | Bangkok | No Tajikistani wrestlers competed | | |
| 2002 | Busan | - | Yusup Abdusalomov; Lidiya Karamchakova | Shamil Aliev |
| 2006 | Doha | - | - | — |
| 2010 | Guangzhou | - | - | — |
| 2014 | Incheon | - | Zalimkhan Yusupov | — |

== Asian Championships ==
| Year | Venue | Medalists | | | Team rank |
| Year | Venue | Gold | Silver | Bronze | Team rank |
|---|---|---|---|---|---|
| 1995 | Manila | - | - | - | - |
| 1996 | Xiaoshan | - | - | - | - |
| 1997 | Tehran | - | - | - | - |
| 1999 | Tashkent | - | - | - | 10th |
| 2000 | Guilin | - | - | - | - |
| 2001 | Ulaanbaatar | - | - | - | - |
| 2003 | New Delhi | Yusup Abdusalomov | Shamil Aliev | — | 8th |
| 2004 | Tehran | - | - | - | - |
| 2005 | Wuhan | - | - | - | - |
| 2006 | Almaty | - | - | - | - |
| 2007 | Bishkek | - | - | - | - |
| 2008 | Jeju City | - | - | Yusup Abdusalomov | 12th |
| 2009 | Pattaya | - | - | - | - |
| 2010 | New Delhi | - | - | - | - |
| 2011 | Tashkent | - | - | - | - |
| 2012 | Gumi | - | - | Yusup Abdusalomov | 9th |
| 2013 | New Delhi | - | Rustam Iskandari | Safarali Komildzoni | 7th |
| 2014 | Astana | - | Somirsho Vokhidov | Rustam Iskandari | 7th |
| 2015 | Doha | - | - | Farkhod Anakulov | 8th |
| 2016 | Bangkok | - | - | Azamat Sufiev | 10th |
