= Colombia at the 2008 Summer Olympics =

- IOC code: COL
- NOC: Colombian Olympic Committee
- Website: www.olimpicocol.co (in Spanish)

in Beijing
- Competitors: 67 in 15 sports
- Flag bearers: María Luisa Calle (opening); Juan Urán (closing)
- Medals Ranked 60th: Gold 0 Silver 2 Bronze 1 Total 3

Summer Olympics appearances (overview)
- 1932; 1936; 1948; 1952; 1956; 1960; 1964; 1968; 1972; 1976; 1980; 1984; 1988; 1992; 1996; 2000; 2004; 2008; 2012; 2016; 2020; 2024

Colombia competed at the 2008 Summer Olympics. The country sent 68 athletes to compete in 15 sports (archery, athletics, boxing, rowing, cycling, equestrian, artistic gymnastics, judo, weightlifting, wrestling, swimming, taekwondo, and table tennis), making this Colombia's largest ever delegation to the Olympics.

Originally, Colombia left Beijing with two medals, a silver and a bronze won by weightlifter Diego Salazar and wrestler Jackeline Rentería respectively. Weightlifter Leydi Solís originally finished fourth, but was promoted to a silver medal after both gold and bronze medalist of the 69 kg category were disqualified following a positive anti-doping test of their respective 2008 samples. She received her medal in december 2017.

== Medalists ==
Medal	Name	Sport	Event	Date
Silver	Diego Salazar	Weightlifting	Men's 62 kg	August 11
Silver	Leydi Solís	Weightlifting	Women's 69 kg	August 13
Bronze	Jackeline Rentería	Wrestling	Women's freestyle 55 kg	August 16

Medals by sport
Sport	1st place, gold medalist(s)	2nd place, silver medalist(s)	3rd place, bronze medalist(s)	Total
Weightlifting	0	2	0	2
Wrestling	0	0	1	1
Total	0	2	1	3

Medals by gender
Gender	1st place, gold medalist(s)	2nd place, silver medalist(s)	3rd place, bronze medalist(s)	Total	Percentage
Female	0	1	1	2	66,7%
Male	0	1	0	1	33,3%
Mixed	0	0	0	0	0%
Total	0	2	1	3	100%

== Archery ==
Colombia sent archers to the Olympics for the third time and first since 1992; the nation sought its first Olympic medal in the sport. Colombia qualified a full team of three women by placing ninth in the women's team event at the 2007 World Archery Championships (because host China took seventh, nine teams were taken instead of the usual eight). The team that Colombia sent to the Olympics was the same that competed at the Worlds: Sigrid Romero, Ana Rendón, and Natalia Sánchez.

Athlete	Event	Ranking round		Round of 64	Round of 32	Round of 16	Quarterfinals	Semifinals	Final / BM	
Athlete	Event	Score	Seed	Opposition Score	Opposition Score	Opposition Score	Opposition Score	Opposition Score	Opposition Score	Rank
Ana Rendón	Women's individual	647	10	Tonetta (ITA); W 106 (10)–106 (9)	Dagbaeva (RUS); W 110–106	Lorig (USA); L 95–107	Did not advance			
Sigrid Romero	Women's individual	551	62	Joo H-J (KOR); L 98–108	Did not advance					
Natalia Sánchez	Women's individual	643	18	Muliuk (BLR); L 101–104	Did not advance					
Ana Rendón; Sigrid Romero; Natalia Sánchez	Women's team	1841	10	—N/a		Japan (7); L 206–199	Did not advance			

== Athletics ==
Key

- Note–Ranks given for track events are within the athlete's heat only
- Q = Qualified for the next round
- q = Qualified for the next round as a fastest loser or, in field events, by position without achieving the qualifying target
- NR = National record
- N/A = Round not applicable for the event
- Bye = Athlete not required to compete in round

Men
Track & road events

Athlete	Event	Heat		Quarterfinal		Semifinal		Final	
Athlete	Event	Result	Rank	Result	Rank	Result	Rank	Result	Rank
Juan Carlos Cardona	Marathon	—N/a						2:21:57	43
Daniel Grueso	100 m	10.35	4 q	10.37	8	Did not advance			
Daniel Grueso	200 m	21.15	7	Did not advance					
Luis Fernando López	20 km walk	—N/a						1:20:59	9
Rodrigo Moreno	50 km walk	—N/a						4:03:52	34
Geiner Mosquera	400 m	46.59	7	—N/a		Did not advance			
James Rendón	20 km walk	—N/a						1:24:41	31
Paulo César Villar	110 m hurdles	13.37	1 Q	13.46	3 Q	13.85	8	Did not advance	

Women
Track & road events

Athlete	Event	Heat		Quarterfinal		Semifinal		Final	
Athlete	Event	Result	Rank	Result	Rank	Result	Rank	Result	Rank
Rosibel García	800 m	2:01.98	2 Q	—N/a		1:59.38 NR	5	Did not advance	
Yomara Hinestroza	100 m	11.39	4 q	11.66	7	Did not advance			
Darlenys Obregón	200 m	23.33	5 q	23.40	7	Did not advance			
Bertha Sánchez	Marathon	—N/a						2:47:02	62
Sandra Zapata	20 km walk	—N/a						1:36:18	35

Field events

Athlete	Event	Qualification		Final	
Athlete	Event	Distance	Position	Distance	Position
Zuleima Aramendiz	Javelin throw	54.71	39	Did not advance	
Johana Moreno	Hammer throw	64.66	36	Did not advance	

== Boxing ==
Colombia qualified five boxers for the Olympic boxing tournament. Romero and Pérez qualified at the world championships. Álvarez, Julio Blanco, and Rivas qualified at the second American continental qualifying tournament.

Athlete	Event	Round of 32	Round of 16	Quarterfinals	Semifinals	Final	
Athlete	Event	Opposition Result	Opposition Result	Opposition Result	Opposition Result	Opposition Result	Rank
Jonatan Romero	Bantamweight	Mesbahi (MAR); L 3–11	Did not advance				
Darley Pérez	Lightweight	Bye	Talasbayev (KGZ); W 15–4	Tishchenko (RUS); L 5–13	Did not advance		
Eleider Álvarez	Light heavyweight	Bye	Jeffries (GBR); L 5–5^{+}	Did not advance			
Deivi Julio Blanco	Heavyweight	—N/a	M'Bumba (FRA); L 5–11	Did not advance			
Óscar Rivas	Super heavyweight	—N/a	Pulev (BUL); W 11–5	Cammarelle (ITA); L 5–9	Did not advance		

== Cycling ==
=== Road ===
Athlete	Event	Time	Rank
Santiago Botero	Men's road race	6:24:01	7
Santiago Botero	Men's time trial	1:06:35	25
José Serpa	Men's road race	6:26:27	41
Rigoberto Urán	Men's road race	Did not finish	

=== Track ===
Pursuit

Athlete	Event	Qualification		Semifinals		Finals	
Athlete	Event	Time	Rank	Opponent Results	Rank	Opponent Results	Rank
Carlos Alzate	Men's individual pursuit	4:35.154	16	Did not advance			
María Luisa Calle	Women's individual pursuit	3:41.175	10	Did not advance			
Juan Esteban Arango; Arles Castro; Juan Pablo Forero; Jairo Pérez	Men's team pursuit	4:11.397	10	Did not advance			

Omnium

Athlete	Event	Points	Laps	Rank
María Luisa Calle	Women's points race	13	0	4

=== Mountain biking ===
Athlete	Event	Time	Rank
Héctor Páez	Men's cross-country	2:06:46	26

=== BMX ===
Athlete	Event	Seeding		Quarterfinals		Semifinals		Final	
Athlete	Event	Result	Rank	Points	Rank	Points	Rank	Result	Rank
Augusto Castro	Men's BMX	36.301	7	14	5	Did not advance			
Andrés Jiménez	Men's BMX	36.339	9	11	4 Q	13	4 Q	39.137	4
Sergio Salazar	Men's BMX	36.145	6	15	5	Did not advance			

== Diving ==
Men

Athlete	Events	Preliminaries		Semifinals		Final	
Athlete	Events	Points	Rank	Points	Rank	Points	Rank
Juan Urán	3 m springboard	443.05	14 Q	468.90	9 Q	454.60	10
Juan Urán	10 m platform	418.00	18 Q	436.10	12 Q	414.80	11
Víctor Ortega; Juan Urán	10 m synchronized platform	—N/a				423.66	6

Women

Athlete	Events	Preliminaries		Semifinals		Final	
Athlete	Events	Points	Rank	Points	Rank	Points	Rank
Diana Pineda	3 m springboard	268.85	20	Did not advance			

== Equestrian ==
=== Show jumping ===
Athlete	Horse	Event	Qualification								Final					Total	
Athlete	Horse	Event	Round 1		Round 2			Round 3			Round A		Round B			Total	
Athlete	Horse	Event	Penalties	Rank	Penalties	Total	Rank	Penalties	Total	Rank	Penalties	Rank	Penalties	Total	Rank	Penalties	Rank
Manuel Torres	Chambacunero	Individual	21	72 Q	22	43	63	Did not advance								43	63

== Gymnastics ==
=== Artistic ===
Men

Athlete	Event	Qualification								Final							
Athlete	Event	Apparatus						Total	Rank	Apparatus						Total	Rank
Athlete	Event	F	PH	R	V	PB	HB	Total	Rank	F	PH	R	V	PB	HB	Total	Rank
Jorge Hugo Giraldo	All-around	14.200	13.350	13.950	15.150	14.025	13.975	84.650	42	Did not advance							

Women

Athlete	Event	Qualification						Final					
Athlete	Event	Apparatus				Total	Rank	Apparatus				Total	Rank
Athlete	Event	F	V	UB	BB	Total	Rank	F	V	UB	BB	Total	Rank
Natalia Sánchez	All-around	13.000	14.150	13.175	13.825	54.150	53	Did not advance					

== Judo ==
Athlete	Event	Preliminary	Round of 32	Round of 16	Quarterfinals	Semifinals	Repechage 1	Repechage 2	Repechage 3	Final / BM	
Athlete	Event	Opposition Result	Opposition Result	Opposition Result	Opposition Result	Opposition Result	Opposition Result	Opposition Result	Opposition Result	Opposition Result	Rank
Mario Valles	Men's −81 kg	Bye	Anthony (AUS); W 1010–0000	Gontiuk (UKR); L 0001–0110	Did not advance		Denanyoh (TOG); W 0100–0001	Burton (GBR); L 0001–0110	Did not advance		
Yuri Alvear	Women's −70 kg	—N/a	Zhanzunova (KAZ); W 1000–0000	Hernández (CUB); L 0100–1000	Did not advance		Bye	Scapin (ITA); W 1000–0010	Iglesias (ESP); L 0000–0001	Did not advance	

== Rowing ==
Men

Athlete	Event	Heats		Quarterfinals		Semifinals		Final	
Athlete	Event	Time	Rank	Time	Rank	Time	Rank	Time	Rank
Rodrigo Ideus	Single sculls	7:56.85	5 SE/F	Bye		7:29.71	2 FE	7:18.61	27

Qualification Legend: FA=Final A (medal); FB=Final B (non-medal); FC=Final C (non-medal); FD=Final D (non-medal); FE=Final E (non-medal); FF=Final F (non-medal); SA/B=Semifinals A/B; SC/D=Semifinals C/D; SE/F=Semifinals E/F; QF=Quarterfinals; R=Repechage

== Sailing ==
Men

Athlete	Event	Race											Net points	Final rank
Athlete	Event	1	2	3	4	5	6	7	8	9	10	M*	Net points	Final rank
Santiago Grillo	RS:X	30	35	29	31	33	35	35	~~DNF~~	31	34	EL	293	35

M = Medal race; EL = Eliminated – did not advance into the medal race; CAN = Race cancelled

== Shooting ==
Men

Athlete	Event	Qualification		Final	
Athlete	Event	Points	Rank	Points	Rank
Diego Duarte	Skeet	106	38	Did not advance	

== Swimming ==
Men

Athlete	Event	Heat		Semifinal		Final	
Athlete	Event	Time	Rank	Time	Rank	Time	Rank
Camilo Becerra	50 m freestyle	22.93	49	Did not advance			
Camilo Becerra	100 m butterfly	54.27	53	Did not advance			
Julio Galofre	200 m freestyle	1:50.62	43	Did not advance			
Omar Pinzón	100 m backstroke	55.11	26	Did not advance			
Omar Pinzón	200 m backstroke	1:59.11	18	Did not advance			
Omar Pinzón	200 m butterfly	1:59.47	30	Did not advance			
Omar Pinzón	200 m individual medley	2:02.28	30	Did not advance			
Omar Pinzón	400 m individual medley	4:22.31	21	—N/a		Did not advance	

Women

Athlete	Event	Heat		Semifinal		Final	
Athlete	Event	Time	Rank	Time	Rank	Time	Rank
Carolina Colorado Henao	50 m freestyle	26.11	38	Did not advance			
Carolina Colorado Henao	100 m backstroke	1:01.19	19	Did not advance			
Carolina Colorado Henao	100 m butterfly	1:00.06	38	Did not advance			
Erika Stewart	200 m individual medley	2:18.54	32	Did not advance			

== Table tennis ==
Athlete	Event	Preliminary round	Round 1	Round 2	Round 3	Round 4	Quarterfinals	Semifinals	Final / BM	
Athlete	Event	Opposition Result	Opposition Result	Opposition Result	Opposition Result	Opposition Result	Opposition Result	Opposition Result	Opposition Result	Rank
Paula Medina	Women's singles	Zhang M (CAN); L 0–4	Did not advance							

== Taekwondo ==
Athlete	Event	Round of 16	Quarterfinals	Semifinals	Repechage	Bronze Medal	Final	
Athlete	Event	Opposition Result	Opposition Result	Opposition Result	Opposition Result	Opposition Result	Opposition Result	Rank
Gladys Mora	Women's −49 kg	Yang S-C (TPE); L (−1)–0	Did not advance					
Doris Patiño	Women's −57 kg	Calabrese (ITA); L 0–2	Did not advance					

== Weightlifting ==
Men

Athlete	Event	Snatch		Clean & Jerk		Total	Rank
Athlete	Event	Result	Rank	Result	Rank	Total	Rank
Sergio Rada	−56 kg	112	14	140	12	252	12
Diego Salazar	−62 kg	138	2	167	2	305	2nd place, silver medalist(s)
Óscar Figueroa	−62 kg	~~128~~	DNF	—	—	—	DNF
Edwin Mosquera	−69 kg	~~134~~	DNF	—	—	—	DNF
Luis Miguel Pineda	−69 kg	132	19	167	15	299	15
Carlos Andica	−85 kg	155	12	201	8	356	10

Women

Athlete	Event	Snatch		Clean & Jerk		Total	Rank
Athlete	Event	Result	Rank	Result	Rank	Total	Rank
Mercedes Pérez	−63 kg	97	8	120	8	217	8
Tulia Medina	−69 kg	106	4	124	6	230	6
Leydi Solís	−69 kg	105	5	135	3	240	2nd place, silver medalist(s)
Ubaldina Valoyes	−75 kg	110	6	134	8	244	7

== Wrestling ==
Key:

- VT - Victory by Fall.
- PP - Decision by Points - the loser with technical points.
- PO - Decision by Points - the loser without technical points.

Men's freestyle

Athlete	Event	Qualification	Round of 16	Quarterfinal	Semifinal	Repechage 1	Repechage 2	Final / BM	
Athlete	Event	Opposition Result	Opposition Result	Opposition Result	Opposition Result	Opposition Result	Opposition Result	Opposition Result	Rank
Fredy Serrano	−55 kg	Bye	Dabbaghi (IRI); L 1–3 ^{PP}	Did not advance					14
Jarlis Mosquera	−84 kg	Bye	Danko (UKR); L 0–3 ^{PO}	Did not advance					19

Women's freestyle

Athlete	Event	Round of 16	Quarterfinal	Semifinal	Repechage 1	Repechage 2	Final / BM	
Athlete	Event	Opposition Result	Opposition Result	Opposition Result	Opposition Result	Opposition Result	Opposition Result	Rank
Jackeline Rentería	−55 kg	Amri (TUN); W 5–0 ^{VT}	Van Dusen (USA); W 3–1 ^{PP}	Xu L (CHN); L 0–5 ^{VT}	Bye		Pavăl (ROU); W 5–0 ^{VT}	3rd place, bronze medalist(s)

== See also ==
- Colombia at the 2007 Pan American Games
- Colombia at the 2008 Summer Paralympics
- Colombia at the 2010 Central American and Caribbean Games
