= Wrestling at the 2008 Summer Olympics =

Wrestling at the Games of the XXIX Olympiad
- Venue: China Agricultural University Gymnasium
- Dates: 12–21 August 2008
- No. of events: 18
- Competitors: 344 from 59 nations

Wrestling competitions at the 2008 Summer Olympics in Beijing, China, were held at the China Agricultural University Gymnasium from 12–21 August 2008. It was split into two disciplines, Freestyle and Greco-Roman which are further divided into different weight categories. Men competed in both disciplines whereas women only took part in the freestyle events with 18 gold medals being awarded. This was the second Olympics with women's wrestling as an event.

== Medalists ==
=== Men's freestyle ===
Event	Gold	Silver	Bronze
55 kg	Henry Cejudo; United States	Tomohiro Matsunaga; Japan	Radoslav Velikov; Bulgaria
55 kg	Henry Cejudo; United States	Tomohiro Matsunaga; Japan	Besik Kudukhov; Russia
60 kg^{[a]}	Mavlet Batirov; Russia	Kenichi Yumoto; Japan	Bazar Bazarguruev; Kyrgyzstan
60 kg^{[a]}	Mavlet Batirov; Russia	Kenichi Yumoto; Japan	Morad Mohammadi; Iran
66 kg	Ramazan Şahin; Turkey	Andriy Stadnik; Ukraine	Otar Tushishvili; Georgia
66 kg	Ramazan Şahin; Turkey	Andriy Stadnik; Ukraine	Sushil Kumar; India
74 kg^{[b]}	Buvaisar Saitiev; Russia	Murad Gaidarov; Belarus	Gheorghiță Ștefan; Romania
74 kg^{[b]}	Buvaisar Saitiev; Russia	Murad Gaidarov; Belarus	Kiril Terziev; Bulgaria
84 kg	Revaz Mindorashvili; Georgia	Yusup Abdusalomov; Tajikistan	Taras Danko; Ukraine
84 kg	Revaz Mindorashvili; Georgia	Yusup Abdusalomov; Tajikistan	Georgy Ketoev; Russia
96 kg^{[c]}	Shirvani Muradov; Russia	Giorgi Gogshelidze; Georgia	Michel Batista; Cuba
96 kg^{[c]}	Shirvani Muradov; Russia	Giorgi Gogshelidze; Georgia	Khetag Gazyumov; Azerbaijan
120 kg^{[d]}	Bakhtiyar Akhmedov; Russia	David Musuľbes; Slovakia	Disney Rodríguez; Cuba
120 kg^{[d]}	Bakhtiyar Akhmedov; Russia	David Musuľbes; Slovakia	Marid Mutalimov; Kazakhstan

=== Men's Greco-Roman ===
Event	Gold	Silver	Bronze
55 kg	Nazyr Mankiev; Russia	Rovshan Bayramov; Azerbaijan	Roman Amoyan; Armenia
55 kg	Nazyr Mankiev; Russia	Rovshan Bayramov; Azerbaijan	Park Eun-chul; South Korea
60 kg^{[e]}	Islambek Albiev; Russia	Nurbakyt Tengizbayev; Kazakhstan	Ruslan Tyumenbayev; Kyrgyzstan
60 kg^{[e]}	Islambek Albiev; Russia	Nurbakyt Tengizbayev; Kazakhstan	Sheng Jiang; China
66 kg	Steeve Guénot; France	Kanatbek Begaliev; Kyrgyzstan	Armen Vardanyan; Ukraine
66 kg	Steeve Guénot; France	Kanatbek Begaliev; Kyrgyzstan	Mikhail Siamionau; Belarus
74 kg	Manuchar Kvirkvelia; Georgia	Chang Yongxiang; China	Yavor Yanakiev; Bulgaria
74 kg	Manuchar Kvirkvelia; Georgia	Chang Yongxiang; China	Christophe Guénot; France
84 kg^{[f]}	Andrea Minguzzi; Italy	Zoltán Fodor; Hungary	Nazmi Avluca; Turkey
84 kg^{[f]}	Andrea Minguzzi; Italy	Zoltán Fodor; Hungary	None awarded
96 kg^{[g]}	Aslanbek Khushtov; Russia	Mirko Englich; Germany	Adam Wheeler; United States
96 kg^{[g]}	Aslanbek Khushtov; Russia	Mirko Englich; Germany	Marek Švec; Czech Republic
120 kg^{[h]}	Mijaín López; Cuba	Mindaugas Mizgaitis; Lithuania	Yannick Szczepaniak; France
120 kg^{[h]}	Mijaín López; Cuba	Mindaugas Mizgaitis; Lithuania	Yury Patrikeyev; Armenia

=== Women's freestyle ===
Event	Gold	Silver	Bronze
48 kg	Carol Huynh; Canada	Chiharu Icho; Japan	Mariya Stadnik; Azerbaijan
48 kg	Carol Huynh; Canada	Chiharu Icho; Japan	Iryna Merleni; Ukraine
55 kg	Saori Yoshida; Japan	Xu Li; China	Tonya Verbeek; Canada
55 kg	Saori Yoshida; Japan	Xu Li; China	Jackeline Rentería; Colombia
63 kg	Kaori Icho; Japan	Alena Kartashova; Russia	Yelena Shalygina; Kazakhstan
63 kg	Kaori Icho; Japan	Alena Kartashova; Russia	Randi Miller; United States
72 kg	Wang Jiao; China	Stanka Zlateva; Bulgaria	Kyoko Hamaguchi; Japan
72 kg	Wang Jiao; China	Stanka Zlateva; Bulgaria	Agnieszka Wieszczek; Poland

- ^{Men's freestyle 60 kg} Vasyl Fedoryshyn of Ukraine originally won the silver medal, but was disqualified in 2016 after failing an anti-doping retest. United World Wrestling has reallocated medals accordingly.
- ^{Men's freestyle 74 kg} Soslan Tigiev of Uzbekistan originally won the silver medal, but was disqualified in 2016 after failing an anti-doping retest. United World Wrestling has reallocated medals accordingly.
- ^{Men's freestyle 96 kg} Taimuraz Tigiyev of Kazakhstan originally won the silver medal, but was disqualified in 2016 after failing an anti-doping retest. United World Wrestling has reallocated medals accordingly.
- ^{Men's freestyle 120 kg} Artur Taymazov of Uzbekistan originally won the gold medal, but was disqualified in 2016 after failing an anti-doping retest. United World Wrestling has reallocated medals accordingly.
- ^{Men's Greco-Roman 60 kg} Vitaliy Rahimov of Azerbaijan originally won the silver medal, but was disqualified in 2016 after failing an anti-doping retest. United World Wrestling has reallocated medals accordingly.
- ^{Men's Greco-Roman 84 kg} Ara Abrahamian of Sweden originally won one of the two bronze medals, but was disqualified by the IOC after he walked off the podium and placed his medal in the center of the mat to protest a judge's decision which cost him his match against the eventual gold medallist, Andrea Minguzzi from Italy. The Court of Arbitration for Sport held a hearing based on the request, which was issued by Abrahamian and the Swedish Olympic Committee against the FILA. Preceding the hearing, CAS declared in a statement that Abrahamian and the SOC "do not seek from the CAS any particular relief" regarding the ranking of the medals or a review of the IOC decision to exclude Abrahamian from the Games. Following the CAS, issued an arbitration strongly criticizing FILA. While not challenging the outcome of the match or the technical judgments, the arbitration stated that the FILA was required to provide an appeal jury capable to deal promptly with the claims of the athletes. The chairman of the SOC, Stefan Lindeberg, commented that the decision once and for all shows that FILA did not act correctly and that they did not follow their own rules of fair play.
- ^{Men's Greco-Roman 96 kg} Asset Mambetov of Kazakhstan originally won one of the two bronze medals, but was disqualified in 2016 after failing an anti-doping retest. United World Wrestling has reallocated medals accordingly.
- ^{Men's Greco-Roman 120 kg} Khasan Baroev of Russia originally won the silver medal, but was disqualified in 2016 after failing an anti-doping retest. United World Wrestling has reallocated medals accordingly.

== Medal table ==
Rank	Nation	Gold	Silver	Bronze	Total
1	Russia	7	1	2	10
2	Japan	2	3	1	6
3	Georgia	2	1	1	4
4	China	1	2	1	4
5	Cuba	1	0	2	3
5	France	1	0	2	3
5	United States	1	0	2	3
8	Canada	1	0	1	2
8	Turkey	1	0	1	2
10	Italy	1	0	0	1
11	Bulgaria	0	1	3	4
11	Ukraine	0	1	3	4
13	Azerbaijan	0	1	2	3
13	Kazakhstan	0	1	2	3
13	Kyrgyzstan	0	1	2	3
16	Belarus	0	1	1	2
17	Germany	0	1	0	1
17	Hungary	0	1	0	1
17	Lithuania	0	1	0	1
17	Slovakia	0	1	0	1
17	Tajikistan	0	1	0	1
22	Armenia	0	0	2	2
23	Colombia	0	0	1	1
23	Czech Republic	0	0	1	1
23	India	0	0	1	1
23	Iran	0	0	1	1
23	Poland	0	0	1	1
23	Romania	0	0	1	1
23	South Korea	0	0	1	1
Totals (29 entries)		18	18	35	71

== Participating nations ==
A total of 344 wrestlers from 59 nations competed at the Beijing Games:

- Albania (2)
- Algeria (3)
- Armenia (9)
- Australia (4)
- Azerbaijan (16)
- Belarus (9)
- Brazil (1)
- Bulgaria (12)
- Cameroon (1)
- Canada (10)
- China (16)
- Colombia (3)
- Cuba (12)
- Czech Republic (1)
- Denmark (2)
- Egypt (7)
- El Salvador (1)
- Finland (1)
- France (9)
- Georgia (10)
- Germany (7)
- Greece (3)
- Guam (1)
- Guinea-Bissau (1)
- Hungary (9)
- India (3)
- Iran (12)
- Italy (2)
- Japan (10)
- Kazakhstan (16)
- Kyrgyzstan (5)
- Lithuania (4)
- Macedonia (1)
- Mexico (1)
- Moldova (2)
- Mongolia (6)
- Nigeria (2)
- North Korea (3)
- Norway (1)
- Palau (2)
- Peru (1)
- Poland (9)
- Romania (8)
- Russia (18)
- Senegal (1)
- Serbia (2)
- Slovakia (2)
- South Africa (1)
- South Korea (11)
- Spain (3)
- Sweden (5)
- Switzerland (1)
- Tajikistan (2)
- Tunisia (3)
- Turkey (13)
- Ukraine (16)
- United States (17)
- Uzbekistan (8)
- Venezuela (3)
