= Iran at the 2008 Summer Olympics =

- IOC code: IRI
- NOC: National Olympic Committee of the Islamic Republic of Iran
- Website: www.olympic.ir (in Persian and English)

in Beijing, China
- Competitors: 55 in 13 sports
- Flag bearer: Homa Hosseini
- Medals Ranked 51st: Gold 1 Silver 0 Bronze 1 Total 2

Summer Olympics appearances (overview)
- 1900; 1904–1936; 1948; 1952; 1956; 1960; 1964; 1968; 1972; 1976; 1980–1984; 1988; 1992; 1996; 2000; 2004; 2008; 2012; 2016; 2020; 2024; 2028

Iran sent a team to compete at the 2008 Summer Olympics in Beijing, China. In total 55 Iranian athletes went to Beijing, including three women. These Olympics are regarded as less successful than their previous Games, as Iran only achieved one gold and one bronze medal.

== Medalists ==
Medal	Name	Sport	Event
Gold	Hadi Saei	Taekwondo	Men's 80 kg
Bronze	Morad Mohammadi	Wrestling	Men's freestyle 60 kg

Medals by sport
Sport	1st place, gold medalist(s)	2nd place, silver medalist(s)	3rd place, bronze medalist(s)	Total
Taekwondo	1	0	0	1
Wrestling	0	0	1	1
Total	1	0	1	2

== Competitors ==
Sport	Men	Women	Total
Archery	1	1	2
Athletics	6	0	6
Badminton	1	0	1
Basketball	12	0	12
Boxing	3	0	3
Cycling	3	0	3
Judo	6	0	6
Rowing	1	1	2
Swimming	1	0	1
Table tennis	1	0	1
Taekwondo	2	1	3
Weightlifting	3	0	3
Wrestling	12	0	12
Total	52	3	55

== Archery ==
Athlete	Event	Ranking round		Round of 64	Round of 32	Round of 16	Quarterfinals	Semifinals	Final / BM	
Athlete	Event	Score	Seed	Opposition Score	Opposition Score	Opposition Score	Opposition Score	Opposition Score	Opposition Score	Rank
Hojjatollah Vaezi	Men's individual	604	63	Champia (IND); L 98–112	Did not advance					
Najmeh Abtin	Women's individual	568	60	Kwon U-S (PRK); L 96–106	Did not advance					

== Athletics ==
Key

- Note–Ranks given for track events are within the athlete's heat only
- Q = Qualified for the next round
- q = Qualified for the next round as a fastest loser or, in field events, by position without achieving the qualifying target
- NR = National record
- N/A = Round not applicable for the event
- Bye = Athlete not required to compete in round

Men
Track & road events

Athlete	Event	Heat		Semifinal		Final	
Athlete	Event	Result	Rank	Result	Rank	Result	Rank
Sajjad Moradi	800 m	1:46.10	6 q	1:46.08	5	Did not advance	
Ehsan Mohajer Shojaei	800 m	1:49.25	8	Did not advance			

Field events

Athlete	Event	Qualification		Final	
Athlete	Event	Distance	Position	Distance	Position
Ehsan Haddadi	Discus throw	61.34	17	Did not advance	
Amin Nikfar	Shot put	NM	—	Did not advance	
Abbas Samimi	Discus throw	59.92	26	Did not advance	

Combined events – Decathlon

Athlete	Event	100 m	LJ	SP	HJ	400 m	110H	DT	PV	JT	1500 m	Final	Rank
Hadi Sepehrzad	Result	10.92	6.80	16.02	1.90	50.75	14.64	50.32	4.00	49.56	5:06.67	7483	21
Hadi Sepehrzad	Points	878	767	852	714	780	894	877	617	582	522	7483	21

== Badminton ==
Athlete	Event	Round of 64	Round of 32	Round of 16	Quarterfinal	Semifinal	Final / BM	
Athlete	Event	Opposition Score	Opposition Score	Opposition Score	Opposition Score	Opposition Score	Opposition Score	Rank
Kaveh Mehrabi	Men's singles	Hsieh (TPE); L 16–21, 12–21	Did not advance					

== Basketball ==
=== Men's tournament ===
Roster

The following is the Iran roster in the men's basketball tournament of the 2008 Summer Olympics.

Iran men's national basketball team – 2008 Summer Olympics roster
Players
Coaches

Pos.	No.	Name	Age – Date of birth	Height	Club	Ctr.
F/C	4	Ali Doraghi	23 – September 20, 1984	6 ft 11 in (2.11 m)	Petrochimi	(Iran)
PG	5	Amir Amini	24 – June 10, 1984	6 ft 3 in (1.91 m)	Kaveh	(Iran)
PG	6	Javad Davari	25 – April 25, 1983	6 ft 1 in (1.85 m)	Petrochimi	(Iran)
PG	7	Mehdi Kamrani	26 – June 1, 1982	5 ft 11 in (1.8 m)	Mahram	(Iran)
SG	8	Saeid Davarpanah	20 – September 7, 1987	6 ft 3 in (1.91 m)	Kaveh	(Iran)
SG	9	Iman Zandi	26 – September 19, 1981	6 ft 2 in (1.88 m)	BEEM	(Iran)
SG	10	Hamed Afagh	25 – February 1, 1983	6 ft 4 in (1.93 m)	Saba Battery	(Iran)
F/C	11	Hamed Sohrabnejad	25 – May 7, 1983	6 ft 9 in (2.06 m)	Mahram	(Iran)
PF	12	Oshin Sahakian	22 – March 21, 1986	6 ft 7 in (2.01 m)	Zob Ahan	(Iran)
C	13	Mousa Nabipour	24 – August 14, 1983	6 ft 11 in (2.11 m)	Kaveh	(Iran)
SF	14	Samad Nikkhah Bahrami (C)	25 – May 11, 1983	6 ft 7 in (2.01 m)	Mahram	(Iran)
C	15	Hamed Haddadi	23 – May 19, 1985	7 ft 2 in (2.18 m)	Saba Battery	(Iran)

Head coach

- (Serbia) Rajko Toroman

Assistant coach(es)

- (Iran) Mehran Hatami
- (Serbia) Srđan Petković

Legend

- (C) Team captain
- nat field describes country
  of last club
  before the tournament
- Age field is age on August 9, 2008

Group play

Pos	Team	Pld	W	L	PF	PA	PD	Pts	Qualification
1	Lithuania	5	4	1	425	400	+25	9 (Note: Head-to-head record: Lithuania 1–0 Argentina)	Quarterfinals
2	Argentina	5	4	1	425	361	+64	9	Quarterfinals
3	Croatia	5	3	2	399	380	+19	8 (Note: Head-to-head record: Croatia 1–0 Australia)	Quarterfinals
4	Australia	5	3	2	457	405	+52	8	Quarterfinals
5	Russia	5	1	4	387	406	−19	6	
6	Iran	5	0	5	323	464	−141	5	

Source: FIBA archive
Rules for classification: 1) points; 2) head-to-head points; 3) head-to-head goal average; 4) head-to-head number of points scored.
Notes:

10 August 2008
09:00

Report

Russia	71–49	Iran
Scoring by quarter: 24–5, 14–17, 8–16, 25–11
Pts: Holden 19; Rebs: Monia 6 Asts: Savrasenko 4		Pts: Nikkhah 16; Rebs: Haddadi 8 Asts: Kamrani 3

Wukesong Indoor Stadium, Beijing
Attendance: 11,083
Referees: Nikolaos Pitsilkas (GRE)

12 August 2008
09:00

Report

Iran	67–99	Lithuania
Scoring by quarter: 20–15, 14–31, 19–28, 14–25
Pts: Haddadi 21; Rebs: Sahakian 12; Asts: Amini 4		Pts: Kleiza 22; Rebs: Kleiza 8 Asts: Jasikevičius, Lukauskis, Mačiulis 3

Wukesong Indoor Stadium, Beijing
Attendance: 11,083
Referees: Eddie Rush (USA)

14 August 2008
11:15

Report

Australia	106–68	Iran
Scoring by quarter: 28–15, 25–14, 22–19, 31–20
Pts: Newley 24; Rebs: Bogut 7 Asts: Mills, Worthington, Bruton 5		Pts: Nikkhah 23; Rebs: Haddadi 8 Asts: Davari 4

Wukesong Indoor Stadium, Beijing
Attendance: 11,083
Referees: Nikolaos Zavlanos (GRE)

16 August 2008
16:45

Report

Iran	82–97	Argentina
Scoring by quarter: 14–19, 19–23, 24–30, 25–25
Pts: Haddadi 21; Rebs: Haddadi 16; Asts: Kamrani 4		Pts: Ginobili 32; Rebs: Scola 7 Asts: Prigioni 6

Wukesong Indoor Stadium, Beijing
Attendance: 11,083
Referees: Nikolaos Pitsilkas (GRE)

18 August 2008
09:00

Report

Iran	57–91	Croatia
Scoring by quarter: 8–19, 8–35, 23–16, 18–21
Pts: Nikkhah 25; Rebs: Haddadi 15; Asts: Haddadi 2		Pts: Rozić, Tomas 16; Rebs: Lončar, Barać 7 Asts: Ukić 8

Wukesong Indoor Stadium, Beijing
Attendance: 11,083
Referees: Carl Jungebrand (FIN)

== Boxing ==
Athlete	Event	Round of 32	Round of 16	Quarterfinals	Semifinals	Final	
Athlete	Event	Opposition Result	Opposition Result	Opposition Result	Opposition Result	Opposition Result	Rank
Morteza Sepahvand	Light welterweight	Hassini (TUN); W 16–4	Gheorghe (ROU); W 8–4	Díaz (DOM); L 6–11	Did not advance		
Mehdi Ghorbani	Light heavyweight	Negrón (PUR); L 4–13	Did not advance				
Ali Mazaheri	Heavyweight	—N/a	Chakhkiyev (RUS); L 3–7	Did not advance			

== Cycling ==
=== Road ===
Athlete	Event	Time	Rank
Hossein Askari	Men's road race	6:34:22	51
Hossein Askari	Men's time trial	1:08:46	34
Ghader Mizbani	Men's road race	6:39:42	78
Mehdi Sohrabi	Men's road race	Did not finish	

== Judo ==
Men

Athlete	Event	Preliminary	Round of 32	Round of 16	Quarterfinals	Semifinals	Repechage 1	Repechage 2	Repechage 3	Final / BM	
Athlete	Event	Opposition Result	Opposition Result	Opposition Result	Opposition Result	Opposition Result	Opposition Result	Opposition Result	Opposition Result	Opposition Result	Rank
Masoud Akhondzadeh	−60 kg	Bye	Drakšič (SLO); W 0110–0010	Choi (KOR); L 0000–1000	Did not advance		Albarracín (ARG); W 0020–0001	Sobirov (UZB); L 0001–0010	Did not advance		
Arash Miresmaeili	−66 kg	Bye	Adamiec (POL); W 0001–0000	Uchishiba (JPN); L 0000–0020	Did not advance		Jacinto (DOM); W 0011–0000	Sharipov (UZB); L 0001–0010	Did not advance		
Ali Maloumat	−73 kg	—N/a	Kanamaru (JPN); W 1001–0001	Pina (POR); W 0111–0001	Dashdavaa (MGL); W 1100–0010	Mammadli (AZE); L 0000–1000	Bye			Guilheiro (BRA); L 0000–1000	5
Hamed Malekmohammadi	−81 kg	Bye	Sedej (SLO); W 1000–0000	Camilo (BRA); L 0000–1010	Did not advance						
Hossein Ghomi	−90 kg	—N/a	Kazusionak (BLR); L 0000–1110	Did not advance							
Mohammad Reza Roudaki	+100 kg	Bye	Rybak (BLR); W 1001–0001	Jónsson (ISL); W 1000–0001	Gujejiani (GEO); L 0000–0011	Did not advance	Bye	McCormick (USA); W 1001–0001	Tmenov (RUS); W 1010–0001	Brayson (CUB); L 0000–0200	5

== Rowing ==
Men

Athlete	Event	Heats		Quarterfinals		Semifinals		Final	
Athlete	Event	Time	Rank	Time	Rank	Time	Rank	Time	Rank
Mohsen Shadi	Single sculls	7:48.24	5 SE/F	Bye		7:20.34	1 FE	7:06.54	25

Women

Athlete	Event	Heats		Quarterfinals		Semifinals		Final	
Athlete	Event	Time	Rank	Time	Rank	Time	Rank	Time	Rank
Homa Hosseini	Single sculls	9:02.12	4 FE	Bye				8:18.20	26

Qualification Legend: FA=Final A (medal); FB=Final B (non-medal); FC=Final C (non-medal); FD=Final D (non-medal); FE=Final E (non-medal); FF=Final F (non-medal); SA/B=Semifinals A/B; SC/D=Semifinals C/D; SE/F=Semifinals E/F; QF=Quarterfinals; R=Repechage

== Swimming ==
Men

Athlete	Event	Heat		Semifinal		Final	
Athlete	Event	Time	Rank	Time	Rank	Time	Rank
Mohammad Alirezaei	100 m breaststroke	DNS		Did not advance			

== Table tennis ==
Athlete	Event	Preliminary round	Round 1	Round 2	Round 3	Round 4	Quarterfinals	Semifinals	Final / BM	
Athlete	Event	Opposition Result	Opposition Result	Opposition Result	Opposition Result	Opposition Result	Opposition Result	Opposition Result	Opposition Result	Rank
Afshin Norouzi	Men's singles	Bobocica (ITA); L 2–4	Did not advance							

== Taekwondo ==
Athlete	Event	Round of 16	Quarterfinals	Semifinals	Repechage	Bronze Medal	Final	
Athlete	Event	Opposition Result	Opposition Result	Opposition Result	Opposition Result	Opposition Result	Opposition Result	Rank
Reza Naderian	Men's −58 kg	Wenceslau (BRA); L 1–2	Did not advance					
Hadi Saei	Men's −80 kg	Bista (NEP); W 7–0	Zhu G (CHN); W 3–2	Ahmadov (AZE); W 4–1	Bye		Sarmiento (ITA); W 6–4	1st place, gold medalist(s)
Sara Khoshjamal Fekri	Women's −49 kg	Toudali (MAR); W 5–0	Yang S-C (TPE); L 0–2	Did not advance				

== Weightlifting ==
Athlete	Event	Snatch		Clean & Jerk		Total	Rank
Athlete	Event	Result	Rank	Result	Rank	Total	Rank
Asghar Ebrahimi	Men's −94 kg	180	1	212	4	392	4
Mohsen Biranvand	Men's −105 kg	180	9	210	11	390	9
Rashid Sharifi	Men's +105 kg	196	6	230	6	426	6

== Wrestling ==
Key:

- VT - Victory by Fall.
- PP - Decision by Points - the loser with technical points.
- PO - Decision by Points - the loser without technical points.

Men's freestyle

Athlete	Event	Qualification	Round of 16	Quarterfinal	Semifinal	Repechage 1	Repechage 2	Final / BM	
Athlete	Event	Opposition Result	Opposition Result	Opposition Result	Opposition Result	Opposition Result	Opposition Result	Opposition Result	Rank
Abbas Dabbaghi	−55 kg	Bye	Serrano (COL); W 3–1 ^{PP}	Kudukhov (RUS); L 0–3 ^{PO}	Did not advance				10
Morad Mohammadi	−60 kg	Bye	Madany (EGY); W 3–0 ^{PO}	Azarbayjani (CAN); W 3–0 ^{PO}	Batirov (RUS); L 0–3 ^{PO}	Bye		Huseynov (AZE); W 3–1 ^{PP}	3rd place, bronze medalist(s)
Mehdi Taghavi	−66 kg	Bye	Garcia (CAN); W 3–1 ^{PP}	Şahin (TUR); L 0–3 ^{PO}	Did not advance	Bye	Garzón (CUB); L 1–3 ^{PP}	Did not advance	10
Meisam Mostafa-Jokar	−74 kg	Bye	Terziev (BUL); L 0–3 ^{PO}	Did not advance					19
Reza Yazdani	−84 kg	Horbik (POL); W 3–0 ^{PO}	Temrezov (AZE); L 0–5 ^{VT}	Did not advance					11
Saeid Ebrahimi	−96 kg	Bye	Emara (EGY); W 3–1 ^{PP}	Gogshelidze (GEO); L 0–3 ^{PO}	Did not advance				10
Fardin Masoumi	−120 kg	Langowski (MEX); W 3–0 ^{PO}	Akhmedov (RUS); L 0–5 ^{VT}	Did not advance		Boyadzhiev (BUL); W 3–1 ^{PP}	Mocco (USA); W 3–1 ^{PP}	Mutalimov (KAZ); L 1–3 ^{PP}	5

Men's Greco-Roman

Athlete	Event	Qualification	Round of 16	Quarterfinal	Semifinal	Repechage 1	Repechage 2	Final / BM	
Athlete	Event	Opposition Result	Opposition Result	Opposition Result	Opposition Result	Opposition Result	Opposition Result	Opposition Result	Rank
Hamid Sourian	−55 kg	Venkov (BUL); W 5–0 ^{VT}	Elwais (PLW); W 3–0 ^{PO}	Mankiev (RUS); L 1–3 ^{PP}	Did not advance	Bye	Fris (SRB); W 3–1 ^{PP}	Park E-C (KOR); L 1–3 ^{PP}	5
Ali Mohammadi	−66 kg	Kim M-C (KOR); W 3–1 ^{PP}	Siamionau (BLR); L 1–3 ^{PP}	Did not advance					11
Saman Tahmasebi	−84 kg	Bye	Daragan (UKR); W 3–1 ^{PP}	Avluca (TUR); L 1–3 ^{PP}	Did not advance				11
Ghasem Rezaei	−96 kg	Ežerskis (LTU); L 1–3 ^{PP}	Did not advance						16
Masoud Hashemzadeh	−120 kg	Bye	Baroev (RUS); L 0–3 ^{PO}	Did not advance		Bye	Mizgaitis (LTU); L 1–3 ^{PP}	Did not advance	15
