= Sokhiev =

Sokhiev is a surname. Notable people with the surname include:

- Tugan Sokhiev (born 1977), Russian-Ossetian conductor
- Zaurbek Sokhiev (born 1986), Russian-Ossetian freestyle wrestler
