= Homa Hosseini =

Iranian rower (born 1988)

Homa Hosseini (Persian: هما حسینی; born 22 December 1988) is an Iranian rower born in Kermanshah.

She represented Iran in the single sculls event at the 2008 Summer Olympics in Beijing. Hosseini was one of three female Iranian competitors at the Games, and was the first-ever female Iranian Olympic rower. She also was her country's flagbearer at the Games' opening ceremony.

Olympic Games
Preceded by Arash Miresmaeili	Flagbearer for Iran; Beijing 2008	Succeeded by Ali Mazaheri
