= Andrey Samokhin =

Kazakhstani wrestler (born 1985)

Personal information
- Nationality: Kazakhstan
- Born: 20 January 1985 (age 41) Karaganda, Kazakh SSR, Soviet Union
- Height: 1.80 m (5 ft 11 in)
- Weight: 84 kg (185 lb)

Sport
- Sport: Wrestling
- Event: Greco-Roman
- Club: ZOP Alma-Ata
- Coached by: Nurgazin Rezbek
Medal record
Men's Greco-Roman wrestling
Representing Kazakhstan
Asian Championships
Silver medal – second place	2009 Pattaya	84 kg
Bronze medal – third place	2008 Jeju City	84 kg

Andrey Samokhin (Kazakh: Андре́й Юрьевич Самохин; born January 20, 1985) is an amateur Kazakh Greco-Roman wrestler, who played for the men's light heavyweight category. He won a bronze medal for his division at the 2008 Asian Wrestling Championships in Jeju City, South Korea, and silver at the 2009 Asian Wrestling Championships in Pattaya, Thailand.

Samokhin represented Kazakhstan at the 2008 Summer Olympics, where he competed for the men's 84 kg class. He received a bye for the second preliminary round, before losing out to Russia's Alexei Mishin, with a two-set technical score (1–2, 0–3), and a classification point score of 1–3.
