= 2008 Asian Wrestling Championships =

- Host city: Jeju, South Korea
- Dates: 18–23 March 2008
- Stadium: Halla Gymnasium

Champions
- Freestyle: Japan
- Greco-Roman: Iran
- Women: Japan

The 2008 Asian Wrestling Championships were held in Jeju, South Korea. The event took place from March 18 to March 23, 2008.

== Medal table ==
Rank	Nation	Gold	Silver	Bronze	Total
1	Japan	7	1	7	15
2	Iran	4	3	2	9
3	China	3	1	5	9
4	South Korea	3	1	4	8
5	Kyrgyzstan	1	2	1	4
6	Uzbekistan	1	1	4	6
7	North Korea	1	1	2	4
8	India	1	0	3	4
9	Kazakhstan	0	6	6	12
10	Mongolia	0	5	3	8
11	Chinese Taipei	0	0	2	2
12	Syria	0	0	1	1
12	Tajikistan	0	0	1	1
12	Vietnam	0	0	1	1
Totals (14 entries)		21	21	42	84

== Team ranking ==
Rank	Men's freestyle		Men's Greco-Roman		Women's freestyle	
Rank	Team	Points	Team	Points	Team	Points
1	Japan	49	Iran	55	Japan	64
2	Iran	48	Kazakhstan	50	China	57
3	Mongolia	47	Japan	49	Kazakhstan	53
4	South Korea	40	Kyrgyzstan	42	Mongolia	45
5	Kazakhstan	39	South Korea	42	India	40
6	Uzbekistan	37	Uzbekistan	38	South Korea	35
7	China	32	China	28	Chinese Taipei	34
8	India	31	North Korea	23	Vietnam	14
9	North Korea	24	India	23	Kyrgyzstan	10
10	Syria	14	Chinese Taipei	16	Uzbekistan	9

== Medal summary ==
=== Men's freestyle ===
Event	Gold	Silver	Bronze
55 kg	Tomohiro Matsunaga; Japan	Yang Jae-hoon; South Korea	Kim Sun-nam; North Korea
55 kg	Tomohiro Matsunaga; Japan	Yang Jae-hoon; South Korea	Firas Al-Rifaei; Syria
60 kg	Yogeshwar Dutt; India	Noriyuki Takatsuka; Japan	Vais Tlegenov; Uzbekistan
60 kg	Yogeshwar Dutt; India	Noriyuki Takatsuka; Japan	Morad Mohammadi; Iran
66 kg	Yang Chun-song; North Korea	Pürevjavyn Önörbat; Mongolia	Kazuhiko Ikematsu; Japan
66 kg	Yang Chun-song; North Korea	Pürevjavyn Önörbat; Mongolia	Sushil Kumar; India
74 kg	Cho Byung-kwan; South Korea	Meisam Mostafa-Jokar; Iran	Kazuyuki Nagashima; Japan
74 kg	Cho Byung-kwan; South Korea	Meisam Mostafa-Jokar; Iran	Dorjvaanchigiin Gombodorj; Mongolia
84 kg	Wang Ying; China	Chagnaadorjiin Ganzorig; Mongolia	Abdul Ammaev; Uzbekistan
84 kg	Wang Ying; China	Chagnaadorjiin Ganzorig; Mongolia	Yusup Abdusalomov; Tajikistan
96 kg	Kurban Kurbanov; Uzbekistan	Amir Abbas Moradi Ganji; Iran	Koo Tae-hyun; South Korea
96 kg	Kurban Kurbanov; Uzbekistan	Amir Abbas Moradi Ganji; Iran	Daulet Shabanbay; Kazakhstan
120 kg	Fardin Masoumi; Iran	Marid Mutalimov; Kazakhstan	Jargalsaikhany Chuluunbat; Mongolia
120 kg	Fardin Masoumi; Iran	Marid Mutalimov; Kazakhstan	Liang Lei; China

=== Men's Greco-Roman ===
Event	Gold	Silver	Bronze
55 kg	Hamid Sourian; Iran	Cha Kwang-su; North Korea	Kohei Hasegawa; Japan
55 kg	Hamid Sourian; Iran	Cha Kwang-su; North Korea	Yermek Kuketov; Kazakhstan
60 kg	Ruslan Tyumenbayev; Kyrgyzstan	Dilshod Aripov; Uzbekistan	Hideo Kitaoka; Japan
60 kg	Ruslan Tyumenbayev; Kyrgyzstan	Dilshod Aripov; Uzbekistan	Yerbol Konyratov; Kazakhstan
66 kg	Kim Min-chul; South Korea	Kanatbek Begaliev; Kyrgyzstan	Masaki Imuro; Japan
66 kg	Kim Min-chul; South Korea	Kanatbek Begaliev; Kyrgyzstan	Kim Kum-chol; North Korea
74 kg	Chang Yongxiang; China	Daniar Kobonov; Kyrgyzstan	Jung Tae-kyun; South Korea
74 kg	Chang Yongxiang; China	Daniar Kobonov; Kyrgyzstan	Mehdi Mohammadi; Iran
84 kg	Shingo Matsumoto; Japan	Taleb Nematpour; Iran	Cho Hyo-chul; South Korea
84 kg	Shingo Matsumoto; Japan	Taleb Nematpour; Iran	Andrey Samokhin; Kazakhstan
96 kg	Ghasem Rezaei; Iran	Margulan Assembekov; Kazakhstan	Han Tae-young; South Korea
96 kg	Ghasem Rezaei; Iran	Margulan Assembekov; Kazakhstan	Abdulmalik Aliev; Uzbekistan
120 kg	Masoud Hashemzadeh; Iran	Georgiy Tsurtsumia; Kazakhstan	Davyd Saldadze; Uzbekistan
120 kg	Masoud Hashemzadeh; Iran	Georgiy Tsurtsumia; Kazakhstan	Hirokazu Shinjo; Japan

=== Women's freestyle ===
Event	Gold	Silver	Bronze
48 kg	Chiharu Icho; Japan	Ren Xuecheng; China	Neha Rathi; India
48 kg	Chiharu Icho; Japan	Ren Xuecheng; China	Tsogtbazaryn Enkhjargal; Mongolia
51 kg	Um Hye-jin; South Korea	Zhuldyz Eshimova; Kazakhstan	Phạm Thị Huệ; Vietnam
51 kg	Um Hye-jin; South Korea	Zhuldyz Eshimova; Kazakhstan	Huang Wenjuan; China
55 kg	Saori Yoshida; Japan	Saltanat Abdrakhmanova; Kazakhstan	Su Ying-tzu; Chinese Taipei
55 kg	Saori Yoshida; Japan	Saltanat Abdrakhmanova; Kazakhstan	Xu Li; China
59 kg	Li Songni; China	Olga Smirnova; Kazakhstan	Anita Sheoran; India
59 kg	Li Songni; China	Olga Smirnova; Kazakhstan	Mizuka Kajita; Japan
63 kg	Kaori Icho; Japan	Badrakhyn Odonchimeg; Mongolia	Yelena Shalygina; Kazakhstan
63 kg	Kaori Icho; Japan	Badrakhyn Odonchimeg; Mongolia	Hou Min-wen; Chinese Taipei
67 kg	Mami Shinkai; Japan	Ochirbatyn Nasanburmaa; Mongolia	Darya Karpenko; Kazakhstan
67 kg	Mami Shinkai; Japan	Ochirbatyn Nasanburmaa; Mongolia	Zhang Fengliu; China
72 kg	Kyoko Hamaguchi; Japan	Ochirbatyn Burmaa; Mongolia	Xu Qing; China
72 kg	Kyoko Hamaguchi; Japan	Ochirbatyn Burmaa; Mongolia	Yana Panova; Kyrgyzstan

== Participating nations ==
210 competitors from 18 nations competed.

- China (21)
- Chinese Taipei (15)
- India (19)
- Iran (14)
- Japan (21)
- Jordan (2)
- Kazakhstan (21)
- Kyrgyzstan (12)
- Mongolia (13)
- North Korea (6)
- Philippines (2)
- Qatar (6)
- South Korea (20)
- Syria (5)
- Tajikistan (5)
- Thailand (5)
- Uzbekistan (17)
- Vietnam (6)
