= Jarlis Mosquera =

Colombian freestyle wrestler

Personal information
- Full name: Jarlis Ariel Mosquera
- Nationality: Colombia
- Born: 3 September 1983 (age 43) Palmira, Colombia
- Height: 1.80 m (5 ft 11 in)
- Weight: 84 kg (185 lb)

Sport
- Sport: Wrestling
- Event: Freestyle
- Club: Antioquia League
- Coached by: Carlos Daza
Medal record
Men's freestyle wrestling
Representing Colombia
Central American and Caribbean Games
Silver medal – second place	2010 Mayagüez	84 kg

Jarlis Ariel Mosquera (born 3 September 1983 in Palmira, Valle del Cauca) is a Colombian freestyle wrestler. He represented Colombia at the 2008 Summer Olympics in Beijing, where he qualified for the men's under-84 kg category (light heavyweight division). Mosquera was eliminated in the first preliminary round of the competition, after being defeated by Ukraine's Taras Danko, without receiving a technical score for the entire period.

Mosquera also won the silver medal for the same category at the 2010 Central American and Caribbean Games in Mayagüez, Puerto Rico, losing out to the host nation's Jaime Espinal in the final match.
