= Adnan Rhimi =

Tunisian freestyle wrestler

Personal information
- Full name: Adnan Al-Rhimi
- Nationality: Tunisia
- Born: 9 April 1988 (age 38) Tunis, Tunisia
- Height: 1.85 m (6 ft 1 in)
- Weight: 84 kg (185 lb)

Sport
- Sport: Wrestling
- Event: Freestyle
- Club: BOP Tunis
- Coached by: Nabil Ben Kraiem
Medal record
Men's freestyle wrestling
Representing Tunisia
Pan Arab Games
Gold medal – first place	2011 Doha	84 kg

Adnan Al-Rhimi (Arabic: عدنان الرحيمي; born April 9, 1988) is an amateur Tunisian freestyle wrestler, who played for the men's light heavyweight category. He won a gold medal for his division at the 2011 Pan Arab Games in Doha, Qatar, defeating Egypt's Ahmed Aboumansour.

Rhimi represented Tunisia at the 2008 Summer Olympics in Beijing, where he competed for the men's 84 kg class. He received a bye for the preliminary round of sixteen, before losing out to Armenia's Harutyun Yenokyan, who was able to score fourteen points in two straight periods, leaving Rhimi with a single point.
