= Sandeep Kumar (wrestler) =

Australian wrestler (born 1984)

Personal information
- Nationality: Australia
- Born: 22 March 1984 (age 42) Lakhan Kalan, Punjab, India
- Height: 1.76 m (5 ft 9 1/2 in)
- Weight: 65 kg (143 lb)

Sport
- Sport: Wrestling
- Event: Freestyle
- Club: United Wrestling Club
- Coached by: Kuldip Singh

Sandeep Kumar (born 1 April 1983 in Lakhan Kalan, Punjab, India) is an amateur Indian-born Australian freestyle wrestler, who played for the men's light heavyweight category. Kumar moved to Melbourne, Australia permanently in 2004 to pursue more opportunities in the sport of wrestling, and was officially granted citizenship three years later. He also worked as a taxi driver in order to raise funds for his trip to the 2008 Summer Olympics in Beijing. Kumar is the brother of Anil Kumar, who competed in the same discipline at the 1992 Summer Olympics in Barcelona, Spain.

Kumar represented Australia at the 2008 Summer Olympics in Beijing, where he competed for the men's 84 kg class. He received a bye for the preliminary round of sixteen, before losing out to Tajikistan's Yusup Abdusalomov, who was able to score eight points in two straight periods, leaving Kumar without a single point. Because his opponent advanced further into the final match, Kumar had another shot at the bronze medal by entering the repechage bouts. Unfortunately, he was defeated in the first round by Ukraine's Taras Danko, with a two-set technical score (0–3, 0–6), and a classification point score of 0–3.
