= Harutyun Yenokyan =

Armenian freestyle wrestler

Personal information
- Nationality: Armenia
- Born: 5 July 1985 (age 41) Yerevan, Armenia
- Height: 1.76 m (5 ft 9 1/2 in)
- Weight: 88 kg (194 lb)

Sport
- Sport: Wrestling
- Event: Freestyle
- Club: Urartu (ARM)
- Coached by: Edik Tunyans

Harutyun Yenokyan (Armenian: Հարություն Ենոքյան, born 5 July 1985) is an Armenian Freestyle wrestler.

Yenokyan competed at the 2008 Summer Olympics in the men's freestyle 84 kg division. He qualified by placing third at the Olympic Qualification Tournament in Martigny, Switzerland. He progressed to the quarterfinal round of the competition, where he lost to Georgia's Revaz Mindorashvili, who was able to score four points at the end of the second period. Because Mindorashvili advanced further into the final match against Tajikistan's Yusup Abdusalomov, Yenokyan was given another chance at a bronze medal through a repechage bout, in which he lost to Germany's Davyd Bichinashvili, with a technical score of 3–4 and a classification score of 1–3.
