= Lawrence Langowski =

Personal information
- Full name: Lawrence Langowski Mendoza
- Nationality: Mexico
- Born: June 11, 1985 (age 41) Chicago, Illinois, United States
- Height: 1.85 m (6 ft 1 in)
- Weight: 120 kg (265 lb)

Sport
- Sport: Wrestling
- Event: Freestyle
- Club: Wildcat Wrestling Club (USA)

Lawrence Langowski Mendoza (born June 11, 1985) is a former Olympic wrestler from Chicago. Langowski competed at the 2008 Summer Olympics for Mexico in freestyle wrestling at 120 kg.

== Biography ==
Langowski was born and raised in Chicago, Illinois. His father is Polish-American and his mother is from Mexico City. Lawrence attended Gordon Tech High School, where he graduated second in his class and earned varsity letters in football, wrestling, and track and field. While studying at Gordon Tech, Langowski received numerous academic honors and athletic awards, including wrestling achievements at the state and national levels. Larry received a B.A. in Psychology from Northwestern University.

== Wrestling career ==
After graduating from Gordon Tech High School, Langowski attended Northwestern University in Evanston, where he signed onto the wrestling team as a recruited walk-on. Larry wrestled at the Division I (NCAA) level from 2003 to 2006 and earned Academic All Big-Ten Conference and Dean's List Honors. While at Northwestern he suffered a potentially career-ending injury but recovered to compete at elite levels of international competition.

In 2004 Lawrence was invited by the Mexican Olympic Committee to participate in international wrestling competition. He competed in the 2007 Pan American Games in Rio and is a 3X FILA Senior World Team Member. Langowski competed in the 120 kg freestyle division at the 2008 Summer Olympics in Beijing, after earning qualification at the 2008 FILA Pan American Wrestling Championships in Colorado Springs. He was the Mexico's sole representation in wrestling at the Olympics. He also became the first Mexican wrestler to compete at the Olympics since the 1996 Summer Olympics in Atlanta and one of three athletes to represent Mexico in freestyle wrestling at the Olympic level. Langowski lost to Iran's Fardin Masoumi, a World Silver and bronze medalist.

== Post-Olympics ==
After the Olympics, Langowski volunteered for Chicago's 2016 Olympic bid as an athlete ambassador and liaison to the Hispanic community. After Chicago 2016 dissolved he worked with World Sport Chicago, Chicago 2016's legacy organization, to impact inner-city at-risk youth in the Chicago Public Schools system through sport.

In 2010, the U.S. State Department selected Lawrence to the Fulbright Program, a prestigious international fellowship. Langowski moved to Mexico City to serve as a fellow at Endeavor, a non-profit focused on developing entrepreneurship in emerging economies, and to study business at the Instituto Tecnológico Autónomo de México (ITAM).
