= Wang Ying (wrestler) =

Chinese wrestler (born 1983)

Medal record

Men's freestyle wrestling

Representing China

Asian Championships
Gold medal – first place	2008 Jeju City	84 kg

Wang Ying (born 15 August 1983) is a male Chinese freestyle wrestler who will compete at the 2008 Summer Olympics.

His personal best was coming in first at the 2008 Asian Championships.
