= Xu Li (wrestler) =

Chinese freestyle wrestler

Medal record

Women's freestyle wrestling

Representing China

Olympic Games
Silver medal – second place	2008 Beijing	55 kg

Xu Li (simplified Chinese: 许莉; traditional Chinese: 許莉; pinyin: Xǔ Lì; born December 17, 1989, in Suzhou, Anhui) is a female Chinese freestyle wrestler who competed at the 2008 Summer Olympics and received the silver medal in the 55 kg weight class.

She also placed first at the 2007 Women's Wrestling World Cup.
