= Georgy Ketoev =

Russian-Armenian wrestler (born 1985)

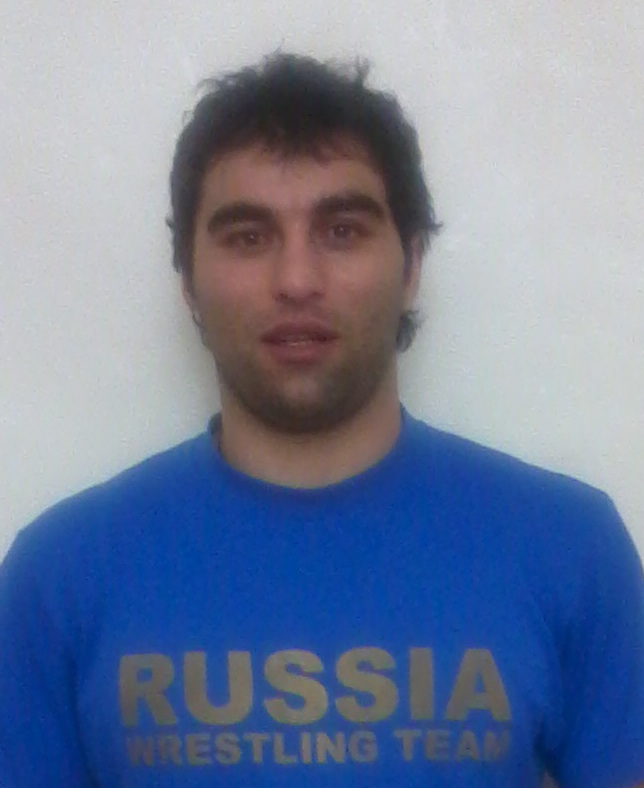
- Ketoev in 2012

Medal record

Men's freestyle wrestling

Representing Armenia

World Championships
Bronze medal – third place	2017 Paris	97 kg

Representing Russia

Olympic Games
Bronze medal – third place	2008 Beijing	84 kg

World Championships
Gold medal – first place	2007 Baku	84 kg

European Championships
Gold medal – first place	2008 Tampere	84 kg
Silver medal – second place	2009 Vilnius	96 kg

Georgy Vazhayevich Ketoyev (Russian: Георгий Важаевич Кетоев; Iron Ossetic: Четиты Важайы фырт Геуæрги, romanized: Četity Važajy fyrt Gewærgi; born 19 November 1985) is a Russian-born Armenian freestyle wrestler. He won a bronze medal at the 2008 Summer Olympics, beaten by Revaz Mindorashvili of Georgia whom Ketoev had previously beaten.

The Russian took the gold medal at the World Championship in Baku (2007) in the 84 kg category, by defeating Jousop Abdusalomov of Tajikistan. It was Ketoev's first time as a world teamer. He won the spot on the Russian team over past World Champions Sazhid Sazhidov and Adam Saitiev. Ketoev won the Junior World Championship in 2005 and had only one finish below first in world-level competition, which was a second-place finish in 2005 at the World Cup.

Ketoev took the silver medal at the European Championship in Vilnius (2009) in the 96 kg weight class, losing to Khetag Gazyumov from Azerbaijan in the finals.
