= Chagnaadorjiin Ganzorig =

Mongolian freestyle wrestler

Personal information
- Nationality: Mongolia
- Born: 24 April 1982 (age 44) Bulgan sum, Arkhangai aimag, Mongolia
- Height: 1.82 m (5 ft 11 1/2 in)
- Weight: 84 kg (185 lb)

Sport
- Sport: Wrestling
- Event: Freestyle
- Club: Khuch Wrestling Club
- Coached by: Zeveg Duvchin
Medal record
Men's freestyle wrestling
Representing Mongolia
Asian Championships
Gold medal – first place	2006 Almaty	84 kg
Silver medal – second place	2007 Bishkek	84 kg
Silver medal – second place	2008 Jeju City	84 kg

Chagnaadorjiin Ganzorig (Mongolian: Чагнаадоржийн Ганзориг; born April 24, 1982, in Bulgan sum, Arkhangai aimag) is an amateur Mongolian freestyle wrestler, who played for the men's light heavyweight category. Between 2006 and 2008, Ganzorig had won a total of three medals (one gold and two silver) for the 84 kg class at the Asian Wrestling Championships.

Ganzorig represented Mongolia at the 2008 Summer Olympics in Beijing, where he competed for the men's 84 kg class. He lost the qualifying round match to Azerbaijan's Novruz Temrezov, with a three-set technical score (0–3, 1–0, 0–3), and a classification point score of 1–3.
