= Davyd Bichinashvili =

German wrestler

Personal information
- Nationality: Ukraine; Germany
- Born: 3 February 1975 (age 51) Tbilisi, Georgian SSR, Soviet Union
- Height: 1.78 m (5 ft 10 in)
- Weight: 84 kg (185 lb)

Sport
- Sport: Wrestling
- Event: Freestyle
- Club: ASV Mainz 88
- Coached by: Waldemar Galwas
Medal record
Men's freestyle wrestling
European Championships
Representing Ukraine
Silver medal – second place	1998 Bratislava	85 kg
Silver medal – second place	2001 Budapest	85 kg
Bronze medal – third place	1997 Warsaw	85 kg
Representing Germany
Bronze medal – third place	2008 Tampere	84 kg

Davyd Bichinashvili (Georgian: დავით ბიჩინაშვილი; born 3 February 1975 in Tbilisi, Georgian SSR, Soviet Union) is an amateur Georgian-born German freestyle wrestler, who played for the men's light heavyweight category. He is a three-time Olympian, and a four-time medalist for his division at the European Wrestling Championships (1997, 1998, 2001, and 2008).

== Wrestling career ==
Since he left Georgia in 1994, Bichinashvili had won a total of three medals (two silver and one bronze) for the men's light heavyweight division at the European Wrestling Championships (1997 in Warsaw, Poland, 1998 in Bratislava, Slovakia, and 2001 in Budapest, Hungary), representing his first adopted nation Ukraine. Bichinashvili made his official debut for the 2000 Summer Olympics in Sydney, where he placed second in the three-person preliminary pool of the men's 85 kg class, against Macedonia's Mogamed Ibragimov, and Japan's Tatsuo Kawai.

Shortly after the Olympics, Bichinashvili moved to his another adopted nation Germany, where he applied and obtained a dual citizenship in order to compete internationally for wrestling. At the 2004 Summer Olympics in Athens, Bichinashvili competed for the men's 84 kg class, as a member of the German wrestling team, after winning his division from the Olympic Qualification Tournament in Sofia, Bulgaria. He had exactly finished the same position as his previous Olympics in the preliminary pool round, against Cuba's Yoel Romero and Guam's Jeffrey Cobb, attaining a total score of 10 technical and 4 classification points.

Eight years after competing in his first Olympics, Bichinashvili qualified for his third time in men's 84 kg class, as a 33-year-old, at the 2008 Summer Olympics in Beijing, by placing seventh from the 2007 World Wrestling Championships in Baku, Azerbaijan. He received a bye for the preliminary round of sixteen match, before losing out to Georgia's Revaz Mindorashvili, with a three-set technical score (1–4, 2–0, 3–1), and a classification score of 1–3. Because his opponent advanced further into the final match, Bichinashvili took advantage of the repechage rounds by defeating Armenia's Harutyun Yenokyan, after the pair had scored 4–3. He progressed to the bronze medal match, but narrowly lost the medal to Russia's Georgy Ketoev, with a three-set technical score (0–3, 2–0, 2–2), and a classification point score of 1–3.
