= Zaurbek Sokhiev =

Uzbekistani wrestler

Medal record

Men's Freestyle wrestling

Representing Uzbekistan

World Championships
Gold medal – first place	2009 Herning	84 kg
Silver medal – second place	2010 Moscow	84 kg
Bronze medal – third place	2006 Guangzhou	84 kg
Bronze medal – third place	2007 Baku	84 kg

Asian Games
Silver medal – second place	2006 Doha	84 kg

Asian Championships
Silver medal – second place	2006 Almaty	84 kg

Zaurbek Sokhiev (Russian: Заурбе́к Маирбе́кович Со́хиев, Iron Ossetic: Сохиты Мӕирбеджы фырт Зауырбег, born 1 June 1986 in Tajik SSR, Soviet Union) is a Russian-Ossetian male freestyle wrestler, who represented Uzbekistan, a freestyle wrestling world champion (2009), a participant in the Summer Olympic Games in Beijing (2008) and London (2012). Master of sports of international class in freestyle wrestling.
