= Radosław Horbik =

Polish wrestler

Radosław Horbik (born 29 March 1977 in Wrocław) is a former Polish Freestyle wrestler who competed in the 2008 Summer Olympics in Beijing.

At the 2008 Summer Olympics he finished 16th in the light-heavyweight competition (84 kg) in wrestling.
