= Novruz Temrezov =

Azerbaijani freestyle wrestler

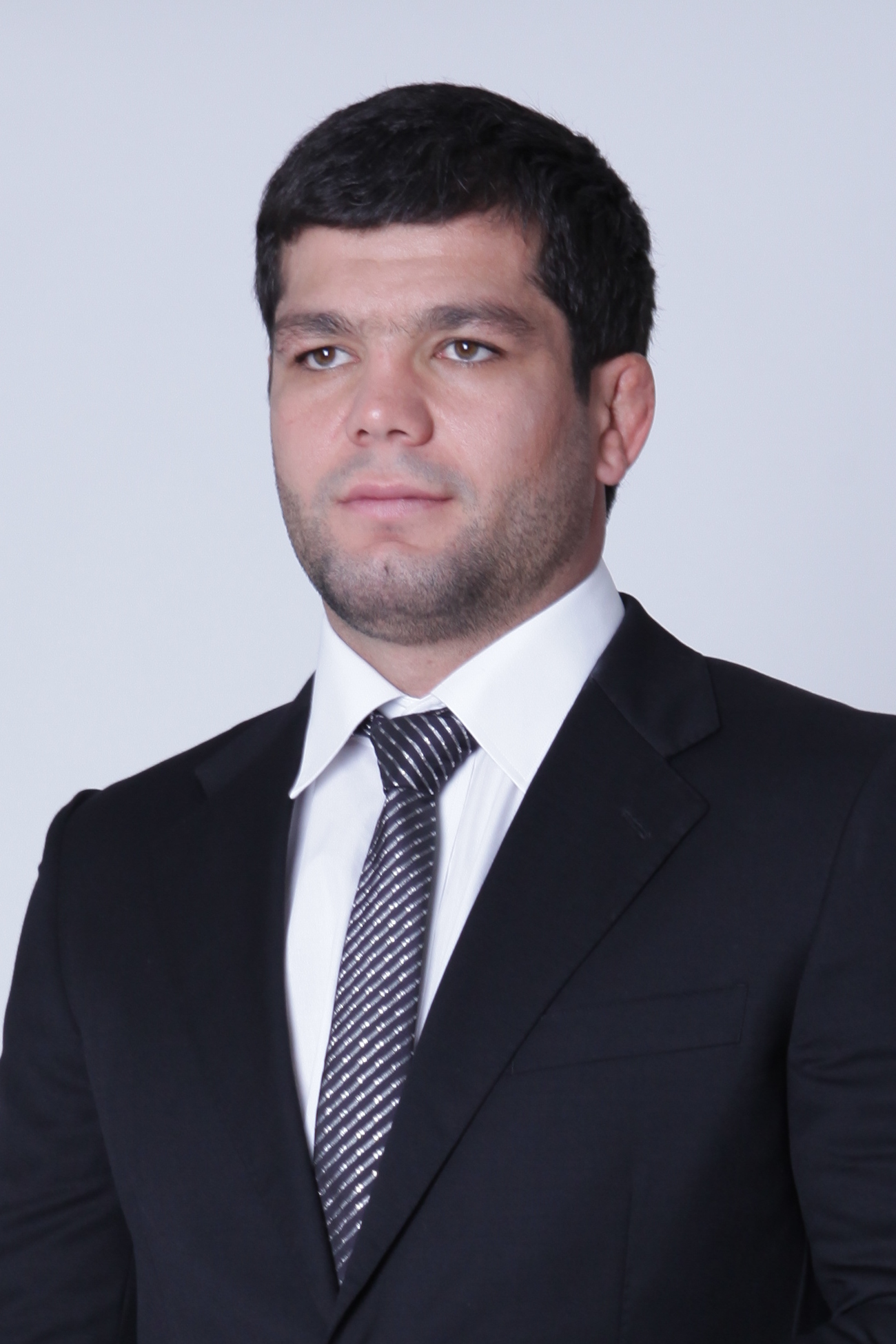
- Novruz Temrezov in 2012.

Personal information
- Born: 6 January 1981 (age 45) Karachayevsk, Russia
- Height: 173 cm (5 ft 8 in)
- Weight: 84 kg (185 lb)

Sport
- Sport: Freestyle wrestling
Medal record
European championships
Representing Russia
| Bronze medal – third place | 2005 Varna | -84 kg |
Representing Azerbaijan
| Bronze medal – third place | 2008 Tampere | -84 kg |
| Bronze medal – third place | 2009 Vilnius | -84 kg |

Novruz Srapilevich Temrezov (born 6 January 1981) is a male freestyle wrestler. Until 2006 he competed for Russia and after that for Azerbaijan. He won bronze medals at the European championships in 2005, 2008 and 2009 and placed seventh at the 2008 Summer Olympics. His brothers Kurman and Tokhtar are also international wrestlers.
