= Travis Cross =

Canadian freestyle wrestler

Personal information
- Nationality: Canada
- Born: 1 December 1980 (age 45) Nanaimo, British Columbia, Canada
- Height: 2.00 m (6 ft 6 1/2 in)
- Weight: 84 kg (185 lb)

Sport
- Sport: Wrestling
- Event: Freestyle
- College team: Douglas College
- Club: Burnaby Mountain Wrestling
- Coached by: Dave McKay; Justin Abdou

Travis Cross (born December 1, 1980) is an amateur Canadian freestyle wrestler, who played for the men's light heavyweight category. He qualified for the 84 kg class in men's freestyle wrestling at the 2008 Summer Olympics in Beijing by finishing eighth from the 2007 World Wrestling Championships in Baku, Azerbaijan. He is also a three-time Canadian national wrestling champion.

== Wrestling career ==
Cross grew up in Port Alberni, British Columbia, and started his wrestling career as a seventh grade student at Mount Klitsa Junior High School. He became a two-time high school state wrestling champion, while attending Alberni District Secondary School, and eventually continued his sporting career as a varsity team member at Simon Fraser University. After completing his college diploma, he enrolled in the Justice Institute's Firefighting program to follow his ultimate career goal of firefighting.

While pursuing his education, Cross continued his wrestling career by participating in numerous tournaments. He had won two silver medals and claimed three back-to-back titles for his weight division from the national championships. Cross also reached into an international level, when he first competed as a member of national wrestling team at the World Junior Championships in Paris. In 2005, Cross finished twelfth at his first World Championships in Budapest, Hungary, and achieved an eight-place finish two years later, in Baku, Azerbaijan, where he received an automatic qualifying berth for the 2008 Summer Olympics in Beijing. Cross was also a full-time member at the Burnaby Mountain Wrestling Club in Burnaby, British Columbia, where he had been training for two years with his partner Ivan Diaconu, a seven-time national champion from Moldova, who competed at the 2000 Summer Olympics in Sydney.

At the 2008 Summer Olympics, Cross competed for the men's light heavyweight class in freestyle wrestling. He lost the second preliminary round match to Turkey's Serhat Balcı, who was able to score the final point first for each period based on the international wrestling rules.

Cross currently works as a firefighter at the local department, and also, resides in Port Alberni, British Columbia, with his wife and former high school sweetheart Melissa, and son Nicholas.
