= Revaz Mindorashvili =

Georgian wrestler (born 1976)

Medal record

Men's freestyle wrestling

Representing Georgia

Olympic Games
Gold medal – first place	2008 Beijing	84 kg

World Championships
Gold medal – first place	2005 Budapest	84 kg
Silver medal – second place	2006 Guangzhou	84 kg
Bronze medal – third place	2003 New York City	84 kg

European Championship
Gold medal – first place	2003 Riga	84 kg
Silver medal – second place	2004 Ankara	84 kg
Silver medal – second place	2008 Tampere	84 kg
Bronze medal – third place	2002 Baku	84 kg

Revaz Mindorashvili (Georgian: რევაზ მინდორაშვილი, born 1 July 1976) is a Georgian wrestler, who won a gold medal at the 2008 Summer Olympics.
