= Taras Danko =

Ukrainian wrestler (born 1980)

Medal record

Men's freestyle wrestling

Representing Ukraine

Olympic Games
Bronze medal – third place	2008 Beijing	84 kg

World Championships
Bronze medal – third place	2005 Budapest	84 kg

European Championships
Gold medal – first place	Varna 2005	84 kg
Bronze medal – third place	Moscow 2006	84 kg
Silver medal – second place	Sophia 2007	84 kg

Taras Hryhoriyovych Danko (Тарас Григорійович Данько; born July 3, 1980, in Kiev, in the Ukrainian SSR of the Soviet Union) is a Ukrainian wrestler, who has won a bronze medal at the 2008 Summer Olympics.
