= Yusup Abdusalomov =

Russian and Tajik wrestler (born 1977)

Abdusalamov Yusup Rashidovich Абдусаламов Юсуп Рашидович
Personal information
- Nationality: Russian
- Born: November 8, 1977 (age 48) Makhachkala, Dagestan, Russian SFSR, Soviet Union
- Height: 1.73 m (5 ft 8 in)
- Weight: 84 kg (185 lb)

Sport
- Country: Russia; Tajikistan
- Sport: Wrestling
- Event: Freestyle
- Coached by: Labazan Abdulaev, Magomed Dibirov, Anvar Magomedgadzhiev,
Medal record
Men's freestyle wrestling
Representing Tajikistan
Olympic Games
Silver medal – second place	2008 Beijing	84 kg
World Championships
Silver medal – second place	2007 Baku	84 kg
Asian Games
Silver medal – second place	2002 Busan	74 kg
Asian Championships
Gold medal – first place	2003 New Delhi	84 kg
Bronze medal – third place	2008 Jeju City	84 kg
- Updated on 23 July 2012

Yusup Rashidovich Abdusalamov (Russian: Юсуп Рашидович Абдусаламов; born November 8, 1977; Dagestan) is a USSR-born Russian and Tajik wrestler, who won a silver medal, at the 2008 Summer Olympics.

== Career ==
Having won the freestyle wrestling title in his weight category at the 2003 Asian championship, Abdusalomov made his Olympic debut at the 2004 Summer Olympics in Athens, where he finished 9th place overall in the men's freestyle 74kg category. He followed this the following year with a relatively disappointing 13th place in the 2005 FILA Wrestling World Championships in Budapest. Abdusalamov was to improve on this at the 2007 World Championships in Baku where he claimed second place, having moved up to the 84 kg weight category. At the next Olympics in 2008 Beijing, he repeated his good form from the world championships to claim the silver medal in the 84kg category. In the 2012 Summer Olympics, however, he was unable to achieve a medal after having lost to Gadzhimurad Nurmagomedov of Armenia.
