= 2003 World Wrestling Championships – Men's Greco-Roman 96 kg =

Men's Greco-Roman 96 kg at the 2003 World Championships
- Venue: Palais des Sports Robert Oubron
- Dates: 3–5 October 2003
- Competitors: 43 from 43 nations

Medalists
gold medal	Martin Lidberg	Sweden
silver medal	Karam Gaber	Egypt
bronze medal	Ramaz Nozadze	Georgia

The men's Greco-Roman 96 kilograms is a competition featured at the 2003 World Wrestling Championships, and was held at the Palais des Sports Robert Oubron in Créteil, France from 3 to 5 October 2003.

== Results ==
=== Preliminary round ===
==== Pool 1 ====
Pos	Athlete	Pld	W	L	CP	TP	EGY	BUL	JPN
1	Karam Gaber (EGY)	2	2	0	7	22	—	5–0	17–5
2	Ali Mollov (BUL)	2	1	1	3	3	0–3 PO	—	3–0
3	Kenzo Kato (JPN)	2	0	2	1	5	1–4 SP	0–3 PO	—

Source: Official website

==== Pool 2 ====
Pos	Athlete	Pld	W	L	CP	TP	TUR	ARM	ISR
1	Mehmet Özal (TUR)	2	2	0	7	8	—	5–2	3–0 Fall
2	Arman Geghamyan (ARM)	2	1	1	4	5	1–3 PP	—	3–2
3	Henri Papiashvili (ISR)	2	0	2	1	2	0–4 TO	1–3 PP	—

Source: Official website

==== Pool 3 ====
Pos	Athlete	Pld	W	L	CP	TP	RUS	LAT	TJK
1	Aleksandr Bezruchkin (RUS)	2	2	0	7	9	—	4–0	5–0 Fall
2	Igors Kostins (LAT)	2	1	1	4	11	0–3 PO	—	11–0
3	Alisher Ashurov (TJK)	2	0	2	0	0	0–4 TO	0–4 ST	—

Source: Official website

==== Pool 4 ====
Pos	Athlete	Pld	W	L	CP	TP	POL	USA	CHN
1	Marek Sitnik (POL)	2	2	0	8	21	—	11–0	10–0
2	Justin Ruiz (USA)	2	1	1	3	4	0–4 ST	—	4–2
3	Jiang Huachen (CHN)	2	0	2	1	2	0–4 ST	1–3 PP	—

Source: Official website

==== Pool 5 ====
Pos	Athlete	Pld	W	L	CP	TP	UZB	FRA	PLW
1	Aleksey Cheglakov (UZB)	2	2	0	7	12	—	2–1	10–0
2	Cédric Theval (FRA)	2	1	1	5	13	1–3 PP	—	12–2
3	John Tarkong (PLW)	2	0	2	1	2	0–4 ST	1–4 SP	—

Source: Official website

==== Pool 6 ====
Pos	Athlete	Pld	W	L	CP	TP	HUN	CUB	EST
1	Lajos Virág (HUN)	2	2	0	6	10	—	5–2	5–1
2	Ernesto Peña (CUB)	2	1	1	4	6	1–3 PP	—	4–0
3	Toomas Proovel (EST)	2	0	2	1	1	1–3 PP	0–3 PO	—

Source: Official website

==== Pool 7 ====
Pos	Athlete	Pld	W	L	CP	TP	GEO	KOR	ESP
1	Ramaz Nozadze (GEO)	2	2	0	8	23	—	11–0	12–0
2	Han Tae-young (KOR)	2	1	1	3	5	0–4 ST	—	5–1
3	Waldo Moreno (ESP)	2	0	2	1	1	0–4 ST	1–3 PP	—

Source: Official website

==== Pool 8 ====
Pos	Athlete	Pld	W	L	CP	TP	ROM	NED	TPE
1	Petru Sudureac (ROM)	2	2	0	8	26	—	13–0	13–0
2	Sabe Hussein (NED)	2	1	1	4	8	0–4 ST	—	8–0 Fall
3	Wang Chun-yuan (TPE)	2	0	2	0	0	0–4 ST	0–4 TO	—

Source: Official website

==== Pool 9 ====
Pos	Athlete	Pld	W	L	CP	TP	SWE	BLR	MDA
1	Martin Lidberg (SWE)	2	2	0	6	9	—	6–0	3–0
2	Andrei Batura (BLR)	2	1	1	3	4	0–3 PO	—	4–3
3	Igor Grabovetchi (MDA)	2	0	2	1	3	0–3 PO	1–3 PP	—

Source: Official website

==== Pool 10 ====
Pos	Athlete	Pld	W	L	CP	TP	GER	CZE	SVK
1	Mirko Englich (GER)	2	2	0	6	4	—	1–1	3–0
2	Marek Švec (CZE)	2	1	1	4	7	1–3 PP	—	6–0
3	Roman Meduna (SVK)	2	0	2	0	0	0–3 PO	0–3 PO	—

Source: Official website

==== Pool 11 ====
Pos	Athlete	Pld	W	L	CP	TP	LTU	SCG	IND
1	Mindaugas Ežerskis (LTU)	2	2	0	7	16	—	6–5	10–0
2	Saša Dukai (SCG)	2	1	1	4	9	1–3 PP	—	4–0
3	Anil Kumar (IND)	2	0	2	0	0	0–4 ST	0–3 PO	—

Source: Official website

==== Pool 12 ====
Pos	Athlete	Pld	W	L	CP	TP	KGZ	AUT	GBR
1	Gennady Chkhaidze (KGZ)	2	2	0	7	15	—	5–0	10–0
2	Martin Schlagenhaufen (AUT)	2	1	1	4	0	0–3 PO	—	WO
3	Joe Lewis (GBR)	2	0	2	0	0	0–4 ST	0–4 PA	—

Source: Official website

==== Pool 13 ====
Pos	Athlete	Pld	W	L	CP	TP	GRE	IRQ	ALB
1	Konstantinos Thanos (GRE)	2	2	0	6	14	—	5–1	9–0
2	Ali Nadhim (IRQ)	2	1	1	4	8	1–3 PP	—	7–1
3	Elis Guri (ALB)	2	0	2	1	1	0–3 PO	1–3 PP	—

Source: Official website

==== Pool 14 ====
Pos	Athlete	Pld	W	L	CP	TP	UKR	IRI	KAZ	SUI
1	Davyd Saldadze (UKR)	3	3	0	9	9	—	2–1	3–0	4–0
2	Masoud Hashemzadeh (IRI)	3	2	1	8	5	1–3 PP	—	4–0	WO
3	Margulan Assembekov (KAZ)	3	1	2	3	5	0–3 PO	0–3 PO	—	5–2
4	Urs Bürgler (SUI)	3	0	3	1	2	0–3 PO	0–4 PA	1–3 PP	—

Source: Official website

=== Knockout round ===
Round of 16
Karam Gaber (EGY)	8
Mehmet Özal (TUR)	0
Aleksandr Bezruchkin (RUS)	9
Marek Sitnik (POL)	7
Aleksey Cheglakov (UZB)	13
Lajos Virág (HUN)	11
Ramaz Nozadze (GEO)	13
Petru Sudureac (ROM)	1
Martin Lidberg (SWE)	11
Mirko Englich (GER)	8
Mindaugas Ežerskis (LTU)	2
Gennady Chkhaidze (KGZ)	3

Quarterfinals
Karam Gaber (EGY)	5
Aleksandr Bezruchkin (RUS)	2
Aleksey Cheglakov (UZB)	5
Ramaz Nozadze (GEO)	6
Martin Lidberg (SWE)	3
Gennady Chkhaidze (KGZ)	0
Konstantinos Thanos (GRE)	0
Davyd Saldadze (UKR)	4

Semifinals
Karam Gaber (EGY)	10
Ramaz Nozadze (GEO)	0
Martin Lidberg (SWE)	3
Davyd Saldadze (UKR)	1

Final
Karam Gaber (EGY)	0
Martin Lidberg (SWE)	3
Bronze medal match
Ramaz Nozadze (GEO)	6
Davyd Saldadze (UKR)	0
