= 1999 World Wrestling Championships – Men's Greco-Roman 97 kg =

Men's Greco-Roman 97 kg at the 1999 World Championships
- Venue: Peace and Friendship Stadium
- Dates: 23–25 September 1999
- Competitors: 33 from 33 nations

Medalists
gold medal	Gogi Koguashvili	Russia
silver medal	Andrzej Wroński	Poland
bronze medal	Mikael Ljungberg	Sweden

The men's Greco-Roman 97 kilograms is a competition featured at the 1999 World Wrestling Championships, and was held at the Peace and Friendship Stadium in Piraeus, Athens, Greece from 23 to 25 September 1999.

== Results ==
Legend

- F — Won by fall

=== Preliminary round ===
==== Pool 1 ====
Pos	Athlete	Pld	W	L	CP	TP	CZE	BLR	MDA
1	Marek Švec (CZE)	2	2	0	6	6	—	3–1	3–0
2	Sergey Lishtvan (BLR)	2	1	1	4	4	1–3 PP	—	3–0
3	Igor Grabovetchi (MDA)	2	0	2	0	0	0–3 PO	0–3 PO	—

Source: Official website

==== Pool 2 ====
Pos	Athlete	Pld	W	L	CP	TP	CRO	ISR	IRI
1	Josip Pavišić (CRO)	2	2	0	6	2	—	1–1	1–0
2	Henri Papiashvili (ISR)	2	1	1	5	1	1–3 PP	—	WO
3	Rasoul Jazini (IRI)	2	0	2	0	0	0–3 PO	0–4 PA	—

Source: Official website

==== Pool 3 ====
Pos	Athlete	Pld	W	L	CP	TP	UKR	GEO	VEN
1	Davyd Saldadze (UKR)	2	2	0	7	15	—	7–4	8–1 Fall
2	Gennady Chkhaidze (GEO)	2	1	1	5	14	1–3 PP	—	10–7 Fall
3	Álvaro Torres (VEN)	2	0	2	0	8	0–4 TO	0–4 TO	—

Source: Official website

==== Pool 4 ====
Pos	Athlete	Pld	W	L	CP	TP	TUR	ROM	KOR
1	Hakkı Başar (TUR)	2	2	0	6	19	—	12–8	7–2
2	Petru Sudureac (ROM)	2	1	1	4	14	1–3 PP	—	6–1
3	Park Woo (KOR)	2	0	2	2	3	1–3 PP	1–3 PP	—

Source: Official website

==== Pool 5 ====
Pos	Athlete	Pld	W	L	CP	TP	RUS	ARM	BUL
1	Gogi Koguashvili (RUS)	2	2	0	6	6	—	4–0	2–0
2	Khoren Papoyan (ARM)	2	1	1	4	6	0–3 PO	—	6–0 Fall
3	Ali Mollov (BUL)	2	0	2	0	0	0–3 PO	0–4 TO	—

Source: Official website

==== Pool 6 ====
Pos	Athlete	Pld	W	L	CP	TP	CUB	GER	LTU
1	Reynaldo Peña (CUB)	2	2	0	6	14	—	11–10	3–2
2	Maik Bullmann (GER)	2	1	1	4	16	1–3 PP	—	6–4
3	Mindaugas Ežerskis (LTU)	2	0	2	2	6	1–3 PP	1–3 PP	—

Source: Official website

==== Pool 7 ====
Pos	Athlete	Pld	W	L	CP	TP	USA	GRE	EST
1	Jason Klohs (USA)	2	2	0	6	5	—	2–1	3–1
2	Konstantinos Thanos (GRE)	2	1	1	4	7	1–3 PP	—	6–2
3	Vello Pärnpuu (EST)	2	0	2	2	3	1–3 PP	1–3 PP	—

Source: Official website

==== Pool 8 ====
Pos	Athlete	Pld	W	L	CP	TP	KAZ	HUN	ITA
1	Sergey Matviyenko (KAZ)	2	2	0	6	5	—	1–0	4–0
2	János Tóth (HUN)	2	1	1	3	5	0–3 PO	—	5–4
3	Salvatore Campanella (ITA)	2	0	2	1	4	0–3 PO	1–3 PP	—

Source: Official website

==== Pool 9 ====
Pos	Athlete	Pld	W	L	CP	TP	YUG	POL	CHN
1	Pajo Ivošević (YUG)	2	2	0	6	12	—	3–1	9–2
2	Andrzej Wroński (POL)	2	1	1	5	11	1–3 PP	—	10–1 Fall
3	Feng Fuming (CHN)	2	0	2	1	5	1–3 PP	0–4 TO	—

Source: Official website

==== Pool 10 ====
Pos	Athlete	Pld	W	L	CP	TP	SWE	TKM	SYR
1	Mikael Ljungberg (SWE)	2	2	0	8	14	—	10–0	4–0 Fall
2	Rozy Rejepow (TKM)	2	1	1	3	4	0–4 ST	—	4–0
3	Mohammad Al-Haiek (SYR)	2	0	2	0	0	0–4 TO	0–3 PO	—

Source: Official website

==== Pool 11 ====
Pos	Athlete	Pld	W	L	CP	TP	SUI	SVK	JPN
1	Urs Bürgler (SUI)	2	2	0	6	9	—	5–0	4–0
2	Roman Meduna (SVK)	2	1	1	3	3	0–3 PO	—	3–0
3	Koji Yamaguchi (JPN)	2	0	2	0	0	0–3 PO	0–3 PO	—

Source: Official website

=== Knockout round ===
Round of 16
Marek Švec (CZE)	4
Josip Pavišić (CRO)	0
Davyd Saldadze (UKR)	0
Hakkı Başar (TUR)	5
Gogi Koguashvili (RUS)	4
Reynaldo Peña (CUB)	1
Jason Klohs (USA)	2
Sergey Matviyenko (KAZ)	0
Pajo Ivošević (YUG)	1
Mikael Ljungberg (SWE)	4
Urs Bürgler (SUI)	2^{F}
Henri Papiashvili (ISR)	0
Gennady Chkhaidze (GEO)	2
Khoren Papoyan (ARM)	1
Maik Bullmann (GER)	1
Andrzej Wroński (POL)	2

Quarterfinals
Marek Švec (CZE)	0
Hakkı Başar (TUR)	4^{F}
Gogi Koguashvili (RUS)	5
Jason Klohs (USA)	0
Mikael Ljungberg (SWE)	9^{F}
Urs Bürgler (SUI)	0
Gennady Chkhaidze (GEO)	1
Andrzej Wroński (POL)	4

Semifinals
Hakkı Başar (TUR)	2
Gogi Koguashvili (RUS)	4
Mikael Ljungberg (SWE)	1
Andrzej Wroński (POL)	4

Final
Gogi Koguashvili (RUS)	4
Andrzej Wroński (POL)	0
Bronze medal match
Hakkı Başar (TUR)	2
Mikael Ljungberg (SWE)	4
