= 2001 World Wrestling Championships – Men's Greco-Roman 97 kg =

Men's Greco-Roman 97 kg at the 2001 World Championships
- Venue: Dimitris Tofalos Arena
- Dates: 6–8 December 2001
- Competitors: 31 from 31 nations

Medalists
gold medal	Aleksandr Bezruchkin	Russia
silver medal	Ernesto Peña	Cuba
bronze medal	Mehmet Özal	Turkey

The men's Greco-Roman 97 kilograms is a competition featured at the 2001 World Wrestling Championships, and was held at the Dimitris Tofalos Arena in Patras, Greece from 6 to 8 December 2001.

== Results ==
Legend

- F — Won by fall

=== Preliminary round ===
==== Pool 1 ====
Pos	Athlete	Pld	W	L	CP	TP	UZB	UKR	GRE
1	Aleksey Cheglakov (UZB)	2	2	0	6	10	—	4–2	6–0
2	Davyd Saldadze (UKR)	2	1	1	4	6	1–3 PP	—	4–3
3	Georgios Koutsioumpas (GRE)	2	0	2	1	3	0–3 PO	1–3 PP	—

Source: Japan Wrestling

==== Pool 2 ====
Pos	Athlete	Pld	W	L	CP	TP	SVK	ARM	ISR
1	Roman Meduna (SVK)	2	2	0	7	6	—	2–1 Fall	4–0
2	Robert Petrosyan (ARM)	2	1	1	3	4	0–4 TO	—	3–0
3	Henri Papiashvili (ISR)	2	0	2	0	0	0–3 PO	0–3 PO	—

Source: Japan Wrestling

==== Pool 3 ====
Pos	Athlete	Pld	W	L	CP	TP	KAZ	EST	AUS
1	Sergey Matviyenko (KAZ)	2	2	0	7	15	—	3–1	12–0
2	Vello Pärnpuu (EST)	2	1	1	5	13	1–3 PP	—	12–0
3	Reza Rostami (AUS)	2	0	2	0	0	0–4 ST	0–4 ST	—

Source: Japan Wrestling

==== Pool 4 ====
Pos	Athlete	Pld	W	L	CP	TP	RUS	FRA	JPN
1	Aleksandr Bezruchkin (RUS)	2	2	0	7	15	—	4–0	11–0
2	Cédric Theval (FRA)	2	1	1	3	4	0–3 PO	—	4–2
3	Yusuke Morikaku (JPN)	2	0	2	1	2	0–4 ST	1–3 PP	—

Source: Japan Wrestling

==== Pool 5 ====
Pos	Athlete	Pld	W	L	CP	TP	ROM	SUI	USA
1	Petru Sudureac (ROM)	2	2	0	6	13	—	7–0	6–0
2	Urs Bürgler (SUI)	2	1	1	4	10	0–3 PO	—	10–0
3	Jason Loukides (USA)	2	0	2	0	0	0–3 PO	0–4 ST	—

Source: Japan Wrestling

==== Pool 6 ====
Pos	Athlete	Pld	W	L	CP	TP	CZE	EGY	LTU
1	Marek Švec (CZE)	2	2	0	6	10	—	6–0	4–1
2	Karam Gaber (EGY)	2	1	1	4	13	0–3 PO	—	13–3
3	Mindaugas Ežerskis (LTU)	2	0	2	2	4	1–3 PP	1–4 SP	—

Source: Japan Wrestling

==== Pool 7 ====
Pos	Athlete	Pld	W	L	CP	TP	POL	GEO	GER
1	Marek Sitnik (POL)	2	2	0	6	10	—	4–1	6–2
2	Gennady Chkhaidze (GEO)	2	1	1	4	8	1–3 PP	—	7–0
3	Mirko Englich (GER)	2	0	2	1	2	1–3 PP	0–3 PO	—

Source: Japan Wrestling

==== Pool 8 ====
Pos	Athlete	Pld	W	L	CP	TP	TUR	BLR	KOR
1	Mehmet Özal (TUR)	2	2	0	6	12	—	5–2	7–0
2	Sergey Lishtvan (BLR)	2	1	1	4	6	1–3 PP	—	4–2
3	Park Woo (KOR)	2	0	2	1	2	0–3 PO	1–3 PP	—

Source: Japan Wrestling

==== Pool 9 ====
Pos	Athlete	Pld	W	L	CP	TP	IRI	SWE	FIN
1	Ehsan Karimfar (IRI)	2	2	0	6	7	—	3–0	4–0
2	Jimmy Lidberg (SWE)	2	1	1	3	4	0–3 PO	—	4–0
3	Jari Kortesmäki (FIN)	2	0	2	0	0	0–3 PO	0–3 PO	—

Source: Japan Wrestling

==== Pool 10 ====
Pos	Athlete	Pld	W	L	CP	TP	CUB	BUL	HUN	IND
1	Ernesto Peña (CUB)	3	3	0	10	11	—	7–0	4–1	WO
2	Ali Mollov (BUL)	3	2	1	7	10	0–3 PO	—	3–0	7–1 Fall
3	Béla Kaló (HUN)	3	1	2	5	1	1–3 PP	0–3 PO	—	WO
4	Satish Kumar (IND)	3	0	3	0	1	0–4 PA	0–4 TO	0–4 EF	—

Source: Japan Wrestling

=== Knockout round ===
Round of 16
Aleksey Cheglakov (UZB)	5
Roman Meduna (SVK)	2
Sergey Matviyenko (KAZ)	0
Aleksandr Bezruchkin (RUS)	4

Quarterfinals
Aleksey Cheglakov (UZB)	1
Aleksandr Bezruchkin (RUS)	2
Petru Sudureac (ROM)	3
Marek Švec (CZE)	2
Marek Sitnik (POL)	0
Mehmet Özal (TUR)	2^{F}
Ehsan Karimfar (IRI)	0
Ernesto Peña (CUB)	6

Semifinals
Aleksandr Bezruchkin (RUS)	4
Petru Sudureac (ROM)	1
Mehmet Özal (TUR)	1
Ernesto Peña (CUB)	11

Final
Aleksandr Bezruchkin (RUS)	7
Ernesto Peña (CUB)	0
Bronze medal match
Petru Sudureac (ROM)	5
Mehmet Özal (TUR)	7
