= 1998 World Wrestling Championships – Men's Greco-Roman 97 kg =

Men's Greco-Roman 97 kg at the 1998 World Championships
- Venue: Gavlerinken
- Dates: 27–29 August 1998
- Competitors: 26 from 26 nations

Medalists
gold medal	Gogi Koguashvili	Russia
silver medal	Marek Švec	Czech Republic
bronze medal	Davyd Saldadze	Ukraine

The men's Greco-Roman 97 kilograms is a competition featured at the 1998 World Wrestling Championships, and was held at the Gavlerinken in Gävle, Sweden from 27 to 29 August 1998.

== Results ==
=== Round 1 ===
	Score	
Round of 32
Hassan Torabi (DEN)	0–11 Fall	Hakkı Başar (TUR)
Mikael Ljungberg (SWE)	1–0	Andrzej Wroński (POL)
Park Woo (KOR)	0–1	Roman Meduna (SVK)
Zhang Yuankai (CHN)	0–13 Fall	Maik Bullmann (GER)
Ali Mollov (BUL)	4–0	Colbie Bell (CAN)
János Tóth (HUN)	3–0	Mohammad Sharabiani (IRI)
Mindaugas Ežerskis (LTU)	4–2	Konstantinos Thanos (GRE)
Gogi Koguashvili (RUS)	2–0	Sergey Lishtvan (BLR)
Davyd Saldadze (UKR)	9–0	Vello Pärnpuu (EST)
Petru Sudureac (ROM)	11–0	Hassene Fkiri (TUN)
Jason Klohs (USA)	0–4 Fall	Gennady Chkhaidze (GEO)
Pajo Ivošević (YUG)	0–1	Marek Švec (CZE)
Giuseppe Giunta (ITA)	5–0	Toshinori Iwabuchi (JPN)

=== Round 2 ===
	Score	
Round of 16
Hakkı Başar (TUR)	1–1	Mikael Ljungberg (SWE)
Roman Meduna (SVK)	3–6	Maik Bullmann (GER)
Ali Mollov (BUL)	1–0	János Tóth (HUN)
Mindaugas Ežerskis (LTU)	0–6	Gogi Koguashvili (RUS)
Davyd Saldadze (UKR)	1–4	Petru Sudureac (ROM)
Gennady Chkhaidze (GEO)	0–3	Marek Švec (CZE)
Giuseppe Giunta (ITA)		Bye
Repechage
Hassan Torabi (DEN)	0–10	Andrzej Wroński (POL)
Park Woo (KOR)	2–1	Zhang Yuankai (CHN)
Colbie Bell (CAN)	0–5	Mohammad Sharabiani (IRI)
Konstantinos Thanos (GRE)	6–5	Sergey Lishtvan (BLR)
Vello Pärnpuu (EST)	3–1	Hassene Fkiri (TUN)
Jason Klohs (USA)	3–1	Pajo Ivošević (YUG)
Toshinori Iwabuchi (JPN)		Bye

=== Round 3 ===
	Score	
Quarterfinals
Giuseppe Giunta (ITA)	0–12	Mikael Ljungberg (SWE)
Maik Bullmann (GER)	0–2 Ret	Ali Mollov (BUL)
Gogi Koguashvili (RUS)	6–0	Petru Sudureac (ROM)
Marek Švec (CZE)		Bye
Repechage
Toshinori Iwabuchi (JPN)	0–10	Andrzej Wroński (POL)
Park Woo (KOR)	0–1	Mohammad Sharabiani (IRI)
Konstantinos Thanos (GRE)	6–1	Vello Pärnpuu (EST)
Jason Klohs (USA)	0–3	Hakkı Başar (TUR)
Roman Meduna (SVK)	0–3	János Tóth (HUN)
Mindaugas Ežerskis (LTU)	0–3	Davyd Saldadze (UKR)
Gennady Chkhaidze (GEO)		Bye

=== Round 4 ===
	Score	
Repechage
Gennady Chkhaidze (GEO)	0–5	Andrzej Wroński (POL)
Mohammad Sharabiani (IRI)	3–2 Fall	Konstantinos Thanos (GRE)
Hakkı Başar (TUR)	3–0	János Tóth (HUN)
Davyd Saldadze (UKR)	3–0	Giuseppe Giunta (ITA)
Petru Sudureac (ROM)		Bye

=== Round 5 ===
	Score	
Semifinals
Marek Švec (CZE)	7–1	Mikael Ljungberg (SWE)
Ali Mollov (BUL)	1–3	Gogi Koguashvili (RUS)
Repechage
Petru Sudureac (ROM)	3–0	Andrzej Wroński (POL)
Mohammad Sharabiani (IRI)	0–1	Hakkı Başar (TUR)
Davyd Saldadze (UKR)		Bye

=== Round 6 ===
	Score	
Repechage
Davyd Saldadze (UKR)	3–0	Hakkı Başar (TUR)
Petru Sudureac (ROM)		Bye

=== Round 7 ===
	Score	
Repechage
Petru Sudureac (ROM)	2–2	Ali Mollov (BUL)
Davyd Saldadze (UKR)		Bye

=== Finals ===
	Score	
Bronze medal match
Petru Sudureac (ROM)	0–4	Davyd Saldadze (UKR)
Final
Marek Švec (CZE)	0–3	Gogi Koguashvili (RUS)
