= 2002 World Wrestling Championships – Men's Greco-Roman 96 kg =

Men's Greco-Roman 96 kg at the 2002 World Championships
- Venue: Universal Sports Hall CSKA
- Dates: 21–22 September 2002
- Competitors: 28 from 28 nations

Medalists
gold medal	Mehmet Özal	Turkey
silver medal	Karam Gaber	Egypt
bronze medal	Ali Mollov	Bulgaria

The men's Greco-Roman 96 kilograms is a competition featured at the 2002 World Wrestling Championships, and was held at the Universal Sports Hall CSKA in Moscow, Russia from 21 to 22 September 2002.

== Results ==
=== Preliminary round ===
==== Pool 1 ====
Pos	Athlete	Pld	W	L	CP	TP	YUG	ARM	FRA
1	Saša Dukai (YUG)	2	2	0	6	9	—	6–0	3–2
2	Robert Petrosyan (ARM)	2	1	1	3	3	0–3 PO	—	3–0
3	Cédric Theval (FRA)	2	0	2	1	2	1–3 PP	0–3 PO	—

Source: Official website

==== Pool 2 ====
Pos	Athlete	Pld	W	L	CP	TP	CZE	UKR	ROM
1	Marek Švec (CZE)	2	2	0	6	10	—	4–1	6–1
2	Davyd Saldadze (UKR)	2	1	1	4	6	1–3 PP	—	5–1
3	Petru Sudureac (ROM)	2	0	2	2	2	1–3 PP	1–3 PP	—

Source: Official website

==== Pool 3 ====
Pos	Athlete	Pld	W	L	CP	TP	EGY	POL	SWE
1	Karam Gaber (EGY)	2	2	0	7	15	—	10–0	5–0
2	Marek Sitnik (POL)	2	1	1	3	7	0–4 ST	—	7–0
3	Martin Lidberg (SWE)	2	0	2	0	0	0–3 PO	0–3 PO	—

Source: Official website

==== Pool 4 ====
Pos	Athlete	Pld	W	L	CP	TP	BUL	RUS	USA
1	Ali Mollov (BUL)	2	2	0	6	8	—	5–3	3–0
2	Aleksandr Bezruchkin (RUS)	2	1	1	4	10	1–3 PP	—	7–0
3	Garrett Lowney (USA)	2	0	2	0	0	0–3 PO	0–3 PO	—

Source: Official website

==== Pool 5 ====
Pos	Athlete	Pld	W	L	CP	TP	GER	LTU	BLR
1	Mirko Englich (GER)	2	2	0	7	2	—	2–1	WO
2	Mindaugas Ežerskis (LTU)	2	1	1	5	1	1–3 PP	—	0–0 Ret
3	Sergey Lishtvan (BLR)	2	0	2	0	0	0–4 EF	0–4 PA	—

Source: Official website

==== Pool 6 ====
Pos	Athlete	Pld	W	L	CP	TP	CUB	KOR	KGZ
1	Ernesto Peña (CUB)	2	2	0	7	18	—	8–1	10–0
2	Han Tae-young (KOR)	2	1	1	5	10	1–3 PP	—	9–0 Fall
3	Dmitry Filipovskiy (KGZ)	2	0	2	0	0	0–4 ST	0–4 TO	—

Source: Official website

==== Pool 7 ====
Pos	Athlete	Pld	W	L	CP	TP	SVK	HUN	LAT
1	Roman Meduna (SVK)	2	2	0	6	7	—	4–0	3–0
2	Béla Kaló (HUN)	2	1	1	3	10	0–3 PO	—	10–1
3	Igors Kostins (LAT)	2	0	2	1	1	0–3 PO	1–3 PP	—

Source: Official website

==== Pool 8 ====
Pos	Athlete	Pld	W	L	CP	TP	TUR	GRE	GEO
1	Mehmet Özal (TUR)	2	2	0	6	6	—	3–1	3–1
2	Georgios Koutsioumpas (GRE)	2	1	1	5	4	1–3 PP	—	4–0 Fall
3	Ramaz Nozadze (GEO)	2	0	2	1	1	1–3 PP	0–4 TO	—

Source: Official website

==== Pool 9 ====
Pos	Athlete	Pld	W	L	CP	TP	UZB	CHN	EST	JPN
1	Aleksey Cheglakov (UZB)	3	3	0	10	18	—	5–0	3–0	10–0
2	Liu Hao (CHN)	3	2	1	6	10	0–3 PO	—	4–1	6–0
3	Richard Karelson (EST)	3	1	2	5	11	0–3 PO	1–3 PP	—	10–0
4	Yusuke Morikaku (JPN)	3	0	3	0	0	0–4 ST	0–3 PO	0–4 ST	—

Source: Official website

=== Knockout round ===
Round of 16
Saša Dukai (YUG)	2
Marek Švec (CZE)	7

Quarterfinals
Marek Švec (CZE)	0
Karam Gaber (EGY)	10
Ali Mollov (BUL)	3
Mirko Englich (GER)	0
Ernesto Peña (CUB)	7
Roman Meduna (SVK)	3
Mehmet Özal (TUR)	6
Aleksey Cheglakov (UZB)	1

Semifinals
Karam Gaber (EGY)	8
Ali Mollov (BUL)	1
Ernesto Peña (CUB)	4
Mehmet Özal (TUR)	6

Final
Karam Gaber (EGY)	11
Mehmet Özal (TUR)	15
Bronze medal match
Ali Mollov (BUL)	4
Ernesto Peña (CUB)	0
