= 2007 World Wrestling Championships – Men's Greco-Roman 96 kg =

Men's Greco-Roman 96 kg at the 2007 World Championships
- Venue: Heydar Aliyev Sports and Concert Complex
- Dates: 18 September 2007
- Competitors: 43 from 43 nations

Medalists
gold medal	Ramaz Nozadze	Georgia
silver medal	Mindaugas Ežerskis	Lithuania
bronze medal	Ghasem Rezaei	Iran
bronze medal	Marek Švec	Czech Republic

The men's Greco-Roman 96 kilograms is a competition featured at the 2007 World Wrestling Championships, and was held at the Heydar Aliyev Sports and Concert Complex in Baku, Azerbaijan on 18 September 2007.

== Results ==
Legend

- F — Won by fall

=== Finals ===
Semifinals				Final
Kenzo Kato (JPN)	2	1	0
Mindaugas Ežerskis (LTU)	1	1	2	Mindaugas Ežerskis (LTU)	5	1	3
Daigoro Timoncini (ITA)	0	0		Ramaz Nozadze (GEO)	0	3	3
Ramaz Nozadze (GEO)	6	2

=== Top half ===
==== Section 1 ====
Round of 64

Round of 32
Deni Lipić (CRO)	4	0	0
Yosvani Lima (CUB)	2	6	3
Zaur Nuriyev (MDA)	4	2
Bronislav Sharovetsky (ISR)	0	0
Roman Meduna (SVK)	5	6
Jarlis Mosquera (COL)	0	0
Kenzo Kato (JPN)	4^{F}
Jiang Huachen (CHN)	0

Round of 16
Yosvani Lima (CUB)	3	1	3
Zaur Nuriyev (MDA)	0	1	0
Roman Meduna (SVK)	3	2	1
Kenzo Kato (JPN)	1	3	2

Quarterfinals
Yosvani Lima (CUB)	0	0
Kenzo Kato (JPN)	6	4^{F}

==== Section 2 ====
Round of 64

Round of 32
Mirko Englich (GER)	3	1	1
Balázs Kiss (HUN)	1	2	3
Ivan Popov (AUS)	0	0
Ghasem Rezaei (IRI)	5	2
Azamat Erkimbaev (KGZ)	0	0
Mindaugas Ežerskis (LTU)	2	5
Rami Hietaniemi (FIN)	0	6	1
Igors Kostins (LAT)	5	0	1

Round of 16
Balázs Kiss (HUN)	1	1	1
Ghasem Rezaei (IRI)	1	3	2
Mindaugas Ežerskis (LTU)	2	1	1
Rami Hietaniemi (FIN)	1	2	1

Quarterfinals
Ghasem Rezaei (IRI)	1	1
Mindaugas Ežerskis (LTU)	1	1

=== Bottom half ===
==== Section 3 ====
Round of 64
Waldo Moreno (ESP)	1	0
Serkan Özden (TUR)	2	4^{F}
Dimitriy Timchenko (UKR)	2	1	3
Andrei Batura (BLR)	3	1	0
Asset Mambetov (KAZ)	1	0	3
Heiki Nabi (EST)	1	3	1

Round of 32
Georgios Koutsioumpas (GRE)	0	3
Arman Geghamyan (ARM)	5	3
Daigoro Timoncini (ITA)	1	3
Gennady Chkhaidze (UZB)	1	0
Fritz Aanes (NOR)	0
Serkan Özden (TUR)	3^{F}
Dimitriy Timchenko (UKR)	1	0
Asset Mambetov (KAZ)	2	4

Round of 16
Arman Geghamyan (ARM)	2	0	1
Daigoro Timoncini (ITA)	1	5	1
Serkan Özden (TUR)	0	0
Asset Mambetov (KAZ)	2	6

Quarterfinals
Daigoro Timoncini (ITA)	0	6	1
Asset Mambetov (KAZ)	2	0	1

==== Section 4 ====
Round of 64
Ramaz Nozadze (GEO)	4	2
Marek Švec (CZE)	0	2
John Tarkong (PLW)	0	0
Justin Ruiz (USA)	7	7
Kaloyan Dinchev (BUL)	7	7
Randhir Singh (IND)	0	0
Jimmy Lidberg (SWE)	1	2
Han Tae-young (KOR)	1	0
Samir Bouguerra (ALG)	1	1
Mitja Sedmak (SLO)	2	3
Elis Guri (ALB)	5	4
Vladimir Radosavljević (MNE)	0	0
Hassine Ayari (TUN)	0	0
Ali Nadhim (IRQ)	4	4
Vasily Teploukhov (RUS)	3	2
Andrzej Deberny (POL)	0	1

Round of 32
Ramaz Nozadze (GEO)	1	3
Justin Ruiz (USA)	1	0
Kaloyan Dinchev (BUL)	1	1	0
Jimmy Lidberg (SWE)	1	1	3
Mitja Sedmak (SLO)	0	0
Elis Guri (ALB)	3	5^{F}
Ali Nadhim (IRQ)	0	0
Vasily Teploukhov (RUS)	4	3

Round of 16
Ramaz Nozadze (GEO)	2	1	2
Jimmy Lidberg (SWE)	0	1	0
Elis Guri (ALB)	4	3
Vasily Teploukhov (RUS)	2	0

Quarterfinals
Ramaz Nozadze (GEO)	3	3
Elis Guri (ALB)	1	2

=== Repechage ===
Repechage round 1
Marek Švec (CZE)	5	2
Justin Ruiz (USA)	0	1

Repechage round 2
Azamat Erkimbaev (KGZ)	0	1
Rami Hietaniemi (FIN)	3	1
Marek Švec (CZE)	2	3
Jimmy Lidberg (SWE)	2	0

Repechage round 3
Rami Hietaniemi (FIN)	1	0
Ghasem Rezaei (IRI)	1	2
Marek Švec (CZE)	4	6
Elis Guri (ALB)	0	0

Bronze medals
Ghasem Rezaei (IRI)	2	4
Kenzo Kato (JPN)	0	0
Marek Švec (CZE)	3	1
Daigoro Timoncini (ITA)	0	1
