= 1997 World Wrestling Championships – Men's Greco-Roman 97 kg =

Men's Greco-Roman 97 kg at the 1997 World Championships
- Venue: Hala Ludowa
- Dates: 10–12 September 1997
- Competitors: 24 from 24 nations

Medalists
| gold medal | Gogi Koguashvili | Russia |
| silver medal | Anatoly Fedorenko | Belarus |
| bronze medal | Andrzej Wroński | Poland |

The men's Greco-Roman 97 kilograms is a competition featured at the 1997 World Wrestling Championships, and was held in Wrocław, Poland from 10 to 12 September 1997.

== Results ==
Legend

- WO — Won by walkover

=== Round 1 ===
| | Score | |
Round of 32
| Olivier Welzer (FRA) | 0–12 | Vyacheslav Oliynyk (UKR) |
| Josip Pavišić (CRO) | 1–0 | Lee Yong-duk (KOR) |
| Hakkı Başar (TUR) | 9–0 Fall | Petru Sudureac (ROM) |
| Andrzej Wroński (POL) | 4–1 | Béla Kaló (HUN) |
| Ali Mollov (BUL) | 4–1 | Randy Couture (USA) |
| Igor Grabovetchi (MDA) | 3–0 Ret | Bakur Gogitidze (GEO) |
| Robert Mazouch (JPN) | 0–10 | Pajo Ivošević (YUG) |
| Gogi Koguashvili (RUS) | 3–0 | Giuseppe Giunta (ITA) |
| Emilio Suárez (VEN) | 0–3 Fall | Anatoly Fedorenko (BLR) |
| Konstantinos Thanos (GRE) | 3–0 | Vello Pärnpuu (EST) |
| Khoren Papoyan (ARM) | 5–3 | Mikael Ljungberg (SWE) |
| Maik Bullmann (GER) | 7–0 | Marek Švec (CZE) |

=== Round 2 ===
| | Score | |
Round of 16
| Vyacheslav Oliynyk (UKR) | 3–0 | Josip Pavišić (CRO) |
| Hakkı Başar (TUR) | 0–0 | Andrzej Wroński (POL) |
| Ali Mollov (BUL) | 0–1 | Igor Grabovetchi (MDA) |
| Pajo Ivošević (YUG) | 0–5 | Gogi Koguashvili (RUS) |
| Anatoly Fedorenko (BLR) | 3–0 | Konstantinos Thanos (GRE) |
| Khoren Papoyan (ARM) | 0–8 | Maik Bullmann (GER) |
Repechage
| Olivier Welzer (FRA) | 4–0 | Lee Yong-duk (KOR) |
| Petru Sudureac (ROM) | 5–3 | Béla Kaló (HUN) |
| Randy Couture (USA) | WO | Bakur Gogitidze (GEO) |
| Robert Mazouch (JPN) | 5–10 | Giuseppe Giunta (ITA) |
| Emilio Suárez (VEN) | 0–8 Fall | Vello Pärnpuu (EST) |
| Mikael Ljungberg (SWE) | 10–0 | Marek Švec (CZE) |

=== Round 3 ===
| | Score | |
Quarterfinals
| Vyacheslav Oliynyk (UKR) | 0–3 | Andrzej Wroński (POL) |
| Igor Grabovetchi (MDA) | 0–3 | Gogi Koguashvili (RUS) |
| Anatoly Fedorenko (BLR) | | Bye |
| Maik Bullmann (GER) | | Bye |
Repechage
| Olivier Welzer (FRA) | 0–5 | Petru Sudureac (ROM) |
| Randy Couture (USA) | 3–3 Fall | Giuseppe Giunta (ITA) |
| Vello Pärnpuu (EST) | 0–5 | Mikael Ljungberg (SWE) |
| Josip Pavišić (CRO) | 0–4 Fall | Hakkı Başar (TUR) |
| Ali Mollov (BUL) | 0–4 | Pajo Ivošević (YUG) |
| Konstantinos Thanos (GRE) | 4–0 | Khoren Papoyan (ARM) |

=== Round 4 ===
| | Score | |
Semifinals
| Andrzej Wroński (POL) | 1–3 | Gogi Koguashvili (RUS) |
| Anatoly Fedorenko (BLR) | 2–2 | Maik Bullmann (GER) |
Repechage
| Petru Sudureac (ROM) | 2–1 | Randy Couture (USA) |
| Mikael Ljungberg (SWE) | 1–0 | Hakkı Başar (TUR) |
| Pajo Ivošević (YUG) | 2–1 | Konstantinos Thanos (GRE) |
| Vyacheslav Oliynyk (UKR) | 5–0 | Igor Grabovetchi (MDA) |

=== Round 5 ===
| | Score | |
Repechage
| Petru Sudureac (ROM) | 1–3 | Mikael Ljungberg (SWE) |
| Pajo Ivošević (YUG) | 0–6 | Vyacheslav Oliynyk (UKR) |

=== Round 6 ===
| | Score | |
Repechage
| Andrzej Wroński (POL) | 4–2 | Mikael Ljungberg (SWE) |
| Vyacheslav Oliynyk (UKR) | 1–4 | Maik Bullmann (GER) |

=== Finals ===
| | Score | |
5th place match
| Mikael Ljungberg (SWE) | 5–0 | Vyacheslav Oliynyk (UKR) |
Bronze medal match
| Andrzej Wroński (POL) | 2–0 | Maik Bullmann (GER) |
Final
| Gogi Koguashvili (RUS) | 6–0 | Anatoly Fedorenko (BLR) |
