= Wrestling at the 2004 Summer Olympics – Men's Greco-Roman 96 kg =

Men's Greco-Roman 96 kg at the Games of the XXVIII Olympiad
- Venue: Ano Liosia Olympic Hall
- Date: 25–26 August 2004
- Competitors: 22 from 22 nations

Medalists
1st place, gold medalist(s)		Karam Gaber	Egypt
2nd place, silver medalist(s)		Ramaz Nozadze	Georgia
3rd place, bronze medalist(s)		Mehmet Özal	Turkey

The men's Greco-Roman 96 kilograms at the 2004 Summer Olympics as part of the wrestling program were held at the Ano Liosia Olympic Hall, August 25 to August 26.

The competition held with an elimination system of three or four wrestlers in each pool, with the winners qualify for the quarterfinals, semifinals and final by way of direct elimination.

== Schedule ==
All times are Eastern European Summer Time (UTC+03:00)

Date	Time	Event
25 August 2004	09:30	Round 1
25 August 2004	09:30	Round 2
25 August 2004	17:30	Round 3
26 August 2004	09:30	Qualification
26 August 2004	09:30	Semifinals
26 August 2004	17:30	Finals

== Results ==
Legend

- D — Disqualified
- WO — Won by walkover

=== Elimination pools ===
==== Pool 1 ====
Pos	Athlete	Pld	W	L	CP	TP	Qualification
1	Gogi Koguashvili (RUS)	2	2	0	6	8	Knockout round
2	Sergey Lishtvan (BLR)	2	1	1	4	0	
3	Martin Lidberg (SWE)	2	0	2	1	1	

Source: Official website

	Score		CP
Gogi Koguashvili (RUS)	3–1	Martin Lidberg (SWE)	3–1 PP
Sergey Lishtvan (BLR)	0–5	Gogi Koguashvili (RUS)	0–3 PO
Martin Lidberg (SWE)	WO	Sergey Lishtvan (BLR)	0–4 PA

==== Pool 2 ====
Pos	Athlete	Pld	W	L	CP	TP	Qualification
1	Ramaz Nozadze (GEO)	2	2	0	6	6	Knockout round
2	Mirko Englich (GER)	2	1	1	4	4	
3	Davyd Saldadze (UKR)	2	0	2	2	2	

Source: Official website

	Score		CP
Ramaz Nozadze (GEO)	3–1	Mirko Englich (GER)	3–1 PP
Davyd Saldadze (UKR)	1–3	Ramaz Nozadze (GEO)	1–3 PP
Mirko Englich (GER)	3–1	Davyd Saldadze (UKR)	3–1 PP

==== Pool 3 ====
Pos	Athlete	Pld	W	L	CP	TP	Qualification
1	Gennady Chkhaidze (KGZ)	2	2	0	7	15	Knockout round
2	Kaloyan Dinchev (BUL)	2	1	1	5	13	
3	John Tarkong (PLW)	2	0	2	0	0	

Source: Official website

	Score		CP
John Tarkong (PLW)	0–10	Gennady Chkhaidze (KGZ)	0–4 ST
Kaloyan Dinchev (BUL)	11–0	John Tarkong (PLW)	4–0 ST
Gennady Chkhaidze (KGZ)	5–2	Kaloyan Dinchev (BUL)	3–1 PP

==== Pool 4 ====
Pos	Athlete	Pld	W	L	CP	TP	Qualification
1	Masoud Hashemzadeh (IRI)	2	2	0	7	7	Knockout round
2	Mindaugas Ežerskis (LTU)	2	1	1	3	6	
3	Petru Sudureac (ROM)	2	0	2	2	3	

Source: Official website

	Score		CP
Petru Sudureac (ROM)	2–2	Masoud Hashemzadeh (IRI)	1–3 PP
Mindaugas Ežerskis (LTU)	3–1	Petru Sudureac (ROM)	3–1 PP
Masoud Hashemzadeh (IRI)	5–3 Fall	Mindaugas Ežerskis (LTU)	4–0 TO

==== Pool 5 ====
Pos	Athlete	Pld	W	L	CP	TP	Qualification
1	Mehmet Özal (TUR)	2	2	0	6	8	Knockout round
2	Aleksey Cheglakov (UZB)	2	1	1	3	3	
3	Igors Kostins (LAT)	2	0	2	1	2	

Source: Official website

	Score		CP
Aleksey Cheglakov (UZB)	3–2	Igors Kostins (LAT)	3–1 PP
Mehmet Özal (TUR)	3–0	Aleksey Cheglakov (UZB)	3–0 PO
Igors Kostins (LAT)	0–5	Mehmet Özal (TUR)	0–3 PO

==== Pool 6 ====
Pos	Athlete	Pld	W	L	CP	TP	Qualification
1	Ernesto Peña (CUB)	2	2	0	6	8	Knockout round
2	Lajos Virág (HUN)	2	1	1	4	5	
3	Garrett Lowney (USA)	2	0	2	1	1	

Source: Official website

	Score		CP
Garrett Lowney (USA)	1–3	Ernesto Peña (CUB)	1–3 PP
Lajos Virág (HUN)	4–0	Garrett Lowney (USA)	3–0 PO
Ernesto Peña (CUB)	5–1	Lajos Virág (HUN)	3–1 PP

==== Pool 7 ====
Pos	Athlete	Pld	W	L	CP	TP	Qualification
1	Karam Gaber (EGY)	3	3	0	10	20	Knockout round
2	Georgios Koutsioumpas (GRE)	3	2	1	7	13	
3	Marek Sitnik (POL)	3	1	2	4	5	
4	Asset Mambetov (KAZ)	3	0	3	0	0	

Source: Official website

	Score		CP
Georgios Koutsioumpas (GRE)	4–0	Asset Mambetov (KAZ)	3–0 PO
Karam Gaber (EGY)	6–0	Marek Sitnik (POL)	3–0 PO
Georgios Koutsioumpas (GRE)	6–11	Karam Gaber (EGY)	1–3 PP
Asset Mambetov (KAZ)	0–3	Marek Sitnik (POL)	0–3 PO
Georgios Koutsioumpas (GRE)	3–2	Marek Sitnik (POL)	3–1 PP
Asset Mambetov (KAZ)	0–3 Fall	Karam Gaber (EGY)	0–4 TO

=== Knockout round ===
Qualification
Gogi Koguashvili (RUS)	0
Ramaz Nozadze (GEO)	3
Gennady Chkhaidze (KGZ)	1
Masoud Hashemzadeh (IRI)	3
Mehmet Özal (TUR)	4
Ernesto Peña (CUB)	1

Semifinals
Ramaz Nozadze (GEO)	4
Masoud Hashemzadeh (IRI)	2
Mehmet Özal (TUR)	0
Karam Gaber (EGY)	11

Gold medal match
Ramaz Nozadze (GEO)	1
Karam Gaber (EGY)	12
Bronze medal match
Masoud Hashemzadeh (IRI)	2^{D}
Mehmet Özal (TUR)	3

Classification 5–6
Gennady Chkhaidze (KGZ)	0
Ernesto Peña (CUB)	4

== Final standing ==
Rank	Athlete
1st place, gold medalist(s)	Karam Gaber (EGY)
2nd place, silver medalist(s)	Ramaz Nozadze (GEO)
3rd place, bronze medalist(s)	Mehmet Özal (TUR)
4	Ernesto Peña (CUB)
5	Gennady Chkhaidze (KGZ)
6	Gogi Koguashvili (RUS)
7	Georgios Koutsioumpas (GRE)
8	Kaloyan Dinchev (BUL)
9	Lajos Virág (HUN)
10	Marek Sitnik (POL)
11	Mirko Englich (GER)
12	Sergey Lishtvan (BLR)
13	Mindaugas Ežerskis (LTU)
14	Aleksey Cheglakov (UZB)
15	Petru Sudureac (ROM)
16	Davyd Saldadze (UKR)
17	Igors Kostins (LAT)
18	Martin Lidberg (SWE)
19	Garrett Lowney (USA)
20	John Tarkong (PLW)
21	Asset Mambetov (KAZ)
DQ	Masoud Hashemzadeh (IRI)

- Masoud Hashemzadeh was disqualified for unsportsmanlike conduct following his protest after the bronze medal match.
