= Wrestling at the 2000 Summer Olympics – Men's Greco-Roman 97 kg =

Men's Greco-Roman 97 kg at the Games of the XXVII Olympiad
- Venue: Sydney Convention and Exhibition Centre
- Date: 24–26 September 2000
- Competitors: 20 from 20 nations

Medalists
1st place, gold medalist(s)		Mikael Ljungberg	Sweden
2nd place, silver medalist(s)		Davyd Saldadze	Ukraine
3rd place, bronze medalist(s)		Garrett Lowney	United States

The men's Greco-Roman 97 kilograms at the 2000 Summer Olympics as part of the wrestling program was held at the Sydney Convention and Exhibition Centre from September 24 to 26. The competition held with an elimination system of three or four wrestlers in each pool, with the winners qualify for the quarterfinals, semifinals and final by way of direct elimination.

== Schedule ==
All times are Australian Eastern Daylight Time (UTC+11:00)

Date	Time	Event
24 September 2000	09:30	Round 1
24 September 2000	17:00	Round 2
24 September 2000	17:00	Round 3
25 September 2000	09:30	Quarterfinals
25 September 2000	17:00	Semifinals
26 September 2000	17:00	Finals

== Results ==
=== Elimination pools ===
==== Pool 1 ====
Pos	Athlete	Pld	W	L	CP	TP	Qualification
1	Mikael Ljungberg (SWE)	2	2	0	7	13	Knockout round
2	Petru Sudureac (ROM)	2	1	1	4	8	
3	Ali Mollov (BUL)	2	0	2	1	1	

Source: Official Report

	Score		CP
Petru Sudureac (ROM)	2–3	Mikael Ljungberg (SWE)	1–3 PP
Ali Mollov (BUL)	1–6	Petru Sudureac (ROM)	1–3 PP
Mikael Ljungberg (SWE)	10–0	Ali Mollov (BUL)	4–0 ST

==== Pool 2 ====
Pos	Athlete	Pld	W	L	CP	TP	Qualification
1	Sergey Matviyenko (KAZ)	2	1	1	3	6	Knockout round
2	Rafael Samurgashev (ARM)	2	1	1	3 (Note: Head-to-head result: ARM 3–0 CUB.)	1	
3	Reynaldo Peña (CUB)	2	1	1	3	1	

Source: Official Report
Notes:

	Score		CP
Reynaldo Peña (CUB)	1–0	Sergey Matviyenko (KAZ)	3–0 PO
Rafael Samurgashev (ARM)	1–0	Reynaldo Peña (CUB)	3–0 PO
Sergey Matviyenko (KAZ)	6–0	Rafael Samurgashev (ARM)	3–0 PO

==== Pool 3 ====
Pos	Athlete	Pld	W	L	CP	TP	Qualification
1	Garrett Lowney (USA)	2	2	0	6	10	Knockout round
2	Gogi Koguashvili (RUS)	2	1	1	4	6	
3	Marek Švec (CZE)	2	0	2	1	2	

Source: Official Report

	Score		CP
Garrett Lowney (USA)	2–0	Marek Švec (CZE)	3–0 PO
Gogi Koguashvili (RUS)	3–8	Garrett Lowney (USA)	1–3 PP
Marek Švec (CZE)	2–3	Gogi Koguashvili (RUS)	1–3 PP

==== Pool 4 ====
Pos	Athlete	Pld	W	L	CP	TP	Qualification
1	Gennady Chkhaidze (GEO)	2	2	0	6	6	Knockout round
2	Andrzej Wroński (POL)	2	1	1	3	7	
3	Hakkı Başar (TUR)	2	0	2	2	3	

Source: Official Report

	Score		CP
Gennady Chkhaidze (GEO)	2–0	Andrzej Wroński (POL)	3–0 PO
Hakkı Başar (TUR)	2–4	Gennady Chkhaidze (GEO)	1–3 PP
Andrzej Wroński (POL)	7–1	Hakkı Başar (TUR)	3–1 PP

==== Pool 5 ====
Pos	Athlete	Pld	W	L	CP	TP	Qualification
1	Konstantinos Thanos (GRE)	3	3	0	10	18	Knockout round
2	Urs Bürgler (SUI)	3	2	1	7	12	
3	Park Woo (KOR)	3	1	2	4	11	
4	Ben Vincent (AUS)	3	0	3	0	0	

Source: Official Report

	Score		CP
Konstantinos Thanos (GRE)	3–0	Park Woo (KOR)	3–0 PO
Ben Vincent (AUS)	0–11	Urs Bürgler (SUI)	0–4 ST
Konstantinos Thanos (GRE)	11–0	Ben Vincent (AUS)	4–0 ST
Park Woo (KOR)	0–1	Urs Bürgler (SUI)	0–3 PO
Konstantinos Thanos (GRE)	4–0	Urs Bürgler (SUI)	3–0 PO
Park Woo (KOR)	11–0	Ben Vincent (AUS)	4–0 ST

==== Pool 6 ====
Pos	Athlete	Pld	W	L	CP	TP	Qualification
1	Davyd Saldadze (UKR)	3	3	0	9	16	Knockout round
2	Mindaugas Ežerskis (LTU)	3	2	1	6 (Note: Head-to-head result: LTU 3–1 BLR.)	9	
3	Sergey Lishtvan (BLR)	3	1	2	6	13	
4	Hassene Fkiri (TUN)	3	0	3	1	3	

Source: Official Report
Notes:

	Score		CP
Mindaugas Ežerskis (LTU)	3–1	Sergey Lishtvan (BLR)	3–1 PP
Davyd Saldadze (UKR)	9–0	Hassene Fkiri (TUN)	3–0 PO
Mindaugas Ežerskis (LTU)	0–2	Davyd Saldadze (UKR)	0–3 PO
Sergey Lishtvan (BLR)	10–0	Hassene Fkiri (TUN)	4–0 ST
Mindaugas Ežerskis (LTU)	6–3	Hassene Fkiri (TUN)	3–1 PP
Sergey Lishtvan (BLR)	2–5	Davyd Saldadze (UKR)	1–3 PP

=== Knockout round ===
Quarterfinals
Mikael Ljungberg (SWE)	5
Sergey Matviyenko (KAZ)	0
Garrett Lowney (USA)	2
Gennady Chkhaidze (GEO)	0

Semifinals
Mikael Ljungberg (SWE)	8
Garrett Lowney (USA)	1
Konstantinos Thanos (GRE)	2
Davyd Saldadze (UKR)	4

Gold medal match
Mikael Ljungberg (SWE)	2
Davyd Saldadze (UKR)	1
Bronze medal match
Garrett Lowney (USA)	3
Konstantinos Thanos (GRE)	1

Classification 5th–6th
Sergey Matviyenko (KAZ)	1
Gennady Chkhaidze (GEO)	1

== Final standing ==
Rank	Athlete
1st place, gold medalist(s)	Mikael Ljungberg (SWE)
2nd place, silver medalist(s)	Davyd Saldadze (UKR)
3rd place, bronze medalist(s)	Garrett Lowney (USA)
4	Konstantinos Thanos (GRE)
5	Gennady Chkhaidze (GEO)
6	Sergey Matviyenko (KAZ)
7	Urs Bürgler (SUI)
8	Mindaugas Ežerskis (LTU)
9	Sergey Lishtvan (BLR)
10	Park Woo (KOR)
11	Petru Sudureac (ROM)
12	Gogi Koguashvili (RUS)
13	Andrzej Wroński (POL)
14	Rafael Samurgashev (ARM)
15	Reynaldo Peña (CUB)
16	Hakkı Başar (TUR)
17	Hassene Fkiri (TUN)
18	Marek Švec (CZE)
19	Ali Mollov (BUL)
20	Ben Vincent (AUS)
