= Wrestling at the 2008 Summer Olympics – Men's Greco-Roman 96 kg =

Men's Greco-Roman 96 kg at the Games of the XXIX Olympiad
- Venue: China Agricultural University Gymnasium
- Date: 14 August 2008
- Competitors: 20 from 20 nations

Medalists
1st place, gold medalist(s)		Aslanbek Khushtov	Russia
2nd place, silver medalist(s)		Mirko Englich	Germany
3rd place, bronze medalist(s)		Adam Wheeler	United States
3rd place, bronze medalist(s)		Marek Švec	Czech Republic

Men's Greco-Roman 96 kilograms competition at the 2008 Summer Olympics in Beijing, China, was held on August 14 at the China Agricultural University Gymnasium.

This Greco-Roman wrestling competition consists of a single-elimination tournament, with a repechage used to determine the winner of two bronze medals. The two finalists face off for gold and silver medals. Each wrestler who loses to one of the two finalists moves into the repechage, culminating in a pair of bronze medal matches featuring the semifinal losers each facing the remaining repechage opponent from their half of the bracket.

Each bout consists of up to three rounds, lasting two minutes apiece. The wrestler who scores more points in each round is the winner of that rounds; the bout ends when one wrestler has won two rounds (and thus the match).

== Schedule ==
All times are China Standard Time (UTC+08:00)

Date	Time	Event
14 August 2008	09:30	Qualification rounds
14 August 2008	16:00	Repechage
14 August 2008	17:00	Finals

== Results ==
Legend

- F — Won by fall

=== Final ===
Final
Mirko Englich (GER)	0	0
Aslanbek Khushtov (RUS)	6	3

=== Top half ===
Qualifications

1/8 finals
Han Tae-young (KOR)	1	2
Mirko Englich (GER)	2	2
Elis Guri (ALB)	2	2	1
Karam Gaber (EGY)	4	1	1
Lajos Virág (HUN)	1	1	1
Adam Wheeler (USA)	1	1	1
Samir Bouguerra (ALG)	0	0
Jiang Huachen (CHN)	5	3

Quarterfinals
Mirko Englich (GER)	1	6	1
Elis Guri (ALB)	1	0	1
Adam Wheeler (USA)	0	4	1
Jiang Huachen (CHN)	7	2	1

Semifinals
Mirko Englich (GER)	2	2
Adam Wheeler (USA)	1	1

=== Bottom half ===
Qualifications
Daigoro Timoncini (ITA)	2	6
Kenzo Kato (JPN)	0	0
Asset Mambetov (KAZ)	0	0
Aslanbek Khushtov (RUS)	5	5
Ghasem Rezaei (IRI)	1	2	1
Mindaugas Ežerskis (LTU)	1	1	1
Oleg Kryoka (UKR)	2	2	1
Mehmet Özal (TUR)	4	1	1

1/8 finals
Ramaz Nozadze (GEO)	1	2
Theodoros Tounousidis (GRE)	1	2
Marek Švec (CZE)	4	1	1
Kaloyan Dinchev (BUL)	1	3	1
Daigoro Timoncini (ITA)	0	0
Aslanbek Khushtov (RUS)	4	4
Mindaugas Ežerskis (LTU)	2	2	3
Mehmet Özal (TUR)	2	1	1

Quarterfinals
Ramaz Nozadze (GEO)	1	1	1
Marek Švec (CZE)	1	1	2
Aslanbek Khushtov (RUS)	4	5
Mindaugas Ežerskis (LTU)	0	0

Semifinals
Marek Švec (CZE)	0
Aslanbek Khushtov (RUS)	5^{F}

=== Repechage ===
Repechage round 1
Asset Mambetov (KAZ)	2	2
Daigoro Timoncini (ITA)	1	0

Repechage round 2
Han Tae-young (KOR)	1	1	3
Elis Guri (ALB)	1	1	1
Asset Mambetov (KAZ)	1	1	3
Mindaugas Ežerskis (LTU)	2	1	1

Bronze medals
Han Tae-young (KOR)	1	1
Adam Wheeler (USA)	3	4
Asset Mambetov (KAZ)	1	6
Marek Švec (CZE)	1	0

== Final standing ==
Rank	Athlete
1st place, gold medalist(s)	Aslanbek Khushtov (RUS)
2nd place, silver medalist(s)	Mirko Englich (GER)
3rd place, bronze medalist(s)	Adam Wheeler (USA)
3rd place, bronze medalist(s)	Marek Švec (CZE)
5	Han Tae-young (KOR)
6	Mindaugas Ežerskis (LTU)
7	Elis Guri (ALB)
8	Jiang Huachen (CHN)
9	Mehmet Özal (TUR)
10	Daigoro Timoncini (ITA)
11	Ramaz Nozadze (GEO)
12	Karam Gaber (EGY)
13	Kaloyan Dinchev (BUL)
13	Oleg Kryoka (UKR)
15	Ghasem Rezaei (IRI)
16	Theodoros Tounousidis (GRE)
16	Lajos Virág (HUN)
18	Samir Bouguerra (ALG)
18	Kenzo Kato (JPN)
DQ	Asset Mambetov (KAZ)

- Asset Mambetov of Kazakhstan originally won the bronze medal, but he was disqualified in November 2016 after he tested positive for Stanozolol.
