= Wrestling at the 2007 Military World Games =

- Dates: 16–20 October 2007

Wrestling at the 2007 Military World Games was held in Hyderabad, India from 16 to 20 October 2007.

== Medal summary ==
=== Men's freestyle ===
Event	Gold	Silver	Bronze
55 kg	Yang Jae-hoon; South Korea	Gevork Markaryan; Ukraine	Abdul Karim Wahedi; Afghanistan
55 kg	Yang Jae-hoon; South Korea	Gevork Markaryan; Ukraine	Adkhamjon Achilov; Uzbekistan
60 kg	Ramazan Saritov; Russia	Namig Sevdimov; Azerbaijan	Ryom Jong-min; North Korea
60 kg	Ramazan Saritov; Russia	Namig Sevdimov; Azerbaijan	Damir Zakhartdinov; Uzbekistan
66 kg	Alan Dudaev; Russia	Yang Chun-song; North Korea	Pavel Hrybailau; Belarus
66 kg	Alan Dudaev; Russia	Yang Chun-song; North Korea	Jung Young-ho; South Korea
74 kg	Ahmet Gülhan; Turkey	Aliaksandr Matyl; Belarus	Peter Weisenberger; Germany
74 kg	Ahmet Gülhan; Turkey	Aliaksandr Matyl; Belarus	Denis Tsargush; Russia
84 kg	Sazhid Sazhidov; Russia	Radosław Horbik; Poland	Lee Du-soo; South Korea
84 kg	Sazhid Sazhidov; Russia	Radosław Horbik; Poland	Abdul Ammaev; Uzbekistan
96 kg	Khadzhimurat Gatsalov; Russia	Jafar Daliri; Iran	Recep Çakır; Turkey
96 kg	Khadzhimurat Gatsalov; Russia	Jafar Daliri; Iran	Mihai Stroia; Romania
120 kg	Kuramagomed Kuramagomedov; Russia	Recep Kara; Turkey	Fardin Masoumi; Iran
120 kg	Kuramagomed Kuramagomedov; Russia	Recep Kara; Turkey	Serhii Priadun; Ukraine

=== Men's Greco-Roman ===
Event	Gold	Silver	Bronze
55 kg	Park Eun-chul; South Korea	Vugar Rahimov; Ukraine	Maksim Kazharski; Belarus
55 kg	Park Eun-chul; South Korea	Vugar Rahimov; Ukraine	Nazyr Mankiev; Russia
60 kg	Vyacheslav Dzhaste; Russia	Taleh Israfilov; Azerbaijan	Kim Kun-chol; South Korea
60 kg	Vyacheslav Dzhaste; Russia	Taleh Israfilov; Azerbaijan	Svajūnas Adomaitis; Lithuania
66 kg	Sergey Kovalenko; Russia	Kim Kum-chol; North Korea	Elbrus Mammadov; Azerbaijan
66 kg	Sergey Kovalenko; Russia	Kim Kum-chol; North Korea	Kim Soo-min; South Korea
74 kg	Varteres Samurgashev; Russia	Mehdi Mohammadi; Iran	Julian Kwit; Poland
74 kg	Varteres Samurgashev; Russia	Mehdi Mohammadi; Iran	Hüseyin Akburu; Turkey
84 kg	Aleksey Mishin; Russia	Andrei Baranouski; Belarus	Vitaliy Lishchynskiy; Ukraine
84 kg	Aleksey Mishin; Russia	Andrei Baranouski; Belarus	Laimutis Adomaitis; Lithuania
96 kg	Mehmet Özal; Turkey	Georgios Koutsioumpas; Greece	Mindaugas Ežerskis; Lithuania
96 kg	Mehmet Özal; Turkey	Georgios Koutsioumpas; Greece	Aslanbek Khushtov; Russia
120 kg	Aleksandr Anuchin; Russia	Ioseb Chugoshvili; Belarus	Łukasz Banak; Poland
120 kg	Aleksandr Anuchin; Russia	Ioseb Chugoshvili; Belarus	Xenofon Koutsioumpas; Greece

== Medal table ==
Rank	Nation	Gold	Silver	Bronze	Total
1	Russia	10	0	3	13
2	Turkey	2	1	2	5
3	South Korea	2	0	4	6
4	Belarus	0	3	2	5
5	Ukraine	0	2	2	4
6	Azerbaijan	0	2	1	3
6	Iran	0	2	1	3
6	North Korea	0	2	1	3
9	Poland	0	1	2	3
10	Greece	0	1	1	2
11	Lithuania	0	0	3	3
11	Uzbekistan	0	0	3	3
13	Afghanistan	0	0	1	1
13	Germany	0	0	1	1
13	Romania	0	0	1	1
Totals (15 entries)		14	14	28	56
