= 2003 Asian Wrestling Championships =

- Host city: New Delhi, India
- Dates: 5–8 June 2003
- Stadium: Indira Gandhi Arena

Champions
- Freestyle: Iran
- Greco-Roman: Iran
- Women: Japan

The 2003 Asian Wrestling Championships were held in New Delhi, India. The event took place from 5 to 8 June 2003.

== Medal table ==
Rank	Nation	Gold	Silver	Bronze	Total
1	Iran	7	4	2	13
2	Japan	5	2	0	7
3	Kazakhstan	4	0	5	9
4	South Korea	2	3	4	9
5	Uzbekistan	1	4	0	5
6	Mongolia	1	2	2	5
7	Tajikistan	1	1	0	2
8	India	0	4	6	10
9	Chinese Taipei	0	1	0	1
10	Kyrgyzstan	0	0	1	1
Totals (10 entries)		21	21	20	62

== Team ranking ==
Rank	Men's freestyle		Men's Greco-Roman		Women's freestyle	
Rank	Team	Points	Team	Points	Team	Points
1	Iran	69	Iran	60	Japan	65
2	India	47	Kazakhstan	57	India	54
3	Kazakhstan	43	South Korea	56	Mongolia	36
4	Mongolia	38	Uzbekistan	47	Kazakhstan	33
5	Japan	35	Japan	38	Chinese Taipei	33
6	Uzbekistan	32	India	32	South Korea	31
7	South Korea	32	Kyrgyzstan	29	Vietnam	13
8	Tajikistan	19	Syria	18	Kyrgyzstan	7
9	Chinese Taipei	15	Vietnam	14		
10	Kyrgyzstan	14	Chinese Taipei	8		

== Medal summary ==
=== Men's freestyle ===
Event	Gold	Silver	Bronze
55 kg	Mohammad Aslani; Iran	Yang Jae-hoon; South Korea	Kripa Shankar Patel; India
60 kg	Morad Mohammadi; Iran	Damir Zakhartdinov; Uzbekistan	Sushil Kumar; India
66 kg	Hassan Tahmasebi; Iran	Kazuhiko Ikematsu; Japan	Norjingiin Bayarmagnai; Mongolia
74 kg	Yusup Abdusalomov; Tajikistan	Reza Ramezanzadeh; Iran	Sujeet Maan; India
84 kg	Pejman Dorostkar; Iran	Shamil Aliev; Tajikistan	Magomed Kurugliyev; Kazakhstan
96 kg	Alireza Heidari; Iran	Magomed Ibragimov; Uzbekistan	Nurzhan Katayev; Kazakhstan
120 kg	Alireza Rezaei; Iran	Palwinder Singh Cheema; India	Marid Mutalimov; Kazakhstan

=== Men's Greco-Roman ===
Event	Gold	Silver	Bronze
55 kg	Asset Imanbayev; Kazakhstan	Hamid Bavafa; Iran	Im Dae-won; South Korea
60 kg	Asliddin Khudoyberdiev; Uzbekistan	Ali Ashkani; Iran	Kim Bong-suk; South Korea
66 kg	Parviz Zeidvand; Iran	Gurbinder Singh; India	Kanatbek Begaliev; Kyrgyzstan
74 kg	Choi Duk-hoon; South Korea	Jahongir Turdiev; Uzbekistan	Rustem Baiseitov; Kazakhstan
84 kg	Abdulla Zhabrailov; Kazakhstan	Evgeniy Erofaylov; Uzbekistan	Hossein Marashian; Iran
96 kg	Han Tae-young; South Korea	Masoud Hashemzadeh; Iran	Margulan Assembekov; Kazakhstan
120 kg	Georgiy Tsurtsumia; Kazakhstan	Park Woo; South Korea	Alireza Gharibi; Iran

=== Women's freestyle ===
Event	Gold	Silver	Bronze
48 kg	Mika Noguchi; Japan	Kao Wei-chien; Chinese Taipei	Kamini Yadav; India
51 kg	Ninako Hattori; Japan	Tsogtbazaryn Enkhjargal; Mongolia	Renu Bala; India
55 kg	Naidangiin Otgonjargal; Mongolia	Sayuri Tatemoto; Japan	Lee Na-lae; South Korea
59 kg	Rena Iwama; Japan	Ochirbatyn Myagmarsüren; Mongolia	Alka Tomar; India
63 kg	Ayako Shoda; Japan	Geetika Jakhar; India	Hang Jin-young; South Korea
67 kg	Norie Saito; Japan	Kiran Sihag; India	None awarded
72 kg	Svetlana Yaroshevich; Kazakhstan	Kang Min-jeong; South Korea	Ochirbatyn Burmaa; Mongolia

== Participating nations ==
160 competitors from 15 nations competed.

- Bangladesh (4)
- Chinese Taipei (13)
- India (20)
- Iran (14)
- Japan (21)
- Kazakhstan (19)
- Kyrgyzstan (10)
- Mongolia (10)
- Nepal (1)
- Philippines (2)
- South Korea (17)
- Syria (9)
- Tajikistan (2)
- Uzbekistan (11)
- Vietnam (7)
