= Wrestling at the 1997 Mediterranean Games =

Wrestling competition

- Dates: June 1997

The wrestling tournament at the 1997 Mediterranean Games was held in Bari, Italy.

== Medal table ==
* Host nation (Italy)

Rank	Nation	Gold	Silver	Bronze	Total
1	Turkey	8	3	2	13
2	Greece	3	3	3	9
3	France	1	3	1	5
4	Italy	1	2	2	5
5	Syria	1	1	2	4
6	FR Yugoslavia	1	0	1	2
7	Croatia	0	1	1	2
8	Albania	0	1	0	1
8	Cyprus	0	1	0	1
10	Algeria	0	0	1	1
10	Egypt	0	0	1	1
10	Slovenia	0	0	1	1
Totals (12 entries)		15	15	15	45

== Medalists ==
=== Men's freestyle ===
Event	Gold	Silver	Bronze
54 kg	Mevlana Kulaç; Turkey	David Legrand; France	Yassin Al Orabi; Syria
58 kg	Harun Doğan; Turkey	Konstantinos Kesanidis; Greece	Mohamed Amine Benhamadi; Algeria
63 kg	Giovanni Schillaci; Italy	Arout Parsekian; Cyprus	Muharrem Demireğen; Turkey
69 kg	Yüksel Şanlı; Turkey	Ahmad Al-Aosta; Syria	Salvatore Rinella; Italy
76 kg	Kamil Kocaağaoğlu; Turkey	Lazaros Loizidis; Greece	Angelo Camarda; Italy
97 kg	Aftantil Xanthopoulos; Greece	Ndue Njebza; Albania	William Rombouts; France
125 kg	Zekeriya Güçlü; Turkey	Mario Miketek; Croatia	Anastasios Symeonidis; Greece

=== Men's Greco-Roman ===
Event	Gold	Silver	Bronze
54 kg	Khaled Al-Faraj; Syria	Francesco Costantino; Italy	Ercan Yıldız; Turkey
58 kg	Efstathios Theodosiadis; Greece	Ergüder Bekişdamat; Turkey	Zakaria Al Nached; Syria
63 kg	Mehmet Akif Pirim; Turkey	Thierry Bastien; France	Aristidis Rubenian; Greece
69 kg	Nandor Sabo; Yugoslavia	Mecnun Güler; Turkey	Rade Bačič; Slovenia
76 kg	Yvon Riemer; France	Dimitrios Avramis; Greece	Karam Gaber; Egypt
85 kg	Hamza Yerlikaya; Turkey	Philippe Nagy; France	Aleksandar Jovančević; Yugoslavia
97 kg	Hakkı Başar; Turkey	Giuseppe Giunta; Italy	Konstantinos Thanos; Greece
125 kg	Anastasios Sofianidis; Greece	Şaban Donat; Turkey	Stipe Damjanović; Croatia
