= Ernesto Peña =

Cuban Greco-Roman wrestler

Personal information
- Full name: Ernesto Peña Williams
- Nationality: Cuba
- Born: 8 October 1978 (age 47) Nueva Gerona, Cuba
- Height: 1.82 m (5 ft 11 1/2 in)
- Weight: 96 kg (212 lb)

Sport
- Style: Greco-Roman
- Club: Cerro Pelado
- Coach: Carlos Ulacia
Medal record
Men's Greco-Roman wrestling
Representing Cuba
World Championships
Silver medal – second place	2001 Patras	96 kg
Pan American Games
Gold medal – first place	2003 Santo Domingo	96 kg

Ernesto Peña Williams (born October 8, 1978, in Nueva Gerona) is a retired amateur Cuban Greco-Roman wrestler, who competed in the men's heavyweight category. He won the gold medal in the 96-kg division at the 2003 Pan American Games in Santo Domingo, Dominican Republic, and was later selected to the Cuban team for the 2004 Summer Olympics in Athens. Throughout his sporting career, Pena trained for the wrestling team at Cerro Pelado Sports Club in Havana, under his personal coach and mentor Carlos Ulacia.

Pena emerged himself into the global scene at the 2001 World Wrestling Championships in Patras, Greece, where he picked up a silver medal on his first ever final match against Russia's Aleksandr Bezruchkin. He continued to reach the summit of the world rankings, by finishing fourth at the 2002 World Wrestling Championships in Moscow, Russia, and by overpowering U.S. wrestler Justin Ruiz to snatch the heavyweight Greco-Roman wrestling title at the 2003 Pan American Games in Santo Domingo, Dominican Republic.

At the 2004 Summer Olympics in Athens, Pena qualified for the Cuban team in the men's 96 kg class by receiving a berth from the first Olympic Qualification Tournament in Novi Sad, Serbia and Montenegro. In the preliminary pool, Pena upset U.S. wrestler and 2000 Olympic bronze medalist Garrett Lowney on his opening bout, and then threw out Hungary's Lajos Virág into the ring for a spot in the quarterfinals. Pena suffered his major defeat from Turkey's Mehmet Özal in the quarterfinal match on the next day's session, but offered a chance to redeem himself in the ring by ousting Kyrgyzstan's Gennady Chkhaidze for a fifth-place finish. When Iran's Masoud Hashemzadeh was disqualified for a bronze medal protest, Pena uplifted his position to fourth, and nearly missed out the podium.
