= Rafael Samurgashev =

Armenian Greco-Roman wrestler

Personal information
- Born: 28 July 1963 (age 62) Rostov-on-Don, Russian SFSR, Soviet Union
- Height: 1.83 m (6 ft 0 in)
- Weight: 112 kg (247 lb)

Sport
- Sport: Wrestling
- Event: Greco-Roman
- Club: KSV Aalen
- Coached by: Suren Kazarian; Vladimir Stashkevich

Rafael Samurgashev (Armenian: Ռաֆաէլ Սամուրգաշև, born 28 July 1963) is an Armenian retired former World champion and European champion Greco-Roman wrestler. He competed at the 2000 Summer Olympics in the Men's Greco-Roman 97 kg division.

At twelve years old, he was inducted into the national team of Russia and has repeatedly represented the country in various international competitions. Rafael also took title of one Greco-Roman World Championships and was European Champion twice in men's Greco-Roman, Light Heavyweight (+90). Also he was the coach of two Olympic gold medal winner Russian wrestlers. He has been also awarded by his country's president, Vladimir Putin, for all he has done for wrestling in Russia and was also appointed the president of the Russian Wrestling Federation.

From 1997 to 2008 Samurgashev Rafael Varteresovich headed the Federation of Greco-Roman wrestling Rostov region, and from 2009 to 2013 – Wrestling Federation Rostov region, combine two of the sport: the Greco-Roman and freestyle wrestling. The main tasks that Samurgashev Rafael Varteresovich set himself and the staff federations were to attract more children and adolescents to a healthy lifestyle, prevention of crime among adolescents and preparation of sports reserve in the national teams of Russia and the Rostov region.

Since 2001 in the city of Rostov-on-Don, the international tournament in Greco-Roman wrestling on the "Prizes Samurgashev Brothers", the only junior tournament in Russia, included in the calendar of the International Federation of the combined styles of fighting. It is attended by representatives of the near and far abroad. The tournament showcased athletic competition in Rostov-on-Don and the Rostov region and was attended by regional residents.

In 2002, at the initiative of Samurgashev Rafael Varteresovich was created by the state educational institution of additional education of children "Regional specialized school of Olympic reserve number 35". Active contribution Samurgashev Rafael Varteresovich the development of the material base of schools, creation of favorable conditions for the training process have been highly appreciated by the Ministry of Sports of the Rostov region. In 2005 the school was renamed the State educational institution of additional education for children "Regional specialized school of Olympic reserve number 35 named Samurgashev Brothers." In 2008 Samurgashev Rafael Varteresovich was appointed director.

== Personal involvement ==
Samurgashev Rafael Varteresovich successfully put into practice the idea of the development of youth sports in the Rostov region. In all areas of the city of Rostov-on-Don are working successfully in wrestling schools. Branch offices in Greco-Roman and freestyle wrestling in urban and rural areas of the region: Azov, Aksay, Bataisk, Volgodonsk, Salsk, Taganrog, Zernogradsky, Myasnikovsky, Neklinovsky proletarian and Sal areas.

For his contribution to the development of the Greco-Roman wrestling Samurgashev Rafael Varteresovich awarded a gold and silver medal of the International Federation of the combined styles of fighting.

During the period of his leadership sports federations Rostov region took the leading position in the sport, "Greco-Roman wrestling." Every year, at least 20 athletes are part of the field of Russian national team in Greco-Roman wrestling.

Rafael Varteresovich President of the Interregional Association of Public Unions Wrestling Southern Federal District, vice president of the Wrestling Federation of Rostov region.

Rafael Samurgashev is the president of the Russian Wrestling Federation. Rafael is the older brother of Greco-Roman wrestling Olympic Champion Varteres Samurgashev.

== Achievements ==
- World Champion
- European Champion
- Honoured Coach of Russia (1995)
- Honored Worker of Physical Culture of Russia (2002)
- International Master of Sports

== Honors ==
- Medal of the Order "For Services to the Motherland" II degree (2006)
- Honorary Badge "For merits in the development of physical culture and sport" (for his long and fruitful work, for services to the development of physical culture and sports of Russia)
- Silver Medal of the International Federation of the combined styles of fighting
- Gold Medal of the International Federation of the combined styles of fighting
- Commemorative Medal "For great contribution to the preservation of Armenian culture on the Don"
