= Gennady Chkhaidze =

Georgian Greco-Roman wrestler

Personal information
- Full name: Gennady Chkhaidze
- Nationality: Georgia; Kyrgyzstan; Uzbekistan
- Born: 19 June 1974 (age 52) Tbilisi, Georgian SSR; Soviet Union
- Height: 1.86 m (6 ft 1 in)
- Weight: 96 kg (212 lb)

Sport
- Style: Greco-Roman
- Club: Trade Union Sports Club (UZB)
- Coach: Kamil Fatkulin
Medal record
Men's Greco-Roman wrestling
Representing Uzbekistan
Asian Games
| Bronze medal – third place | 2006 Doha | 96 kg |
Asian Championships
| Gold medal – first place | 2004 Almaty | 96 kg |

Gennady Chkhaidze (Georgian: გენნადი ჩხაიძე; Uzbek: Геннадий Чхаидзе; born 19 June 1974 in Tbilisi) is a retired amateur Georgian Greco-Roman wrestler, who competed in the men's heavyweight category. Chkhaidze finished fifth in two editions of the Olympic Games (2000 and 2004) under different banners Georgia and Kyrgyzstan, and later claimed a bronze medal in the men's heavyweight division at the 2006 Asian Games in Doha, Qatar, when he altered his allegiances with the Uzbekistan team. Before ending his sporting career in 2008, Chkhaidze trained for the Trade Union Sports Club in Tashkent, Uzbekistan, under head coach Kamil Fatkulin.

Representing his native Georgia, Chkhaidze made his official debut at the 2000 Summer Olympics in Sydney, where he competed in the men's heavyweight division (97 kg). During the preliminary pool, Chkhaidze upset Polish wrestler and two-time Olympic champion Andrzej Wroński with a striking effort, and fell Turkey's Hakkı Başar off the ring to earn a spot in the knockout rounds, scoring a cumulative total of six points and a set of two triumphs. Followed by the next day's session, Chkhaidze lost his quarterfinal match to U.S. wrestler and junior world champion Garrett Lowney in overtime, until he settled for a fifth-place finish in a consolation battle against Kazakhstan's Sergey Matviyenko.

At the 2004 Summer Olympics in Athens, Chkhaidze qualified under the new Kyrgyzstan team for the men's 96 kg class by receiving a berth and a gold medal from the Asian Championships in Almaty, Kazakhstan. Chkhaidze continued to deliver a more powerful performance by beating Bulgaria's Kaloyan Dinchev and Palau's John Tarkong in the preliminary pool, before he lost his quarterfinal match to Iranian wrestler Masoud Hashemzadeh. Despite receiving another defeat from Cuba's Ernesto Peña in a classification match, Chkhaidze upgraded his position again to fifth for the second time after Hashemzadeh was disqualified for a bronze medal protest. Shortly after the Games, Chkhaidze transferred his allegiance to the Uzbek team due to citizenship issues with Kyrgyzstan.

When Chkhaidze competed for Uzbekistan at the 2006 Asian Games in Doha, Qatar, he flourished his wrestling career by picking up the bronze medal in his match against Iraq's Ali Nadhim after his sudden upset from South Korea's Han Tae-Young in the opening round.
