= Kaloyan Dinchev =

Bulgarian Greco-Roman wrestler

Personal information
- Full name: Kaloyan Dinchev
- Nationality: Bulgaria
- Born: 3 February 1980 (age 46) Stara Zagora, Bulgaria
- Height: 1.78 m (5 ft 10 in)
- Weight: 96 kg (212 lb)

Sport
- Style: Greco-Roman
- Club: Slavia Litex
- Coach: Bratan Tzenov
Medal record
Men's Greco-Roman wrestling
Representing Bulgaria
World Championships
Bronze medal – third place	2006 Guangzhou	96 kg

Kaloyan Dinchev (Bulgarian: Калоян Динчев; born February 3, 1980, in Stara Zagora) is an amateur Bulgarian Greco-Roman wrestler, who played for the men's heavyweight category. He won a bronze medal for his division at the 2006 World Wrestling Championships in Guangzhou, China. He is also a two-time Olympian, and a member of Slavia Litex Wrestling Club in Sofia, under his personal coach Bratan Tzenov.

Dinchev made his official debut for the 2004 Summer Olympics in Athens, where he placed second in the preliminary pool of the men's 96 kg class, against Kyrgyzstan's Gennady Chkhaidze and Palau's John Tarkong.

At the 2008 Summer Olympics in Beijing, Dinchev competed for the second time in the men's 96 kg class. He received a bye for the preliminary round of sixteen, before losing out to three-time Olympian and Czech wrestler Marek Švec, with a three-set technical score (4–1, 1–3, 1–1), and a classification point score of 1–3.
