= Ben Vincent =

Australian wrestler

Personal information
- Born: Benjamin Vincent; 3 November 1976 (age 49) Canberra, Australian Capital Territory, Australia
- Height: 181 cm (5 ft 11 in)
- Weight: 94 kg (207 lb)

Sport
- Country: Australia
- Sport: Freestyle wrestling Greco-Roman wrestling
- Weight class: 97–100 kg (214–220 lb)

Benjamin Vincent (born 3 November 1976) is an Australian former wrestler who competed in the men's freestyle 100 kg event at the 1996 Summer Olympics and in the men's Greco-Roman 97 kg event at the 2000 Summer Olympics.
