= Alim Selimau =

Belarusian wrestler

Medal record

Men's Greco-Roman wrestling

Representing Belarus

World Championships
Gold medal – first place	2005 Budapest	84 kg
Gold medal – first place	2011 Istanbul	84 kg

Alim Selimau (born January 26, 1983, in Kasumkent, Russia) is a Belarusian male Greco-Roman wrestler. He competes in the men's -84 kg category, and won World Championship gold medals at the 2005 and 2011 World Championships. He also competed at the 2012 Summer Olympics, where he lost to eventual winner Alan Khugaev in the second round.
