= FR Yugoslavia at the 1997 Mediterranean Games =

- IOC code: SCG
- NOC: Olympic Committee of Serbia and Montenegro

in Bari
- Medals Ranked 9th: Gold 5 Silver 4 Bronze 13 Total 22

Mediterranean Games appearances (overview)
- 1997; 2001; 2005

Other related appearances
- Yugoslavia (1951–1991); Montenegro (2009–pres.); Serbia (2009–pres.); Kosovo (2018–pres.)

FR Yugoslavia competed at the 1997 Mediterranean Games held in Bari, Italy.

== Medals by sport ==
Sport	Gold	Silver	Bronze	Total
Shooting	2	2	1	5
Athletics	1	0	1	2
Wrestling	1	0	1	2
Water polo	1	0	0	1
Judo	0	1	3	4
Table tennis	0	1	2	3
Karate	0	0	2	2
Swimming	0	0	2	2
Basketball	0	0	1	1
Totals (9 entries)	5	4	13	22

== List of Medalists ==
Medal	Name	Sport	Event
Gold	Stevan Zorić	Athletics	High jump
Gold	Water polo team: Dragan Jovanović Petar Trbojević Aleksandar Nikolić Risto Maljković Dejan Savić Danilo Ikodinović Željko Vičević Veljko Uskoković Aleksandar Ćirić Aleksandar Šapić Vladimir Vujasinović Nenad Vukanić Nikola Kuljača	Water polo	Men's tournament
Gold	Nemanja Mirosavljev	Shooting	50 metre rifle three positions
Gold	Jasna Šekarić	Shooting	25m Pistol
Gold	Nandor Sabo	Wrestling	Greco-Roman 69kg
Silver	Stevan Pletikosić	Shooting	50 m Rifle prone
Silver	Marijana Frič	Shooting	50 metre rifle three positions
Silver	Slobodan Grujić, Aleksandar Karakašević	Table tennis	Men's doubles
Silver	Leposava Marković	Judo	48kg
Bronze	Olivera Jevtić	Athletics	10.000m
Bronze	Veselin Mićović	Karate	Open
Bronze	Roksanda Lazarević	Karate	65 kg
Bronze	Basketball team	Basketball	Men's tournament
Bronze	Vladan Marković	Swimming	200m Butterfly
Bronze	Vladan Marković	Swimming	100m Butterfly
Bronze	Aleksandar Jovančević	Wrestling	Greco-Roman 85kg
Bronze	Slobodan Grujić	Table tennis	Men's singles
Bronze	Fatima Isanović, Marta Poljak	Table tennis	Women's doubles
Bronze	Jasna Šekarić	Shooting	10m Air Pistol
Bronze	Dano Pantić	Judo	95kg
Bronze	Nada Ognjenović	Judo	66kg
Bronze	Mara Kovačević	Judo	+ 72kg
