= Georgios Koutsioumpas =

Greek Greco-Roman wrestler

Personal information
- Full name: Georgios Koutsioumpas
- Nationality: Greece
- Born: 18 May 1981 (age 45) Trikala, Greece
- Height: 1.92 m (6 ft 3 1/2 in)
- Weight: 96 kg (212 lb)

Sport
- Style: Greco-Roman
- Club: Atlas Mytilenes
- Coach: Sotirios Petrakis
Medal record
Men's Greco-Roman wrestling
Representing Greece
Mediterranean Games
Silver medal – second place	2005 Almería	96 kg

Georgios Koutsioumpas (Greek: Γεώργιος Κουτσιούμπας; born May 18, 1981, in Trikala) is an amateur Greek Greco-Roman wrestler, who competed in the men's heavyweight category. Koutsioumpas represented his home nation Greece at the 2004 Summer Olympics in Athens, and later picked up a silver medal in the 96-kg division at the 2005 Mediterranean Games in Almería, Spain. Throughout his sporting career, Koutsioumpas, along with his older brother Xenofon, trained as a member of the Greco-Roman wrestling team for Olympiacos F.C. in Piraeus, with whom he won the European CELA Cup in 2006. Since 2012 they have been training at Atlas Mytilenes under their head coach Sotirios Petrakis.

Koutsioumpas qualified as a member of the Greek squad in the men's 96 kg class at the 2004 Summer Olympics in Athens by receiving an allocated place and an automatic spot for the host nation from the International Federation of Associated Wrestling (French: Fédération Internationale des Luttes Associées, FILA). By the delight of the boisterous home crowd inside the Ano Liossa Olympic Hall, Koutsioumpas opened his match by edging Kazakhstan's Asset Mambetov out of the mat with an effortless throw, but suffered a tedious 6–11 blowout from Egypt's Karam Gaber on his second bout. Despite a single loss, Koutsioumpas continued to grapple powerfully against Poland's Marek Sitnik and paid off by a 3–2 sudden death decision. Finishing third in the prelim pool, Koutsioumpas' performance fell short to put him through into the quarterfinals, as he left his home crowd in agony. When Iran's Masoud Hashemzadeh was disqualified for an illegal protest during the bronze medal match, Koutsioumpas' position was eventually upgraded to seventh.
