= Hassene Fkiri =

Tunisian wrestler

Personal information
- Nationality: Tunisian; Australian
- Born: 22 December 1973 (age 52)

Sport
- Sport: Wrestling

Hassene Fkiri (born 22 December 1973) is a Tunisian wrestler. He competed in the men's Greco-Roman 97 kg at the 2000 Summer Olympics. He later wrestled for Australia at the 2010 Commonwealth Games and won the silver medal, but was ejected from the competition after being disqualified during the gold medal bout for making offensive gestures.
