= Aleksey Cheglakov =

Personal information
- Full name: Aleksey Cheglakov
- Nationality: Uzbekistan
- Born: 13 March 1974 (age 52) Kirov, RSFSR; Soviet Union
- Height: 1.85 m (6 ft 1 in)
- Weight: 90 kg (198 lb)

Sport
- Style: Greco-Roman
- Club: Trade Union Sports Club (UZB)
- Coach: Kamil Fatkulin
Medal record
Men's Greco-Roman wrestling
Representing Uzbekistan
Asian Games
Gold medal – first place	2002 Busan	96 kg
Asian Championships
Gold medal – first place	2001 Ulaanbaatar	97 kg
Bronze medal – third place	2004 Almaty	96 kg

Aleksey Cheglakov (Uzbek: Алексей Чеглаков; born 13 March 1974) is a retired amateur Russian and Uzbekistani Greco-Roman wrestler, who competed in the men's heavyweight category. Throughout his sporting career, Cheglakov has claimed two gold medals each in the same division at the 2001 Asian Wrestling Championships in Ulaanbaatar, Mongolia, and at the 2002 Asian Games in Busan, South Korea, and later represented his nation Uzbekistan at the 2004 Summer Olympics. Cheglakov also trained for the Trade Union Sports Club in Tashkent, Uzbekistan, under head coach Kamil Fatkulin.

Cheglakov set a sporting headline at the 2002 Asian Games in Busan, South Korea, where he prevailed over host nation's Park Myung-Suk to take home the gold medal in the men's heavyweight category.

At the 2004 Summer Olympics in Athens, Cheglakov qualified as a 30-year-old for the men's 96 kg class by receiving a berth and a bronze medal from the Asian Championships in Almaty, Kazakhstan. He scored a total of six technical points to beat Latvia's Igors Kostins, but ended his Olympic campaign with a dramatic defeat against Turkey's Mehmet Özal, who later continued his quest to take home the bronze medal, finishing second only in the preliminary pool, and fourteenth in the final rankings.
