= Lajos Virág =

Hungarian Greco-Roman wrestler

Personal information
- Nationality: Hungary
- Born: 27 June 1977 (age 49) Eger, Hungary
- Height: 1.87 m (6 ft 1 1/2 in)
- Weight: 96 kg (212 lb)

Sport
- Sport: Wrestling
- Event: Greco-Roman
- Club: Vasas Budapest
- Coached by: Jeno Bódi
Medal record
Men's Greco-Roman wrestling
Representing Hungary
World Championships
| Silver medal – second place | 2005 Budapest | 96 kg |

Lajos Virág (born 27 June 1977 in Eger) is an amateur Hungarian Greco-Roman wrestler, who played for the men's heavyweight category. He won the silver medal for his division at the 2005 World Wrestling Championships in Budapest, Hungary, losing out to Turkey's Hamza Yerlikaya.

Virag made his official debut at the 2004 Summer Olympics in Athens, where he placed second in the preliminary pool of the men's 96 kg class, against Cuba's Ernesto Peña and United States' Garrett Lowney.

At the 2008 Summer Olympics in Beijing, Virag lost the second preliminary match of the 96 kg class to another American wrestler Adam Wheeler, who eventually won the bronze medal in this event.
