= Marek Sitnik =

Polish Greco-Roman wrestler

Personal information
- Full name: Marek Sitnik
- Nationality: Poland
- Born: 20 April 1975 (age 51) Olsztyn, Poland
- Height: 1.90 m (6 ft 3 in)
- Weight: 96 kg (212 lb)

Sport
- Style: Greco-Roman
- Club: Śląsk Wrocław
- Coach: Jerzy Adamek

Marek Sitnik (born 20 April 1975 in Olsztyn) is a Polish former Greco-Roman wrestler, who competed in the men's heavyweight category. Sitnik won silver medals in the 90-kg division at both the 1993 and 1994 European Junior Championships, and later competed in two Olympic Games (2000 and 2004). Throughout his sporting career, Sitnik trained at Śląsk Wrestling Club in Wrocław, under his personal coach and mentor Jerzy Adamek.

Sitnik made his official debut at the 2000 Summer Olympics in Sydney, competing in the men's super heavyweight division (130 kg). Sitnik delivered a mediocre effort inside the ring after losing out three straight matches each to Turkey's Fatih Bakir by a sudden death point, Czech Republic's David Vála (0–3), and Israel's Yuri Evseichik, who eventually placed fourth at the end of prelim pool. Sitnik failed to advance further into the quarterfinals, as he finished seventeenth in the final standings.

At the 2004 Summer Olympics in Athens, Sitnik qualified for his second team, as a 29-year-old veteran, in the men's 96 kg class by rounding out the top eleven spots from the 2003 World Wrestling Championships in Créteil, France. He lost his opening match to Egypt's eventual gold medalist Karam Gaber, but redeemed himself to pull Kazakhstan's Asset Mambetov off the mat on his second bout with an effortless 3–0 decision. Facing off against the host nation's Georgios Koutsioumpas, Sitnik could not exert enough power to subdue him into the ring, as he lost the match by a single-point deficit. Finishing third in the prelim pool and fourteenth overall in the final standings, Sitnik's performance fell short to put him further into the game.
