= John Tarkong =

Palauan Greco-Roman wrestler (born 1965)

John Tarkong OLY
Personal information
- Full name: John Tarkong, Jr.
- Nationality: Palau
- Born: 7 December 1965 (age 60) Washington, D.C., United States
- Height: 1.73 m (5 ft 8 in)
- Weight: 96 kg (212 lb)

Sport
- Style: Greco-Roman
- Club: Palauan Amateur Wrestling; Federation
- Coach: Lee Joong-Sub

John Tarkong, Jr. (born December 7, 1965, in Washington, District of Columbia, United States) is a retired amateur Palauan Greco-Roman wrestler, who competed in the men's heavyweight category. Tarkong represented Palau at the 2004 Summer Olympics, where he became the nation's flag bearer in the opening ceremony. During his sporting career, he has been training for the Palauan Amateur Wrestling Federation under his personal coach Lee Joong-Sub.

Tarkong qualified for the Palauan squad, as a 38-year-old, in the men's 96 kg class at the 2004 Summer Olympics in Athens by receiving a berth from the Olympic Qualifying Tournament in Tashkent, Uzbekistan. He received two straight losses due to technical superiority and no classification points in a preliminary pool match against Kyrgyzstan's Gennady Chkhaidze and Bulgaria's Kaloyan Dinchev, finishing twentieth overall out of twenty-two wrestlers.
