= Arman Geghamyan =

Armenian Greco-Roman wrestler

Personal information
- Born: 12 September 1981 (age 44) Armenia
- Height: 1.82 m (5 ft 11 1/2 in)
- Weight: 96 kg (212 lb)

Sport
- Sport: Wrestling
- Event: Greco-Roman
- Club: Sports School Akhurian
- Coached by: Aram Gasparyan
Medal record
Men's Greco-Roman wrestling
Representing Armenia
World Cup
| Bronze medal – third place | 2009 Clermont-Ferrand | 96 kg |
| Silver medal – second place | 2010 Yerevan | 96 kg |

Arman Geghamyan (Armenian: Արման Գեղամյան, born 12 September 1981) is an Armenian Greco Roman wrestler.

Geghamyan was a member of the Armenian Greco-Roman wrestling team at the 2009 Wrestling World Cup. The Armenian team came in third place. Geghamyan personally won a bronze medal.

Geghamyan was a member of the Armenian Greco-Roman wrestling team at the 2009 and 2010 Wrestling World Cup. The Armenian team came in third place both years. Geghamyan personally won a bronze medal in 2009 and a silver medal in 2010.
