= Karam Gaber =

Egyptian wrestler (born 1979)

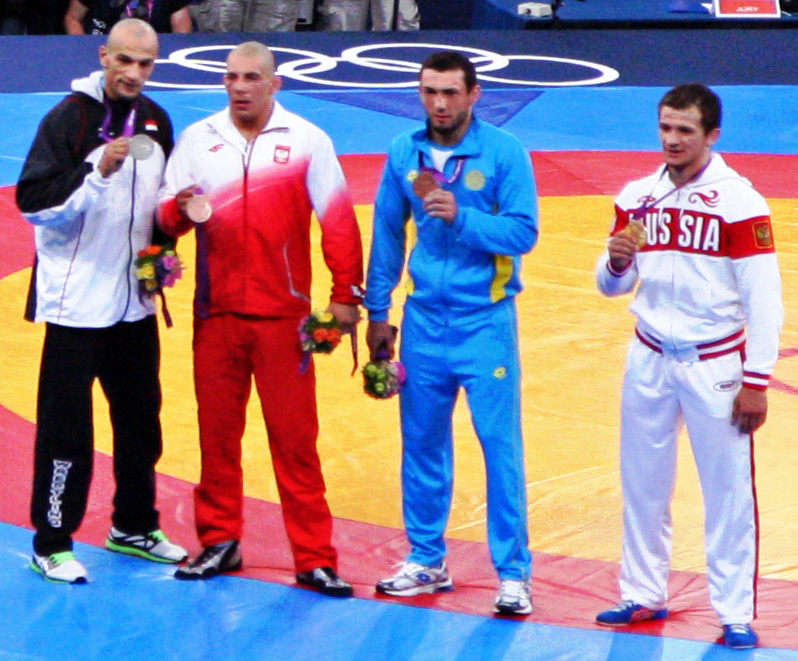
- Gaber (first L to R) at the 2012 Summer Olympics

Medal record

Men's Greco-Roman wrestling

Representing Egypt

Olympic Games
Gold medal – first place	2004 Athens	96 kg
Silver medal – second place	2012 London	84 kg

World Championships
Silver medal – second place	2002 Moscow	96 kg
Silver medal – second place	2003 Créteil	96 kg

Mediterranean Games
Gold medal – first place	2001 Tunis	97 kg
Gold medal – first place	2005 Almería	96 kg
Bronze medal – third place	1997 Bari	97 kg

Karam Ibrahim Gaber (Arabic: كرم ابراهيم جابر, born 1 September 1979) is an Egyptian Greco-Roman wrestler. He won the gold medal in the Men's Greco-Roman 96 kg at the 2004 Summer Olympics. Gaber won the silver medal at the 2003 World Championships. At the 2012 London Olympics, he won his second Olympic medal, winning a silver.

== Career ==
Gaber won at the 2004 Olympics Greco-Roman finals with a gap of 12 points (12–1), having competed against Ramaz Nozadze of Georgia who won the silver and Mehmet Özal of Turkey, whom Gaber defeated in the semifinals with 11 points (11–0). Gaber won the second gold medal for Egypt in Greco-Roman wrestling, the other being from the 1928 Summer Olympics.

Gaber competed in a mixed martial arts match against Kazuyuki Fujita (Greco-Roman Wrestling) at K-1's Dynamite event on 31 December 2004.

Gaber was Egypt's flagbearer at the Opening Ceremony for the 2008 Olympics in Beijing, although he failed to qualify for the quarter finals in Beijing. He won the silver medal at the 2012 Summer Olympics.

In 2015, Gaber was issued with a two-year ban for an anti-doping rule violation relating to whereabouts failures. Gaber appealed the decision, but it was upheld.

In February 2024, he announced his retirement due to an injury which prevented him from competing at the African Wrestling Olympic Qualification Tournament for the 2024 Summer Olympics, and he reconsidered recently and participated in a championship for veterans winning gold medal in 2023 and bronze medal in 2024, in Addition Karam Gaber is certified as Professional wrestling Coach

== Mixed martial arts record ==
Professional record breakdown
1 match	0 wins	1 loss
By knockout	0	1
By submission	0	0
By decision	0	0
Draws	0	
No contests	0	

Res.	Record	Opponent	Method	Event	Date	Round	Time	Location	Notes
Loss	0–1	(Japan) Kazuyuki Fujita	KO (punch)	K-1 PREMIUM 2004 Dynamite!!	31 December 2004	1	1:07		

Olympic Games
Preceded by Ali Ibrahim	Flagbearer for Egypt; Beijing 2008	Succeeded by Hesham Mesbah
