= 1997 Mediterranean Games =

13th edition of the Mediterranean Games

XIII Mediterranean Games Bari 1997
- Host city: Bari, Italy
- Nations: 21
- Athletes: 2,956
- Events: 234 in 27 sports
- Opening: 13 June 1997
- Closing: 25 June 1997
- Opened by: Oscar Luigi Scalfaro
- Main venue: Stadio San Nicola

The XIII Mediterranean Games, commonly known as the 1997 Mediterranean Games, were the 13th Mediterranean Games. The Games were held in Bari, Italy, from 13 to 25 June 1997, where 2,956 athletes (2,166 men and 790 women) from 21 countries participated. There were a total of 234 medal events from 27 different sports.

== Participating nations ==
The following is a list of nations that participated in the 1997 Mediterranean Games:

- Albania (108)
- Algeria (135)
- Bosnia and Herzegovina (90)
- Croatia (226)
- Cyprus (50)
- Egypt (43)
- France (302)
- Greece (306)
- Italy (410)
- Lebanon (41)
- Libya (40)
- Malta (15)
- Monaco (13)
- Morocco (83)
- San Marino (37)
- Slovenia (168)
- Spain (338)
- Syria (27)
- Tunisia (74)
- Turkey (251)
- FR Yugoslavia (199)

== Sports ==
- Artistic gymnastics
- Athletics
- Basketball
- Bowls
- Boxing
- Canoeing
- Cycling
- Diving
- Equestrian
- Fencing
- Football
- Golf
- Handball
- Judo
- Karate
- Rowing
- Rhythmic gymnastics
- Sailing
- Shooting
- Swimming
- Table tennis
- Tennis
- Volleyball
- Water polo
- Weightlifting
- Wrestling

== Medal table ==
* Host nation (Italy)

| Rank | Nation | Gold | Silver | Bronze | Total |
|---|---|---|---|---|---|
| 1 | Italy* | 76 | 62 | 55 | 193 |
| 2 | France | 55 | 44 | 47 | 146 |
| 3 | Turkey | 28 | 16 | 21 | 65 |
| 4 | Greece | 19 | 22 | 21 | 62 |
| 5 | Spain | 18 | 30 | 47 | 95 |
| 6 | Croatia | 6 | 16 | 10 | 32 |
| 7 | Algeria | 6 | 8 | 8 | 22 |
| 8 | Slovenia | 5 | 8 | 10 | 23 |
| 9 | Yugoslavia (FR Yugoslavia) | 5 | 4 | 13 | 22 |
| 10 | Morocco | 5 | 4 | 9 | 18 |
| 11 | Egypt | 3 | 6 | 10 | 19 |
| 12 | Tunisia | 2 | 3 | 9 | 14 |
| 13 | Syria | 2 | 1 | 2 | 5 |
| 14 | Cyprus | 0 | 3 | 4 | 7 |
| 15 | Albania | 0 | 1 | 1 | 2 |
| 15 | Bosnia and Herzegovina | 0 | 1 | 1 | 2 |
| 15 | Malta | 0 | 1 | 1 | 2 |
| 18 | San Marino | 0 | 1 | 0 | 1 |
| Totals (18 entries) | | 230 | 231 | 269 | 730 |
