= Marek Švec (wrestler) =

Czech wrestler (born 1973)

Personal information
- Nationality: Czech Republic
- Born: 17 February 1973 (age 53) Havlíčkův Brod, Czechoslovakia
- Height: 1.86 m (6 ft 1 in)
- Weight: 96 kg (212 lb)

Sport
- Sport: Wrestling
- Event: Greco-Roman
- Club: PSK Olymp Praha (CZE)
- Coached by: Ervin Varga
Medal record
Men's Greco-Roman wrestling
Representing Czech Republic
Olympic Games
Bronze medal – third place	2008 Beijing	96 kg
World Championships
Silver medal – second place	1998 Gävle	97 kg
Silver medal – second place	2006 Guangzhou	96 kg
Bronze medal – third place	2007 Baku	96 kg
Bronze medal – third place	2009 Vilnius	96 kg
European Championships
Bronze medal – third place	2004 Haparanda	96 kg
Bronze medal – third place	2006 Moscow	96 kg

Marek Švec (Czech pronunciation: [ˈmarɛk ˈʃvɛts]; born 17 February 1973 in Havlíčkův Brod) is an amateur Greco-Roman wrestler from the Czech Republic. He is a three-time Olympian, and also, a multiple-time medalist at both the World and European Championships. He also won the bronze medal at the 2008 Summer Olympics.

== Wrestling career ==
Švec, a native of Havlíčkův Brod from the former Czechoslovakia, started wrestling when he was a teenager, and was later admitted to PSK Olymp Praha, one of the most prominent wrestling clubs in the capital Prague, under his coach Ervin Varga. He eventually made his international debut in wrestling by competing in the heavyweight division at the 1994 European Championships, where he finished in fourteenth place. At the onset of his career, Svec struggled to manage his performance in front of the field, as he frequently placed below top-ten places in most of his qualifying tournaments.

In 1998, Svec achieved his first success in wrestling, when he won the silver medal, against Russia's Gogi Koguashvili at the World Championships in Gävle, Sweden. Following his major triumph, he improved further with skill, strategy, and training to qualify for the World and European Championships; however, he suffered numerous setbacks during the competition by placing farther from the medal podium. In 2004, Svec recaptured his success in the men's heavyweight division, after winning the bronze medal at the European Championships in Haparanda, Finland.

After long years of defeat and struggles in the competition, Švec finally managed to repeat his silver medal at the 2006 World Championships in Guangzhou, China, losing out to Estonia's Heiki Nabi by a technical score of 1–3. He also added bronze medals at the European Championships in Moscow and in Vilnius, and at the World Championships in Baku, Azerbaijan.

== Olympic Games ==
In addition to his numerous achievements at both the World and European championships, Švec was one of two Greco-Roman wrestlers from the Czech Republic, along with David Vála, to compete at three Olympic games. He made his official debut at the 1996 Summer Olympics in Atlanta, where he achieved his first top-ten finish by placing eighth for the 90-kg category in men's Greco-Roman wrestling. At the 2000 Summer Olympics, Svec, however, suffered numerous setbacks during the preliminary pool in the men's 97-kg category. He lost to Garrett Lowney of the United States, without receiving any technical score, and Russia's Gogi Koguashvili, who previously defeated him at the World Championships two years before. With two losses and few technical points received in the preliminary pool, Svec dropped to last place, and eighteenth in the overall rankings.

Švec made an eight-year comeback at his third Olympics in Beijing, after winning a silver medal at the World Championships. He qualified for the men's 96-kg category, where he first defeated Kaloyan Dinchev of Bulgaria in the first preliminary round, and upset Georgia's Ramaz Nozadze, silver medalist from Athens, in the quarterfinal round, both with a classification point score of 3–1. Svec eventually fought against Russia's Aslanbek Khushtov in the semi-final round, but the latter received a technical fall to end a match, with an automatic score of 0–5. Having lost in the semi-final round, Švec qualified for the bronze medal bout, but was defeated by Kazakhstan's Asset Mambetov, who earned more points than him in the second period of the match, with a three-point counter takedown, and two-point reverse exposure. Švec originally finished fifth in the overall rankings, tying his place with Han Tae-Young of South Korea.

Asset Mambetov of Kazakhstan originally finished third, however in November 2016, it was announced that he tested positive for stanozolol.

The medals were reawarded by FILA following this decision and Švec was awarded his bronze medal in 2017.
