= Petru Sudureac =

Romanian Greco-Roman wrestler

Personal information
- Full name: Ender Petru Sudureac
- Nationality: Romania
- Born: 23 June 1974 (age 52) Botoşani, Romania
- Height: 1.88 m (6 ft 2 in)
- Weight: 96 kg (212 lb)

Sport
- Style: Greco-Roman
- Club: Dinamo București
- Coach: Nicolae Zamfir
Medal record
Men's Greco-Roman wrestling
Representing Romania
World Championships
| Silver medal – second place | 1995 Atlanta | 90 kg |
European Championships
| Bronze medal – third place | 1999 Budapest | 97 kg |
| Bronze medal – third place | 2001 Istanbul | 97 kg |

Ender Petru Sudureac (born June 23, 1974 in Botoşani) is a retired amateur Romanian Greco-Roman wrestler, who competed in the men's heavyweight category. Sudureac has claimed a silver medal in the 97-kg division at the 1995 World Wrestling Championships, and later represented his nation Romania in two editions of the Olympic Games (2000 and 2004). Throughout his sporting career, Sudureac trained as part of the Greco-Roman wrestling team for Dinamo București, under his coach Nicolae Zamfir.

Sudureac first emerged into the international scene at the 1995 World Wrestling Championships in Atlanta, Georgia, United States, where he won the silver medal on his final match against Turkey's Hakkı Başar in the 90-kg division. He also sought his bid to compete at the 1996 Summer Olympics in the same venue from the World Championships, but was shortlisted.

Destined to fulfill his goal and Olympic dream, Sudureac was selected to be part of the Romanian Olympic team, and ultimately made his official debut at the 2000 Summer Olympics in Sydney, where he competed in the men's heavyweight division (97 kg). He lost his opening match to the formidable Swedish wrestler Mikael Ljungberg, but managed to beat Bulgaria's Ali Mollov in the prelim pool with a score of 6–1. Finishing second in the elimination round and eleventh overall, Sudureac fell short of his chance to put him further into the quarterfinals.

At the 2004 Summer Olympics in Athens, Sudureac qualified for his second team, as a 31-year-old veteran, in the men's 96 kg class by finishing third and receiving a berth from the third Olympic Qualification Tournament in Tashkent, Uzbekistan. Fighting against Iran's Masoud Hashemzadeh and Lithuania's Mindaugas Ežerskis in the prelim pool, Sudureac could not produce a satisfactory record from Sydney, as he lost two straight matches and ended his Olympic campaign with a fifteenth overall finish.
