= Igors Kostins =

Latvian Greco-Roman wrestler (born 1981)

Personal information
- Full name: Igors Kostins
- Nationality: Latvia
- Born: 27 November 1981 (age 44) Rīga, Latvian SSR; Soviet Union
- Height: 1.85 m (6 ft 1 in)
- Weight: 96 kg (212 lb)

Sport
- Style: Greco-Roman
- Club: Daugmale Riga
- Coach: Andrei Trubetzkoi

Igors Kostins (born 27 November 1981 in Rīga) is a retired amateur Latvian Greco-Roman wrestler, who competed in the men's heavyweight category. Kostins represented his nation Latvia at the 2004 Summer Olympics, and has been training for more than 20 years at the Daugmale Wrestling Club in his native hometown Rīga, under his personal coach Andrei Trubetzkoi.

Kostins qualified for the Latvian squad in the men's 96 kg class at the 2004 Summer Olympics in Athens by receiving a berth from the Olympic Qualifying Tournament in Tashkent, Uzbekistan. He received two straight losses and a score of two technical points in a preliminary pool match against Uzbekistan's Aleksey Cheglakov and Turkey's Mehmet Özal, who later picked up the bronze medal in the knockout stages, finishing seventeenth out of twenty-two wrestlers.

In 2011, Kostins turned himself professional as a mixed martial arts fighter, and had competed in numerous global tournaments, where he claimed grand slam heavyweight titles and was ranked among 250 wrestlers under the same division. One of his sporting highlights came in a full throttle match against former UFC titleholder Paul Buentello, where Kostins could not produce a stellar fight against the American and consequently, recorded his first ever defeat in sporting career.
