= Pajo Ivošević =

Yugoslav wrestler (born 1968)

Personal information
- Nationality: Serbian
- Born: 18 May 1968 (age 58)

Sport
- Sport: Wrestling

Pajo Ivošević (born 18 May 1968) is a Serbian former wrestler. He competed for Yugoslavia and appeared as one of the Independent Olympic Participants at the 1992 Summer Olympics in the men's Greco-Roman 90 kg.

He was later the head coach of the Serbian wrestling team.
