= Sergey Matviyenko =

Kazakhstani wrestler (born 1972)

Personal information
- Nationality: Kazakhstani
- Born: 3 June 1972 (age 54)

Sport
- Sport: Wrestling

Sergey Matviyenko (born 3 June 1972) is a Kazakhstani wrestler. He competed at the 1996 Summer Olympics and the 2000 Summer Olympics.
