= Mirko Englich =

German Greco-Roman wrestler

Personal information
- Born: 28 August 1978 (age 47) Witten, West Germany
- Height: 1.85 m (6 ft 1 in)
- Weight: 102 kg (225 lb)

Sport
- Sport: Wrestling
- Event: Greco-Roman
- Club: 1. SC Luckenwalde; Luckenwalde RSV Hansa 90; Frankfurt Oder
- Coached by: Joern Levermann; Maik Bullmann
Medal record
Men's Greco-Roman wrestling
Representing Germany
Olympic Games
Silver medal – second place	2008 Beijing	96 kg
European Championships
Silver medal – second place	2003 Aschaffenburg	96 kg
Silver medal – second place	2008 Tampere	96 kg

Mirko Englich (born 28 August 1978) is a German Greco-Roman wrestler. He won two silver medals at the European Wrestling Championships in 2003 and 2008. Englich won a silver medal at the 2008 Summer Olympics. He defeated U.S.A's Adam Wheeler in the semi-finals to face Russia's Aslanbek Khushtov.

He was married to national champion Yvonne Englich, and they had two children. She died in 2018 of cancer at age 38.
