= Vello Pärnpuu =

Estonian wrestler (born 1973)

Vello Pärnpuu (born 12 February 1973) is an Estonian wrestler.

== Career ==
He was born in Koonga, Pärnu County. In 1999 he graduated from Estonian Agricultural University.

He began his sporting career in Koonga basic school, coached by Harri Timberg. He has participated in World Wrestling Championships. He is multiple-times Estonian champion.
