= Maik Bullmann =

German Greco-Roman wrestler

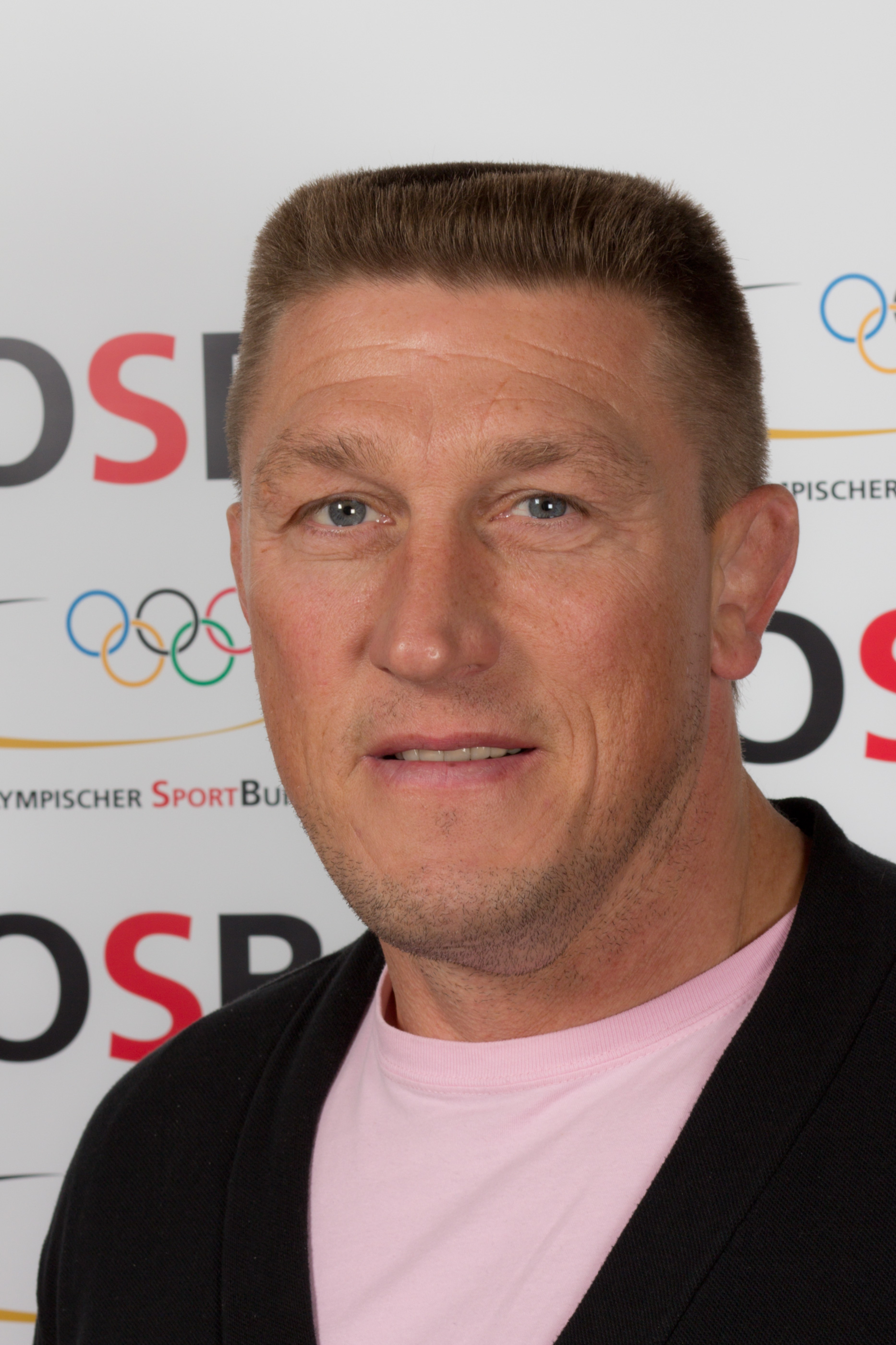
- Bullmann in 2012

Personal information
- Born: 25 April 1967 (age 59) Frankfurt an der Oder, East Germany
- Height: 1.87 m (6 ft 2 in)
- Weight: 96 kg (212 lb)

Sport
- Sport: Wrestling
- Event: Greco-Roman
- Club: 1. SC Luckenwalde
- Coached by: Guenter Reichelt
Medal record
Men's Greco-Roman wrestling
Representing Germany
Olympic Games
Gold medal – first place	1992 Barcelona	90 kg
Bronze medal – third place	1996 Atlanta	90 kg
World Championships
Gold medal – first place	1991 Varna	90 kg
Silver medal – second place	1993 Stockholm	90 kg
Bronze medal – third place	1994 Tampere	90 kg
European Championships
Bronze medal – third place	1991 Aschaffenburg	82 kg
Gold medal – first place	1992 Copenhagen	82 kg
Gold medal – first place	1993 Istanbul	82 kg
Gold medal – first place	1994 Athens	82 kg
Silver medal – second place	1997 Kouvola	85 kg
Representing East Germany
World Championships
Gold medal – first place	1989 Martigny	90 kg
Gold medal – first place	1990 Ostia	90 kg
European Championships
Silver medal – second place	1989 Oulu	90 kg
Silver medal – second place	1990 Poznan	100 kg

Maik Bullmann (also known as Mike Bullmann, born 25 April 1967) is a German Greco-Roman wrestler. He is an Olympic champion and three-time World Champion.

== Olympics ==
Bullmann competed at the 1992 Summer Olympics in Barcelona where he received a gold medal in Greco-Roman wrestling, the light heavyweight class.

He received a bronze medal at the 1996 Summer Olympics in Atlanta.

== World championships ==
Bullmann won a gold medal at the 1989 World Wrestling Championships, and again in 1990 and in 1991.

== Awards ==
He was awarded the Bambi prize in 1992.
