= Park Woo =

South Korean wrestler (born 1972)

Personal information
- Nationality: South Korean
- Born: 25 October 1972 (age 53)

Sport
- Sport: Wrestling

Park Woo (born 25 October 1972) is a South Korean wrestler. He competed in the men's Greco-Roman 97 kg at the 2000 Summer Olympics.
