= Urs Bürgler =

Swiss wrestler

Personal information
- Nationality: Swiss
- Born: 23 December 1971 (age 54)

Sport
- Sport: Wrestling

Urs Bürgler (born 23 December 1971) is a Swiss wrestler. He competed at the 1996 Summer Olympics and the 2000 Summer Olympics.
