= Aslanbek Khushtov =

Russian wrestler (born 1980)

Medal record

Men's Greco-Roman wrestling

Representing Russia

Olympic Games
Gold medal – first place	2008 Beijing	96 kg

World Championships
Bronze medal – third place	2009 Herning	96 kg
Bronze medal – third place	2010 Moscow	96 kg

European Championships
Gold medal – first place	2008 Tampere	96 kg
Gold medal – first place	2009 Vilnius	96 kg
Gold medal – first place	2010 Baku	96 kg

Aslanbek Vitalievich Khushtov (Russian: Асланбек Витальевич Хуштов; born 1 July 1980 in Beloglinka, Kabardino-Balkarian ASSR) is a Russian wrestler, who has won a gold medal in the 2008 Summer Olympics. Khushtov is a member of the Parliament of Kabardino-Balkarian Republic of the 4th convocation.
