= Andrzej Wroński =

Polish wrestler (born 1965)

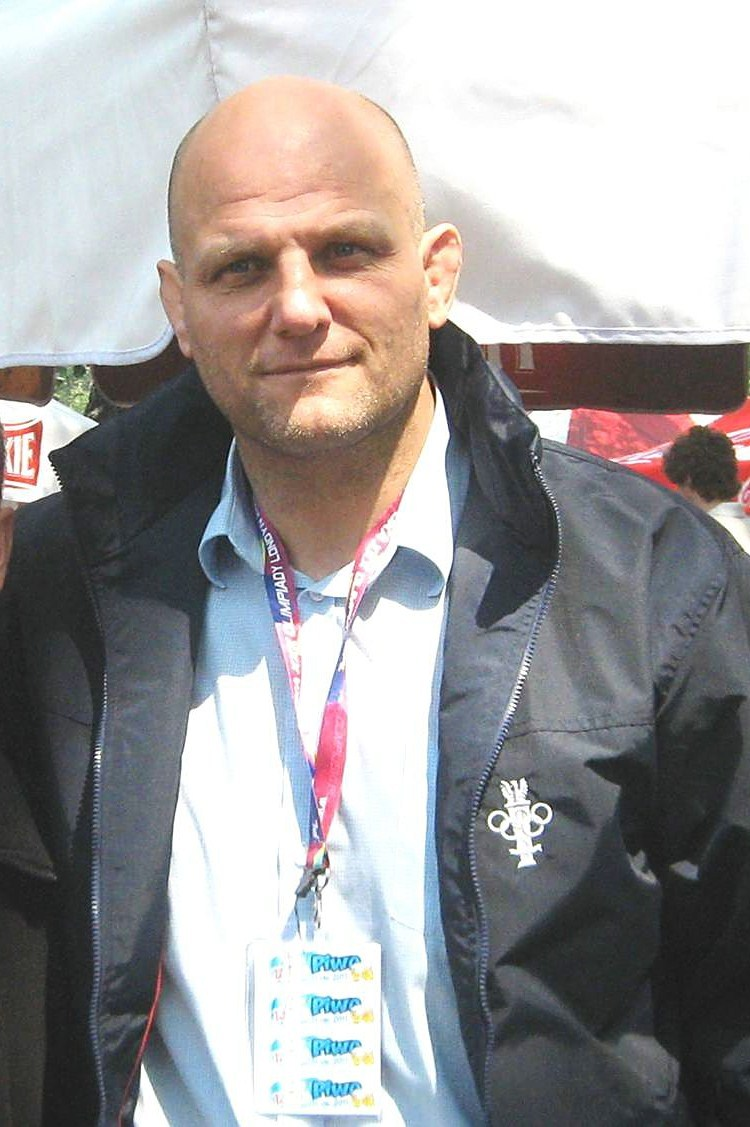
- Andrzej Wroński

Medal record

Men's Greco-Roman wrestling

Representing Poland
| Event | 1st | 2nd | 3rd |
|---|---|---|---|
| Olympic Games | 2 | 0 | 0 |
| World Championships | 1 | 1 | 2 |
| European Championships | 3 | 0 | 2 |
| Total | 6 | 1 | 4 |

Olympic Games
| Gold medal – first place | 1988 Seoul | Heavyweight |
| Gold medal – first place | 1996 Atlanta | Heavyweight |

World Championships
| Gold medal – first place | 1994 Tampere | 100 kg |
| Silver medal – second place | 1999 Athens | 97 kg |
| Bronze medal – third place | 1993 Stockholm | 100 kg |
| Bronze medal – third place | 1997 Wrocław | 97 kg |

European Championships
| Gold medal – first place | 1989 Oulu | 100 kg |
| Gold medal – first place | 1992 Copenhagen | 100 kg |
| Gold medal – first place | 1994 Athens | 100 kg |
| Bronze medal – third place | 1990 Poznań | 100 kg |
| Bronze medal – third place | 1996 Budapest | 100 kg |

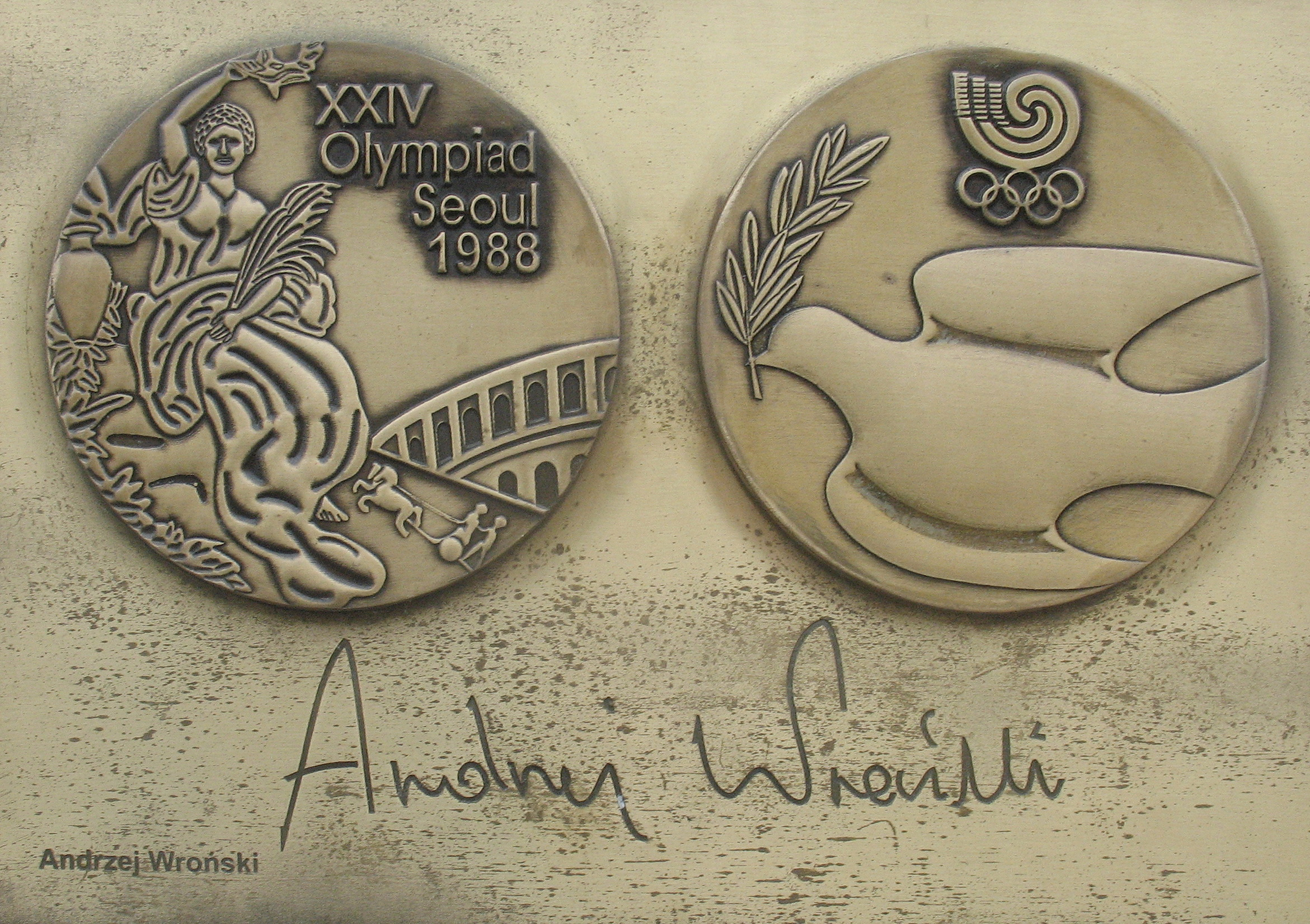
Copy of A. Wronski medal and autograph in Alei Gwiazd Sportu w Dziwnowie

Andrzej Adam Wroński (born 8 October 1965 in Kartuzy, Pomorskie) is a Polish wrestler (Greco-Roman style) who has won two Olympic gold medals. He carried the flag at the opening ceremony of the 2000 Summer Olympics in Sydney, Australia.

== Mixed martial arts record ==
Professional record breakdown
| 1 match | 0 wins | 1 loss |
| By knockout | 0 | 1 |
| By submission | 0 | 0 |
| By decision | 0 | 0 |

| Res. | Record | Opponent | Method | Event | Date | Round | Time | Location | Notes |
|---|---|---|---|---|---|---|---|---|---|
| Loss | 0–1 | (Poland) Paweł Nastula | TKO (punches) | Wieczór Mistrzów | 20 August 2011 | 1 | 1:09 | Koszalin, Poland | |

For his sport achievements, he received the Order of Polonia Restituta:
Knight's Cross (5th Class) in 1988,
Officer's Cross (4th Class) in 1995,
Commander's Cross (3rd Class) in 1996.

Olympic Games
| Preceded by Rafał Szukała | Flagbearer for Poland; 2000 Sydney | Succeeded by Bartosz Kizierowski |
