= Davyd Saldadze =

Uzbekistani wrestler

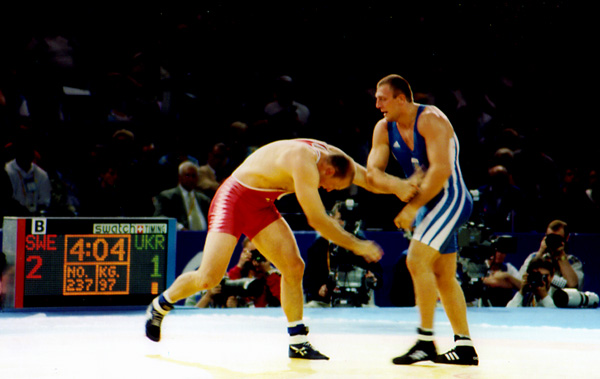
- Saldadze and Mikael Ljungberg at the 2000 Olympics

Personal information
- Full name: Davyd Tengizovich Saldadze
- Born: 15 February 1978 (age 48) Kutaisi, Imereti, Georgia
- Height: 185 cm (6 ft 1 in)
Medal record
Men's Greco-Roman wrestling
Representing Ukraine
Olympic Games
Silver medal – second place	2000 Sydney	97 kg
World Championships
Bronze medal – third place	1998 Gävle	97 kg
European Championships
Bronze medal – third place	2002 Seinäjoki	96 kg
Bronze medal – third place	2003 Belgrade	96 kg
Representing Uzbekistan
Asian Games
Bronze medal – third place	2010 Guangzhou	96 kg
Asian Championships
Bronze medal – third place	2008 Jeju	120 kg

Davyd Tengizovich Saldadze (born 15 February 1978) is an Uzbekistani wrestler of Georgian origin, he also wrestled for Ukraine and won the Silver medal in the Men's Greco-Roman 97kg in the 2000 Summer Olympics in Sydney for Ukraine. He was born in Kutaisi, Georgian SSR and is the brother of Georgiy Saldadze.
