= Mikael Ljungberg =

Swedish wrestler (1970–2004)

Medal record

Men's Greco-Roman wrestling

Representing Sweden

Olympic Games
Gold medal – first place	2000 Sydney	97 kg
Bronze medal – third place	1996 Atlanta	97 kg

Mikael Ljungberg (13 June 1970 – 17 November 2004) was a Swedish wrestler from Gothenburg. He competed for Örgryte IS's wrestling section.

Ljungberg was one of the most successful Swedish wrestlers ever. He won World Championship gold medals in 1993 and 1995, European Championship gold medals in 1995 and 1999, and an Olympic gold medal in 2000.

In the summer of 2004, the Complete Book of the Olympics 2004 edition wrongly reported Mikael Ljungberg had been suspended in 1994 for using a banned performance-enhancing drug. This was silently corrected in the 2008 edition of the same book.

Just before his death he was appointed manager of the sport section for the Swedish Wrestling Federation, an office he would have entered on 1 January 2005.

== Death ==
Ljungberg died on 17 November 2004, while receiving care for depression. The cause of death was suicide by hanging.
