= Hakkı Başar =

Turkish sport wrestler (born 1969)

Personal information
- Nationality: Turkish
- Born: 24 September 1969 (age 56) Sakarya, Turkey
- Height: 1.85 m (6 ft 1 in)
- Weight: 97 kg (214 lb)

Sport
- Country: Turkey
- Sport: Wrestling
- Event: Greco-Roman
- Club: İstanbul BB
- Turned pro: 1989
- Coached by: Ata Karataş, İbrahim Yıldırım
- Retired: 2000
Medal record
Men's Greco-Roman wrestling
Representing Turkey
Olympic Games
Silver medal – second place	1992 Barcelona	90 kg
World Championships
Gold medal – first place	1995 Prag	90 kg
European Championships
Gold medal – first place	1997 Quolu	97 kg
Bronze medal – third place	1993 İstanbul	90 kg
Bronze medal – third place	1998 Minsk	90 kg
World Cup
Silver medal – second place	1997 Tehran	97 kg
Mediterranean Games
Gold medal – first place	1991 Languedoc-Roussillon	90 kg
Gold medal – first place	1997 Bari	97 kg

Hakkı Başar (born 24 September 1969) is a Turkish former wrestler. He is Olympic silver medalist in Greco-Roman wrestling in 1992. He also competed at the 1996 and 2000 Olympics. He is the uncle of Metehan Başar and Yunus Emre Başar.

== Wrestling career ==
Başar grew up in Istanbul and only started wrestling at the age of 17 in 1986. He joined the Istanbul wrestling club "Ithisas Spor". He was trained by Ata Karatas at that time. Hakkı rank exclusively in the Greco-Roman style. Later he moved to the club "Böyökzehir Belediye" Istanbul, where the coach Ibrahim Yildirim supervised him. He began his international career at the age of 18 with a victory at the 1988 Balkan Games in Romania. He wrestled at middleweight at the time. In 1989 he finished 7th at the Junior World Championships in Budapest. He then competed in several international championships in 1990 and 1991, but could not yet place himself in the front field. However, the Turkish Wrestling Federation remained loyal to him and also nominated Hakkı for the 1992 Olympic Games, because it was recognized that there was a lot of potential in him.

In fact, he made his breakthrough at the 1992 Olympic Games in Barcelona. He provided excellent fights in the light heavyweight division, defeated the Russian Gogi Koguashvili and in the fight for the gold medal lost only to the German Maik Bullmann. The silver medal was the reward for his good fights.

He also defeated Koguashvili at the 1993 European Championships in Istanbul, but this time he failed to beat the Swedish surprise Jörgen Olsson, but still won the bronze medal in the light heavyweight division.

In 1994, he suffered a setback in terms of performance, when he took only 13th place at the European Championships in Athens and only 15th place at the World Championships in Tampere. At the 1995 European Championships in Besançon, he competed in the heavyweight division, but could not prevail there and finished only seventh.

At the World Championship in 1995, he then achieved his first major victory. He became the world light heavyweight champion. His main rival Gogi Koguashvili was eliminated even before the final, in which Hakkı safely beat Petru Sudureac from Romania.

In 1996, Hakkı was again less successful. After a 12th place at the European Championships, he still finished 5th at the Olympic Games in Atlanta in the light heavyweight category.

The year 1997 brought a weight class reclassification by the international wrestling federation FILA. Light heavyweight and heavyweight, previously up to 90 kg and 100 kg body weight, were merged into a new light heavyweight weight class, which went up to 97 kg body weight. The former light heavyweight and the former heavyweight now met in this weight class. The competition in this new weight class was therefore very high. Nevertheless, Hakkı achieved great success in the spring of 1997, when he became European champion in Kouvola / Finland, where, however, some of the previous stars of the old weight classes were missing. He defeated Anatoly Fedorenko of Belarus in the final. In autumn, it was only enough to finish 10th at the World Championships in Wroclaw, where for the first time all the cracks from the former weight classes were at the start.

After all, he won another bronze medal at the 1998 European Championships in Minsk. In the following years he achieved some good placings at international championships, but he did not win a medal anymore. The end of his career was disappointing for him, namely the third participation in the Olympic Games in 2000 in Sydney. He took only 16th place there.

After the end of his active career, Başar completed a coaching education and is now a coach for the Greco-Roman style active in the Turkish Wrestling Federation. He also runs a sports and fitness facility.
