= Gogi Koguashvili =

Soviet-Russian wrestler (born 1974)

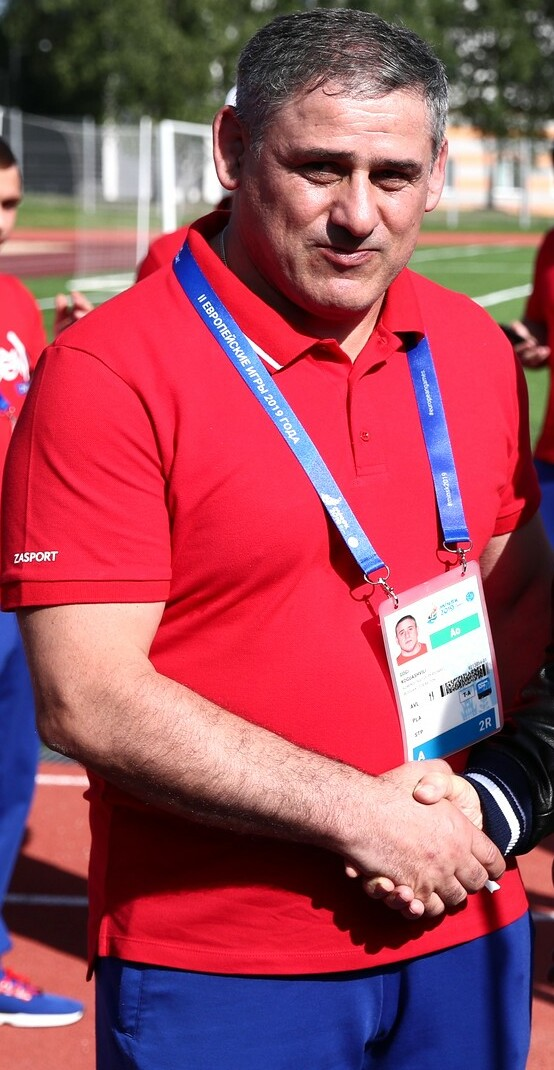

Medal record

Men's Greco-Roman wrestling

Representing the Unified Team

Olympic Games
Bronze medal – third place	1992 Barcelona	90 kg

Representing Russia

World Championships
Gold medal – first place	1993 Stockholm	90 kg
Gold medal – first place	1994 Tampere	90 kg
Gold medal – first place	1997 Wrocław	97 kg
Gold medal – first place	1998 Gävle	97 kg
Gold medal – first place	1999 Athens	97 kg
Bronze medal – third place	1995 Prague	90 kg

Gogi Murmanovich Koguashvili (Russian: Гоги Мурманович Когуашвили; born 26 April 1969 in Kutaisi) is a Soviet and Russian former wrestler of Georgian descent who competed in the 1992 Summer Olympics, in the 1996 Summer Olympics, in the 2000 Summer Olympics, and in the 2004 Summer Olympics. He is the head coach of the Russian Greco-Roman wrestling national team.
