= Masoud Hashemzadeh =

Iranian wrestler (born 1981)

Personal information
- Born: 1981 (age 44–45) Mianeh, Iran
Masoud Hashemzadeh
Medal record
Men's Greco-Roman wrestling
Representing Iran
Asian Games
Silver medal – second place	2006 Doha	96 kg
Bronze medal – third place	2002 Busan	96 kg
Asian Championships
Gold medal – first place	2008 Jeju City	120 kg
Gold medal – first place	2009 Pattaya	120 kg
Silver medal – second place	2003 New Delhi	96 kg
Bronze medal – third place	2005 Wuhan	96 kg

Masoud Hashemzadeh (Persian: مسعود هاشم زاده born 21 September 1981), is an Iranian wrestler. He has competed in two Olympics but is yet to win a medal.
