= Sergey Lishtvan =

Belarusian Greco-Roman wrestler (born 1970)

Medal record

Men's Greco-Roman wrestling

Representing Belarus

Olympic Games
Silver medal – second place	1996 Atlanta	100 kg

Sergey Lishtvan (born November 5, 1970) is a Belarusian wrestler, born in Minsk. At the 1996 Summer Olympics he won the silver medal in the men's Greco-Roman Heavyweight (90–100 kg) category. He also competed at the 2000 and 2004 Summer Olympics, but could not win a medal.
