= Ramaz Nozadze =

Georgian wrestler (born 1981)

Medal record

Men's Greco-Roman wrestling

Representing Georgia

Olympic Games
Silver medal – second place	2004 Athens	96 kg

World Championships
Gold medal – first place	2007 Baku	96 kg
Bronze medal – third place	2003 New York	96 kg

European Championships
Gold medal – first place	2003 Belgrade	96 kg
Gold medal – first place	2007 Sofia	96 kg
Bronze medal – third place	2008 Tampere	96 kg

Ramaz Nozadze (born 16 October 1981, in Tbilisi) is a Georgian wrestler who competed in the Men's Greco-Roman 96 kg at the 2004 Summer Olympics and won the silver medal. He lost in the final match to Egypt's Karam Gaber by (1–12).
