= Garrett Lowney =

American Greco-Roman wrestler

Personal information
- Full name: Steven Garrett Lowney
- Born: October 3, 1979 (age 46) Appleton, Wisconsin, U.S.
- Height: 6 ft 0 in (183 cm)
- Weight: 97 kg (214 lb)

Sport
- Country: United States
- Sport: Wrestling
- Events: Greco-Roman and Folkstyle
- College team: Minnesota
- Club: Minnesota Storm
- Team: USA
Medal record
Men's Greco-Roman wrestling
Representing the United States
Olympic Games
Bronze medal – third place	2000 Sydney	97 kg
Junior World Championships
Gold medal – first place	1999 Romania	97 kg
Collegiate Wrestling
Representing the Minnesota Golden Gophers
NCAA Division I Championships
Bronze medal – third place	2001 Iowa City	285 lb

Steven Garrett Lowney (born October 3, 1979) is an American former Greco-Roman Olympic wrestler.

Lowney wrestled for the University of Minnesota under coach J Robinson. While at the University of Minnesota, he received his B.A. in Marketing at the Carlson School of Management, won a bronze medal at the 2000 Summer Olympics in Sydney, and ran a youth instruction company to support his way through college.

After graduation, he would also become a member of the 2004 Summer Olympic team in Athens. He attended Freedom High School in Freedom, Wisconsin.
