= Konstantinos Thanos =

Greek wrestler (born 1973)

Personal information
- Born: 1 January 1973 (age 53)

Sport
- Country: Greece
- Sport: Amateur wrestling

Konstantinos Thanos (born 1 January 1973) is a Greek wrestler who participated in the 2000 Summer Olympics in Sydney.
