= Asset Mambetov =

Kazakhstani wrestler (born 1982)

Medal record

Men's Greco-Roman wrestling

Representing Kazakhstan

Olympic Games
Disqualified	2008 Beijing	96 kg

Asian Games
Silver medal – second place	2010 Guangzhou	-96 kg

Asset Sekenovich Mambetov (born 10 June 1982, in Altyn-Shoky, Kazakhstan) is a Kazakh wrestler, who initially won a bronze medal at the 2008 Summer Olympics. He is a trainer for heavyweight wrestlers in Kazakhstan. On 17 November 2016 the IOC disqualified him from the 2008 Olympic Games, stripped his Olympic medal and struck his results from the record for failing a drugs test in a re-analysis of his doping sample from 2008.
