= Mehmet Özal =

Turkish wrestler (born 1978)

Personal information
- Born: 31 October 1978 (age 47) Ankara- Turkey
Medal record
Men's Greco-Roman wrestling
Representing Turkey
Olympic Games
Bronze medal – third place	2004 Athens	96 kg
World Championships
Gold medal – first place	2002 Moscow	96 kg
Bronze medal – third place	2001 Patras	97 kg
European Championships
Bronze medal – third place	2000 Moscow	97 kg
Military World Games
Gold medal – first place	2007 Hyderabad	96 kg
World Military Championships
Gold medal – first place	2000 Camp Lejeune	97 kg
Mediterranean Games
Bronze medal – third place	2005 Almería	97 kg

Mehmet Özal (born 31 October 1978 in Ankara, Turkey) is a Turkish wrestler in Greco-Roman style. He is a member of the İstanbul Büyükşehir Belediyesi S.K.

He competed in the men's Greco-Roman 96 kg at the 2004 Summer Olympics and won the bronze medal.

At the World Championships he has won a bronze and a gold medal, in 2001 and 2002, respectively. He also won a bronze medal at the 2005 Mediterranean Games.

== Achievements ==
- 1998 World University Championships in Ankara, Turkey - bronze (97 kg)
- 2000 European Championships in Moscow, Russia - bronze (97 kg)
- 2000 World Military Championships in Camp Lejeune, NC, U.S. - gold (97 kg)
- 2000 World University Championships in Tokyo, Japan - bronze (97 kg)
- 2001 European Championships in Istanbul, Turkey - 5th (97 kg)
- 2001 World Cup in Levallois-Perret, Paris, France - 4th (97 kg)
- 2001 World Championships in Patras, Greece - bronze (97 kg)
- 2002 European Championships in Seinäjoki, Finland - 14th (96 kg)
- 2002 World Championships in Moscow, Russia - gold (96 kg)
- 2003 European Championships in Belgrade, Serbia - 9th (96 kg)
- 2003 World Championships in Créteil, Paris, France - 14th (96 kg)
- 2004 Olympics in Athens, Greece - bronze (96 kg)
- 2004 European Championships in Haparanda, Finland - 6th (96 kg)
- 2005 Mediterranean Games in Almeria, Spain - bronze (96 kg)
- 2007 Military Olympics in Hyderabad, India - gold (96 kg)

Olympic Games
Preceded by Ali Enver Adakan	Flagbearer for Turkey; Beijing 2008	Succeeded by Neslihan Demir Darnel
