= Ali Mollov =

Bulgarian wrestler

Personal information
- Nationality: Bulgarian
- Born: 31 December 1970 (age 55) Troyan, Bulgaria

Sport
- Sport: Wrestling

Ali Mollov (born 31 December 1970) is a Bulgarian wrestler. He competed in the men's Greco-Roman 97 kg at the 2000 Summer Olympics.
