= Mindaugas Ežerskis =

Lithuanian wrestler (born 1977)

Personal information
- Nationality: Lithuania
- Born: 2 August 1977 (age 49) Šiauliai, Lithuanian SSR, Soviet Union
- Height: 1.86 m (6 ft 1 in)
- Weight: 96 kg (212 lb)

Sport
- Sport: Wrestling
- Event: Greco-Roman
- Club: SK Hallbergmos (GER)
- Coached by: Ruslan Vartanov
Medal record
Men's Greco-Roman wrestling
Representing Lithuania
World Wrestling Championships
Silver medal – second place	2007 Baku	96 kg
European Wrestling Championships
Silver medal – second place	2009 Vilnius	96 kg
Silver medal – second place	2012 Belgrade	96 kg
Bronze medal – third place	2005 Varna	96 kg

Mindaugas Ežerskis (born 2 August 1977 in Tauragė) is a three-time Olympic wrestler from Lithuania, who competed for the heavyweight division and wrestling coach. He also won the bronze medal for his category at the 2005 European Wrestling Championships in Varna, Bulgaria, and silver at the 2007 World Wrestling Championships in Baku, Azerbaijan, losing out to Georgia's Ramaz Nozadze.

At the Olympics, Ežerskis was eliminated in a pool of wrestlers for the heavyweight division in Sydney, and in Athens. With his poor Olympic performance at two previous games, he managed to improve his skills, tactics, and training, and fought successfully against his opponents at various wrestling tournaments. After winning a silver medal at the World Championships in 2007, Ežerskis received an automatic qualifying place at the 2008 Summer Olympics in Beijing, and competed for the men's under-96 kg category in Greco-Roman wrestling. He was eliminated in the first official round of the competition, after being defeated by Russia's Aslanbek Khushtov, with a technical score of 1–3. Because his opponent advanced successfully into the final round, Ežerskis automatically qualified for the bronze medal bouts by competing in the repechage round. However, he was lost to Kazakhstan's Asset Mambetov, with a technical score of 4–5, finishing only in seventh place.

Ežerskis is currently one of the coaches of the national Greco-Roman wrestling team.
