= Han Tae-young =

South Korean wrestler

Personal information
- Born: 4 September 1979 (age 46) Seoul, South Korea
- Height: 1.9 m (6 ft 3 in)
- Weight: 96 kg (212 lb)

Sport
- Country: South Korea
- Sport: Wrestling
Medal record
Han Tae-young
Medal record
Representing South Korea
Men's Greco-Roman wrestling
Gold medal – first place	2006 Doha	96 kg

Han Tae Young (born 4 September 1979) is a Korean Greco-Roman wrestler. He was born in Seoul, South Korea. Han won gold medal at 2006 Asian Games in Doha. He also competed in 2008 Summer Olympics at Beijing.
