= 2009 World Wrestling Championships – Men's freestyle 60 kg =

Men's freestyle 60 kg at the 2009 World Championships
- Venue: Messecenter Herning
- Dates: 22 September 2009
- Competitors: 32 from 32 nations

Medalists
gold medal	Besik Kudukhov	Russia
silver medal	Zelimkhan Huseynov	Azerbaijan
bronze medal	Dilshod Mansurov	Uzbekistan
bronze medal	Vasyl Fedoryshyn	Ukraine

The men's freestyle 60 kilograms is a competition featured at the 2009 World Wrestling Championships, and was held at the Messecenter Herning exhibition center in Herning, Denmark on September 22.

This freestyle wrestling competition consists of a single-elimination tournament, with a repechage used to determine the winner of two bronze medals.

== Results ==
Legend

- F — Won by fall

=== Final ===
Final
Zelimkhan Huseynov (AZE)	0	0
Besik Kudukhov (RUS)	2	4

=== Top half ===
Round of 32
Adam Blok (POL)	0	3	1
Artur Arakelyan (ARM)	1	0	2
Vitaly Koryakin (TJK)	0	2
Zelimkhan Huseynov (AZE)	2	3
Hardeep Singh (IND)	0	4	0
Shogo Maeda (JPN)	2	2	6
César Roberty (VEN)	2	1
Andrejs Vasiļjevs (LAT)	0	1
Dilshod Mansurov (UZB)	4	4
Ling Xuequan (CHN)	0	0
Lee Seung-chul (KOR)	2	4
Hakkı Gürel (TUR)	0	1
Anatolie Guidea (BUL)	3^{F}
Shawn Bunch (USA)	1
Maikel Pérez (CUB)	3	5	5
Didier Païs (FRA)	5	2	0

Round of 16
Artur Arakelyan (ARM)	0	0
Zelimkhan Huseynov (AZE)	3	1
Shogo Maeda (JPN)	1	1
César Roberty (VEN)	0	0
Dilshod Mansurov (UZB)	1	3
Lee Seung-chul (KOR)	0	0
Anatolie Guidea (BUL)	1	0
Maikel Pérez (CUB)	2	2

Quarterfinals
Zelimkhan Huseynov (AZE)	7	4
Shogo Maeda (JPN)	4	1
Dilshod Mansurov (UZB)	1	3
Maikel Pérez (CUB)	0	1

Semifinals
Zelimkhan Huseynov (AZE)	1	6
Dilshod Mansurov (UZB)	0	2

=== Bottom half ===
Round of 32
Malkhaz Zarkua (GEO)	0	2
George Bucur (ROU)	3	3
Jo Tong-hyok (PRK)	0	1
Zhassulan Mukhtarbekuly (KAZ)	7	3
Agustín Sánchez (ESP)	0	0
Vasyl Fedoryshyn (UKR)	3	6
Saeed Azarbayjani (CAN)	1	5
Hassan Madani (EGY)	0	3
Jatinder Rakhra (GBR)	0	0
Besik Kudukhov (RUS)	4	5
Vladimir Gotişan (MDA)	1	0
Morad Mohammadi (IRI)	3	2
Bazar Bazarguruev (KGZ)	1	1
Ramazan Kambarow (TKM)	0	0
Ganzorigiin Mandakhnaran (MGL)	1	0
Mahamedkamil Mahamedau (BLR)	2	1

Round of 16
George Bucur (ROU)	0	3	1
Zhassulan Mukhtarbekuly (KAZ)	6	0	2
Vasyl Fedoryshyn (UKR)	1	1
Saeed Azarbayjani (CAN)	0	1
Besik Kudukhov (RUS)	1	2
Morad Mohammadi (IRI)	0	0
Bazar Bazarguruev (KGZ)	2	0	1
Mahamedkamil Mahamedau (BLR)	0	1	0

Quarterfinals
Zhassulan Mukhtarbekuly (KAZ)	0	0
Vasyl Fedoryshyn (UKR)	1	1
Besik Kudukhov (RUS)	1	1
Bazar Bazarguruev (KGZ)	0	0

Semifinals
Vasyl Fedoryshyn (UKR)	0	1	0
Besik Kudukhov (RUS)	1	0	1

=== Repechage ===
Repechage round 1
Vitaly Koryakin (TJK)	0	3	0
Artur Arakelyan (ARM)	2	1	1
Jatinder Rakhra (GBR)	0	0
Morad Mohammadi (IRI)	3	3

Repechage round 2
Artur Arakelyan (ARM)	4	5	3
Shogo Maeda (JPN)	1	6	3
Morad Mohammadi (IRI)	1	0	2
Bazar Bazarguruev (KGZ)	0	1	0

Bronze medals
Shogo Maeda (JPN)	1	2	0
Dilshod Mansurov (UZB)	0	4	1
Morad Mohammadi (IRI)	0	0
Vasyl Fedoryshyn (UKR)	1	2
