= 2007 World Wrestling Championships – Men's freestyle 60 kg =

Men's freestyle 60 kg at the 2007 World Championships
- Venue: Heydar Aliyev Sports and Concert Complex
- Dates: 19 September 2007
- Competitors: 43 from 43 nations

Medalists
gold medal	Mavlet Batirov	Russia
silver medal	Anatolie Guidea	Bulgaria
bronze medal	Bazar Bazarguruev	Kyrgyzstan
bronze medal	Sahit Prizreni	Albania

The men's freestyle 60 kilograms is a competition featured at the 2007 World Wrestling Championships, and was held at the Heydar Aliyev Sports and Concert Complex in Baku, Azerbaijan on 19 September 2007.

== Results ==
Legend

- F — Won by fall

=== Finals ===
Semifinals			Final
Mavlet Batirov (RUS)	3	2
Tevfik Odabaşı (TUR)	0	0	Mavlet Batirov (RUS)	1	1
Sahit Prizreni (ALB)	0	1	Anatolie Guidea (BUL)	0	0
Anatolie Guidea (BUL)	2	4

=== Top half ===
==== Section 1 ====
Round of 64

Round of 32
Ri Yong-chol (PRK)	7	1
Alexander Kropf (GER)	0	0
Vasyl Fedoryshyn (UKR)	3	3
Sengedorjiin Sükhbaatar (MGL)	0	0
Bazar Bazarguruev (KGZ)	3	6
Cory O'Brien (AUS)	0	0
Andrei Prepeliţă (MDA)	0	0
Mavlet Batirov (RUS)	2	4

Round of 16
Ri Yong-chol (PRK)	3	0	1
Vasyl Fedoryshyn (UKR)	0	3	7^{F}
Bazar Bazarguruev (KGZ)	0	0
Mavlet Batirov (RUS)	1	1

Quarterfinals
Vasyl Fedoryshyn (UKR)	0	0
Mavlet Batirov (RUS)	1	3

==== Section 2 ====
Round of 64

Round of 32
Yogeshwar Dutt (IND)	4	7
Hussain Gowdooei (QAT)	0	0
Tevfik Odabaşı (TUR)	3	6
Aleksandrs Truškins (LAT)	2	0
Vytas Čumakovas (LTU)	6	7
Nguyễn Thế Anh (VIE)	0	0
Malkhaz Kurdiani (GEO)	1	0	3
Ikhtiyor Navruzov (UZB)	0	3	2

Round of 16
Yogeshwar Dutt (IND)	5	1
Tevfik Odabaşı (TUR)	8	8
Vytas Čumakovas (LTU)	1	0
Malkhaz Kurdiani (GEO)	2	1

Quarterfinals
Tevfik Odabaşı (TUR)	2	2
Malkhaz Kurdiani (GEO)	1	0

=== Bottom half ===
==== Section 3 ====
Round of 64
Aliaksandr Karnitski (BLR)	0	0
Morad Mohammadi (IRI)	2	1
Namig Sevdimov (AZE)	0	0
Murad Ramazanov (MKD)	2	1
Aldo Parimango (PER)	0	0
Ali Mohammed (IRQ)	1	1

Round of 32
Sahit Prizreni (ALB)	1	1
Mike Zadick (USA)	1	0
Armen Karapetyan (ARM)	3	3
Viorel Etko (GBR)	0	0
Saeed Azarbayjani (CAN)	0	1
Morad Mohammadi (IRI)	2	1
Murad Ramazanov (MKD)	1	5
Ali Mohammed (IRQ)	0	0

Round of 16
Sahit Prizreni (ALB)	3	1
Armen Karapetyan (ARM)	2	0
Morad Mohammadi (IRI)	0	0
Murad Ramazanov (MKD)	2	1

Quarterfinals
Sahit Prizreni (ALB)	3	1
Murad Ramazanov (MKD)	1	0

==== Section 4 ====
Round of 64
Kenichi Yumoto (JPN)	0	5	3
Samat Zhakupov (KAZ)	1	0	3
Luis Portillo (ESA)	0	2
Vitaly Koryakin (TJK)	3	5
Hassan Madani (EGY)	1	5
Cho Hyun-wan (KOR)	0	1
Pius Zberg (SUI)	0	0
Anatolie Guidea (BUL)	7	6
Antonio González (PAN)	0	0
Adam Blok (POL)	7	5^{F}
Themis Iakovidis (GRE)	6	6^{F}
José Tomás López (NCA)	0	0
Petru Toarcă (ROU)	0	0
Gergõ Wöller (HUN)	1	2
Qin He (CHN)	1	6
Didier Païs (FRA)	0	0

Round of 32
Samat Zhakupov (KAZ)	0	1	1
Vitaly Koryakin (TJK)	6	0	0
Hassan Madani (EGY)	2	2
Anatolie Guidea (BUL)	2	5
Adam Blok (POL)	2	1
Themis Iakovidis (GRE)	3	4
Gergõ Wöller (HUN)	0	0
Qin He (CHN)	2	1

Round of 16
Samat Zhakupov (KAZ)	0	1	0
Anatolie Guidea (BUL)	1	0	5
Themis Iakovidis (GRE)	1	7	4
Qin He (CHN)	4	6	12

Quarterfinals
Anatolie Guidea (BUL)	3	6
Qin He (CHN)	0	0

=== Repechage ===
Repechage round 1
Pius Zberg (SUI)	0	0
Hassan Madani (EGY)	1	4

Repechage round 2
Andrei Prepeliţă (MDA)	0	1	1
Bazar Bazarguruev (KGZ)	1	0	1
Hassan Madani (EGY)	7	1	1
Samat Zhakupov (KAZ)	0	3	2

Repechage round 3
Bazar Bazarguruev (KGZ)	0	1	1
Vasyl Fedoryshyn (UKR)	3	0	0
Samat Zhakupov (KAZ)	1	0
Qin He (CHN)	2	1

Bronze medals
Bazar Bazarguruev (KGZ)	0	3	2
Tevfik Odabaşı (TUR)	3	1	0
Qin He (CHN)	0	1	0
Sahit Prizreni (ALB)	1	0	2
