= 2011 World Wrestling Championships – Men's freestyle 60 kg =

Men's freestyle 60 kg at the 2011 World Championships
- Venue: Sinan Erdem Dome
- Dates: 17 September 2011
- Competitors: 47 from 47 nations

Medalists
gold medal	Besik Kudukhov	Russia
silver medal	Franklin Gómez	Puerto Rico
bronze medal	Kenichi Yumoto	Japan
bronze medal	Dauren Zhumagaziyev	Kazakhstan

The men's freestyle 60 kilograms is a competition featured at the 2011 World Wrestling Championships, and was held at the Sinan Erdem Dome in Istanbul, Turkey on 17 September 2011.

== Results ==
Legend

- F — Won by fall

=== Finals ===
Semifinals				Final
Didier Païs (FRA)	0	0
Besik Kudukhov (RUS)	1	2		Besik Kudukhov (RUS)	5	1
Franklin Gómez (PUR)	1	0	3	Franklin Gómez (PUR)	0	0
Dauren Zhumagaziyev (KAZ)	1	1	0

=== Top half ===
==== Section 1 ====
Round of 64

Round of 32
Narek Sanoyan (ARM)	0	2
Tim Schleicher (GER)	5	8
Didier Païs (FRA)	7	7
Vincenzo Rizzotto (ITA)	0	3
Christopher Reyes (NCA)	0	0
Bilel Douissa (TUN)	7	6
Guillermo Torres (MEX)	1	1
Reece Humphrey (USA)	2	2

Round of 16
Tim Schleicher (GER)	1	0
Didier Païs (FRA)	2	1
Bilel Douissa (TUN)	0	0
Reece Humphrey (USA)	6	3^{F}

Quarterfinals
Didier Païs (FRA)	4	3	4
Reece Humphrey (USA)	1	3	0

==== Section 2 ====
Round of 64

Round of 32
Hernán Guzmán (COL)	0	0
Vasyl Fedoryshyn (UKR)	3	8^{F}
Kenichi Yumoto (JPN)	0	3	2
Vladimir Dubov (BUL)	3	2	1
John Pineda (CAN)	0	1	0
Wilfredo Henríquez (VEN)	1	0	2
Luis Portillo (ESA)	0	1
Besik Kudukhov (RUS)	2	4

Round of 16
Vasyl Fedoryshyn (UKR)	0	0
Kenichi Yumoto (JPN)	1	1
Wilfredo Henríquez (VEN)	0	1
Besik Kudukhov (RUS)	1	2

Quarterfinals
Kenichi Yumoto (JPN)	0	0
Besik Kudukhov (RUS)	2	1

=== Bottom half ===
==== Section 3 ====
Round of 64
Victor Ngouema (CGO)	0	0
Bakhram Ermatov (UZB)	6	4^{F}
Aslan Nametidis (GRE)	0	0
Ersin Çetin (TUR)	2	4
Zelimkhan Huseynov (AZE)	7	3
Vytas Čumakovas (LTU)	0	1
Hassan Madani (EGY)	1	3
Agustín Sánchez (ESP)	0	1
Lee Seung-chul (KOR)	2	1
Ganzorigiin Mandakhnaran (MGL)	0	0
Ri Jong-myong (PRK)	1	0	2
Amas Daniel (NGR)	0	3	1
Malkhaz Zarkua (GEO)	0	0
Franklin Gómez (PUR)	4	2

Round of 32
Gao Feng (CHN)	2	2	4^{F}
Bakhram Ermatov (UZB)	1	5	0
Ersin Çetin (TUR)	0	1	0
Zelimkhan Huseynov (AZE)	1	0	5
Hassan Madani (EGY)	0	0
Lee Seung-chul (KOR)	6	1
Ri Jong-myong (PRK)	0	0
Franklin Gómez (PUR)	1	3

Round of 16
Gao Feng (CHN)	4	0	6
Zelimkhan Huseynov (AZE)	1	5	6
Lee Seung-chul (KOR)	0	0
Franklin Gómez (PUR)	2	3

Quarterfinals
Zelimkhan Huseynov (AZE)	1	0	1
Franklin Gómez (PUR)	0	1	2

==== Section 4 ====
Round of 64
Yogeshwar Dutt (IND)	0	1
Mostafa Aghajani (IRI)	2	3
Abel Herrera (PER)	3	0
Dauren Zhumagaziyev (KAZ)	6	6
Abdulrahman Ibrahim (QAT)	6	3
Ghazwan Lazkani (SYR)	0	1
Fernando Iglesias (ARG)	0
Alejandro Valdés (CUB)	4^{F}
Judicael Mbaide (CHA)	0	0
Oleksandr Madyarchyk (GBR)	6	2
Rizvan Gadzhiev (BLR)	1	1
Vitaly Koryakin (TJK)	0	0
George Bucur (ROU)	2	2
Bazar Bazarguruev (KGZ)	0	0
Andrei Prepeliţă (MDA)	0	4	1
Sahit Prizreni (ALB)	1	3	0

Round of 32
Mostafa Aghajani (IRI)	0	0
Dauren Zhumagaziyev (KAZ)	1	3^{F}
Abdulrahman Ibrahim (QAT)	0
Alejandro Valdés (CUB)	4^{F}
Oleksandr Madyarchyk (GBR)	2	1
Rizvan Gadzhiev (BLR)	4	4
George Bucur (ROU)	2	1
Andrei Prepeliţă (MDA)	0	0

Round of 16
Dauren Zhumagaziyev (KAZ)	3	5
Alejandro Valdés (CUB)	0	3
Rizvan Gadzhiev (BLR)	3	0	1
George Bucur (ROU)	1	2	0

Quarterfinals
Dauren Zhumagaziyev (KAZ)	3	2
Rizvan Gadzhiev (BLR)	0	0

=== Repechage ===
Repechage round 1
Malkhaz Zarkua (GEO)	1	1
Ri Jong-myong (PRK)	0	0

Repechage round 2
Luis Portillo (ESA)	0	0
Wilfredo Henríquez (VEN)	1	1
Malkhaz Zarkua (GEO)	0	2	3
Lee Seung-chul (KOR)	2	0	1

Repechage round 3
Wilfredo Henríquez (VEN)	0	0
Kenichi Yumoto (JPN)	3	7
Malkhaz Zarkua (GEO)	1	3
Zelimkhan Huseynov (AZE)	1	0

Bronze medals
Kenichi Yumoto (JPN)	3	2
Didier Païs (FRA)	0	0
Malkhaz Zarkua (GEO)	2	0	0
Dauren Zhumagaziyev (KAZ)	0	2	6
