= 2010 World Wrestling Championships – Men's freestyle 60 kg =

Men's freestyle 60 kg at the 2010 World Championships
- Venue: Olympic Stadium
- Dates: 11 September 2010
- Competitors: 34 from 34 nations

Medalists
gold medal	Besik Kudukhov	Russia
silver medal	Vasyl Fedoryshyn	Ukraine
bronze medal	Morad Mohammadi	Iran
bronze medal	Zelimkhan Huseynov	Azerbaijan

The men's freestyle 60 kilograms is a competition featured at the 2010 World Wrestling Championships, and was held at the Olympic Stadium in Moscow, Russia on 11 September.

== Results ==
Legend

- F — Won by fall

=== Finals ===
Semifinals				Final
Besik Kudukhov (RUS)	1	4^{F}
Morad Mohammadi (IRI)	0	0		Besik Kudukhov (RUS)	1	1	3
Vasyl Fedoryshyn (UKR)	0	3	2	Vasyl Fedoryshyn (UKR)	0	1	0
Zelimkhan Huseynov (AZE)	2	0	0

=== Top half ===
==== Section 1 ====
Round of 64

Round of 32
Artur Arakelyan (ARM)	2	4
Agustín Sánchez (ESP)	0	0
Didier Païs (FRA)	0	0
Besik Kudukhov (RUS)	1	3
Hiroyuki Oda (JPN)	0	1	0
Enkhsaikhany Nyam-Ochir (MGL)	1	0	1
Ulan Nadyrbek Uulu (KGZ)	0	1	1
Marcel Ewald (GER)	1	0	0

Round of 16
Artur Arakelyan (ARM)	0	2
Besik Kudukhov (RUS)	1	5
Enkhsaikhany Nyam-Ochir (MGL)	3	1	0
Ulan Nadyrbek Uulu (KGZ)	3	0	1

Quarterfinals
Besik Kudukhov (RUS)	1	5
Ulan Nadyrbek Uulu (KGZ)	0	0

==== Section 2 ====
Round of 64

Round of 32
Morad Mohammadi (IRI)	4	1
Mahamedkamil Mahamedau (BLR)	1	1
Hassan Madani (EGY)	0	0
Andrei Prepeliţă (MDA)	3	6
Lee Seung-chul (KOR)	3	2
Mike Zadick (USA)	1	0
Zhang Xiaobin (CHN)	1	1
Silap Çariýew (TKM)	0	0

Round of 16
Morad Mohammadi (IRI)	3	3
Andrei Prepeliţă (MDA)	2	0
Lee Seung-chul (KOR)	0	1	4
Zhang Xiaobin (CHN)	1	0	0

Quarterfinals
Morad Mohammadi (IRI)	1	0	2
Lee Seung-chul (KOR)	1	1	2

=== Bottom half ===
==== Section 3 ====
Round of 64

Round of 32
Ersin Çetin (TUR)	4	2
Jukka Hyytiäinen (FIN)	0	1
Abylay Teltayev (KAZ)	1	2
Vitaly Koryakin (TJK)	0	0
Vasyl Fedoryshyn (UKR)	0	1	3
Dilshod Mansurov (UZB)	1	0	0
Malkhaz Kurdiani (GEO)	2	2
Franklin Gómez (PUR)	2	0

Round of 16
Ersin Çetin (TUR)	3	2
Abylay Teltayev (KAZ)	2	0
Vasyl Fedoryshyn (UKR)	3	0	2
Malkhaz Kurdiani (GEO)	0	1	1

Quarterfinals
Ersin Çetin (TUR)	0	0
Vasyl Fedoryshyn (UKR)	1	4^{F}

==== Section 4 ====
Round of 64
Sahit Prizreni (ALB)	2	5
Yogeshwar Dutt (IND)	0	2
Alejandro Valdés (CUB)	7	1
Gabriel García (DOM)	0	0

Round of 32
Amas Daniel (NGR)	6	4
Andrejs Vasiļjevs (LAT)	0	0
Zelimkhan Huseynov (AZE)	1	4
George Bucur (ROU)	0	1
Anatolie Guidea (BUL)	2	4
James Mancini (CAN)	0	0
Sahit Prizreni (ALB)	0	0
Alejandro Valdés (CUB)	1	3

Round of 16
Amas Daniel (NGR)	2	2
Zelimkhan Huseynov (AZE)	5	2
Anatolie Guidea (BUL)	0	0
Alejandro Valdés (CUB)	1	1

Quarterfinals
Zelimkhan Huseynov (AZE)	3	2	3
Alejandro Valdés (CUB)	2	2	0

=== Repechage ===
Repechage round 2
Didier Païs (FRA)	0	1	4
Artur Arakelyan (ARM)	1	0	1
Dilshod Mansurov (UZB)	0	1
Malkhaz Kurdiani (GEO)	1	2

Repechage round 3
Didier Païs (FRA)	3	0	1
Ulan Nadyrbek Uulu (KGZ)	1	1	2
Malkhaz Kurdiani (GEO)	0	0
Ersin Çetin (TUR)	1	7

Bronze medals
Ulan Nadyrbek Uulu (KGZ)	0	2	1
Morad Mohammadi (IRI)	3	1	4
Ersin Çetin (TUR)	2	0
Zelimkhan Huseynov (AZE)	5	4^{F}
