= 2006 World Wrestling Championships – Men's freestyle 60 kg =

Men's freestyle 60 kg at the 2006 World Championships
- Venue: Tianhe Gymnasium
- Dates: 27 September 2006
- Competitors: 30 from 30 nations

Medalists
gold medal	Morad Mohammadi	Iran
silver medal	Mike Zadick	United States
bronze medal	Noriyuki Takatsuka	Japan
bronze medal	Mavlet Batirov	Russia

The men's freestyle 60 kilograms is a competition featured at the 2006 World Wrestling Championships, and was held at the Tianhe Gymnasium in Guangzhou, China on 27 September 2006.

This freestyle wrestling competition consists of a single-elimination tournament, with a repechage used to determine the winner of two bronze medals.

== Results ==
Legend

- F — Won by fall

=== Final ===
Final
Morad Mohammadi (IRI)	1	1
Mike Zadick (USA)	0	1

=== Top half ===
Round of 32
Song Jae-myung (KOR)	0	0
Didier Païs (FRA)	4	6
Noriyuki Takatsuka (JPN)	3	3
Abil Ibragimov (AZE)	0	3
Łukasz Góral (POL)	0	0
David Pogosian (GEO)	1	6
Farzad Tarash (AUS)	7	6
Peter Peter (MHL)	0	0
Vasyl Fedoryshyn (UKR)	1	2	7
Sengedorjiin Sükhbaatar (MGL)	2	0	0
Murad Ramazanov (MKD)	0	0
Morad Mohammadi (IRI)	2	3

Round of 16
Gergõ Wöller (HUN)	3	6
Saeed Al-Qubaisi (UAE)	0	0
Didier Païs (FRA)	5	0	1
Noriyuki Takatsuka (JPN)	1	1	3
David Pogosian (GEO)	3	4
Farzad Tarash (AUS)	0	0
Vasyl Fedoryshyn (UKR)	1	1	0
Morad Mohammadi (IRI)	3	0	1

Quarterfinals
Gergõ Wöller (HUN)	2	0	1
Noriyuki Takatsuka (JPN)	0	1	2
David Pogosian (GEO)	0	0
Morad Mohammadi (IRI)	1	3

Semifinals
Noriyuki Takatsuka (JPN)	0	0
Morad Mohammadi (IRI)	4	1

=== Bottom half ===
Round of 32
Anatolie Guidea (BUL)	0	0
Yogeshwar Dutt (IND)	1	1
Hassan Madani (EGY)	0	0
Ko Jong-chol (PRK)	8	4
Mike Zadick (USA)	3	1
Saeed Azarbayjani (CAN)	1	0
Farkhod Urazimbetov (UZB)	0	1	1
Aliaksandr Karnitski (BLR)	6	0	2
Armen Karapetyan (ARM)	0	0
Tevfik Odabaşı (TUR)	2	7
Mavlet Batirov (RUS)	2	3
Yerbol Issayev (KAZ)	0	1
Qin He (CHN)	0	1
Yandro Quintana (CUB)	2	1
Petru Toarcă (ROM)	7	5
Nelson García (COL)	0	4

Round of 16
Yogeshwar Dutt (IND)	5	0	8
Ko Jong-chol (PRK)	0	6	1
Mike Zadick (USA)	1	1
Aliaksandr Karnitski (BLR)	0	0
Tevfik Odabaşı (TUR)	1	0
Mavlet Batirov (RUS)	2	3^{F}
Yandro Quintana (CUB)	1	1
Petru Toarcă (ROM)	0	0

Quarterfinals
Yogeshwar Dutt (IND)	0	0
Mike Zadick (USA)	2	1
Mavlet Batirov (RUS)	1	2
Yandro Quintana (CUB)	0	0

Semifinals
Mike Zadick (USA)	1	1
Mavlet Batirov (RUS)	0	0

=== Repechage ===
Repechage round 1
Murad Ramazanov (MKD)	0	0
Vasyl Fedoryshyn (UKR)	3	3
Saeed Azarbayjani (CAN)	0	0
Aliaksandr Karnitski (BLR)	1	1

Repechage round 2
Vasyl Fedoryshyn (UKR)	0	1	1
David Pogosian (GEO)	1	0	0
Aliaksandr Karnitski (BLR)	0	0
Yogeshwar Dutt (IND)	1	3

Bronze medals
Vasyl Fedoryshyn (UKR)	0	0
Noriyuki Takatsuka (JPN)	1	1
Yogeshwar Dutt (IND)	1	0
Mavlet Batirov (RUS)	3	2
