= Macedonia at the 2008 Summer Olympics =

- Flag of the Republic of Macedonia
- IOC code: MKD
- NOC: Olympic Committee of the Former Yugoslav Republic of Macedonia
- Website: www.mok.org.mk (in Macedonian)

in Beijing
- Competitors: 7 in 5 sports
- Flag bearer: Atanas Nikolovski
- Medals: Gold 0 Silver 0 Bronze 0 Total 0

Summer Olympics appearances (overview)
- 1996; 2000; 2004; 2008; 2012; 2016; 2020; 2024

Other related appearances
- Yugoslavia (1920–1988); Independent Olympic Participants (1992)

The Former Yugoslav Republic of Macedonia was represented at the 2008 Summer Olympics in Beijing, China by the Olympic Committee of the Former Yugoslav Republic of Macedonia.

In total, seven athletes including five men and two women represented the Former Yugoslav Republic of Macedonia in five different sports including athletics, canoeing, shooting, swimming and wrestling.

== Competitors ==
In total, seven athletes represented the Former Yugoslav Republic of Macedonia at the 2008 Summer Olympics in Beijing, China across five different sports.

Sport	Men	Women	Total
Athletics	1	1	2
Canoeing	1	0	1
Shooting	1	0	1
Swimming	1	1	2
Wrestling	1	0	1
Total	5	2	7

== Athletics ==
In total, two Macedonian athletes participated in the athletics events – Ivana Rožman in the women's 100 m and Redžep Selman in the men's triple jump.

The qualifying round for the men's triple jump took place on 18 August 2008. Selman contested qualifying group A. His best jump of 15.29 m came on his second attempt. However, it was not enough to advance to the final and he finished 37th overall.

Athlete	Event	Qualification		Final	
Athlete	Event	Distance	Position	Distance	Position
Redžep Selman	Triple jump	15.29	37	Did not advance	

The heats for the women's 100 m took place on 16 August 2008. Rožman finished seventh in her heat in a time of 12.92 seconds and she did not advance to the quarter-finals.

Athlete	Event	Heat		Quarterfinal		Semifinal		Final	
Athlete	Event	Result	Rank	Result	Rank	Result	Rank	Result	Rank
Ivana Rožman	100 m	12.92	7	Did not advance					

== Canoeing ==
In total, one Macedonian athlete participated in the canoeing events – Atanas Nikolovski in the men's slalom K-1.

The qualifying round for the men's slalom K-1 took place on 11 August 2008. Nikolovski completed his two runs in a combined time of three minutes 1.19 seconds and he did not advance to the semi-final.

Athlete	Event	Preliminary						Semifinal		Final			
Athlete	Event	Run 1	Rank	Run 2	Rank	Total	Rank	Time	Rank	Time	Rank	Total	Rank
Atanas Nikolovski	Men's K-1	92.63	21	88.56	15	181.19	19	Did not advance					

== Shooting ==
In total, one Macedonian athlete participated in the shooting events – Sašo Nestorov in the men's 10 m air rifle.

The men's 10 m air rifle took place on 11 August 2008. In the preliminary round, Nestorov scored a total of 558 points across the six rounds. He did nt advance to the final and was ranked 51st overall.

Athlete	Event	Qualification		Final	
Athlete	Event	Points	Rank	Points	Rank
Sašo Nestorov	10 m air rifle	558	51	Did not advance	

== Swimming ==
In total, two Macedonian athletes participated in the swimming events – Elena Popovska in the women's 100 m freestyle and Mihajlo Ristovski in the men's 200 m freestyle.

The heats for the men's 200 m freestyle took place on 10 August 2008. Ristovski finished first in his heat in a time of one minute 57.45 seconds which was ultimately not fast enough to advance to the semi-finals.

Athlete	Event	Heat		Semifinal		Final	
Athlete	Event	Time	Rank	Time	Rank	Time	Rank
Mihajlo Ristovski	200 m freestyle	1:57.45	55	Did not advance			

The heats for the women's 100 m freestyle took place on 13 August 2008. Popovska finished second in her heat in a time of 59.93 seconds which was ultimately not fast enough to advance to the semi-finals.

Athlete	Event	Heat		Semifinal		Final	
Athlete	Event	Time	Rank	Time	Rank	Time	Rank
Elena Popovska	100 m freestyle	59.93	47	Did not advance			

== Wrestling ==
In total, one Macedonian athlete participated in the wrestling events – Murad Ramazanov in the men's freestyle −60 kg category.

The men's freestyle −60 kg category took place on 19 August 2008. Ramazanov defeated Tevfik Odabaşı of Turkey in the first round. In the second round, he defeated to Kim Jong-Dae of South Korea. In the quarter-finals, he lost to Mavlet Batirov of Russia, In the repechage, he lost to Zelimkhan Huseynov of Azerbaijan.

Athlete	Event	Qualification	Round of 16	Quarterfinal	Semifinal	Repechage 1	Repechage 2	Final / BM	
Athlete	Event	Opposition Result	Opposition Result	Opposition Result	Opposition Result	Opposition Result	Opposition Result	Opposition Result	Rank
Murad Ramazanov	−60 kg	Odabaşı (TUR); W 3–1 ^{PP}	Kim J-D (KOR); W 3–1 ^{PP}	Batirov (RUS); L 0–3 ^{PO}	Did not advance	Bye	Huseynov (AZE); L 1–3 ^{PP}	Did not advance	7

== See also ==
- Macedonia at the 2008 Summer Paralympics
