= Wrestling at the 2010 Asian Games – Men's freestyle 60 kg =

Men's freestyle 60 kg at the 2010 Asian Games
- Venue: Huagong Gymnasium
- Date: 23 November 2010
- Competitors: 17 from 17 nations

Medalists
gold medal	Ganzorigiin Mandakhnaran	Mongolia
silver medal	Hiroyuki Oda	Japan
bronze medal	Gao Feng	China
bronze medal	Dauren Zhumagaziyev	Kazakhstan

The men's freestyle 60 kilograms wrestling competition at the 2010 Asian Games in Guangzhou was held on 23 November 2010 at the Huagong Gymnasium.

This freestyle wrestling competition consisted of a single-elimination tournament, with a repechage used to determine the winner of two bronze medals. The two finalists faced off for gold and silver medals. Each wrestler who lost to one of the two finalists moved into the repechage, culminating in a pair of bronze medal matches featuring the semifinal losers each facing the remaining repechage opponent from their half of the bracket.

Each bout consisted of up to three rounds, lasting two minutes apiece. The wrestler who scored more points in each round was the winner of that rounds; the bout finished when one wrestler had won two rounds (and thus the match).

== Schedule ==
All times are China Standard Time (UTC+08:00)

Date	Time	Event
Tuesday, 23 November 2010	09:30	1/16 finals
Tuesday, 23 November 2010	09:30	1/8 finals
Tuesday, 23 November 2010	09:30	Quarterfinals
Tuesday, 23 November 2010	09:30	Semifinals
Tuesday, 23 November 2010	16:00	Repechages
Tuesday, 23 November 2010	17:00	Finals

== Results ==
Legend

- F — Won by fall

=== Main bracket ===
==== Final ====
Final
Ganzorigiin Mandakhnaran (MGL)	0	4	7^{F}
Hiroyuki Oda (JPN)	3	2	1

==== Top half ====
1/16 finals

1/8 finals
Abdulrahman Farhan (YEM)	4	3
Kang Den Piseth (CAM)	0	0
Ganzorigiin Mandakhnaran (MGL)	3	1	2
Saeid Ahmadi (IRI)	1	4	0
Gao Feng (CHN)	7	1
Ramazan Kambarow (TKM)	0	0
Abdul Karim Wahedi (AFG)	5	1
Ghazwan Lazkani (SYR)	3	0

Quarterfinals
Abdulrahman Farhan (YEM)	0	0
Ganzorigiin Mandakhnaran (MGL)	2	7
Gao Feng (CHN)	1	4
Abdul Karim Wahedi (AFG)	0	0

Semifinals
Ganzorigiin Mandakhnaran (MGL)	0	2	3
Gao Feng (CHN)	1	0	1

==== Bottom half ====
1/16 finals
Ricky Fajar (INA)	0	0
Oybek Kamolov (UZB)	1	4

1/8 finals
Ali Riyadh (IRQ)	0	0
Dauren Zhumagaziyev (KAZ)	4	7
Lee Seung-chul (KOR)	3	7
Vitaly Koryakin (TJK)	1	0
Hiroyuki Oda (JPN)	1	3
Bazar Bazarguruev (KGZ)	0	0
Ri Jong-myong (PRK)	1	6
Oybek Kamolov (UZB)	0	0

Quarterfinals
Dauren Zhumagaziyev (KAZ)	1	5
Lee Seung-chul (KOR)	0	3
Hiroyuki Oda (JPN)	5	1	2
Ri Jong-myong (PRK)	0	2	1

Semifinals
Dauren Zhumagaziyev (KAZ)	2	0	0
Hiroyuki Oda (JPN)	0	1	8

=== Repechage ===
Repechage round 2
Saeid Ahmadi (IRI)	7	7
Abdulrahman Farhan (YEM)	0	0
Bazar Bazarguruev (KGZ)	0	2	0
Ri Jong-myong (PRK)	2	0	1

Bronze medals
Saeid Ahmadi (IRI)	1	1	0
Gao Feng (CHN)	0	4	2
Ri Jong-myong (PRK)	1	1
Dauren Zhumagaziyev (KAZ)	2	1

== Final standing ==
Rank	Athlete
1st place, gold medalist(s)	Ganzorigiin Mandakhnaran (MGL)
2nd place, silver medalist(s)	Hiroyuki Oda (JPN)
3rd place, bronze medalist(s)	Gao Feng (CHN)
3rd place, bronze medalist(s)	Dauren Zhumagaziyev (KAZ)
5	Saeid Ahmadi (IRI)
5	Ri Jong-myong (PRK)
7	Lee Seung-chul (KOR)
8	Abdulrahman Farhan (YEM)
9	Abdul Karim Wahedi (AFG)
10	Oybek Kamolov (UZB)
11	Ghazwan Lazkani (SYR)
12	Bazar Bazarguruev (KGZ)
13	Vitaly Koryakin (TJK)
14	Ricky Fajar (INA)
15	Kang Den Piseth (CAM)
16	Ramazan Kambarow (TKM)
17	Ali Riyadh (IRQ)
