= Wrestling at the 2004 Summer Olympics – Men's freestyle 55 kg =

Men's freestyle 55 kg at the Games of the XXVIII Olympiad
- Venue: Ano Liosia Olympic Hall
- Date: 27–28 August 2004
- Competitors: 22 from 22 nations

Medalists
1st place, gold medalist(s)		Mavlet Batirov	Russia
2nd place, silver medalist(s)		Stephen Abas	United States
3rd place, bronze medalist(s)		Chikara Tanabe	Japan

The men's freestyle 55 kilograms at the 2004 Summer Olympics as part of the wrestling program were held at the Ano Liosia Olympic Hall, August 27 to August 28.

The competition held with an elimination system of three or four wrestlers in each pool, with the winners qualify for the quarterfinals, semifinals and final by way of direct elimination.

== Schedule ==
All times are Eastern European Summer Time (UTC+03:00)

Date	Time	Event
27 August 2004	09:30	Round 1
27 August 2004	09:30	Round 2
27 August 2004	17:30	Round 3
27 August 2004	17:30	Qualification
28 August 2004	09:30	Semifinals
28 August 2004	17:30	Finals

== Results ==
Legend

- WO — Won by walkover

=== Elimination pools ===
==== Pool 1 ====
Pos	Athlete	Pld	W	L	CP	TP	Qualification
1	Stephen Abas (USA)	2	2	0	6	10	Knockout round
2	René Montero (CUB)	2	1	1	4	8	
3	Ghenadie Tulbea (MDA)	2	0	2	1	1	

Source: Official website

	Score		CP
Ghenadie Tulbea (MDA)	0–5	René Montero (CUB)	0–3 PO
Stephen Abas (USA)	6–1	Ghenadie Tulbea (MDA)	3–1 PP
René Montero (CUB)	3–4	Stephen Abas (USA)	1–3 PP

==== Pool 2 ====
Pos	Athlete	Pld	W	L	CP	TP	Qualification
1	Li Zhengyu (CHN)	2	2	0	6	13	Knockout round
2	Radoslav Velikov (BUL)	2	1	1	5	19	
3	Shaun Williams (RSA)	2	0	2	2	6	

Source: Official website

	Score		CP
Radoslav Velikov (BUL)	13–2	Shaun Williams (RSA)	4–1 SP
Li Zhengyu (CHN)	8–6	Radoslav Velikov (BUL)	3–1 PP
Shaun Williams (RSA)	4–5	Li Zhengyu (CHN)	1–3 PP

==== Pool 3 ====
Pos	Athlete	Pld	W	L	CP	TP	Qualification
1	Kim Hyo-sub (KOR)	2	1	1	4 (Note: Head-to-head result: KOR 3–1 MGL.)	8	Knockout round
2	Bayaraagiin Naranbaatar (MGL)	2	1	1	4	9	
3	Babak Nourzad (IRI)	2	1	1	3	6	

Source: Official website
Notes:

	Score		CP
Babak Nourzad (IRI)	0–6	Bayaraagiin Naranbaatar (MGL)	0–3 PO
Kim Hyo-sub (KOR)	4–6	Babak Nourzad (IRI)	1–3 PP
Bayaraagiin Naranbaatar (MGL)	3–4	Kim Hyo-sub (KOR)	1–3 PP

==== Pool 4 ====
Pos	Athlete	Pld	W	L	CP	TP	Qualification
1	Chikara Tanabe (JPN)	2	2	0	6	9	Knockout round
2	Namig Abdullayev (AZE)	2	1	1	4	8	
3	Yogeshwar Dutt (IND)	2	0	2	2	5	

Source: Official website

	Score		CP
Chikara Tanabe (JPN)	5–2	Namig Abdullayev (AZE)	3–1 PP
Yogeshwar Dutt (IND)	3–4	Chikara Tanabe (JPN)	1–3 PP
Namig Abdullayev (AZE)	6–2	Yogeshwar Dutt (IND)	3–1 PP

==== Pool 5 ====
Pos	Athlete	Pld	W	L	CP	TP	Qualification
1	Oleksandr Zakharuk (UKR)	2	2	0	6	7	Knockout round
2	Herman Kantoyeu (BLR)	2	1	1	4	7	
3	Bauyrzhan Orazgaliyev (KAZ)	2	0	2	2	2	

Source: Official website

	Score		CP
Oleksandr Zakharuk (UKR)	3–1	Bauyrzhan Orazgaliyev (KAZ)	3–1 PP
Herman Kantoyeu (BLR)	3–4	Oleksandr Zakharuk (UKR)	1–3 PP
Bauyrzhan Orazgaliyev (KAZ)	1–4	Herman Kantoyeu (BLR)	1–3 PP

==== Pool 6 ====
Pos	Athlete	Pld	W	L	CP	TP	Qualification
1	Mavlet Batirov (RUS)	2	2	0	7	23	Knockout round
2	Dilshod Mansurov (UZB)	2	1	1	5	12	
3	Bashir Ahmad Rahmati (AFG)	2	0	2	0	0	

Source: Official website

	Score		CP
Bashir Ahmad Rahmati (AFG)	0–11	Dilshod Mansurov (UZB)	0–4 ST
Mavlet Batirov (RUS)	20–0	Bashir Ahmad Rahmati (AFG)	4–0 ST
Dilshod Mansurov (UZB)	1–3	Mavlet Batirov (RUS)	1–3 PP

==== Pool 7 ====
Pos	Athlete	Pld	W	L	CP	TP	Qualification
1	Amiran Kardanov (GRE)	3	3	0	10	17	Knockout round
2	O Song-nam (PRK)	3	2	1	8	8	
3	Martin Berberyan (ARM)	3	1	2	5	9	
4	Harun Doğan (TUR)	3	0	3	1	3	

Source: Official website

	Score		CP
O Song-nam (PRK)	3–4	Amiran Kardanov (GRE)	1–3 PP
Martin Berberyan (ARM)	5–3	Harun Doğan (TUR)	3–1 PP
O Song-nam (PRK)	5–2	Martin Berberyan (ARM)	3–1 PP
Amiran Kardanov (GRE)	10–0	Harun Doğan (TUR)	4–0 ST
O Song-nam (PRK)	WO	Harun Doğan (TUR)	4–0 PA
Amiran Kardanov (GRE)	3–2	Martin Berberyan (ARM)	3–1 PP

=== Knockout round ===
Qualification
Stephen Abas (USA)	6
Li Zhengyu (CHN)	1
Kim Hyo-sub (KOR)	0
Chikara Tanabe (JPN)	10
Oleksandr Zakharuk (UKR)	0
Mavlet Batirov (RUS)	4

Semifinals
Stephen Abas (USA)	3
Chikara Tanabe (JPN)	0
Mavlet Batirov (RUS)	7
Amiran Kardanov (GRE)	1

Gold medal match
Stephen Abas (USA)	1
Mavlet Batirov (RUS)	9
Bronze medal match
Chikara Tanabe (JPN)	7
Amiran Kardanov (GRE)	0

Classification 5–6
Li Zhengyu (CHN)	6
Kim Hyo-sub (KOR)	4

== Final standing ==
Rank	Athlete
1st place, gold medalist(s)	Mavlet Batirov (RUS)
2nd place, silver medalist(s)	Stephen Abas (USA)
3rd place, bronze medalist(s)	Chikara Tanabe (JPN)
4	Amiran Kardanov (GRE)
5	Li Zhengyu (CHN)
6	Kim Hyo-sub (KOR)
7	Oleksandr Zakharuk (UKR)
8	O Song-nam (PRK)
9	Radoslav Velikov (BUL)
10	Dilshod Mansurov (UZB)
11	Martin Berberyan (ARM)
12	Bayaraagiin Naranbaatar (MGL)
13	René Montero (CUB)
14	Namig Abdullayev (AZE)
15	Herman Kantoyeu (BLR)
16	Babak Nourzad (IRI)
17	Shaun Williams (RSA)
18	Yogeshwar Dutt (IND)
19	Bauyrzhan Orazgaliyev (KAZ)
20	Harun Doğan (TUR)
21	Ghenadie Tulbea (MDA)
22	Bashir Ahmad Rahmati (AFG)
