= Wrestling at the 2002 Asian Games =

- Venue: Yangsan Gymnasium
- Dates: 2–8 October 2002
- Competitors: 196 from 24 nations

Wrestling was one of the many sports which was held at the 2002 Asian Games in Busan, South Korea between 2 and 8 October 2002. The competition took place at Yangsan Gymnasium.

== Schedule ==
●	Round	●	Last round	P	Preliminary rounds	F	Semifinals & Finals

Event↓/Date →	2nd Wed	3rd Thu		4th Fri		5th Sat	6th Sun	7th Mon		8th Tue	
Men's freestyle 55 kg							P	F			
Men's freestyle 60 kg								P		P	F
Men's freestyle 66 kg							P	F			
Men's freestyle 74 kg								P		P	F
Men's freestyle 84 kg							P	F			
Men's freestyle 96 kg								P		P	F
Men's freestyle 120 kg							P	P	F		
Men's Greco-Roman 55 kg	P	P	F								
Men's Greco-Roman 60 kg		P		P	F						
Men's Greco-Roman 66 kg	P	F									
Men's Greco-Roman 74 kg		P		P	F						
Men's Greco-Roman 84 kg	P	P	F								
Men's Greco-Roman 96 kg		P		P	F						
Men's Greco-Roman 120 kg	P	P	F								
Women's freestyle 48 kg	P	F									
Women's freestyle 55 kg							●	●			
Women's freestyle 63 kg		P		P	F						
Women's freestyle 72 kg								●		●	

== Medalists ==
=== Men's freestyle ===
Event	Gold	Silver	Bronze
55 kg	Dilshod Mansurov; Uzbekistan	Chikara Tanabe; Japan	Mohammad Rezaei; Iran
60 kg	Oyuunbilegiin Pürevbaatar; Mongolia	Song Jae-myung; South Korea	Ulan Nadyrbek Uulu; Kyrgyzstan
66 kg	Baek Jin-kuk; South Korea	Alireza Dabir; Iran	Norjingiin Bayarmagnai; Mongolia
74 kg	Cho Byung-kwan; South Korea	Yusup Abdusalomov; Tajikistan	Mehdi Hajizadeh; Iran
84 kg	Moon Eui-jae; South Korea	Magomed Kurugliyev; Kazakhstan	Shamil Aliev; Tajikistan
96 kg	Alireza Heidari; Iran	Aleksey Krupnyakov; Kyrgyzstan	Magomed Ibragimov; Uzbekistan
120 kg	Artur Taymazov; Uzbekistan	Abbas Jadidi; Iran	Palwinder Singh Cheema; India

=== Men's Greco-Roman ===
Event	Gold	Silver	Bronze
55 kg	Asset Imanbayev; Kazakhstan	Kang Yong-gyun; North Korea	Uran Kalilov; Kyrgyzstan
60 kg	Kang Kyung-il; South Korea	Dilshod Aripov; Uzbekistan	Makoto Sasamoto; Japan
66 kg	Kim In-sub; South Korea	Daniar Kobonov; Kyrgyzstan	Kim Yun-mo; North Korea
74 kg	Kim Jin-soo; South Korea	Danil Khalimov; Kazakhstan	Parviz Zeidvand; Iran
84 kg	Shingo Matsumoto; Japan	Kim Jung-sub; South Korea	Mohammad Al-Ken; Syria
96 kg	Aleksey Cheglakov; Uzbekistan	Park Myung-suk; South Korea	Masoud Hashemzadeh; Iran
120 kg	Georgiy Tsurtsumia; Kazakhstan	Yang Young-jin; South Korea	Alireza Gharibi; Iran

=== Women's freestyle ===
Event	Gold	Silver	Bronze
48 kg	Zhong Xiue; China	Lidiya Karamchakova; Tajikistan	Tsogtbazaryn Enkhjargal; Mongolia
55 kg	Saori Yoshida; Japan	Lee Na-lae; South Korea	Naidangiin Otgonjargal; Mongolia
63 kg	Xu Haiyan; China	Kaori Icho; Japan	Ochirbatyn Myagmarsüren; Mongolia
72 kg	Kyoko Hamaguchi; Japan	Kang Min-jeong; South Korea	Yana Panova; Kyrgyzstan

== Medal table ==
Rank	Nation	Gold	Silver	Bronze	Total
1	South Korea (KOR)	6	6	0	12
2	Japan (JPN)	3	2	1	6
3	Uzbekistan (UZB)	3	1	1	5
4	Kazakhstan (KAZ)	2	2	0	4
5	China (CHN)	2	0	0	2
6	Iran (IRI)	1	2	5	8
7	Mongolia (MGL)	1	0	4	5
8	Kyrgyzstan (KGZ)	0	2	3	5
9	Tajikistan (TJK)	0	2	1	3
10	North Korea (PRK)	0	1	1	2
11	India (IND)	0	0	1	1
11	Syria (SYR)	0	0	1	1
Totals (12 entries)		18	18	18	54

== Participating nations ==
A total of 196 athletes from 24 nations competed in wrestling at the 2002 Asian Games:

- Afghanistan (8)
- Bangladesh (2)
- China (14)
- Chinese Taipei (2)
- India (16)
- Iran (14)
- Japan (17)
- Jordan (2)
- Kazakhstan (13)
- Kyrgyzstan (13)
- Lebanon (1)
- Mongolia (11)
- North Korea (6)
- Pakistan (2)
- Palestine (2)
- Philippines (8)
- Qatar (11)
- South Korea (17)
- Syria (7)
- Tajikistan (6)
- Turkmenistan (7)
- Uzbekistan (12)
- Vietnam (3)
- Yemen (2)
