= Bashir Ahmad Rahmati =

Afghan freestyle wrestler (born 1985)

Personal information
- Full name: Bashir Ahmad Rahmati
- Born: 5 June 1985 (age 41) Parwan Province, Afghanistan
- Height: 1.60 m (5 ft 3 in)
- Weight: 55 kg (121 lb)

Sport
- Style: Freestyle

Bashir Ahmad Rahmati (born June 5, 1985, in Afghanistan) is a retired amateur Afghan freestyle wrestler, who competed in the men's featherweight category. Under an Olympic Solidarity program, Rahmati qualified for the Afghan squad in the men's featherweight class (55 kg) at the 2004 Summer Olympics in Athens through a tripartite invitation from the International Federation of Associated Wrestling (FILA). He lost two straight matches to Uzbekistan's Dilshod Mansurov and Russia's Mavlet Batirov, who eventually took home the Olympic gold medal at the end of the tournament, with a greater superiority effort, finishing last in the prelim pool and twenty-second overall in the final standings.
