= Nestorov =

Nestorov is a surname. Notable people with the surname include:

- Ivan Nestorov (1933–2026), Bulgarian actor
- Metodi Nestorov (fl. 1957–1958), Bulgarian footballer
- Sašo Nestorov (born 1987), Macedonian rifle shooter
