= Wrestling at the 2008 Summer Olympics – Men's freestyle 60 kg =

Men's freestyle 60 kg at the Games of the XXIX Olympiad
- Venue: China Agricultural University Gymnasium
- Date: 19 August 2008
- Competitors: 19 from 19 nations

Medalists
1st place, gold medalist(s)		Mavlet Batirov	Russia
2nd place, silver medalist(s)		Kenichi Yumoto	Japan
3rd place, bronze medalist(s)		Bazar Bazarguruev	Kyrgyzstan
3rd place, bronze medalist(s)		Morad Mohammadi	Iran

Men's Freestyle 60 kilograms competition at the 2008 Summer Olympics in Beijing, China, was held on 19 August 2008 at the China Agricultural University Gymnasium.

This freestyle wrestling competition consisted of a single-elimination tournament, with a repechage used to determine the winner of two bronze medals. The two finalists faced off for gold and silver medals. Each wrestler who lost to one of the two finalists moved into the repechage, culminating in a pair of bronze medal matches featuring the semifinal losers each facing the remaining repechage opponent from their half of the bracket.

Each bout consisted of up to three rounds, lasting two minutes apiece. The wrestler who scored more points in each round was the winner of that round; the bout finished when one wrestler had won two rounds (and thus the match).

On 23 September 2016, reports indicate wrestler Vasyl Fedoryshyn of Ukraine has been stripped of the 2008 Olympic silver medal due to a positive test for doping.

== Schedule ==
All times are China Standard Time (UTC+08:00)

Date	Time	Event
19 August 2008	09:30	Qualification rounds
19 August 2008	16:00	Repechage
19 August 2008	17:00	Finals

== Results ==
Legend

- F — Won by fall

=== Final ===
Final
Vasyl Fedoryshyn (UKR)	0	1
Mavlet Batirov (RUS)	1	2

=== Top half ===
Qualifications

1/8 finals
Bazar Bazarguruev (KGZ)	1	2
Sahit Prizreni (ALB)	0	0
Mike Zadick (USA)	0	0
Vasyl Fedoryshyn (UKR)	5	6
Vitaly Koryakin (TJK)	2	1
Kenichi Yumoto (JPN)	2	4^{F}
Bauyrzhan Orazgaliyev (KAZ)	2	0	0
Yogeshwar Dutt (IND)	0	3	5

Quarterfinals
Bazar Bazarguruev (KGZ)	1	0
Vasyl Fedoryshyn (UKR)	2	1
Kenichi Yumoto (JPN)	0	4	2
Yogeshwar Dutt (IND)	1	1	1

Semifinals
Vasyl Fedoryshyn (UKR)	3	1
Kenichi Yumoto (JPN)	2	0

=== Bottom half ===
Qualifications
Murad Ramazanov (MKD)	0	2	2
Tevfik Odabaşı (TUR)	7	0	0
Qin He (CHN)	1	0
Yandro Quintana (CUB)	4	1
Zelimkhan Huseynov (AZE)	0	0
Mavlet Batirov (RUS)	1	1

1/8 finals
Martin Berberyan (ARM)	0	0
Saeed Azarbayjani (CAN)	1	3
Hassan Madani (EGY)	0	0
Morad Mohammadi (IRI)	7	2
Kim Jong-dae (KOR)	0	1
Murad Ramazanov (MKD)	4	3
Yandro Quintana (CUB)	0	1	0
Mavlet Batirov (RUS)	1	1	4

Quarterfinals
Saeed Azarbayjani (CAN)	0	0
Morad Mohammadi (IRI)	1	1
Murad Ramazanov (MKD)	0	0
Mavlet Batirov (RUS)	1	2

Semifinals
Morad Mohammadi (IRI)	0	0
Mavlet Batirov (RUS)	1	1

=== Repechage ===
Repechage round 1
Zelimkhan Huseynov (AZE)	0	1	4
Yandro Quintana (CUB)	1	1	3

Repechage round 2
Mike Zadick (USA)	0	0
Bazar Bazarguruev (KGZ)	1	3
Zelimkhan Huseynov (AZE)	1	3
Murad Ramazanov (MKD)	0	1

Bronze medals
Bazar Bazarguruev (KGZ)	0	0
Kenichi Yumoto (JPN)	1	2
Zelimkhan Huseynov (AZE)	0	1
Morad Mohammadi (IRI)	2	3

== Final standing ==
Rank	Athlete
1st place, gold medalist(s)	Mavlet Batirov (RUS)
2nd place, silver medalist(s)	Kenichi Yumoto (JPN)
3rd place, bronze medalist(s)	Bazar Bazarguruev (KGZ)
3rd place, bronze medalist(s)	Morad Mohammadi (IRI)
5	Zelimkhan Huseynov (AZE)
6	Murad Ramazanov (MKD)
7	Yandro Quintana (CUB)
8	Yogeshwar Dutt (IND)
9	Saeed Azarbayjani (CAN)
10	Tevfik Odabaşı (TUR)
11	Bauyrzhan Orazgaliyev (KAZ)
12	Qin He (CHN)
13	Kim Jong-dae (KOR)
14	Vitaly Koryakin (TJK)
15	Sahit Prizreni (ALB)
16	Martin Berberyan (ARM)
17	Hassan Madani (EGY)
18	Mike Zadick (USA)
DQ	Vasyl Fedoryshyn (UKR)

- Vasyl Fedoryshyn of Ukraine originally won the silver medal, but was disqualified after he tested positive for Chlorodehydromethyltestosterone.
