= Shaun Williams (wrestler) =

South African Olympic wrestler

Personal information
- Full name: Shaun Phillip Williams
- Nationality: South Africa
- Born: 5 December 1976 (age 49) Pretoria, South Africa
- Height: 1.68 m (5 ft 6 in)
- Weight: 60 kg (132 lb)

Sport
- Style: Freestyle
- Club: University of Oregon (USA)
- Coach: Pat Whidcomb (USA)
Medal record
Men's freestyle wrestling
Representing South Africa
Commonwealth Games
Bronze medal – third place	2002 Manchester	55 kg
All-Africa Games
Silver medal – second place	1999 Johannesburg	54 kg
Silver medal – second place	2003 Abuja	55 kg
Bronze medal – third place	1995 Harare	48 kg

Shaun Phillip Williams (born December 5, 1976, in Pretoria) is a retired amateur South African freestyle wrestler, who competed in the men's featherweight category. Williams has claimed three medals (two silver and one bronze) at the All-Africa Games, picked up a bronze in the 55-kg division at the 2002 Commonwealth Games in Manchester, and later represented his nation South Africa, as a lone wrestler, at the 2004 Summer Olympics. Williams also trained for the University of Oregon's freestyle wrestling team, under his coach Pat Whidcomb, while studying and attending college in the United States.

Williams emerged himself into the international spotlight at the 2002 Commonwealth Games in Manchester, United Kingdom, where he took home the bronze medal in the men's featherweight division (55 kg). The following year, Williams continued to produce another sporting success by bringing home the African championship title in freestyle wrestling, and by ending up eleventh in the same class at the 2003 World Wrestling Championships in New York City, New York, United States, which earned him a ticket to compete for the South African Olympic team.

At the 2004 Summer Olympics in Athens, Williams qualified as a lone wrestler for the South African squad in the men's featherweight class (55 kg), by receiving a berth and rounding out the top eleven spot from the World Championships. He lost his opening bout against Bulgaria's Radoslav Velikov because of the ten-point superiority limit, and could not gain enough points to outclass China's Li Zhengyu in a sudden-death match 4–5, leaving Williams on the bottom of the prelim pool and finishing seventeenth overall in the final standings.

After his retirement from the sport in late 2007, Williams worked as the wrestling head coach for Hermiston High School in Hermiston, Oregon. In late 2015, Williams moved to Spokane, Washington, and began work for Central Valley High School in Spokane Valley, Washington, where he started a new role as a resource education teacher, in addition to his role serving as the school's current wrestling head coach.

== See also ==
- List of University of Oregon alumni
