= Bauyrzhan =

- Gender: Male

Origin
- Origin: Kazakh

Bauyrzhan (Kazakh: Бауыржан) is a Kazakh given name. The name has two parts: the first, Bauyr, a traditional Kazakh word meaning brother or relative; the second, jan/jaan, a Persian and Urdu word meaning soul or dear.

The name Bauyrjan is sometimes spelled by Russian-speaking peoples in Central Asia as Bauyrzhan, since the closest equivalent of the j sound in Russian is spelled as zh.

== Notable people with the given name ==
- Bauyrzhan Momyshuly, Kazakh military officer and author
- Bauyrzhan Mukhamedzhanov, Kazakh politician
- Bauyrzhan Islamkhan, Kazakh football player
- Bauyrzhan Turysbek, Kazakh football player
- Bauyrjan Baibek, Kazakh politician
- Bauyrzhan Orazgaliyev, Kazakh wrestler
- Bauyrzhan Murzabayev, Kazakh jockey
