= Seong-nam (name) =

- Hangul: 성남
- RR: Seongnam
- MR: Sŏngnam

Seong-nam, also spelled Sung-nam or Song-nam, is a Korean given name.

People with this name include:

- Hong Song-nam (1929–2009), North Korean politician
- Kim Sung-nam (born 1954), South Korean footballer
- Lee Seong-nam (born 1977 as Denis Laktionov), naturalised South Korean footballer originally from Russia
- O Song-nam (born 1982), North Korean freestyle wrestler
- Ahn Sung-nam (born 1984), South Korean footballer
- Kim Song-nam (table tennis), North Korean table tennis player

== See also ==
- List of Korean given names
