= Coleman Scott =

American wrestler and coach (born 1986)

Personal information
- Born: April 19, 1986 (age 40) Waynesburg, Pennsylvania, U.S.
- Height: 5 ft 6 in (168 cm)
- Weight: 60 kg (132 lb)

Sport
- Country: United States
- Sport: Wrestling
- Events: Freestyle and Folkstyle
- College team: Oklahoma State
- Club: Gator Wrestling Club
- Team: USA
- Coached by: John Smith
Medal record
Men's freestyle wrestling
Representing the United States
Olympic Games
Bronze medal – third place	2012 London	60 kg
World Cup
Silver medal – second place	2015 Los Angeles	Team
Pan American Championships
Gold medal – first place	2016 Frisco	61 kg
Bronze medal – third place	2010 Monterrey	60 kg
Men's collegiate wrestling
Representing the Oklahoma State Cowboys
NCAA Division I Championships
Gold medal – first place	2008 St. Louis	133 lb
Silver medal – second place	2007 Auburn Hills	133 lb
Big 12 Championships
Gold medal – first place	2005 Omaha	125 lb
Gold medal – first place	2007 Columbia	133 lb
Silver medal – second place	2006 Ames	125 lb
Bronze medal – third place	2008 Stillwater	133 lb

Coleman Scott (born April 19, 1986) is a former American wrestler for Sunkist Kids who won the 2012 U.S. Olympic Trials and a special Championship Series at 60 kg freestyle to qualify to compete at the 2012 Olympics. He won the bronze medal at the 2012 Summer Olympics in the men's freestyle 60 kg category. In 2024, Scott was inducted into the National Wrestling Hall of Fame as a Distinguished Member.

== High school ==
Coleman attended Waynesburg Central High School in Pennsylvania where he had a record of 156-12 and was a four-time WPIAL champion and three-time PIAA Class AAA state champion. His performance in 2004 earned him the Junior Schalles Award, for being the top high school pinner.

== College ==
As an Oklahoma State wrestler, Coleman was a four-time All-American and the 2008 NCAA Champion at 133-pounds.

== International ==
Coleman won the 2012 U.S. Olympic Trials, but unlike many of his fellow competitors this did not automatically earn him an Olympic bid. Since the U.S. had not yet qualified in the 60 kg freestyle and since the qualification tournaments were near in time to the trials, two wrestlers were selected to skip the trials and try to qualify the U.S. at that weight. After the U.S. qualified for that weight, a special best-of-three Championship Series at Times Square was arranged allowing the trials winner to compete against the two wrestlers at the qualification tournaments for the Olympic spot. Coleman defeated Reece Humphrey in the semi-final. Coleman then defeated Shawn Bunch 2 to 1 the special best-of-three Championship Series final for the 60 kg spot.

At the 2012 Summer Olympics, Scott beat Lee Seung-Chul and Malkhaz Zarkua before losing to eventual champion Toghrul Asgarov. In the repechage, Scott won the bronze medal by beating Kenichi Yumoto.

== Coaching ==
In 2015, Scott was named head coach of the University of North Carolina wrestling program after one year as an assistant.

In 2023, Scott was named associate head coach of the Oklahoma State University wrestling program.

== Honors ==
Scott was inducted as a Distinguished Member of the National Wrestling Hall of Fame in 2024
