= Ghenadie Tulbea =

Olympic wrestler (born 1979)

Personal information
- Full name: Ghenadie Tulbea
- Nationality: Moldova; Monaco
- Born: 3 March 1982 (age 44) Talmaza, Ştefan Vodă, Moldavian SSR, Soviet Union
- Height: 1.55 m (5 ft 1 in)
- Weight: 55 kg (121 lb)

Sport
- Style: Freestyle
- Club: Olimpia Chișinău (2001–2002); Dinamo Chișinău (2003–2008); ACM Monaco (2008–)
- Coach: Nicolae Oreol (2001–2008); Grigori Buliga (2008–)
Medal record
Men's freestyle wrestling
Representing Moldova
World Championships
Silver medal – second place	2003 New York	55 kg
European Championships
Gold medal – first place	2001 Budapest	54 kg
Gold medal – first place	2005 Varna	55 kg
Silver medal – second place	2002 Baku	54 kg
Representing Monaco
European Championships
Silver medal – second place	2014 Vantaa	57 kg

Ghenadie Tulbea (born 3 March 1979) is an amateur Moldovan and Monegasque freestyle wrestler, who competed in the men's flyweight category. He has held two European Championship titles (2001 and 2005) and a silver medal in the same division at the 2003 World Wrestling Championships in New York, New York, United States, and later represented his nation Moldova at the 2004 Summer Olympics. Throughout his sporting career, Tulbea has been training under his personal coach and mentor Nicolae Oreol for the Olympic Sports Club (Romanian: Olimpiu de club sportiv) in Chișinău before he transferred his residency to Monaco and played for the wrestling team in 2010.

Tulbea qualified for Moldova in the men's 55 kg class at the 2004 Summer Olympics in Athens by placing second behind Uzbekistan's Dilshod Mansurov from the World Wrestling Championships in New York, New York, United States. He was placed by a random draw into a three-man preliminary pool against Cuba's René Montero and United States' Stephen Abas. At the end of the pool, Tulbea lost two straight matches each to Montero (0–5) and Abas (1–6) with a single classification and technical point, finishing only in third place and twenty-first overall in the final standings.

At the 2005 European Wrestling Championships in Varna, Bulgaria, Tulbea outclassed the host nation's strong contender Radoslav Velikov to capture the flyweight title, adding it to his gold medal from the same tournament in 2001. Moldova's prime minister Vasile Tarlev also congratulated him for his tremendous triumph at the European Championships, mentioning that "his success has finally made the country's image to the world and his performance has become a model for the young generation".

In 2008, Tulbea sought his bid to compete for his second Olympics in Beijing, but finished farther from the mandatory slots in two successive Olympic Qualification Tournaments. Shortly after the bid, Tulbea announced his early retirement from the sporting career, citing personal reasons and problems with injuries that did not allow him to train and perform adequately. Tulbea eventually worked as an assistant coach for the Moldovan wrestling team, until he made a final decision to gain a dual residency status upon his immediate transfer to Monaco in 2009.

Coming out of retirement, Tulbea officially became part of the Monegasque wrestling team in 2010, and has been currently training under his new coach Grigori Buliga for Automobile Club de Monaco. He made his debut for Monaco at the World Championships, but was surprisingly beaten in the opening match by Belarus' Rizvan Gadzhiev. The following year, at the 2011 European Wrestling Championships in Dortmund, Germany, Tulbea pulled off a courageous fight for his new squad with a top finish in the men's flyweight division, but lost the bronze medal match to another Belarusian Uladzislau Andreyeu.
