= 2014 European Wrestling Championships – Men's freestyle 57 kg =

Wrestling competitions

The men's freestyle 57 kg is a competition featured at the 2014 European Wrestling Championships, and was held in Vantaa, Finland on April 2.

== Medalists ==
Gold	Vladimer Khinchegashvili; Georgia
Silver	Ghenadie Tulbea; Monaco
Bronze	Garik Barseghyan; Armenia
Bronze	Zoheir El-Ouarraqe; France

== Results ==
Legend

- F — Won by fall

=== Main bracket ===
Round of 16
Ghenadie Tulbea (MON)	14
Garik Barseghyan (ARM)	13
Vladislav Andreev (BLR)	11
József Molnár (HUN)	0
Andrei Dukov (ROU)	4
Levan Vartanov (ESP)	1
Manuel Wolfer (GER)	6
Zoheir El-Ouarraqe (FRA)	11
Georgi Vangelov (BUL)	2
Vladimer Khinchegashvili (GEO)	6
Sezar Akgül (TUR)	7
Clim Grec (MDA)	2
Sergey Ratushniy (UKR)	0
Rustam Ampar (RUS)	8

Quarterfinals
Galib Aliyev (AZE)	6
Ghenadie Tulbea (MON)	5^{F}
Vladislav Andreev (BLR)	4
Andrei Dukov (ROU)	5
Zoheir El-Ouarraqe (FRA)	4
Vladimer Khinchegashvili (GEO)	7
Sezar Akgül (TUR)	3
Rustam Ampar (RUS)	8

Semifinals
Ghenadie Tulbea (MON)	6
Andrei Dukov (ROU)	3
Vladimer Khinchegashvili (GEO)	6
Rustam Ampar (RUS)	4

Final
Ghenadie Tulbea (MON)	1
Vladimer Khinchegashvili (GEO)	5

=== Repechage ===
Repechage round 1
Garik Barseghyan (ARM)	4
Galib Aliyev (AZE)	1
Georgi Vangelov (BUL)	5
Zoheir El-Ouarraqe (FRA)	6

Bronze medals
Garik Barseghyan (ARM)	3
Andrei Dukov (ROU)	1
Zoheir El-Ouarraqe (FRA)	3
Rustam Ampar (RUS)	3
