= Tskhiloni =

Tskhiloni Georgian: ცხილონი, Iron Ossetic: Цхилон/Антъоныхъæу
- Village
- Location in Georgia Tskhiloni (Georgia)
- Coordinates: 42°05′07″N 44°22′32″E
- Country: (Georgia (country)) Georgia
- Region: Mtskheta-Mtianeti
- Municipality: Akhalgori Municipality
- Time zone: UTC+4 (Georgian Time)

Tskhiloni (Georgian: ცხილონი, Iron Ossetic: Цхилон, also known as Антъоныхъæу) is an Ossetian village in Akhalgori Municipality, Mtskheta-Mtianeti Georgia. Village has two parts — Zemo (Upper) Tskhiloni and Kvemo (Lower) Tskhiloni.

== Notable people ==
- Besik Kudukhov, a freestyle wrestling Olympic Games champion.
