= René Montero =

Cuban freestyle wrestler

Personal information
- Full name: René Montero Rosales
- Nationality: Cuba
- Born: 23 November 1979 (age 46) Santiago de Cuba, Cuba
- Height: 1.63 m (5 ft 4 in)
- Weight: 55 kg (121 lb)

Sport
- Style: Freestyle
- Club: CEAR Cuba
- Coach: Filiberto Delgado
Medal record
Men's freestyle wrestling
Representing Cuba
World Championships
Gold medal – first place	2002 Tehran	55 kg
Pan American Games
Silver medal – second place	2003 Santo Domingo	55 kg
Central American and Caribbean Games
Gold medal – first place	2006 Cartagena	55 kg

René Montero Rosales (born November 23, 1979, in Santiago de Cuba) is a retired amateur Cuban freestyle wrestler, who competed in the men's flyweight category. He has been named a 2002 World freestyle wrestling champion; a silver medalist at the 2003 Pan American Games, and later represented his nation Cuba at the 2004 Summer Olympics. Throughout his sporting career, Montero has been training under his personal coach and mentor Filiberto Delgado for CEAR Cuba.

Montero made sporting headlines in 2002, when he strongly defeated Azerbaijani wrestler and defending Olympic champion Namig Abdullayev for the gold medal n the men's 55 kg class at the World Championships in Tehran. The following year, at the 2003 Pan American Games in Santo Domingo, Dominican Republic, Montero could not generate a similar record from his previous tournament after losing out a final match to U.S. wrestler Stephen Abas with a classification score of 1–3.

Montero qualified for Cuba in the men's 55 kg class at the 2004 Summer Olympics in Athens by placing first and receiving an automatic berth from the Olympic Qualification Tournament in Bratislava, Slovakia. He was placed by a random draw into a three-man preliminary pool against his formidable opponent Abas and Moldova's Ghenadie Tulbea. Montero easily outclassed Tulbea (0–5) in their opening pool match, before he could not recover from a setback with another tight, arduous loss to Abas (3–4), finishing only in second place with a record of eight technical points and thirteenth overall in the final standings.

At the 2006 Central American and Caribbean Games in Cartagena, Colombia, Montero sealed a success with a prestigious triumph and a gold medal over the host nation's Freddy Serrano in the same division with a technical score of 7–0 and a classification tally of 3–0.
