= Stephen Abas =

American wrestler and mixed martial artist (born 1978)

- Born: January 12, 1978 (age 48); Santa Ana, California, U.S.
- Nationality: American
- Height: 5 ft 5 in (1.65 m)
- Weight: 135 lb (61 kg)
- Division: Bantamweight
- Style: Wrestling
- Team: The Arena
- Wrestling: NCAA Division I Champion (1999, 2001, 2002)

Mixed martial arts record
- Total: 3
- Wins: 3
- By knockout: 1
- By submission: 0
- By decision: 2
- By disqualification: 0
- Losses: 0
- By knockout: 0
- By submission: 0
- By decision: 0
- By disqualification: 0
- Draws: 0
- No contests: 0

Other information
- University: Fresno State University
- Mixed martial arts record from Sherdog
Medal record
Men's freestyle wrestling
Representing the United States
Olympic Games
Silver medal – second place	2004 Athens	55 kg
World Cup
Gold medal – first place	2005 Tashkent	55 kg
Gold medal – first place	2003 Boise	55 kg
Gold medal – first place	2002 Spokane	55 kg
Pan American Games
Gold medal – first place	2003 Santo Domingo	55 kg
Junior World Championships
Gold medal – first place	1998 Las Vegas	56 kg
Cadet World Championships
Bronze medal – third place	1994 Frankfort	51 kg
Collegiate Wrestling
Representing the Fresno State Bulldogs
NCAA Division I Championships
Gold medal – first place	1999 State College	125 lb
Gold medal – first place	2001 Iowa City	125 lb
Gold medal – first place	2002 Albany	125 lb

Stephen Anthony Abas (born January 12, 1978) is an American Olympic freestyle wrestler and mixed martial artist. Abas became a three-time NCAA Division I wrestling champion in the 125 lb (57 kg) weight division while attending Fresno State University. He has competed in two world freestyle championships and received a silver medal at the 2004 Olympic Games.

== Early life ==
Abas graduated from James Logan High School as a star wrestler. During high school, Abas was a three-time California wrestling state champion. Prior to JLHS he attended Canyon Springs High School in Moreno Valley. He and his brother Gerry Abas were members of the Wan Tu Wazuri wrestling club at Oakland Technical High School in Oakland.

== College career ==
Wrestling for Fresno State from 1998 to 2002, he earned four All-American honors and three National Championships at the NCAA DI wrestling championships. Abas placed fourth in the 118-pound weight class as a freshman and won the next three years in the 125-pound (57 kg) weight class. He finished his college career with a 144–4 record, with 46 pins, going undefeated his last three college seasons at 125 pounds. Voted top 15 wrestlers in NCAA history.

== International wrestling career ==
Abas also is a decorated freestyle wrestler; winning gold medal at the 2003 Pan American Games after defeating current Cuban world champion René Montero, competing in two world freestyle championships where in 2003 he stopped current Azerbaijani Olympic champion Namig Abdullayev and future twice Russian Olympic champion Mavlet Batirov, receiving a silver medal at the 2004 Olympic Games. At the 2005 NCAA championships, he was named as one of the fifteen greatest wrestlers in NCAA history, alongside other standouts such as Kurt Angle, Cael Sanderson, and Dan Gable. Abas was also elected to the NCAA 75th Anniversary Wrestling Team.

Abas tried out for the 2008 USA Olympic Team and reached the finals of the Olympic Trials, losing to Henry Cejudo in a best-of-3 series, 2 matches to 1, even though he competed with a damaged knee. In 2008, he retired from competitive wrestling.

== Mixed martial arts career ==
He began an MMA career. He teaches and trains out of The Arena MMA gym in San Diego, alongside other notable athletes such as Diego Sanchez, Joe Duarte, Rani Yahya, K. J. Noons, Fabricio Camoes, and Xande Ribeiro.

=== MMA record ===
Professional record breakdown
3 matches	3 wins	0 losses
By knockout	1	0
By decision	2	0

Res.	Record	Opponent	Method	Event	Date	Round	Time	Location	Notes
Win	3-0	Clint Gerona	TKO (Retirement)	Rebel Fighter – Annihilation	August 13, 2011	3	5:00	Amador County Fairgrounds, Plymouth, California	
Win	2-0	Joey de la Cruz	Decision (Unanimous)	TPF 5: Stars and Strikes	September 7, 2010	3	3:00	Tachi Palace Hotel and Casino, Lemoore, California	
Win	1-0	Sam Stevens-Milo	Decision (Majority)	TPF 4: Cinco de Mayhem	May 5, 2010	3	3:00	Tachi Palace Hotel and Casino, Lemoore, California	Bantamweight debut

== Personal life ==
In 2009, Abas was inducted into the Fresno County Athletic Hall of Fame. In 2018, Abas was inducted into the National Wrestling Hall of Fame as a Distinguished Member.
