= Mike Zadick =

American wrestler (born 1978)

Personal information
- Full name: Michael Najeeb Zadick
- Born: July 12, 1978 (age 48) Great Falls, Montana, U.S.

Sport
- Country: United States
- Sport: Wrestling
- Events: Freestyle and Folkstyle
- College team: Iowa
- Club: Hawkeye Wrestling Club
- Team: USA
- Coached by: Jim Zalesky
Medal record
Representing United States
Men's freestyle wrestling
World Championships
Silver medal – second place	2006 Guangzhou	60 kg
Pan American Games
Silver medal – second place	2007 Rio de Janeiro	60 kg
Pan American Championships
Bronze medal – third place	2008 Colorado Springs	60 kg
Men's collegiate wrestling
Representing the Iowa Hawkeyes
NCAA Division I Championships
Bronze medal – third place	2001 Iowa City	149 lb
Big Ten Championships
Gold medal – first place	2002 Champaign	149 lb

Michael Najeeb Zadick (born July 12, 1978) is an American former folkstyle and freestyle wrestler. He competed in the Men's freestyle 60 kg division at the 2008 Summer Olympics. He lost in the 1/8 finals to Vasyl Fedoryshyn.

== International wrestling career ==
As a freestyle wrestler, Zadick won a silver medal at 2006 FILA Wrestling World Championships in Guangzhou, China, defeating two-time Olympic champion Mavlet Batirov in the semi-final. He is also a two-time champion at 60 kg at the Dave Schultz Memorial International Championship (2006 and 2010). In 2007, Zadick failed to place at the 2007 FILA Wrestling World Championships in Baku, Azerbaijan. He was the silver medalist at the 2007 Pan American Games in Rio de Janeiro, Brazil. Zadick also represented the USA at the 2008 Summer Olympics in Beijing, China.

As a youth wrestler, Zadick had national success competing in USA Wrestling age-group events in both freestyle and Greco-Roman styles. He placed fourth in the 1994 Cadet World Championships in Greco-Roman, and was the 1996 Junior Nationals champion in both freestyle and Greco-Roman. In 1997, he was Junior Nationals runner-up in freestyle and Junior Nationals champion in Greco-Roman. He was named Outstanding Wrestler in Freestyle at the 1996 Junior Nationals.

== College wrestling career ==
Zadick was a three-time all-American wrestler (2000–02) at the University of Iowa, winning the 149-pound Big Ten Conference title in 2002. He finished seventh in the 2000 and 2002 NCAA Tournaments, and third in the 2001 NCAA Tournament.

He earned a bachelor's degree from Iowa in 2002 in Health, Leisure, and Sport Studies.

== High school wrestling career ==
Zadick wrestled at Great Falls High School in Great Falls, Montana. He was a four-time Montana state champion, which he accomplished in four different weight classes: 103 pounds (1994), 119 pounds (1995), 125 pounds (1996) and 135 pounds (1997). Three of his state championships (1995–97) capped undefeated seasons.

Zadick finished his high school career with Montana state high school wrestling records for most career wins (154) and consecutive wins (122). He is third on the state record list for most falls (101). He was named an ASICS Tiger High School First-Team All-American in 1997.

== Coaching career ==
Zadick was an assistant Coach at Iowa State University for two years after spending 4 years (2012-2016) as an assistant coach at Virginia Tech. He previously spent 10 years on the staff at the University of Iowa head coach Tom Brands. He served for two years as the interim assistant coach (2010-2012), four years as the team's volunteer assistant coach (2004–06, 2009-2010), and previously served as the Hawkeyes' strength training coach for three seasons (2006–08). During his tenure, Iowa has won two NCAA national championships (2008–09), and two Big Ten Conference team titles (2008–09). The Hawkeyes have crowned three NCAA champions, four Big Ten champions, 24 all-Americans and 28 academic all-Big Ten honorees.

== Personal information ==
Mike and his older brother, Bill Zadick, are part of the University of Iowa's tradition of brothers competing for the Hawkeyes. Bill was the 2006 World Champion at 145.5 pounds (66 kg) and a two-time all-American for the Hawkeyes, winning a Big Ten and NCAA title at 142 pounds in 1996. Bill also served as Iowa's volunteer assistant coach for the 2003 and 2004 seasons.
