= Wrestling at the 2002 Asian Games – Men's freestyle 55 kg =

Men's freestyle 55 kg at the 2002 Asian Games
- Venue: Yangsan Gymnasium
- Date: 6–7 October 2002
- Competitors: 13 from 13 nations

Medalists
gold medal	Dilshod Mansurov	Uzbekistan
silver medal	Chikara Tanabe	Japan
bronze medal	Mohammad Rezaei	Iran

The men's freestyle 55 kilograms wrestling competition at the 2002 Asian Games in Busan was held on 6 October and 7 October at the Yangsan Gymnasium.

The competition held with an elimination system of three or four wrestlers in each pool, with the winners qualify for the semifinals and final by way of direct elimination.

== Schedule ==
All times are Korea Standard Time (UTC+09:00)

Date	Time	Event
Sunday, 6 October 2002	10:00	Round 1
Sunday, 6 October 2002	16:00	Round 2
Sunday, 6 October 2002	16:00	Round 3
Monday, 7 October 2002	10:00	1/2 finals
Monday, 7 October 2002	16:00	Finals

== Results ==
=== Preliminary ===
==== Pool 1 ====
Pos	Athlete	Pld	W	L	CP	TP	Qualification
1	Mohammad Rezaei (IRI)	2	2	0	6	9	Knockout round
2	Bayaraagiin Naranbaatar (MGL)	2	1	1	4	9	
3	Kim Jong-dae (KOR)	2	0	2	2	8	

Source: Report

	Score		CP
Mohammad Rezaei (IRI)	5–2	Bayaraagiin Naranbaatar (MGL)	3–1 PP
Kim Jong-dae (KOR)	2–4	Mohammad Rezaei (IRI)	1–3 PP
Bayaraagiin Naranbaatar (MGL)	7–6	Kim Jong-dae (KOR)	3–1 PP

==== Pool 2 ====
Pos	Athlete	Pld	W	L	CP	TP	Qualification
1	Dilshod Mansurov (UZB)	2	2	0	8	23	Knockout round
2	Firas Al-Rifaei (SYR)	2	1	1	5	11	
3	Abdulqader Omar (QAT)	2	0	2	0	0	

Source: Report

	Score		CP
Abdulqader Omar (QAT)	0–10 Fall	Firas Al-Rifaei (SYR)	0–4 TO
Dilshod Mansurov (UZB)	12–0	Abdulqader Omar (QAT)	4–0 ST
Firas Al-Rifaei (SYR)	1–11	Dilshod Mansurov (UZB)	1–4 SP

==== Pool 3 ====
Pos	Athlete	Pld	W	L	CP	TP	Qualification
1	Maulen Mamyrov (KAZ)	2	2	0	7	22	Knockout round
2	Kim Dae-ha (PRK)	2	1	1	5	18	
3	Abdullah Al-Hakem (YEM)	2	0	2	0	0	

Source: Report

	Score		CP
Abdullah Al-Hakem (YEM)	0–10	Kim Dae-ha (PRK)	0–4 ST
Maulen Mamyrov (KAZ)	10–0	Abdullah Al-Hakem (YEM)	4–0 ST
Kim Dae-ha (PRK)	8–12	Maulen Mamyrov (KAZ)	1–3 PP

==== Pool 4 ====
Pos	Athlete	Pld	W	L	CP	TP	Qualification
1	Chikara Tanabe (JPN)	3	3	0	10	19	Knockout round
2	Nurdin Donbaev (KGZ)	3	2	1	7	9	
3	Kripa Shankar Patel (IND)	3	1	2	4	10	
4	Rowşan Seýidow (TKM)	3	0	3	1	5	

Source: Report

	Score		CP
Nurdin Donbaev (KGZ)	2–3	Chikara Tanabe (JPN)	1–3 PP
Rowşan Seýidow (TKM)	5–8	Kripa Shankar Patel (IND)	1–3 PP
Nurdin Donbaev (KGZ)	3–0	Rowşan Seýidow (TKM)	3–0 PO
Chikara Tanabe (JPN)	6–2	Kripa Shankar Patel (IND)	3–1 PP
Nurdin Donbaev (KGZ)	4–0	Kripa Shankar Patel (IND)	3–0 PO
Chikara Tanabe (JPN)	10–0 Fall	Rowşan Seýidow (TKM)	4–0 TO

=== Knockout round ===
1/2 finals
Mohammad Rezaei (IRI)	0
Dilshod Mansurov (UZB)	11
Maulen Mamyrov (KAZ)	2
Chikara Tanabe (JPN)	4

Final
Dilshod Mansurov (UZB)	3
Chikara Tanabe (JPN)	1
3rd–4th place
Mohammad Rezaei (IRI)	10
Maulen Mamyrov (KAZ)	0

== Final standing ==
Rank	Athlete
1st place, gold medalist(s)	Dilshod Mansurov (UZB)
2nd place, silver medalist(s)	Chikara Tanabe (JPN)
3rd place, bronze medalist(s)	Mohammad Rezaei (IRI)
4	Maulen Mamyrov (KAZ)
5	Nurdin Donbaev (KGZ)
6	Kim Dae-ha (PRK)
7	Firas Al-Rifaei (SYR)
8	Kripa Shankar Patel (IND)
9	Bayaraagiin Naranbaatar (MGL)
10	Kim Jong-dae (KOR)
11	Rowşan Seýidow (TKM)
12	Abdulqader Omar (QAT)
13	Abdullah Al-Hakem (YEM)
