= Wrestling at the 2010 Commonwealth Games – Men's freestyle 60 kg =

Men's freestyle 60 kg competition at the 2010 Commonwealth Games in New Delhi, India, was held on 9 October at the Indira Gandhi Arena.

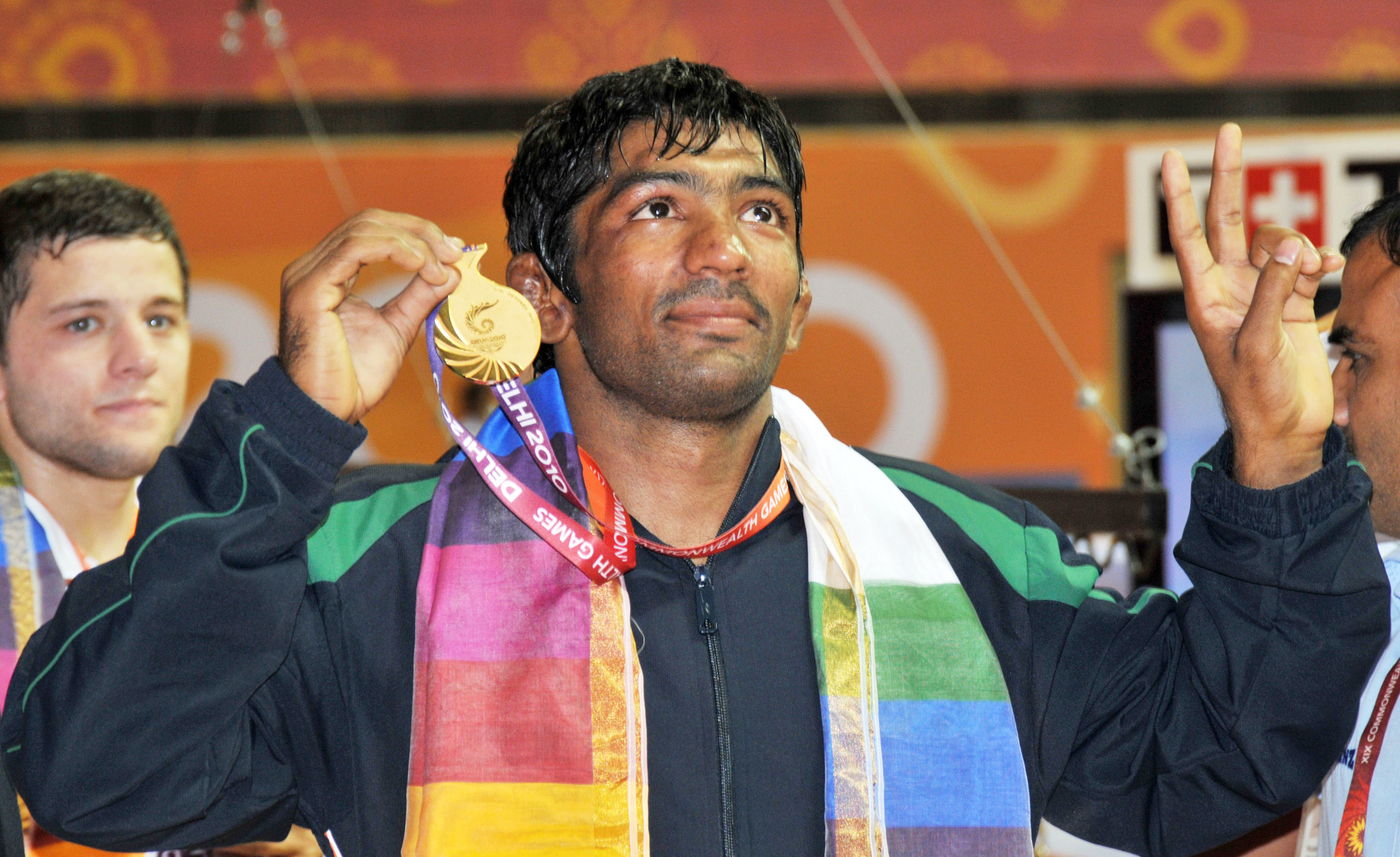
XIX Commonwealth Games-2010 Delhi Yogeshwar Dutt of India won the gold medal in (Men’s) Wrestling 60Kg Freestyle, at Indira Gandhi Stadium, in New Delhi on 9 October 2010

== Medalists ==
Gold	Yogeshwar Dutt; India
Silver	James Mancini; Canada
Bronze	Sasha Madyarchyk; England

=== Bracket ===
Preliminary
Sasha Madyarchyk (ENG)	0	0	0
A.S.S.D Kumara (SRI)	0	0	0
Damion Arzu (WAL)	0	0	0
Marius Loots (RSA)	2	0	0
Farzad Tarash (AUS)	0	0	0
Yogeshwar Dutt (IND)	6	7	0

Quarterfinals
Sarmad Afaq (PAK)	1	1	0
Viorel Etko (SCO)	2	1	0
James Mancini (CAN)	0	1	1
Danial Amas (NGR)	2	0	0
Davis Tumto (KEN)	0	0	0
Sasha Madyarchyk (ENG)	3	0	0
Marius Loots (RSA)	1	0	0
Yogeshwar Dutt (IND)	7	0	0

Semifinals
Viroel Etko (SCO)	0	0	0
James Mancini (CAN)	1	1	0
Sasha Madyarchyk (ENG)	0	4	0
Yogeshwar Dutt (IND)	4	8	0

Final
James Mancini (CAN)	1	1	0
Yogeshwar Dutt (IND)	3	6	0

=== Repechage ===
Repechage round 1
Farzad Tarash (AUS)	0	0
Marius Loots (RSA)	0	0

Repechage round 2
Danial Amas (NGR)	3	3
Viroel Etko (SCO)	1	0
Marius Loots (RSA)	4	0
Sasha Madyarchyk (ENG)	5	0

Bronze medals
Danial Amas (NGR)	2	4
Sasha Madyarchyk (ENG)	2	3
Danial Amas (NGR)	2	4
Sasha Madyarchyk (ENG)	2	0
