= Wrestling at the 2012 Summer Olympics – Men's freestyle 60 kg =

Men's freestyle 60 kg at the Games of the XXX Olympiad
- Venue: ExCeL London
- Date: 11 August 2012
- Competitors: 19 from 19 nations

Medalists
1st place, gold medalist(s)		Toghrul Asgarov	Azerbaijan
2nd place, silver medalist(s)		Besik Kudukhov	Russia
3rd place, bronze medalist(s)		Coleman Scott	United States
3rd place, bronze medalist(s)		Yogeshwar Dutt	India

Men's freestyle 60 kilograms competition at the 2012 Summer Olympics in London, United Kingdom, took place on 11 August at ExCeL London. This freestyle wrestling competition consisted of a single-elimination tournament, with a repechage used to determine the winners of two bronze medals. The two finalists faced off for gold and silver medals. Each wrestler who lost to one of the two finalists moved into the repechage, culminating in a pair of bronze medal matches featuring the semifinal losers each facing the remaining repechage opponent from their half of the bracket.

Each bout consisted of up to three rounds, lasting two minutes apiece. The wrestler who scored more points in each round was the winner of that rounds; the bout finished when one wrestler had won two rounds (and thus the match).

On 29 August 2016, a report indicated that a retested sample for silver medalist Besik Kudukhov taken at the time of this event had returned a positive result (later disclosed as dehydrochlormethyltestosterone). On 27 October 2016, the IOC stated that they were unaware that Kudukhov had died in a car accident in December 2013 at the time the decision to include his samples in the re-analysis process was made. Since such proceedings cannot be conducted against a deceased person, the IOC dropped all disciplinary proceedings against him. As a result, Olympic results that would most likely have been reviewed will remain uncorrected.

== Schedule ==
All times are British Summer Time (UTC+01:00)

Date	Time	Event
11 August 2012	13:00	Qualification rounds
11 August 2012	17:45	Repechage
11 August 2012	18:30	Finals

== Results ==
Legend

- F — Won by fall

=== Final ===
Final
Toghrul Asgarov (AZE)	1	5
Besik Kudukhov (RUS)	0	0

=== Top half ===
Qualifications

1/8 finals
Lee Seung-chul (KOR)	0	0
Coleman Scott (USA)	3	3
Malkhaz Zarkua (GEO)	2	3
Vasyl Fedoryshyn (UKR)	0	0
Yowlys Bonne (CUB)	2	0
Kenichi Yumoto (JPN)	2	2
Toghrul Asgarov (AZE)	2	7
Tim Schleicher (GER)	0	1

1/4 finals
Coleman Scott (USA)	1	7^{F}
Malkhaz Zarkua (GEO)	0	0
Kenichi Yumoto (JPN)	0	2
Toghrul Asgarov (AZE)	1	2

Semifinals
Coleman Scott (USA)	0	0
Toghrul Asgarov (AZE)	1	4

=== Bottom half ===
Qualifications
Masoud Esmaeilpour (IRI)	6	2
Guillermo Torres (MEX)	0	1
Anatolie Guidea (BUL)	1	0	2
Yogeshwar Dutt (IND)	0	2	5
Franklin Gómez (PUR)	2	0	0
Besik Kudukhov (RUS)	2	1	1

1/8 finals
Hassan Madani (EGY)	3	0	4
Didier Païs (FRA)	0	2	4
Farzad Tarash (AUS)	0	0
Ri Jong-myong (PRK)	3	5
Dauren Zhumagaziyev (KAZ)	4	1	0
Masoud Esmaeilpour (IRI)	1	4	4
Yogeshwar Dutt (IND)	0	0
Besik Kudukhov (RUS)	1	2

1/4 finals
Hassan Madani (EGY)	0	2	0
Ri Jong-myong (PRK)	1	1	4
Masoud Esmaeilpour (IRI)	0	1	0
Besik Kudukhov (RUS)	4	0	1

Semifinals
Ri Jong-myong (PRK)	0	0
Besik Kudukhov (RUS)	2	3

=== Repechage ===
Repechage round 1
Franklin Gómez (PUR)	0	0
Yogeshwar Dutt (IND)	1	1

Repechage round 2
Tim Schleicher (GER)	0	2
Kenichi Yumoto (JPN)	6	3
Yogeshwar Dutt (IND)	0	3	4
Masoud Esmaeilpour (IRI)	3	2	0

Bronze medals
Kenichi Yumoto (JPN)	1	0	1
Coleman Scott (USA)	0	3	3
Yogeshwar Dutt (IND)	0	1	6
Ri Jong-myong (PRK)	1	0	0

== Final standing ==
Rank	Athlete
1st place, gold medalist(s)	Toghrul Asgarov (AZE)
2nd place, silver medalist(s)	Besik Kudukhov (RUS)
3rd place, bronze medalist(s)	Coleman Scott (USA)
3rd place, bronze medalist(s)	Yogeshwar Dutt (IND)
5	Kenichi Yumoto (JPN)
5	Ri Jong-myong (PRK)
7	Masoud Esmaeilpour (IRI)
8	Hassan Madani (EGY)
9	Malkhaz Zarkua (GEO)
10	Tim Schleicher (GER)
11	Didier Païs (FRA)
12	Dauren Zhumagaziyev (KAZ)
13	Anatolie Guidea (BUL)
14	Yowlys Bonne (CUB)
15	Franklin Gómez (PUR)
16	Guillermo Torres (MEX)
17	Vasyl Fedoryshyn (UKR)
18	Lee Seung-chul (KOR)
19	Farzad Tarash (AUS)
