= 2013 European Wrestling Championships – Men's freestyle 60 kg =

The men's freestyle 60 kg is a competition featured at the 2013 European Wrestling Championships, and was held at the Tbilisi Sports Palace in Tbilisi, Georgia on 20 March 2013.

== Medalists ==
Gold	Opan Sat; Russia
Silver	Vladimir Dubov; Bulgaria
Bronze	Vladimer Khinchegashvili; Georgia
Bronze	Tim Schleicher; Germany

== Results ==
Legend

- F — Won by fall

=== Final ===
Final
Opan Sat (RUS)	1	2
Vladimir Dubov (BUL)	0	1

=== Top Half ===
Round of 32

Round of 16
Krzysztof Bieńkowski (POL)	0	0
Münir Recep Aktaş (TUR)	1	1
Opan Sat (RUS)	3	7
Andrei Komar (BLR)	0	0
Aleksei Baskakov (EST)	0	0
Vladimer Khinchegashvili (GEO)	3	8
József Molnár (HUN)	0	0
Haji Aliyev (AZE)	5	4

Quarterfinals
Münir Recep Aktaş (TUR)	0	0
Opan Sat (RUS)	4	6
Vladimer Khinchegashvili (GEO)	1	2	3
Haji Aliyev (AZE)	0	6	1

Semifinals
Opan Sat (RUS)	6	1
Vladimer Khinchegashvili (GEO)	0	0

=== Bottom Half ===
Round of 32
Mykola Aivazian (UKR)	1	3
Narek Sanoyan (ARM)	0	1
Maximilian Ausserleitner (AUT)	0	0
Vladimir Dubov (BUL)	4	7

Round of 16
Šarūnas Jurčys (LTU)	0	0
Tim Schleicher (GER)	6	7
Yunier Castillo (ESP)	1	0	3
Ion Drucenschi (MDA)	0	1	3
Mykola Bolotňuk (SVK)	3	1
Ivan Guidea (MDA)	1	0
Mykola Aivazian (UKR)	0	1
Vladimir Dubov (BUL)	3	4

Quarterfinals
Tim Schleicher (GER)	3	1
Yunier Castillo (ESP)	2	0
Mykola Bolotňuk (SVK)	0	1
Vladimir Dubov (BUL)	1	3

Semifinals
Tim Schleicher (GER)	1	0
Vladimir Dubov (BUL)	2	1

=== Repechage ===
Repechage round 1
Maximilian Ausserleitner (AUT)	0	0
Mykola Aivazian (UKR)	7	6

Repechage round 2
Andrei Komar (BLR)	0	1
Münir Recep Aktaş (TUR)	2	2
Mykola Aivazian (UKR)	2	1	4
Mykola Bolotňuk (SVK)	0	1	0

Bronze medals
Münir Recep Aktaş (TUR)	1	0
Vladimer Khinchegashvili (GEO)	3	6
Mykola Aivazian (UKR)	5	1	1
Tim Schleicher (GER)	0	7	2
