= Cengizhan Erdoğan =

Turkish-Russian wrestler (born 1987)

Opan Sat Опан Сат
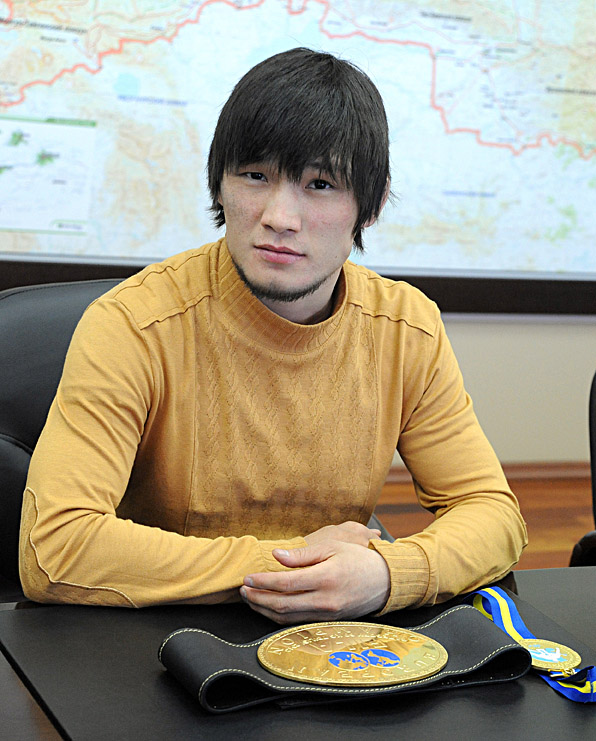

Personal information
- Native name: Опан Владимирович Сат
- Full name: Opan Vladamirovich Sat
- Nationality: (Russia) Russian (Turkey) Turkish
- Born: June 13, 1987 (age 39) Chadan, Tyva Republic, Russia
- Height: 172 cm (5 ft 8 in)

Sport
- Country: Russia (until 2013); Turkey (since 2014)
- Sport: Wrestling
- Weight class: 60-65 kg
- Rank: Honored Master of Sports of Russia
- Event: Freestyle
- Club: Mindiashvili Wrestling Academy
- Coached by: Vladimir Tulush (Tuva), Islam Matiev (Chechnya)

Achievements and titles
- World finals: 5th (2017)
- Regional finals: (gold) (2010) (gold) (2011) (gold) (2013)
- National finals: (silver) (2009, 2010) (silver) (2011, 2012) (bronze) (2007, 2013)
Medal record
Men's freestyle wrestling
Representing Russia
European Championships
Gold medal – first place	2013 Tbilisi	60 kg
Gold medal – first place	2011 Dortmund	60 kg
Gold medal – first place	2010 Baku	60 kg
European Juniors Championships
Gold medal – first place	2007 Belgrade	55 kg
Gold medal – first place	2005 Wroclaw	55 kg
Representing Turkey
Yasar Dogu Tournament
Bronze medal – third place	2019 Istanbul	65 kg
Representing Tuva
Russian National Championships
Silver medal – second place	2012 St.Petersburg	60 kg
Silver medal – second place	2011 Yakutsk	60 kg
Silver medal – second place	2010 Volgograd	60 kg
Silver medal – second place	2009 Kazan	60 kg
Bronze medal – third place	2013 Krasnoyarsk	60 kg
Bronze medal – third place	2007 Moscow	55 kg
Golden Grand Prix Ivan Yarygin
Gold medal – first place	2013 Krasnoyarsk	60 kg
Gold medal – first place	2011 Krasnoyarsk	60 kg
Silver medal – second place	2012 Krasnoyarsk	60 kg

Opan Vladamirovich Sat, Cengizhan Erdogan (Turkish name) (Russian: Опан Владимирович Сат; Tuvan: Опан Владимир оглу Сат; born 13 June 1987) is a Russian and Turkish freestyle wrestler who won the gold medals at the 2010, 2011 and 2013 FILA Wrestling European Championships. He first won the title in 2010 and repeated his success in 2011 and 2013. Also, he represented Turkey at the 2017 World Wrestling Championships and finished 5th.

In the 2013 European Wrestling Championships he won the title by defeating Vladimir Dubov of Bulgaria 1–0, 2–1, in two straight periods and thus won his third title. He is International Master of Sports in freestyle wrestling.
