= Zhassulan Mukhtarbekuly =

Kazakhstani freestyle wrestler (born 1984)

Zhassulan Mukhtarbekuly (born 3 April 1984 in Kzyl-Orda) is a male freestyle wrestler from Kazakhstan. He participated in Men's freestyle 55 kg at the 2008 Summer Olympics, where he lost in the Round of 16 to Dilshod Mansurov of Uzbekistan.
