= James Mancini =

Canadian-Italian wrestler and mixed martial arts fighter (born 1984)

Personal information
- Full name: James Michael Mancini
- Nickname: Boom Boom
- Nationality: Canadian, Italian
- Born: September 29, 1984 (age 41)
- Height: 5 ft 6 in (168 cm)
Medal record
Men's freestyle wrestling
Representing Canada
Commonwealth Games
Silver medal – second place	2010 Delhi	60 kg
Pan American Championships
Silver medal – second place	2009 Maracaibo	60 kg
Silver medal – second place	2010 Monterrey	60 kg

James Mancini (born September 29, 1984) is a Canadian-Italian former wrestler and mixed martial artist. He most notably competed as a freestyle wrestler, representing Canada at the 2010 Commonwealth Games, winning a silver medal in the 60 kg category, having lost only to future Olympic medalist Yogeshwar Dutt.

A professional since 2013, Mancini has also competed in mixed martial arts. He most recently fought for Cage Fury Fighting Championships, where he is a former flyweight title challenger. He has also competed in the flyweight division of TKO Major League MMA, where he is a former flyweight title challenger. He is nicknamed Boom Boom.

As of 2023, Mancini was performing as a standup comedian and was the owner of Mauvais Garcons restaurant in Montreal.
