= Afghanistan national amateur boxing athletes =

Afghanistan national amateur boxing

Afghanistan national amateur boxing athletes represents Afghanistan in regional, continental and world amateur boxing tournaments and matches sanctioned by the International Boxing Association (AIBA).

== Olympics ==
=== 2004 Athens Olympics ===
One amateur boxer represented Afghanistan in this edition of the Olympiad. He was defeated in round of 32 bout.

==== Entry list ====
- Basharmal Sultani (Welterweight)

== Asian Games ==
=== 2006 Doha Asian Games ===
Four amateur boxers represented Afghanistanin this edition of the Asiad. This country is ranked 15th in the medal tally table with no medals.

==== Entry list ====
- Mohammad Naim Amini (Light Welterweight)
- Shahzada Hassan (Featherhweight)
- Mohammad Sadeq Mirzaei (Light Heavyweight)
- Rohullah Mustafa (Bantamweight)
- Asadullah Azad (Light Heavyweight)
