= Tim Schleicher =

German freestyle wrestler

Personal information
- Born: 30 December 1988 (age 37) Nuremberg, Germany
- Height: 168 cm (5 ft 6 in)

Sport
- Country: Germany
- Sport: Freestyle wrestling
- Weight class: 60 kg (130 lb)
Medal record
European Championships
Bronze medal – third place	2013 Tbilisi	60 kg

Tim Schleicher (born 30 December 1988, in Nuremberg) is a German freestyle wrestler. He competed in the freestyle 60 kg event at the 2012 Summer Olympics; he lost to Toghrul Asgarov in the 1/8 finals and was eliminated by Kenichi Yumoto in the second repechage round.
