= Sasha Madyarchyk =

English wrestler

Personal information
- Nationality: British (English)
- Born: 9 January 1984 (age 42)
- Height: 168 cm (5 ft 6 in)

Sport
- Sport: Amateur wrestling
- Event: Bantamweight/Featherweight
Medal record
Men's freestyle wrestling
Representing England
Commonwealth Games
Bronze medal – third place	2010 Delhi	60 kg

Sasha Madyarchyk (9 January 1984) is an English former wrestler who won a bronze medal at the 2010 Commonwealth Games

== Biograpghy ==
At the 2010 Commonwealth Games in New Delhi, India, he participated in the Men's 60 kg wrestling event.

Madyarchyk was a four-times winner of the British Wrestling Championships in 2009, 2012, 2013 and 2014.

== See also ==
- England at the 2010 Commonwealth Games
