= O Song-nam =

North Korean freestyle wrestler

Personal information
- Full name: O Song-nam
- Nationality: North Korea
- Born: 16 July 1982 (age 44) Pyongyang, North Korea
- Height: 1.56 m (5 ft 1 1/2 in)
- Weight: 55 kg (121 lb)

Sport
- Style: Freestyle
- Club: North Korea National Team
- Coach: Ri Ho-jin

O Song-nam (Korean: 오성남; born July 16, 1982, in Pyongyang) is a retired amateur North Korean freestyle wrestler, who competed in the men's featherweight category. He finished sixth in the 55-kg division at the 2004 Asian Wrestling Championships in Almaty, Kazakhstan, and later represented his nation North Korea at the Summer Olympics a few months later. O also trained for the national wrestling team, under his personal coach Ri Ho-jin.

O qualified as a lone wrestler for the North Korean squad in the men's featherweight class (55 kg) at the 2004 Summer Olympics in Athens, by receiving a wildcard invitation from the International Federation of Associated Wrestling (FILA). He lost his opening match 3–4 to the host nation's Amiran Kardanov, much to the delight of the home crowd inside Ano Liossa Olympic Hall. Despite a single defeat, O rallied his stretch to edge Armenia's Martin Berberyan off the mat (5–2), and then awarded a free pass to score another triumph, when his other opponent Harun Doğan did not show up on the final bout because of sustained injuries. Finishing second in the prelim pool and eighth overall, O's performance was not enough to advance him to the quarterfinals.
