= Kim Jong-dae =

South Korean freestyle wrestler

- Hangul: 김종대
- Hanja: 金鍾大
- RR: Gim Jongdae
- MR: Kim Chongdae

Kim Jong-dae (born September 21, 1992) is a male freestyle wrestler from South Korea. He participated in Men's freestyle 60 kg at 2008 Summer Olympics losing in the 1/8 of final with Murad Ramazanov.
