= Wrestling at the 2002 Asian Games – Men's Greco-Roman 96 kg =

Men's Greco-Roman 96 kg at the 2002 Asian Games
- Venue: Yangsan Gymnasium
- Date: 3–4 October 2002
- Competitors: 9 from 9 nations

Medalists
gold medal	Aleksey Cheglakov	Uzbekistan
silver medal	Park Myung-suk	South Korea
bronze medal	Masoud Hashemzadeh	Iran

The men's Greco-Roman 96 kilograms wrestling competition at the 2002 Asian Games in Busan was held on 3 October and 4 October at the Yangsan Gymnasium.

The competition held with an elimination system of three or four wrestlers in each pool, with the winners qualify for the semifinals and final by way of direct elimination.

== Schedule ==
All times are Korea Standard Time (UTC+09:00)

Date	Time	Event
Thursday, 3 October 2002	10:00	Round 1
Thursday, 3 October 2002	16:00	Round 2
Friday, 4 October 2002	10:00	Round 3
Friday, 4 October 2002	10:00	Repechage 1
Friday, 4 October 2002	10:00	Repechage 2
Friday, 4 October 2002	10:00	Repechage 3
Friday, 4 October 2002	16:00	1/2 finals
Friday, 4 October 2002	16:00	Finals

== Results ==
=== Preliminary ===
==== Pool 1 ====
Pos	Athlete	Pld	W	L	CP	TP	Qualification
1	Mohammad Al-Haiek (SYR)	2	2	0	7	8	Knockout round
2	Jiang Huachen (CHN)	2	1	1	3	10	Repechage
3	Shodi Bakhromov (TJK)	2	0	2	0	0	

Source: Report

	Score		CP
Mohammad Al-Haiek (SYR)	6–0	Shodi Bakhromov (TJK)	3–0 PO
Jiang Huachen (CHN)	3–2 Fall	Mohammad Al-Haiek (SYR)	0–4 TO
Shodi Bakhromov (TJK)	0–7	Jiang Huachen (CHN)	0–3 PO

==== Pool 2 ====
Pos	Athlete	Pld	W	L	CP	TP	Qualification
1	Aleksey Cheglakov (UZB)	2	2	0	6	8	Knockout round
2	Masoud Hashemzadeh (IRI)	2	1	1	3	3	Repechage
3	Margulan Assembekov (KAZ)	2	0	2	0	0	

Source: Report

	Score		CP
Margulan Assembekov (KAZ)	0–3	Masoud Hashemzadeh (IRI)	0–3 PO
Aleksey Cheglakov (UZB)	4–0	Margulan Assembekov (KAZ)	3–0 PO
Masoud Hashemzadeh (IRI)	0–4	Aleksey Cheglakov (UZB)	0–3 PO

==== Pool 3 ====
Pos	Athlete	Pld	W	L	CP	TP	Qualification
1	Park Myung-suk (KOR)	2	2	0	7	9	Knockout round
2	Yusuke Morikaku (JPN)	2	1	1	4	11	Repechage
3	Dilshot Hadjiev (KGZ)	2	0	2	1	9	

Source: Report

	Score		CP
Yusuke Morikaku (JPN)	10–8	Dilshot Hadjiev (KGZ)	3–1 PP
Park Myung-suk (KOR)	4–1	Yusuke Morikaku (JPN)	3–1 PP
Dilshot Hadjiev (KGZ)	1–5 Ret	Park Myung-suk (KOR)	0–4 PA

=== Repechage ===
Pos	Athlete	Pld	W	L	CP	TP	Qualification
1	Masoud Hashemzadeh (IRI)	2	2	0	6	6	Knockout round
2	Yusuke Morikaku (JPN)	2	1	1	4	11	
3	Jiang Huachen (CHN)	2	0	2	1	1	

Source: Report

	Score		CP
Jiang Huachen (CHN)	1–3	Masoud Hashemzadeh (IRI)	1–3 PP
Yusuke Morikaku (JPN)	11–0	Jiang Huachen (CHN)	4–0 ST
Masoud Hashemzadeh (IRI)	3–0	Yusuke Morikaku (JPN)	3–0 PO

=== Knockout round ===
1/2 finals
Mohammad Al-Haiek (SYR)	1
Aleksey Cheglakov (UZB)	3
Park Myung-suk (KOR)	3
Masoud Hashemzadeh (IRI)	1

Final
Aleksey Cheglakov (UZB)	5
Park Myung-suk (KOR)	0
3rd–4th place
Mohammad Al-Haiek (SYR)	0
Masoud Hashemzadeh (IRI)	4

== Final standing ==
Rank	Athlete
1st place, gold medalist(s)	Aleksey Cheglakov (UZB)
2nd place, silver medalist(s)	Park Myung-suk (KOR)
3rd place, bronze medalist(s)	Masoud Hashemzadeh (IRI)
4	Mohammad Al-Haiek (SYR)
5	Yusuke Morikaku (JPN)
6	Jiang Huachen (CHN)
7	Dilshot Hadjiev (KGZ)
8	Shodi Bakhromov (TJK)
9	Margulan Assembekov (KAZ)
