= Dauren Zhumagaziyev =

Kazakhstani wrestler (born 1989)

Personal information
- Nationality: Kazakhstan
- Born: 18 July 1989 (age 37) Taldykorgan, Kazakh SSR, Soviet Union
- Height: 173 cm (5 ft 8 in)

Sport
- Country: Kazakhstan
- Sport: Wrestling
- Weight class: 60 kg
- Event: Freestyle

Achievements and titles
- Olympic finals: 11th (2012)
- World finals: (bronze) (2011)
- Regional finals: (gold) (2011) (bronze) (2010)
Medal record
Men's freestyle wrestling
Representing Kazakhstan
World Championships
Bronze medal – third place	2011 Istanbul	60 kg
Asian Games
Bronze medal – third place	2010 Guangzhou	60 kg
Asian Championships
Gold medal – first place	2011 Tashkent	60 kg
Bronze medal – third place	2010 New Delhi	60 kg
Asian Juniors Championships
Silver medal – second place	2006 Bangkok	54 kg

Dauren Zhumagaziyev (born 18 July 1989 in Taldykorgan) is a male wrestler from Kazakhstan.
