= Gao Feng (wrestler) =

Chinese freestyle wrestler

Personal information
- Nationality: China
- Born: 18 March 1986 (age 40) China
- Height: 165 cm (5 ft 5 in)

Sport
- Sport: Wrestling
- Event: Freestyle
Medal record
Representing China
Men's Freestyle wrestling
Wrestling at the 2010 Asian Games
| Bronze medal – third place | Asian games 2010 | -66 kg |

Gao Feng (born 1986) is a Freestyle wrestler from People's Republic of China. He won the bronze medal at Asian Games 2010. He also won World Fair Play Award in 2010. Gao Feng became the first Chinese World Fair Play Award winner.

== See also ==
- Asian Games 2010
