= Bauyrzhan Orazgaliyev =

Kazakhstani freestyle wrestler (born 1985)

Bauyrzhan Orazgaliyev (born February 28, 1985) is a male freestyle wrestler from Kazakhstan. He participated in Men's freestyle 60 kg at 2008 Summer Olympics. He was eliminated in the 1/8 of final losing with Yogeshwar Dutt from India.
