= Li Zhengyu =

Chinese freestyle wrestler (born 1974)

Li Zhengyu (Chinese: 李征宇; pinyin: Lǐ Zhēngyǔ; born October 10, 1974, in Guilin) is a Chinese freestyle wrestler who competed at the 2004 Summer Olympics.

He finished fifth in the 55 kg freestyle competition.
