= Babak Nourzad =

Iranian wrestler

Medal record

Representing Iran

Men's freestyle wrestling

World Championships
Silver medal – second place	2001 Sofia	54 kg

Babak Nourzad (Persian: بابک نورزاد, born 14 August 1978 in Ghaemshahr) is an Iranian former wrestler who competed in the 2004 Summer Olympics.
