= Atanas Nikolovski =

Macedonian slalom canoer (born 1980)

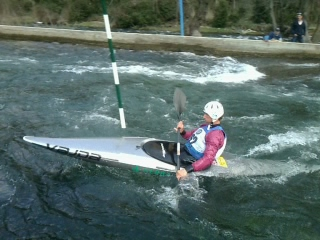

Atanas Nikolovski (born 22 June 1980 in Skopje) is a Macedonian slalom canoer who has competed since the mid-1990s.

In 2009, Atanas achieved 14th place in the world ranking race in Sydney, Australia. He came 1st in the semi-finals, and 7th in the finals of the 2010 ICF Canoe Slalom World Championships. At the 2008 Summer Olympics in Beijing, he was the flag-bearer for his nation during the opening ceremonies of those games. In the K-1 event, Nikolovski was eliminated in the qualifying round, finishing in 19th place.

Atanas is sponsored by Herbalife.
