= Metodi Nestorov =

Bulgarian footballer

International career
Years	Team	Apps	(Gls)
1957–1958	Bulgaria	5	(1)

Metodi Nestorov was a Bulgarian footballer. He played in five matches for the Bulgaria national football team from 1957 to 1958.
