= Mohammad Rezaei (wrestler, born 1978) =

Iranian wrestler

Medal record

Representing Iran

Men's freestyle wrestling

Asian Games
Bronze medal – third place	2002 Busan	55 kg

Asian Championships
Gold medal – first place	2006 Almaty	55 kg

Mohammad Rezaei (Persian: محمد رضايی, born March 21, 1978, in Nahavand) is an Iranian wrestler.
