= Saeed Azarbayjani =

Iranian-Canadian wrestler

Saeed Azarbayjani (Persian: سعید آذربایجانی; born January 17, 1975, in Iran) is an Iranian-Canadian male freestyle wrestler representing Canada. He participated in Men's freestyle 60 kg at 2008 Summer Olympics. In the 1/8 of final he beat Armenian Martin Berberyan, but lost in the quarterfinal to Morad Mohammadi from Iran.
