= Zelimkhan Huseynov =

Azerbaijani wrestler

Zelimkhan Huseynov Зелимхан Гусейнов
Personal information
- Full name: Zelimkhan Tezhdeivich Huseynov
- National team: Azerbaijan
- Born: July 13, 1981 (age 45) Khasavyurt, Dagestan ASSR, RSFSR, USSR
- Height: 174 cm (5 ft 9 in)
- Weight: 60 kg (132 lb)

Sport
- Country: Russia; Azerbaijan
- Sport: Wrestling
- Event: Freestyle
- Club: Shamil Umakhanov WC (им. Шамиля Умаханова)
Medal record
Men's Freestyle wrestling
Representing Azerbaijan
World Championships
Silver medal – second place	2009 Herning	60 kg
Bronze medal – third place	2010 Moscow	60 kg
World Cup
Gold medal – first place	2011 Makhachkala	60 kg
Gold medal – first place	2009 Tehran	60 kg
Bronze medal – third place	2010 Moscow	60 kg
European Championships
Gold medal – first place	2009 Vilnius	60 kg
Golden Grand Prix Ivan Yarygin
Bronze medal – third place	2009 Krasnoyarsk	60 kg
Representing Russia
Russian Championships
Gold medal – first place	1999 Krasnoyarsk	58 kg
Silver medal – second place	2000 St.Petersburg	58 kg
Junior World Championships
Bronze medal – third place	2001 Tashkent	60 kg

Zelimkhan Tezhdeivich Huseynov (Azerbaijani: Zəlimxan Hüseynov; Russian: Зелимхан Гусейнов; born July 13, 1981, in Dagestan) is a retired Russian and Azerbaijani freestyle wrestler of Chechen heritage who represented Azerbaijan in the Men's freestyle 60 kg at the 2008 Summer Olympics. In the 1/16 final he was beaten by Mavlet Batirov of Russia. After over two wins in the repechage rounds, he lost the bronze medal wrestling match to Iranian Morad Mohammadi.
