= Bazar Bazarguruev =

Kyrgyzstani wrestler (born 1985)

Personal information
- Native name: Базар Будажапович Базаргуруев
- Full name: Bazar Budazhapovich Bazarguruyev
- Nationality: Russia
- Born: January 9, 1985 (age 41) Chelutay, Agin-Buryat Okrug, Chita Oblast, RSFSR, Soviet Union
- Height: 162 cm (5 ft 4 in)

Sport
- Country: Russia Kyrgyzstan
- Sport: Wrestling
- Weight class: 60 kg
- Event: Freestyle
- Coached by: Anarbek Usenkanov Ruslan Madshinov

Achievements and titles
- Olympic finals: (bronze) (2008)
- World finals: (bronze) (2007)
- Regional finals: (gold) (2007) (bronze) (2009)
Medal record
Men's freestyle wrestling
Representing Kyrgyzstan
Olympic Games
Bronze medal – third place	2008 Beijing	60 kg
World Championships
Bronze medal – third place	2007 Baku	60 kg
Asian Championships
Gold medal – first place	2007 Bishkek	60 kg
Bronze medal – third place	2009 Pattaya	60 kg

Bazar Budazhapovich Bazarguruyev (Russian: Базар Будажапович Базаргуруев; born January 9, 1985) is a male freestyle wrestler of Buryat descent from Kyrgyzstan. He participated in Men's freestyle 60 kg at 2008 Summer Olympics. In this competition he was ranked on 4-5 place. He lost the bronze medal fight with Kenichi Yumoto from Japan. He would later be upgraded to a bronze medal after a doping violation of a Ukrainian athlete.

He is a bronze medalist of 2007 FILA Wrestling World Championships.
