= Sašo Nestorov =

Macedonian rifle shooter (born 1987)

Personal information
- Nationality: North Macedonia
- Born: 23 June 1987 (age 39) Kavadarci, Macedonia
- Height: 1.73 m (5 ft 8 in)
- Weight: 85 kg (187 lb)

Sport
- Sport: Shooting
- Event: 10 m air rifle

Sašo Nestorov (Macedonian: Сашо Несторов; born June 23, 1987, in Kavadarci) is a Macedonian rifle shooter. Nestorov represented Macedonia at the 2008 Summer Olympics in Beijing, where he competed in the men's 10 metre air rifle shooting. He finished only in last place out of fifty-one shooters for the qualifying rounds, with a total score of 558 points.
