= Malkhaz Zarkua =

Georgian freestyle wrestler (born 1986)

Malkhaz Zarkua (Georgian: მალხაზ ზარქუა; born 19 February 1986 in Zugdidi) is a Georgian freestyle wrestler. He competed in the freestyle 60 kg event at the 2012 Summer Olympics; after defeating Vasyl Fedoryshyn in the 1/8 finals, he was eliminated by Coleman Scott in the quarterfinals.
