= Hiroyuki Oda =

Japanese freestyle wrestler (born 1988)

Hiroyuki Oda (小田 裕之, Oda Hiroyuki; born 8 June 1988 in Mie Prefecture) is a Japanese wrestler. He won a silver medal in the 60 kg freestyle wrestling class at the 2010 Asian Games.
