= Besik Kudukhov =

Russian freestyle wrestler

Personal information
- Native name: Бесик Кудухов
- Full name: Besik Serodinovich Kudukhov
- Nationality: (Russia) Russian
- Born: Бесик Серодинович Кудухов; 15 August 1986 Tskhilon, Georgian SSR, Soviet Union
- Died: 29 December 2013 (aged 27) Krasnodar Krai, Russia
- Height: 164 cm (5 ft 5 in)

Sport
- Country: (Russia) Russian
- Sport: Wrestling
- Weight class: 55-60 kg
- Event: Freestyle
- Club: SC Alany; CSKA Moscow
- Coached by: Valentin Gozoev; Aleksey Safronov

Achievements and titles
- Olympic finals: (silver) (2012) (bronze) (2008)
- World finals: (gold) (2007) (gold) (2009) (gold) (2010) (gold) (2011) (silver) (2006)
- Regional finals: (gold) (2007)
Medal record
Representing Russia
Men's freestyle wrestling
Olympic Games
Silver medal – second place	2012 London	60 kg
Bronze medal – third place	2008 Beijing	55 kg
World Championships
Gold medal – first place	2007 Baku	55 kg
Gold medal – first place	2009 Herning	60 kg
Gold medal – first place	2010 Moscow	60 kg
Gold medal – first place	2011 Istanbul	60 kg
Silver medal – second place	2006 Guangzhou	55 kg
World Cup
Gold medal – first place	2011 Makhachkala	60 kg
Gold medal – first place	2010 Moscow	60 kg
Silver medal – second place	2006 Sari	55 kg
Bronze medal – third place	2009 Tehran	60 kg
European Championships
Gold medal – first place	2007 Sofia	55 kg
World Juniors Championships
Gold medal – first place	2005 Vilnius	55 kg
European Cadets Championships
Gold medal – first place	2003 Skopje	50 kg
Representing (North Ossetia–Alania) North Ossetia
Russian National Championships
Gold medal – first place	2012 St.Petersburg	60 kg
Gold medal – first place	2011 Yakutsk	60 kg
Gold medal – first place	2010 Volgograd	60 kg
Gold medal – first place	2009 Kazan	60 kg
Gold medal – first place	2006 Nishnevartovsk	55 kg
Bronze medal – third place	2013 Krasnoyarsk	60 kg
Grand Prix Ivan Yarygin
Gold medal – first place	2008 Krasnoyarsk	55 kg
Gold medal – first place	2007 Krasnoyarsk	55 kg

Besik Serodinovich Kudukhov (Russian: Бесик Серoдинович Кудухов, Iron Ossetic: Къудухты Серодины фырт Бесик; 15 August 1986 – 29 December 2013) was a Russian freestyle wrestler. He won a bronze medal in the 55 kg category at the 2008 Olympics. He also won a silver medal in the 60 kg category at the 2012 Summer Olympics in London.

== Career ==
Kudukhov took up wrestling in 1995 and was selected for the Russian national team in 2005. He was an Olympic finalist in 2012 and was considered one of the most dominant wrestlers in modern wrestling history. He was a world champion four times across two weight classes winning every world championship he competed in from 2007 to 2011. He was a finalist in the 2006 World Championships in Guangzhou, China at the age of 20. He was also a European Champion in 2007.

== Death ==
Kudukhov died on 29 December 2013 in a car crash on a federal highway in southern Russia between Krasnodar Krai and Vladikavkaz after he lost control of his car and collided with an oncoming truck.

== Doping ==
On 29 August 2016, a report indicated that a retested sample for Kudukhov taken at the time of the 2012 Olympic 60 kg freestyle wrestling event had returned a positive result (later disclosed as dehydrochlormethyltestosterone).

On 27 October 2016, the IOC stated that the fact that Kudukhov had died was not known at the time the decision to include his samples in the re-analysis process was made.

Consequently, the IOC dropped all disciplinary proceedings: such proceedings cannot be conducted against a deceased person, meaning Olympic results that would have been reviewed will remain uncorrected as the proceedings cannot move forward. In any event, bronze medalist Yogeshwar Dutt had earlier refused to accept the silver medal, expressing his wish for Kudukhov's family to retain it.
