= Ri Jong-myong =

North Korean freestyle wrestler (born 1985)

Personal information
- Nationality: North Korean
- Born: April 27, 1985 (age 41)
- Height: 1.64 m (5 ft 5 in)
- Weight: 60 kg (132 lb)

Korean name
- Hangul: 리종명
- RR: Ri Jongmyeong
- MR: Ri Chongmyŏng

Sport
- Country: North Korea
- Sport: Freestyle wrestling
Medal record
Men's freestyle wrestling
Representing North Korea
Asian Championships
Bronze medal – third place	2011 Uzbekistan	55 kg
- Updated on 11 August 2012

Ri Jong-myong (born April 27, 1985) is a North Korean wrestler.

He represented North Korea at the 2010 Asian Games, but was defeated by Dauren Zhumagaziyev. He went on to represent North Korea at the 2012 Summer Olympics in the Men's freestyle 60 kg and stood 5th after losing to Yogeshwar Dutt of India 1–3.
