= Qin He =

Chinese wrestler

Qin He (born December 14, 1984, in Guangxi) is a male Chinese freestyle wrestler who competed in the 2008 Summer Olympics.

He personal best was coming 5th at the 2007 World Championships - 60 kg freestyle and came in 2nd in the 2009 National Games - freestyle men's\60 kg.
