= Anatolie Guidea =

Bulgarian freestyle wrestler

Personal information
- Full name: Anatolie Ilarionovich Guidea
- Nationality: Bulgarian; Moldovan
- Born: 21 January 1977 (age 49) Nisporeni, Moldova
- Height: 165 cm (5 ft 5 in)
- Weight: 60 kg (132 lb)

Sport
- Country: Bulgaria
- Sport: Wrestling
- Club: SV Germania Weingarten, Weingarten, Germany
- Coached by: Michail Dukov (from 2006)
Medal record
Men's freestyle wrestling
Representing Bulgaria
World Championships
Silver medal – second place	2007 Baku	60kg
European Championships
Gold medal – first place	2003 Riga	60kg
Silver medal – second place	2012 Belgrade	60kg
Silver medal – second place	2007 London	60kg
Bronze medal – third place	2011 Dortmund	60kg
Bronze medal – third place	2008 Tampere	60kg
Bronze medal – third place	2006 Moscow	60kg
- Updated on 11 August 2012

Anatolie Ilarionovich Guidea (Bulgarian: Анатоли Иларионович Гуйдя, born 21 January 1977) is a Moldovan-born Bulgarian wrestler. Since 2000 he represents Bulgaria in international competitions.

He represented Bulgaria at the 2012 Summer Olympics in the Men's freestyle 60 kg and ranked 13th.
