= Murad Ramazanov (wrestler) =

Personal information
- Born: 19 March 1974 (age 52) Khasavyurt, Dagestan
Medal record
Men's freestyle wrestling
Representing North Macedonia
European Wrestling Championships
| Bronze medal – third place | 2005 Varna | 60 kg |
Representing Russia
European Wrestling Championships
| Gold medal – first place | 2000 Moscow | 58 kg |
Russian National Championships
| Gold medal – first place | 2000 Saint Petersburg | 58 kg |

Murad Ramazanov (born March 19, 1974, in Khasavyurt, Dagestan) is a male freestyle wrestler who represented Russia and Republic of Macedonia. He participated in a men's freestyle 58 kg at the 2000 Summer Olympics, and men's freestyle 60 kg at the 2008 Summer Olympics.
