= Hassan Madani =

Egyptian freestyle wrestler

Hassan Madani (born March 6, 1979, in Cairo) is a male freestyle wrestler from Egypt.

== Career ==
Madani participated in the Men's freestyle 60 kg event at the 2008 Summer Olympics. He was eliminated in the 1/8 final, losing to Morad Mohammadi from Iran.

At the 2012 Summer Olympics he reached the quarter-final, where he was beaten by Ri Jong-Myong of North Korea.
