= Didier Païs =

French freestyle wrestler

Didier Païs (born 8 February 1983 in Colmar) is a French freestyle wrestler. He competed in the freestyle 60 kg event at the 2012 Summer Olympics and was eliminated in the 1/8 finals by Hassan Madani.
