= Vitaly Koryakin =

Tajikistani freestyle wrestler

Vitaly Koryakin (born 2 December 1983) is a male freestyle wrestler from Tajikistan. He participated in Men's freestyle 60 kg at 2008 Summer Olympics. He was eliminated in 1/8 final by Kenichi Yumoto from Japan. At the last competition in which he participated, the world championship in 2007, he won 17th place.
