= Dilshod Mansurov =

Uzbekistani freestyle wrestler (born 1983)

Medal record

Representing Uzbekistan

Men's Freestyle wrestling

World Championships
Gold medal – first place	2003 New York	55 kg
Gold medal – first place	2005 Budapest	55 kg
Bronze medal – third place	2009 Herning	60 kg

Asian Games
Gold medal – first place	2002 Busan	55 kg
Gold medal – first place	2006 Doha	55 kg
Gold medal – first place	2010 Guangzhou	55 kg

Asian Championships
Gold medal – first place	2005 Wuhan	55 kg

Dilshod Mansurov (born December 12, 1983, in Tashkent) is a male freestyle wrestler from Uzbekistan. He participated in Men's freestyle 55 kg at 2008 Summer Olympics. He earned 4th place after losing the bronze medal fight with Besik Kudukhov.

Mansurov also participated in 2004 Summer Olympics where he was ranked 10th and the 2012 Summer Olympics where he was 14th.

He is a winner of 2003 and 2005 FILA Wrestling World Championships (Men's freestyle 55 kg).

Mansurov won gold medals at 2002 Asian Games and 2006 Asian Games and 2010 Asian Games.
