= Morad Mohammadi =

Iranian wrestler (born 1980)

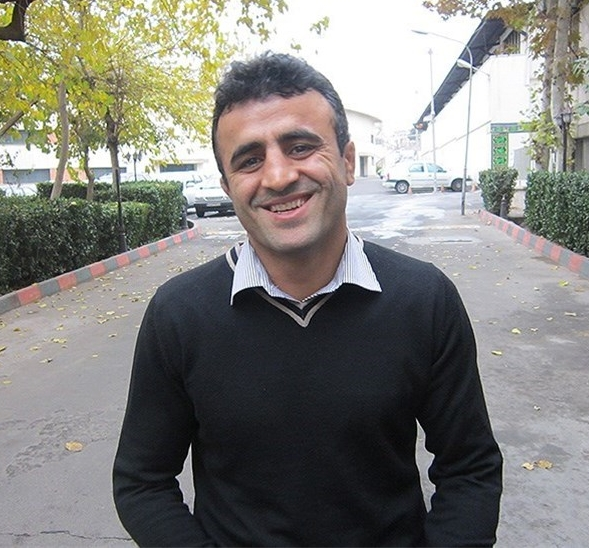

Personal information
- Nationality: Iranian
- Born: April 9, 1980 (age 46) Sari, Iran

Sport
- Country: Iran
- Sport: Wrestling
Medal record
Men's freestyle wrestling
Representing Iran
Olympic Games
Bronze medal – third place	2008 Beijing	60 kg
World Championships
Gold medal – first place	2006 Guangzhou	60 kg
Bronze medal – third place	2005 Budapest	60 kg
Bronze medal – third place	2010 Moscow	60 kg
Asian Games
Gold medal – first place	2006 Doha	60 kg
Asian Championships
Gold medal – first place	2003 New Delhi	60 kg
Gold medal – first place	2005 Wuhan	60 kg
Silver medal – second place	2004 Tehran	60 kg
Silver medal – second place	2006 Almaty	60 kg
Bronze medal – third place	2008 Jeju City	60 kg

Seyed Morad Mohammadi Pahnehkolaei (Persian: سید مراد محمدی پهنه کلایی; born April 9, 1980, in Sari, Mazandaran) is an Iranian wrestler and an Olympic bronze medalist who competed in the 2006 Asian Games in the 60 kg division and won the gold medal.

Awards
Preceded by Hossein Rezazadeh	Iran Sportsperson of the year 2006; Shared with Ehsan Haddadi	Succeeded by Hamid Sourian
