= Vasyl Fedoryshyn =

Ukrainian wrestler (born 1981)

Medal record

Men's freestyle wrestling

Representing Ukraine

Olympic Games
Disqualified	2008 Beijing	60kg

World Championships
Silver medal – second place	2010 Moscow	60kg
Bronze medal – third place	2009 Herning	60kg

FILA European Wrestling Championships
Gold medal – first place	2005 Varna	60 kg
Gold medal – first place	2007 Sofia	60 kg
Gold medal – first place	2008 Tampere	60 kg
Silver medal – second place	2001 Budapest	58 kg
Silver medal – second place	2002 Baku	60 kg
Bronze medal – third place	2004 Ankara	60 kg
Bronze medal – third place	2009 Vilnius	60 kg
Bronze medal – third place	2010 Baku	60 kg
Bronze medal – third place	2011 Dortmund	60 kg

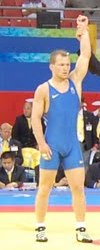
Vasyl Fedoryshyn

Vasyl Petrovych Fedoryshyn (Ukrainian: Васи́ль Петро́вич Федори́шин; born 31 March 1981) is a male wrestler from Ukraine, who competes in the men's -60 kg freestyle division.

== Career ==
Fedoryshyn was born in Kalush, Ukrainian SSR. He competed in wrestling at the 2009 Maccabiah Games. Fedoryshyn finished fourth in the Men's Lightweight Freestyle event at the 2004 Summer Olympics in Athens, won a silver medal in the same event at the 2008 Summer Olympics in Beijing, and was eliminated in the first round of the 2012 Olympic tournament by Malkhaz Zarkua of Georgia. He won a bronze medal in the 60 kg event at the 2009 FILA Wrestling World Championships. and a silver medal in the same discipline at the 2010 edition, losing to Besik Kudukhov of Russia in the final. On 5 April 2017, it was announced that, as a result of retesting samples, he had been disqualified from the 2008 Olympics for a drug violation, and his silver medal withdrawn.

== See also ==
- List of select Jewish wrestlers
