= Mavlet Batirov =

Russian freestyle wrestler

Mavlet Batirov Мавлет Батиров
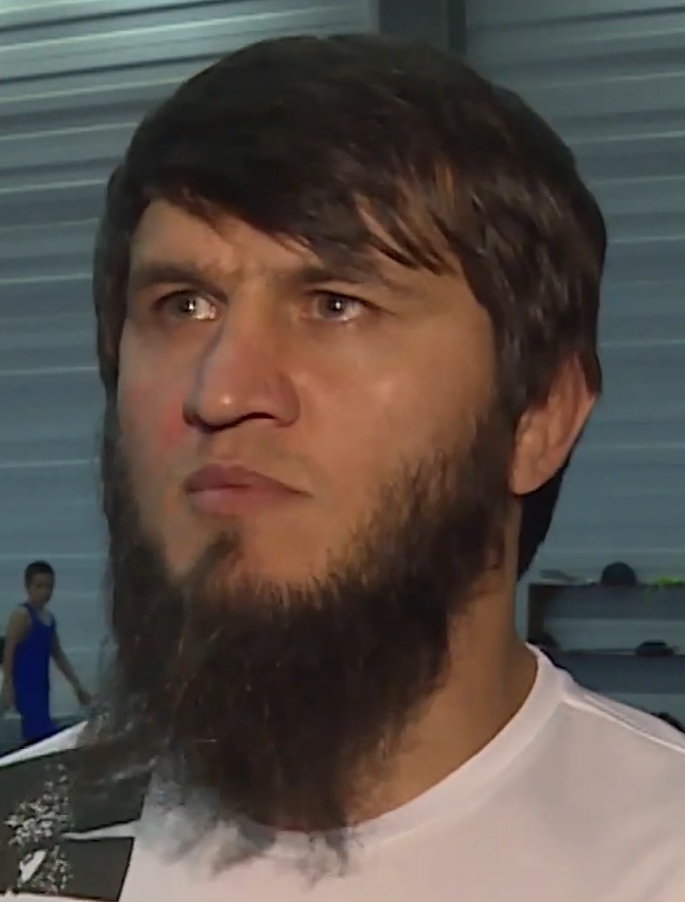
- Batirov in 2020

Personal information
- Full name: Mavlet Alavdinovich Batirov
- Nationality: Russian
- Born: December 12, 1983 (age 42) Khasavyurt, Russian SFSR, Soviet Union
- Height: 1.56 m (5 ft 1 in)
- Weight: 60 kg (132 lb); 55 kg (121 lb)

Sport
- Country: Russia
- Sport: Wrestling
- Event: Freestyle
- Club: Shamil Umakhanov Wrestling Club (им. Шамиля Умаханова)
- Coached by: Magomed Azizov, Dzhambolat Tedeyev and Saigidpasha Umakhanov
Medal record
Men's freestyle wrestling
Representing Russia
Olympic Games
Gold medal – first place	2004 Athens	55 kg
Gold medal – first place	2008 Beijing	60 kg
World Championships
Bronze medal – third place	2006 Guangzhou	60 kg
Gold medal – first place	2007 Baku	60 kg
European Championships
Bronze medal – third place	2003 Riga	60 kg
Gold medal – first place	2007 Moscow	60 kg

Mavlet Alavdinovich Batirov (Russian: Мавлет Алавдинович Батиров, born December 12, 1983) is a Russian freestyle wrestler, world and two-time Olympic champion, who competed in the men's freestyle 55 kg category at the 2004 Summer Olympics and won the gold medal.

In April 2006, he became the 60 kg European champion in Moscow, .

In September 2007 in Baku, he won the World Championship at 60 kg.

In August 2008, in Beijing, Batirov won his second Olympic gold medal competing in the 60 kg weight class.

Mavlet Batirov's younger brother Adam Batirov is also a freestyle wrestler (European Champion) who is currently representing Bahrain.

== See also ==
- List of Russian sportspeople
