= Kenichi Yumoto =

Japanese freestyle wrestler

Personal information
- Native name: 湯元健一
- Nationality: Japan
- Born: 4 December 1984 (age 41) Wakayama, Wakayama, Japan
- Height: 166 cm (5 ft 5 in)

Sport
- Country: Japan
- Sport: Wrestling
- Weight class: 60 kg
- Event: Freestyle
- Club: Alsok Sports Club, Tokyo
- Coached by: Masanori Ohashi

Achievements and titles
- Olympic finals: (silver) (2008) 5th (2012)
- World finals: (bronze) (2011)
Medal record
Men's freestyle wrestling
Representing Japan
Olympic Games
Bronze medal – third place	2008 Beijing	60 kg
World Championships
Bronze medal – third place	2011 Istanbul	60 kg
World Cup
Silver medal – second place	2012 Baku	60 kg
Asian Juniors Championships
Bronze medal – third place	2004 Almata	60 kg

Kenichi Yumoto (Japanese: 湯元健一; born 4 December 1984 in Wakayama, Wakayama Prefecture, Japan) is a Japanese freestyle wrestler. At the 2008 Summer Olympics in Beijing, he won the bronze medal in his category (60 kilograms). His twin brother Shinichi is also an Olympic-medal winning wrestler.
