= Yogeshwar Dutt =

Indian wrestler (born 1982)

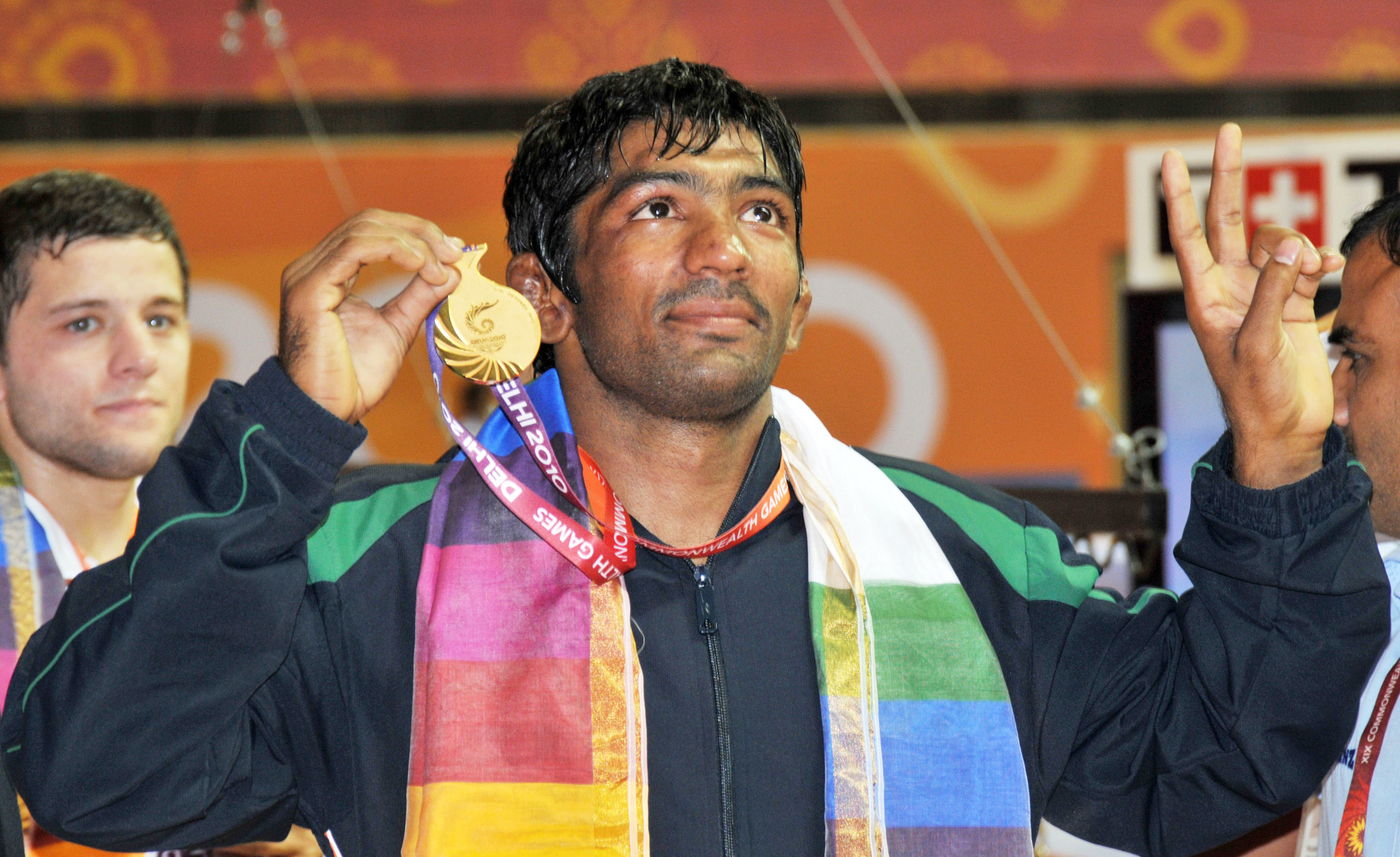
- Dutt at the 2010 Commonwealth Games

Personal information
- Nicknames: Yogi, Pahalwan Ji
- Born: 2 November 1982 (age 43) Bhainswal Kalan, Sonipat, Haryana, India
- Height: 1.68 m (5 ft 6 in)
Medal record
Representing India
Men's freestyle wrestling
Olympic Games
| Bronze medal – third place | 2012 London | 60kg |
Asian Games
| Gold medal – first place | 2014 Incheon | 65kg |
| Bronze medal – third place | 2006 Doha | 60kg |
Asian Championships
| Gold medal – first place | 2008 Jeju | 60kg |
| Gold medal – first place | 2012 Gumi | 60kg |
Commonwealth Games
| Gold medal – first place | 2010 Delhi | 60kg |
| Gold medal – first place | 2014 Glasgow | 65kg |
Commonwealth Championships
| Gold medal – first place | 2003 London | 55kg |
| Gold medal – first place | 2005 Stellenbosch | 60kg |
| Gold medal – first place | 2007 London | 60kg |
Men's greco-roman wrestling
Commonwealth Championships
| Silver medal – second place | 2005 Stellenbosch | 60kg |
| Silver medal – second place | 2007 London | 60kg |

Yogeshwar Dutt (born 2 November 1982) is a former Indian wrestler. At the 2012 London Olympics, he won a bronze medal in the 60 kg freestyle event. He was conferred the Arjuna Award in 2009, Khel Ratna in 2012 and the Padma Shri in 2013 by the Government of India.

== Personal life ==
Dutt was born in Bhainswal Kalan village in Sonipat district of Haryana. He first started wrestling at the age of eight in his native village and idolised Balraj Pehlwan. He was trained by coach Ramphal. Dutt is a vegetarian.

== Career ==
=== 2006 Asian Games ===
Yogeshwar had lost his father on 3 August 2006 just nine days before he boarded the flight to Doha for the Asian Games. He also sustained a knee injury, but despite all the emotional and physical trauma he managed to win the bronze in the 60 kg category at the 15th Asian Games at Doha.

=== 2010 Commonwealth Games ===
At the 2010 Delhi Commonwealth Games, Yogeshwar overcame a career-threatening knee injury to win the 60 kg title. On his way to the final, Yogeshwar went past Australian Farzad Tarash (16–0, 17–0), South African Marius Loots (7–1) and England's Sasha Madyarchyk (4–4, 8–0) before winning the gold.

=== 2012 Summer Olympics ===
On 12 August 2012, Dutt provided a late boost to India's medals tally in the 2012 London Olympics by claiming a bronze in the Men's freestyle 60 kg, becoming only the third Indian wrestler to win an Olympic medal after K D Jadhav in 1952 and Sushil Kumar in 2008 and 2012.

He had defeated North Korean Ri Jong-Myong in the bronze medal bout thus winning the fifth medal for Indian contingent at the London Olympics 2012.

Earlier, Yogeshwar qualified for the 2012 Olympics by winning a silver medal at an Asian qualification tournament in Astana, Kazakhstan where he lost to Iranian Masoud Esmaeilpour (2–3, 0–1) in the final.

At the Olympics he lost to the Russian B Kudukhov 1–0, 2–0 and was knocked out in the pre-quarterfinal round. He got a chance to contest in the repechage rounds as Kudukhov reached the finals of the event.

In his first repechage round he went on to beat Franklin Gómez of Puerto Rico with a score of 1–0, 1–0. He got lucky against his opponent, winning the toss on both the occasions to earn a clinch position. Yogeshwar then scored 7–5 to beat Masoud Esmaeilpour with an aggregate of counted points 3–1 in Repechage Round 2. Esmaeilpour had beaten Yogeshwar at the Asian qualifications earlier that year.

He finally beat his North Korean opponent to clinch the bronze medal (0–1, 1–0, 6–0). He was exceptional in the last round, and clinched it in just 1:02 minutes.

=== 2014 Commonwealth Games ===
Yogeshwar Dutt won the gold medal in the men's 65 kg freestyle category by beating Canada's Jevon Balfour 10–0 in the finals.

Yogeshwar had earlier beaten Alex Gladkov of Scotland 4–0 in the pre-quarters and then easily defeated another Scottish wrestler Gareth Jones in the quarterfinals by employing his trademark Fitele (leg twisting) technique that he had used while winning the bronze medal at the 2012 London Olympics. In the semi-finals, Yogeshwar successfully used his favourite technique again to get the better of Sri Lanka's Chamara Perera in just two minutes and three seconds. Yogeshwar won with a 0–5 verdict after taking a 10–0 lead on technical points.

=== 2014 Asian Games ===
Yogeshwar Dutt won the Gold in the 65 kg freestyle wrestling category by defeating Zalimkhan Yusupov of Tajikistan in the final at the Asian games 2014. Dutt won a closely fought final 1–0. Earlier, he defeated the opponent from China in the semi-final by Fall in another closely fought bout in which Dutt was trailing almost until the end. He defeated Jinhyok Kang of North Korea in the quarterfinal.

=== 2015 ===
In 2015, he was clubbed into the 'Icon' category by Haryana Hammers – one of the six teams playing under the first edition of Pro Wrestling League (PWL), which was held from 10 to 27 December in six Indian cities.

== Political career ==
Dutt joined the Bharatiya Janata Party in September 2019.

== Awards, rewards and recognition ==
- Major Dhyan Chand Khel Ratna Award 2012 given by Government of India

For the bronze medal at 2012 London Olympic

- ₹10 million (US$100,000) cash reward from the Haryana Government.
- 4x4 vehicle from a PSU bank

== See also ==
- India at the 2012 Summer Olympics
