= 1999 World Wrestling Championships – Men's freestyle 54 kg =

Men's freestyle 54 kg at the 1999 World Championships
- Venue: Atatürk Sport Hall
- Dates: 7–9 October 1999
- Competitors: 35 from 35 nations

Medalists
gold medal	Kim Woo-yong	South Korea
silver medal	Adkhamjon Achilov	Uzbekistan
bronze medal	Oleksandr Zakharuk	Ukraine

The men's freestyle 54 kilograms is a competition featured at the 1999 World Wrestling Championships, and was held at the Atatürk Sport Hall in Ankara, Turkey from 7 to 9 October 1999.

== Results ==
=== Preliminary round ===
==== Pool 1 ====
Pos	Athlete	Pld	W	L	CP	TP	CAN	SUI	MKD
1	Paul Ragusa (CAN)	2	2	0	6	11	—	6–1	5–0
2	Thomas Röthlisberger (SUI)	2	1	1	4	7	1–3 PP	—	6–1
3	Vlatko Sokolov (MKD)	2	0	2	1	1	0–3 PO	1–3 PP	—

Source: Official website

==== Pool 2 ====
Pos	Athlete	Pld	W	L	CP	TP	UZB	IND	EST
1	Adkhamjon Achilov (UZB)	2	2	0	7	19	—	9–5	10–0
2	Kripa Shankar Patel (IND)	2	1	1	5	22	1–3 PP	—	17–7
3	Jaanek Lips (EST)	2	0	2	1	7	0–4 ST	1–4 SP	—

Source: Official website

==== Pool 3 ====
Pos	Athlete	Pld	W	L	CP	TP	CHN	SVK	VEN
1	Meng Haibo (CHN)	2	2	0	7	14	—	3–2	11–0
2	Roman Kollar (SVK)	2	1	1	5	14	1–3 PP	—	12–1
3	José Barreto (VEN)	2	0	2	1	1	0–4 ST	1–4 SP	—

Source: Official website

==== Pool 4 ====
Pos	Athlete	Pld	W	L	CP	TP	KAZ	KOR	AZE
1	Maulen Mamyrov (KAZ)	2	2	0	6	11	—	7–3	4–2
2	Kim Woo-yong (KOR)	2	1	1	5	16	1–3 PP	—	13–3 Fall
3	Namig Abdullayev (AZE)	2	0	2	1	5	1–3 PP	0–4 TO	—

Source: Official website

==== Pool 5 ====
Pos	Athlete	Pld	W	L	CP	TP	TUR	CUB	GEO
1	Mevlana Kulaç (TUR)	2	2	0	6	12	—	3–2	9–7
2	Wilfredo García (CUB)	2	1	1	4	11	1–3 PP	—	9–3
3	Giorgi Gagishvili (GEO)	2	0	2	2	10	1–3 PP	1–3 PP	—

Source: Official website

==== Pool 6 ====
Pos	Athlete	Pld	W	L	CP	TP	UKR	MGL	ARM
1	Oleksandr Zakharuk (UKR)	2	2	0	6	12	—	7–1	5–0
2	Tümendembereliin Züünbayan (MGL)	2	1	1	5	4	1–3 PP	—	3–0 Fall
3	Armen Mkrtchyan (ARM)	2	0	2	0	0	0–3 PO	0–4 TO	—

Source: Official website

==== Pool 7 ====
Pos	Athlete	Pld	W	L	CP	TP	GRE	GER	MDA
1	Amiran Kardanov (GRE)	2	2	0	6	7	—	4–2	3–1
2	Vasilij Zeiher (GER)	2	1	1	5	14	1–3 PP	—	12–3 Fall
3	Vitalie Railean (MDA)	2	0	2	1	4	1–3 PP	0–4 TO	—

Source: Official website

==== Pool 8 ====
Pos	Athlete	Pld	W	L	CP	TP	IRI	KGZ	AUT
1	Gholamreza Mohammadi (IRI)	2	2	0	7	31	—	1–0	30–0 Fall
2	Nurdin Donbaev (KGZ)	2	1	1	4	11	0–3 PO	—	11–0
3	Helmut Mühlbacher (AUT)	2	0	2	0	0	0–4 TO	0–4 ST	—

Source: Official website

==== Pool 9 ====
Pos	Athlete	Pld	W	L	CP	TP	PRK	HUN	ROM
1	Han Yong-do (PRK)	2	2	0	8	23	—	12–2	11–0
2	Zsolt Szatmári (HUN)	2	1	1	4	7	1–4 SP	—	5–1
3	Viorel Mandagiu (ROM)	2	0	2	1	1	0–4 ST	1–3 PP	—

Source: Official website

==== Pool 10 ====
Pos	Athlete	Pld	W	L	CP	TP	RUS	JPN	FRA	POL
1	Leonid Chuchunov (RUS)	3	3	0	10	20	—	5–2	10–0	5–0
2	Chikara Tanabe (JPN)	3	2	1	8	22	1–3 PP	—	11–0	9–4
3	David Legrand (FRA)	3	1	2	3	4	0–4 ST	0–4 ST	—	4–3
4	Stanisław Surdyka (POL)	3	0	3	2	7	0–3 PO	1–3 PP	1–3 PP	—

Source: Official website

==== Pool 11 ====
Pos	Athlete	Pld	W	L	CP	TP	USA	BUL	BLR	CZE
1	Eric Akin (USA)	3	3	0	9	13	—	3–2	3–2	7–0
2	Ivan Tsonov (BUL)	3	2	1	8	8	1–3 PP	—	6–5	WO
3	Herman Kantoyeu (BLR)	3	1	2	6	14	1–3 PP	1–3 PP	—	7–5 Ret
4	Luděk Burian (CZE)	3	0	3	0	5	0–3 PO	0–4 EF	0–4 PA	—

Source: Official website

=== Knockout round ===
Round of 16
Paul Ragusa (CAN)	3
Adkhamjon Achilov (UZB)	10
Meng Haibo (CHN)	0
Maulen Mamyrov (KAZ)	4
Mevlana Kulaç (TUR)	1
Oleksandr Zakharuk (UKR)	4
Amiran Kardanov (GRE)	4
Gholamreza Mohammadi (IRI)	6
Han Yong-do (PRK)	1
Leonid Chuchunov (RUS)	1
Eric Akin (USA)	0
Kim Woo-yong (KOR)	3
Tümendembereliin Züünbayan (MGL)	8
Vasilij Zeiher (GER)	4
Chikara Tanabe (JPN)	2
Ivan Tsonov (BUL)	4

Quarterfinals
Adkhamjon Achilov (UZB)	2
Maulen Mamyrov (KAZ)	2
Oleksandr Zakharuk (UKR)	3
Gholamreza Mohammadi (IRI)	0
Leonid Chuchunov (RUS)	2
Kim Woo-yong (KOR)	3
Tümendembereliin Züünbayan (MGL)	3
Ivan Tsonov (BUL)	5

Semifinals
Adkhamjon Achilov (UZB)	8
Oleksandr Zakharuk (UKR)	3
Kim Woo-yong (KOR)	4
Ivan Tsonov (BUL)	0

Final
Adkhamjon Achilov (UZB)	0
Kim Woo-yong (KOR)	4
Bronze medal match
Oleksandr Zakharuk (UKR)	10
Ivan Tsonov (BUL)	0
