= 1998 World Wrestling Championships – Men's freestyle 54 kg =

Men's freestyle 54 kg at the 1998 World Championships
- Venue: Azadi Indoor Stadium
- Dates: 8–10 September 1998
- Competitors: 24 from 24 nations

Medalists
gold medal	Sammie Henson	United States
silver medal	Namig Abdullayev	Azerbaijan
bronze medal	Gholamreza Mohammadi	Iran

The men's freestyle 54 kilograms is a competition featured at the 1998 World Wrestling Championships, and was held at the Azadi Indoor Stadium in Tehran, Iran from 8 to 10 September 1998.

== Results ==
Legend

- WO — Won by walkover

=== Round 1 ===
	Score	
Round of 32
Oleksandr Zakharuk (UKR)	10–0	James Crowe (CAN)
Maulen Mamyrov (KAZ)	5–0	Vitalie Railean (MDA)
Sammie Henson (USA)	6–4	Vasilij Zeiher (GER)
Niu Pinghui (CHN)	0–5	Amiran Kardanov (GRE)
Stanisław Surdyka (POL)	0–3	Kripa Shankar Patel (IND)
Ivan Tsonov (BUL)	5–4	Chikara Tanabe (JPN)
Chechenol Mongush (RUS)	4–1 Fall	Nurdin Donbaev (KGZ)
Mevlana Kulaç (TUR)	4–7	Herman Kantoyeu (BLR)
Armen Simonyan (ARM)	9–1	Wilfredo García (CUB)
Adkhamjon Achilov (UZB)	9–2	Thomas Röthlisberger (SUI)
Gholamreza Mohammadi (IRI)	2–1	Jung Soon-won (KOR)
Namig Abdullayev (AZE)	3–0	Tümendembereliin Züünbayan (MGL)

=== Round 2 ===
	Score	
Round of 16
Oleksandr Zakharuk (UKR)	0–4	Maulen Mamyrov (KAZ)
Sammie Henson (USA)	5–4	Amiran Kardanov (GRE)
Kripa Shankar Patel (IND)	5–4	Ivan Tsonov (BUL)
Chechenol Mongush (RUS)	2–0 Fall	Herman Kantoyeu (BLR)
Armen Simonyan (ARM)	10–0	Adkhamjon Achilov (UZB)
Gholamreza Mohammadi (IRI)	5–2 Fall	Namig Abdullayev (AZE)
Repechage
James Crowe (CAN)	4–11 Fall	Vitalie Railean (MDA)
Vasilij Zeiher (GER)	8–7 Fall	Niu Pinghui (CHN)
Stanisław Surdyka (POL)	4–8	Chikara Tanabe (JPN)
Nurdin Donbaev (KGZ)	4–1	Mevlana Kulaç (TUR)
Wilfredo García (CUB)	5–1	Thomas Röthlisberger (SUI)
Jung Soon-won (KOR)	10–0	Tümendembereliin Züünbayan (MGL)

=== Round 3 ===
	Score	
Quarterfinals
Maulen Mamyrov (KAZ)	1–3	Sammie Henson (USA)
Kripa Shankar Patel (IND)	2–5	Chechenol Mongush (RUS)
Armen Simonyan (ARM)		Bye
Namig Abdullayev (AZE)		Bye
Repechage
Vitalie Railean (MDA)	1–5	Vasilij Zeiher (GER)
Chikara Tanabe (JPN)	1–6	Nurdin Donbaev (KGZ)
Wilfredo García (CUB)	2–3	Jung Soon-won (KOR)
Oleksandr Zakharuk (UKR)	0–4	Amiran Kardanov (GRE)
Ivan Tsonov (BUL)	0–9	Herman Kantoyeu (BLR)
Adkhamjon Achilov (UZB)	0–11	Gholamreza Mohammadi (IRI)

=== Round 4 ===
	Score	
Semifinals
Sammie Henson (USA)	4–3	Chechenol Mongush (RUS)
Armen Simonyan (ARM)	1–3	Namig Abdullayev (AZE)
Repechage
Vasilij Zeiher (GER)	2–2	Nurdin Donbaev (KGZ)
Jung Soon-won (KOR)	3–8	Amiran Kardanov (GRE)
Herman Kantoyeu (BLR)	0–6	Gholamreza Mohammadi (IRI)
Maulen Mamyrov (KAZ)	WO	Kripa Shankar Patel (IND)

=== Round 5 ===
	Score	
Repechage
Vasilij Zeiher (GER)	3–11	Amiran Kardanov (GRE)
Gholamreza Mohammadi (IRI)	6–0	Kripa Shankar Patel (IND)

=== Round 6 ===
	Score	
Repechage
Chechenol Mongush (RUS)	4–5	Amiran Kardanov (GRE)
Gholamreza Mohammadi (IRI)	4–0	Armen Simonyan (ARM)

=== Finals ===
	Score	
Bronze medal match
Amiran Kardanov (GRE)	1–3	Gholamreza Mohammadi (IRI)
Final
Sammie Henson (USA)	3–1	Namig Abdullayev (AZE)
