= 1997 World Wrestling Championships – Men's freestyle 54 kg =

Men's freestyle 54 kg at the 1997 World Championships
- Venue: Yenisey Sports Palace
- Dates: 28–30 August 1997
- Competitors: 30 from 30 nations

Medalists
gold medal	Wilfredo García	Cuba
silver medal	Jin Ju-dong	North Korea
bronze medal	Maulen Mamyrov	Kazakhstan

The men's freestyle 54 kilograms is a competition featured at the 1997 World Wrestling Championships, and was held at the Yenisey Sports Palace in Krasnoyarsk, Russia from 28 to 30 August 1997.

== Results ==
Legend

- WO — Won by walkover

=== Round 1 ===
	Score	
Round of 32
Maulen Mamyrov (KAZ)	7–0	Li Zhengyu (CHN)
Oleksandr Zakharuk (UKR)	7–2	David Legrand (FRA)
Gheorghe Corduneanu (ROM)	0–10	Gholamreza Mohammadi (IRI)
Mevlana Kulaç (TUR)	3–2	Nazim Alidjanov (MDA)
Roger Ruiu (CAN)	6–5	José Restrepo (COL)
Zeke Jones (USA)	3–5	Jin Ju-dong (PRK)
Tamazi Kuloshvili (GEO)	0–6	Herman Kantoyeu (BLR)
Nurdin Donbaev (KGZ)	7–4	Ivan Tsonov (BUL)
Wilfredo García (CUB)	9–0	José Barreto (VEN)
Thomas Röthlisberger (SUI)	5–11	Romica Rașovan (GER)
Vlatko Sokolov (MKD)	4–1	Pavel Siniavski (ISR)
Namig Abdullayev (AZE)	10–0	Armen Simonyan (ARM)
Maksim Molonov (RUS)	8–1	Song Jae-myung (KOR)
Károly Kiss (HUN)	0–11	Adkhamjon Achilov (UZB)
Tümendembereliin Züünbayan (MGL)	7–6	Hideo Sasayama (JPN)

=== Round 2 ===
	Score	
Round of 16
Maulen Mamyrov (KAZ)	3–0	Oleksandr Zakharuk (UKR)
Gholamreza Mohammadi (IRI)	5–3	Mevlana Kulaç (TUR)
Roger Ruiu (CAN)	0–12	Jin Ju-dong (PRK)
Herman Kantoyeu (BLR)	6–3	Nurdin Donbaev (KGZ)
Wilfredo García (CUB)	5–1	Romica Rașovan (GER)
Vlatko Sokolov (MKD)	0–11	Namig Abdullayev (AZE)
Maksim Molonov (RUS)	11–5	Adkhamjon Achilov (UZB)
Tümendembereliin Züünbayan (MGL)		Bye
Repechage
Li Zhengyu (CHN)	12–7	David Legrand (FRA)
Gheorghe Corduneanu (ROM)	1–7	Nazim Alidjanov (MDA)
José Restrepo (COL)	0–8 Fall	Zeke Jones (USA)
Tamazi Kuloshvili (GEO)	1–7	Ivan Tsonov (BUL)
José Barreto (VEN)	13–8	Thomas Röthlisberger (SUI)
Pavel Siniavski (ISR)	0–10	Armen Simonyan (ARM)
Song Jae-myung (KOR)	6–2	Károly Kiss (HUN)
Hideo Sasayama (JPN)		Bye

=== Round 3 ===
	Score	
Quarterfinals
Tümendembereliin Züünbayan (MGL)	1–12	Maulen Mamyrov (KAZ)
Gholamreza Mohammadi (IRI)	1–5	Jin Ju-dong (PRK)
Herman Kantoyeu (BLR)	0–3	Wilfredo García (CUB)
Namig Abdullayev (AZE)	1–3	Maksim Molonov (RUS)
Repechage
Hideo Sasayama (JPN)	5–0 Fall	Li Zhengyu (CHN)
Nazim Alidjanov (MDA)	2–8	Zeke Jones (USA)
Ivan Tsonov (BUL)	10–0 Fall	José Barreto (VEN)
Armen Simonyan (ARM)	3–5	Song Jae-myung (KOR)
Oleksandr Zakharuk (UKR)	3–2	Mevlana Kulaç (TUR)
Roger Ruiu (CAN)	2–7	Nurdin Donbaev (KGZ)
Romica Rașovan (GER)	6–0	Vlatko Sokolov (MKD)
Adkhamjon Achilov (UZB)		Bye

=== Round 4 ===
	Score	
Repechage
Adkhamjon Achilov (UZB)	6–4	Hideo Sasayama (JPN)
Zeke Jones (USA)	4–6	Ivan Tsonov (BUL)
Song Jae-myung (KOR)	0–3	Oleksandr Zakharuk (UKR)
Nurdin Donbaev (KGZ)	6–0	Romica Rașovan (GER)
Tümendembereliin Züünbayan (MGL)	0–3	Gholamreza Mohammadi (IRI)
Herman Kantoyeu (BLR)	4–10 Fall	Namig Abdullayev (AZE)

=== Round 5 ===
	Score	
Semifinals
Maulen Mamyrov (KAZ)	0–3	Jin Ju-dong (PRK)
Wilfredo García (CUB)	4–0	Maksim Molonov (RUS)
Repechage
Adkhamjon Achilov (UZB)	3–4	Ivan Tsonov (BUL)
Oleksandr Zakharuk (UKR)	3–2	Nurdin Donbaev (KGZ)
Gholamreza Mohammadi (IRI)	1–0	Namig Abdullayev (AZE)

=== Round 6 ===
	Score	
Repechage
Ivan Tsonov (BUL)	1–3	Oleksandr Zakharuk (UKR)
Gholamreza Mohammadi (IRI)		Bye

=== Round 7 ===
	Score	
Repechage
Maulen Mamyrov (KAZ)	2–1	Gholamreza Mohammadi (IRI)
Oleksandr Zakharuk (UKR)	5–1	Maksim Molonov (RUS)

=== Finals ===
	Score	
5th place match
Gholamreza Mohammadi (IRI)	WO	Maksim Molonov (RUS)
Bronze medal match
Maulen Mamyrov (KAZ)	7–1	Oleksandr Zakharuk (UKR)
Final
Jin Ju-dong (PRK)	2–3	Wilfredo García (CUB)
