= 2001 World Wrestling Championships – Men's freestyle 54 kg =

Men's freestyle 54 kg at the 2001 World Championships
- Venue: Winter Sports Palace
- Dates: 22–24 November 2001
- Competitors: 26 from 26 nations

Medalists
gold medal	Herman Kantoyeu	Belarus
silver medal	Babak Nourzad	Iran
bronze medal	Aleksandr Kontoev	Russia

The men's freestyle 54 kilograms is a competition featured at the 2001 World Wrestling Championships, and was held at the Winter Sports Palace in Sofia, Bulgaria from 22 to 24 November 2001.

== Results ==
=== Preliminary round ===
==== Pool 1 ====
Pos	Athlete	Pld	W	L	CP	TP	MGL	BUL	SVK
1	Tümendembereliin Züünbayan (MGL)	2	2	0	6	9	—	5–3	4–1
2	Ivan Djorev (BUL)	2	1	1	4	6	1–3 PP	—	3–1
3	Roman Kollar (SVK)	2	0	2	2	2	1–3 PP	1–3 PP	—

Source: Official website

==== Pool 2 ====
Pos	Athlete	Pld	W	L	CP	TP	RUS	CAN	CUB
1	Aleksandr Kontoev (RUS)	2	2	0	6	14	—	8–6	6–3
2	Mikheil Japaridze (CAN)	2	1	1	4	9	1–3 PP	—	3–2
3	Wilfredo García (CUB)	2	0	2	2	5	1–3 PP	1–3 PP	—

Source: Official website

==== Pool 3 ====
Pos	Athlete	Pld	W	L	CP	TP	GEO	KGZ	VIE
1	Gocha Kirkitadze (GEO)	2	2	0	6	13	—	10–5	3–1
2	Nurdin Donbaev (KGZ)	2	1	1	5	15	1–3 PP	—	10–0
3	Tạ Đình Đức (VIE)	2	0	2	1	1	1–3 PP	0–4 ST	—

Source: Official website

==== Pool 4 ====
Pos	Athlete	Pld	W	L	CP	TP	IRI	UKR	RSA
1	Babak Nourzad (IRI)	2	2	0	7	17	—	6–1	11–1
2	Oleksandr Zakharuk (UKR)	2	1	1	5	11	1–3 PP	—	10–0
3	Shaun Williams (RSA)	2	0	2	1	1	1–4 SP	0–4 ST	—

Source: Official website

==== Pool 5 ====
Pos	Athlete	Pld	W	L	CP	TP	AZE	JPN	NZL
1	Arif Farmanov (AZE)	2	2	0	7	7	—	7–4	WO
2	Yuki Nagao (JPN)	2	1	1	5	4	1–3 PP	—	WO
3	Martin Liddle (NZL)	2	0	2	0	0	0–4 PA	0–4 PA	—

Source: Official website

==== Pool 6 ====
Pos	Athlete	Pld	W	L	CP	TP	BLR	USA	IND
1	Herman Kantoyeu (BLR)	2	2	0	6	13	—	7–6	6–2
2	Stephen Abas (USA)	2	1	1	4	14	1–3 PP	—	8–1
3	Kripa Shankar Patel (IND)	2	0	2	2	3	1–3 PP	1–3 PP	—

Source: Official website

==== Pool 7 ====
Pos	Athlete	Pld	W	L	CP	TP	UZB	GRE	ROM	KOR
1	Dilshod Mansurov (UZB)	3	3	0	10	23	—	4–3	11–0	8–3
2	Amiran Kardanov (GRE)	3	2	1	8	21	1–3 PP	—	7–2	11–0
3	Ion Blidari (ROM)	3	1	2	5	6	0–4 ST	1–3 PP	—	4–3 Fall
4	Kim Hyo-sub (KOR)	3	0	3	1	6	1–3 PP	0–4 ST	0–4 TO	—

Source: Official website

==== Pool 8 ====
Pos	Athlete	Pld	W	L	CP	TP	KAZ	TUR	MDA	VEN
1	Maulen Mamyrov (KAZ)	3	3	0	11	32	—	11–7	11–1	10–0
2	Mevlana Kulaç (TUR)	3	2	1	9	27	1–3 PP	—	8–11 Fall	12–0
3	Ghenadie Tulbea (MDA)	3	1	2	5	22	1–4 SP	0–4 TO	—	10–0
4	Héctor Camacho (VEN)	3	0	3	0	0	0–4 ST	0–4 ST	0–4 ST	—

Source: Official website

=== Knockout round ===
Quarterfinals
Tümendembereliin Züünbayan (MGL)	3
Aleksandr Kontoev (RUS)	6
Gocha Kirkitadze (GEO)	2
Babak Nourzad (IRI)	6
Arif Farmanov (AZE)	0
Herman Kantoyeu (BLR)	5
Dilshod Mansurov (UZB)	1
Maulen Mamyrov (KAZ)	12

Semifinals
Aleksandr Kontoev (RUS)	1
Babak Nourzad (IRI)	5
Herman Kantoyeu (BLR)	4
Maulen Mamyrov (KAZ)	2

Final
Babak Nourzad (IRI)	1
Herman Kantoyeu (BLR)	5
Bronze medal match
Aleksandr Kontoev (RUS)	4
Maulen Mamyrov (KAZ)	1
