= 2003 World Wrestling Championships – Men's freestyle 55 kg =

Men's freestyle 55 kg at the 2003 World Championships
- Venue: Madison Square Garden
- Dates: 12–14 September 2003
- Competitors: 31 from 31 nations

Medalists
gold medal	Dilshod Mansurov	Uzbekistan
silver medal	Ghenadie Tulbea	Moldova
bronze medal	Oleksandr Zakharuk	Ukraine

The men's freestyle 55 kilograms is a competition featured at the 2003 World Wrestling Championships, and was held at the Madison Square Garden in New York, United States from 12 to 14 September 2003.

== Results ==
=== Preliminary round ===
==== Pool 1 ====
Pos	Athlete	Pld	W	L	CP	TP	MGL	BUL	KGZ
1	Bayaraagiin Naranbaatar (MGL)	2	1	1	4	9	—	7–3	2–5
2	Ivan Djorev (BUL)	2	1	1	4	7	1–3 PP	—	4–2
3	Nurdin Donbaev (KGZ)	2	1	1	4	7	3–1 PP	1–3 PP	—

Source: Official website

==== Pool 2 ====
Pos	Athlete	Pld	W	L	CP	TP	IRI	ARM	CHN
1	Mohammad Aslani (IRI)	2	2	0	6	12	—	7–6	5–4
2	Martin Berberyan (ARM)	2	1	1	4	11	1–3 PP	—	5–1
3	Li Zhengyu (CHN)	2	0	2	2	5	1–3 PP	1–3 PP	—

Source: Official website

==== Pool 3 ====
Pos	Athlete	Pld	W	L	CP	TP	KAZ	IND	CZE
1	Bauyrzhan Orazgaliyev (KAZ)	2	2	0	6	10	—	4–0	6–0
2	Kripa Shankar Patel (IND)	2	1	1	3	9	0–3 PO	—	9–0
3	Luděk Burian (CZE)	2	0	2	0	0	0–3 PO	0–3 PO	—

Source: Official website

==== Pool 4 ====
Pos	Athlete	Pld	W	L	CP	TP	GRE	GEO	SVK
1	Amiran Kardanov (GRE)	2	2	0	6	7	—	3–2	4–3
2	Besarion Gochashvili (GEO)	2	1	1	4	7	1–3 PP	—	5–2
3	Roman Kollar (SVK)	2	0	2	2	5	1–3 PP	1–3 PP	—

Source: Official website

==== Pool 5 ====
Pos	Athlete	Pld	W	L	CP	TP	MDA	ROM	COL
1	Ghenadie Tulbea (MDA)	2	2	0	7	19	—	8–0	11–1
2	Aurel Cimpoeru (ROM)	2	1	1	3	6	0–3 PO	—	6–5
3	Fredy Serrano (COL)	2	0	2	2	6	1–4 SP	1–3 PP	—

Source: Official website

==== Pool 6 ====
Pos	Athlete	Pld	W	L	CP	TP	USA	RUS	AZE
1	Stephen Abas (USA)	2	2	0	6	7	—	4–2	3–1
2	Mavlet Batirov (RUS)	2	1	1	5	2	1–3 PP	—	WO
3	Namig Abdullayev (AZE)	2	0	2	1	1	1–3 PP	0–4 PA	—

Source: Official website

==== Pool 7 ====
Pos	Athlete	Pld	W	L	CP	TP	UZB	KOR	PAN
1	Dilshod Mansurov (UZB)	2	2	0	7	17	—	7–1	10–0 Fall
2	Yang Jae-hoon (KOR)	2	1	1	5	13	1–3 PP	—	12–0
3	Antonio González (PAN)	2	0	2	0	0	0–4 TO	0–4 ST	—

Source: Official website

==== Pool 8 ====
Pos	Athlete	Pld	W	L	CP	TP	JPN	CAN	BLR
1	Chikara Tanabe (JPN)	2	2	0	6	15	—	4–1	11–10
2	Mikheil Japaridze (CAN)	2	1	1	5	8	1–3 PP	—	7–1 Fall
3	Herman Kantoyeu (BLR)	2	0	2	1	11	1–3 PP	0–4 TO	—

Source: Official website

==== Pool 9 ====
Pos	Athlete	Pld	W	L	CP	TP	TUR	GER	HUN
1	Ramazan Demir (TUR)	2	2	0	6	9	—	3–2	6–0
2	Vasilij Zeiher (GER)	2	1	1	4	8	1–3 PP	—	6–0
3	Zoltán Dobozi (HUN)	2	0	2	0	0	0–3 PO	0–3 PO	—

Source: Official website

==== Pool 10 ====
Pos	Athlete	Pld	W	L	CP	TP	UKR	RSA	ESP	TKM
1	Oleksandr Zakharuk (UKR)	3	3	0	12	31	—	10–0	10–0	11–0
2	Shaun Williams (RSA)	3	2	1	6	16	0–4 ST	—	7–0	9–3
3	Francisco Sánchez (ESP)	3	1	2	4	11	0–4 ST	0–3 PO	—	11–0
4	Şanazar Amannazarow (TKM)	3	0	3	1	3	0–4 ST	1–3 PP	0–4 ST	—

Source: Official website

=== Knockout round ===
Round of 16
Bayaraagiin Naranbaatar (MGL)	0
Mohammad Aslani (IRI)	3
Bauyrzhan Orazgaliyev (KAZ)	2
Amiran Kardanov (GRE)	2

Quarterfinals
Mohammad Aslani (IRI)	6
Amiran Kardanov (GRE)	3
Ghenadie Tulbea (MDA)	10
Stephen Abas (USA)	8
Dilshod Mansurov (UZB)	5
Chikara Tanabe (JPN)	2
Ramazan Demir (TUR)	0
Oleksandr Zakharuk (UKR)	10

Semifinals
Mohammad Aslani (IRI)	3
Ghenadie Tulbea (MDA)	13
Dilshod Mansurov (UZB)	5
Oleksandr Zakharuk (UKR)	4

Final
Ghenadie Tulbea (MDA)	4
Dilshod Mansurov (UZB)	7
Bronze medal match
Mohammad Aslani (IRI)	2
Oleksandr Zakharuk (UKR)	5
