= Wrestling at the 1998 Asian Games – Men's freestyle 54 kg =

Men's freestyle 54 kg at the 1998 Asian Games
- Venue: Thammasat Gymnasium 1
- Dates: 16–17 December 1998
- Competitors: 13 from 13 nations

Medalists
| gold medal | Jin Ju-dong | North Korea |
| silver medal | Behnam Tayyebi | Iran |
| bronze medal | Maulen Mamyrov | Kazakhstan |

The men's freestyle 54 kilograms wrestling competition at the 1998 Asian Games in Bangkok was held on 16 December and 17 December at the Thammasat Gymnasium 1.

The gold and silver medalists were determined by the final match of the main single-elimination bracket. The losers advanced to the repechage. These matches determined the bronze medalist for the event.

== Schedule ==
All times are Indochina Time (UTC+07:00)

| Date | Time | Event |
|---|---|---|
| Wednesday, 16 December 1998 | 09:00 | Round 1 |
| Wednesday, 16 December 1998 | 16:00 | Round 2 |
| Wednesday, 16 December 1998 | 16:00 | Round 3 |
| Thursday, 17 December 1998 | 09:00 | Round 4 |
| Thursday, 17 December 1998 | 09:00 | Round 5 |
| Thursday, 17 December 1998 | 16:00 | Finals |

== Results ==
=== Round 1 ===
| | Score | | CP |
1/8 finals
| Niu Pinghui (CHN) | 10–0 | Đới Đăng Hỷ (VIE) | 4–0 ST |
| Adkhamjon Achilov (UZB) | 4–2 | Jung Soon-won (KOR) | 3–1 PP |
| Tümendembereliin Züünbayan (MGL) | 10–0 | Rommel Donggon (PHI) | 4–0 ST |
| Nurdin Donbaev (KGZ) | 0–5 | Maulen Mamyrov (KAZ) | 0–3 PO |
| Behnam Tayyebi (IRI) | 3–2 | Chikara Tanabe (JPN) | 3–1 PP |
| Werapol Cottram (THA) | 0–10 | Jin Ju-dong (PRK) | 0–4 ST |
| Kripa Shankar Patel (IND) | | Bye | |

=== Round 2 ===
| | Score | | CP |
Quarterfinals
| Kripa Shankar Patel (IND) | 5–6 | Niu Pinghui (CHN) | 1–3 PP |
| Adkhamjon Achilov (UZB) | 6–2 | Tümendembereliin Züünbayan (MGL) | 3–1 PP |
| Maulen Mamyrov (KAZ) | 0–3 | Behnam Tayyebi (IRI) | 0–3 PO |
| Jin Ju-dong (PRK) | | Bye | |
Repechage
| Đới Đăng Hỷ (VIE) | 0–3 | Jung Soon-won (KOR) | 0–3 PO |
| Rommel Donggon (PHI) | 0–10 | Nurdin Donbaev (KGZ) | 0–4 ST |
| Chikara Tanabe (JPN) | 11–0 | Werapol Cottram (THA) | 0–4 ST |

=== Round 3 ===
| | Score | | CP |
Semifinals
| Jin Ju-dong (PRK) | 11–0 | Niu Pinghui (CHN) | 4–0 ST |
| Adkhamjon Achilov (UZB) | 5–8 | Behnam Tayyebi (IRI) | 1–3 PP |
Repechage
| Jung Soon-won (KOR) | 5–3 | Nurdin Donbaev (KGZ) | 3–1 PP |
| Chikara Tanabe (JPN) | 10–4 | Kripa Shankar Patel (IND) | 3–1 PP |
| Tümendembereliin Züünbayan (MGL) | 0–4 | Maulen Mamyrov (KAZ) | 0–3 PO |

=== Round 4 ===
| | Score | | CP |
Repechage
| Jung Soon-won (KOR) | 3–0 | Chikara Tanabe (JPN) | 3–0 PO |
| Maulen Mamyrov (KAZ) | | Bye | |

=== Round 5 ===
| | Score | | CP |
Repechage
| Niu Pinghui (CHN) | 7–9 | Jung Soon-won (KOR) | 1–3 PP |
| Maulen Mamyrov (KAZ) | 3–2 | Adkhamjon Achilov (UZB) | 3–1 PP |

=== Finals ===
| | Score | | CP |
Bronze medal match
| Jung Soon-won (KOR) | 3–5 | Maulen Mamyrov (KAZ) | 1–3 PP |
Gold medal match
| Jin Ju-dong (PRK) | 3–2 | Behnam Tayyebi (IRI) | 3–1 PP |

== Final standing ==
| Rank | Athlete |
|---|---|
| 1st place, gold medalist(s) | Jin Ju-dong (PRK) |
| 2nd place, silver medalist(s) | Behnam Tayyebi (IRI) |
| 3rd place, bronze medalist(s) | Maulen Mamyrov (KAZ) |
| 4 | Jung Soon-won (KOR) |
| 5 | Niu Pinghui (CHN) |
| 6 | Adkhamjon Achilov (UZB) |
| 7 | Chikara Tanabe (JPN) |
| 8 | Nurdin Donbaev (KGZ) |
| 9 | Tümendembereliin Züünbayan (MGL) |
| 10 | Kripa Shankar Patel (IND) |
| 11 | Rommel Donggon (PHI) |
| 11 | Werapol Cottram (THA) |
| 11 | Đới Đăng Hỷ (VIE) |
