= 2002 World Wrestling Championships – Men's freestyle 55 kg =

Men's freestyle 55 kg at the 2002 World Championships
- Venue: Azadi Indoor Stadium
- Dates: 5–6 September 2002
- Competitors: 24 from 24 nations

Medalists
gold medal	René Montero	Cuba
silver medal	Namig Abdullayev	Azerbaijan
bronze medal	Oleksandr Zakharuk	Ukraine

The men's freestyle 55 kilograms is a competition featured at the 2002 World Wrestling Championships, and was held at the Azadi Indoor Stadium in Tehran, Iran from 5 to 6 September 2002.

== Results ==
=== Preliminary round ===
==== Pool 1 ====
Pos	Athlete	Pld	W	L	CP	TP	UZB	KOR	MDA
1	Adkhamjon Achilov (UZB)	2	1	1	5	11	—	1–3	10–0
2	Oh Jun-seok (KOR)	2	1	1	4	4	3–1 PP	—	1–6
3	Ghenadie Tulbea (MDA)	2	1	1	3	6	0–4 ST	3–1 PP	—

Source: Official website

==== Pool 2 ====
Pos	Athlete	Pld	W	L	CP	TP	JPN	BUL	VEN
1	Chikara Tanabe (JPN)	2	2	0	7	14	—	3–2	11–0
2	Ivan Djorev (BUL)	2	1	1	5	12	1–3 PP	—	10–0
3	Héctor Camacho (VEN)	2	0	2	0	0	0–4 ST	0–4 ST	—

Source: Official website

==== Pool 3 ====
Pos	Athlete	Pld	W	L	CP	TP	MGL	TUR	ESP
1	Tümendembereliin Züünbayan (MGL)	2	2	0	7	15	—	5–4	10–0
2	Ersin Çetin (TUR)	2	1	1	5	14	1–3 PP	—	10–0
3	Francisco Sánchez (ESP)	2	0	2	0	0	0–4 ST	0–4 ST	—

Source: Official website

==== Pool 4 ====
Pos	Athlete	Pld	W	L	CP	TP	AZE	IND	TKM
1	Namig Abdullayev (AZE)	2	2	0	7	16	—	5–1	11–0
2	Krishan Kumar (IND)	2	1	1	5	18	1–3 PP	—	17–12 Fall
3	Rowşan Seýidow (TKM)	2	0	2	0	12	0–4 ST	0–4 TO	—

Source: Official website

==== Pool 5 ====
Pos	Athlete	Pld	W	L	CP	TP	CUB	IRI	GER
1	René Montero (CUB)	2	2	0	6	14	—	4–2	10–1
2	Babak Nourzad (IRI)	2	1	1	4	10	1–3 PP	—	8–4
3	Vasilij Zeiher (GER)	2	0	2	2	5	1–3 PP	1–3 PP	—

Source: Official website

==== Pool 6 ====
Pos	Athlete	Pld	W	L	CP	TP	ARM	RUS	BLR
1	Martin Berberyan (ARM)	2	1	1	4	6	—	3–2	3–4
2	Aleksandr Kontoev (RUS)	2	1	1	4	6	1–3 PP	—	4–1
3	Aliaksandr Karnitski (BLR)	2	1	1	4	5	3–1 PP	1–3 PP	—

Source: Official website

==== Pool 7 ====
Pos	Athlete	Pld	W	L	CP	TP	UKR	CHN	GEO
1	Oleksandr Zakharuk (UKR)	2	2	0	6	9	—	6–2	3–1
2	Meng Haibo (CHN)	2	1	1	4	6	1–3 PP	—	4–1
3	Besarion Gochashvili (GEO)	2	0	2	2	2	1–3 PP	1–3 PP	—

Source: Official website

==== Pool 8 ====
Pos	Athlete	Pld	W	L	CP	TP	KGZ	GRE	CAN
1	Oularbek Tuganbai (KGZ)	2	2	0	6	10	—	6–3	4–1
2	Amiran Kardanov (GRE)	2	1	1	4	9	1–3 PP	—	6–1
3	Mikheil Japaridze (CAN)	2	0	2	2	2	1–3 PP	1–3 PP	—

Source: Official website

=== Knockout round ===
Quarterfinals
Adkhamjon Achilov (UZB)	5
Chikara Tanabe (JPN)	3
Tümendembereliin Züünbayan (MGL)	0
Namig Abdullayev (AZE)	3
René Montero (CUB)	5
Martin Berberyan (ARM)	4
Oleksandr Zakharuk (UKR)	5
Oularbek Tuganbai (KGZ)	1

Semifinals
Adkhamjon Achilov (UZB)	1
Namig Abdullayev (AZE)	3
René Montero (CUB)	4
Oleksandr Zakharuk (UKR)	2

Final
Namig Abdullayev (AZE)	1
René Montero (CUB)	4
Bronze medal match
Adkhamjon Achilov (UZB)	1
Oleksandr Zakharuk (UKR)	3
