= Wrestling at the 1996 Summer Olympics – Men's freestyle 52 kg =

Men's freestyle 52 kg at the Games of the XXVI Olympiad
- Venue: Georgia World Congress Center
- Dates: 1–2 August 1996
- Competitors: 19 from 19 nations

Medalists
| 1st place, gold medalist(s) | | Valentin Yordanov | Bulgaria |
| 2nd place, silver medalist(s) | | Namig Abdullayev | Azerbaijan |
| 3rd place, bronze medalist(s) | | Maulen Mamyrov | Kazakhstan |

The men's freestyle 52 kilograms at the 1996 Summer Olympics as part of the wrestling program were held at the Georgia World Congress Center from August 1 to August 2. The gold and silver medalists were determined by the final match of the main single-elimination bracket. The losers advanced to the repechage. These matches determined the bronze medalist.

== Results ==
Legend

- WO — Won by walkover

=== Round 1 ===
| | Score | | CP |
1/16 finals
| Amiran Kardanov (GRE) | 1–11 | Adkhamjon Achilov (UZB) | 1–4 SP |
| Namig Abdullayev (AZE) | 7–0 | Lou Rosselli (USA) | 3–0 PO |
| Hideo Sasayama (JPN) | 6–0 | Roman Kollar (SVK) | 3–0 PO |
| Carlos Varela (CUB) | 0–4 | Gholamreza Mohammadi (IRI) | 0–3 PO |
| Gregory Fitzgerald (AUS) | 0–10 | David Legrand (FRA) | 0–4 ST |
| Maulen Mamyrov (KAZ) | 10–0 | Greg Woodcroft (CAN) | 4–0 ST |
| Omar Kedjaouer (ALG) | 0–10 | Vladimir Toguzov (UKR) | 0–4 ST |
| Víctor Rodríguez (MEX) | 0–10 Fall | Valentin Yordanov (BUL) | 0–4 TO |
| Chechenol Mongush (RUS) | 11–4 | Constantin Corduneanu (ROM) | 3–1 PP |
| Metin Topaktaş (TUR) | | Bye | |

=== Round 2 ===
| | Score | | CP |
1/8 finals
| Metin Topaktaş (TUR) | 5–7 | Adkhamjon Achilov (UZB) | 1–3 PP |
| Namig Abdullayev (AZE) | 11–0 | Hideo Sasayama (JPN) | 4–0 ST |
| Gholamreza Mohammadi (IRI) | 5–0 | David Legrand (FRA) | 3–0 PO |
| Maulen Mamyrov (KAZ) | 3–1 | Vladimir Toguzov (UKR) | 3–1 PP |
| Valentin Yordanov (BUL) | 4–2 | Chechenol Mongush (RUS) | 3–1 PP |
Repechage
| Amiran Kardanov (GRE) | 1–3 | Lou Rosselli (USA) | 1–3 PP |
| Roman Kollar (SVK) | 3–2 | Carlos Varela (CUB) | 3–1 PP |
| Gregory Fitzgerald (AUS) | 0–6 Fall | Greg Woodcroft (CAN) | 0–4 TO |
| Omar Kedjaouer (ALG) | 2–0 | Víctor Rodríguez (MEX) | 3–0 PO |
| Constantin Corduneanu (ROM) | | Bye | |

=== Round 3 ===
| | Score | | CP |
Quarterfinals
| Adkhamjon Achilov (UZB) | 0–11 | Namig Abdullayev (AZE) | 0–4 ST |
| Gholamreza Mohammadi (IRI) | | Bye | |
| Maulen Mamyrov (KAZ) | | Bye | |
| Valentin Yordanov (BUL) | | Bye | |
Repechage
| Constantin Corduneanu (ROM) | 2–4 | Lou Rosselli (USA) | 1–3 PP |
| Roman Kollar (SVK) | 3–6 | Greg Woodcroft (CAN) | 1–3 PP |
| Omar Kedjaouer (ALG) | 0–3 Fall | Metin Topaktaş (TUR) | 0–4 TO |
| Hideo Sasayama (JPN) | 12–5 | David Legrand (FRA) | 3–1 PP |
| Vladimir Toguzov (UKR) | 1–2 | Chechenol Mongush (RUS) | 1–3 PP |

=== Round 4 ===
| | Score | | CP |
Semifinals
| Namig Abdullayev (AZE) | 10–0 | Gholamreza Mohammadi (IRI) | 4–0 ST |
| Maulen Mamyrov (KAZ) | 3–7 | Valentin Yordanov (BUL) | 1–3 PP |
Repechage
| Lou Rosselli (USA) | WO | Greg Woodcroft (CAN) | 0–4 PA |
| Metin Topaktaş (TUR) | 5–1 Fall | Hideo Sasayama (JPN) | 4–0 TO |
| Chechenol Mongush (RUS) | 4–0 Fall | Adkhamjon Achilov (UZB) | 4–0 TO |

=== Round 5 ===
| | Score | | CP |
Repechage
| Greg Woodcroft (CAN) | 1–13 | Metin Topaktaş (TUR) | 1–4 SP |
| Chechenol Mongush (RUS) | | Bye | |

=== Round 6 ===
| | Score | | CP |
Repechage
| Gholamreza Mohammadi (IRI) | 1–3 | Chechenol Mongush (RUS) | 1–3 PP |
| Metin Topaktaş (TUR) | 5–11 | Maulen Mamyrov (KAZ) | 1–3 PP |

=== Finals ===
| | Score | | CP |
Classification 7th–8th
| Greg Woodcroft (CAN) | 0–11 | Adkhamjon Achilov (UZB) | 0–4 ST |
Classification 5th–6th
| Gholamreza Mohammadi (IRI) | 4–2 | Metin Topaktaş (TUR) | 3–1 PP |
Bronze medal match
| Chechenol Mongush (RUS) | 2–3 | Maulen Mamyrov (KAZ) | 1–3 PP |
Gold medal match
| Namig Abdullayev (AZE) | 3–4 | Valentin Yordanov (BUL) | 1–3 PP |

== Final standing ==
| Rank | Athlete |
|---|---|
| 1st place, gold medalist(s) | Valentin Yordanov (BUL) |
| 2nd place, silver medalist(s) | Namig Abdullayev (AZE) |
| 3rd place, bronze medalist(s) | Maulen Mamyrov (KAZ) |
| 4 | Chechenol Mongush (RUS) |
| 5 | Gholamreza Mohammadi (IRI) |
| 6 | Metin Topaktaş (TUR) |
| 7 | Adkhamjon Achilov (UZB) |
| 8 | Greg Woodcroft (CAN) |
| 9 | Hideo Sasayama (JPN) |
| 10 | Vladimir Toguzov (UKR) |
| 11 | Lou Rosselli (USA) |
| 12 | David Legrand (FRA) |
| 13 | Roman Kollar (SVK) |
| 14 | Omar Kedjaouer (ALG) |
| 15 | Constantin Corduneanu (ROM) |
| 16 | Amiran Kardanov (GRE) |
| 17 | Carlos Varela (CUB) |
| 18 | Gregory Fitzgerald (AUS) |
| 18 | Víctor Rodríguez (MEX) |
