= Wrestling at the 2000 Summer Olympics – Men's freestyle 54 kg =

Men's freestyle 54 kg at the Games of the XXVII Olympiad
- Venue: Sydney Convention and Exhibition Centre
- Date: 28–30 September 2000
- Competitors: 19 from 19 nations

Medalists
1st place, gold medalist(s)		Namig Abdullayev	Azerbaijan
2nd place, silver medalist(s)		Sammie Henson	United States
3rd place, bronze medalist(s)		Amiran Kardanov	Greece

The men's freestyle 54 kilograms at the 2000 Summer Olympics as part of the wrestling program was held at the Sydney Convention and Exhibition Centre from September 28 to 30. The competition was held with an elimination system of three or four wrestlers in each pool, with the winners qualifying for the quarterfinals, semifinals and final by way of direct elimination.

== Schedule ==
All times are Australian Eastern Daylight Time (UTC+11:00)

Date	Time	Event
28 September 2000	09:30	Round 1
28 September 2000	09:30	Round 2
28 September 2000	17:00	Round 3
29 September 2000	09:30	Quarterfinals
29 September 2000	17:00	Semifinals
30 September 2000	17:00	Finals

== Results ==
=== Elimination pools ===
==== Pool 1 ====
Pos	Athlete	Pld	W	L	CP	TP	Qualification
1	Sammie Henson (USA)	2	2	0	7	19	Knockout round
2	Chikara Tanabe (JPN)	2	1	1	4	9	
3	Moon Myung-seok (KOR)	2	0	2	1	2	

Source: Official Report

	Score		CP
Moon Myung-seok (KOR)	2–8	Chikara Tanabe (JPN)	1–3 PP
Sammie Henson (USA)	10–0	Moon Myung-seok (KOR)	4–0 ST
Chikara Tanabe (JPN)	1–9	Sammie Henson (USA)	1–3 PP

==== Pool 2 ====
Pos	Athlete	Pld	W	L	CP	TP	Qualification
1	Oleksandr Zakharuk (UKR)	2	2	0	7	13	Knockout round
2	Leonid Chuchunov (RUS)	2	1	1	4	4	
3	Ivan Tsonov (BUL)	2	0	2	0	0	

Source: Official Report

	Score		CP
Leonid Chuchunov (RUS)	0–3	Oleksandr Zakharuk (UKR)	0–3 PO
Ivan Tsonov (BUL)	0–4 Fall	Leonid Chuchunov (RUS)	0–4 TO
Oleksandr Zakharuk (UKR)	10–0	Ivan Tsonov (BUL)	4–0 ST

==== Pool 3 ====
Pos	Athlete	Pld	W	L	CP	TP	Qualification
1	Maulen Mamyrov (KAZ)	2	2	0	6	18	Knockout round
2	Adkhamjon Achilov (UZB)	2	1	1	4	14	
3	Vasilij Zeiher (GER)	2	0	2	2	3	

Source: Official Report

	Score		CP
Adkhamjon Achilov (UZB)	9–2	Vasilij Zeiher (GER)	3–1 PP
Maulen Mamyrov (KAZ)	10–5	Adkhamjon Achilov (UZB)	3–1 PP
Vasilij Zeiher (GER)	1–8	Maulen Mamyrov (KAZ)	1–3 PP

==== Pool 4 ====
Pos	Athlete	Pld	W	L	CP	TP	Qualification
1	Herman Kantoyeu (BLR)	2	1	1	5	9	Knockout round
2	Nurdin Donbaev (KGZ)	2	1	1	4	6	
3	Wilfredo García (CUB)	2	1	1	3	5	

Source: Official Report

	Score		CP
Wilfredo García (CUB)	4–1	Nurdin Donbaev (KGZ)	3–1 PP
Herman Kantoyeu (BLR)	7–1 Fall	Wilfredo García (CUB)	4–0 TO
Nurdin Donbaev (KGZ)	5–2	Herman Kantoyeu (BLR)	3–1 PP

==== Pool 5 ====
Pos	Athlete	Pld	W	L	CP	TP	Qualification
1	Namig Abdullayev (AZE)	2	2	0	7	16	Knockout round
2	Jin Ju-dong (PRK)	2	1	1	4	10	
3	Martin Liddle (NZL)	2	0	2	0	0	

Source: Official Report

	Score		CP
Namig Abdullayev (AZE)	6–0	Jin Ju-dong (PRK)	3–0 PO
Martin Liddle (NZL)	0–10	Namig Abdullayev (AZE)	0–4 ST
Jin Ju-dong (PRK)	10–0	Martin Liddle (NZL)	4–0 ST

==== Pool 6 ====
Pos	Athlete	Pld	W	L	CP	TP	Qualification
1	Amiran Kardanov (GRE)	3	3	0	10	21	Knockout round
2	Vitalie Railean (MDA)	3	2	1	8	15	
3	Behnam Tayyebi (IRI)	3	1	2	4	4	
4	Tümendembereliin Züünbayan (MGL)	3	0	3	1	6	

Source: Official Report

	Score		CP
Tümendembereliin Züünbayan (MGL)	2–3	Behnam Tayyebi (IRI)	1–3 PP
Vitalie Railean (MDA)	1–4	Amiran Kardanov (GRE)	1–3 PP
Tümendembereliin Züünbayan (MGL)	4–12 Fall	Vitalie Railean (MDA)	0–4 TO
Behnam Tayyebi (IRI)	0–7	Amiran Kardanov (GRE)	0–3 PO
Tümendembereliin Züünbayan (MGL)	0–10	Amiran Kardanov (GRE)	0–4 ST
Behnam Tayyebi (IRI)	1–2	Vitalie Railean (MDA)	1–3 PP

=== Knockout round ===
Quarterfinals
Sammie Henson (USA)	8
Oleksandr Zakharuk (UKR)	4
Maulen Mamyrov (KAZ)	2
Herman Kantoyeu (BLR)	4

Semifinals
Sammie Henson (USA)	3
Herman Kantoyeu (BLR)	0
Namig Abdullayev (AZE)	5
Amiran Kardanov (GRE)	3

Gold medal match
Sammie Henson (USA)	3
Namig Abdullayev (AZE)	4
Bronze medal match
Herman Kantoyeu (BLR)	4
Amiran Kardanov (GRE)	5

Classification 5th–6th
Oleksandr Zakharuk (UKR)	8
Maulen Mamyrov (KAZ)	1

== Final standing ==
Rank	Athlete
1st place, gold medalist(s)	Namig Abdullayev (AZE)
2nd place, silver medalist(s)	Sammie Henson (USA)
3rd place, bronze medalist(s)	Amiran Kardanov (GRE)
4	Herman Kantoyeu (BLR)
5	Oleksandr Zakharuk (UKR)
6	Maulen Mamyrov (KAZ)
7	Vitalie Railean (MDA)
8	Adkhamjon Achilov (UZB)
9	Jin Ju-dong (PRK)
10	Chikara Tanabe (JPN)
11	Nurdin Donbaev (KGZ)
12	Leonid Chuchunov (RUS)
13	Behnam Tayyebi (IRI)
14	Wilfredo García (CUB)
15	Vasilij Zeiher (GER)
16	Tümendembereliin Züünbayan (MGL)
17	Moon Myung-seok (KOR)
18	Martin Liddle (NZL)
19	Ivan Tsonov (BUL)
