= 2006 World Wrestling Championships – Men's freestyle 55 kg =

Men's freestyle 55 kg at the 2006 World Championships
- Venue: Tianhe Gymnasium
- Dates: 27 September 2006
- Competitors: 30 from 30 nations

Medalists
gold medal	Radoslav Velikov	Bulgaria
silver medal	Besik Kudukhov	Russia
bronze medal	Namig Abdullayev	Azerbaijan
bronze medal	Sammie Henson	United States

The men's freestyle 55 kilograms is a competition featured at the 2006 World Wrestling Championships, and was held at the Tianhe Gymnasium in Guangzhou, China on 27 September 2006.

This freestyle wrestling competition consists of a single-elimination tournament, with a repechage used to determine the winner of two bronze medals.

== Results ==
Legend

- F — Won by fall

=== Final ===
Final
Besik Kudukhov (RUS)	0	0
Radoslav Velikov (BUL)	6	1

=== Top half ===
Round of 32
Igor Skilskiy (UKR)	3	0	0
Amiran Kardanov (GRE)	2	1	1
Hidenori Taoka (JPN)	1	0
Ghenadie Tulbea (MDA)	2	4
Zhassulan Mukhtarbekuly (KAZ)	1	2
Murat Gençtürk (TUR)	0	0
Iliaz Ozumbekov (KGZ)	0	1
Kim Hyo-sub (KOR)	5	4
Mikheil Japaridze (CAN)	0	1	0
Vinod Kumar (IND)	1	1	3
Besik Kudukhov (RUS)	3	5^{F}
Phạm Đức Kháng (VIE)	1	0

Round of 16
Besarion Gochashvili (GEO)	0	0
Namig Abdullayev (AZE)	7	1
Amiran Kardanov (GRE)	0	3	6
Ghenadie Tulbea (MDA)	1	0	5
Zhassulan Mukhtarbekuly (KAZ)	5	2	1
Kim Hyo-sub (KOR)	9	1	3
Vinod Kumar (IND)	0	0
Besik Kudukhov (RUS)	1	6

Quarterfinals
Namig Abdullayev (AZE)	1	1
Amiran Kardanov (GRE)	0	0
Kim Hyo-sub (KOR)	1	2	0
Besik Kudukhov (RUS)	3	1	6^{F}

Semifinals
Namig Abdullayev (AZE)	0	0
Besik Kudukhov (RUS)	3	1

=== Bottom half ===
Round of 32
O Song-nam (PRK)	3	5
Pavel Siniavski (ISR)	0	0
Qin Yi (CHN)	1	0
Radoslav Velikov (BUL)	3	3^{F}
Viorel Etko (GBR)	2	0
Fredy Serrano (COL)	4	3
Adkhamjon Achilov (UZB)	1	1	6
Vahan Simonyan (ARM)	1	0	1
Elgin Loren Elwais (PLW)	0	0
Taghi Dadashi (IRI)	6	4
Bayaraagiin Naranbaatar (MGL)	4	4
Jerry Angana (PHI)	0	1
René Montero (CUB)	2	0	0
Sammie Henson (USA)	1	1	6
Uladzislau Andreyeu (BLR)	0	3
Francisco Sánchez (ESP)	1	3

Round of 16
O Song-nam (PRK)	0	0
Radoslav Velikov (BUL)	2	1
Fredy Serrano (COL)	2	0
Adkhamjon Achilov (UZB)	5	8
Taghi Dadashi (IRI)	0	2	6
Bayaraagiin Naranbaatar (MGL)	4	1	0
Sammie Henson (USA)	3	6
Francisco Sánchez (ESP)	0	0

Quarterfinals
Radoslav Velikov (BUL)	1	5
Adkhamjon Achilov (UZB)	0	1
Taghi Dadashi (IRI)	1	0
Sammie Henson (USA)	0	5^{F}

Semifinals
Radoslav Velikov (BUL)	4	7
Sammie Henson (USA)	0	1

=== Repechage ===
Repechage round 1
Phạm Đức Kháng (VIE)	0	0
Vinod Kumar (IND)	1	6
Qin Yi (CHN)	0	1
O Song-nam (PRK)	1	2

Repechage round 2
Vinod Kumar (IND)	0	1
Kim Hyo-sub (KOR)	3	1
O Song-nam (PRK)	4	1
Adkhamjon Achilov (UZB)	0	3^{F}

Bronze medals
Kim Hyo-sub (KOR)	1	1	0
Namig Abdullayev (AZE)	0	2	1
Adkhamjon Achilov (UZB)	1	0
Sammie Henson (USA)	2	2
