= Azerbaijan Wrestling Federation =

Wrestling governing body in Azerbaijan

- Azərbaycan Güləş Federasiyası
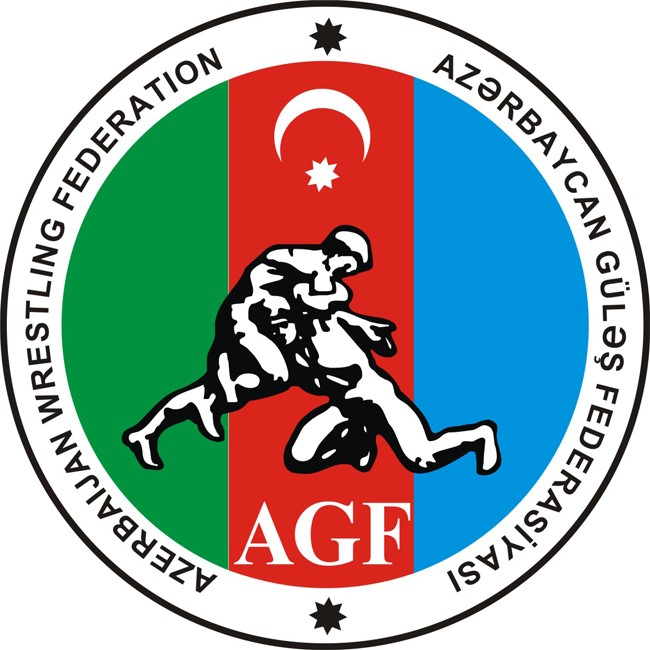
- Abbreviation: AWF
- Location: Baku, Azerbaijan
- Website: awf.az

Azerbaijan Wrestling Federation (AWF; Azerbaijani: Azərbaycan Güləş Federasiyası) is an organization which ensures the development and regulation of wrestling as a sport in Azerbaijan. The Federation was established in 1993. On December 8, 2021, an extraordinary meeting of the General Assembly of Azerbaijan Wrestling Federation was held, and Mikayil Jabbarov was elected the president of the Federation.

== Establishment ==
1993 – The Federation was founded.

1993 – AWF became a member of the International Association of Wrestling Federations (FILA).

The presidents of Azerbaijan Wrestling Federation: Etibar Mammadov (1993–1997), Abbas Abbasov (1997–2007), Fazil Mammadov (2007–2018) and Namig Aliyev (2018–2021).

In 2021, an extraordinary meeting of the General Assembly of Azerbaijan Wrestling Federation was held, and Mikayil Jabbarov was elected the president of the Federation.

== Rights and obligations ==
AWF is a non-governmental organization that ensures the development of wrestling in Azerbaijan and carries out activities based on the principles of volunteerism and equality of sporting clubs and societies, as well as their members. The activity of the federation envisages the territory of the Republic of Azerbaijan. The rights and obligations of Azerbaijan Wrestling Federation are regulated by the law "On physical education and sports".

== Activities and organized competitions ==
2002 – The European Men's Freestyle Wrestling Championships was held in Baku.

2004 – The World Cup in freestyle wrestling was held in Azerbaijan.

2007 – The World Wrestling Championships was held in Azerbaijan, where 797 athletes from 92 countries competed for victory.

2010 – The European Wrestling Championships was held in Azerbaijan.

2012 – The World Cup in freestyle wrestling was held in Azerbaijan.

2012 – The World Junior Wrestling Championships was held in Baku.

2022 – For the first time, the Greco-Roman World Cup was organized in Azerbaijan.

== The main achievements of Azerbaijani wrestlers ==
=== Olympic Games ===
1996–2024 – Azerbaijani wrestlers won 28 of the 49 medals in the last 8 Olympic Games, which the Azerbaijani team had participated in.

Year	Host country	Gold	Silver	Bronze	Overall
2024	France	0	0	3	3
2020	Japan	0	1	2	3
2016	Brazil	0	3	6	9
2012	The United Kingdom	2	2	3	7
2008	China	0	1	2	3
2004	Greece	1	0	0	1
2000	Australia	1	0	0	1
1996	USA	0	1	0	1
	Total	4	8	16	28

=== World Championships ===
In 1993–2022, Azerbaijani wrestlers won 85 medals at the senior world championships.

The best result was achieved at the 2009 World Championships held in Herning, Denmark, where Azerbaijani wrestlers won 10 (3 gold, 4 silver, 3 bronze) medals.

In 2009, the best result was recorded in freestyle wrestling. The Azerbaijani wrestling team became the second in the world in Denmark.

At the 2023 World Championships, the Azerbaijani Greco-Roman wrestling team became the world champion.

In 2009, the national team of Azerbaijan became the world champion in women's freestyle.

Year	Host country	Gold	Silver	Bronze	Overall
1994	Turkey	0	1	0	3
1994	Finland	0	2	0	3
1998	Iran	0	1	0	1
2002	Iran	0	1	0	2
2002	Russia	0	1	0	2
2003	USA	1	0	0	1
2006	China	0	1	1	2
2007	Azerbaijan	1	0	1	2
2008	Japan	0	0	1	1
2009	Denmark	3	4	3	10
2010	Russia	2	2	3	7
2011	Turkey	2	1	5	8
2013	Hungary	0	2	2	4
2014	Uzbekistan	1	3	3	7
2015	USA	2	4	2	8
2016	Hungary	0	0	2	2
2017	France	1	0	2	3
2018	Hungary	1	2	2	5
2019	Kazakhstan	1	3	2	6
2021	Norway	1	1	4	6
2022	Serbia	1	1	5	7
2023	Serbia	2	5	-	7
2024	Albania	3	-	-	3
2025	Croatia	1	2	5	8
	Total	23	37	43	103

=== European championships ===
Azerbaijani wrestlers have won 166 medals at senior continental championships, which they have been participating in since 1992.

2009 – Men's freestyle team won the European Championships in the team standing.

2017 – Men's freestyle team claimed the European crown.

2018 – 18 (4 gold, 5 silver, 9 bronze) medals won at the European Championship held in Kaspiysk, Russia. This was the best result for Azerbaijani wrestlers at the continental championships.

2022 – Men's freestyle team became the European champion.

2022 – Men's Greco-Roman team became the European champion.

2011 – Women's freestyle team took the 2nd place.

Year	Host country	Gold	Silver	Bronze	Overall
1993	Turkey	1	2	0	3
1994	Italy	1	0	0	1
1995	Switzerland	2	0	1	3
1996	Hungary	1	0	2	3
1997	Poland	0	1	0	1
1998	Belarus	0	1	0	1
1999	Bulgaria	0	0	1	1
2002	Azerbaijan	1	1	1	3
2003	Latvia	1	0	0	1
2004	Turkey	0	0	1	1
2005	Bulgaria	1	1	0	2
2006	Russia	0	1	2	3
2007	Bulgaria	1	0	1	2
2008	Finland	2	1	4	7
2009	Lithuania	5	2	2	9
2010	Azerbaijan	7	2	1	10
2011	Germany	6	0	8	14
2012	Serbia	2	0	4	6
2013	Georgia	0	1	6	7
2014	Finland	3	5	2	10
2016	Latvia	2	2	4	8
2017	Serbia	2	3	3	8
2018	Russia	4	5	9	18
2019	Romania	4	2	7	14
2020	Italy	2	2	9	13
2021	Poland	1	2	5	8
2022	Hungary	3	6	7	16
2023	Croatia	5	6	3	14
2024	Romania	5	3	8	16
	Total	68	51	98	217

=== World Cup ===
2004 – Men's freestyle team won the cup after defeating the Russian team in the finals of the competition held in Baku.

2009 – Men's freestyle team won the cup for the second time after defeating the host team in the finals of the competition held in Iran.

2015 – Men's Greco-Roman team won the World Cup after defeating the Russian team in the finals of the competition held in Tehran.
