= Lou Rosselli =

American wrestler (born 1970)

Current position
- Title: Assistant coach
- Team: Pittsburgh
- Conference: ACC

Biographical details
- Born: July 13, 1970; New York, New York, U.S.

Playing career
- 1989–1993: Edinboro

Coaching career (HC unless noted)
- 1995–1998: Edinboro (Volunteer assistant)
- 1998–2006: Edinboro (assistant)
- 2006–2009: Ohio State (assistant)
- 2009–2016: Ohio State (AHC)
- 2016–2023: Oklahoma
- 2024–present: Pittsburgh (assistant)

Accomplishments and honors

Championships
- Big 12 (2021)

Medal record

Men's freestyle wrestling

Representing the United States

World Cup
Gold medal – first place	1997 Stillwater	54 kg

Pan American Championships
Silver medal – second place	1998 Winnipeg	54 kg
Silver medal – second place	2000 Cali	54 kg

Collegiate Wrestling

Representing the Edinboro Fighting Scots

NCAA Division I Championships
Bronze medal – third place	1993 Ames	118 lb

Lou Rosselli (born July 13, 1970) is an American former wrestler. He competed in the men's freestyle 52 kg at the 1996 Summer Olympics. From 2016 to 2023 he was the head wrestling coach at the University of Oklahoma. Before his time with the Sooners, Rosselli was an associate head coach at Ohio State University.

== Wrestling career ==
Rosselli attended Royalton-Hartland High School in Middleport, New York, where he was a four-time state qualifier and two-time NYSPHSAA champion. In 1986 he won the title in the 98 pound weight class, two years later he won his second title at 112 pounds. After 5 years of varsity wrestling, Rosselli continued his career at Edinboro University of Pennsylvania, where he saw continued success. He won the PSAC championship in the 118-pound weight class three times, additionally qualifying for the NCAA Division I Wrestling Championships each year from 1989 to 1991. Post-college, Rosselli won the U.S. Open championship in 1995, 1996, and 1999. He also qualified and competed in the 1996 Summer Olympics in Atlanta, Georgia. Here he won matches against Amiran Kardanov of Greece and Constantin Corduneanu of Romania. He was forced to withdraw from the tournament in the fourth round after breaking his arm in the match against Corduneanu. In 2024, he was hired as an assistant coach at Pittsburgh.

== Lou Rosselli Day ==
On Thursday, January 11, 1996, the Mayor Don Piedmont of Middleport proclaimed "Lou Rosselli Day" in honor of their home grown Olympian as he departed for Atlanta. A banner urging him to "go for the gold" hung above main street, and every shop window held posters wishing him luck.
