= Tayyebi =

Tayyebi is a surname. It may refer to:

- Behnam Tayyebi Kermani (born 1975), Iranian wrestler
- Hossein Tayyebi Bidgoli (born 1988), Iranian futsal player
- Mohammad Tayyebi, Iranian footballer
- Mostafa Tayyebi (born 1987), Iranian futsal player
