= Adkhamjon =

Adkhamjon is an Uzbek masculine given name. Notable people with the name include:

- Adkhamjon Achilov (born 1976), Uzbek wrestler
- Adkhamjon Ergashev (born 1999), Uzbek weightlifter
- Adkhamjon Janobiddinov (born 2005), Uzbek journalist
