= 2006 World Wrestling Championships – Men's Greco-Roman 96 kg =

Men's Greco-Roman 96 kg at the 2006 World Championships
- Venue: Tianhe Gymnasium
- Dates: 26 September 2006
- Competitors: 27 from 27 nations

Medalists
gold medal	Heiki Nabi	Estonia
silver medal	Marek Švec	Czech Republic
bronze medal	Kaloyan Dinchev	Bulgaria
bronze medal	Hamza Yerlikaya	Turkey

The men's Greco-Roman 96 kilograms is a competition featured at the 2006 World Wrestling Championships, and was held at the Tianhe Gymnasium in Guangzhou, China on 26 September 2006.

This Greco-Roman wrestling competition consists of a single-elimination tournament, with a repechage used to determine the winner of two bronze medals.

== Results ==
Legend

- F — Won by fall
- R — Retired

=== Final ===
Final
Heiki Nabi (EST)	1	1
Marek Švec (CZE)	1	1

=== Top half ===
Round of 32
Rami Hietaniemi (FIN)	1	0
Justin Ruiz (USA)	1	2
Reza Farzizadeh (IRI)	0	1
Kaloyan Dinchev (BUL)	3	1
Daigoro Timoncini (ITA)	2	3	1
Heiki Nabi (EST)	7	0	1

Round of 16
Mitja Sedmak (SLO)	4	1
Jiang Huachen (CHN)	2	5^{F}
Andrei Batura (BLR)	3	5
Waldo Moreno (ESP)	0	0
Han Tae-young (KOR)	0	1	1
Justin Ruiz (USA)	3	1	1
Kaloyan Dinchev (BUL)	1	0	1
Heiki Nabi (EST)	1	4	2

Quarterfinals
Jiang Huachen (CHN)	0	1
Andrei Batura (BLR)	3	1
Han Tae-young (KOR)	2	1	1
Heiki Nabi (EST)	1	1	3

Semifinals
Andrei Batura (BLR)	0	3
Heiki Nabi (EST)	5	3

=== Bottom half ===
Round of 32
Lajos Virág (HUN)	8	6^{F}
Nguyễn Văn Dực (VIE)	0	0
Mindaugas Ežerskis (LTU)	0	0
Jimmy Lidberg (SWE)	4	5
Roman Meduna (SVK)	1	0
Mikhail Nikolayev (UKR)	2	4
Aslanbek Khushtov (RUS)	0	2	0
Ramaz Nozadze (GEO)	3	0	7
Elis Guri (ALB)	3	1
Theodoros Tounousidis (GRE)	4	2
Marek Švec (CZE)	6	3
Kenzo Kato (JPN)	0	1
Guillermo Talavera (VEN)	0	0
Margulan Assembekov (KAZ)	3	3
Karam Gaber (EGY)	1	1
Hamza Yerlikaya (TUR)	2	2

Round of 16
Lajos Virág (HUN)	0	1	1
Jimmy Lidberg (SWE)	3	1	1
Mikhail Nikolayev (UKR)	1	1
Ramaz Nozadze (GEO)	5	1
Theodoros Tounousidis (GRE)	1	1
Marek Švec (CZE)	3	2
Margulan Assembekov (KAZ)	0	0^{R}
Hamza Yerlikaya (TUR)	3	3

Quarterfinals
Jimmy Lidberg (SWE)	2	0
Ramaz Nozadze (GEO)	5	3
Marek Švec (CZE)	0	5^{F}
Hamza Yerlikaya (TUR)	4	0

Semifinals
Ramaz Nozadze (GEO)	1	4	1
Marek Švec (CZE)	2	0	1

=== Repechage ===
Repechage round 1
Daigoro Timoncini (ITA)	0	1
Kaloyan Dinchev (BUL)	5	1
Kenzo Kato (JPN)	5	0	2
Theodoros Tounousidis (GRE)	3	2	1

Repechage round 2
Kaloyan Dinchev (BUL)	0	2	4
Han Tae-young (KOR)	5	0	0
Kenzo Kato (JPN)	1	1
Hamza Yerlikaya (TUR)	3	2

Bronze medals
Kaloyan Dinchev (BUL)	1	1
Andrei Batura (BLR)	1	1
Hamza Yerlikaya (TUR)	6	2
Ramaz Nozadze (GEO)	0	0
