= Hamza Yerlikaya =

Turkish Graeco-Roman style wrestler

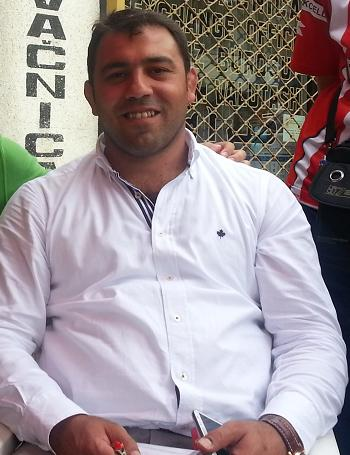

Personal information
- Nationality: Turkish
- Born: June 6, 1976 (age 50) Kadıköy, Istanbul, Turkey
- Height: 1.76 m (5 ft 9 in)
- Weight: 84 kg (185 lb)

Sport
- Sport: Sport wrestling
- Event: Greco-Roman wrestling
- Club: Istanbul BB SK
- Turned pro: 1992
- Retired: 2007
Medal record
Men's Greco-Roman Wrestling
Representing Turkey
Event	1st	2nd	3rd
Olympic Games	2	0	0
World Championship	3	1	1
European Championships	8	1	0
World Cup	3	1	0
Mediterranean Games	1	0	1
Other	5	2	2
Total	22	5	4
Olympic Games
Gold medal – first place	1996 Atlanta	82 kg
Gold medal – first place	2000 Sydney	85 kg
World Championships
Gold medal – first place	1993 Stockholm	82 kg
Gold medal – first place	1995 Prague	82 kg
Gold medal – first place	2005 Budapest	96 kg
Silver medal – second place	1997 Wroclaw	85 kg
Bronze medal – third place	2006 Guangzhou	96 kg
European Championships
Gold medal – first place	1996 Budapest	82 kg
Gold medal – first place	1997 Kouvola	85 kg
Gold medal – first place	1998 Minsk	85 kg
Gold medal – first place	1999 Sofia	85 kg
Gold medal – first place	2001 Istanbul	85 kg
Gold medal – first place	2002 Seinaejoki	84 kg
Gold medal – first place	2005 Varna	96 kg
Gold medal – first place	2006 Moscow	96 kg
Silver medal – second place	1993 Istanbul	82 kg
World Cup
Gold medal – first place	1997 Tehran	86 kg
Gold medal – first place	2006 Budapest	96 kg
Gold medal – first place	2007 Antalya	96 kg
Silver medal – second place	2002 Cairo	96 kg
Mediterranean Games
Gold medal – first place	1997 Bari	85 kg
Bronze medal – third place	1993 L-Roussillon	82 kg
Grand Prix of Germany
Gold medal – first place	2005 Dortmund	96 kg
Silver medal – second place	2002 Dortmund	96 kg
Bronze medal – third place	2004 Dortmund	96 kg
World Espoir Championships
Bronze medal – third place	1995 Tehran	82 kg
European Espoir Championships
Gold medal – first place	1994 Istanbul	82 kg
World Juniors Championships
Gold medal – first place	1994 Budapest	88 kg
Gold medal – first place	1993 Goetzis	81 kg
Silver medal – second place	1992 Cali	74 kg
World Cadets Championships
Gold medal – first place	1992 Istanbul	76 kg

Hamza Yerlikaya (born June 6, 1976, in Kadıköy, Istanbul) is a Turkish Graeco-Roman style wrestler. He is a two-time (in 1996 and 2000) Olympic champion, three-time World Champion (1993, 1995, and 2005), and the first Turkish wrestler to become European champion a record eight times, a feat that has since been matched by Rıza Kayaalp. He was ranked third in a list of all-time-best wrestlers by the International Federation of Associated Wrestling Styles (FILA) and was named the "Wrestler of the Century" in 1996.

A sports complex in Gaziosmanpaşa district of Istanbul is named after him.

== Early life ==
His family was originally from Sivas, but they moved to Istanbul three months prior to Hamza's birth. His father Mustafa Yerlikaya is also a wrestler but was no longer active by the time Hamza was born. He started wrestling aged 11 encouraged by his father and inspired by his elder brother Muttalip Yerlikaya who is also a wrestler with international success.

== International wrestling career ==
Hamza Yerlikaya's first international competition was in 1991 World Cadets Wrestling Championships in Quebec, Canada, in which he got the fourth place. His first senior international event was the 1993 European Wrestling Championships in Istanbul where he got the second place, losing to Thomas Zander in the finals. He surprised some of the spectators who thought this was a coincidence by winning the gold medal in 1993 World Wrestling Championships in Stockholm, Sweden at the age of 17, and hence becoming the youngest ever World Champion in wrestling.

As his age allowed, in some years he participated in seniors, juniors as well as cadets events. He won the World Championship again in 1995 and went on to win his first Olympic gold medal in Atlanta 1996 at the age of 20. Yerlikaya competed in every category in Greco-Roman wrestling championships both domestically and internationally thanks to his young age. He continued collecting medals, most of which were gold. Besides, he was officially working for the State Railways, which meant that he received a salary for his wrestling. Yerlikaya joined the army to fulfill his military duty in 1996, during which he attended the Atlanta Olympics in Georgia, U.S. and won the gold medal in the 82-kilogram weight category. This also meant another record since no other soldier has ever won a gold medal in a civil championship. He repeated his success four years later in Sydney 2000 and carried the flag for Turkey at the Sydney 2000 opening ceremony. Since then he has won three more World Championships (2002, 2003 and (at 96 kg) 2005). He has won the European Seniors Championship eight times (1996, 1997, 1998, 1999, 2001, 2002, 2005 and 2006).

He competed in 84 kg Men's Greco-Roman Wrestling for Turkey in 2004 Summer Olympic Games in Athens, Greece and placed 4th.

Hamza Yerlikaya married Ebru Küçük in 2010, and they have two children. Yerlikaya quit wrestling in 2007 due to severe neck fractures. In the same year, he was elected as a Member of Parliament from Sivas province for the Justice and Development Party. Yerlikaya worked as a consultant in the General Director's Office for Youth and Sports, and he was also a member of the Turkish International Olympic Committee (IOC). He managed the Turkish Wrestling Federation as chairman before resigning in 2015. He is now one of the head consultants of the Presidency of the Turkish Republic.

== Affiliations and coaching ==
- Between years 1986-1996 he was in Istanbul Demirspor club and was coached by Salih Bora and Muzaffer Aydın.
- He did his military service in 1996-1997 and is the only Turkish athlete that won a medal in Olympic Games during military service.
- He was coached by Salih Bora since 1997.
- In years 1998-1999 he was in Emlakbank club.
- Since 1999 he is wrestling for Istanbul Metropolitan Municipality.
- Hakki Basar started coaching him in 2004.

== Personal chronology ==
- 1986: Begins wrestling at age of eleven
- 1991: Places fourth in first international competition, World Cadets Wrestling Championships in Quebec, Canada
- 1993: Wins gold medal in World Wrestling Championships in Stockholm, Sweden, at age seventeen; breaks record for youngest champion ever
- 1996: Wins first Olympic gold medal in Atlanta Olympics
- 2000: Wins second Olympic gold medal in Sydney, Australia
- 1996–2006: Wins eight European championships
- 2007: Withdraws from international competition to undergo neck surgery

== Major international achievements ==
In reverse chronological order:

- 2006 European Championship in Moscow, Russia - gold (96 kg)
- 2006 World Cup in Budapest, Hungary - gold (96 kg)
- 2005 World Championship in Budapest, Hungary - gold (96 kg)
- 2005 European Championship in Varna, Bulgaria - gold (96 kg)
- 2004 Olympics in Athens, Greece - 4th (84 kg)
- 2003 World Championship in Créteil, Paris in France - 7th (84 kg)
- 2002 World Cup in Cairo, Egypt - silver (96 kg)
- 2002 World Championship in Moscow in Russia - 6th (84 kg)
- 2002 European Championship in Seinäjoki, Finland - gold (84 kg)
- 2001 World Championship in Patras in Greece - 9th (85 kg)
- 2001 World Cup in Levallois-Perret, Paris, France - 5th (97 kg)
- 2001 European Championship in Istanbul, Turkey - gold (85 kg)
- 2000 Olympics in Sydney, Australia - gold (85 kg)
- 1999 World Championship in Athens, Greece - 21st (85 kg)
- 1999 European Championship in Sofia, Bulgaria - gold (85 kg)
- 1998 World Championship in Gävle, Sweden - 5th (85 kg)
- 1998 European Championship in Minsk, Belarus - gold (85 kg)
- 1997 World Cup in Tehran, Iran - gold (85 kg)
- 1997 World Championship in Wrocław, Poland - silver (85 kg)
- 1997 Mediterranean Games in Bari, Italy - gold (85 kg)
- 1997 European Championship in Kouvola, Finland - gold (85 kg)
- 1996 Olympics in Atlanta, Georgia, U.S. - gold (82 kg)
- 1996 European Championship in Budapest, Hungary - gold (82 kg)
- 1995 World Championship in Prague, Czech Republic - gold (82 kg)
- 1995 World Espoir Championship in Tehran, Iran - bronze (82 kg)
- 1995 European Championship in Besançon, France - 7th (82 kg)
- 1994 World Championship in Tampere, Finland - 12th (82 kg)
- 1994 World Juniors Championship in Budapest, Hungary - gold (88 kg)
- 1994 European Espoir Championship in Istanbul, Turkey - gold (82 kg)
- 1994 European Championship in Athens, Greece - 5th (82 kg)
- 1993 World Championship in Stockholm, Sweden - gold (82 kg)
- 1993 European Juniors Championship in Götzis, Austria - gold (81 kg)
- 1993 European Championship in Istanbul, Turkey - silver (82 kg)
- 1993 Mediterranean Games in Languedoc-Roussillon, France - bronze (82 kg)
- 1992 World Cadets Championship in Istanbul, Turkey - gold (76 kg)
- 1992 World Juniors Championship in Santiago de Cali, Colombia - silver (74 kg)
- 1991 World Cadets Championship in Alma, Quebec, Canada - 4th (65 kg)

All listed events are Greco-Roman style wrestling.
