= Greg Woodcroft =

Canadian wrestler

Personal information
- Born: 27 August 1970 Hamilton, Ontario, Canada
- Died: 17 April 2015 (aged 44)

Sport
- Sport: Wrestling

Greg Woodcroft (27 August 1970 – 17 April 2015) was a Canadian wrestler. He competed in the men's freestyle 52 kg at the 1996 Summer Olympics.
