= Omar Kedjaouer =

Algerian wrestler

Personal information
- Nationality: Algerian
- Born: 22 July 1974 (age 52)

Sport
- Sport: Wrestling

Omar Kedjaouer (born 22 July 1974) is an Algerian wrestler. He competed in the men's freestyle 52 kg at the 1996 Summer Olympics.
