= 1998 European Wrestling Championships =

- Host city: Minsk, Belarus Greco-Roman; Bratislava, Slovakia Freestyle
- Dates: 7 – 10 May 1998; 23 – 25 April 1998

Champions
- Freestyle: Ukraine
- Greco-Roman: Russia
- Women: Russia

The 1998 European Wrestling Championships were held in the Greco-Romane style in Minsk 7 – 10 May 1998; the men's and the women's Freestyle style in Bratislava 23 – 25 April 1998.

== Medal table ==
Rank	Nation	Gold	Silver	Bronze	Total
1	Russia	7	4	4	15
2	Turkey	4	0	2	6
3	Germany	2	2	1	5
4	Bulgaria	2	1	1	4
5	Georgia	2	1	0	3
6	Ukraine	1	4	3	8
7	Belarus	1	3	1	5
8	Poland	1	1	1	3
9	France	1	0	2	3
10	Austria	1	0	0	1
11	Sweden	0	2	1	3
12	Norway	0	1	1	2
12	Slovakia	0	1	1	2
14	Armenia	0	1	0	1
14	Azerbaijan	0	1	0	1
16	Greece	0	0	2	2
17	Italy	0	0	1	1
17	Romania	0	0	1	1
Totals (18 entries)		22	22	22	66

== Medal summary ==
=== Men's freestyle ===
Event	Gold	Silver	Bronze
54 kg	Oleksandr Zakharuk; Ukraine	Herman Kantoyeu; Belarus	Amiran Kardanov; Greece
58 kg	David Pogosian; Georgia	Murad Umakhanov; Russia	Yevhen Buslovych; Ukraine
63 kg	Serafim Barzakov; Bulgaria	Sergey Smal; Belarus	Elbrus Tedeyev; Ukraine
69 kg	Yüksel Şanlı; Turkey	Zaza Zazirov; Ukraine	Velijan Alajverdiyev; Russia
76 kg	Alexander Leipold; Germany	Arayik Gevorgyan; Armenia	Adam Saitiev; Russia
85 kg	Buvaisar Saitiev; Russia	Davyd Bichinashvili; Ukraine	Jozef Lohyňa; Slovakia
97 kg	Eldar Kurtanidze; Georgia	Marek Garmulewicz; Poland	Aftantil Xanthopoulos; Greece
130 kg	Aydın Polatçı; Turkey	Milan Mazáč; Slovakia	David Musulbes; Russia

=== Men's Greco-Roman ===
Event	Gold	Silver	Bronze
54 kg	Boris Ambartsumov; Russia	Natig Eyvazov; Azerbaijan	Marian Sandu; Romania
58 kg	Armen Nazaryan; Bulgaria	Rafik Simonian; Russia	Igor Petrenko; Belarus
63 kg	Şeref Eroğlu; Turkey	Nikolai Monov; Russia	Oleh Lytvynenko; Ukraine
69 kg	Aleksandr Tretyakov; Russia	Vladimir Kopytov; Belarus	Adam Juretzko; Germany
76 kg	Murat Kardanov; Russia	Xviça Biçinaşvili; Georgia	Nazmi Avluca; Turkey
85 kg	Hamza Yerlikaya; Turkey	Sergey Tsvir; Russia	Martin Lidberg; Sweden
97 kg	Sergey Lishtvan; Belarus	Mikael Ljungberg; Sweden	Hakkı Başar; Turkey
130 kg	Aleksandr Karelin; Russia	Georgiy Saldadze; Ukraine	Sergei Mureiko; Bulgaria

=== Women's freestyle ===
Event	Gold	Silver	Bronze
46 kg	Inga Karamchakova; Russia	Mette Barlie; Norway	Farah Touchi; France
51 kg	Yelena Yegoshina; Russia	Tanja Sauter; Germany	Angélique Berthenet; France
56 kg	Anna Gomis; France	Sara Eriksson; Sweden	Diletta Giampiccolo; Italy
62 kg	Nikola Hartmann; Austria	Stéphanie Groß; Germany	Lene Aanes; Norway
68 kg	Ewelina Pruszko; Poland	Galina Ivanova; Bulgaria	Elmira Kurbanova; Russia
75 kg	Nina Englich; Germany	Tetyana Komarnytska; Ukraine	Monika Kowalska; Poland
