= 2000 European Wrestling Championships =

- Host city: Moscow, Russia Greco-Roman; Budapest, Hungary Freestyle
- Dates: 13 – 18 April 2000; 9 - 10 April 2000

Champions
- Freestyle: Russia
- Greco-Roman: Russia
- Women: Russia

The 2000 European Wrestling Championships were held in the Greco-Romane in Moscow and the men's Freestyle style, and the women's freestyle in Budapest.

== Medal table ==
Rank	Nation	Gold	Silver	Bronze	Total
1	Russia	10	5	4	19
2	Belarus	2	4	1	7
3	Ukraine	2	1	3	6
4	Sweden	2	1	0	3
5	Hungary	1	1	2	4
6	France	1	1	1	3
7	Poland	1	1	0	2
8	Georgia	1	0	1	2
9	Austria	1	0	0	1
9	Romania	1	0	0	1
11	Bulgaria	0	2	4	6
12	Germany	0	2	3	5
13	Turkey	0	2	2	4
14	Norway	0	1	0	1
14	Switzerland	0	1	0	1
16	Armenia	0	0	1	1
Totals (16 entries)		22	22	22	66

== Medal summary ==
=== Men's freestyle ===
Event	Gold	Silver	Bronze
54 kg	Oleksandr Zakharuk; Ukraine	Leonid Chuchunov; Russia	Ivan Djorev; Bulgaria
58 kg	Murad Ramazanov; Russia	Arif Kama; Turkey	Yevhen Buslovych; Ukraine
63 kg	Murad Umakhanov; Russia	Sergey Smal; Belarus	Serafim Barzakov; Bulgaria
69 kg	Emzarios Bentinidis; Georgia	Sergey Demchenko; Belarus	Nikolay Paslar; Bulgaria
76 kg	Buvaisar Saitiev; Russia	Adem Bereket; Turkey	Guram Mchedlidze; Georgia
85 kg	Adam Saitiev; Russia	Beibulat Musaev; Belarus	Gábor Kapuvári; Hungary
97 kg	Sagid Murtazaliev; Russia	Arawat Sabejew; Germany	Vadim Tasoyev; Ukraine
130 kg	Marek Garmulewicz; Poland	David Musulbes; Russia	Sven Thiele; Germany

=== Men's Greco-Roman ===
Event	Gold	Silver	Bronze
54 kg	Marian Sandu; Romania	Boris Ambartsumov; Russia	Alfred Ter-Mkrtchyan; Germany
58 kg	István Majoros; Hungary	Armen Nazaryan; Bulgaria	Rıfat Yıldız; Germany
63 kg	Varteres Samurgashev; Russia	Beat Motzer; Switzerland	Vitaly Zhuk; Belarus
69 kg	Aleksey Glushkov; Russia	Csaba Hirbik; Hungary	Movses Karapetyan; Armenia
76 kg	Viachaslau Makaranka; Belarus	David Manukyan; Ukraine	Murat Kardanov; Russia
85 kg	Martin Lidberg; Sweden	Andrey Batura; Belarus	Aleksandr Menshchikov; Russia
97 kg	Sergey Lishtvan; Belarus	Gogi Koguashvili; Russia	Mehmet Özal; Turkey
130 kg	Aleksandr Karelin; Russia	Sergei Mureiko; Bulgaria	Mihály Deák-Bárdos; Hungary

=== Women's freestyle ===
Event	Gold	Silver	Bronze
46 kg	Lidiya Karamchakova; Russia	Farah Touchi; France	Kamelia Tsekova; Bulgaria
51 kg	Olga Smirnova; Russia	Ida Hellström; Sweden	Inesa Rebar; Ukraine
56 kg	Sara Eriksson; Sweden	Natalia Ivashko; Russia	Anna Gomis; France
62 kg	Nikola Hartmann; Austria	Gudrun Høie; Norway	Natalia Ivanova; Russia
68 kg	Lise Legrand; France	Anita Schätzle; Germany	Anna Shamova; Russia
75 kg	Tetyana Komarnytska; Ukraine	Edyta Witkowska; Poland	Zarife Yıldırım; Turkey
