= Moon Myung-seok =

South Korean wrestler (born 1972)

Personal information
- Nationality: South Korean
- Born: 20 May 1972 (age 54)

Sport
- Sport: Wrestling

Moon Myung-seok (born 20 May 1972) is a South Korean wrestler. He competed in the men's freestyle 54 kg at the 2000 Summer Olympics.
