= Herman Kantoyeu =

Belarusian freestyle wrestler

Personal information
- Full name: Herman Stsepanovich Kantoyeu
- Nationality: Belarus
- Born: 27 November 1971 (age 54) Khabarovsk, Russian SFSR
- Height: 1.65 m (5 ft 5 in)
- Weight: 62 kg (137 lb)

Sport
- Country: Russia; Belarus (since 1995)
- Style: Freestyle
- Club: Belarusian National Team
- Coach: Valentin Murzinkov
Medal record
Men's freestyle wrestling
Representing Belarus
World Championships
| Gold medal – first place | 2001 Sofia | 54 kg |
European Championships
| Silver medal – second place | 1998 Bratislava | 54 kg |
World University Championship
| Silver medal – second place | 1996 Tehran | 52kg |
Representing Russia
World Cup
| Silver medal – second place | 1993 Chattanooga | 52 kg |
Russian Championships
| Bronze medal – third place | 1993 Moscow | 52 kg |
| Silver medal – second place | 1992 Moscow | 52 kg |

Herman Stsepanovich Kantoyeu (Belarusian: Герман Сцяпанавіч Кантоеў; born November 27, 1971) is a retired amateur Belarusian freestyle wrestler, who competed in the men's featherweight category. Considered as one of the world's top freestyle wrestlers in his decade, Kantoyeu became a freestyle wrestling champion in the 54-kg division at the 2001 World Wrestling Championships, and later represented his nation Belarus in two editions of the Olympic Games (2000 and 2004).

Kantoyeu made his official debut at the 2000 Summer Olympics in Sydney, where he competed in the men's bantamweight category (54 kg). He pinned Cuba's Wilfredo García on his opening bout, but could not beat Kyrgyzstan's Nurbin Donbaev with a score 2–5 in the prelim pool. Despite a single loss, Kantoyeu still managed to secure a spot for the quarterfinals because of the most points collected from the elimination round. Followed by the next morning's session, Kantoyeu delivered a striking effort to edge Kazakhstan's Maulen Mamyrov off the mat in his next match, before falling behind U.S. wrestler and 1998 world champion Sammie Henson in the semifinals without scoring a single point. He faced against Greece's Amiran Kardanov in the bronze medal match, but nearly missed out the podium by single point behind his opponent with a score 4–5, finishing only in fourth place.

Determined to return again to the wrestling scene, Kantoyeu greatly emerged as a top medal contender at the 2001 World Wrestling Championships in Sofia, Bulgaria, where he beat Iran's Babak Nourzad to take home the gold medal in the men's bantamweight category. In 2002, Kantoyeu took a year off from the tournament because of sustained injuries, but sought his official return at the 2003 World Wrestling Championships in New York City, New York, United States, where he reaped an astonishing defeat from Japan's Chikara Tanabe in his opening match.

At the 2004 Summer Olympics in Athens, Kantoyeu qualified for his second Belarusian squad, as a 33-year-old, in the men's featherweight class (55 kg) by receiving a berth and placing second behind Cuba's René Montero from the Olympic Qualification Tournament in Novi Sad, Serbia and Montenegro. He lost his opening bout to Ukrainian wrestler and 2003 world bronze medalist Oleksandr Zakharuk, but scored a single triumph to subdue Kazakhstan's Baurzhan Orazgaliyev in the prelim pool. Finishing second in the elimination round and fifteenth overall, Kantoyeu could not deliver a remarkable attempt from Sydney to put him further into the quarterfinals.
