= 1997 European Wrestling Championships =

- Host city: Kouvola, Finland Greco-Roman; Warsaw, Poland Freestyle
- Dates: 22 – 25 May 1997; 1 – 6 May 1997

Champions
- Freestyle: Russia
- Greco-Roman: Turkey
- Women: France

The 1997 European Wrestling Championships were held in the Greco-Romane style in Kouvola 22 – 25 May 1997; the men's and the women's Freestyle style in Warsaw 1 – 6 May 1997.

== Medal table ==
Rank	Nation	Gold	Silver	Bronze	Total
1	Russia	7	1	5	13
2	Poland	3	2	0	5
3	Turkey	2	2	3	7
4	France	2	1	3	6
5	Georgia	2	1	1	4
6	Armenia	2	0	0	2
7	Ukraine	1	2	3	6
8	Austria	1	0	1	2
8	Bulgaria	1	0	1	2
8	Sweden	1	0	1	2
11	Germany	0	4	2	6
12	Belarus	0	3	0	3
13	Finland	0	2	0	2
13	Norway	0	2	0	2
15	Azerbaijan	0	1	0	1
15	Romania	0	1	0	1
17	Greece	0	0	1	1
17	Yugoslavia	0	0	1	1
Totals (18 entries)		22	22	22	66

== Medal summary ==
=== Men's freestyle ===
Event	Gold	Silver	Bronze
54 kg	Oleksandr Zakharuk; Ukraine	Namig Abdullayev; Azerbaijan	Mevlana Kulaç; Turkey
58 kg	David Pogosian; Georgia	Tadeusz Kowalski; Poland	Murad Umakhanov; Russia
63 kg	Magomed Azizov; Russia	Elbrus Tedeyev; Ukraine	Serafim Barzakov; Bulgaria
69 kg	Arayik Gevorgyan; Armenia	Yüksel Şanlı; Turkey	Zaza Zazirov; Ukraine
76 kg	Buvaisar Saitiev; Russia	Alexander Leipold; Germany	Kamil Kocaoğlu; Turkey
85 kg	Khadzhimurad Magomedov; Russia	Nicolae Ghiță; Romania	Davyd Bichinashvili; Ukraine
97 kg	Eldar Kurtanidze; Georgia	Marek Garmulewicz; Poland	Arawat Sabejew; Germany
125 kg	David Musulbes; Russia	Aleksey Medvedev; Belarus	Sven Thiele; Germany

=== Men's Greco-Roman ===
Event	Gold	Silver	Bronze
54 kg	Dariusz Jabłoński; Poland	Farjat Magueramov; Belarus	Oleg Nemchenko; Russia
58 kg	Karen Mnatsakanyan; Armenia	Djamel Ainaoui; France	Ergüder Bekişdamat; Turkey
63 kg	Nikolai Monov; Russia	Şeref Eroğlu; Turkey	Akaki Chachua; Georgia
69 kg	Aleksandr Tretyakov; Russia	Guiorgui Dzhindzhelashvili; Georgia	Rustam Adzhi; Ukraine
76 kg	Torbjörn Kornbakk; Sweden	Marko Asell; Finland	Yvon Riemer; France
85 kg	Hamza Yerlikaya; Turkey	Thomas Zander; Germany	Aleksandar Jovančević; Yugoslavia
97 kg	Hakkı Başar; Turkey	Anatoli Fedorenko; Belarus	Konstantinos Thanos; Greece
125 kg	Sergei Mureiko; Bulgaria	Juha Ahokas; Finland	Alexandr Bezruchkin; Russia

=== Women's freestyle ===
Event	Gold	Silver	Bronze
46 kg	Farah Touchi; France	Mette Barlie; Norway	Lidiya Karamchakova; Russia
51 kg	Yelena Yegoshina; Russia	Tanja Sauter; Germany	Angélique Berthenet; France
56 kg	Anna Gomis; France	Lene Aanes; Norway	Sara Eriksson; Sweden
62 kg	Nikola Hartmann; Austria	Natalia Vinogradova; Russia	Lise Legrand; France
68 kg	Anna Udycz; Poland	Nina Englich; Germany	Nina Strasser; Austria
75 kg	Monika Kowalska; Poland	Tetiana Komarnytska; Ukraine	Anna Shamova; Russia
