= 2006 European Wrestling Championships =

Wrestling Championship Held In Russia

- Host city: Moscow, Russia
- Dates: 25 – 30 April 2006

Champions
- Freestyle: Russia
- Greco-Roman: Turkey
- Women: Russia

The 2006 European Wrestling Championships was held from 25 April to 30 April 2006 in Moscow, Russia.

== Medal table ==
Rank	Nation	Gold	Silver	Bronze	Total
1	Russia	12	1	4	17
2	Armenia	2	3	2	7
3	Turkey	2	2	3	7
4	Ukraine	1	3	5	9
5	Bulgaria	1	1	2	4
5	Poland	1	1	2	4
7	France	1	0	4	5
8	Hungary	1	0	2	3
9	Germany	0	2	2	4
10	Belarus	0	2	1	3
11	Georgia	0	1	3	4
12	Azerbaijan	0	1	2	3
12	Greece	0	1	2	3
14	Finland	0	1	0	1
14	Latvia	0	1	0	1
14	Moldova	0	1	0	1
17	Romania	0	0	3	3
18	Sweden	0	0	2	2
19	Austria	0	0	1	1
19	Czech Republic	0	0	1	1
19	Italy	0	0	1	1
Totals (21 entries)		21	21	42	84

== Medal summary ==
=== Men's freestyle ===
Event	Gold	Silver	Bronze
55 kg	Oleksandr Zakharuk; Ukraine	Namig Abdullayev; Azerbaijan	Amiran Kardanov; Greece
55 kg	Oleksandr Zakharuk; Ukraine	Namig Abdullayev; Azerbaijan	Dzhamal Otarsultanov; Russia
60 kg	Mavlet Batirov; Russia	Tevfik Odabaşı; Turkey	Anatolie Guidea; Bulgaria
60 kg	Mavlet Batirov; Russia	Tevfik Odabaşı; Turkey	Evgeni Khavilov; Ukraine
66 kg	Makhach Murtazaliev; Russia	Albert Batyrov; Belarus	Serafim Barzakov; Bulgaria
66 kg	Makhach Murtazaliev; Russia	Albert Batyrov; Belarus	Vadim Guigolaev; France
74 kg	Buvaisar Saitiev; Russia	Ruslan Kokaev; Armenia	Gábor Hatos; Hungary
74 kg	Buvaisar Saitiev; Russia	Ruslan Kokaev; Armenia	Krystian Brzozowski; Poland
84 kg	Adam Saitiev; Russia	Gökhan Yavaşer; Turkey	Vadim Laliev; Armenia
84 kg	Adam Saitiev; Russia	Gökhan Yavaşer; Turkey	Taras Danko; Ukraine
96 kg	Khadzhimurat Gatsalov; Russia	Shamil Gitinov; Armenia	Giorgi Gogshelidze; Georgia
96 kg	Khadzhimurat Gatsalov; Russia	Shamil Gitinov; Armenia	Stefan Kehrer; Germany
120 kg	Kuramagomed Kuramagomedov; Russia	Ivan Ishchenko; Ukraine	Eldar Kurtanidze; Georgia
120 kg	Kuramagomed Kuramagomedov; Russia	Ivan Ishchenko; Ukraine	Rareș Chintoan; Romania

=== Men's Greco-Roman ===
Event	Gold	Silver	Bronze
55 kg	Roman Amoyan; Armenia	Venelin Venkov; Bulgaria	Rovshan Bayramov; Azerbaijan
55 kg	Roman Amoyan; Armenia	Venelin Venkov; Bulgaria	Claudiu Gavrila; Romania
60 kg	Karen Mnatsakanyan; Armenia	David Bedinadze; Georgia	Fuad Aliyev; Azerbaijan
60 kg	Karen Mnatsakanyan; Armenia	David Bedinadze; Georgia	Vyacheslav Djaste; Russia
66 kg	Tamás Lőrincz; Hungary	Sergey Kovalenko; Russia	Şeref Eroğlu; Turkey
66 kg	Tamás Lőrincz; Hungary	Sergey Kovalenko; Russia	Oleksandr Khvoshch; Ukraine
74 kg	Varteres Samurgashev; Russia	Aleh Mikhalovich; Belarus	Manuchar Kvirkvelia; Georgia
74 kg	Varteres Samurgashev; Russia	Aleh Mikhalovich; Belarus	Mahmut Altay; Turkey
84 kg	Artur Michalkiewicz; Poland	Denis Forov; Armenia	Mélonin Noumonvi; France
84 kg	Artur Michalkiewicz; Poland	Denis Forov; Armenia	Nazmi Avluca; Turkey
96 kg	Hamza Yerlikaya; Turkey	Mikhail Nikolaev; Ukraine	Marek Švec; Czech Republic
96 kg	Hamza Yerlikaya; Turkey	Mikhail Nikolaev; Ukraine	Jimmy Lidberg; Sweden
120 kg	İsmail Güzel; Turkey	Juha Ahokas; Finland	Khasan Baroev; Russia
120 kg	İsmail Güzel; Turkey	Juha Ahokas; Finland	Oleksandr Chernetskyi; Ukraine

=== Women's freestyle ===
Event	Gold	Silver	Bronze
48 kg *	Lilia Kaskarakova; Russia	Fani Psatha; Greece	Francine De Paola; Italy
48 kg *	Lilia Kaskarakova; Russia	Fani Psatha; Greece	Cristina Croitoru; Romania
51 kg	Vanessa Boubryemm; France	Alexandra Engelhardt; Germany	Natalia Smirnova; Russia
51 kg	Vanessa Boubryemm; France	Alexandra Engelhardt; Germany	Oleksandra Kohut; Ukraine
55 kg	Natalia Golts; Russia	Ludmila Cristea; Moldova	Anna Gomis; France
55 kg	Natalia Golts; Russia	Ludmila Cristea; Moldova	Johanna Mattsson; Sweden
59 kg	Lubov Volosova; Russia	Stefanie Stüber; Germany	Audrey Prieto; France
59 kg	Lubov Volosova; Russia	Stefanie Stüber; Germany	Marianna Sastin; Hungary
63 kg	Alena Kartashova; Russia	Monika Michalik; Poland	Nikola Hartmann-Dünser; Austria
63 kg	Alena Kartashova; Russia	Monika Michalik; Poland	Agoro Papavasileiou; Greece
67 kg	Elena Perepelkina; Russia	Kristine Odrina Orbova; Latvia	Agnieszka Wieszczek-Kordus; Poland
67 kg	Elena Perepelkina; Russia	Kristine Odrina Orbova; Latvia	Iryna Shautsova; Belarus
72 kg	Stanka Zlateva; Bulgaria	Svetlana Saenko; Ukraine	Anita Schätzle; Germany
72 kg	Stanka Zlateva; Bulgaria	Svetlana Saenko; Ukraine	Karine Shadoyan; Armenia

* In women 48 kg the Ukrainian Mariya Stadnik won gold medal, but later she was disqualified because she use Furosemide.
