= Martin Liddle =

New Zealand wrestler

Personal information
- Nationality: New Zealand
- Born: 19 June 1978 (age 48) Papakura, Auckland, New Zealand

Sport
- Sport: Wrestling

Martin Liddle (born 19 June 1978) is a New Zealand wrestler. He competed in the men's freestyle 54 kg at the 2000 Summer Olympics.
