= Hideo Sasayama =

Japanese wrestler (born 1966)

Personal information
- Nationality: Japanese
- Born: 9 January 1966 (age 60) Aomori, Japan

Sport
- Sport: Wrestling

Hideo Sasayama (笹山 秀雄, Sasayama Hideo; born 9 January 1966) is a Japanese wrestler. He competed in the men's freestyle 52 kg at the 1996 Summer Olympics.
