= Behnam Tayyebi =

Iranian freestyle wrestler

Personal information
- Born: 18 August 1976 (age 49)

Sport
- Country: Iran
- Sport: Wrestling
Medal record
Men's freestyle wrestling
Representing Iran
Asian Games
Silver medal – second place	1998 Bangkok	54 kg
Asian Championships
Gold medal – first place	2001 Ulaanbaatar	58 kg
Bronze medal – third place	1996 Xiaoshan	52 kg

Behnam Tayyebi Kermani (Persian: بهنام طیبی کرمانی; born 23 July 1975 in Qaem Shahr) is a retired Iranian wrestler. He competed at the 2000 Summer Olympics in Sydney, in the men's freestyle 54 kg.
