= Kim Woo-yong =

South Korean freestyle wrestler

Medal record

Men's freestyle wrestling

Representing South Korea

World Championships
Gold medal – first place	1999 Ankara	54 kg

Kim Woo-Yong (Korean: 김우용; born 1971 in Pyeongchang, Gangwon Province) is a retired South Korean freestyle wrestler.

Kim won the gold medal in the men's freestyle 54 kg class at the 1999 World Championships held in Ankara, Turkey. However, his later career was hampered by a shoulder fracture he had during the 2000 Olympic trials, forcing him into retirement in 2001.

Kim participated in the 2006 Asian Games as an assistant coach of the South Korean women's national wrestling team, and currently serves as the coach of the Pyeongchang County Government Wrestling Team.
