= Kenzō Katō =

Japanese Greco-Roman wrestler

Personal information
- Nationality: Japan
- Born: 26 September 1980 (age 45) Aichi Prefecture, Japan
- Height: 1.83 m (6 ft 0 in)
- Weight: 96 kg (212 lb)

Sport
- Sport: Wrestling
- Event: Greco-Roman
- Club: Japan Self Defense Forces
- Coached by: Atsuji Miyahara

Kenzō Katō (加藤 賢三, Katō Kenzō; born September 26, 1980 in Aichi Prefecture) is an amateur Japanese Greco-Roman wrestler, who played for the men's heavyweight category. Katō represented Japan at the 2008 Summer Olympics, where he competed for the men's 96 kg class. He lost the qualifying round match to Italy's Daigoro Timoncini, who was able to score eight points in two straight periods, leaving Kato without a single point.
