= Víctor Rodríguez (wrestler) =

Mexican wrestler (born 1974)

Víctor Rodríguez (born 22 December 1974) is a Mexican former wrestler who competed in the 1996 Summer Olympics.
