= Constantin Corduneanu (wrestler) =

Romanian freestyle wrestler (1969–2024)

Constantin Corduneanu (23 April 1969, Iași – 15 April 2024, Târgu Mureș) was a Romanian freestyle wrestler who competed in the 1992 Summer Olympics and in the 1996 Summer Olympics.

== Biography ==
Born into a poor family with eleven children, Corduneanu started wrestling at the Nicolina Sports Club in his hometown, Iași.

During his active wrestling career he was a member of Steaua Bucharest and Dinamo Brașov, where he was a non-commissioned officer.

Corduneanu retired from wrestling in 2002, but before that he had become the leader of a Mafia-type criminal organization in Iași. In 2013, he was indicted along with Dragos Cosmin Gradinariu, alias Bombardieru for the "establishment of an organized criminal group, leading and financing illegal drug activities, but was found not guilty by Romania's Supreme Court in 2013.

When he married his second wife, Alina Bogdan, he changed his family name into Bogdan, but reverted to the old family name after they divorced.

In 2015, he had a song dedicated to him and his brother, Adrian Corduneanu (also known as Beleaua), named Mafia. The artist who sings it is Dani Mocanu, well known manele singer.

Corduneanu died on 15 April 2024, at the age of 54.
