= Oleksandr Zakharuk =

Ukrainian wrestler (born 1976)

Personal information
- Full name: Oleksandr Valeriyovych; Zakharuk
- Nationality: Ukraine
- Born: 25 August 1976 (age 49) Kiev, Ukrainian SSR, Soviet Union
- Height: 1.61 m (5 ft 3 1/2 in)
- Weight: 55 kg (121 lb)

Sport
- Style: Freestyle
- Club: Ukraina Kyiv
- Coach: Serhiy Obesnyuk
Medal record
Men's freestyle wrestling
Representing Ukraine
World Championships
Bronze medal – third place	1999 Ankara	54 kg
Bronze medal – third place	2002 Tehran	55 kg
Bronze medal – third place	2003 New York	55 kg
European Championships
Gold medal – first place	1997 Warsaw	54 kg
Gold medal – first place	1998 Bratislava	54 kg
Gold medal – first place	1999 Minsk	54 kg
Gold medal – first place	2000 Budapest	54 kg
Gold medal – first place	2006 Moscow	55 kg

Oleksandr Valeriyovych Zakharuk (Ukrainian: Олександр Валерійович Захарук; born August 25, 1976, in Kiev) is a retired amateur Ukrainian freestyle wrestler, who competed in the men's featherweight category. Considered one of the world's top freestyle wrestlers in his decade, Zakharuk had claimed five European championship titles, picked up three bronze medals at the World Championships (1999, 2002, and 2003), and achieved top eight finishes in two editions of the Olympic Games (2000 and 2004). Throughout his sporting career, Zakharuk trained as a member of the freestyle wrestling team for Ukraina Kyiv Sport Club, under his coach Serhiy Obesnyuk.

Zakharuk entered the 2000 Summer Olympics in Sydney, as a top medal contender, in the men's bantamweight category (54 kg), after claiming a bronze from the 1999 World Wrestling Championships in Ankara, Turkey. During the preliminary pool, Zakharuk pinned neighboring Russia's Leonid Chuchunov on his opening bout, and then eclipsed Bulgaria's Ivan Tsonov with a powerful effort and a 10-point advantage to earn him a spot for the quarterfinals. Followed by the next morning's session, Zakharuk fell behind U.S. wrestler and 1998 world champion Sammie Henson with a score 4–8, before he sought a chance to fight back in a consolation battle against Kazakhstan's Maulen Mamyrov for a fifth-place finish.

At the 2004 Summer Olympics in Athens, Zakharuk qualified for his second Ukrainian squad, as a 28-year-old, in the men's featherweight class (55 kg) with another brilliant sporting record. After the abolition of the bantamweight division in amateur wrestling that propelled him to fight at least a single kilogram heavier than in 2000, Zakharuk picked up his third career bronze medal in the men's featherweight category at the 2003 World Wrestling Championships in New York City, New York, United States, which earned him a spot on the Ukrainian Olympic team. He continued to deliver a more stellar performance from Sydney four years earlier by pinning Kazakhstan's Baurzhan Orazgaliyev and overpowering Belarusian wrestler and 2001 world champion Herman Kantoyeu to seize another shot of an Olympic medal. Fighting against Russia's Mavlet Batirov in the quarterfinal match, Zakharuk could not score a single point to push him off the mat, and instead, managed to finish only in seventh at the end of the tournament.
