= Chechenol Mongush =

Russian wrestler

Chechen-Ool Mongush (28 May 1972, Khayelrakan, Tuva - died c. 9 June 2013) was a Russian former wrestler who competed in the 1996 Summer Olympics. He was strangled to death in June 2013 by a man who confessed to the athlete's killing.
