= Sammie Henson =

American wrestler (born 1971)

Personal information
- Full name: Samuel Henson
- Born: January 1, 1971 (age 55) St. Louis, Missouri, U.S.

Sport
- Country: United States
- Sport: Wrestling
- Events: Freestyle and Folkstyle
- College team: Clemson Tigers
- Club: Sunkist Kids Wrestling Club
- Team: USA
Medal record
Men's freestyle wrestling
Representing the United States
Olympic Games
Silver medal – second place	2000 Sydney	54 kg
World Championships
Gold medal – first place	1998 Tehran	54 kg
Bronze medal – third place	2006 Guangzhou	55 kg
Collegiate Wrestling
Representing the Clemson Tigers
NCAA Division I Championships
Gold medal – first place	1993 Ames	118 lb
Gold medal – first place	1994 Chapel Hill	118 lb
ACC Championships
Gold medal – first place	1993 Durham	118 llb
Gold medal – first place	1994 Charlottesville	118 lb
Representing the Missouri Tigers
Big 8 Championships
Gold medal – first place	1991 Columbia	118 lb

Samuel "Sammie" Henson (born January 1, 1971) is a 5’8 World Champion wrestler, winning a gold medal in freestyle for the USA at the 1998 FILA Wrestling World Championships, held in Tehran, Iran. He was also a silver medallist at the 2000 Summer Olympics in the freestyle 54 kg category, losing to Abdullayev in the finals of that event, held in Sydney, New South Wales, Australia. At the age of 36, he competed at the 2006 FILA Wrestling World Championships held in Guangzhou, China, earning a bronze medal. He was named USA Wrestling's Man of the Year in 1998.

He is formerly the head coach at West Virginia University. He was also head coach of the Sunkist Kids Wrestling Club. Henson was born in St. Louis, Missouri. In 2015, Henson was inducted into the National Wrestling Hall of Fame as a Distinguished Member.

== High school career ==
Henson attended Francis Howell High School in St. Charles, Missouri. In high school, he was coached by Roger Hodapp (1986–1987), and Judd Hofmann (1988–1989). Henson and his brothers Chuck and Kevin, helped lead the Francis Howell Vikings to four Missouri Team State Championships in the 1980s. Henson was a member of the 1986 and 1987 State Championship teams. Individually, he placed fourth in state as a freshman, followed by being a three-time Missouri Class 4A State Champion. In 1989, he was named Missouri Class 4A High School Wrestler of the Year, and was a First-Team Asics High School All-American.

== College career ==
Henson began his college wrestling career at the University of Missouri, in Columbia, Missouri. He was coached at MU by Wes Roper. He chose Missouri because it was close to home, and because he wanted to prove that he could win for his in-state school. He proved the point by becoming a Big 8 champion, and an All-American in his freshman year, winning fifth place at the 1991 NCAA Wrestling Championships. He achieved this despite being the seventh seed in the tournament. Ironically, to win fifth place, he defeated second seeded Donnie Heckel, of Clemson University, (the school where he would eventually finish his college career) by a score of 13-2.

After his freshman year, Henson transferred to Clemson to wrestle under Coach Gil Sanchez. He ended his college career as the most successful wrestler in Clemson history, going 71-0 over his last two seasons. He won back to back NCAA titles at 118 pounds in 1993 and 1994. In 1994, he was also named ACC Wrestler of the Year. He then returned to the University of Missouri to finish his degree, graduating in 1995 with a degree in Park, Recreation and Tourism Management. He was inducted into Clemson's Hall of Fame in 2000. Henson was one of Clemson's last wrestlers (the program was discontinued in 1995 due to Title IX) and named one of ACC's Top 100 athletes in a conference more known for basketball.

== International career ==
=== US Open ===
Although primarily known for his freestyle wrestling, Henson also has Greco-Roman wrestling experience. He won a gold medal in Greco-Roman at the 1990 US Open, and placed 4th in the event at the 1998 Open. In freestyle at the US Open, Henson placed 4th in 1995, won silver medals in 1997 and 2004, and won the gold in 1998, 2000, and 2005.

=== Olympic Trials ===
Henson was an Olympic qualifier in 1988, won silver at the Olympic Trials in 1992 and 2004, and won the gold in the 2000 Olympic Trials held in Dallas, Texas. He would go on to win the Silver in Sydney.

=== International Events ===
EVENT	YEAR	LOCATION	MEDAL
Olympic Games	2000	Sydney, Australia	Silver
World Championship	1998	Tehran, Iran	Gold
World Championship	2006	Guanzgoua, China	Bronze
World Cup	1997	Stillwater, Oklahoma	Silver
World Cup	1999	Spokane, Washington	Silver
Goodwill Games	1998	New York, New York	Silver
Yarigan International	2000	Siberia, Russia	Gold
Yarigan International	2005	Siberia, Russia	Bronze
Cerro Pelado International	2000	St. Spiritus, Cuba	Silver
Cerro Pelado International	2003	St. Spiritus, Cuba	Gold
Cerro Pelado International	2005	St. Spiritus, Cuba	Gold
Medved International	2005	Minsk, Russia	Gold
Clansmen International	2001	British Columbia, Canada	Gold
Clansmen International	2003	British Columbia, Canada	Gold
Dave Schultz International	2003	Colorado Springs, Colorado	Gold
Yasar Dogu International	1997	Ankara, Turkey	Gold
Yasar Dogu International	1998	Ankara, Turkey	Gold
Yasar Dogu International	2001	Ankara, Turkey	Gold
Yasar Dogu International	2005	Ankara, Turkey	Silver
Poland International	2001	Warsaw, Poland	Gold
Kyiv Grand Prix International	1998	Kyiv, Ukraine	Bronze
Uzbekistan Cup	1997	Tashkent, Uzbekistan	Silver
Henri Delglane Challenge International	1996	Nice, France	Bronze
New York Athletic Club International	2000	New York, New York	Gold

== Coaching career ==
Henson has worked at the University of Oklahoma, Penn State University, West Point, Cal Poly San Luis Obispo and the University of Nebraska–Lincoln as an assistant coach. Henson helped coach Michael Lightner and Byron Tucker to NCAA titles at Oklahoma, and helped coach Nebraska's Paul Donahoe to an NCAA crown in 2007. In just two years at Penn State, Henson helped Coach Troy Sunderland build up the Nittany Lions program from 35th to 6th nationally, with two top-five recruiting classes. He was at the University of Missouri as the assistant head coach under Brian Smith and was the head coach of the Sunkist Kids Wrestling Club until 2014. In May 2014, Henson was appointed head coach of the West Virginia Mountaineers.

== See also ==
- List of Pennsylvania State University Olympians
