= David Legrand =

French wrestler

Personal information
- Nationality: French
- Born: 24 February 1972 (age 54) Boulogne-sur-Mer, France

Sport
- Sport: Wrestling

David Legrand (born 24 February 1972) is a French wrestler. He competed in the men's freestyle 52 kg at the 1996 Summer Olympics.
