= Roman Kollar =

Slovak wrestler

Personal information
- Nationality: Slovak
- Born: 22 September 1974 (age 51) Dunajská Streda, Czechoslovakia

Sport
- Sport: Wrestling

Roman Kollar (born 22 September 1974) is a Slovak wrestler. He competed in the men's freestyle 52 kg at the 1996 Summer Olympics.
