= Leonid Chuchunov =

Russian wrestler

Personal information
- Nationality: Russian
- Born: 27 December 1974 (age 51) Abakan, Russia

Sport
- Sport: Wrestling

Leonid Chuchunov (born 27 December 1974) is a Russian wrestler. He competed in the men's freestyle 54 kg at the 2000 Summer Olympics.
