= Vitalie Railean =

Moldovan wrestler

Personal information
- Nationality: Moldovian
- Born: 23 August 1975 (age 50) Criuleni

Sport
- Sport: Wrestling

Vitalie Railean (born 23 August 1975) is a Moldovan wrestler. He was born in Criuleni. He placed sixth in Freestyle wrestling, light flyweight class, at the 1996 Summer Olympics in Atlanta. He placed seventh in the bantamweight class at the 2000 Summer Olympics in Sydney.
