= Jin Ju-dong =

North Korean wrestler (born 1972)

- Hangul: 진주동
- RR: Jin Judong
- MR: Chin Chudong

Jin Ju-Dong (Korean: 진주동; born 14 August 1972) is a Korean former wrestler who competed in the 2000 Summer Olympics.
