= Gholamreza Mohammadi =

Iranian wrestler (born 1970)

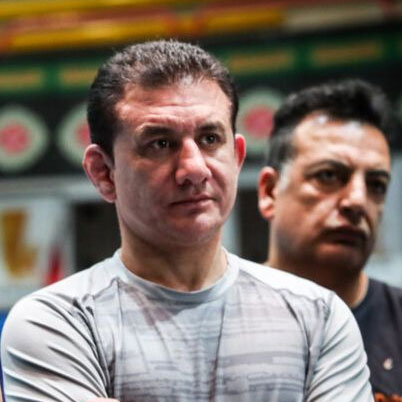

Personal information
- Nationality: Iranian
- Born: 29 December 1970 (age 55) Khorramabad, Iran
- Occupations: former wrestler, coach

Sport
- Country: Iran
- Sport: Wrestling
Medal record
As wrestler
Representing Iran
Men's freestyle wrestling
World Championships
Silver medal – second place	1993 Toronto	52 kg
Silver medal – second place	1995 Atlanta	52 kg
Bronze medal – third place	1994 Istanbul	52 kg
Bronze medal – third place	1998 Tehran	54 kg
Asian Championships
Bronze medal – third place	1997 Tehran	54 kg

Gholamreza Mohammadi (Persian: غلامرضا محمدی, born 29 December 1970 in Khorramabad) is an Iranian freestyle wrestling coach and former wrestler.

Mohammadi is currently the head coach of the Iran's freestyle wrestling national team. He was also the head coach of the Iranian national wrestling team from 2005 to 2010.

== Awards and honors ==
=== As head coach ===
- World Wrestling Championships
  - 2019: (bronze) Nur-Sultan, Kazakhstan
  - 2013: (gold) Budapest, Hungary
  - 2011: (silver) Istanbul, Turkey
  - 2010: 4th, Moscow, Russia
  - 2009: (bronze) Herning, Denmark
  - 2006: (silver) Guangzhou, China
  - 2005: 6th, Budapest, Hungary
- Wrestling World Cup
  - 2013: (gold) Tehran, Iran
  - 2011: (silver) Makhachkala, Russia
  - 2010: (silver) Moscow Russia
  - 2009: (silver) Tehran, Iran
  - 2007: (silver) Krasnoyarsk, Russia
- Asian Wrestling Championships
  - 2020: (gold) New Delhi, India
  - 2019: (gold) Xi'an, China
  - 2011: (silver) Tashkent, Uzbekistan
  - 2010: (gold) New Delhi, India
  - 2009: (gold) Pattaya, Thailand
  - 2005: (gold) Wuhan, China
  - 2003: (gold) New Delhi, India
- Asian Games
  - 2010: (gold) Guangzhou, China
  - 2006: (silver) Doha, Qatar
- World University Wrestling Championships
  - 2016: (gold) Çorum, Turkey
- Summer Universiade
  - 2005: 4th, İzmir, Turkey
  - 2013: 8th, Kazan, Russia
- Cadet World Wrestling Championship
  - 2018: (gold) Zagreb, Croatia
  - 2017: 4th, Athens, Greece
- Cadet Asian Wrestling Championship
  - 2018: (gold) Tashkent, Uzbekistan
  - 2017: (gold) Bangkok, Thailand
  - 2007: (gold) Taichung, Chinese Taipei
