= Vasilij Zeiher =

German wrestler

Personal information
- Nationality: German
- Born: 18 July 1971 (age 55) Căinari, Moldovan SSR, Soviet Union

Sport
- Sport: Wrestling

Vasilij Zeiher (born 18 July 1971) is a German wrestler. He competed in the men's freestyle 54 kg at the 2000 Summer Olympics.
