= Wilfredo García =

Cuban wrestler (born 1977)

Personal information
- Nationality: Cuban
- Born: 29 October 1977 (age 48) San Juan y Martinez, Pinar del Rio Province, Cuba

Sport
- Sport: Wrestling
Medal record
Representing Cuba
World Wrestling Championships
Gold medal – first place	1997 Krasnoyarsk	-54kg freestyle
Pan American Games
Gold medal – first place	1999 Winnipeg	-54kg freestyle
Central American and Caribbean Games
Gold medal – first place	1998 Maracaibo	-54kg freestyle

Wilfredo García Quintana (born 29 October 1977) is a Cuban wrestler. He competed in the men's freestyle 54 kg at the 2000 Summer Olympics. He was a gold medalist at the world championships in Russia in 1992.
