= Ivan Tsonov =

Bulgarian wrestler (born 1966)

Medal record

Men's freestyle wrestling

Representing Bulgaria

Olympic Games
Silver medal – second place	1988 Seoul	48 kg

Ivan Tsonov (Bulgarian: Иван Цонов; born 31 July 1966) is a Bulgarian former wrestler who competed in the 1988 Summer Olympics and in the 2000 Summer Olympics.
