= Kripa Shankar Patel =

Indian professional wrestler and coach

Kripa Shankar Patel Bishnoi
Personal information
- Native name: कृपाचंद पटेल बिश्नोई
- Full name: Kripa Shankar Patel
- Nationality: india
- Born: 5 August 1977 (age 49) Indore City, Indore district, Madhya Pradesh, India
- Height: 165 cm (5 ft 5 in) (2017)
- Weight: 55 kg (121 lb) (2010)

Sport
- Country: India
- Event: 55 kg freestyle
- Club: Master Chandgiram Akhara, Delhi
- Team: Indian Wrestling Team
- Coached by: Master Chandgi Ram ji & Shivram Patel
Medal record
Representing India
Men's Freestyle Wrestling
Commonwealth Games
Bronze medal – third place	1994 Victoria CANADA (FS)	52 kg
Asian Championships
Bronze medal – third place	2003 New Delhi (FS)	55 kg
Commonwealth Championship
Silver medal – second place	2003 Ontario CANADA (FS)	55 kg
Gold medal – first place	2005 Cape Town (FS)	55 kg
Gold medal – first place	2005 Cape Town (GR)	55 kg
Gold medal – first place	2007 Ontario CANADA (FR)	55 kg
Silver medal – second place	2007 Ontario CANADA (GR)	55 kg
World Cadet Championships
Bronze medal – third place	1990 Szombathely, HONGRIE (FS)	47 kg
Silver medal – second place	1991 Alma, CANADA (FS)	51 kg
Asian Cadet Championships
Gold medal – first place	1989 New Delhi, INDIA (FS)	43 kg
South Asian Games
Gold medal – first place	1995 Madras, INDIA (FS)	52 kg
Gold medal – first place	1999 Kathmandu, NEPAL (FS)	54 kg
Gold medal – first place	2004 Islamabad, PAKISTAN (FS)	54 kg
Silver medal – second place	2010 Dhaka, BANGLADESH (FS)	60 kg

Kripa Shankar Patel Bishnoi (born 5 August 1977) is an Indian professional wrestler and coach.

== Biography ==
Kripa Shankar Patel Bishnoi was born on 5 August 1977, in Khandwa (district of Harsud tehsil in Madhya Pradesh). He completed a diploma course in sports coaching at the Netaji Subhas National Institute of Sports (India). He passed the United World Wrestling International Referee Course with distinction in 2016. Subsequently, Bishnoi was named to United World Wrestling's international panel of referees.

== Wrestling career ==
He has participated in 53 international wrestling competitions, winning 11 gold, 8 silver, and 5 bronze medals.

Mr. Patel represented India in Asian cadet wrestling competition held from 3 to 5 December 1989 and by beating the Iranian wrestler K.D. Mohammad with a great score of 8/1 established his first step in international wrestling scenario and then always remained glittering in the whole world representing India. Bishnoi passed the Level-1 coaching course organised under the aegis of Wrestling Federation of India and United World Wrestling (UWW) in the year 2024. He has also rejoined the coaching panel of Wrestling Federation of India.

=== Commonwealth Games ===
Competing in the Flyweight division, Bishnoi was a bronze medalist at the 15th edition of the Commonwealth Games.

=== Commonwealth Wrestling Championship Events ===
Bishnoi competed in Commonwealth Wrestling Championship tournaments, achieving medals in multiple disciplines. He is the only wrestler who made a world record of winning 2 golds in 1 competition but in different categories (freestyle wrestling and Greco-Roman wrestling). 2003 (London, Canada)

Silver medal –

2005 (Cape Town, South Africa)

Gold medal – under 55 weight category, Freestyle wrestling
Gold medal – under 55 weight category, Greco-Roman wrestling

2007 (London, Canada)

Gold medal – Freestyle wrestling
Silver medal – Greco-Roman wrestling

=== Olympic Qualifying Events ===
Bishnoi represented India four times in Olympic qualifying tournaments: 2000, Leipzig, Germany, 5th place; 2000, Tokyo, Japan, 10th place; 2000, Minsk, Belarus; 2008, Warsaw, Poland. He also competed at World Cup events in Canada, winning gold in 2003 and 2007. In Canada World Cup Mr. Patel competed with all wrestlers and proved to be a perfectionist in his sport by winning a gold in Canada World Cup (11 to 12 July 2003, Canada).

=== Asian Competitions ===
Bishnoi competed in the 1998 Asian Games (Bangkok, Thailand) and 2002 Asian Games (Bussan, South Korea), and in the Asian Wrestling Championships, placing 4th in 2000 (Gulin, China), 4th in 2001 (Ulaanbaatar, Mongolia), and earning a bronze medal in 2003 Asian Wrestling Championships (New Delhi, India). Bishnoi won gold medals at the 7th, 8th, and 9th editions of the South Asian Games.

=== Awards ===
In 2000, Bishnoi received the Arjuna Award in recognition of outstanding National (India) achievement in sport. In 1994 he was a recipient of the Vikram Award.

=== Coaching ===
After retiring from wrestling competition, Bishnoi served as coach for Indian female wrestlers at the senior national coaching camp, contributing to a 2016 bronze medal in women's wrestling in 2016 Summer Olympics for India. Bishnoi is also a referee.

== Bollywood career ==
Bishnoi was recruited to train Aamir Khan, Fatima Sana Shaikh, Sanya Malhotra, and supporting actors for the Bollywood movie Dangal. The film is based on the life of renowned Indian wrestler Mahavir Singh Phogat, who coached his daughters, Geeta Phogat and Babita Kumari to gold medals at the 2010 Commonwealth Games. Working with the actors for over six months prior to filming, Bishnoi focused on wrestling moves and general conditioning. The film was 2017's highest-grossing sports film worldwide. Following the film's release, Bishnoi defended Khan against allegations that the actor has used steroids during his physical training regime.

== Controversy ==
In 2017, the Wrestling Federation of India imposed a six-year ban on Bishnoi, following Bishnoi's criticism of the organization. Bishnoi has become an advocate and vocal proponent of changes he has proposed for regulations governed by the (Indian) National and International wrestling federations.
