= Namig Abdullayev =

Azerbaijani freestyle wrestler

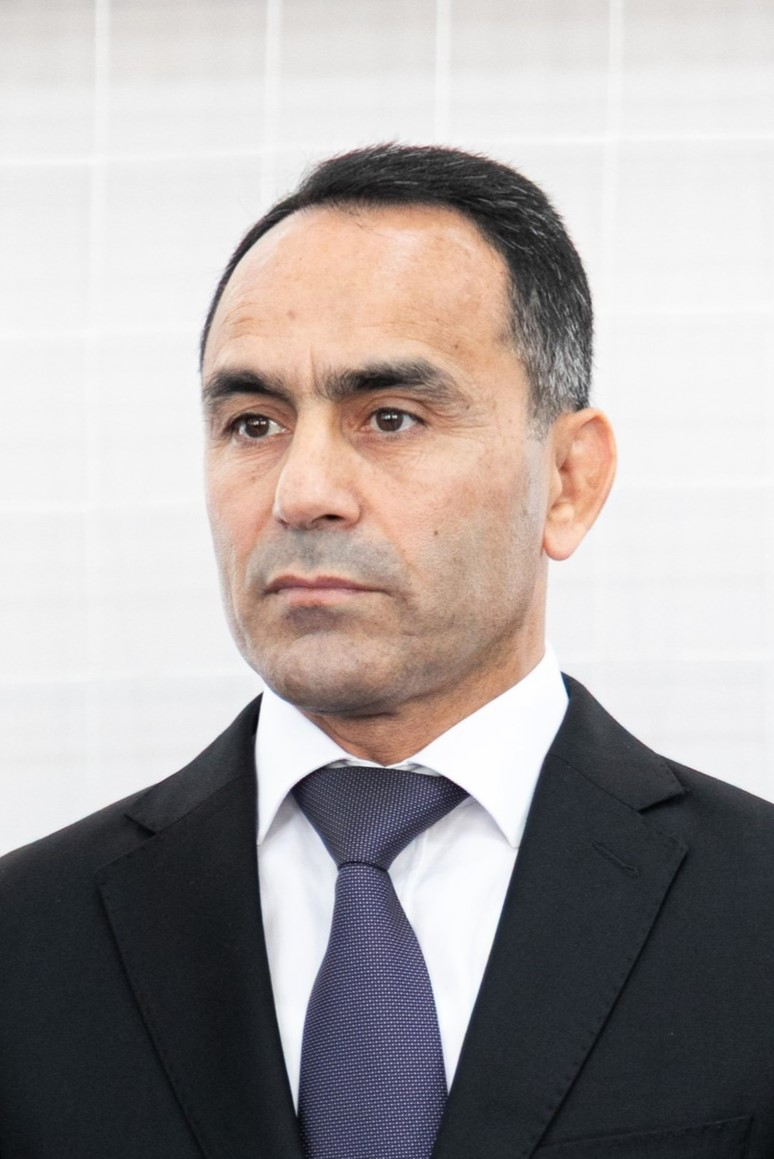
- Abdullayev in 2025

Personal information
- Born: 4 January 1971 (age 55) Baku, Azerbaijan SSR, Soviet Union
- Height: 1.60 m (5 ft 3 in)
- Weight: 55 kg (121 lb)

Sport
- Sport: Freestyle wrestling
- Club: Neftçi, Baku
Medal record
Men's freestyle wrestling
Representing Azerbaijan
Olympic Games
Gold medal – first place	2000 Sydney	55 kg
Silver medal – second place	1996 Atlanta	52 kg
World Championships
Silver medal – second place	1994 Istanbul	52 kg
Silver medal – second place	1998 Tehran	54 kg
Silver medal – second place	2002 Tehran	55 kg
Bronze medal – third place	2006 Guangzhou	55 kg
European Championships
Gold medal – first place	1994 Rome	52 kg
Gold medal – first place	1995 Fribourg	52kg
Gold medal – first place	2003 Rijeka	54 kg
Silver medal – second place	1997 Warsaw	52 kg
Silver medal – second place	2006 Moscow	55 kg
Bronze medal – third place	1996 Budapest	52 kg
World Cup
Gold medal – first place	2004 Baku	55 kg

Namig Yadulla Abdullayev (Azerbaijani: Namiq Abdullayev, born 4 January 1971) is an Azerbaijani retired freestyle wrestler, who won the 2000 Summer Olympics gold medal in 55 kg, as well as three gold medals at European championships and three silver medals at world championships.

A three-time Olympian, Abdullayev won the silver medal at the 1996 Summer Olympics in the 52 kg category and the gold in the 55 kg weight class at the 2000 Summer Olympics. He also competed at the 2004 Summer Olympics, but was eliminated early.

Abdullayev retired in 2009.

== Personal life ==
He is originally from the village of Ağdərə in the Khizi district.

Abdullayev is married and lives in Baku. He is the brother of world champion wrestler Arif Abdullayev.

Olympic Games
Preceded by Nazim Huseynov	Flagbearer for Azerbaijan; Sydney 2000	Succeeded by Nizami Pashayev
