= Tümendembereliin Züünbayan =

Mongolian wrestler (born 1974)

Personal information
- Nationality: Mongolian
- Born: 20 January 1974 (age 52)
- Height: 156 cm (5 ft 1 in)
- Weight: 56 kg (123 lb)

Sport
- Sport: Wrestling
Medal record
Men's freestyle wrestling
Representing Mongolia
Asian Games
Silver medal – second place	1994 Hiroshima	48 kg
Asian Wrestling Championships
Bronze medal – third place	1995 Manila	48 kg
Gold medal – first place	2001 Ulaanbaatar	48 kg

Tümendembereliin Züünbayan (born 20 January 1974) is a Mongolian wrestler. He competed in the men's freestyle 54 kg at the 2000 Summer Olympics.
