= Nurdin Donbaev =

Kyrgyzstani wrestler (born 1974)

Personal information
- Nationality: Kyrgyzstani
- Born: 31 July 1974 (age 51)

Sport
- Sport: Wrestling

Nurdin Donbaev (born 31 July 1974) is a Kyrgyzstani wrestler. He competed in the men's freestyle 54 kg at the 2000 Summer Olympics.
