= Chikara Tanabe =

Japanese freestyle wrestler (born 1975)

Medal record

Men's freestyle wrestling

Representing Japan

Olympic Games
Bronze medal – third place	2004 Athens	55 kg

Chikara Tanabe (田南部 力, Tanabe Chikara; born April 20, 1975) is a Japanese wrestler who competed in the Men's Freestyle 55 kg at the 2004 Summer Olympics and won the bronze medal.

== Awards ==
- Tokyo Sports
  - Wrestling Special Award (2004)
