= Amiran Kardanov =

Russian and Greek Freestyle wrestler (born 1976)

Personal information
- Native name: Амиран Авданович Карданов
- Full name: Amiran Avdanovich Kardanov
- Nationality: Russia
- Born: 19 August 1976 (age 49) Chikola, North Ossetian ASSR, Russian SFSR, Soviet Union
- Height: 1.62 m (5 ft 4 in)

Sport
- Country: Russia Greece
- Sport: Wrestling
- Weight class: 54 kg
- Event: Freestyle
- Coached by: Christos Aleksandridis; Panagotis Kutsupakis

Achievements and titles
- Olympic finals: (bronze) (2000) 4th(2004)
- World finals: 4th(1998)
- Regional finals: (silver) (2001)(2003) (bronze) (1998)(2006) 4th(2000)(2004)
Medal record
Men's freestyle wrestling
Representing Greece
Olympic Games
Bronze medal – third place	2000 Sydney	54 kg
European Championships
Silver medal – second place	2003 Riga	55 kg
Silver medal – second place	2001 Budapest	54 kg
Bronze medal – third place	2006 Moscow	55 kg
Bronze medal – third place	1998 Bratislava	54 kg
Mediterranean Games
Gold medal – first place	2001 Tunis	54 kg
Representing Russia
World Juniors Championships
Gold medal – first place	1994 Budapest	54 kg

Amiran Kardanov (Greek: Αμιράν Καρντάνοφ, born 19 August 1976) is a Russian and Greek Freestyle wrestler. He won a bronze medal at the 2000 Summer Olympics, and also competed at the 1996 Summer Olympics and 2004 Summer Olympics, coming in 4th place in the latter. Kardanov won four medals at the European Wrestling Championships.
