= Maulen Mamyrov =

Kazakhstani freestyle wrestler

Mamyrov Maulen
Personal information
- Nationality: Kazakhstan
- Born: December 14, 1970 (age 55)
- Height: 57 kg
- Weight: 160 cm

Sport
- Country: Soviet Union; Kazakhstan (since 1993)
- Club: National Team Kazakhstan
- Coached by: A.Bugubaev
Medal record
Men's freestyle wrestling
Representing Kazakhstan
Olympic Games
Bronze medal – third place	1996 Atlanta	52 kg
World Championships
Bronze medal – third place	1997 Krasnoyarsk	54 kg
Asian Games
Gold medal – first place	1994 Hiroshima	52 kg
Bronze medal – third place	1998 Bangkok	54 kg
Asian Wrestling Championships
Gold medal – first place	1999 Tashkent	54 kg
East Asian Games
Gold medal – first place	2001 Osaka	54 kg
Gold medal – first place	1997 Pusan	54 kg
Representing Soviet Union
USSR Championship
Bronze medal – third place	1991 Zaporoshe	52 kg
Junior World Championship
Bronze medal – third place	1988 Wolfurt	46 kg

Maulen Mamyrov (Мәулен Сатымбайұлы Мамыров; born December 14, 1970) is a Kazakhstani wrestler. At the 1996 Summer Olympics he won the bronze medal in the Men's Freestyle Flyweight (48–52 kg) category.

== Achievements ==
- 1993 Asian Championship: 52.0 kg Freestyle (4th)
- 1994 Asian Games: 52.0 kg Freestyle (1st)
- 1995 Asian Championship: 57.0 kg Freestyle (5th)
- 1995 World Championship: 52.0 kg Freestyle (12th)
- 1996 Asian Championship: 52.0 kg Freestyle (4th)
- 1997 World Championship: 54.0 kg Freestyle (3rd)
- 1998 World Championship: 54.0 kg Freestyle (11th)
- 1998 Asian Games: 54.0 kg Freestyle (3rd)
- 1999 World Championship: 54.0 kg Freestyle (7th)
- 1999 Asian Championship: 54.0 kg Freestyle (1st)
- 2001 World Championship: 54.0 kg Freestyle (4th)
- 2002 Asian Games: 55.0 kg Freestyle (4th)
