= Adkhamjon Achilov =

Uzbek wrestler (born 1976)

Personal information
- Nationality: Uzbekistani
- Born: 7 April 1976 (age 50)

Sport
- Sport: Wrestling
Medal record
Wrestling
Representing Uzbekistan
World Championships
Silver medal – second place	1999 Ankara	54 kg
Asian Championships
Gold medal – first place	1996 Xiaoshan	52 kg
Gold medal – first place	2004 Tehran	54 kg
Bronze medal – third place	1999 Tashkent	54 kg
Bronze medal – third place	2000 Guilin	54 kg

Adkhamjon Achilov (born 7 April 1976) is an Uzbek wrestler. He competed at the 1996 Summer Olympics and the 2000 Summer Olympics.
