= 2003 World Wrestling Championships – Men's freestyle 96 kg =

Men's freestyle 96 kg at the 2003 World Championships
- Venue: Madison Square Garden
- Dates: 12–14 September 2003
- Competitors: 36 from 36 nations

Medalists
gold medal	Eldar Kurtanidze	Georgia
silver medal	Alireza Heidari	Iran
bronze medal	Krasimir Kochev	Bulgaria

The men's freestyle 96 kilograms is a competition featured at the 2003 World Wrestling Championships, and was held at the Madison Square Garden in New York, United States from 12 to 14 September 2003.

== Results ==
Legend

- F — Won by fall

=== Preliminary round ===
==== Pool 1 ====
Pos	Athlete	Pld	W	L	CP	TP	IRI	LAT	NED
1	Alireza Heidari (IRI)	2	2	0	8	20	—	10–0	10–0
2	Igors Samušonoks (LAT)	2	1	1	4	4	0–4 ST	—	4–2 Fall
3	George Torchinava (NED)	2	0	2	0	2	0–4 ST	0–4 TO	—

Source: Official website

==== Pool 2 ====
Pos	Athlete	Pld	W	L	CP	TP	BLR	GRE	GER
1	Aleksandr Shemarov (BLR)	2	2	0	6	9	—	4–3	5–0
2	Aftantil Xanthopoulos (GRE)	2	1	1	4	9	1–3 PP	—	6–2
3	Cengiz Çakıcı (GER)	2	0	2	1	2	0–3 PO	1–3 PP	—

Source: Official website

==== Pool 3 ====
Pos	Athlete	Pld	W	L	CP	TP	BRA	CMR	VEN
1	Antoine Jaoude (BRA)	2	2	0	6	13	—	4–1	9–0
2	Alain Djoumessi (CMR)	2	1	1	4	8	1–3 PP	—	7–3
3	Luis Vivenes (VEN)	2	0	2	1	3	0–3 PO	1–3 PP	—

Source: Official website

==== Pool 4 ====
Pos	Athlete	Pld	W	L	CP	TP	USA	LTU	TUR
1	Daniel Cormier (USA)	2	2	0	7	19	—	10–0	9–3
2	Ričardas Pauliukonis (LTU)	2	1	1	4	0	0–4 ST	—	WO
3	Hakan Koç (TUR)	2	0	2	1	3	1–3 PP	0–4 PA	—

Source: Official website

==== Pool 5 ====
Pos	Athlete	Pld	W	L	CP	TP	AUT	PLE	ESP
1	Radovan Valach (AUT)	2	2	0	6	13	—	4–1	9–2
2	Jehad Hamdan (PLE)	2	1	1	4	10	1–3 PP	—	9–1
3	Nicolás Castro (ESP)	2	0	2	2	3	1–3 PP	1–3 PP	—

Source: Official website

==== Pool 6 ====
Pos	Athlete	Pld	W	L	CP	TP	BUL	SVK	AUS
1	Krasimir Kochev (BUL)	2	2	0	7	4	—	4–0	WO
2	Peter Pecha (SVK)	2	1	1	4	0	0–3 PO	—	WO
3	Igor Praporshchikov (AUS)	2	0	2	0	0	0–4 EF	0–4 EF	—

Source: Official website

==== Pool 7 ====
Pos	Athlete	Pld	W	L	CP	TP	CAN	HUN	CHN
1	Dean Schmeichel (CAN)	2	2	0	6	9	—	4–0	5–2
2	Zoltán Farkas (HUN)	2	1	1	4	3	0–3 PO	—	3–0 Fall
3	Wang Yuanyuan (CHN)	2	0	2	1	2	1–3 PP	0–4 TO	—

Source: Official website

==== Pool 8 ====
Pos	Athlete	Pld	W	L	CP	TP	POL	KAZ	ITA
1	Bartłomiej Bartnicki (POL)	2	2	0	6	7	—	3–2	4–2
2	Nurzhan Katayev (KAZ)	2	1	1	5	10	1–3 PP	—	8–0 Fall
3	Vincenzo Lipari (ITA)	2	0	2	1	2	1–3 PP	0–4 TO	—

Source: Official website

==== Pool 9 ====
Pos	Athlete	Pld	W	L	CP	TP	GEO	SUI	UZB
1	Eldar Kurtanidze (GEO)	2	2	0	6	9	—	4–0	5–0
2	Rolf Scherrer (SUI)	2	1	1	3	3	0–3 PO	—	3–2
3	Magomed Ibragimov (UZB)	2	0	2	1	2	0–3 PO	1–3 PP	—

Source: Official website

==== Pool 10 ====
Pos	Athlete	Pld	W	L	CP	TP	UKR	RUS	KOR
1	Vadim Tasoyev (UKR)	2	2	0	6	12	—	4–3	8–0
2	Taimuraz Tigiyev (RUS)	2	1	1	5	21	1–3 PP	—	18–0
3	Koo Hak-ja (KOR)	2	0	2	0	0	0–3 PO	0–4 ST	—

Source: Official website

==== Pool 11 ====
Pos	Athlete	Pld	W	L	CP	TP	MGL	JPN	ISR
1	Tüvshintöriin Enkhtuyaa (MGL)	2	2	0	6	4	—	1–1	3–0
2	Yoshihiro Nakao (JPN)	2	1	1	4	5	1–3 PP	—	4–0
3	Yan Virin (ISR)	2	0	2	0	0	0–3 PO	0–3 PO	—

Source: Official website

==== Pool 12 ====
Pos	Athlete	Pld	W	L	CP	TP	NAM	GBR	UGA
1	Nico Jacobs (NAM)	2	2	0	8	12	—	8–3 Fall	4–0 Fall
2	Johannes Rossouw (GBR)	2	1	1	4	7	0–4 TO	—	4–0 Fall
3	Rodgers Kiwanuka (UGA)	2	0	2	0	0	0–4 TO	0–4 TO	—

Source: Official website

=== Knockout round ===
Round of 16
Alireza Heidari (IRI)	6
Aleksandr Shemarov (BLR)	6
Antoine Jaoude (BRA)	0
Daniel Cormier (USA)	6^{F}
Radovan Valach (AUT)	9
Krasimir Kochev (BUL)	13
Dean Schmeichel (CAN)	2
Bartłomiej Bartnicki (POL)	3

Quarterfinals
Alireza Heidari (IRI)	6
Daniel Cormier (USA)	3
Krasimir Kochev (BUL)	5
Bartłomiej Bartnicki (POL)	1
Eldar Kurtanidze (GEO)	2
Vadim Tasoyev (UKR)	0
Tüvshintöriin Enkhtuyaa (MGL)	4
Nico Jacobs (NAM)	1

Semifinals
Alireza Heidari (IRI)	3
Krasimir Kochev (BUL)	1
Eldar Kurtanidze (GEO)	4
Tüvshintöriin Enkhtuyaa (MGL)	0

Final
Alireza Heidari (IRI)	0
Eldar Kurtanidze (GEO)	4
Bronze medal match
Krasimir Kochev (BUL)	5
Tüvshintöriin Enkhtuyaa (MGL)	1
