= 2005 World Wrestling Championships – Men's freestyle 96 kg =

Men's freestyle 96 kg at the 2005 World Championships
- Venue: László Papp Budapest Sports Arena
- Dates: 27 September 2005
- Competitors: 31 from 31 nations

Medalists
| gold medal | Khadzhimurat Gatsalov | Russia |
| silver medal | Eldar Kurtanidze | Georgia |
| bronze medal | Aleksey Krupnyakov | Kyrgyzstan |
| bronze medal | Vasyl Tesmynetskyi | Ukraine |

The men's freestyle 96 kilograms is a competition featured at the 2005 World Wrestling Championships, and was held at the László Papp Budapest Sports Arena in Budapest, Hungary on 27 September 2005.

This freestyle wrestling competition consists of a single-elimination tournament, with a repechage used to determine the winner of two bronze medals.

== Results ==
Legend

- F — Won by fall

=== Final ===
| Final |
| Eldar Kurtanidze (GEO) | 0 | 0 |
| Khadzhimurat Gatsalov (RUS) | 1 | 1 |

=== Top half ===
Round of 32
Eldar Kurtanidze (GEO) | 5 | 2
Koo Tae-hyun (KOR) | 1 | 0
Marc Buschle (GER) | 2 | 1
Anil Kumar Mann (IND) | 2 | 0
Nurzhan Katayev (KAZ) | 3 | 1
Luis Vivenes (VEN) | 0 | 0
Michel Batista (CUB) | 1 | 1 | 0
Aleksey Krupnyakov (KGZ) | 1 | 2 | 2
Daniel Cormier (USA) | 4 | 3
Peter Pecha (SVK) | 0 | 0
Nicolae Ghiță (ROM) | 0 | 1
Rustam Aghayev (AZE) | 1 | 1
Dimitar Kumchev (BUL) | 0 | 1
Amir Abbas Moradi Ganji (IRI) | 1 | 6^{F}

Round of 16
Hardip Bassi (AUS) | 0 | 0
Eldar Kurtanidze (GEO) | 5 | 5
Marc Buschle (GER) | 3 | 0
Nurzhan Katayev (KAZ) | 4 | 1
Aleksey Krupnyakov (KGZ) | 2 | 8
Daniel Cormier (USA) | 1 | 1
Rustam Aghayev (AZE) | 0 | 1
Amir Abbas Moradi Ganji (IRI) | 1 | 5

Quarterfinals
Eldar Kurtanidze (GEO) | 1 | 1
Nurzhan Katayev (KAZ) | 0 | 0
Aleksey Krupnyakov (KGZ) | 5^{F}
Amir Abbas Moradi Ganji (IRI) | 0

Semifinals
Eldar Kurtanidze (GEO) | 3 | 1
Aleksey Krupnyakov (KGZ) | 0 | 0

=== Bottom half ===
Round of 32
Boldyn Sainbayar (MGL) | 3 | 0 | 0
Bartłomiej Bartnicki (POL) | 0 | 3 | 5
Fatih Çakıroğlu (TUR) | 1 | 1
Rolf Scherrer (SUI) | 0 | 0
Lawrence Langowski (MEX) | 1 | 0
Vincenzo Lipari (ITA) | 1 | 4
Ali Moukdad (LIB) | 0
Siarhei Pernikau (BLR) | 4^{F}
Vincent Aka-Akesse (FRA) | 1 | 0 | 0
Oleg Kallagov (UZB) | 1 | 1 | 1
Cui Xiaocheng (CHN) | 1 | 1
Vasyl Tesmynetskyi (UKR) | 3 | 4
Kiyotaka Kodaira (JPN) | 0 | 0
Khadzhimurat Gatsalov (RUS) | 2 | 5
Gergely Kiss (HUN) | 1 | 3
Dean Schmeichel (CAN) | 1 | 0

Round of 16
Bartłomiej Bartnicki (POL) | 0 | 1 | 2
Fatih Çakıroğlu (TUR) | 3 | 0 | 0
Vincenzo Lipari (ITA) | 0 | 1
Siarhei Pernikau (BLR) | 2 | 2
Oleg Kallagov (UZB) | 0 | 1 | 0
Vasyl Tesmynetskyi (UKR) | 1 | 1 | 1
Khadzhimurat Gatsalov (RUS) | 6 | 2
Gergely Kiss (HUN) | 0 | 0

Quarterfinals
Bartłomiej Bartnicki (POL) | 1 | 3 | 0
Siarhei Pernikau (BLR) | 2 | 1 | 1
Vasyl Tesmynetskyi (UKR) | 1 | 0
Khadzhimurat Gatsalov (RUS) | 1 | 2

Semifinals
Siarhei Pernikau (BLR) | 0 | 0
Khadzhimurat Gatsalov (RUS) | 3 | 3

=== Repechage ===
Repechage round 1
Koo Tae-hyun (KOR) | 6 | 5
Hardip Bassi (AUS) | 0 | 0
Kiyotaka Kodaira (JPN) | 1 | 1
Gergely Kiss (HUN) | 1 | 3

Repechage round 2
Koo Tae-hyun (KOR) | 1 | 1
Nurzhan Katayev (KAZ) | 0 | 1
Gergely Kiss (HUN) | 0 | 1
Vasyl Tesmynetskyi (UKR) | 4 | 3

Bronze medals
Koo Tae-hyun (KOR) | 0 | 0
Aleksey Krupnyakov (KGZ) | 5 | 4
Vasyl Tesmynetskyi (UKR) | 2 | 1 | 1
Siarhei Pernikau (BLR) | 1 | 1 | 0
