= 2007 World Wrestling Championships – Men's freestyle 96 kg =

Men's freestyle 96 kg at the 2007 World Championships
- Venue: Heydar Aliyev Sports and Concert Complex
- Dates: 21 September 2007
- Competitors: 42 from 42 nations

Medalists
gold medal	Khadzhimurat Gatsalov	Russia
silver medal	Saeid Ebrahimi	Iran
bronze medal	Kurban Kurbanov	Uzbekistan
bronze medal	Daniel Cormier	United States

The men's freestyle 96 kilograms is a competition featured at the 2007 World Wrestling Championships, and was held at the Heydar Aliyev Sports and Concert Complex in Baku, Azerbaijan on 21 September 2007.

== Results ==
Legend

- F — Won by fall

=== Finals ===
Semifinals			Final
Khadzhimurat Gatsalov (RUS)	1	1
Kurban Kurbanov (UZB)	0	0	Khadzhimurat Gatsalov (RUS)	1	2
Saeid Ebrahimi (IRI)	5	6	Saeid Ebrahimi (IRI)	0	0
Aleksey Krupnyakov (KGZ)	0	0

=== Top half ===
==== Section 1 ====
Round of 64

Round of 32
Mateusz Gucman (POL)	7	3
Matt White (PUR)	0	0
Tömörkhüügiin Enkh-Amgalan (MGL)	2	5^{F}
Francesco Miano-Petta (ITA)	0	0
Khadzhimurat Gatsalov (RUS)	2	1
Mihai Stroia (ROU)	0	0
Hakan Koç (TUR)	1	1
Edgar Yenokyan (ARM)	0	0

Round of 16
Mateusz Gucman (POL)	6	1
Tömörkhüügiin Enkh-Amgalan (MGL)	0	0
Khadzhimurat Gatsalov (RUS)	1	6
Hakan Koç (TUR)	0	2

Quarterfinals
Mateusz Gucman (POL)	0	0
Khadzhimurat Gatsalov (RUS)	2	3

==== Section 2 ====
Round of 64

Round of 32
Óscar Aguilar (MEX)	0	0
David Zilberman (CAN)	5	4^{F}
Viktor Bogdanov (MKD)	0	0
Kurban Kurbanov (UZB)	6	6
Andreas Sitanaris (CYP)	0	0
Nicolae Ceban (MDA)	5	6
Khetag Gazyumov (AZE)	3	4
Yang Wulin (CHN)	1	1

Round of 16
David Zilberman (CAN)	0	0
Kurban Kurbanov (UZB)	3	3
Nicolae Ceban (MDA)	0	2
Khetag Gazyumov (AZE)	3	8

Quarterfinals
Kurban Kurbanov (UZB)	2	0	1
Khetag Gazyumov (AZE)	1	2	0

=== Bottom half ===
==== Section 3 ====
Round of 64
Peter Pecha (SVK)	1	0	0
Nikolay Chterev (BUL)	0	1	1
Gergely Kiss (HUN)	0	0
Ruslan Sheikhau (BLR)	3	3

Round of 32
Kiyotaka Kodaira (JPN)	1	3
Ahmed Al-Darraji (IRQ)	0	0
Mindaugas Rumbutis (LTU)	0	0
Saeid Ebrahimi (IRI)	3	2
Ian Wardell (AUS)	0	0
Daniel Cormier (USA)	6	6
Nikolay Chterev (BUL)	1	0
Ruslan Sheikhau (BLR)	2	1

Round of 16
Kiyotaka Kodaira (JPN)	0	0
Saeid Ebrahimi (IRI)	1	6
Daniel Cormier (USA)	0	1	3
Ruslan Sheikhau (BLR)	1	0	0

Quarterfinals
Saeid Ebrahimi (IRI)	5	2
Daniel Cormier (USA)	0	1

==== Section 4 ====
Round of 64
Vincent Aka-Akesse (FRA)	0	0
Vasyl Tesmynetskyi (UKR)	1	2
Luis Vivenes (VEN)	3	2
Jun Kyung-min (KOR)	3	0
Vali Sharipov (TJK)	3	0
Rohit Patel (IND)	7	2
Florian Skilang Temengil (PLW)	0	0
Stefan Kehrer (GER)	7	6
Nurzhan Katayev (KAZ)	0	1
Michel Batista (CUB)	1	3
Hani Al-Marafi (JOR)	0	0
Aleksey Krupnyakov (KGZ)	7	4
Saleh Emara (EGY)	0	0
Giorgi Gogshelidze (GEO)	3	3
Grégory Martinetti (SUI)	0	1	2
Orestis Leonidis (GRE)	1	1	1

Round of 32
Vasyl Tesmynetskyi (UKR)	3	8^{F}
Luis Vivenes (VEN)	1	2
Rohit Patel (IND)	0	0
Stefan Kehrer (GER)	2	5^{F}
Michel Batista (CUB)	0	0
Aleksey Krupnyakov (KGZ)	1	2
Giorgi Gogshelidze (GEO)	4	3
Grégory Martinetti (SUI)	0	0

Round of 16
Vasyl Tesmynetskyi (UKR)	2	0	1
Stefan Kehrer (GER)	0	3	0
Aleksey Krupnyakov (KGZ)	4	1
Giorgi Gogshelidze (GEO)	0	1

Quarterfinals
Vasyl Tesmynetskyi (UKR)	1	0
Aleksey Krupnyakov (KGZ)	4	5

=== Repechage ===
Repechage round 2
Mihai Stroia (ROU)	0	0
Hakan Koç (TUR)	1	1
Mindaugas Rumbutis (LTU)	0	0
Kiyotaka Kodaira (JPN)	3	2

Repechage round 3
Hakan Koç (TUR)	1	1
Mateusz Gucman (POL)	0	0
Kiyotaka Kodaira (JPN)	0	0
Daniel Cormier (USA)	3	6

Bronze medals
Hakan Koç (TUR)	0	0
Kurban Kurbanov (UZB)	4	2
Daniel Cormier (USA)	1	0	1
Aleksey Krupnyakov (KGZ)	0	1	0
