= Wrestling at the 2002 Asian Games – Men's freestyle 96 kg =

Men's freestyle 96 kg at the 2002 Asian Games
- Venue: Yangsan Gymnasium
- Date: 7–8 October 2002
- Competitors: 11 from 11 nations

Medalists
gold medal	Alireza Heidari	Iran
silver medal	Aleksey Krupnyakov	Kyrgyzstan
bronze medal	Magomed Ibragimov	Uzbekistan

The men's freestyle 96 kilograms wrestling competition at the 2002 Asian Games in Busan was held on 7 October and 8 October at the Yangsan Gymnasium.

The competition held with an elimination system of three or four wrestlers in each pool, with the winners qualify for the semifinals and final by way of direct elimination.

== Schedule ==
All times are Korea Standard Time (UTC+09:00)

Date	Time	Event
Monday, 7 October 2002	10:00	Round 1
Monday, 7 October 2002	10:00	Round 2
Monday, 7 October 2002	16:00	Round 3
Monday, 7 October 2002	16:00	Repechage 1
Tuesday, 8 October 2002	10:00	Repechage 2
Tuesday, 8 October 2002	10:00	Repechage 3
Tuesday, 8 October 2002	10:00	1/2 finals
Tuesday, 8 October 2002	16:00	Finals

== Results ==
Legend

- F — Won by fall
- WO — Won by walkover

=== Preliminary ===
==== Pool 1 ====
Pos	Athlete	Pld	W	L	CP	TP	Qualification
1	Magomed Ibragimov (UZB)	2	2	0	8	15	Knockout round
2	Iqbal Ahmad Mancher (AFG)	2	1	1	3	5	Repechage
3	Marcus Valda (PHI)	2	0	2	1	4	

Source: Report

	Score		CP
Magomed Ibragimov (UZB)	5–0 Fall	Marcus Valda (PHI)	4–0 TO
Iqbal Ahmad Mancher (AFG)	0–10	Magomed Ibragimov (UZB)	0–4 ST
Marcus Valda (PHI)	4–5	Iqbal Ahmad Mancher (AFG)	1–3 PP

==== Pool 2 ====
Pos	Athlete	Pld	W	L	CP	TP	Qualification
1	Alireza Heidari (IRI)	3	3	0	10	17	Knockout round
2	Wang Yuanyuan (CHN)	3	2	1	8	14	Repechage
3	Islam Bayramukov (KAZ)	3	1	2	4	11	
4	Anil Kumar Mann (IND)	3	0	3	0	0	

Source: Report

	Score		CP
Alireza Heidari (IRI)	5–3 Fall	Wang Yuanyuan (CHN)	4–0 TO
Islam Bayramukov (KAZ)	11–0	Anil Kumar Mann (IND)	4–0 ST
Alireza Heidari (IRI)	4–0	Islam Bayramukov (KAZ)	3–0 PO
Wang Yuanyuan (CHN)	11–0	Anil Kumar Mann (IND)	4–0 ST
Alireza Heidari (IRI)	8–0	Anil Kumar Mann (IND)	3–0 PO
Wang Yuanyuan (CHN)	WO	Islam Bayramukov (KAZ)	4–0 PA

==== Pool 3 ====
Pos	Athlete	Pld	W	L	CP	TP	Qualification
1	Aleksey Krupnyakov (KGZ)	3	3	0	9	19	Knockout round
2	Kang Dong-kuk (KOR)	3	2	1	8	15	Repechage
3	Yoshihiro Nakao (JPN)	3	1	2	4	10	
4	Shareeda Waleed (QAT)	3	0	3	2	3	

Source: Report

	Score		CP
Yoshihiro Nakao (JPN)	0–3	Kang Dong-kuk (KOR)	0–3 PO
Shareeda Waleed (QAT)	2–8	Aleksey Krupnyakov (KGZ)	1–3 PP
Yoshihiro Nakao (JPN)	10–0	Shareeda Waleed (QAT)	4–0 ST
Kang Dong-kuk (KOR)	1–3	Aleksey Krupnyakov (KGZ)	1–3 PP
Yoshihiro Nakao (JPN)	0–8	Aleksey Krupnyakov (KGZ)	0–3 PO
Kang Dong-kuk (KOR)	11–1	Shareeda Waleed (QAT)	4–1 SP

=== Repechage ===
Pos	Athlete	Pld	W	L	CP	TP	Qualification
1	Wang Yuanyuan (CHN)	2	2	0	7	14	Knockout round
2	Kang Dong-kuk (KOR)	2	1	1	4	0	
3	Iqbal Ahmad Mancher (AFG)	2	0	2	0	0	

Source: Report

	Score		CP
Iqbal Ahmad Mancher (AFG)	0–10	Wang Yuanyuan (CHN)	0–4 ST
Kang Dong-kuk (KOR)	WO	Iqbal Ahmad Mancher (AFG)	4–0 PA
Wang Yuanyuan (CHN)	4–0	Kang Dong-kuk (KOR)	3–0 PO

=== Knockout round ===
1/2 finals
Magomed Ibragimov (UZB)	1
Alireza Heidari (IRI)	3
Aleksey Krupnyakov (KGZ)	9^{F}
Wang Yuanyuan (CHN)	1

Final
Alireza Heidari (IRI)	5
Aleksey Krupnyakov (KGZ)	0
3rd–4th place
Magomed Ibragimov (UZB)	5^{F}
Wang Yuanyuan (CHN)	3

== Final standing ==
Rank	Athlete
1st place, gold medalist(s)	Alireza Heidari (IRI)
2nd place, silver medalist(s)	Aleksey Krupnyakov (KGZ)
3rd place, bronze medalist(s)	Magomed Ibragimov (UZB)
4	Wang Yuanyuan (CHN)
5	Kang Dong-kuk (KOR)
6	Iqbal Ahmad Mancher (AFG)
7	Islam Bayramukov (KAZ)
8	Yoshihiro Nakao (JPN)
9	Shareeda Waleed (QAT)
10	Marcus Valda (PHI)
11	Anil Kumar Mann (IND)
