= Wrestling at the 2004 Summer Olympics – Men's freestyle 96 kg =

Men's freestyle 96 kg at the Games of the XXVIII Olympiad
- Venue: Ano Liosia Olympic Hall
- Date: 28–29 August 2004
- Competitors: 21 from 21 nations

Medalists
1st place, gold medalist(s)		Khadzhimurat Gatsalov	Russia
2nd place, silver medalist(s)		Magomed Ibragimov	Uzbekistan
3rd place, bronze medalist(s)		Alireza Heidari	Iran

The men's freestyle 96 kilograms at the 2004 Summer Olympics as part of the wrestling program were held at the Ano Liosia Olympic Hall, August 28 to August 29.

The competition held with an elimination system of three or four wrestlers in each pool, with the winners qualify for the quarterfinals, semifinals and final by way of direct elimination.

Future two division UFC champion Daniel Cormier competed in the tournament, finishing fourth.

== Schedule ==
All times are Eastern European Summer Time (UTC+03:00)

Date	Time	Event
28 August 2004	09:30	Round 1
28 August 2004	09:30	Round 2
28 August 2004	17:30	Round 3
29 August 2004	09:30	Qualification
29 August 2004	09:30	Semifinals
29 August 2004	14:00	Finals

== Results ==
Legend

- F — Won by fall

=== Elimination pools ===
==== Pool 1 ====
Pos	Athlete	Pld	W	L	CP	TP	Qualification
1	Wang Yuanyuan (CHN)	2	1	1	4 (Note: Tied on the number of wins by fall and superiority. Technical points were used to determine the last place. Wang and Pecha were ranked by their head-to-head result: CHN 3–1 SVK.)	5	Knockout round
2	Peter Pecha (SVK)	2	1	1	4	5	
3	Alexandros Laliotis (GRE)	2	1	1	4	4	

Source: Official website
Notes:

	Score		CP
Wang Yuanyuan (CHN)	2–3	Alexandros Laliotis (GRE)	1–3 PP
Peter Pecha (SVK)	1–3	Wang Yuanyuan (CHN)	1–3 PP
Alexandros Laliotis (GRE)	1–4	Peter Pecha (SVK)	1–3 PP

==== Pool 2 ====
Pos	Athlete	Pld	W	L	CP	TP	Qualification
1	Magomed Ibragimov (UZB)	2	2	0	6	7	Knockout round
2	Aleksey Krupnyakov (KGZ)	2	1	1	3	3	
3	Krasimir Kochev (BUL)	2	0	2	1	2	

Source: Official website

	Score		CP
Aleksey Krupnyakov (KGZ)	0–3	Magomed Ibragimov (UZB)	0–3 PO
Krasimir Kochev (BUL)	2–3	Aleksey Krupnyakov (KGZ)	1–3 PP
Magomed Ibragimov (UZB)	4–0	Krasimir Kochev (BUL)	3–0 PO

==== Pool 3 ====
Pos	Athlete	Pld	W	L	CP	TP	Qualification
1	Rustam Aghayev (AZE)	2	2	0	7	18	Knockout round
2	Islam Bayramukov (KAZ)	2	1	1	4	9	
3	Nico Jacobs (NAM)	2	0	2	1	1	

Source: Official website

	Score		CP
Rustam Aghayev (AZE)	7–2	Islam Bayramukov (KAZ)	3–1 PP
Nico Jacobs (NAM)	0–11	Rustam Aghayev (AZE)	0–4 ST
Islam Bayramukov (KAZ)	7–1	Nico Jacobs (NAM)	3–1 PP

==== Pool 4 ====
Pos	Athlete	Pld	W	L	CP	TP	Qualification
1	Alireza Heidari (IRI)	2	2	0	7	13	Knockout round
2	Eldar Kurtanidze (GEO)	2	1	1	5	8	
3	Antoine Jaoude (BRA)	2	0	2	0	0	

Source: Official website

	Score		CP
Eldar Kurtanidze (GEO)	2–3	Alireza Heidari (IRI)	1–3 PP
Antoine Jaoude (BRA)	0–6 Fall	Eldar Kurtanidze (GEO)	0–4 TO
Alireza Heidari (IRI)	10–0	Antoine Jaoude (BRA)	4–0 ST

==== Pool 5 ====
Pos	Athlete	Pld	W	L	CP	TP	Qualification
1	Khadzhimurat Gatsalov (RUS)	2	2	0	6	6	Knockout round
2	Vadim Tasoyev (UKR)	2	1	1	3	6	
3	Rolf Scherrer (SUI)	2	0	2	2	2	

Source: Official website

	Score		CP
Rolf Scherrer (SUI)	1–6	Vadim Tasoyev (UKR)	1–3 PP
Khadzhimurat Gatsalov (RUS)	3–1	Rolf Scherrer (SUI)	3–1 PP
Vadim Tasoyev (UKR)	0–3	Khadzhimurat Gatsalov (RUS)	0–3 PO

==== Pool 6 ====
Pos	Athlete	Pld	W	L	CP	TP	Qualification
1	Aleksandr Shemarov (BLR)	2	2	0	6	8	Knockout round
2	Fatih Çakıroğlu (TUR)	2	1	1	5	5	
3	Tüvshintöriin Enkhtuyaa (MGL)	2	0	2	0	0	

Source: Official website

	Score		CP
Fatih Çakıroğlu (TUR)	4–0 Fall	Tüvshintöriin Enkhtuyaa (MGL)	4–0 TO
Aleksandr Shemarov (BLR)	3–1	Fatih Çakıroğlu (TUR)	3–1 PP
Tüvshintöriin Enkhtuyaa (MGL)	0–5	Aleksandr Shemarov (BLR)	0–3 PO

==== Pool 7 ====
Pos	Athlete	Pld	W	L	CP	TP	Qualification
1	Daniel Cormier (USA)	2	2	0	6	19	Knockout round
2	Bartłomiej Bartnicki (POL)	2	1	1	4	5	
3	Radovan Valach (AUT)	2	0	2	1	1	

Source: Official website

	Score		CP
Radovan Valach (AUT)	0–9	Daniel Cormier (USA)	0–3 PO
Bartłomiej Bartnicki (POL)	4–1	Radovan Valach (AUT)	3–1 PP
Daniel Cormier (USA)	10–1	Bartłomiej Bartnicki (POL)	3–1 PP

=== Knockout round ===
Qualification
Wang Yuanyuan (CHN)	1
Magomed Ibragimov (UZB)	4
Rustam Aghayev (AZE)	0
Alireza Heidari (IRI)	5
Khadzhimurat Gatsalov (RUS)	3
Aleksandr Shemarov (BLR)	0

Semifinals
Magomed Ibragimov (UZB)	6
Alireza Heidari (IRI)	4
Khadzhimurat Gatsalov (RUS)	5
Daniel Cormier (USA)	0

Gold medal match
Magomed Ibragimov (UZB)	1
Khadzhimurat Gatsalov (RUS)	4
Bronze medal match
Alireza Heidari (IRI)	3
Daniel Cormier (USA)	2

Classification 5–6
Wang Yuanyuan (CHN)	3
Rustam Aghayev (AZE)	3^{F}

== Final standing ==
Rank	Athlete
1st place, gold medalist(s)	Khadzhimurat Gatsalov (RUS)
2nd place, silver medalist(s)	Magomed Ibragimov (UZB)
3rd place, bronze medalist(s)	Alireza Heidari (IRI)
4	Daniel Cormier (USA)
5	Rustam Aghayev (AZE)
6	Wang Yuanyuan (CHN)
7	Aleksandr Shemarov (BLR)
8	Eldar Kurtanidze (GEO)
9	Fatih Çakıroğlu (TUR)
10	Islam Bayramukov (KAZ)
11	Bartłomiej Bartnicki (POL)
12	Peter Pecha (SVK)
13	Alexandros Laliotis (GRE)
14	Vadim Tasoyev (UKR)
15	Aleksey Krupnyakov (KGZ)
16	Rolf Scherrer (SUI)
17	Krasimir Kochev (BUL)
18	Nico Jacobs (NAM)
19	Radovan Valach (AUT)
20	Antoine Jaoude (BRA)
21	Tüvshintöriin Enkhtuyaa (MGL)
