= Daniel Cormier =

American wrestler and mixed martial artist (born 1979)

- Cormier in 2026
- Born: Daniel Ryan Cormier; March 20, 1979 (age 47); Lafayette, Louisiana, U.S.
- Nickname: DC
- Height: 5 ft 11 in (180 cm)
- Weight: 251 lb (114 kg; 17 st 13 lb)
- Division: Light Heavyweight (2014–2018); Heavyweight (2009–2013, 2018–2020)
- Reach: 72 1/2 in (184 cm)
- Style: Wrestling
- Fighting out of: San Jose, California, U.S.
- Team: American Kickboxing Academy
- Trainer: Javier Mendez
- Rank: Brown belt in Brazilian jiu-jitsu under Léo Vieira
- Wrestling: Olympic freestyle wrestling NCAA Division I All-American
- Years active: 2002–2008 (freestyle wrestling); 2009–2020 (MMA)

Mixed martial arts record
- Total: 26
- Wins: 22
- By knockout: 10
- By submission: 5
- By decision: 7
- Losses: 3
- By knockout: 1
- By decision: 2
- No contests: 1

Other information
- University: Colby Community College; Oklahoma State University
- Notable school: Northside High School
- Website: danielcormierwrestling.com
- Mixed martial arts record from Sherdog
Medal record
Representing the United States
Men's freestyle wrestling
World Championships
Bronze medal – third place	2007 Baku	96 kg
World Cup
Silver medal – second place	2005 Tashkent	96 kg
Pan American Games
Gold medal – first place	2003 Santo Domingo	96 kg
Bronze medal – third place	2007 Rio de Janeiro	96 kg
Pan American Championships
Gold medal – first place	2002 Maracaibo	96 kg
Men's Greco-Roman wrestling
Cadet World Championships
Bronze medal – third place	1995 Prague	83 kg
Collegiate Wrestling
Representing Colby CC
NJCAA Championships
Gold medal – first place	1998 Bismarck	190 lb
Gold medal – first place	1999 Rochester	197 lb
Representing the Oklahoma State Cowboys
NCAA Division I Championships
Silver medal – second place	2001 Iowa City	184 lb
Big 12 Championships
Silver medal – second place	2000 Lincoln	184 lb
Silver medal – second place	2001 Stillwater	184 lb

YouTube information
- Channel: Daniel Cormier
- Subscribers: 497 thousand
- Views: 119 million
- Last updated: December 30, 2025

Daniel Ryan Cormier (/ˈkɒrmɪeɪ/; born March 20, 1979) is an American former professional mixed martial artist, freestyle wrestler, and current color commentator for the Ultimate Fighting Championship (UFC). As a former UFC Light Heavyweight and Heavyweight Champion, Cormier is the second fighter in UFC history to hold titles in two weight classes simultaneously and is the first fighter to have title defenses in two divisions. He is widely regarded as one of the greatest mixed martial artists of all time.

As an international wrestler, Cormier was a six-time US World or Olympic Team Member, a World bronze medalist, a World Cup runner-up, a 2003 Pan American Games gold medalist (bronze in 2007), and a two-time Pan American champion. In folkstyle wrestling, Cormier was an NCAA Division I national finalist (with loss to the eventual four-time NCAA champion Cael Sanderson from Iowa State) and two-time Big 12 Conference runner-up for the Oklahoma State Cowboys. He was also a two-time NJCAA champion.

Prior to competing in the UFC, Cormier was the Strikeforce Heavyweight Grand Prix Champion and King of the Cage Heavyweight Champion. Fight Matrix currently ranks him as the seventh-greatest light heavyweight mixed martial artist of all time, the 13th-greatest heavyweight of all time, and the 14th-greatest male fighter of all time, pound-for-pound.

== Background and wrestling career ==
Cormier was born and raised in Lafayette, Louisiana. Cormier is the son of Joseph and Audrey Cormier. He has an older brother named Joseph, a sister named Felicia, and a younger brother named Ferral. When Cormier was seven, his father was shot and killed on Thanksgiving Day in 1986 by the father of his second wife.

He attended Northside High School in Lafayette, where he won three Louisiana state championships in wrestling. After ninth grade, Cormier only lost twice, both by injury default. His final high-school record was 101–9, with 89 victories coming by fall. He was twice voted the Most Outstanding Wrestler of the state tournament. In 1995, Cormier won a bronze medal in the World Championships in Greco-Roman wrestling Cadet (15–16 years old) division. He was also an All-State football player in high school at the linebacker position and had a personal best time of 4.5 seconds in the 40-yard dash. Cormier was offered a scholarship to play football at LSU, but declined to continue pursuing wrestling.

After high school, he attended Colby Community College in Kansas, where he was a two-time junior college national champion, winning in 1998 and 1999. His record was 61–0, with 33 falls. After Colby, Cormier transferred to Division I Oklahoma State University. In 2000, Cormier went 26–5. He entered the national tournament as the No. 3 seed at 184 pounds but fell one match short of becoming an All-American (the top eight in each weight class). In 2001, Cormier went 27–5. He became an All-American and reached the national finals of the 184-pound weight class, in which he lost to Cael Sanderson 8–4. His final record was 53–10, with 27 falls. Six of Cormier's losses in college were to Cael Sanderson.

After graduating from OSU with a degree in sociology, Cormier had a successful career in freestyle wrestling. He was the senior U.S. national champion every year from 2003 to 2008 and represented team USA at the world level for each of those years. He competed at 96 kg, or 211.6 lbs. At the 2004 Olympics, he came fourth after losing to Khadzhimurat Gatsalov in the semi-finals. Cormier was also a member of the 2008 Olympic wrestling team for the USA, where he was named team captain but pulled from competition due to kidney failure from excessive weight cutting.

In the non-Olympic years, Cormier reached the top five at the Wrestling World Championships in 2003 and 2007. He won a bronze medal at the 2007 competition. Cormier also won a gold medal at the quadrennial Pan American Games in 2003. Another major accomplishment came in 2005, when Cormier became one of a select few Americans to win a gold medal at the Golden Grand-Prix Ivan Yarygin, held in Krasnoyarsk, Russia, and considered by many the most challenging wrestling tournament in the world.

Cormier also competed and represented the Oklahoma Slam team in the now-defunct Real Pro Wrestling league. He was crowned a champion in its first and only season in 2004, for the 211 lb weight class. While he competed in Real Pro Wrestling, he was teammates with fellow Strikeforce mixed martial arts competitor Muhammed Lawal, who also was a season 1 champion, in the 184 lb weight class.

Cormier became the head wrestling coach at Gilroy High School in the summer of 2018. In April 21, 2021, Cormier was inducted into the LHSAA Hall of Fame for his sporting accomplishments.

== Mixed martial arts career ==
=== Xtreme MMA ===
After the 2008 Olympics, Cormier decided to pursue a career in mixed martial arts. He trained with Cain Velasquez, Jon Fitch, and Josh Koscheck at American Kickboxing Academy. It helped him improve as a striker and submission wrestler.

After making his professional debut in September 2009, Cormier traveled to Australia and fought for Xtreme MMA. He defeated Lucas Browne to win the XMMA Heavyweight Championship on July 31, 2010. Two weeks later, Cormier won his second MMA title by winning the KOTC Heavyweight Championship from Tony Johnson.

=== Strikeforce ===
Cormier signed an eight-fight deal with the Strikeforce organization and debuted at Strikeforce Challengers: Kennedy vs. Cummings, defeating Gary Frazier by TKO.

Cormier fought at the event Strikeforce Challengers: Johnson vs. Mahe on March 26, 2010, in Fresno, California, where he defeated John Devine by KO.

Shortly thereafter, Cormier fought Strikeforce: Houston event on August 21, 2010, defeating Jason Riley via submission (punches) at 1:02 into the fight.

Cormier next fought Devin Cole at the Strikeforce Challengers: Woodley vs. Saffiedine event on January 7, 2011, in Nashville, Tennessee. He won via unanimous decision, the first time a fight of his had gone the distance.

Cormier was scheduled to face Shane del Rosario at Strikeforce: Overeem vs. Werdum on June 18, 2011, in Dallas, Texas, but his opponent was involved in a car accident and withdrew from the bout. Cormier instead faced Jeff Monson and won via decision. Cormier used his striking to dominate Monson on the feet and did not allow for any takedowns, negating Monson's submission ability.

Despite Cormier's reservations about competing in the Strikeforce Heavyweight Grand Prix due to inexperience, height and reach disadvantage over the rest of the field, he nonetheless entered, and faced Antônio Silva on only five weeks' notice on September 10, 2011, at Strikeforce: Barnett vs. Kharitonov, replacing Alistair Overeem. In a shocking upset, he won the fight via KO (punches) in the first round, catching Silva with multiple hits to the jaw, causing him to collapse, and then finishing with two hammer blows to the face of the grounded Silva before the referee could stop the fight. Cormier later revealed that he had broken his hand during the fight.

He faced fellow finalist Josh Barnett on May 19, 2012, at Strikeforce: Barnett vs. Cormier. Cormier won the five-round fight by unanimous decision (49–46, 50–45, and 50–45) and became the Strikeforce Heavyweight Grand Prix Champion. It was discovered that Cormier, once again, had broken his right hand during his bout with Barnett, and he underwent hand surgery.

Cormier was scheduled to fight former UFC Heavyweight Champion Frank Mir on November 3, 2012, at Strikeforce: Cormier vs. Mir. However, on September 19 it was revealed that Mir had been forced to pull out of the bout due to an injury.

Cormier fought Dion Staring at Strikeforce: Marquardt vs. Saffiedine on January 12, 2013. He won via TKO in the second round.

=== Ultimate Fighting Championship ===
==== Early fights ====
Cormier made his promotional debut against Frank Mir on April 20, 2013, at UFC on Fox 7. He won the fight via unanimous decision. Due to Cain Velasquez, Cormier's teammate, being the UFC heavyweight champion, Cormier considered moving down to the UFC's light heavyweight division. Some writers expressed doubt in his ability to cut down to the 205 limit safely, citing the fact that Cormier had suffered kidney failure during his time as an Olympic wrestler when trying to make 211 lbs. After failing to compete at the Olympics, he gained 40 lbs.

In his second UFC fight, Cormier faced Roy Nelson on October 19, 2013, at UFC 166. He won the fight via unanimous decision. Prior to the bout, he announced that, win or lose, he would be moving down to the light heavyweight division. Cormier weighed in for the bout more than 20 pounds lighter than previous contests, at 224 pounds.

Cormier was expected to face Rashad Evans at UFC 170 on February 22, 2014, in his first fight at light heavyweight. However, a leg injury knocked Evans off the card ten days before the event, and he was replaced by newcomer Patrick Cummins. Cormier won the fight via TKO in the first round.

Cormier was briefly linked to a bout with Rafael Cavalcante on July 5, 2014, at UFC 175. However, it was announced that Cormier would instead be fighting Dan Henderson on May 24, 2014, at UFC 173. After dominating the fight with his wrestling and top game, Cormier choked Henderson to sleep to win via technical submission in the third round.

Daniel Cormier was chosen as spokesperson for his new Cage Fighter signature wrestling shoe when he competed in an exhibition wrestling match against Chris Pendleton during the UFC Fan Expo.

==== Cormier vs. Jones ====
Cormier was expected to face UFC light heavyweight champion Jon Jones at UFC 178 on September 27, 2014, after Alexander Gustafsson was forced to withdraw due to a torn meniscus. However, on August 12, Jones, citing an injury, was forced to pull out of the bout. The fight eventually took place at UFC 182. At UFC 182 Cormier was defeated by Jon Jones via unanimous decision. Both fighters were awarded a Fight of the Night bonus.

==== Light heavyweight champion ====
Cormier was expected to face Ryan Bader on June 6, 2015, at UFC Fight Night 68. However, on April 28, 2015, it was announced that Jon Jones had been stripped of the light heavyweight championship and suspended indefinitely after facing felony charges stemming from a traffic accident in Albuquerque, New Mexico. Subsequently, Cormier was pulled from the Bader fight and replaced Jones against Anthony Johnson on May 23, 2015, at UFC 187 for the vacant title. In the opening seconds of the fight, Cormier was dropped by an overhand right by Johnson. Cormier won the next two rounds and submitted Johnson by rear-naked choke in the third round to become the new UFC light heavyweight champion. The last time the championship had changed hands was in 2011. The fight earned Cormier a Performance of the Night bonus.

Cormier faced Alexander Gustafsson on October 3, 2015, at UFC 192. Cormier won the back-and-forth fight via split decision (47–48, 48–47, and 49–46). Their performance earned both participants Fight of the Night honors.

In November 2015, Cormier stated that he had signed a new, eight-fight contract with the UFC.

A rematch with Jon Jones was expected to take place on April 23, 2016, at UFC 197. However, Cormier pulled out of the fight on April 1 citing a foot injury and was replaced by Ovince Saint Preux. The rematch with Jones was rescheduled for July 9, 2016, at UFC 200. On July 6, it was announced that the fight between Jones and Cormier was off due to a potential doping violation from Jon Jones. Cormier fought former UFC Middleweight Champion Anderson Silva in a 3-round non-title fight at the event. Cormier won the fight via unanimous decision.

A rematch with Anthony Johnson was expected to take place on December 10, 2016, at UFC 206. However, on November 25, 2016, Cormier withdrew from the bout due to injury. The pairing was rescheduled again for April 8, 2017, at UFC 210. At the weigh-in for the fight, Cormier was 1.2 pounds over the 205-pound limit for a light heavyweight championship fight: he was allowed a second weigh-in and came in at the 205 limit. Cormier won the fight via rear-naked choke submission in the second round.

==== Jon Jones rematch and controversy ====
The rematch with Jon Jones took place on July 29, 2017, at UFC 214 at the Honda Center in Anaheim, California. Jones defeated Cormier, recapturing the light heavyweight championship via knockout in the third round, after a head kick and a barrage of strikes on the ground.

In the post-fight interview, a tearful and emotional Cormier showed disappointment of the defeat and said "I guess if he wins both fights there is no rivalry." Commentator Joe Rogan issued an apology on Twitter to Cormier after the fight for interviewing him when Cormier could not gather his thoughts due to the knockout he suffered in the fight.

On August 22, it was announced that Jones had been flagged for a potential doping violation by USADA stemming from his test sample that was collected after weigh-ins on July 28. He tested positive for Oral Turinabol, an anabolic steroid. Jones was placed on a provisional suspension as a result of the positive drug test. On September 13, USADA confirmed that the "B" sample of Jones' tested positive for Turinabol. As a result, the CSAC officially changed the bout result to a no-contest and the light heavyweight championship was returned to Cormier. On September 18, Cormier, in an interview with TMZ, said he was open to a third fight with Jon Jones after Jones's suspension was served.

==== Resumed title reign ====
Cormier faced Volkan Oezdemir on January 20, 2018, at UFC 220. He defeated Oezdemir via TKO in the second round. This win earned him the Performance of the Night bonus.

==== Heavyweight champion and retirement ====
In 2018 Cormier coached opposite Stipe Miocic on season 27 of The Ultimate Fighter. Later that year, Cormier faced him for the UFC heavyweight championship on July 7, 2018, at UFC 226. He won the fight via knockout in the first round, becoming the second fighter to hold two titles simultaneously in the UFC. As of August 17, 2019, Cormier is one of four fighters to have held two UFC championships simultaneously. This fight earned him the Performance of the Night award. Provoked by Cormier after his victory, Brock Lesnar emerged from the audience and came into the octagon to accept the challenge by the new champion.

On October 9, the UFC announced that Cormier would be making the first defense of his heavyweight championship against Derrick Lewis at UFC 230; he defeated Lewis via rear-naked choke in the second round, becoming the first man to submit Lewis in MMA. This made Cormier the first UFC fighter to win and defend both the Light Heavyweight and Heavyweight belts, and the first UFC fighter successfully to defend both belts. Cormier relinquished the light heavyweight title a day before UFC 232, with his focus solely on defending the heavyweight title, stating: "I'd rather walk away this way, than have the history books say I was stripped".

Since the potential matchup with Brock Lesnar never materialised, with Lesnar instead opting to re-sign with the WWE, Cormier decided to fight Miocic again. The rematch took place on August 17, 2019, at UFC 241, just over a year since their first fight. Despite his early success, Cormier lost the fight by TKO in the fourth round, ending his reign as heavyweight champion.

The trilogy bout between Cormier and Miocic took place on August 15, 2020, at UFC 252. Cormier lost the fight by unanimous decision and announced his retirement from the sport.

==== Post-retirement career ====
On October 1, 2016, Cormier made his first appearance in the UFC color commentary team at UFC Fight Night 96 in Portland, Oregon. He has been part of the regular UFC commentary team since his sport retirement in August 2020.

In 2025, Cormier and former UFC Light Heavyweight and UFC Middleweight title challenger Chael Sonnen served as coaches for The Ultimate Fighter: Season 33.

Cormier and former UFC Middleweight champion Michael Bisping are scheduled to serve as coaches for The Ultimate Fighter: Season 34 which will air in June 2026.

Cormier co-hosts the weekly podcast Funky and the Champ with Ben Askren. He previously co-hosted DC & Helwani with Ariel Helwani, and Good Guy / Bad Guy with Chael Sonnen.

== Championships and accomplishments ==
=== Mixed martial arts ===
- Ultimate Fighting Championship
  - UFC Hall of Fame (Modern Wing, Class of 2022)
  - UFC Heavyweight Championship (One time)
    - One successful title defense
    - Tied (Jon Jones, Francis Ngannou, Tom Aspinall, Frank Mir, Junior dos Santos, and Fabrício Werdum) for seventh most title fight wins in UFC Heavyweight division history (2)
  - UFC Light Heavyweight Championship (One time)
    - Three successful title defenses
    - Fourth most title fight wins in UFC Light Heavyweight division history (4)
    - Most significant strikes landed in a UFC Light Heavyweight title fight (140)
  - Fight of the Night (Two times) vs. Jon Jones and Alexander Gustafsson
  - Performance of the Night (Three times) vs. Anthony Johnson 1, Volkan Oezdemir and Stipe Miocic 1
  - Most significant strikes landed in a UFC Heavyweight fight (181)
  - Most strikes landed per minute in UFC Heavyweight division history (5.39)
  - Fourth highest significant strike accuracy in UFC Heavyweight division history (61.6%)
  - Third lowest bottom percentage in UFC Heavyweight division history (0.41%)
  - Tied (Mick Parkin) for sixth lowest bottom position time in UFC Heavyweight division history (0:21)
  - Fifth longest average fight time in UFC Heavyweight division history (14:19)
  - Tied (Anthony Perosh, Wilson Gouveia, Phil Davis, and Ryan Spann) for tenth most submissions wins in UFC Light Heavyweight division history (3)
  - Ninth lowest bottom position percentage in UFC Light Heavyweight division history (1.32%)
  - Fifth longest average fight time in UFC Light Heavyweight division history (13:30)
  - First fighter successfully to defend titles in two weight classes
  - Fifth multi-divisional champion in UFC history
  - Second simultaneous multi-divisional champion
  - UFC.com Awards
    - 2013: Ranked #2 Import of the Year
    - 2014: Ranked #9 Submission of the Year vs. Dan Henderson
    - 2015: Ranked #5 Fighter of the Year & Ranked #2 Fight of the Year vs. Alexander Gustafsson
    - 2018: Fighter of the Year & Ranked #8 Knockout of the Year vs. Stipe Miocic 1
- Strikeforce
  - Strikeforce Heavyweight Grand Prix Champion
- King of the Cage
  - KOTC Heavyweight Championship (One time)
- Xtreme MMA
  - XMMA Heavyweight Championship (One time)
    - One successful title defense
- BJPenn.com
  - 2010s #4 Ranked Fighter of the Decade
- ESPN
  - Upset of the Month (2011) vs. Antônio Silva on September 10
  - Fighter of the Year (2018)
- Cageside Press
  - 2018 Fighter of the Year
- Combat Press
  - 2018 Male Fighter of the Year
- MMA Junkie
  - 2015 #4 Ranked Fight of the Year vs. Alexander Gustafsson at UFC 192
  - 2015 January Fight of the Month vs. Jon Jones
  - 2015 October Fight of the Month vs. Alexander Gustafsson
  - 2018 Male Fighter of the Year
  - 2010s #3 Ranked Fighter of the Decade
- MMA Fighting
  - 2018 Fighter of the Year
  - 2010s #3 Ranked Fighter of the Decade
  - #3 Ranked UFC Fighter of All Time
- Sherdog
  - 2014 Beatdown of the Year vs. Dan Henderson at UFC 173
- MMA Weekly
  - 2018 Fighter of the Year
- MMADNA.nl
  - 2018 Male Fighter of the Year.
- Wrestling Observer Newsletter
  - Feud of the Year (2014) vs. Jon Jones
  - Most Outstanding Fighter of the Year (2018)
- World MMA Awards
  - 2018 Charles 'Mask' Lewis Fighter of the Year
  - 2018 Analyst of the Year
  - 2019 – July 2020 Analyst of the Year
  - 2021 Personality of the Year
- ESPY Awards
  - 2018 Best MMA Fighter
- Bleacher Report
  - 2018 Fighter of the Year
- Bloody Elbow
  - 2018 Fighter of the Year
- Fight Matrix
  - 2018 Male Fighter of the Year
- Inside MMA
  - 2011 Breakthrough Fighter of the Year Bazzie Award
- CBS Sports
  - 2018 #2 Ranked UFC Fighter of the Year
  - 2018 #5 Ranked UFC Knockout of the Year vs. Stipe Miocic
  - 2019 #4 Ranked UFC Fight of the Year vs. Stipe Miocic
- MMA Sucka
  - 2018 Comeback Fighter of the Year

=== Freestyle wrestling ===
- United World Wrestling (FILA)
  - 2007 Wrestling World Championships Bronze Medalist
  - 2007 Pan American Games Bronze Medalist
  - 2007 Dave Schultz Memorial International Open Gold Medalist
  - 2005 Super Cup Silver Medalist
  - 2005 Wrestling World Cup Silver Medalist
  - 2005 Ivan Yarygin Memorial Tournament Senior Gold Medalist
  - 2004 Boutiatyr Grand Prix Gold Medalist
  - 2003 FILA Absolute Championship Bronze Medalist
  - 2003 Ivan Yarygin Cup Bronze Medalist
  - 2003 Pan American Games Gold Medalist
  - 2002 Medved International Championships Gold Medalist
  - 2002 Sunkist Kids/ASU International Open Gold Medalist
  - 2002 Pan American Championships Gold Medalist
  - 2002 Dave Schultz Memorial International Open Bronze Medalist
  - 2001 Sunkist Kids International Open Gold Medalist
  - 2001 Dave Schultz Memorial International Open Gold Medalist
- USA Wrestling
  - USA Senior National Championship (2003, 2004, 2005, 2006, 2007, 2008)
  - US Senior World Team Trials Winner (2005, 2006, 2007)
  - Northwest Senior Regional Championship (2008)
  - John Smith Freestyle Wrestler of the Year Award (2007)
- George Tragos/Lou Thesz Professional Wrestling Hall of Fame
  - George Tragos Award (2019)

=== Greco-Roman wrestling ===
- United World Wrestling (FILA)
  - 1995 Cadet World Championships Bronze Medalist

=== Folkstyle wrestling ===
- National Collegiate Athletic Association
  - NCAA Division I 184 lb National Runner-up out of Oklahoma State University (2001)
  - NCAA Division I All-American out of Oklahoma State University (2001)
- Big 12 Conference
  - Big 12 184 lb National Runner-up out of Oklahoma State University (2000, 2001)
- National Junior College Athletic Association
  - NJCAA Wrestling Hall of Fame Inductee (2009)
  - NJCAA Collegiate National Championship (1998, 1999)
  - NJCAA All-American (1998, 1999)
- National High School Coaches Association
  - NHSCA Senior All-American (1997)
- Louisiana High School Athletic Association
  - LHSAA Hall of Fame – Class of 2021
  - LHSAA Division I High School State Championship (1995, 1996, 1997)
  - LHSAA Division I All-State (1995, 1996, 1997)
  - ASICS Tiger High School All-American (1996, 1997)
- Louisiana Sports Hall of Fame – Class of 2024

== Personal life ==
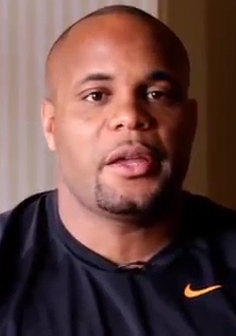
Cormier in 2015

Cormier and a former girlfriend had one daughter who died in a car accident on June 14, 2003. He was previously married to a woman named Robin.

Cormier resides in Gilroy, California where he is heavily involved in the local wrestling community. He serves as the head coach of the Gilroy High School wrestling team and opened up his own wrestling academy in 2021.

On February 16, 2011, he and his then-fiancée Salina Deleon had a son, Daniel Jr. Daniel Jr. trains in amateur wrestling at AKA, where Cormier is the assistant coach. On March 4, 2012, Cormier and his fiancée had a daughter. In June 2017, Cormier and Deleon were married.

Cormier is a dedicated fan of the New Orleans Saints and professional wrestling.

On March 5, 2022, Cormier was absent from the commentary team for UFC 272 to attend his mother's funeral. His family is Catholic.

On June 14, 2026, Cormier posted a screenshot of his interaction with Eric Trump on X, which appeared to show Eric Trump asking for insider information about the UFC Freedom 250 fight. Eric Trump later responded: "We are aware of the fake, AI generated screenshots being circulated online. I have never spoken to Daniel. He has since deleted his post, which confirms it was clearly fabricated." Cormier later denied the interaction took place, claiming that his account had been "hacked or something".

== Media appearances ==
Cormier made his film debut in 2014, playing himself in the 2014 comedy Mantervention.

In February 2015, Cormier starred in the video clip All About That Cake, a parody of All About That Bass, to promote the 2015 World MMA Awards.

In January 2018, he was featured on an episode of Sneaker Shopping on the YouTube channel Complex.

In February 2019 he featured in "Sub-Zero's Head Shatter", the first episode of the YouTube series "The Science of Mortal Kombat" by Because Science.

On October 8, 2022, Cormier was the special guest referee in the MMA inspired Fight Pit match between Seth Rollins and Matt Riddle at WWE Extreme Rules 2022.

== Mixed martial arts record ==
Professional record breakdown
26 matches	22 wins	3 losses
By knockout	10	1
By submission	5	0
By decision	7	2
No contests	1	

Res.	Record	Opponent	Method	Event	Date	Round	Time	Location	Notes
Loss	22–3 (1)	Stipe Miocic	Decision (unanimous)	UFC 252	August 15, 2020	5	5:00	Las Vegas, Nevada, United States	For the UFC Heavyweight Championship.
Loss	22–2 (1)	Stipe Miocic	TKO (punches)	UFC 241	August 17, 2019	4	4:09	Anaheim, California, United States	Lost the UFC Heavyweight Championship.
Win	22–1 (1)	Derrick Lewis	Submission (rear-naked choke)	UFC 230	November 3, 2018	2	2:14	New York City, New York, United States	Defended the UFC Heavyweight Championship.
Win	21–1 (1)	Stipe Miocic	KO (punches)	UFC 226	July 7, 2018	1	4:33	Las Vegas, Nevada, United States	Return to Heavyweight. Won the UFC Heavyweight Championship. Performance of the Night.
Win	20–1 (1)	Volkan Oezdemir	TKO (punches)	UFC 220	January 20, 2018	2	2:00	Boston, Massachusetts, United States	Defended the UFC Light Heavyweight Championship. Performance of the Night. Later vacated the title.
NC	19–1 (1)	Jon Jones	NC (overturned by CSAC)	UFC 214	July 29, 2017	3	3:01	Anaheim, California, United States	Retained the UFC Light Heavyweight Championship. Originally a KO (head kick and punches) win for Jones; overturned after he tested positive for a turinabol metabolite. Cormier was subsequently reinstated as champion.
Win	19–1	Anthony Johnson	Submission (rear-naked choke)	UFC 210	April 8, 2017	2	3:37	Buffalo, New York, United States	Defended the UFC Light Heavyweight Championship.
Win	18–1	Anderson Silva	Decision (unanimous)	UFC 200	July 9, 2016	3	5:00	Las Vegas, Nevada, United States	Non-title bout.
Win	17–1	Alexander Gustafsson	Decision (split)	UFC 192	October 3, 2015	5	5:00	Houston, Texas, United States	Defended the UFC Light Heavyweight Championship. Fight of the Night.
Win	16–1	Anthony Johnson	Submission (rear-naked choke)	UFC 187	May 23, 2015	3	2:39	Las Vegas, Nevada, United States	Won the vacant UFC Light Heavyweight Championship. Performance of the Night.
Loss	15–1	Jon Jones	Decision (unanimous)	UFC 182	January 3, 2015	5	5:00	Las Vegas, Nevada, United States	For the UFC Light Heavyweight Championship. Fight of the Night.
Win	15–0	Dan Henderson	Technical Submission (rear-naked choke)	UFC 173	May 24, 2014	3	3:53	Las Vegas, Nevada, United States	
Win	14–0	Patrick Cummins	TKO (punches)	UFC 170	February 22, 2014	1	1:19	Las Vegas, Nevada, United States	Light Heavyweight debut.
Win	13–0	Roy Nelson	Decision (unanimous)	UFC 166	October 19, 2013	3	5:00	Houston, Texas, United States	
Win	12–0	Frank Mir	Decision (unanimous)	UFC on Fox: Henderson vs. Melendez	April 20, 2013	3	5:00	San Jose, California, United States	
Win	11–0	Dion Staring	TKO (punches)	Strikeforce: Marquardt vs. Saffiedine	January 12, 2013	2	4:02	Oklahoma City, Oklahoma, United States	
Win	10–0	Josh Barnett	Decision (unanimous)	Strikeforce: Barnett vs. Cormier	May 19, 2012	5	5:00	San Jose, California, United States	Won the Strikeforce Heavyweight Grand Prix Tournament.
Win	9–0	Antônio Silva	KO (punches)	Strikeforce: Barnett vs. Kharitonov	September 10, 2011	1	3:56	Cincinnati, Ohio, United States	Strikeforce Heavyweight Grand Prix Semi-Final.
Win	8–0	Jeff Monson	Decision (unanimous)	Strikeforce: Overeem vs. Werdum	June 18, 2011	3	5:00	Dallas, Texas, United States	Strikeforce Heavyweight Grand Prix reserve bout.
Win	7–0	Devin Cole	Decision (unanimous)	Strikeforce Challengers: Woodley vs. Saffiedine	January 7, 2011	3	5:00	Nashville, Tennessee, United States	
Win	6–0	Soa Palelei	TKO (submission to punches)	Xtreme MMA 3	November 5, 2010	1	2:23	Sydney, Australia	Defended the XMMA Heavyweight Championship.
Win	5–0	Jason Riley	TKO (submission to punches)	Strikeforce: Houston	August 21, 2010	1	1:02	Houston, Texas, United States	
Win	4–0	Tony Johnson	Submission (rear-naked choke)	KOTC: Imminent Danger	August 13, 2010	1	2:27	Mescalero, New Mexico, United States	Won the KOTC Heavyweight Championship.
Win	3–0	Lucas Browne	TKO (punches)	Xtreme MMA 2	July 31, 2010	1	4:35	Sydney, Australia	Won the XMMA Heavyweight Championship.
Win	2–0	John Devine	KO (punch)	Strikeforce Challengers: Johnson vs. Mahe	March 26, 2010	1	1:19	Fresno, California, United States	
Win	1–0	Gary Frazier	TKO (punches)	Strikeforce Challengers: Kennedy vs. Cummings	September 25, 2009	2	3:39	Bixby, Oklahoma, United States	Heavyweight debut.

== Freestyle record ==
Senior Freestyle Results
Res.	Record	Opponent	Score	Date	Event	Location
Win	40–6	(United States) Chris Pendleton	12–5	July 5, 2014	UFC Fan Expo	(United States) Las Vegas, Nevada
2008 US Olympic Team Trials (gold) at 96 kg
Win	39–6	(United States) Damion Hahn	1–0, 1–0	June 15, 2008	2008 US Olympic Team Trials	(United States) Las Vegas, Nevada
Win	38–6	(United States) Damion Hahn	6–1, 6–0	June 15, 2008	2008 US Olympic Team Trials	(United States) Las Vegas, Nevada
2008 US Nationals (gold) at 96 kg
Win	37–6	(United States) Nik Fekete	7–0, 2–0	April 26, 2008	2008 US Senior National Wrestling Championships	(United States) Las Vegas, Nevada
Win	36–6	(United States) Max Askren	5–0, 7–0	April 26, 2008	2008 US Senior National Wrestling Championships	(United States) Las Vegas, Nevada
Win	35–6	(United States) Willie Parks	1–0, 1–0	April 26, 2008	2008 US Senior National Wrestling Championships	(United States) Las Vegas, Nevada
Win	34–6	(United States) Nick Preston	5–0, 1–0	April 26, 2008	2008 US Senior National Wrestling Championships	(United States) Las Vegas, Nevada
2008 Northwest Championships (gold) at 120 kg
Win	33–6	(United States) Les Sigman	6–0, 2–0	March 30, 2008	2008 Northwest Senior Freestyle Championships	Washington, United States
Win	32–6	(United States) K.C. Walsh	7–0, 1–0	March 30, 2008	2008 Northwest Senior Freestyle Championships	Washington, United States
Win	31–6	(United States) Clayton Jack	Fall	March 30, 2008	2008 Northwest Senior Freestyle Championships	Washington, United States
2007 World Championships (bronze) at 96 kg
Win	30–6	(Kyrgyzstan) Aleksey Krupnyakov	1–0, 0–1, 1–0	September 19, 2007	2007 World Wrestling Championships	Baku, Azerbaijan
Win	29–6	(Japan) Kiyotaka Kodaira	3–0, 6–0	September 19, 2007	2007 World Wrestling Championships	Baku, Azerbaijan
Loss	28–6	(Iran) Saeid Ebrahimi	0–5, 1–2	September 19, 2007	2007 World Wrestling Championships	Baku, Azerbaijan
Win	28–5	(Belarus) Ruslan Sheikhau	0–1, 1–0, 3–0	September 19, 2007	2007 World Wrestling Championships	Baku, Azerbaijan
Win	27–5	(Australia) Ian Wardell	Tech. Fall	September 19, 2007	2007 World Wrestling Championships	Baku, Azerbaijan
2007 US World Team Trials (gold) at 96 kg
Win	26–5	(United States) Muhammed Lawal	1–0, 1–0	June 11, 2007	2007 US World Team Trials	(United States) Las Vegas, Nevada
Win	25–5	(United States) Muhammed Lawal	2–1, 1–0	June 11, 2007	2007 US World Team Trials	(United States) Las Vegas, Nevada
2007 US Nationals (gold) at 96 kg
Win	24–5	(United States) Muhammed Lawal	1–0, 1–0	April 7, 2007	2007 US Senior National Wrestling Championships	(United States) Las Vegas, Nevada
Win	23–5	(United States) Kyle Cerminara	4–0, 5–0	April 7, 2007	2007 US Senior National Wrestling Championships	(United States) Las Vegas, Nevada
Win	22–5	(United States) Israel Silva	Fall	April 7, 2007	2007 US Senior National Wrestling Championships	(United States) Las Vegas, Nevada
2007 Dave Schultz Memorial (gold) at 120 kg
Win	21–5	(United States) Steve Mocco	0–1, 4–3, 1–0	February 10, 2007	2007 Dave Schultz Memorial International	(United States) Colorado Springs, Colorado
Win	20–5	(United States) Tommy Rowlands	2–0, 2–0	February 10, 2007	2007 Dave Schultz Memorial International	(United States) Colorado Springs, Colorado
Win	19–5	(United States) Pat Cummins	3–0, 4–0	February 10, 2007	2007 Dave Schultz Memorial International	(United States) Colorado Springs, Colorado
Win	18–5	(Japan) Arakida Nobuyoshi	Fall	February 10, 2007	2007 Dave Schultz Memorial International	(United States) Colorado Springs, Colorado
2006 World Championships 21st at 96 kg
Loss	17–5	(Iran) Alireza Heidari	0–2, 1–0, 0–7	September 27, 2006	2006 World Wrestling Championships	Guangzhou, China
2006 US World Team Trials (gold) at 96 kg
Win	17–4	(United States) Damion Hahn	4–0, 4–0	May 28, 2006	2006 US World Team Trials	Iowa, United States
Win	16–4	(United States) Damion Hahn	4–0, 4–0	May 28, 2006	2006 US World Team Trials	Iowa, United States
2006 US Nationals (gold) at 96 kg
Win	15–4	(United States) Nik Fekete	3–0, 5–0	April 15, 2006	2006 US Senior National Wrestling Championships	(United States) Las Vegas, Nevada
Win	14–4	(United States) Damion Hahn	3–0, 2–0	April 15, 2006	2006 US Senior National Wrestling Championships	(United States) Las Vegas, Nevada
Win	13–4	(United States) Kyle Cerminara	Fall	April 15, 2006	2006 US Senior National Wrestling Championships	(United States) Las Vegas, Nevada
Win	12–4	(United States) Raphael Davis	6–0, 2–0	April 15, 2006	2006 US Senior National Wrestling Championships	(United States) Las Vegas, Nevada
2005 World Championships 11th at 96 kg
Loss	11–4	(Kyrgyzstan) Aleksey Krupnyakov	1–2, 1–8	September 26, 2005	2005 World Wrestling Championships	Budapest, Hungary
Win	11–3	(Slovakia) Peter Pecha	4–0, 3–0	September 26, 2005	2005 World Wrestling Championships	Budapest, Hungary
2005 US Nationals (gold) at 96 kg
Win	10–3	(United States) Tommy Rowlands	1–0, 2–0	???, 2005	2005 US Senior National Wrestling Championships	(United States) Las Vegas, Nevada
Win	9–3	(United States) Nick Preston	0–1, 3–0, 6–1	???, 2005	2005 US Senior National Wrestling Championships	(United States) Las Vegas, Nevada
Win	8–3	(United States) Andrew Adams	7–1, 7–1	???, 2005	2005 US Senior National Wrestling Championships	(United States) Las Vegas, Nevada
2004 Summer Olympics 4th at 96 kg
Loss	7–3	(Iran) Alireza Heidari	2–3	August 26, 2004	2004 Summer Olympics	Athens, Greece
Loss	7–2	(Russia) Khadzhimurat Gatsalov	0–5	August 26, 2004	2004 Summer Olympics	Athens, Greece
Win	7–1	(Poland) Bartlomiej Bartnicki	10–1	August 26, 2004	2004 Summer Olympics	Athens, Greece
Win	6–1	(Austria) Radovan Valach	9–0	August 26, 2004	2004 Summer Olympics	Athens, Greece
2004 US Olympic Team Trials (gold) at 96 kg
Win	5–1	(United States) Tim Hartung	7–0	May 21, 2004	2004 US Olympic Team Trials	(United States) Indianapolis, Indiana
Win	4–1	(United States) Tim Hartung	Fall	May 21, 2004	2004 US Olympic Team Trials	(United States) Indianapolis, Indiana
2003 World Championships 5th at 96 kg
Loss	3–1	(Iran) Alireza Heidari	3–6	September 12, 2003	2003 World Championships	(United States) Manhattan, New York
Win	3–0	(Brazil) Antoine Jaoude	Fall	September 12, 2003	2003 World Championships	(United States) Manhattan, New York
Win	2–0	(Lithuania) Ricardas Pauliukonis	Tech Fall	September 12, 2003	2003 World Championships	(United States) Manhattan, New York
Win	1–0	(Turkey) Hakan Koc	9–3	September 12, 2003	2003 World Championships	(United States) Manhattan, New York

== NCAA record ==
NCAA Championships Matches
Res.	Record	Opponent	Score	Date	Event
2001 NCAA Championships (silver) at 184 lbs
Loss	6–3	Cael Sanderson	4–8	March 15–17, 2001	2001 NCAA Division I Wrestling Championships
Win	6–2	Andy Hrovat	TB 3–1	March 15–17, 2001	2001 NCAA Division I Wrestling Championships
Win	5–2	Josh Lambrecht	MD 16–4	March 15–17, 2001	2001 NCAA Division I Wrestling Championships
Win	4–2	Jake Stork	TF 22–7	March 15–17, 2001	2001 NCAA Division I Wrestling Championships
Win	3–2	R.D Pursell	Fall	March 15–17, 2001	2001 NCAA Division I Wrestling Championships
2000 NCAA Championships at 184 lbs
Loss	1–2	Cash Edwards	10–15	March 16–18, 2000	2000 NCAA Division I Wrestling Championships
Loss	1–1	Doug Lee	4–6	March 16–18, 2000	2000 NCAA Division I Wrestling Championships
Win	1–0	Zach Breitenbach	16–9	March 16–18, 2000	2000 NCAA Division I Wrestling Championships

== Pay-per-view bouts ==
No.	Event	Fight	Date	Venue	City	PPV Buys
1.	UFC 182	Jones vs. Cormier	January 3, 2015	MGM Grand Garden Arena	Las Vegas, Nevada, U.S.	800,000
2.	UFC 187	Johnson vs. Cormier	May 23, 2015	MGM Grand Garden Arena	Las Vegas, Nevada, U.S.	375,000
3.	UFC 192	Cormier vs. Gustafsson	October 3, 2015	Toyota Center	Houston, Texas, U.S.	250,000
4.	UFC 210	Cormier vs. Johnson 2	April 8, 2017	KeyBank Center	Buffalo, New York, U.S	300,000
5.	UFC 214	Cormier vs. Jones 2	July 29, 2017	Honda Center	Anaheim, California, U.S.	860,000
6.	UFC 226	Miocic vs. Cormier	July 7, 2018	T-Mobile Arena	Las Vegas, Nevada, U.S.	380,000
7.	UFC 230	Cormier vs. Lewis	November 3, 2018	Madison Square Garden	New York City, New York, U.S.	250,000
8.	UFC 241	Cormier vs. Miocic 2	August 17, 2019	Honda Center	Anaheim, California, U.S	Not Disclosed
9.	UFC 252	Miocic vs. Cormier 3	August 15, 2020	UFC Apex	Las Vegas, Nevada, U.S.	500,000
Total sales						3,715,000

== See also ==
- List of current UFC fighters
- List of Strikeforce alumni
- List of male mixed martial artists
- List of UFC champions
- List of UFC bonus award recipients
- Double champions in MMA
- UFC Hall of Fame

Achievements
Vacant Title last held by Jon Jones	13th UFC Light Heavyweight Champion; May 23, 2015 – December 28, 2018; Vacated title 174 days after winning the heavyweight title.	Vacant Title next held by Jon Jones
Preceded by Stipe Miocic	20th UFC Heavyweight Champion; July 7, 2018 – August 17, 2019	Succeeded by Stipe Miocic
Awards
Preceded by Max Holloway	World MMA Fighter of the Year; 2018	Succeeded by Israel Adesanya
Best Fighter ESPY Award bifurcated	Best MMA Fighter ESPY Award; 2019	Vacant Title next held by Khabib Nurmagomedov
