= Wrestling at the 2008 Summer Olympics – Men's freestyle 96 kg =

Men's freestyle 96 kg at the Games of the XXIX Olympiad
- Venue: China Agricultural University Gymnasium
- Date: 21 August 2008
- Competitors: 19 from 19 nations

Medalists
1st place, gold medalist(s)		Shirvani Muradov	Russia
2nd place, silver medalist(s)		Giorgi Gogshelidze	Georgia
3rd place, bronze medalist(s)		Michel Batista	Cuba
3rd place, bronze medalist(s)		Khetag Gazyumov	Azerbaijan

Men's freestyle 96 kilograms competition at the 2008 Summer Olympics in Beijing, China, took place on 21 August at the China Agricultural University Gymnasium.

This freestyle wrestling competition consists of a single-elimination tournament, with a repechage used to determine the winner of two bronze medals. The two finalists face off for gold and silver medals. Each wrestler who loses to one of the two finalists moves into the repechage, culminating in a pair of bronze medal matches featuring the semifinal losers each facing the remaining repechage opponent from their half of the bracket.

Each bout consists of up to three rounds, lasting two minutes apiece. The wrestler who scores more points in each round is the winner of that rounds; the bout ends when one wrestler has won two rounds (and thus the match).

== Schedule ==
All times are China Standard Time (UTC+08:00)

Date	Time	Event
21 August 2008	09:30	Qualification rounds
21 August 2008	16:00	Repechage
21 August 2008	17:00	Finals

== Results ==
Legend

- F — Won by fall
- WO — Won by walkover

=== Final ===
Final
Taimuraz Tigiyev (KAZ)	0	0
Shirvani Muradov (RUS)	1	1

=== Top half ===
Qualifications

1/8 finals
Saleh Emara (EGY)	3	2
Saeid Ebrahimi (IRI)	4	2
Aleksey Krupnyakov (KGZ)	0	0
Giorgi Gogshelidze (GEO)	1	1
Luis Vivenes (VEN)	0	0
Taimuraz Tigiyev (KAZ)	6	3
Michel Batista (CUB)	W	O
Daniel Cormier (USA)

Quarterfinals
Saeid Ebrahimi (IRI)	0	0
Giorgi Gogshelidze (GEO)	3	1
Taimuraz Tigiyev (KAZ)	2	1
Michel Batista (CUB)	0	0

Semifinals
Giorgi Gogshelidze (GEO)	1	1	0
Taimuraz Tigiyev (KAZ)	1	0	2

=== Bottom half ===
Qualifications
Khetag Gazyumov (AZE)	3	3
Mateusz Gucman (POL)	0	0
Kurban Kurbanov (UZB)	3	1
David Zilberman (CAN)	1	0
Gergely Kiss (HUN)	5	5
Nicolae Ceban (MDA)	3	0

1/8 finals
Stefan Kehrer (GER)	0	1
Hakan Koç (TUR)	1	1
Georgii Tibilov (UKR)	1	0	0
Shirvani Muradov (RUS)	0	1	1
Vincent Aka-Akesse (FRA)	0	0
Khetag Gazyumov (AZE)	4	4
Kurban Kurbanov (UZB)	1	3	5
Gergely Kiss (HUN)	1	0	4

Quarterfinals
Hakan Koç (TUR)	0	0
Shirvani Muradov (RUS)	1	2
Khetag Gazyumov (AZE)	4	6
Kurban Kurbanov (UZB)	0	0

Semifinals
Shirvani Muradov (RUS)	0	2	1
Khetag Gazyumov (AZE)	1	0	0

=== Repechage ===
Repechage round 2
Luis Vivenes (VEN)	1	0
Michel Batista (CUB)	1	2
Georgii Tibilov (UKR)	1	3
Hakan Koç (TUR)	0	1

Bronze medals
Michel Batista (CUB)	0	0
Giorgi Gogshelidze (GEO)	1	4^{F}
Georgii Tibilov (UKR)	0	0
Khetag Gazyumov (AZE)	5	2

== Final standing ==
Rank	Athlete
1st place, gold medalist(s)	Shirvani Muradov (RUS)
2nd place, silver medalist(s)	Giorgi Gogshelidze (GEO)
3rd place, bronze medalist(s)	Michel Batista (CUB)
3rd place, bronze medalist(s)	Khetag Gazyumov (AZE)
5	Georgii Tibilov (UKR)
6	Kurban Kurbanov (UZB)
7	Gergely Kiss (HUN)
8	Hakan Koç (TUR)
9	Saeid Ebrahimi (IRI)
10	Saleh Emara (EGY)
11	Nicolae Ceban (MDA)
12	Stefan Kehrer (GER)
13	David Zilberman (CAN)
14	Luis Vivenes (VEN)
15	Aleksey Krupnyakov (KGZ)
16	Mateusz Gucman (POL)
17	Vincent Aka-Akesse (FRA)
18	Daniel Cormier (USA)
DQ	Taimuraz Tigiyev (KAZ)

- Taimuraz Tigiyev of Kazakhstan originally won the silver medal, but in November 2016, it was announced that he tested positive for Chlorodehydromethyltestosterone.
