= 2003 World Junior Wrestling Championships =

Junior Wrestling Championships

- Host city: Istanbul, Turkey
- Dates: 25–31 August 2003

Champions
- Freestyle: Russia
- Greco-Roman: Turkey
- Women: China

The 2003 World Junior Wrestling Championships were the 28th edition of the World Junior Wrestling Championships and were held in Istanbul, Turkey between 25 and 31 August 2003.

== Medal table ==
Rank	Nation	Gold	Silver	Bronze	Total
1	Russia	7	2	4	13
2	Iran	3	2	1	6
3	Turkey	3	0	3	6
4	China	2	3	0	5
5	Georgia	1	2	1	4
5	Kazakhstan	1	2	1	4
7	Cuba	1	1	0	2
7	South Korea	1	1	0	2
9	Ukraine	1	0	2	3
10	United States	1	0	1	2
11	Azerbaijan	1	0	0	1
11	Japan	1	0	0	1
11	Uzbekistan	1	0	0	1
14	Germany	0	3	1	4
15	Bulgaria	0	2	1	3
16	Hungary	0	1	2	3
17	Canada	0	1	1	2
18	Armenia	0	1	0	1
18	Lithuania	0	1	0	1
18	Romania	0	1	0	1
18	Serbia and Montenegro	0	1	0	1
22	Poland	0	0	3	3
23	India	0	0	1	1
23	Kyrgyzstan	0	0	1	1
23	Switzerland	0	0	1	1
Totals (25 entries)		24	24	24	72

== Medal summary ==
=== Men's freestyle ===
Event	Gold	Silver	Bronze
50 kg	Farzan Bahrami; Iran	Zhassulan Mukhtarbekuly; Kazakhstan	Maxim Petrov; Bulgaria
55 kg	Ersin Çetin; Turkey	Adam Batirov; Russia	Yury Holub; Ukraine
60 kg	Makhach Murtazaliev; Russia	Meiromzhan Beisebaev; Kazakhstan	George Woeller; Hungary
66 kg	Geandry Garzón; Cuba	Suren Markosyan; Armenia	Niranjan Singh; India
74 kg	Sergey Vitkovski; Russia	Meisam Amini; Iran	Gábor Hatos; Hungary
84 kg	Georgii Tibilov; Russia	Steffen Hartan; Germany	Yumagali Mamutov; Kazakhstan
96 kg	Magomed Ibragimov; Uzbekistan	Mohammad Khaleghi Far; Iran	Muhammet Sait Bingöl; Turkey
120 kg	Mohammad Pouralijan; Iran	Rareş Chintoan; Romania	Tamerlan Piliev; Russia

=== Greco-Roman ===
Event	Gold	Silver	Bronze
50 kg	Rovshan Bayramov; Azerbaijan	Youn-Min Yoon; South Korea	Halil İbrahim Erciyas; Turkey
55 kg	Hamid Bavafa; Iran	Jagniel Hernandez; Cuba	David Bedinadze; Georgia
60 kg	Nurbakyt Tengizbayev; Kazakhstan	Davor Štefanek; Serbia and Montenegro	Saber Darzi; Iran
66 kg	Şeref Tüfenk; Turkey	Valdemaras Venckaitis; Lithuania	Magomed Magomedov; Russia
74 kg	Jin-Sung Park; South Korea	Otari Phevadze; Georgia	İlker Genel; Turkey
84 kg	Denis Forov; Russia	Balázs Kiss; Hungary	Kenyeev Yanarbek; Kyrgyzstan
96 kg	Ramaz Nozadze; Georgia	Anatoly Makeev; Russia	Mikhail Nikolayev; Ukraine
120 kg	Yavuz Güvendi; Turkey	Revaz Chelidze; Georgia	Kokoev Vladislav; Russia

=== Women's freestyle ===
Event	Gold	Silver	Bronze
44 kg	Lyudmyla Balushka; Ukraine	Sigrun Dobner; Germany	Yan Hong Zhang; China
48 kg	Lorisa Oorzhak; Russia	Jing Jing Chen; China	Mary Kelly; United States
51 kg	Sachiko Akasaka; Japan	Sarah White; Canada	Nadine Tokar; Switzerland
55 kg	Zhihui Yan; China	Jessica Bechtel; Germany	Sylwia Bileńsk; Poland
59 kg	Maria Smolyakova; Russia	Jiao Yuanyuan; China	Julia Weiss; Germany
63 kg	Anna Polovneva; Russia	Kyi Chong; China	Emila Drzewinska; Poland
67 kg	Ali Bernard; United States	Maya Hristova; Bulgaria	Ashlea McManus; Canada
72 kg	Yanfang Li; China	Stanka Zlateva; Bulgaria	Anna Wawrzycka; Poland
