= Alexandros Laliotis =

Greek wrestler

Personal information
- Full name: Alexandros Laliotis
- Nationality: Greece
- Born: 10 September 1972 (age 53) Serres, Central Macedonia, Greece
- Height: 1.77 m (5 ft 9 1/2 in)
- Weight: 96 kg (212 lb)

Sport
- Style: Freestyle
- Club: Iraklis Wrestling Club
- Coach: Panagiotis Koutsopakis

Alexandros Laliotis (Greek: Αλέξανδρος Λαλιώτης; born September 10, 1972) is a retired Greek freestyle wrestler who competed in the men's heavyweight category. Laliotis represented Greece at the 2004 Summer Olympics in Athens and trained at Iraklis Wrestling Club in Thessaloniki under his coach Panagiotis Koutsopakis.

Laliotis qualified for the men's heavyweight class (96 kg) at the 2004 Summer Olympics in Athens. Greece received an automatic berth as the host nation. In front of the home crowd at Ano Liossia Olympic Hall, Laliotis secured a victory over China's Wang Yuanyuan with a tough 3–2 verdict in the prelim pool but lost in overtime of his next match 1–4 to Slovakia's Peter Pecha. Finishing third in the pool based on technical points and thirteenth overall, Laliotis did not advance to the medal rounds.
