= Wrestling at the 2002 Commonwealth Games =

- Venue: GMEX
- Location: Manchester, England
- Dates: 2 to 4 August 2002

Wrestling at the 2002 Commonwealth Games was the 15th appearance of Wrestling at the Commonwealth Games, returning after being left out the 1998 Commonwealth Games. The events were held in Manchester, England, from 25 July to 4 August 2002 and competition featured contests in seven weight classes.

The events took place in the GMEX.

Canada topped the wrestling medal table by virtue of winning four gold medals.

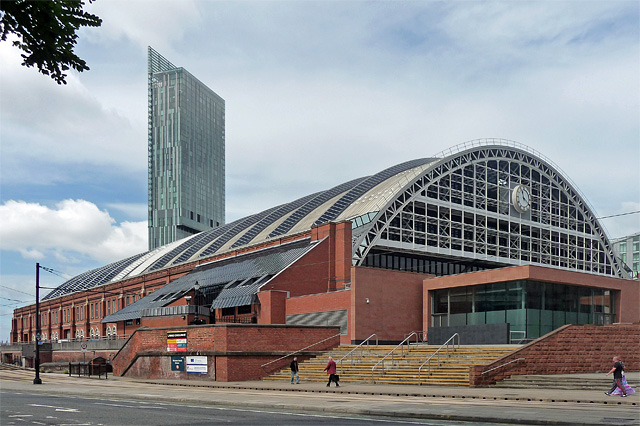
The GMEX centre in 2011

== Medal table ==
* Host nation (England)

Rank	Nation	Gold	Silver	Bronze	Total
1	Canada	4	3	0	7
2	India	3	3	0	6
3	Nigeria	0	1	3	4
4	Australia	0	0	2	2
5	Pakistan	0	0	1	1
5	South Africa	0	0	1	1
Totals (6 entries)		7	7	7	21

== Medallists ==
Event	Gold	Silver	Bronze
55 kg	Krishan Kumar; India	Mikheil Japaridze; Canada	Shaun Williams; South Africa
60 kg	Guivi Sissaouri; Canada	Shokinder Tomar; India	Tebe Dorgu; Nigeria
66 kg	Ramesh Kumar; India	Graham Neal Ewers; Canada	Fred Jessey; Nigeria
74 kg	Daniel Igali; Canada	Sunday Opiah; Nigeria	Rein Ozoline; Australia
84 kg	Nicholas Ugoalah; Canada	Anuj Chaudhary; India	Sinivie Boltic; Nigeria
96 kg	Dean Schmeichel; Canada	Anil Kumar Mann; India	Bashir Bhola Bhala; Pakistan
120 kg	Palwinder Singh Cheema; India	Eric Ronald Kirschner; Canada	Mushtaq Rasem Abdullah; Australia

== Results ==
+Victor Kodei was stripped of the silver medal in the 96kg category after failing a drugs test.

=== 55 kg ===
Round	Winner	Loser
Pool 1	Krishan Kumar (IND)	Shaun Williams (RSA)
Pool 1	Krishan Kumar (IND)	Johannes Homateni (NAM)
Pool 1	Shaun Williams (RSA)	Johannes Homaten (NAM)
Pool 1	Shaun Williams (RSA)	Farshad Tarash (AUS)
Pool 1	Krishan Kumar (IND)	Farshad Tarash (AUS)
Pool 1	Tarshad Tarash (AUS)	Johannes Homaten (NAM)
Pool 2	Mikheil Japaridze (CAN)	Andy Hutchinson (ENG)
Pool 2	Jacob Isaac (NGR)	Martin Liddle (NZL)
Pool 2	Mikheil Japaridze (CAN)	Martin Liddle (NZL)
Pool 2	Jacob Isaac (NGR)	Andy Hutchinson (ENG)
Pool 2	Andy Hutchinson (ENG)	Martin Liddle (NZL)
Pool 2	Mikheil Japaridze (CAN)	Jacob Isaac (CAN)
Bronze	Shaun Williams (RSA)	Jacob Isaac (NGR)
Gold	Krishan Kumar (IND)	Mikheil Japaridze (CAN)

=== 60 kg ===
Round	Winner	Loser
Pool 1	Cory Leigh O'Brien (AUS)	Rudolf Vaessler (NAM)
Pool 1	Shokinder Tomar (IND)	Rudolf Vaessler (NAM)
Pool 1	Cory Leigh O'Brien (AUS)	Paul Stridgeon (ENG)
Pool 1	Shokinder Tomar (IND)	Cory Leigh O'Brien (AUS)
Pool 2	Guivi Sissaouri (CAN)	Iutana Iutana (SAM)
Pool 2	Jesmond Giordimaina (MLT)	Iutana Iutana (SAM)
Pool 2	Guivi Sissaouri (CAN)	Tebe Dorgu (NGR)
Pool 2	Tebe Dorgu (NGR)	Iutana Iutana (SAM)
Bronze	Tebe Dorgu (NGR)	Cory Leigh O'Brien (AUS)
Gold	Guivi Sissaouri (CAN)	Shokinder Tomar (IND)

=== 66 kg ===
Round	Winner	Loser
Pool 1	Fred Jessey (NGR)	Graham Ewers (CAN)
Pool 1	Graham Ewers (CAN)	John Melling (ENG)
Pool 1	Fred Jessey (NGR)	John Melling (ENG)
Pool 2	Ramesh Kumar (IND)	Eric Ciake (CMR)
Pool 2	Eric Ciake (CMR)	Kenny Devoy (SCO)
Pool 2	Kenny Devoy (SCO)	Katea Ueresi (SLB)
Pool 2	Eric Ciake (CMR)	Katea Ueresi (SLB)
Pool 2	Ramesh Kumar (IND)	Katea Ueresi (SLB)
Pool 2	Ramesh Kumar (IND)	Kenny Devoy (SCO)
Pool 3	Leonid Zaslavsky (AUS)	Nicos Tziouvas (CYP)
Pool 3	Leonid Zaslavsky (AUS)	Stephan Le Roux (NAM)
Pool 3	Nicos Tziouva (CYP)	Stephan Le Roux (NAM)
Pool 3	Ricardo Aryan (NZL)	Leonid Zaslavsky (AUS)
Pool 3	Ricardo Aryan (NZL)	Nicos Tziouvas (CYP)
semi final	Ramesh Kumar (IND)	Fred Jessey (NGR)
semi final	Graham Ewers (CAN)	Ricardo Aryan (NZL)
Bronze	Fred Jessey (NGR)	Ricardo Aryan (NZL)
Gold	Ramesh Kumar (IND)	Graham Ewers (CAN)

=== 74 kg ===
Round	Winner	Loser
Pool 1	Steven McKeown (SCO)	Eric Walucho (KEN)
Pool 1	Rein Ozoline (AUS)	Steven McKeown (SCO)
Pool 1	Rein Ozoline (AUS)	Eric Walucho (KEN)
Pool 2	Sunday Opiah (NGR)	Faafetai Iutana (SAM)
Pool 2	Faafetai Iutana (SAM)	Sujeet Maan (IND)
Pool 2	Sunday Opiah (NGR)	Sujeet Maan (IND)
Pool 3	Daniel Igali (CAN)	Nate Ackerman (ENG)
Pool 3	Daniel Igali (CAN)	Muhammad Ali (PAK)
Pool 3	Nate Ackerman (ENG)	Muhammad Ali (PAK)
Pool 4	Bennie Labuschagne (RSA)	Teibana Teisalili Mase (SLB)
Pool 4	Wynand Jacobs (NAM)	Bennie Labuschagne (RSA)
Pool 4	Wynand Jacobs (NAM)	Teibana Teisalili Mase (SLB)
semi final	Daniel Igali (CAN)	Wynand Jacobs (NAM)
semi final	Sunday Opiah (NGR)	Rein Ozoline (AUS)
Bronze	Rein Ozoline (AUS)	Wynand Jacobs (NAM)
Gold	Daniel Igali (CAN)	Sunday Opiah (NGR)

=== 84 kg ===
Round	Winner	Loser
Pool 1	Nico Jacobs (NAM)	Andreas Pieri (CYP)
Pool 1	Nicholas Ugoalah (CAN)	Andreas Pieri (CYP)
Pool 1	Nicholas Ugoalah (CAN)	Nico Jacobs (NAM)
Pool 2	Sinivie Boltic (NGR)	Muhammad Usman (PAK)
Pool 2	Muhammad Usman (PAK)	Nick Daly (NZL)
Pool 2	Sinivie Boltic (NGR)	Nick Daly (NZL)
Pool 3	Anuj Chaudhary (IND)	Jules Kamdem (CMR)
Pool 3	Joseph Bianco (SCO)	Daniel Thomas Kelly (AUS)
Pool 3	Daniel Thomas Kelly (AUS)	Jules Kamdem (CMR)
Pool 3	Joseph Bianco (SCO)	Jules Kamdem (CMR)
Pool 3	Anuj Chaudhary (IND)	Daniel Thomas Kelly (AUS)
Pool 3	Anuj Chaudhary (IND)	Joseph Bianco (SCO)
Pool 4	Jatinder Singh Chatha (ENG)	Abraham Vassallo (MLT)
Pool 4	Jatinder Singh Chatha (ENG)	Badjie Hatabou (GAM)
Pool 4	Jatinder Singh Chatha (ENG)	Linus Masheti (KEN)
Pool 4	Abraham Vassallo (MLT)	Badjie Hatabou (GAM)
Pool 4	Linus Masheti (KEN)	Badjie Hatabou (GAM)
Pool 4	Abraham Vassallo (MLT)	Linus Mashet (KEN)
semi final	Nicholas Ugoalah (CAN)	Sinivie Boltic (NGR)
semi final	Anuj Chaudhary (IND)	Jatinder Singh Chatha (ENG)
Bronze	Sinivie Boltic (NGR)	Jatinder Singh Chatha (ENG)
Gold	Nicholas Ugoalah (CAN)	Anuj Chaudhary (IND)

=== 96 kg ===
Round	Winner	Loser
Pool 1	Dean Schmeichel (CAN)	Johannes Rossouw (ENG)
Pool 1	Bashir Bhola Bhala (PAK)	Johannes Rossouw (ENG)
Pool 1	Dean Schmeichel (CAN)	Bashir Bhola Bhala (PAK)
Pool 2	Victor Kodei (NGR)	Igor Praporshchikov (AUS)
Pool 2	Victor Kodei (NGR)	Anil Kumar Mann (IND)
Pool 2	Anil Kumar Mann (IND)	Igor Praporshchikov (AUS)
Bronze	Anil Kumar Mann (IND)	Bashir Bhola Bhala (PAK)
Gold	Dean Schmeichel (CAN)	Victor Kodei (NGR)

=== 120 kg ===
Round	Winner	Loser
Pool 1	Mushtaq Rasem Abdullah (AUS)	Sanneh Nuha (GAM)
Pool 1	Palwinder Singh Cheema (IND)	Sanneh Nuha (GAM)
Pool 1	Palwinder Singh Cheema (IND)	Mushtaq Rasem Abdullah (AUS)
Pool 2	Eric Kirschner (CAN)	Amarjit Singh (ENG)
Pool 2	Eric Kirschner (CAN)	Douglas Thomson (SCO)
Pool 2	Douglas Thomson (SCO)	Amarjit Singh (ENG)
Bronze	Mushtaq Rasem Abdullah (AUS)	Douglas Thomson (SCO)
Gold	Palwinder Singh Cheema (IND)	Eric Kirschner (CAN)

== See also ==
- List of Commonwealth Games medallists in wrestling
