= Wang Yuanyuan =

Wang Yuanyuan may refer to:

- Wang Yuanyuan (wrestler)
- Wang Yuanyuan (volleyball)
