= Rustam Aghayev =

Azerbaijani freestyle wrestler

Personal information
- Full name: Rustam Aghayev
- Nationality: Azerbaijan
- Born: 1 May 1982 (age 44) Moscow, Russian SFSR, Soviet Union
- Height: 1.86 m (6 ft 1 in)
- Weight: 96 kg (212 lb)

Sport
- Style: Freestyle
- Club: Neftçi Baku (AZE)
- Coach: Dyevanshir Kurbanov
Medal record
Men's freestyle wrestling
Representing Azerbaijan
European Championships
Silver medal – second place	2004 Ankara	96 kg

Rustam Aghayev (Azerbaijani: Rüstəm Ağayev; born 1 May 1982 in Moscow, Russian SFSR) is a retired amateur Azerbaijani freestyle wrestler, who competed in the men's heavyweight category. He won a bronze medal in the 96-kg division at the 2004 European Wrestling Championships in Ankara, Turkey, and then represented his nation Azerbaijan at the Summer Olympics a few months later. Throughout his sporting career, Aghayev trained for Neftçi Sports Club in Baku, under his personal coach and mentor Dyevanshir Kurbanov.

Aghayev qualified for his adopted Azerbaijan squad in the men's heavyweight class (96 kg) at the 2004 Summer Olympics in Athens, by placing third and receiving a berth from the Olympic Qualification Tournament in Bratislava, Slovakia. In the prelim pool, Aghayev eclipsed Kazakhstan's Islam Bairamukov with a 7–2 division on his opening bout, and grappled Namibia's Nico Jacobs into the ring at the peak of the first minute by an eleven-point advantage, earning him a spot for the quarterfinals. Followed by the next day's session, Aghayev could not push Iranian wrestler Alireza Heidari off the mat with a 5–0 defeat in the quarterfinal match, but offered a chance to redeem himself as he pinned China's Wang Yuanyuan in nearly a full minute for a fifth-place finish.
