= Tibilov =

Tibilov (Russian: Тибилов, Iron Ossetic: Тыбылтæ) is an Ossetian masculine surname, its feminine counterpart is Tibilova. It may refer to:

== List ==
- Georgii Tibilov (born 1984), Ukrainian freestyle wrestler
- Leonid Tibilov (born 1952), South Ossetian politician
