= Krasimir Kochev =

Bulgarian freestyle wrestler (1974–2025)

Personal information
- Full name: Krasimir Simeonov Kochev
- Nationality: Bulgaria
- Born: 4 May 1974 Petrich, Bulgaria
- Died: 23 January 2025 (aged 50)
- Height: 1.86 m (6 ft 1 in)
- Weight: 97 kg (214 lb)

Sport
- Style: Freestyle
- Club: Slavia Sofia Children: Simon Kochev, Ivana Kocheva
- Coach: Simeon Shcherev
Medal record
Men's freestyle wrestling
Representing Bulgaria
World Championships
Silver medal – second place	2001 Sofia	97 kg
Bronze medal – third place	2003 New York	96 kg
European Championships
Bronze medal – third place	2005 Varna	96 kg

Krasimir Simeonov Kochev (Bulgarian: Красимир Симеонов Кочев; 4 May 1974 – 23 January 2025) was a Bulgarian amateur freestyle wrestler, who competed in the men's heavyweight category. Considered one of Bulgaria's top freestyle wrestlers in his decade, Kochev has claimed two career medals (one silver and one bronze) at the World Championships (2001 and 2003), picked up a bronze at the 2005 European Championships in Varna, and achieved top seventeen finishes in two editions of the Olympic Games (2000 and 2004). Throughout his sporting career, Kochev trained as a member of the freestyle wrestling team for Slavia Sport Club in Sofia, under his head coach Simeon Shcherev.

Kochev made his official debut at the 2000 Summer Olympics in Sydney, where he competed in the men's super heavyweight division (130 kg). He lost his opening match to Cuba's Alexis Rodríguez without receiving a single point on the morning session, but pulled off a 1–1 draw to tame Mongolia's Dolgorsürengiin Sumyaabazar at the end of the round-robin. Finishing second in the prelim pool and twelfth overall, Kochev's performance fell short to put him further into the quarterfinals.

When his nation Bulgaria hosted the 2001 World Wrestling Championships in Sofia, Kochev lowered his weight to less than a hundred kilograms to compete in the 97-kg division. Despite being brought by the massive roar of the home crowd, Kochev was defeated by Russia's Giorgi Gogshelidze (who later represented Georgia in two Olympic Games) in the final match 0–3, and won a silver medal for the host nation. Two years later, at the 2003 World Wrestling Championships in New York City, New York, United States, Kochev came strong with a bronze medal effort in the 96-kg division, which effectively earned him a ticket to his second Olympics.

At the 2004 Summer Olympics in Athens, Kochev qualified for his second Bulgarian squad, as a 30-year-old, in the men's heavyweight class (96 kg) by placing third and receiving a berth from the World Championships. Unlike his previous Olympics, Kochev made an embarrassing exit with two straight defeats from Kyrgyzstan's Aleksey Krupnyakov (2–3) and Uzbekistan's Magomed Ibragimov (0–3), leaving him on the bottom of the pool and finishing seventeenth overall in the final standings.

Kochev died after a long illness on 23 January 2025, at the age of 50.
