= Meisam Amini =

Iranian freestyle wrestler and coach

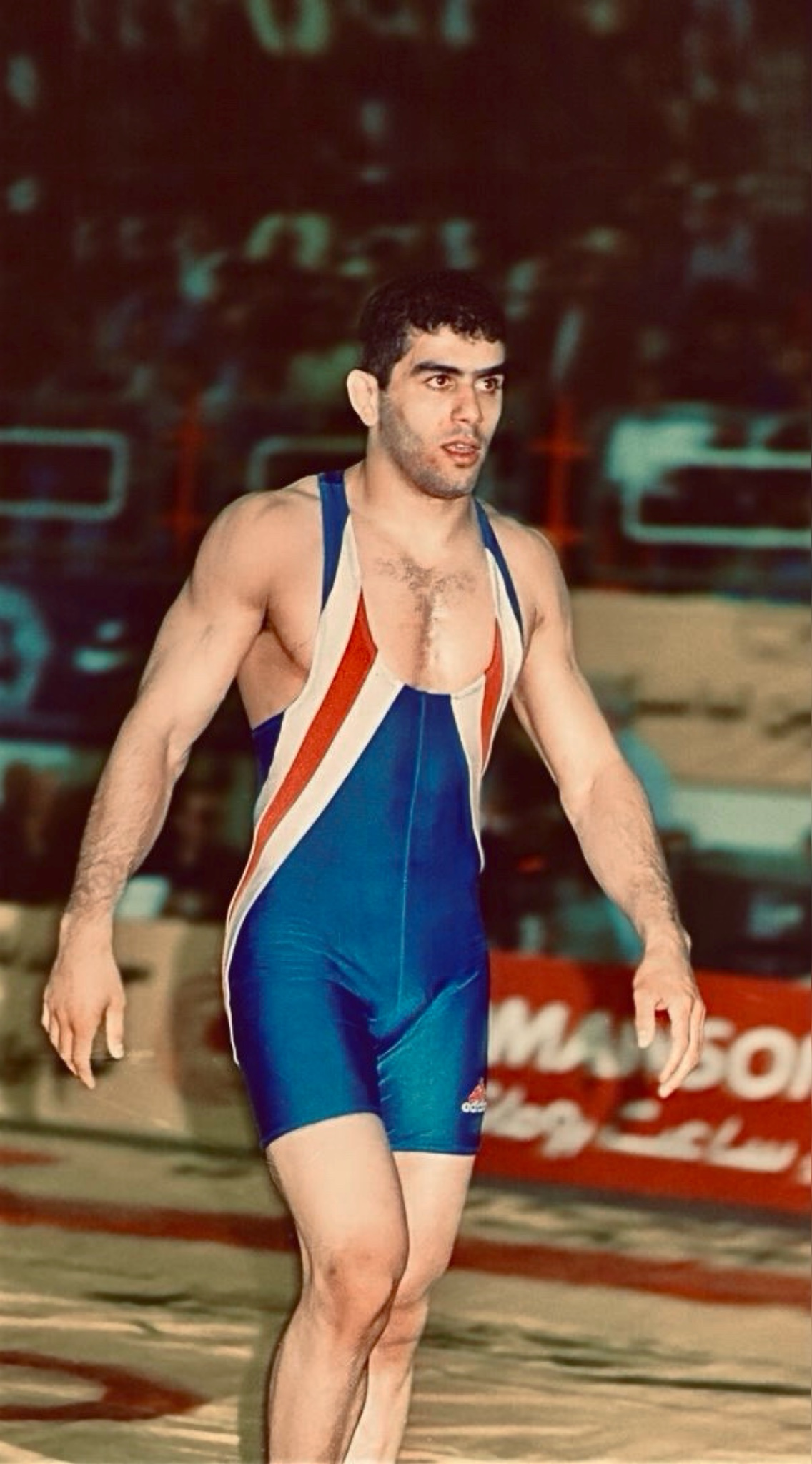
- Amini in 2002

Personal information
- Native name: میثم امینی
- Full name: Meisam Amini
- Nationality: Iran
- Born: 11 September 1983 (age 42) Sari, Iran
- Height: 182 cm (6 ft 0 in)

Sport
- Country: Iran
- Sport: Wrestling
- Event: Freestyle
Medal record
Men's freestyle wrestling
Representing Iran
World Junior Championships
Silver medal – second place	2003 Istanbul	74 kg

Meisam Amini (born 11 September 1983 in Sari, Mazandaran province) is a former World and Asian freestyle wrestler medalist and a freestyle wrestling coach based in Lyon, France. He is a technical instructor for CIV (Ivory Coast).

== Career ==
After winning a Silver medal (69 kg) in the 2000 Asian Cadet Wrestling Championships, Hamedan, Iran, and Gold in the 2002 Asian Junior Wrestling Championships, Mashhad, Amini retired from wrestling due to a back injury after winning a Silver medal (74Kg) in the 2003 World Junior Wrestling Championships.

Since 2016, he has been training youth and adult wrestlers in Lyon, France. He has also led several international wrestling training camps, including in the Ivory Coast, where his role as Technical Instructor helps to develop wrestling talent and to promote the sport in that country.
