= Radovan Valach =

Austrian freestyle wrestler

Personal information
- Full name: Radovan Valach
- Nationality: Austria
- Born: 21 March 1976 (age 50) Trenčín, Czechoslovakia
- Height: 1.85 m (6 ft 1 in)
- Weight: 99 kg (218 lb)

Sport
- Style: Freestyle
- Club: AC Wals
- Coach: Georg Neumaier

Radovan Valach (born 21 March 1976) is a retired amateur Austrian freestyle wrestler, who competed in the men's heavyweight category. He finished ninth in the 96-kg division at the 2003 World Wrestling Championships in New York City, New York, United States, and later represented his nation Austria at the 2004 Summer Olympics. Throughout his sporting career, Valach trained full-time for AC Wals Wrestling Club in Wals-Siezenheim, under his personal coach Georg Neumaier. Being born in the former Czechoslovakia, Valach also holds a dual citizenship with Slovakia to compete in numerous wrestling tournaments.

Valach qualified for his naturalized Austrian squad in the men's 96 kg class at the 2004 Summer Olympics in Athens by receiving a berth and placing ninth from the World Championships. Valach was easily overwhelmed by U.S. wrestler Daniel Cormier on his opening match 0–9, and could not recover his form to wrestle Poland's Bartłomiej Bartnicki at 1–4, leaving him on the bottom of the prelim pool and finishing nineteenth overall in the final standings.
