= Arturo Ruas =

Brazilian professional wrestler (born 1981)

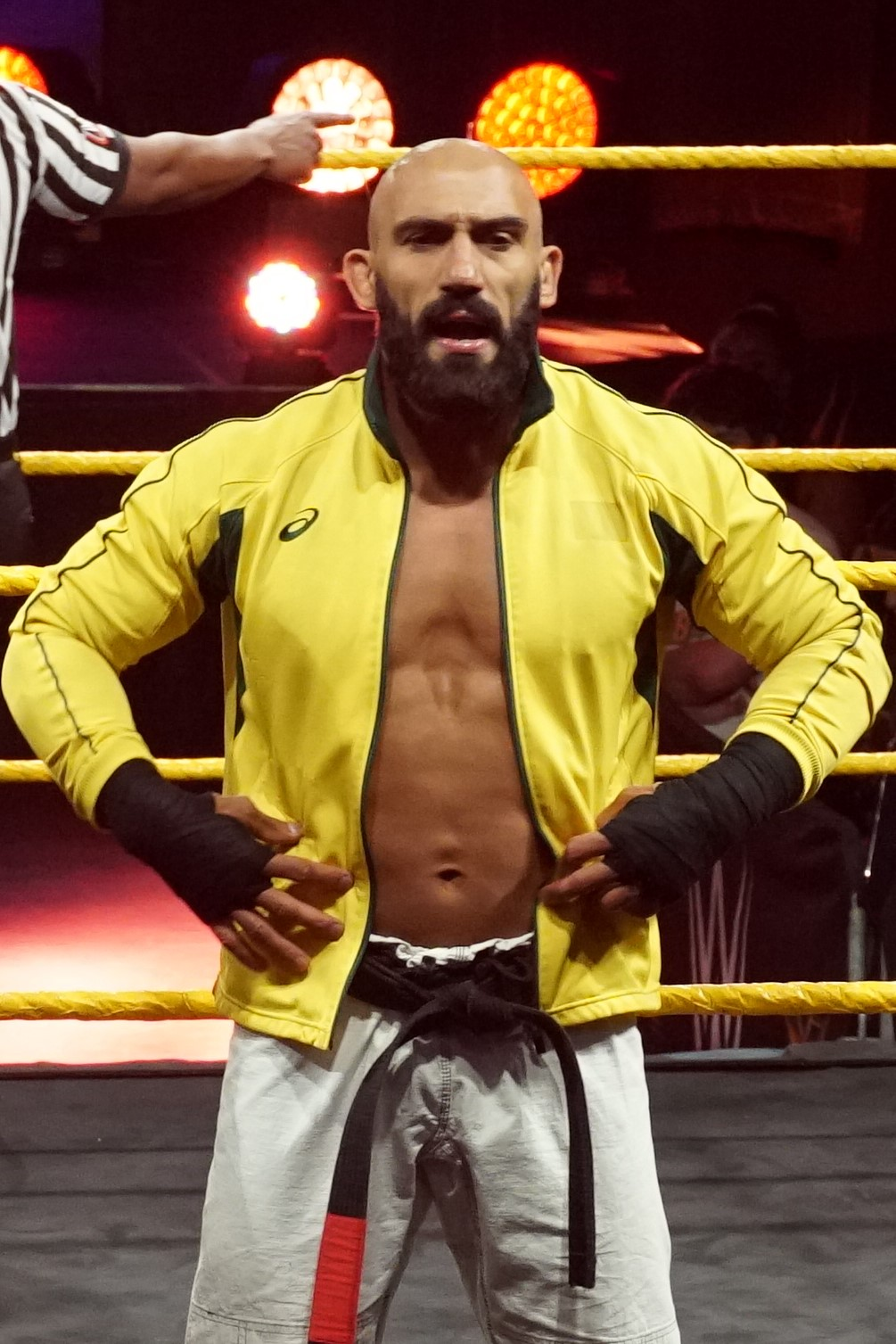
- Ruas in April 2018

Personal information
- Born: Adrián Antoine Abou Jaoude; 11 October 1981 (age 44) Jal el Dib, Lebanon
- Children: 3
- Relative: Antoine Jaoude (brother)

Professional wrestling career
- Ring name(s): Adrian Jaoude; Arturo Ruas; Tiger Ruas
- Billed height: 6 ft 2 in (188 cm)
- Billed weight: 220 lb (100 kg)
- Billed from: Rio de Janeiro, Brazil
- Trained by: WWE Performance Center
- Debut: 8 July 2016
- Retired: 2022
Medal record
Men's freestyle wrestling
Representing Brazil
South American Championships
Gold medal – first place	2009 Lima	84 kg
Silver medal – second place	2013 Santiago	84 kg
Bronze medal – third place	2012 Callao	84 kg
South American Games
Bronze medal – third place	2006 Buenos Aires	84 kg
Bronze medal – third place	2014 Santiago	86 kg
Pan American Championships
Bronze medal – third place	2008 Colorado Springs	84 kg

Adrián Antoine Abou Jaoude (Note: This name uses Portuguese naming customs: the first or maternal family name is Abou and the second or paternal family name is Jaoude.) (born 11 October 1981) is a Lebanese-Brazilian professional wrestler, Jiu-Jitsu practitioner, and former amateur wrestler. He is best known for his time in WWE, where he performed under the ring name Arturo Ruas. Previously, he has also wrestled for Evolve. Prior to entering pro wrestling he was an amateur wrestler and represented his country at the 2011 Pan American Games in Guadalajara, Mexico.

== Biography ==
Jaoude was born in Jal el Dib to a Lebanese father and a Brazilian mother. In 1977, his parents went with his older brother to Lebanon to originally visit his paternal family for a short time. However, due to the civil war that broke out while they were there, they were only able to return to Brazil more than 13 years later. He represented Brazil in amateur wrestling from 2006 to 2015.

== Amateur wrestling and combat sports career ==
Jaoude participated in the men's 84 kg division in amateur wrestling at the 2011 Pan American Games, finishing 4th. For 17 years he was an unbeaten freestyle wrestling champion in Brazil. As well as Jiu-Jitsu, he is also well-versed in capoeira.

== Professional wrestling career ==
=== WWE (2015–2021) ===
Jaoude signed with WWE in 2015. He was trained at the WWE Performance Center and made his debut in July 2016 during a house show, in which he teamed with Niko Bogojevic (Otis) against Gzim Selmani (Rezar) and Sunny Dhinsa (Akam). On 18 July 2018 episode of NXT, Jaoude made his NXT debut where he was defeated by Kassius Ohno (Chris Hero). On 13 June 2019 episode of NXT, Jaoude, now under the ring name of Arturo Ruas, was defeated by Matt Riddle.

On 10 August 2020 episode of Raw, Ruas made his Raw debut in a Raw Underground segment, an underground fight club hosted by Shane McMahon, where he defeated Mikey Spandex by knockout. As part of the 2020 Draft in October, Ruas was drafted to the Raw brand, though he was then quickly and quietly moved back to NXT. On 25 June 2021, Jaoude was released from his WWE contract.

=== AEW (2021) ===
On 26 October 2021, Jaoude made his in-ring debut during an episode of AEW Dark, under the name Tiger Ruas.

== Championships and accomplishments ==
- Pro Wrestling Illustrated
  - Ranked No. 483 of the top 500 singles wrestlers in the PWI 500 in 2019
