= Tüvshintöriin Enkhtuyaa =

Mongolian freestyle wrestler

Personal information
- Full name: Tüvshintöriin Enkhtuyaa
- Nationality: Mongolia
- Born: 4 August 1982 (age 43) Ulaanbaatar, Mongolia
- Height: 1.83 m (6 ft 0 in)
- Weight: 109 kg (240 lb)

Sport
- Style: Freestyle
- Club: Gobi Wrestling Club
- Coach: Agvaan Ganbaatar

Tüvshintöriin Enkhtuyaa (also Tuvshintur Enkhtuya, Mongolian: Түвшинтөрийн Энхтуяа; born August 4, 1982, in Ulaanbaatar) is a retired amateur Mongolian freestyle wrestler, who competed in the men's heavyweight category. He finished fourth in the 96-kg division at the 2003 World Wrestling Championships in New York City, New York, United States, and later represented his nation Mongolia at the 2004 Summer Olympics. Tuvshintur also trained for Gobi Wrestling Club in his native Ulaanbaatar, under his personal coach Agvaan Ganbaatar.

Tuvshintur qualified for the Mongolian squad in the men's 96 kg class at the 2004 Summer Olympics in Athens. Earlier in the process, he received a berth and rounded out the fourth spot in the heavyweight category from the 2003 World Wrestling Championships in New York City, New York, United States, losing the bronze medal to Bulgaria's Krasimir Kochev. Tuvshintur lost two straight matches each to Turkey's Fatih Çakıroğlu by a technical fall and two-time Olympian Aleksandr Shemarov of Belarus with a smooth 0–3 record, leaving him on the bottom of the pool and placing last out of 21 wrestlers in the final standings.
