= Anuj Kumar Chaudhary =

Indian freestyle wrestler and Additional Superintendent of Police

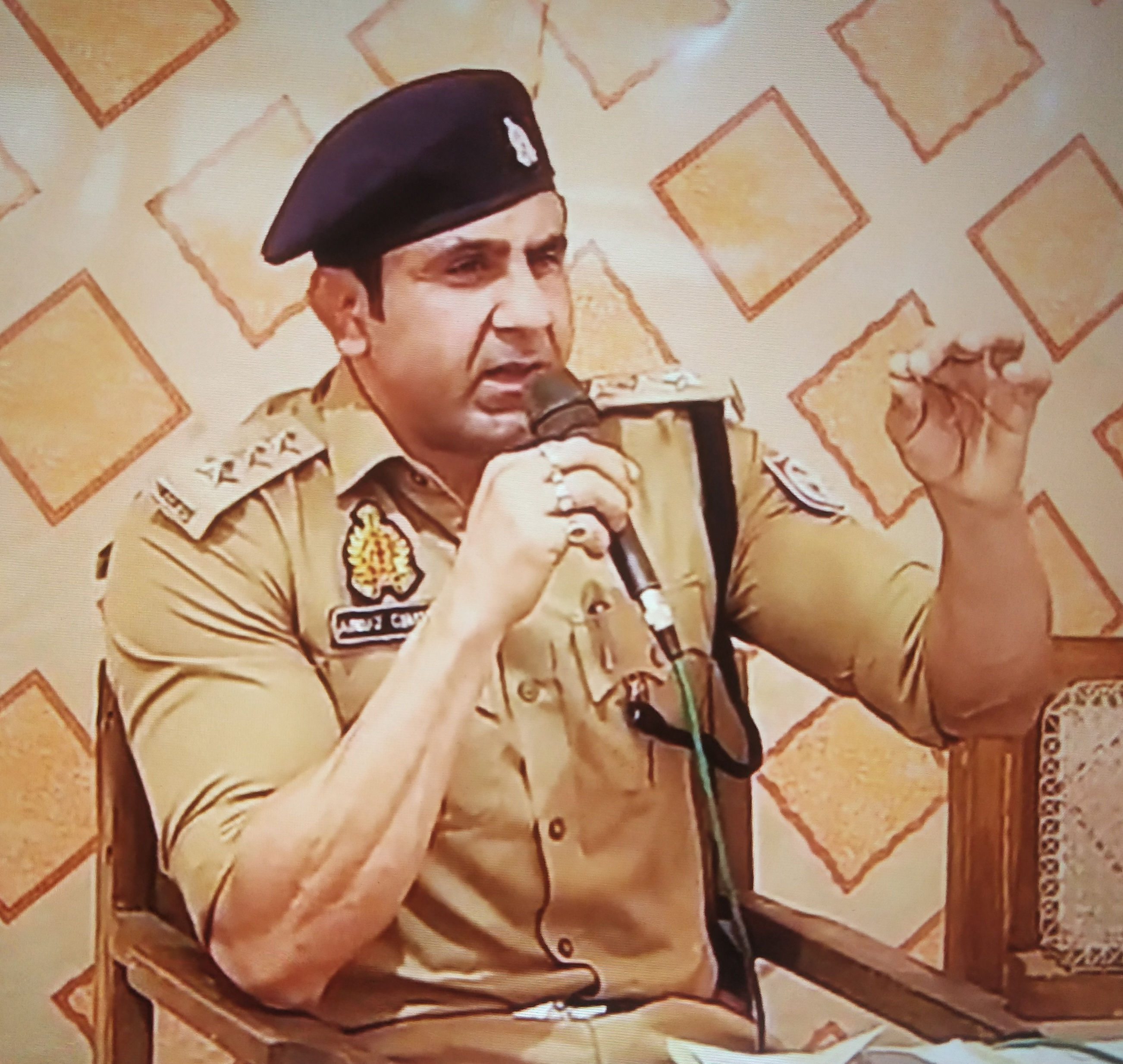
- Anuj Chaudhary in 2025

Personal information
- Full name: Anuj Kumar Chaudhary
- Nationality: India
- Born: 5 August 1980 (age 46) Badheri Village, Muzaffarnagar district, Uttar Pradesh
- Height: 1.80 m (5 ft 11 in)
- Weight: 84 kg (185 lb)
- Website: anujchaudharyolympian.com
- Police career
- Allegiance: India
- Department: Police Department
- Branch: Uttar Pradesh Police
- Service years: 2012-present
- Rank: Addl.SP
- Awards: Arjuna Award

Sport
- Country: India
- Style: Freestyle
- Club: Guru Hanuman Akhara
Medal record
Men's freestyle wrestling
Representing India
Commonwealth Games
| Silver medal – second place | 2002 Manchester | 84 kg |
| Silver medal – second place | 2010 Delhi | 84 kg |
Asian Wrestling Championships
| Bronze medal – third place | 2005 Wuhan | 84 kg |
| Bronze medal – third place | 2009 Pattaya | 84 kg |
Commonwealth Wrestling Championships
| Gold medal – first place | 2003 London, Canada | 84 kg |
| Gold medal – first place | 2005 Cape Town | 84 kg |
South Asian Games
| Gold medal – first place | 1999 Kathmandu | 84 kg |
Canada Cup
| Bronze medal – third place | 2003 Guelph | 84 kg |

Anuj Kumar Chaudhary (born 5 August) is a retired Indian freestyle wrestler and Additional Superintendent of Police (ADDL. SP) in Uttar Pradesh. He competed for India in the 84 kg freestyle wrestling category at numerous international tournaments, including the 2004 Summer Olympics in Athens. He is a recipient of the Arjuna Award and has won medals at the Commonwealth Games, Asian Wrestling Championships, and World Police Games.

== Early life and training ==
Born in Badheri village in Muzaffarnagar district, Uttar Pradesh, Anuj trained at the prestigious Guru Hanuman Akhara in New Delhi.

== Wrestling career ==
=== National achievements ===
- Multiple-time gold medalist at National Championships (1996–2008)
- Gold medals in National Games: Jalandhar (2001), Hyderabad (2002), Guwahati (2007)
- Gold medals in All India Police Games across multiple years (2002–2007)

=== International achievements ===
- Gold – Commonwealth Wrestling Championship, Pune (1997)
- Gold – SAF Games, Kathmandu (1999)
- Gold – Khalsa International Sports Festival, Anandpur Sahib (1999)
- Silver – 2002 Commonwealth Games, Manchester (84 kg freestyle)
- Participated – 2002 Asian Games, Busan
- Silver – Canada Cup, Guelph (2003)
- Silver – World Police Games (Freestyle & Greco-Roman), Spain (2003)
- Gold – Commonwealth Wrestling Championship, London, Canada (2003)
- Bronze – Olympic Qualifier, Sofia, Bulgaria (2004)
- 15th place – 2004 Summer Olympics, Athens
- Bronze – Asian Wrestling Championships, Wuhan, China (2005)
- Gold – Commonwealth Wrestling Championship, South Africa (2005)
- Bronze – Asian Wrestling Championships, Pattaya, Thailand (2009)
- Participated – 2006 Asian Games, Doha
- Competed in Dave Schultz Memorial (USA), Grand Prix (Germany), World Championships (New York)

== Police career ==
Anuj joined Uttar Pradesh Police as a Sub Inspector in 2000 via sports quota. He got promoted as an Inspector in 2003 and later to Deputy Superintendent of Police in 2012, he has served in districts like Rampur, Sambhal, etc. In August 2025, he got promoted as Additional Superintendent of Police.

== Awards and honours ==
- Arjuna Award (2005) – Government of India
- Laxman Award (2001) – Government of Uttar Pradesh
- Yash Bharti Award (2016) – Government of Uttar Pradesh
- Manyawar Kanshiram Puraskar (2010) – Government of Uttar Pradesh
- Titles: Sher-e-Hind (3x), Bharat Kumar (2x), Uttar Pradesh Kesari, Delhi Kesari, Guru Hanuman Gaurav

== See also ==
- Wrestling in India
- Guru Hanuman
- 2004 Summer Olympics
- Commonwealth Games
- Asian Wrestling Championships
