= Stefan Kehrer =

German freestyle wrestler

Personal information
- Nationality: Germany
- Born: 18 January 1985 (age 41) Mannheim, Baden-Württemberg, West Germany
- Height: 1.85 m (6 ft 1 in)
- Weight: 96 kg (212 lb)

Sport
- Sport: Wrestling
- Event: Freestyle
- Club: KSV Ketsch
- Coached by: Rainer Kamm
Medal record
Men's freestyle wrestling
Representing Germany
European Championships
Bronze medal – third place	2006 Moscow	96 kg

Stefan Kehrer (born January 18, 1985, in Mannheim, Baden-Württemberg) is an amateur German freestyle wrestler, who played for the men's heavyweight category. He won a bronze medal for his division at the 2006 European Wrestling Championships in Moscow, Russia.

Kehrer represented Germany at the 2008 Summer Olympics in Beijing, where he competed for the men's 96 kg class. He received a bye for the preliminary round of sixteen match, before losing out to Turkey's Hakan Koç, who was able to score one point each in two straight periods, leaving Kehrer with a single point.
