= Aleksandr Shemarov =

Belarusian freestyle wrestler

Personal information
- Full name: Aleksandr Shemarov
- Nationality: Belarus
- Born: 9 April 1975 (age 51) Kaliningrad, Russian SFSR, Soviet Union
- Height: 1.82 m (5 ft 11 1/2 in)
- Weight: 96 kg (212 lb)

Sport
- Style: Freestyle
- Club: Trade Union Sports Club (BLR)
- Coach: Nikolai Shemarov; Valentin Murzinkov
Medal record
Men's freestyle wrestling
Representing Belarus
European Championships
Bronze medal – third place	2001 Budapest	97 kg

Aleksandr Shemarov (also Aliaksandr Shamarau, Belarusian: Аляксандр Шамараў; born April 9, 1975) is a retired amateur Belarusian freestyle wrestler, who competed in the men's heavyweight category. He won a bronze medal in the 97-kg division at the 2001 European Championships in Budapest, Hungary, and also achieved a seventh-place finish each in two editions of the Olympic Games (2000 and 2004). Throughout his sporting career, Shemarov trained as a member of the freestyle wrestling team for Minsk Trade Union Sports Club, under his father and coach Nikolai Shemarov.

Shemarov made his official debut at the 2000 Summer Olympics in Sydney, where he competed in the men's heavyweight division (97 kg). He scored a set of two triumphs to defeat Canada's Dean Schmeichel and Slovak-born Australian wrestler Gabriel Szerda in the opening matches, but suffered a formidable 2–3 overtime defeat against Poland's three-time Olympian Marek Garmulewicz. Finishing second in the prelim pool and seventh overall, Shemarov's performance fell short to put him further into the quarterfinals.

At the 2004 Summer Olympics in Athens, Shemarov qualified for his second Belarusian squad, as a 29-year-old, in the men's heavyweight class (96 kg) by rounding out the top ten spot and receiving a berth from the 2003 World Wrestling Championships in New York City, New York, United States. Shemarov delivered a more powerful effort from his previous Games by thrashing Turkey's Fatih Çakıroğlu and Mongolia's Tüvshintöriin Enkhtuyaa to secure a spot for the next round. Fighting against Russian wrestler and European champion Khadzhimurat Gatsalov in the quarterfinal match, Shemarov could not score a single point to push him off the mat, and instead, matched his final standing from Sydney in the process.

Shortly after the Games, Shemarov officially retired from his sporting career, and became a personal coach for his younger brother Alexei, who later competed in the men's super heavyweight division at the 2012 Summer Olympics in London.
