= Nico Jacobs =

Namibian Olympic wrestler

Personal information
- Full name: Nicolaas Jacobs
- Nationality: Namibia
- Born: 26 January 1981 (age 45) Pretoria, South Africa
- Height: 1.80 m (5 ft 11 in)
- Weight: 96 kg (212 lb)

Sport
- Style: Freestyle
- Club: University of Calgary (CAN)
- Coach: Leigh Vierling (CAN)
Medal record
Men's freestyle wrestling
Representing Namibia
All-Africa Games
Bronze medal – third place	2003 Abuja	96 kg

Nicolaas "Nico" Jacobs (born January 26, 1981, in Pretoria, South Africa) is a retired amateur Namibian freestyle wrestler, who competed in the men's heavyweight category. Jacobs had claimed a bronze medal in the 96-kg division at the 2003 All-Africa Games in Abuja, Nigeria, and later became the first Namibian wrestler in history to compete at the 2004 Summer Olympics in Athens. A graduate at the University of Calgary in Canada, Jacobs trained for the university's wrestling team under his head coach Leigh Vierling.

Jacobs qualified for the Namibian squad, as the nation's first and lone wrestler, in the men's heavyweight class (96 kg) at the 2004 Summer Olympics in Athens, with a remarkable milestone. Earlier in the process, he placed sixth in the 97-kg division at the 2003 World Wrestling Championships in New York City, New York, United States, which automatically secured him a spot for his Olympic debut. He lost two straight matches each to Kazakhstan's Islam Bairamukov with a 1–7 decision, and Azerbaijan's Rustam Aghayev, who pinned him into the mat by both an eleven-point advantage and a technical fall, in the prelim pool, finishing eighteenth overall in the final rankings.
