= Mateusz Gucman =

Polish freestyle wrestler (born 1980)

Mateusz Gucman (born 19 April 1980 in Głubczyce) is a Polish freestyle wrestler who competed in the 2008 Summer Olympics in Beijing.

At the 2008 Summer Olympics he finished 17th in the heavyweight competition (96 kg) in wrestling.
