= Georgii Tibilov =

Ukrainian freestyle wrestler (born 1984)

Personal information
- Full name: Heorhiy Vasylovych Tibilov
- Nationality: Ukraine
- Born: 6 November 1984 (age 41) Vladikavkaz, Russian SFSR, Soviet Union
- Height: 1.80 m (5 ft 11 in)
- Weight: 96 kg (212 lb)

Sport
- Sport: Wrestling
- Event: Freestyle
- Club: Dynamo Kharkiv
- Coached by: Ruslan Savlokhov
Medal record
Men's freestyle wrestling
Representing Ukraine
European Championships
Silver medal – second place	2008 Tampere	96 kg

Heorhiy Vasylovych Tibilov (also Georgii Tibilov, Ukrainian: Георгій Васильович Тібілов; born November 6, 1984, in Vladikavkaz, Russian SFSR) is an amateur Ukrainian freestyle wrestler, who played for the men's heavyweight category. He won a silver medal for his division at the 2008 European Wrestling Championships in Tampere, Finland, losing out to Georgia's Giorgi Gogshelidze.

Tibilov represented Ukraine at the 2008 Summer Olympics in Beijing, where he competed for the men's 96 kg class. He received a bye for the preliminary round of sixteen match, before losing out to Russia's Shirvani Muradov, with a three-set technical score (1–0, 0–1, 0–1), and a classification point score of 1–3. Because his opponent advanced further into the final match, Tibilov offered another shot for the bronze medal by defeating Turkey's Hakan Koç in the repechage round. He progressed to the bronze medal match, but narrowly lost the medal to Azerbaijan's Khetag Gazyumov, who was able to score seven points in two straight periods, leaving Tibilov without a single point.
