= Shirvani Muradov =

Russian freestyle wrestler (born 1985)

Medal record

Men's freestyle wrestling

Representing Russia

Olympic Games
Gold medal – first place	2008 Beijing	96 kg

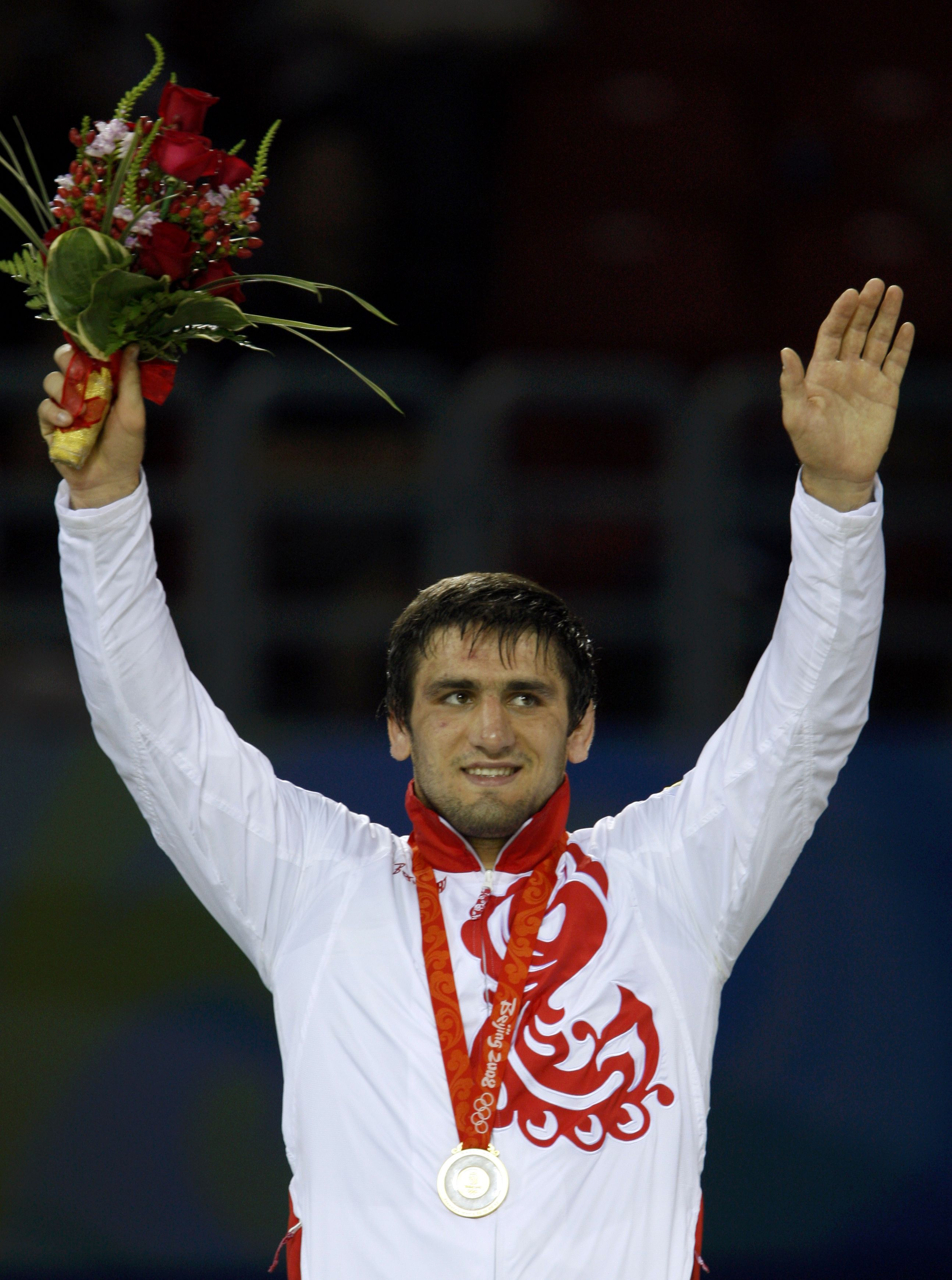
Muradov at the 2008 Summer Olympics

Shirvani Gadzhikurbanovich Muradov (Lak: Ширвани Гаджикурбанович Мурадов; born 20 June 1985 in Dagestan) is a Russian wrestler, who has won a gold medal at the 2008 Summer Olympics and European champion 2007.

Shirvani is of Lak heritage.
