= Dean Schmeichel =

Canadian wrestler (born 1973)

Personal information
- Full name: Dean Ryan Schmeichel
- Born: 10 October 1973 (age 52) Tisdale, Saskatchewan, Canada
- Height: 178 cm (5 ft 10 in)
- Weight: 97 kg (214 lb)

Sport
- Sport: Wrestling
Medal record
Men's freestyle wrestling
Representing Canada
Pan American Games
Bronze medal – third place	1999 Winnipeg	-97kg freestyle
Commonwealth Games
Gold medal – first place	2002 Manchester	-96kg freestyle

Dean Ryan Schmeichel (born 10 October 1973) is a former Canadian wrestler. He competed in the men's freestyle 97 kg at the 2000 Summer Olympics.

Schmeichel retired from wrestling in 2006.
