= Hakan Koç =

Turkish wrestler (born 1980)

Personal information
- Nationality: Turkey
- Born: 25 November 1980 (age 45) Sivas, Turkey
- Height: 1.73 m (5 ft 8 in)
- Weight: 96 kg (212 lb)

Sport
- Sport: Wrestling
- Event: Freestyle
- Club: Amasya Şeker Spor
- Coached by: Dshahid Agiskoglu
Medal record
Men's freestyle wrestling
Representing Turkey
European Championships
Bronze medal – third place	2008 Tampere	96 kg
Mediterranean Games
Gold medal – first place	2005 Almeria	96 kg
Military World Games
Silver medal – second place	2006 Baku	96 kg
Gold medal – first place	2003 Istanbul	96 kg
Grand Prix of Germany
Gold medal – first place	2002 Leipzig	120 kg
Universiade
Silver medal – second place	2005 Izmir	96 kg
EuropeanJunior Championships
Silver medal – second place	2000 Sofia	97 kg

Hakan Koç (born November 25, 1980, in Sivas) is an amateur Turkish freestyle wrestler competing in the heavyweight division. He studied at Selçuk University.

He defeated France's Vincent Aka-Akesse for the gold medal in the 96 kg division at the 2005 Mediterranean Games in Almería, Spain, in addition to his silver medal won at the 2005 Summer Universiade in İzmir, Turkey. He earned the bronze at the 2008 European Wrestling Championships in Tampere, Finland.

Koc represented Turkey at the 2008 Summer Olympics in Beijing, where he competed for the men's 96 kg class. He defeated Germany's Stefan Kehrer in the preliminary round of sixteen, before losing out the quarterfinal match to Russia's Shirvani Muradov, who was able to score three points in two straight periods, leaving Koc without a single point. Because his opponent advanced further into the final match, Koc offered another shot for the bronze medal by entering the repechage bouts. Unfortunately, he was defeated in the first round by Ukraine's Georgii Tibilov, with a two-set technical score (0–1, 1–3), and a classification point score of 1–3.
