= Gergely Kiss (wrestler) =

Hungarian wrestler

Personal information
- Full name: Gergely Sandor Kiss
- Nationality: Hungary
- Born: 6 November 1983 (age 42) Orosháza, Hungary
- Height: 1.92 m (6 ft 3 1/2 in)
- Weight: 96 kg (212 lb)

Sport
- Sport: Wrestling
- Event: Freestyle
- Coached by: István Gulyás

Gergely Sandor Kiss (born November 6, 1983, in Orosháza) is an amateur Hungarian freestyle wrestler, who competed in the men's heavyweight category. Kiss represented Hungary at the 2008 Summer Olympics in Beijing, where he competed for the 96 kg class in men's freestyle wrestling. Kiss reached only into the second preliminary match, where he lost to Uzbekistan's Kurban Kurbanov, with a technical score of 5–9 and a classification score of 1–3.
