= Islam Bayramukov =

Kazakh freestyle wrestler (born 1971)

Medal record

Men's freestyle wrestling

Representing Kazakhstan

Olympic Games
Silver medal – second place	2000 Sydney	97 kg

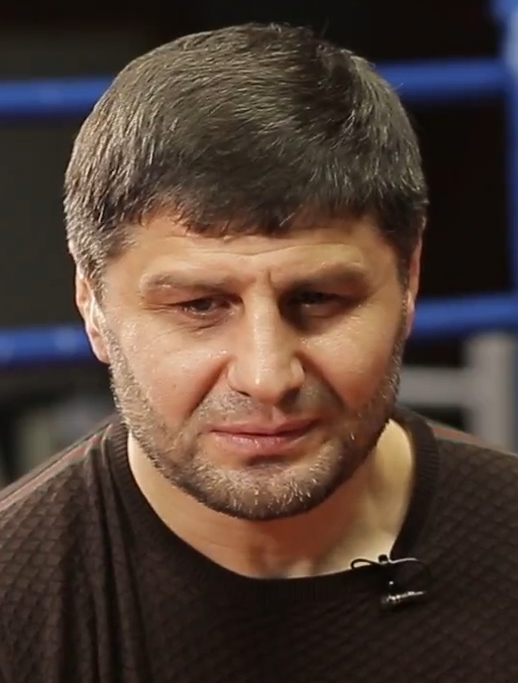
Islam Bayramukov in 2018

Islam Bayramukov (born June 12, 1971) is a Kazakh wrestler who competed in the Men's Freestyle 97 kg at the 2000 Summer Olympics and won the silver medal. He was born in Jambyl Region. He also competed in the 1996 and 2004 Summer Olympics, but did not reach the final rounds.
