= Anil Kumar Mann =

Indian wrestler (born 1980)

Anil Mann
Personal information
- Full name: Anil Kumar Mann
- Nationality: Indian
- Born: 11 December 1980 (age 45) Prahladpur Village, North West Delhi, Delhi

Sport
- Country: India
- Sport: Wrestling
- Team: India
Medal record
Representing India
Men's Wrestling
Commonwealth Games
Silver medal – second place	2002	Silver medal in 2002 commonwealth games mancheater 96kg, Gold Medal 2005 common wealth championship, Gold Medal 2007 common wealth championship in FS category Canada, Gold Medal 2007 common wealth championship in GR category Canada, Medal Freestyle
- Updated on 12 December 2014

Anil Kumar Mann (born 11 December 1980) is an Indian wrestler who wan silver medal in 2002 Commonwealth Games in the men's freestyle 96 kg event. In 2005 mann wins gold medal in commonweatlth championship. In 2007 Mann won two gold medals in freestyle and Greco roman category and best wrestler award and became the first Indian wrestler who won gold medals in both freestyle and greco roman category. In 2020 Olympics games Ravi dahiya won silver medal and bajrang punia won bronze medal and their coach is anil mann . In 2013 Mann was presented the Dhyan Chand Award Now present anil maan is wrestling coach of India wrestling team freestyle category.
