= Antoine Jaoude =

Brazilian freestyle wrestler and mixed martial artist

- Born: Antoine Braga Abou Jaoude; 5 January 1977 (age 49); Rio de Janeiro, Brazil
- Other names: The Diplomat
- Nationality: Brazilian
- Height: 6 ft 3 in (191 cm)
- Weight: 225 lb (102 kg; 16 st 1 lb)
- Division: Heavyweight; Light Heavyweight
- Fighting out of: Rio de Janeiro, Brazil
- Years active: 2001-2005; 2007

Mixed martial arts record
- Total: 11
- Wins: 8
- By knockout: 4
- By submission: 1
- By decision: 3
- Losses: 3
- By knockout: 1
- By decision: 2

Other information
- Notable relatives: Adrian Jaoude (brother)
- Mixed martial arts record from Sherdog

Antoine Braga Abou Jaoude (Note: This name uses Portuguese naming customs: the first or maternal family name is Abou and the second or paternal family name is Jaoude.) (born 5 January 1977) is a Brazilian wrestler and a former mixed martial artist. A professional from 2001 until 2007, he fought for the Southern California Condors in the, now defunct, International Fight League.

== Biography ==
Jaoude was born in Brazil to a Lebanese father and a Brazilian mother. Six months after his birth, his parents went with him to Lebanon to originally visit his paternal family for a short time. However, due to the civil war that broke out while they were there, they were only able to return to Brazil more than 13 years later, when he was 14. He represented Brazil in wrestling as an Olympian in the 2004 Athens Games, where he was the only South American wrestler. He was also a silver medalist in wrestling at the 2003 Pan American Games.

== Personal life ==
Jaoude's brother, Adrian, wrestled in WWE under the ring name Arturo Ruas.

== Mixed martial arts record ==
Professional record breakdown
11 matches	8 wins	3 losses
By knockout	4	1
By submission	1	0
By decision	3	2

Res.	Record	Opponent	Method	Event	Date	Round	Time	Location	Notes
Loss	8–3	Roy Nelson	KO (punch)	IFL: World Grand Prix Finals	29 December 2007	2	0:22	Uncasville, Connecticut, United States	For the inaugural IFL Heavyweight Championship.
Win	8–2	Shane Ott	Submission (arm-triangle choke)	IFL: World Grand Prix Semifinals	3 November 2007	1	3:29	Chicago, Illinois, United States	
Win	7–2	Dan Christison	Decision (unanimous)	IFL: Chicago	19 May 2007	3	4:00	Chicago, Illinois, United States	
Win	6–2	Wayne Cole	KO (punch)	IFL: Los Angeles	17 March 2007	2	0:56	Los Angeles, California, United States	
Win	5–2	Curtis Crawford	Decision (unanimous)	IFL: Oakland	19 January 2007	3	4:00	Oakland, California, United States	
Loss	4–2	Travis Wiuff	Decision (unanimous)	Euphoria: USA vs World	26 February 2005	3	5:00	Atlantic City, New Jersey, United States	
Win	4–1	Roman Zentsov	TKO (injury)	Euphoria: Road to the Titles	15 October 2004	1	3:33	Atlantic City, New Jersey, United States	Return to Heavyweight.
Loss	3–1	Jefferson Silva	Decision (unanimous)	K-1 Brazil: New Stars	27 November 2003	3	5:00	Curitiba, Brazil	Light Heavyweight debut.
Win	3–0	Kristof Midoux	TKO (doctor stoppage)	HOOKnSHOOT: Absolute Fighting Championships 2	28 March 2003	1	3:58	Fort Lauderdale, Florida, United States	
Win	2–0	Rob Constance	Decision (unanimous)	RF 2: Reality Fighting 2	2 November 2002	3	5:00	Wildwood, New Jersey, United States	
Win	1–0	Lucio Cunha	TKO (cut)	BG 1: Brazilian Gladiators 1	14 October 2001	N/A	N/A	Sao Paulo, Brazil	
