= Magomed Ibragimov (wrestler, born 1983) =

Russian-Uzbek wrestler (born 1983)

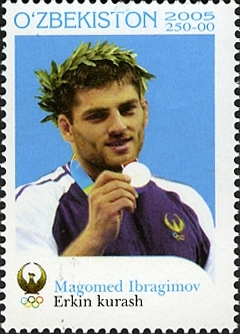
- Ibragimov on a 2006 Uzbek stamp

Personal information
- Full name: Magomed Abdulmuminovich Ibragimov
- Born: 18 August 1983 (age 43) Makhachkala, Russia
- Height: 193 cm (6 ft 4 in)
- Weight: 96 kg (212 lb)
Medal record
Men's freestyle wrestling
Representing Uzbekistan
Olympic Games
Silver medal – second place	2004 Athens	96 kg

Magomed Abdulmuminovich Ibragimov (Uzbek: Магамед Абдулмуминович Ибрагимов; born 18 August 1983) is a Russian-Uzbek wrestler who competed in the freestyle 96 kg event at the 2004 Summer Olympics and won the silver medal. Ibragimov was born in Makhachkala, Dagestan.
