= Peter Pecha =

Slovak freestyle wrestler

Personal information
- Full name: Peter Pecha
- Nationality: Slovakia
- Born: 16 November 1975 (age 50) Bratislava, Czechoslovakia
- Height: 1.79 m (5 ft 10 1/2 in)
- Weight: 96 kg (212 lb)

Sport
- Style: Freestyle
- Club: AŠK Dukla Trenčín
- Coach: Petr Hirjak

Peter Pecha (born 16 November 1975) is a Slovak retired amateur freestyle wrestler who competed in the men's heavyweight category. He represented his country Slovakia at two Olympic Games (2000 and 2004) and achieved a top five finish in the 130-kg division at the 2000 European Wrestling Championships in Budapest. Throughout his sporting career, Pecha trained as part of the freestyle wrestling team for AŠK Dukla Trenčín, under his long-time coach and mentor Petr Hirjak.

Pecha made his official debut at the 2000 Summer Olympics in Sydney, where he competed in the men's super heavyweight division (130 kg). He lost his opening bout against Germany's Sven Thiele with a technical superiority, and could not fight for the following match against Russia's David Musulbes, who later took home the Olympic gold in the final, because of a hip injury sustained from the previous match. At the preliminary competition, Pecha finished in third place but sixteenth in overall final rankings; he was severely injured during the Games.

At the 2004 Summer Olympics in Athens, Pecha qualified for the Slovak squad, as a 29-year-old, in the men's heavyweight class (96 kg) by receiving a berth from the second Olympic Qualification Tournament in Sofia, Bulgaria. Pecha could not beat China's Wang Yuanyuan into the ring on his opening duel, but managed to redeem himself by eclipsing the host nation's Alexandros Laliotis in his second match. Pecha finished the preliminary competition second, and twelfth in overall rankings; he did not advance to the quarterfinals.
