= Bartłomiej Bartnicki =

Polish freestyle wrestler

Personal information
- Born: 26 February 1981 (age 45) Bydgoszcz, Poland
- Height: 186 cm (6 ft 1 in)
- Weight: 99 kg (218 lb)

Sport
- Country: Poland
- Sport: Wrestling
- Club: Włókniarz Łódź

Bartłomiej Bartnicki (born 26 February 1981 in Bydgoszcz) is a Polish Freestyle wrestler who competed in the 2008 Summer Olympics in Beijing and in the 2004 Summer Olympics.

At the 2008 Summer Olympics he finished 12th in the super-heavyweight competition (120 kg) in wrestling.
