= Wang Yuanyuan (wrestler) =

Chinese freestyle wrestler (born 1977)

Wang Yuanyuan (simplified Chinese: 王园元; traditional Chinese: 王園元; pinyin: Wáng Yuányuán; born November 16, 1977) is a male Chinese freestyle wrestler who competed at the 2004 Summer Olympics.

He finished sixth in the 96 kg freestyle competition.
