= Aleksey Krupnyakov =

Kyrgyzstani freestyle wrestler

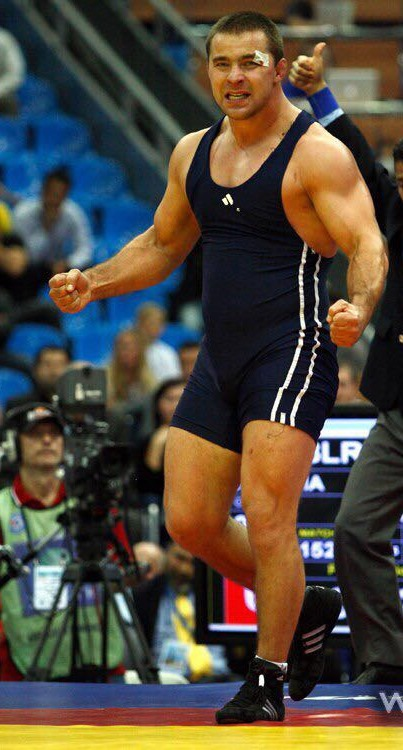

Medal record

Men's Freestyle wrestling

Representing Kyrgyzstan

World Championships
Bronze medal – third place	2005 Budapest	96 kg
Disqualified	2010 Moscow	96 kg

Asian Games
Silver medal – second place	2002 Busan	96 kg
Bronze medal – third place	2006 Doha	96 kg

Asian Championships
Gold medal – first place	2007 Bishkek	96 kg
Silver medal – second place	2004 Tehran	96 kg
Silver medal – second place	2006 Almaty	96 kg

Aleksey Krupnyakov (born May 28, 1978) is a male freestyle wrestler from Kyrgyzstan. He is a two-time Olympyian, competing in both the 2004 Summer Olympics and 2008 Summer Olympics. Krupnyakov originally won his 2nd bronze medal at the Wrestling World Championships in 2010, but was stripped after testing positive for steroids. During his 2-year suspension he competed in MMA, compiling a record of 5-0, finishing all opponents in the 1st round. He returned to wrestling in 2013.
