= 1998 World Wrestling Championships – Men's freestyle 85 kg =

Men's freestyle 85 kg at the 1998 World Championships
- Venue: Azadi Indoor Stadium
- Dates: 9–11 September 1998
- Competitors: 27 from 27 nations

Medalists
gold medal	Alireza Heidari	Iran
silver medal	Magomed Ibragimov	Macedonia
bronze medal	Yoel Romero	Cuba

The men's freestyle 85 kilograms is a competition featured at the 1998 World Wrestling Championships, and was held at the Azadi Indoor Stadium in Tehran, Iran from 9 to 11 September 1998.

== Results ==
Legend

- WO — Won by walkover

=== Round 1 ===
	Score	
Round of 32
Ali Özen (TUR)	0–3	Yang Hyung-mo (KOR)
Gary Holmes (CAN)	0–9	Alireza Heidari (IRI)
Rudolf Vobořil (CZE)	0–8	Tatsuo Kawai (JPN)
Les Gutches (USA)	10–0	Gabriel Szerda (AUS)
Hans Gstöttner (GER)	1–2	Khadzhimurad Magomedov (RUS)
Eldar Assanov (UKR)	1–3	Rasul Katinovasov (UZB)
Jiang Shoutuan (CHN)	3–11	Gocha Chikhradze (GEO)
Davinder Kumar Khatri (IND)	0–3	Robert Eggertswyler (SUI)
Magomed Ibragimov (MKD)	3–0 Fall	Firdovsi Umudov (AZE)
Michał Stanisławski (POL)	1–7	Magomed Kurugliyev (KAZ)
Ganzorigiin Gankhuyag (MGL)	1–3	Aleksandr Maskov (KGZ)
Jalal Baker (SYR)	0–10	Gábor Kapuvári (HUN)
Yoel Romero (CUB)	5–0	Plamen Paskalev (BUL)
Siarhei Borchanka (BLR)		Bye

=== Round 2 ===
	Score	
Round of 16
Siarhei Borchanka (BLR)	1–2	Yang Hyung-mo (KOR)
Alireza Heidari (IRI)	4–2	Tatsuo Kawai (JPN)
Les Gutches (USA)	0–1	Khadzhimurad Magomedov (RUS)
Rasul Katinovasov (UZB)	2–2	Gocha Chikhradze (GEO)
Robert Eggertswyler (SUI)	WO	Magomed Ibragimov (MKD)
Magomed Kurugliyev (KAZ)	1–0	Aleksandr Maskov (KGZ)
Gábor Kapuvári (HUN)	0–5	Yoel Romero (CUB)
Repechage
Ali Özen (TUR)	3–0	Gary Holmes (CAN)
Rudolf Vobořil (CZE)	4–1	Gabriel Szerda (AUS)
Hans Gstöttner (GER)	0–4	Eldar Assanov (UKR)
Jiang Shoutuan (CHN)	7–0	Davinder Kumar Khatri (IND)
Firdovsi Umudov (AZE)	WO	Michał Stanisławski (POL)
Ganzorigiin Gankhuyag (MGL)	10–2 Fall	Jalal Baker (SYR)
Plamen Paskalev (BUL)		Bye

=== Round 3 ===
	Score	
Quarterfinals
Yang Hyung-mo (KOR)	0–1	Alireza Heidari (IRI)
Khadzhimurad Magomedov (RUS)	5–1	Gocha Chikhradze (GEO)
Magomed Ibragimov (MKD)	3–1	Magomed Kurugliyev (KAZ)
Yoel Romero (CUB)		Bye
Repechage
Plamen Paskalev (BUL)	6–5	Ali Özen (TUR)
Rudolf Vobořil (CZE)	0–4 Fall	Eldar Assanov (UKR)
Jiang Shoutuan (CHN)	0–10	Michał Stanisławski (POL)
Ganzorigiin Gankhuyag (MGL)	11–15	Siarhei Borchanka (BLR)
Tatsuo Kawai (JPN)	1–1	Les Gutches (USA)
Rasul Katinovasov (UZB)	6–0	Aleksandr Maskov (KGZ)
Gábor Kapuvári (HUN)		Bye

=== Round 4 ===
	Score	
Repechage
Gábor Kapuvári (HUN)	8–12	Plamen Paskalev (BUL)
Eldar Assanov (UKR)	0–0	Michał Stanisławski (POL)
Siarhei Borchanka (BLR)	0–6	Les Gutches (USA)
Rasul Katinovasov (UZB)	0–3	Yang Hyung-mo (KOR)
Gocha Chikhradze (GEO)	3–3	Magomed Kurugliyev (KAZ)

=== Round 5 ===
	Score	
Semifinals
Yoel Romero (CUB)	1–2	Alireza Heidari (IRI)
Khadzhimurad Magomedov (RUS)	1–3	Magomed Ibragimov (MKD)
Repechage
Plamen Paskalev (BUL)	0–1	Michał Stanisławski (POL)
Les Gutches (USA)	1–1	Yang Hyung-mo (KOR)
Magomed Kurugliyev (KAZ)		Bye

=== Round 6 ===
	Score	
Repechage
Magomed Kurugliyev (KAZ)	4–1	Les Gutches (USA)
Michał Stanisławski (POL)		Bye

=== Round 7 ===
	Score	
Repechage
Yoel Romero (CUB)	5–1	Michał Stanisławski (POL)
Magomed Kurugliyev (KAZ)	0–5	Khadzhimurad Magomedov (RUS)

=== Finals ===
	Score	
Bronze medal match
Yoel Romero (CUB)	3–2	Khadzhimurad Magomedov (RUS)
Final
Alireza Heidari (IRI)	4–0	Magomed Ibragimov (MKD)
