= Alireza Heidari =

Iranian freestyle wrestler

Personal information
- Nationality: Iranian
- Born: March 4, 1976 (age 50) Tehran, Iran
- Height: 186 cm (6 ft 1 in)

Sport
- Country: Iran
- Sport: Wrestling
Medal record
Men's freestyle wrestling
Representing Iran
Olympic Games
Bronze medal – third place	2004 Athens	96 kg
World Championships
Gold medal – first place	1998 Tehran	85 kg
Silver medal – second place	1999 Ankara	97 kg
Silver medal – second place	2002 Tehran	96 kg
Silver medal – second place	2003 New York	96 kg
Bronze medal – third place	1997 Krasnoyarsk	85 kg
Asian Games
Gold medal – first place	1998 Bangkok	85 kg
Gold medal – first place	2002 Busan	96 kg
Gold medal – first place	2006 Doha	96 kg
Asian Championships
Gold medal – first place	1997 Tehran	85 kg
Gold medal – first place	1999 Tashkent	97 kg
Gold medal – first place	2001 Ulaanbaatar	97 kg
Gold medal – first place	2003 New Delhi	96 kg
Bronze medal – third place	1996 Xiaoshan	82 kg

Alireza Heidari (Persian: علیرضا حیدری; born March 4, 1976, in Tehran) is a retired Iranian wrestler who competed in the Men's Freestyle 96 kg at the 2004 Summer Olympics and won the bronze medal.

He also competed in Sydney 2000, where he placed 6th. He is also a seven-time Asian champion and has won a gold medal, three silver medals and a bronze medal at World Championships. Heidari was selected as the 1999 National Sportsman of the Year in Iran.

== Results ==
Result	Round	Opponent	Score
1997 World Championship / (Russia) Krasnoyarsk / (bronze) Bronze medal / 85 kg
Win	Round 1	Christos Alexandridis (GRE)	6–0
Loss	Round 2	Les Gutches (USA)	0–3
Win	Repechage 1	Yang Hyung-mo (KOR)	1–0
Win	Repechage 2	André Backhaus (GER)	8–2
Win	Repechage 3	Nicolae Ghiță (ROU)	6–1, Fall
Win	Repechage 4	Yoel Romero (CUB)	3–1
Win	Bronze medal match	Khadzhimurad Magomedov (RUS)	5–1
1998 World Championship / (Iran) Tehran / (gold) Gold medal / 85 kg
Win	Round 1	Gary Holmes (CAN)	9–0
Win	Round 2	Tatsuo Kawai (JPN)	4–2
Win	Round 3	Yang Hyung-mo (KOR)	1–0
Win	Semifinals	Yoel Romero (CUB)	2–1
Win	Final	Magomed Ibragimov (MKD)	4–0
1999 World Championship / (Turkey) Ankara / (silver) Silver medal / 97 kg
Win	Preliminary round	Dan Karabin (CZE)	10–0
Win	Preliminary round	Kim Kil-soo (KOR)	7–0
Win	Round of 16	Vadim Tasoyev (UKR)	2–0
Win	Quarterfinals	Davud Magomedov (AZE)	5–0
Win	Semifinals	Marek Garmulewicz (POL)	3–0
Loss	Final	Sagid Murtazaliev (RUS)	3–4
2000 Summer Olympics / (Australia) Sydney / 6th place / 97 kg
Win	Preliminary round	Rolf Scherrer (SUI)	7–1
Win	Preliminary round	Ahmet Doğu (TUR)	6–1
Loss	Quarterfinals	Eldar Kurtanidze (GEO)	0–1
Loss	5th place match	Aftantil Xanthopoulos (GRE)	Walkover
2001 World Championship / (Bulgaria) Sofia / 16th place / 97 kg
Win	Preliminary round	Rolf Scherrer (SUI)	6–1
Loss	Preliminary round	Giorgi Gogshelidze (RUS)	1–4, Fall
2002 World Championship / (Iran) Tehran / (silver) Silver medal / 96 kg
Win	Preliminary round	Sofian Abdul-Lateef (IRQ)	11–0
Win	Preliminary round	Chen Dakuan (CHN)	11–0
Win	Preliminary round	Rolf Scherrer (SUI)	3–0
Win	Semifinals	Vadim Tasoyev (UKR)	3–0
Loss	Final	Eldar Kurtanidze (GEO)	1–2
2003 World Championship / (United States) New York / (silver) Silver medal / 96 kg
Win	Preliminary round	Igors Samušonoks (LAT)	10–0
Win	Preliminary round	George Torchinava (NED)	10–0
Win	Round of 16	Aleksandr Shemarov (BLR)	6–6
Win	Quarterfinals	Daniel Cormier (USA)	6–3
Win	Semifinals	Krasimir Kochev (BUL)	3–1
Loss	Final	Eldar Kurtanidze (GEO)	0–4
2004 Summer Olympics / (Greece) Athens / (bronze) Bronze medal / 96 kg
Win	Preliminary round	Eldar Kurtanidze (GEO)	3–2
Win	Preliminary round	Antoine Jaoude (BRA)	10–0
Win	Quarterfinals	Rustam Aghayev (AZE)	5–0
Loss	Semifinals	Magomed Ibragimov (UZB)	4–6
Win	Bronze medal match	Daniel Cormier (USA)	3–2
2006 World Championship / (China) Guangzhou / 5th place / 96 kg
Win	Round of 32	Daniel Cormier (USA)	2–1 (2–0, 0–1, 7–0)
Loss	Round of 16	Giorgi Gogshelidze (GEO)	1–2 (0–2, 1–0, 0–1)
Win	Repechage 1	Norbert Bödör (SVK)	Walkover
Win	Repechage 2	Aleksey Krupnyakov (KGZ)	2–0 (1–1, 2–1)
Loss	Bronze medal match	Ruslan Sheikhau (BLR)	1–2 (1–0, 0–1, 1–1)
