= 1997 World Wrestling Championships – Men's freestyle 85 kg =

Men's freestyle 85 kg at the 1997 World Championships
- Venue: Yenisey Sports Palace
- Dates: 29–31 August 1997
- Competitors: 28 from 28 nations

Medalists
| gold medal | Les Gutches | United States |
| silver medal | Eldar Assanov | Ukraine |
| bronze medal | Alireza Heidari | Iran |

The men's freestyle 85 kilograms is a competition featured at the 1997 World Wrestling Championships, and was held at the Yenisey Sports Palace in Krasnoyarsk, Russia from 29 to 31 August 1997.

== Results ==
Legend

- WO — Won by walkover

=== Round 1 ===
| | Score | |
Round of 32
| José Meléndez (VEN) | 1–12 | Gocha Chikhradze (GEO) |
| Justin Abdou (CAN) | 0–4 | Abil Sultanbekov (KAZ) |
| Ričardas Pauliukonis (LTU) | 1–3 | Eldar Assanov (UKR) |
| Aleksandr Maskov (KGZ) | 3–4 | Agvaansamdangiin Sükhbat (MGL) |
| Soslan Fraev (UZB) | 4–1 | Michał Stanisławski (POL) |
| André Backhaus (GER) | 10–0 | Rob McArthur (AUS) |
| Khadzhimurad Magomedov (RUS) | 2–0 | Ali Rıza Keser (TUR) |
| Yang Hyung-mo (KOR) | 6–0 | Jiang Shoutuan (CHN) |
| Alireza Heidari (IRI) | 6–0 | Christos Alexandridis (GRE) |
| Tatsuo Kawai (JPN) | 0–8 | Les Gutches (USA) |
| Sergey Poltorzhitskiy (BLR) | 1–6 | Plamen Paskalev (BUL) |
| Nicolae Ghiță (ROM) | 2–2 | Magomed Ibragimov (AZE) |
| Roney Loyola (BRA) | 0–6 Fall | Igors Samušonoks (LAT) |
| Gari Modosyan (MKD) | 0–4 | Yoel Romero (CUB) |

=== Round 2 ===
| | Score | |
Round of 16
| Gocha Chikhradze (GEO) | 1–4 | Abil Sultanbekov (KAZ) |
| Eldar Assanov (UKR) | 4–0 | Agvaansamdangiin Sükhbat (MGL) |
| Soslan Fraev (UZB) | 3–2 | André Backhaus (GER) |
| Khadzhimurad Magomedov (RUS) | 2–2 | Yang Hyung-mo (KOR) |
| Alireza Heidari (IRI) | 0–3 | Les Gutches (USA) |
| Plamen Paskalev (BUL) | 4–1 | Nicolae Ghiță (ROM) |
| Igors Samušonoks (LAT) | 1–3 | Yoel Romero (CUB) |
Repechage
| José Meléndez (VEN) | 0–5 Fall | Ričardas Pauliukonis (LTU) |
| Aleksandr Maskov (KGZ) | 3–5 | Michał Stanisławski (POL) |
| Rob McArthur (AUS) | 0–8 | Ali Rıza Keser (TUR) |
| Jiang Shoutuan (CHN) | 2–6 | Christos Alexandridis (GRE) |
| Tatsuo Kawai (JPN) | 2–0 | Sergey Poltorzhitskiy (BLR) |
| Magomed Ibragimov (AZE) | 10–0 Fall | Roney Loyola (BRA) |
| Gari Modosyan (MKD) | | Bye |

=== Round 3 ===
| | Score | |
Quarterfinals
| Abil Sultanbekov (KAZ) | 2–3 | Eldar Assanov (UKR) |
| Soslan Fraev (UZB) | 1–5 | Khadzhimurad Magomedov (RUS) |
| Les Gutches (USA) | 8–0 | Plamen Paskalev (BUL) |
| Yoel Romero (CUB) | | Bye |
Repechage
| Gari Modosyan (MKD) | 5–1 | Ričardas Pauliukonis (LTU) |
| Michał Stanisławski (POL) | 2–0 | Ali Rıza Keser (TUR) |
| Christos Alexandridis (GRE) | 2–3 | Tatsuo Kawai (JPN) |
| Magomed Ibragimov (AZE) | 6–4 Fall | Gocha Chikhradze (GEO) |
| Agvaansamdangiin Sükhbat (MGL) | 1–4 | André Backhaus (GER) |
| Yang Hyung-mo (KOR) | 0–1 | Alireza Heidari (IRI) |
| Nicolae Ghiță (ROM) | 4–3 Fall | Igors Samušonoks (LAT) |

=== Round 4 ===
| | Score | |
Repechage
| Gari Modosyan (MKD) | 2–3 | Michał Stanisławski (POL) |
| Tatsuo Kawai (JPN) | 0–3 | Magomed Ibragimov (AZE) |
| André Backhaus (GER) | 2–8 | Alireza Heidari (IRI) |
| Nicolae Ghiță (ROM) | 4–1 | Abil Sultanbekov (KAZ) |
| Soslan Fraev (UZB) | 5–4 | Plamen Paskalev (BUL) |

=== Round 5 ===
| | Score | |
Semifinals
| Yoel Romero (CUB) | 1–3 | Eldar Assanov (UKR) |
| Khadzhimurad Magomedov (RUS) | 2–3 | Les Gutches (USA) |
Repechage
| Michał Stanisławski (POL) | 0–3 | Magomed Ibragimov (AZE) |
| Alireza Heidari (IRI) | 6–1 Fall | Nicolae Ghiță (ROM) |
| Soslan Fraev (UZB) | | Bye |

=== Round 6 ===
| | Score | |
Repechage
| Soslan Fraev (UZB) | 1–2 | Magomed Ibragimov (AZE) |
| Alireza Heidari (IRI) | | Bye |

=== Round 7 ===
| | Score | |
Repechage
| Yoel Romero (CUB) | 1–3 | Alireza Heidari (IRI) |
| Magomed Ibragimov (AZE) | 1–6 | Khadzhimurad Magomedov (RUS) |

=== Finals ===
| | Score | |
5th place match
| Yoel Romero (CUB) | WO | Magomed Ibragimov (AZE) |
Bronze medal match
| Alireza Heidari (IRI) | 5–1 | Khadzhimurad Magomedov (RUS) |
Final
| Eldar Assanov (UKR) | 1–1 | Les Gutches (USA) |
