= 1999 World Wrestling Championships – Men's freestyle 85 kg =

Men's freestyle 85 kg at the 1999 World Championships
- Venue: Atatürk Sport Hall
- Dates: 8–10 October 1999
- Competitors: 37 from 37 nations

Medalists
gold medal	Yoel Romero	Cuba
silver medal	Khadzhimurad Magomedov	Russia
bronze medal	Les Gutches	United States

The men's freestyle 85 kilograms is a competition featured at the 1999 World Wrestling Championships, and was held at the Atatürk Sport Hall in Ankara, Turkey from 8 to 10 October 1999.

== Results ==
=== Preliminary round ===
==== Pool 1 ====
Pos	Athlete	Pld	W	L	CP	TP	RUS	SUI	GRE
1	Khadzhimurad Magomedov (RUS)	2	2	0	7	21	—	14–1	7–0
2	Grégory Martinetti (SUI)	2	1	1	4	8	1–4 SP	—	7–4
3	Christos Alexandridis (GRE)	2	0	2	1	4	0–3 PO	1–3 PP	—

Source: Official website

==== Pool 2 ====
Pos	Athlete	Pld	W	L	CP	TP	UKR	POL	PUR
1	Davyd Bichinashvili (UKR)	2	2	0	7	19	—	10–0	9–5
2	Michał Stanisławski (POL)	2	1	1	3	2	0–4 ST	—	2–1
3	Matt White (PUR)	2	0	2	2	6	1–3 PP	1–3 PP	—

Source: Official website

==== Pool 3 ====
Pos	Athlete	Pld	W	L	CP	TP	ARM	JPN	CHN
1	Mamed Aghaev (ARM)	2	2	0	7	16	—	6–1	10–0
2	Tatsuo Kawai (JPN)	2	1	1	5	6	1–3 PP	—	5–0 Fall
3	Chen Long (CHN)	2	0	2	0	0	0–4 ST	0–4 TO	—

Source: Official website

==== Pool 4 ====
Pos	Athlete	Pld	W	L	CP	TP	KOR	CIV	CYP
1	Yang Hyung-mo (KOR)	2	2	0	7	13	—	2–1	11–0
2	Vincent Aka-Akesse (CIV)	2	1	1	5	14	1–3 PP	—	13–1 Fall
3	Michael Michaelides (CYP)	2	0	2	0	1	0–4 ST	0–4 TO	—

Source: Official website

==== Pool 5 ====
Pos	Athlete	Pld	W	L	CP	TP	MKD	LAT	CAN
1	Magomed Ibragimov (MKD)	2	2	0	7	8	—	8–2	WO
2	Igors Samušonoks (LAT)	2	1	1	5	13	1–3 PP	—	11–0
3	Gary Holmes (CAN)	2	0	2	0	0	0–4 PA	0–4 ST	—

Source: Official website

==== Pool 6 ====
Pos	Athlete	Pld	W	L	CP	TP	USA	LTU	CZE
1	Les Gutches (USA)	2	2	0	7	16	—	7–0	9–0 Fall
2	Egidijus Vielavičius (LTU)	2	1	1	3	5	0–3 PO	—	5–4
3	Rudolf Vobořil (CZE)	2	0	2	1	4	0–4 TO	1–3 PP	—

Source: Official website

==== Pool 7 ====
Pos	Athlete	Pld	W	L	CP	TP	UKR	ROM	AUS
1	Rasul Katinovasov (UZB)	2	2	0	7	8	—	4–2	4–0 Fall
2	Nicolae Ghiță (ROM)	2	1	1	5	14	1–3 PP	—	12–1 Fall
3	Gabriel Szerda (AUS)	2	0	2	0	1	0–4 TO	0–4 TO	—

Source: Official website

==== Pool 8 ====
Pos	Athlete	Pld	W	L	CP	TP	GEO	IND	NED
1	Gocha Chikhradze (GEO)	2	2	0	7	19	—	9–0 Fall	10–3
2	Anuj Chaudhary (IND)	2	1	1	3	8	0–4 TO	—	8–6
3	George Torchinava (NED)	2	0	2	2	9	1–3 PP	1–3 PP	—

Source: Official website

==== Pool 9 ====
Pos	Athlete	Pld	W	L	CP	TP	AZE	KGZ	MGL
1	Vitaly Gizoev (AZE)	2	2	0	7	13	—	3–2	10–0
2	Bolotbek Omurakunov (KGZ)	2	1	1	4	8	1–3 PP	—	6–4
3	Ganzorigiin Gankhuyag (MGL)	2	0	2	1	4	0–4 ST	1–3 PP	—

Source: Official website

==== Pool 10 ====
Pos	Athlete	Pld	W	L	CP	TP	CUB	IRI	GER
1	Yoel Romero (CUB)	2	2	0	6	12	—	4–0	8–4
2	Abbas Majidi (IRI)	2	1	1	3	6	0–3 PO	—	6–1
3	André Backhaus (GER)	2	0	2	2	5	1–3 PP	1–3 PP	—

Source: Official website

==== Pool 11 ====
Pos	Athlete	Pld	W	L	CP	TP	KAZ	HUN	EST
1	Magomed Kurugliyev (KAZ)	2	2	0	7	18	—	7–4	11–0
2	Gábor Kapuvári (HUN)	2	1	1	4	9	1–3 PP	—	5–0
3	Neeme Jaanson (EST)	2	0	2	0	0	0–4 ST	0–3 PO	—

Source: Official website

==== Pool 12 ====
Pos	Athlete	Pld	W	L	CP	TP	BUL	TUR	GBR	SVK
1	Plamen Penev (BUL)	3	2	1	7	13	—	0–1	10–0	3–0
2	Ali Özen (TUR)	3	2	1	6	7	3–0 PO	—	3–4 Fall	3–0
3	Luigi Bianco (GBR)	3	1	2	5	9	0–4 ST	4–0 TO	—	5–15
4	Radovan Valach (SVK)	3	1	2	4	15	0–3 PO	0–3 PO	4–1 SP	—

Source: Official website

=== Knockout round ===
Round of 16
Khadzhimurad Magomedov (RUS)	3
Davyd Bichinashvili (UKR)	2
Mamed Aghaev (ARM)	3
Yang Hyung-mo (KOR)	4
Magomed Ibragimov (MKD)	3
Les Gutches (USA)	4
Rasul Katinovasov (UZB)	4
Gocha Chikhradze (GEO)	3
Vitaly Gizoev (AZE)	0
Yoel Romero (CUB)	7
Magomed Kurugliyev (KAZ)	6
Plamen Penev (BUL)	4
Tatsuo Kawai (JPN)	9
Vincent Aka-Akesse (CIV)	4
Nicolae Ghiță (ROM)	2
Ali Özen (TUR)	4

Quarterfinals
Khadzhimurad Magomedov (RUS)	3
Yang Hyung-mo (KOR)	0
Les Gutches (USA)	5
Rasul Katinovasov (UZB)	1
Yoel Romero (CUB)	3
Magomed Kurugliyev (KAZ)	0
Tatsuo Kawai (JPN)	2
Ali Özen (TUR)	3

Semifinals
Khadzhimurad Magomedov (RUS)	2
Les Gutches (USA)	0
Yoel Romero (CUB)	3
Ali Özen (TUR)	2

Final
Khadzhimurad Magomedov (RUS)	2
Yoel Romero (CUB)	4
Bronze medal match
Les Gutches (USA)	4
Ali Özen (TUR)	2
