= Yoel Romero =

Cuban Olympic wrestler and mixed martial artist (born 1977)

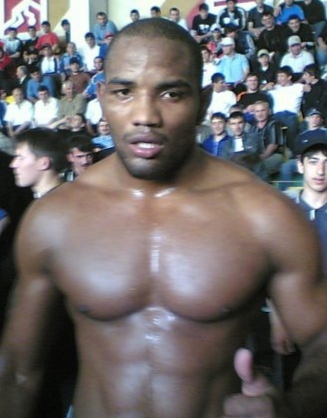
- Romero in 2008
- Born: Yoel Romero Palacio; April 30, 1977 (age 49); Pinar del Río, Cuba
- Other names: Soldier of God
- Nationality: Cuban; American
- Height: 5 ft 10 in (178 cm)
- Weight: 205 lb (93 kg; 14 st 9 lb)
- Division: Light heavyweight (2009–2011, 2021–present); Middleweight (2013–2020)
- Reach: 73 in (185 cm)
- Style: Wrestling
- Fighting out of: Coconut Creek, Florida, U.S.
- Team: American Top Team
- Wrestling: Olympic Freestyle Wrestling
- Years active: 2009–present (MMA); 1997–2005, 2007, 2025-Present (freestyle wrestling)

Mixed martial arts record
- Total: 24
- Wins: 17
- By knockout: 14
- By decision: 3
- Losses: 7
- By knockout: 1
- By decision: 6

Other information
- Mixed martial arts record from Sherdog

Yoel Romero Palacio (born April 30, 1977) is a Cuban professional mixed martial artist and freestyle wrestler who currently competes in the Light Heavyweight division. Romero formerly competed in the Middleweight division of the Ultimate Fighting Championship (UFC), where he was a challenger for the UFC Middleweight Championship, in Bellator MMA where he was a challenger for the Bellator Light Heavyweight World Championship, and in Strikeforce.

Romero competes in the Light Heavyweight division of Real American Freestyle (RAF), where he was formerly interim RAF Light Heavyweight Champion. As a freestyle wrestler, Romero previously competed at 85 kilograms, where he was the 1999 World Champion (five-time medalist at the World Championships), the 2000 Olympic Silver medalist, a three-time World Cup winner (six-time medalist), the 2003 Pan American Games Gold medalist (bronze medalist in 1999) and a five-time Pan American Champion.

== Wrestling career ==
Romero started training in wrestling in the 1990s, eventually representing Cuba at senior level in the FILA Wrestling World Championships, which is held in non-Olympic years, from 1997 to 2005. At the 1999 World Wrestling Championships Romero became world champion by defeating the 1996 Olympic gold medalist, Khadzhimurad Magomedov of Russia. He missed out on becoming world champion again in 2002. After landing a three-point throw against Adam Saitiev to take a 3–2 lead, Romero was penalized a point for passivity with 20 seconds remaining. In overtime, after a scramble that saw Romero end on top, it was judged Saitiev had scored in the interim.

Romero competed in the 2000 Summer Olympics and the 2004 Summer Olympics, representing his home nation of Cuba. He won the silver medal in the 2000 freestyle competition, losing to Adam Saitiev in the finals. He finished in fourth place in 2004. While competing in freestyle wrestling, Romero has defeated three Olympic gold medal winners, and five different world champions. Among them were Americans Cael Sanderson and Les Gutches, both of whom Romero has multiple victories over.

Romero medaled in five world championships, only missing out with his fifth-place finish in 1997, and a sixth-place finish in 2003, when he was battling injuries. Other notable achievements include a gold medal at the 2003 Pan American Games, a quadrennial competition held the year before the Olympics, as well as multiple medal-winning finishes at the FILA Wrestling World Cup. Romero competed infrequently after 2005: he was suspended for all of 2006 by the Cuban Wrestling Federation for allegedly throwing his match against Mindorashvili at the 2005 World Championships. After winning the Grand Prix of Germany in the summer of 2007, he did not return to Cuba, choosing instead to remain in Germany.

Romero then joined the Ringer-Bundesliga, a professional wrestling league in Germany, in which teams compete for team titles. Romero competed as a starting member of SV Johannis Nuremberg, as well as helping coach and train the team. Eventually he began to transition into MMA.

== Mixed martial arts career ==
=== Early career ===
After defecting to Germany in 2007, Romero made his professional mixed martial arts debut in December 2009. From 2008 to 2011, Romero was trained by Serge Kuftin (combat sambo & MMA coach) and Zike Simic (kickboxing coach), both of whom were from Peter Althof's "Martial Arts Gym Nürnberg". Over the three years, Romero amassed a record of 5–0 in various promotions in Germany and Poland.

Romero won his debut via TKO against Sascha Weinpolter. In his second bout, he scored a 62-second finish via TKO against Ricky Pulu. He then took on Polish standout Michał Fijałka in his third bout. Romero won in the third round via TKO, which was at first ruled a controversial disqualification, due to a knee on the ground thrown by Romero. In 2011, he won his next three fights via TKO in the first round.

=== Strikeforce ===
Romero signed with Strikeforce in July 2011 and made his promotional debut against Rafael Cavalcante on September 10, 2011, at Strikeforce 36. He lost the fight via KO in the second round. A neck injury (a neck break to his C4 vertebra) kept him out of action until 2013.

=== Ultimate Fighting Championship ===
==== 2013 ====
After Strikeforce was purchased and absorbed by the UFC, Romero made his promotional and middleweight debut against Clifford Starks on April 20, 2013, at UFC on Fox 7. He won the fight via flying knee knockout in the first round. This win earned him Knockout of the Night honors.

Romero was expected to face Derek Brunson on August 31, 2013, at UFC 164. However, Brunson suffered an injury and pulled out of the bout. Promotional newcomer Brian Houston was briefly linked as a replacement, however Houston was not medically cleared to compete at the event and the bout was canceled. In his second UFC bout, Romero faced Ronny Markes on November 6, 2013, at UFC Fight Night 31. He won the fight via knockout in the third round.

==== 2014 ====
For his third fight, Romero was again set to face Derek Brunson on January 15, 2014, at UFC Fight Night 35. After trailing for two rounds, Romero won the fight in the third via TKO due to punches and elbows to Brunson's body. Both fighters earned a $50,000 a Fight of the Night bonus award.

In his fourth fight, Romero faced Brad Tavares at UFC on Fox 11. He won the fight via unanimous decision.

Romero faced Tim Kennedy on September 27, 2014, at UFC 178. He won the fight via TKO in the third round, giving Kennedy his first stoppage loss in thirteen years. This fight generated much controversy: Romero was hurt badly at the end of round 2, and received extra time to recover between rounds. UFC color commentator Joe Rogan mistakenly blamed this on Romero's cornermen for failing to leave the Octagon on time, when the blame was actually on a UFC Cutman who applied too much Vaseline to a cut and referee John McCarthy for allowing Romero to stay sitting while trying to get the cutman to return to the octagon to wipe the excess off. Later it was also noticed that Kennedy was illegally holding Romero's glove while striking him at end of round 2.

The win earned Romero his second Fight of the Night bonus award.

==== 2015 ====
Romero was expected to face Ronaldo Souza on February 28, 2015, at UFC 184. However, Souza pulled out of the fight on January 15, 2015, due to pneumonia. The bout was rescheduled for April 18, 2015, at UFC on Fox 15. However, Romero was forced out of the fight by a ligament and meniscus tear in his knee. He was replaced by Chris Camozzi.

Romero faced former light heavyweight champion Lyoto Machida on June 27, 2015, at UFC Fight Night 70. This was the first UFC event, headlining Romero in the main event. He knocked out Machida at 1:38 of the third round with a series of elbows from top position. Romero was awarded a "Performance of the Night" bonus.

The bout with Ronaldo Souza was scheduled for a third time, eventually taking place on December 12, 2015, at UFC 194. Romero won the fight via split decision. 2 of 17 media outlets scored the bout in favor of Romero.

==== 2016 ====
Romero faced former middleweight champion Chris Weidman on November 12, 2016, at UFC 205. He won the fight via knockout in the third round and was awarded a Performance of the Night bonus. It was announced that Romero was next-in-line for a title shot, after owning an 8-match winning streak.

==== 2017 ====
With middleweight champion Michael Bisping sidelined due to injury, Romero fought Robert Whittaker on July 8, 2017, at UFC 213 for the interim UFC Middleweight Championship. Romero lost the fight by unanimous decision. This fight earned him another Fight of the Night award.

==== 2018 ====
Romero was scheduled to face David Branch on February 24, 2018, at UFC on Fox 28. However, on January 13, 2018, it was reported that Whittaker had pulled out of his bout against Luke Rockhold, which was scheduled to take place at UFC 221, due to an undisclosed injury. It was announced he would be replaced by Romero in what was to be a fight for the interim UFC Middleweight Championship. The winner of this bout would then face Whittaker in a unification bout. At the weigh-ins, Romero came in at 188.3 lbs in his first attempt. He was given another two hours to make 185 lbs but failed to make weight, ending up 2.7 pounds over the middleweight limit of 185 lbs. As a result, Romero would not have been eligible for the interim championship had he won the fight. Romero was fined 30% of his purse, which was awarded to Rockhold. If Rockhold were to win, he would still be awarded the championship. Romero won the fight via KO in the third round. Romero knocked Rockhold down with a heavy overhand followed up with a punch on the ground that rendered Rockhold unconscious.

A rematch with Whittaker took place on June 9, 2018, at UFC 225. At the weight-ins, Romero missed weight, coming in at 186 pounds, 1 pound over the middleweight limit for a title fight. Romero was given additional time to make weight but was pulled by the commission, weighing in at 185.2 lbs, 0.2 pounds over. Romero was fined 20% of his fight purse and the fight proceeded as a non-title catchweight bout. Romero lost the back-and-forth fight by a close split decision. The fight was awarded as Fight of the Night, but due to Romero missing weight, Whittaker received both $50,000 bonuses for a total of $100,000.

==== 2019 ====
Romero was scheduled to face Paulo Costa on November 3, 2018, at UFC 230. However, Romero indicated in mid-August that while he has been cleared to fight, his doctors have recommended that he wait another four to five months (early 2019) to allow facial injuries incurred during his most recent fight to fully heal.

Romero was scheduled to face Ronaldo Souza on April 27, 2019, at UFC Fight Night 150. However, it was reported that Romero pulled out of the bout in early in April 2019 due to illness and was replaced by Jack Hermansson.

Romero faced Paulo Costa on August 17, 2019, at UFC 241. After trailing for the first two rounds, he dominated the third round in one of the greatest 3-round fights in the history of the UFC. As he fell back in the numbers, he lost the fight via unanimous decision. This fight earned him the Fight of the Night award.

==== 2020 ====
Romero next faced Israel Adesanya on March 7, 2020 UFC 248 for the UFC middleweight title. He lost the fight via unanimous decision. Many fans and pundits felt disappointed due to the low activity by both fighters, which resulted in a largely uneventful fight in which neither fighter was able to deliver any significant offense.

Romero was scheduled to face Uriah Hall on August 22, 2020, at UFC on ESPN 15. However, Romero pulled out of the fight on August 11 for undisclosed reasons. The bout was subsequently cancelled.

On December 4, Romero announced his departure from the UFC and became a free agent.

=== Bellator MMA ===
On December 14, 2020, it was announced that Romero had agreed to a multi-fight deal with Bellator MMA and was expected to compete in its light heavyweight division beginning in 2021.

On February 9, 2021, it was announced that Romero would be participating in the Bellator Light Heavyweight World Grand Prix Tournament. He was scheduled to face Anthony Johnson in the quarterfinal round at Bellator 257 on April 16. On March 26, it was announced that the bout would be moved to Bellator 258 on May 7. On April 29, it was announced that Yoel had failed his medicals due to an eye issue and the bout was pulled from the card, and the Grand Prix Tournament, being replaced by Jose Augusto.

Romero made his Bellator debut on September 18, 2021, at Bellator 266 against Phil Davis. He lost the bout via split decision.

Romero was scheduled to fight Melvin Manhoef on May 6, 2022, at Bellator 280. However, Manhoef withdrew from the bout due to a hand injury while stopping burglars and was replaced by Alex Polizzi. Yoel won the bout via TKO in the final seconds of the third round.

The bout against Melvin Manhoef was rescheduled this time for September 23, 2022, at Bellator 285. Romero won the bout by knockout on the ground via elbows in the third round.

Romero was scheduled to face Vadim Nemkov for the Bellator Light Heavyweight World Championship on February 4, 2023, at Bellator 290. However, Nemkov was forced to withdraw due to undisclosed reason and the bout was scrapped.

Romero faced Vadim Nemkov for the Bellator Light Heavyweight World Championship on June 16, 2023, at Bellator 297. He lost the fight via unanimous decision.

Romero faced Thiago Santos on February 24, 2024, at PFL vs. Bellator. He won the bout by unanimous decision.

=== Global Fight League ===
On January 16, 2025, it was announced that he had left the promotion and signed with the Global Fight League.

Romero was scheduled to face Maurício Rua at a to be announced date and location. However, Rua withdrew for unknown reasons and was replaced by former two-time Bellator Middleweight World Champion Gegard Mousasi. In turn, all GFL events were cancelled indefinitely.

== Grappling career ==
Romero competed against future UFC Heavyweight fighter Chris Barnett in a submission grappling match hosted by Dean Toole Promotions on June 15, 2019. Despite giving up a weight advantage to his opponent, Romero outwrestled Barnett before taking top position and submitting him with a kimura at 3:50 of the match.

Romero was to compete against Owen Livesey in an openweight match at Polaris 28 on June 15, 2024. Romero had to withdraw from the match and was replaced by Baissangour Chamsoudinov.

== Boxing ==
Romero competed in Mike Perry's "Dirty Boxing Championship" against Power Slap athlete Duane Crespo on November 23, 2024. He won by first-round knockout.

Romero competed at "Dirty Boxing"'s DBX1 event against former Bellator MMA fighter Ras Hylton in the main event on March 22, 2025. He won the fight by technical knockout in the third round.

== Bare knuckle boxing ==
In July 2025, Conor McGregor announced that Romero had signed with the Bare Knuckle Fighting Championship.

On September 12, 2025, Romero made his debut at BKFC 80 against Theo Doukas and won by technical knockout in the second round.

Romero was scheduled to face current BKFC Light Heavyweight World Champion and former Cruiserweight World Champion Lorenzo Hunt in a heavyweight bout on February 7, 2026 at BKFC Knucklemania VI. On January 27, 2026, it was announced that Romero withdrew due to illness.

In March 2026, Romero faced Russian fighter Vagab Vagabov in a five-round bare-knuckle bout at IBA Bare Knuckle 4 in Saint Petersburg. Vagabov won by unanimous decision in a closely contested and controversial fight.

Romero faced Darren Till on September 26, 2026 at BKFC 94. Romero lost to Till by unanimous decision.

== Training ==
Romero trains in Coconut Creek, Florida, with the American Top Team, with fellow fighters including Robbie Lawler, Thiago Alves, Thiago Silva and Glover Teixeira.

== Fighting style ==
Romero is left-handed and primarily fights out of the southpaw stance, although he sometimes switches to an orthodox stance during fights. In spite of his Olympic wrestling pedigree, Romero rarely uses his wrestling offensively inside the Octagon. Instead, Romero's boxing is typically considered his best skill, with the majority of his victories coming by way of knockout or technical knockout via punches. Many pundits cite Romero's pull-back left-handed counter as his most dangerous strike. Romero's boxing defense includes the use of the cross-armed guard.

== Tainted supplements lawsuit ==
Romero was informed of a potential doping violation stemming from an out-of-competition test conducted by USADA on January 13, 2016 after his bout with Ronaldo Souza on December 12, 2015, at UFC 194, which Romero won via split decision. On February 8, Romero and his manager explained that he had taken a supplement after his fight that turned out to be contaminated. His team and USADA both sent out the supplement for testing and it was confirmed that it contained a banned substance. That substance was not listed on the label, his manager said. They did not want to reveal the name of the supplement or the substance as USADA was investigating the issue. On March 23, it was announced that Romero would appeal his suspension. His team and USADA discussed a deal for a nine-month suspension for the fighter, but Romero preferred to go to arbitration. The typical USADA anti-doping violation suspension is two years. Eventually, on April 4, both parties reached an agreement for a six-month suspension. USADA revealed that Romero had tested positive for ibutamoren, a growth hormone release stimulator. An unopened version of the supplement was independently tested and the banned substance did indeed come up, even though it was not listed on the label. The result of the Souza fight was not overturned, as it was an out-of-competition test that occurred after the fight; Romero passed both his pre-fight and fight night tests for the Souza fight.

Romero pursued legal action against the supplement company, but they never gave an answer. After being awarded default judgment, Romero was awarded $27 million in damages: $3 million for lost wages, $3 million for reputable harm, and $3 million for emotional damage, all of which were tripled as allowed by the New Jersey “Consumer Fraud Act” when a company is “found out to have committed consumer fraud”. However, in mid-2021 it was reported that New Jersey Superior Court reduced the damage awards for lost wages and emotional stress to total of $12.45 million. The reputational damages will be decided in another trial meeting.

== Personal life ==
Romero describes himself as a Christian and "a man of God" whose hero is Jesus Christ. His younger brother, Yoan Pablo Hernández, was the IBF Cruiserweight Champion in professional boxing.

Romero and his wife have one daughter, he also has two daughters and a son in Cuba.

In a controversial post-fight interview after his victory over Lyoto Machida at UFC Fight Night 70, it was assumed by many that Romero was expressing disagreement with the Obergefell v. Hodges supreme court ruling. However, during the post fight press conference and subsequent interviews the following day, Romero denied referring to gay marriage and apologized for his comments while maintaining that they were misunderstood. Many thought Romero said "No for gay Jesus" while he actually said "No forget Jesus" as he is not fluent in English.

== Championships and accomplishments ==
=== Mixed martial arts ===
- Ultimate Fighting Championship
  - Knockout of the Night (One time) vs. Clifford Starks
  - Performance of the Night (Two times) vs. Lyoto Machida and Chris Weidman
  - Fight of the Night (Five times) vs. Derek Brunson, Tim Kennedy, Robert Whittaker (x2), and Paulo Costa
  - Tied (Israel Adesanya) for the third most Post-Fight bonuses in UFC Middleweight division history (8)
  - Tied (Robert Whittaker & Anthony Hernandez) for fifth longest win streak in UFC Middleweight division history (8)
  - Tied (Michael Bisping, Derek Brunson, Gregory Rodrigues & Chris Leben) for fourth most knockouts in UFC Middleweight division history (7)
  - Tied (Roman Kopylov) for fifth most knockdowns landed in UFC Middleweight division history (10)
  - UFC Honors Awards
    - 2019: President's Choice Fight of the Year Nominee vs. Paulo Costa
  - UFC.com Awards
    - 2013: Ranked #10 Import of the Year
    - 2016: Ranked #10 Knockout of the Year vs. Chris Weidman
    - 2018: Fight of the Year vs. Robert Whittaker 2 & Ranked #6 Knockout of the Year vs. Luke Rockhold
    - 2019: Ranked #3 Fight of the Year vs. Paulo Costa
- ESPN
  - 2016 Knockout of the Year vs. Chris Weidman at UFC 205
- MMA DNA.nl
  - 2018 Fight of the Year vs. Robert Whittaker 2 at UFC 225
- MMA Junkie
  - 2019 August Fight of the Month vs. Paulo Costa at UFC 241
- CBS Sports
  - 2017 #5 Ranked UFC Fight of the Year vs. Robert Whittaker at UFC 213
  - 2018 #5 Ranked UFC Fight of the Year vs. Robert Whittaker 2 at UFC 225
  - 2018 #4 Ranked UFC Knockout of the Year vs. Luke Rockhold
- Bloody Elbow
  - 2018 Fight of the Year vs. Robert Whittaker 2 at UFC 225
- Cageside Press
  - 2018 Fight of the Year vs. Robert Whittaker 2 at UFC 225

== Mixed martial arts record ==
Professional record breakdown
24 matches	17 wins	7 losses
By knockout	14	1
By decision	3	6

Res.	Record	Opponent	Method	Event	Date	Round	Time	Location	Notes
Win	17–7	Alex Nicholson	TKO (submission to punches)	Gamebred Bareknuckle MMA 10	May 1, 2026	1	1:11	Miami, Florida, United States	Bare knuckle MMA.
Win	16–7	Thiago Santos	Decision (unanimous)	PFL vs. Bellator	February 24, 2024	3	5:00	Riyadh, Saudi Arabia	
Loss	15–7	Vadim Nemkov	Decision (unanimous)	Bellator 297	June 16, 2023	5	5:00	Chicago, Illinois, United States	For the Bellator Light Heavyweight World Championship.
Win	15–6	Melvin Manhoef	KO (elbows)	Bellator 285	September 23, 2022	3	3:34	Dublin, Ireland	
Win	14–6	Alex Polizzi	TKO (punches)	Bellator 280	May 6, 2022	3	4:59	Paris, France	
Loss	13–6	Phil Davis	Decision (split)	Bellator 266	September 18, 2021	3	5:00	San Jose, California, United States	Return to Light Heavyweight.
Loss	13–5	Israel Adesanya	Decision (unanimous)	UFC 248	March 7, 2020	5	5:00	Las Vegas, Nevada, United States	For the UFC Middleweight Championship.
Loss	13–4	Paulo Costa	Decision (unanimous)	UFC 241	August 17, 2019	3	5:00	Anaheim, California, United States	Fight of the Night.
Loss	13–3	Robert Whittaker	Decision (split)	UFC 225	June 9, 2018	5	5:00	Chicago, Illinois, United States	Non-title bout; Romero missed weight (185.2 lb). Fight of the Night.
Win	13–2	Luke Rockhold	KO (punches)	UFC 221	February 11, 2018	3	1:48	Perth, Australia	For the interim UFC Middleweight Championship. Romero missed weight (187.7 lb) and was ineligible for the title.
Loss	12–2	Robert Whittaker	Decision (unanimous)	UFC 213	July 8, 2017	5	5:00	Las Vegas, Nevada, United States	For the interim UFC Middleweight Championship. Fight of the Night.
Win	12–1	Chris Weidman	KO (flying knee)	UFC 205	November 12, 2016	3	0:24	New York City, New York, United States	Performance of the Night.
Win	11–1	Ronaldo Souza	Decision (split)	UFC 194	December 12, 2015	3	5:00	Las Vegas, Nevada, United States	
Win	10–1	Lyoto Machida	KO (elbows)	UFC Fight Night: Machida vs. Romero	June 27, 2015	3	1:38	Hollywood, Florida, United States	Performance of the Night.
Win	9–1	Tim Kennedy	TKO (punches)	UFC 178	September 27, 2014	3	0:58	Las Vegas, Nevada, United States	Fight of the Night.
Win	8–1	Brad Tavares	Decision (unanimous)	UFC on Fox: Werdum vs. Browne	April 19, 2014	3	5:00	Orlando, Florida, United States	
Win	7–1	Derek Brunson	TKO (punches and elbows)	UFC Fight Night: Rockhold vs. Philippou	January 15, 2014	3	3:23	Duluth, Georgia, United States	Fight of the Night.
Win	6–1	Ronny Markes	KO (punches)	UFC: Fight for the Troops 3	November 6, 2013	3	1:39	Fort Campbell, Kentucky, United States	
Win	5–1	Clifford Starks	KO (flying knee and punches)	UFC on Fox: Henderson vs. Melendez	April 20, 2013	1	1:32	San Jose, California, United States	Middleweight debut. Knockout of the Night.
Loss	4–1	Rafael Cavalcante	KO (punches)	Strikeforce: Barnett vs. Kharitonov	September 10, 2011	2	4:51	Cincinnati, Ohio, United States	
Win	4–0	Laszlo Eck	KO (punch)	Fight of the Night 2011	May 27, 2011	1	0:33	Greding, Germany	
Win	3–0	Ņikita Petrovs	TKO (retirement)	Superior FC 4	March 5, 2011	1	2:58	Giessen, Germany	
Win	2–0	Michał Fijałka	TKO (retirement)	Infinite Fighting Federation: The Eternal Struggle	October 8, 2010	3	4:05	Dąbrowa Górnicza, Poland	
Win	1–0	Sascha Weinpolter	TKO (punches)	Fight of the Night 2009	December 20, 2009	1	0:48	Nuremberg, Germany	Light Heavyweight debut.

== Pay-per-view bouts ==
No.	Event	Fight	Date	Venue	City	PPV buys
1.	UFC 213	Romero vs. Whittaker	July 8, 2017	T-Mobile Arena	Paradise, Nevada, United States	150,000
2.	UFC 221	Romero vs. Rockhold	February 11, 2018	Perth Arena	Perth, Australia	130,000
3.	UFC 225	Whittaker vs. Romero 2	June 9, 2018	United Center	Chicago, Illinois, United States	250,000
4.	UFC 248	Adesanya vs. Romero	March 7, 2020	T-Mobile Arena	Paradise, Nevada, United States	Not Disclosed

== Freestyle record ==
Freestyle Matches
Res.	Record	Opponent	Score	Date	Event	Location
Loss	34–12	(United States) Stephen Buchanan	Tech. Fall 0–10	January 10, 2026	RAF 05	(United States) Sunrise, Florida
RAF 04 205 lb (Won Interim RAF Light Heavyweight Championship)
Win	34–11	(United States) Pat Downey	Tech. Fall 12–0	December 20, 2025	RAF 04	(United States) Fishers, Indiana
2005 World Championships (silver) at 84kg
Loss	33–11	(Georgia (country)) Revaz Mindorashvili	0–1, 1–1, 0–5	September 26 - October 2, 2005	2005 World Wrestling Championships	Budapest, Hungary
Win	33–10	(Ukraine) Taras Danko	3–1, 1–0	September 26 - October 2, 2005	2005 World Wrestling Championships	Budapest, Hungary
Win	32–10	(Belarus) Soslan Gattsiev	1–0, 2–0	September 26 - October 2, 2005	2005 World Wrestling Championships	Budapest, Hungary
Win	31–10	(Poland) Radosław Horbik	1–0, 2–0	September 26 - October 2, 2005	2005 World Wrestling Championships	Budapest, Hungary
Win	30–10	(Malta) Abraham Vasallo	4–0, 3–0	September 26 - October 2, 2005	2005 World Wrestling Championships	Budapest, Hungary
2004 Olympics 4th at 84kg
Loss	29–10	(Russia) Sazhid Sazhidov	3–5	August 27–28, 2004	2004 Summer Olympics	Athens, Greece
Loss	29–9	(United States) Cael Sanderson	2–3	August 27–28, 2004	2004 Summer Olympics	Athens, Greece
Win	29–8	(Greece) Lazaros Loizidis	3–1	August 27–28, 2004	2004 Summer Olympics	Athens, Greece
Win	28–8	(Germany) Davyd Bichinashvili	3–0	August 27–28, 2004	2004 Summer Olympics	Athens, Greece
Win	27–8	(Guam) Jeffrey Cobb	Tech. Fall	August 27–28, 2004	2004 Summer Olympics	Athens, Greece
2003 World Championships 6th at 84kg
Loss	26–8	(Russia) Sazhid Sazhidov	0–3	September 12–14, 2003	2003 World Wrestling Championships	(United States) New York, New York
Loss	26–7	(North Macedonia) Mogamed Ibragimov	0–3	September 12–14, 2003	2003 World Wrestling Championships	(United States) New York, New York
Win	26–6	(Switzerland) Thomas Bucheli	9–0	September 12–14, 2003	2003 World Wrestling Championships	(United States) New York, New York
Win	25–6	(Poland) Marcin Jurecki	6–5	September 12–14, 2003	2003 World Wrestling Championships	(United States) New York, New York
2002 World Championships (silver) at 84kg
Loss	24–6	(Russia) Adam Saitiev	3–4	September 5–6, 2002	2002 World Wrestling Championships	Tehran, Iran
Win	24–5	(Iran) Majid Khodaei	3–0	September 5–6, 2002	2002 World Wrestling Championships	Tehran, Iran
Win	23–5	(Georgia (country)) Revaz Mindorashvili	3–2	September 5–6, 2002	2002 World Wrestling Championships	Tehran, Iran
Win	22–5	(Japan) Katsutoshi Senba	Fall	September 5–6, 2002	2002 World Wrestling Championships	Tehran, Iran
Win	21–5	(Hungary) Gabor Kapuvari	4–0	September 5–6, 2002	2002 World Wrestling Championships	Tehran, Iran
2001 World Championships (bronze) at 85kg
Win	20–5	(Belarus) Beibulat Musaev	3–0	November 23–25, 2001	2001 World Wrestling Championships	Sofia, Bulgaria
Loss	19–5	(Russia) Khadzhimurad Magomedov	1–3	November 23–25, 2001	2001 World Wrestling Championships	Sofia, Bulgaria
Win	19–4	(Germany) Andre Backhaus	5–0	November 23–25, 2001	2001 World Wrestling Championships	Sofia, Bulgaria
Win	18–4	(Poland) Marcin Jurecki	4–1	November 23–25, 2001	2001 World Wrestling Championships	Sofia, Bulgaria
Win	17–4	(Armenia) Mahmed Aghaev	5–0	November 23–25, 2001	2001 World Wrestling Championships	Sofia, Bulgaria
2000 Olympics (silver) at 85kg
Loss	16–4	(Russia) Adam Saitiev	Fall	September 29 - October 1, 2000	2000 Summer Olympics	Sydney, Australia
Win	16–3	(Iran) Amir Reza Khadem	3–0	September 29 - October 1, 2000	2000 Summer Olympics	Sydney, Australia
Win	15–3	(Canada) Justin Abdou	8–0	September 29 - October 1, 2000	2000 Summer Olympics	Sydney, Australia
Win	14–3	(Latvia) Igors Samušonoks	3–0	September 29 - October 1, 2000	2000 Summer Olympics	Sydney, Australia
Win	13–3	(Kazakhstan) Magomed Kurugliyev	4–0	September 29 - October 1, 2000	2000 Summer Olympics	Sydney, Australia
1999 World Championships (gold) at 85kg
Win	12–3	(Russia) Khadzhimurad Magomedov	4–2	October 8–10, 1999	1999 World Wrestling Championships	Ankara, Turkey
Win	11–3	(Turkey) Ali Oezen	3–2	October 8–10, 1999	1999 World Wrestling Championships	Ankara, Turkey
Win	10–3	(Kazakhstan) Magomed Kurugliyev	3–0	October 8–10, 1999	1999 World Wrestling Championships	Ankara, Turkey
Win	9–3	(Azerbaijan) Vitali Gizoev	7–0	October 8–10, 1999	1999 World Wrestling Championships	Ankara, Turkey
Win	8–3	(Germany) Andre Backhaus	8–4	October 8–10, 1999	1999 World Wrestling Championships	Ankara, Turkey
Win	7–3	(Iran) Abbas Majidi	4–0	October 8–10, 1999	1999 World Wrestling Championships	Ankara, Turkey
1998 World Championships (bronze) at 85kg
Win	6–3	(Russia) Khadzhimurad Magomedov	3–2	September 9–11, 1998	1998 World Wrestling Championships	Tehran, Iran
Win	5–3	(Poland) Michal Stanislawski	5–1	September 9–11, 1998	1998 World Wrestling Championships	Tehran, Iran
Loss	4–3	(Iran) Alireza Heidari	1–2	September 9–11, 1998	1998 World Wrestling Championships	Tehran, Iran
Win	4–2	(Hungary) Gabor Kapuvari	5–0	September 9–11, 1998	1998 World Wrestling Championships	Tehran, Iran
Win	3–2	(Bulgaria) Plamen Paskalev	5–0	September 9–11, 1998	1998 World Wrestling Championships	Tehran, Iran
1997 World Championships 5th at 85kg
Loss	2–2	(Uzbekistan) Soslan Fraev	1–3	August 29–31, 1997	1997 World Wrestling Championships	Krasnojarsk, Russia
Loss	2–1	(Ukraine) Eldar Assanov	1–3	August 29–31, 1997	1997 World Wrestling Championships	Krasnojarsk, Russia
Win	2–0	(Latvia) Igors Samušonoks	3–1	August 29–31, 1997	1997 World Wrestling Championships	Krasnojarsk, Russia
Win	1–0	(North Macedonia) Gari Modosyan	4–0	August 29–31, 1997	1997 World Wrestling Championships	Krasnojarsk, Russia

== Submission grappling record ==
1 Matches, 1 Wins, 0 Losses, 0 Draws
Result	Rec.	Opponent	Method	Event	Date	Division	Location
Win	1-0	(United States) Chris Barnett	Submission (Kimura)	Dean Toole Promotions	June 15, 2019	Openweight	(United States) Pensacola, Florida

== Dirty boxing record ==
Professional record breakdown
2 matches	2 wins	0 losses
By knockout	2	0
By decision	0	0

Res.	Record	Opponent	Method	Event	Date	Round	Time	Location	Notes
Win	2–0	Ras Hylton	TKO (punches)	Dirty Boxing: DBX1	March 22, 2025	3	2:26	Miami, Florida, United States	
Win	1–0	Duane Crespo	KO (punches)	Dirty Boxing: Premier Event	November 23, 2024	1	N/A	Miami, Florida, United States	

== Bare knuckle record ==
Professional record breakdown
3 matches	1 win	2 losses
By knockout	1	0
By decision	0	2

Res.	Record	Opponent	Method	Event	Date	Round	Time	Location	Notes
Loss	1-2	Darren Till	Decision (unanimous)	BKFC 94	September 26, 2026	5	2:00	Manchester, England	
Loss	1–1	Vagab Vagabov	Decision (unanimous)	IBA Bare Knuckle 4	March 28, 2026	5	2:00	Saint Petersburg, Russia	
Win	1–0	Theo Doukaus	TKO	BKFC 80	September 12, 2025	2	1:56	Hollywood, Florida, United States	

== See also ==
- List of male mixed martial artists

Achievements
Vacant Title last held by Bo Nickal	1st RAF Interim Light Heavyweight Champion; December 20, 2025 – January 10, 2026; Stripped	Vacant Title next held by Kyle Snyder
