= 1999 World Wrestling Championships – Men's freestyle 97 kg =

Men's freestyle 97 kg at the 1999 World Championships
- Venue: Atatürk Sport Hall
- Dates: 7–9 October 1999
- Competitors: 32 from 32 nations

Medalists
gold medal	Sagid Murtazaliev	Russia
silver medal	Alireza Heidari	Iran
bronze medal	Marek Garmulewicz	Poland

The men's freestyle 97 kilograms is a competition featured at the 1999 World Wrestling Championships, and was held at the Atatürk Sport Hall in Ankara, Turkey from 7 to 9 October 1999.

== Results ==
Legend

- R — Retired

=== Preliminary round ===
==== Pool 1 ====
Pos	Athlete	Pld	W	L	CP	TP	ROM	CHN	FRA
1	Adrian Stanciu (ROM)	2	2	0	7	9	—	5–3 Fall	4–3
2	Han Tinghai (CHN)	2	1	1	3	6	0–4 TO	—	3–1
3	William Rombouts (FRA)	2	0	2	2	4	1–3 PP	1–3 PP	—

Source: Official website

==== Pool 2 ====
Pos	Athlete	Pld	W	L	CP	TP	AZE	ESP	GBR
1	Davud Magomedov (AZE)	2	2	0	8	22	—	11–0 Fall	11–0 Fall
2	Nicolás Castro (ESP)	2	1	1	3	8	0–4 TO	—	8–4
3	Douglas Thomson (GBR)	2	0	2	1	4	0–4 TO	1–3 PP	—

Source: Official website

==== Pool 3 ====
Pos	Athlete	Pld	W	L	CP	TP	UKR	GRE	LTU
1	Vadim Tasoyev (UKR)	2	2	0	6	19	—	15–10	4–0
2	Aftantil Xanthopoulos (GRE)	2	1	1	4	13	1–3 PP	—	3–0
3	Ričardas Pauliukonis (LTU)	2	0	2	0	0	0–3 PO	0–3 PO	—

Source: Official website

==== Pool 4 ====
Pos	Athlete	Pld	W	L	CP	TP	IRI	KOR	CZE
1	Alireza Heidari (IRI)	2	2	0	7	17	—	7–0	10–0
2	Kim Kil-soo (KOR)	2	1	1	3	3	0–3 PO	—	3–2
3	Dan Karabin (CZE)	2	0	2	1	2	0–4 ST	1–3 PP	—

Source: Official website

==== Pool 5 ====
Pos	Athlete	Pld	W	L	CP	TP	HUN	SVK	MKD
1	Zoltán Farkas (HUN)	2	2	0	6	11	—	3–2	8–1
2	Milan Mazáč (SVK)	2	1	1	5	10	1–3 PP	—	8–2 Fall
3	Gari Modosyan (MKD)	2	0	2	1	3	1–3 PP	0–4 TO	—

Source: Official website

==== Pool 6 ====
Pos	Athlete	Pld	W	L	CP	TP	POL	LAT	CAN
1	Marek Garmulewicz (POL)	2	2	0	7	10	—	7–1	3–0 Fall
2	Jurijs Janovičs (LAT)	2	1	1	5	11	1–3 PP	—	10–0
3	Dean Schmeichel (CAN)	2	0	2	0	0	0–4 TO	0–4 ST	—

Source: Official website

==== Pool 7 ====
Pos	Athlete	Pld	W	L	CP	TP	GEO	RUS	SUI
1	Eldar Kurtanidze (GEO)	2	2	0	6	5	—	2–0	3–2
2	Sagid Murtazaliev (RUS)	2	1	1	4	21	0–3 PO	—	21–0 Fall
3	Rolf Scherrer (SUI)	2	0	2	1	2	1–3 PP	0–4 TO	—

Source: Official website

==== Pool 8 ====
Pos	Athlete	Pld	W	L	CP	TP	GER	JPN	NED
1	Heiko Balz (GER)	2	2	0	8	8	—	3–2 Fall	5–0 Fall
2	Hiroshi Kosuge (JPN)	2	1	1	3	7	0–4 TO	—	5–1
3	Dries van Leeuwen (NED)	2	0	2	1	1	0–4 TO	1–3 PP	—

Source: Official website

==== Pool 9 ====
Pos	Athlete	Pld	W	L	CP	TP	TUR	CUB	USA	CMR
1	Kaşif Şakiroğlu (TUR)	3	2	1	8	28	—	3–2	2–4	23–0 Fall
2	Wilfredo Morales (CUB)	3	2	1	8	14	1–3 PP	—	2–0	10–0
3	Dominic Black (USA)	3	2	1	7	14	3–1 PP	0–3 PO	—	10–0
4	Isaac Mpia (CMR)	3	0	3	0	0	0–4 TO	0–4 ST	0–4 ST	—

Source: Official website

==== Pool 10 ====
Pos	Athlete	Pld	W	L	CP	TP	MGL	UZB	BUL	ALB
1	Bayanmönkhiin Gantogtokh (MGL)	3	2	1	8	22	—	1–0	2–2	19–0 Fall
2	Soslan Fraev (UZB)	3	2	1	7	9	0–3 PO	—	9–0	WO
3	Martin Lazarov (BUL)	3	2	1	7	2	3–1 PP	0–3 PO	—	WO
4	Ndue Njebza (ALB)	3	0	3	0	0	0–4 TO	0–4 PA	0–4 PA	—

Source: Official website

=== Knockout round ===
Round of 16
Adrian Stanciu (ROM)	3^{R}
Davud Magomedov (AZE)	8
Vadim Tasoyev (UKR)	0
Alireza Heidari (IRI)	2
Zoltán Farkas (HUN)	1
Marek Garmulewicz (POL)	4
Eldar Kurtanidze (GEO)	3
Heiko Balz (GER)	2
Kaşif Şakiroğlu (TUR)	4
Bayanmönkhiin Gantogtokh (MGL)	3
Aftantil Xanthopoulos (GRE)	10
Milan Mazáč (SVK)	0
Jurijs Janovičs (LAT)	0
Sagid Murtazaliev (RUS)	3
Wilfredo Morales (CUB)	5
Soslan Fraev (UZB)	2

Quarterfinals
Davud Magomedov (AZE)	0
Alireza Heidari (IRI)	5
Marek Garmulewicz (POL)	3
Eldar Kurtanidze (GEO)	1
Kaşif Şakiroğlu (TUR)	2
Aftantil Xanthopoulos (GRE)	4
Sagid Murtazaliev (RUS)	7
Wilfredo Morales (CUB)	0

Semifinals
Alireza Heidari (IRI)	3
Marek Garmulewicz (POL)	0
Aftantil Xanthopoulos (GRE)	0
Sagid Murtazaliev (RUS)	12

Final
Alireza Heidari (IRI)	3
Sagid Murtazaliev (RUS)	4
Bronze medal match
Marek Garmulewicz (POL)	2
Aftantil Xanthopoulos (GRE)	2^{R}
