= 1998 World Wrestling Championships – Men's freestyle 97 kg =

Men's freestyle 97 kg at the 1998 World Championships
- Venue: Azadi Indoor Stadium
- Dates: 8–10 September 1998
- Competitors: 26 from 26 nations

Medalists
gold medal	Abbas Jadidi	Iran
silver medal	Marek Garmulewicz	Poland
bronze medal	Kuramagomed Kuramagomedov	Russia

The men's freestyle 97 kilograms is a competition featured at the 1998 World Wrestling Championships, and was held at the Azadi Indoor Stadium in Tehran, Iran from 8 to 10 September 1998.

== Results ==
=== Round 1 ===
	Score	
Round of 32
Zoltán Farkas (HUN)	1–5	Islam Bayramukov (KAZ)
Aftantil Xanthopoulos (GRE)	5–0	Hiroshi Kosuge (JPN)
Rolf Scherrer (SUI)	9–0	Dan Karabin (CZE)
Melvin Douglas (USA)	3–0	Heiko Balz (GER)
Soslan Fraev (UZB)	9–0	Viktor Serbin (BLR)
Jurijs Janovičs (LAT)	1–3	Krasimir Kochev (BUL)
Fanie Vermaak (RSA)	1–10	Gregory Edgelow (CAN)
Abbas Jadidi (IRI)	10–0	Jagdish Kaliraman (IND)
Kaşif Şakiroğlu (TUR)	2–1	Kim Kil-soo (KOR)
Kuramagomed Kuramagomedov (RUS)	3–0	Dolgorsürengiin Sumiyaabazar (MGL)
Arnulfo Hernández (COL)	0–10	Vadim Tasoyev (UKR)
Eldar Kurtanidze (GEO)	1–0	Davud Magomedov (AZE)
Marek Garmulewicz (POL)	10–0	Ba Tumengke (CHN)

=== Round 2 ===
	Score	
Round of 16
Islam Bayramukov (KAZ)	4–3	Aftantil Xanthopoulos (GRE)
Rolf Scherrer (SUI)	1–7	Melvin Douglas (USA)
Soslan Fraev (UZB)	0–2	Krasimir Kochev (BUL)
Gregory Edgelow (CAN)	0–10	Abbas Jadidi (IRI)
Kaşif Şakiroğlu (TUR)	0–8 Fall	Kuramagomed Kuramagomedov (RUS)
Vadim Tasoyev (UKR)	0–1	Eldar Kurtanidze (GEO)
Marek Garmulewicz (POL)		Bye
Repechage
Zoltán Farkas (HUN)	7–3 Fall	Hiroshi Kosuge (JPN)
Heiko Balz (GER)	3–0 Fall	Viktor Serbin (BLR)
Jurijs Janovičs (LAT)	14–2	Fanie Vermaak (RSA)
Jagdish Kaliraman (IND)	0–10	Kim Kil-soo (KOR)
Dolgorsürengiin Sumiyaabazar (MGL)	7–0	Arnulfo Hernández (COL)
Davud Magomedov (AZE)	5–0	Ba Tumengke (CHN)

=== Round 3 ===
	Score	
Quarterfinals
Marek Garmulewicz (POL)	6–1	Islam Bayramukov (KAZ)
Melvin Douglas (USA)	2–0	Krasimir Kochev (BUL)
Abbas Jadidi (IRI)	3–0	Kuramagomed Kuramagomedov (RUS)
Eldar Kurtanidze (GEO)		Bye
Repechage
Zoltán Farkas (HUN)	1–6	Heiko Balz (GER)
Jurijs Janovičs (LAT)	3–7	Kim Kil-soo (KOR)
Dolgorsürengiin Sumiyaabazar (MGL)	1–0	Davud Magomedov (AZE)
Aftantil Xanthopoulos (GRE)	3–2	Rolf Scherrer (SUI)
Soslan Fraev (UZB)	3–0	Gregory Edgelow (CAN)
Kaşif Şakiroğlu (TUR)	0–7	Vadim Tasoyev (UKR)

=== Round 4 ===
	Score	
Repechage
Heiko Balz (GER)	4–0 Fall	Kim Kil-soo (KOR)
Dolgorsürengiin Sumiyaabazar (MGL)	3–0	Aftantil Xanthopoulos (GRE)
Soslan Fraev (UZB)	0–2	Vadim Tasoyev (UKR)
Islam Bayramukov (KAZ)	3–1	Krasimir Kochev (BUL)
Kuramagomed Kuramagomedov (RUS)		Bye

=== Round 5 ===
	Score	
Semifinals
Eldar Kurtanidze (GEO)	1–4	Marek Garmulewicz (POL)
Melvin Douglas (USA)	0–3	Abbas Jadidi (IRI)
Repechage
Kuramagomed Kuramagomedov (RUS)	6–0	Heiko Balz (GER)
Dolgorsürengiin Sumiyaabazar (MGL)	0–4	Vadim Tasoyev (UKR)
Islam Bayramukov (KAZ)		Bye

=== Round 6 ===
	Score	
Repechage
Islam Bayramukov (KAZ)	0–3	Kuramagomed Kuramagomedov (RUS)
Vadim Tasoyev (UKR)		Bye

=== Round 7 ===
	Score	
Repechage
Eldar Kurtanidze (GEO)	1–3	Kuramagomed Kuramagomedov (RUS)
Vadim Tasoyev (UKR)	3–0	Melvin Douglas (USA)

=== Finals ===
	Score	
Bronze medal match
Kuramagomed Kuramagomedov (RUS)	3–0	Vadim Tasoyev (UKR)
Final
Marek Garmulewicz (POL)	0–0	Abbas Jadidi (IRI)
