= 2001 World Wrestling Championships – Men's freestyle 97 kg =

Wrestling competition

Men's freestyle 97 kg at the 2001 World Championships
- Venue: Winter Sports Palace
- Dates: 22–24 November 2001
- Competitors: 23 from 23 nations

Medalists
gold medal	Giorgi Gogshelidze	Russia
silver medal	Krasimir Kochev	Bulgaria
bronze medal	Vadim Tasoyev	Ukraine

The men's freestyle 97 kilograms is a competition featured at the 2001 World Wrestling Championships, and was held at the Winter Sports Palace in Sofia, Bulgaria from 22 to 24 November 2001.

== Results ==
=== Preliminary round ===
==== Pool 1 ====
Pos	Athlete	Pld	W	L	CP	TP	GEO	BLR	EST
1	Eldar Kurtanidze (GEO)	2	2	0	7	13	—	3–0	10–0
2	Aleksandr Shemarov (BLR)	2	1	1	4	10	0–3 PO	—	10–0
3	Neeme Jaanson (EST)	2	0	2	0	0	0–4 ST	0–4 ST	—

Source: Official website

==== Pool 2 ====
Pos	Athlete	Pld	W	L	CP	TP	UKR	USA	MGL
1	Vadim Tasoyev (UKR)	2	2	0	7	16	—	6–2	10–0
2	Dominic Black (USA)	2	1	1	4	13	1–3 PP	—	11–7
3	Ganzorigiin Gankhuyag (MGL)	2	0	2	1	7	0–4 ST	1–3 PP	—

Source: Official website

==== Pool 3 ====
Pos	Athlete	Pld	W	L	CP	TP	TUR	JPN	LAT
1	Taşkın Özkale (TUR)	2	1	1	5	11	—	1–3	10–0
2	Kiyotaka Kodaira (JPN)	2	1	1	4	6	3–1 PP	—	3–4
3	Jurijs Janovičs (LAT)	2	1	1	3	4	0–4 ST	3–1 PP	—

Source: Official website

==== Pool 4 ====
Pos	Athlete	Pld	W	L	CP	TP	RUS	IRI	SUI
1	Giorgi Gogshelidze (RUS)	2	2	0	7	11	—	4–1 Fall	7–0
2	Alireza Heidari (IRI)	2	1	1	3	7	0–4 TO	—	6–1
3	Rolf Scherrer (SUI)	2	0	2	1	1	0–3 PO	1–3 PP	—

Source: Official website

==== Pool 5 ====
Pos	Athlete	Pld	W	L	CP	TP	NED	GER	IND
1	George Torchinava (NED)	2	2	0	6	7	—	3–2	4–3
2	Mesut Okcu (GER)	2	1	1	4	9	1–3 PP	—	7–1
3	Shamsher Singh (IND)	2	0	2	2	4	1–3 PP	1–3 PP	—

Source: Official website

==== Pool 6 ====
Pos	Athlete	Pld	W	L	CP	TP	HUN	UZB	CUB	POL
1	Zoltán Farkas (HUN)	3	2	1	8	15	—	3–2	2–3	10–0 Fall
2	Magomed Ibragimov (UZB)	3	2	1	7	16	1–3 PP	—	5–2	9–1
3	Wilfredo Morales (CUB)	3	2	1	7	8	3–1 PP	1–3 PP	—	3–0
4	Maksymilian Witek (POL)	3	0	3	1	1	0–4 TO	1–3 PP	0–3 PO	—

Source: Official website

==== Pool 7 ====
Pos	Athlete	Pld	W	L	CP	TP	BUL	GBR	KOR	MKD
1	Krasimir Kochev (BUL)	3	3	0	10	24	—	10–0	4–1	10–5
2	Johannes Rossouw (GBR)	3	2	1	8	4	0–4 ST	—	4–0 Fall	WO
3	Kang Dong-kuk (KOR)	3	1	2	5	6	1–3 PP	0–4 TO	—	5–0 Ret
4	Žarko Kocev (MKD)	3	0	3	1	5	1–3 PP	0–4 PA	0–4 PA	—

Source: Official website

=== Knockout round ===
Quarterfinals
Eldar Kurtanidze (GEO)	1
Vadim Tasoyev (UKR)	4
Taşkın Özkale (TUR)	0
Giorgi Gogshelidze (RUS)	3
George Torchinava (NED)	1
Zoltán Farkas (HUN)	3

Semifinals
Vadim Tasoyev (UKR)	0
Giorgi Gogshelidze (RUS)	4
Zoltán Farkas (HUN)	0
Krasimir Kochev (BUL)	7

Final
Giorgi Gogshelidze (RUS)	3
Krasimir Kochev (BUL)	0
Bronze medal match
Vadim Tasoyev (UKR)	10
Zoltán Farkas (HUN)	0
