= 2001 World Wrestling Championships – Men's freestyle 85 kg =

Men's freestyle 85 kg at the 2001 World Championships
- Venue: Winter Sports Palace
- Dates: 23–25 November 2001
- Competitors: 24 from 24 nations

Medalists
| gold medal | Khadzhimurad Magomedov | Russia |
| silver medal | Brandon Eggum | United States |
| bronze medal | Yoel Romero | Cuba |

The men's freestyle 85 kilograms is a competition featured at the 2001 World Wrestling Championships, and was held at the Winter Sports Palace in Sofia, Bulgaria from 23 to 25 November 2001.

== Results ==
=== Preliminary round ===
==== Pool 1 ====
| Pos | Athlete | Pld | W | L | CP | TP | GER | MGL | LTU |
|---|---|---|---|---|---|---|---|---|---|
| 1 | André Backhaus (GER) | 2 | 2 | 0 | 6 | 20 | — | 10–8 | 10–3 |
| 2 | Narantsetsegiin Bürenbaatar (MGL) | 2 | 1 | 1 | 4 | 17 | 1–3 PP | — | 9–2 |
| 3 | Egidijus Vielavičius (LTU) | 2 | 0 | 2 | 2 | 5 | 1–3 PP | 1–3 PP | — |

Source: Official website

==== Pool 2 ====
| Pos | Athlete | Pld | W | L | CP | TP | CUB | POL | ARM |
|---|---|---|---|---|---|---|---|---|---|
| 1 | Yoel Romero (CUB) | 2 | 2 | 0 | 6 | 9 | — | 4–1 | 5–0 |
| 2 | Marcin Jurecki (POL) | 2 | 1 | 1 | 5 | 1 | 1–3 PP | — | WO |
| 3 | Mamed Aghaev (ARM) | 2 | 0 | 2 | 0 | 0 | 0–3 PO | 0–4 PA | — |

Source: Official website

==== Pool 3 ====
| Pos | Athlete | Pld | W | L | CP | TP | RUS | KOR | UKR |
|---|---|---|---|---|---|---|---|---|---|
| 1 | Khadzhimurad Magomedov (RUS) | 2 | 2 | 0 | 8 | 8 | — | 7–0 Fall | 1–0 Ret |
| 2 | Song Se-min (KOR) | 2 | 1 | 1 | 4 | 0 | 0–4 TO | — | WO |
| 3 | Davyd Bichinashvili (UKR) | 2 | 0 | 2 | 0 | 0 | 0–4 PA | 0–4 PA | — |

Source: Official website

==== Pool 4 ====
| Pos | Athlete | Pld | W | L | CP | TP | BUL | LAT | TKM |
|---|---|---|---|---|---|---|---|---|---|
| 1 | Arkadiy Tzopa (BUL) | 2 | 2 | 0 | 7 | 13 | — | 3–0 | 10–0 |
| 2 | Igors Samušonoks (LAT) | 2 | 1 | 1 | 4 | 3 | 0–3 PO | — | 3–2 Fall |
| 3 | Oleg Kadyrow (TKM) | 2 | 0 | 2 | 0 | 2 | 0–4 ST | 0–4 TO | — |

Source: Official website

==== Pool 5 ====
| Pos | Athlete | Pld | W | L | CP | TP | USA | GRE | IND |
|---|---|---|---|---|---|---|---|---|---|
| 1 | Brandon Eggum (USA) | 2 | 2 | 0 | 7 | 14 | — | 3–2 | 11–0 |
| 2 | Lazaros Loizidis (GRE) | 2 | 1 | 1 | 5 | 15 | 1–3 PP | — | 13–3 |
| 3 | Amandeep Sondhi (IND) | 2 | 0 | 2 | 1 | 3 | 0–4 ST | 1–4 SP | — |

Source: Official website

==== Pool 6 ====
| Pos | Athlete | Pld | W | L | CP | TP | KAZ | TUR | SUI |
|---|---|---|---|---|---|---|---|---|---|
| 1 | Magomed Kurugliyev (KAZ) | 2 | 2 | 0 | 6 | 14 | — | 5–2 | 9–1 |
| 2 | Ali Özen (TUR) | 2 | 1 | 1 | 4 | 9 | 1–3 PP | — | 7–1 |
| 3 | Thomas Bucheli (SUI) | 2 | 0 | 2 | 2 | 2 | 1–3 PP | 1–3 PP | — |

Source: Official website

==== Pool 7 ====
| Pos | Athlete | Pld | W | L | CP | TP | UZB | GEO | HUN |
|---|---|---|---|---|---|---|---|---|---|
| 1 | Rasul Katinovasov (UZB) | 2 | 2 | 0 | 7 | 15 | — | 10–2 Fall | 5–4 |
| 2 | Malkhaz Jorbenadze (GEO) | 2 | 1 | 1 | 3 | 9 | 0–4 TO | — | 7–5 |
| 3 | Tamás Kiss (HUN) | 2 | 0 | 2 | 2 | 9 | 1–3 PP | 1–3 PP | — |

Source: Official website

==== Pool 8 ====
| Pos | Athlete | Pld | W | L | CP | TP | BLR | IRI | JPN |
|---|---|---|---|---|---|---|---|---|---|
| 1 | Beibulat Musaev (BLR) | 2 | 1 | 1 | 4 | 8 | — | 4–3 | 4–5 |
| 2 | Majid Khodaei (IRI) | 2 | 1 | 1 | 4 | 6 | 1–3 PP | — | 3–1 |
| 3 | Tatsuo Kawai (JPN) | 2 | 1 | 1 | 4 | 6 | 3–1 PP | 1–3 PP | — |

Source: Official website

=== Knockout round ===
Quarterfinals
André Backhaus (GER) | 0
Yoel Romero (CUB) | 5
Khadzhimurad Magomedov (RUS) | 5
Arkadiy Tzopa (BUL) | 0
Brandon Eggum (USA) | 3
Magomed Kurugliyev (KAZ) | 0
Rasul Katinovasov (UZB) | 2
Beibulat Musaev (BLR) | 3

Semifinals
Yoel Romero (CUB) | 1
Khadzhimurad Magomedov (RUS) | 3
Brandon Eggum (USA) | 3
Beibulat Musaev (BLR) | 2

Final
Khadzhimurad Magomedov (RUS) | 3
Brandon Eggum (USA) | 0
Bronze medal match
Yoel Romero (CUB) | 3
Beibulat Musaev (BLR) | 0
