= 2002 World Wrestling Championships – Men's freestyle 96 kg =

Men's freestyle 96 kg at the 2002 World Championships
- Venue: Azadi Indoor Stadium
- Dates: 6–7 September 2002
- Competitors: 23 from 23 nations

Medalists
gold medal	Eldar Kurtanidze	Georgia
silver medal	Alireza Heidari	Iran
bronze medal	Vadim Tasoyev	Ukraine

The men's freestyle 96 kilograms competition was featured at the 2002 World Wrestling Championships, and was held at the Azadi Indoor Stadium in Tehran, Iran from 6 to 7 September 2002.

== Results ==
=== Preliminary round ===
==== Pool 1 ====
Pos	Athlete	Pld	W	L	CP	TP	GRE	HUN	BRA
1	Aftantil Xanthopoulos (GRE)	2	2	0	7	17	—	7–2	10–0
2	Zoltán Farkas (HUN)	2	1	1	5	14	1–3 PP	—	12–2
3	Antoine Jaoude (BRA)	2	0	2	1	2	0–4 ST	1–4 SP	—

Source: Official website

==== Pool 2 ====
Pos	Athlete	Pld	W	L	CP	TP	CUB	UZB	IND
1	Wilfredo Morales (CUB)	2	2	0	6	9	—	4–0	5–2
2	Magomed Ibragimov (UZB)	2	1	1	3	4	0–3 PO	—	4–1
3	Rakesh Patel (IND)	2	0	2	2	3	1–3 PP	1–3 PP	—

Source: Official website

==== Pool 3 ====
Pos	Athlete	Pld	W	L	CP	TP	GEO	TUR	POL
1	Eldar Kurtanidze (GEO)	2	2	0	6	11	—	4–0	7–0
2	Fatih Çakıroğlu (TUR)	2	1	1	3	5	0–3 PO	—	5–3
3	Bartłomiej Bartnicki (POL)	2	0	2	1	3	0–3 PO	1–3 PP	—

Source: Official website

==== Pool 4 ====
Pos	Athlete	Pld	W	L	CP	TP	RUS	KOR	BUL
1	Giorgi Gogshelidze (RUS)	2	2	0	6	7	—	5–1	2–1
2	Koo Hak-ja (KOR)	2	1	1	4	4	1–3 PP	—	3–2
3	Krasimir Kochev (BUL)	2	0	2	2	3	1–3 PP	1–3 PP	—

Source: Official website

==== Pool 5 ====
Pos	Athlete	Pld	W	L	CP	TP	UKR	MGL	JPN
1	Vadim Tasoyev (UKR)	2	2	0	8	11	—	10–0	11–0
2	Tüvshintöriin Enkhtuyaa (MGL)	2	1	1	3	4	0–4 ST	—	4–1
3	Yoshihiro Nakao (JPN)	2	0	2	1	1	0–4 ST	1–3 PP	—

Source: Official website

==== Pool 6 ====
Pos	Athlete	Pld	W	L	CP	TP	BLR	CAN	KAZ	ARM
1	Aleksandr Shemarov (BLR)	3	3	0	10	16	—	2–1	4–0	10–0
2	Dean Schmeichel (CAN)	3	2	1	7	9	1–3 PP	—	3–0	5–1
3	Yessaly Abdullayev (KAZ)	3	1	2	4	6	0–3 PO	0–3 PO	—	6–6 Fall
4	Arsen Sarkhoshyan (ARM)	3	0	3	1	7	0–4 ST	1–3 PP	0–4 TO	—

Source: Official website

==== Pool 7 ====
Pos	Athlete	Pld	W	L	CP	TP	IRI	SUI	CHN	IRQ
1	Alireza Heidari (IRI)	3	3	0	11	25	—	3–0	11–0	11–0
2	Rolf Scherrer (SUI)	3	2	1	8	21	0–3 PO	—	13–3 Fall	8–0 Fall
3	Chen Dakuan (CHN)	3	1	2	4	3	0–4 ST	0–4 TO	—	WO
4	Sofian Abdul-Lateef (IRQ)	3	0	3	0	0	0–4 ST	0–4 TO	0–4 PA	—

Source: Official website

=== Knockout round ===
Quarterfinals
Aftantil Xanthopoulos (GRE)	3
Wilfredo Morales (CUB)	0
Eldar Kurtanidze (GEO)	3
Giorgi Gogshelidze (RUS)	1
Vadim Tasoyev (UKR)	3
Aleksandr Shemarov (BLR)	1

Semifinals
Aftantil Xanthopoulos (GRE)	0
Eldar Kurtanidze (GEO)	6
Vadim Tasoyev (UKR)	0
Alireza Heidari (IRI)	3

Final
Eldar Kurtanidze (GEO)	2
Alireza Heidari (IRI)	1
Bronze medal match
Aftantil Xanthopoulos (GRE)	0
Vadim Tasoyev (UKR)	10
