= Wrestling at the 2000 Summer Olympics – Men's freestyle 97 kg =

Men's freestyle 97 kg at the Games of the XXVII Olympiad
- Venue: Sydney Convention and Exhibition Centre
- Date: 28–30 September 2000
- Competitors: 19 from 19 nations

Medalists
1st place, gold medalist(s)		Sagid Murtazaliev	Russia
2nd place, silver medalist(s)		Islam Bayramukov	Kazakhstan
3rd place, bronze medalist(s)		Eldar Kurtanidze	Georgia

The men's freestyle 97 kilograms at the 2000 Summer Olympics as part of the wrestling program was held at the Sydney Convention and Exhibition Centre from September 28 to 30. The competition held with an elimination system of three or four wrestlers in each pool, with the winners qualify for the quarterfinals, semifinals and final by way of direct elimination.

== Schedule ==
All times are Australian Eastern Daylight Time (UTC+11:00)

Date	Time	Event
28 September 2000	09:30	Round 1
28 September 2000	17:00	Round 2
28 September 2000	17:00	Round 3
29 September 2000	09:30	Quarterfinals
29 September 2000	17:00	Semifinals
30 September 2000	17:00	Finals

== Results ==
Legend

- WO — Won by walkover

=== Elimination pools ===
==== Pool 1 ====
Pos	Athlete	Pld	W	L	CP	TP	Qualification
1	Eldar Kurtanidze (GEO)	2	2	0	7	14	Knockout round
2	Arawat Sabejew (GER)	2	1	1	4	6	
3	Ričardas Pauliukonis (LTU)	2	0	2	2	2	

Source: Official Report

	Score		CP
Ričardas Pauliukonis (LTU)	1–11	Eldar Kurtanidze (GEO)	1–4 SP
Arawat Sabejew (GER)	5–1	Ričardas Pauliukonis (LTU)	3–1 PP
Eldar Kurtanidze (GEO)	3–1	Arawat Sabejew (GER)	3–1 PP

==== Pool 2 ====
Pos	Athlete	Pld	W	L	CP	TP	Qualification
1	Alireza Heidari (IRI)	2	2	0	6	13	Knockout round
2	Rolf Scherrer (SUI)	2	1	1	4	5	
3	Ahmet Doğu (TUR)	2	0	2	2	4	

Source: Official Report

	Score		CP
Alireza Heidari (IRI)	7–1	Rolf Scherrer (SUI)	3–1 PP
Ahmet Doğu (TUR)	1–6	Alireza Heidari (IRI)	1–3 PP
Rolf Scherrer (SUI)	4–3	Ahmet Doğu (TUR)	3–1 PP

==== Pool 3 ====
Pos	Athlete	Pld	W	L	CP	TP	Qualification
1	Sagid Murtazaliev (RUS)	2	2	0	6	7	Knockout round
2	Vadim Tasoyev (UKR)	2	1	1	3	5	
3	Melvin Douglas (USA)	2	0	2	2	2	

Source: Official Report

	Score		CP
Sagid Murtazaliev (RUS)	4–0	Vadim Tasoyev (UKR)	3–0 PO
Melvin Douglas (USA)	1–3	Sagid Murtazaliev (RUS)	1–3 PP
Vadim Tasoyev (UKR)	5–1	Melvin Douglas (USA)	3–1 PP

==== Pool 4 ====
Pos	Athlete	Pld	W	L	CP	TP	Qualification
1	Aftantil Xanthopoulos (GRE)	2	2	0	6	7	Knockout round
2	George Torchinava (NED)	2	1	1	4	14	
3	Victor Kodei (NGR)	2	0	2	2	4	

Source: Official Report

	Score		CP
Aftantil Xanthopoulos (GRE)	4–1	Victor Kodei (NGR)	3–1 PP
George Torchinava (NED)	0–3	Aftantil Xanthopoulos (GRE)	0–3 PO
Victor Kodei (NGR)	3–14	George Torchinava (NED)	1–4 SP

==== Pool 5 ====
Pos	Athlete	Pld	W	L	CP	TP	Qualification
1	Islam Bayramukov (KAZ)	2	1	1	3 (Note: Head-to-head result: KAZ 3–0 AZE.)	3	Knockout round
2	Davud Magomedov (AZE)	2	1	1	3	3	
3	Wilfredo Morales (CUB)	2	1	1	3	2	

Source: Official Report
Notes:

	Score		CP
Davud Magomedov (AZE)	0–3	Islam Bayramukov (KAZ)	0–3 PO
Wilfredo Morales (CUB)	0–3	Davud Magomedov (AZE)	0–3 PO
Islam Bayramukov (KAZ)	0–2	Wilfredo Morales (CUB)	0–3 PO

==== Pool 6 ====
Pos	Athlete	Pld	W	L	CP	TP	Qualification
1	Marek Garmulewicz (POL)	3	3	0	9	9	Knockout round
2	Aleksandr Shemarov (BLR)	3	2	1	7	14	
3	Gabriel Szerda (AUS)	3	1	2	3	4	
4	Dean Schmeichel (CAN)	3	0	3	1	2	

Source: Official Report

	Score		CP
Aleksandr Shemarov (BLR)	7–0	Gabriel Szerda (AUS)	3–0 PO
Dean Schmeichel (CAN)	0–3	Marek Garmulewicz (POL)	0–3 PO
Aleksandr Shemarov (BLR)	5–0	Dean Schmeichel (CAN)	3–0 PO
Gabriel Szerda (AUS)	0–3	Marek Garmulewicz (POL)	0–3 PO
Aleksandr Shemarov (BLR)	2–3	Marek Garmulewicz (POL)	1–3 PP
Gabriel Szerda (AUS)	4–2	Dean Schmeichel (CAN)	3–1 PP

=== Knockout round ===
Quarterfinals
Eldar Kurtanidze (GEO)	1
Alireza Heidari (IRI)	0
Sagid Murtazaliev (RUS)	5
Aftantil Xanthopoulos (GRE)	0

Semifinals
Eldar Kurtanidze (GEO)	1
Sagid Murtazaliev (RUS)	3
Islam Bayramukov (KAZ)	3
Marek Garmulewicz (POL)	0

Gold medal match
Sagid Murtazaliev (RUS)	6
Islam Bayramukov (KAZ)	0
Bronze medal match
Eldar Kurtanidze (GEO)	4
Marek Garmulewicz (POL)	1

Classification 5th–6th
Alireza Heidari (IRI)
Aftantil Xanthopoulos (GRE)	WO

== Final standing ==
Rank	Athlete
1st place, gold medalist(s)	Sagid Murtazaliev (RUS)
2nd place, silver medalist(s)	Islam Bayramukov (KAZ)
3rd place, bronze medalist(s)	Eldar Kurtanidze (GEO)
4	Marek Garmulewicz (POL)
5	Aftantil Xanthopoulos (GRE)
6	Alireza Heidari (IRI)
7	Aleksandr Shemarov (BLR)
8	George Torchinava (NED)
9	Arawat Sabejew (GER)
10	Rolf Scherrer (SUI)
11	Vadim Tasoyev (UKR)
12	Gabriel Szerda (AUS)
13	Davud Magomedov (AZE)
14	Wilfredo Morales (CUB)
15	Victor Kodei (NGR)
16	Ahmet Doğu (TUR)
17	Ričardas Pauliukonis (LTU)
18	Melvin Douglas (USA)
19	Dean Schmeichel (CAN)
