= 2002 World Wrestling Championships – Men's freestyle 84 kg =

2002 wrestling competition

Men's freestyle 84 kg at the 2002 World Championships
- Venue: Azadi Indoor Stadium
- Dates: 5–6 September 2002
- Competitors: 25 from 25 nations

Medalists
gold medal	Adam Saitiev	Russia
silver medal	Yoel Romero	Cuba
bronze medal	Majid Khodaei	Iran

The men's freestyle 84 kilograms event at the 2002 World Wrestling Championships, was held at the Azadi Indoor Stadium in Tehran, Iran from 5 to 6 September 2002.

== Results ==
Legend

- F — Won by fall

=== Preliminary round ===
==== Pool 1 ====
Pos	Athlete	Pld	W	L	CP	TP	IRI	GRE	AZE
1	Majid Khodaei (IRI)	2	2	0	6	12	—	4–3	8–2
2	Lazaros Loizidis (GRE)	2	1	1	4	8	1–3 PP	—	5–1
3	Fuad Garayev (AZE)	2	0	2	2	3	1–3 PP	1–3 PP	—

Source: Official website

==== Pool 2 ====
Pos	Athlete	Pld	W	L	CP	TP	UZB	KAZ	TUN
1	Aslan Sanakoev (UZB)	2	2	0	7	16	—	6–0	10–0
2	Zhumagali Mamutov (KAZ)	2	1	1	4	4	0–3 PO	—	4–0 Fall
3	Mohamed Ali Bouzaiane (TUN)	2	0	2	0	0	0–4 ST	0–4 TO	—

Source: Official website

==== Pool 3 ====
Pos	Athlete	Pld	W	L	CP	TP	GEO	UKR	CAN
1	Revaz Mindorashvili (GEO)	2	2	0	6	9	—	4–1	5–0
2	Eldar Assanov (UKR)	2	1	1	4	4	1–3 PP	—	3–1
3	Nick Ugoalah (CAN)	2	0	2	1	1	0–3 PO	1–3 PP	—

Source: Official website

==== Pool 4 ====
Pos	Athlete	Pld	W	L	CP	TP	CUB	JPN	HUN
1	Yoel Romero (CUB)	2	2	0	7	11	—	7–0 Fall	4–0
2	Katsutoshi Semba (JPN)	2	1	1	4	5	0–4 TO	—	5–7 Fall
3	Gábor Kapuvári (HUN)	2	0	2	0	7	0–3 PO	0–4 TO	—

Source: Official website

==== Pool 5 ====
Pos	Athlete	Pld	W	L	CP	TP	POL	SEN	CHN
1	Marcin Jurecki (POL)	2	2	0	8	15	—	10–0	5–0 Fall
2	Jean Diatta (SEN)	2	1	1	3	7	0–4 ST	—	7–1
3	Su Jiankui (CHN)	2	0	2	1	1	0–4 TO	1–3 PP	—

Source: Official website

==== Pool 6 ====
Pos	Athlete	Pld	W	L	CP	TP	RUS	MGL	IND
1	Adam Saitiev (RUS)	2	2	0	8	21	—	11–0	10–0
2	Narantsetsegiin Bürenbaatar (MGL)	2	1	1	4	2	0–4 ST	—	2–2 Fall
3	Amandeep Sondhi (IND)	2	0	2	0	2	0–4 ST	0–4 TO	—

Source: Official website

==== Pool 7 ====
Pos	Athlete	Pld	W	L	CP	TP	BUL	TUR	BLR
1	Arkadiy Tzopa (BUL)	2	2	0	6	12	—	4–0	8–4
2	Serhat Balcı (TUR)	2	1	1	3	8	0–3 PO	—	8–0
3	Aliaksei Mastsiapanau (BLR)	2	0	2	1	4	1–3 PP	0–3 PO	—

Source: Official website

==== Pool 8 ====
Pos	Athlete	Pld	W	L	CP	TP	GER	KOR	SUI	MKD
1	André Backhaus (GER)	3	3	0	10	19	—	3–1	3–0	13–4 Fall
2	Kim Jang-soo (KOR)	3	2	1	8	7	1–3 PP	—	6–2	WO
3	Robert Eggertswyler (SUI)	3	1	2	5	2	0–3 PO	1–3 PP	—	WO
4	Magomed Ibragimov (MKD)	3	0	3	0	4	0–4 TO	0–4 PA	0–4 PA	—

Source: Official website

=== Knockout round ===
Quarterfinals
Majid Khodaei (IRI)	4
Aslan Sanakoev (UZB)	2
Revaz Mindorashvili (GEO)	2
Yoel Romero (CUB)	3
Marcin Jurecki (POL)	3
Adam Saitiev (RUS)	7
Arkadiy Tzopa (BUL)	3
André Backhaus (GER)	1

Semifinals
Majid Khodaei (IRI)	0
Yoel Romero (CUB)	3
Adam Saitiev (RUS)	3^{F}
Arkadiy Tzopa (BUL)	0

Final
Yoel Romero (CUB)	3
Adam Saitiev (RUS)	4
Bronze medal match
Majid Khodaei (IRI)	7
Arkadiy Tzopa (BUL)	1
