= 2006 World Wrestling Championships – Men's freestyle 96 kg =

Men's freestyle 96 kg at the 2006 World Championships
- Venue: Tianhe Gymnasium
- Dates: 29 September 2006
- Competitors: 27 from 27 nations

Medalists
gold medal	Khadzhimurat Gatsalov	Russia
silver medal	Besik Kudukhov	Georgia
bronze medal	Michel Batista	Cuba
bronze medal	Ruslan Sheikhau	Belarus

The men's freestyle 96 kilograms was a competition featured at the 2006 World Wrestling Championships, held at the Tianhe Gymnasium in Guangzhou, China, on 29 September 2006.

This freestyle wrestling competition consists of a single-elimination tournament, with a repechage used to determine the winner of two bronze medals.

== Results ==
Legend

- F — Won by fall
- WO — Won by walkover

=== Final ===
Final
Khadzhimurat Gatsalov (RUS)	0	3	4
Giorgi Gogshelidze (GEO)	1	0	0

=== Top half ===
Round of 32
Cui Xiaocheng (CHN)	1	4
Luis Vivenes (VEN)	1	1
Michel Batista (CUB)	1	2	1
Shamil Gitinov (ARM)	0	3	0
Gürjavyn Batpürev (MGL)	1	0
Sait Bingöl (TUR)	2	6

Round of 16
Nicolás Castro (ESP)	0	0
David Zilberman (CAN)	5	7
Koo Tae-hyun (KOR)	2	2	1
Kiyotaka Kodaira (JPN)	3	0	0
Khadzhimurat Gatsalov (RUS)	6	3
Cui Xiaocheng (CHN)	0	0
Michel Batista (CUB)	0	5	4
Sait Bingöl (TUR)	1	0	0

Quarterfinals
David Zilberman (CAN)	1	3^{F}
Koo Tae-hyun (KOR)	0	0
Khadzhimurat Gatsalov (RUS)	3	9^{F}
Michel Batista (CUB)	0	4

Semifinals
David Zilberman (CAN)	0	0
Khadzhimurat Gatsalov (RUS)	3	2

=== Bottom half ===
Round of 32
Norbert Bödör (SVK)	0
Giorgi Gogshelidze (GEO)	4^{F}
Alireza Heidari (IRI)	2	0	7
Daniel Cormier (USA)	0	1	0
Antoine Jaoude (BRA)	0	0
Aleksey Krupnyakov (KGZ)	7	4
Kazbek Missikov (FRA)	0	4
Stefan Kehrer (GER)	1	5^{F}
Rohit Patel (IND)	7	7
Waylon Muller (MHL)	0	0
Francesco Miano-Petta (ITA)	0	0
Ruslan Sheikhau (BLR)	3	4
Vasyl Tesmynetskyi (UKR)	1	2	1
Gergely Kiss (HUN)	6	0	0
Bartłomiej Bartnicki (POL)	0	1	0
Nurzhan Katayev (KAZ)	1	0	5

Round of 16
Giorgi Gogshelidze (GEO)	2	0	1
Alireza Heidari (IRI)	0	1	0
Aleksey Krupnyakov (KGZ)	2	3
Stefan Kehrer (GER)	1	0
Rohit Patel (IND)	1	0
Ruslan Sheikhau (BLR)	6	6
Vasyl Tesmynetskyi (UKR)	2	0	3
Nurzhan Katayev (KAZ)	0	2	2

Quarterfinals
Giorgi Gogshelidze (GEO)	1	2
Aleksey Krupnyakov (KGZ)	0	0
Ruslan Sheikhau (BLR)	2	0	1
Vasyl Tesmynetskyi (UKR)	1	1	0

Semifinals
Giorgi Gogshelidze (GEO)	1	3
Ruslan Sheikhau (BLR)	1	0

=== Repechage ===
Repechage round 1
Norbert Bödör (SVK)
Alireza Heidari (IRI)	W	O

Repechage round 2
Cui Xiaocheng (CHN)	1	3
Michel Batista (CUB)	2	3
Alireza Heidari (IRI)	1	2
Aleksey Krupnyakov (KGZ)	1	1

Bronze medals
Michel Batista (CUB)	0	1	1
David Zilberman (CAN)	1	0	1
Alireza Heidari (IRI)	1	0	1
Ruslan Sheikhau (BLR)	0	1	1
