= David Zilberman (wrestler) =

Canadian freestyle wrestler (born 1982)

David Zilberman (born December 6, 1982) is a Canadian Olympic freestyle wrestler. He is a two-time Canadian champion. In 2003, he won a bronze medal at the Pan American Championships, wrestling at 84 kg. In 2004, he won a silver medal at the FISU World University Championships, at 84 kg. In 2005, he won the Canada Cup gold medal, and the Commonwealth Wrestling Championships silver medal. He took 5th in the 2006 World Championships, and won a silver medal at the 2006 FISU World University Championships. He won a gold medal at the 2007 Senior Canadian National Championships.

== Early life ==
He is son of Victor Zilberman. Zilberman is Jewish, and was born in Montreal, Quebec. He started wrestling when he was 14 years old. He attended Vanier College, McGill University and Concordia University. He is a member of the YM-YWHA Montreal Jewish Sports Hall of Fame.

== Wrestling career ==
He wrestles in the Men's Freestyle, at 96 kg. He wrestles for the Montreal Wrestling Club, and is coached by his father Victor Zilberman and Robert Moore. He is a two-time Canadian champion.

In 2003, he won a bronze medal at the Pan American Championships, wrestling at 84 kg. In 2004, he won a silver medal at the FISU World University Championships, at 84 kg. In 2005, he won the Canada Cup gold medal, and the Commonwealth Wrestling Championships silver medal. He took 5th in the 2006 World Championships, and won a silver medal at the 2006 FISU World University Championships. He won a gold medal at the 2007 Senior Canadian National Championships. He won a bronze medal in the 2008 Pan American Championships. He competed at the 2008 Summer Olympics in wrestling as a heavyweight, and came in 14th.

He competed for Canada at the 2009 Maccabiah Games.

He was the coach of a contingent of Jewish Canadian wrestlers who competed at the 2013 Maccabiah Games in Ashdod, Israel.
