= Firdovsi Umudov =

Azerbaijani wrestling coach

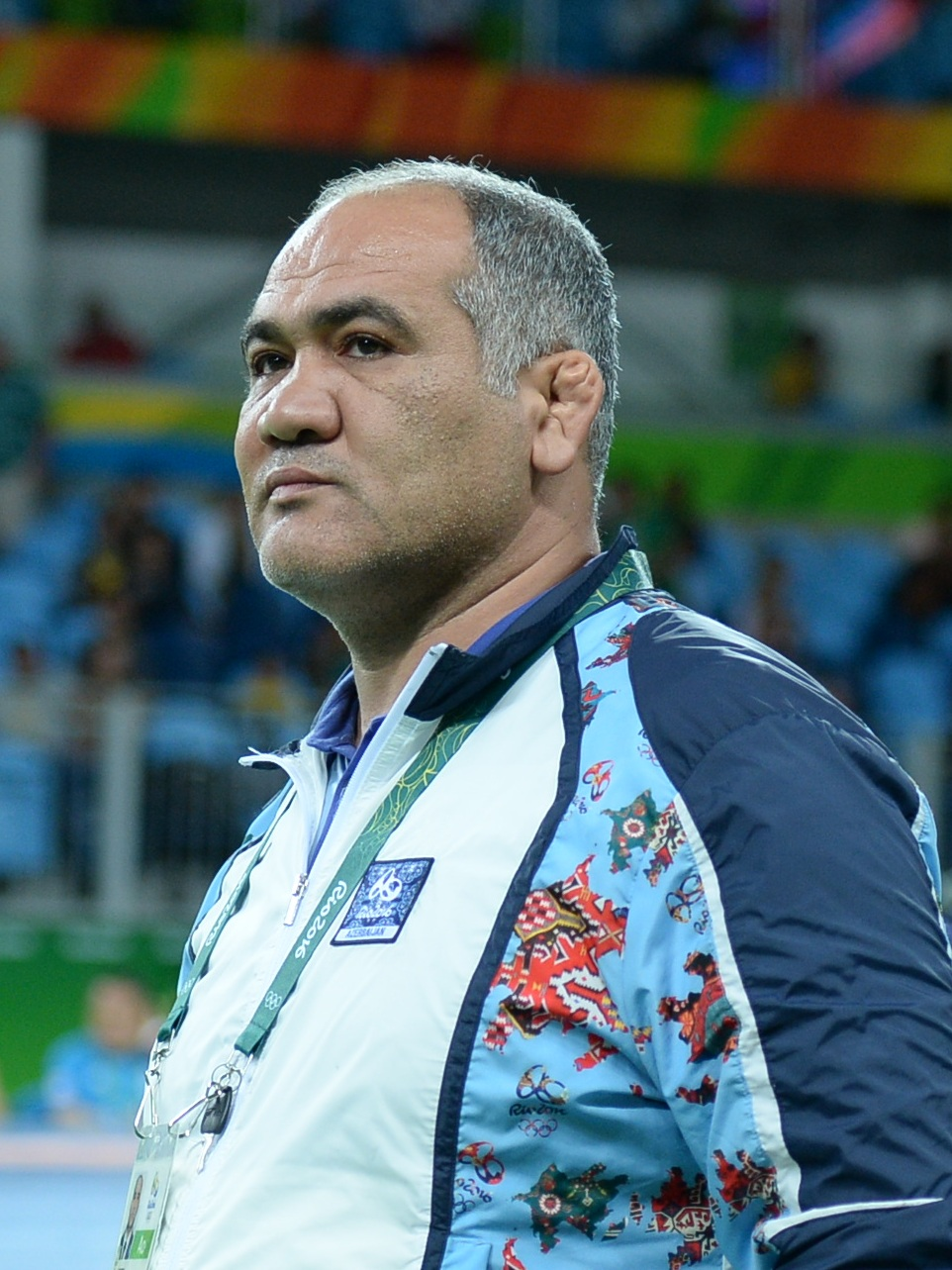

Personal information
- Nationality: Azerbaijan
- Citizenship: Azerbaijani
- Born: 5 January 1977; Qazax

Sport
- Sport: Wrestling

Firdovsi Umudov (Azerbaijani: Firdovsi Qəminalı oğlu Umudov; born 5 January 1977) is an Azerbaijani freestyle wrestling coach, senior coach of the Azerbaijani men's national freestyle wrestling team, Honored Coach of Azerbaijan, Master of Sports of international class, and member of the FILA Coaches Association and the Serhedchi Sports and Olympic Center ("Border Guard").

== Biography ==
In 1990, Umudov began to engage in freestyle wrestling at the Kazakh regional Sports School. He became the winner of the championship of the republic in freestyle wrestling, held in the city of Ganja. In 2008, he began to hold the position of senior coach of the Azerbaijani national freestyle wrestling team. In 2009, he was awarded the title of the best coach of the year in Azerbaijan. In total, Umudov was awarded this title three times.

In 2012, the Azerbaijani freestyle wrestling team took 2 gold medals and one bronze medal at the Olympic Games in London, and 2 silver and 3 bronze medals at the 2016 Olympics in Rio de Janeiro. At the First European Games held in Baku in 2015, Azerbaijani freestyle wrestlers took 2 gold and 4 bronze awards.

In 2012, Firdovsi Umudov was awarded the Order of Glory for his high achievements at the XXX Summer Olympic Games in London, as well as for his services to the development of Azerbaijani sports. In the same year, the World Wrestling Association named him the best coach in the world. In 2015, Umudov was awarded the "Honorary Diploma of the President of the Republic of Azerbaijan" for his services to the development of Azerbaijani sports. In 2016, Umudov was awarded the Progress Medal by the decree of the President of Azerbaijan for his high achievements at the XXXI Summer Olympic Games in Rio de Janeiro, as well as for his services to the development of Azerbaijani sports.

In 2015, Umudov was awarded the rank of Lieutenant Colonel of the Border Troops of the Republic of Azerbaijan. In November 2016, after the head coach of the national team Saypulla Absaidov was appointed to the position of senior coach of the youth national team of Azerbaijan in freestyle wrestling, Umudov became the acting head coach of the national team of Azerbaijan in freestyle wrestling.

In January 2018, Umudov was appointed First Vice-president of the Azerbaijan Wrestling Federation.

On December 30, 2022, by Decree of the President of the Republic of Azerbaijan, he was awarded the honorary title of "Honored Worker of Physical Culture and Sports" for his services in the development of sports in Azerbaijan.
