= Ivan Yarygin Sports Palace =

Sports arena in Krasnoyarsk, Russia

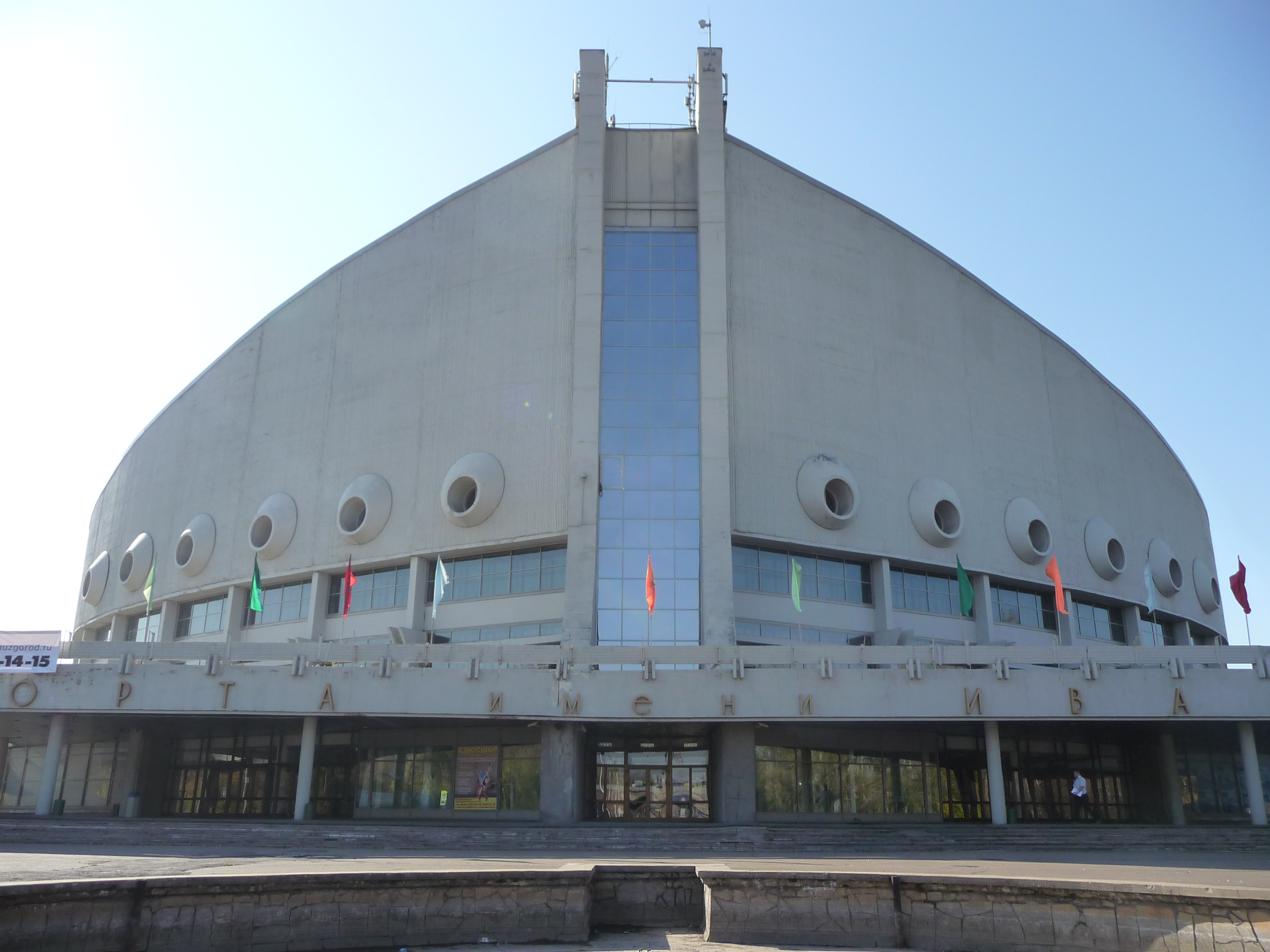
- Ivan Yarygin Sports Palace
- Interactive map of Ivan Yarygin Sports Palace
- Former names: Enisey Sports Palace
- Location: Krasnoyarsk, Russia
- Coordinates: 55.99547°N 92.87486°E
- Capacity: Basketball: 3,347; Wrestling: 5,000

Construction
- Opened: November 5, 1981
- Architect: Vitaly Orekhov

Tenant
- BC Enisey

The Ivan Yarigin sports palace is located in Krasnoyarsk, Russia, on an island in the Yenisei River. It was commissioned on 5 November 1981 as the "Enisey sports palace" and was designed by Vitaly Orekhov. The shape of the building resembles an old carvel ship, with its obtuse front, curvy sides and round windows. The venue can accommodate 3,300–5,000 spectators depending on the event. It was named for the Soviet wrestler Ivan Yarygin in 1998, and currently is the home arena of the basketball club BC Enisey.

The palace hosted the Winter Spartakiad of the Peoples of the USSR in 1982 and 1986. It supported national and international competitions in figure skating, wrestling, badminton, acrobatics, basketball, artistic gymnastics, boxing, ice hockey, karate and many other sports. The venue was reconstructed before the 1997 World Wrestling Championships, and ten years later hosted the Wrestling World Cup. It is open not only to competitions and shows, but also to daily training and rehabilitation activities. Two youth Olympic schools, for wrestling and weightlifting, are based there.

The facilities of the palace include

- all-purpose arena, 2,275 square metres (24,490 sq ft)
- choreography class, 203 square metres (2,190 sq ft)
- all-purpose gym, 184 square metres (1,980 sq ft)
- martial arts gym
- weightlifting gym
- wrestling gym
