= Les Gutches =

American freestyle wrestler (born 1973)

Personal information
- Full name: Leslie Lyle Gutches
- Born: February 21, 1973 (age 53) Medford, Oregon, U.S.

Sport
- Country: United States
- Sport: Wrestling
- Events: Freestyle and Folkstyle
- College team: Oregon State
- Club: Sunkist Kids Wrestling Club
- Team: USA
Medal record
Men's freestyle wrestling
Representing the United States
World Championships
Gold medal – first place	1997 Krasnoyarsk	85 kg
Bronze medal – third place	1999 Ankara	85 kg
Goodwill Games
Gold medal – first place	1998 New York	85 kg
Pan American Games
Gold medal – first place	1999 Winnipeg	85 kg
Pan American Championships
Gold medal – first place	1993 Guatemala City	82 kg
Bronze medal – third place	1994 Mexico City	82 kg
Collegiate Wrestling
Representing the Oregon State Beavers
NCAA Division I Championships
Gold medal – first place	1995 Iowa City	177 lb
Gold medal – first place	1996 Minneapolis	177 lb

Leslie Lyle Gutches (born February 21, 1973) is an American former wrestler and coach. His accomplishments include becoming a World Champion in freestyle wrestling at the 1997 World Wrestling Championships, the Dan Hodge Trophy as the nation's best college wrestler in 1996, becoming the National Collegiate Athletic Association (NCAA) champion in the 177 lb. weight division in both 1995 and 1996, earning All-American status in 1994, 1995 & 1996, becoming a member of the 1996 United States Olympics freestyle wrestling team and winning numerous other tournaments and honors.

== Youth ==
Gutches grew up in a family of wrestlers with his father Les Senior, a retired Fire Captain, being the first Gutches state champion. Les's siblings are Jason, a chiropractor and Chad, a home builder. Les Gutches grew up in Southern Oregon and has the unique distinction of winning national championships in all of the wrestling age groups, including three Oregon state titles while a student at South Medford High School.

== College ==
Considered the university's best wrestler in modern history with a 134–10 record, Gutches had a tremendous collegiate wrestling career as a four-year letterman of the Oregon State Beavers wrestling team, culminating in winning the Dan Hodge Trophy as the best college wrestler in the United States in 1996. He placed 5th at the NCAA championships in 1994, and went on to win the title in both 1995 and 1996, with both championship years him going undefeated. This earned him All-American status each of the three years, which is awarded to the top 8 athletes in each weight class every year.

He graduated from Oregon State University with a Bachelor's degree in Physical Anthropology and a minor in German Language in 1996. Some years later he completed requirements for the bachelor's degree in German Literature, and in 2006 graduated with a Master's degree in Business Administration and was a member of the Beta Gamma Sigma Honor Society. He was also a three-time NCAA First-Team Academic All-American as an undergraduate.

== International ==
Gutches achieved his greatest accomplishment in 1997, when he won the gold medal in freestyle Wrestling at the 32nd FILA Wrestling World Championships, against Ukrainian Eldar Assanov in Krasnoyarsk. Gutches again was a World medalist again in 1999, when he won the bronze.

Other gold medal first-place finishes at international competitions were at the 1999 FILA Wrestling World Cup, the 1999 Pan American Games and the 1998 Goodwill Games.

Gutches was also a member of the U.S. freestyle wrestling 1996 Olympic team.

== Coaching ==
Gutches was a full-time assistant coach at Oregon State from 1996 to 1999, a volunteer coach in 2001, and again a full-time assistant coach in 2002–2006, coaching five wrestlers to All-American honors.

He was also an assistant coach for the United States National Team at the 2002 Freestyle World Cup, his team winning the title that year.

== Personal ==
In January 2010, it was announced that Gutches had been named the Director of Program Development for USA Wrestling. He was promoted to Associate Executive Director for Programs and Strategy in October 2012. Previously, he worked as a Commercial Loan Officer at Citizens Bank for four years, and lived in the Corvallis, Oregon region with his wife, the former Jennifer Busen, who played basketball at Oregon State. They presently live in Colorado Springs, Colorado with their daughter Alexis and son Logan. Gutches is one of the three founders of G3 Sports Performance Center in Corvallis, Oregon.

== Accomplishments ==
Gutches has won numerous wrestling tournaments, awards and honors, including:

- 1989 USA Junior Greco-Roman Championships (178 lb): 1st
- 1989 USA Cadet Greco-Roman Championships (182.5 lb): 1st
- 1991 FILA Junior World Greco-Roman Champion (198 lb): 1st
- 1992 FILA Junior World Freestyle Championships (198 lb): 1st
- 1993 FILA Junior World Freestyle Championships (180.5 lb): 1st
- 1993 USA University Freestyle Championships (180.5 lb): 1st
- 1994 USA University Freestyle Championships (180.5 lb): 1st
- 1994 NCAA Division I Collegiate Championships (177 lb): 5th
- 1994 NCAA Division I All-American (177 lb)
- 1995 NCAA Division I Collegiate Championships (177 lb): 1st
- 1995 NCAA Division I All-American (177 lb)
- 1996 NCAA Division I Collegiate Championships (177 lb): 1st (Outstanding Wrestler)
- 1996 NCAA Division I All-American (177 lb)
- 1996 Dan Hodge Trophy winner
- 1996 US Olympic Team Freestyle results (180.5 lb): 7th
- 1996 USA Senior Freestyle Championships (180.5 lb): 1st (Outstanding Wrestler)
- 1997 USA Senior Freestyle Championships (187.2 lb): 1st
- 1997 FILA World Championships (187 lb): 1st
- 1997 Athlete of the Year by the United States Olympic Committee
- 1998 USA Senior Freestyle Championships (187.2 lb): 1st (Outstanding Wrestler)
- 1998 Goodwill Games Freestyle Wrestling (187 lb): 1st
- 1998 FILA World Championships (187 lb): 7th
- 1999 Yasar Dogu Tournament (187.25 lb): 1st
- 1999 USA Senior Freestyle Championships (187.2 lb): 1st
- 1999 Pan American Games (187.2 lb): 1st
- 1999 FILA World Championships (187 lb): 3rd
- 2000 USA Senior Freestyle Championships (187.2 lb): 1st

=== Hall of Fame inductions ===
- 2003 Oregon State University Sports Hall of Fame
- 2009 National Wrestling Hall of Fame as a Distinguished Member
- 2011 Oregon Sports Hall of Fame
- 2012 Medford Sports Hall of Fame
