= Gabriel Szerda =

Australian wrestler

Personal information
- Nationality: Australian
- Born: 14 August 1977 (age 48) Dunajská Streda, Slovakia

Sport
- Sport: Wrestling

Gabriel Szerda (born 14 August 1977) is an Australian wrestler. He competed in the men's freestyle 97 kg at the 2000 Summer Olympics.
