= Heiko Balz =

German freestyle wrestler

Personal information
- Born: 17 September 1969 (age 56) Burg bei Magdeburg, East Germany
- Height: 1.88 m (6 ft 2 in)
- Weight: 104 kg (229 lb)

Sport
- Sport: Wrestling
- Event: Freestyle
- Club: 1. Sportclub Luckenwalde
- Coached by: Fred Hempel
Medal record
Men's freestyle wrestling
Representing Germany
Olympic Games
Silver medal – second place	1992 Barcelona	100 kg
World Championships
Bronze medal – third place	1991 Varna	100 kg
Bronze medal – third place	1993 Toronto	100 kg
European Championships
Bronze medal – third place	1991 Aschaffenburg	100 kg
Silver medal – second place	1992 Tampere	100 kg
Silver medal – second place	1994 Tampere	100 kg
Silver medal – second place	1996 Tampere	90 kg

Heiko Balz (born 17 September 1969) is a German Freestyle wrestler. He won a silver medal at the 1992 Summer Olympics.
