= 1997 World Wrestling Championships =

Freestyle
- Host city: Krasnoyarsk, Russia
- Dates: 28–31 August 1997
- Stadium: Yenisey Sports Palace

Greco-Roman
- Host city: Wrocław, Poland
- Dates: 10–13 September 1997
- Stadium: Hala Ludowa

Women
- Host city: Clermont-Ferrand, France
- Dates: 10–12 July 1997
- Stadium: Clermont-Ferrand Sports Hall

Champions
- Freestyle: Russia
- Greco-Roman: Russia
- Women: Japan

The following is the final results of the 1997 World Wrestling Championships. Men's Freestyle competition were held in Krasnoyarsk, Russia. Men's Greco-Roman competition were held in Wrocław, Poland and Women's competition were held in Clermont-Ferrand, France.

== Medal table ==
| Rank | Nation | Gold | Silver | Bronze | Total |
|---|---|---|---|---|---|
| 1 | Russia | 5 | 3 | 2 | 10 |
| 2 | Turkey | 3 | 2 | 0 | 5 |
| 3 | France | 2 | 0 | 1 | 3 |
| 3 | Iran | 2 | 0 | 1 | 3 |
| 5 | United States | 1 | 4 | 0 | 5 |
| 6 | Cuba | 1 | 1 | 2 | 4 |
| 7 | Japan | 1 | 1 | 1 | 3 |
| 8 | Armenia | 1 | 1 | 0 | 2 |
| 8 | South Korea | 1 | 1 | 0 | 2 |
| 10 | Poland | 1 | 0 | 3 | 4 |
| 11 | Canada | 1 | 0 | 1 | 2 |
| 11 | China | 1 | 0 | 1 | 2 |
| 11 | Kazakhstan | 1 | 0 | 1 | 2 |
| 14 | Finland | 1 | 0 | 0 | 1 |
| 15 | Germany | 0 | 2 | 3 | 5 |
| 16 | Hungary | 0 | 2 | 0 | 2 |
| 17 | Ukraine | 0 | 1 | 1 | 2 |
| 18 | Belarus | 0 | 1 | 0 | 1 |
| 18 | North Korea | 0 | 1 | 0 | 1 |
| 18 | Norway | 0 | 1 | 0 | 1 |
| 18 | Uzbekistan | 0 | 1 | 0 | 1 |
| 22 | Bulgaria | 0 | 0 | 2 | 2 |
| 23 | Georgia | 0 | 0 | 1 | 1 |
| 23 | Romania | 0 | 0 | 1 | 1 |
| 23 | Sweden | 0 | 0 | 1 | 1 |
| Totals (25 entries) | | 22 | 22 | 22 | 66 |

== Team ranking ==
| Rank | Men's freestyle | | Men's Greco-Roman | | Women's freestyle | |
| Rank | Team | Points | Team | Points | Team | Points |
|---|---|---|---|---|---|---|
| 1 | Russia | 61 | Russia | 60 | Japan | 44 |
| 2 | Ukraine | 45 | Turkey | 38 | France | 41 |
| 3 | Iran | 40 | Germany | 31 | United States | 33 |
| 4 | Turkey | 30 | Bulgaria | 28 | China | 25 |
| 5 | Cuba | 30 | Cuba | 25 | Germany | 25 |
| 6 | United States | 29 | Ukraine | 25 | Russia | 24 |
| 7 | Uzbekistan | 25 | Hungary | 24 | Norway | 22 |
| 8 | South Korea | 20 | Kazakhstan | 22 | Canada | 21 |
| 9 | Bulgaria | 19 | Poland | 21 | Ukraine | 21 |
| 10 | Kazakhstan | 18 | South Korea | 18 | Poland | 18 |

== Medal summary ==
=== Men's freestyle ===
| Event | Gold | Silver | Bronze |
|---|---|---|---|
| 54 kg | Wilfredo García; Cuba | Jin Ju-dong; North Korea | Maulen Mamyrov; Kazakhstan |
| 58 kg | Mohammad Talaei; Iran | Ramil Islamov; Uzbekistan | Guivi Sissaouri; Canada |
| 63 kg | Abbas Hajkenari; Iran | Cary Kolat; United States | Magomed Azizov; Russia |
| 69 kg | Arayik Gevorgyan; Armenia | Hwang Sang-ho; South Korea | Zaza Zazirov; Ukraine |
| 76 kg | Buvaisar Saitiev; Russia | Alexander Leipold; Germany | Miroslav Gochev; Bulgaria |
| 85 kg | Les Gutches; United States | Eldar Assanov; Ukraine | Alireza Heidari; Iran |
| 97 kg | Kuramagomed Kuramagomedov; Russia | Ahmet Doğu; Turkey | Eldar Kurtanidze; Georgia |
| 130 kg | Zekeriya Güçlü; Turkey | Alexis Rodríguez; Cuba | David Musulbes; Russia |

=== Men's Greco-Roman ===
| Event | Gold | Silver | Bronze |
|---|---|---|---|
| 54 kg | Ercan Yıldız; Turkey | Vahan Juharyan; Armenia | Alfred Ter-Mkrtchyan; Germany |
| 58 kg | Yuriy Melnichenko; Kazakhstan | Rafik Simonyan; Russia | Armen Nazaryan; Bulgaria |
| 63 kg | Şeref Eroğlu; Turkey | Nikolay Monov; Russia | Włodzimierz Zawadzki; Poland |
| 69 kg | Son Sang-pil; South Korea | Aleksandr Tretyakov; Russia | Ender Memet; Romania |
| 76 kg | Marko Yli-Hannuksela; Finland | Tamás Berzicza; Hungary | Filiberto Azcuy; Cuba |
| 85 kg | Sergey Tsvir; Russia | Hamza Yerlikaya; Turkey | Thomas Zander; Germany |
| 97 kg | Gogi Koguashvili; Russia | Anatoly Fedorenko; Belarus | Andrzej Wroński; Poland |
| 130 kg | Aleksandr Karelin; Russia | Mihály Deák-Bárdos; Hungary | Héctor Milián; Cuba |

=== Women's freestyle ===
| Event | Gold | Silver | Bronze |
|---|---|---|---|
| 46 kg | Zhong Xiue; China | Mette Barlie; Norway | Farah Touchi; France |
| 51 kg | Joanna Piasecka; Poland | Shannon Williams; United States | Miho Adachi; Japan |
| 56 kg | Anna Gomis; France | Mariko Shimizu; Japan | Sara Eriksson; Sweden |
| 62 kg | Lise Golliot; France | Stéphanie Groß; Germany | Małgorzata Bassa; Poland |
| 68 kg | Christine Nordhagen; Canada | Sandra Bacher; United States | Nina Englich; Germany |
| 75 kg | Kyoko Hamaguchi; Japan | Kristie Stenglein; United States | Liu Dongfeng; China |

== Participating nations ==
=== Men's freestyle ===
220 competitors from 45 nations participated.

- Armenia (5)
- Australia (5)
- Azerbaijan (6)
- Belarus (8)
- Brazil (2)
- Bulgaria (6)
- Canada (8)
- China (7)
- Colombia (2)
- Cuba (8)
- Estonia (1)
- Finland (3)
- France (2)
- Georgia (7)
- Germany (7)
- Great Britain (2)
- Greece (5)
- Hungary (5)
- Iran (8)
- Israel (1)
- Italy (3)
- Japan (8)
- Kazakhstan (8)
- Kyrgyzstan (7)
- Latvia (2)
- Lithuania (1)
- Macedonia (5)
- Mexico (2)
- Moldova (1)
- Mongolia (8)
- Netherlands (1)
- North Korea (2)
- Poland (6)
- Romania (3)
- Russia (8)
- Slovakia (4)
- South Africa (2)
- South Korea (8)
- Switzerland (3)
- Tajikistan (1)
- Turkey (8)
- Ukraine (8)
- United States (8)
- Uzbekistan (7)
- Venezuela (8)

=== Men's Greco-Roman ===
227 competitors from 47 nations participated.

- Armenia (5)
- Austria (2)
- Azerbaijan (4)
- Belarus (7)
- Bulgaria (6)
- China (6)
- Colombia (2)
- Croatia (2)
- Cuba (6)
- Czech Republic (8)
- Denmark (1)
- Estonia (6)
- Finland (7)
- France (6)
- Georgia (8)
- Germany (8)
- Greece (8)
- Hungary (7)
- Israel (3)
- Italy (3)
- Jamaica (1)
- Japan (8)
- Kazakhstan (5)
- Kyrgyzstan (3)
- Latvia (3)
- Lithuania (1)
- Mexico (4)
- Moldova (2)
- Netherlands (2)
- North Korea (1)
- Norway (2)
- Poland (8)
- Portugal (2)
- Romania (6)
- Russia (8)
- Slovakia (4)
- South Korea (8)
- Spain (2)
- Sweden (8)
- Switzerland (2)
- Tajikistan (1)
- Turkey (8)
- Ukraine (8)
- United States (8)
- Uzbekistan (4)
- Venezuela (8)
- Yugoslavia (5)

=== Women's freestyle ===
92 competitors from 21 nations participated.

- Australia (5)
- Austria (4)
- Bulgaria (3)
- Canada (5)
- China (5)
- Chinese Taipei (6)
- Czech Republic (2)
- France (6)
- Germany (5)
- Greece (3)
- Italy (5)
- Japan (6)
- Norway (4)
- Poland (4)
- Russia (6)
- Sweden (2)
- Switzerland (1)
- Tunisia (3)
- Ukraine (6)
- United States (6)
- Venezuela (5)
