= Ali Özen =

Turkish wrestler

Personal information
- Nationality: Turkish
- Born: 18 July 1971 (age 55)

Sport
- Sport: Wrestling

Ali Özen (born 18 July 1971) is a Turkish wrestler. He competed in the men's freestyle 85 kg at the 2000 Summer Olympics.
