= Ričardas Pauliukonis =

Lithuanian wrestler (born 1974)

Personal information
- Nationality: Lithuanian
- Born: 31 July 1974 (age 52)

Sport
- Sport: Wrestling

Ričardas Pauliukonis (born 31 July 1974) is a Lithuanian wrestler. He competed at the 1996 Summer Olympics and the 2000 Summer Olympics.
