= George Torchinava =

Dutch wrestler

Personal information
- Nationality: Dutch
- Born: 6 July 1974 (age 52) Tbilisi, Georgia

Sport
- Sport: Wrestling

George Torchinava (born 6 July 1974) is a Dutch wrestler. He competed in the men's freestyle 97 kg at the 2000 Summer Olympics.
