= Plamen Paskalev =

Bulgarian wrestler

Plamen Paskalev (Bulgarian: Пламен Паскалев; born July 23, 1975) is a double Olympian who competed in Freestyle Wrestling for Bulgaria in the 1996 Summer Olympics and the 2000 Summer Olympics. He also represented Bulgaria at the Wrestling World Championships in 1994 and 1997–1999.

Paskalev placed 4th in the 96 Olympics, after losing the bronze medal match. He finished 16th in 2000. His highest placing in the world championships was 7th in 1999.

Paskalev wrestled collegiately at University of Central Missouri. He was a 3x All-American, placing 4th (285 lbs. in 2003), 3rd (197 lbs. in 2005) and was an undefeated (18–0) NCAA Div II National Champion at 197 lbs. in 2006. He is member of the UCM Athletic Hall of Fame
