= Aftantil Xanthopoulos =

Greek wrestler

Personal information
- Nationality: Greek
- Born: 16 November 1971 (age 54) Kutaisi, Georgia

Sport
- Sport: Wrestling

Aftantil Xanthopoulos (born 16 November 1971) is a Greek wrestler. He competed in the men's freestyle 97 kg at the 2000 Summer Olympics.
