= Rolf Scherrer =

Swiss freestyle wrestler

Personal information
- Full name: Rolf Scherrer
- Nationality: Switzerland
- Born: 24 May 1972 (age 54) Willisau, Switzerland
- Height: 1.79 m (5 ft 10 1/2 in)
- Weight: 100 kg (220 lb)

Sport
- Style: Freestyle
- Club: Ringerclub Willisau
- Coach: Erwin Mühlemann

Rolf Scherrer (born 24 May 1972 in Willisau) is a retired amateur Swiss freestyle wrestler, who competed in the men's heavyweight category. Scherrer has achieved a total of eighteen Swiss championship titles, picked up the top eight spot at the World Championships (2002), and represented his nation Switzerland in two editions of the Olympic Games (2000 and 2004). Before his wrestling career ended in 2009, Scherrer trained full-time for Ringerclub Willisau under his personal coach Erwin Mühlemann.

Scherrer made his official debut at the 2000 Summer Olympics in Sydney, where he competed in the men's heavyweight division (97 kg). He lost his opening match 1–7 to Iran's Alireza Heidari, but wrestled his way to overwhelm Turkey's Ahmet Doğu with a vigorous 4–3 verdict. Placing second in the prelim pool and tenth overall, Scherrer's performance was not enough to advance him to the quarterfinals.

At the 2004 Summer Olympics in Athens, Scherrer qualified for his second Swiss squad, as a 32-year-old, in the men's heavyweight class (96 kg) by placing fifth and receiving a berth from the Olympic Qualification Tournament in Bratislava, Slovakia. Unlike his previous Olympics, Scherrer suffered through a disastrous game plan, as he lost two straight matches each to Ukraine's Vadim Tasoyev (1–6), and Russia's Khadzhimurat Gatsalov (0–3), leaving him on the bottom pool and placing sixteenth overall.
