= Soslan Fraev =

Soslan Fraev (March 15, 1970) is a former competitor in freestyle wrestling who competed for both Russia and Uzbekistan.

In 1994 Fraev won the European Championships by defeating future mixed martial arts champion Vladimir Matyushenko in the finals.

Fraev was a runner up at the Asian Championships in 2000, and won a bronze in 1997 and 1999. Other notable achievements include a bronze at the 1998 Asian Games, the 1996 Wrestling World Cup and representing Uzbekistan at the Wrestling World Championships in 1997, 1998 and 1999. Fraev's highest placing here was 7th in 1997.
