= Wilfredo Morales =

Cuban wrestler (born 1971)

Personal information
- Born: 17 March 1971 (age 55) Havana, Cuba

Sport
- Sport: Wrestling
Medal record
Representing Cuba
Pan American Games
Gold medal – first place	1995 Mar del Plata	-100kg freestyle
Silver medal – second place	1999 Winnipeg	-97kg freestyle
Bronze medal – third place	2003 Santo Domingo	-96kg freestyle
Central American and Caribbean Games
Gold medal – first place	1993 Ponce	-100kg freestyle
Gold medal – first place	1998 Maracaibo	-97kg freestyle

Wilfredo Morales Suárez (born 17 March 1971) is a Cuban wrestler. He competed at the 1996 Summer Olympics and the 2000 Summer Olympics.
