= Gábor Kapuvári =

Hungarian wrestler

Personal information
- Nationality: Hungarian
- Born: 17 January 1974 (age 52) Budapest, Hungary

Sport
- Sport: Wrestling

Gábor Kapuvári (born 17 January 1974) is a Hungarian wrestler. He competed in the men's freestyle 85 kg at the 2000 Summer Olympics.
