= Marek Garmulewicz =

Polish freestyle wrestler (born 1968)

Marek Garmulewicz (born 22 January 1968 in Mozgawa) is a Polish former wrestler who competed in the 1992 Summer Olympics, in the 1996 Summer Olympics, in the 2000 Summer Olympics, and in the 2004 Summer Olympics.
