= Magomed Kurugliyev =

Kazakhstani freestyle wrestler (born 1974)

Magomed Chikhibubayevich Kurugliyev (Russian: Магомед Чихибубаевич Куруглиев; born 16 January 1974) is a Russian-born Kazakh freestyle wrestler who competed in the 1996 Summer Olympics, in the 2000 Summer Olympics, and in the 2004 Summer Olympics.

He won a bronze medal at the 2005 World Wrestling Championships. Other notable achievements include bronze medals at the 1998 Asian Games and 2006 Asian Games, as well as a silver medal at the 2002 Asian Games.
