= Davud Magomedov =

Azerbaijani wrestler

Personal information
- Nationality: Azerbaijani
- Born: 8 November 1970
- Died: 7 June 2005 (aged 34)

Sport
- Sport: Wrestling

Davud Magomedov (8 November 1970 – 7 June 2005) was an Azerbaijani wrestler. He competed at the 1996 Summer Olympics and the 2000 Summer Olympics.
