= Yang Hyung-mo =

South Korean wrestler (born 1971)

Medal record

Men's freestyle wrestling

Representing South Korea

Olympic Games
Silver medal – second place	1996 Atlanta	82 kg

Yang Hyung-mo (Korean: 양형모, born 23 March 1971) is a Korean former wrestler who competed in the 1996 Summer Olympics and in the 2000 Summer Olympics.
