= Eldar Kurtanidze =

Georgian wrestler (born 1972)

Medal record

Men's freestyle wrestling

Representing Georgia

Olympic Games
| Bronze medal – third place | 1996 Atlanta | 90 kg |
| Bronze medal – third place | 2000 Sydney | 97 kg |

World Championships
| Silver medal – second place | 1993 Toronto | 90 kg |
| Bronze medal – third place | 1997 Krasnoyarsk | 97 kg |
| Gold medal – first place | 2002 Tehran | 96 kg |
| Gold medal – first place | 2003 New York City | 96 kg |
| Silver medal – second place | 2005 Budapest | 96 kg |

European Championship
| Silver medal – second place | 1993 Istanbul | 90 kg |
| Silver medal – second place | 1995 Fribourg | 90 kg |
| Gold medal – first place | 1996 Budapest | 90 kg |
| Gold medal – first place | 1997 Warsaw | 97 kg |
| Gold medal – first place | 1998 Bratislava | 97 kg |
| Bronze medal – third place | 1999 Minsk | 97 kg |
| Gold medal – first place | 2001 Budapest | 97 kg |
| Silver medal – second place | 2002 Baku | 96 kg |
| Gold medal – first place | 2005 Varna | 96 kg |
| Bronze medal – third place | 2006 Moscow | 120 kg |

Eldar "Luka" Kurtanidze (Georgian: ელდარ [ლუკა] კურტანიძე) (born April 16, 1972, in Gulripshi, Georgian SSR) is a Georgian wrestler and the Georgian Dream political activist. He has served as the president of the Wrestling Federation of Georgia since December 2012 and Head of Physical Training at the Georgian Police Academy since January 2013.

== Wrestling career ==
Kurtanidze has been a senior professional freestyle wrestler since 1992. He was a bronze medalist in both the Men's Freestyle 90 kg at the 1996 Summer Olympics and also Men's Freestyle 97 kg at the 2000 Summer Olympics. He also competed in the 2004 Summer Olympics, but was eliminated early. In addition to his Olympic bronzes, he has two gold medals, two silver medals, and one bronze medal from the FILA Senior World Championships. He has received five gold medals, three silver medals, and two bronze medals from the FILA Senior European Championships. In 2006 he raised his weight to compete in the 120 kg class. He made his mixed martial arts debut at the Pride Fighting Championships show on December 31, 2006, against veteran MMA fighter and former amateur wrestler Kazuyuki Fujita. He was defeated via submission (strikes) at 2:09 of round 1.

== Political activism ==
Kurtanidze became involved in the politics of Georgia since 2011. As an ally of the opposition leader Nino Burjanadze he took part in the May 2011 rally against the government of President Mikheil Saakashvili. During the rally, he was involved in a clash with police and was severely beaten up. In 2012 he joined the Georgian Dream coalition led by the billionaire Bidzina Ivanishvili after whose accession to premiership after the 2012 parliamentary election Kurtanidze became the president of Georgia's Wrestling Federation and Head of Physical Training at the Georgian Police Academy. He has been accused of resorting to physical violence against his opponents in the Wrestling Federation.

== Mixed martial arts record ==
| Res. | Record | Opponent | Method | Event | Date | Round | Time | Location | Notes |
|---|---|---|---|---|---|---|---|---|---|
| Loss | 0-1 | (Japan) Kazuyuki Fujita | Submission (strikes) | Pride Shockwave 2006 | December 31, 2006 | 1 | 2:09 | | |
