= Igors Samušonoks =

Latvian wrestler (born 1972)

Medal record

Men's freestyle wrestling

Representing Latvia

European Championships
| Silver medal – second place | 1999 Minsk | 85 kg |

Igors Samusonoks (born November 6, 1972) is a former competitor in freestyle wrestling who represented Latvia at the 2000 Summer Olympics. He finished in 12th place at 85 kg.

At the junior level, Igors was a world champion in 1990. At the senior level, he represented Latvia at the World Wrestling Championships seven times from 1991 to 2003. His highest placing was 10th in 1991. Another major accomplishment was winning a silver medal at the 1999 European Championships.
