= Vadim Tasoyev =

Russian-Ukrainian freestyle wrestler

Personal information
- Full name: Vadim Zaurbekovych Tasoyev
- Nationality: Ukraine
- Born: 13 January 1975 (age 51) Vladikavkaz, Russian SFSR, Soviet Union
- Height: 1.82 m (5 ft 11 1/2 in)
- Weight: 96 kg (212 lb)

Sport
- Country: Russia; Ukraine
- Style: Freestyle
- Club: Olympik Kyiv
- Coach: Ruslan Savlokhov
Medal record
Men's freestyle wrestling
Representing Ukraine
World Championships
Bronze medal – third place	2001 Sofia	97 kg
Bronze medal – third place	2002 Tehran	97 kg
Bronze medal – third place	2007 Baku	120 kg
European Championships
Silver medal – second place	2004 Ankara	96 kg
Silver medal – second place	2005 Varna	96 kg
Bronze medal – third place	2000 Budapest	97 kg
Bronze medal – third place	2003 Riga	97 kg

Vadim Zaurbekovych Tasoyev (also Vadym Tasoiev, Ukrainian: Вадим Заурбекович Тасоєв; born January 13, 1975, in Vladikavkaz, Russian SFSR) is a retired amateur Russian-Ukrainian freestyle wrestler, who competed in the men's heavyweight category.

Considered one of Ukraine's top freestyle wrestlers in his decade, Tasoyev had claimed four career medals (two silver and two bronze) in the 96 and 97-kg division at the European Championships, picked up three bronze at the World Championships (2001, 2002, and 2007), and achieved top fifteen finishes in two editions of the Olympic Games (2000 and 2004). Throughout his sporting career, Tasoyev trained as a member of the freestyle wrestling team for Olympik Kyiv Sport Club, under his head coach Ruslan Savlokhov.

== Career ==
Tasoyev made his official debut at the 2000 Summer Olympics in Sydney, where he competed in the men's heavyweight division (97 kg). He lost his opening match to neighboring Russia's Sagid Murtazaliev, who later claimed the Olympic gold at the end of the tournament, without receiving a single point on the morning session, but wrestled his way to edge out U.S. wrestler and two-time Olympian Melvin Douglas with a 5–1 decision. Finishing second in the prelim pool and eleventh overall, Tasoyev's performance fell short to put him further into the quarterfinals.

Shortly after his first Games, Tasoyev emerged into the global scene with a blistering bronze medal effort in the men's 97-kg division at the 2001 World Wrestling Championships in Sofia, Bulgaria, and then continued to deliver another one at the same tournament in Tehran, Iran by the following year. With two medals added to his career hardware, Tasoyev entered the 2003 World Wrestling Championships and came strong as a top medal contender. Though he finished eighth in the men's heavyweight division, he was officially selected to the Ukrainian Olympic team, and earned a ticket to his second Olympics.

At the 2004 Summer Olympics in Athens, Tasoyev qualified for his second Ukrainian squad, as a 29-year-old, in the men's heavyweight class (96 kg) by receiving a berth and placing eighth from the World Championships. In the prelim pool, Tasoyev eclipsed Switzerland's Rolf Scherrer with a 6–1 decision on his opening bout, but could not grapple Russian wrestler and defending European champion Khadzhimurat Gatsalov into the ring, as he had been beaten by his fresh opponent without collecting a single point. Tasoyev failed to advance further into the quarterfinals after finishing the pool in second place and fourteenth overall.

Tasoyev moved up to the super heavyweight class from 96 kg after his second Games, and was determined to fight against his formidable opponents at the 2007 World Wrestling Championships, where he picked up his third career medal. He sought to compete for his third Olympic bid in Beijing, but decided to officially announce his retirement from wrestling for personal and political reasons.
