= Eldar Assanov =

Ukrainian freestyle wrestler

Medal record

Representing Ukraine

Men's freestyle wrestling

World Wrestling Championships
Silver medal – second place	1997 Krasnoyarsk	85 kg

Military Games
Bronze medal – third place	1995 Rome	82 kg
Bronze medal – third place	1999 Zagreb	85 kg

Eldar Assanov (born August 22, 1974) is a former competitor in Freestyle wrestling for Ukraine. His major accomplishment was a silver medal in the 1997 World Wrestling Championships.

He also won a bronze medal at the 1995 World Military Games, and again at the 1999 World Military Games. He was a world champion at the espoir level in 1993, European champion at the junior level in 1991, and European champion at the espoir level in 1994.
