= Tatsuo Kawai (wrestler) =

Japanese wrestler (born 1973)

Personal information
- Nationality: Japanese
- Born: 2 May 1973 (age 53) Meiwa, Japan

Sport
- Sport: Wrestling

Tatsuo Kawai (川合 達夫, Kawai Tatsuo; born 2 May 1973) is a Japanese wrestler. He competed at the 1996 Summer Olympics and the 2000 Summer Olympics.
