= Magomed Ibragimov (wrestler, born 1974) =

Olympic wrestler

Mogamed Ibragimov
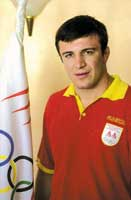

Personal information
- Native name: Могамед Ибрагимов
- Born: Mogamed Ibragimkhalilovich Ibragimov; 22 July 1974 (age 52) Makhachkala, Dagestan ASSR, Russian SFSR, Soviet Union
- Height: 180 cm (5 ft 11 in)
- Weight: 85 kg (187 lb)

Sport
- Country: Azerbaijan; Macedonia
- Sport: Wrestling
- Event: Freestyle wrestling
- Club: Jaka Buchim, Radoviš, MKD
- Coached by: Shevalye Nusuev
Medal record
Men's freestyle wrestling
Representing Macedonia
Olympic Games
Bronze medal – third place	2000 Sydney	85 kg
World Championships
Silver medal – second place	1998 Tehran	85 kg
- Updated on 7.02.2013

Mogamed Ibragimkhalilovich Ibragimov (Azerbaijani: Məhəmməd İbrahimxəlil oğlu İbrahimov; Russian: Магомед Ибрагимхалилович Ибрагимов; Macedonian: Могамед Ибрагимхалилович Ибрагимов; born 22 July 1974) is a Russian-born Macedonian wrestler.

At the 1996 Summer Olympics he competed for Azerbaijan and finished fifth in the freestyle 82 kg event.

He competed in the freestyle 85 kg competition at the 2000 Summer Olympics and won the bronze medal. He competed for Macedonia and became the first medalist for his country.

Four years later at the 2004 Summer Olympics he finished nineteenth in the freestyle 84 kg contest after being eliminated in the first round.
