= Khadzhimurad Magomedov =

Russian freestyle wrestler

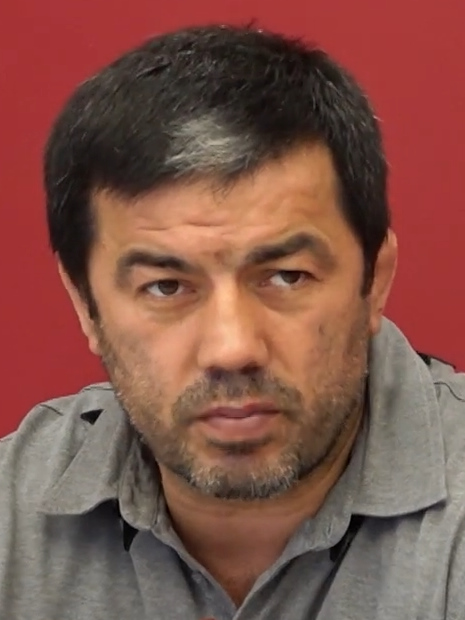
- Magomedov in 2020

Medal record

Men's freestyle wrestling

Representing Russia

Olympic Games
Gold medal – first place	1996 Atlanta	82 kg

World Championships
Gold medal – first place	Sofia 2001	85 kg
Silver medal – second place	Ankara 1999	85 kg

European Championships
Gold medal – first place	Warsaw 1997	85 kg
Bronze medal – third place	Budapest 1996	82 kg

Khadzhimurad Magomedov (born 24 February 1974, Makhachkala, Dagestan ASSR) is a Russian wrestler and Olympic champion in Freestyle wrestling.

== International career ==
Magomedov competed at the 1996 Summer Olympics in Atlanta where he received a gold medal in Freestyle wrestling, the middleweight class.

Magomedov also became world champion at the 2001 World Wrestling Championships. He won a silver medal in 1999, and in 2 other appearances, 1997 and 1998, he finished in 4th place. Other notable achievements include winning the European Championships in 1997 and the World Military Games in 1999.
