= Wrestling at the 2000 Summer Olympics – Qualification =

This article details the Wrestling at the 2000 Summer Olympics qualifying phase.

The 1999 World Championships was the first stage of a three-phase qualification system for wrestling at the 2000 Olympics.

For the first time FILA introduced a new qualification system. Five qualification tournaments were held in each style. Three of the five events counted towards each nation's total at each weight class. Athletes scored points for their nation at each event, based upon their placing at the weight class.

== Timeline ==
| Event | | Date | Venue |
|---|---|---|---|
| 1999 World Championships | Greco-Roman | September 23–26, 1999 | Athens, Greece |
| 1999 World Championships | Freestyle | October 7–10, 1999 | Ankara, Turkey |
| Qualification Tournaments; Ranking Series | Greco-Roman | January 22–23, 2000 | Faenza, Italy |
| Qualification Tournaments; Ranking Series | Greco-Roman | February 5–6, 2000 | Clermont-Ferrand, France |
| Qualification Tournaments; Ranking Series | Greco-Roman | February 19–20, 2000 | Tashkent, Uzbekistan |
| Qualification Tournaments; Ranking Series | Greco-Roman | March 4–5, 2000 | Colorado Springs, United States |
| Qualification Tournaments; Ranking Series | Greco-Roman | March 18–19, 2000 | Alexandria, Egypt |
| Qualification Tournaments; Ranking Series | Freestyle | January 29–30, 2000 | Minsk, Belarus |
| Qualification Tournaments; Ranking Series | Freestyle | February 12–13, 2000 | Leipzig, Germany |
| Qualification Tournaments; Ranking Series | Freestyle | February 26–27, 2000 | Tokyo, Japan |
| Qualification Tournaments; Ranking Series | Freestyle | March 11–12, 2000 | Querétaro, Mexico |
| Qualification Tournaments; Ranking Series | Freestyle | March 25–26, 2000 | Alexandria, Egypt |
| 2000 European Championships | Freestyle | April 6–9, 2000 | Budapest, Hungary |
| 2000 European Championships | Greco-Roman | April 14–16, 2000 | Moscow, Russia |
| 2000 Asian Championships | Freestyle | April 26–28, 2000 | Guilin, China |
| 2000 Asian Championships | Greco-Roman | May 5–7, 2000 | Seoul, South Korea |
| 2000 Oceania Championships | | May 13–14, 2000 | Melbourne, Australia |
| 2000 Pan American Championships | | May 22–27, 2000 | Cali, Colombia |
| 2000 African Championships | | May 26–29, 2000 | Tunis, Tunisia |

== Qualification summary ==
| NOC | Men's freestyle | | | | | | | | Men's Greco-Roman | | | | | | | | Total |
| NOC | 54 | 58 | 63 | 69 | 76 | 85 | 97 | 130 | 54 | 58 | 63 | 69 | 76 | 85 | 97 | 130 | Total |
|---|---|---|---|---|---|---|---|---|---|---|---|---|---|---|---|---|---|
| Algeria | | | | | | | | | | | X | | X | | | | 2 |
| Armenia | | X | X | X | | | | | | X | X | | X | | X | X | 8 |
| Australia | | X | X | X | X | X | X | X | | X | | X | | X | X | X | 12 |
| Azerbaijan | X | X | X | | X | | X | X | X | | | X | X | | | | 9 |
| Belarus | X | X | X | X | | X | X | X | | X | X | X | X | X | X | X | 14 |
| Bulgaria | X | | X | X | X | | | X | | X | | | | | X | X | 8 |
| Canada | | X | | X | | X | X | | | | | | | | | | 4 |
| China | | | | | | | | X | X | X | X | | | | | X | 5 |
| Colombia | | | | X | | | | | | | | | | | | | 1 |
| Cuba | X | | X | X | X | X | X | X | X | | X | X | | X | X | X | 13 |
| Czech Republic | | | | | | | | | X | | | | | | X | X | 3 |
| Egypt | X | | | | | | | X | X | | | | | X | | | 4 |
| Estonia | | | | | | | | | | | | X | | X | | X | 3 |
| Finland | | | | | | | | | X | | | X | X | X | | | 4 |
| France | | | | | | | | | | X | | X | X | | | | 3 |
| Georgia | | X | X | X | X | | X | X | X | X | X | | X | X | X | X | 13 |
| Germany | X | X | X | | X | | X | X | X | X | | X | | X | | | 10 |
| Greece | X | X | | X | | | X | X | | | | | X | | X | | 7 |
| Guinea-Bissau | | X | | | | | | | | | | | | | | | 1 |
| Hungary | | | | | X | X | | X | | X | | X | X | X | | X | 8 |
| India | | | | | | | | | | | X | | | | | | 1 |
| Iran | X | X | X | X | X | X | X | X | X | X | | X | | | | | 11 |
| Israel | | | | | | | | | | | X | | | X | | X | 3 |
| Italy | | | | | | | | | | | X | | | | | X | 2 |
| Ivory Coast | | | | | | X | | | | | | | | | | | 1 |
| Japan | X | | X | X | | X | | | | X | X | X | X | | | | 8 |
| Kazakhstan | X | X | | X | X | X | X | | X | X | X | | X | | X | | 11 |
| Kyrgyzstan | X | | X | X | | | | X | X | | | | | X | | | 6 |
| Latvia | | | | | | X | | | | | | | | | | | 1 |
| Lithuania | | | | | | | X | | | | | | | | X | | 2 |
| Macedonia | | | | | X | X | | | | | | | | | | | 2 |
| Moldova | X | X | X | X | | | | | | | | | | | | | 4 |
| Mongolia | X | X | | | X | | | X | | | | | | | | | 4 |
| Netherlands | | | | | | | X | | | | | | | | | | 1 |
| New Zealand | X | | | | | | | | X | | X | | | | | | 3 |
| Nigeria | | | | X | | | X | | | | | | | | | | 2 |
| North Korea | X | X | X | | | | | | X | | | | | | | | 4 |
| Norway | | | | | | | | | | | | | | X | | | 1 |
| Poland | | | | X | X | | X | | X | | X | X | X | | X | X | 9 |
| Romania | | | | | | X | | | X | X | | X | | | X | | 5 |
| Russia | X | X | X | X | X | X | X | X | X | X | X | X | X | X | X | X | 16 |
| Samoa | | | | | | | | | | | | | X | | | | 1 |
| Senegal | | | | | | X | | | | | | | | | | | 1 |
| Slovakia | | X | X | | X | | X | X | | | | | | | | | 5 |
| South Africa | | | | | X | | | | | | | | | | | | 1 |
| South Korea | X | | X | | X | X | | | X | X | X | X | X | | X | | 10 |
| Sweden | | | | | | | | | | | | X | X | X | X | X | 5 |
| Switzerland | | | | | | X | X | | | | X | | | | X | | 4 |
| Tunisia | | | | | | | | | | X | | | | X | X | X | 4 |
| Turkey | | X | | X | X | X | X | X | X | | X | | X | X | X | X | 12 |
| Turkmenistan | | | | | | | | | | X | | | | | | | 1 |
| Ukraine | X | X | X | X | X | X | X | X | X | X | X | X | X | X | X | X | 16 |
| United States | X | X | X | X | X | X | X | X | X | X | X | X | X | X | X | X | 16 |
| Uzbekistan | X | X | X | | X | X | | X | | X | X | X | X | X | | | 11 |
| Venezuela | | | | | | | | | | | | | | X | | X | 2 |
| Total: 55 NOCs | 20 | 20 | 19 | 20 | 20 | 20 | 20 | 20 | 20 | 20 | 20 | 19 | 20 | 20 | 20 | 20 | 318 |

== Men's freestyle events ==
=== 54 kg ===
| Competition | Places | Qualified wrestlers |
|---|---|---|
| 1999 World Championships | 8 | Kim Woo-yong (KOR); Adkhamjon Achilov (UZB); Oleksandr Zakharuk (UKR); Ivan Tsonov (BUL); Tümendembereliin Züünbayan (MGL); Leonid Chuchunov (RUS); Maulen Mamyrov (KAZ); Gholamreza Mohammadi (IRI) |
| Qualification Tournaments Ranking | 7 | Kyrgyzstan; Belarus; Japan; Azerbaijan; United States; Germany; Moldova |
| 2000 European Championships | 1 | Amiran Kardanov (GRE) |
| 2000 Asian Championships | 1 | Jin Ju-dong (PRK) |
| 2000 Oceania Championships | 1 | Martin Liddle (NZL) |
| 2000 Pan American Championships | 1 | Wilfredo García (CUB) |
| 2000 African Championships | 1 | Ali Mohamed Abutaleb (EGY) (Note: Unused quota) |
| Total | 20 | |

=== 58 kg ===
| Competition | Places | Qualified wrestlers |
|---|---|---|
| 1999 World Championships | 8 | Harun Doğan (TUR); Alireza Dabir (IRI); Damir Zakhartdinov (UZB); Martin Berberyan (ARM); Octavian Cuciuc (MDA); Miron Dzadzaev (RUS); Eric Guerrero (USA); Andrej Fašánek (SVK) |
| Qualification Tournaments Ranking | 7 | Mongolia; Azerbaijan; Ukraine; Kazakhstan; Germany; Belarus; Greece |
| 2000 European Championships | 1 | Otar Tushishvili (GEO) |
| 2000 Asian Championships | 1 | Ri Yong-sam (PRK) |
| 2000 Oceania Championships | 1 | Cory O'Brien (AUS) |
| 2000 Pan American Championships | 1 | Guivi Sissaouri (CAN) |
| 2000 African Championships | 1 | Talata Embalo (GBS) |
| Total | 20 | |

=== 63 kg ===
| Competition | Places | Qualified wrestlers |
|---|---|---|
| 1999 World Championships | 8 | Elbrus Tedeyev (UKR); Jang Jae-sung (KOR); Ramil Islamov (UZB); Cary Kolat (USA); Serafim Barzakov (BUL); Mohammad Talaei (IRI); Kim Kwang-il (PRK); Maksat Boburbekov (KGZ) |
| Qualification Tournaments Ranking | 7 | Moldova; Russia; Azerbaijan; Belarus; Germany; Georgia; Slovakia |
| 2000 European Championships | 1 | Arshak Hayrapetyan (ARM) |
| 2000 Asian Championships | 1 | Kazuyuki Miyata (JPN) |
| 2000 Oceania Championships | 1 | Musa Ilhan (AUS) |
| 2000 Pan American Championships | 1 | Carlos Ortiz (CUB) |
| 2000 African Championships | 1 | ~~Ahmed Houssam (EGY)~~ (Note: Disqualified for doping violation, the quota remained unused.) |
| Total | 20 | |

=== 69 kg ===
| Competition | Places | Qualified wrestlers |
|---|---|---|
| 1999 World Championships | 8 | Daniel Igali (CAN); Lincoln McIlravy (USA); Yüksel Şanlı (TUR); Emzar Bedineishvili (GEO); Arayik Gevorgyan (ARM); Nikolaos Loizidis (GRE); Yosvany Sánchez (CUB); Almaz Askarov (KGZ) |
| Qualification Tournaments Ranking | 7 | Russia; Iran; Belarus; Ukraine; Kazakhstan; Poland; Moldova |
| 2000 European Championships | 1 | Nikolay Paslar (BUL) |
| 2000 Asian Championships | 1 | Takahiro Wada (JPN) |
| 2000 Oceania Championships | 1 | Cameron Johnston (AUS) |
| 2000 Pan American Championships | 1 | Edison Hurtado (COL) |
| 2000 African Championships | 1 | Ibo Oziti (NGR) |
| Total | 20 | |

=== 76 kg ===
| Competition | Places | Qualified wrestlers |
|---|---|---|
| 1999 World Championships | 8 | Adam Saitiev (RUS); Alexander Leipold (GER); Adem Bereket (TUR); Joe Williams (USA); Elshad Allahverdiyev (AZE); Moon Eui-jae (KOR); Plamen Paskalev (BUL); Alik Muzaiev (UKR) |
| Qualification Tournaments Ranking | 7 | Uzbekistan; Poland; Kazakhstan; Hungary; Macedonia; Slovakia; Iran |
| 2000 European Championships | 1 | Guram Mchedlidze (GEO) |
| 2000 Asian Championships | 1 | Tümen-Ölziin Mönkhbayar (MGL) |
| 2000 Oceania Championships | 1 | Rein Ozoline (AUS) |
| 2000 Pan American Championships | 1 | Yosmany Romero (CUB) |
| 2000 African Championships | 1 | Jannie du Toit (RSA) |
| Total | 20 | |

=== 85 kg ===
| Competition | Places | Qualified wrestlers |
|---|---|---|
| 1999 World Championships | 8 | Yoel Romero (CUB); Khadzhimurad Magomedov (RUS); Les Gutches (USA); Ali Özen (TUR); Tatsuo Kawai (JPN); Rasul Katinovasov (UZB); Magomed Kurugliyev (KAZ); Yang Hyung-mo (KOR) |
| Qualification Tournaments Ranking | 7 | Ukraine; Hungary; Macedonia; Ivory Coast; Latvia; Romania; Switzerland |
| 2000 European Championships | 1 | Beibulat Musaev (BLR) |
| 2000 Asian Championships | 1 | Amir Reza Khadem (IRI) |
| 2000 Oceania Championships | 1 | Igor Praporshchikov (AUS) |
| 2000 Pan American Championships | 1 | Justin Abdou (CAN) |
| 2000 African Championships | 1 | Alioune Diouf (SEN) |
| Total | 20 | |

=== 97 kg ===
| Competition | Places | Qualified wrestlers |
|---|---|---|
| 1999 World Championships | 8 | Sagid Murtazaliev (RUS); Alireza Heidari (IRI); Marek Garmulewicz (POL); Aftantil Xanthopoulos (GRE); Kaşif Şakiroğlu (TUR); Eldar Kurtanidze (GEO); Wilfredo Morales (CUB); Davud Magomedov (AZE) |
| Qualification Tournaments Ranking | 7 | Germany; Ukraine; United States; Belarus; Slovakia; Switzerland; Lithuania |
| 2000 European Championships | 1 | George Torchinava (NED) |
| 2000 Asian Championships | 1 | Islam Bayramukov (KAZ) |
| 2000 Oceania Championships | 1 | Gabriel Szerda (AUS) |
| 2000 Pan American Championships | 1 | Dean Schmeichel (CAN) |
| 2000 African Championships | 1 | Victor Kodei (NGR) |
| Total | 20 | |

=== 130 kg ===
| Competition | Places | Qualified wrestlers |
|---|---|---|
| 1999 World Championships | 8 | Stephen Neal (USA); Andrey Shumilin (RUS); Abbas Jadidi (IRI); Rajab Ashabaliyev (AZE); Aydın Polatçı (TUR); Sven Thiele (GER); Aleksandr Kovalevsky (KGZ); Mirabi Valiyev (UKR) |
| Qualification Tournaments Ranking | 7 | Belarus; China; Georgia; Mongolia; Bulgaria; Hungary; Greece |
| 2000 European Championships | 1 | Peter Pecha (SVK) |
| 2000 Asian Championships | 1 | Artur Taymazov (UZB) |
| 2000 Oceania Championships | 1 | Mushtaq Abdullah (AUS) |
| 2000 Pan American Championships | 1 | Alexis Rodríguez (CUB) |
| 2000 African Championships | 1 | Hisham Abdelwahab (EGY) |
| Total | 20 | |

== Men's Greco-Roman events ==
=== 54 kg ===
| Competition | Places | Qualified wrestlers |
|---|---|---|
| 1999 World Championships | 8 | Lázaro Rivas (CUB); Ha Tae-yeon (KOR); Alfred Ter-Mkrtchyan (GER); Rakymzhan Assembekov (KAZ); Boris Ambartsumov (RUS); Kang Yong-gyun (PRK); Petr Švehla (CZE); Aleksandr Tsertsvadze (GEO) |
| Qualification Tournaments Ranking | 7 | China; Azerbaijan; Kyrgyzstan; Ukraine; Turkey; Finland; Poland |
| 2000 European Championships | 1 | Marian Sandu (ROM) |
| 2000 Asian Championships | 1 | Hassan Rangraz (IRI) |
| 2000 Oceania Championships | 1 | Jotham Pellew (NZL) |
| 2000 Pan American Championships | 1 | Brandon Paulson (USA) |
| 2000 African Championships | 1 | Mohamed Abou El-Ela (EGY) |
| Total | 20 | |

=== 58 kg ===
| Competition | Places | Qualified wrestlers |
|---|---|---|
| 1999 World Championships | 8 | Kim In-sub (KOR); Yuriy Melnichenko (KAZ); Armen Nazaryan (BUL); Igor Petrenko (BLR); Constantin Borăscu (ROM); Sheng Zetian (CHN); István Majoros (HUN); Dilshod Aripov (UZB) |
| Qualification Tournaments Ranking | 7 | France; Iran; Georgia; Armenia; Ukraine; Japan; Germany |
| 2000 European Championships | 1 | Valery Nikonorov (RUS) |
| 2000 Asian Championships | 1 | Nepes Gukulow (TKM) |
| 2000 Oceania Championships | 1 | Brett Cash (AUS) |
| 2000 Pan American Championships | 1 | Dennis Hall (USA) |
| 2000 African Championships | 1 | Mohamed Barguaoui (TUN) |
| Total | 20 | |

=== 63 kg ===
| Competition | Places | Qualified wrestlers |
|---|---|---|
| 1999 World Championships | 8 | Mkhitar Manukyan (KAZ); Şeref Eroğlu (TUR); Michael Beilin (ISR); Bakhodir Kurbanov (UZB); Eduard Aplevich (BLR); Riccardo Magni (ITA); Hrihoriy Kamyshenko (UKR); Park Young-shin (KOR) |
| Qualification Tournaments Ranking | 7 | Russia; Poland; Switzerland; United States; China; Japan; Georgia |
| 2000 European Championships | 1 | Vaghinak Galstyan (ARM) |
| 2000 Asian Championships | 1 | Gurbinder Singh (IND) |
| 2000 Oceania Championships | 1 | Rasoul Amani (NZL) |
| 2000 Pan American Championships | 1 | Juan Marén (CUB) |
| 2000 African Championships | 1 | Yassine Djakrir (ALG) |
| Total | 20 | |

=== 69 kg ===
| Competition | Places | Qualified wrestlers |
|---|---|---|
| 1999 World Championships | 8 | Son Sang-pil (KOR); Aleksandr Tretyakov (RUS); Vladimir Kopytov (BLR); Csaba Hirbik (HUN); Ghani Yalouz (FRA); Liubal Colás (CUB); Parviz Zeidvand (IRI); Rustam Adzhi (UKR) |
| Qualification Tournaments Ranking | 7 | Germany; Romania; Sweden; Finland; Poland; Azerbaijan; Japan |
| 2000 European Championships | 1 | Valeri Nikitin (EST) |
| 2000 Asian Championships | 1 | Ruslan Biktyakov (UZB) |
| 2000 Oceania Championships | 1 | Ali Abdo (AUS) |
| 2000 Pan American Championships | 1 | Heath Sims (USA) |
| 2000 African Championships | 1 | ~~Anwar Kandafil (MAR)~~ |
| Total | 20 | |

=== 76 kg ===
| Competition | Places | Qualified wrestlers |
|---|---|---|
| 1999 World Championships | 8 | Nazmi Avluca (TUR); Yvon Riemer (FRA); Dimitrios Avramis (GRE); Tarieli Melelashvili (GEO); Tamás Berzicza (HUN); Murat Kardanov (RUS); Ara Abrahamian (SWE); Levon Geghamyan (ARM) |
| Qualification Tournaments Ranking | 7 | Azerbaijan; Japan; Belarus; Poland; South Korea; Finland; Uzbekistan |
| 2000 European Championships | 1 | David Manukyan (UKR) |
| 2000 Asian Championships | 1 | Bakhtiyar Baiseitov (KAZ) |
| 2000 Oceania Championships | 1 | Faafetai Iutana (SAM) |
| 2000 Pan American Championships | 1 | Matt Lindland (USA) |
| 2000 African Championships | 1 | Kader Slila (ALG) (Note: Ahmed Fahmy from Egypt originally earned the quota, but tested positive for a banned substance.) |
| Total | 20 | |

=== 85 kg ===
| Competition | Places | Qualified wrestlers |
|---|---|---|
| 1999 World Championships | 8 | Luis Enrique Méndez (CUB); Thomas Zander (GER); Raatbek Sanatbayev (KGZ); Marko Asell (FIN); Martin Lidberg (SWE); Toomas Proovel (EST); Valery Tsilent (BLR); Quincey Clark (USA) (Note: Behrouz Jamshidi from Iran originally finished third and won the quota, but tested positive for a banned substance, the quota went to the ninth placed wrestler from USA.) |
| Qualification Tournaments Ranking | 7 | Russia; Turkey; Egypt; Norway; Ukraine; Hungary; Israel |
| 2000 European Championships | 1 | Mukhran Vakhtangadze (GEO) |
| 2000 Asian Championships | 1 | Yury Vitt (UZB) |
| 2000 Oceania Championships | 1 | Arek Olczak (AUS) |
| 2000 Pan American Championships | 1 | Eddy Bartolozzi (VEN) |
| 2000 African Championships | 1 | Amor Bach Hamba (TUN) |
| Total | 20 | |

=== 97 kg ===
| Competition | Places | Qualified wrestlers |
|---|---|---|
| 1999 World Championships | 8 | Gogi Koguashvili (RUS); Andrzej Wroński (POL); Mikael Ljungberg (SWE); Hakkı Başar (TUR); Gennady Chkhaidze (GEO); Urs Bürgler (SUI); Jason Klohs (USA); Marek Švec (CZE) |
| Qualification Tournaments Ranking | 7 | Lithuania; Bulgaria; Belarus; Romania; Greece; Armenia; Kazakhstan |
| 2000 European Championships | 1 | Davyd Saldadze (UKR) |
| 2000 Asian Championships | 1 | Park Woo (KOR) |
| 2000 Oceania Championships | 1 | Ben Vincent (AUS) |
| 2000 Pan American Championships | 1 | Reynaldo Peña (CUB) |
| 2000 African Championships | 1 | Hassene Fkiri (TUN) (Note: Karam Gaber from Egypt originally won the quota.) |
| Total | 20 | |

=== 130 kg ===
| Competition | Places | Qualified wrestlers |
|---|---|---|
| 1999 World Championships | 8 | Aleksandr Karelin (RUS); Héctor Milián (CUB); Sergei Mureiko (BUL); Giuseppe Giunta (ITA); Georgiy Saldadze (UKR); Dremiel Byers (USA); Mihály Deák-Bárdos (HUN); Haykaz Galstyan (ARM) |
| Qualification Tournaments Ranking | 7 | Turkey; Georgia; Israel; Poland; Belarus; Sweden; Estonia |
| 2000 European Championships | 1 | David Vála (CZE) |
| 2000 Asian Championships | 1 | Zhao Hailin (CHN) |
| 2000 Oceania Championships | 1 | Laszlo Kovacs (AUS) |
| 2000 Pan American Championships | 1 | Rafael Barreno (VEN) |
| 2000 African Championships | 1 | Omrane Ayari (TUN) |
| Total | 20 | |
