= 1998 World Wrestling Championships – Men's freestyle 76 kg =

Men's freestyle 76 kg at the 1998 World Championships
- Venue: Azadi Indoor Stadium
- Dates: 8–10 September 1998
- Competitors: 26 from 26 nations

Medalists
gold medal	Buvaisar Saitiev	Russia
silver medal	Moon Eui-jae	South Korea
bronze medal	Alexander Leipold	Germany

The men's freestyle 76 kilograms is a competition featured at the 1998 World Wrestling Championships, and was held at the Azadi Indoor Stadium in Tehran, Iran from 8 to 10 September 1998.

== Results ==
Legend

- WO — Won by walkover

=== Round 1 ===
	Score	
Round of 32
Sagid Katinovasov (UZB)	3–0	Guram Mchedlidze (UKR)
Marcin Jurecki (POL)	10–0	Thomas Coppola (GBR)
Marinos Koutoupis (CYP)	2–3	Ramazan Murtazaliyev (KAZ)
Eduard Alexeenko (BLR)	4–0	Kakhaber Verkhviachvili (CAN)
Kenji Koshiba (JPN)	1–3	Nuri Zengin (TUR)
Moon Eui-jae (KOR)	4–3	Nurbek Izabekov (KGZ)
Árpád Ritter (HUN)	5–2	Akber Ismailov (AZE)
Steve Marianetti (USA)	6–1	Jannie du Toit (RSA)
Pejman Dorostkar (IRI)	3–1	Tümen-Ölziin Mönkhbayar (MGL)
Miroslav Gochev (BUL)	0–3	Alexander Leipold (GER)
Victor Peicov (MDA)	0–10	Buvaisar Saitiev (RUS)
Rein Ozoline (AUS)	2–3	Aleksandre Kakhniashvili (GEO)
Felix Polianidis (GRE)	1–1	Radion Kertanti (SVK)

=== Round 2 ===
	Score	
Round of 16
Sagid Katinovasov (UZB)	1–3	Marcin Jurecki (POL)
Ramazan Murtazaliyev (KAZ)	1–2	Eduard Alexeenko (BLR)
Nuri Zengin (TUR)	1–5	Moon Eui-jae (KOR)
Árpád Ritter (HUN)	2–1 Ret	Steve Marianetti (USA)
Pejman Dorostkar (IRI)	0–2	Alexander Leipold (GER)
Buvaisar Saitiev (RUS)	12–1	Aleksandre Kakhniashvili (GEO)
Radion Kertanti (SVK)		Bye
Repechage
Guram Mchedlidze (UKR)	7–0	Thomas Coppola (GBR)
Marinos Koutoupis (CYP)	0–10	Kakhaber Verkhviachvili (CAN)
Kenji Koshiba (JPN)	3–4	Nurbek Izabekov (KGZ)
Akber Ismailov (AZE)	11–0	Jannie du Toit (RSA)
Tümen-Ölziin Mönkhbayar (MGL)	3–0	Victor Peicov (MDA)
Rein Ozoline (AUS)	0–3	Felix Polianidis (GRE)

=== Round 3 ===
	Score	
Quarterfinals
Radion Kertanti (SVK)	3–4	Marcin Jurecki (POL)
Eduard Alexeenko (BLR)	1–3	Moon Eui-jae (KOR)
Árpád Ritter (HUN)	0–3	Alexander Leipold (GER)
Buvaisar Saitiev (RUS)		Bye
Repechage
Guram Mchedlidze (UKR)	10–0	Kakhaber Verkhviachvili (CAN)
Nurbek Izabekov (KGZ)	3–1	Akber Ismailov (AZE)
Tümen-Ölziin Mönkhbayar (MGL)	7–0	Felix Polianidis (GRE)
Sagid Katinovasov (UZB)	6–0	Ramazan Murtazaliyev (KAZ)
Nuri Zengin (TUR)	0–1	Steve Marianetti (USA)
Pejman Dorostkar (IRI)	8–0	Aleksandre Kakhniashvili (GEO)

=== Round 4 ===
	Score	
Repechage
Guram Mchedlidze (UKR)	3–1	Nurbek Izabekov (KGZ)
Tümen-Ölziin Mönkhbayar (MGL)	10–5	Sagid Katinovasov (UZB)
Steve Marianetti (USA)	0–4	Pejman Dorostkar (IRI)
Radion Kertanti (SVK)	1–1	Eduard Alexeenko (BLR)
Árpád Ritter (HUN)		Bye

=== Round 5 ===
	Score	
Semifinals
Buvaisar Saitiev (RUS)	4–0 Fall	Marcin Jurecki (POL)
Moon Eui-jae (KOR)	2–1	Alexander Leipold (GER)
Repechage
Árpád Ritter (HUN)	2–3	Guram Mchedlidze (UKR)
Tümen-Ölziin Mönkhbayar (MGL)	3–0	Radion Kertanti (SVK)
Pejman Dorostkar (IRI)		Bye

=== Round 6 ===
	Score	
Repechage
Pejman Dorostkar (IRI)	1–0	Guram Mchedlidze (UKR)
Tümen-Ölziin Mönkhbayar (MGL)		Bye

=== Round 7 ===
	Score	
Repechage
Marcin Jurecki (POL)	WO	Pejman Dorostkar (IRI)
Tümen-Ölziin Mönkhbayar (MGL)	0–4 Fall	Alexander Leipold (GER)

=== Finals ===
	Score	
Bronze medal match
Pejman Dorostkar (IRI)	0–3	Alexander Leipold (GER)
Final
Buvaisar Saitiev (RUS)	3–0	Moon Eui-jae (KOR)
