= 1997 World Wrestling Championships – Men's freestyle 76 kg =

Men's freestyle 76 kg at the 1997 World Championships
- Venue: Yenisey Sports Palace
- Dates: 28–30 August 1997
- Competitors: 30 from 30 nations

Medalists
gold medal	Buvaisar Saitiev	Russia
silver medal	Alexander Leipold	Germany
bronze medal	Miroslav Gochev	Bulgaria

The men's freestyle 76 kilograms is a competition featured at the 1997 World Wrestling Championships, and was held at the Yenisey Sports Palace in Krasnoyarsk, Russia from 28 to 30 August 1997.

== Results ==
Legend

- WO — Won by walkover

=== Round 1 ===
	Score	
Round of 32
José Alberto Díaz (VEN)	0–11	Jannie du Toit (RSA)
Tümen-Ölziin Mönkhbayar (MGL)	1–1	Marcin Jurecki (POL)
Lazaros Loizidis (GRE)	0–4	Ruslan Khinchagov (UZB)
Alexander Leipold (GER)	14–2	Ari Kortehisto (FIN)
Buvaisar Saitiev (RUS)	8–1 Fall	Nick Ugoalah (CAN)
Árpád Ritter (HUN)	4–1 Fall	Nurbek Izabekov (KGZ)
Davyd Bichinashvili (UKR)	5–3	Magomed Kurugliyev (KAZ)
Kamil Kocaoğlu (TUR)	0–3	Miroslav Gochev (BUL)
Moon Eui-jae (KOR)	10–0	Thomas Coppola (GBR)
Dan St. John (USA)	5–0 Fall	Valerij Verhušin (MKD)
Rein Ozoline (AUS)	0–10	Aleksandre Kakhniashvili (GEO)
Amir Tavakkolian (IRI)	10–2	Wu Guang (CHN)
Eduard Alexeenko (BLR)	3–1	Vahagn Manukyan (ARM)
Küllo Kõiv (EST)	6–1	Leonardo Díaz (CUB)
Kenji Koshiba (JPN)	1–1 Ret	Christoph Feyer (SUI)

=== Round 2 ===
	Score	
Round of 16
Jannie du Toit (RSA)	0–10	Tümen-Ölziin Mönkhbayar (MGL)
Ruslan Khinchagov (UZB)	2–3	Alexander Leipold (GER)
Buvaisar Saitiev (RUS)	6–0	Árpád Ritter (HUN)
Davyd Bichinashvili (UKR)	2–0	Miroslav Gochev (BUL)
Moon Eui-jae (KOR)	6–2	Dan St. John (USA)
Aleksandre Kakhniashvili (GEO)	0–4	Amir Tavakkolian (IRI)
Eduard Alexeenko (BLR)	3–1	Küllo Kõiv (EST)
Repechage
José Alberto Díaz (VEN)	0–10	Marcin Jurecki (POL)
Lazaros Loizidis (GRE)	12–1	Ari Kortehisto (FIN)
Nick Ugoalah (CAN)	1–6	Nurbek Izabekov (KGZ)
Magomed Kurugliyev (KAZ)	1–4 Fall	Kamil Kocaoğlu (TUR)
Thomas Coppola (GBR)	1–5	Valerij Verhušin (MKD)
Rein Ozoline (AUS)	11–14	Wu Guang (CHN)
Vahagn Manukyan (ARM)	1–6	Leonardo Díaz (CUB)
Kenji Koshiba (JPN)		Bye

=== Round 3 ===
	Score	
Quarterfinals
Tümen-Ölziin Mönkhbayar (MGL)	0–4	Alexander Leipold (GER)
Buvaisar Saitiev (RUS)	7–0	Davyd Bichinashvili (UKR)
Moon Eui-jae (KOR)	6–3	Amir Tavakkolian (IRI)
Eduard Alexeenko (BLR)		Bye
Repechage
Kenji Koshiba (JPN)	11–1	Marcin Jurecki (POL)
Lazaros Loizidis (GRE)	2–4	Nurbek Izabekov (KGZ)
Kamil Kocaoğlu (TUR)	6–3	Valerij Verhušin (MKD)
Wu Guang (CHN)	3–14	Leonardo Díaz (CUB)
Jannie du Toit (RSA)	0–3 Fall	Ruslan Khinchagov (UZB)
Árpád Ritter (HUN)	0–6	Miroslav Gochev (BUL)
Dan St. John (USA)	1–6	Aleksandre Kakhniashvili (GEO)
Küllo Kõiv (EST)		Bye

=== Round 4 ===
	Score	
Repechage
Küllo Kõiv (EST)	4–1	Kenji Koshiba (JPN)
Nurbek Izabekov (KGZ)	2–5	Kamil Kocaoğlu (TUR)
Leonardo Díaz (CUB)	4–7	Ruslan Khinchagov (UZB)
Miroslav Gochev (BUL)	3–0	Aleksandre Kakhniashvili (GEO)
Tümen-Ölziin Mönkhbayar (MGL)	0–7	Davyd Bichinashvili (UKR)
Amir Tavakkolian (IRI)		Bye

=== Round 5 ===
	Score	
Semifinals
Eduard Alexeenko (BLR)	1–4	Alexander Leipold (GER)
Buvaisar Saitiev (RUS)	6–2	Moon Eui-jae (KOR)
Repechage
Amir Tavakkolian (IRI)	0–5	Küllo Kõiv (EST)
Kamil Kocaoğlu (TUR)	3–0 Fall	Davyd Bichinashvili (UKR)
Ruslan Khinchagov (UZB)	1–2	Miroslav Gochev (BUL)

=== Round 6 ===
	Score	
Repechage
Küllo Kõiv (EST)	0–3 Fall	Kamil Kocaoğlu (TUR)
Miroslav Gochev (BUL)		Bye

=== Round 7 ===
	Score	
Repechage
Eduard Alexeenko (BLR)	2–5	Miroslav Gochev (BUL)
Kamil Kocaoğlu (TUR)	3–0	Moon Eui-jae (KOR)

=== Finals ===
	Score	
5th place match
Eduard Alexeenko (BLR)	WO	Moon Eui-jae (KOR)
Bronze medal match
Miroslav Gochev (BUL)	3–0	Kamil Kocaoğlu (TUR)
Final
Alexander Leipold (GER)	1–2	Buvaisar Saitiev (RUS)
