= 1999 World Wrestling Championships – Men's freestyle 76 kg =

Men's freestyle 76 kg at the 1999 World Championships
- Venue: Atatürk Sport Hall
- Dates: 7–9 October 1999
- Competitors: 34 from 34 nations

Medalists
gold medal	Adam Saitiev	Russia
silver medal	Alexander Leipold	Germany
bronze medal	Adem Bereket	Turkey

The men's freestyle 76 kilograms is a competition featured at the 1999 World Wrestling Championships, and was held at the Atatürk Sport Hall in Ankara, Turkey from 7 to 9 October 1999.

== Results ==
Legend

- F — Won by fall
- R — Retired

=== Preliminary round ===
==== Pool 1 ====
Pos	Athlete	Pld	W	L	CP	TP	SVK	MDA	BLR
1	Radion Kertanti (SVK)	2	2	0	6	13	—	9–7	4–2
2	Victor Peicov (MDA)	2	1	1	5	12	1–3 PP	—	5–1 Fall
3	Eduard Alexeenko (BLR)	2	0	2	1	3	1–3 PP	0–4 TO	—

Source: Official website

==== Pool 2 ====
Pos	Athlete	Pld	W	L	CP	TP	KOR	AZE	GEO
1	Moon Eui-jae (KOR)	2	2	0	7	19	—	7–4	12–0
2	Elshad Allahverdiyev (AZE)	2	1	1	5	19	1–3 PP	—	15–3 Fall
3	Aleksandre Kakhniashvili (GEO)	2	0	2	0	3	0–4 ST	0–4 TO	—

Source: Official website

==== Pool 3 ====
Pos	Athlete	Pld	W	L	CP	TP	USA	ARM	CHN
1	Joe Williams (USA)	2	2	0	6	16	—	10–5	6–0
2	Habetnak Kurghinyan (ARM)	2	1	1	5	18	1–3 PP	—	13–2 Fall
3	Zhang Wenyan (CHN)	2	0	2	0	2	0–3 PO	0–4 TO	—

Source: Official website

==== Pool 4 ====
Pos	Athlete	Pld	W	L	CP	TP	CUB	TUR	JPN
1	Daniel González (CUB)	2	2	0	6	6	—	3–2	3–1
2	Adem Bereket (TUR)	2	1	1	5	16	1–3 PP	—	14–5 Fall
3	Kenji Koshiba (JPN)	2	0	2	1	6	1–3 PP	0–4 TO	—

Source: Official website

==== Pool 5 ====
Pos	Athlete	Pld	W	L	CP	TP	KAZ	KGZ	GRE
1	Gennadiy Laliyev (KAZ)	2	2	0	6	10	—	3–2	7–4
2	Nurbek Izabekov (KGZ)	2	1	1	4	5	1–3 PP	—	3–0
3	Lazaros Loizidis (GRE)	2	0	2	1	4	1–3 PP	0–3 PO	—

Source: Official website

==== Pool 6 ====
Pos	Athlete	Pld	W	L	CP	TP	UKR	SYR	GBR
1	Alik Muzaiev (UKR)	2	2	0	7	15	—	5–4	10–0
2	Mohammad Al-Khanati (SYR)	2	1	1	4	9	1–3 PP	—	5–3
3	Thomas Coppola (GBR)	2	0	2	1	3	0–4 ST	1–3 PP	—

Source: Official website

==== Pool 7 ====
Pos	Athlete	Pld	W	L	CP	TP	RUS	POL	UZB
1	Adam Saitiev (RUS)	2	2	0	6	16	—	9–0	7–1
2	Radosław Horbik (POL)	2	1	1	3	7	0–3 PO	—	7–4
3	Ruslan Khinchagov (UZB)	2	0	2	2	5	1–3 PP	1–3 PP	—

Source: Official website

==== Pool 8 ====
Pos	Athlete	Pld	W	L	CP	TP	HUN	IRI	AUS
1	Árpád Ritter (HUN)	2	2	0	7	21	—	10–6	11–3 Fall
2	Masoud Jamshidi (IRI)	2	1	1	5	24	1–3 PP	—	18–1
3	Rein Ozoline (AUS)	2	0	2	1	4	0–4 TO	1–4 SP	—

Source: Official website

==== Pool 9 ====
Pos	Athlete	Pld	W	L	CP	TP	GER	ESP	PUR
1	Alexander Leipold (GER)	2	2	0	8	22	—	11–0	11–0
2	Víctor Domínguez (ESP)	2	1	1	3	4	0–4 ST	—	4–1
3	Manuel García (PUR)	2	0	2	1	1	0–4 ST	1–3 PP	—

Source: Official website

==== Pool 10 ====
Pos	Athlete	Pld	W	L	CP	TP	RSA	MGL	CYP
1	Jannie du Toit (RSA)	2	2	0	6	17	—	13–12	4–3
2	Tümen-Ölziin Mönkhbayar (MGL)	2	1	1	5	25	1–3 PP	—	13–1
3	Marinos Koutoupis (CYP)	2	0	2	2	4	1–3 PP	1–4 SP	—

Source: Official website

==== Pool 11 ====
Pos	Athlete	Pld	W	L	CP	TP	BUL	ROM	CAN	FIN
1	Plamen Paskalev (BUL)	3	3	0	11	18	—	7–0	11–0	WO
2	Mihai Stroia (ROM)	3	2	1	7	5	0–3 PO	—	5–2	WO
3	Nick Ugoalah (CAN)	3	1	2	5	13	0–4 ST	1–3 PP	—	11–1 Fall
4	Jari Olmala (FIN)	3	0	3	0	1	0–4 EF	0–4 PA	0–4 TO	—

Source: Official website

=== Knockout round ===
Round of 16
Radion Kertanti (SVK)	2
Moon Eui-jae (KOR)	7
Joe Williams (USA)	1
Daniel González (CUB)	1
Gennadiy Laliyev (KAZ)	1
Alik Muzaiev (UKR)	1
Adam Saitiev (RUS)	11
Árpád Ritter (HUN)	3
Alexander Leipold (GER)	11
Jannie du Toit (RSA)	0
Plamen Paskalev (BUL)	9
Victor Peicov (MDA)	4
Elshad Allahverdiyev (AZE)	11
Habetnak Kurghinyan (ARM)	1
Adem Bereket (TUR)	8^{F}
Mihai Stroia (ROM)	0

Quarterfinals
Moon Eui-jae (KOR)	1^{R}
Joe Williams (USA)	6
Alik Muzaiev (UKR)	0
Adam Saitiev (RUS)	4
Alexander Leipold (GER)	11
Plamen Paskalev (BUL)	0
Elshad Allahverdiyev (AZE)	3
Adem Bereket (TUR)	4

Semifinals
Joe Williams (USA)	0
Adam Saitiev (RUS)	4^{F}
Alexander Leipold (GER)	3
Adem Bereket (TUR)	0

Final
Adam Saitiev (RUS)	6
Alexander Leipold (GER)	3
Bronze medal match
Joe Williams (USA)	2
Adem Bereket (TUR)	5
