= 2000 Summer Olympics medal table =

2000 Summer Olympics medals
- Location: Sydney, Australia

Highlights
- Most gold medals: United States (37)
- Most total medals: United States (93)
- Medalling NOCs: 80

World map showing the medal achievements of each country during the 2000 Summer Olympics Legend: represents countries that won at least one gold medal. represents countries that won at least one silver medal but no gold medals. represents countries that won at least one bronze medal (no gold or silver). represents participating countries that did not win medals. represents entities that did not participate at the 2000 Summer Olympics.

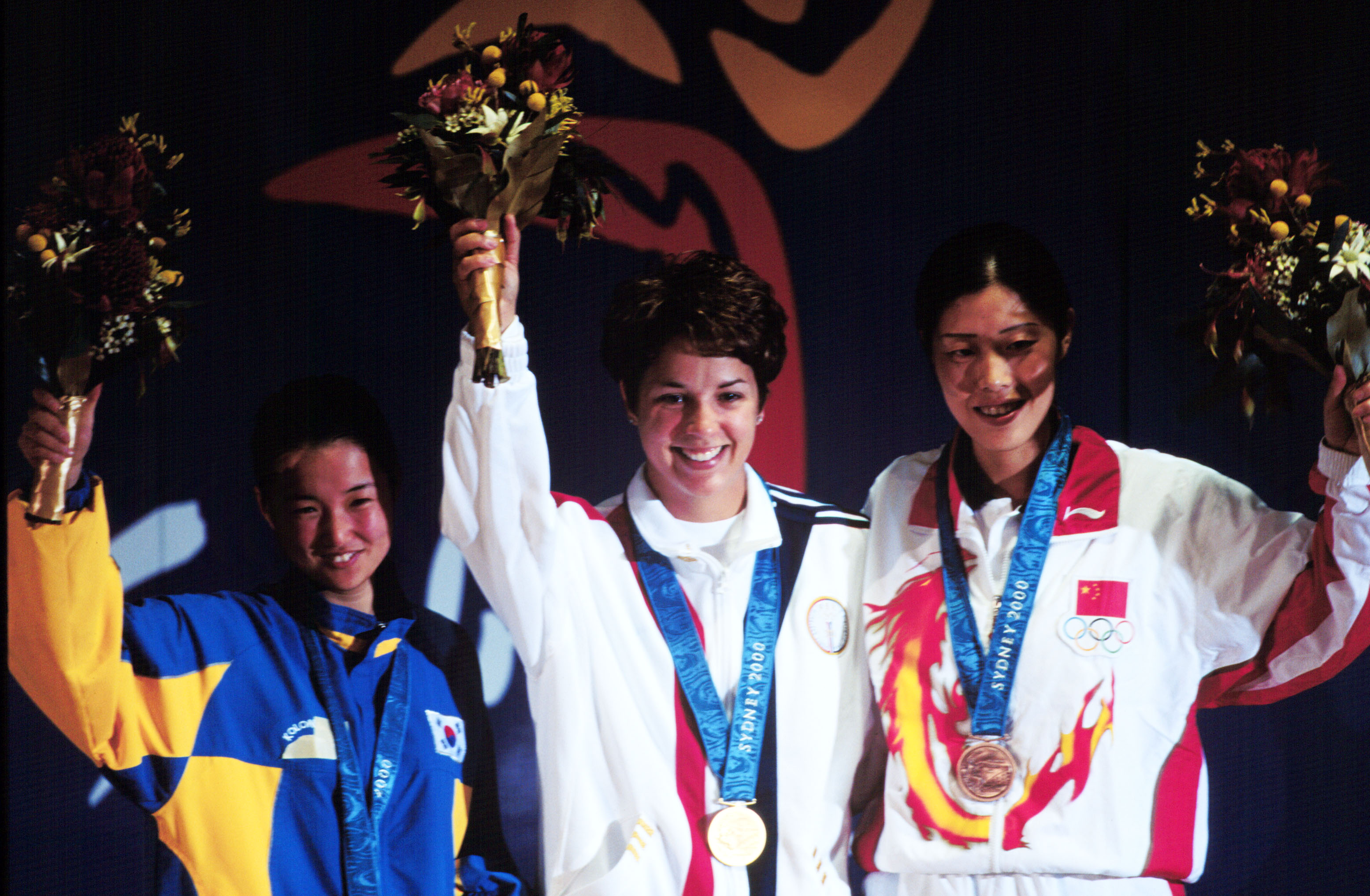
The awarding of the first medals of the Games

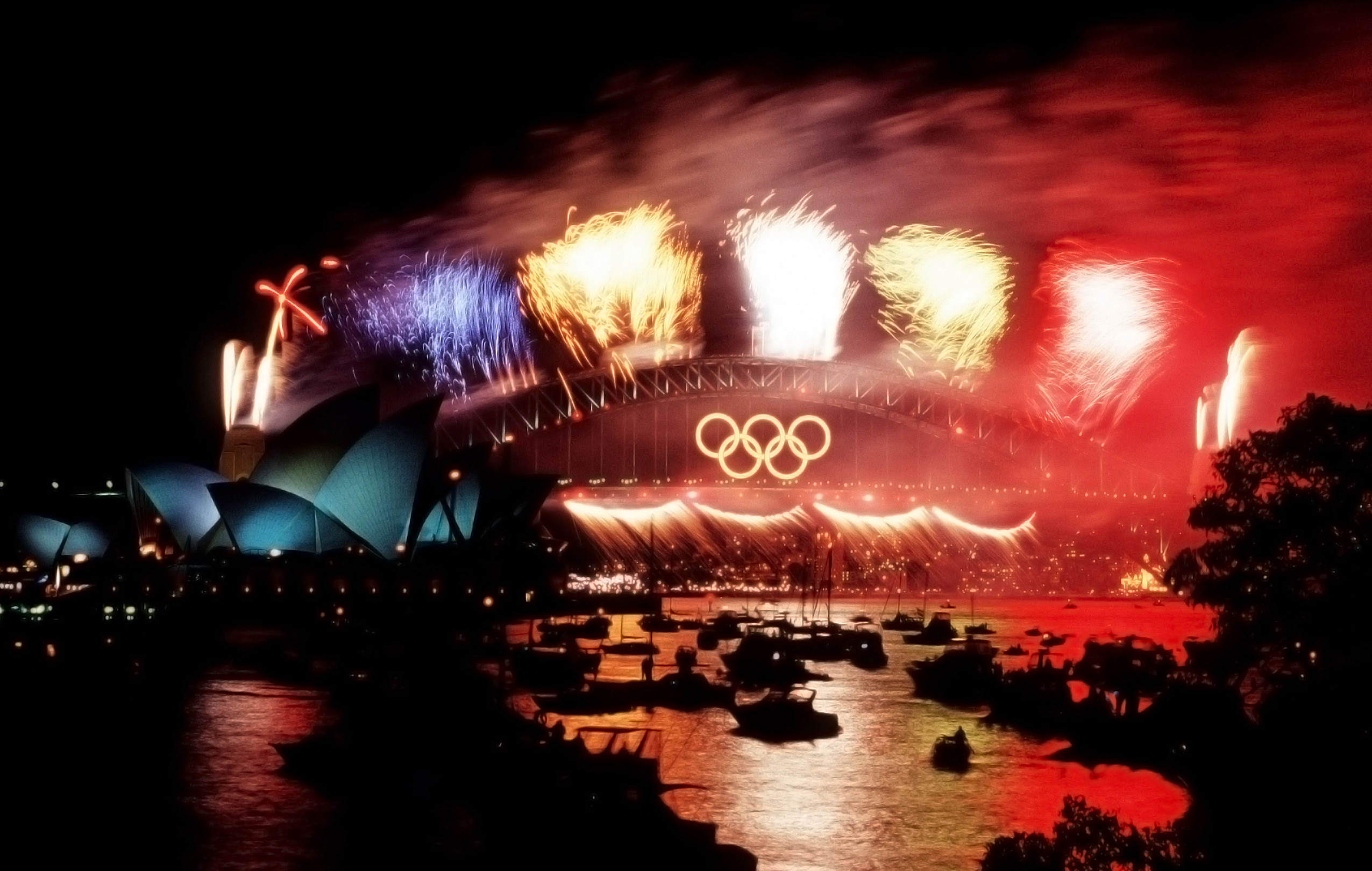
Fireworks over the Sydney Harbour Bridge during the closing ceremonies

The 2000 Summer Olympics, officially known as the Games of the XXVII Olympiad, were a summer multi-sport event held in Sydney, New South Wales, Australia, from 15 September to 1 October 2000. A total of 10,651 athletes from 199 nations represented by National Olympic Committees (NOCs) (with four individual athletes from East Timor because the country had no NOC), including the Olympic debuts of Eritrea, Micronesia and Palau. The games featured 300 events in 28 sports across 39 disciplines, including the debuts of synchronized diving, taekwondo, triathlon, trampolining, women's modern pentathlon and women's weightlifting as official Olympic medal events.

Athletes from 80 countries won at least one medal, a new record, with 52 nations winning at least one gold medal. The United States won the most gold medals, with 37, and the most medals overall, with 93. It was the second consecutive Summer Olympic Games that the United States led the medal count in both gold and overall medals. Host nation Australia finished the Games with 58 medals overall (16 gold, 25 silver, and 17 bronze). Cameroon, Colombia, Latvia, Mozambique and Slovenia won a gold medal for the first time in their Olympic histories, while Vietnam, Barbados, Macedonia, Kuwait, Kyrgyzstan, and Saudi Arabia won their first ever Olympic medals. Among individual athletes, Australia's Ian Thorpe, the Netherlands' Leontien van Moorsel and Inge de Bruijn and the United States' Jenny Thompson and Lenny Krayzelburg won the most gold medals at the games with three each and Russian gymnast Alexei Nemov won the most overall medals with six (two gold, one silver and three bronze).

== Medal table ==
The medal table is based on information provided by the International Olympic Committee (IOC) and is consistent with IOC conventional sorting in its published medal tables. The table uses the Olympic medal table sorting method. By default, the table is ordered by the number of gold medals the athletes from a nation have won, where a nation is an entity represented by a NOC. The number of silver medals is taken into consideration next and then the number of bronze medals. If teams are still tied, equal ranking is given and they are listed alphabetically by their IOC country code.

Events in boxing result in a bronze medal being awarded to each of the two competitors who lose their semi-final matches, as opposed to fighting in a third place tie breaker. Another combat sport, judo, uses a repechage system which also results in two bronze medals being awarded.

There were two ties for medals in athletics. No gold medal and two silver medals were awarded due to second-place ties in the women's 100 metres while a tie for third place in the women's high jump saw two bronze medals being awarded. In swimming events, there were two more ties for medals. There was a two-way tie for first place in the men's 50 metre freestyle, which resulted in two gold medals and no silver medals being awarded. Two bronze medals were awarded in the women's 100 metre freestyle due to a tie for third place.

Key

‡ Changes in medal standings (see below)

* Host nation (Australia)

2000 Summer Olympics medal table (Note: Figures in table reflect all official changes in medal standings.)
Rank	NOC	Gold	Silver	Bronze	Total
1	United States‡	37	24	32	93
2	Russia‡	32	28	29	89
3	China	28	16	14	58
4	Australia*	16	25	17	58
5	Germany‡	13	17	26	56
6	France	13	14	11	38
7	Italy	13	8	13	34
8	Netherlands	12	9	4	25
9	Cuba	11	11	7	29
10	Great Britain	11	10	7	28
11	Romania‡	11	6	9	26
12	South Korea‡	8	10	10	28
13	Hungary	8	6	3	17
14	Poland	6	5	3	14
15	Japan	5	8	5	18
16	Bulgaria	5	6	2	13
17	Greece	4	6	3	13
18	Sweden	4	5	3	12
19	Norway	4	3	3	10
20	Ethiopia	4	1	3	8
21	Ukraine	3	10	10	23
22	Kazakhstan	3	4	0	7
23	Belarus	3	3	11	17
24	Canada	3	3	8	14
25	Spain	3	3	5	11
26	Turkey‡	3	0	2	5
27	Iran	3	0	1	4
28	Czech Republic	2	3	3	8
29	Kenya	2	3	2	7
30	Denmark	2	3	1	6
31	Finland	2	1	1	4
32	Austria	2	1	0	3
33	Lithuania	2	0	3	5
34	Azerbaijan	2	0	1	3
34	Bahamas‡	2	0	1	3
36	Slovenia	2	0	0	2
37	Switzerland	1	6	2	9
38	Indonesia	1	3	2	6
39	Slovakia	1	3	1	5
40	Mexico	1	2	3	6
41	Nigeria‡	1	2	0	3
42	Algeria	1	1	3	5
43	Uzbekistan	1	1	2	4
44	FR Yugoslavia	1	1	1	3
44	Latvia	1	1	1	3
46	New Zealand	1	0	3	4
47	Estonia	1	0	2	3
47	Thailand	1	0	2	3
49	Croatia	1	0	1	2
50	Cameroon	1	0	0	1
50	Colombia	1	0	0	1
50	Mozambique	1	0	0	1
53	Brazil	0	6	6	12
54	Jamaica‡	0	6	3	9
55	Belgium	0	2	3	5
55	South Africa	0	2	3	5
57	Argentina	0	2	2	4
58	Chinese Taipei	0	1	4	5
58	Morocco	0	1	4	5
60	North Korea	0	1	3	4
61	Moldova	0	1	1	2
61	Saudi Arabia	0	1	1	2
61	Trinidad and Tobago	0	1	1	2
64	Ireland	0	1	0	1
64	Sri Lanka‡	0	1	0	1
64	Uruguay	0	1	0	1
64	Vietnam	0	1	0	1
68	Georgia	0	0	6	6
69	Costa Rica	0	0	2	2
69	Portugal	0	0	2	2
71	Armenia	0	0	1	1
71	Barbados	0	0	1	1
71	Chile	0	0	1	1
71	Iceland	0	0	1	1
71	India	0	0	1	1
71	Israel	0	0	1	1
71	Kuwait	0	0	1	1
71	Kyrgyzstan	0	0	1	1
71	Macedonia	0	0	1	1
71	Qatar	0	0	1	1
Totals (80 entries)		300	300	327	927

== Changes in medal standings ==
List of official changes in medal standings
Ruling date	Event	Athlete (NOC)	1st place, gold medalist(s)	2nd place, silver medalist(s)	3rd place, bronze medalist(s)	Net change	Comment
26 September 2000	Gymnastics, Individual all-around	Andreea Răducan (ROU) DSQ	−1			−1	During the Games, Romanian gymnast Andreea Răducan won the gold in women's artistic individual all-around, but she was stripped of her gold medal after she tested positive for a banned substance. As so, her teammates Simona Amânar and Maria Olaru, originally won silver and bronze, upgraded to gold and silver, respectively. While Chinese gymnast Liu Xuan moved up to bronze.
26 September 2000	Gymnastics, Individual all-around	Simona Amânar (ROU)	+1	−1		0	During the Games, Romanian gymnast Andreea Răducan won the gold in women's artistic individual all-around, but she was stripped of her gold medal after she tested positive for a banned substance. As so, her teammates Simona Amânar and Maria Olaru, originally won silver and bronze, upgraded to gold and silver, respectively. While Chinese gymnast Liu Xuan moved up to bronze.
26 September 2000	Gymnastics, Individual all-around	Maria Olaru (ROU)		+1	−1	0	During the Games, Romanian gymnast Andreea Răducan won the gold in women's artistic individual all-around, but she was stripped of her gold medal after she tested positive for a banned substance. As so, her teammates Simona Amânar and Maria Olaru, originally won silver and bronze, upgraded to gold and silver, respectively. While Chinese gymnast Liu Xuan moved up to bronze.
26 September 2000	Gymnastics, Individual all-around	Liu Xuan (CHN)			+1	+1	During the Games, Romanian gymnast Andreea Răducan won the gold in women's artistic individual all-around, but she was stripped of her gold medal after she tested positive for a banned substance. As so, her teammates Simona Amânar and Maria Olaru, originally won silver and bronze, upgraded to gold and silver, respectively. While Chinese gymnast Liu Xuan moved up to bronze.
23 October 2000	Wrestling, Men's freestyle 76 kg	Alexander Leipold (GER) DSQ	−1			−1	Three weeks after the games, Alexander Leipold of Germany was stripped of his gold medal after he tested positive for nandrolone, with the medal being reallocated to his American rival, originally second-placed Brandon Slay.
23 October 2000	Wrestling, Men's freestyle 76 kg	Brandon Slay (USA)	+1	−1		0	Three weeks after the games, Alexander Leipold of Germany was stripped of his gold medal after he tested positive for nandrolone, with the medal being reallocated to his American rival, originally second-placed Brandon Slay.
23 October 2000	Wrestling, Men's freestyle 76 kg	Moon Eui-jae (KOR)		+1	−1	0	Three weeks after the games, Alexander Leipold of Germany was stripped of his gold medal after he tested positive for nandrolone, with the medal being reallocated to his American rival, originally second-placed Brandon Slay.
23 October 2000	Wrestling, Men's freestyle 76 kg	Adem Bereket (TUR)			+1	+1	Three weeks after the games, Alexander Leipold of Germany was stripped of his gold medal after he tested positive for nandrolone, with the medal being reallocated to his American rival, originally second-placed Brandon Slay.
5 October 2007	Athletics, Women's 100 metres	Marion Jones (USA) DSQ	−1			−1	American Marion Jones was stripped of her three gold and two bronze medals by the International Olympic Committee (IOC), after confessing that she had taken the anabolic steroid tetrahydrogestrinone before competing in Sydney. The women's 100 metres gold medal has not been reallocated, because the presumed recipient, Ekaterini Thanou of Greece, was given a two-year ban for doping just before the 2004 Summer Olympics. After years of deliberations the IOC decided to upgrade third- and fourth-placed athletes to silver and bronze, while not upgrading Thanou. Jones' teammates on the relay teams had their medals reinstated due to the fact that, according to the rules at the time, a team should not be stripped of a medal because of a doping offense by one athlete.
5 October 2007	Athletics, Women's 100 metres	Tayna Lawrence (JAM)		+1	−1	0	
5 October 2007	Athletics, Women's 100 metres	Merlene Ottey (JAM)			+1	+1	
5 October 2007	Athletics, Women's 200 metres	Marion Jones (USA) DSQ	−1			−1	
5 October 2007	Athletics, Women's 200 metres	Davis-Thompson (BAH)	+1	−1		0	
5 October 2007	Athletics, Women's 200 metres	Susanthika Jayasinghe (SRI)		+1	−1	0	
5 October 2007	Athletics, Women's 200 metres	Beverly McDonald (JAM)			+1	+1	
5 October 2007	Athletics, Women's long jump	Marion Jones (USA) DSQ			−1	−1	
5 October 2007	Athletics, Women's long jump	Tatyana Kotova (RUS)			+1	+1	
5 October 2007	Athletics, Women's 4 × 100 metres relay	Marion Jones (USA) DSQ			0	0	
5 October 2007	Athletics, Women's 4 × 400 metres relay	Marion Jones (USA) DSQ	0			0	
2 August 2008	Athletics, Men's 4 × 400 metres relay	Antonio Pettigrew (USA) DSQ	−1			−1	On 2 August 2008, the IOC stripped the gold medal from the U.S. men's 4 x 400-metre relay team after Antonio Pettigrew admitted to taking EPO. The IOC reallocated the gold, silver and bronze medals to the teams from Nigeria, Jamaica and the Bahamas, respectively.
2 August 2008	Athletics, Men's 4 × 400 metres relay	(NGR)	+1	−1		0	On 2 August 2008, the IOC stripped the gold medal from the U.S. men's 4 x 400-metre relay team after Antonio Pettigrew admitted to taking EPO. The IOC reallocated the gold, silver and bronze medals to the teams from Nigeria, Jamaica and the Bahamas, respectively.
2 August 2008	Athletics, Men's 4 × 400 metres relay	(JAM)		+1	−1	0	On 2 August 2008, the IOC stripped the gold medal from the U.S. men's 4 x 400-metre relay team after Antonio Pettigrew admitted to taking EPO. The IOC reallocated the gold, silver and bronze medals to the teams from Nigeria, Jamaica and the Bahamas, respectively.
2 August 2008	Athletics, Men's 4 × 400 metres relay	(BAH)			+1	+1	On 2 August 2008, the IOC stripped the gold medal from the U.S. men's 4 x 400-metre relay team after Antonio Pettigrew admitted to taking EPO. The IOC reallocated the gold, silver and bronze medals to the teams from Nigeria, Jamaica and the Bahamas, respectively.
25 February 2010	Gymnastics, Women's artistic team all-around	Dong Fangxiao (CHN) DSQ			−1	−1	On 25 February 2010, the Associated Press reported that one of the members of the Chinese Gymnastic team was found to be under the minimum age limit set for competition. The governing body of the event, the International Gymnastics Federation (FIG), reported that it determined Dong Fangxiao to be 14 during the 2000 Olympics. The minimum age for competition was 16. The FIG invalidated the results of the competition in relation to the disqualified athlete. On 28 April 2010, the International Olympic Committee formally stripped the Chinese team of its bronze medal in the team event. The United States, which originally placed fourth, was awarded the bronze.
25 February 2010	Gymnastics, Women's artistic team all-around	(USA)			+1	+1	
17 January 2013	Cycling, Men's road time trial	Lance Armstrong (USA) DSQ			−1	−1	On 17 January 2013, American cyclist Lance Armstrong was stripped of his bronze medal from the 2000 Summer Olympics by the IOC after his confession of being involved in using doping. The IOC also decided not to award Spanish cyclist Abraham Olano the bronze medal, as he had also tested positive for doping, back in 1998.

List of official changes by country
NOC	Gold	Silver	Bronze	Net change
United States	−2	−1	0	−3
Germany	−1	0	0	−1
Romania	0	0	−1	−1
Nigeria	+1	−1	0	0
South Korea	0	+1	−1	0
Sri Lanka	0	+1	−1	0
Bahamas	+1	−1	+1	+1
Russia	0	0	+1	+1
Turkey	0	0	+1	+1
Jamaica	0	+2	0	+2

== See also ==
- All-time Olympic Games medal table
- 2000 Summer Paralympics medal table
