= Wrestling at the 2000 Summer Olympics – Men's freestyle 76 kg =

Men's freestyle 76 kg at the Games of the XXVII Olympiad
- Venue: Sydney Convention and Exhibition Centre
- Date: 28–30 September 2000
- Competitors: 20 from 20 nations

Medalists
1st place, gold medalist(s)		Brandon Slay	United States
2nd place, silver medalist(s)		Moon Eui-jae	South Korea
3rd place, bronze medalist(s)		Adem Bereket	Turkey

The men's freestyle 76 kilograms at the 2000 Summer Olympics as part of the wrestling program was held at the Sydney Convention and Exhibition Centre from September 28 to 30. The competition held with an elimination system of three or four wrestlers in each pool, with the winners qualify for the quarterfinals, semifinals and final by way of direct elimination.

== Schedule ==
All times are Australian Eastern Daylight Time (UTC+11:00)

Date	Time	Event
28 September 2000	09:30	Round 1
28 September 2000	17:00	Round 2
28 September 2000	17:00	Round 3
29 September 2000	09:30	Quarterfinals
29 September 2000	17:00	Semifinals
30 September 2000	17:00	Finals

== Results ==
Legend

- F — Won by fall
- WO — Won by walkover

=== Elimination pools ===
==== Pool 1 ====
Pos	Athlete	Pld	W	L	CP	TP	Qualification
1	Brandon Slay (USA)	2	2	0	6	8	Knockout round
2	Buvaisar Saitiev (RUS)	2	1	1	4	11	
3	Plamen Paskalev (BUL)	2	0	2	2	3	

Source: Official Report

	Score		CP
Plamen Paskalev (BUL)	2–8	Buvaisar Saitiev (RUS)	1–3 PP
Brandon Slay (USA)	4–1	Plamen Paskalev (BUL)	3–1 PP
Buvaisar Saitiev (RUS)	3–4	Brandon Slay (USA)	1–3 PP

==== Pool 2 ====
Pos	Athlete	Pld	W	L	CP	TP	Qualification
1	Gennadiy Laliyev (KAZ)	2	2	0	6	7	Knockout round
2	Pejman Dorostkar (IRI)	2	1	1	4	4	
3	Tümen-Ölziin Mönkhbayar (MGL)	2	0	2	0	0	

Source: Official Report

	Score		CP
Tümen-Ölziin Mönkhbayar (MGL)	0–4	Gennadiy Laliyev (KAZ)	0–3 PO
Pejman Dorostkar (IRI)	3–0	Tümen-Ölziin Mönkhbayar (MGL)	3–0 PO
Gennadiy Laliyev (KAZ)	3–1	Pejman Dorostkar (IRI)	3–1 PP

==== Pool 3 ====
Pos	Athlete	Pld	W	L	CP	TP	Qualification
1	Ruslan Khinchagov (UZB)	2	2	0	7	14	Knockout round
2	Elshad Allahverdiyev (AZE)	2	1	1	4	10	
3	Jannie du Toit (RSA)	2	0	2	2	6	

Source: Official Report

	Score		CP
Ruslan Khinchagov (UZB)	11–1	Jannie du Toit (RSA)	4–1 SP
Elshad Allahverdiyev (AZE)	2–3	Ruslan Khinchagov (UZB)	1–3 PP
Jannie du Toit (RSA)	5–8	Elshad Allahverdiyev (AZE)	1–3 PP

==== Pool 4 ====
Pos	Athlete	Pld	W	L	CP	TP	Qualification
1	Adem Bereket (TUR)	2	2	0	6	6	Knockout round
2	Guram Mchedlidze (GEO)	2	1	1	3	3	
3	Árpád Ritter (HUN)	2	0	2	1	2	

Source: Official Report

	Score		CP
Guram Mchedlidze (GEO)	3–0	Árpád Ritter (HUN)	3–0 PO
Adem Bereket (TUR)	3–0	Guram Mchedlidze (GEO)	3–0 PO
Árpád Ritter (HUN)	2–3	Adem Bereket (TUR)	1–3 PP

==== Pool 5 ====
Pos	Athlete	Pld	W	L	CP	TP	Qualification
1	Moon Eui-jae (KOR)	3	3	0	10	21	Knockout round
2	Alik Muzaiev (UKR)	3	2	1	8	20	
3	Marcin Jurecki (POL)	3	1	2	6	12	
4	Rein Ozoline (AUS)	3	0	3	1	3	

Source: Official Report

	Score		CP
Marcin Jurecki (POL)	10–0	Rein Ozoline (AUS)	4–0 ST
Alik Muzaiev (UKR)	1–5	Moon Eui-jae (KOR)	1–3 PP
Marcin Jurecki (POL)	1–3	Alik Muzaiev (UKR)	1–3 PP
Rein Ozoline (AUS)	0–11	Moon Eui-jae (KOR)	0–4 ST
Marcin Jurecki (POL)	1–5	Moon Eui-jae (KOR)	1–3 PP
Rein Ozoline (AUS)	3–16	Alik Muzaiev (UKR)	1–4 SP

==== Pool 6 ====
Pos	Athlete	Pld	W	L	CP	TP	Qualification
1	Alexander Leipold (GER)	3	3	0	9	14	Knockout round
2	Nasir Gadzhikhanov (MKD)	3	2	1	7	8	
3	Yosmany Romero (CUB)	3	1	2	4	4	
4	Radion Kertanti (SVK)	3	0	3	2	4	

Source: Official Report

	Score		CP
Alexander Leipold (GER)	4–1	Yosmany Romero (CUB)	3–1 PP
Radion Kertanti (SVK)	2–3	Nasir Gadzhikhanov (MKD)	1–3 PP
Alexander Leipold (GER)	5–0	Radion Kertanti (SVK)	3–0 PO
Yosmany Romero (CUB)	0–3	Nasir Gadzhikhanov (MKD)	0–3 PO
Alexander Leipold (GER)	5–2	Nasir Gadzhikhanov (MKD)	3–1 PP
Yosmany Romero (CUB)	3–2	Radion Kertanti (SVK)	3–1 PP

=== Knockout round ===
Quarterfinals
Brandon Slay (USA)	2
Gennadiy Laliyev (KAZ)	2
Ruslan Khinchagov (UZB)	2
Adem Bereket (TUR)	5

Semifinals
Brandon Slay (USA)	3
Adem Bereket (TUR)	1
Moon Eui-jae (KOR)	1
Alexander Leipold (GER)	3

Gold medal match
Brandon Slay (USA)	0
Alexander Leipold (GER)	4
Bronze medal match
Adem Bereket (TUR)	0
Moon Eui-jae (KOR)	3^{F}

Classification 5th–6th
Gennadiy Laliyev (KAZ)	WO
Ruslan Khinchagov (UZB)

== Final standing ==
Rank	Athlete
1st place, gold medalist(s)	Brandon Slay (USA)
2nd place, silver medalist(s)	Moon Eui-jae (KOR)
3rd place, bronze medalist(s)	Adem Bereket (TUR)
4	Gennadiy Laliyev (KAZ)
5	Ruslan Khinchagov (UZB)
6	Alik Muzaiev (UKR)
7	Nasir Gadzhikhanov (MKD)
8	Marcin Jurecki (POL)
9	Buvaisar Saitiev (RUS)
10	Elshad Allahverdiyev (AZE)
11	Yosmany Romero (CUB)
12	Pejman Dorostkar (IRI)
13	Guram Mchedlidze (GEO)
14	Jannie du Toit (RSA)
15	Radion Kertanti (SVK)
16	Plamen Paskalev (BUL)
17	Rein Ozoline (AUS)
18	Árpád Ritter (HUN)
19	Tümen-Ölziin Mönkhbayar (MGL)
DQ	Alexander Leipold (GER)

- Alexander Leipold of Germany originally won the gold medal, but he was disqualified after he tested positive for Nandrolone.
