= Turkey at the 2000 Summer Olympics =

- IOC code: TUR
- NOC: Turkish National Olympic Committee
- Website: olimpiyat.org.tr (in English and Turkish)

in Sydney
- Flag bearer: Hamza Yerlikaya
- Medals Ranked 26th: Gold 3 Silver 0 Bronze 2 Total 5

Summer Olympics appearances (overview)
- 1908; 1912; 1920; 1924; 1928; 1932; 1936; 1948; 1952; 1956; 1960; 1964; 1968; 1972; 1976; 1980; 1984; 1988; 1992; 1996; 2000; 2004; 2008; 2012; 2016; 2020; 2024; 2028

Other related appearances
- 1906 Intercalated Games

Turkey competed at the 2000 Summer Olympics in Sydney, Australia.

== Medalists ==
Medal	Name	Sport	Event
Gold	Hüseyin Özkan	Judo	Men's Half Lightweight (66 kg)
Gold	Halil Mutlu	Weightlifting	Men's Flyweight (56 kg)
Gold	Hamza Yerlikaya	Wrestling	Men's Greco-Roman Middleweight (85 kg)
Bronze	Hamide Bıkçın Tosun	Taekwondo	Women's (57 kg)
Bronze	Adem Bereket	Wrestling	Men's Freestyle Welterweight (76 kg)

== Results by event ==
=== Archery ===
In its fifth Olympic archery competition, Turkey again came within one victory of a medal. The women's team again made it to the semifinal before losing there. In the bronze medal match, they were defeated by Germany to eliminate them from medal contention.

Men's individual
	Hasan Orbay			Serdar Şatır			Özdemir Akbal		
1/32 eliminations	Defeated	Juan Carlos Manjarrez Godinez; Mexico	165-153	Lost to	Sebastien Flute; France	160-156	Lost to	Scott Hunter-Russell; Australia	154-146
1/16 eliminations	Lost to	Yong-Ho Jang; Korea	169-160	-	-	-	-	-	-

Women's individual
	Elif Altınkaynak			Zekiye Keskin Şatır			Natalia Nasaridze		
1/32 eliminations	Defeated	Jennifer Chan; Philippines	160-143	Lost to	Nataliya Burdeyna; Ukraine	166-157	Lost to	Kirstin Lewis; South Africa	154-153
1/16 eliminations	Lost to	Alison Williamson; Great Britain	157-154	-	-	-	-	-	-

Women's Team Competition:

- Altankaynak, Keskin Şatır, Nasaridze – bronze medal match, 4th place (2-2)

Men's Team Competition:

- Orbay, Satir, and Akbal – quarterfinal, 5th place (1-1)

=== Athletics ===
==== Men's competition ====
Men's Long Jump

- Mesut Yavaş

- Qualifying – 7.35 m (did not advance)

Men's Pole Vault

- Ruhan Işım

- Qualifying – DNS

==== Women's competition ====
Women's 1,500m

- Süreyya Ayhan

- Round 1 – 04:08.37
- Semifinal – 04:09.42 (did not advance)

Women's 5,000m

- Ebru Kavaklıoğlu

- Round 1 – 15:49.15 (did not advance)

Women's Discus

- Oksana Mert

- Qualifying – 55.02 m (did not advance)

Women's Marathon

- Serap Aktaş

- Final – 2:42:40 (37th place)

== Boxing ==
Athlete	Event	Round of 32	Round of 16	Quarterfinal	Semifinal	Final	
Athlete	Event	Opposition Result	Opposition Result	Opposition Result	Opposition Result	Opposition Result	Rank
Ramazan Ballıoğlu	Light flyweight	Velicu (ROU); L 8–20	Did not advance				
Halil İbrahim Turan	Flyweight	Mesbahi (MAR); L 11–17	Did not advance				
Agasi Agaguloglu	Bantamweight	Kangde (CHN); W 17–4	Cermeño (COL); W 11–3	Rigondeaux (CUB); L 5–14	Did not advance		
Ramazan Palyani	Featherweight	Ali (PAK); W 5–4	Pereira (BRA); W (RSC)	Sattarkhanov (KAZ); L 11–12	Did not advance		
Selim Palyani	Lightweight	Jebahi (FRA); W 14–5	Jackson (USA); W (WO)	Maletin (RUS); L (RSC)	Did not advance		
Nurhan Süleymanoğlu	Light welterweight	Strange (CAN); W 9–3	Bykovsky (BLR); L 8–8	Did not advance			
Bülent Ulusoy	Welterweight	Jin-seok (KOR); W 8–6	Craig (USA); W 9–4	Grușac (MDA); L 10–19	Did not advance		
Fırat Karagöllü	Light middleweight	Roche (IRL); W 17–4	Esther (FRA); L 16–18	Did not advance			
Akın Kuloğlu	Middleweight	Carrera (ARG); W (RSC)	Jeong-bin (KOR); W (RET)	Alakbarov (AZE); L 8–18	Did not advance		

Legend: RSC – Referee stopped contest

=== Sailing ===
Men's Mistral

- Ertuğrul İçingir

- Race 1 – 26
- Race 2 – (37) OCS
- Race 3 – 24
- Race 4 – 11
- Race 5 – 15
- Race 6 – 28
- Race 7 – 29
- Race 8 – 25
- Race 9 – (37) OCS
- Race 10 – 22
- Race 11 – 37 DSQ
- Final – 217 (31st place)

Men's Single Handed Dinghy (Finn)

- Ali Enver Adakan

- Race 1 – 5
- Race 2 – 7
- Race 3 – (17)
- Race 4 – 7
- Race 5 – 9
- Race 6 – (23)
- Race 7 – 11
- Race 8 – 3
- Race 9 – 4
- Race 10 – 7
- Race 11 – 13
- Final – 66 (8th place)

Women's Mistral

- İlknur Akdoğan

- Race 1 – (30) DNF
- Race 2 – 27
- Race 3 – (28)
- Race 4 – 28
- Race 5 – 26
- Race 6 – 25
- Race 7 – 28
- Race 8 – 28
- Race 9 – 27
- Race 10 – 28
- Race 11 – 24
- Final – 241 (28th place)

Open Laser

- Ali Kemal Tüfekçi

- Race 2 – (40)
- Race 3 – 33
- Race 4 – (37)
- Race 5 – 29
- Race 6 – 28
- Race 7 – 36
- Race 8 – 30
- Race 9 – 14
- Race 10 – 24
- Race 11 – 27
- Final – 254 (34th place)

=== Swimming ===
Men's 200 m Freestyle

- Aytekin Mindan

- Preliminary Heat – 1:54.86 (did not advance)

Men's 400 m Freestyle

- Aytekin Mindan

- Preliminary Heat – 04:01.46 (did not advance)

Men's 100 m Breaststroke

- Hakan Kiper

- Preliminary Heat – 01:07.46 (did not advance)

Men's 100 m Backstroke

- Derya Büyükuncu

- Preliminary Heat – 56.21 (did not advance)

Men's 200 m Individual Medley

- Orel Oral

- Preliminary Heat – 02:09.51 (did not advance)

Women's 100 m Butterfly

- Ayse Diker

- Preliminary Heat – 01:04.65 (did not advance)

Women's 100 m Breaststroke

- İlkay Dikmen

- Preliminary Heat – 01:11.51 (did not advance)

Women's 200 m Breaststroke

- İlkay Dikmen

- Preliminary Heat – 02:33.34 (did not advance)

Women's 100 m Backstroke

- Derya Erke

- Preliminary Heat – 01:07.26 (did not advance)

Women's 200 m Backstroke

- Derya Erke

- Preliminary Heat – 02:21.28 (did not advance)

=== Weightlifting ===
Men

Athlete	Event	Snatch			Clean & Jerk			Total	Rank
Athlete	Event	1	2	3	1	2	3	Total	Rank
Halil Mutlu	56 kg	130.0	135.0	138.0	160.0	167.5	~~170.0~~	305.5	1st place, gold medalist(s)
Naim Süleymanoğlu	62 kg	~~145.0~~	~~145.0~~	~~145.0~~	–	–	–	DNF	–
Yasin Arslan	69 kg	130.0	135.0	~~137.5~~	160.0	165.0	~~170.0~~	300.0	14
Mehmet Yılmaz	77 kg	~~155.0~~	155.0	160.0	180.0	187.5	~~192.5~~	347.5	10
Ayhan Çiçek	77 kg	140.0	145.0	~~150.0~~	175.0	180.0	~~185.0~~	325.0	13
Bünyamin Sudaş	94 kg	~~175.0~~	~~175.0~~	177.5	215.0	~~220.0~~	~~220.0~~	392.5	7
Abdulaziz Alpak	105 kg	165.0	175.0	~~180.0~~	~~210.0~~	~~210.0~~	~~210.0~~	DNF	–

== Wrestling ==
Freestyle

Athlete	Event	Elimination pool				Quarterfinal	Semifinal	Final / BM	
Athlete	Event	Opposition Result	Opposition Result	Opposition Result	Rank	Opposition Result	Opposition Result	Opposition Result	Rank
Harun Doğan	58 kg	Cuciuc (MDA); L 2–6	Zakhartdinov (UZB); L 0–3	Ramazanov (RUS); L WO	4	did not advance			15
Yüksel Şanlı	69 kg	Oziti (NGR); W 6–0	McIlravy (USA); L 3–6	—N/a	2	did not advance			9
Adem Bereket	76 kg	Mchedlidze (GEO); W 3–0	Ritter (HUN); W 3–2	—N/a	1 Q	Khinchagov (UZB); W 5–2	Slay (USA); L 1–3	Eui-jae (KOR); L 0–3^{F}	3rd place, bronze medalist(s)
Ali Özen	85 kg	Khadartsev (UZB); L 0–3	Hyung-mo (KOR); L 2–5	—N/a	3	did not advance			18
Ahmet Doğu	97 kg	Heidari (IRI); L 1–6	Scherrer (SUI); L 3–4	—N/a	3	did not advance			16
Aydın Polatçı	130 kg	Gombos (HUN); W 3–0	Taymazov (UZB); L 0–3	—N/a	2	did not advance			11

Greco-Roman

Athlete	Event	Elimination pool				Quarterfinal	Semifinal	Final / BM	
Athlete	Event	Opposition Result	Opposition Result	Opposition Result	Rank	Opposition Result	Opposition Result	Opposition Result	Rank
Ercan Yıldız	54 kg	Rivas (CUB); L 0–10	Pellew (NZL); W 16–0	Eyvazov (AZE); L 0–3	3	did not advance			11
Şeref Eroğlu	63 kg	Samurgashev (RUS); L 2–5	Zawadzki (POL); W WO	—N/a	2	did not advance			10
Nazmi Avluca	76 kg	Bichinashvili (AZE); W 3–0	Jin-soo (KOR); L 1–3	—N/a	2	did not advance			13
Hamza Yerlikaya	85 kg	Asell (FIN); W 3–0	Zander (GER); W 5–1	—N/a	1 Q	Méndez (CUB); W 3–0	Vakhtangadze (GEO); W 3–0	Bárdosi (HUN); W 3–3	1st place, gold medalist(s)
Hakkı Başar	97 kg	Chkhaidze (GEO); L 2–4	Wroński (POL); L 1–7	—N/a	3	did not advance			16
Fatih Bakır	130 kg	Evseichik (ISR); L 0–3	Sitnik (POL); W 1–0	Vála (CZE); W 3–0	2	did not advance			8

== Sources ==
- Wallechinsky, David (2004). The Complete Book of the Summer Olympics (Athens 2004 Edition). Toronto, Canada. ISBN 1-894963-32-6.
- International Olympic Committee (2001). The Results. Retrieved 12 November 2005.
- Sydney Organising Committee for the Olympic Games (2001). Official Report of the XXVII Olympiad Volume 1: Preparing for the Games. Retrieved 20 November 2005.
- Sydney Organising Committee for the Olympic Games (2001). Official Report of the XXVII Olympiad Volume 2: Celebrating the Games. Retrieved 20 November 2005.
- Sydney Organising Committee for the Olympic Games (2001). The Results. Retrieved 20 November 2005.
- International Olympic Committee Web Site
