= Macedonia at the 2000 Summer Olympics =

- Flag of the Republic of Macedonia
- IOC code: MKD
- NOC: Olympic Committee of North Macedonia
- Website: www.mok.org.mk (in Macedonian)

in Sydney
- Competitors: 10 (6 men, 4 women) in 5 sports
- Flag bearer: Lazar Popovski
- Medals Ranked 71st: Gold 0 Silver 0 Bronze 1 Total 1

Summer Olympics appearances (overview)
- 1996; 2000; 2004; 2008; 2012; 2016; 2020; 2024

Other related appearances
- Yugoslavia (1920–1988); Independent Olympic Participants (1992)

The Republic of Macedonia competed at the 2000 Summer Olympics in Sydney, Australia, officially under the name of Former Yugoslav Republic of Macedonia.

Macedonia won its first ever Olympic medal on the final day of competition. Magomed Ibragimov won a bronze medal in wrestling. It was Macedonia's only medal of the 2000 Olympics.

The at-the-time president of Macedonia, Boris Trajkovski, was in Sydney during the Olympic Games and attended the Opening Ceremony.

== Medalists ==
Medal	Name	Sport	Event	Date
Bronze	Mogamed Ibragimov	Wrestling	Men's freestyle 85 kg	1 October

== Athletics ==
Men
Track

Athlete	Event	Heat		Semifinal		Final	
Athlete	Event	Result	Rank	Result	Rank	Result	Rank
Vančo Stojanov	800 m	1:47.71	5	did not advance			

Women
Track

Athlete	Event	Heat		Semifinal		Final	
Athlete	Event	Result	Rank	Result	Rank	Result	Rank
Daniela Kuleska	1500 m	4:33.50	13	did not advance			

== Canoeing ==
Athlete	Event	First round		Semifinals		Final	
Athlete	Event	Time	Rank	Time	Rank	Time	Rank
Lazar Popovski	Men's slalom K–1 500 m	2:66.60	17 Q	did not advance			

== Shooting ==
Athlete	Event	Qualification		Final	
Athlete	Event	Score	Position	Score	Position
Divna Pešić	Women's 50 m rifle three positions	561	36	did not advance	
Divna Pešić	Women's 10 m air rifle	384	44	did not advance	

== Swimming ==
Men

Athlete	Event	Heat		Semifinals		Final	
Athlete	Event	Time	Rank	Time	Rank	Time	Rank
Aleksandar Miladinovski	100 m butterfly	55.62	41	did not advance			
Aleksandar Miladinovski	200 m individual medley	2:07.45	38	did not advance			
Zoran Lazarovski	200 m butterfly	2:01.30	29	did not advance			

Women

Athlete	Event	Heat		Semifinals		Final	
Athlete	Event	Time	Rank	Time	Rank	Time	Rank
Mirjana Boševska	800 m freestyle	8:46.39	18	n/a		did not advance	
Mirjana Boševska	200 m butterfly	2:12.59	20	did not advance			
Mirjana Boševska	400 m individual medley	4:48.08	17	n/a		did not advance	
Vesna Stojanovska	200 m freestyle	2:05.58	29	did not advance			
Vesna Stojanovska	400 m freestyle	4:19.69	31	n/a		did not advance	

== Wrestling ==
Freestyle

Athlete	Event	Pool Matches			Quarterfinals	Semifinals	Final / BM	
Athlete	Event	Opposition Result	Opposition Result	Opposition Result	Opposition Result	Opposition Result	Opposition Result	Rank
Nasir Gadžihanov	−76 kg	Kertanti (SVK); W 3–2	Romero (CUB); W 3–0	Leipold (GER); L 2–5	did not advance			7
Magomed Ibragimov	−85 kg	Bichinashvili (UKR); W 1–1	Kawai (JPN); W 6–5	n/a	Burton (USA); W 4–2	Saitiev (RUS); L 0–3	Khadem (IRI); W 4–1	3rd place, bronze medalist(s)
