= Iran at the 2000 Summer Olympics =

- IOC code: IRI
- NOC: National Olympic Committee of the Islamic Republic of Iran
- Website: www.olympic.ir (in Persian and English)

in Sydney, Australia
- Competitors: 35 in 12 sports
- Flag bearer: Amir Reza Khadem
- Medals Ranked 27th: Gold 3 Silver 0 Bronze 1 Total 4

Summer Olympics appearances (overview)
- 1900; 1904–1936; 1948; 1952; 1956; 1960; 1964; 1968; 1972; 1976; 1980–1984; 1988; 1992; 1996; 2000; 2004; 2008; 2012; 2016; 2020; 2024; 2028

Athletes from Iran competed at the 2000 Summer Olympics in Sydney, Australia.

== Competitors ==
| Sport | Men | Women | Total |
|---|---|---|---|
| Aquatics, Swimming | 1 | | 1 |
| Athletics | 1 | | 1 |
| Boxing | 5 | | 5 |
| Canoeing, Sprint | 1 | | 1 |
| Cycling, Road | 2 | | 2 |
| Equestrian | 1 | | 1 |
| Judo | 3 | | 3 |
| Shooting | | 1 | 1 |
| Table tennis | 1 | | 1 |
| Taekwondo | 2 | | 2 |
| Weightlifting | 6 | | 6 |
| Wrestling | 11 | | 11 |
| Total | 34 | 1 | 35 |

== Medal summary ==
=== Medal table ===
| Sport | Gold | Silver | Bronze | Total |
|---|---|---|---|---|
| Taekwondo | | | 1 | 1 |
| Weightlifting | 2 | | | 2 |
| Wrestling | 1 | | | 1 |
| Total | 3 | 0 | 1 | 4 |

=== Medalists ===
| Medal | Name | Sport | Event |
|---|---|---|---|
| Gold | Hossein Tavakkoli | Weightlifting | Men's 105 kg |
| Gold | Hossein Rezazadeh | Weightlifting | Men's +105 kg |
| Gold | Alireza Dabir | Wrestling | Men's freestyle 58 kg |
| Bronze | Hadi Saei | Taekwondo | Men's 68 kg |

== Results by event ==
=== Aquatics ===
==== Swimming ====
Men

| Athlete | Event | Heats | | Semifinals | | Final | |
| Athlete | Event | Time | Rank | Time | Rank | Time | Rank |
|---|---|---|---|---|---|---|---|
| Hamid Reza Mobarrez | 100 m freestyle | 54.12 | 65 | Did not advance | | | |

=== Athletics ===
Men

| Athlete | Event | Round 1 | | | Semifinal | | | Final | | Rank |
| Athlete | Event | Heat | Time | Rank | Heat | Time | Rank | Time | Rank | Rank |
|---|---|---|---|---|---|---|---|---|---|---|
| Mehdi Jelodarzadeh | 800 m | 6 | 1:47.91 | 6 | Did not advance | | | | | 35 |

=== Boxing ===
Men

| Athlete | Event | Round 1 | Round 2 | Quarterfinal | Semifinal | Final | Rank |
|---|---|---|---|---|---|---|---|
| Mohammad Rahim Rahimi | 51 kg | Tou (BUR); L Walkover | Did not advance | | | | — |
| Bijan Batmani | 57 kg | Juarez (USA); L RSCO | Did not advance | | | | 17 |
| Anoushiravan Nourian | 63.5 kg | Olusegun (NGR); L Walkover | Did not advance | | | | — |
| Babak Moghimi | 67 kg | Husanov (UZB); L 5–15 | Did not advance | | | | 17 |
| Rouhollah Hosseini | 91 kg | | Simmons (CAN); L 6–11 | Did not advance | | | 9 |

=== Canoeing ===
==== Sprint ====
Men

| Athlete | Event | Heat | | | Semifinal | | | Final | | Rank |
| Athlete | Event | Heat | Time | Rank | Heat | Time | Rank | Time | Rank | Rank |
|---|---|---|---|---|---|---|---|---|---|---|
| Nader Eivazi | K1 500 m | 3 | 1:49.306 | 8 | Did not advance | | | | | 29 |
| Nader Eivazi | K1 1000 m | 2 | 3:59.767 | 8 | Did not advance | | | | | 31 |

=== Cycling ===
==== Road ====
Men

| Athlete | Event | Time | Rank |
|---|---|---|---|
| Hossein Askari | Road race | Did not finish | |
| Ahad Kazemi | Road race | Did not finish | |

=== Equestrian ===
Jumping

| Athlete | Horse | Event | Qualifier | | | | | Final round A | | Final round B | | |
| Athlete | Horse | Event | 1st | 2nd | 3rd | Total | Rank | Penalties | Rank | Penalties | Total | Rank |
|---|---|---|---|---|---|---|---|---|---|---|---|---|
| Ali Nilforoushan | Campione | Individual | 18.50 | 12.00 | 20.00 | 50.50 | 56 | Did not advance | | | | |

=== Judo ===
Men

| Athlete | Event | Round of 64 | Round of 32 | Round of 16 | Quarterfinal | Semifinal | Repechage | Final | Rank |
|---|---|---|---|---|---|---|---|---|---|
| Arash Miresmaeili | 66 kg | Bye | Özkan (TUR); L 0001–0110 | Bye | Repechage; Georgiev (BUL); W 1001–0000 | Repechage; Zhang (CHN); W 1001–0001 | Repechage; Nakamura (JPN); W 1000–0000 | 3rd place match Giovinazzo (ITA); L 0010–0010 | 5 |
| Kazem Sarikhani | 81 kg | Bye | Guindo (MLI); W 1001–0011 | Randall (GBR); W 0200–0013 | Delgado (POR); L 0001–1012 | Repechage; Kelly (AUS); W 1100–0101 | Repechage; Budõlin (EST); L 0000–1000 | Did not advance | 7 |
| Mahmoud Miran | +100 kg | Bye | Möller (GER); L 0001–0001 | Did not advance | | | | | 20 |

=== Shooting ===
Women

| Athlete | Event | Qualification | | Final | | |
| Athlete | Event | Score | Rank | Score | Total | Rank |
|---|---|---|---|---|---|---|
| Manijeh Kazemi | 10 m air pistol | 362 | 43 | Did not advance | | |

=== Table tennis ===
Men

| Athlete | Event | Group round | | Round of 32 | Round of 16 | Quarterfinal | Semifinal | Final | Rank |
| Athlete | Event | Groups | Rank | Round of 32 | Round of 16 | Quarterfinal | Semifinal | Final | Rank |
|---|---|---|---|---|---|---|---|---|---|
| Majid Ehteshamzadeh | Singles | Keen (NED); L 0–3; 4–21, 11–21, 5–21 | Group J 3 | Did not advance | | | | | 49 |
| Majid Ehteshamzadeh | Singles | Tsiokas (GRE); L 0–3; 19–21, 13–21, 13–21 | Group J 3 | Did not advance | | | | | 49 |

=== Taekwondo ===
Men

| Athlete | Event | Round of 16 | Quarterfinal | Semifinal | Repechage | Final | Rank |
|---|---|---|---|---|---|---|---|
| Hadi Saei | 68 kg | Hsu (TPE); W 5–2 | Hernando (ARG); W 3–0 | Sin (KOR); L 3–5 | Repechage; Massimino (AUS); W 6–5 | 3rd place match Çalışkan (AUT); W 4–2 | 3rd place, bronze medalist(s) |
| Majid Aflaki | 80 kg | Estrada (MEX); L 3–4 | Did not advance | | | | 11 |

=== Weightlifting ===
Men

| Athlete | Event | Snatch | Clean & Jerk | Total | Rank |
|---|---|---|---|---|---|
| Mehdi Panzvan | 62 kg | 140.0 | 162.5 | 302.5 | 5 |
| Mohammad Hossein Barkhah | 77 kg | No mark | — | — | — |
| Shahin Nassirinia | 85 kg | No mark | — | — | — |
| Kourosh Bagheri | 94 kg | 187.5 | 215.0 | 402.5 | 4 |
| Hossein Tavakkoli | 105 kg | 190.0 | 235.0 | 425.0 | 1st place, gold medalist(s) |
| Hossein Rezazadeh | +105 kg | 212.5 WR | 260.0 | 472.5 WR | 1st place, gold medalist(s) |

=== Wrestling ===
Men's freestyle

| Athlete | Event | Elimination | | Quarterfinal | Semifinal | Final | Rank |
| Athlete | Event | Pools | Rank | Quarterfinal | Semifinal | Final | Rank |
|---|---|---|---|---|---|---|---|
| Behnam Tayyebi | 54 kg | Züünbayan (MGL); W 3–2 | Pool F 3 | Did not advance | | | 13 |
| Behnam Tayyebi | 54 kg | Kardanov (GRE); L 0–7 | Pool F 3 | Did not advance | | | 13 |
| Behnam Tayyebi | 54 kg | Railean (MDA); L 1–2 | Pool F 3 | Did not advance | | | 13 |
| Alireza Dabir | 58 kg | Embalo (GBS); W 10–0 | Pool A 1 Q | Pürevbaatar (MGL); W 5–2 | Brands (USA); W 6–4 | Buslovych (UKR); W 3–0 | 1st place, gold medalist(s) |
| Alireza Dabir | 58 kg | Sissaouri (CAN); W 3–0 | Pool A 1 Q | Pürevbaatar (MGL); W 5–2 | Brands (USA); W 6–4 | Buslovych (UKR); W 3–0 | 1st place, gold medalist(s) |
| Mohammad Talaei | 63 kg | Kolat (USA); W 5–4 | Pool C 1 Q | Hayrapetyan (ARM); W 3–2 | Barzakov (BUL); L 0–4 | 3rd place match Jang (KOR); L 2–12 | 4 |
| Mohammad Talaei | 63 kg | Islamov (UZB); W Walkover | Pool C 1 Q | Hayrapetyan (ARM); W 3–2 | Barzakov (BUL); L 0–4 | 3rd place match Jang (KOR); L 2–12 | 4 |
| Amir Tavakkolian | 69 kg | Bedineishvili (GEO); W 5–4 | Pool A 2 | Did not advance | | | 10 |
| Amir Tavakkolian | 69 kg | Igali (CAN); L 2–2 | Pool A 2 | Did not advance | | | 10 |
| Pejman Dorostkar | 76 kg | Mönkhbayar (MGL); W 3–0 | Pool B 2 | Did not advance | | | 12 |
| Pejman Dorostkar | 76 kg | Laliyev (KAZ); L 1–3 | Pool B 2 | Did not advance | | | 12 |
| Amir Reza Khadem | 85 kg | Ghiță (ROU); W 5–3 | Pool F 1 Q | Bye | Romero (CUB); L 0–3 | 3rd place match Ibragimov (MKD); L 1–4 | 4 |
| Amir Reza Khadem | 85 kg | Aka-Akesse (CIV); W 4–0 | Pool F 1 Q | Bye | Romero (CUB); L 0–3 | 3rd place match Ibragimov (MKD); L 1–4 | 4 |
| Amir Reza Khadem | 85 kg | Kapuvári (HUN); W 5–3 | Pool F 1 Q | Bye | Romero (CUB); L 0–3 | 3rd place match Ibragimov (MKD); L 1–4 | 4 |
| Alireza Heidari | 97 kg | Scherrer (SUI); W 7–1 | Pool B 1 Q | Kurtanidze (GEO); L 0–1 | Did not advance | 5th place match Xanthopoulos (GRE); L Walkover | 6 |
| Alireza Heidari | 97 kg | Doğu (TUR); W 6–1 | Pool B 1 Q | Kurtanidze (GEO); L 0–1 | Did not advance | 5th place match Xanthopoulos (GRE); L Walkover | 6 |
| Abbas Jadidi | 130 kg | Topalidis (GRE); W 9–1 | Pool F 1 Q | Bye | Musulbes (RUS); L 0–3 | 3rd place match Rodríguez (CUB); L 0–1 | 4 |
| Abbas Jadidi | 130 kg | Modebadze (GEO); W 4–0 | Pool F 1 Q | Bye | Musulbes (RUS); L 0–3 | 3rd place match Rodríguez (CUB); L 0–1 | 4 |

Men's Greco-Roman

| Athlete | Event | Elimination | | Quarterfinal | Semifinal | Final | Rank |
| Athlete | Event | Pools | Rank | Quarterfinal | Semifinal | Final | Rank |
|---|---|---|---|---|---|---|---|
| Hassan Rangraz | 54 kg | Švehla (CZE); W 8–2 | Pool C 2 | Did not advance | | | 14 |
| Hassan Rangraz | 54 kg | Wang (CHN); L 2–8 | Pool C 2 | Did not advance | | | 14 |
| Ali Ashkani | 58 kg | Majoros (HUN); W 5–1 | Pool B 1 Q | Kim (KOR); L 1–3 | Did not advance | 5th place match Gruenwald (USA); W 3–2 | 5 |
| Ali Ashkani | 58 kg | Guliashvili (GEO); W 7–0 | Pool B 1 Q | Kim (KOR); L 1–3 | Did not advance | 5th place match Gruenwald (USA); W 3–2 | 5 |
| Parviz Zeidvand | 69 kg | Dugushiev (AZE); L 0–5 | Pool C 3 | Did not advance | | | 16 |
| Parviz Zeidvand | 69 kg | Lappalainen (FIN); L 1–2 | Pool C 3 | Did not advance | | | 16 |
