= Adam Saitiev =

Russian Olympic wrestler (born 1977)

Personal information
- Native name: Адам Хамидович Сайтиев
- Full name: Adam Hamidovich Saitiev
- Nationality: Russia
- Born: December 12, 1977 (age 48) Khasavyurt, Dagestan ASSR, Russian SFSR, Soviet Union
- Height: 1.78 m (5 ft 10 in)

Sport
- Country: Russia
- Sport: Wrestling
- Weight class: 74-85 kg
- Event: Freestyle
- Coached by: Viktor Alexeev, Abdul Saitiev
Medal record
Men's freestyle wrestling
Representing Russia
Olympic Games
Gold medal – first place	2000 Sydney	85 kg
World Championships
Gold medal – first place	Ankara 1999	76 kg
Gold medal – first place	Tehran 2002	84 kg
European Championships
Gold medal – first place	1999 Minsk	76 kg
Gold medal – first place	2000 Budapest	85 kg
Gold medal – first place	2006 Moscow	84 kg
Bronze medal – third place	1998 Bratislava	76 kg

Adam Hamidovich Saitiev, also spelled Saytiev, (Chechen: Адам Хамидович Сайтиев, born December 12, 1977) is a Russian wrestler, who won gold at the 2000 Summer Olympics at 85 kg. Considered to be one of the greatest wrestlers of all time, Adam also won the Wrestling World Championships in 1999 and 2002. His elder brother Buvaisar Saitiev, also a wrestler, was a three-time Olympic champion and six-time World champion.

== Wrestling career ==
Adam started his senior-level international career at 69 kg, or around 152 lbs. He found the weight cut too severe, and soon moved up to 76 kg, where he was world champ in 1999. However, his elder brother Buvaisar also competed in the same weight class, and Adam wanted to compete alongside his brother at the Olympics, not compete against him for a spot on the team. Adam moved up to 85 kg, and despite being undersized, won two world-level titles at the weight.

Saitiev competed many times after 2002, but his career was affected by many injuries.

Saitiev made a comeback in 2012. He found significant success, but in the Russian freestyle wrestling championships 2012 final match lost to Denis Tsargush (1-0; 1-0).

== Awards and honors ==
Saitiev is a recipient of the Order of Honor (2001) and Order of Friendship (2004).

== Match results ==
World Championships & Olympic Games Matches
Res.	Record	Opponent	Score	Date	Event	Location
2002 UWW world (gold) at 84kg
Win	21-3	(Cuba) Yoel Romero	4-3	September 5, 2002	2002 World Wrestling Championships	Tehran, Iran
Win	20-3	(Bulgaria) Arkadii Tzopa	Fall	September 5, 2002	2002 World Wrestling Championships	Tehran, Iran
Win	19-3	(Poland) Marcin Jurecki	7-3	September 5, 2002	2002 World Wrestling Championships	Tehran, Iran
Win	18-3	(India) Aman Deep	Tech. Fall	September 5, 2002	2002 World Wrestling Championships	Tehran, Iran
Win	17-3	(Mongolia) Narantsetseg Burenbaatar	Tech. Fall	September 5, 2002	2002 World Wrestling Championships	Tehran, Iran
2000 Olympic (gold) at 85kg
Win	16-3	(Cuba) Yoel Romero	Fall	September 28, 2000	2000 Summer Olympics	Sydney, Australia
Win	15-3	(North Macedonia) Magomed Ibragimov	3-0	September 28, 2000	2000 Summer Olympics	Sydney, Australia
Win	14-3	(South Korea) Yang Hyung-mo	5-0	September 28, 2000	2000 Summer Olympics	Sydney, Australia
Win	13-3	(Australia) Igor Praporshchikov	Fall	September 28, 2000	2000 Summer Olympics	Sydney, Australia
Win	12-3	(Belarus) Beibulat Musaev	4-1	September 28, 2000	2000 Summer Olympics	Sydney, Australia
1999 UWW world (gold) at 76kg
Win	11-3	(Germany) Alexander Leipold	6-3	October 7, 1999	1999 World Wrestling Championships	Ankara, Turkey
Win	10-3	(United States) Joe Williams	Fall	October 7, 1999	1999 World Wrestling Championships	Ankara, Turkey
Win	9-3	(Ukraine) Alik Muzaiev	4-0	October 7, 1999	1999 World Wrestling Championships	Ankara, Turkey
Win	8-3	(Hungary) Arpad Ritter	11-3	October 7, 1999	1999 World Wrestling Championships	Ankara, Turkey
Win	7-3	(Poland) Radoslaw Horbik	9-0	October 7, 1999	1999 World Wrestling Championships	Ankara, Turkey
Win	6-3	(Uzbekistan) Ruslan Khinchagov	7-1	October 7, 1999	1999 World Wrestling Championships	Ankara, Turkey
1997 UWW world 6th at 69kg
Loss	5-3	(Iran) Davoud Ghanbari	Inj. Def.	August 29, 1997	1997 World Wrestling Championships	Krasnojarsk, Russia
Loss	5-2	(Ukraine) Zaza Zazirov	2-4	August 29, 1997	1997 World Wrestling Championships	Krasnojarsk, Russia
Win	5-1	(Turkey) Yüksel Şanlı	Fall	August 29, 1997	1997 World Wrestling Championships	Krasnojarsk, Russia
Win	4-1	(Kyrgyzstan) Almaz Askarov	Fall	August 29, 1997	1997 World Wrestling Championships	Krasnojarsk, Russia
Win	3-1	(Georgia (country)) David Gagishvili	Fall	August 29, 1997	1997 World Wrestling Championships	Krasnojarsk, Russia
Win	2-1	(Azerbaijan) Elchad Allakhverdiev	4-2	August 29, 1997	1997 World Wrestling Championships	Krasnojarsk, Russia
Loss	1-1	(Uzbekistan) Igor Kupeev	2-5	August 29, 1997	1997 World Wrestling Championships	Krasnojarsk, Russia
Win	1-0	(Venezuela) Juan Carlos Rivero	Tech. Fall	August 29, 1997	1997 World Wrestling Championships	Krasnojarsk, Russia
