= Saitiev =

Saitiev, female Saitieva is a surname of Chechen origin. Notable people with the surname include:

- Adam Saitiev (born 1977), Russian Olympic wrestler
- Buvaisar Saitiev (1975–2025), Russian Olympic freestyle wrestler and politician
