= Mongolia at the 2000 Summer Olympics =

- IOC code: MGL
- NOC: Mongolian National Olympic Committee
- Website: www.olympic.mn (in Mongolian)

in Sydney
- Flag bearer: Badmaanyambuugiin Bat-Erdene
- Medals: Gold 0 Silver 0 Bronze 0 Total 0

Summer Olympics appearances (overview)
- 1964; 1968; 1972; 1976; 1980; 1984; 1988; 1992; 1996; 2000; 2004; 2008; 2012; 2016; 2020; 2024

Mongolia competed at the 2000 Summer Olympics in Sydney, Australia.

== Athletics ==
Key

- Q = Qualified for the next round by position in race or, in field events, by achieving the automatic qualification target
- q = Qualified for the next round as a fastest loser or, in field events, by position without achieving the qualifying target

Track and road events

Athlete	Event	Heat		Quarterfinal		Semifinal		Final	
Athlete	Event	Time	Rank	Time	Rank	Time	Rank	Time	Rank
Puntsag-Ochiryn Pürevsüren	Men's 800 m	1:56.29	56	—N/a		Did not advance			
Baatarkhüügiin Battsetseg	Women's 5000 m	18:22.98	48	—N/a				Did not advance	

== Boxing ==
Athlete	Event	Round of 32	Round of 16	Quarterfinal	Semifinal	Final	
Athlete	Event	Opposition Result	Opposition Result	Opposition Result	Opposition Result	Opposition Result	Rank
Tümentsetsegiin Üitümen	Lightweight	Raimkulov (KGZ); L 4–15	Did not advance				

== Judo ==
Men

Athlete	Event	First round	Round of 32	Round of 16	Quarterfinal	Semifinal	Repechage 1	Repechage 2	Repechage 3	Repechage 4	Final / BM	
Athlete	Event	Opposition Result	Opposition Result	Opposition Result	Opposition Result	Opposition Result	Opposition Result	Opposition Result	Opposition Result	Opposition Result	Opposition Result	Rank
Dorjpalamyn Narmandakh	–60 kg	Bye	Alvarenga (VEN); W 0100–0011	Jung (KOR); L 0001–1020	Did not advance		—N/a	Khergiani (GEO); L 0000-1121	Did not advance			
Pürevdorjiin Nyamlkhagva	–66 kg	Bye	van Kalken (NED); L 0001–0001	Did not advance			—N/a	Nakamura (JPN); L 0010–0011	Did not advance			
Tsend-Ayuushiin Ochirbat	–81 kg	Ouiminga (BUR); W 1100–0001	Belgaïd (MAR); W 0010–0000	Paseyro (URU); L 0000–1001	Did not advance							
Batjargalyn Odkhüü	–90 kg	—N/a	Xu (CHN); L 0001–1000	Did not advance								
Badmaanyambuugiin Bat-Erdene	+100 kg	Bye	Pan (CHN); L DQ	Did not advance								

Women

Athlete	Event	Round of 32	Round of 16	Quarterfinals	Semifinals	Repechage 1	Repechage 2	Repechage 3	Final / BM	
Athlete	Event	Opposition Result	Opposition Result	Opposition Result	Opposition Result	Opposition Result	Opposition Result	Opposition Result	Opposition Result	Rank
Khishigbatyn Erdenet-Od	–57 kg	Fernández (ESP); L 0000–1011	Did not advance			Wilson (USA); W 1000–0001	Kusakabe (JPN); L 0000–0010	Did not advance		
Dorjgotovyn Tserenkhand	–70 kg	Bye	Ueno (JPN); L 0000–1140	Did not advance						
Sambuugiin Dashdulam	–78 kg	Bye	Tang (CHN); L 0000–0001	Did not advance		Surkiýewa (TKM); W 1010–0000	Silva (BRA); L 0000–1011	Did not advance		

== Shooting ==
Athlete	Event	Qualification		Final		Total	
Athlete	Event	Points	Rank	Points	Rank	Points	Rank
Dorjsurengiin Mönkhbayar	Women's 25 m pistol	573	25	Did not advance			
Dorjsurengiin Mönkhbayar	Women's 10 m air pistol	368	36	Did not advance			
Otryadyn Gündegmaa	Women's 25 m pistol	581	7 Q	99.9	4	680.9	6
Otryadyn Gündegmaa	Women's 10 m air pistol	382	9	Did not advance			
Zorigtyn Batkhuyag	Women's 50 m rifle three positions	572	23	Did not advance			
Zorigtyn Batkhuyag	Women's 10 m air rifle	391	20	Did not advance			

== Swimming ==
Athlete	Event	Heat		Semifinal		Final	
Athlete	Event	Time	Rank	Time	Rank	Time	Rank
Ganaagiin Galbadrakh	Men's 100 m freestyle	58.79	67	Did not advance			
Sanjaajamtsyn Altantuyaa	Women's 100 m freestyle	1:10.22	53	Did not advance			

== Wrestling ==
Key:

- TO – Victory by Fall.
- SP – Decision by technical superiority (10 points difference) – the loser with technical points
- ST – Decision by technical superiority (10 points difference) – the loser without technical points
- PP – Decision by Points – the loser with technical points.
- PO – Decision by Points – the loser without technical points.
- VA – Victory by injury.

Freestyle

Athlete	Event	Elimination pool				Quarterfinals	Semifinals	Final / BM	
Athlete	Event	Opposition Result	Opposition Result	Opposition Result	Rank	Opposition Result	Opposition Result	Opposition Result	Rank
Tümendembereliin Züünbayan	–54 kg	Kardanov (GRE); L 0–4^{ST}	Railean (MDA); L 0–4^{TO}	Tayyebi (IRI); L 1–3^{PP}	4	Did not advance			
Oyuunbilegiin Pürevbaatar	–58 kg	Disqualified due to doping, stripped of 5th place							
Tümen-Ölziin Mönkhbayar	–76 kg	Laliyev (KAZ); L 0–3^{PO}	Dorostkar (IRI); L 0–3^{PO}	—N/a	3	Did not advance			
Dolgorsürengiin Sumyaabazar	–130 kg	Rodríguez (CUB); L 1–3^{PP}	Kochev (BUL); L 1–3^{PP}	—N/a	3	Did not advance			

== See also ==
- Mongolia at the 2000 Summer Paralympics
