= Wrestling at the 2000 Summer Olympics =

Wrestling at the Games of the XXVII Olympiad
- Venue: Sydney Convention and Exhibition Centre
- Dates: 28 September – 1 October 2000
- No. of events: 16
- Competitors: 314 from 55 nations

Wrestling at the 2000 Summer Olympics took place in the Sydney Convention and Exhibition Centre and was split into two disciplines, Freestyle and Greco-Roman which are further divided into different weight categories. The freestyle competitions were held from 28 September to 1 October, and the Greco-Roman events were held from 24 to 27 September. In the freestyle 76 kg Alexander Leipold of Germany originally placed first, but was disqualified after he tested positive for Nandrolone.

== Medalists ==
=== Freestyle ===
Event	Gold	Silver	Bronze
54 kg	Namig Abdullayev; Azerbaijan	Sammie Henson; United States	Amiran Kardanov; Greece
58 kg	Alireza Dabir; Iran	Yevhen Buslovych; Ukraine	Terry Brands; United States
63 kg	Murad Umakhanov; Russia	Serafim Barzakov; Bulgaria	Jang Jae-sung; South Korea
69 kg	Daniel Igali; Canada	Arsen Gitinov; Russia	Lincoln McIlravy; United States
76 kg	Brandon Slay; United States	Moon Eui-jae; South Korea	Adem Bereket; Turkey
85 kg	Adam Saitiev; Russia	Yoel Romero; Cuba	Magomed Ibragimov; Macedonia
97 kg	Sagid Murtazaliev; Russia	Islam Bayramukov; Kazakhstan	Eldar Kurtanidze; Georgia
130 kg	David Musulbes; Russia	Artur Taymazov; Uzbekistan	Alexis Rodríguez; Cuba

=== Greco-Roman ===
Event	Gold	Silver	Bronze
54 kg	Sim Kwon-ho; South Korea	Lázaro Rivas; Cuba	Kang Yong-gyun; North Korea
58 kg	Armen Nazaryan; Bulgaria	Kim In-sub; South Korea	Sheng Zetian; China
63 kg	Varteres Samurgashev; Russia	Juan Marén; Cuba	Akaki Chachua; Georgia
69 kg	Filiberto Azcuy; Cuba	Katsuhiko Nagata; Japan	Aleksey Glushkov; Russia
76 kg	Murat Kardanov; Russia	Matt Lindland; United States	Marko Yli-Hannuksela; Finland
85 kg	Hamza Yerlikaya; Turkey	Sándor Bárdosi; Hungary	Mukhran Vakhtangadze; Georgia
97 kg	Mikael Ljungberg; Sweden	Davyd Saldadze; Ukraine	Garrett Lowney; United States
130 kg	Rulon Gardner; United States	Aleksandr Karelin; Russia	Dmitry Debelka; Belarus

== Medal table ==
Rank	Nation	Gold	Silver	Bronze	Total
1	Russia	6	2	1	9
2	United States	2	2	3	7
3	Cuba	1	3	1	5
4	South Korea	1	2	1	4
5	Bulgaria	1	1	0	2
6	Turkey	1	0	1	2
7	Azerbaijan	1	0	0	1
7	Canada	1	0	0	1
7	Iran	1	0	0	1
7	Sweden	1	0	0	1
11	Ukraine	0	2	0	2
12	Hungary	0	1	0	1
12	Japan	0	1	0	1
12	Kazakhstan	0	1	0	1
12	Uzbekistan	0	1	0	1
16	Georgia	0	0	3	3
17	Belarus	0	0	1	1
17	China	0	0	1	1
17	Finland	0	0	1	1
17	Greece	0	0	1	1
17	Macedonia	0	0	1	1
17	North Korea	0	0	1	1
Totals (22 entries)		16	16	16	48

== Participating nations ==
A total of 314 wrestlers from 55 nations competed at the Sydney Games:

- Algeria (2)
- Armenia (8)
- Australia (11)
- Azerbaijan (9)
- Belarus (14)
- Bulgaria (8)
- Canada (4)
- China (5)
- Colombia (1)
- Cuba (13)
- Czech Republic (3)
- Egypt (2)
- Estonia (3)
- Finland (4)
- France (3)
- Georgia (13)
- Germany (10)
- Greece (7)
- Guinea-Bissau (1)
- Hungary (8)
- India (1)
- Iran (11)
- Israel (3)
- Italy (2)
- Ivory Coast (1)
- Japan (8)
- Kazakhstan (11)
- Kyrgyzstan (6)
- Latvia (1)
- Lithuania (2)
- Macedonia (2)
- Moldova (4)
- Mongolia (4)
- Netherlands (1)
- New Zealand (3)
- Nigeria (2)
- North Korea (4)
- Norway (1)
- Poland (9)
- Romania (5)
- Russia (16)
- Samoa (1)
- Senegal (1)
- Slovakia (4)
- South Africa (1)
- South Korea (10)
- Sweden (5)
- Switzerland (4)
- Tunisia (4)
- Turkey (12)
- Turkmenistan (1)
- Ukraine (16)
- United States (16)
- Uzbekistan (11)
- Venezuela (2)
