= Salifou Koucka Ouiminga =

Burkinabé judoka

Personal information
- Born: 4 April 1977 (age 48)

Sport
- Sport: Judo

Salifou Koucka Ouiminga (born 4 April 1977) is a Burkinabé judoka who competed at the 2000 Summer Olympics.

Ouiminga competed in the half-middleweight division at the 2000 Summer Olympics, but he lost in the first round against Tsend-Ayuushiin Ochirbat from Mongolia.
