= Nasir Gadzhikhanov =

Macedonian wrestler

Personal information
- Nationality: Russian; Macedonian
- Born: 16 February 1967 Makhachkala, Russia
- Died: 29 May 2012 (aged 45)

Sport
- Sport: Wrestling
Medal record
Representing Soviet Union
World Championships
| Silver medal – second place | 1990 Tokyo | 74 kg |
| Bronze medal – third place | 1991 Varna | 74 kg |

Nasir Gadzhikhanov (16 February 1967 – 29 May 2012) was a Russian naturalized Macedonian wrestler. He competed in the men's freestyle 76 kg at the 2000 Summer Olympics.
