= Miroslav Gochev =

Bulgarian freestyle wrestler

Personal information
- Full name: Miroslav Angelov Gochev
- Nationality: Bulgaria
- Born: 9 April 1973 (age 53) Burgas, Bulgaria
- Height: 1.76 m (5 ft 9 1/2 in)
- Weight: 88 kg (194 lb)

Sport
- Style: Freestyle
- Club: Slavia Litex
- Coach: Miho Dukov
Medal record
Men's freestyle wrestling
Representing Bulgaria
World Championships
| Bronze medal – third place | 1997 Wrocław | 76 kg |
European Championships
| Silver medal – second place | 2001 Budapest | 76 kg |

Miroslav Angelov Gochev (Bulgarian: Мирослав Ангелов Гочев; born April 9, 1973, in Burgas) is a retired amateur Bulgarian freestyle wrestler, who competed in the men's light heavyweight category. Gochev has claimed a bronze medal in the 76-kg division at the 1997 World Wrestling Championships in Wrocław, Poland, picked up a silver at the 2001 European Championships in Budapest, Hungary, and later represented his nation Bulgaria at the 2004 Summer Olympics. Throughout his sporting career, Gochev trained full-time as a member of the wrestling squad for Slavia Litex Sports Club in Sofia under his personal coach Miho Dukov.

Gochev qualified for the Bulgarian squad, as a 31-year-old veteran, in the men's 84 kg class at the 2004 Summer Olympics in Athens, by receiving an allocated berth from the International Federation of Associated Wrestling (FILA). Facing two Olympic medalists from Sydney four years earlier, Gochev opened an astonishing 4–2 victory over Macedonia's Mogamed Ibragimov, but could not push South Korean wrestler Moon Eui-Jae off the mat, and suffered a defeat by a 5–9 score at the end of the round-robin. Although Gochev finished second in the prelim pool and twelfth overall, his performance was not enough to advance him to the quarterfinals.
