= Guram Mchedlidze (wrestler) =

Georgian wrestler

Personal information
- Nationality: Georgian
- Born: 12 August 1972 (age 53) Ochamchire, Georgia

Sport
- Sport: Wrestling

Guram Mchedlidze (born 12 August 1972) is a Georgian wrestler. He competed in the men's freestyle 76 kg at the 2000 Summer Olympics.
