= Yosmany Romero =

Cuban wrestler (born 1976)

Personal information
- Born: 20 May 1976 (age 50) Ciego de Ávila, Cuba

Sport
- Sport: Wrestling
Medal record
Representing Cuba
Pan American Games
Silver medal – second place	1999 Winnipeg	-76kg freestyle

Yosmany Romero Rodríguez (born 20 May 1976) is a Cuban wrestler. He competed in the men's freestyle 76 kg at the 2000 Summer Olympics.
