= Uzbekistan at the 2000 Summer Olympics =

- IOC code: UZB
- NOC: National Olympic Committee of the Republic of Uzbekistan
- Website: www.olympic.uz (in Uzbek and English)

in Sydney
- Competitors: 70 (52 men and 18 women) in 11 sports
- Flag bearer: Mahammatkodir Abdoollayev
- Medals Ranked 43rd: Gold 1 Silver 1 Bronze 2 Total 4

Summer Olympics appearances (overview)
- 1996; 2000; 2004; 2008; 2012; 2016; 2020; 2024

Other related appearances
- Russian Empire (1900–1912); Soviet Union (1952–1988); Unified Team (1992)

Uzbekistan was represented at the 2000 Summer Olympics in Sydney, New South Wales, Australia by the National Olympic Committee of the Republic of Uzbekistan.

In total, 70 athletes including 52 men and 18 women represented Uzbekistan in 11 different sports including athletics, boxing, canoeing, fencing, gymnastics, judo, shooting, swimming, tennis, weightlifting and wrestling.

Uzbekistan won four medals at the games after Mahammatkodir Abdoollayev claimed gold, Sergey Mihaylov and Rustam Saidov won bronze in the boxing and Artur Taymazov won silver in the wrestling.

== Competitors ==
In total, 70 athletes represented Uzbekistan at the 2000 Summer Olympics in Sydney, New South Wales, Australia across 12 different sports.

Sport	Men	Women	Total
Athletics	13	9	22
Boxing	10	–	10
Canoeing	1	0	1
Fencing	0	1	1
Gymnastics	0	2	2
Judo	7	0	7
Shooting	1	2	3
Swimming	7	3	10
Tennis	0	1	1
Weightlifting	2	0	2
Wrestling	11	0	11
Total	52	18	70

== Medalists ==
Uzbekistan won four medals at the games including one gold, one silver and two bronze. Mahammatkodir Abdoollayev won gold in the boxing light welterweight category. Artur Taymazov claimed silver in the wrestling freestyle –130 kg. Sergey Mihaylov and Rustam Saidov won bronze in their respective boxing categories – light heavyweight and super heavyweight respectively.

Medal	Name	Sport	Event
Gold	Mahammatkodir Abdoollayev	Boxing	Light welterweight
Silver	Artur Taymazov	Wrestling	Freestyle –130 kg
Bronze	Sergey Mihaylov	Boxing	Light heavyweight
Bronze	Rustam Saidov	Boxing	Super heavyweight

== Athletics ==
In total, 22 Uzbek athletes participated in the athletics events – Andrey Abduvaliyev, Zamira Amirova, Lyudmila Dmitriadi, Erkinjon Isakov, Oleg Juravlyov, Safiya Kabanova, Vitaliy Khozhatelev, Guzel Khubbieva, Rustam Khusnutdinov, Natalya Kobina, Anvar Kuchmuradov, Yelena Kvyatkovskaya, Lyubov Perepelova, Yevgeniy Petin, Elena Piskunova, Roman Poltoratsky, Natalya Senkina, Victor Ustinov, Oleg Veretelnikov, Sergey Voynov, Nikolay Yeroshenko, Konstantin Zhuravlyov.

== Boxing ==
In total, 10 Uzbek athletes participated in the boxing events – Muhammad Abdullaev in the light welterweight category, Ruslan Chagaev in the heavyweight category, Utkirbek Haydarov in the middleweight category, Sherzod Husanov in the welterweight category, Sergey Mihaylov in the light heavyweight category, Alisher Rahimov, in the bantamweight category, Rustam Saidov in the super heavyweight category, Tulkunbay Turgunov in the featherweight category, Dilshod Yarbekov in the light middleweight category and Dilshod Yuldashev in the light flyweight category.

== Canoeing ==
In total, one Uzbek athlete participated in the canoeing events – Anton Ryakhov in the men's K-1 500 m and the men's K-1 1,000 m.

== Fencing ==
In total, one Uzbek athlete participated in the fencing events – Anisa Petrova in the women's épée.

== Gymnastics ==
In total, two Uzbek athletes participated in the gymnastics events – Oksana Chusovitina in the women's individual all-around, the women's floor, the women's vault, the women's uneven bars and the women's balance beam and Ekaterina Khilko in the women's trampoline.

== Judo ==
In total, seven Uzbek athletes participated in the judo events – Armen Bagdasarov in the men's –100 kg category, Alisher Mukhtarov in the men's –60 kg category, Kamol Muradov in the men's –90 kg category, Andrey Shturbabin in the men's –73 kg category, Abdullo Tangriev in the men's +100 kg category, Farkhod Turayev in the men's –81 kg category and Mansur Zhumayev in the men's –66 kg category.

== Shooting ==
In total, three Uzbek athletes participated in the shooting events – Alyona Aksyonova and Yuliya Shakhova in the women's 10 m air rifle and the women's 50 m rifle three positions and Dilshod Mukhtarov in the men's 10 m air rifle and the men's 50 m pistol.

== Swimming ==
In total, 10 Uzbek athletes participated in the swimming events – Aleksandr Agafonov, Mariya Bugakova, Saida Iskandarova, Anastasiya Korolyova, Ravil Nachaev, Oleg Pukhnatiy, Dmitry Tsutskarev, Oleg Tsvetkovskiy, Petr Vasiliev and Sergey Voytsekhovich.

== Tennis ==
In total, one Uzbek athlete participated in the tennis events – Iroda Tulyaganova in the women's singles.

== Weightlifting ==
In total, two Uzbek athletes participated in the weightlifting events – Bakhtiyor Nurullaev in the men's –85 kg category and Igor Khalilov in the men's +105 kg.

== Wrestling ==
In total, 11 Uzbek athletes participated in the wrestling events – Adkhamjon Achilov in the freestyle –54 kg category, Dilshod Aripov in the Greco-Roman –58 kg category, Ruslan Biktyakov in the Greco-Roman –69 kg category, Evgeniy Erofaylov in the Greco-Roman –76 kg category, Ramil Islamov in the freestyle –63 kg category, Makharbek Khadartsev in the freestyle –85 kg category, Ruslan Khinchagov in the freestyle –76 kg category, Bakhodir Kurbanov in the Greco-Roman –63 kg category, Artur Taymazov in the freestyle –130 kg category, Yury Vitt in the Greco-Roman –85 kg category and Damir Zakhartdinov in the freestyle –58 kg category.
