= Brandon Slay =

American wrestler (born 1975)

Personal information
- Full name: Brandon Douglas Slay
- Born: October 14, 1975 (age 50) Amarillo, Texas, U.S.
- Height: 5 ft 8 in (173 cm)
- Weight: 76 kg (168 lb)
Medal record
Men's freestyle wrestling
Representing the United States
Olympic Games
Gold medal – first place	2000 Sydney	76 kg
Pacific Ocean Games
Gold medal – first place	1995 Cali	82 kg
Collegiate Wrestling
Representing the Penn Quakers
NCAA Division I Championships
Silver medal – second place	1997 Cedar Falls	167 lb
Silver medal – second place	1998 Cleveland	167 lb
EIWA Championships
Gold medal – first place	1997 Philadelphia	167 lb
Gold medal – first place	1998 Bethlehem	167 lb
Silver medal – second place	1995 Annapolis	167 lb
Bronze medal – third place	1994 Ithaca	167 lb

Brandon Douglas Slay (born October 14, 1975) is an American former freestyle wrestler. He won an Olympic gold medal for the United States in wrestling at the 2000 Summer Olympics. Slay also helped found Dallas Dynamite wrestling club in Dallas, Texas. Slay currently is the Assistant National Freestyle Coach and National Freestyle Resident Coach for USA wrestling, stationed at the Olympic Training Center (USOTC) in Colorado Springs.

== Early life ==
He graduated from Tascosa High School in Amarillo, Texas, where he was a three-time state champion in wrestling.

== College career ==
Slay studied business at the University of Pennsylvania and received a degree from the Wharton School of Business. He wrestled all four years at Pennsylvania, where he was a two-time national runner-up and All-American in the NCAA tournament at 167 pounds. Slay was also a four-time All-Ivy wrestler, and two-time EIWA champion. He is a member of the Alpha Tau Omega fraternity.

== 2000 Olympic Games in Sydney ==
At the 2000 Olympic Games in Sydney, Australia, Slay would beat defending Olympic champion Buvaisar Saitiev of Russia in his pool to advance to the knockout round. From there, he would win two more matches, making the gold medal match, where he lost to Alexander Leipold of Germany. Afterwards, Leipold would test positive for the steroid nandrolone, and the gold medal was awarded to Slay.

== Personal life ==
Slay is a devout Christian and runs Greater Gold, which does speeches and camps about Christ and wrestling.

In 2016, Slay was inducted into the National Wrestling Hall of Fame as a Distinguished Member.
