= Elshad Allahverdiyev =

Azerbaijani wrestler

Elşad Allahverdiyev
Personal information
- Nationality: Azerbaijani
- Born: 27 June 1973 (age 53)

Sport
- Sport: Wrestling
Medal record
Men's freestyle wrestling
Representing Azerbaijan
World Military Championships
| Bronze medal – third place | 1999 Zagreb | 76 kg |

Elşad Ahad Allahverdiyev (born 27 June 1973) is an Azerbaijani wrestler. He competed at the 1996 Summer Olympics and the 2000 Summer Olympics.
