= Pejman Dorostkar =

Iranian wrestler (born 1976)

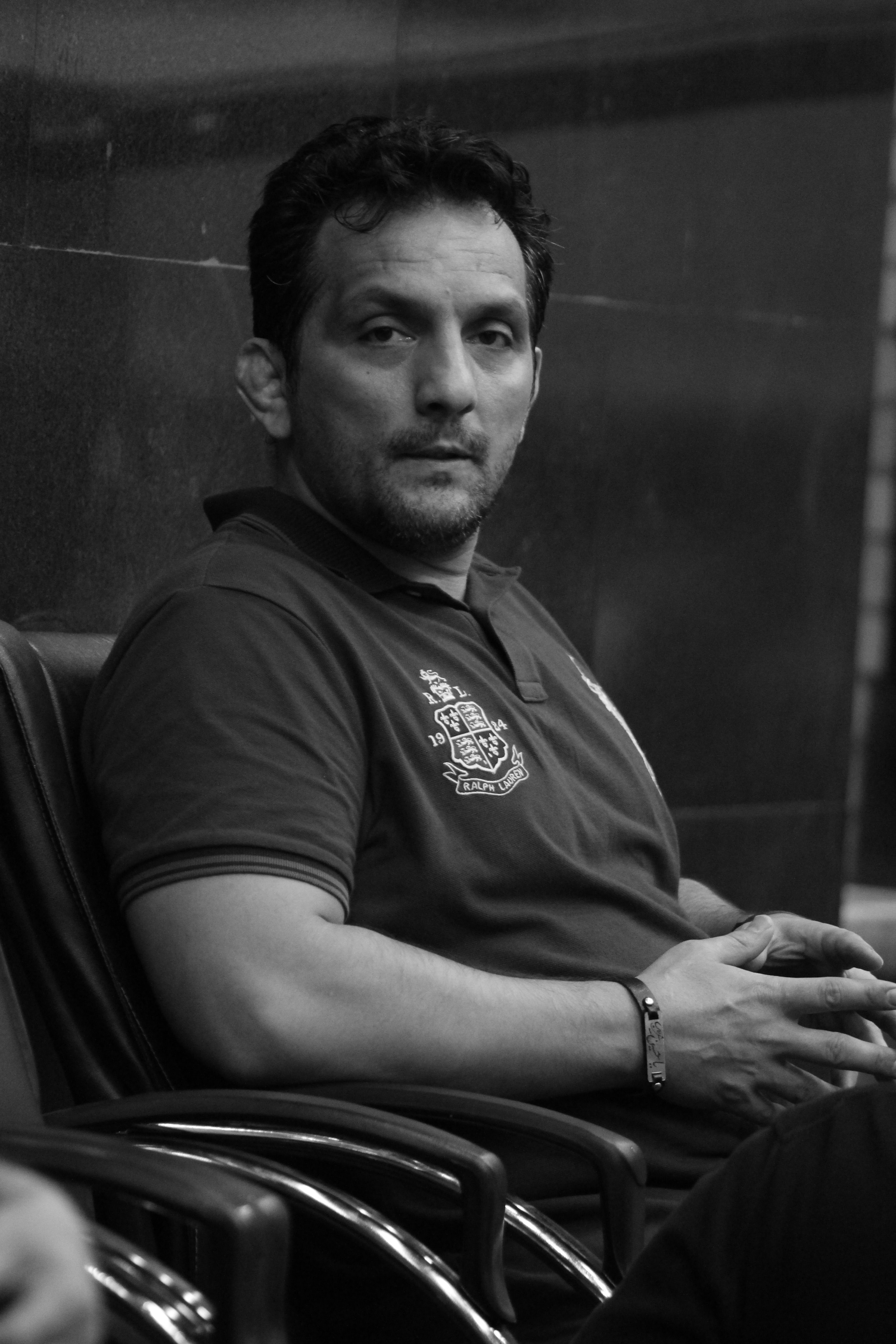

Personal information
- Nationality: Iranian
- Born: 18 August 1976 (age 49) Tehran, Iran
- Height: 180 cm (5 ft 11 in)
- Weight: 85 kg (187 lb)

Sport
- Country: Iran
- Sport: Wrestling
- Event: Freestyle
- Club: SV Siegfried Hallbergmoos; SV Wacker Burghausen
- Coached by: Ehsan Dorostkar; Ali Abdolkarimi; Hossein Maleki
Medal record
Men's Freestyle Wrestling
Representing Iran
World Cup
Bronze medal – third place	1999 Spokane	76 kg
Asian Championships
Gold medal – first place	Ulaanbaatar 2001	85 kg
Gold medal – first place	New Delhi 2003	84 kg
World University Championships
Gold medal – first place	2004 Łódź	84 kg
World Cadet Championship
Bronze medal – third place	1992 Istanbul	76 kg

Pejman Dorostkar (Persian: پژمان درستکار, born 18 August 1976 in Tehran) is an Iranian wrestling coach. He was formerly a wrestler. He competed at the 2000 Summer Olympics in Sydney, in the men's freestyle 76 kg. He won two gold medals at the 2001 and 2003 Asian Championships.

== Wrestling accomplishments ==
- 1992 World Junior Bronze Medalist Turkey
- 1999 US World Cup bronze medalist
- World Student Gold Medal Winner 2004 Poland
- Wrestler in the 2003 Bundesliga, 2003, 2004, 2005

=== Coaching records ===
- In 2013, Head coach of Samen Al-Hojaj team, the Champion of the Iranian Wrestling Premier League
- In 2017, Head coach of the Iranian team for the deaf won the Turkish Deaf Olympics
- In 2018, Head coach of the Iranian deaf team, the World deaf champion of Russia
- In 2018, Head coach of Iran Mall, the Champion of the Iranian Wrestling Premier League
- In 2019, Head coach of Iran Mall, the Champion of the Iranian Wrestling Premier League
- In 2019, Head coach of Iran Mall, the World champion club of Iran
- In 2019, Head coach of the Iranian national youth freestyle wrestling team
- In 2021, Head coach of the Iran national freestyle wrestling team.

At the 2021 World Wrestling Championships, the Iranian national freestyle wrestling team led by Pejman Dorostkar won three gold, three silver and one bronze medal with 163 points.
