= Alik Muzaiev =

Ukrainian wrestler

Personal information
- Nationality: Ukrainian
- Born: 27 July 1978 (age 47)

Sport
- Sport: Wrestling

Alik Muzaiev (born 27 July 1978) is a Ukrainian wrestler. He competed in the men's freestyle 76 kg at the 2000 Summer Olympics.
