= Jannie du Toit =

South African wrestler

Personal information
- Nationality: South African
- Born: 18 February 1970 (age 56)

Sport
- Sport: Wrestling

Jannie du Toit (born 18 February 1970) is a South African wrestler. He competed in the men's freestyle 76 kg at the 2000 Summer Olympics.
