= Adem Bereket =

Turkish wrestler

Personal information
- Full name: Adam Askhabovich Barakhoev
- Born: 19 July 1973 (age 53) Kurtat, North Ossetian ASSR, Soviet Union

Sport
- Sport: Freestyle wrestling
- Weight class: 74–76 kg
- Club: İstanbul Büyükşehir Belediyesi S.K.
- Coached by: Alaudin Barakhoev, Alihan Kharsiev
Medal record
Men's freestyle wrestling
Representing Turkey
Olympic Games
Bronze medal – third place	2000 Sydney	76 kg
World Championships
Bronze medal – third place	1999 Ankara	76 kg
European Championships
Silver medal – second place	2000 Budapest	76 kg

Adem Bereket (born Adam Askhabovich Barakhoev, Russian: Адам Асхабович Барахоев; 19 July 1973) is a former freestyle wrestler of Ingush origin who competed internationally for Turkey. He won a bronze medal at the 2000 Summer Olympics in the men's freestyle 76 kg category.

== Career ==
Adem Bereket initially pursued football and judo before committing to freestyle wrestling at the age of 10. His first coach was his cousin Alaudin Barakhoev, a physical education teacher in his hometown of Kurtat, North Ossetia. For four years, Bereket traveled daily from his village to Ordzhonikidze for training before moving to the capital of North Ossetia to train at the Spartak sports school under Hasan Apaev. He became a three-time champion of North Ossetia and twice a medalist in the South Russia regional competitions. After receiving his passport in 1990, he moved to Krasnoyarsk at the invitation of Dmitry Mindiashvili and won the Russian Cup in 1993. His first major success at the senior level came in 1996 when he won the Russian National Championship in Tula by defeating Nasyr Gadzhikhanov in the final. Later that year, he won silver at the Wrestling World Cup in Tehran and silver at the World University Championship, also held in Tehran, losing the final to Turkish wrestler Nuri Zengin.

By 1999, realizing that he would not make the Russian Olympic team, Bereket explored opportunities to compete for other countries. After winning international tournaments in Poland and Turkey, he received offers from Australia, Cyprus, Kazakhstan, and Turkey. On the advice of his mentor and sponsor Alihan Kharsiev, he chose to represent Turkey, where he found better training conditions. He acquired Turkish citizenship and adopted the name Adem Bereket, which means "blessing" or "prosperity" in Turkish.

At the 2000 Summer Olympics in Sydney, Bereket won his pool matches against Guram Mchedlidze (Georgia) and Árpád Ritter (Hungary), and defeated Uzbekistan's Ruslan Kinchagov in the quarterfinals. He lost in the semifinals to American wrestler Brandon Slay and in the bronze medal match to South Korea’s Moon Eui-jae. However, following the disqualification of Germany’s Alexander Leipold for doping, Bereket was awarded the Olympic bronze medal in a reallocation of medals.

Bereket was unable to compete at the 2004 Summer Olympics in Athens due to a shoulder injury sustained earlier in Sydney. He underwent surgery and returned to win the Turkish national title in 2004. Later that year, the Turkish Olympic Committee awarded him a special honor and diploma recognizing him as one of the country's top athletes.

He transitioned to coaching shortly thereafter, joining his former coach Hasan Apaev in leading the Turkish national freestyle team. In late 2005, Bereket was appointed head coach of the Turkish national team. Under his leadership, Turkey secured second place at the 2007 World Wrestling Championships, the nation’s best result abroad since 1989. That same year, he joined the FILA (now UWW) coaching staff. Bereket aimed to train an Olympic champion, and discovered Ramazan Irbaikhanov, a Chechen wrestler from Khasavyurt. After observing him for six months, he invited him to Turkey. Within 13 months of working together, Irbaikhanov (who took the name Ramazan Şahin in Turkey) became world, European, and Olympic champion at the 2008 Beijing Games.

In October 2008, Bereket was awarded the honorary title "Merited Coach of Turkey" and was signed for a second Olympic cycle, a first in Turkish sports history. In November 2008, he was named the World’s Best Coach by FILA and received a gold medal, badge, and trophy from FILA president Raphaël Martinetti.

Bereket stepped down from the Turkish national team coaching role in 2011. He also coached Selim Yaşar, a wrestler of Ingush origin who later became a silver medalist at the 2016 Rio Olympics, where he lost to Abdulrashid Sadulaev of Russia in the final.
