= Radion Kertanti =

Slovak wrestler

Personal information
- Nationality: Slovak
- Born: 9 January 1971 (age 55) Chikola, Russian SFSR, Soviet Union

Sport
- Sport: Wrestling

Radion Kertanti (born 9 January 1971) is a Slovak wrestler. He competed at the 1996 Summer Olympics and the 2000 Summer Olympics.
