= Marcin Jurecki =

Polish wrestler

Marcin Jurecki (11 November 1976, in Połczyn-Zdrój – 26 February 2008, in Warsaw) was a Polish wrestler who competed in the 2000 Summer Olympics. He finished in 8th place. He also represented Poland at the Wrestling World Championships in 1997–1998 and 2001–2003. His highest finish was 2002, when he placed 5th.
