= Rein Ozoline =

Australian wrestler

Personal information
- Height: 6-9

Sport
- Club: Moda Watch Club (former)
Medal record
Commonwealth Games
Bronze medal – third place	2002 Manchester	Freestyle 74 kg

Reinold "Rein" Ozoline (born 18 May 1967 in Leningrad, Soviet Union) is an Australian former wrestler who competed in the 1996 Summer Olympics and in the 2000 Summer Olympics.
