= Moon Eui-jae =

South Korean wrestler (born 1975)

Medal record

Men's freestyle wrestling

Representing South Korea

Olympic Games
Silver medal – second place	2000 Sydney	76 kg
Silver medal – second place	2004 Athens	84 kg

World Championships
Silver medal – second place	1998 Tehran	76 kg
Silver medal – second place	2001 Sofia	76 kg

Asian Games
Gold medal – first place	1998 Bangkok	76 kg
Gold medal – first place	2002 Busan	84 kg

Asian Championships
Gold medal – first place	1997 Tehran	76 kg

Moon Eui-jae (Korean: 문의제; Hanja: 文儀濟; born February 10, 1975) is a retired South Korean wrestler who won two Olympic silver medals in freestyle wrestling, Men's Freestyle 76 kg at the 2000 Summer Olympics and Men's Freestyle 84 kg in Athens in 2004. In Sydney, he lost his semi-final and won the bronze medal match, but was awarded the silver medal later after the disqualification of Alexander Leipold due to a drug infraction. He was also runner-up at the World Championships in 1998 and 2001, and was gold medalist at the 1998 and 2002 Asian Games.

== Sources ==
- Profile at FILA Wrestling Database
