= Ruslan Khinchagov =

Uzbekistani freestyle wrestler

Ruslan Khinchagov (born January 29, 1970, in North Ossetia-Alania) is a former competitor in Freestyle Wrestling from Russia, who represented Uzbekistan. Ruslan competed in the 1996 Olympic Games and 2000 Olympic Games. He finished 15th in 1996 and 5th in 2000.

Kinchagov also represented Uzbekistan at the World Wrestling Championships in 1993, 1994, 1995, 1997, 1999 and 2001. He won a bronze medal in 1993 and 1995.
