= Tümen-Ölziin Mönkhbayar =

Mongolian wrestler

Personal information
- Nationality: Mongolian
- Born: 27 August 1973 (age 52)

Sport
- Sport: Wrestling

Tümen-Ölziin Mönkhbayar (born 27 August 1973) is a Mongolian wrestler. He competed in the men's freestyle 76 kg at the 2000 Summer Olympics.
