= Alexander Leipold =

German wrestler (born 1969)

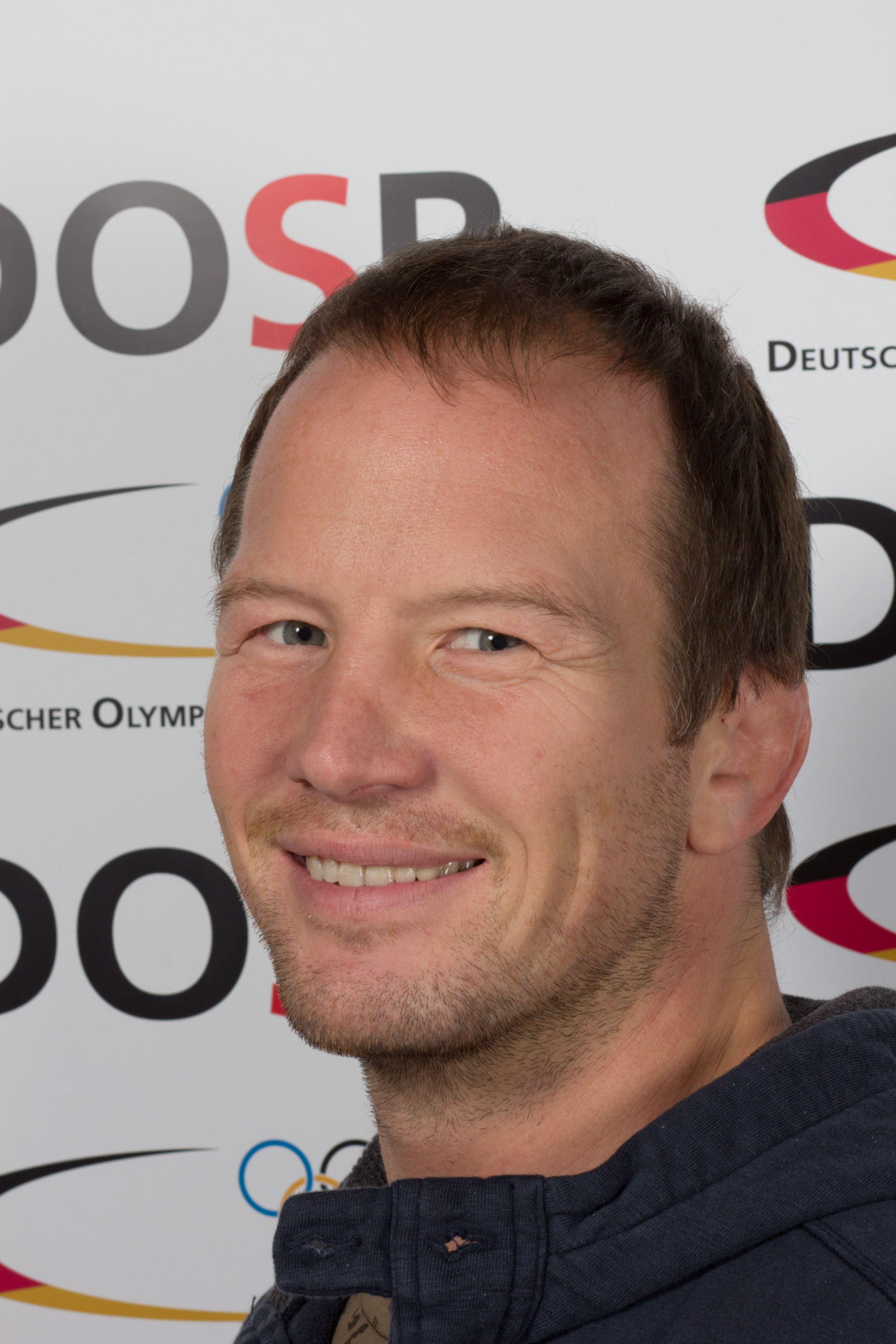
- Leipold in 2012

Personal information
- Nationality: Germany
- Born: Alexander Leipold; June 2, 1969 (age 57) Alzenau, West Germany
- Height: 178 cm (5 ft 10 in)

Sport
- Country: Germany
- Sport: Wrestling
- Weight class: 74 kg
- Event: Freestyle
Medal record
Men's freestyle wrestling
Representing Germany
Olympic Games
Disqualified	2000 Sydney	76 kg
World Championships
Gold medal – first place	1994 Istanbul	68 kg
Silver medal – second place	1999 Ankara	76 kg
Silver medal – second place	1997 Krasnoyarsk	76 kg
Silver medal – second place	1995 Atlanta	74 kg
Bronze medal – third place	1998 Tehran	76 kg
World Cup
Gold medal – first place	1999 Spokane	76 kg
Gold medal – first place	1998 Stillwater	76 kg
Gold medal – first place	1997 Stillwater	76 kg
Bronze medal – third place	2002 Spokane	74 kg
European Championships
Gold medal – first place	1998 Bratislava	76 kg
Gold medal – first place	1995 Fribourg	74 kg
Gold medal – first place	1991 Stuttgart	74 kg
Silver medal – second place	2003 Riga	74 kg
Silver medal – second place	1997 Warsaw	76 kg
Bronze medal – third place	1999 Minsk	76 kg
Bronze medal – third place	1994 Rome	74 kg

Alexander Leipold (born 2 June 1969 in Alzenau in Unterfranken) is a German former freestyle wrestler who won the German Championships eleven times, the European Championships three times, the World Championships in 1994, and won the tournament at the 2000 Summer Olympics but was later stripped of his gold medal for doping.

== Wrestling career ==
Leipold won the German Junior Championships in freestyle wrestling in 1985, 1986, 1988 and 1989, and was runner-up in 1987. After being runner-up in the German Championships in 1988 and 1989, he won in 1991, 1992, 1994–1999, 2002, 2003 and 2005, and was runner-up in 2004 and third in 1993.

He was runner-up in the European Junior Championships in 1985 and finished fifth in 1987. He won the European Espoir Championships in 1988, and finished sixth in the European Championships the same year before winning them in 1991, 1995 and 1998. He was runner-up in 1997 and 2003, and third in 1994 and 1999.

He won the World Espoir Championships in 1984 the World Championships in 1994, and was runner-up in 1995, 1997 and 1999, and third in 1998.

At the 1988 Summer Olympics, he finished seventh, in 1992 thirteenth, and at the 1996 Olympics fifth.

At the 2000 Summer Olympics, he won the freestyle tournament, winning the final 4–0 against Brandon Slay. Leipold then tested positive for norandrosterone and noretiocholanolone, which are used to prove the presence of the steroid nandrolone, and the gold medal was awarded to Slay. Prince Alexandre de Merode, the chairman of the IOC medical commission, was quoted as saying that Leipold's sample showed 20 nanograms of nandrolone per milliliter of urine, whereas the limit was 2 nanograms per milliliter.

The German Wrestling Federation suspended Leipold for two years, but the suspension was lifted because the federation had taken more than the permitted seven days to announce their decision.

Leipold had a receipt for 50 milliliters of urine for the B sample, but the laboratory report stated that 85 milliliters had been tested. He appealed the decision of the IOC and his suspension from competition was reduced from two years to one year, and he was not required to pay the costs.

Another freestyle wrestler, the Mongolian Oyunbileg Purevbaata, also failed a doping test at the same Olympics.

In 2003, Leipold suffered a heart attack during a competition in Tashkent and was paralysed on one side, and suffered a further two heart attacks, but recovered relatively quickly, so that he was able to continue wrestling.

== Trainer ==
He studied and qualified in April 2009 for a trainer diploma at the Trainer Academy Cologne, and was German federal trainer for juniors in free style wrestling until 2015

== Personal life ==
He married Juliana Marx, and lives with his wife and two sons in Karlstein am Main.

== Bibliography ==
- Ich glaub' an mich - ein Ringerleben by Alexander Leipold and Klaus Weise, ISBN 978-3-936261-28-8
