= 1999 World Wrestling Championships – Men's freestyle 69 kg =

Men's freestyle 69 kg at the 1999 World Championships
- Venue: Atatürk Sport Hall
- Dates: 8–10 October 1999
- Competitors: 40 from 40 nations

Medalists
gold medal	Daniel Igali	Canada
silver medal	Lincoln McIlravy	United States
bronze medal	Yüksel Şanlı	Turkey

The men's freestyle 69 kilograms is a competition featured at the 1999 World Wrestling Championships, and was held at the Atatürk Sport Hall in Ankara, Turkey from 8 to 10 October 1999.

== Results ==
Legend

- F — Won by fall

=== Preliminary round ===
==== Pool 1 ====
Pos	Athlete	Pld	W	L	CP	TP	SYR	POL	ESP
1	Ahmad Al-Osta (SYR)	2	2	0	7	13	—	2–2	11–0 Fall
2	Mariusz Dąbrowski (POL)	2	1	1	5	12	1–3 PP	—	10–0
3	Carlos Domínguez (ESP)	2	0	2	0	0	0–4 TO	0–4 ST	—

Source: Official website

==== Pool 2 ====
Pos	Athlete	Pld	W	L	CP	TP	CAN	GER	AUT
1	Daniel Igali (CAN)	2	2	0	7	17	—	6–3	11–0
2	Jens Gündling (GER)	2	1	1	5	29	1–3 PP	—	26–0 Fall
3	Mario Hartmann (AUT)	2	0	2	0	0	0–4 ST	0–4 TO	—

Source: Official website

==== Pool 3 ====
Pos	Athlete	Pld	W	L	CP	TP	ROM	ITA	VEN
1	Dima Andronic (ROM)	2	2	0	7	27	—	8–5	19–1
2	Salvatore Rinella (ITA)	2	1	1	4	16	1–3 PP	—	11–5
3	Juan Suárez (VEN)	2	0	2	2	6	1–4 SP	1–3 PP	—

Source: Official website

==== Pool 4 ====
Pos	Athlete	Pld	W	L	CP	TP	KGZ	IND	FRA
1	Almaz Askarov (KGZ)	2	2	0	6	8	—	5–3	3–0
2	Sujeet Maan (IND)	2	1	1	5	15	1–3 PP	—	12–1 Fall
3	Ibrahim Selloum (FRA)	2	0	2	0	1	0–3 PO	0–4 TO	—

Source: Official website

==== Pool 5 ====
Pos	Athlete	Pld	W	L	CP	TP	USA	KAZ	BUL
1	Lincoln McIlravy (USA)	2	2	0	8	19	—	14–4	5–0 Fall
2	Ruslan Veliyev (KAZ)	2	1	1	5	23	1–4 SP	—	19–1 Fall
3	Ivan Todorov (BUL)	2	0	2	0	1	0–4 TO	0–4 TO	—

Source: Official website

==== Pool 6 ====
Pos	Athlete	Pld	W	L	CP	TP	IRI	RUS	HUN
1	Amir Tavakkolian (IRI)	2	2	0	6	7	—	4–0	3–1
2	Sihamir Osmanov (RUS)	2	1	1	3	4	0–3 PO	—	4–3
3	János Fórizs (HUN)	2	0	2	2	4	1–3 PP	1–3 PP	—

Source: Official website

==== Pool 7 ====
Pos	Athlete	Pld	W	L	CP	TP	UKR	UZB	RSA
1	Zaza Zazirov (UKR)	2	2	0	6	18	—	13–10	5–1
2	Igor Kupeev (UZB)	2	1	1	5	23	1–3 PP	—	13–2
3	Barend Labuschagne (RSA)	2	0	2	2	3	1–3 PP	1–4 SP	—

Source: Official website

==== Pool 8 ====
Pos	Athlete	Pld	W	L	CP	TP	ARM	MDA	SVK
1	Arayik Gevorgyan (ARM)	2	2	0	7	22	—	12–10	10–0
2	Ivan Diaconu (MDA)	2	1	1	5	31	1–3 PP	—	21–2 Fall
3	Tibor Čopík (SVK)	2	0	2	0	2	0–4 ST	0–4 TO	—

Source: Official website

==== Pool 9 ====
Pos	Athlete	Pld	W	L	CP	TP	CUB	MGL	AZE
1	Yosvany Sánchez (CUB)	2	2	0	8	21	—	11–1	10–0
2	Adiyaakhüügiin Boldsükh (MGL)	2	1	1	4	12	1–4 SP	—	11–9
3	Oktay Shahverdiyev (AZE)	2	0	2	1	9	0–4 ST	1–3 PP	—

Source: Official website

==== Pool 10 ====
Pos	Athlete	Pld	W	L	CP	TP	KOR	FIN	MKD
1	Hwang Sang-ho (KOR)	2	2	0	6	12	—	6–1	6–1
2	Juha Lappalainen (FIN)	2	1	1	5	12	1–3 PP	—	11–3 Fall
3	Hamid Bakija (MKD)	2	0	2	1	4	1–3 PP	0–4 TO	—

Source: Official website

==== Pool 11 ====
Pos	Athlete	Pld	W	L	CP	TP	CHN	GBR	NED
1	Xu Xuanchong (CHN)	2	2	0	7	22	—	6–0	16–4
2	Nate Ackerman (GBR)	2	1	1	3	8	0–3 PO	—	8–4
3	Vehbi Hajdari (NED)	2	0	2	2	8	1–4 SP	1–3 PP	—

Source: Official website

==== Pool 12 ====
Pos	Athlete	Pld	W	L	CP	TP	GRE	AUS	TPE
1	Nikolaos Loizidis (GRE)	2	2	0	8	21	—	11–1	10–0
2	Ali Abdo (AUS)	2	1	1	4	12	1–4 SP	—	11–6
3	Lin Yu-chiang (TPE)	2	0	2	1	6	0–4 ST	1–3 PP	—

Source: Official website

==== Pool 13 ====
Pos	Athlete	Pld	W	L	CP	TP	GEO	TUR	BLR	JPN
1	Emzar Bedineishvili (GEO)	3	3	0	11	22	—	11–1	7–0 Fall	4–3
2	Yüksel Şanlı (TUR)	3	2	1	7	7	1–4 SP	—	3–0	3–1
3	Sergey Demchenko (BLR)	3	1	2	3	3	0–4 TO	0–3 PO	—	3–0
4	Takahiro Wada (JPN)	3	0	3	2	4	1–3 PP	1–3 PP	0–3 PO	—

Source: Official website

=== Knockout round ===
Round of 16
Ahmad Al-Osta (SYR)	1
Daniel Igali (CAN)	4
Dima Andronic (ROM)	0
Almaz Askarov (KGZ)	5
Yosvany Sánchez (CUB)	5
Hwang Sang-ho (KOR)	2
Emzar Bedineishvili (GEO)	10^{F}
Jens Gündling (GER)	1
Lincoln McIlravy (USA)	4
Amir Tavakkolian (IRI)	1
Zaza Zazirov (UKR)	0
Arayik Gevorgyan (ARM)	1
Xu Xuanchong (CHN)	1
Nikolaos Loizidis (GRE)	6
Ivan Diaconu (MDA)	3
Yüksel Şanlı (TUR)	5

Quarterfinals
Daniel Igali (CAN)	10
Almaz Askarov (KGZ)	0
Yosvany Sánchez (CUB)	1
Emzar Bedineishvili (GEO)	3
Lincoln McIlravy (USA)	5
Arayik Gevorgyan (ARM)	5
Nikolaos Loizidis (GRE)	4
Yüksel Şanlı (TUR)	7

Semifinals
Daniel Igali (CAN)	5
Emzar Bedineishvili (GEO)	3
Lincoln McIlravy (USA)	5
Yüksel Şanlı (TUR)	0

Final
Daniel Igali (CAN)	3
Lincoln McIlravy (USA)	2
Bronze medal match
Emzar Bedineishvili (GEO)	0
Yüksel Şanlı (TUR)	3
