= 1998 World Wrestling Championships – Men's freestyle 69 kg =

Men's freestyle 69 kg at the 1998 World Championships
- Venue: Azadi Indoor Stadium
- Dates: 9–11 September 1998
- Competitors: 27 from 27 nations

Medalists
gold medal	Arayik Gevorgyan	Armenia
silver medal	Zaza Zazirov	Ukraine
bronze medal	Lincoln McIlravy	United States

The men's freestyle 69 kilograms is a competition featured at the 1998 World Wrestling Championships, and was held at the Azadi Indoor Stadium in Tehran, Iran from 9 to 11 September 1998.

== Results ==
=== Round 1 ===
	Score	
Round of 32
Ruslan Veliyev (KAZ)	8–1 Fall	Ryusaburo Katsu (JPN)
Christoph Feyer (SUI)	3–2	Ahmet Gülhan (TUR)
Ahmad Al-Osta (SYR)	1–4	Zaza Zazirov (UKR)
Ali Akbarnejad (IRI)	6–3	Salvatore Rinella (ITA)
Sergey Demchenko (BLR)	4–0	Fatih Özbaş (GER)
Lincoln McIlravy (USA)	2–3	Arayik Gevorgyan (ARM)
Ivan Diaconu (MDA)	11–1 Fall	Chang Hsein-sheng (TPE)
Oktay Shahverdiyev (AZE)	2–4	Dima Andronic (ROM)
Mehmet Edjevit (BUL)	0–6	Velikhan Alakhverdiev (RUS)
Adiyaakhüügiin Boldsükh (MGL)	0–10	Emzar Bedineishvili (GEO)
Richard Weiss (AUS)	0–7	Igor Kupeev (UZB)
Mariusz Dąbrowski (POL)	4–1	Kim Eun-yoo (KOR)
Daniel Igali (CAN)	8–3	Almaz Askarov (KGZ)
Sandeep Kumar (IND)		Bye

=== Round 2 ===
	Score	
Round of 16
Sandeep Kumar (IND)	0–10	Ruslan Veliyev (KAZ)
Christoph Feyer (SUI)	0–4	Zaza Zazirov (UKR)
Ali Akbarnejad (IRI)	1–5	Sergey Demchenko (BLR)
Arayik Gevorgyan (ARM)	10–0	Ivan Diaconu (MDA)
Dima Andronic (ROM)	0–6	Velikhan Alakhverdiev (RUS)
Emzar Bedineishvili (GEO)	5–6	Igor Kupeev (UZB)
Mariusz Dąbrowski (POL)	2–5	Daniel Igali (CAN)
Repechage
Ryusaburo Katsu (JPN)	10–5	Ahmet Gülhan (TUR)
Ahmad Al-Osta (SYR)	3–2	Salvatore Rinella (ITA)
Fatih Özbaş (GER)	0–7	Lincoln McIlravy (USA)
Chang Hsein-sheng (TPE)	0–12	Oktay Shahverdiyev (AZE)
Mehmet Edjevit (BUL)	4–2	Adiyaakhüügiin Boldsükh (MGL)
Richard Weiss (AUS)	5–6	Kim Eun-yoo (KOR)
Almaz Askarov (KGZ)		Bye

=== Round 3 ===
	Score	
Quarterfinals
Ruslan Veliyev (KAZ)	0–10	Zaza Zazirov (UKR)
Sergey Demchenko (BLR)	1–3	Arayik Gevorgyan (ARM)
Velikhan Alakhverdiev (RUS)	1–3	Igor Kupeev (UZB)
Daniel Igali (CAN)		Bye
Repechage
Almaz Askarov (KGZ)	6–4	Ryusaburo Katsu (JPN)
Ahmad Al-Osta (SYR)	3–5	Lincoln McIlravy (USA)
Oktay Shahverdiyev (AZE)	2–12	Mehmet Edjevit (BUL)
Kim Eun-yoo (KOR)	3–2	Sandeep Kumar (IND)
Christoph Feyer (SUI)	4–1	Ali Akbarnejad (IRI)
Ivan Diaconu (MDA)	6–9	Dima Andronic (ROM)
Emzar Bedineishvili (GEO)	3–1	Mariusz Dąbrowski (POL)

=== Round 4 ===
	Score	
Repechage
Almaz Askarov (KGZ)	0–9	Lincoln McIlravy (USA)
Mehmet Edjevit (BUL)	1–5	Kim Eun-yoo (KOR)
Christoph Feyer (SUI)	5–1	Dima Andronic (ROM)
Emzar Bedineishvili (GEO)	8–1	Ruslan Veliyev (KAZ)
Sergey Demchenko (BLR)	0–4	Velikhan Alakhverdiev (RUS)

=== Round 5 ===
	Score	
Semifinals
Daniel Igali (CAN)	2–3	Zaza Zazirov (UKR)
Arayik Gevorgyan (ARM)	1–0	Igor Kupeev (UZB)
Repechage
Lincoln McIlravy (USA)	3–0	Kim Eun-yoo (KOR)
Christoph Feyer (SUI)	0–4	Emzar Bedineishvili (GEO)
Velikhan Alakhverdiev (RUS)		Bye

=== Round 6 ===
	Score	
Repechage
Velikhan Alakhverdiev (RUS)	1–3	Lincoln McIlravy (USA)
Emzar Bedineishvili (GEO)		Bye

=== Round 7 ===
	Score	
Repechage
Daniel Igali (CAN)	5–3	Emzar Bedineishvili (GEO)
Lincoln McIlravy (USA)	4–3	Igor Kupeev (UZB)

=== Finals ===
	Score	
Bronze medal match
Daniel Igali (CAN)	1–4	Lincoln McIlravy (USA)
Final
Zaza Zazirov (UKR)	0–1	Arayik Gevorgyan (ARM)
