= 1997 World Wrestling Championships – Men's freestyle 69 kg =

Men's freestyle 69 kg at the 1997 World Championships
- Venue: Yenisey Sports Palace
- Dates: 29–31 August 1997
- Competitors: 30 from 30 nations

Medalists
gold medal	Arayik Gevorgyan	Armenia
silver medal	Hwang Sang-ho	South Korea
bronze medal	Zaza Zazirov	Ukraine

The men's freestyle 69 kilograms is a competition featured at the 1997 World Wrestling Championships, and was held at the Yenisey Sports Palace in Krasnoyarsk, Russia from 29 to 31 August 1997.

== Results ==
Legend

- WO — Won by walkover

=== Round 1 ===
	Score	
Round of 32
Adam Saitiev (RUS)	10–0	Juan Suárez (VEN)
Yüksel Şanlı (TUR)	0–10	Igor Kupeev (UZB)
Hwang Sang-ho (KOR)	5–0	Jens Gündling (GER)
Elshad Allahverdiyev (AZE)	3–0 Fall	Buyandelgeriin Batbayar (MGL)
Mariusz Dąbrowski (POL)	3–4	Tzvetelin Vasilev (BUL)
Sergey Demchenko (BLR)	3–2	Ruslan Veliyev (KAZ)
Yosvany Sánchez (CUB)	10–0	Tibor Čopík (SVK)
János Fórizs (HUN)	1–7	Zaza Zazirov (UKR)
Chen Naijin (CHN)	3–10	Vaso Spasov (MKD)
Salvatore Rinella (ITA)	1–7	Lincoln McIlravy (USA)
Heikki Hirvonen (FIN)	1–11	Davoud Ghanbari (IRI)
Almaz Askarov (KGZ)	8–0 Fall	Davit Gagishvili (GEO)
Arayik Gevorgyan (ARM)	11–1	Eloy Urbano (MEX)
Ryusaburo Katsu (JPN)	16–4	Ernest Malherbe (RSA)
Richard Weiss (AUS)	10–4	Robert Betz (CAN)

=== Round 2 ===
	Score	
Round of 16
Adam Saitiev (RUS)	2–5	Igor Kupeev (UZB)
Hwang Sang-ho (KOR)	3–1	Elshad Allahverdiyev (AZE)
Tzvetelin Vasilev (BUL)	2–4	Sergey Demchenko (BLR)
Yosvany Sánchez (CUB)	0–11	Zaza Zazirov (UKR)
Vaso Spasov (MKD)	0–10	Lincoln McIlravy (USA)
Davoud Ghanbari (IRI)	1–1	Almaz Askarov (KGZ)
Arayik Gevorgyan (ARM)	7–0 Fall	Ryusaburo Katsu (JPN)
Richard Weiss (AUS)		Bye
Repechage
Juan Suárez (VEN)	0–9	Yüksel Şanlı (TUR)
Jens Gündling (GER)	5–10	Buyandelgeriin Batbayar (MGL)
Mariusz Dąbrowski (POL)	2–3	Ruslan Veliyev (KAZ)
Tibor Čopík (SVK)	0–4	János Fórizs (HUN)
Chen Naijin (CHN)	3–5	Salvatore Rinella (ITA)
Heikki Hirvonen (FIN)	0–7 Fall	Davit Gagishvili (GEO)
Eloy Urbano (MEX)	7–10	Ernest Malherbe (RSA)
Robert Betz (CAN)		Bye

=== Round 3 ===
	Score	
Quarterfinals
Richard Weiss (AUS)	3–5	Igor Kupeev (UZB)
Hwang Sang-ho (KOR)	3–0	Sergey Demchenko (BLR)
Zaza Zazirov (UKR)	9–0 Fall	Lincoln McIlravy (USA)
Davoud Ghanbari (IRI)	1–3	Arayik Gevorgyan (ARM)
Repechage
Robert Betz (CAN)	0–8	Yüksel Şanlı (TUR)
Buyandelgeriin Batbayar (MGL)	0–3 Fall	Ruslan Veliyev (KAZ)
János Fórizs (HUN)	4–5	Salvatore Rinella (ITA)
Davit Gagishvili (GEO)	9–3	Ernest Malherbe (RSA)
Adam Saitiev (RUS)	4–2	Elshad Allahverdiyev (AZE)
Tzvetelin Vasilev (BUL)	1–1 Ret	Yosvany Sánchez (CUB)
Vaso Spasov (MKD)	0–12	Almaz Askarov (KGZ)
Ryusaburo Katsu (JPN)		Bye

=== Round 4 ===
	Score	
Repechage
Ryusaburo Katsu (JPN)	1–4	Yüksel Şanlı (TUR)
Ruslan Veliyev (KAZ)	10–0	Salvatore Rinella (ITA)
Davit Gagishvili (GEO)	5–13 Fall	Adam Saitiev (RUS)
Tzvetelin Vasilev (BUL)	6–8	Almaz Askarov (KGZ)
Richard Weiss (AUS)	1–9	Sergey Demchenko (BLR)
Lincoln McIlravy (USA)	3–4	Davoud Ghanbari (IRI)

=== Round 5 ===
	Score	
Semifinals
Igor Kupeev (UZB)	3–4	Hwang Sang-ho (KOR)
Zaza Zazirov (UKR)	1–3	Arayik Gevorgyan (ARM)
Repechage
Yüksel Şanlı (TUR)	4–1	Ruslan Veliyev (KAZ)
Adam Saitiev (RUS)	3–1 Fall	Almaz Askarov (KGZ)
Sergey Demchenko (BLR)	0–2	Davoud Ghanbari (IRI)

=== Round 6 ===
	Score	
Repechage
Yüksel Şanlı (TUR)	0–10 Fall	Adam Saitiev (RUS)
Davoud Ghanbari (IRI)		Bye

=== Round 7 ===
	Score	
Repechage
Igor Kupeev (UZB)	5–1	Davoud Ghanbari (IRI)
Adam Saitiev (RUS)	2–4	Zaza Zazirov (UKR)

=== Finals ===
	Score	
5th place match
Davoud Ghanbari (IRI)	WO	Adam Saitiev (RUS)
Bronze medal match
Igor Kupeev (UZB)	0–4	Zaza Zazirov (UKR)
Final
Hwang Sang-ho (KOR)	0–3	Arayik Gevorgyan (ARM)
