= Canada at the 2000 Summer Olympics =

- IOC code: CAN
- NOC: Canadian Olympic Committee
- Website: www.olympic.ca (in English and French)

in Sydney
- Competitors: 294 (150 men, 144 women) in 29 sports
- Flag bearer: Caroline Brunet
- Medals Ranked 24th: Gold 3 Silver 3 Bronze 8 Total 14

Summer Olympics appearances (overview)
- ~~1900~~; 1904; 1908; 1912; 1920; 1924; 1928; 1932; 1936; 1948; 1952; 1956; 1960; 1964; 1968; 1972; 1976; 1980; 1984; 1988; 1992; 1996; 2000; 2004; 2008; 2012; 2016; 2020; 2024; 2028

Other related appearances
- 1906 Intercalated Games

Canada competed at the 2000 Summer Olympics in Sydney, Australia, held from 15 September to 1 October 2000. 294 competitors, 150 men, and 144 women, took part in 175 events in 29 sports.

The final days of the Olympics for Canada were somewhat overshadowed by the death of Pierre Trudeau, the country's 15th prime minister. When the closing ceremonies took place, he was lying in state, allowing Canadians to travel to Ottawa to pay their respects.

Olympic scholar Bob Barney felt that Canada needed to specialize in the Olympics, rather than trying to be compete at too many sports. He also that felt that Canada's medal count at the 2000 Summer Olympics, was due to a lack of government funding, and poor planning to develop high performance athletes.

== Medallists ==
Medal	Name	Sport	Event	Date
Gold	Simon Whitfield	Triathlon	Men's individual	17 September
Gold	Daniel Igali	Wrestling	Men's freestyle 69 kg	1 October
Gold	Sébastien Lareau; Daniel Nestor	Tennis	Men's doubles	27 September
Silver	Caroline Brunet	Canoeing	Women's K-1 500 metres	1 October
Silver	Nicolas Gill	Judo	Men's 100 kg	21 September
Silver	Anne Montminy; Émilie Heymans	Diving	Women's synchronized 10 metre platform	28 September
Bronze	Steve Giles	Canoeing	Men's C-1 1000 metres	30 September
Bronze	Anne Montminy	Diving	Women's 10 metre platform	24 September
Bronze	Mathieu Turgeon	Gymnastics	Men's trampoline	23 September
Bronze	Karen Cockburn	Gymnastics	Women's trampoline	22 September
Bronze	Buffy Alexander; Laryssa Biesenthal; Heather Davis; Alison Korn; Theresa Luke; Heather McDermid; Emma Robinson; Lesley Thompson; Dorota Urbaniak	Rowing	Women's eight	24 September
Bronze	Curtis Myden	Swimming	Men's 400 metre individual medley	17 September
Bronze	Lyne Beaumont; Claire Carver-Dias; Erin Chan; Catherine Garceau; Fanny Létourneau; Kirstin Normand; Jacinthe Taillon; Reidun Tatham; Jessica Chase	Synchronized Swimming	Women's team	29 September
Bronze	Dominique Bosshart	Taekwondo	Women's +67 kg	30 September

Medals by sport
Sport	1st place, gold medalist(s)	2nd place, silver medalist(s)	3rd place, bronze medalist(s)	Total
Tennis	1	0	0	1
Triathlon	1	0	0	1
Wrestling	1	0	0	1
Canoeing	0	1	1	2
Diving	0	1	1	2
Judo	0	1	0	1
Gymnastics	0	0	2	2
Rowing	0	0	1	1
Swimming	0	0	1	1
Synchronized swimming	0	0	1	1
Taekwondo	0	0	1	1
Total	3	3	8	14

== Competitors ==
The following is the list of number of competitors in the Games.

Sport	Men	Women	Total
Archery	1	0	1
Athletics	22	14	37
Badminton	3	3	6
Basketball	12	12	24
Boxing	7	–	7
Canoeing	9	7	16
Cycling	7	8	15
Diving	3	4	7
Equestrian	5	1	6
Fencing	1	3	4
Field hockey	16	0	16
Gymnastics	3	8	11
Judo	2	4	6
Rowing	18	12	30
Sailing	7	2	9
Shooting	4	5	9
Softball	–	15	15
Swimming	16	14	30
Synchronized swimming	–	8	8
Table tennis	2	4	6
Taekwondo	0	1	1
Tennis	2	2	4
Triathlon	1	3	4
Volleyball	4	0	4
Water polo	0	13	13
Weightlifting	1	1	2
Wrestling	4	–	4
Total	150	144	294

== Archery ==
Canada's archery squad in Sydney consisted of only one man, veteran Rob Rusnov. He lost his first match.

Athlete	Event	Ranking round		Round of 64	Round of 32	Round of 16	Quarterfinals	Semifinals	Final / BM	
Athlete	Event	Score	Seed	Opposition Score	Opposition Score	Opposition Score	Opposition Score	Opposition Score	Opposition Score	Rank
Rob Rusnov	Men's individual	622	37	Eriksson (SWE) (28); L 155–161	did not advance					

== Athletics ==
Key

- Note–Ranks given for track events are within the athlete's heat only
- Q = Qualified for the next round
- q = Qualified for the next round as a fastest loser or, in field events, by position without achieving the qualifying target
- NR = National record
- N/A = Round not applicable for the event
- Bye = Athlete not required to compete in round

Men
Track & road events

Athlete	Event	Round 1		Round 2		Semifinal		Final	
Athlete	Event	Result	Rank	Result	Rank	Result	Rank	Result	Rank
Donovan Bailey	100 m	10.39	3 Q	11.36	8	did not advance			
Nicolas Macrozonaris	100 m	10.45	5	did not advance					
Bruny Surin	100 m	10.41	4 q	10.20	3 Q	50.94	8	did not advance	
Pierre Browne	200 m	21.28	6	did not advance					
Zach Whitmarsh	800 m	1:48.42	4	—N/a		did not advance			
Kevin Sullivan	1500 m	3:40.80	4 Q	—N/a		3:39.66	2 Q	3:35.50	5
Sean Kaley	10000 m	28:36.07	12	—N/a		did not advance			
Jeff Schiebler	10000 m	28:30.46	15	—N/a		did not advance			
Adrian Woodley	110 m hurdles	13.71	4 Q	14.04	6	did not advance			
Joël Bourgeois	3000 m steeplechase	8:28.07	17	did not advance					
Pierre Browne; Glenroy Gilbert; Nicolas Macrozonaris; Brand McCuaig; Adrian Woodley	4 × 100 m relay	39.26	3 q	—N/a		38.92	6	did not advance	
Bruce Deacon	Marathon	—N/a						2:21:38	44
Tim Berrett	20 km walk	—N/a						1:25:29	26
Arturo Huerta	20 km walk	—N/a						1:25:24	24
Tim Berrett	50 km walk	—N/a						DSQ	
Arturo Huerta	50 km walk	—N/a						DSQ	

Field events

Athlete	Event	Qualifying		Final	
Athlete	Event	Result	Rank	Result	Rank
Bradley Snyder	Shot put	19.77	7	did not advance	
Jason Tunks	Discus throw	64.40	2 Q	65.80	6
Jason Gervais	Discus throw	NM	—	did not advance	
Richard Duncan	Long jump	7.60	16	did not advance	
Ian Lowe	Long jump	7.51	20	did not advance	
Mark Boswell	High jump	2.27	6 Q	2.32	6
Kwaku Boateng	High jump	2.27	4 Q	2.25	12

Women
Track & road events

Athlete	Event	Round 1		Round 2		Semifinal		Final	
Athlete	Event	Result	Rank	Result	Rank	Result	Rank	Result	Rank
Martha Adusei	100 m	11.82	6	did not advance					
Esi Benyarku	100 m	11.55	4	did not advance					
Ladonna Antoine	400 m	51.78	1 Q	50.92	2 Q	51.26	5	did not advance	
Foy Williams	400 m	52.94	4 q	52.68	8	did not advance			
Leah Pells	1500 m	DNF		did not advance					
Tina Connelly	10000 m	34:46.04	19	—N/a		did not advance			
Carole Montgomery	10000 m	DNS		—N/a		did not advance			
Katie Anderson	100 m hurdles	12.82	1 Q	DNF		did not advance			
Perdita Felicien	100 m hurdles	13.21	6	did not advance					
Karlene Haughton	400 m hurdles	DNS		—N/a		did not advance			
Martha Adusei; Esi Benyarku; Tara Perry; Atia Weekes	4 × 100 m relay	44.08	6	—N/a		did not advance			
Ladonna Antoine; Samantha George; Karlene Haughton; Foy Williams	4 × 400 m relay	3:27.36	5	—N/a				did not advance	
Janice McCaffrey	20 km walk	—N/a						DSQ	

Field events

Athlete	Event	Qualifying		Final	
Athlete	Event	Result	Rank	Result	Rank
Michelle Fournier	Hammer throw	59.15	13	did not advance	

== Badminton ==
Men's singles

- Mike Beres
  - Round of 64: bye
  - Round of 32: lost to Kevin Han of United States

Men's doubles

- Bryan Moody, Brent Olynyk
  - Round of 32: defeated Zhang Jun, Zhang Wei of China
  - Round of 16: lost to Jesper Larsen, Jens Eriksen of Denmark

Women's singles

- Kara Solmundson
  - Round of 64: lost to Lidya Djaelawijaya of Indonesia
- Robbyn Hermitage
  - Round of 64: lost to Rayoni Head of Australia
- Milaine Cloutier
  - Round of 64: bye
  - Round of 32: lost to Kim Ji-hyun of Korea

Women's doubles

- Milaine Cloutier, Robbyn Hermitage
  - Round of 32: defeated Rhonda Cator, Amanda Hardy of Australia
  - Round of 16: lost to Joanne Goode, Donna Kellogg of Great Britain

Mixed doubles

- Milaine Cloutier, Bryan Moody
  - Round of 32: lost to Nicol Pitro, Michael Keck of Germany
- Robbyn Hermitage, Brent Olynyk
  - Round of 32: lost to Joanne Goode, Simon Archer of Great Britain
- Kara Solmundson, Mike Beres
  - Round of 32: defeated Marie-Helene Valerie Pierre, Stephan Beeharry of Mauritius
  - Round of 16: lost to Michael Sogaard, Rikke Olsen of Denmark

== Basketball ==
=== Men's team competition ===
- Preliminary round
  - Defeated Australia (101–90)
  - Defeated Angola (99–54)
  - Defeated Spain (91–77)
  - Lost to Russia (59–77)
  - Defeated Yugoslavia (83–75)
- Quarterfinals
  - Lost to France (63–68)
- Classification match
  - 7th/8th place – defeated Russia (86–83) → 7th place
- Team roster
  - Rowan Barrett
  - David Daniels
  - Greg Francis
  - Pete Guarasci
  - Sherman Hamilton
  - Eric Hinrichsen
  - Todd MacCulloch
  - Andrew Mavis
  - Michael Meeks
  - Steve Nash
  - Greg Newton
  - Shawn Swords

=== Women's team competition ===
- Preliminary round
  - Lost to Australia (46–78)
  - Defeated Senegal (41–62)
  - Lost to France (58–70)
  - Lost to Slovakia (56–68)
  - Defeated Brazil (61–60)
- Classification match
  - 9th/10th place – lost to Cuba (58–67) → 10th place
- Team roster
  - Cori-Lyn Blakebrough
  - Carolin Bouchard
  - Kelly Boucher
  - Claudia Brassard-Riebesehl
  - Stacey Dales-Schuman
  - Michelle Hendry
  - Nikki Johnson
  - Karla Karch
  - Teresa Kleindienst
  - Joy McNichol
  - Dianne Norman
  - Tammy Sutton-Brown

== Beach volleyball ==
- John Child and Mark Heese – 5th place (tied)
- Jody Holden and Conrad Leinemann – 9th place (tied)

== Boxing ==
Men's flyweight (51 kg)

- Andrew Kooner
  - Round 1 – defeated Nacer Keddam of Algeria
  - Round 2 – lost to Wijan Ponlid of Thailand (→ did not advance)

Men's light welterweight (63.5 kg)

- Michael Strange
  - Round 1 – lost to Nurhan Suleymanoglu of Turkey (→ did not advance)

Men's light middleweight (71 kg)

- Scott MacIntosh
  - Round 1 – defeated Sakio Bika Mbah of CMR
  - Round 2 – lost to Jermain Taylor of United States (→ did not advance)

Men's middleweight (75 kg)

- Donald Grant Orr
  - Round 1 – lost to Jitender Kumar of India (→ did not advance)

Men's light heavyweight (81 kg)

- Troy Amos-Ross
  - Round 1 – bye
  - Round 2 – lost to Jegbefumere Albert of Nigeria (→ did not advance)

Men's heavyweight (91 kg)

- Mark Simmons
  - Round 1 – bye
  - Round 2 – defeated Rouhollah Hosseini of Iran
  - Quarterfinal – lost to Sebastian Kober of Germany (→ did not advance)

Men's super heavyweight (+ 91 kg)

- Art Binkowski
  - Round 1 – bye
  - Round 2 – defeated Michael Macaque of Mauritius
  - Quarterfinal – lost to Rustam Saidov of Uzbekistan (→ did not advance)

== Canoeing ==
=== Flatwater ===
==== Men's competition ====
Men's kayak singles 500 m

- Mihai Apostol
  - Qualifying heat – 01:42.562 (→ did not advance)

Men's kayak singles 1000 m

- Mihai Apostol
  - Qualifying heat – 03:47.679 (→ did not advance)

Men's canoe singles 500 m

- Maxime Boilard
  - Qualifying heat – 01:52.764
  - Semifinal – 01:52.071
  - Final – 02:29.259 (→ 4th place)

Men's canoe singles 1000 m

- Steve Giles
  - Qualifying heat – 03:55.396
  - Semifinal – bye
  - Final – 03:56.437 (→ Bronze medal)

Men's canoe doubles 500 m

- Tamás Buday, Attila Buday
  - Qualifying heat – 01:46.557 (→ did not advance)

Men's canoe doubles 1,000 m

- Tamás Buday, Attila Buday
  - Qualifying heat – 03:41.075
  - Semifinal – 03:44.358
  - Final – 03:48.017 (→ 7th place)

==== Women's competition ====
Women's kayak singles 500 m

- Caroline Brunet
  - Qualifying heat – 01:51.558
  - Semifinal – bye
  - Final – 02:14.646 (→ Silver medal)

Women's kayak doubles 500 m

- Caroline Brunet, Karen Furneaux
  - Qualifying heat – 01:44.476
  - Semifinal – bye
  - Final – 02:01.046 (→ 5th place)

Women's kayak fours 500 m

- Maria-Josee Gibeau-Ouimet, Kamina Jain, Carrie Lightbound, Julia Rivard
  - Qualifying heat – 01:38.209
  - Semifinal – 01:38.340
  - Final – 01:39.566 (→ 9th place)

=== Slalom ===
==== Men's competition ====
Men's kayak singles

- David Ford
  - Qualifying – 323.58 (→ did not advance)

Men's canoe singles

- James Cartwright-Garland
  - Qualifying – 297.66 (→ did not advance)

Men's canoe doubles

- Benoît Gauthier, Tyler Lawlor
  - Qualifying – 311.11 (→ did not advance)

==== Women's competition ====
Women's kayak singles

- Margaret Langford
  - Qualifying – 314.51
  - Final – 274.14 (→ 13th place)

== Cycling ==
=== Cross country mountain bike ===
Men's cross country mountain bike

- Geoff Kabush
  - Final – 2:14:00.66 (→ 9th place)
- Roland Green
  - Final – 2:15:18.85 (→ 14th place)

Women's mountain bike

- Alison Sydor
  - Final – 1:52:19.32 (→ 5th place)
- Chrissy Redden
  - Final – 1:54:07.38 (→ 8th place)
- Lesley Tomlinson
  - Final – 2:00:44.08 (→ 19th place)

=== Road cycling ===
==== Men's competition ====
Men's individual time trial

- Eric Wohlberg
  - Final – 1:00:34 (→ 20th place)

Men's road race

- Gordon Fraser
  - Final – 5:30:46 (→ 16th place)
- Eric Wohlberg
  - Final – 5:30:46 (→ 72nd place)
- Czeslaw Lukaszewicz
  - Final – DNF
- Brian Walton
  - Final – DNF

==== Women's competition ====
Women's individual time trial

- Clara Hughes
  - Final – 0:43:12 (→ 6th place)
- Genevieve Jeanson
  - Final – 0:44:32 (→ 15th place)

Women's road race

- Genevieve Jeanson
  - Final – 3:06:31 (→ 11th place)
- Lyne Bessette
  - Final – 3:06:31 (→ 22nd place)
- Clara Hughes
  - Final – 3:16:49 (→ 43rd place)

=== Track cycling ===
==== Men's competition ====
Men's 1 km time trial

- Jim Fisher
  - Final – 01:05.835 (→ 12th place)

Men's point race

- Brian Walton
  - Points – 1
  - Laps Down – 1 (→ 9th place)

==== Women's competition ====
Women's sprint

- Tanya Dubnicoff
  - Qualifying – 11.494
  - 1/8 finals – defeated Kathrin Freitag of Germany
  - Quarterfinal – lost to Iryna Yanovych of Ukraine
  - Finals 5–8 – (→ 7th place)

Women's 500 m time trial

- Tanya Dubnicoff
  - Final – 35.486 (→ 8th place)
- Lori-Anne Muenzer
  - Final – 35.846 (→ 13th place)

== Diving ==
Canada won two diving medals at the 2000 Sydney Olympics – one silver and one bronze. Anne Montminy won the first ever platform diving medal for Canada.

Men's 3-metre springboard

- Jeff Liberty
  - Preliminary – 375.06 (→ did not advance, 19th place)

Men's 10-metre platform

- Alexandre Despatie
  - Preliminary – 436.86
  - Semi-final – 188.28 – 625.14
  - Final – 464.07 – 652.35 (→ 4th place)

Men's 10-metre platform

- Christopher Kalec
  - Preliminary – 388.50
  - Semi-final – 175.02 – 563.52 (→ did not advance, 17th place)

Women's 3-metre springboard

- Eryn Bulmer
  - Preliminary – 258.93 (→ did not advance, 20th place)

Women's 3-metre springboard

- Blythe Hartley
  - Preliminary – 295.98
  - Semi-final – 219 – 514.98
  - Final – 304.05 – 523.05 (→ 10th place)

Women's 10-metre platform

- Anne Montminy
  - Preliminary – 339.93
  - Semi-final – 185.88 – 525.81
  - Final – 354.27 – 540.15 (→ Bronze medal)

Women's 10-metre platform

- Émilie Heymans
  - Preliminary – 333.78
  - Semi-final – 182.64 – 516.42
  - Final – 329.28 – 511.92 (→ 5th place)

Women's synchronized 3-metre springboard

- Eryn Bulmer and Blythe Hartley
  - Final – 279.00 (→ 5th place)

Women's synchronized 10-metre platform

- Émilie Heymans and Anne Montminy
  - Final – 312.03 (→ Silver medal)

== Fencing ==
Four fencers, one man and three women, represented Canada in 2000.

Men's épée

- Laurie Shong

Women's foil

- Julie Mahoney
- Jujie Luan

Women's team foil

- Sherraine Schalm-MacKay, Julie Mahoney, Jujie Luan

Women's épée

- Sherraine Schalm-MacKay

== Gymnastics ==
=== Artistic ===
Men

Individual finals

Athlete	Event	Qualification								Final							
Athlete	Event	Apparatus						Total	Rank	Apparatus						Total	Rank
Athlete	Event	F	PH	R	V	PB	HB	Total	Rank	F	PH	R	V	PB	HB	Total	Rank
Kyle Shewfelt	Qualification	9.575	—N/a		9.575	—N/a		19.150	89	did not advance							
Sasha Jeltkov	Qualification	8.037	—N/a				9.662	17.699	92	did not advance							

Women

Team

Athlete	Event	Qualification						Final					
Athlete	Event	Apparatus				Total	Rank	Apparatus				Total	Rank
Athlete	Event	V	UB	BB	F	Total	Rank	V	UB	BB	F	Total	Rank
Yvonne Tousek	Team	9.131	9.662	9.537	9.550	37.880	15 Q	did not advance					
Kate Richardson	Team	9.287	9.612	9.075	9.362	37.336	28 Q	did not advance					
Lise Leveille	Team	8.912	9.400	9.425	8.587	36.324	51	did not advance					
Julie Beaulieu	Team	9.093	9.587	9.412	7.912	36.004	52	did not advance					
Michelle Conway	Team	9.143	9.450	—N/a	9.612	28.205	68	did not advance					
Crystal Gilmore	Team	—N/a		9.437	—N/a	9.437	95	did not advance					
Total	Team	36.654	38.311	37.811	37.111	149.887	9	did not advance					

Individual finals

Athlete	Event	Apparatus				Total	Rank
Athlete	Event	V	UB	BB	F	Total	Rank
Yvonne Tousek	All-around	9.081	9.150	9.225	8.825	36.281	32
Kate Richardson	All-around	9.281	9.662	9.337	9.250	37.530	15

=== Trampoline ===
Athlete	Event	Qualifying		Final	
Athlete	Event	Score	Rank	Score	Rank
Mathieu Turgeon	Men's	66.10	6 Q	39.10	3rd place, bronze medalist(s)
Karen Cockburn	Women's	65.00	4 Q	37.40	3rd place, bronze medalist(s)

== Field hockey ==
=== Men's team competition ===
- Preliminary round (group A)
  - Canada – Pakistan 2–2
  - Canada – Germany 1–2
  - Canada – Netherlands 2–5
  - Canada – Great Britain 1–1
  - Canada – Malaysia 1–1
- Classification matches
  - 9th–12th place: Canada – Poland 3–2
  - 9th/10th place: Canada – Spain 0–3 (→ Tenth place)
- Team roster
  - Hari Kant (gk)
  - Mike Mahood (gk)
  - Ian Bird
  - Alan Brahmst
  - Robin D'Abreo
  - Ronnie Jagday
  - Ravi Kahlon
  - Peter Milkovich (c)
  - Bindi Kullar
  - Rob Short
  - Sean Campbell
  - Chris Gifford
  - Andrew Griffiths
  - Ken Pereira
  - Scott Mosher
  - Paul Wettlaufer
- Head Coach: Shiaz Virjee

== Judo ==
Men

Athlete	Event	First round	Round of 32	Round of 16	Quarterfinal	Semifinals	Repechage 1	Repechage 2	Repechage 3	Final / BM	
Athlete	Event	Opposition Result	Opposition Result	Opposition Result	Opposition Result	Opposition Result	Opposition Result	Opposition Result	Opposition Result	Opposition Result	Rank
Keith Morgan	90 kg	—N/a	Ivers (AUS); W	Salimov (AZE); W	Raphael (MRI); W	Huizinga (NED); L	Bye			Mashurenko (UKR); L	5
Nicolas Gill	100 kg	—N/a	Sonnemans (NED); W	Soares (POR); W	Jikurauli (GEO); W	Traineau (FRA); W	Bye			Inoue (JPN); L	2nd place, silver medalist(s)

Women

Athlete	Event	Round of 32	Round of 16	Quarterfinal	Semifinals	Repechage 1	Repechage 2	Repechage 3	Final / BM	
Athlete	Event	Opposition Result	Opposition Result	Opposition Result	Opposition Result	Opposition Result	Opposition Result	Opposition Result	Opposition Result	Rank
Luce Baillargeon	52 kg	Narazaki (JPN); L	did not advance							
Michelle Buckingham	57 kg	Ferreira (BRA); L	did not advance							
Sophie Roberge	63 kg	Bye	Vandenhende (FRA); L	did not advance		Jung (KOR); L	did not advance			

== Sailing ==
Nine people competed for Canada in the sailing competition at the Olympics in six events.

Men's single-handed dinghy (Finn)

- Richard Clarke
  - Race 1 – 14
  - Race 2 – (20)
  - Race 3 – 8
  - Race 4 – 14
  - Race 5 – 16
  - Race 6 – 7
  - Race 7 – 13
  - Race 8 – 14
  - Race 9 – 20
  - Race 10 – 8
  - Race 11 – (26) OCS
  - Final – 114 (→ 17th place)

Men's Laser

- Marty Essig
  - Race 1 – 27
  - Race 2 – 16
  - Race 3 – 7
  - Race 4 – (35)
  - Race 5 – 25
  - Race 6 – 13
  - Race 7 – 23
  - Race 8 – (44) OCS
  - Race 9 – 26
  - Race 10 – 18
  - Race 11 – 21
  - Final – 176 (→ 24th place)

Men's two-handed keelboat (Star)

- Ross Macdonald and Kai Bjorn
  - Race 1 – 7
  - Race 2 – 5
  - Race 3 – 13
  - Race 4 – 4
  - Race 5 – (14)
  - Race 6 – 5
  - Race 7 – 3
  - Race 8 – (17) OCS
  - Race 9 – 5
  - Race 10 – 5
  - Race 11 – 1
  - Final – 48 (→ 5th place)

Men's three-handed keelboat (Soling)

- Bill Abbott Jr., Matt Abbott and Brad Boston
  - 13th place – did not advance to round robin round

Women's Mistral

- Caroll-Ann Alie
  - Race 1 – 15
  - Race 2 – (21)
  - Race 3 – 16
  - Race 4 – (27)
  - Race 5 – 12
  - Race 6 – 17
  - Race 7 – 18
  - Race 8 – 20
  - Race 9 – 11
  - Race 10 – 15
  - Race 11 – 15
  - Final – 139 (→ 17th place)

Women's single-handed dinghy (Europe)

- Beth Calkin
  - Race 1 – 17
  - Race 2 – 4
  - Race 3 – (24)
  - Race 4 – 18
  - Race 5 – 3
  - Race 6 – (25)
  - Race 7 – 1
  - Race 8 – 14
  - Race 9 – 4
  - Race 10 – 20
  - Race 11 – 4
  - Final – 85 (→ 11th place)

== Softball ==
=== Women's team competition ===
- Preliminary round robin
  - Lost to United States (0–6)
  - Lost to New Zealand (2–3)
  - Lost to Australia (0–1)
  - Defeated Italy (7–1)
  - Lost to Japan (3–4)
  - Lost to Cuba (1–2)
  - Lost to PR China (0–1) → 8th place
- Team roster
  - Colleen Thorburn-Smith
  - Kristy Odamura
  - Jackie Lance
  - Cherene Hiesl-Boyer
  - Denise Carriere
  - Erin Woods
  - Heather Newsham
  - Jacki Nichol
  - Lesley Attwell
  - Nathalie Fradette
  - Sommer West
  - Vicky Bastarache
  - Hayley Wickenheiser
  - Meaggan Wilton
  - Sandy Newsham

== Swimming ==
Men's 50 m freestyle

- Craig Hutchison
  - Preliminary heat – DSQ (→ did not advance)

Men's 100 m freestyle

- Yannick Lupien
  - Preliminary heat – 50.62 (→ did not advance)
- Craig Hutchison
  - Preliminary heat – 50.9 (→ did not advance)

Men's 200 m freestyle

- Rick Say
  - Preliminary heat – 1:48.62
  - Semi-final – 1:48.50
  - Final – 1:48.76 (→ 7th place)
- Mark Johnston
  - Preliminary heat – 1:50.92 (→ did not advance)

Men's 400 m freestyle

- Rick Say
  - Preliminary heat – 03:52.72 (did not advance)
- Mark Johnston
  - Preliminary heat – 03:54.99 (→ did not advance)

Men's 1500 m freestyle

- Andrew Hurd
  - Preliminary heat – 15:30.98 (→ did not advance)
- Tim Peterson
  - Preliminary heat – 15:34.94 (→ did not advance)

Men's 100 m butterfly

- Mike Mintenko
  - Preliminary heat – 52.9
  - Semi-final – 53
  - Final – 52.58 (→ 5th place)
- Shamek Pietucha
  - Preliminary heat – 54.14 (→ did not advance)

Men's 200 m butterfly

- Shamek Pietucha
  - Preliminary heat – 01:59.59 (→ did not advance)

Men's 100 m breaststroke

- Morgan Knabe
  - Preliminary heat – 01:01.81
  - Semi-final – 01:01.70
  - Final – 01:01.58 (→ 6th place)

Men's 200 m breaststroke

- Morgan Knabe
  - Preliminary heat – 02:14.18
  - Semi-final – 02:14.01 (→ did not advance)

Men's 100 m backstroke

- Chris Renaud
  - Preliminary heat – 55.85
  - Semi-final – 55.7 (→ did not advance)
- Mark Versfeld
  - Preliminary heat – 56.5 (→ did not advance)

Men's 200 m backstroke

- Chris Renaud
  - Preliminary heat – 02:00.51
  - Semi-final – 02:01.19 (→ did not advance)
- Dustin Hersee
  - Preliminary heat – 02:01.34 (→ did not advance)

Men's 200 m individual medley

- Curtis Myden
  - Preliminary heat – 02:21.78
  - Semi-final – 02:01.99 (→ did not advance)
- Brian Johns
  - Preliminary heat – 02:03.12
  - Semi-final – 02:02.92 (→ did not advance)

Men's 400 m individual medley

- Curtis Myden
  - Preliminary heat – 04:16.55
  - Final – 04:15.33 → Bronze medal
- Owen von Richter
  - Preliminary heat – 04:25.70 (→ did not advance)

Men's 4 × 100 m freestyle relay

- Craig Hutchison, Robbie Taylor, Rick Say, and Yannick Lupien
  - Preliminary heat – 03:21.98 (→ did not advance)

Men's 4 × 200 m freestyle relay

- Mark Johnston, Brian Johns, Mike Mintenko, and Rick Say
  - Preliminary heat – 07:21.45
- Mark Johnston, Mike Mintenko, Rick Say, and Yannick Lupien
  - Final – 07:21.92 (→ 7th place)

Men's 4 × 100 m medley relay

- Chris Renaud, Morgan Knabe, Shamek Pietucha, and Yannick Lupien
  - Preliminary heat – 03:40.56
- Chris Renaud, Morgan Knabe, Mike Mintenko, and Craig Hutchison
  - Final – 03:39.88 (→ 6th place)

Women's 50 m freestyle

- Nadine Rolland
  - Preliminary heat – 26.04 (→ did not advance)
- Jenna Gresdal
  - Preliminary heat – 26.79 (→ did not advance)

Women's 100 m freestyle

- Laura Nicholls
  - Preliminary heat – 56.3
  - Semi-final – 55.94 (→ did not advance)
- Marianne Limpert
  - Preliminary heat – DNS (→ did not advance)

Women's 200 m freestyle

- Jessica Deglau
  - Preliminary heat – 02:01.42 (→ did not advance)
- Laura Nicholls
  - Preliminary heat – 02:02.69 (→ did not advance)

Women's 400 m freestyle

- Karine Legault
  - Preliminary heat – 04:15.55 (→ did not advance)

Women's 800 m freestyle

- Karine Legault
  - Preliminary heat – 08:43.56 (→ did not advance)
- Joanne Malar
  - Preliminary heat – DNS (→ did not advance)

Women's 100 m butterfly

- Jen Button
  - Preliminary heat – 01:00.83 (→ did not advance)
- Jessica Deglau
  - Preliminary heat – 01:00.97 (→ did not advance)

Women's 200 m butterfly

- Jen Button
  - Preliminary heat – 02:11.74 (→ did not advance)
- Jessica Deglau
  - Preliminary heat – 02:12.86 (→ did not advance)

Women's 100 m breaststroke

- Christin Petelski
  - Preliminary heat – 01:09.57
  - Semi-final – 01:09.54 (→ did not advance)
- Rhiannon Leier
  - Preliminary heat – 01:09.68
  - Semi-final – 01:09.63 (→ did not advance)

Women's 200 m breaststroke

- Christin Petelski
  - Preliminary heat – 02:29.11
  - Semi-final – 02:29.43 (→ did not advance)

Women's 100 m backstroke

- Kelly Stefanyshyn
  - Preliminary heat – 01:02.78
  - Semi-final – 01:02.35 (→ did not advance)
- Michelle Lischinsky
  - Preliminary heat – 01:02.89
  - Semi-final – 01:02.55 (→ did not advance)

Women's 200 m backstroke

- Kelly Stefanyshyn
  - Preliminary heat – 02:14.28
  - Semi-final – 02:13.39
  - Final – 2:14.57 (→ 8th place)

Women's 200 m individual medley

- Joanne Malar
  - Preliminary heat – 02:13.92
  - Semi-final – 02:13.59
  - Final – 02:13.70 (→ 5th place)

Women's 200 m individual medley

- Marianne Limpert
  - Preliminary heat – 02:15.07
  - Semi-final – 02:13.90
  - Final – 02:13.44 (→ 4th place)

Women's 400 m individual medley

- Joanne Malar
  - Preliminary heat – 04:42.65
  - Final – 04:45.17 (→ 7th place)

Women's 4 × 100 m freestyle relay

- Marianne Limpert, Shannon Shakespeare, Jessica Deglau, and Laura Nicholls
  - Preliminary heat – 03:43.82
  - Final – 03:42.92 (→ 7th place)

Women's 4 × 200 m freestyle relay

- Jessica Deglau, Shannon Shakespeare, Katie Brambley, and Jen Button
  - Preliminary heat – 08:07.12
- Marianne Limpert, Shannon Shakespeare, Joanne Malar, and Jessica Deglau
  - Final – 08:02.65 (→ 5th place)

Women's 4 × 100 m medley relay

- Michelle Lischinsky, Christin Petelski, Jen Button, and Laura Nicholls
  - Preliminary heat – 04:08.47
- Kelly Stefanyshyn, Christin Petelski, Jen Button, and Marianne Limpert
  - Final – 04:07.55 (→ 6th place)

== Synchronized swimming ==
Athlete	Event	Technical routine		Free routine (preliminary)			Free routine (final)		
Athlete	Event	Points	Rank	Points	Total (technical + free)	Rank	Points	Total (technical + free)	Rank
Claire Carver-Dias; Fanny Létourneau	Duet	33.670	5	62.704	96.374	5 Q	62.314	95.984	5
Lyne Beaumont; Claire Carver-Dias; Erin Chan; Catherine Garceau; Fanny Létourneau; Kirstin Normand; Jacinthe Taillon; Reidun Tatham; Jessica Chase	Team	33.787	3	—N/a			63.570	97.357	3rd place, bronze medalist(s)

== Triathlon ==
After ending the second phase of the triathlon in twenty-fourth place following a crash in the cycling portion of the event, Canada's only male triathlete at the first Olympic triathlon, Simon Whitfield, had by far the best run of any athlete present. He passed all twenty-three competitors that had been in front of him and finished over 13.5 seconds before the next triathlete to claim the gold medal. Canada's women did not fare so well, with two of them placing in the 30s and the third not finishing.

Athlete	Event	Swim	Cycle	Run	Total^{*}	Rank
Simon Whitfield	Men's	18:18.09	59:12.20	30:53.73	1:48:24.02	1st place, gold medalist(s)
Isabelle Turcotte Baird	Women's	20:59.98	1:08:37.10	38:52.41	2:08:29.49	31
Sharon Donnelly	Women's	20:32.48	1:14:41.50	39:21.61	2:14:35.59	38
Carol Montgomery	Women's	did not finish				

- * Including Transition 1 (swimming-to-cycling) and T2 (cycling-to-running), roughly a minute.

== Water polo ==
=== Women's team competition ===
Pos	Team	Pld	W	D	L	GF	GA	GD	Pts	Qualification
1	Australia (H)	5	4	0	1	35	20	+15	8	Semi Finals
2	United States	5	3	1	1	36	30	+6	7	Semi Finals
3	Netherlands	5	3	0	2	27	26	+1	6	Semi Finals
4	Russia	5	2	1	2	36	29	+7	5	Semi Finals
5	Canada	5	1	2	2	33	34	−1	4	
6	Kazakhstan	5	0	0	5	23	51	−28	0	

Source: LA84
Rules for classification: 1) Points; 2) Head-to-head points; 3) Head-to-head goal difference; 4) Head-to-head goals scored; 5) Goal difference.
(H) Hosts
- Preliminary round robin

16 September 2000; 18:00	Report	Canada	7–7	Russia	Ryde Aquatic Centre; Referees: Ahmet Erhan Tulga (TUR), Patrick Clemenson (FRA)
16 September 2000; 18:00	Report	Score by quarters: 2-3, 0-1, 2-2, 3-1			Ryde Aquatic Centre; Referees: Ahmet Erhan Tulga (TUR), Patrick Clemenson (FRA)
16 September 2000; 18:00	Report	Dow 3	Goals	two players 2	Ryde Aquatic Centre; Referees: Ahmet Erhan Tulga (TUR), Patrick Clemenson (FRA)

17 September 2000; 18:00	Report	United States	8–8	Canada	Ryde Aquatic Centre; Referees: Boris Margeta (SLO), Vlastimil Kratochvil (SVK)
17 September 2000; 18:00	Report	Score by quarters: 3-3, 2-3, 0-2, 3-0			Ryde Aquatic Centre; Referees: Boris Margeta (SLO), Vlastimil Kratochvil (SVK)
17 September 2000; 18:00	Report	Beauregard 3	Goals	Horn-Miller 3	Ryde Aquatic Centre; Referees: Boris Margeta (SLO), Vlastimil Kratochvil (SVK)

18 September 2000; 19:15	Report	Canada	10–3	Kazakhstan	Ryde Aquatic Centre; Referees: Rolf Ludecke (GER), Vahid Moradi (IRI)
18 September 2000; 19:15	Report	Score by quarters: 3-1, 3-0, 1-2, 3-0			Ryde Aquatic Centre; Referees: Rolf Ludecke (GER), Vahid Moradi (IRI)
18 September 2000; 19:15	Report	four players 2	Goals	three players 1	Ryde Aquatic Centre; Referees: Rolf Ludecke (GER), Vahid Moradi (IRI)

19 September 2000; 19:15	Report	Netherlands	7–4	Canada	Ryde Aquatic Centre; Referees: Angel Moliner Molins (ESP), Renato Dani (ITA)
19 September 2000; 19:15	Report	Score by quarters: 3-0, 0-2, 2-2, 2-0			Ryde Aquatic Centre; Referees: Angel Moliner Molins (ESP), Renato Dani (ITA)
19 September 2000; 19:15	Report	two players 2	Goals	Begin 2	Ryde Aquatic Centre; Referees: Angel Moliner Molins (ESP), Renato Dani (ITA)

20 September 2000; 13:00	Report	Canada	4–9	Australia	Ryde Aquatic Centre; Referees: Rolf Ludecke (GER), Patrick Clemencon (FRA)
20 September 2000; 13:00	Report	Score by quarters: 0-1, 2-4, 1-2, 1-2			Ryde Aquatic Centre; Referees: Rolf Ludecke (GER), Patrick Clemencon (FRA)
20 September 2000; 13:00	Report	four players 1	Goals	Hankin 3	Ryde Aquatic Centre; Referees: Rolf Ludecke (GER), Patrick Clemencon (FRA)

- Classification match

22 September 2000; 18:00	Report	Canada	9–8 (OT)	Kazakhstan	Ryde Aquatic Centre; Referees: Andrew Jay Takata (USA), Phillip Bower (AUS)
22 September 2000; 18:00	Report	Score by quarters: 1-1, 3-3, 2-3, 2-1 OT: 1-0, 0–0			Ryde Aquatic Centre; Referees: Andrew Jay Takata (USA), Phillip Bower (AUS)
22 September 2000; 18:00	Report	four players 2	Goals	Pyryseva 3	Ryde Aquatic Centre; Referees: Andrew Jay Takata (USA), Phillip Bower (AUS)

- Team roster
  - Marie-Luc Arpin
  - Isabelle Auger
  - Johanne Bégin
  - Cora Campbell
  - Melissa Collins
  - Marie-Claude Deslières
  - Valérie Dionne
  - Ann Dow
  - Susan Gardiner
  - Waneek Horn-Miller
  - Sandra Lizé
  - Josée Marsolais
  - Jana Salat

== Weightlifting ==
Men

Athlete	Event	Snatch			Clean & Jerk			Total	Rank
Athlete	Event	1	2	3	1	2	3	Total	Rank
Sébastien Groulx	– 69 kg	125.0	130.0	~~132.5~~	160.0	167.5	~~172.5~~	297.5	15

== Wrestling ==
Freestyle

Athlete	Event	Elimination pool				Quarterfinals	Semifinals	Final / BM	
Athlete	Event	Opposition Result	Opposition Result	Opposition Result	Rank	Opposition Result	Opposition Result	Opposition Result	Rank
Guivi Sissaouri	58 kg	Dabir (IRI); L 0–3	Embalo (GBS); W	—N/a	2	did not advance			
Daniel Igali	69 kg	Bedineishvili (KOR); W 3–0	Tavakkolian (IRI); W 3–1	—N/a	1 Q	Sánchez (CUB); W 3–1	McIlravy (USA); W 6–3	Gitinov (RUS); W 7–4	1st place, gold medalist(s)
Justin Abdou	85 kg	Samušonok (LAT); L 2–3	Kurugliyev (KAZ); L 5–8	Romero (CUB); L 0–8	4	did not advance			
Dean Schmeichel	97 kg	Garmulewicz (POL); L 0–3	Shemarov (BLR); L 5–8	Szerda (AUS); L 2–4	4	did not advance			

== Death of Pierre Trudeau ==
Near the end of the Summer Olympics, on 28 September, Canadian athletes learned that former prime minister (from 1968 to 1984), Pierre Trudeau, had died. Owing to time difference, it was 29 September in Sydney.

Juan Antonio Samaranch, presiding over his last Olympics as IOC president, ordered the Canadian flag at athletes' village lowered to half-staff on orders from Canadian Foreign Affairs Minister Lloyd Axworthy. As the flag was lowered, Canadian athletes paid tribute to Trudeau. During medal ceremonies, whenever the Canadian flag flew, it was flown at half-mast, also on orders from Samaranch and Axworthy. They both ordered the Canadian flag flown at half-staff for the remainder of the Olympics, as the state funeral didn't take place until 3 October.

== Official outfitter ==
- Roots Canada was the official outfitter of clothing for members of the Canadian Olympic team. The same clothing was also sold at Roots stores in Canada.

== Notes ==
- Wallechinsky, David (2004). The Complete Book of the Summer Olympics (Athens 2004 Edition). Toronto, Canada. ISBN 1-894963-32-6.
- International Olympic Committee (2001). The Results. Retrieved 12 November 2005.
- Sydney Organising Committee for the Olympic Games (2001). Official Report of the XXVII Olympiad Volume 1: Preparing for the Games. Retrieved 20 November 2005.
- Sydney Organising Committee for the Olympic Games (2001). Official Report of the XXVII Olympiad Volume 2: Celebrating the Games. Retrieved 20 November 2005.
- Sydney Organising Committee for the Olympic Games (2001). The Results. Retrieved 20 November 2005.
- International Olympic Committee Web Site
