= 2001 World Wrestling Championships – Men's freestyle 69 kg =

Men's freestyle 69 kg at the 2001 World Championships
- Venue: Winter Sports Palace
- Dates: 23–25 November 2001
- Competitors: 32 from 32 nations

Medalists
gold medal	Nikolay Paslar	Bulgaria
silver medal	Amir Tavakkolian	Iran
bronze medal	Jang Jae-sung	South Korea

The men's freestyle 69 kilograms is a competition featured at the 2001 World Wrestling Championships, and was held at the Winter Sports Palace in Sofia, Bulgaria from 23 to 25 November 2001.

== Results ==
Legend

- F — Won by fall

=== Preliminary round ===
==== Pool 1 ====
Pos	Athlete	Pld	W	L	CP	TP	CUB	GER	POL
1	Yosvany Sánchez (CUB)	2	2	0	7	13	—	3–1	10–0
2	Sergej Kowalenko (GER)	2	1	1	4	4	1–3 PP	—	3–0
3	Mariusz Dąbrowski (POL)	2	0	2	0	0	0–4 ST	0–3 PO	—

Source: Official website

==== Pool 2 ====
Pos	Athlete	Pld	W	L	CP	TP	CAN	RUS	KGZ
1	Daniel Igali (CAN)	2	2	0	6	9	—	4–1	5–0
2	Irbek Farniev (RUS)	2	1	1	5	11	1–3 PP	—	10–0
3	Talant Jekshenov (KGZ)	2	0	2	0	0	0–3 PO	0–4 ST	—

Source: Official website

==== Pool 3 ====
Pos	Athlete	Pld	W	L	CP	TP	UKR	MKD	PER
1	Zaza Zazirov (UKR)	2	2	0	7	16	—	6–2	10–0
2	Lulzim Vrenezi (MKD)	2	1	1	5	17	1–3 PP	—	15–5
3	Enrique Cubas (PER)	2	0	2	1	5	0–4 ST	1–4 SP	—

Source: Official website

==== Pool 4 ====
Pos	Athlete	Pld	W	L	CP	TP	IRI	JPN	MGL
1	Amir Tavakkolian (IRI)	2	2	0	6	11	—	7–6	4–1
2	Kazuyuki Miyata (JPN)	2	1	1	4	13	1–3 PP	—	7–4
3	Adiyaakhüügiin Boldsükh (MGL)	2	0	2	2	5	1–3 PP	1–3 PP	—

Source: Official website

==== Pool 5 ====
Pos	Athlete	Pld	W	L	CP	TP	KOR	BLR	UZB
1	Jang Jae-sung (KOR)	2	2	0	6	10	—	6–1	4–0
2	Sergey Demchenko (BLR)	2	1	1	4	11	1–3 PP	—	10–3
3	Jakhongir Abdurakhmonov (UZB)	2	0	2	1	3	0–3 PO	1–3 PP	—

Source: Official website

==== Pool 6 ====
Pos	Athlete	Pld	W	L	CP	TP	TUR	USA	ESP
1	Ahmet Gülhan (TUR)	2	2	0	6	15	—	7–6	8–0
2	Chris Bono (USA)	2	1	1	5	17	1–3 PP	—	11–0
3	Carlos Domínguez (ESP)	2	0	2	0	0	0–3 PO	0–4 ST	—

Source: Official website

==== Pool 7 ====
Pos	Athlete	Pld	W	L	CP	TP	ROM	TKM	MDA
1	László Szabolcs (ROM)	2	2	0	7	18	—	11–1 Fall	7–1
2	Alai Niýazmengliýew (TKM)	2	1	1	4	1	0–4 TO	—	WO
3	Marian Luca (MDA)	2	0	2	1	1	1–3 PP	0–4 PA	—

Source: Official website

==== Pool 8 ====
Pos	Athlete	Pld	W	L	CP	TP	SVK	IND	GBR
1	Štefan Fernyák (SVK)	2	2	0	6	10	—	4–1	6–3
2	Jai Bhagwan (IND)	2	1	1	5	1	1–3 PP	—	WO
3	John Melling (GBR)	2	0	2	1	3	1–3 PP	0–4 PA	—

Source: Official website

==== Pool 9 ====
Pos	Athlete	Pld	W	L	CP	TP	BUL	GRE	KAZ	VEN
1	Nikolay Paslar (BUL)	3	3	0	11	26	—	4–1	10–0	12–0
2	Theodoros Kemeridis (GRE)	3	2	1	7	11	1–3 PP	—	4–0	6–0
3	Sabit Kendybayev (KAZ)	3	1	2	3	5	0–4 ST	0–3 PO	—	5–0
4	Jhonny Cedeño (VEN)	3	0	3	0	0	0–4 ST	0–3 PO	0–3 PO	—

Source: Official website

==== Pool 10 ====
Pos	Athlete	Pld	W	L	CP	TP	GEO	AZE	FRA	NED
1	Emzar Bedineishvili (GEO)	3	3	0	11	16	—	9–4	7–0 Ret	WO
2	Zahid Mirzayev (AZE)	3	2	1	9	15	1–3 PP	—	WO	11–4 Fall
3	Sébastien Bourdin (FRA)	3	1	2	3	5	0–4 PA	0–4 PA	—	5–1
4	Gocha Papashvili (NED)	3	0	3	1	5	0–4 PA	0–4 TO	1–3 PP	—

Source: Official website

=== Knockout round ===
Round of 16
Yosvany Sánchez (CUB)	5
Daniel Igali (CAN)	2
Zaza Zazirov (UKR)	0
Amir Tavakkolian (IRI)	3

Quarterfinals
Yosvany Sánchez (CUB)	2
Amir Tavakkolian (IRI)	3
Jang Jae-sung (KOR)	4
Ahmet Gülhan (TUR)	2
László Szabolcs (ROM)	3
Štefan Fernyák (SVK)	1
Nikolay Paslar (BUL)	3
Emzar Bedineishvili (GEO)	2

Semifinals
Amir Tavakkolian (IRI)	5^{F}
Jang Jae-sung (KOR)	2
László Szabolcs (ROM)	0
Nikolay Paslar (BUL)	12

Final
Amir Tavakkolian (IRI)	1
Nikolay Paslar (BUL)	6
Bronze medal match
Jang Jae-sung (KOR)	6
László Szabolcs (ROM)	2
