= Wrestling at the 2000 Summer Olympics – Men's freestyle 69 kg =

Men's freestyle 69 kg at the Games of the XXVII Olympiad
- Venue: Sydney Convention and Exhibition Centre
- Date: 29 September – 1 October 2000
- Competitors: 20 from 20 nations

Medalists
1st place, gold medalist(s)		Daniel Igali	Canada
2nd place, silver medalist(s)		Arsen Gitinov	Russia
3rd place, bronze medalist(s)		Lincoln McIlravy	United States

The men's freestyle 69 kilograms at the 2000 Summer Olympics as part of the wrestling program was held at the Sydney Convention and Exhibition Centre from September 29 to October 1. The competition held with an elimination system of three or four wrestlers in each pool, with the winners qualify for the quarterfinals, semifinals and final by way of direct elimination.

== Schedule ==
All times are Australian Eastern Daylight Time (UTC+11:00)

Date	Time	Event
29 September 2000	09:30	Round 1
29 September 2000	17:00	Round 2
30 September 2000	09:30	Round 3
1 October 2000	09:00	Quarterfinals
1 October 2000	09:00	Semifinals
1 October 2000	14:30	Finals

== Results ==
Legend

- WO — Won by walkover

=== Elimination pools ===
==== Pool 1 ====
Pos	Athlete	Pld	W	L	CP	TP	Qualification
1	Daniel Igali (CAN)	2	2	0	6	5	Knockout round
2	Amir Tavakkolian (IRI)	2	1	1	4	7	
3	Emzar Bedineishvili (GEO)	2	0	2	1	4	

Source: Official Report

	Score		CP
Emzar Bedineishvili (GEO)	4–5	Amir Tavakkolian (IRI)	1–3 PP
Daniel Igali (CAN)	3–0	Emzar Bedineishvili (GEO)	3–0 PO
Amir Tavakkolian (IRI)	2–2	Daniel Igali (CAN)	1–3 PP

==== Pool 2 ====
Pos	Athlete	Pld	W	L	CP	TP	Qualification
1	Yosvany Sánchez (CUB)	2	2	0	6	11	Knockout round
2	Petar Kasabov (BUL)	2	1	1	3	3	
3	Mariusz Dąbrowski (POL)	2	0	2	1	2	

Source: Official Report

	Score		CP
Yosvany Sánchez (CUB)	4–0	Petar Kasabov (BUL)	3–0 PO
Mariusz Dąbrowski (POL)	0–7	Yosvany Sánchez (CUB)	0–3 PO
Petar Kasabov (BUL)	3–2	Mariusz Dąbrowski (POL)	3–1 PP

==== Pool 3 ====
Pos	Athlete	Pld	W	L	CP	TP	Qualification
1	Ivan Diaconu (MDA)	2	1	1	4	7	Knockout round
2	Zaza Zazirov (UKR)	2	1	1	4 (Note: Head-to-head result: UKR 3–1 JPN.)	6	
3	Takahiro Wada (JPN)	2	1	1	4	6	

Source: Official Report
Notes:

	Score		CP
Zaza Zazirov (UKR)	3–2	Takahiro Wada (JPN)	3–1 PP
Ivan Diaconu (MDA)	5–3	Zaza Zazirov (UKR)	3–1 PP
Takahiro Wada (JPN)	4–2	Ivan Diaconu (MDA)	3–1 PP

==== Pool 4 ====
Pos	Athlete	Pld	W	L	CP	TP	Qualification
1	Lincoln McIlravy (USA)	2	2	0	7	8	Knockout round
2	Yüksel Şanlı (TUR)	2	1	1	4	9	
3	Ibo Oziti (NGR)	2	0	2	0	1	

Source: Official Report

	Score		CP
Ibo Oziti (NGR)	1–2 Ret	Lincoln McIlravy (USA)	0–4 PA
Yüksel Şanlı (TUR)	6–0	Ibo Oziti (NGR)	3–0 PO
Lincoln McIlravy (USA)	6–3	Yüksel Şanlı (TUR)	3–0 PP

==== Pool 5 ====
Pos	Athlete	Pld	W	L	CP	TP	Qualification
1	Arsen Gitinov (RUS)	3	3	0	10	19	Knockout round
2	Arayik Gevorgyan (ARM)	3	2	1	9	23	
3	Edison Hurtado (COL)	3	1	2	3	3	
4	Nikolaos Loizidis (GRE)	3	0	3	2	3	

Source: Official Report

	Score		CP
Arayik Gevorgyan (ARM)	1–3	Arsen Gitinov (RUS)	1–3 PP
Nikolaos Loizidis (GRE)	0–3	Edison Hurtado (COL)	0–3 PO
Arayik Gevorgyan (ARM)	12–2	Nikolaos Loizidis (GRE)	4–1 SP
Arsen Gitinov (RUS)	11–0	Edison Hurtado (COL)	4–0 ST
Arayik Gevorgyan (ARM)	10–0	Edison Hurtado (COL)	4–0 ST
Arsen Gitinov (RUS)	5–1	Nikolaos Loizidis (GRE)	3–1 PP

==== Pool 6 ====
Pos	Athlete	Pld	W	L	CP	TP	Qualification
1	Sergey Demchenko (BLR)	3	3	0	11	13	Knockout round
2	Almaz Askarov (KGZ)	3	2	1	7	13	
3	Cameron Johnston (AUS)	3	1	2	4	0	
4	Ruslan Veliyev (KAZ)	3	0	3	1	1	

Source: Official Report

	Score		CP
Almaz Askarov (KGZ)	3–1	Ruslan Veliyev (KAZ)	3–1 PP
Sergey Demchenko (BLR)	10–0	Cameron Johnston (AUS)	4–0 ST
Almaz Askarov (KGZ)	0–3	Sergey Demchenko (BLR)	0–3 PO
Ruslan Veliyev (KAZ)	WO	Cameron Johnston (AUS)	0–4 PA
Almaz Askarov (KGZ)	10–0	Cameron Johnston (AUS)	4–0 ST
Ruslan Veliyev (KAZ)	WO	Sergey Demchenko (BLR)	0–4 PA

=== Knockout round ===
Quarterfinals
Daniel Igali (CAN)	3
Yosvany Sánchez (CUB)	1
Ivan Diaconu (MDA)	1
Lincoln McIlravy (USA)	3

Semifinals
Daniel Igali (CAN)	6
Lincoln McIlravy (USA)	3
Arsen Gitinov (RUS)	3
Sergey Demchenko (BLR)	2

Gold medal match
Daniel Igali (CAN)	7
Arsen Gitinov (RUS)	4
Bronze medal match
Lincoln McIlravy (USA)	3
Sergey Demchenko (BLR)	1

Classification 5th–6th
Yosvany Sánchez (CUB)	6
Ivan Diaconu (MDA)	3

== Final standing ==
Rank	Athlete
1st place, gold medalist(s)	Daniel Igali (CAN)
2nd place, silver medalist(s)	Arsen Gitinov (RUS)
3rd place, bronze medalist(s)	Lincoln McIlravy (USA)
4	Sergey Demchenko (BLR)
5	Yosvany Sánchez (CUB)
6	Ivan Diaconu (MDA)
7	Arayik Gevorgyan (ARM)
8	Almaz Askarov (KGZ)
9	Yüksel Şanlı (TUR)
10	Amir Tavakkolian (IRI)
11	Zaza Zazirov (UKR)
12	Takahiro Wada (JPN)
13	Cameron Johnston (AUS)
14	Edison Hurtado (COL)
15	Petar Kasabov (BUL)
16	Nikolaos Loizidis (GRE)
17	Emzar Bedineishvili (GEO)
18	Mariusz Dąbrowski (POL)
19	Ruslan Veliyev (KAZ)
20	Ibo Oziti (NGR)
