= Wrestling at the 1996 Summer Olympics – Men's freestyle 68 kg =

Men's freestyle 68 kg at the Games of the XXVI Olympiad
- Venue: Georgia World Congress Center
- Dates: 29–30 July 1996
- Competitors: 19 from 19 nations

Medalists
1st place, gold medalist(s)		Vadim Bogiev	Russia
2nd place, silver medalist(s)		Townsend Saunders	United States
3rd place, bronze medalist(s)		Zaza Zazirov	Ukraine

The Men's Freestyle 68 kilograms at the 1996 Summer Olympics as part of the wrestling program were held at the Georgia World Congress Center from July 29 to July 30. The gold and silver medalists were determined by the final match of the main single-elimination bracket. The losers advanced to the repechage. These matches determined the bronze medalist for the event.

== Results ==
=== Round 1 ===
	Score		CP
1/16 finals
Arsen Fadzaev (UZB)	2–2	Akbar Fallah (IRI)	3–1 PP
Zaza Zazirov (UKR)	10–0	Ibo Oziti (NGR)	4–0 ST
Félix Diédhiou (SEN)	0–12 Fall	Küllo Kõiv (EST)	0–4 TO
János Fórizs (HUN)	0–3	Elshad Allahverdiyev (AZE)	0–3 PO
Hwang Sang-ho (KOR)	7–0	Paulo Ibire (ARG)	3–0 PO
Yosvany Sánchez (CUB)	1–3	Oleg Gogol (BLR)	1–3 PP
Arayik Gevorgyan (ARM)	9–1	Ahmad Al-Osta (SYR)	3–1 PP
Yüksel Şanlı (TUR)	1–3	Townsend Saunders (USA)	1–3 PP
Craig Roberts (CAN)	12–2	Richard Weiss (AUS)	4–1 SP
Vadim Bogiev (RUS)		Bye	

=== Round 2 ===
	Score		CP
1/8 finals
Vadim Bogiev (RUS)	3–1	Arsen Fadzaev (UZB)	3–1 PP
Zaza Zazirov (UKR)	5–0	Küllo Kõiv (EST)	3–0 PO
Elshad Allahverdiyev (AZE)	3–5	Hwang Sang-ho (KOR)	1–3 PP
Oleg Gogol (BLR)	2–3	Arayik Gevorgyan (ARM)	1–3 PP
Townsend Saunders (USA)	3–1	Craig Roberts (CAN)	3–1 PP
Repechage
Akbar Fallah (IRI)	1–0	Ibo Oziti (NGR)	3–0 PO
Félix Diédhiou (SEN)	1–13	János Fórizs (HUN)	1–4 SP
Paulo Ibire (ARG)	0–10	Yosvany Sánchez (CUB)	0–4 ST
Ahmad Al-Osta (SYR)	4–1	Yüksel Şanlı (TUR)	3–1 PP
Richard Weiss (AUS)		Bye	

=== Round 3 ===
	Score		CP
Quarterfinals
Vadim Bogiev (RUS)	6–4	Zaza Zazirov (UKR)	3–1 PP
Hwang Sang-ho (KOR)		Bye	
Arayik Gevorgyan (ARM)		Bye	
Townsend Saunders (USA)		Bye	
Repechage
Richard Weiss (AUS)	0–5	Akbar Fallah (IRI)	0–3 PO
János Fórizs (HUN)	2–6	Yosvany Sánchez (CUB)	1–3 PP
Ahmad Al-Osta (SYR)	11–9	Arsen Fadzaev (UZB)	3–1 PP
Küllo Kõiv (EST)	5–1	Elshad Allahverdiyev (AZE)	3–1 PP
Oleg Gogol (BLR)	4–0	Craig Roberts (CAN)	3–0 PO

=== Round 4 ===
	Score		CP
Semifinals
Vadim Bogiev (RUS)	3–2	Hwang Sang-ho (KOR)	3–1 PP
Arayik Gevorgyan (ARM)	0–4	Townsend Saunders (USA)	0–3 PO
Repechage
Akbar Fallah (IRI)	1–3	Yosvany Sánchez (CUB)	1–3 PP
Ahmad Al-Osta (SYR)	1–4	Küllo Kõiv (EST)	1–3 PP
Oleg Gogol (BLR)	1–6	Zaza Zazirov (UKR)	1–3 PP

=== Round 5 ===
	Score		CP
Repechage
Yosvany Sánchez (CUB)	6–0	Küllo Kõiv (EST)	3–0 PO
Zaza Zazirov (UKR)		Bye	

=== Round 6 ===
	Score		CP
Repechage
Hwang Sang-ho (KOR)	0–7 Fall	Zaza Zazirov (UKR)	0–4 TO
Yosvany Sánchez (CUB)	8–4	Arayik Gevorgyan (ARM)	3–1 PP

=== Finals ===
	Score		CP
Classification 7th–8th
Küllo Kõiv (EST)	7–2	Ahmad Al-Osta (SYR)	3–1 PP
Classification 5th–6th
Hwang Sang-ho (KOR)	0–0	Arayik Gevorgyan (ARM)	0–3 PO
Bronze medal match
Zaza Zazirov (UKR)	8–6	Yosvany Sánchez (CUB)	3–1 PP
Gold medal match
Vadim Bogiev (RUS)	1–1	Townsend Saunders (USA)	3–1 PP

== Final standing ==
Rank	Athlete
1st place, gold medalist(s)	Vadim Bogiev (RUS)
2nd place, silver medalist(s)	Townsend Saunders (USA)
3rd place, bronze medalist(s)	Zaza Zazirov (UKR)
4	Yosvany Sánchez (CUB)
5	Arayik Gevorgyan (ARM)
6	Hwang Sang-ho (KOR)
7	Küllo Kõiv (EST)
8	Ahmad Al-Osta (SYR)
9	Oleg Gogol (BLR)
10	Akbar Fallah (IRI)
11	János Fórizs (HUN)
12	Craig Roberts (CAN)
13	Arsen Fadzaev (UZB)
14	Elshad Allahverdiyev (AZE)
15	Yüksel Şanlı (TUR)
16	Richard Weiss (AUS)
17	Félix Diédhiou (SEN)
18	Paulo Ibire (ARG)
18	Ibo Oziti (NGR)
