= Armenia at the 2000 Summer Olympics =

- IOC code: ARM
- NOC: National Olympic Committee of Armenia
- Website: www.armnoc.am (in Armenian)

in Sydney
- Competitors: 25 (23 men and 2 women) in 10 sports
- Flag bearer: Vaghinak Galustyan
- Medals Ranked 71st: Gold 0 Silver 0 Bronze 1 Total 1

Summer Olympics appearances (overview)
- 1996; 2000; 2004; 2008; 2012; 2016; 2020; 2024

Other related appearances
- Russian Empire (1900–1912); Soviet Union (1952–1988); Unified Team (1992)

Armenia competed at the 2000 Summer Olympics in Sydney, Australia.

== Medalists ==
Medal	Name	Sport	Event	Date
Bronze	Arsen Melikyan	Weightlifting	Men's −77 kg	22 September

== Athletics ==
Men
Field events

Athlete	Event	Qualification		Final	
Athlete	Event	Distance	Position	Distance	Position
Shirak Poghosyan	Long jump	7.24	44	Did not advance	
Armen Martirosyan	Triple jump	14.95	35	Did not advance	

Women
Track

Athlete	Event	Heat		Semifinal		Final	
Athlete	Event	Result	Rank	Result	Rank	Result	Rank
Anna Nasilyan	800 m	2:14.86	7	Did not advance			

== Boxing ==
Athlete	Event	Round of 32	Round of 16	Quarterfinals	Semifinals	Final	
Athlete	Event	Opposition Result	Opposition Result	Opposition Result	Opposition Result	Opposition Result	Rank
Vic Darchinyan	Men's flyweight	Bye	Raziapov (RUS); W 20–11	Zhumadilov (KAZ); L 8–15	Did not advance		
Aram Ramazyan	Men's bantamweight	Khurtsilava (GEO); L 9–12	Did not advance				
Artur Gevorgyan	Men's lightweight	Karimzhanov (KAZ); L 6–16	Did not advance				

== Canoeing ==
=== Flatwater ===
Athlete	Event	First round		Semifinals		Final	
Athlete	Event	Time	Rank	Time	Rank	Time	Rank
Vladimir Grushikhin	Men's K–1 500 m	1:42.430	4 Q	Disq		Did not advance	
Vladimir Grushikhin	Men's K–1 1000 m	3:40.623	5 Q	3:41.143	4	Did not advance	

== Diving ==
Men

Athlete	Event	Preliminaries		Semifinals		Final	
Athlete	Event	Points	Rank	Points	Rank	Points	Rank
Hovhannes Avtandilyan	10 m platform	284.91	38	Did not advance			

== Judo ==
Athlete	Event	Round of 32	Round of 16	Quarterfinals	Semifinals	Final / BM	
Athlete	Event	Opposition Result	Opposition Result	Opposition Result	Opposition Result	Opposition Result	Rank
Vardan Voskanyan	Men's −60 kg	Matuszek (SVK); L	Did not advance				

== Shooting ==
Athlete	Event	Qualification		Final	
Athlete	Event	Score	Position	Score	Position
Hrachya Petikyan	Men's 50 m rifle three positions	1156	29	Did not advance	

== Swimming ==
Men

Athlete	Event	Preliminaries		Semifinals		Final	
Athlete	Event	Time	Rank	Time	Rank	Time	Rank
Dmitri Margaryan	50 m freestyle	25.29	58	Did not advance			

Women

Athlete	Event	Preliminaries		Semifinals		Final	
Athlete	Event	Time	Rank	Time	Rank	Time	Rank
Yuliana Mikheeva	50 m freestyle	29.79	63	Did not advance			

== Tennis ==
Athlete	Event	Round of 64	Round of 32	Round of 16	Quarterfinals	Semifinals	Final / BM	
Athlete	Event	Opposition Score	Opposition Score	Opposition Score	Opposition Score	Opposition Score	Opposition Score	Rank
Sargis Sargsian	Men's singles	Pless (DEN); L 3–6, 4–6	Did not advance					

== Weightlifting ==
Men

Athlete	Event	Snatch			Clean & Jerk			Total	Rank
Athlete	Event	1	2	3	1	2	3	Total	Rank
Rudik Petrosyan	– 69 kg	142.5	147.5	~~150.0~~	182.5	187.5	~~192.5~~	335.0	5
Arsen Melikyan	– 77 kg	162.5	~~167.5~~	167.5	197.5	~~202.5~~	~~202.5~~	365.0	3rd place, bronze medalist(s)
Gagik Khachatryan	– 85 kg	170.0	175.0	~~180.0~~	200.0	205.0	~~210.0~~	380.0	5
Ashot Danielyan	+ 105 kg	200.0	~~205.0~~	207.5	250.0	257.5	~~262.5~~	~~465.0~~	DSQ

== Wrestling ==
Greco–Roman

Athlete	Event	Pool Matches			Quarterfinals	Semifinals	Final / BM	
Athlete	Event	Opposition Result	Opposition Result	Opposition Result	Opposition Result	Opposition Result	Opposition Result	Rank
Karen Mnatsakanyan	−58 kg	Petrenko (BLR); L 2–4	Gruenwald (USA); L 3–4	n/a	Did not advance			15
Vaghinak Galstyan	−63 kg	Chachua (GEO); L 5–6	Shanjun (CHN); W 2–2	n/a	Did not advance			12
Levon Geghamyan	−76 kg	Avramis (GRE); L 1–3	Abrahamian (SWE); L 0–3	n/a	Did not advance			18
Rafael Samurgashev	−97 kg	Peña (CUB); W 1–0	Matviyenko (KAZ); L 0–6	n/a	Did not advance			14
Haykaz Galstyan	−130 kg	Giunta (ITA); L 0–1	Gardner (USA); L 0–6	Ayari (TUN); W 3–2	Did not advance			13

Freestyle

Athlete	Event	Pool Matches			Quarterfinals	Semifinals	Final / BM	
Athlete	Event	Opposition Result	Opposition Result	Opposition Result	Opposition Result	Opposition Result	Opposition Result	Rank
Martin Berberyan	−58 kg	Buslovych (UKR); L 1–5	Kuhner (GER); W 14–2	Abdullayev (AZE); W 11–1	Did not advance			6
Arshak Hayrapetyan	−63 kg	Boburbekov (KGZ); W 6–2	Savin (BLR); W 7–4	n/a	Talaei (IRI); L 2–3	Did not advance		5
Arayik Gevorgyan	−69 kg	Gitinov (RUS); L 1–3	Loizidis (GRE); W 12–2	Hurtado (COL); W 10–0	Did not advance			7
