= Kullo =

Kullo may be a reference to:

- The Dawro people of southern Ethiopia
- The island of Kullö, in the Stockholm archipelago, Sweden
- Küllo, Estonian male given name
  - Küllo Arjakas (born 1959), Estonian historian and politician
  - Küllo Kõiv (1972–1998), Estonian wrestler
