= Diaconu =

Diaconu is a Romanian surname. It may refer to:

- Adrian Diaconu (born 1978), Romanian professional boxer
- Andreea Diaconu (born 1991), Romanian model
- Eusebiu Diaconu (born 1981), Romanian Greco-Roman wrestler
- Ivan Diaconu (fl. 2000), Moldovan wrestler
- Mircea Diaconu (1949–2024), Romanian actor, writer, and politician
- Nicolae Diaconu (born 1980), Romanian water polo player
- Raul Diaconu (born 1989), Romanian footballer
