= Wrestling at the 1998 Asian Games – Men's freestyle 69 kg =

Men's freestyle 69 kg at the 1998 Asian Games
- Venue: Thammasat Gymnasium 1
- Dates: 17–18 December 1998
- Competitors: 13 from 13 nations

Medalists
gold medal	Amir Tavakkolian	Iran
silver medal	Ahmad Al-Osta	Syria
bronze medal	Ryusaburo Katsu	Japan

The men's freestyle 69 kilograms wrestling competition at the 1998 Asian Games in Bangkok was held on 17 and 18 December 1998 at the Thammasat Gymnasium 1.

The gold and silver medalists were determined by the final match of the main single-elimination bracket. The losers advanced to the repechage. These matches determined the bronze medalist for the event.

== Schedule ==
All times are Indochina Time (UTC+07:00)

Date	Time	Event
Thursday, 17 December 1998	09:00	Round 1
Thursday, 17 December 1998	16:00	Round 2
Friday, 18 December 1998	09:00	Round 3
Friday, 18 December 1998	09:00	Round 4
Friday, 18 December 1998	16:00	Round 5
Friday, 18 December 1998	16:00	Finals

== Results ==
=== Round 1 ===
	Score		CP
1/8 finals
Almaz Askarov (KGZ)	10–0	Mohammed Al-Shabi (YEM)	4–0 ST
Ryusaburo Katsu (JPN)	11–0	Muhammad Ali (PAK)	4–0 ST
Ochir Damdinov (KAZ)	3–4	Sujeet Maan (IND)	1–3 PP
Jo Hyon-chol (PRK)	1–3	Amir Tavakkolian (IRI)	1–3 PP
Igor Kupeev (UZB)	6–0	Buyandelgeriin Batbayar (MGL)	3–0 PO
Nattawut Supsintum (THA)	0–10	Ahmad Al-Osta (SYR)	0–4 ST
Kim Eun-yoo (KOR)		Bye	

=== Round 2 ===
	Score		CP
Quarterfinals
Kim Eun-yoo (KOR)	1–0	Almaz Askarov (KGZ)	3–0 PO
Ryusaburo Katsu (JPN)	7–2	Sujeet Maan (IND)	3–1 PP
Amir Tavakkolian (IRI)	4–2	Igor Kupeev (UZB)	3–1 PP
Ahmad Al-Osta (SYR)		Bye	
Repechage
Mohammed Al-Shabi (YEM)	0–7	Muhammad Ali (PAK)	0–3 PO
Ochir Damdinov (KAZ)	0–11	Jo Hyon-chol (PRK)	0–4 ST
Buyandelgeriin Batbayar (MGL)	4–0 Fall	Nattawut Supsintum (THA)	4–0 TO

=== Round 3 ===
	Score		CP
Semifinals
Ahmad Al-Osta (SYR)	0–0	Kim Eun-yoo (KOR)	3–0 PO
Ryusaburo Katsu (JPN)	0–9	Amir Tavakkolian (IRI)	0–3 PO
Repechage
Muhammad Ali (PAK)	2–14	Jo Hyon-chol (PRK)	1–4 SP
Buyandelgeriin Batbayar (MGL)	3–4	Almaz Askarov (KGZ)	1–3 PP
Sujeet Maan (IND)	3–0	Igor Kupeev (UZB)	3–0 PO

=== Round 4 ===
	Score		CP
Repechage
Jo Hyon-chol (PRK)	0–3	Almaz Askarov (KGZ)	0–3 PO
Sujeet Maan (IND)		Bye	

=== Round 5 ===
	Score		CP
Repechage
Kim Eun-yoo (KOR)	0–6	Sujeet Maan (IND)	0–3 PO
Almaz Askarov (KGZ)	6–7	Ryusaburo Katsu (JPN)	1–3 PP

=== Finals ===
	Score		CP
Bronze medal match
Sujeet Maan (IND)	2–3	Ryusaburo Katsu (JPN)	1–3 PP
Gold medal match
Ahmad Al-Osta (SYR)	1–2	Amir Tavakkolian (IRI)	1–3 PP

== Final standing ==
Rank	Athlete
1st place, gold medalist(s)	Amir Tavakkolian (IRI)
2nd place, silver medalist(s)	Ahmad Al-Osta (SYR)
3rd place, bronze medalist(s)	Ryusaburo Katsu (JPN)
4	Sujeet Maan (IND)
5	Almaz Askarov (KGZ)
6	Kim Eun-yoo (KOR)
7	Jo Hyon-chol (PRK)
8	Buyandelgeriin Batbayar (MGL)
9	Muhammad Ali (PAK)
10	Igor Kupeev (UZB)
11	Ochir Damdinov (KAZ)
12	Nattawut Supsintum (THA)
12	Mohammed Al-Shabi (YEM)
