= 1992 European Espoirs Wrestling Championships =

- Host city: Hungary, Szekesfehervar
- Dates: 22 - 29 August 1992

The 1992 European Espoirs Wrestling Championships was the 11th edition of European Espoirs Wrestling Championships was held from 22 April to 29 August 1992 in Szekesfehervar, Hungary.

== Medal table ==
Rank	Nation	Gold	Silver	Bronze	Total
1	Russia	6	2	1	9
2	Ukraine	5	2	2	9
3	Georgia	2	2	4	8
4	Armenia	2	1	1	4
5	Bulgaria	1	2	3	6
6	Hungary	1	1	2	4
6	Turkey	1	1	2	4
8	Sweden	1	1	0	2
9	Latvia	1	0	1	2
10	Romania	0	2	1	3
11	Belarus	0	1	0	1
11	Czech Republic	0	1	0	1
11	Estonia	0	1	0	1
11	Germany	0	1	0	1
11	Greece	0	1	0	1
11	Israel	0	1	0	1
17	Moldova	0	0	1	1
17	Norway	0	0	1	1
17	Poland	0	0	1	1
Totals (19 entries)		20	20	20	60

== Medal summary ==
=== Men's freestyle ===
Event	Gold	Silver	Bronze
48 kg	Armen Mkrtchyan; Armenia	Yuri Senek; Russia	Viktor Efteni; Ukraine
52 kg	Vyacheslav Senek; Russia	Tanyo Tenev; Bulgaria	Mevlana Kulaç; Turkey
57 kg	David Pogosyan; Georgia	Štefan Fernyák; Czech Republic	Ilgar Abdullaev; Russia
62 kg	Yordan Denev; Bulgaria	Aslan Akhmetchanov; Russia	István Demeter; Hungary
68 kg	Arayik Gevorgyan; Armenia	Küllo Kõiv; Estonia	Zaza Zazirov; Georgia
74 kg	Alan Msokov; Russia	Laurentiu Ciuca; Romania	Miroslav Gochev; Bulgaria
82 kg	Eldar Kurtanidze; Georgia	Eldar Assanov; Ukraine	Attila Nagy; Hungary
90 kg	Igors Samušonoks; Latvia	Gari Modosyan; Georgia	Igor Panow; Ukraine
100 kg	Aleksey Nitchepurenko; Ukraine	Zurabi Lolashvili; Georgia	Jurijs Janovic; Latvia
130 kg	Zekeriya Güçlü; Turkey	Tibor Balogh; Hungary	Miroslav Botev; Bulgaria

=== Men's Greco-Roman ===
Event	Gold	Silver	Bronze
48 kg	Zafar Guliev; Russia	Vardan Paloyan; Armenia	Vitali Cheban; Moldova
52 kg	Magomed Magomedov; Russia	Alexander Pavlov; Belarus	Armen Nazaryan; Armenia
57 kg	Assaf Gadshiev; Russia	Marian Sandu; Romania	Mose Shaknelidze; Georgia
62 kg	Hrihoriy Kamyshenko; Ukraine	Usama Aziz; Sweden	Jerzy Szeibinger; Poland
68 kg	Alexander Tretyakov; Russia	Rustam Adzhi; Ukraine	Biser Georgiev; Bulgaria
74 kg	Martin Lidberg; Sweden	Boris Vinakurov; Israel	Muttalip Yerlikaya; Turkey
82 kg	Igor Bugaj; Ukraine	Olrik Meißner; Germany	Knut Isaksen; Norway
90 kg	Nándor Gelénesi; Hungary	Iordanis Konstantinidis; Greece	Koba Chichveishvili; Georgia
100 kg	Georgiy Saldadze; Ukraine	Gökmen İnan; Turkey	Chwisya Megarishvili; Georgia
130 kg	Sergey Elagin; Ukraine	Emil Mashev; Bulgaria	Laurenţiu Amariei; Romania
