= Wrestling at the 1998 Asian Games – Men's freestyle 76 kg =

Men's freestyle 76 kg at the 1998 Asian Games
- Venue: Thammasat Gymnasium 1
- Dates: 16–17 December 1998
- Competitors: 11 from 11 nations

Medalists
| gold medal | Moon Eui-jae | South Korea |
| silver medal | Kenji Koshiba | Japan |
| bronze medal | Ruslan Veliyev | Kazakhstan |

The men's freestyle 76 kilograms wrestling competition at the 1998 Asian Games in Bangkok was held on 16 December and 17 December at the Thammasat Gymnasium 1.

The gold and silver medalists were determined by the final match of the main single-elimination bracket. The losers advanced to the repechage. These matches determined the bronze medalist for the event.

== Schedule ==
All times are Indochina Time (UTC+07:00)

| Date | Time | Event |
|---|---|---|
| Wednesday, 16 December 1998 | 09:00 | Round 1 |
| Wednesday, 16 December 1998 | 16:00 | Round 2 |
| Wednesday, 16 December 1998 | 16:00 | Round 3 |
| Thursday, 17 December 1998 | 09:00 | Round 4 |
| Thursday, 17 December 1998 | 09:00 | Round 5 |
| Thursday, 17 December 1998 | 16:00 | Finals |

== Results ==
=== Round 1 ===
| | Score | | CP |
1/8 finals
| Pejman Dorostkar (IRI) | 3–2 | Ruslan Veliyev (KAZ) | 3–1 PP |
| Nurbek Izabekov (KGZ) | 4–2 | Sagid Katinovasov (UZB) | 3–1 PP |
| Lê Đức Tùng (VIE) | 1–13 | Moon Eui-jae (KOR) | 1–4 SP |
| Basangluobu (CHN) | 12–0 | Phanupan Supsintum (THA) | 4–0 ST |
| Kenji Koshiba (JPN) | 9–7 | Tümen-Ölziin Mönkhbayar (MGL) | 3–1 PP |
| Han Tae-hyon (PRK) | | Bye | |

=== Round 2 ===
| | Score | | CP |
Quarterfinals
| Han Tae-hyon (PRK) | 0–0 | Pejman Dorostkar (IRI) | 0–3 PO |
| Nurbek Izabekov (KGZ) | 0–6 | Moon Eui-jae (KOR) | 0–3 PO |
| Basangluobu (CHN) | | Bye | |
| Kenji Koshiba (JPN) | | Bye | |
Repechage
| Ruslan Veliyev (KAZ) | 5–3 | Sagid Katinovasov (UZB) | 3–1 PP |
| Lê Đức Tùng (VIE) | 6–1 Fall | Phanupan Supsintum (THA) | 4–0 TO |
| Tümen-Ölziin Mönkhbayar (MGL) | | Bye | |

=== Round 3 ===
| | Score | | CP |
Semifinals
| Pejman Dorostkar (IRI) | 0–2 | Moon Eui-jae (KOR) | 0–3 PO |
| Basangluobu (CHN) | 0–4 Fall | Kenji Koshiba (JPN) | 0–4 TO |
Repechage
| Tümen-Ölziin Mönkhbayar (MGL) | 0–10 | Ruslan Veliyev (KAZ) | 0–4 ST |
| Lê Đức Tùng (VIE) | 3–7 Fall | Han Tae-hyon (PRK) | 0–4 TO |
| Nurbek Izabekov (KGZ) | | Bye | |

=== Round 4 ===
| | Score | | CP |
Repechage
| Nurbek Izabekov (KGZ) | 7–4 | Han Tae-hyon (PRK) | 3–1 PP |
| Ruslan Veliyev (KAZ) | | Bye | |

=== Round 5 ===
| | Score | | CP |
Repechage
| Pejman Dorostkar (IRI) | 0–3 | Nurbek Izabekov (KGZ) | 0–3 PO |
| Ruslan Veliyev (KAZ) | 10–0 | Basangluobu (CHN) | 4–0 ST |

=== Finals ===
| | Score | | CP |
Bronze medal match
| Nurbek Izabekov (KGZ) | 2–3 | Ruslan Veliyev (KAZ) | 1–3 PP |
Gold medal match
| Moon Eui-jae (KOR) | 12–0 | Kenji Koshiba (JPN) | 4–0 ST |

== Final standing ==
| Rank | Athlete |
|---|---|
| 1st place, gold medalist(s) | Moon Eui-jae (KOR) |
| 2nd place, silver medalist(s) | Kenji Koshiba (JPN) |
| 3rd place, bronze medalist(s) | Ruslan Veliyev (KAZ) |
| 4 | Nurbek Izabekov (KGZ) |
| 5 | Pejman Dorostkar (IRI) |
| 6 | Basangluobu (CHN) |
| 7 | Han Tae-hyon (PRK) |
| 8 | Lê Đức Tùng (VIE) |
| 9 | Tümen-Ölziin Mönkhbayar (MGL) |
| 10 | Sagid Katinovasov (UZB) |
| 11 | Phanupan Supsintum (THA) |
