= Küllo =

Estonian male given name

- Gender: Male
- Language: Estonian

Origin
- Region of origin: Estonia

Küllo is an Estonian-language male given name.

People named Küllo include:

- Küllo Arjakas (born 1959), Estonian historian and politician
- Küllo Kõiv (1972–1998), Estonian wrestler
