= 1997 Asian Wrestling Championships =

Men
- Host city: Tehran, Iran
- Dates: 12–18 April 1997
- Stadium: Azadi Indoor Stadium

Women
- Host city: Taipei, Taiwan
- Dates: 20–21 June 1997

Champions
- Freestyle: Iran
- Greco-Roman: South Korea
- Women: Japan

The following is the final results of the 1997 Asian Wrestling Championships being held in Iran and Taiwan.

== Medal table ==
Rank	Nation	Gold	Silver	Bronze	Total
1	Japan	6	4	3	13
2	Iran	5	0	6	11
3	South Korea	4	5	2	11
4	Kazakhstan	2	2	2	6
5	Uzbekistan	1	2	2	5
6	Mongolia	1	2	0	3
7	China	1	1	0	2
8	North Korea	1	0	2	3
9	Turkmenistan	1	0	0	1
10	Chinese Taipei	0	3	3	6
11	Kyrgyzstan	0	2	1	3
12	Syria	0	1	0	1
13	India	0	0	1	1
Totals (13 entries)		22	22	22	66

== Team ranking ==
Rank	Men's freestyle		Men's Greco-Roman		Women's freestyle	
Rank	Team	Points	Team	Points	Team	Points
1	Iran	70	South Korea	65	Japan	55
2	South Korea	65	Kazakhstan	56	Chinese Taipei	51
3	Japan	40	Iran	54	Turkmenistan	29
4	Kazakhstan	37	Uzbekistan	51	South Korea	21
5	China	33	Japan	47	Philippines	18

== Medal summary ==
=== Men's freestyle ===
Event	Gold	Silver	Bronze
54 kg	Jin Ju-dong; North Korea	Niu Pinghui; China	Gholamreza Mohammadi; Iran
58 kg	Oyuunbilegiin Pürevbaatar; Mongolia	Seo Min-kyu; South Korea	Mohammad Talaei; Iran
63 kg	Abbas Hajkenari; Iran	Baek Jin-kuk; South Korea	Kim Kwang-il; North Korea
69 kg	Davoud Ghanbari; Iran	Ahmad Al-Osta; Syria	Almaz Askarov; Kyrgyzstan
76 kg	Moon Eui-jae; South Korea	Tümen-Ölziin Mönkhbayar; Mongolia	Sagid Katinovasov; Uzbekistan
85 kg	Alireza Heidari; Iran	Yang Hyung-mo; South Korea	Soslan Fraev; Uzbekistan
97 kg	Abdolreza Kargar; Iran	Bayanmönkhiin Gantogtokh; Mongolia	Islam Bayramukov; Kazakhstan
125 kg	Ebrahim Mehraban; Iran	Hiroyuki Obata; Japan	Jagdish Singh; India

=== Men's Greco-Roman ===
Event	Gold	Silver	Bronze
54 kg	Dilshod Aripov; Uzbekistan	Nurym Dyusenov; Kazakhstan	Kang Yong-gyun; North Korea
58 kg	Yuriy Melnichenko; Kazakhstan	Kim In-sub; South Korea	Mehdi Nassiri; Iran
63 kg	Mkhitar Manukyan; Kazakhstan	Yasutoshi Motoki; Japan	Park Young-shin; South Korea
69 kg	Choi Sang-sun; South Korea	Grigori Pulyaev; Uzbekistan	Andrey Nikiforov; Kazakhstan
76 kg	Takamitsu Katayama; Japan	Bisolt Dezeev; Kyrgyzstan	Han Chee-ho; South Korea
85 kg	Park Myung-suk; South Korea	Raatbek Sanatbayev; Kyrgyzstan	Behrouz Jamshidi; Iran
97 kg	Ba Yanchuan; China	Roman Vegl; Kazakhstan	Dariush Ghalavand; Iran
125 kg	Yang Young-jin; South Korea	Shuhrat Sadiev; Uzbekistan	Mehdi Sabzali; Iran

=== Women's freestyle ===
Event	Gold	Silver	Bronze
46 kg	Shoko Yoshimura; Japan	Yukie Umeda; Japan	Wu Li-chuan; Chinese Taipei
51 kg	Seiko Yamamoto; Japan	Huang Chiu-yueh; Chinese Taipei	Yuka Tsuji; Japan
56 kg	Yuka Mitadera; Japan	Chie Sawada; Japan	Lin Chin-miao; Chinese Taipei
62 kg	Ari Suzuki; Japan	Huang Wan-ling; Chinese Taipei	Tomoe Miyamoto; Japan
68 kg	Nadežda Želtakowa; Turkmenistan	Wu Huei-li; Chinese Taipei	Chieko Miyamoto; Japan
75 kg	Reiko Sumiya; Japan	Chae Soo-jung; South Korea	Sha Ling-li; Chinese Taipei

== See also ==
- List of sporting events in Taiwan
