= Richard Weiss (disambiguation) =

Richard Weiss (1963–1997) was a German-American kayaker.

Richard Weiss or Weiß may also refer to:

- Richard Weiss (wrestler) (born 1973), Australian Olympic wrestler
- Richard Weiss (musician) on I Can't Help It
- Dick Weiss (born 1946), American glass artist
- Rick Weiss, voice artist of videogame Shadow of Rome
- Richard Weiß, former Rollei engineer and chief of development
