= Paulo Ibire =

Argentine wrestler

Personal information
- Nationality: Argentine
- Born: 1 May 1967 (age 59)

Sport
- Sport: Wrestling

Paulo Alejandro Ibire (born 1 May 1967) is an Argentine former wrestler. He competed in the men's freestyle 68 kg at the 1996 Summer Olympics.
