= Oleg Gogol =

Belarusian wrestler

Personal information
- Nationality: Belarusian
- Born: 4 December 1968 (age 57)

Sport
- Sport: Wrestling

Oleg Gogol (born 4 December 1968) is a Belarusian wrestler. He competed in the men's freestyle 68 kg at the 1996 Summer Olympics.
