= Petar Kasabov =

Bulgarian wrestler

Personal information
- Nationality: Bulgarian
- Born: 22 January 1979 (age 47) Petrich, Bulgaria

Sport
- Sport: Wrestling

Petar Kasabov (born 22 January 1979) is a Bulgarian wrestler. He competed in the men's freestyle 69 kg at the 2000 Summer Olympics.
