= Félix Diédhiou =

Senegalese wrestler

Personal information
- Nationality: Senegalese
- Born: 8 October 1969 (age 56)

Sport
- Sport: Wrestling

Félix Malal Diédhiou (born 8 October 1969) is a Senegalese wrestler. He competed in the men's freestyle 68 kg at the 1996 Summer Olympics.
