= Vadim Bogiev =

Russian wrestler of Ossetian heritage

Medal record

Men's freestyle wrestling

Representing Russia

Olympic Games
Gold medal – first place	1996 Atlanta	68 kg

World Championships
Silver medal – second place	1993 Toronto	68 kg

Vadim Iosifovich Bogiyev (Russian: Вадим Иосифович Богиев; born 27 December 1970) is a Russian wrestler, who earned the gold medal at the Summer Olympic Games 1996 in men's Freestyle wrestling. He was also he 1993 worlds runner-up and three-time European champion.

== Olympics ==
Bogiyev competed at the 1996 Summer Olympics in Atlanta where he received a gold medal in Freestyle wrestling, the lightweight class.
