= Davoud Ghanbari =

Iranian wrestler

Medal record

Men's freestyle wrestling

Representing Iran

Asian Championships
Gold medal – first place	1997 Tehran	69 kg

Davoud Ghanbari (Persian: داوود قنبری) is an Iranian former wrestler who competed in the 1997 World Wrestling Championships, 1997 Asian Wrestling Championships and 1994 Wrestling World Cup. He won gold in 1997 Asian Wrestling Championships, and ranked 5th in 1997 World Wrestling Championships. He is one of the few wrestlers ever who could defeat Russian champion wrestler Buvaisar Saitiev in international competition, doing so in the 1994 Wrestling World Cup in Edmonton, Canada.
