= Denise Carriere =

Canadian softball player

Personal information
- Born: 21 January 1970 (age 56) Brampton, Ontario, Canada

Sport
- Sport: Softball

Denise Carriere (born 21 January 1970) is a Canadian softball player. She competed in the women's tournament at the 2000 Summer Olympics.
