= Raul Diaconu =

Romanian footballer

Personal information
- Full name: Raul Liviu Diaconu
- Date of birth: 11 August 1989 (age 37)
- Place of birth: Bucharest, Romania
- Position: Left back

Team information
- Current team: CSM Alexandria
- Number: 2

Youth career
- 2001–2006: AS Romprim București

Senior career*
Years	Team	Apps	(Gls)
2006–2009	AS Romprim București	25	(6)
2008–	Steaua II București	2	(0^{1})
- * Club domestic league appearances and goals as of 3 September 2009

Raul Liviu Diaconu (born 11 August 1989 in Bucharest, Romania) is a Romanian football player under contract with CSM Alexandria.
