= Ivan Diaconu =

Moldovan freestyle wrestler (born 1976)

Personal information
- Born: 21 September 1976 (age 49) Ungheni, Moldova
- Height: 170 cm (5 ft 7 in)

Sport
- Country: Moldova
- Sport: Freestyle wrestling
- Weight class: 69–76 kg (152–168 lb)

Ivan Diaconu (born 21 September 1976) is a ten-time national champion from Moldova. He competed at the 2000 Summer Olympics in the men's freestyle 69 kg event.

Diaconu also competed at the World Wrestling Championships in 1998 (freestyle 69 kg), 1999 (freestyle 69 kg), 2002 (freestyle 74 kg), and 2003 (freestyle 74 kg).
