= Cameron Johnston (wrestler) =

Australian wrestler (born 1970)

Personal information
- Nationality: Australian
- Born: 6 December 1970 (age 55) Smithers, British Columbia, Canada

Cameron Johnston (born 6 December 1970 in Smithers, British Columbia) is an Australian freestyle wrestler. He competed for Australia at the 2000 Summer Olympics.
