= Jacki Nichol =

Canadian softball player

Personal information
- Born: 10 April 1972 (age 52); Swift Current, Saskatchewan, Canada

Sport
- Sport: Softball

Jacki Nichol (born 10 April 1972) is a Canadian softball player. She competed in the women's tournament at the 2000 Summer Olympics.
