= Sandy Newsham =

Canadian softball player

Personal information
- Born: 7 September 1973 (age 52) Winnipeg, Manitoba, Canada

Sport
- Sport: Softball

Sandy Newsham (born 7 September 1973) is a Canadian softball player. She competed in the women's tournament at the 2000 Summer Olympics.
