= Edison Hurtado =

Colombian wrestler (born 1972)

Personal information
- Nationality: Colombian
- Born: 25 July 1972 (age 53) Tumaco, Colombia

Sport
- Sport: Wrestling
Medal record
Representing Colombia
Pan American Games
Silver medal – second place	2003 Santo Domingo	66 kg
Silver medal – second place	2007 Rio de Janeiro	66 kg

Edison Hurtado Lerma (born 25 July 1972) is a Colombian wrestler. He competed in the men's freestyle 69 kg at the 2000 Summer Olympics.
