= Meaggan Wilton =

Canadian softball player

Personal information
- Born: 29 February 1976 (age 49); Penetanguishene, Ontario, Canada

Sport
- Sport: Softball

Meaggan Wilton (born 29 February 1976) is a Canadian softball player. She competed in the women's tournament at the 2000 Summer Olympics.

Wilton married Brady Pettipiece in October 2004. The couple have three sons.
