= Cherene Hiesl-Boyer =

Canadian softball player

Personal information
- Born: 11 June 1973 (age 52) Scarborough, Ontario, Canada

Sport
- Sport: Softball

Cherene Hiesl-Boyer (born June 11, 1973) is a Canadian softball player. She competed in the women's tournament at the 2000 Summer Olympics.
