= János Fórizs =

Hungarian wrestler

Personal information
- Nationality: Hungarian
- Born: 17 March 1969 (age 57) Mezőtúr, Hungary

Sport
- Sport: Wrestling

János Fórizs (born 17 March 1969) is a Hungarian wrestler. He competed in the men's freestyle 68 kg at the 1996 Summer Olympics.
