= Küllo Arjakas =

Estonian historian and politician

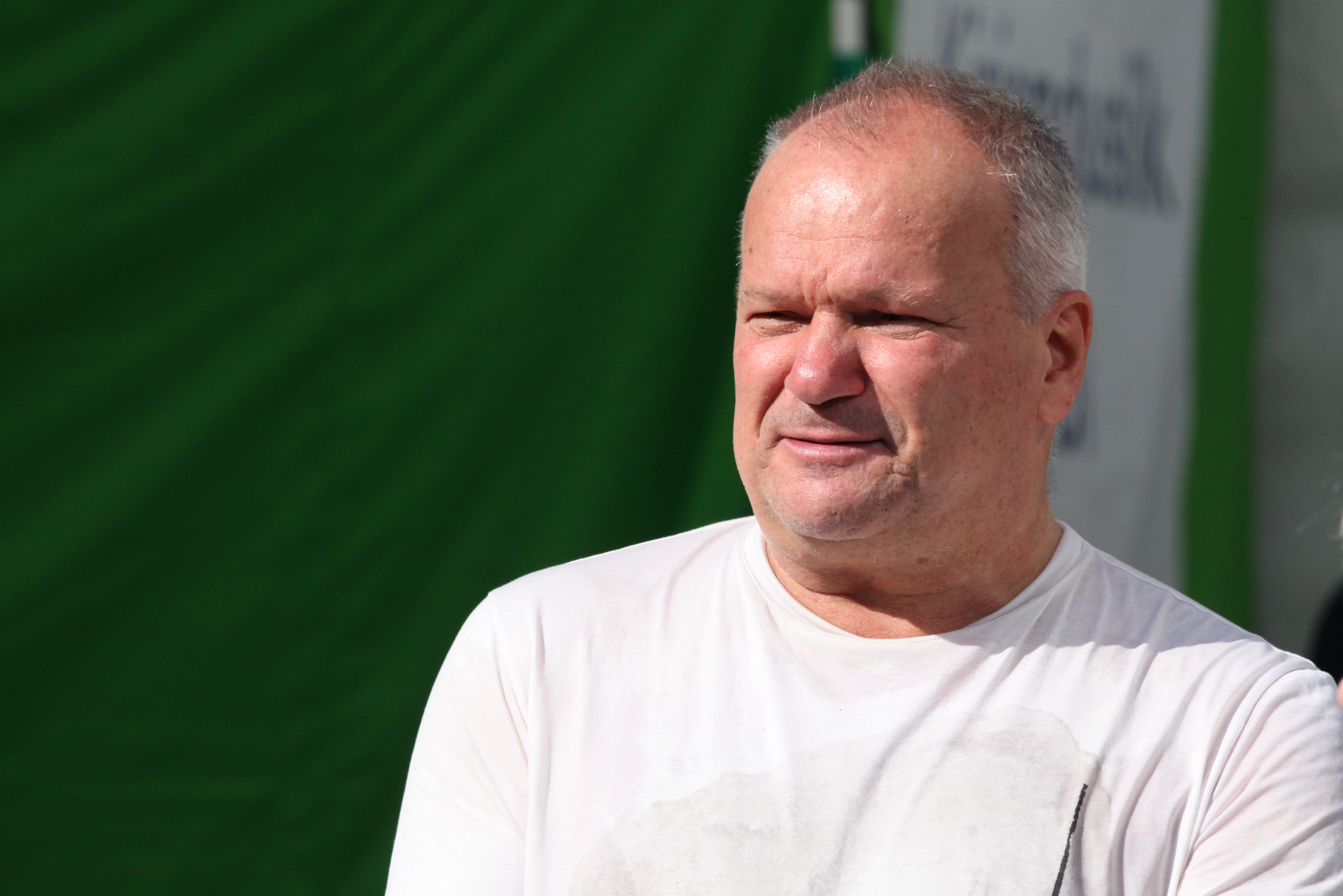
Küllo Arjakas at the annual Literary Street festival 2021 in Tallinn, Estonia

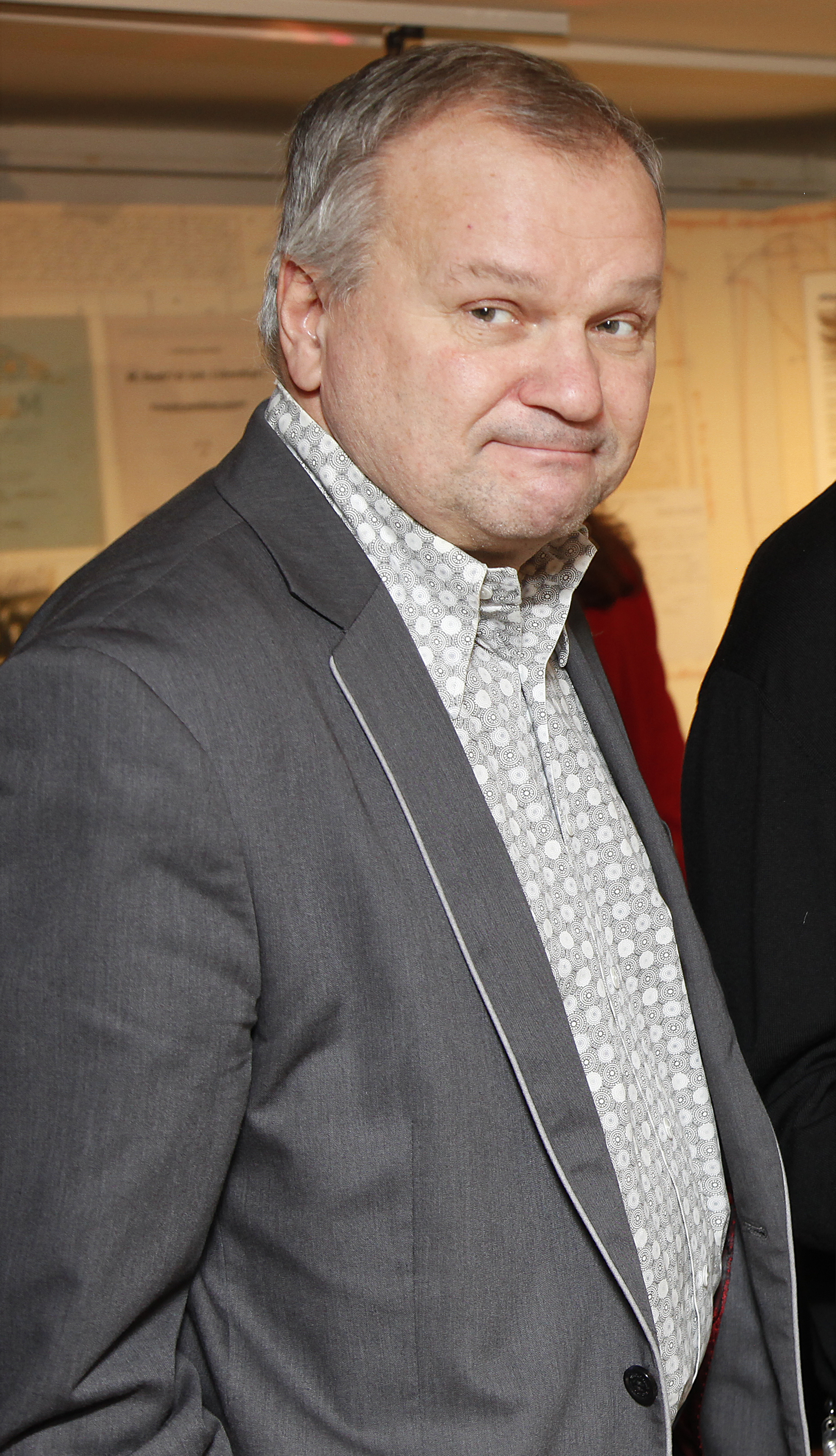
Küllo Arjakas in 2014.

Küllo Arjakas (born 10 October 1959) is an Estonian historian and politician. He has been a member of the IX and X Riigikogu.

Arjakas was born in Pärnu. He is a member of the Estonian Centre Party.

== Publications ==
- "Eesti ajalugu ärkamisajast kuni tänapäevani". Koolibri 1992
- "Rahvarinne". Koos Vilja Laanaruga. Tallinn: Eesti Keskerakond, 1998.
- "Eesti Vabariik 90: sündmused ja arengud". Eesti Entsüklopeediakirjastus 2008
- "Faatum: Eesti tee hävingule 1939-1940: riigikontrolör Karl Soonpää päevik Eesti Vabariigi saatuseaastatest 1939-1940: Molotovi–Ribbentropi pakti tagamaad: dokumente ja materjale", 2009, ISBN 9789985854907
- "Eesti raudtee 140. Sissevaated ajalukku". Tallinn: Eesti Raudtee, 2010
- "Loto, loto: Eesti Loto 40". Tallinn 2011
- "Eesti hümn". Tallinn: Menu kirjastus, 2012
- "Eesti lipp". Tallinn: Menu kirjastus, 2013
- "Kui väikesed olid suured: Balti kett 25 ". Tallinn: Rahvarinde Muuseum, 2014
- "Saku Õlletehas 195: Eesti õllekultuuri edendamine 1820-2015". Tallinn: Menu kirjastus: Saku Õlletehas, 2015
