= Arsen Gitinov =

Russian-Kyrgyz wrestler (born 1977)

Medal record

Men's freestyle wrestling

Representing Russia

Olympic Games
Silver medal – second place	2000 Sydney	69 kg

Arsen Gitinov (born 1 June 1977 in Tlondoda, Dagestan ASSR) is a Russian and Kyrgyzstani male freestyle wrestler from Dagestan. He participated in Men's freestyle 74 kg at 2008 Summer Olympics. After defeating Krystian Brzozowski and Ibrahim Aldatov in the preliminary rounds, he was eliminated in the quarterfinals by Kiril Terziev.

Representing Russia, he was a silver medalist of Men's freestyle 69kg at the 2000 Summer Olympics.
