= Hwang Sang-ho =

South Korean wrestler (born 1971)

Personal information
- Born: May 28, 1971 (age 55)
- Height: 175 cm (5 ft 9 in)

Korean name
- Hangul: 황상호
- RR: Hwang Sangho
- MR: Hwang Sangho

Sport
- Country: South Korea
- Sport: Freestyle Wrestling
- Weight class: 69-68 kg
Medal record
Men's freestyle wrestling
Representing South Korea
World Championships
Silver medal – second place	1997 Krasnoyarsk	69 kg
Asian Games
Bronze medal – third place	1994 Hiroshima	68 kg
Asian Wrestling Championships
Gold medal – first place	1992 Tehran	68 kg
Silver medal – second place	1996 Xiaoshan	68 kg
East Asian Games
Gold medal – first place	1997 Pusan	69 kg

Hwang Sang-ho (born 28 May 1971) is a South Korean former wrestler who competed in the 1996 Summer Olympics.
