= Nikolaos Loizidis =

Greek wrestler

Personal information
- Nationality: Greek
- Born: 13 October 1979 (age 46) Athens, Greece

Sport
- Sport: Wrestling

Nikolaos Loizidis (born 13 October 1979) is a Greek wrestler. He competed in the men's freestyle 69 kg at the 2000 Summer Olympics.
