= Daniel Igali =

Nigerian-Canadian wrestler (born 1974)

Personal information
- Full name: Baraladei Daniel Igali
- Nationality: Nigeria; Canada
- Born: February 3, 1974 (age 52) Eniwari, Bayelsa State, Nigeria
Medal record
Men's freestyle wrestling
Representing Canada
Olympic Games
Gold medal – first place	2000 Sydney	69 kg
World Championships
Gold medal – first place	Ankara 1999	69 kg
World Cup
Silver medal – second place	1999 Spokane	69 kg
Pan American Games
Bronze medal – third place	1999 Winnipeg	69 kg
Men's collegiate wrestling
Representing Simon Fraser
NAIA Championships
Gold medal – first place	1997 Jamestown	158 lb
Gold medal – first place	1998 Primm	158 lb
Gold medal – first place	1999 St. Charles	165 lb

Baraladei Daniel Igali (born February 3, 1974) is a Nigerian-Canadian wrestler. He won Canada's first ever Olympic gold medal in wrestling at the 2000 Summer Olympics and remains Canada's only male Olympic gold medalist in wrestling.

== Wrestling career ==
As captain of the Nigerian wrestling team, Igali came to Canada to compete in the 1994 Commonwealth Games. He remained in the country while seeking refugee status due to political unrest in Nigeria. He acquired citizenship in 1998.

Igali enrolled at Douglas College before transferring to Simon Fraser University to study criminology. He represented SFU from 1997 to 1999, winning three straight NAIA Championships and finishing with a 116-0 record in collegiate wrestling. Additionally, Igali earned All-American honours three times and the two Gorriaran Awards (1997, 1999) for most pins in the least total time.

At the 2000 Summer Olympics in Sydney, Australia, Igali won a gold medal for men's 69 kg freestyle wrestling. At the 2002 Commonwealth Games in Manchester, Igali won a gold medal in the Men's 74 kg freestyle wrestling. In 2007, Igali was inducted into the Canada's Sports Hall of Fame. He was later inducted into the Canadian Olympic Hall of Fame in 2012.

His wrestling career is highlighted in a television documentary directed by Joel Gordon called, "Wrestling with Destiny: The Life and Times of Daniel Igali". The biographical documentary film was broadcast by CBC Television in 2004 as an episode of the Life and Times TV series.

Igali became the first elected president of the Nigeria Wrestling Federation in 2013, creating the highest morale athletes for the 2018 Commonwealth Games, and highest medal hopefuls for Nigeria at the Games. The Nigerian team has otherwise lacklustre morale outside of wrestling. In September 2022, Igali was elected as a board member of UWW (United World Wrestling) for a five year term.

== Politics ==
On February 10, 2005, Igali announced that he would seek nomination as a candidate in Surrey-Newton for the British Columbia Liberal Party in the 2005 provincial election in British Columbia. He won the nomination, but was defeated by New Democrat opponent Harry Bains in the election.

== Personal ==
He completed a Master of Arts degree in criminology at Simon Fraser University, having previously attended Douglas College. While working on his master's degree, he trained at SFU and liked to help coach. Igali is currently the coach of the Nigerian National Wrestling Team.

In November 2006 Igali was injured during a violent robbery while in Nigeria. In 2020, he was the president of the Nigeria Wrestling Federation. He is a two-term member of the Bayelsa State assembly and also its sports commissioner.

In 2012, Igali was one of the recipients of the Top 25 Canadian Immigrant Awards presented by Canadian Immigrant Magazine.
