= Richard Weiss (wrestler) =

Australian wrestler

Personal information
- Nationality: Australian
- Born: 1 July 1973 (age 53) Košice, Czechoslovakia

Sport
- Sport: Freestyle wrestling

Richard Weiss (born 1 July 1973) is an Australian wrestler. He competed in the men's freestyle 68 kg at the 1996 Summer Olympics.

In the 2020s, Weiss operated a business in Frankston, Victoria that offered wrestling training.
