= Sergey Demchenko =

Belarusian wrestler

Personal information
- Nationality: Belarusian
- Born: 2 May 1974 (age 52) Gomel, Belarus

Sport
- Sport: Wrestling

Sergey Demchenko (born 2 May 1974) is a Belarusian wrestler. He competed in the men's freestyle 69 kg at the 2000 Summer Olympics.
