= Yüksel Şanlı =

Yüksel Şanlı (born November 14, 1973) is a former competitor in Freestyle Wrestling from Turkey. Şanlı was in the 1996 Olympic Games and the 2000 Olympic Games. He finished 15th in 1996 and 9th in 2000.

He also represented Turkey at the World Wrestling Championships in 1994, 1995, 1997 and 1999. He won a bronze medal in 1999.
