= Amir Tavakkolian =

Iranian wrestler (born 1971)

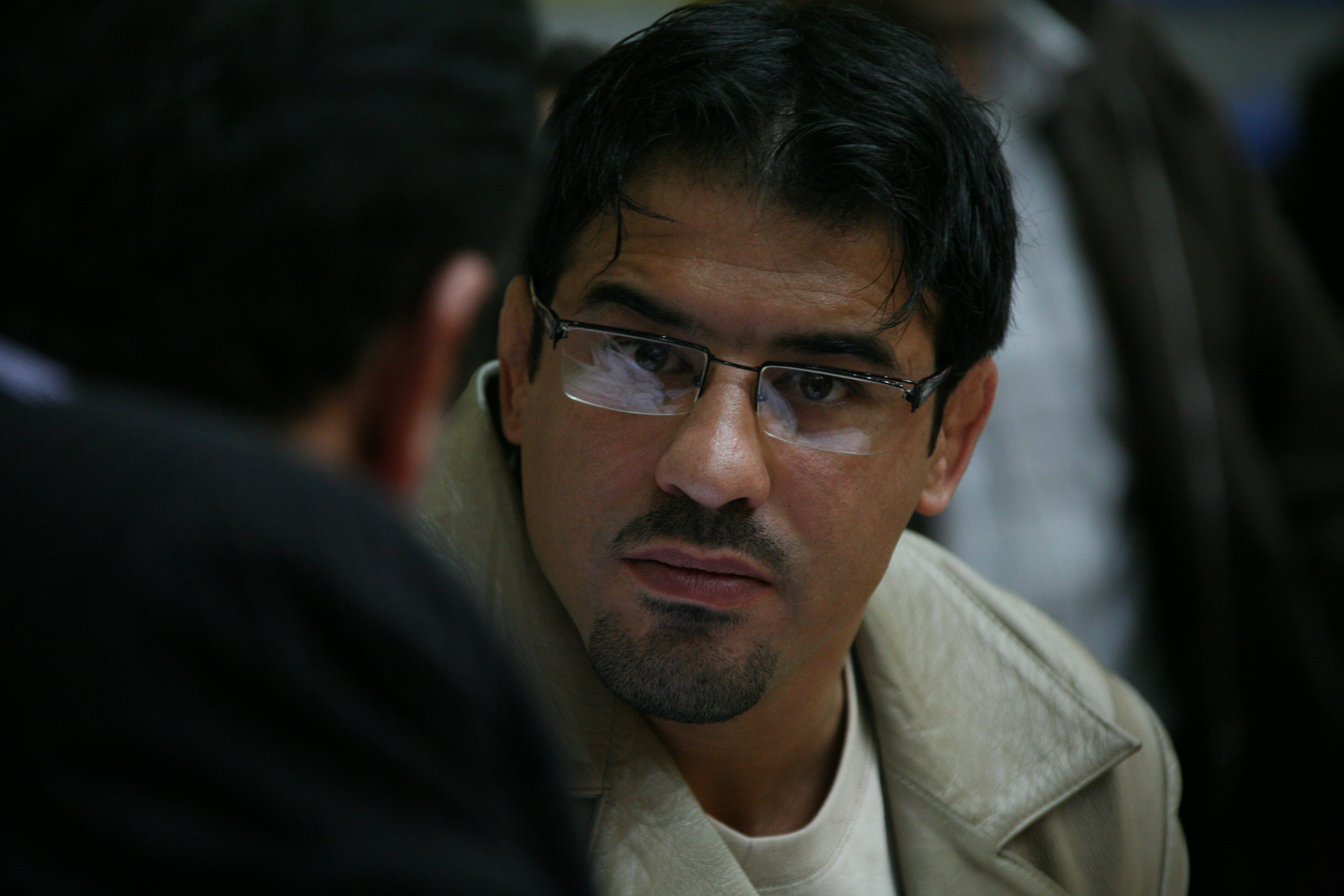

Medal record

Representing Iran

Men's freestyle wrestling

World Championships
Silver medal – second place	2001 Sofia	69 kg

Asian Games
Gold medal – first place	1998 Bangkok	69 kg

Asian Championships
Gold medal – first place	1995 Manila	68 kg
Gold medal – first place	2001 Ulan Bator	69 kg
Bronze medal – third place	1996 Xiaoshan	68 kg

Amir Tavakkolian (Persian: امیر توکلیان, born 7 September 1971 in Mashhad) is an Iranian wrestler.
