= Mariusz Dąbrowski =

Polish wrestler

Personal information
- Nationality: Polish
- Born: 18 November 1976 (age 49) Koszalin, Poland

Sport
- Sport: Wrestling

Mariusz Dąbrowski (born 18 November 1976) is a Polish wrestler. He competed in the men's freestyle 69 kg at the 2000 Summer Olympics.
