= Lincoln McIlravy =

American wrestler (born 1974)

Personal information
- Full name: Lincoln Paul McIlravy
- Born: July 17, 1974 (age 51) Rapid City, South Dakota, U.S.
- Home town: Philip, South Dakota, U.S.

Sport
- Country: United States
- Events: Freestyle and Folkstyle
- Team: USA
- Club: Hawkeye Wrestling Club
- College team: Iowa
- Coach: Dan Gable
Medal record
Men's freestyle wrestling
Representing the United States
Olympic Games
Bronze medal – third place	2000 Sydney	69 kg
World Championships
Silver medal – second place	1999 Ankara	69 kg
Bronze medal – third place	1998 Tehran	69 kg
World Cup
Gold medal – first place	1998 Stillwater	69 kg
Gold medal – first place	1999 Spokane	69 kg
Gold medal – first place	2000 Fairfax	69 kg
Goodwill Games
Gold medal – first place	1998 New York	69 kg
Pan American Games
Gold medal – first place	1999 Winnipeg	69 kg
Collegiate Wrestling
Representing the Iowa Hawkeyes
NCAA Division I Championships
Gold medal – first place	1993 Ames	142 lb
Gold medal – first place	1994 Chapel Hill	150 lb
Gold medal – first place	1997 Cedar Falls	150 lb
Silver medal – second place	1995 Iowa City	150 lb
Big Ten Championships
Gold medal – first place	1994 Iowa City	150 lb
Gold medal – first place	1995 Bloomington	150 lb
Gold medal – first place	1997 Minneapolis	150 lb
Silver medal – second place	1993 Columbus	142 lb

Lincoln Paul McIlravy (born July 17, 1974) is an American former freestyle and folkstyle wrestler.

== High School and College Career ==
McIlravy wrestled for Philip High School in Philip, South Dakota where he won five state titles, going on to wrestle in college for the University of Iowa under celebrated coach Dan Gable. He was a four-time finalist and three-time NCAA Wrestling Division I champion, winning in 1993, 1994 and 1997.

== International career ==
McIlravy later competed for the United States in the 1998 and 1999 World Championships, 1999 Pan Am Games, and the 2000 Summer Olympics in Sydney, Australia, where he won the bronze medal in the Freestyle 69 kg competition.

As a competitor, McIlravy was known for his aggressive and innovative attacks, including the so-called "boot scoot" technique. For his numerous accolades and example of a student-athlete, McIlravy was inducted into the National High School Hall of Fame. In 2009, McIlravy was inducted into the National Wrestling Hall of Fame as a Distinguished Member.

Since retirement from competition, McIlravy became a businessman, owning different hotels in Iowa and Nebraska.

== Bibliography ==
- Zavoral, Nolan. 1997. A Season on the Mat. Simon & Schuster. ISBN 978-0-684-84787-0
- Hammond, Jairus K. 2005. The History of Collegiate Wrestling. National Wrestling Hall of Fame and Museum. ISBN 978-0-9765064-0-9
