= Ruslan Veliyev =

Kazakhstani wrestler (born 1975)

Personal information
- Nationality: Kazakhstani
- Born: 30 June 1975 (age 51) Aktau, Kazakhstan

Sport
- Sport: Wrestling

Ruslan Aleksandrovich Veliyev (Russian: Руслан Александрович Велиев; born 30 June 1975) is a Kazakhstani wrestler. He competed in the men's freestyle 69 kg at the 2000 Summer Olympics.
