= Ahmad Al-Osta =

Syrian wrestler (born 1968)

Personal information
- Born: 7 October 1968 (age 57) Syria

Sport
- Sport: Freestyle wrestling
Medal record
Men's freestyle wrestling
Representing Syria
Asian Games
Silver medal – second place	1998 Bangkok	69 kg
Asian Championships
Silver medal – second place	1997 Tehran	69 kg
Bronze medal – third place	1992 Tehran	68 kg
West Asian Games
Gold medal – first place	1997 Tehran	69 kg

Ahmad Al-Osta (Arabic: أحمد الأسطة; born 7 October 1968) is a retired freestyle wrestler from Syria. He represented his country at the 1992 Summer Olympics and the 1996 Summer Olympics.
