= Küllo Kõiv =

Estonian wrestler (1972–1998)

Personal information
- Nationality: Estonian
- Born: 14 July 1972 Vana-Võidu, then part of Estonian SSR, Soviet Union
- Died: 29 June 1998 (aged 25) Viljandi, Estonia

Sport
- Sport: Wrestling

Küllo Kõiv (14 July 1972 – 29 June 1998) was an Estonian wrestler. He competed at the 1992 Summer Olympics and the 1996 Summer Olympics.

Kõiv died in an automobile accident in Viljandi in 1998, aged 25.
