= Emzarios Bentinidis =

Georgian wrestler (born 1975)

Medal record

Representing Georgia

Men's wrestling

European Championships
Bronze medal – third place	1999 Tampere	69 kg
Gold medal – first place	2000 Tampere	69 kg

Emzarios Bentinidis (born Emzar Bedineishvili on August 16, 1975 in Tbilisi) is a male freestyle wrestler from Georgia.

== Career ==
He represented Georgia at the 2000 Summer Olympics and Greece in the 2004 Summer Olympics. Representing Greece, he also participated in Men's Freestyle 74 kg at 2008 Summer Olympics. He lost in the quarterfinal to Soslan Tigiev from Uzbekistan.

He won a bronze medal at 2008 European Wrestling Championships. He is currently the coach of India wrestler Bajrang Punia who won a bronze medal at Tokyo 2020.
