= Almaz Askarov (wrestler) =

Kyrgyzstani wrestler (born 1973)

Personal information
- Nationality: Kyrgyzstani
- Born: 16 March 1973 (age 53)

Sport
- Sport: Wrestling

Almaz Askarov (born 16 March 1973) is a Kyrgyzstani wrestler. He competed in the men's freestyle 69 kg at the 2000 Summer Olympics.
