= Zaza Zazirov =

Ukrainian wrestler (born 1972)

Medal record

Men's freestyle wrestling

Representing Ukraine

Olympic Games
Bronze medal – third place	1996 Atlanta	68 kg

World Championships
Silver medal – second place	1998 Tehran	69 kg
Bronze medal – third place	1997 Krasnoyarsk	69 kg

European Championships
Gold medal – first place	1993 Istanbul	68 kg
Gold medal – first place	1999 Minsk	69 kg
Silver medal – second place	1998 Bratislava	69 kg
Bronze medal – third place	1996 Budapest	68 kg
Bronze medal – third place	1997 Warsaw	69 kg

Representing Georgia

European U20 Championships
Bronze medal – third place	1992 Szekesfehervar	68 kg

Zaza Dianozovych Zazirov (born 25 April 1972 in Gori, Georgian SSR) is a former Ukrainian wrestler and Olympic medalist. He received a bronze medal at the 1996 Summer Olympics in Atlanta. He obtained one silver medal and one bronze medal at the FILA Wrestling World Championships.
