= Yosvany Sánchez =

Cuban wrestler (born 1975)

Personal information
- Born: 17 September 1975 (age 50) Matanzas, Cuba

Sport
- Sport: Wrestling
Medal record
Representing Cuba
Pan American Games
Silver medal – second place	1999 Winnipeg	-69kg freestyle
Central American and Caribbean Games
Gold medal – first place	1998 Maracaibo	-69kg freestyle

Yosvany Sánchez Larrudet (born 17 September 1975) is a Cuban wrestler. He competed at the 1996 Summer Olympics and the 2000 Summer Olympics.
