= Arayik Gevorgyan =

Armenian freestyle wrestler

Personal information
- Born: 22 January 1973 (age 53) Artashat, Armenian SSR, Soviet Union
- Height: 1.65 m (5 ft 5 in)
- Weight: 74 kg (163 lb)

Sport
- Sport: Wrestling
- Event: Freestyle
- Club: Ararat Artashat
- Coached by: Razmik Goletsyan; Stepan Sargsyan
Medal record
Men's freestyle wrestling
Representing Armenia
World Championships
Gold medal – first place	1995 Atlanta	68 kg
Gold medal – first place	1997 Krasnoyarsk	69 kg
Gold medal – first place	1998 Tehran	69 kg
European Championships
Gold medal – first place	1997 Warsaw	69 kg
Silver medal – second place	1993 Istanbul	68 kg
Silver medal – second place	1994 Rome	68 kg
Silver medal – second place	1996 Budapest	68 kg
Silver medal – second place	1998 Bratislava	76 kg
Bronze medal – third place	1995 Fribourg	68 kg

Arayik Gevorgyan (Armenian: Արայիկ Գեւորգյան, born 22 January 1973) is a retired Armenian Freestyle wrestler. He is an Armenian Champion, European Champion, and three-time World Champion. Gevorgyan was awarded the Master of Sports of the USSR, International Class title in 1991 and the Honored Master of Sports of Armenia title in 1995.

== Biography ==
Gevorgyan was born on 22 January 1973 in a village of the Artashat region of Soviet Armenia. He started wrestling in 1984 under the guidance of Razmik Goletsyan. From 1989 to 1991, he was a member of the USSR junior freestyle wrestling team. Gevorgyan became a Junior European Champion in 1991. In 1992, Gevorgyan joined the Armenia espoir freestyle wrestling team. Gevorgyan became an Espoir European Champion in 1992 and an Espoir World Champion in 1993. After that year, Gevorgyan joined the Armenian national freestyle wrestling team. He became a three-time consecutive World Wrestling Champion, having won a gold medal at the 1995 World Wrestling Championships, 1997 World Wrestling Championships and 1998 World Wrestling Championships. Gevorgyan is the first ever wrestler from the independent Armenia to become a World Wrestling Champion in freestyle wrestling. He is also the first European Championship medalist in either Greco-Roman or freestyle wrestling and only the third European Championship gold medalist in freestyle wrestling from the independent Armenia. Gevorgyan is a three-time Olympian, competing at the 1996 Summer Olympics, 2000 Summer Olympics, and 2004 Summer Olympics. He was one of the favorites in 1996 and 2000 but wasn't able to win an Olympic medal. Gevorgyan was voted the Armenian Athlete of the Year for 1997 and 1998. He completed his international wrestling career after the 2004 Olympics in Athens.
