= 1999 World Wrestling Championships – Men's Greco-Roman 85 kg =

Specific wrestling event

Men's Greco-Roman 85 kg at the 1999 World Championships
- Venue: Peace and Friendship Stadium
- Dates: 24–26 September 1999
- Competitors: 33 from 33 nations

Medalists
gold medal	Luis Enrique Méndez	Cuba
silver medal	Thomas Zander	Germany
bronze medal	Raatbek Sanatbayev	Kyrgyzstan

The men's Greco-Roman 85 kilograms is a competition featured at the 1999 World Wrestling Championships, and was held at the Peace and Friendship Stadium in Piraeus, Athens, Greece from 24 to 26 September 1999.

== Results ==
Legend

- F — Won by fall
- R — Retired

=== Preliminary round ===
==== Pool 1 ====
Pos	Athlete	Pld	W	L	CP	TP	USA	TUR	GEO
1	Quincey Clark (USA)	2	2	0	6	4	—	3–0	1–1
2	Hamza Yerlikaya (TUR)	2	1	1	3	3	0–3 PO	—	3–0
3	Mukhran Vakhtangadze (GEO)	2	0	2	1	1	1–3 PP	0–3 PO	—

Source: Official website

==== Pool 2 ====
Pos	Athlete	Pld	W	L	CP	TP	IRI	EST	NED
1	Behrouz Jamshidi (IRI)	2	2	0	7	15	—	4–1	11–0
2	Toomas Proovel (EST)	2	1	1	5	23	1–3 PP	—	22–0 Ret
3	Jerry van de Pol (NED)	2	0	2	0	0	0–4 ST	0–4 PA	—

Source: Official website

==== Pool 3 ====
Pos	Athlete	Pld	W	L	CP	TP	BLR	YUG	ARM
1	Valery Tsilent (BLR)	2	2	0	6	9	—	3–1	6–0
2	Aleksandar Jovančević (YUG)	2	1	1	4	5	1–3 PP	—	4–0
3	Tsolak Yeghishyan (ARM)	2	0	2	0	0	0–3 PO	0–3 PO	—

Source: Official website

==== Pool 4 ====
Pos	Athlete	Pld	W	L	CP	TP	BUL	AZE	CZE
1	Dimitar Stoyanov (BUL)	2	2	0	6	9	—	4–1	5–0
2	Bahadur Gaziyev (AZE)	2	1	1	5	5	1–3 PP	—	4–0 Fall
3	Jiří Matýsek (CZE)	2	0	2	0	0	0–3 PO	0–4 TO	—

Source: Official website

==== Pool 5 ====
Pos	Athlete	Pld	W	L	CP	TP	GRE	FIN	JPN
1	Theofanis Anagnostou (GRE)	2	2	0	6	9	—	3–1	6–1
2	Marko Asell (FIN)	2	1	1	5	11	1–3 PP	—	10–0
3	Hidekazu Yokoyama (JPN)	2	0	2	1	1	1–3 PP	0–4 ST	—

Source: Official website

==== Pool 6 ====
Pos	Athlete	Pld	W	L	CP	TP	SWE	FRA	ISR
1	Martin Lidberg (SWE)	2	2	0	7	9	—	7–3	2–1 Ret
2	David Millien (FRA)	2	1	1	5	3	1–3 PP	—	WO
3	Gocha Tsitsiashvili (ISR)	2	0	2	0	1	0–4 PA	0–4 PA	—

Source: Official website

==== Pool 7 ====
Pos	Athlete	Pld	W	L	CP	TP	CUB	CHN	TKM
1	Luis Enrique Méndez (CUB)	2	2	0	8	17	—	13–0	4–0 Fall
2	Li Daxin (CHN)	2	1	1	4	12	0–4 ST	—	12–0
3	Haýder Çaryýew (TKM)	2	0	2	0	0	0–4 TO	0–4 ST	—

Source: Official website

==== Pool 8 ====
Pos	Athlete	Pld	W	L	CP	TP	RUS	VEN	ESP
1	Aleksandr Menshchikov (RUS)	2	2	0	7	4	—	4–1	WO
2	Eddy Bartolozzi (VEN)	2	1	1	4	9	1–3 PP	—	8–0
3	Juan Carlos Ramos (ESP)	2	0	2	0	0	0–4 PA	0–3 PO	—

Source: Official website

==== Pool 9 ====
Pos	Athlete	Pld	W	L	CP	TP	GER	NOR	KOR
1	Thomas Zander (GER)	2	2	0	6	6	—	3–2	3–0
2	Fritz Aanes (NOR)	2	1	1	4	5	1–3 PP	—	3–2
3	In Tae-jung (KOR)	2	0	2	1	2	0–3 PO	1–3 PP	—

Source: Official website

==== Pool 10 ====
Pos	Athlete	Pld	W	L	CP	TP	POL	HUN	UZB
1	Marcin Letki (POL)	2	2	0	7	4	—	3–2	1–2 Ret
2	János Kismóni (HUN)	2	1	1	5	2	1–3 PP	—	WO
3	Zafarkhon Achilov (UZB)	2	0	2	0	2	0–4 PA	0–4 PA	—

Source: Official website

==== Pool 11 ====
Pos	Athlete	Pld	W	L	CP	TP	UKR	KGZ	SUI
1	Oleksandr Sardaryan (UKR)	2	2	0	7	15	—	4–2	11–0
2	Raatbek Sanatbayev (KGZ)	2	1	1	5	2	1–3 PP	—	WO
3	David Martinetti (SUI)	2	0	2	0	0	0–4 ST	0–4 PA	—

Source: Official website

=== Knockout round ===
Round of 16
Quincey Clark (USA)	2
Behrouz Jamshidi (IRI)	2
Valery Tsilent (BLR)	13^{F}
Dimitar Stoyanov (BUL)	0
Theofanis Anagnostou (GRE)	0^{R}
Martin Lidberg (SWE)	7
Luis Enrique Méndez (CUB)	4
Aleksandr Menshchikov (RUS)	0
Thomas Zander (GER)	3
Marcin Letki (POL)	1
Oleksandr Sardaryan (UKR)	2
Toomas Proovel (EST)	3
Bahadur Gaziyev (AZE)	1
Marko Asell (FIN)	6
David Millien (FRA)	0
Raatbek Sanatbayev (KGZ)	3

Quarterfinals
Behrouz Jamshidi (IRI)	1
Valery Tsilent (BLR)	0
Martin Lidberg (SWE)	0
Luis Enrique Méndez (CUB)	2
Thomas Zander (GER)	1
Toomas Proovel (EST)	0
Marko Asell (FIN)	6
Raatbek Sanatbayev (KGZ)	6

Semifinals
Behrouz Jamshidi (IRI)	2
Luis Enrique Méndez (CUB)	4
Thomas Zander (GER)	3
Raatbek Sanatbayev (KGZ)	2

Final
Luis Enrique Méndez (CUB)	5
Thomas Zander (GER)	1
Bronze medal match
Behrouz Jamshidi (IRI)	3
Raatbek Sanatbayev (KGZ)	1

- Behrouz Jamshidi of Iran originally won the bronze medal, but was disqualified after he tested positive for doping. Raatbek Sanatbayev was upgraded to the bronze medal position.
