= 2002 World Wrestling Championships – Men's Greco-Roman 84 kg =

Men's Greco-Roman 84 kg at the 2002 World Championships
- Venue: Universal Sports Hall CSKA
- Dates: 20–21 September 2002
- Competitors: 29 from 29 nations

Medalists
gold medal	Ara Abrahamian	Sweden
silver medal	Aleksandr Menshchikov	Russia
bronze medal	Mohamed Abdelfatah	Egypt

The men's Greco-Roman 84 kilograms is a competition featured at the 2002 World Wrestling Championships, and was held at the Universal Sports Hall CSKA in Moscow, Russia from 20 to 21 September 2002.

== Results ==
=== Preliminary round ===
==== Pool 1 ====
Pos	Athlete	Pld	W	L	CP	TP	GEO	HUN	GRE
1	Mukhran Vakhtangadze (GEO)	2	2	0	6	10	—	5–1	5–1
2	Sándor Bárdosi (HUN)	2	1	1	4	4	1–3 PP	—	3–0
3	Dimitrios Avramis (GRE)	2	0	2	1	1	1–3 PP	0–3 PO	—

Source: Official website

==== Pool 2 ====
Pos	Athlete	Pld	W	L	CP	TP	EGY	UKR	POL
1	Mohamed Abdelfatah (EGY)	2	2	0	7	15	—	5–1	10–0
2	Oleksandr Daragan (UKR)	2	1	1	4	7	1–3 PP	—	6–2
3	Bartłomiej Pryczkowski (POL)	2	0	2	1	2	0–4 ST	1–3 PP	—

Source: Official website

==== Pool 3 ====
Pos	Athlete	Pld	W	L	CP	TP	USA	EST	ITA
1	Brad Vering (USA)	2	2	0	7	14	—	4–0	10–0 Fall
2	Tarvi Thomberg (EST)	2	1	1	3	7	0–3 PO	—	7–0
3	Andrea Minguzzi (ITA)	2	0	2	0	0	0–4 TO	0–3 PO	—

Source: Official website

==== Pool 4 ====
Pos	Athlete	Pld	W	L	CP	TP	RUS	FIN	TUN
1	Aleksandr Menshchikov (RUS)	2	2	0	6	10	—	4–0	6–0
2	Tomi Rajamäki (FIN)	2	1	1	3	6	0–3 PO	—	6–0
3	Amor Bach Hamba (TUN)	2	0	2	0	0	0–3 PO	0–3 PO	—

Source: Official website

==== Pool 5 ====
Pos	Athlete	Pld	W	L	CP	TP	YUG	KAZ	CHN
1	Bojan Mijatov (YUG)	2	2	0	6	7	—	4–1	3–1
2	Yerlan Akhmetov (KAZ)	2	1	1	5	4	1–3 PP	—	3–0 Fall
3	Xu Jian (CHN)	2	0	2	1	1	1–3 PP	0–4 TO	—

Source: Official website

==== Pool 6 ====
Pos	Athlete	Pld	W	L	CP	TP	SWE	FRA	LTU
1	Ara Abrahamian (SWE)	2	2	0	7	14	—	11–0	3–0
2	Mélonin Noumonvi (FRA)	2	1	1	3	3	0–4 ST	—	3–1
3	Valdas Šidlauskas (LTU)	2	0	2	1	1	0–3 PO	1–3 PP	—

Source: Official website

==== Pool 7 ====
Pos	Athlete	Pld	W	L	CP	TP	TUR	JPN	KOR
1	Hamza Yerlikaya (TUR)	2	2	0	7	11	—	3–0	8–0 Fall
2	Shingo Matsumoto (JPN)	2	1	1	3	3	0–3 PO	—	3–0
3	Seo Sang-myun (KOR)	2	0	2	0	0	0–4 TO	0–3 PO	—

Source: Official website

==== Pool 8 ====
Pos	Athlete	Pld	W	L	CP	TP	ARM	BLR	BUL	UZB
1	Levon Geghamyan (ARM)	3	3	0	9	10	—	4–0	4–0	2–2
2	Viachaslau Makaranka (BLR)	3	2	1	6	5	0–3 PO	—	3–0	2–1
3	Vladislav Metodiev (BUL)	3	1	2	4	0	0–3 PO	0–3 PO	—	WO
4	Evgeniy Erofaylov (UZB)	3	0	3	2	3	1–3 PP	1–3 PP	0–4 PA	—

Source: Official website

==== Pool 9 ====
Pos	Athlete	Pld	W	L	CP	TP	ISR	GER	CUB	SVK
1	Gocha Tsitsiashvili (ISR)	3	3	0	9	9	—	5–3	2–0	2–0
2	Kai Dittrich (GER)	3	1	2	5	9	1–3 PP	—	4–4	2–3
3	Luis Enrique Méndez (CUB)	3	1	2	4	8	0–3 PO	1–3 PP	—	4–2
4	Attila Bátky (SVK)	3	1	2	4	5	0–3 PO	3–1 PP	1–3 PP	—

Source: Official website

=== Knockout round ===
Round of 16
Mukhran Vakhtangadze (GEO)	0
Mohamed Abdelfatah (EGY)	4

Quarterfinals
Mohamed Abdelfatah (EGY)	5
Brad Vering (USA)	1
Aleksandr Menshchikov (RUS)	5
Bojan Mijatov (YUG)	0
Ara Abrahamian (SWE)	3
Hamza Yerlikaya (TUR)	0
Levon Geghamyan (ARM)	3
Gocha Tsitsiashvili (ISR)	0

Semifinals
Mohamed Abdelfatah (EGY)	0
Aleksandr Menshchikov (RUS)	10
Ara Abrahamian (SWE)	6
Levon Geghamyan (ARM)	0

Final
Aleksandr Menshchikov (RUS)	1
Ara Abrahamian (SWE)	3
Bronze medal match
Mohamed Abdelfatah (EGY)	5
Levon Geghamyan (ARM)	0
