= 2003 World Wrestling Championships – Men's Greco-Roman 84 kg =

Men's Greco-Roman 84 kg at the 2003 World Championships
- Venue: Palais des Sports Robert Oubron
- Dates: 2–4 October 2003
- Competitors: 44 from 44 nations

Medalists
gold medal	Gocha Tsitsiashvili	Israel
silver medal	Ara Abrahamian	Sweden
bronze medal	Attila Bátky	Slovakia

The men's Greco-Roman 84 kilograms is a competition featured at the 2003 World Wrestling Championships, and was held at the Palais des Sports Robert Oubron in Créteil, France from 2 to 4 October 2003.

== Results ==
=== Preliminary round ===
==== Pool 1 ====
Pos	Athlete	Pld	W	L	CP	TP	GRE	ARM	IRI
1	Theodoros Tounousidis (GRE)	2	2	0	6	5	—	2–0	3–1
2	Levon Geghamyan (ARM)	2	1	1	3	3	0–3 PO	—	3–1
3	Behrouz Jamshidi (IRI)	2	0	2	2	2	1–3 PP	1–3 PP	—

Source: Official website

==== Pool 2 ====
Pos	Athlete	Pld	W	L	CP	TP	NOR	KOR	CRO
1	Fritz Aanes (NOR)	2	2	0	6	6	—	2–2	4–0
2	Bae Man-ku (KOR)	2	1	1	4	6	1–3 PP	—	4–0
3	Kosta Kostanjević (CRO)	2	0	2	0	0	0–3 PO	0–3 PO	—

Source: Official website

==== Pool 3 ====
Pos	Athlete	Pld	W	L	CP	TP	FIN	MDA	ITA
1	Tuomo Mäntylä (FIN)	2	1	1	5	16	—	14–0	2–6
2	Oleg Manea (MDA)	2	1	1	4	10	0–4 ST	—	10–0
3	Andrea Minguzzi (ITA)	2	1	1	3	6	3–1 PP	0–4 ST	—

Source: Official website

==== Pool 4 ====
Pos	Athlete	Pld	W	L	CP	TP	USA	CHN	SUI
1	Brad Vering (USA)	2	2	0	7	13	—	3–0	10–0
2	Li Daxin (CHN)	2	1	1	3	5	0–3 PO	—	5–0
3	Michael Jauch (SUI)	2	0	2	0	0	0–4 ST	0–3 PO	—

Source: Official website

==== Pool 5 ====
Pos	Athlete	Pld	W	L	CP	TP	CUB	GER	TUN
1	Luis Enrique Méndez (CUB)	2	2	0	7	17	—	12–0	5–0
2	Tim Nettekoven (GER)	2	1	1	3	3	0–4 ST	—	3–0
3	Amor Bach Hamba (TUN)	2	0	2	0	0	0–3 PO	0–3 PO	—

Source: Official website

==== Pool 6 ====
Pos	Athlete	Pld	W	L	CP	TP	TUR	JPN	AUS
1	Hamza Yerlikaya (TUR)	2	2	0	8	14	—	4–1	10–0 Fall
2	Shingo Matsumoto (JPN)	2	1	1	5	11	1–3 PP	—	10–0
3	Vitaly Ogulev (AUS)	2	0	2	0	0	0–4 TO	0–4 ST	—

Source: Official website

==== Pool 7 ====
Pos	Athlete	Pld	W	L	CP	TP	SWE	EGY	LTU
1	Ara Abrahamian (SWE)	2	2	0	6	9	—	3–2	6–0
2	Mohamed Abdelfatah (EGY)	2	1	1	5	12	1–3 PP	—	10–0
3	Valdas Šidlauskas (LTU)	2	0	2	0	0	0–3 PO	0–4 ST	—

Source: Official website

==== Pool 8 ====
Pos	Athlete	Pld	W	L	CP	TP	SCG	RUS	CZE
1	Bojan Mijatov (SCG)	2	1	1	4	6	—	3–1	3–4
2	Aleksey Mishin (RUS)	2	1	1	4	7	1–3 PP	—	6–0
3	Filip Soukup (CZE)	2	1	1	3	4	3–1 PP	0–3 PO	—

Source: Official website

==== Pool 9 ====
Pos	Athlete	Pld	W	L	CP	TP	FRA	KGZ	COL
1	Mélonin Noumonvi (FRA)	2	2	0	6	4	—	1–1	3–1
2	Janarbek Kenjeev (KGZ)	2	1	1	4	13	1–3 PP	—	12–4
3	Cristian Mosquera (COL)	2	0	2	2	5	1–3 PP	1–3 PP	—

Source: Official website

==== Pool 10 ====
Pos	Athlete	Pld	W	L	CP	TP	GEO	BUL	NED
1	Mukhran Vakhtangadze (GEO)	2	2	0	7	12	—	2–0	10–0
2	Vladislav Metodiev (BUL)	2	1	1	4	10	0–3 PO	—	10–0
3	Fred de Vos (NED)	2	0	2	0	0	0–4 ST	0–4 ST	—

Source: Official website

==== Pool 11 ====
Pos	Athlete	Pld	W	L	CP	TP	SWE	BUL	VEN
1	Attila Bátky (SVK)	2	2	0	7	12	—	2–1	10–0
2	Evgeniy Erofaylov (UZB)	2	1	1	5	7	1–3 PP	—	6–0 Fall
3	Chen Yung-cheng (TPE)	2	0	2	0	0	0–4 ST	0–4 TO	—

Source: Official website

==== Pool 12 ====
Pos	Athlete	Pld	W	L	CP	TP	EST	AUT	DEN
1	Tarvi Thomberg (EST)	2	2	0	6	7	—	3–1	4–0
2	Hannes Haring (AUT)	2	1	1	4	10	1–3 PP	—	9–6
3	Brian Jørgensen (DEN)	2	0	2	1	6	0–3 PO	1–3 PP	—

Source: Official website

==== Pool 13 ====
Pos	Athlete	Pld	W	L	CP	TP	BLR	KAZ	UKR	VEN
1	Viachaslau Makaranka (BLR)	3	3	0	9	12	—	3–1	4–1	5–1
2	Abdulla Zhabrailov (KAZ)	3	2	1	7	12	1–3 PP	—	6–4	5–1
3	Oleksandr Daragan (UKR)	3	1	2	6	15	1–3 PP	1–3 PP	—	10–0
4	Eddy Bartolozzi (VEN)	3	0	3	2	2	1–3 PP	1–3 PP	0–4 ST	—

Source: Official website

==== Pool 14 ====
Pos	Athlete	Pld	W	L	CP	TP	ISR	POL	HUN	POL
1	Gocha Tsitsiashvili (ISR)	3	2	1	8	31	—	1–1	2–3	28–0 Fall
2	Artur Michalkiewicz (POL)	3	2	1	8	16	1–3 PP	—	3–2	12–0 Fall
3	Balázs Kiss (HUN)	3	2	1	8	15	3–1 PP	1–3 PP	—	10–0
4	Satyadev Malik (IND)	3	0	3	0	0	0–4 TO	0–4 TO	0–4 ST	—

Source: Official website

=== Knockout round ===
Round of 16
Theodoros Tounousidis (GRE)	0
Fritz Aanes (NOR)	8
Tuomo Mäntylä (FIN)	0
Brad Vering (USA)	3
Luis Enrique Méndez (CUB)	0
Hamza Yerlikaya (TUR)	5
Ara Abrahamian (SWE)	3
Bojan Mijatov (SCG)	1
Mélonin Noumonvi (FRA)	3
Mukhran Vakhtangadze (GEO)	5
Attila Bátky (SVK)	4
Tarvi Thomberg (EST)	2

Quarterfinals
Fritz Aanes (NOR)	3
Brad Vering (USA)	2
Hamza Yerlikaya (TUR)	2
Ara Abrahamian (SWE)	2
Mukhran Vakhtangadze (GEO)	2
Attila Bátky (SVK)	2
Viachaslau Makaranka (BLR)	2
Gocha Tsitsiashvili (ISR)	3

Semifinals
Fritz Aanes (NOR)	0
Ara Abrahamian (SWE)	4
Attila Bátky (SVK)	0
Gocha Tsitsiashvili (ISR)	2

Final
Ara Abrahamian (SWE)	0
Gocha Tsitsiashvili (ISR)	2
Bronze medal match
Fritz Aanes (NOR)	2
Attila Bátky (SVK)	3
