= 1998 World Wrestling Championships – Men's Greco-Roman 85 kg =

Men's Greco-Roman 85 kg at the 1998 World Championships
- Venue: Gavlerinken
- Dates: 28–30 August 1998
- Competitors: 24 from 24 nations

Medalists
gold medal	Aleksandr Menshchikov	Russia
silver medal	János Kismoni	Hungary
bronze medal	Martin Lidberg	Sweden

The men's Greco-Roman 85 kilograms is a competition featured at the 1998 World Wrestling Championships, and was held at the Gavlerinken in Gävle, Sweden from 28 to 30 August 1998.

== Results ==
=== Round 1 ===
	Score	
Round of 32
Quincey Clark (USA)	2–4	Aleksandr Sidorenko (BLR)
Emzar Makaradze (GEO)	2–4	János Kismoni (HUN)
Christos Katsaros (GRE)	0–3	Ara Abrahamian (ARM)
Marko Asell (FIN)	4–1	Marcin Letki (POL)
Mohamed El-Hadad (FRA)	0–5	Behrouz Jamshidi (IRI)
Toomas Proovel (EST)	6–2 Fall	Oleksandr Sardaryan (UKR)
Hidekazu Yokoyama (JPN)	0–12	Hamza Yerlikaya (TUR)
Aleksandar Jovančević (YUG)	0–3	Raatbek Sanatbayev (KGZ)
Park Myung-suk (KOR)	0–3	Gocha Tsitsiashvili (ISR)
Thomas Zander (GER)	10–2	Salvatore Campanella (ITA)
Martin Lidberg (SWE)	1–2	Aleksandr Menshchikov (RUS)
Fritz Aanes (NOR)	3–1	Dai Ruifeng (CHN)

=== Round 2 ===
	Score	
Round of 16
Aleksandr Sidorenko (BLR)	0–1	János Kismoni (HUN)
Ara Abrahamian (ARM)	0–3	Marko Asell (FIN)
Behrouz Jamshidi (IRI)	3–0	Toomas Proovel (EST)
Hamza Yerlikaya (TUR)	3–0	Raatbek Sanatbayev (KGZ)
Gocha Tsitsiashvili (ISR)	1–0	Thomas Zander (GER)
Aleksandr Menshchikov (RUS)	9–0	Fritz Aanes (NOR)
Repechage
Quincey Clark (USA)	4–0	Emzar Makaradze (GEO)
Christos Katsaros (GRE)	0–4	Marcin Letki (POL)
Mohamed El-Hadad (FRA)	0–4	Oleksandr Sardaryan (UKR)
Hidekazu Yokoyama (JPN)	0–8	Aleksandar Jovančević (YUG)
Park Myung-suk (KOR)	3–0	Salvatore Campanella (ITA)
Martin Lidberg (SWE)	7–0	Dai Ruifeng (CHN)

=== Round 3 ===
	Score	
Quarterfinals
János Kismoni (HUN)	7–0	Marko Asell (FIN)
Behrouz Jamshidi (IRI)	0–11	Hamza Yerlikaya (TUR)
Gocha Tsitsiashvili (ISR)		Bye
Aleksandr Menshchikov (RUS)		Bye
Repechage
Quincey Clark (USA)	1–0	Marcin Letki (POL)
Oleksandr Sardaryan (UKR)	0–3	Aleksandar Jovančević (YUG)
Park Myung-suk (KOR)	0–11	Martin Lidberg (SWE)
Aleksandr Sidorenko (BLR)	3–0	Ara Abrahamian (ARM)
Toomas Proovel (EST)	0–2	Raatbek Sanatbayev (KGZ)
Thomas Zander (GER)	3–1	Fritz Aanes (NOR)

=== Round 4 ===
	Score	
Semifinals
János Kismoni (HUN)	3–2	Hamza Yerlikaya (TUR)
Gocha Tsitsiashvili (ISR)	1–2	Aleksandr Menshchikov (RUS)
Repechage
Quincey Clark (USA)	0–10	Aleksandar Jovančević (YUG)
Martin Lidberg (SWE)	2–0	Aleksandr Sidorenko (BLR)
Raatbek Sanatbayev (KGZ)	0–5	Thomas Zander (GER)
Marko Asell (FIN)	0–3	Behrouz Jamshidi (IRI)

=== Round 5 ===
	Score	
Repechage
Aleksandar Jovančević (YUG)	0–3	Martin Lidberg (SWE)
Thomas Zander (GER)	1–2	Behrouz Jamshidi (IRI)

=== Round 6 ===
	Score	
Repechage
Hamza Yerlikaya (TUR)	0–4	Martin Lidberg (SWE)
Gocha Tsitsiashvili (ISR)		Bye

=== Finals ===
	Score	
Bronze medal match
Martin Lidberg (SWE)	3–0	Gocha Tsitsiashvili (ISR)
Final
János Kismoni (HUN)	0–3	Aleksandr Menshchikov (RUS)
