= 1997 World Wrestling Championships – Men's Greco-Roman 85 kg =

Men's Greco-Roman 85 kg at the 1997 World Championships
- Venue: Hala Ludowa
- Dates: 11–13 September 1997
- Competitors: 29 from 29 nations

Medalists
gold medal	Sergey Tsvir	Russia
silver medal	Hamza Yerlikaya	Turkey
bronze medal	Thomas Zander	Germany

The men's Greco-Roman 85 kilograms is a competition featured at the 1997 World Wrestling Championships, and was held in Wrocław, Poland from 11 to 13 September 1997.

== Results ==
Legend

- WO — Won by walkover

=== Round 1 ===
	Score	
Round of 32
Tomi Rajamäki (FIN)	6–0	Dai Ruifeng (CHN)
Roman Meduna (SVK)	2–3	Toomas Proovel (EST)
Thomas Zander (GER)	3–0	Raatbek Sanatbayev (KGZ)
Christos Katsaros (GRE)	0–3	Salvatore Campanella (ITA)
Eddy Bartolozzi (VEN)	3–7	Henk van der Stoep (NED)
Aleksandar Jovančević (YUG)	2–3	Igor Bugai (UKR)
Hristo Stanchev (BUL)	1–3	Knut Isaksen (NOR)
Valery Tsilent (BLR)	4–1 Fall	Levon Geghamyan (ARM)
Hidekazu Yokoyama (JPN)	10–0	José Luis Ayala (MEX)
Ferenc Takács (HUN)	2–0	Park Myung-suk (KOR)
Martin Lidberg (SWE)	0–2	Dan Henderson (USA)
David Martinetti (SUI)	0–5	Jacek Fafiński (POL)
Filip Soukup (CZE)	0–7	Hamza Yerlikaya (TUR)
Sergey Tsvir (RUS)	4–2 Fall	Emzar Makaradze (GEO)
Gocha Tsitsiashvili (ISR)		Bye

=== Round 2 ===
	Score	
Round of 16
Gocha Tsitsiashvili (ISR)	2–0	Tomi Rajamäki (FIN)
Toomas Proovel (EST)	0–4	Thomas Zander (GER)
Salvatore Campanella (ITA)	4–0	Henk van der Stoep (NED)
Igor Bugai (UKR)	1–0	Knut Isaksen (NOR)
Valery Tsilent (BLR)	9–0	Hidekazu Yokoyama (JPN)
Ferenc Takács (HUN)	3–1	Dan Henderson (USA)
Jacek Fafiński (POL)	0–4	Hamza Yerlikaya (TUR)
Sergey Tsvir (RUS)		Bye
Repechage
Dai Ruifeng (CHN)	WO	Roman Meduna (SVK)
Raatbek Sanatbayev (KGZ)	5–0	Christos Katsaros (GRE)
Eddy Bartolozzi (VEN)	2–4	Aleksandar Jovančević (YUG)
Hristo Stanchev (BUL)	3–1	Levon Geghamyan (ARM)
José Luis Ayala (MEX)	1–11	Park Myung-suk (KOR)
Martin Lidberg (SWE)	6–0	David Martinetti (SUI)
Filip Soukup (CZE)	0–3	Emzar Makaradze (GEO)

=== Round 3 ===
	Score	
Quarterfinals
Sergey Tsvir (RUS)	3–1 Fall	Gocha Tsitsiashvili (ISR)
Thomas Zander (GER)	8–0	Salvatore Campanella (ITA)
Igor Bugai (UKR)	0–8	Valery Tsilent (BLR)
Ferenc Takács (HUN)	0–10	Hamza Yerlikaya (TUR)
Repechage
Raatbek Sanatbayev (KGZ)	5–4	Aleksandar Jovančević (YUG)
Hristo Stanchev (BUL)	1–3	Park Myung-suk (KOR)
Martin Lidberg (SWE)	4–1	Emzar Makaradze (GEO)
Tomi Rajamäki (FIN)	0–0	Toomas Proovel (EST)
Henk van der Stoep (NED)	0–3	Knut Isaksen (NOR)
Hidekazu Yokoyama (JPN)	1–7	Dan Henderson (USA)
Jacek Fafiński (POL)		Bye

=== Round 4 ===
	Score	
Repechage
Jacek Fafiński (POL)	0–5	Raatbek Sanatbayev (KGZ)
Park Myung-suk (KOR)	0–4	Martin Lidberg (SWE)
Tomi Rajamäki (FIN)	0–2	Knut Isaksen (NOR)
Dan Henderson (USA)	7–0	Gocha Tsitsiashvili (ISR)
Salvatore Campanella (ITA)	0–4 Fall	Igor Bugai (UKR)
Ferenc Takács (HUN)		Bye

=== Round 5 ===
	Score	
Semifinals
Sergey Tsvir (RUS)	3–0	Thomas Zander (GER)
Valery Tsilent (BLR)	0–3	Hamza Yerlikaya (TUR)
Repechage
Ferenc Takács (HUN)	4–0 Fall	Raatbek Sanatbayev (KGZ)
Martin Lidberg (SWE)	3–0	Knut Isaksen (NOR)
Dan Henderson (USA)	0–1	Igor Bugai (UKR)

=== Round 6 ===
	Score	
Repechage
Ferenc Takács (HUN)	0–3	Martin Lidberg (SWE)
Igor Bugai (UKR)		Bye

=== Round 7 ===
	Score	
Repechage
Thomas Zander (GER)	3–1	Igor Bugai (UKR)
Martin Lidberg (SWE)	1–0	Valery Tsilent (BLR)

=== Finals ===
	Score	
5th place match
Igor Bugai (UKR)	1–7	Valery Tsilent (BLR)
Bronze medal match
Thomas Zander (GER)	1–0	Martin Lidberg (SWE)
Final
Sergey Tsvir (RUS)	3–0	Hamza Yerlikaya (TUR)
