= 2001 World Wrestling Championships – Men's Greco-Roman 85 kg =

Men's Greco-Roman 85 kg at the 2001 World Championships
- Venue: Dimitris Tofalos Arena
- Dates: 7–9 December 2001
- Competitors: 29 from 29 nations

Medalists
| gold medal | Mukhran Vakhtangadze | Georgia |
| silver medal | Matt Lindland | United States |
| bronze medal | Oleksandr Daragan | Ukraine |

The men's Greco-Roman 85 kilograms is a competition featured at the 2001 World Wrestling Championships, and was held at the Dimitris Tofalos Arena in Patras, Greece from 7 to 9 December 2001.

== Results ==
=== Preliminary round ===
==== Pool 1 ====
| Pos | Athlete | Pld | W | L | CP | TP | TUR | ARM | CYP |
|---|---|---|---|---|---|---|---|---|---|
| 1 | Hamza Yerlikaya (TUR) | 2 | 2 | 0 | 7 | 7 | — | 7–2 | WO |
| 2 | Levon Geghamyan (ARM) | 2 | 1 | 1 | 5 | 24 | 1–3 PP | — | 22–0 Fall |
| 3 | Giannos Ioannou (CYP) | 2 | 0 | 2 | 0 | 0 | 0–4 PA | 0–4 TO | — |

Source: Japan Wrestling

==== Pool 2 ====
| Pos | Athlete | Pld | W | L | CP | TP | SWE | GER | FIN |
|---|---|---|---|---|---|---|---|---|---|
| 1 | Martin Lidberg (SWE) | 2 | 2 | 0 | 6 | 9 | — | 2–2 | 7–0 |
| 2 | Tim Nettekoven (GER) | 2 | 1 | 1 | 4 | 5 | 1–3 PP | — | 3–1 |
| 3 | Tomi Rajamäki (FIN) | 2 | 0 | 2 | 1 | 1 | 0–3 PO | 1–3 PP | — |

Source: Japan Wrestling

==== Pool 3 ====
| Pos | Athlete | Pld | W | L | CP | TP | GEO | SVK | BUL |
|---|---|---|---|---|---|---|---|---|---|
| 1 | Mukhran Vakhtangadze (GEO) | 2 | 2 | 0 | 6 | 8 | — | 3–1 | 5–0 |
| 2 | Attila Bátky (SVK) | 2 | 1 | 1 | 4 | 4 | 1–3 PP | — | 3–0 |
| 3 | Dimitar Stoyanov (BUL) | 2 | 0 | 2 | 0 | 0 | 0–3 PO | 0–3 PO | — |

Source: Japan Wrestling

==== Pool 4 ====
| Pos | Athlete | Pld | W | L | CP | TP | UKR | POL | CZE |
|---|---|---|---|---|---|---|---|---|---|
| 1 | Oleksandr Daragan (UKR) | 2 | 2 | 0 | 6 | 10 | — | 3–2 | 7–0 |
| 2 | Marcin Letki (POL) | 2 | 1 | 1 | 4 | 6 | 1–3 PP | — | 4–1 |
| 3 | Filip Soukup (CZE) | 2 | 0 | 2 | 1 | 1 | 0–3 PO | 1–3 PP | — |

Source: Japan Wrestling

==== Pool 5 ====
| Pos | Athlete | Pld | W | L | CP | TP | HUN | JPN | NED |
|---|---|---|---|---|---|---|---|---|---|
| 1 | Sándor Bárdosi (HUN) | 2 | 2 | 0 | 7 | 15 | — | 3–2 | 12–0 |
| 2 | Shingo Matsumoto (JPN) | 2 | 1 | 1 | 5 | 15 | 1–3 PP | — | 13–0 |
| 3 | Jerry van de Pol (NED) | 2 | 0 | 2 | 0 | 0 | 0–4 ST | 0–4 ST | — |

Source: Japan Wrestling

==== Pool 6 ====
| Pos | Athlete | Pld | W | L | CP | TP | USA | ISR | YUG |
|---|---|---|---|---|---|---|---|---|---|
| 1 | Matt Lindland (USA) | 2 | 2 | 0 | 6 | 13 | — | 6–2 | 7–0 |
| 2 | Gocha Tsitsiashvili (ISR) | 2 | 1 | 1 | 4 | 6 | 1–3 PP | — | 4–2 |
| 3 | Bojan Mijatov (YUG) | 2 | 0 | 2 | 1 | 2 | 0–3 PO | 1–3 PP | — |

Source: Japan Wrestling

==== Pool 7 ====
| Pos | Athlete | Pld | W | L | CP | TP | UZB | VEN | ISV |
|---|---|---|---|---|---|---|---|---|---|
| 1 | Evgeniy Erofaylov (UZB) | 2 | 2 | 0 | 7 | 8 | — | 3–0 | 5–0 Fall |
| 2 | Yorly Patiño (VEN) | 2 | 1 | 1 | 4 | 12 | 0–3 PO | — | 12–0 |
| 3 | Shaun Scott (ISV) | 2 | 0 | 2 | 0 | 0 | 0–4 TO | 0–4 ST | — |

Source: Japan Wrestling

==== Pool 8 ====
| Pos | Athlete | Pld | W | L | CP | TP | CUB | EST | KOR | GRE |
|---|---|---|---|---|---|---|---|---|---|---|
| 1 | Luis Enrique Méndez (CUB) | 3 | 3 | 0 | 9 | 18 | — | 4–0 | 9–3 | 5–0 |
| 2 | Toomas Proovel (EST) | 3 | 1 | 2 | 5 | 8 | 0–3 PO | — | 7–0 Ret | 1–3 |
| 3 | Bae Man-ku (KOR) | 3 | 1 | 2 | 5 | 6 | 1–3 PP | 0–4 PA | — | 3–2 Fall |
| 4 | Theofanis Anagnostou (GRE) | 3 | 1 | 2 | 3 | 5 | 0–3 PO | 3–1 PP | 0–4 TO | — |

Source: Japan Wrestling

==== Pool 9 ====
| Pos | Athlete | Pld | W | L | CP | TP | RUS | BLR | IRI | IND |
|---|---|---|---|---|---|---|---|---|---|---|
| 1 | Aleksandr Menshchikov (RUS) | 3 | 3 | 0 | 10 | 20 | — | 3–1 | 5–0 | 12–0 Fall |
| 2 | Viachaslau Makaranka (BLR) | 3 | 2 | 1 | 8 | 17 | 1–3 PP | — | 6–0 | 10–0 |
| 3 | Masoud Hashemzadeh (IRI) | 3 | 1 | 2 | 4 | 5 | 0–3 PO | 0–3 PO | — | 5–0 Fall |
| 4 | Govind Pawar (IND) | 3 | 0 | 3 | 0 | 0 | 0–4 TO | 0–4 ST | 0–4 TO | — |

Source: Japan Wrestling

=== Knockout round ===
Round of 16
Hamza Yerlikaya (TUR) | 4
Martin Lidberg (SWE) | 6

Quarterfinals
Martin Lidberg (SWE) | 2
Mukhran Vakhtangadze (GEO) | 3
Oleksandr Daragan (UKR) | 3
Sándor Bárdosi (HUN) | 2
Matt Lindland (USA) | 11
Evgeniy Erofaylov (UZB) | 0
Luis Enrique Méndez (CUB) | 2
Aleksandr Menshchikov (RUS) | 3

Semifinals
Mukhran Vakhtangadze (GEO) | 3
Oleksandr Daragan (UKR) | 0
Matt Lindland (USA) | 6
Aleksandr Menshchikov (RUS) | 2

Final
Mukhran Vakhtangadze (GEO) | 2
Matt Lindland (USA) | 1
Bronze medal match
Oleksandr Daragan (UKR) | 3
Aleksandr Menshchikov (RUS) | 2
