= 2005 World Wrestling Championships – Men's Greco-Roman 84 kg =

Men's Greco-Roman 84 kg at the 2005 World Championships
- Venue: László Papp Budapest Sports Arena
- Dates: 1 October 2005
- Competitors: 39 from 39 nations

Medalists
gold medal	Alim Selimau	Belarus
silver medal	Aleksey Mishin	Russia
bronze medal	Sándor Bárdosi	Hungary
bronze medal	Nazmi Avluca	Turkey

The men's Greco-Roman 84 kilograms is a competition featured at the 2005 World Wrestling Championships, and was held at the László Papp Budapest Sports Arena in Budapest, Hungary on 1 October 2005.

== Results ==
Legend

- C — Won by 3 cautions given to the opponent
- F — Won by fall

=== Finals ===
Semifinals				Final
Alim Selimau (BLR)	1	4^{C}
Sándor Bárdosi (HUN)	2	0		Alim Selimau (BLR)	1	1	2
Oleksandr Daragan (UKR)	1	4	0	Aleksey Mishin (RUS)	4	1	2
Aleksey Mishin (RUS)	5	4	6

=== Top half ===
==== Section 1 ====
Round of 64

Round of 32
Alim Selimau (BLR)	6	6
Nenad Žugaj (CRO)	0	0
Tuomo Mäntylä (FIN)	0	0
Janarbek Kenjeev (KGZ)	5	2
Kim Jung-sub (KOR)	2	2^{C}
Björn Holk (GER)	0	0
Abdulla Zhabrailov (KAZ)	0	5	4
Pavel Burlă (ROM)	6	0	3

Round of 16
Alim Selimau (BLR)	2	2
Janarbek Kenjeev (KGZ)	1	1
Kim Jung-sub (KOR)	1	4
Abdulla Zhabrailov (KAZ)	1	0

Quarterfinals
Alim Selimau (BLR)	5	2
Kim Jung-sub (KOR)	0	1

==== Section 2 ====
Round of 64

Round of 32
Brad Vering (USA)	1	0
Ntante Charempasvili (GRE)	2	4^{F}
Robertas Budris (LTU)	0	5	1
Denis Zdorikov (UZB)	3	4	2
Deni Lipić (SWE)	0	0
Tarvi Thomberg (EST)	2	4
Sándor Bárdosi (HUN)	2	4^{F}
Yasha Manasherov (ISR)	0	0

Round of 16
Ntante Charempasvili (GRE)	5	1	1
Denis Zdorikov (UZB)	0	1	1
Tarvi Thomberg (EST)	1	0
Sándor Bárdosi (HUN)	1	5^{C}

Quarterfinals
Ntante Charempasvili (GRE)	0	0
Sándor Bárdosi (HUN)	5	3

=== Bottom half ===
==== Section 3 ====
Round of 64

Round of 32
Kemal Tajić (BIH)	0	0
Mohamed Abdelfatah (EGY)	6	6
Oleksandr Daragan (UKR)	3	6
Mats Rolfsen (NOR)	0	0
Badri Khasaia (GEO)	3	3	2
Mélonin Noumonvi (FRA)	0	3	0
Ghasem Rezaei (IRI)	2	1	1
Shingo Matsumoto (JPN)	3	1	1^{C}

Round of 16
Mohamed Abdelfatah (EGY)	5	0	2
Oleksandr Daragan (UKR)	0	3	4
Badri Khasaia (GEO)	1	1	1
Shingo Matsumoto (JPN)	1	1	6^{F}

Quarterfinals
Oleksandr Daragan (UKR)	0	1	4
Shingo Matsumoto (JPN)	5	1	0

==== Section 4 ====
Round of 64
Nazmi Avluca (TUR)	4	4
Jure Kuhar (SLO)	2	0
Luis Enrique Méndez (CUB)	5	4
Jean Ramírez (VEN)	0	0
Aleksey Mishin (RUS)	2	4
Amor Bach Hamba (TUN)	0	0
Attila Bátky (SVK)	0	2	0
Arman Geghamyan (ARM)	4	0	3^{C}
Michael Jauch (SUI)	0	1
Artur Michalkiewicz (POL)	4	6
Ahmad El-Habeche (LIB)	0	0
Fred de Vos (NED)	6	3
Hannes Haring (AUT)	1	0
Ma Sanyi (CHN)	5	6

Round of 32
Sanjay Kumar (IND)	0	0
Nazmi Avluca (TUR)	6	7
Luis Enrique Méndez (CUB)	0	0
Aleksey Mishin (RUS)	4	5
Arman Geghamyan (ARM)	1	4	0
Artur Michalkiewicz (POL)	4	0	3
Fred de Vos (NED)	0	2
Ma Sanyi (CHN)	2	4

Round of 16
Nazmi Avluca (TUR)	0	6	0
Aleksey Mishin (RUS)	2	0	4
Artur Michalkiewicz (POL)	1	1	1^{C}
Ma Sanyi (CHN)	1	1	0

Quarterfinals
Aleksey Mishin (RUS)	1	4^{C}
Artur Michalkiewicz (POL)	1	1

=== Repechage ===
Repechage round 1
Amor Bach Hamba (TUN)	3	2	0
Luis Enrique Méndez (CUB)	2	9	6^{C}

Repechage round 2
Nenad Žugaj (CRO)	0	0
Janarbek Kenjeev (KGZ)	3	4
Luis Enrique Méndez (CUB)	2	0
Nazmi Avluca (TUR)	5	7

Repechage round 3
Janarbek Kenjeev (KGZ)	0	1
Kim Jung-sub (KOR)	6	4
Nazmi Avluca (TUR)	6	3
Artur Michalkiewicz (POL)	0	1

Bronze medals
Kim Jung-sub (KOR)	0	0
Sándor Bárdosi (HUN)	3	6
Nazmi Avluca (TUR)	5	4
Oleksandr Daragan (UKR)	0	0
