= Wrestling at the 2000 Summer Olympics – Men's Greco-Roman 85 kg =

Men's Greco-Roman 85 kg at the Games of the XXVII Olympiad
- Venue: Sydney Convention and Exhibition Centre
- Date: 25–27 September 2000
- Competitors: 20 from 20 nations

Medalists
1st place, gold medalist(s)		Hamza Yerlikaya	Turkey
2nd place, silver medalist(s)		Sándor Bárdosi	Hungary
3rd place, bronze medalist(s)		Mukhran Vakhtangadze	Georgia

The men's Greco-Roman 85 kilograms at the 2000 Summer Olympics as part of the wrestling program was held at the Sydney Convention and Exhibition Centre from September 25 to 27. The competition held with an elimination system of three or four wrestlers in each pool, with the winners qualify for the quarterfinals, semifinals and final by way of direct elimination.

== Schedule ==
All times are Australian Eastern Daylight Time (UTC+11:00)

Date	Time	Event
25 September 2000	09:30	Round 1
25 September 2000	17:00	Round 2
26 September 2000	09:30	Round 3
27 September 2000	09:30	Quarterfinals
27 September 2000	09:30	Semifinals
27 September 2000	17:00	Finals

== Results ==
Legend

- WO — Won by walkover

=== Elimination pools ===
==== Pool 1 ====
Pos	Athlete	Pld	W	L	CP	TP	Qualification
1	Hamza Yerlikaya (TUR)	2	2	0	7	15	Knockout round
2	Thomas Zander (GER)	2	1	1	4	4	
3	Marko Asell (FIN)	2	0	2	1	1	

Source: Official Report

	Score		CP
Marko Asell (FIN)	1–3	Thomas Zander (GER)	1–3 PP
Hamza Yerlikaya (TUR)	10–0	Marko Asell (FIN)	4–0 ST
Thomas Zander (GER)	1–5	Hamza Yerlikaya (TUR)	1–3 PP

==== Pool 2 ====
Pos	Athlete	Pld	W	L	CP	TP	Qualification
1	Luis Enrique Méndez (CUB)	2	2	0	6	9	Knockout round
2	Mohamed Abdelfatah (EGY)	2	1	1	5	15	
3	Quincey Clark (USA)	2	0	2	0	0	

Source: Official Report

	Score		CP
Quincey Clark (USA)	0–5	Luis Enrique Méndez (CUB)	0–3 PO
Mohamed Abdelfatah (EGY)	12–0	Quincey Clark (USA)	4–0 ST
Luis Enrique Méndez (CUB)	4–3	Mohamed Abdelfatah (EGY)	3–1 PP

==== Pool 3 ====
Pos	Athlete	Pld	W	L	CP	TP	Qualification
1	Valery Tsilent (BLR)	2	1	1	4	4	Knockout round
2	Aleksandr Menshchikov (RUS)	2	1	1	3 (Note: Head-to-head result: RUS 3–0 UKR.)	2	
3	Vyacheslav Oliynyk (UKR)	2	1	1	3	6	

Source: Official Report
Notes:

	Score		CP
Aleksandr Menshchikov (RUS)	0–3	Valery Tsilent (BLR)	0–3 PO
Vyacheslav Oliynyk (UKR)	0–2	Aleksandr Menshchikov (RUS)	0–3 PO
Valery Tsilent (BLR)	1–6	Vyacheslav Oliynyk (UKR)	1–3 PP

==== Pool 4 ====
Pos	Athlete	Pld	W	L	CP	TP	Qualification
1	Mukhran Vakhtangadze (GEO)	2	2	0	6	8	Knockout round
2	Toomas Proovel (EST)	2	1	1	4	8	
3	Raatbek Sanatbayev (KGZ)	2	0	2	2	3	

Source: Official Report

	Score		CP
Toomas Proovel (EST)	4–6	Mukhran Vakhtangadze (GEO)	1–3 PP
Raatbek Sanatbayev (KGZ)	2–4	Toomas Proovel (EST)	1–3 PP
Mukhran Vakhtangadze (GEO)	2–1	Raatbek Sanatbayev (KGZ)	3–1 PP

==== Pool 5 ====
Pos	Athlete	Pld	W	L	CP	TP	Qualification
1	Sándor Bárdosi (HUN)	3	3	0	10	19	Knockout round
2	Martin Lidberg (SWE)	3	2	1	7	3	
3	Eddy Bartolozzi (VEN)	3	1	2	4	5	
4	Arek Olczak (AUS)	3	0	3	0	0	

Source: Official Report

	Score		CP
Sándor Bárdosi (HUN)	2–0	Martin Lidberg (SWE)	3–0 PO
Arek Olczak (AUS)	0–3	Eddy Bartolozzi (VEN)	0–3 PO
Sándor Bárdosi (HUN)	12–0	Arek Olczak (AUS)	4–0 ST
Martin Lidberg (SWE)	3–2	Eddy Bartolozzi (VEN)	3–1 PP
Sándor Bárdosi (HUN)	5–0	Eddy Bartolozzi (VEN)	3–0 PO
Martin Lidberg (SWE)	WO	Arek Olczak (AUS)	4–0 PA

==== Pool 6 ====
Pos	Athlete	Pld	W	L	CP	TP	Qualification
1	Fritz Aanes (NOR)	3	3	0	10	25	Knockout round
2	Gocha Tsitsiashvili (ISR)	3	2	1	8	16	
3	Yury Vitt (UZB)	3	1	2	4	5	
4	Amor Bach Hamba (TUN)	3	0	3	2	2	

Source: Official Report

	Score		CP
Gocha Tsitsiashvili (ISR)	2–7	Fritz Aanes (NOR)	1–3 PP
Yury Vitt (UZB)	4–1	Amor Bach Hamba (TUN)	3–1 PP
Gocha Tsitsiashvili (ISR)	3–0	Yury Vitt (UZB)	3–0 PO
Fritz Aanes (NOR)	12–0	Amor Bach Hamba (TUN)	4–0 ST
Gocha Tsitsiashvili (ISR)	11–1	Amor Bach Hamba (TUN)	4–1 SP
Fritz Aanes (NOR)	6–1	Yury Vitt (UZB)	3–1 PP

=== Knockout round ===
Quarterfinals
Hamza Yerlikaya (TUR)	3
Luis Enrique Méndez (CUB)	0
Valery Tsilent (BLR)	5
Mukhran Vakhtangadze (GEO)	6

Semifinals
Hamza Yerlikaya (TUR)	3
Mukhran Vakhtangadze (GEO)	0
Sándor Bárdosi (HUN)	4
Fritz Aanes (NOR)	1

Gold medal match
Hamza Yerlikaya (TUR)	3
Sándor Bárdosi (HUN)	3
Bronze medal match
Mukhran Vakhtangadze (GEO)	4
Fritz Aanes (NOR)	0

Classification 5th–6th
Luis Enrique Méndez (CUB)	0
Valery Tsilent (BLR)	4

== Final standing ==
Rank	Athlete
1st place, gold medalist(s)	Hamza Yerlikaya (TUR)
2nd place, silver medalist(s)	Sándor Bárdosi (HUN)
3rd place, bronze medalist(s)	Mukhran Vakhtangadze (GEO)
4	Valery Tsilent (BLR)
5	Luis Enrique Méndez (CUB)
6	Gocha Tsitsiashvili (ISR)
7	Martin Lidberg (SWE)
8	Mohamed Abdelfatah (EGY)
9	Toomas Proovel (EST)
10	Yury Vitt (UZB)
11	Eddy Bartolozzi (VEN)
12	Thomas Zander (GER)
13	Aleksandr Menshchikov (RUS)
14	Vyacheslav Oliynyk (UKR)
15	Raatbek Sanatbayev (KGZ)
16	Amor Bach Hamba (TUN)
17	Marko Asell (FIN)
18	Arek Olczak (AUS)
19	Quincey Clark (USA)
DQ	Fritz Aanes (NOR)

- Fritz Aanes of Norway originally placed fourth, but was disqualified after he tested positive for Nandrolone.
