= 2005 World Wrestling Championships – Men's Greco-Roman 96 kg =

Men's Greco-Roman 96 kg at the 2005 World Championships
- Venue: László Papp Budapest Sports Arena
- Dates: 2 October 2005
- Competitors: 32 from 32 nations

Medalists
gold medal	Hamza Yerlikaya	Turkey
silver medal	Lajos Virág	Hungary
bronze medal	Vasily Teploukhov	Russia
bronze medal	Justin Ruiz	United States

The men's Greco-Roman 96 kilograms is a competition featured at the 2005 World Wrestling Championships, and was held at the László Papp Budapest Sports Arena in Budapest, Hungary on 2 October 2005.

This Greco-Roman wrestling competition consists of a single-elimination tournament, with a repechage used to determine the winner of two bronze medals.

== Results ==
Legend

- C — Won by 3 cautions given to the opponent
- F — Won by fall

=== Final ===
Final
Hamza Yerlikaya (TUR)	2	4
Lajos Virág (HUN)	1	1

=== Top half ===
Round of 32
Hamza Yerlikaya (TUR)	1	5	1^{C}
Fritz Aanes (NOR)	2	0	0
Shaun Scott (ISV)	0	0
Marek Sitnik (POL)	7	3^{F}
Niko Liulamaga (ASA)	0	0
Guillermo Talavera (VEN)	8	7
Roman Meduna (SVK)	0	1
Mirko Englich (GER)	4	1^{C}
Vasily Teploukhov (RUS)	6	1^{C}
Jimmy Lidberg (SWE)	0	0
Reza Zeidvand (IRI)	1	1
Mukhran Vakhtangadze (GEO)	1	1
Sanjit Kumar (IND)	0
Mikhail Nikolayev (UKR)	4^{F}
Chen Xiaofei (CHN)	3	1	0
Rami Hietaniemi (FIN)	1	4	4^{C}

Round of 16
Hamza Yerlikaya (TUR)	4	2
Marek Sitnik (POL)	0	0
Guillermo Talavera (VEN)	1	0
Mirko Englich (GER)	1	3
Vasily Teploukhov (RUS)	2	5^{C}
Reza Zeidvand (IRI)	1	0
Mikhail Nikolayev (UKR)	0	6	4
Rami Hietaniemi (FIN)	4	0	1

Quarterfinals
Hamza Yerlikaya (TUR)	2	4
Mirko Englich (GER)	0	0
Vasily Teploukhov (RUS)	2	3
Mikhail Nikolayev (UKR)	1	1

Semifinals
Hamza Yerlikaya (TUR)	4	4
Vasily Teploukhov (RUS)	0	0

=== Bottom half ===
Round of 32
Robert Petrosyan (ARM)	1	0
Margulan Assembekov (KAZ)	2	3^{C}
Georgios Koutsioumpas (GRE)	6	5
Samuel Shamilov (ISR)	0	0
Vladislav Metodiev (BUL)	6	8
Kenzo Kato (JPN)	0	0
Toomas Proovel (EST)	1	2
Valdas Šidlauskas (LTU)	1	0
Mitja Sedmak (SLO)	0	3	0
Lajos Virág (HUN)	9	1	6^{C}
Daigoro Timoncini (ITA)	0	2	3
Shata Narmaniya (BLR)	2	2	4
Marek Švec (CZE)	6	3^{F}
Bojan Mijatov (SCG)	1	0
Azamat Erkimbaev (KGZ)	0	0
Justin Ruiz (USA)	4	1^{C}

Round of 16
Margulan Assembekov (KAZ)	8	4
Georgios Koutsioumpas (GRE)	0	1
Vladislav Metodiev (BUL)	6	3^{C}
Toomas Proovel (EST)	0	0
Lajos Virág (HUN)	3	5
Shata Narmaniya (BLR)	1	0
Marek Švec (CZE)	0	5	1
Justin Ruiz (USA)	3	0	1

Quarterfinals
Margulan Assembekov (KAZ)	6	5^{C}
Vladislav Metodiev (BUL)	0	0
Lajos Virág (HUN)	4	1
Justin Ruiz (USA)	0	1

Semifinals
Margulan Assembekov (KAZ)	0	0
Lajos Virág (HUN)	3	2

=== Repechage ===
Repechage round 1
Fritz Aanes (NOR)	3	2	5
Marek Sitnik (POL)	3	1	0
Mitja Sedmak (SLO)	0	0
Shata Narmaniya (BLR)	3	4

Repechage round 2
Fritz Aanes (NOR)	6	0	0
Mirko Englich (GER)	0	7	6
Shata Narmaniya (BLR)	1	0
Justin Ruiz (USA)	3	2

Bronze medals
Mirko Englich (GER)	0	1	0
Vasily Teploukhov (RUS)	4	1	2
Justin Ruiz (USA)	1	1	1^{C}
Margulan Assembekov (KAZ)	1	1	0
