= Wrestling at the 2004 Summer Olympics – Men's Greco-Roman 84 kg =

Men's Greco-Roman 84 kg at the Games of the XXVIII Olympiad
- Venue: Ano Liosia Olympic Hall
- Date: 24–25 August 2004
- Competitors: 20 from 20 nations

Medalists
1st place, gold medalist(s)		Aleksey Mishin	Russia
2nd place, silver medalist(s)		Ara Abrahamian	Sweden
3rd place, bronze medalist(s)		Viachaslau Makaranka	Belarus

The men's Greco-Roman 84 kilograms at the 2004 Summer Olympics as part of the wrestling program were held at the Ano Liosia Olympic Hall, from August 24 to August 25.

The competition was held with an elimination system of three or four wrestlers in each pool, with the winners qualifying for the quarterfinals, semifinals, and final by way of direct elimination.

Pelle Svensson, a former two-time world champion (Greco-Roman 100 kg class) and member of the board of FILA from 1990 to 2007, has described FILA as an inherently corrupt organization. During the 2004 Summer Olympics in Athens, Svensson served as chairman of the disciplinary committee of FILA. As he was watching the final in the men's Greco-Roman wrestling 84 kg class between Aleksey Mishin from Russia and Ara Abrahamian from Sweden, Svensson witnessed how the 1988 Soviet Olympic champion and Russian team leader Mikhail Mamiashvili was giving signs to the referee. When Svensson approached him and informed him that this was not allowed according to the rules, Mamiashvili responded by saying: "you should know that this may lead to your death". Svensson later found proof that the Romanian referee was bribed (according to Svensson the referee had received over one million Swedish krona).

== Schedule ==
All times are Eastern European Summer Time (UTC+03:00)

Date	Time	Event
24 August 2004	09:30	Round 1
24 August 2004	09:30	Round 2
24 August 2004	17:30	Round 3
24 August 2004	17:30	Qualification
25 August 2004	09:30	Semifinals
25 August 2004	17:30	Finals

== Results ==
Legend

- D — Disqualified
- WO — Won by walkover

=== Elimination pools ===
==== Pool 1 ====
Pos	Athlete	Pld	W	L	CP	TP	Qualification
1	Viachaslau Makaranka (BLR)	2	2	0	7	6	Knockout round
2	Levon Geghamyan (ARM)	2	1	1	4	11	
3	Andrea Minguzzi (ITA)	2	0	2	0	0	

Source: Official website

	Score		CP
Levon Geghamyan (ARM)	0–3	Viachaslau Makaranka (BLR)	0–3 PO
Andrea Minguzzi (ITA)	0–11	Levon Geghamyan (ARM)	0–4 ST
Viachaslau Makaranka (BLR)	3–0 Fall	Andrea Minguzzi (ITA)	4–0 TO

==== Pool 2 ====
Pos	Athlete	Pld	W	L	CP	TP	Qualification
1	Mohamed Abdelfatah (EGY)	2	2	0	6	7	Knockout round
2	Brad Vering (USA)	2	1	1	4	0	
3	Mukhran Vakhtangadze (GEO)	2	0	2	0	0	

Source: Official website

	Score		CP
Mohamed Abdelfatah (EGY)	3–0	Mukhran Vakhtangadze (GEO)	3–0 PO
Brad Vering (USA)	0–4	Mohamed Abdelfatah (EGY)	0–3 PO
Mukhran Vakhtangadze (GEO)	WO	Brad Vering (USA)	0–4 PA

==== Pool 3 ====
Pos	Athlete	Pld	W	L	CP	TP	Qualification
1	Dimitrios Avramis (GRE)	2	2	0	6	8	Knockout round
2	Behrouz Jamshidi (IRI)	2	1	1	4	4	
3	Fritz Aanes (NOR)	2	0	2	1	1	

Source: Official website

	Score		CP
Dimitrios Avramis (GRE)	5–1	Fritz Aanes (NOR)	3–1 PP
Behrouz Jamshidi (IRI)	1–3	Dimitrios Avramis (GRE)	1–3 PP
Fritz Aanes (NOR)	0–3	Behrouz Jamshidi (IRI)	0–3 PO

==== Pool 4 ====
Pos	Athlete	Pld	W	L	CP	TP	Qualification
1	Aleksey Mishin (RUS)	2	2	0	6	6	Knockout round
2	Gocha Tsitsiashvili (ISR)	2	1	1	3	3	
3	Mélonin Noumonvi (FRA)	2	0	2	1	1	

Source: Official website

	Score		CP
Gocha Tsitsiashvili (ISR)	3–1	Mélonin Noumonvi (FRA)	3–1 PP
Aleksey Mishin (RUS)	3–0	Gocha Tsitsiashvili (ISR)	3–0 PO
Mélonin Noumonvi (FRA)	0–3	Aleksey Mishin (RUS)	0–3 PO

==== Pool 5 ====
Pos	Athlete	Pld	W	L	CP	TP	Qualification
1	Hamza Yerlikaya (TUR)	3	3	0	10	12	Knockout round
2	Oleksandr Daragan (UKR)	3	2	1	8	6	
3	Vladislav Metodiev (BUL)	3	1	2	3	5	
4	Tarvi Thomberg (EST)	3	0	3	0	0	

Source: Official website

	Score		CP
Hamza Yerlikaya (TUR)	4–1	Oleksandr Daragan (UKR)	3–1 PP
Vladislav Metodiev (BUL)	3–0	Tarvi Thomberg (EST)	3–0 PO
Hamza Yerlikaya (TUR)	5–2 Ret	Vladislav Metodiev (BUL)	4–0 PA
Oleksandr Daragan (UKR)	5–0	Tarvi Thomberg (EST)	3–0 PO
Hamza Yerlikaya (TUR)	3–0	Tarvi Thomberg (EST)	3–0 PO
Oleksandr Daragan (UKR)	WO	Vladislav Metodiev (BUL)	4–0 PA

==== Pool 6 ====
Pos	Athlete	Pld	W	L	CP	TP	Qualification
1	Ara Abrahamian (SWE)	3	3	0	9	13	Knockout round
2	Shingo Matsumoto (JPN)	3	2	1	6	10	
3	Attila Bátky (SVK)	3	1	2	4	4	
4	Janarbek Kenjeev (KGZ)	3	0	3	3	4	

Source: Official website

	Score		CP
Attila Bátky (SVK)	3–1	Janarbek Kenjeev (KGZ)	3–1 PP
Ara Abrahamian (SWE)	5–0	Shingo Matsumoto (JPN)	3–0 PO
Attila Bátky (SVK)	0–4	Ara Abrahamian (SWE)	0–3 PO
Janarbek Kenjeev (KGZ)	1–7	Shingo Matsumoto (JPN)	1–3 PP
Attila Bátky (SVK)	1–3	Shingo Matsumoto (JPN)	1–3 PP
Janarbek Kenjeev (KGZ)	2–4	Ara Abrahamian (SWE)	1–3 PP

=== Knockout round ===
Qualification
Viachaslau Makaranka (BLR)	2
Mohamed Abdelfatah (EGY)	0^{D}
Dimitrios Avramis (GRE)	2
Aleksey Mishin (RUS)	5

Semifinals
Viachaslau Makaranka (BLR)	0
Aleksey Mishin (RUS)	6
Hamza Yerlikaya (TUR)	0
Ara Abrahamian (SWE)	3

Gold medal match
Aleksey Mishin (RUS)	1
Ara Abrahamian (SWE)	1
Bronze medal match
Viachaslau Makaranka (BLR)	2
Hamza Yerlikaya (TUR)	1

Classification 5–6
Mohamed Abdelfatah (EGY)
Dimitrios Avramis (GRE)	WO

== Final standing ==
Rank	Athlete
1st place, gold medalist(s)	Aleksey Mishin (RUS)
2nd place, silver medalist(s)	Ara Abrahamian (SWE)
3rd place, bronze medalist(s)	Viachaslau Makaranka (BLR)
4	Hamza Yerlikaya (TUR)
5	Dimitrios Avramis (GRE)
6	Oleksandr Daragan (UKR)
7	Shingo Matsumoto (JPN)
8	Levon Geghamyan (ARM)
9	Behrouz Jamshidi (IRI)
10	Attila Bátky (SVK)
11	Brad Vering (USA)
12	Vladislav Metodiev (BUL)
13	Janarbek Kenjeev (KGZ)
14	Gocha Tsitsiashvili (ISR)
15	Fritz Aanes (NOR)
16	Mélonin Noumonvi (FRA)
17	Andrea Minguzzi (ITA)
18	Mukhran Vakhtangadze (GEO)
19	Tarvi Thomberg (EST)
DQ	Mohamed Abdelfatah (EGY)

- Mohamed Abdelfatah was ejected from the competition for unsportsmanlike conduct following his protest after the end of his quarterfinal bout against Makaranka.
