= Israel at the 2000 Summer Olympics =

- IOC code: ISR
- NOC: Olympic Committee of Israel
- Website: www.olympicsil.co.il (in Hebrew and English)

in Sydney
- Competitors: 39 (29 men and 10 women) in 9 sports
- Flag bearer: Rogel Nachum
- Medals Ranked 71st: Gold 0 Silver 0 Bronze 1 Total 1

Summer Olympics appearances (overview)
- 1952; 1956; 1960; 1964; 1968; 1972; 1976; 1980; 1984; 1988; 1992; 1996; 2000; 2004; 2008; 2012; 2016; 2020; 2024

Israel competed at the 2000 Summer Olympics in Sydney, Australia. 39 competitors, 29 men and 10 women, took part in 43 events in 9 sports. The delegation of 39 athletes was the biggest at the time, and third-biggest in history, after 2008 with 40 and 2016 with 47.

== Medalists ==
Medal	Name	Sport	Event	Date
Bronze	Michael Kolganov	Canoeing	Men's K1 500m	October 11

== Athletics ==
=== Men's track ===
Athlete	Event	Heat		Quarterfinal		Semifinal		Final	
Athlete	Event	Result	Rank	Result	Rank	Result	Rank	Result	Rank
Tommy Kafri	100m	10.43	4	Did not advance					
Gidon Jablonka	200m	20.92	5	Did not advance					
Kfir Golan; Gidon Jablonka; Tommy Kafri; Aleksandr Porkhomovskiy	4 × 100 m relay	39.76	6	Did not advance					

=== Men's field ===
Athlete	Event	Qualification		Final	
Athlete	Event	Distance	Position	Distance	Position
Konstantin Matusevich	High jump	2.27	1 q	2.32	5
Aleksandr Averbukh	Pole vault	5.65	7 q	5.50	10
Danny Krasnov	Pole vault	5.55	20	Did not advance	
Rogel Nachum	Triple jump	16.39	23	Did not advance	

== Canoeing ==
Athlete	Event	Heats		Semifinals		Final	
Athlete	Event	Time	Rank	Time	Rank	Time	Rank
Michael Kolganov	Men's K-1 500m	1:40.275	2 Q	1:40.426	3 Q	1:59.563	3rd place, bronze medalist(s)
Michael Kolganov	Men's K-1 1000m	3:35.487	1 Q	3:37.439	3 Q	3:35.099	4
Roei Yellin; Rami Zur	Men's K-2 500m	1:34.774	5 q	1:34.241	8	Did not advance	
Roei Yellin; Rami Zur	Men's K-2 1000m	3:20.913	8 q	3:22.634	7	Did not advance	
Lior Carmi; Larisa Pesyakhovich	Women's K-2 500m	1:48.647	6 q	1:48.120	5	Did not advance	

== Fencing ==
Athlete	Event	Round of 64	Round of 32	Round of 16	Quarterfinal	Semifinal	Final / BM	
Athlete	Event	Opposition Score	Opposition Score	Opposition Score	Opposition Score	Opposition Score	Opposition Score	Rank
Ayelet Ohayon	Women's foil	Bye	Wuillème (FRA); W 15-12	Bianchedi (ITA); L 12-15	Did not advance			

== Judo ==
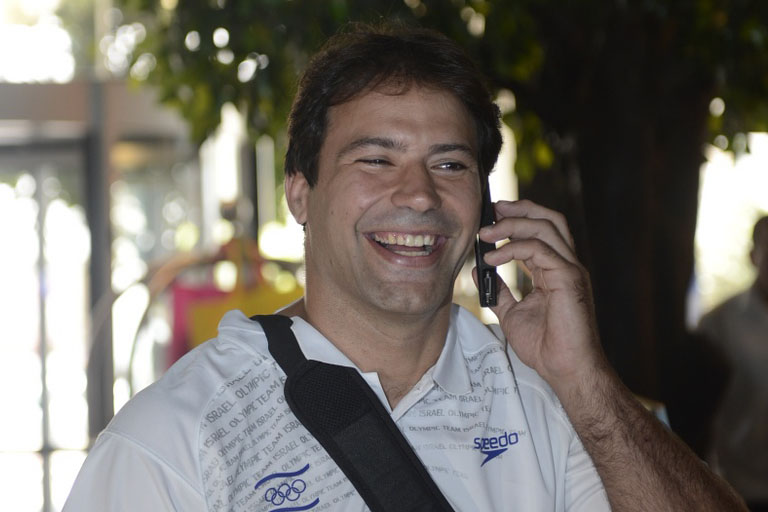
Arik Zeevi

Athlete	Event	Round of 32	Round of 16	Quarterfinals	Semifinals	Repechage 1	Repechage 2	Repechage 3	Final / BM	
Athlete	Event	Opposition Result	Opposition Result	Opposition Result	Opposition Result	Opposition Result	Opposition Result	Opposition Result	Opposition Result	Rank
Gil Offer	Men's -73kg	Camilo (BRA); L 0100-1010	—N/a			Yagoubi (ALG); L 0010-0110	Did not advance			
Ariel Ze'evi	Men's -100kg	Nastula (POL); W 1110-0000	Kovács (HUN); W 1011-0000	Inoue (JPN); L 0000-1011	—N/a		Kessel (CUB); W 0120-0010	Sabino (BRA); W 1111-0001	Traineau (FRA); L 0000-1000	5
Orit Bar On	Women's -57kg	Bye	Lomba (BEL); L	Did not advance						

== Rhythmic gymnastics ==
Athlete	Event	Qualification						Final					
Athlete	Event	Rope	Hoop	Ball	Ribbon	Total	Rank	Rope	Hoop	Ball	Ribbon	Total	Rank
Or Tokayev	Individual	9.666	9.683	9.645	9.575	38.569	14	Did not advance					

== Sailing ==
Israel competed in four events in the Sailing venue at the 2000 Olympics. They had two top ten finishes, including 4th place in the women's 470.

Athlete	Event	Race											Net points	Final rank
Athlete	Event	1	2	3	4	5	6	7	8	9	10	M*	Net points	Final rank
Amit Inbar	Men's Mistral	3	13	~~14~~; OCS	13	13	5	~~37~~	4	13	4	11	79	7th
Eldad Ronen; Eli Zukerman	Men's 470	3	12	12	~~30~~; OCS	19	11	10	16	~~23~~	7	9	99	13th
Michal Hein	Women's Mistral	11	8	~~21~~	14	14	~~30~~; DSQ	11	13	18	10	16	115	14th
Anat Fabrikant; Shani Kedmi	Women's 470	7	12	1	~~15~~	3	5	3	~~14~~	9	2	8	50	4th

== Shooting ==
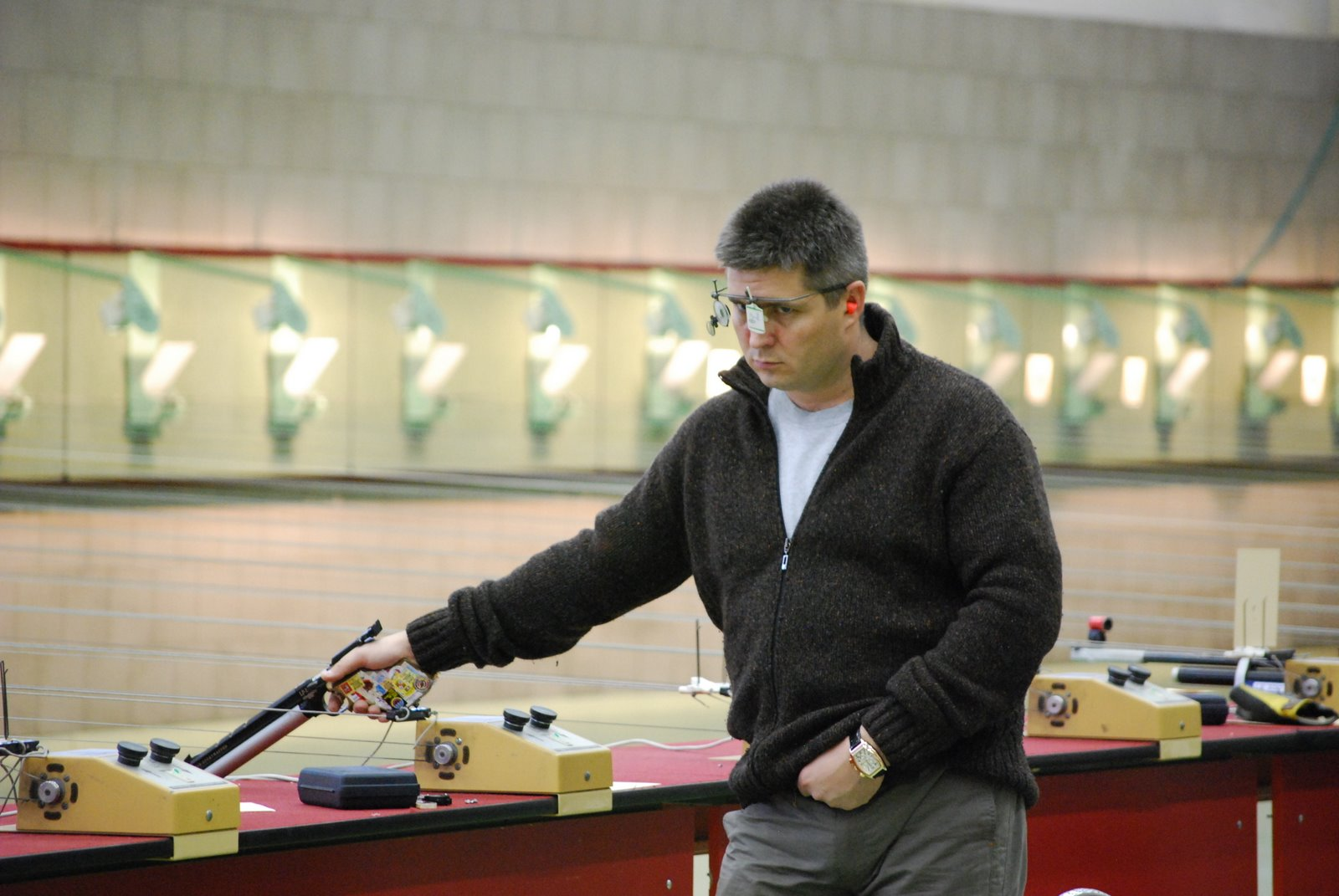
Aleksandr Danilov

Athlete	Event	Qualification		Final	
Athlete	Event	Points	Rank	Total	Rank
Alexander Danilov	10m air pistol	DQ		Did not advance	
Alexander Danilov	50m pistol	556	18	Did not advance	
Guy Starik	50m 3 positions	1154	32	Did not advance	
Guy Starik	50m rifle prone	592	25	Did not advance	

== Swimming ==
=== Men ===
Athlete	Event	Heat		Semifinal		Final	
Athlete	Event	Time	Rank	Time	Rank	Time	Rank
Yoav Bruck	50m freestyle	23.21	34	Did not advance			
Yoav Bruck	100m freestyle	51.62	38	Did not advance			
Eithan Urbach	100m backstroke	55.44 NR	9 Q	55.31 NR	6 Q	55.74	8
Yoav Gath	200m backstroke	2:00.80	13 Q	2:03.80	16	Did not advance	
Tal Stricker	100m breaststroke	1:03.99	32	Did not advance			
Tal Stricker	200m breaststroke	2:19.33	32	Did not advance			
Yoav Meiri	100m butterfly	55.38	37	Did not advance			
Michael Halika	200m butterfly	2:01.97	31	Did not advance			
Michael Halika	200m individual medley	2:07.53	39	Did not advance			
Michael Halika	400m individual medley	4:19.97	11	Did not advance			
Oren Azrad; Yoav Bruck; Alexei Manziula; Eithan Urbach	4 × 100 m freestyle relay	3:22.06 NR	14	Did not advance			
Yoav Bruck; Yoav Meiri; Tal Stricker; Eithan Urbach	4 × 100 m medley relay	3:43.39 NR	17	Did not advance			

=== Women ===
Athlete	Event	Heat		Semifinal		Final	
Athlete	Event	Time	Rank	Time	Rank	Time	Rank
Adi Bichman	400m freestyle	4:27.33	38	Did not advance			
Adi Bichman	800m freestyle	9:01.90	25	Did not advance			
Adi Bichman	400m individual medley	5:06.72	26	Did not advance			
Vered Borochovski	100m butterfly	1:00.34	19	Did not advance			
Vered Borochovski	200m individual medley	2:18.99	21	Did not advance			

== Wrestling ==
Greco-Roman

Athlete	Event	Elimination pool				Quarterfinal	Semifinal	Final / BM	
Athlete	Event	Opposition Result	Opposition Result	Opposition Result	Rank	Opposition Result	Opposition Result	Opposition Result	Rank
Michael Beilin	63 kg	Zhuk (BLR); L 0–1	Kurbanov (UZB); L 0–4	—N/a	3	did not advance			15
Gocha Tsitsiashvili	85 kg	Aanes (NOR); L 2–7	Vitt (UZB); W 3-0	Bach Hamba (TUN); W 11–1	2	did not advance			6
Yuri Evseitchik	130 kg	Bakir (TUR); W 3-0	Vála (CZE); W 5-1	Sitnik (TUN); W 3–1	1 Q	Bye	Gardner (USA); L 2–3	Debelka (BLR); L 0–1	4

== See also ==
- Israel at the 2000 Summer Paralympics

== Notes ==
- Wallechinsky, David (2004). The Complete Book of the Summer Olympics (Athens 2004 Edition). Toronto, Canada. ISBN 1-894963-32-6.
- International Olympic Committee (2001). The Results. Retrieved 12 November 2005.
- Sydney Organising Committee for the Olympic Games (2001). Official Report of the XXVII Olympiad Volume 1: Preparing for the Games. Retrieved 20 November 2005.
- Sydney Organising Committee for the Olympic Games (2001). Official Report of the XXVII Olympiad Volume 2: Celebrating the Games. Retrieved 20 November 2005.
- Sydney Organising Committee for the Olympic Games (2001). The Results. Retrieved 20 November 2005.
- International Olympic Committee Web Site
