= Wrestling at the 1996 Summer Olympics – Men's Greco-Roman 82 kg =

Men's Greco-Roman 82 kg at the Games of the XXVI Olympiad
- Venue: Georgia World Congress Center
- Dates: 20–21 July 1996
- Competitors: 19 from 19 nations

Medalists
1st place, gold medalist(s)		Hamza Yerlikaya	Turkey
2nd place, silver medalist(s)		Thomas Zander	Germany
3rd place, bronze medalist(s)		Valery Tsilent	Belarus

The men's Greco-Roman 82 kilograms at the 1996 Summer Olympics as part of the wrestling program were held at the Georgia World Congress Center from July 20 to July 21. The gold and silver medalists were determined by the final match of the main single-elimination bracket. The losers advanced to the repechage. These matches determined the bronze medalist for the event.

== Results ==
Legend

- DQ — Won by disqualification
- WO — Won by walkover

=== Round 1 ===
	Score		CP
1/16 finals
Daulet Turlykhanov (KAZ)	10–0 Fall	Elias Marcano (VEN)	4–0 TO
Raatbek Sanatbayev (KGZ)	3–0	Aleksandar Jovančević (YUG)	3–0 PO
Valery Tsilent (BLR)	10–0	Jean-Pierre Wafflard (BEL)	4–0 ST
Dan Henderson (USA)	3–1	Pavel Frinta (CZE)	3–1 PP
Martin Lidberg (SWE)	2–0	Levon Geghamyan (ARM)	3–0 PO
Sergey Tsvir (RUS)	3–0	Péter Farkas (HUN)	3–0 PO
Félix Isisola (PER)	0–10	Thomas Zander (GER)	0–4 ST
Tuomo Karila (FIN)	0–2	Gocha Tsitsiashvili (ISR)	0–3 PO
Park Myung-suk (KOR)	5–3	Anton Arghira (ROM)	3–1 PP
Hamza Yerlikaya (TUR)		Bye	

=== Round 2 ===
	Score		CP
1/8 finals
Hamza Yerlikaya (TUR)	7–0	Daulet Turlykhanov (KAZ)	3–0 PO
Raatbek Sanatbayev (KGZ)	1–7	Valery Tsilent (BLR)	1–3 PP
Dan Henderson (USA)	1–3	Martin Lidberg (SWE)	1–3 PP
Sergey Tsvir (RUS)	0–4 DQ	Thomas Zander (GER)	0–4 EV
Gocha Tsitsiashvili (ISR)	4–1	Park Myung-suk (KOR)	3–1 PP
Repechage
Elias Marcano (VEN)	1–11	Aleksandar Jovančević (YUG)	1–4 SP
Jean-Pierre Wafflard (BEL)	0–2	Pavel Frinta (CZE)	0–3 PO
Levon Geghamyan (ARM)	4–0	Péter Farkas (HUN)	3–0 PO
Félix Isisola (PER)	0–11	Tuomo Karila (FIN)	0–4 ST
Anton Arghira (ROM)		Bye	

=== Round 3 ===
	Score		CP
Quarterfinals
Hamza Yerlikaya (TUR)	5–0	Valery Tsilent (BLR)	3–0 PO
Martin Lidberg (SWE)		Bye	
Thomas Zander (GER)		Bye	
Gocha Tsitsiashvili (ISR)		Bye	
Repechage
Anton Arghira (ROM)	0–5	Aleksandar Jovančević (YUG)	0–3 PO
Pavel Frinta (CZE)	2–3	Levon Geghamyan (ARM)	1–3 PP
Tuomo Karila (FIN)	3–7	Daulet Turlykhanov (KAZ)	1–3 PP
Raatbek Sanatbayev (KGZ)	3–2	Dan Henderson (USA)	3–1 PP
Sergey Tsvir (RUS)	11–0	Park Myung-suk (KOR)	4–0 ST

=== Round 4 ===
	Score		CP
Semifinals
Hamza Yerlikaya (TUR)	1–0	Martin Lidberg (SWE)	3–0 PO
Thomas Zander (GER)	3–1	Gocha Tsitsiashvili (ISR)	3–1 PP
Repechage
Aleksandar Jovančević (YUG)	0–2	Levon Geghamyan (ARM)	0–3 PO
Daulet Turlykhanov (KAZ)	4–3	Raatbek Sanatbayev (KGZ)	3–1 PP
Sergey Tsvir (RUS)	0–10 Ret	Valery Tsilent (BLR)	0–4 PA

=== Round 5 ===
	Score		CP
Repechage
Levon Geghamyan (ARM)	1–3	Daulet Turlykhanov (KAZ)	1–3 PP
Valery Tsilent (BLR)		Bye	

=== Round 6 ===
	Score		CP
Repechage
Martin Lidberg (SWE)	1–4	Valery Tsilent (BLR)	1–3 PP
Daulet Turlykhanov (KAZ)	4–0	Gocha Tsitsiashvili (ISR)	3–0 PO

=== Finals ===
	Score		CP
Classification 7th–8th
Levon Geghamyan (ARM)	WO	Raatbek Sanatbayev (KGZ)	4–0 PA
Classification 5th–6th
Martin Lidberg (SWE)	WO	Gocha Tsitsiashvili (ISR)	0–4 PA
Bronze medal match
Valery Tsilent (BLR)	4–0	Daulet Turlykhanov (KAZ)	3–0 PO
Gold medal match
Hamza Yerlikaya (TUR)	3–0	Thomas Zander (GER)	3–0 PO

== Final standing ==
Rank	Athlete
1st place, gold medalist(s)	Hamza Yerlikaya (TUR)
2nd place, silver medalist(s)	Thomas Zander (GER)
3rd place, bronze medalist(s)	Valery Tsilent (BLR)
4	Daulet Turlykhanov (KAZ)
5	Gocha Tsitsiashvili (ISR)
6	Martin Lidberg (SWE)
7	Levon Geghamyan (ARM)
8	Raatbek Sanatbayev (KGZ)
9	Aleksandar Jovančević (YUG)
10	Sergey Tsvir (RUS)
11	Tuomo Karila (FIN)
12	Dan Henderson (USA)
13	Pavel Frinta (CZE)
14	Park Myung-suk (KOR)
15	Anton Arghira (ROM)
16	Elias Marcano (VEN)
17	Jean-Pierre Wafflard (BEL)
17	Péter Farkas (HUN)
17	Félix Isisola (PER)
