= Mohamed Abdelfatah (wrestler) =

Egyptian Greco-Roman wrestler

Mohamed Abdelfattah
Personal information
- Born: 4 February 1978 (age 48) Suez, Egypt
- Height: 1.86 m (6 ft 1 in)
- Weight: 96 kg (212 lb)
- Website: www.facebook.com/Mohamed-Abdelfatah-Bogy-120985619923

Sport
- Sport: Wrestling
- Event: Greco-Roman
- Club: Police Sports Club
- Coached by: Yehia Kazarian. 2006-2012
Medal record
Men's Greco-Roman wrestling
Representing Egypt
Olympic Games
	2000 Sydney	85 kg
	2004 Athens	84 kg
	2012 London	96 kg
World Championships
Gold medal – first place	2006 Guangzhou	84 kg
Bronze medal – third place	2002 Moscow	84 kg
Silver medal – second place	1998 Cairo (junior)	76 kg
World Cup
Gold medal – first place	2002 Cairo	84 kg
Gold medal – first place	2001 France	85 kg
Golden Grand Prix
Bronze medal – third place	2011 Georgia	96 kg
Silver medal – second place	2010 Azerbaijan	96 kg
Silver medal – second place	2006 Romania	96 kg
Gold medal – first place	2004 Hungary	97 kg
Gold medal – first place	2002 Germany	97 kg
Gold medal – first place	2001 Austria	97 kg
Gold medal – first place	2000 Alexandria	84 kg
Bronze medal – third place	2000 Italy	84 kg
Bronze medal – third place	2000 France	85 kg
Jeux Mediterranéens
Bronze medal – third place	2013 Istanbul	120 kg
Gold medal – first place	2010 Istanbul	96 kg
Gold medal – first place	2005 Almeria	85 kg
Gold medal – first place	2001 Tunis	85 kg
African Championships
Gold medal – first place	2010 Cairo	96 kg
Gold medal – first place	2002 Cairo	84 kg
Gold medal – first place	2001 Morocco	84 kg
Gold medal – first place	2000 Cairo	84 kg
Gold medal – first place	1998 Cairo	76 kg
All African Games
Gold medal – first place	1999 Johannesburg	84 kg Greco-Roman
Gold medal – first place	1999 Johannesburg	84 kg Freestyle wrestling
Pan Arabian Games
Gold medal – first place	2001 Syria	84 kg
Gold medal – first place	1999 Jordan	84 kg
Gold medal – first place	1997 Damascus	83 kg

Mohamed Abdelfatah (Arabic: محمد عبد الفتاح, born February 4, 1978 in Suez, Egypt), commonly known by his nickname "Bogy" (Arabic: بوجى), is a retired Egyptian Greco-Roman wrestler and coach. He competed in the 76 kg, 84 kg, and 96 kg weight classes.

Abdelfatah won the gold medal at the 2006 World Wrestling Championships in Guangzhou, China, in the 84 kg division. He also won a bronze medal at the 2002 World Wrestling Championships in Moscow, Russia, and a silver medal at the 1998 World Junior Wrestling Championships in Cairo, Egypt. Along with Mostafa Hamid, who won a world title in 1954, Abdelfatah is one of only two Egyptian wrestlers to have won a senior world championship.

He represented Egypt at three Olympic Games: Sydney 2000, Athens 2004, and London 2012. In 2007, he suffered an anterior cruciate ligament (ACL) injury, which prevented him from qualifying for the 2008 Beijing Olympic Games.

After retiring from competition, Abdelfatah began a coaching career. In 2009, he became coach of the Swedish national Greco-Roman wrestling team. In his first season, he guided Jimmy Lidbergto to a silver medal and Jalmar Sjöberg to a bronze medal at the 2009 World Championship in Denmark.

In 2010, he served as a technical coach for the United States Greco-Roman team. From 2013 to 2017, he worked as an assistant coach at the United States Olympic Training Center in Colorado Springs, Colorado, under Olympic champion coach Momir Petkovic.

In 2015, Abdelfatah contributed to the development of wrestling in Bahrain and won a bronze medal at the Asian Wrestling Championship in Thailand.

From 2017 to 2022, he served as head coach at the Olympic Training Center in Colorado Springs and as a national coach for USA Wrestling. In 2023, he started his collegiate coaching career as an assistant coach at the University of North Carolina, (UNC). During the 2023 NCAA season, Austin O'Connor won his second NCAA national title, and two wrestlers earned All-American honors.

Abdelfatah also serves as a coach educator for United World Wrestling, contributing to the development of international coaching programs.

== Early life ==
Abdelfatah was born in Suez, Egypt, the eldest of four sons. His Father was a football coach who emphasized athletic discipline and training. Abdelfatah began wrestling at the age of Six at El Samad Club in Suez. A family friend who coached at the club noticed him watching and imitating wrestling moves and invited him to join practice sessions. He subsequently began training at the club alongside several friends from his neighborhood.

In 1995, he was identified by Yehia Kazarian, then head coach of the Egyptian national Graeco-Roman wrestling team. Kazarian recruited Abdelfatah to the national team that same year.

At the 2011 World Wrestling Championships, competing in the 96 kg category, Abdelfattah finished fifth. His placement secured qualification for the 2012 Olympic games, making him the only African wrestler in his weight class to earn qualification at that event.

== 2000 Olympics ==
Wrestler	W	L	CP	TP
Luis Enrique Méndez (CUB)	2	0	6	9
Mohamed Abdelfatah (EGY)	1	1	5	15
Quincey Clark (USA)	0	2	0	0

Red	Blue	CP	TP
Quincey Clark	Luis Enrique Méndez	0-3 PO	0-5
Mohamed Abdelfatah	Quincey Clark	4-0 ST	12-0
Luis Enrique Méndez	Mohamed Abdelfatah	3-1 PP	4-3

== 2004 Olympics ==
=== Pool 2 ===
Wrestler	W	L	CP	TP
Mohamed Abdelfatah (EGY)	2	0	6	7
Brad Vering (USA)	1	1	4	0
Mukhran Vakhtangadze (GEO)	0	2	0	0

Red	Blue	CP	TP
Mohamed Abdelfatah	Mukhran Vakhtangadze	3-0 PO	3-0
Brad Vering	Mohamed Abdelfatah	0-3 PO	0-4
Mukhran Vakhtangadze	Brad Vering	0-4 PA	

5th place match
Mohamed Abdelfatah (EGY)	EV
Dimitrios Avramis (GRE)

== Major international achievements ==
- Asian Olympic Qualification Tournament-4th -2015 for Bahrain.
- Asian Championships - Thailand - Bronze -2015 for Bahrain.
- Grand Prix - Hungary- 5th -2015 for Bahrain.
- Mediterranean Games- Istanbul - Turkey -Bronze -2013.
- Summer Olympics - London -United Kingdom- 13th - 2012.
- Outstanding Memorial Tournament - Ukraine- Bronze -2012.
- David Schultz USA-Colorado Springs -Gold- 2012.
- World Championship - Istanbul -Turkey - 5th - 2011.
- David Schultz Tournament -Colorado Springs - USA - Gold - 2011.
- Golden Grand Prix -Tbilisi - Bronze - 2011.
- Golden Grand Prix Final - Baku - Silver - 2010.
- African Championships - Cairo, Egypt - Gold - 2010.
- Mediterranean Games - Istanbul, Turkey - Gold - 2010.
- Olympic Qualification Tournament - Italy- 4th - 2008.
- Olympic Qualification Tournament - Serbia- 6th - 2008.
- World Championship -Guangzhou - China Gold - 2006.
- Ion Cornianu & Ladislau Simon Tournament- Romania- Bronze-2006.
- Poland Open Ziolkowski-Poland - 4th- 2006.
- Nikola Petrov - Bulgaria- Bronze - 2006.
- David Schultz Tournament- Colorado Springs - USA-Gold -2006.
- World Championship - Hungary - 8th.
- Mediterranean Games -Almeria - Spain- Gold - 2005.
- Nikola Petrov - Bulgaria- 5 th - 2005.
- David Schultz Tournament USA - Colorado Springs- Gold - 2005.
- Arab Games - Algeria - Gold - 2004.
- Olympic Games - Athens- Greece- Quarter Final-5th - 2004
- Grand Prix Hungary - Gold - 2004.
- World Championship - France -9th -2003.
- Poland Open Ziolkowski-Poland - 4th - 2003.
- World Cup -Cairo - Egypt -Gold - 2002.
- World Championship - Moscow - Bronze - 2002.
- Grand Peix Dortmund - Germany - Gold - 2002.
- Ibrahim Mostafa -Alexandria - Egypt - Gold - 2002.
- Africa Championship - Cairo - Egypt -Gold - 2002.
- World Cup -Paris- France - Gold - 2001.
- Ibrahim Mostafa - Alexandria - Egypt- Gold - 2001.
- Mediterranea Games - Tunisia - Gold - 2001.
- Ivan Poddubny - Russia - 4th - 2001.
- Africa Championship - Morocco - Gold - 2001.
- Arab Championship - Syria - Gold - 2001.
- Grand Prix -Spain -Gold 2001.
- Austria Open - Austria -Gold - 2001.
- Olympic Games - Sydney - 8th - 2000.
- Ivan Poddubny - Russia - 5th.
- African Championship - Tunisia - Gold - 2000.
- Olympic Qualification Tournament -Egypt - Gold - 2000.
- Olympic Qualification Tournament - Italy - Bronze - 2000.
- Olympic Qualification Tournament - France - Bronze - 2000.
- African Games Johannesburg - South Africa (Freestyle) - Gold - 1999.
- African Games Johannesburg - South Africa - Gold - 1999.
- Arab Games in Jordan - Gold - 1999.
- King's Championship - Jordan - Gold - 1999.
- Junior World Championship - Cairo - Silver - 1998.
- Ion Cornianu & Ladislau Simon Tournament- Romania-4th -1998.
- Vebbi Emre Tournament - Ankara-Turkey - 4 th 1998.
- Africa Championship - Cairo -Egypt- Gold - 1998.
- Arab Junior Cup -Damascus- Syria - Gold - 1997.
- Arab Junior Cup - Cairo - Egypt- Gold - 1996.

== External links and references ==
- Evans, Hilary; Gjerde, Arild; Heijmans, Jeroen; Mallon, Bill; et al. "Mohamed Abdelfatah". Olympics at Sports-Reference.com. Sports Reference LLC. Archived from the original on 18 April 2020.
- Profile at FILA Wrestling Database
