= Aanes =

Aanes is a Norwegian surname. Notable people with the surname include:

- Fritz Aanes (born 1978), Norwegian Greco-Roman wrestler
- Lene Aanes (born 1976), Norwegian sport wrestler
