= Jovančević =

Jovančević or Jovancevic is a common Serbian and a Croatian surname. The last name can be translated as Johnny's son leading to the English equivalent last name of Johnnyson

== Geographical distribution ==
As of 2016, the frequency of the surname Jovančević was highest in Serbia (1: 2,733), followed by Croatia (1: 4,862).

== People ==
Notable people with the surname include:

- Aleksandar Jovančević
