= 2013 European Wrestling Championships – Men's Greco-Roman 96 kg =

The men's Greco-Roman 96 kg is a competition featured at the 2013 European Wrestling Championships, and was held at the Tbilisi Sports Palace in Tbilisi, Georgia on 23 March 2013.

== Medalists ==
Gold	Artur Aleksanyan; Armenia
Silver	Vladislav Metodiev; Bulgaria
Bronze	Mélonin Noumonvi; France
Bronze	Cenk İldem; Turkey

== Results ==
Legend

- C — Won by 3 cautions given to the opponent
- F — Won by fall

=== Final ===
Final
Vladislav Metodiev (BUL)	0	0
Artur Aleksanyan (ARM)	3	3

=== Top half ===
Round of 32

Round of 16
Vladislav Metodiev (BUL)	1	0	2
Dejan Franjković (SRB)	0	4	0
Robert Avanesyan (ISR)	0	0
Mélonin Noumonvi (FRA)	1	1
Daniel Gastl (AUT)	1	4
Laokratis Kessidis (GRE)	6	4
Felix Radinger (GER)	2	1
Timo Kallio (FIN)	0	0

Quarterfinals
Vladislav Metodiev (BUL)	2	0	1
Mélonin Noumonvi (FRA)	0	2	0
Laokratis Kessidis (GRE)	0	0
Felix Radinger (GER)	1	1

Semifinals
Vladislav Metodiev (BUL)	2	1	1
Felix Radinger (GER)	0	1	1

=== Bottom half ===
Round of 32
Aliaksandr Hrabovik (BLR)	0	1	0
Daigoro Timoncini (ITA)	1	0	1
Marius Hamlet Nielsen (NOR)	0	1
Shalva Gadabadze (AZE)	1	3
Volodymyr Vasyliev (UKR)	3	0
Soso Jabidze (GEO)	6	2
Fredrik Schön (SWE)	0	0
Artur Aleksanyan (ARM)	1	1
Nikita Melnikov (RUS)	1	1
Balázs Kiss (HUN)	1	0
Vilius Laurinaitis (LTU)	2	2
Cenk İldem (TUR)	0	4^{C}

Round of 16
Alin Alexuc-Ciurariu (ROU)	0	1	2
Marcin Olejniczak (POL)	3	0	0
Daigoro Timoncini (ITA)	0	0
Shalva Gadabadze (AZE)	1	5
Soso Jabidze (GEO)	0	1	0
Artur Aleksanyan (ARM)	5	1	6
Nikita Melnikov (RUS)	3	0	0
Cenk İldem (TUR)	0	1	1

Quarterfinals
Alin Alexuc-Ciurariu (ROU)	0	0
Shalva Gadabadze (AZE)	1	3
Artur Aleksanyan (ARM)	2	2
Cenk İldem (TUR)	0	0

Semifinals
Shalva Gadabadze (AZE)	0	0
Artur Aleksanyan (ARM)	1	3

=== Repechage ===
Repechage round 1
Fredrik Schön (SWE)	1	0
Soso Jabidze (GEO)	1	2

Repechage round 2
Dejan Franjković (SRB)	0	0
Mélonin Noumonvi (FRA)	1	3
Soso Jabidze (GEO)	0	0
Cenk İldem (TUR)	1	2

Bronze medals
Mélonin Noumonvi (FRA)	3	3
Felix Radinger (GER)	0	0
Cenk İldem (TUR)	0	1	1
Shalva Gadabadze (AZE)	1	0	0
