= Wrestling at the 1999 Pan American Games =

Wrestling at the 1999 Pan American Games took place in Winnipeg, Canada, featuring freestyle and Greco-Roman styles. The United States dominated freestyle wrestling winning 8 golds, while Cuba secured 7 golds and many medals in Greco-Roman wrestling. Canada, as the host nation, earned 8 medals in total. Notable wrestlers included Lincoln McIlravy from the USA in freestyle and Lázaro Rivas from Cuba in Greco-Roman.

== Men's events ==
=== Freestyle ===
Event	Gold	Silver	Bronze
54 kg	Wilfredo García; Cuba	Paul Ragusa; Canada	Eric Akin; United States
58 kg	Guivi Sissaouri; Canada	Eric Guerrero; United States	Yoendri Albear Ferrer; Cuba
63 kg	Cary Kolat; United States	Carlos Julian Ortíz; Cuba	Marty Calder; Canada
69 kg	Lincoln McIlravy; United States	Yosmany Sánchez; Cuba	Daniel Igali; Canada
76 kg	Joe Williams; United States	Romero Rodríguez; Cuba	Manuel Garcia; Puerto Rico
85 kg	Les Gutches; United States	Gary Holmes; Canada	Yoel Romero Palacio; Cuba
97 kg	Dominic Black; United States	Wilfredo Morales Suárez; Cuba	Dean Schmeichel; Canada
130 kg	Stephen Neal; United States	Alexis Rodríguez; Cuba	Wayne Weathers; Canada

=== Greco-Roman ===
Event	Gold	Silver	Bronze
54 kg	Lázaro Rivas; Cuba	David Ochoa; Venezuela	Steven Mays; United States
58 kg	Dennis Hall; United States	Roberto Monzón; Cuba	Sidney Guzman; Peru
63 kg	Juan Marén; Cuba	Enrique Cubs; Peru	Glenn Nieradka; United States
69 kg	Liubal Colás Oris; Cuba	David Zuniga; United States	Luis Izquierdo; Colombia
76 kg	Matt Lindland; United States	Filiberto Azcuy; Cuba	Rodolfo Hernández; Mexico
85 kg	Luis Enrique Méndez; Cuba	Quincey Clark; United States	Eddy Enrique Bartolozzi; Venezuela
97 kg	Reynaldo Peña; Cuba	Jason Klohs; United States	Colbie Bell; Canada
130 kg	Héctor Milian; Cuba	Dremiel Byers; United States	Rafael Barreno; Venezuela

== Medal table ==
* Host nation (Canada)

Rank	Nation	Gold	Silver	Bronze	Total
1	United States	8	5	3	16
2	Cuba	7	7	2	16
3	Canada	1	2	5	8
4	Venezuela	0	1	2	3
5	Peru	0	1	1	2
6	Colombia	0	0	1	1
6	Mexico	0	0	1	1
6	Puerto Rico	0	0	1	1
Totals (8 entries)		16	16	16	48
