= Tal Stricker =

Israeli swimmer

- טל שטריקר
- Born: May 29, 1979 (age 47); Ramat Gan, Tel Aviv
- Education: Florida State University
- Occupation: Olympic swimmer

Tal Stricker (Hebrew: טל שטריקר; born May 29, 1979) is a breaststroke swimmer from Israel, who competed for Israel at the 2000 Summer Olympics in Sydney, Australia.

== Early life ==
Stricker was born in Ramat Gan, Israel, and his parents are Rafi and Nava Stricker. He attended Tichon Hadash High School in Tel Aviv.

== Swimming career ==
Competing for Israel at the 2000 Summer Olympics in Sydney, Australia, Stricker swam in three events. He won his preliminary heat in the 100m breaststroke (1:03.99), but did not advance to the semifinals and placed 32nd. He also finished 32nd in the 200m breaststroke (2:19.33). He was a member of Israel's 4 × 100 m Medley Relay Team that finished in 5th place in the preliminary heat (3:43.39), and did not advance; they ended up 17th overall.

Stricker was a member of Israel's 4 × 100 m Medley Relay Team that finished in 8th place (3:43.48) at the European LC Championships 2000 in Helsinki, Finland.

In 2000–01, he was a freshman at Florida State University. He finished 9th in the 100m breaststroke in the 2001 Atlantic Coast Conference (ACC) Championship. As a sophomore, he broke the school record in the 200m breaststroke with a time of 1:59.68.

At the 2017 Maccabiah Games, in the special 4x50m relay race between Israeli and American all-star teams, American Olympic champions Lenny Krayzelburg (four Olympic golds), Jason Lezak (four Olympic golds), and Anthony Ervin (three Olympic golds), with masters swimmer Alex Blavatnik, swam a time of 1:48.23 and defeated Israeli Olympians Stricker, Guy Barnea, Yoav Bruck, and Eran Groumi, who had a time of 1:51.25.
