= Justin Ruiz =

American wrestler (born 1979)

Personal information
- Born: February 16, 1979 (age 47) Salt Lake City, Utah, U.S.

Sport
- Country: United States
- Sport: Wrestling
- Event: Greco-Roman
- College team: Nebraska
- Club: New York Athletic Club
- Team: USA
Medal record
Men's Greco-Roman wrestling
Representing the United States
World Championships
Bronze medal – third place	2005 Budapest	96 kg
World Cup
Silver medal – second place	2003 Almaty	96 kg
Pan American Games
Gold medal – first place	2007 Rio de Janeiro	96 kg
Silver medal – second place	2003 Santo Domingo	96 kg
Pan American Championships
Gold medal – first place	2007 San Salvador	96 kg
Gold medal – first place	2008 Colorado Springs	96 kg
Gold medal – first place	2010 Monterrey	96 kg
Gold medal – first place	2011 Rionegro	96 kg
Bronze medal – third place	2012 Colorado Springs	96 kg

Justin Ruiz (born February 16, 1979) is an American former Greco-Roman wrestler. He represented the United States in Greco-Roman wrestling six-times at the World Wrestling Championships. At the 2005 World Championships, he earned a bronze medal at 96 kg. He was a member of the 2007 United States Greco-Roman World Champion Team. Ruiz was also a two-time Pan American Games medalist, winning gold at 96 kg in 2007.

== Wrestling career ==
Ruiz wrestled at Taylorsville High School in Taylorsville, Utah, where he was a three-time Utah state champion. He then attended the University of Nebraska, where he was a two-time NCAA wrestling All-American.

Following college, he made the transition to competing in Greco-Roman wrestling full-time. Ruiz won a bronze medal at 96 kg at the 2005 World Championships. Along with that, he was a six-time USA World Team member, ten-time USA National Team member, two-time Olympic alternate, two-time USA Greco-Roman Wrestler of the Year, four-time Pan American Champion, a World Cup Silver Medalist, and a member of the 2007 USA Greco-Roman World Championship Team.

Following his competitive career, Ruiz has continued to help support USA Wrestling, being named Director of Donor & Alumni Relations for USA Wrestling in 2022.
