= Arek Olczak =

Australian wrestler

Personal information
- Nationality: Australian
- Born: 2 August 1963 (age 62) Warsaw, Poland

Sport
- Sport: Wrestling

Arek Olczak (born 2 August 1963) is an Australian wrestler. He competed in the men's Greco-Roman 85 kg at the 2000 Summer Olympics.
