= Park Myung-suk =

South Korean wrestler (born 1970)

Park Myung-Suk (also Park Myeong-Seok; 박명석; born January 9, 1970) is a South Korean former Olympic wrestler.

== Wrestling career ==
His sports club is Ma San City Hall.

Park won the gold medals at the 1989 Asian Wrestling Championships: 74.0 kg Greco-Roman, the 1992 and 1993 Asian Championships: 82.0 kg Greco-Roman, and the 1997 and 1998 Asian Championships: 85.0 kg Greco-Roman.

He competed for South Korea at the 1992 Summer Olympics in Barcelona, at the age of 22, in Wrestling--Men's Middleweight (82 kg), Greco-Roman. He lost to Thomas Zander of Germany in the first round, beat Jean-Pierre Wafflard of Belgium in the second round, and was defeated by Magnus Fredriksson of Sweden in the third round.

Park also competed for South Korea at the 1996 Summer Olympics in Atlanta at the age of 26 in Wrestling--Men's Middleweight (82 kg), Greco-Roman, and came in 14th.
