= Soso Jabidze =

Georgian Greco-Roman wrestler

Personal information
- Full name: Soso Jabidze
- Nationality: Georgia
- Born: 14 August 1987 (age 39) Mayakovsky, Georgian SSR, Soviet Union
- Height: 1.83 m (6 ft 0 in)
- Weight: 96 kg (212 lb)

Sport
- Style: Greco-Roman
- Coach: Merab Tartshia
Medal record
Men's Greco-Roman wrestling
Representing Georgia
European Championships
Bronze medal – third place	2010 Baku	96 kg

Soso Jabidze (Georgian: სოსო ჯაბიძე; born 14 August 1987 in Mayakovsky) is an amateur Georgian Greco-Roman wrestler, who competes in the men's heavyweight category. He won a bronze medal in his division at the 2010 European Wrestling Championships in Baku, Azerbaijan.

Jabidze represented Georgia at the 2012 Summer Olympics in London, where he competed in the men's 96 kg class. He received a bye for the preliminary round of sixteen match, before losing out to Albanian-born Bulgarian wrestler and world champion Elis Guri, with a three-set technical score (0–2, 1–0, 0–1), and a classification point score of 1–3.
