= Tarvi Thomberg =

Estonian Greco-Roman wrestler

Personal information
- Full name: Tarvi Thomberg
- Nationality: Estonia
- Born: 10 May 1982 (age 44) Vana-Vigala, Rapla County, Estonia
- Height: 1.81 m (5 ft 11 1/2 in)
- Weight: 88 kg (194 lb)

Sport
- Style: Greco-Roman
- Club: MK Juhan Märjamaa
- Coach: Henn Põlluste

Tarvi Thomberg (born 10 May 1982) is a retired amateur Estonian Greco-Roman wrestler, who competed in the men's light heavyweight category. Thomberg represented his nation Estonia at the 2004 Summer Olympics, and has also held three Estonian and Nordic championship titles in the light heavyweight division. Before retiring from the sport in 2008, Thomberg trained as a member of the wrestling team for MK Juhan Märjamaa under his personal coach Henn Põlluste.

Thomberg was born in Vana-Vigala, and qualified for the men's 84 kg class at the 2004 Summer Olympics in Athens, Greece by receiving a berth from the 2003 World Wrestling Championships in Créteil, France. Delivering a mediocre, yet a disappointing performance in the preliminary pool, Thomberg lost all of his matches against Ukraine's Oleksandr Daragan, Bulgaria's Vladislav Metodiev, and Turkey's Hamza Yerlikaya, who was seeking to defend his Olympic title from Sydney four years earlier, without receiving a single point.
