= Salvatore Campanella =

Italian wrestler

Personal information
- Nationality: Italian
- Born: 28 October 1969 (age 56) Catania, Italy

Sport
- Sport: Wrestling

Salvatore Campanella (born 28 October 1969) is an Italian wrestler. He competed in the men's Greco-Roman 90 kg at the 1992 Summer Olympics.
