= Behrouz Jamshidi =

Iranian wrestler (born 1972)

Personal information
- Full name: Behrouz Jamshidi
- Nationality: Iranian
- Born: 23 August 1972 (age 53) Izeh, Iran
- Height: 1.78 m (5 ft 10 in)
- Weight: 84 kg (185 lb)

Sport
- Country: Iran
- Style: Greco-Roman
- Club: Wrestling Club Takhti
- Coach: Kahide, Babak Vali Mohammadi
Medal record
Asian Championships
Bronze medal – third place	1995 Manil	82 kg
Bronze medal – third place	1997 Tehran	85 kg

Behrouz Jamshidi (Persian: بهروز جمشيدی; born August 23, 1972, in (Chaharmahal and Bakhtiari Province) is a retired amateur Iranian Greco-Roman wrestler, who competed in the men's light heavyweight category. On January 3, 2000, the International Federation of Associated Wrestling (FILA) ordered him a two-year suspension from competition for testing positive for doping.

== Biography ==
He finished fourth in the 85-kg division at the 1998 Asian Games in Bangkok, and later represented his nation Iran, as a 31-year-old, at the 2004 Summer Olympics. Jamshidi also trained for Wrestling Club Takhti in Izhe suburb, under his personal coach Vali Mohammadi Babak.

Jamshidi participated at the 1999 World Wrestling Championships in Athens, Greece, where he took home the bronze medal in the 85-kg division.

On January 3, 2000, the International Federation of Associated Wrestling (FILA) stripped Jamshidi of his medal, and ordered him a two-year suspension, for testing positive on doping; as a result he could not compete at the Summer Olympics in Sydney. When his suspension expired in September 2001, Jamshidi returned to wrestling and competed in several international tournaments, including the World and Asian Championships, but achieved mediocre results and left empty-handed.

At the 2004 Summer Olympics in Athens, Jamshidi qualified for the Iranian squad on his official Olympic status in the men's 84 kg class. Earlier in the process, he finished first and received a berth from the Olympic Qualification Tournament in Novi Sad, Serbia and Montenegro. Jamshidi lost his opening match to Greece's Dimitrios Avramis with a 1–3 decision much to the massive cheer from the home crowd inside Ano Liossa Olympic Hall, but eventually edged Norway's Fritz Aanes in a three-point overtime decision in the second round. Finishing the pool in second place and ninth overall, Jamshidi's performance was not enough to put him further into the quarterfinals.
