= Valery Tsilent =

Belarusian wrestler (born 1969)

Medal record

Men's Greco-Roman wrestling

Representing Belarus

Olympic Games
Bronze medal – third place	1996 Atlanta	82 kg

Valeriy Tsilent (born September 29, 1969) is a Belarusian wrestler. At the 1996 Summer Olympics he won a bronze medal in the men's Greco-Roman Middleweight (74–82 kg) category.
