= Raatbek Sanatbayev =

Kyrgyzstani wrestler and politician

- Born: 7 May 1969
- Died: 8 January 2006 (aged 36)

Raatbek Sanatbayev (7 May 1969 – 8 January 2006 in Bishkek, Kyrgyzstan) was a Kyrgyz Greco-Roman wrestler who competed in the Men's Greco-Roman 82 kg at the 1996 Summer Olympics and the Men's Greco-Roman 85 kg at the 2000 Summer Olympics. He won the bronze medal at the 1999 World Championships, and won the Asian Championship in 1999 and 2000, silver medals in the 1995 and 1997 Asian Championships and 1994 and 1998 Asian Games, and a bronze medal at the 1996 Asian Championships.

After retiring from the sport, he ran to become the head of the Kyrgyz Olympic Committee, recently vacated after the murder of Bayaman Erkinbayev the previous September. He was assassinated in 2006.

== Death ==
On 8 January 2006, while Sanatbayev was getting out of a car near a shopping center, two men attacked him, with one shooting him in the head. He died in hospital.

=== Criminal investigation ===
Aldoyar Ismankulov, the National Security Service chief for organized crime, was arrested for the murder within a few weeks, then released and eventually acquitted. Two other suspects were arrested on 2 February. But finally, on 16 April, it was announced that Kuban Jodoshev, who was allegedly responsible for seven murders including Sanatbayev's, was killed during a special police operation in Bishkek.

Sanatbayev had been outspoken in his criticism of fellow-candidate, Ryspek Akmatbaev, a former boxer, businessman, and head of the Kyrgyzstan Fencing Federation, who was at the time on trial for murder, but was later acquitted. Akmatbaev went on to run for parliament in April - he won the election but was not seated because of his alleged criminal ties - when, on 14 May, he was also murdered.
