= Eddy Bartolozzi =

Venezuelan Greco-Roman and freestyle wrestler (born 1977)

Personal information
- Full name: Eddy Enrique Bartolozzi
- Born: 9 July 1977 (age 49) Ciudad Bolívar, Venezuela
- Height: 177 cm (5 ft 10 in)

Sport
- Sport: Greco-Roman wrestling Freestyle wrestling
- Weight class: 84–96 kg (185–212 lb)
Medal record
Representing Venezuela
Pan American Games
Silver medal – second place	2007 Rio de Janeiro	-84kg Greco-Roman
Bronze medal – third place	1999 Winnipeg	-85kg Greco-Roman
Bronze medal – third place	2003 Santo Domingo	-84kg Greco-Roman
Central American and Caribbean Games
Gold medal – first place	2002 San Salvador	-96kg freestyle
Gold medal – first place	2002 San Salvador	-96kg Greco-Roman
Silver medal – second place	2006 Cartagena	-84kg Greco-Roman
Silver medal – second place	2010 Mayaguez	-84kg Greco-Roman
Bronze medal – third place	1998 Maracaibo	-85kg Greco-Roman
Bolivarian Games
Gold medal – first place	1997 Arequipa	-85kg Greco-Roman
Gold medal – first place	2001 Ambato	-97kg Greco-Roman
South American Games
Gold medal – first place	2002 Belém	-96kg Greco-Roman
Gold medal – first place	2002 Belém	-96kg freestyle
Gold medal – first place	2010 Medellín	-84kg Greco-Roman
Silver medal – second place	2006 Buenos Aires	-84kg Greco-Roman
Pan American Championships
Silver medal – second place	2002 Maracaibo	-96kg Greco-Roman
Bronze medal – third place	2000 Cali	-85kg Greco-Roman
Bronze medal – third place	2006 Rio de Janeiro	-84kg Greco-Roman
Bronze medal – third place	2009 Maracaibo	-84kg Greco-Roman

Eddy Enrique Bartolozzi (born 9 July 1977) is a Venezuelan wrestler. He competed in the men's Greco-Roman 85 kg at the 2000 Summer Olympics.
