= Shingo Matsumoto =

Japanese Greco-Roman wrestler

Personal information
- Nationality: Japan
- Born: 3 March 1978 (age 48) Uwajima, Ehime, Japan
- Height: 175 cm (5 ft 9 in)
- Weight: 84 kg (185 lb)

Sport
- Sport: Wrestling
- Event: Greco-Roman
- Club: Ichimiya Transport Sports Club
- Coached by: Hideo Fujimoto
Medal record
Men's Greco-Roman wrestling
Representing Japan
Asian Games
Gold medal – first place	2002 Busan	84 kg
Bronze medal – third place	2006 Doha	84 kg
Asian Championships
Gold medal – first place	2008 Jeju City	84 kg
Silver medal – second place	2001 Ulaanbaatar	84 kg

Shingo Matsumoto (松本 慎吾, Matsumoto Shingo; born March 3, 1978 in Uwajima, Ehime) is an amateur Japanese Greco-Roman wrestler, who played for the men's light heavyweight category. He won a gold and a bronze medal for his division at the 2002 Asian Games in Busan, South Korea, and at the 2006 Asian Games in Doha, Qatar.

Matsumoto made his official debut for the 2004 Summer Olympics in Athens, where he placed second in the preliminary pool of the men's 84 kg class, against Sweden's Ara Abrahamian, Slovakia's Attila Bátky, and Kyrgyzstan's Janarbek Kenjeev.

At the 2008 Summer Olympics in Beijing, Matsumoto competed for the second time in the men's 84 kg class, by receiving a qualifying place from the Asian Wrestling Championships in Jeju City, South Korea. He lost the qualifying round match to Armenia's Denis Forov, with a two-set technical score (2–4, 0–6), and a classification point score of 1–3.
