= Marko Asell =

Finnish wrestler and politician

Personal information
- Nationality: Finnish
- Born: 8 May 1970 (age 56) Ylöjärvi, Pirkanmaa, Finland

Sport
- Sport: Wrestling
Medal record
Men's Greco-Roman wrestling
Representing Finland
Olympic Games
Silver medal – second place	1996 Atlanta	74 kg

Marko Asell (born 8 May 1970 in Ylöjärvi) is a Finnish wrestler and Olympic medalist in Greco-Roman wrestling. He is also a politician, serving as a member of Finnish Parliament first for the 2007–2011 term, and again for the 2019–2023 and 2023–2027 terms.

== Olympics ==
Asell competed at the 1996 Summer Olympics in Atlanta where he won a silver medal in Greco-Roman wrestling, the welterweight class. He also competed at the 2000 Summer Olympics.
