= Gocha Tsitsiashvili =

Israeli Greco-Roman wrestler (born 1973)

Personal information
- Native name: גוצ'ה ציציאשווילי
- Full name: Gocha Tsitsiashvili
- Nationality: Israel
- Born: 7 November 1973 (age 52) Tbilisi, Georgian SSR; Soviet Union
- Height: 1.80 m (5 ft 11 in)
- Weight: 84 kg (185 lb)

Sport
- Sport: Greco-Roman wrestling
- Club: Hapoel Be'er Sheva
- Coached by: Otari Tatishvili (1985–1994); Yakov Masin (1994–2004)

Achievements and titles
- Olympic finals: 5th (1996)
- World finals: (gold) (2003)
- Regional finals: (silver) (1994)
Medal record
Men's Greco-Roman wrestling
Representing Israel
World Championships
Gold medal – first place	2003 Créteil	84 kg
Silver medal – second place	1995 Atlanta	82 kg
European Championships
Silver medal – second place	1994 Athens	82 kg
Bronze medal – third place	1995 Besancon	82 kg
Bronze medal – third place	1996 Budapest	82 kg

Gocha Tsitsiashvili (Hebrew: גוצ'ה ציציאשווילי, Georgian: გოჩა ციციაშვილი; born November 7, 1973, in Tbilisi, Georgian SSR) is a retired amateur Israeli Greco-Roman wrestler, who competed in the men's light heavyweight category. Considering one of the world's top Greco-Roman wrestlers in his decade, Tsitsiashvili had claimed numerous medals in the international scene, including his prestigious gold from the 2003 World Wrestling Championships, and later represented as part of the Israeli team in three editions of the Olympic Games (1996, 2000, and 2004). Tsitsiashvili also became a member of the Hapoel Be'er Sheva Club under his personal coach Yakov Masin.

Tsitsiashvili started his wrestling career as a member of the former Soviet team. When he emigrated to Israel in 1994, Tsitsiashvili sought his sights to compete in the international arena and eventually take home the silver medal at the European Wrestling Championships in Athens, Greece. The following year, Tsitsiashvili continued to flourish his sporting career by finishing third in the same tournament, and eventually picked up a silver in the 82-kg division at the 1995 World Wrestling Championships in Atlanta, Georgia, United States, making him the first Israeli in history to claim a sporting medal.

As Israel's only wrestler to the team, Tsitsiashvili made his official debut at the 1996 Summer Olympics in Atlanta, where he competed in the men's middleweight class (82 kg). Being successful early in the opening rounds, he entered the semifinals powerful and undefeated, but fell to Germany's Thomas Zander, and then shortened his chance to compete for the bronze when he was outclassed by Kazakhstan's Daulet Turlykhanov in his next match. With Sweden's Martin Lidberg being frail and injured, Tsitsiashvili managed to finish in fifth at the end of the tournament.

Determined to return to the Olympic scene and medal, Tsitsiashvili entered the 2000 Summer Olympics in Sydney as a top medal contender in the men's light heavyweight division (85 kg). He lost his opening match to Norway's Fritz Aanes, but managed to score a set of two triumphs to surmount Uzbekistan's Yuriy Vitt and Tunisia's Amor Bach Hamba in the prelim pool. Finishing second in the elimination round and sixth overall, Tsitsiashvili's performance was not enough to advance him further into the semifinals as he left the Games in anguish.

At the 2004 Summer Olympics in Athens, Tsitsiashvili qualified for his third team, as a 31-year-old veteran, in the men's 84 kg class with a brilliant historic success. Earlier in the process, he defeated Sweden's Ara Abrahamian to take home the light heavyweight trophy and a gold medal at the 2003 World Wrestling Championships in Créteil, France, which earned him a spot on the Israeli Olympic team. In the prelim pool, Tsitsiashvili eclipsed France's Mélonin Noumonvi with a powerful score of 3–1, but could not pin Russian wrestler and European champion Alexei Mishin into the ring, as he was outmatched by his fresh opponent without collecting a single point. Tsitsiashvili failed to advance further into the quarterfinals after finishing the pool in second place and fourteenth overall. Realizing about his age and future game plan, Tsitsiashvili announced his retirement from the sport shortly after the Games.
