= Viachaslau Makaranka =

Belarusian Greco-Roman wrestler (born 1975)

Medal record

Men's Greco-Roman wrestling

Representing Belarus

Olympic Games
Bronze medal – third place	2004 Athens	84 kg

Viachaslau Makaranka (born September 19, 1975) is a wrestler from Belarus who competed at the 2000 Summer Olympics and the 2004 Summer Olympics, winning a bronze medal at the latter.
