= Sándor Bárdosi =

Hungarian mixed martial arts fighter

- Born: Sándor István Bárdosi; 29 April 1977 (age 49); Budapest, Hungary
- Nationality: Hungarian
- Height: 5 ft 9 in (175 cm)
- Weight: 185 lb (84 kg; 13 st 3 lb)
- Division: Middleweight
- Style: Greco-Roman wrestling
- Fighting out of: Budapest, Hungary
- Team: Hungarian Top Team; Bárdosi Combat Sport Academy
- Wrestling: Olyimpian Wrestler
- Years active: 2008–2009 (MMA); 2000-2007 (Wrestling)

Mixed martial arts record
- Total: 1
- Wins: 1
- By knockout: 0
- By submission: 1
- By decision: 0
- Losses: 0
- By submission: 0

Amateur record
- Total: 2
- Wins: 1
- By knockout: 1
- Losses: 1
- By submission: 1

Other information
- Mixed martial arts record from Sherdog

Sándor István Bárdosi (born 29 April 1977) is a Hungarian former wrestler and former mixed martial artist who competed in the 2000 Summer Olympics.

== Mixed martial arts record ==
Professional record breakdown
1 match	1 win	0 losses
By knockout	0	0
By submission	1	0
By decision	0	0

Res.	Record	Opponent	Method	Event	Date	Round	Time	Location	Notes
Win	1–0	Paulius Poska	Submission (arm triangle choke)	K1 Europe Grand Prix 2008 Final Elimination	February 9, 2008	1	1:14	Budapest, Hungary	K1 Middleweight Grand Prix elimination Round. Later released from the tournament by injuries.

== Mixed martial arts amateur record ==
Amateur record breakdown		
2 matches	1 win	1 loss
By knockout	1	0
By submission	0	1

Res.	Record	Opponent	Method	Event	Date	Round	Time	Location	Notes
Win	1–1	István Frank	TKO (punches)	XLsport: K-3 Final	January 17, 2009	1	N/A	Budapest, Hungary	
Loss	0–1	Gusztáv Dietz	Submission (kneebar)	XLsport: K-3 Hungary	August 30, 2008	1	N/A	Budapest, Hungary	
