= Oleksandr Daragan =

Ukrainian Greco-Roman wrestler

Personal information
- Full name: Oleksandr Serhiyovych Darahan
- Nationality: Ukraine
- Born: 19 January 1978 (age 48) Dnipropetrovsk, Ukrainian SSR, Soviet Union
- Height: 1.80 m (5 ft 11 in)
- Weight: 84 kg (185 lb)

Sport
- Sport: Wrestling
- Event: Greco-Roman
- Club: Dynamo Mariupol
- Coached by: Sergey Daragan
Medal record
Men's Greco-Roman wrestling
Representing Ukraine
World Championships
| Bronze medal – third place | 2001 Patras | 85 kg |
European Championships
| Bronze medal – third place | 2001 Istanbul | 85 kg |

Oleksandr Serhiyovych Darahan (also Oleksandr Daragan, Ukrainian: Олександр Сергійович Дараган; born January 19, 1978, in Dnipropetrovsk) is an amateur Ukrainian Greco-Roman wrestler, who played for the men's light heavyweight category. In 2001, Daragan had won two bronze medals for his division at the World Wrestling Championships in Patras, Greece, and at the European Wrestling Championships in Istanbul, Turkey. He is also a member of the wrestling team for Dynamo Mariupol, and is coached and trained by his father Sergey Daragan.

Daragan made his official debut for the 2004 Summer Olympics in Athens, where he placed second in the preliminary pool of the men's 84 kg class, against Turkey's Hamza Yerlikaya, Bulgaria's Vladislav Metodiev, and Estonia's Tarvi Thomberg.

At the 2008 Summer Olympics in Beijing, Daragan competed for the second time in the men's 84 kg class. He received a bye for the preliminary round of sixteen match, before losing out to Iran's Saman Tahmasebi, with a three-set technical score (0–4, 2–1, 0–3), and a classification point score of 1–3.
