= Quincey Clark =

American wrestler (born 1972)

Quincy Clark
Personal information
- Full name: Quincey Lee Clark
- Born: New Brighton, Minnesota, U.S. June 5, 1972 (age 54)
Medal record
Representing United States
Men's Greco-Roman wrestling
Pan American Games
Silver medal – second place	1999 Winnipeg	85 kg
Pan American Championships
Silver medal – second place	2001 Santo Domingo	85 kg
Collegiate Wrestling
Representing the Oklahoma Sooners
NCAA Division I Championships
Silver medal – second place	1995 Iowa City	177 lb

Quincey Lee Clark (born June 5, 1972) is a former competitor in Greco-Roman wrestling, who represented the United States at the 2000 Summer Olympics. Clark also represented the U.S. at the 1998 and 1999 FILA World Wrestling Championships and the 1999 Pan American Games, where he won the silver medal. His highest placing in World-Level competition was 8th, at the World Championships in 1999.

Clark was also an All-American in Collegiate Wrestling for the University of Oklahoma in 1995, where he finished in 2nd place, losing to future freestyle wrestling World Champion, Les Gutches.

In September 2022, Clark was arrested by police, after they received a tip from a community member that he was involved in child sex abuse. In April 2024, he was convicted of 19 counts of child sexual abuse including charges of committing lewd acts on a child, sexual battery by restraint and forced oral copulation. He was sentenced to nineteen years and four months in prison.
