= Amor Bach Hamba =

Tunisian wrestler (born 1977)

Personal information
- Nationality: Tunisian
- Born: 13 August 1977 (age 48)

Sport
- Sport: Wrestling

Amor Bach Hamba (Arabic: عمر باش حامبة, born 13 August 1977) is a Tunisian wrestler. He competed in the men's Greco-Roman 85 kg at the 2000 Summer Olympics.
