= Aleksandar Jovančević =

Serbian strength coach and wrestler

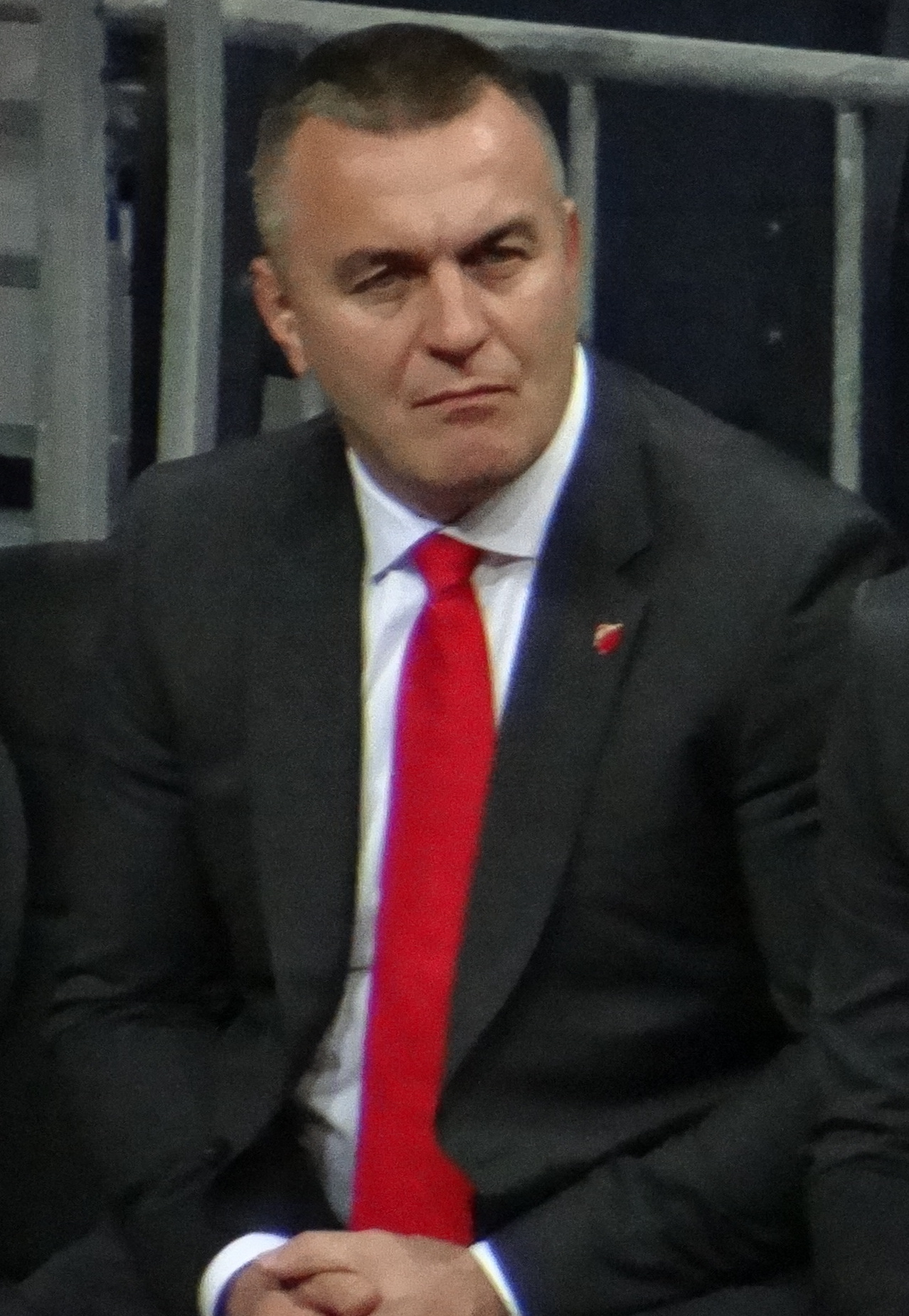
- Jovančević with Crvena zvezda in 2017.

Personal information
- Born: 5 June 1970 (age 56) Petrinja, SR Croatia, SFR Yugoslavia
- Position: Strength and conditioning coach
- Coaching career: 2000–present

Career history

Coaching
- 2013–2015: Vojvodina Srbijagas (conditioning)
- 2015–2017: Spartak (conditioning)
- 2017: FMP (conditioning)
- 2017–2018: Crvena zvezda (conditioning)

Aleksandar Jovančević
Personal information
- Height: 1.79 m (5 ft 10 1/2 in)
- Weight: 92 kg (203 lb)

Sport
- Country: FR Yugoslavia
- Sport: Wrestling
- Olympic class: 85 kg
- Event: Greco-Roman
- Club: Gavrilović Petrinja (1989–1991); Partizan (1992–1993); Vojvodina (1994–1998)
Medal record
Men's Wrestling
Representing FR Yugoslavia
European Championships
Bronze medal – third place	1997 Kouvola	85kg
Mediterranean Games
Bronze medal – third place	1997 Bari	85kg
- Updated on 28 July 2017

Aleksandar Jovančević (Serbian Cyrillic: Александар Јованчевић; born 5 June 1970) is a Serbian strength and conditioning coach and former wrestler. He represented FR Yugoslavia in Greco-Roman wrestling.

== International wrestling career ==
Jovančević competed in 82 kg men's Greco-Roman wrestling for FR Yugoslavia in 1996 Summer Olympics in Atlanta, US and placed 9th. In 1997, he won two bronze medals at the European Wrestling Championships in Kouvola, Finland and at the Mediterranean Games in Bari, Italy.

During his wrestling career he competed for wrestling clubs: Gavrilović Petrinja (1989–1991), Partizan (1992–1993) and Vojvodina (1994–1998).

== Strength and conditioning coaching career ==
Jovančević graduated physical education at the University of Novi Sad. He began his coaching career in 2000. Before he moved to train basketball players he worked with the Vojvodina handball and the Vojvodina water polo team in Novi Sad.

=== Basketball ===
Jovančević worked as a part of the coaching staff of Serbian coach Dušan Alimpijević while he worked for the Vojvodina Srbijagas, the Spartak and the FMP of the Basketball League of Serbia.

He joined the Crvena zvezda coaching staff after Alimpijević become their head coach for the 2017–18 season. He left the club after that season.

== Career achievements and awards ==
As wrestler

- Yugoslavia Wrestler of the Year Award: 1997
- The Bronze Order by Wrestling Federation of Serbia (2012)

As strength and conditioning coach

- Serbian League champion: 1 (with Crvena zvezda: 2017–18)
