= Aleksandr Menshchikov (wrestler) =

Russian wrestler

Personal information
- Nationality: Russian
- Born: 1 October 1973 (age 52) Kurgan, Russian SFSR, Soviet Union

Sport
- Sport: Wrestling

Aleksandr Menshchikov (born 1 October 1973) is a Russian former wrestler. He competed in the men's Greco-Roman 85 kg at the 2000 Summer Olympics.
