= Toomas Proovel =

Estonian wrestler (born 1973)

Personal information
- Nationality: Estonian
- Born: 29 September 1973 (age 52) Tartu, then part of Estonian SSR, Soviet Union

Sport
- Sport: Wrestling

Toomas Proovel (born 29 September 1973) is an Estonian wrestler. He competed in the men's Greco-Roman 85 kg at the 2000 Summer Olympics.
