= Brad Vering =

American wrestler (born 1977)

Personal information
- Born: August 21, 1977 (age 48) Schuyler, Nebraska, U.S.
- Height: 5 ft 9 in (175 cm)
- Weight: 84 kg (185 lb)

Sport
- Country: United States
- Sport: Wrestling
- Events: Greco-Roman and Folkstyle
- College team: Nebraska
- Club: New York Athletic Club
- Team: USA
- Coached by: Steve Fraser
Medal record
Men's Greco-Roman wrestling
Representing the United States
World Championships
Silver medal – second place	2007 Baku	84 kg
Pan American Games
Gold medal – first place	2007 Rio de Janeiro	84 kg
Silver medal – second place	2003 Santo Domingo	84 kg
Pan American Championships
Gold medal – first place	2007 San Salvador	84 kg
Silver medal – second place	2003 Guatemala City	84 kg
Collegiate Wrestling
Representing the Nebraska Cornhuskers
NCAA Division I Championships
Gold medal – first place	2000 St. Louis	197 lb

Bradley Vering (born August 21, 1977) is an American former Greco-Roman and folkstyle wrestler. He won a silver medal in Greco-Roman wrestling at the 2007 World Championships. He was also a member of the 2007 United States Greco-Roman World Champion Team. As a collegiate wrestler, he won an NCAA championship in 2000.

== Early years ==
Vering was born in Schuyler, Nebraska. He attended Howells High School in Howells, Nebraska and was a letterman in football and wrestling. Coached by Nebraska Hall of Fame member Lee Schroeder in wrestling, he was a three-time Nebraska State Champion and finished with a career record of 148–2.

== College ==
Vering attended the University of Nebraska–Lincoln. During his college wrestling career he was a three-time All-American and an NCAA champion as a junior. Vering placed 4th as a sophomore, won the national championship at the 197 pound weight class his junior year, and took 7th his senior year.

== Olympics and World Championships ==
Internationally, Vering was a World silver medalist in 2007, helping lead the United States to a Greco-Roman World Team Championship the same year. He competed at the Olympics in 2004 and 2008 on the USA Olympic Greco-Roman Team.

Vering's Greco-Roman wrestling achievements include:

- 2007 World Silver Medalist
- Fifth at 2002 and 2003 World Championships
- 2007 USA Greco-Roman World Championship Team Member
- Two-time U.S. Olympic Team Member (2004, 2008)
- Four-time U.S. World Team Member (2002, 2003, 2005, 2007)
- Four-time U.S. Nationals Champion (2003, 2004, 2005, 2007)
