= Attila Bátky =

Slovak Greco-Roman wrestler (born 1973)

Personal information
- Nationality: Slovakia
- Born: 23 January 1973 (age 53) Dunajská Streda, Trnava, Czechoslovakia
- Height: 1.80 m (5 ft 11 in)
- Weight: 84 kg (185 lb)

Sport
- Sport: Wrestling
- Event: Greco-Roman
- Club: ASK Dukla Trenčín
- Coached by: Petr Hirjak
Medal record
Men's Greco-Roman wrestling
Representing Slovakia
World Championships
Bronze medal – third place	2003 Créteil	84 kg

Attila Bátky (born 23 January 1973) is a Slovak amateur Greco-Roman wrestler, who played for the men's light heavyweight category. He won a bronze medal for his division at the 2003 World Wrestling Championships in Créteil, France, earning him a spot on the Slovak wrestling team for the Olympics. Batky is a member of the wrestling team for ASK Dukla Trenčín, and is coached and trained by Petr Hirjak.

Batky made his official debut for the 2004 Summer Olympics in Athens, where he placed third in the preliminary pool of the men's 84 kg class, against Sweden's Ara Abrahamian, Japan's Shingo Matsumoto, and Kyrgyzstan's Janarbek Kenjeev.

At the 2008 Summer Olympics in Beijing, Batky competed for the second time in the men's 84 kg class. He lost the qualifying round match to Cuba's Yunior Estrada, who was able to score nine points in two straight periods, leaving Batky without a single point.
