= Vladislav Metodiev =

Bulgarian Greco-Roman wrestler

Personal information
- Full name: Vladislav Metodiev
- Nationality: Bulgaria
- Born: 14 April 1980 (age 46) Kyustendil, Bulgaria
- Height: 1.91 m (6 ft 3 in)
- Weight: 84 kg (185 lb)

Sport
- Sport: Wrestling
- Event: Greco-Roman

Achievements and titles
- Olympic finals: 2004
Medal record
European Championships
Silver medal – second place	2013 Tbilisi	96 kg

Vladislav Metodiev (Bulgarian: Владислав Методиев; born April 14, 1980, in Kyustendil) is a Bulgarian Greco-Roman wrestler who participated in the 2004 Summer Olympics and finished 12th overall. He also participated in the 2013 European Wrestling Championships.
