= Mukhran Vakhtangadze =

Georgian wrestler (born 1973)

Medal record

Men's Greco-Roman wrestling

Representing Georgia

Olympic Games
Bronze medal – third place	2000 Sydney	85 kg

World Championships
Gold medal – first place	2001 Patras	85 kg

European Championships
Bronze medal – third place	2003 Belgrade	84 kg

Mukhran Vakhtangadze (Georgian: მუხრან ვახტანგაძე; born January 22, 1973, in Batumi) is a Georgian wrestler who competed in the Men's Freestyle 85 kg at the 2000 Summer Olympics and won the bronze medal. He also competed in the 2004 Summer Olympics, but was eliminated early.

Vakhtangadze won the World Championship in 2001. He has been a scholarship holder with the Olympic Solidarity program since February 2003.
