= Levon Geghamyan =

Armenian Greco-Roman wrestler

Personal information
- Born: 25 July 1977 (age 49) Akhuryan, Armenian SSR, Soviet Union
- Height: 1.78 m (5 ft 10 in)
- Weight: 84 kg (185 lb)

Sport
- Sport: Wrestling
- Event: Greco-Roman
- Club: Dynamo Gyumri
- Coached by: Ashot Nazaryan; Aram Gasparyan
Medal record
Men's Greco-Roman wrestling
Representing Armenia
European Championships
Silver medal – second place	2003 Belgrade	84 kg

Levon Geghamyan (Armenian: Լեւոն Գեղամյան, born 25 July 1977) is a retired Armenian Greco Roman wrestler.

He became a Cadet World Champion in 1993, a Junior World Champion in 1994, and a Junior European Champion in 1997. Geghamyan won a silver medal at the 2003 European Wrestling Championships. Geghamyan is also a three-time Olympian, having competed at the 1996 Summer Olympics, 2000 Summer Olympics, and 2004 Summer Olympics. His most noteworthy Olympic win was against 2008 Olympic gold medalist Andrea Minguzzi, whom Geghamyan defeated via grand superiority (11–0) at the 2004 Olympics.
