= Thomas Zander (wrestler) =

German amateur wrestler (born 1967)

Personal information
- Born: 25 August 1967 (age 59) Aalen, West Germany
- Height: 1.76 m (5 ft 9 1/2 in)
- Weight: 90 kg (198 lb)

Sport
- Sport: Wrestling
- Event: Greco-Roman
- Club: KSV Aalen
- Coached by: Lothar Ruch; Hans Juergen Weichert
Medal record
Men's Greco-Roman wrestling
Representing Germany
Olympic Games
Silver medal – second place	1996 Atlanta	82 kg
World Championships
Gold medal – first place	1994 Tampere	82 kg
Bronze medal – third place	1995 Atlanta	82 kg
Bronze medal – third place	1997 Krasnojarsk	85 kg
Silver medal – second place	1999 Athens	85 kg
European Championships
Bronze medal – third place	1991 Aschaffenburg	82 kg
Gold medal – first place	1992 Copenhagen	82 kg
Gold medal – first place	1993 Istanbul	82 kg
Gold medal – first place	1994 Athens	82 kg
Silver medal – second place	1997 Kouvola	85 kg
Representing West Germany
European Championships
Gold medal – first place	1990 Poznan	82 kg

Thomas Zander (born 25 August 1967) is a German Greco-Roman wrestler. He won a silver medal at the 1996 Summer Olympics. Zander also won four medals at the World Wrestling Championships, including gold in 1994, and six medals at the European Wrestling Championships, including gold in 1990, 1992, 1993, and 1994. Sabejew was also a two-time World Championships medalist, winning gold in 1994 and silver in 1995.
