= Martin Lidberg =

Swedish Greco-Roman (born 1973)

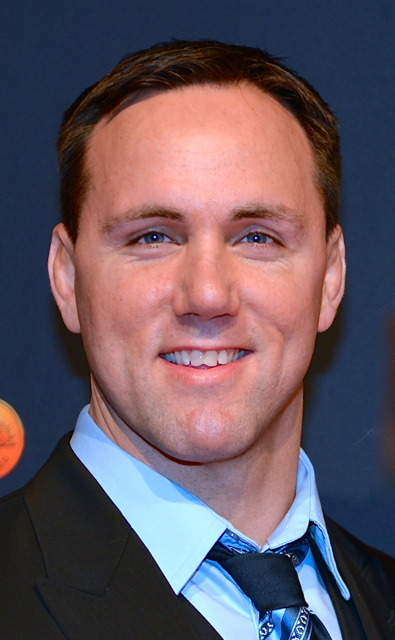
- Martin Lidberg during the Swedish Sports Awards of January 2014

Personal information
- National team: Sweden
- Born: February 1, 1973 (age 53) Farsta, Sweden

Sport
- Country: Sweden
- Sport: amateur wrestling

Martin Johan Lidberg (born 1 February 1973) is a Swedish former professional wrestler. He is a world champion, two-time European champion as well as 19-time Swedish champion. He has competed in the olympics three times (last time in Athens). In 2007 he won Let's Dance 2007 in Sweden together with his dancing partner Cecilia Ehrling, defeating Tobbe Blom, host of Idol 2005. Lidberg and Ehrling represented Sweden in the Eurovision Dance Contest 2007, where they placed 14th.

Lidberg defeated MMA fighter Dan Henderson at the 1996 Olympics.

In the 2004 Olympic Games in Athens, he failed to qualify for the Wrestling semi-finals when he was beaten by Russian wrestler Gogi Koguashvili. He decided to retire from wrestling at the conclusion of the 2004 Olympics.

In 2017, he participated in Mästarnas mästare, and won.

Lidberg participates in Bahador Shahidi's documentary film Jimmy the Wrestler (2021) about his younger brother, fellow wrestler Jimmy Lidberg.

His son, Isac Lidberg, is a professional footballer who plays as a forward for 2. Bundesliga club Darmstadt 98 and the Sweden national team.

== Accomplishments ==
=== Greco-Roman Wrestling ===
- 2004 Gold medal (96 kg) - European championships
- 2003 Gold medal (96 kg) - World championships
- 2000 Gold medal (85 kg) - European championships
- 2000 Sixth place - the Olympics
- 1999 Fifth place - World championships
- 1999 Silver medal - European championships
- 1998 Bronze medal - European championships
- 1998 Bronze medal - World championships
- 1997 Fourth place - World championships
- 1996 Sixth place - the Olympics

Preceded by Måns Zelmerlöw & Maria Karlsson	Let's Dance winner Season 2 (2007 with Cecilia Erling)	Succeeded by Tina Nordström & Tobias Karlsson
