= Luis Enrique Méndez =

Cuban Greco-Roman wrestler

Personal information
- Born: November 16, 1973 (age 52) Pinar del Río, Cuba

Sport
- Sport: Greco-Roman wrestling
Medal record
Men's Greco-Roman wrestling
Representing Cuba
World Championships
Gold medal – first place	1999 Ankara	85 kg
World Cup
Gold medal – first place	2005 Tehran	84 kg
Pan American Games
Gold medal – first place	1999 Winnipeg	85 kg
Gold medal – first place	2003 Santo Domingo	84 kg
Pan American Championships
Gold medal – first place	1997 San Juan	85 kg
Gold medal – first place	1998 Winnipeg	85 kg
Gold medal – first place	2001 Santo Domingo	85 kg
Gold medal – first place	2002 Maracaibo	84 kg
Gold medal – first place	2003 Guatemala	84 kg
Gold medal – first place	2005 Guatemala City	84 kg
Gold medal – first place	2006 Rio de Janeiro	84 kg
Silver medal – second place	2000 Cali	84 kg

Luis Enrique Méndez (born November 16, 1973) is a former world champion in Greco-Roman wrestling competing for Cuba.

Méndez represented Cuba at the 2000 Olympics, as well as 5 World Championships. His greatest accomplishment was a gold medal at the 1999 World Wrestling Championships.
