= Fritz Aanes =

Norwegian Greco-Roman wrestler

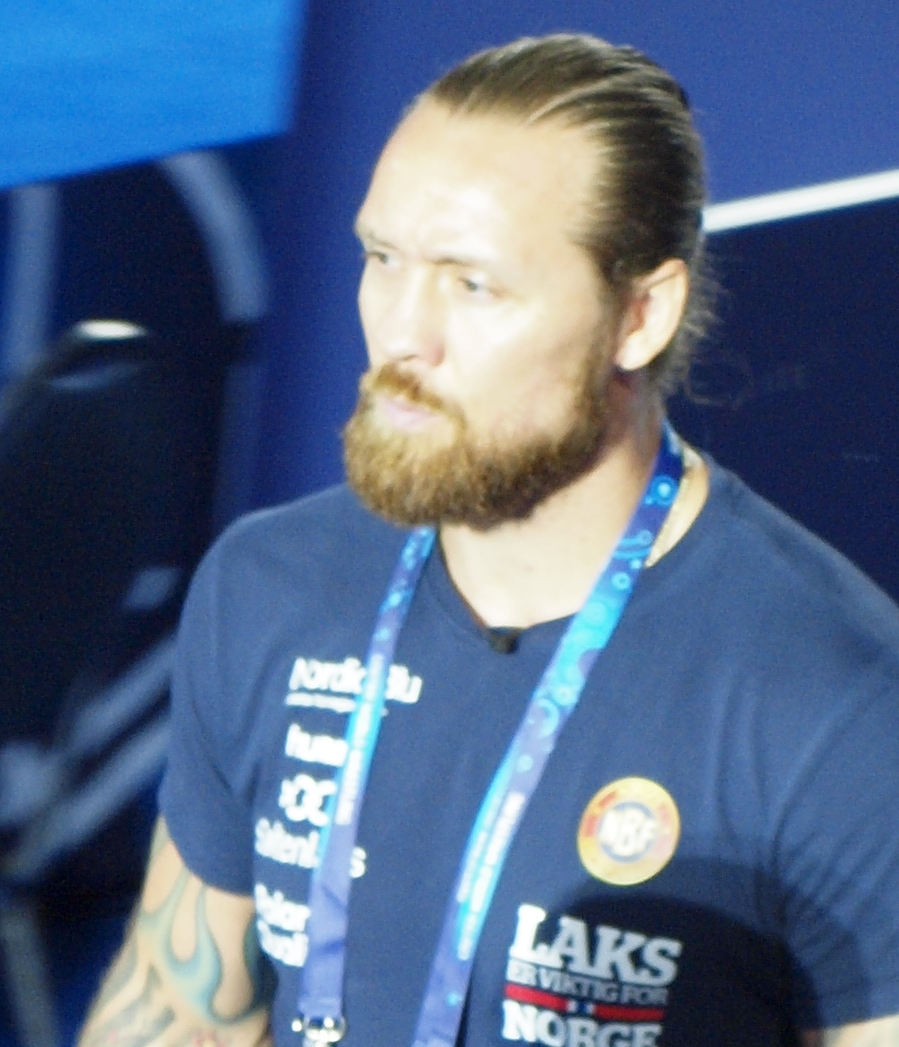
- Aanes at the 2021 World Wrestling Championships

Personal information
- Born: 20 July 1978 (age 47) Narvik, Norway
- Height: 1.87 m (6 ft 1 1/2 in)

Sport
- Country: Norway
- Sport: Wrestling
- Event: Greco-Roman
- Club: Narvik Atletklubb
Medal record
Representing Norway
Nordic Championships
Gold medal – first place	2002 Herning	96 kg
Silver medal – second place	1998 Vaajakoski	85 kg
Silver medal – second place	2005 Narvik	96 kg
Bronze medal – third place	2003 Eslöv	96 kg

Fritz Aanes (born 20 July 1978) is a Norwegian Greco-Roman wrestling coach, TV personality and former wrestler. He is a two-time Olympian and competed in the Greco-Roman 85 kg event at the 2000 Summer Olympics and in the Greco-Roman 84 kg event at the 2004 Summer Olympics. He is a Nordic Championships gold, two-time silver, and bronze medallist, and eight-time national champion.

Aanes placed fourth at the 2000 Summer Olympics, but was later disqualified after testing positive for the banned substance nandrolone and was banned for 15 months. Aanes retired from competing in 2008. Following his retirement, he became part of the coaching staff of the Norwegian national wrestling team in 2013 and was head coach from 2017 to 2022. Aanes has also made appearances in Norwegian reality TV series and competitions.
