= 2007 World Wrestling Championships – Men's Greco-Roman 84 kg =

Men's Greco-Roman 84 kg at the 2007 World Championships
- Venue: Heydar Aliyev Sports and Concert Complex
- Dates: 18 September 2007
- Competitors: 56 from 56 nations

Medalists
| gold medal | Aleksey Mishin | Russia |
| silver medal | Brad Vering | United States |
| bronze medal | Saman Tahmasebi | Iran |
| bronze medal | Badri Khasaia | Georgia |

The men's Greco-Roman 84 kilograms is a competition featured at the 2007 World Wrestling Championships, and was held at the Heydar Aliyev Sports and Concert Complex in Baku, Azerbaijan on 18 September 2007.

== Results ==
Legend

- C — Won by 3 cautions given to the opponent
- F — Won by fall
- R — Retired

=== Finals ===
| Semifinals | | | Final |
| Kim Jung-sub (KOR) | 0 | 1 |
| Brad Vering (USA) | 3 | 3^{F} | Brad Vering (USA) | 0 | 0 |
| Ara Abrahamian (SWE) | 0 | 0 | Aleksey Mishin (RUS) | 5 | 4 |
| Aleksey Mishin (RUS) | 4 | 3 |

=== Top half ===
==== Section 1 ====
Round of 64

Round of 32
Janarbek Kenjeev (KGZ) | 1 | 0
Kim Jung-sub (KOR) | 1 | 2
Kim-Jussi Nurmela (FIN) | 5 | 2
Eddy Bartolozzi (VEN) | 3 | 1
Manoj Kumar (IND) | 1 | 3
José Antonio Arias (DOM) | 1 | 0
Elvin Mursaliyev (AZE) | 0 | 0
Hannes Haring (AUT) | 4 | 5

Round of 16
Kim Jung-sub (KOR) | 4 | 3
Kim-Jussi Nurmela (FIN) | 1 | 1
Manoj Kumar (IND) | 0 | 1
Hannes Haring (AUT) | 4 | 3

Quarterfinals
Kim Jung-sub (KOR) | 4 | 7
Hannes Haring (AUT) | 0 | 0

==== Section 2 ====
Round of 64
Shingo Matsumoto (JPN) | 0 | 4 | 1
Saman Tahmasebi (IRI) | 2 | 0 | 1
Mohamed Rahmani (TUN) | 0 | 0
Nenad Žugaj (CRO) | 6 | 4
Mélonin Noumonvi (FRA) | 1 | 5 | 6
Ntante Charempasvili (GRE) | 1 | 0 | 0
Yunior Estrada (CUB) | 7 | 6
Dave McIntyre (AUS) | 0 | 0
Nikola Knežević (MNE) | 0 | 0
Brad Vering (USA) | 7 | 6
Denis Zdorikov (UZB) | 1 | 0
Bolat Abdullaev (UKR) | 1 | 2
Mats Rolfsen (NOR) | 0 | 3 | 0
Jan Fischer (GER) | 2 | 2 | 3
Hugues Bella-Lufu (RSA) | 1 | 6 | 0
Adrian Mocanu (MDA) | 10 | 4 | 3

Round of 32
Saman Tahmasebi (IRI) | 6 | 6^{C}
Nenad Žugaj (CRO) | 0 | 0
Mélonin Noumonvi (FRA) | 0 | 3 | 0
Yunior Estrada (CUB) | 3 | 0 | 2
Brad Vering (USA) | 4 | 4
Bolat Abdullaev (UKR) | 0 | 0
Jan Fischer (GER) | 2 | 3
Adrian Mocanu (MDA) | 0 | 0

Round of 16
Saman Tahmasebi (IRI) | 3 | 3
Yunior Estrada (CUB) | 0 | 2
Brad Vering (USA) | 3 | 4
Jan Fischer (GER) | 0 | 0

Quarterfinals
Saman Tahmasebi (IRI) | 1 | 3 | 1
Brad Vering (USA) | 2 | 0 | 2

=== Bottom half ===
==== Section 3 ====
Round of 64
Alo Toom (EST) | 0
Alim Selimau (BLR) | 3^{F}
Denis Nikolaev (ISR) | 6 | 5
Staņislavs Kuļikovs (LAT) | 0 | 0
Mario Baumgartner (SUI) | 0 | 0
Artur Michalkiewicz (POL) | 3 | 6
Ara Abrahamian (SWE) | 6 | 3^{F}
Andrea Minguzzi (ITA) | 0 | 0
Attila Bátky (SVK) | 3 | 1 | 3
Pedro García (ESP) | 1 | 3 | 1
Zoltán Fodor (HUN) | 4 | 4
Laimutis Adomaitis (LTU) | 0 | 0
Jonathan Rioux (CAN) | 9 | 7
Adrian Jaoude (BRA) | 0 | 1
Denis Forov (ARM) | 3 | 3
Vojtěch Kukla (CZE) | 0 | 0

Round of 32
Alim Selimau (BLR) | 3 | 5
Denis Nikolaev (ISR) | 1 | 3
Artur Michalkiewicz (POL) | 2 | 1 | 1
Ara Abrahamian (SWE) | 1 | 1 | 1
Attila Bátky (SVK) | 1 | 0 | 1
Zoltán Fodor (HUN) | 1 | 6 | 3
Jonathan Rioux (CAN) | 0 | 0
Denis Forov (ARM) | 6 | 4

Round of 16
Alim Selimau (BLR) | 0 | 1 | 1
Ara Abrahamian (SWE) | 2 | 1 | 1
Zoltán Fodor (HUN) | 2 | 0 | 3
Denis Forov (ARM) | 1 | 3 | 0

Quarterfinals
Ara Abrahamian (SWE) | 5 | 3
Zoltán Fodor (HUN) | 1 | 0

==== Section 4 ====
Round of 64
Cristian Mosquera (COL) | 1 | 3 | 0
Ma Sanyi (CHN) | 1 | 1 | 3
Larry Uwelur (FSM) | 0 | 0
Cătălin Surugiu (ROU) | 7 | 7
Juan Ramos (PUR) | 0 | 0
Ahmed Shaker (EGY) | 3 | 4
Bojan Mijatov (SRB) | 0 | 0
Nazmi Avluca (TUR) | 4 | 5
Aleksey Mishin (RUS) | 7^{F}
Muhammetmyrad Orazow (TKM) | 0
Yahia Abutabeekh (JOR) | 0 | 1 | 1
Vyacheslav Zubarev (KAZ) | 2 | 1 | 1
Wathiq Shawi (IRQ) | 0 | 0
Badri Khasaia (GEO) | 7 | 7
Hristo Marinov (BUL) | 6 | 3
Alfredo Ovando (CHI) | 0 | 0

Round of 32
Ma Sanyi (CHN) | 1 | 3
Cătălin Surugiu (ROU) | 1 | 2
Ahmed Shaker (EGY) | 1 | 3 | 0
Nazmi Avluca (TUR) | 3 | 1 | 5
Aleksey Mishin (RUS) | 2 | 3
Vyacheslav Zubarev (KAZ) | 0 | 0
Badri Khasaia (GEO) | 2 | 3
Hristo Marinov (BUL) | 0 | 0

Round of 16
Ma Sanyi (CHN) | 0
Nazmi Avluca (TUR) | 3^{F}
Aleksey Mishin (RUS) | 1 | 3
Badri Khasaia (GEO) | 1 | 0

Quarterfinals
Nazmi Avluca (TUR) | 1 | 1
Aleksey Mishin (RUS) | 1 | 1

=== Repechage ===
Repechage round 1
Nikola Knežević (MNE) | 0
Bolat Abdullaev (UKR) | 4^{F}
Muhammetmyrad Orazow (TKM) | 0 | 0
Vyacheslav Zubarev (KAZ) | 5 | 8^{F}

Repechage round 2
Bolat Abdullaev (UKR) | 0 | 4 | 0
Jan Fischer (GER) | 5 | 0 | 3
Vyacheslav Zubarev (KAZ) | 0 | R
Badri Khasaia (GEO) | 7

Repechage round 3
Jan Fischer (GER) | 1 | 0
Saman Tahmasebi (IRI) | 3 | 4
Badri Khasaia (GEO) | 4 | 3
Nazmi Avluca (TUR) | 2 | 0

Bronze medals
Saman Tahmasebi (IRI) | 2 | 0 | 2
Kim Jung-sub (KOR) | 0 | 4 | 1
Badri Khasaia (GEO) | 3 | 1 | 2
Ara Abrahamian (SWE) | 0 | 1 | 1
