= Hungary at the 2008 Summer Olympics =

- IOC code: HUN
- NOC: Hungarian Olympic Committee
- Website: www.olimpia.hu (in Hungarian and English)

in Beijing
- Competitors: 171 in 18 sports
- Flag bearers: Zoltán Kammerer (opening); Attila Vajda (closing)
- Medals Ranked 21st: Gold 3 Silver 5 Bronze 2 Total 10

Summer Olympics appearances (overview)
- 1896; 1900; 1904; 1908; 1912; 1920; 1924; 1928; 1932; 1936; 1948; 1952; 1956; 1960; 1964; 1968; 1972; 1976; 1980; 1984; 1988; 1992; 1996; 2000; 2004; 2008; 2012; 2016; 2020; 2024; 2028

Other related appearances
- 1906 Intercalated Games

Hungary competed at the 2008 Summer Olympics in Beijing, China. The country sent 131 individual competitors (77 men and 54 women) plus the men's and women's water polo teams and the women's handball team (13+13 + 14 athletes, respectively) for a total of 171 athletes taking part in the 2008 Summer Olympics. Hungary's gold medal count of 3 was the lowest in the nation's Summer Olympic history since the 1924 Paris Summer Olympics. Its total medal count of 10 was the lowest since the 1928 Summer Olympics in Amsterdam.

== Medalists ==
Medal	Name	Sport	Event	Date
Gold	Attila Vajda	Canoeing	Men's C-1 1000 m	22 August
Gold	Natasa Dusev-Janics; Katalin Kovács	Canoeing	Women's K-2 500 m	23 August
Gold	Hungary men's national water polo team: Zoltán Szécsi; Tamás Varga; Norbert Madaras; Dénes Varga; Tamás Kásás; Norbert Hosnyánszky; Gergely Kiss; Tibor Benedek; Dániel Varga; Péter Biros; Gábor Kis; Tamás Molnár; István Gergely	Water polo	Men's tournament	24 August
Silver	László Cseh	Swimming	Men's 400 m individual medley	10 August
Silver	László Cseh	Swimming	Men's 200 m butterfly	13 August
Silver	Zoltán Fodor	Wrestling	Men's Greco-Roman 84 kg	14 August
Silver	László Cseh	Swimming	Men's 200 m individual medley	15 August
Silver	Natasa Dusev-Janics; Katalin Kovács; Danuta Kozák; Gabriella Szabó	Canoeing	Women's K-4 500 m	22 August
Bronze	Ildikó Mincza-Nébald	Fencing	Women's individual épée	13 August
Bronze	Tamás Kiss; György Kozmann	Canoeing	Men's C-2 1000 m	22 August

Medals by sport
Sport	1st place, gold medalist(s)	2nd place, silver medalist(s)	3rd place, bronze medalist(s)	Total
Canoeing	2	1	1	4
Water polo	1	0	0	1
Swimming	0	3	0	3
Wrestling	0	1	0	1
Fencing	0	0	1	1
Total	3	5	2	10

== Athletics ==
Key

- Note–Ranks given for track events are within the athlete's heat only
- Q = Qualified for the next round
- q = Qualified for the next round as a fastest loser or, in field events, by position without achieving the qualifying target
- NR = National record
- N/A = Round not applicable for the event
- Bye = Athlete not required to compete in round

Men
Track & road events

Athlete	Event	Heat		Quarterfinal		Semifinal		Final	
Athlete	Event	Result	Rank	Result	Rank	Result	Rank	Result	Rank
Zoltán Czukor	50 km walk	—N/a						4:20:07	46
Dániel Kiss	110 m hurdles	13.61	3 Q	13.63	5	Did not advance			

Field events

Athlete	Event	Qualification		Final	
Athlete	Event	Distance	Position	Distance	Position
Róbert Fazekas	Discus throw	62.64	11 q	63.43	8
Zoltán Kővágó	Discus throw	60.79	21	Did not advance	
Lajos Kürthy	Shot put	18.74	34	Did not advance	
Gábor Máté	Discus throw	62.44	13	Did not advance	
Csongor Olteán	Javelin throw	NM	—	Did not advance	
Krisztián Pars	Hammer throw	80.27	1 Q	80.96	4

Combined events – Decathlon

Athlete	Event	100 m	LJ	SP	HJ	400 m	110H	DT	PV	JT	1500 m	Final	Rank
Attila Zsivoczky	Result	11.86	NM	DNS	—	—	—	—	—	—	—	DNF	
Attila Zsivoczky	Points	679	0	0	—	—	—	—	—	—	—	DNF	

Women
Track & road events

Athlete	Event	Heat		Semifinal		Final	
Athlete	Event	Result	Rank	Result	Rank	Result	Rank
Edina Füsti	20 km walk	—N/a				1:37:03	39
Anikó Kálovics	10000 m	—N/a				32:24.83	22
Krisztina Papp	5000 m	16:08.86	13	—N/a		Did not advance	
Barbara Petráhn	400 m	53.06	4	Did not advance			
Beáta Rakonczai	Marathon	—N/a				DNF	
Petra Teveli	Marathon	—N/a				2:48:32	65
Edit Vári	100 m hurdles	13.59	8	Did not advance			

Field events

Athlete	Event	Qualification		Final	
Athlete	Event	Distance	Position	Distance	Position
Krisztina Molnár	Pole vault	4.15	26	Did not advance	
Éva Orbán	Hammer throw	65.41	34	Did not advance	
Nikolett Szabó	Javelin throw	57.15	22	Did not advance	

Combined events – Heptathlon

Athlete	Event	100H	HJ	SP	200 m	LJ	JT	800 m	Final	Rank
Györgyi Farkas	Result	14.66	1.74	12.06	26.10	6.09	43.45	2:14.05	5760	28*
Györgyi Farkas	Points	887	903	665	788	877	734	906	5760	28*

* The athlete who finished in second place, Lyudmila Blonska of Ukraine, tested positive for a banned substance. Both the A and the B tests were positive, therefore Blonska was stripped of her silver medal, and Farkas moved up a position.

== Boxing ==
Hungary qualified five boxers for the Olympic boxing tournament. Szellő qualified at the World Championships. Varga and Kalucza brought the Hungarian boxing squad up to four by qualifying at the first European qualifying event. Bedák was the fifth and final Hungarian to join the team, at the 2nd European tournament.

Athlete	Event	Round of 32	Round of 16	Quarterfinals	Semifinals	Final	
Athlete	Event	Opposition Result	Opposition Result	Opposition Result	Opposition Result	Opposition Result	Rank
Pál Bedák	Light flyweight	Zhakypov (KAZ); L 6–7	Did not advance				
Norbert Kalucza	Flyweight	Bye	Arroyo (PUR); L 6–14	Did not advance			
Miklós Varga	Lightweight	Akshalov (KAZ); L 3–12	Did not advance				
Gyula Káté	Light welterweight	Joyce (IRL); L 5–9	Did not advance				
Imre Szellő	Light heavyweight	Bye	González (VEN); W RSC	Jeffries (GBR); L 2–10	Did not advance		

== Canoeing ==
=== Sprint ===
Men

Athlete	Event	Heats		Semifinals		Final	
Athlete	Event	Time	Rank	Time	Rank	Time	Rank
Zoltán Benkő	K-1 1000 m	3:29.542	2 QS	3:34.473	3 Q	3:32.120	9
Ákos Vereckei	K-1 500 m	1:36.099	1 QS	1:42.155	3 Q	1:38.318	6
Attila Vajda	C-1 500 m	1:49.942	4 QS	1:51.029	1 Q	1:50.156	9
Attila Vajda	C-1 1000 m	3:55.319	1 QF	Bye		3:50.467	1st place, gold medalist(s)
Zoltán Kammerer; Gábor Kucsera	K-2 500 m	1:30.099	3 QF	Bye		1:30.285	4
Zoltán Kammerer; Gábor Kucsera	K-2 1000 m	3:17.636	1 QF	Bye		3:15.049	4
Tamás Kiss; György Kozmann	C-2 1000 m	3:46.020	4 QS	3:42.482	2 Q	3:40.258	3rd place, bronze medalist(s)
Mátyás Sáfrán; Mihály Sáfrán	C-2 500 m	1:43.642	6 QS	1:45.032	8	Did not advance	
István Beé; Gábor Bozsik; Márton Sík; Ákos Vereckei	K-4 1000 m	2:57.242	2 QF	Bye		2:59.009	5

Women

Athlete	Event	Heats		Semifinals		Final	
Athlete	Event	Time	Rank	Time	Rank	Time	Rank
Katalin Kovács	K-1 500 m	1:49.424	1 QF	Bye		1:51.139	4
Nataša Janić; Katalin Kovács	K-2 500 m	1:42.162	1 QF	Bye		1:41.308	1st place, gold medalist(s)
Nataša Janić; Katalin Kovács; Danuta Kozák; Gabriella Szabó	K-4 500 m	1:34.321	1 QF	Bye		1:32.971	2nd place, silver medalist(s)

Qualification Legend: QS = Qualify to semi-final; QF = Qualify directly to final

== Cycling ==
=== Road ===
Athlete	Event	Time	Rank
László Bodrogi	Men's road race	Did not finish	
László Bodrogi	Men's time trial	1:07:27	27
Péter Kusztor	Men's road race	6:35:44	66

=== Mountain biking ===
Athlete	Event	Time	Rank
András Parti	Men's cross-country	2:06:00	23

=== BMX ===
Athlete	Event	Seeding		Quarterfinals		Semifinals		Final	
Athlete	Event	Result	Rank	Points	Rank	Points	Rank	Result	Rank
Vilmos Radasics	Men's BMX	38.830	31	18	6	Did not advance			
Anikó Hódi	Women's BMX	41.772	15	—N/a		18	6	Did not advance	

== Diving ==
Women

Athlete	Events	Preliminaries		Semifinals		Final	
Athlete	Events	Points	Rank	Points	Rank	Points	Rank
Nóra Barta	3 m springboard	276.15	18 Q	318.15	11 Q	269.25	12
Villő Kormos	3 m springboard	247.95	24	Did not advance			

== Fencing ==
Men

Athlete	Event	Round of 64	Round of 32	Round of 16	Quarterfinal	Semifinal	Final / BM	
Athlete	Event	Opposition Score	Opposition Score	Opposition Score	Opposition Score	Opposition Score	Opposition Score	Rank
Gábor Boczkó	Individual épée	Bye	Rota (ITA); W 11–10	Fernández (VEN); W 15–9	Zawrotniak (POL); W 15–12	Jeannet (FRA); L 12–15	Abajo (ESP); L 7–8	4
Géza Imre	Individual épée	Bye	Kim S-G (KOR); W 15–14	Confalonieri (ITA); L 9–15	Did not advance			
Krisztián Kulcsár	Individual épée	Bye	Yin Lc (CHN); L 9–15	Did not advance				
Gábor Boczkó; Géza Imre; Iván Kovács; Krisztián Kulcsár	Team épée	—N/a			China; L 43–45	Classification semi-final Ukraine; W 41–29	5th place final Venezuela; W 40–25	5
Tamás Decsi	Individual sabre	Bye	Szilágyi (HUN); L 9–15	Did not advance				
Zsolt Nemcsik	Individual sabre	Bye	Zhou Hm (CHN); L 13–15	Did not advance				
Áron Szilágyi	Individual sabre	Bye	Decsi (HUN); W 15–9	Smart (USA); L 10–15	Did not advance			
Tamás Decsi; Balázs Lontay; Zsolt Nemcsik; Áron Szilágyi	Team sabre	—N/a			United States; L 44–45	Classification semi-final China; L 38–45	7th place final Egypt; W 45–25	7

Women

Athlete	Event	Round of 64	Round of 32	Round of 16	Quarterfinal	Semifinal	Final / BM	
Athlete	Event	Opposition Score	Opposition Score	Opposition Score	Opposition Score	Opposition Score	Opposition Score	Rank
Ildikó Mincza-Nébald	Individual épée	—N/a	Yeung C L (HKG); W 15–11	Schalm (CAN); W 15–13	Duplitzer (GER); W 15–11	Brânză (ROU); L 14–15	Li N (CHN); W 15–11	3rd place, bronze medalist(s)
Emese Szász	Individual épée	—N/a	Bentaleb (ALG); W 15–4	Shutova (RUS); L 12–15	Did not advance			
Edina Knapek	Individual foil	Bye	Sun C (CHN); W 15–13	Su Ww (CHN); W 15–10	Vezzali (ITA); L 3–15	Did not advance		
Aida Mohamed	Individual foil	Bye	Luan (CAN); W 15–7	Lamonova (RUS); L 5–15	Did not advance			
Gabriella Varga	Individual foil	Bye	González (VEN); W 2–15	Nam H-H (KOR); L 4–15	Did not advance			
Edina Knapek; Aida Mohamed; Virgine Ujlaky; Gabriella Varga	Team foil	—N/a			Germany; W 35–31	United States; L 33–35	Italy; L 23–32	4
Orsolya Nagy	Individual sabre	Bye	Touya (FRA); W 15–13	Ward (USA); L 5–15	Did not advance			

== Gymnastics ==
=== Artistic ===
Men

Athlete	Event	Qualification								Final							
Athlete	Event	Apparatus						Total	Rank	Apparatus						Total	Rank
Athlete	Event	F	PH	R	V	PB	HB	Total	Rank	F	PH	R	V	PB	HB	Total	Rank
Róbert Gál	Floor	13.425	—N/a					13.425	74	Did not advance							
Róbert Gál	Pommel horse	—N/a	13.225	—N/a				13.225	65	Did not advance							
Róbert Gál	Parallel bars	—N/a				12.900	—N/a	12.900	74	Did not advance							

Women

Athlete	Event	Qualification						Final					
Athlete	Event	Apparatus				Total	Rank	Apparatus				Total	Rank
Athlete	Event	F	V	UB	BB	Total	Rank	F	V	UB	BB	Total	Rank
Dorina Böczögő	All-around	13.200	13.375	13.950	13.925	54.450	52	Did not advance					

== Handball ==
=== Women's tournament ===
Roster

The following is the Hungary roster in the women's handball tournament of the 2008 Summer Olympics.

Head coach: János Hajdu

No.	Pos.	Name	Date of birth (age)	Height	App.	Goals	Club
2	CB	Bernadett Ferling	13 July 1977 (aged 31)	1.80 m	132	300	(Hungary) Dunaferr SE
6	LW	Orsolya Vérten	22 July 1982 (aged 26)	1.70 m	65	175	(Hungary) Győri Audi ETO KC
10	CB	Krisztina Pigniczki	18 September 1975 (aged 32)	1.71 m	143	224	(Hungary) Dunaferr SE
12	GK	Orsolya Herr	23 November 1984 (aged 23)	1.76 m	41	0	(Hungary) Győri Audi ETO KC
13	CB	Anita Görbicz	13 May 1983 (aged 25)	1.75 m	131	541	(Hungary) Győri Audi ETO KC
16	GK	Katalin Pálinger	6 December 1978 (aged 29)	1.83 m	212	1	(Hungary) Győri Audi ETO KC
17	LB	Tímea Tóth	16 September 1980 (aged 27)	1.82 m	111	333	(Austria) Hypo Niederösterreich
18	P	Piroska Szamoránszky	9 July 1986 (aged 22)	1.72 m	45	118	(Hungary) Budapest Bank-FTC
22	RW	Bernadett Bódi	9 March 1986 (aged 22)	1.75 m	5	9	(Denmark) Randers HK
23	LB	Gabriella Szűcs	31 August 1984 (aged 23)	1.84 m	66	101	(Hungary) DVSC-Aquaticum
26	P	Rita Borbás	21 December 1980 (aged 27)	1.67 m	59	106	(Romania) CS Oltchim Vâlcea
31	RB	Ágnes Hornyák	2 September 1982 (aged 25)	1.80 m	60	44	(Hungary) Győri Audi ETO KC
83	RW	Mónika Kovacsicz	20 November 1983 (aged 24)	1.70 m	45	130	(Denmark) Viborg HK
87	LB	Zsuzsanna Tomori	18 June 1987 (aged 21)	1.87 m	24	24	(Hungary) Győri Audi ETO KC

Group play

Team	Pld	W	D	L	GF	GA	GD	Pts	Qualification
Russia	5	4	1	0	148	125	+23	9	Qualified for the quarterfinals
South Korea	5	3	1	1	155	127	+28	7	Qualified for the quarterfinals
Hungary	5	2	1	2	129	142	−13	5	Qualified for the quarterfinals
Sweden	5	2	0	3	123	137	−14	4	Qualified for the quarterfinals
Brazil	5	1	1	3	124	137	−13	3	
Germany	5	1	0	4	123	134	−11	2	

9 August 2008; 10:45	Hungary	30 – 24	Sweden	Olympic Sports Centre Gymnasium; Referees: Licis, Stolarovs (LAT)
9 August 2008; 10:45	Vérten, Görbicz 7	(15–14)	Islas Helgesson 6	Olympic Sports Centre Gymnasium; Referees: Licis, Stolarovs (LAT)
9 August 2008; 10:45	2× (yellow card) 7× (suspension)	Report	2× (yellow card) 4× (suspension)	Olympic Sports Centre Gymnasium; Referees: Licis, Stolarovs (LAT)

11 August 2008; 10:45	Brazil	28 – 28	Hungary	Olympic Sports Centre Gymnasium; Referees: Baum, Goralczyk (POL)
11 August 2008; 10:45	Amorim 10	(12–17)	Görbicz 8	Olympic Sports Centre Gymnasium; Referees: Baum, Goralczyk (POL)
11 August 2008; 10:45	3× (yellow card) 6× (suspension)	Report	3× (yellow card) 6× (suspension) 1× (red card)	Olympic Sports Centre Gymnasium; Referees: Baum, Goralczyk (POL)

13 August 2008; 20:45	Germany	24 – 25	Hungary	Olympic Sports Centre Gymnasium; Referees: Gjeding, Hansen (DEN)
13 August 2008; 20:45	Krause 9	(14–12)	Görbicz 9	Olympic Sports Centre Gymnasium; Referees: Gjeding, Hansen (DEN)
13 August 2008; 20:45	3× (yellow card) 4× (suspension)	Report	4× (yellow card) 7× (suspension)	Olympic Sports Centre Gymnasium; Referees: Gjeding, Hansen (DEN)

15 August 2008; 20:45	Hungary	24 – 33	Russia	Olympic Sports Centre Gymnasium; Referees: Din, Dinu (ROU)
15 August 2008; 20:45	Görbicz 6	(15–16)	Postnova 8	Olympic Sports Centre Gymnasium; Referees: Din, Dinu (ROU)
15 August 2008; 20:45	3× (yellow card) 3× (suspension)	Report	3× (yellow card) 2× (suspension)	Olympic Sports Centre Gymnasium; Referees: Din, Dinu (ROU)

17 August 2008; 20:45	Hungary	22 – 33	South Korea	Olympic Sports Centre Gymnasium; Referees: Breto, Huelin (ESP)
17 August 2008; 20:45	Görbicz 7	(11–19)	Oh Seong-ok 6	Olympic Sports Centre Gymnasium; Referees: Breto, Huelin (ESP)
17 August 2008; 20:45	4× (yellow card) 5× (suspension)	Report	3× (yellow card) 3× (suspension)	Olympic Sports Centre Gymnasium; Referees: Breto, Huelin (ESP)

Quarterfinal

19 August 2008; 14:15	Romania	30 – 34	Hungary	Olympic Sports Centre Gymnasium; Referees: Liudowyk, Vakula (UKR)
19 August 2008; 14:15	Maier 11	(14–16)	Kovacsicz 7	Olympic Sports Centre Gymnasium; Referees: Liudowyk, Vakula (UKR)
19 August 2008; 14:15	3× (yellow card) 7× (suspension) 1× (red card)	Report	3× (yellow card) 2× (suspension)	Olympic Sports Centre Gymnasium; Referees: Liudowyk, Vakula (UKR)

Semifinal

21 August 2008; 20:15	Hungary	20 – 22	Russia	Beijing National Indoor Stadium; Referees: Baum, Goralczyk (POL)
21 August 2008; 20:15	Tóth 5	(9–14)	Bliznova 7	Beijing National Indoor Stadium; Referees: Baum, Goralczyk (POL)
21 August 2008; 20:15	4× (yellow card) 6× (suspension)	Report	3× (yellow card) 7× (suspension) 1× (red card)	Beijing National Indoor Stadium; Referees: Baum, Goralczyk (POL)

Bronze medal game

23 August 2008; 13:30	South Korea	33 – 28	Hungary	Beijing National Indoor Stadium; Referees: Chernega, Poladenko (RUS)
23 August 2008; 13:30	Moon Pil-hee 10	(13–15)	Ferling 7	Beijing National Indoor Stadium; Referees: Chernega, Poladenko (RUS)
23 August 2008; 13:30	3× (yellow card) 3× (suspension)	Report	3× (yellow card) 7× (suspension)	Beijing National Indoor Stadium; Referees: Chernega, Poladenko (RUS)

== Judo ==
Men

Athlete	Event	Preliminary	Round of 32	Round of 16	Quarterfinals	Semifinals	Repechage 1	Repechage 2	Repechage 3	Final / BM	
Athlete	Event	Opposition Result	Opposition Result	Opposition Result	Opposition Result	Opposition Result	Opposition Result	Opposition Result	Opposition Result	Opposition Result	Rank
Miklós Ungvári	−66 kg	Wu Rt (CHN); W 0011–0001	Kedelashvili (GEO); W 1000–0000	Gadanov (RUS); L 0002–0011	Did not advance						
Dániel Hadfi	−100 kg	—N/a	Ben Saleh (LBA); W 1001–0001	Moussima (CMR); W 1002–0010	Zhitkeyev (KAZ); L 0100–1111	Did not advance	Bye	Mekić (BIH); W 1001–0011	Matyjaszek (POL); L 0010–0011	Did not advance	
Barna Bor	+100 kg	Bye	El Shehaby (EGY); L 0010–0120	Did not advance							

Women

Athlete	Event	Round of 32	Round of 16	Quarterfinals	Semifinals	Repechage 1	Repechage 2	Repechage 3	Final / BM	
Athlete	Event	Opposition Result	Opposition Result	Opposition Result	Opposition Result	Opposition Result	Opposition Result	Opposition Result	Opposition Result	Rank
Éva Csernoviczki	−48 kg	Menezes (BRA); W 1000–0000	Dumitru (ROU); L 0010–0101	Did not advance		Bye	Kim Y-R (KOR); W 0001–0000	Pareto (ARG); L 0001–0110	Did not advance	
Bernadett Baczkó	−57 kg	Bye	Pekli (AUS); L 0100–0101	Did not advance		Bye	Jelassi (TUN); W 1011–0000	Harel (FRA); L 0010–0110	Did not advance	
Anett Mészáros	−70 kg	Bye	Kuzina (RUS); W 0010–0002	Ueno (JPN); L 0000–0200	Did not advance	Bye	Wang J (CHN); W 1010–0000	Rousey (USA); L 0000–1010	Did not advance	

== Modern pentathlon ==
Athlete	Event	Shooting (10 m air pistol)			Fencing (épée one touch)			Swimming (200 m freestyle)			Riding (show jumping)			Running (3000 m)			Total points	Final rank
Athlete	Event	Points	Rank	MP Points	Results	Rank	MP points	Time	Rank	MP points	Penalties	Rank	MP points	Time	Rank	MP Points	Total points	Final rank
Gábor Balogh	Men's	179	20	1084	19–16	10	856	2:07.32	21	1276	348	27	852	10:01.90	32	996	5064	26
Viktor Horváth	Men's	187	4	1180	16–19	21	784	2:05.17	15	1300	304	25	896	9:32.25	16	1112	5272	19
Leila Gyenesei	Women's	171	30	988	13–22	=29	712	2:13.84	4	1316	28	8	1172	11:02.35	25	1072	5260	24
Zsuzsanna Vörös	Women's	182	12	1120	15–20	=24	760	2:16.96	=11	1280	124	23	1076	11:04.30	26	1064	5300	20

== Rowing ==
Men

Athlete	Event	Heats		Repechage		Semifinals		Final	
Athlete	Event	Time	Rank	Time	Rank	Time	Rank	Time	Rank
Zsolt Hirling; Tamás Varga	Lightweight double sculls	6:19.60	3 R	6:50.48	4 SC/D	6:28.84	1 FC	6:23.02	14

Qualification Legend: FA=Final A (medal); FB=Final B (non-medal); FC=Final C (non-medal); FD=Final D (non-medal); FE=Final E (non-medal); FF=Final F (non-medal); SA/B=Semifinals A/B; SC/D=Semifinals C/D; SE/F=Semifinals E/F; QF=Quarterfinals; R=Repechage

== Sailing ==
Men

Athlete	Event	Race											Net points	Final rank
Athlete	Event	1	2	3	4	5	6	7	8	9	10	M*	Net points	Final rank
Áron Gádorfalvi	RS:X	15	19	16	12	24	~~26~~	10	9	18	13	EL	162	19
Zsombor Berecz	Laser	27	31	36	23	18	22	24	14	~~37~~	CAN	EL	232	29

Women

Athlete	Event	Race											Net points	Final rank
Athlete	Event	1	2	3	4	5	6	7	8	9	10	M*	Net points	Final rank
Diána Detre	RS:X	22	20	19	21	22	25	~~26~~	20	17	19	EL	211	22

M = Medal race; EL = Eliminated – did not advance into the medal race; CAN = Race cancelled;

== Shooting ==
Men

Athlete	Event	Qualification		Final	
Athlete	Event	Points	Rank	Points	Rank
Roland Gerebics	Double trap	136	9	Did not advance	
Péter Sidi	10 m air rifle	595	6 Q	698.4	6
Péter Sidi	50 m rifle prone	588	39	Did not advance	
Péter Sidi	50 m rifle 3 positions	1163	25	Did not advance	

Women

Athlete	Event	Qualification		Final	
Athlete	Event	Points	Rank	Points	Rank
Zsófia Csonka	10 m air pistol	378	29	Did not advance	
Zsófia Csonka	25 m pistol	287	27	Did not advance	
Diána Igaly	Skeet	66	13	Did not advance	
Anita Tóth	10 m air rifle	390	35	Did not advance	
Anita Tóth	50 m rifle 3 positions	569	37	Did not advance	

== Swimming ==
Men

Athlete	Event	Heat		Semifinal		Final	
Athlete	Event	Time	Rank	Time	Rank	Time	Rank
Richárd Bodor	100 m breaststroke	1:00.97	19	Did not advance			
László Cseh	200 m butterfly	1:54.48	2 Q	1:54.35	4 Q	1:52.70	2nd place, silver medalist(s)
László Cseh	200 m individual medley	1:58.29	2 Q	1:58.19	4 Q	1:56.52	2nd place, silver medalist(s)
László Cseh	400 m individual medley	4:09.26	2 Q	—N/a		4:06.16	2nd place, silver medalist(s)
Balázs Gercsák	400 m freestyle	3:54.14	32	—N/a		Did not advance	
Csaba Gercsák	10 km open water	—N/a				DNF	
Dániel Gyurta	100 m breaststroke	1:01.31	24	Did not advance			
Dániel Gyurta	200 m breaststroke	2:08.68 OR	1 Q	2:09.73	5 Q	2:09.22	5
Tamás Kerékjártó	200 m butterfly	1:57.29	22	Did not advance			
Tamás Kerékjártó	200 m individual medley	2:00.60	17	Did not advance			
Gergő Kis	1500 m freestyle	15:09.67	19	—N/a		Did not advance	
Gergő Kis	400 m individual medley	4:10.66	5 Q	—N/a		4:12.84	6
Norbert Kovács	200 m freestyle	1:49.34	35	Did not advance			
Ádám Madarassy	100 m butterfly	53.93	50	Did not advance			
Balázs Makány	100 m freestyle	49.27	28	Did not advance			
Roland Rudolf	100 m backstroke	56.25	36	Did not advance			
Roland Rudolf	200 m backstroke	1:59.44	19	Did not advance			
Krisztián Takács	50 m freestyle	22.14	14 Q	21.84	9	Did not advance	
Tamás Kerékjártó; Gergő Kis; Norbert Kovács; Dominik Kozma	4 × 200 m freestyle relay	7:14.14	13	—N/a		Did not advance	

Women

Athlete	Event	Heat		Semifinal		Final	
Athlete	Event	Time	Rank	Time	Rank	Time	Rank
Katalin Bor	200 m breaststroke	2:29.95	27	Did not advance			
Beatrix Boulsevicz	200 m butterfly	2:10.00	18	Did not advance			
Eszter Dara	100 m butterfly	58.39	13 Q	58.84	13	Did not advance	
Éva Dobár	50 m freestyle	26.33	41	Did not advance			
Katinka Hosszú	200 m individual medley	2:13.05	17	Did not advance			
Katinka Hosszú	400 m individual medley	4:37.55	12	—N/a		Did not advance	
Boglárka Kapás	400 m freestyle	4:16.22	29	—N/a		Did not advance	
Emese Kovács	200 m butterfly	2:12.73	27	Did not advance			
Zsuzsanna Jakabos	400 m individual medley	4:37.86	13	—N/a		Did not advance	
Ágnes Mutina	200 m freestyle	1:57.25	5 Q	1:58.15	11	Did not advance	
Réka Nagy	800 m freestyle	8:40.38	26	—N/a		Did not advance	
Réka Pecz	100 m breaststroke	1:12.17	41	Did not advance			
Nikolett Szepesi	100 m backstroke	1:01.77	24	Did not advance			
Nikolett Szepesi	200 m backstroke	2:11.47	18	Did not advance			
Orsolya Tompa	100 m freestyle	56.57	40	Did not advance			
Evelyn Verrasztó	200 m backstroke	2:11.02	17	Did not advance			
Evelyn Verrasztó	200 m individual medley	2:12.52	11 Q	2:12.18	9	Did not advance	
Eszter Dara; Zsuzsanna Jakabos; Ágnes Mutina; Evelyn Verrasztó	4 × 200 m freestyle relay	7:55.26	7 Q	—N/a		7:55.53	6

== Table tennis ==
Athlete	Event	Preliminary round	Round 1	Round 2	Round 3	Round 4	Quarterfinals	Semifinals	Final / BM	
Athlete	Event	Opposition Result	Opposition Result	Opposition Result	Opposition Result	Opposition Result	Opposition Result	Opposition Result	Opposition Result	Rank
János Jakab	Men's singles	Bye	Chila (FRA); W 4–3	Süß (GER); L 1–4	Did not advance					
Petra Lovas	Women's singles	Bye	Ódorová (SVK); L 2–4	Did not advance						
Georgina Póta	Women's singles	Bye		Hadačová (CZE); W 4–3	Wang N (CHN); L 0–4	Did not advance				
Krisztina Tóth	Women's singles	Bye		Paškauskienė (LTU); W 4–3	Wang C (USA); L 1–4	Did not advance				

== Tennis ==
Athlete	Event	Round of 64	Round of 32	Round of 16	Quarterfinals	Semifinals	Final / BM	
Athlete	Event	Opposition Score	Opposition Score	Opposition Score	Opposition Score	Opposition Score	Opposition Score	Rank
Ágnes Szávay	Women's singles	Zheng J (CHN); L 6–4, 3–6, 5–7	Did not advance					
Gréta Arn; Ágnes Szávay	Women's doubles	—N/a	Morita / Sugiyama (JPN); L 3–6, 3–6	Did not advance				

== Triathlon ==
Athlete	Event	Swim (1.5 km)	Trans 1	Bike (40 km)	Trans 2	Run (10 km)	Total Time	Rank
Csaba Kuttor	Men's	18:09	0:28	59:13	0:36	37:27	1:55:53.38	47
Zita Szabó	Women's	20:28	0:30	1:05:58	0:33	39:17	2:06:46.70	38

== Water polo ==
Hungary participated in both the men's and the women's tournaments. The men's team won the gold medal, while the women's team finished in fourth place.

=== Men's tournament ===
Roster

The following is the Hungarian roster in the men's water polo tournament of the 2008 Summer Olympics.

№	Name	Pos.	Height	Weight	Date of birth	Club
1	Zoltán Szécsi	GK	1.98 m (6 ft 6 in)	96 kg (212 lb)	22 December 1977	(Hungary) ZF Eger
2	Tamás Varga	CB	2.01 m (6 ft 7 in)	105 kg (231 lb)	14 July 1975	(Hungary) Szeged Beton
3	Norbert Madaras	D	1.91 m (6 ft 3 in)	91 kg (201 lb)	1 December 1979	(Italy) Pro Recco
4	Dénes Varga	D	1.93 m (6 ft 4 in)	97 kg (214 lb)	29 March 1987	(Hungary) Vasas SC
5	Tamás Kásás	D	2.00 m (6 ft 7 in)	94 kg (207 lb)	20 July 1976	(Italy) Pro Recco
6	Norbert Hosnyánszky	D	1.96 m (6 ft 5 in)	94 kg (207 lb)	4 March 1984	(Italy) Fiorentina
7	Gergely Kiss	CF	1.99 m (6 ft 6 in)	112 kg (247 lb)	21 September 1977	(Hungary) Honvéd-Domino
8	Tibor Benedek	D	1.90 m (6 ft 3 in)	96 kg (212 lb)	12 July 1972	(Italy) Pro Recco
9	Dániel Varga	D	2.00 m (6 ft 7 in)	95 kg (209 lb)	25 September 1983	(Hungary) Vasas SC
10	Péter Biros	D	1.94 m (6 ft 4 in)	95 kg (209 lb)	5 April 1976	(Hungary) ZF Eger
11	Gábor Kis	CF	1.94 m (6 ft 4 in)	108 kg (238 lb)	27 September 1982	(Hungary) ZF Eger
12	Tamás Molnár	CF	1.93 m (6 ft 4 in)	104 kg (229 lb)	2 August 1975	(Hungary) Honvéd-Domino
13	István Gergely	GK	2.01 m (6 ft 7 in)	112 kg (247 lb)	20 August 1976	(Hungary) Honvéd-Domino

Head coach: Dénes Kemény

Group play

Team	Pld	W	D	L	GF	GA	GD	Pts	Qualification
Hungary	5	4	1	0	60	36	+24	9	Qualified for the semifinals
Spain	5	4	0	1	52	34	+18	8	Qualified for the quarterfinals
Montenegro	5	2	2	1	43	33	+10	6	Qualified for the quarterfinals
Australia	5	2	1	2	45	40	+5	5	Will play for places 7–10
Greece	5	1	0	4	39	56	−17	2	Will play for places 7–12
Canada	5	0	0	5	21	61	−40	0	Will play for places 7–12

All times are China Standard Time (UTC+8).

10 August 2008; 10:50	Report	Hungary	10–10	Montenegro	Ying Tung Natatorium, Beijing; Referees: Margeta (SLO), Caputi (ITA)
10 August 2008; 10:50	Report	Score by quarters: 3–3, 3–1, 2–4, 2–2			Ying Tung Natatorium, Beijing; Referees: Margeta (SLO), Caputi (ITA)
10 August 2008; 10:50	Report	Dé. Varga 2, Kásás 2, Benedek 2	Goals	M. Janović 4, Ivović 2, Gojković 2	Ying Tung Natatorium, Beijing; Referees: Margeta (SLO), Caputi (ITA)

12 August 2008; 14:00	Report	Greece	6–17	Hungary	Ying Tung Natatorium, Beijing; Referees: Rak (CRO), Ciric (SRB)
12 August 2008; 14:00	Report	Score by quarters: 2–7, 2–2, 1–4, 1–4			Ying Tung Natatorium, Beijing; Referees: Rak (CRO), Ciric (SRB)
12 August 2008; 14:00	Report	Schizas 2	Goals	Biros 4, Benedek 3, Madaras 2, Dá. Varga 2, Molnár 2	Ying Tung Natatorium, Beijing; Referees: Rak (CRO), Ciric (SRB)

14 August 2008; 12:10	Report	Hungary	8–5	Spain	Ying Tung Natatorium, Beijing; Referees: Ciric (SRB), Chaney (USA)
14 August 2008; 12:10	Report	Score by quarters: 2–3, 4–2, 0–0, 2–0			Ying Tung Natatorium, Beijing; Referees: Ciric (SRB), Chaney (USA)
14 August 2008; 12:10	Report	Dé. Varga 2, Benedek 2, Kis 2	Goals	Molina 2	Ying Tung Natatorium, Beijing; Referees: Ciric (SRB), Chaney (USA)

16 August 2008; 15:20	Report	Australia	12–13	Hungary	Ying Tung Natatorium, Beijing; Referees: Klopper (NED), Rak (CRO)
16 August 2008; 15:20	Report	Score by quarters: 4–4, 1–5, 4–2, 3–2			Ying Tung Natatorium, Beijing; Referees: Klopper (NED), Rak (CRO)
16 August 2008; 15:20	Report	Figlioli 3, Whalan 2	Goals	Molnár 3, Kiss 2, Biros 2, Kis 2	Ying Tung Natatorium, Beijing; Referees: Klopper (NED), Rak (CRO)

18 August 2008; 10:50	Report	Hungary	12–3	Canada	Ying Tung Natatorium, Beijing; Referees: Ciric (SRB), Littlejohn (GBR)
18 August 2008; 10:50	Report	Score by quarters: 3–1, 3–0, 1–2, 5–0			Ying Tung Natatorium, Beijing; Referees: Ciric (SRB), Littlejohn (GBR)
18 August 2008; 10:50	Report	Madaras 2, Kásás 2, Biros 2, Molnár 2	Goals	Graham 2	Ying Tung Natatorium, Beijing; Referees: Ciric (SRB), Littlejohn (GBR)

Semifinal

22 August 2008; 18:20	Report	Hungary	11–9	Montenegro	Ying Tung Natatorium, Beijing; Referees: Simion (ROU), Tulga (TUR)
22 August 2008; 18:20	Report	Score by quarters: 3–4, 3–3, 3–0, 2–2			Ying Tung Natatorium, Beijing; Referees: Simion (ROU), Tulga (TUR)
22 August 2008; 18:20	Report	Kiss 3, Madaras 2	Goals	N. Janović 2, Uskoković 2, Gojković 2	Ying Tung Natatorium, Beijing; Referees: Simion (ROU), Tulga (TUR)

Final

24 August 2008; 15:40	Report	(gold) Hungary	14–10	United States (silver)	Ying Tung Natatorium, Beijing; Referees: Turcotte (CAN), Brguljan (MNE)
24 August 2008; 15:40	Report	Score by quarters: 6–4, 3–4, 2–1, 3–1			Ying Tung Natatorium, Beijing; Referees: Turcotte (CAN), Brguljan (MNE)
24 August 2008; 15:40	Report	Dá. Varga 3, Biros 3, Dé. Varga 2	Goals	Azevedo 4, Beaubien 2, Smith 2	Ying Tung Natatorium, Beijing; Referees: Turcotte (CAN), Brguljan (MNE)

=== Women's tournament ===
Roster

The following is the Hungarian roster in the women's water polo tournament of the 2008 Summer Olympics.

№	Name	Pos.	Height	Weight	Date of birth	Club
1	Patricia Horvath	GK	1.83 m (6 ft 0 in)	73 kg (161 lb)	7 December 1977	(Hungary) Honvéd-Domino
2	Krisztina Szremkó	CB	1.80 m (5 ft 11 in)	84 kg (185 lb)	6 January 1972	(Hungary) Szentes
3	Anett Györe	D	1.72 m (5 ft 8 in)	70 kg (150 lb)	10 December 1981	(Hungary) Honvéd-Domino
4	Dóra Kisteleki	D	1.73 m (5 ft 8 in)	62 kg (137 lb)	11 May 1983	(Hungary) Honvéd-Domino
5	Mercédesz Stieber	D	1.74 m (5 ft 9 in)	70 kg (150 lb)	4 September 1974	(Italy) Florence
6	Orsolya Takács	D	1.90 m (6 ft 3 in)	85 kg (187 lb)	20 May 1985	(Hungary) Ocmino-Erse
7	Rita Drávucz	D	1.80 m (5 ft 11 in)	66 kg (146 lb)	14 April 1980	(Italy) Florence
8	Krisztina Zantleitner	CB	1.84 m (6 ft 0 in)	72 kg (159 lb)	8 May 1974	(Hungary) Osc Budapest
9	Fruzsina Brávik	D	1.81 m (5 ft 11 in)	83 kg (183 lb)	6 October 1986	(Hungary) Dove Dunaújváros
10	Anikó Pelle	D	1.86 m (6 ft 1 in)	72 kg (159 lb)	28 September 1978	(Italy) Siracusa
11	Ágnes Valkai	D	1.68 m (5 ft 6 in)	64 kg (141 lb)	27 February 1981	(Italy) Rome
12	Ágnes Primász	D	1.77 m (5 ft 10 in)	65 kg (143 lb)	5 March 1980	(Hungary) Osc Budapest
13	Ildikó Zirighné Sós	GK	1.76 m (5 ft 9 in)	67 kg (148 lb)	27 December 1976	(Hungary) Osc Budapest

Head coach: Gabor Godova

Group play

Team	Pld	W	D	L	GF	GA	GD	Pts	Qualification
Hungary	3	2	1	0	28	20	+8	5	Qualified for semifinals
Australia	3	2	1	0	25	22	+3	5	Qualified for quarterfinals
Netherlands	3	1	0	2	27	27	0	2	Qualified for quarterfinals
Greece	3	0	0	3	16	27	−11	0	Will play for places 7th–8th

All times are China Standard Time (UTC+8).

11 August 2008; 13:00	Report	Hungary	11–9	Netherlands	Ying Tung Natatorium, Beijing; Referees: Massimiliano Caputi (ITA), Radoslaw Piotr Koryzna (POL)
11 August 2008; 13:00	Report	Score by quarters: 3–3, 3–2, 4–3, 1–1			Ying Tung Natatorium, Beijing; Referees: Massimiliano Caputi (ITA), Radoslaw Piotr Koryzna (POL)
11 August 2008; 13:00	Report	Pelle 4, Kisteleki 2, Stieber 2, Valkai 2	Goals	de Bruijn 4, van den Berg 3	Ying Tung Natatorium, Beijing; Referees: Massimiliano Caputi (ITA), Radoslaw Piotr Koryzna (POL)

13 August 2008; 13:00	Report	Hungary	7–7	Australia	Ying Tung Natatorium, Beijing; Referees: Mario Brguljan (MNE), Ahmet Erhan Tulga (TUR)
13 August 2008; 13:00	Report	Score by quarters: 1–1, 1–1, 1–2, 4–3			Ying Tung Natatorium, Beijing; Referees: Mario Brguljan (MNE), Ahmet Erhan Tulga (TUR)
13 August 2008; 13:00	Report	Drávucz 3, Pelle 2, Valkai 2	Goals	R. Rippon 2, B. Knox 2, M. Rippon 2	Ying Tung Natatorium, Beijing; Referees: Mario Brguljan (MNE), Ahmet Erhan Tulga (TUR)

15 August 2008; 15:40	Report	Hungary	10–4	Greece	Ying Tung Natatorium, Beijing; Referees: Alan Balfanbayev (KAZ), Decio Jr Patelli (BRA)
15 August 2008; 15:40	Report	Score by quarters: 1–1, 3–1, 3–0, 3–2			Ying Tung Natatorium, Beijing; Referees: Alan Balfanbayev (KAZ), Decio Jr Patelli (BRA)
15 August 2008; 15:40	Report	Kisteleki 2, Stieber 2, Drávucz 2, Pelle 2	Goals	Gerolymou 1, Liosi 1, Roumpesi 1, Asimaki 1	Ying Tung Natatorium, Beijing; Referees: Alan Balfanbayev (KAZ), Decio Jr Patelli (BRA)

Semifinals

19 August 2008; 15:40	Report	Hungary	7–8	Netherlands	Ying Tung Natatorium, Beijing; Referees: Mario Brguljan (MNE), Sergey Antsiferov (RUS)
19 August 2008; 15:40	Report	Score by quarters: 2–1, 1–3, 3–3, 1–1			Ying Tung Natatorium, Beijing; Referees: Mario Brguljan (MNE), Sergey Antsiferov (RUS)
19 August 2008; 15:40	Report	Pelle 3 Drávucz, Primász 2	Goals	van den Ham, van Belkum 3 Cabout, Sijbring 1	Ying Tung Natatorium, Beijing; Referees: Mario Brguljan (MNE), Sergey Antsiferov (RUS)

Bronze medal game

21 August 2008; 17:00	Report	(bronze) Australia	12–11 (OT, PSO)	Hungary	Ying Tung Natatorium, Beijing; Referees: Sergey Antsiferov (RUS), Mladen Rak (CRO)
21 August 2008; 17:00	Report	Score by quarters: 2–2, 1–3, 3–1, 1–1 OT: 2–1, 0–1 PSO: 3–2			Ying Tung Natatorium, Beijing; Referees: Sergey Antsiferov (RUS), Mladen Rak (CRO)
21 August 2008; 17:00	Report	Knox, Gynther 3 Fraser 2 Beadsworth, R. Rippon, Santoromito, M. Rippon 1	Goals	Kisteleki 4 Valkai 3 Drávucz 2 Zantleitner, Pelle 1	Ying Tung Natatorium, Beijing; Referees: Sergey Antsiferov (RUS), Mladen Rak (CRO)

== Weightlifting ==
Athlete	Event	Snatch		Clean & Jerk		Total	Rank
Athlete	Event	Result	Rank	Result	Rank	Total	Rank
János Baranyai	Men's −77 kg	145	=17	DNF	—	—	DNF

== Wrestling ==
Key:

- VT - Victory by Fall.
- PP - Decision by Points - the loser with technical points.
- PO - Decision by Points - the loser without technical points.

Men's freestyle

Athlete	Event	Qualification	Round of 16	Quarterfinal	Semifinal	Repechage 1	Repechage 2	Final / BM	
Athlete	Event	Opposition Result	Opposition Result	Opposition Result	Opposition Result	Opposition Result	Opposition Result	Opposition Result	Rank
István Veréb	−74 kg	Askren (USA); L 1–3 ^{PP}	Did not advance						20
Gergely Kiss	−96 kg	Ceban (MDA); W 3–1 ^{PP}	Kurbanov (UZB); L 1–3 ^{PP}	Did not advance					8
Ottó Aubéli	−120 kg	Bye	Temengil (PLW); W 3–1 ^{PP}	Musuľbes (SVK); L 1–3 ^{PP}	Did not advance				8

Men's Greco-Roman

Athlete	Event	Qualification	Round of 16	Quarterfinal	Semifinal	Repechage 1	Repechage 2	Final / BM	
Athlete	Event	Opposition Result	Opposition Result	Opposition Result	Opposition Result	Opposition Result	Opposition Result	Opposition Result	Rank
Tamás Lőrincz	−66 kg	Adikyan (ARM); W 3–1 ^{PP}	S Guénot (FRA); L 1–3 ^{PP}	Did not advance		Milián (CUB); L 1–3 ^{PP}	Did not advance		9
Péter Bácsi	−74 kg	Dantzler (USA); W 3–1 ^{PP}	Julfalakyan (ARM); W 3–1 ^{PP}	Samurgashev (RUS); W 3–1 ^{PP}	Kvirkvelia (GEO); L 0–5 ^{VT}	Bye		C Guénot (FRA); L 1–3 ^{PP}	5
Zoltán Fodor	−84 kg	Bye	Ma Sy (CHN); W 3–1 ^{PP}	Gadabadze (AZE); W 3–1 ^{PP}	Avluca (TUR); W 3–1 ^{PP}	Bye		Minguzzi (ITA); L 1–3 ^{PP}	2nd place, silver medalist(s)
Lajos Virág	−96 kg	Bye	Wheeler (USA); L 1–3 ^{PP}	Did not advance					17
Mihály Deák-Bárdos	−120 kg	Bye	Taub (CAN); W 3–1 ^{PP}	Szczepaniak (FRA); L 1–3 ^{PP}	Did not advance				8

Women's freestyle

Athlete	Event	Qualification	Round of 16	Quarterfinal	Semifinal	Repechage 1	Repechage 2	Final / BM	
Athlete	Event	Opposition Result	Opposition Result	Opposition Result	Opposition Result	Opposition Result	Opposition Result	Opposition Result	Rank
Marianna Sastin	−63 kg	Bye	Dugrenier (CAN); L 0–3 ^{PO}	Did not advance					15

== See also ==
- Hungary at the 2008 Summer Paralympics
