= Wrestling at the 2006 Asian Games – Men's Greco-Roman 84 kg =

Men's Greco-Roman 84 kg at the 2006 Asian Games
- Venue: Aspire Hall 4
- Date: 10 December 2006
- Competitors: 13 from 13 nations

Medalists
gold medal	Kim Jung-sub	South Korea
silver medal	Yahia Abutabeekh	Jordan
bronze medal	Janarbek Kenjeev	Kyrgyzstan
bronze medal	Shingo Matsumoto	Japan

The men's Greco-Roman 84 kg wrestling competition at the 2006 Asian Games in Doha was held on 10 December 2006 at the Aspire Hall 4.

This Greco-Roman wrestling competition consisted of a single-elimination tournament, with a repechage used to determine the winner of two bronze medals. The two finalists faced off for gold and silver medals. Each wrestler who lost to one of the two finalists moved into the repechage, culminating in a pair of bronze medal matches featuring the semifinal losers each facing the remaining repechage opponent from their half of the bracket.

Each bout consisted of up to three rounds, lasting two minutes apiece. The wrestler who scored more points in each round was the winner of that rounds; the bout finished when one wrestler had won two rounds (and thus the match).

== Schedule ==
All times are Arabia Standard Time (UTC+03:00)

Date	Time	Event
Sunday, 10 December 2006	09:00	Preliminary
Sunday, 10 December 2006	09:00	Quarterfinals
Sunday, 10 December 2006	09:00	Semifinals
Sunday, 10 December 2006	09:00	Repechages
Sunday, 10 December 2006	18:00	Finals

== Results ==
Legend

- F — Won by fall

=== Main bracket ===
Preliminary
Saman Tahmasebi (IRI)	4	7
Manoj Kumar (IND)	0	0
Ma Sanyi (CHN)	1	1	2
Vitaliy Zakharchenko (KAZ)	2	1	0
Ahmad El-Habeche (LIB)	0
Aleksandr Dokturishvili (UZB)	4^{F}
Kim Jung-sub (KOR)	3	1	4
Shingo Matsumoto (JPN)	0	1	0
Saed Aburokba (PLE)	0	0
Salah Ghaliah (SYR)	6	2^{F}

Quarterfinals
Idrees Rahman (QAT)	0	0
Yahia Abutabeekh (JOR)	6	5
Janarbek Kenjeev (KGZ)	4	1	5^{F}
Saman Tahmasebi (IRI)	1	4	0
Ma Sanyi (CHN)	3	1
Aleksandr Dokturishvili (UZB)	6	1
Kim Jung-sub (KOR)	7	3
Salah Ghaliah (SYR)	0	2

Semifinals
Yahia Abutabeekh (JOR)	1	1	1
Janarbek Kenjeev (KGZ)	1	1	1
Aleksandr Dokturishvili (UZB)	1	1	1
Kim Jung-sub (KOR)	1	1	3

Gold medal match
Yahia Abutabeekh (JOR)	1	1
Kim Jung-sub (KOR)	1	2

=== Repechage ===
Repechage
Shingo Matsumoto (JPN)	1	4^{F}
Salah Ghaliah (SYR)	1	0

Bronze medal match
Idrees Rahman (QAT)	6	0	0
Janarbek Kenjeev (KGZ)	0	7	7
Shingo Matsumoto (JPN)	1	1
Aleksandr Dokturishvili (UZB)	1	1

== Final standing ==
Rank	Athlete
1st place, gold medalist(s)	Kim Jung-sub (KOR)
2nd place, silver medalist(s)	Yahia Abutabeekh (JOR)
3rd place, bronze medalist(s)	Janarbek Kenjeev (KGZ)
3rd place, bronze medalist(s)	Shingo Matsumoto (JPN)
5	Idrees Rahman (QAT)
5	Aleksandr Dokturishvili (UZB)
7	Salah Ghaliah (SYR)
8	Ma Sanyi (CHN)
9	Saman Tahmasebi (IRI)
10	Vitaliy Zakharchenko (KAZ)
11	Ahmad El-Habeche (LIB)
12	Saed Aburokba (PLE)
13	Manoj Kumar (IND)
