= Cycling at the 2008 Summer Olympics – Women's BMX =

Women's BMX at the Games of the XXIX Olympiad
- Olympic BMX racing
- Venue: Laoshan BMX Field
- Date: August 20, 2008 (seeding); August 22, 2008 (semifinals and final)
- Competitors: 16 from 13 nations
- Winning time: 35.976

Medalists
| 1st place, gold medalist(s) | | Anne-Caroline Chausson; France |
| 2nd place, silver medalist(s) | | Laëtitia Le Corguillé; France |
| 3rd place, bronze medalist(s) | | Jill Kintner; United States |

The women's BMX racing competition at the 2008 Summer Olympics took place on August 20–22 at the Laoshan BMX Field, the first to be officially featured in the Olympic cycling program.

Coming out of retirement from her sporting career to try out for BMX at age thirty, France's Anne-Caroline Chausson escaped from an early race crash that left two riders off the ramp to claim the event's inaugural Olympic gold medal. She thundered home on the final stretch to a spectacular finish with a fastest time in 35.976. Chausson also enjoyed her teammate Laëtitia Le Corguillé taking home the silver in 38.042, as she finished the race behind the leader by nearly seven hundredths of a second (0.07) and also, handed the French squad a straight 1–2 finish on the medal podium. Meanwhile, United States' Jill Kintner came up with a powerful, stalwart ride to earn the bronze in 38.674, edging out New Zealand's Sarah Walker by a short sprint distance.

== Qualification ==
Sixteen riders representing twelve countries qualified for the event. Qualification was based on UCI ranking by nations, 2008 UCI BMX World Championships results and wild-cards reserved to a Tripartite Commission (IOC, ANOC, UCI).

== Competition format ==
Each of the 16 women competing performed two runs of the course in individual time trials to determine seeding for the knockout rounds. Then, they were grouped into 2 semifinal groups based on that seeding. Each semifinal consisted of three runs of the course, using a point-for-place system. The top four cyclists in each semifinal (for a total of 8) moved on to the final. Unlike the semifinals, the final consisted of a single race with the first to the finish line claiming the gold medal.

== Schedule ==
All times are China Standard Time (UTC+8)

| Date | Time | Round |
|---|---|---|
| Wednesday, 20 August 2008 | 09:45 | Seeding |
| Friday, 20 August 2008 | 09:00 | Semifinals and final |

== Results ==
=== Seeding ===
| Rank | Name | Country | Time | Notes |
|---|---|---|---|---|
| 1 | Anne-Caroline Chausson | France | 36.660 | |
| 2 | Shanaze Reade | Great Britain | 36.882 | |
| 3 | Laëtitia Le Corguillé | France | 37.145 | |
| 4 | Sarah Walker | New Zealand | 37.187 | |
| 5 | Gabriela Díaz | Argentina | 37.590 | |
| 6 | Nicole Callisto | Australia | 37.717 | |
| 7 | Jill Kintner | United States | 37.913 | |
| 8 | Jana Horáková | Czech Republic | 38.077 | |
| 9 | Jenny Fähndrich | Switzerland | 38.209 | |
| 10 | Tanya Bailey | Australia | 38.285 | |
| 11 | Lieke Klaus | Netherlands | 38.709 | |
| 12 | Amanda Sørensen | Denmark | 38.719 | |
| 13 | Samantha Cools | Canada | 39.137 | |
| 14 | María Belén Dutto | Argentina | 40.193 | |
| 15 | Anikó Hódi | Hungary | 41.772 | |
| 16 | Ma Liyun | China | 42.015 | |

=== Semifinals ===
==== Heat 1 ====
| Rank | Name | Country | 1st run | 2nd run | 3rd run | Total | Notes |
|---|---|---|---|---|---|---|---|
| 1 | Anne-Caroline Chausson | France | 36.931 (1) | 37.028 (1) | 36.747 (2) | 4 | Q |
| 2 | Sarah Walker | New Zealand | 37.499 (2) | 39.038 (3) | 36.731 (1) | 6 | Q |
| 3 | Gabriela Díaz | Argentina | 37.605 (3) | 38.235 (2) | DNF (8) | 13 | Q |
| 4 | Samantha Cools | Canada | 39.765 (6) | 39.457 (5) | 38.690 (3) | 14 | Q |
| 5 | Jana Horáková | Czech Republic | 39.107 (5) | 39.457 (4) | 1:32.284 (7) | 16 | |
| 6 | Jenny Fähndrich | Switzerland | 38.658 (4) | 45.912 (7) | 52.687 (6) | 17 | |
| 7 | Ma Liyun | China | 41.789 (7) | 41.497 (6) | 41.839 (5) | 18 | |
| 8 | Amanda Sørensen | Denmark | DNF (8) | 47.469 (8) | 39.474 (4) | 20 | |

==== Heat 2 ====
| Rank | Name | Country | 1st run | 2nd run | 3rd run | Total | Notes |
|---|---|---|---|---|---|---|---|
| 1 | Laëtitia Le Corguillé | France | 37.917 (1) | 37.130 (1) | 37.076 (2) | 4 | Q |
| 2 | Jill Kintner | United States | 38.950 (3) | 39.700 (3) | 38.235 (3) | 9 | Q |
| 3 | Shanaze Reade | Great Britain | 2:17.714 (7) | 39.218 (2) | 36.699 (1) | 10 | Q |
| 4 | Nicole Callisto | Australia | 38.244 (2) | 47.311 (6) | 38.435 (4) | 12 | Q |
| 5 | Lieke Klaus | Netherlands | 40.955 (4) | 40.143 (4) | 38.800 (5) | 13 | |
| 6 | Anikó Hódi | Hungary | 44.021 (6) | 41.867 (5) | 40.169 (7) | 18 | |
| 7 | María Belén Dutto | Argentina | 41.307 (5) | 47.927 (7) | 40.295 (8) | 20 | |
| 8 | Tanya Bailey | Australia | DNF (8) | DNF (8) | 39.505 (6) | 22 | |

=== Final ===
| Rank | Name | Country | Time | Notes |
|---|---|---|---|---|
| 1st place, gold medalist(s) | Anne-Caroline Chausson | France | 35.976 | |
| 2nd place, silver medalist(s) | Laëtitia Le Corguillé | France | 38.042 | |
| 3rd place, bronze medalist(s) | Jill Kintner | United States | 38.674 | |
| 4 | Sarah Walker | New Zealand | 38.805 | |
| 5 | Gabriela Díaz | Argentina | 39.747 | |
| 6 | Nicole Callisto | Australia | 1:19.609 | |
| 7 | Samantha Cools | Canada | DNF | |
| 8 | Shanaze Reade | Great Britain | DNF | |
