= 2009 World Wrestling Championships – Men's Greco-Roman 84 kg =

Men's Greco-Roman 84 kg at the 2009 World Championships
- Venue: Messecenter Herning
- Dates: 26 September 2009
- Competitors: 33 from 33 nations

Medalists
gold medal	Nazmi Avluca	Turkey
silver medal	Mélonin Noumonvi	France
bronze medal	Habibollah Akhlaghi	Iran
bronze medal	Pablo Shorey	Cuba

The men's Greco-Roman 84 kilograms is a competition featured at the 2009 World Wrestling Championships, and was held at the Messecenter Herning exhibition center in Herning, Denmark on September 26.

== Results ==
Legend

- F — Won by fall

=== Finals ===
Semifinals			Final
Mélonin Noumonvi (FRA)	2	3
Habibollah Akhlaghi (IRI)	0	0	Mélonin Noumonvi (FRA)	0	0
Nazmi Avluca (TUR)	2	1	Nazmi Avluca (TUR)	1	3
Shalva Gadabadze (AZE)	0	0

=== Top half ===
==== Section 1 ====
Round of 64

Round of 32
Badri Khasaia (GEO)	0	2	1
Hristo Marinov (BUL)	1	0	0
Bentsion Khundiashvili (ISR)	0	0
Amer Hrustanović (AUT)	1	3
Yerbol Raimbekov (KAZ)	0	0
Mélonin Noumonvi (FRA)	1	3
Jan Fischer (GER)	0	0
Bolat Abdullaev (UKR)	1	2

Round of 16
Badri Khasaia (GEO)	3	1
Amer Hrustanović (AUT)	0	0
Mélonin Noumonvi (FRA)	1	3
Bolat Abdullaev (UKR)	0	0

Quarterfinals
Badri Khasaia (GEO)	0	0
Mélonin Noumonvi (FRA)	1	2

==== Section 2 ====
Round of 64

Round of 32
Habibollah Akhlaghi (IRI)	0	1	1
Aleksey Mishin (RUS)	1	0	0
Ardo Arusaar (EST)	1	1
Yorgen Cova (VEN)	0	0
Artur Shahinyan (ARM)	0	2	0
Nenad Žugaj (CRO)	1	0	3
Antti Hakala (FIN)	2	4
Chas Betts (USA)	0	0

Round of 16
Habibollah Akhlaghi (IRI)	1	3
Ardo Arusaar (EST)	0	0
Nenad Žugaj (CRO)	1	1	1
Antti Hakala (FIN)	3	1	0

Quarterfinals
Habibollah Akhlaghi (IRI)	4	2
Nenad Žugaj (CRO)	0	1

=== Bottom half ===
==== Section 3 ====
Round of 64

Round of 32
Adrian Mocanu (MDA)	2	0	0
Cho Hyo-chul (KOR)	2	1	1
Sherzod Urguchev (UZB)	0	1	0
Rune Nilsson (DEN)	1	0	2
Vojtěch Kukla (CZE)	0	0
Zoltán Fodor (HUN)	1	1
Pablo Shorey (CUB)	0	0
Nazmi Avluca (TUR)	1	2

Round of 16
Cho Hyo-chul (KOR)	2	7
Rune Nilsson (DEN)	0	0
Zoltán Fodor (HUN)	0	0
Nazmi Avluca (TUR)	1	2

Quarterfinals
Cho Hyo-chul (KOR)	0	0
Nazmi Avluca (TUR)	1	5^{F}

==== Section 4 ====
Round of 64
Norikatsu Saikawa (JPN)	0	0
Damian Janikowski (POL)	1	2

Round of 32
José Antonio Arias (DOM)	2	1
Lin Ming-hsuan (TPE)	1	0
Vladislavas Lukaševičius (LTU)	2	4
Pedro García (ESP)	0	0
Marián Mihálik (SVK)	0	0
Shalva Gadabadze (AZE)	3	2
Fisnik Zahiti (SWE)	3	1	0
Damian Janikowski (POL)	3	0	3

Round of 16
José Antonio Arias (DOM)	5	2	3^{F}
Vladislavas Lukaševičius (LTU)	1	2	0
Shalva Gadabadze (AZE)	5	1
Damian Janikowski (POL)	1	0

Quarterfinals
José Antonio Arias (DOM)	0
Shalva Gadabadze (AZE)	3^{F}

=== Repechage ===
Repechage round 2
Yerbol Raimbekov (KAZ)	1	1	0
Bolat Abdullaev (UKR)	3	0	1
Pablo Shorey (CUB)	3	2
Zoltán Fodor (HUN)	0	0

Repechage round 3
Bolat Abdullaev (UKR)	0	0
Badri Khasaia (GEO)	4	3
Pablo Shorey (CUB)	1	1
Cho Hyo-chul (KOR)	0	0

Bronze medals
Badri Khasaia (GEO)	0	0
Habibollah Akhlaghi (IRI)	1	2
Pablo Shorey (CUB)	1	0	1
Shalva Gadabadze (AZE)	0	2	0
