= Wrestling at the 2008 Summer Olympics – Men's Greco-Roman 84 kg =

Men's Greco-Roman 84 kg at the Games of the XXIX Olympiad
- Venue: China Agricultural University Gymnasium
- Date: 14 August 2008
- Competitors: 20 from 20 nations

Medalists
1st place, gold medalist(s)		Andrea Minguzzi	Italy
2nd place, silver medalist(s)		Zoltán Fodor	Hungary
3rd place, bronze medalist(s)		Nazmi Avluca	Turkey
3rd place, bronze medalist(s)		not awarded	

Men's Greco-Roman 84 kilograms competition at the 2008 Summer Olympics in Beijing, China, was held on August 14 at the China Agricultural University Gymnasium. Italian wrestler Andrea Minguzzi won the gold medal in this event.

This Greco-Roman wrestling competition consists of a single-elimination tournament, with a repechage used to determine the winner of two bronze medals. The two finalists face off for gold and silver medals. Each wrestler who loses to one of the two finalists moves into the repechage, culminating in a pair of bronze medal matches featuring the semifinal losers each facing the remaining repechage opponent from their half of the bracket.

Each bout consists of up to three rounds, lasting two minutes apiece. The wrestler who scores more points in each round is the winner of that rounds; the bout ends when one wrestler has won two rounds (and thus the match).

== Schedule ==
All times are China Standard Time (UTC+08:00)

Date	Time	Event
14 August 2008	09:30	Qualification rounds
14 August 2008	16:00	Repechage
14 August 2008	17:00	Finals

== Results ==
=== Final ===
Final
Zoltán Fodor (HUN)	1	1	0
Andrea Minguzzi (ITA)	1	1	4

=== Top half ===
Qualifications

1/8 finals
Oleksandr Daragan (UKR)	0	2	0
Saman Tahmasebi (IRI)	4	1	3
Nazmi Avluca (TUR)	4	1
Badri Khasaia (GEO)	0	1
Shalva Gadabadze (AZE)	5	5
Haykel Achouri (TUN)	0	0
Ma Sanyi (CHN)	0	1
Zoltán Fodor (HUN)	2	2

Quarterfinals
Saman Tahmasebi (IRI)	2	0
Nazmi Avluca (TUR)	2	3
Shalva Gadabadze (AZE)	1	0	1
Zoltán Fodor (HUN)	1	3	1

Semifinals
Nazmi Avluca (TUR)	1	1
Zoltán Fodor (HUN)	2	1

=== Bottom half ===
Qualifications
Shingo Matsumoto (JPN)	2	0
Denis Forov (ARM)	4	6
Brad Vering (USA)	4	1
Artur Michalkiewicz (POL)	0	1
Ara Abrahamian (SWE)	1	1	1
Kim Jung-sub (KOR)	3	1	1
Attila Bátky (SVK)	0	0
Yunior Estrada (CUB)	4	5

1/8 finals
Mélonin Noumonvi (FRA)	1	1
Andrea Minguzzi (ITA)	1	1
Andrey Samokhin (KAZ)	1	0
Aleksey Mishin (RUS)	2	3
Denis Forov (ARM)	4	1	3
Brad Vering (USA)	0	2	0
Ara Abrahamian (SWE)	2	1	1
Yunior Estrada (CUB)	1	1	1

Quarterfinals
Andrea Minguzzi (ITA)	1	0	2
Aleksey Mishin (RUS)	1	3	1
Denis Forov (ARM)	1	3	1
Ara Abrahamian (SWE)	1	0	2

Semifinals
Andrea Minguzzi (ITA)	1	2
Ara Abrahamian (SWE)	1	1

=== Repechage ===
Repechage round 2
Ma Sanyi (CHN)	3	3
Shalva Gadabadze (AZE)	3	2
Mélonin Noumonvi (FRA)	0	1	1
Aleksey Mishin (RUS)	3	1	1

Bronze medals
Ma Sanyi (CHN)	4	0	0
Nazmi Avluca (TUR)	0	5	6
Mélonin Noumonvi (FRA)	0	1
Ara Abrahamian (SWE)	4	1

== Final standing ==
Rank	Athlete
1st place, gold medalist(s)	Andrea Minguzzi (ITA)
2nd place, silver medalist(s)	Zoltán Fodor (HUN)
3rd place, bronze medalist(s)	Nazmi Avluca (TUR)
3rd place, bronze medalist(s)	None awarded
5	Ma Sanyi (CHN)
5	Mélonin Noumonvi (FRA)
7	Denis Forov (ARM)
8	Shalva Gadabadze (AZE)
9	Aleksey Mishin (RUS)
10	Yunior Estrada (CUB)
11	Saman Tahmasebi (IRI)
12	Brad Vering (USA)
13	Kim Jung-sub (KOR)
14	Oleksandr Daragan (UKR)
15	Shingo Matsumoto (JPN)
16	Badri Khasaia (GEO)
16	Artur Michalkiewicz (POL)
16	Andrey Samokhin (KAZ)
19	Attila Bátky (SVK)
20	Haykel Achouri (TUN)
DQ	Ara Abrahamian (SWE)

- Ara Abrahamian of Sweden originally won a bronze medal, but he was disqualified after he walked off the podium and placed his medal onto the mat at the medal ceremony to protest the judging in his semi-final match. The IOC decided not to re-allocate the medal, as Abrahamian's offence did not occur in the context of the competition.

== Controversy ==
Pelle Svensson, a former two-time world champion in Greco-Roman and member of board of FILA from 1990 to 2007, spoke out in support of the allegations of corruption during the semifinals in the men's Greco-Roman wrestling 84 kg at the 2008 Summer Olympics in Beijing, when Ara Abrahamian lost against Andrea Minguzzi from Italy after a controversial ruling by the referee. It was later reported that the referee of the match, Jean-Marc Petoud from Switzerland, is a first cousin of the current President of FILA Raphaël Martinetti.

Abrahamian of Sweden originally won a bronze medal after winning his next bout, but he was disqualified after he walked off the podium and placed his medal onto the mat at the medal ceremony to protest the judging in his semifinal match. The IOC decided not to re-allocate the medal, as Abrahamian's offence did not occur in the context of the competition.

Abrahamian later filed a case in the Court of Arbitration for Sport (CAS) against the referee's ruling during his bout with Minguzzi, where a penalty wasn't assessed until after the round had concluded. Abrahamian's coach was denied a chance to review the call via video, and FILA also refused an official protest from the coach. Minguzzi later took gold in the event.

French wrestler Mélonin Noumonvi, who lost to Abrahamian in one of the bronze medal bouts, was a prospective recipient of the stripped bronze medal. But the IOC decided not to award the medal because Abrahamian's disqualification did not happen in the context of the competition.
