= Fähndrich =

Fähndrich is a surname. Notable people with the surname include:

- Hartmut Fähndrich (born 1944), German scholar and translator
- Hugo Fähndrich (1851–1930), Austrian–Hungarian chess master
- Jenny Fähndrich (born 1989), Swiss BMX cyclist
- Markus Fähndrich (born 1960), Swiss skier
- Nadine Fähndrich (born 1995), Swiss skier

== See also ==
- Musée Chappuis-Fähndrich, museum in Develier, Canton of Jura, Switzerland
