= Tanya Bailey =

Australian BMX rider (born 1981)

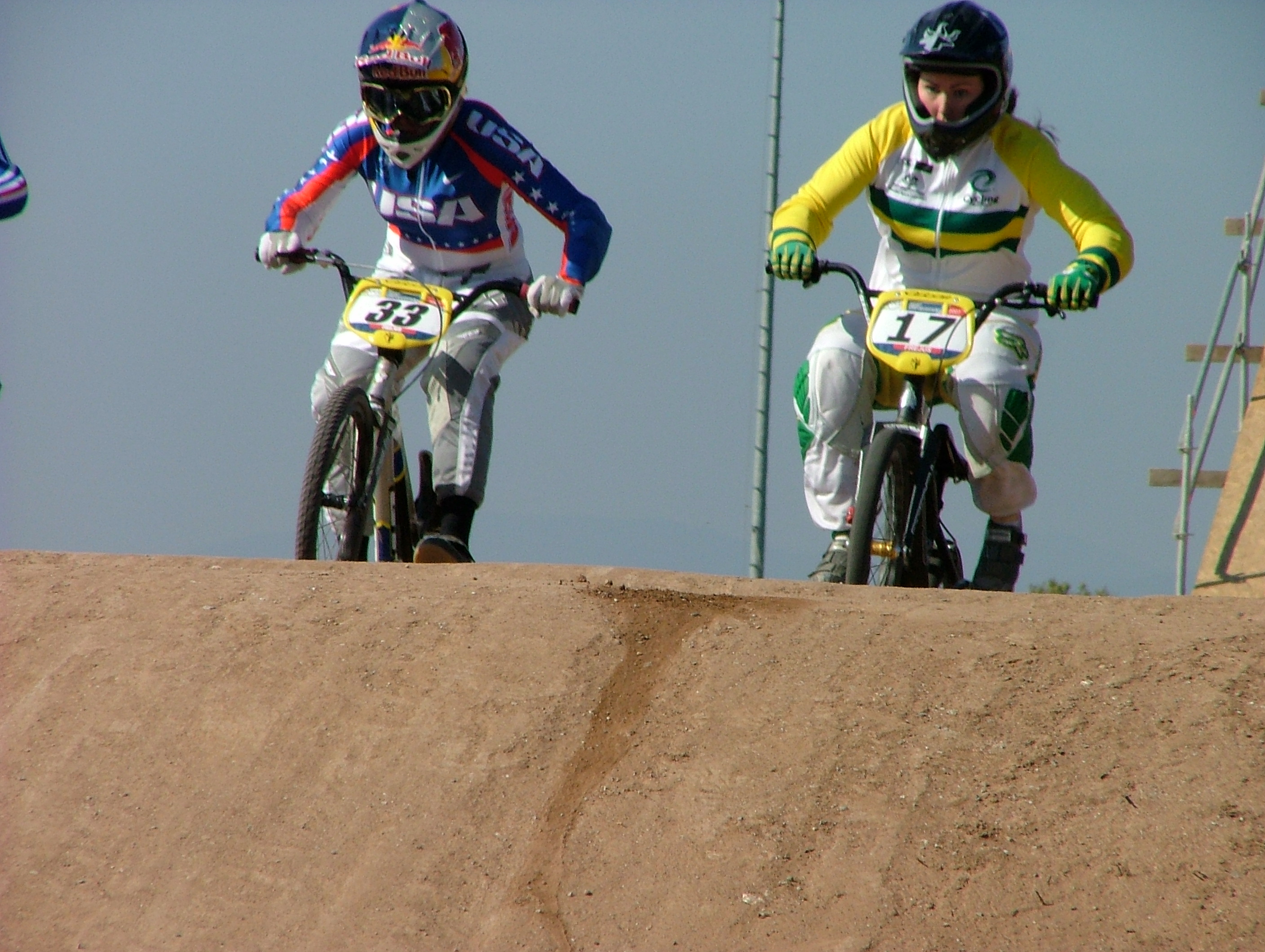
- Tanya Bailey (right)

Personal information
- Full name: Tanya Bailey
- Born: 15 March 1981 (age 45) Dampier, Western Australia, Australia
- Height: 1.65 m (5 ft 5 in)
- Weight: 66 kg (146 lb)

Cycling career
- Sport: Cycling
- Current team: Wanneroo BMX Club
- Discipline: Bicycle motocross (BMX)
- Role: Rider
- Rider type: Off-road

Tanya Bailey (born 15 March 1981, in Dampier, Western Australia) is an Australian amateur BMX cyclist. Bailey has been a part of the national BMX cycling team for more than 10 years but granted her first and only opportunity to represent her nation, Australia, at the 2008 Summer Olympics, where she became a semifinalist in the women's elite category. In that same year, Bailey has also achieved ample success in the sport, finishing second at the Australian national championships and the Supercross World Cup, held in Adelaide. Throughout her sporting career, Bailey has been training with her personal and assistant national coach Wade Bootes for the Wanneroo BMX Club on the Gold Coast, Queensland.

Along with her teammate Nicole Callisto, Bailey qualified for the Australian squad in women's BMX cycling at the 2008 Summer Olympics in Beijing by receiving one of the nation's two available berths from the Union Cycliste Internationale, based on her best performance at the UCI World Championships in Taiyuan, China. Although she was ranked no. 9 in the UCI rankings for female BMX cyclists and grabbed a tenth seed on the morning prelims with a time of 38.285, Bailey could not match a stellar ride in her semifinal heat with two unfulfilled attempts, a total of 22 positioning points, and an eighth-place finish, thus eliminating her from the tournament.
