= 2005 World Wrestling Championships – Women's freestyle 51 kg =

Women's freestyle 51 kg at the 2005 World Championships
- Venue: László Papp Budapest Sports Arena
- Dates: 28 September 2005
- Competitors: 22 from 22 nations

Medalists
gold medal	Hitomi Sakamoto	Japan
silver medal	Vanessa Boubryemm	France
bronze medal	Tsogtbazaryn Enkhjargal	Mongolia
bronze medal	Wen Juling	China

The women's freestyle 51 kilograms is a competition featured at the 2005 World Wrestling Championships, and was held at the László Papp Budapest Sports Arena in Budapest, Hungary on 28 September 2005.

This freestyle wrestling competition consists of a single-elimination tournament, with a repechage used to determine the winner of two bronze medals.

== Results ==
Legend

- F — Won by fall

=== Final ===
Final
Vanessa Boubryemm (FRA)	0
Hitomi Sakamoto (JPN)	4^{F}

=== Top half ===
Round of 32

Round of 16
Poonam Sharma (IND)	0
Natalia Smirnova (RUS)	4^{F}
Tsogtbazaryn Enkhjargal (MGL)	2	3
Alena Kareisha (BLR)	0	1
Valentina Minguzzi (ITA)	0	1
Oleksandra Kohut (UKR)	1	3
Nadine Tokar (SUI)	0	0
Vanessa Boubryemm (FRA)	4	4

Quarterfinals
Natalia Smirnova (RUS)	0	1	0
Tsogtbazaryn Enkhjargal (MGL)	1	0	1
Oleksandra Kohut (UKR)	2	1	0
Vanessa Boubryemm (FRA)	2	7	6

Semifinals
Tsogtbazaryn Enkhjargal (MGL)	0
Vanessa Boubryemm (FRA)	6^{F}

=== Bottom half ===
Round of 32
Brigitte Wagner (GER)	1	1	2
Dinara Mirzaeva (UZB)	0	2	3
Hitomi Sakamoto (JPN)	5^{F}
Livanis Rivera (PUR)	0
Emese Szabó (HUN)	0	0
Stephanie Murata (USA)	4	3
Nurzat Shailobaeva (KGZ)	4	1	4
Katerina Poumpouridou (GRE)	3	1	3
Zeynep Yıldırım (TUR)	1	1
Joanna Mills (GBR)	0	0
Erica Sharp (CAN)	2	5
Jenny Mallqui (PER)	1	0

Round of 16
Wen Juling (CHN)	8	9
Estera Dobre (ROM)	4	2
Dinara Mirzaeva (UZB)	0	0
Hitomi Sakamoto (JPN)	6	4^{F}
Stephanie Murata (USA)	4^{F}
Nurzat Shailobaeva (KGZ)	0
Zeynep Yıldırım (TUR)	0	2
Erica Sharp (CAN)	5	4^{F}

Quarterfinals
Wen Juling (CHN)	0	1
Hitomi Sakamoto (JPN)	2	4
Stephanie Murata (USA)	1	0	0
Erica Sharp (CAN)	0	6	4

Semifinals
Hitomi Sakamoto (JPN)	3	6
Erica Sharp (CAN)	0	0

=== Repechage ===
Repechage round 1
Livanis Rivera (PUR)	2	1
Dinara Mirzaeva (UZB)	2	8

Repechage round 2
Nadine Tokar (SUI)	0
Oleksandra Kohut (UKR)	8^{F}
Dinara Mirzaeva (UZB)	0	1
Wen Juling (CHN)	7	3

Bronze medals
Oleksandra Kohut (UKR)	1	2
Tsogtbazaryn Enkhjargal (MGL)	2	3^{F}
Wen Juling (CHN)	7	6
Erica Sharp (CAN)	0	0
