= Lee Se-yeol =

South Korean Greco-Roman wrestler

Lee Se-Yeol
Personal information
- Nationality: South Korea
- Born: 15 October 1990 (age 35) Jeollanam-do, South Korea
- Height: 1.80 m (5 ft 11 in)
- Weight: 84 kg (185 lb)

Sport
- Sport: Wrestling
- Event: Greco-Roman
- Club: Korea Minting and Security; Printing Corporation
- Coached by: Kim Jin Kyu
Medal record
Men's Greco-Roman wrestling
Representing South Korea
Asian Games
Silver medal – second place	2010 Guangzhou	84 kg
Asian Championships
Gold medal – first place	2010 Delhi	84 kg

Lee Se-Yeol (Korean: 이세열; born October 15, 1990, in Jeollanam-do) is an amateur South Korean Greco-Roman wrestler, who played for the men's light heavyweight category. In 2010, Lee defeated Japan's Norikatsu Saikawa for the gold medal in his respective division at the Asian Wrestling Championships in Delhi, India, and eventually captured a silver at the Asian Games in Guangzhou, China, losing out to Iran's Taleb Nematpour.

Lee represented South Korea at the 2012 Summer Olympics in London, where he competed for the men's 84 kg class. He lost the qualifying round match to Bosnian-born Austrian wrestler Amer Hrustanović, who was able to score four points in two straight periods, leaving Lee without a single point.

He competed in the 97 kg event at the 2022 World Wrestling Championships held in Belgrade, Serbia.
