= Wrestling at the 2010 Asian Games – Men's Greco-Roman 84 kg =

Men's Greco-Roman 84 kg at the 2010 Asian Games
- Venue: Huagong Gymnasium
- Date: 22 November 2010
- Competitors: 14 from 14 nations

Medalists
gold medal	Taleb Nematpour	Iran
silver medal	Lee Se-yeol	South Korea
bronze medal	Alkhazur Ozdiyev	Kazakhstan
bronze medal	Janarbek Kenjeev	Kyrgyzstan

The men's Greco-Roman 84 kg wrestling competition at the 2010 Asian Games in Guangzhou was held on 22 November 2010 at the Huagong Gymnasium.

This Greco-Roman wrestling competition consisted of a single-elimination tournament, with a repechage used to determine the winner of two bronze medals. The two finalists faced off for gold and silver medals. Each wrestler who lost to one of the two finalists moved into the repechage, culminating in a pair of bronze medal matches featuring the semifinal losers each facing the remaining repechage opponent from their half of the bracket.

Each bout consisted of up to three rounds, lasting two minutes apiece. The wrestler who scored more points in each round was the winner of that rounds; the bout finished when one wrestler had won two rounds (and thus the match).

== Schedule ==
All times are China Standard Time (UTC+08:00)

Date	Time	Event
Monday, 22 November 2010	09:30	1/8 finals
Monday, 22 November 2010	09:30	Quarterfinals
Monday, 22 November 2010	09:30	Semifinals
Monday, 22 November 2010	16:00	Repechages
Monday, 22 November 2010	17:00	Finals

== Results ==
Legend

- F — Won by fall

=== Main bracket ===
1/8 finals
Alaa Abusnaina (PLE)	0	0
Jakhongir Muminov (UZB)	7	7^{F}
Ma Sanyi (CHN)	0	0
Lee Se-yeol (KOR)	1	2
Nezar Oudeh (SYR)	1	1
Ylýas Esenow (TKM)	0	0
Ali Awarke (LIB)	0	0
Manoj Kumar (IND)	1	1
Jafar Khan (QAT)	0	0
Taleb Nematpour (IRI)	1	1
Norikatsu Saikawa (JPN)	0	0
Janarbek Kenjeev (KGZ)	3	3

Quarterfinals
Alkhazur Ozdiyev (KAZ)	7	1
Noor Ahmad Ahmadi (AFG)	0	0
Jakhongir Muminov (UZB)	0	0
Lee Se-yeol (KOR)	2	2
Nezar Oudeh (SYR)	0	0
Manoj Kumar (IND)	1	1
Taleb Nematpour (IRI)	0	2	1
Janarbek Kenjeev (KGZ)	1	0	0

Semifinals
Alkhazur Ozdiyev (KAZ)	4	0	0
Lee Se-yeol (KOR)	0	2	1
Manoj Kumar (IND)	0	0
Taleb Nematpour (IRI)	1	1

Final
Lee Se-yeol (KOR)	0	0
Taleb Nematpour (IRI)	1	2

=== Repechage ===
Repechage round 1
Ma Sanyi (CHN)	2	1
Jakhongir Muminov (UZB)	0	0
Jafar Khan (QAT)	0	0
Janarbek Kenjeev (KGZ)	3	7

Bronze medals
Ma Sanyi (CHN)	2	0	0
Alkhazur Ozdiyev (KAZ)	0	2	2
Janarbek Kenjeev (KGZ)	2	1
Manoj Kumar (IND)	0	0

== Final standing ==
Rank	Athlete
1st place, gold medalist(s)	Taleb Nematpour (IRI)
2nd place, silver medalist(s)	Lee Se-yeol (KOR)
3rd place, bronze medalist(s)	Alkhazur Ozdiyev (KAZ)
3rd place, bronze medalist(s)	Janarbek Kenjeev (KGZ)
5	Ma Sanyi (CHN)
5	Manoj Kumar (IND)
7	Nezar Oudeh (SYR)
8	Ali Awarke (LIB)
8	Ylýas Esenow (TKM)
10	Norikatsu Saikawa (JPN)
11	Noor Ahmad Ahmadi (AFG)
12	Jafar Khan (QAT)
13	Alaa Abusnaina (PLE)
DQ	Jakhongir Muminov (UZB)

- Jakhongir Muminov of Uzbekistan originally got the 7th place, but was disqualified after he tested positive for Methylhexanamine.
