= 2013 World Wrestling Championships – Men's Greco-Roman 84 kg =

Men's wrestling tournament

Men's Greco-Roman 84 kg at the 2013 World Championships
- Venue: László Papp Budapest Sports Arena
- Dates: 21 September 2013
- Competitors: 35 from 35 nations

Medalists
gold medal	Taleb Nematpour	Iran
silver medal	Saman Tahmasebi	Azerbaijan
bronze medal	Javid Hamzatau	Belarus
bronze medal	Viktor Lőrincz	Hungary

The men's Greco-Roman 84 kilograms is a competition featured at the 2013 World Wrestling Championships, and was held at the László Papp Budapest Sports Arena in Budapest, Hungary on 21 September 2013.

== Results ==
Legend

- C — Won by 3 cautions given to the opponent
- F — Won by fall

=== Finals ===
Semifinals		Final
Damian Janikowski (POL)	2
Taleb Nematpour (IRI)	5	Taleb Nematpour (IRI)	5
Saman Tahmasebi (AZE)	6	Saman Tahmasebi (AZE)	3
Rami Hietaniemi (FIN)	2

=== Top half ===
==== Section 1 ====
Round of 64

Round of 32
Dorin Pârvan (ROU)	2
Azat Beishebekov (KGZ)	0
Maksim Manukyan (ARM)	9
Tarek Abdelsalam (EGY)	0
Harpreet Singh Sandhu (IND)	0
Eerik Aps (EST)	6
Ilias Boukis (GRE)	0
Damian Janikowski (POL)	5^{F}

Round of 16
Dorin Pârvan (ROU)	0
Maksim Manukyan (ARM)	10^{F}
Eerik Aps (EST)	0
Damian Janikowski (POL)	7

Quarterfinals
Maksim Manukyan (ARM)	2
Damian Janikowski (POL)	7

==== Section 2 ====
Round of 64

Round of 32
Alexander Brazón (VEN)	0
Taleb Nematpour (IRI)	8
Laimutis Adomaitis (LTU)	3
Javid Hamzatau (BLR)	4
Nursultan Tursynov (KAZ)	5
Artur Omarov (CZE)	3
Selçuk Çebi (TUR)	2
Peng Fei (CHN)	4

Round of 16
Taleb Nematpour (IRI)	6^{C}
Javid Hamzatau (BLR)	0
Nursultan Tursynov (KAZ)	8
Peng Fei (CHN)	5

Quarterfinals
Taleb Nematpour (IRI)	8
Nursultan Tursynov (KAZ)	0

=== Bottom half ===
==== Section 3 ====
Round of 64

Round of 32
Rustam Assakalov (UZB)	4^{F}
Hristo Marinov (BUL)	0
Giorgi Tsirekidze (GEO)	1
Vasyl Rachyba (UKR)	1
Viktor Lőrincz (HUN)	7
Hanssel Mejía (MEX)	0
Saman Tahmasebi (AZE)	4
Eugen Ponomartschuk (GER)	0

Round of 16
Rustam Assakalov (UZB)	2
Giorgi Tsirekidze (GEO)	3
Viktor Lőrincz (HUN)	0
Saman Tahmasebi (AZE)	5

Quarterfinals
Giorgi Tsirekidze (GEO)	0
Saman Tahmasebi (AZE)	7

==== Section 4 ====
Round of 64
Taichi Oka (JPN)	3
Jure Kuhar (SLO)	0
Nenad Žugaj (CRO)	7
Michael Wagner (AUT)	0
Gilberto Piquet (CUB)	0
Aleksey Mishin (RUS)	7

Round of 32
Jordan Holm (USA)	4
Pedro García (ESP)	1
Óscar Martínez (HON)	0
Rami Hietaniemi (FIN)	7
Fisnik Zahiti (SWE)	1
Taichi Oka (JPN)	0
Nenad Žugaj (CRO)	3^{C}
Aleksey Mishin (RUS)	0

Round of 16
Jordan Holm (USA)	0
Rami Hietaniemi (FIN)	8
Fisnik Zahiti (SWE)	0
Nenad Žugaj (CRO)	6^{C}

Quarterfinals
Rami Hietaniemi (FIN)	3
Nenad Žugaj (CRO)	2

=== Repechage ===
Repechage round 2
Alexander Brazón (VEN)	0
Javid Hamzatau (BLR)	2^{C}
Eugen Ponomartschuk (GER)	0
Viktor Lőrincz (HUN)	3

Repechage round 3
Javid Hamzatau (BLR)	7
Nursultan Tursynov (KAZ)	0
Viktor Lőrincz (HUN)	7
Giorgi Tsirekidze (GEO)	0

Bronze medals
Javid Hamzatau (BLR)	2
Damian Janikowski (POL)	2
Viktor Lőrincz (HUN)	2
Rami Hietaniemi (FIN)	0
