= Samantha Cools =

Canadian Bicycle Motocross racer

Personal information
- Nickname: "Sammy"
- Born: March 3, 1986 (age 40) Calgary, Alberta, Canada
- Height: 1.60 m (5 ft 3 in)
- Weight: 60 kg (130 lb)

Cycling career
- Sport: Cycling
- Discipline: BMX (bicycle motocross)
- Role: Racer
- Rider type: Off Road

Amateur teams
- 1996–?: Staats Bicycles
- ?–2004: Supercross BMX

Professional teams
- 2005–?: Supercross BMX
- –: Airdrie BMX
- –: CCA National Team

Samantha "Sammy" Cools (born March 3, 1986) is a Canadian BMX (bicycle motocross) racer. Born in Calgary, Alberta, she was introduced to the sport by her brothers Ken Cools, coach of the New Zealand BMX team, and Greg. She currently lives in Ganddal, Norway.

Winning her very first race at three years of age and her first international race at age 10, she is now a 13-time Canadian national champion and five-time world junior champion. She was coached by Hervé Krebs. At the 2008 UCI BMX World Championships she finished fifth in the elite women event.

Cools competed at the 2008 Summer Olympics in the women's BMX. She qualified for the final in the event, but crashed after colliding midair with Gabriela Diaz seconds into the race. Although she did cross the finish line, she was officially classified as "Did not finish" and was ranked seventh.
