= Habibollah Akhlaghi =

Iranian wrestler (born 1985)

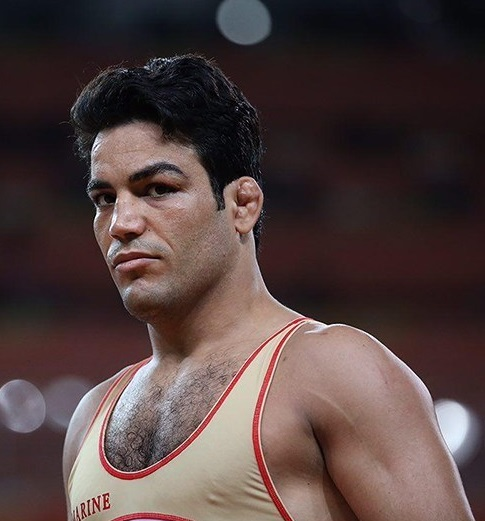
Medal record
Representing Iran
Men's Greco-Roman wrestling
World Championships
Bronze medal – third place	2009 Herning	84 kg
Bronze medal – third place	2015 Las Vegas	85 kg
Asian Games
Gold medal – first place	2014 Incheon	80 kg
Asian Championships
Gold medal – first place	2012 Gumi	84 kg

Habibollah Akhlaghi (Persian: حبیب‌الله اخلاقی, born August 3, 1985, in Andimeshk) is an Iranian wrestler. He is Ph.D. student of Sports Management in Shahid Chamran University of Ahvaz.
