= Amanda Sørensen =

Danish cyclist

Personal information
- Full name: Amanda Sørensen
- Born: 18 November 1985 (age 40) Skanderborg, Denmark
- Height: 1.74 m (5 ft 9 in)
- Weight: 68 kg (150 lb)

Cycling career
- Sport: Cycling
- Current team: Retired
- Discipline: Bicycle motocross (BMX)
- Role: Rider
- Rider type: Off road

Amateur team
- 2002–2009: Skanderborg BMX Klub

Amanda Sørensen (born 18 November 1985) is a Danish retired amateur BMX cyclist. Having started her sporting career at the age of seven and been admitted to the Danish national cycling team since 2002, Sorensen has mounted numerous Nordic regional titles and top-eight finishes in BMX racing at the European Championships, and admittedly, participated in more than 300 BMX circuits across Australia, the United States, Brazil, and Europe. Before retiring from the sport in September 2009, Sorensen also represented her nation Denmark at the 2008 Summer Olympics, and has been training with personal and head coach Christian Munk Poulsen for Skanderborg BMX Klub throughout her cycling career.

Sorensen qualified for the Danish squad in women's BMX cycling at the 2008 Summer Olympics in Beijing by receiving an invitational berth from the Union Cycliste Internationale (UCI) based on her best performance at the UCI World Championships in Victoria, British Columbia, Canada. After she grabbed a twelfth seed on the morning prelims with a time of 38.719, Sorensen crashed her bike down the field once and scored a total of 20 placing points to mount an eighth spot in the semifinals, thus eliminating her from the tournament.
