= 2005 Asian Wrestling Championships =

- Host city: Wuhan, China
- Dates: 24–29 May 2005

Champions
- Freestyle: Iran
- Greco-Roman: South Korea
- Women: Japan

The 2005 Asian Wrestling Championships were held in Wuhan, China. The event took place from May 24 to May 29, 2005.

== Medal table ==
Rank	Nation	Gold	Silver	Bronze	Total
1	China	4	3	4	11
2	Iran	4	2	4	10
3	South Korea	4	1	4	9
4	Japan	3	6	6	15
5	Kazakhstan	3	2	4	9
6	Uzbekistan	1	2	2	5
7	North Korea	1	2	1	4
8	Kyrgyzstan	1	1	4	6
9	India	0	2	5	7
10	Mongolia	0	0	6	6
11	Iraq	0	0	1	1
11	Vietnam	0	0	1	1
Totals (12 entries)		21	21	42	84

== Team ranking ==
Rank	Men's freestyle		Men's Greco-Roman		Women's freestyle	
Rank	Team	Points	Team	Points	Team	Points
1	Iran	64	South Korea	55	Japan	61
2	Japan	49	Kazakhstan	51	China	61
3	South Korea	41	Japan	51	Mongolia	48
4	India	39	China	44	South Korea	45
5	Kazakhstan	38	Kyrgyzstan	42	India	42
6	Uzbekistan	35	Iran	40	Vietnam	29
7	Mongolia	33	India	37	Kazakhstan	22
8	China	32	Iraq	26	Chinese Taipei	22
9	North Korea	24	North Korea	24	Kyrgyzstan	20
10	Kyrgyzstan	14	Uzbekistan	13	Uzbekistan	15

== Medal summary ==
=== Men's freestyle ===
Event	Gold	Silver	Bronze
55 kg	Dilshod Mansurov; Uzbekistan	Jon Hyon-guk; North Korea	Taghi Dadashi; Iran
55 kg	Dilshod Mansurov; Uzbekistan	Jon Hyon-guk; North Korea	Tomohiro Matsunaga; Japan
60 kg	Morad Mohammadi; Iran	Ri Yong-chol; North Korea	Takafumi Kojima; Japan
60 kg	Morad Mohammadi; Iran	Ri Yong-chol; North Korea	Damir Zakhartdinov; Uzbekistan
66 kg	Baek Jin-kuk; South Korea	Hamid Mohammadnejad; Iran	Polat Urazimbetov; Uzbekistan
66 kg	Baek Jin-kuk; South Korea	Hamid Mohammadnejad; Iran	Kazuhiko Ikematsu; Japan
74 kg	Siriguleng; China	Soslan Tigiev; Uzbekistan	Hadi Habibi; Iran
74 kg	Siriguleng; China	Soslan Tigiev; Uzbekistan	Ramesh Kumar; India
84 kg	Saeid Ebrahimi; Iran	Takao Isokawa; Japan	Ruslan Sumenkov; Kyrgyzstan
84 kg	Saeid Ebrahimi; Iran	Takao Isokawa; Japan	Anuj Chaudhary; India
96 kg	Hamid Seifi; Iran	Nurzhan Katayev; Kazakhstan	Koo Tae-hyun; South Korea
96 kg	Hamid Seifi; Iran	Nurzhan Katayev; Kazakhstan	Boldyn Sainbayar; Mongolia
120 kg	Marid Mutalimov; Kazakhstan	Alireza Rezaei; Iran	Liang Lei; China
120 kg	Marid Mutalimov; Kazakhstan	Alireza Rezaei; Iran	Palwinder Singh Cheema; India

=== Men's Greco-Roman ===
Event	Gold	Silver	Bronze
55 kg	Cha Kwang-su; North Korea	Im Dae-won; South Korea	Mukesh Khatri; India
55 kg	Cha Kwang-su; North Korea	Im Dae-won; South Korea	Shingo Hirai; Japan
60 kg	Ali Ashkani; Iran	Rinat Usupjanov; Kyrgyzstan	Nurbakyt Tengizbayev; Kazakhstan
60 kg	Ali Ashkani; Iran	Rinat Usupjanov; Kyrgyzstan	Makoto Sasamoto; Japan
66 kg	Jung Tae-kyun; South Korea	Masaki Imuro; Japan	Li Yanyan; China
66 kg	Jung Tae-kyun; South Korea	Masaki Imuro; Japan	Kim Kum-chol; North Korea
74 kg	Daniar Kobonov; Kyrgyzstan	Bakhtiyar Baiseitov; Kazakhstan	Choi Duk-hoon; South Korea
74 kg	Daniar Kobonov; Kyrgyzstan	Bakhtiyar Baiseitov; Kazakhstan	Tsukasa Tsurumaki; Japan
84 kg	Kim Jung-sub; South Korea	Shingo Matsumoto; Japan	Janarbek Kenjeev; Kyrgyzstan
84 kg	Kim Jung-sub; South Korea	Shingo Matsumoto; Japan	Vitaliy Zakharchenko; Kazakhstan
96 kg	Margulan Assembekov; Kazakhstan	Chen Xiaofei; China	Masoud Hashemzadeh; Iran
96 kg	Margulan Assembekov; Kazakhstan	Chen Xiaofei; China	Azamat Erkimbaev; Kyrgyzstan
120 kg	Georgiy Tsurtsumia; Kazakhstan	Liu Deli; China	Sajjad Barzi; Iran
120 kg	Georgiy Tsurtsumia; Kazakhstan	Liu Deli; China	Jasim Breesam; Iraq

=== Women's freestyle ===
Event	Gold	Silver	Bronze
48 kg	Ren Xuecheng; China	Makiko Sakamoto; Japan	Bekzat Mustafina; Kazakhstan
48 kg	Ren Xuecheng; China	Makiko Sakamoto; Japan	Dashdavaagiin Baasanjargal; Mongolia
51 kg	Hitomi Sakamoto; Japan	Dinara Mirzaeva; Uzbekistan	Meena; India
51 kg	Hitomi Sakamoto; Japan	Dinara Mirzaeva; Uzbekistan	Tsogtbazaryn Enkhjargal; Mongolia
55 kg	Saori Yoshida; Japan	Su Lihui; China	Lee Na-lae; South Korea
55 kg	Saori Yoshida; Japan	Su Lihui; China	Nghiêm Thị Giang; Vietnam
59 kg	Kim Hee-jeong; South Korea	Alka Tomar; India	Mao Xinling; China
59 kg	Kim Hee-jeong; South Korea	Alka Tomar; India	Dorjiin Narmandakh; Mongolia
63 kg	Kaori Icho; Japan	Geetika Jakhar; India	Meng Lili; China
63 kg	Kaori Icho; Japan	Geetika Jakhar; India	Hang Jin-young; South Korea
67 kg	Jing Ruixue; China	Eri Sakamoto; Japan	Yana Panova; Kyrgyzstan
67 kg	Jing Ruixue; China	Eri Sakamoto; Japan	Ochirbatyn Myagmarsüren; Mongolia
72 kg	Wang Jiao; China	Ayako Murashima; Japan	Ochirbatyn Burmaa; Mongolia
72 kg	Wang Jiao; China	Ayako Murashima; Japan	Olga Zhanibekova; Kazakhstan

== Participating nations ==
215 competitors from 19 nations competed.

- Cambodia (2)
- China (21)
- Chinese Taipei (11)
- India (21)
- Indonesia (6)
- Iran (14)
- Iraq (9)
- Japan (21)
- Kazakhstan (17)
- Kyrgyzstan (15)
- Mongolia (14)
- North Korea (8)
- Philippines (2)
- Qatar (5)
- South Korea (21)
- Thailand (2)
- United Arab Emirates (2)
- Uzbekistan (12)
- Vietnam (12)
