= Janarbek Kenjeev =

Kyrgyz Greco-Roman wrestler

Personal information
- Full name: Janarbek Kenjeev
- Nationality: Kyrgyzstan
- Born: 5 August 1985 (age 40) Talas, Kirghizia, Soviet Union
- Height: 1.80 m (5 ft 11 in)
- Weight: 84 kg (185 lb)

Sport
- Style: Greco-Roman
- Club: Sduschor 1
- Coach: Hakim Makhmudov
Medal record
Men's Greco-Roman wrestling
Representing Kyrgyzstan
Asian Games
Bronze medal – third place	2006 Doha	84 kg
Bronze medal – third place	2010 Guangzhou	84 kg
Asian Championships
Gold medal – first place	2014 Astana	80 kg
Silver medal – second place	2004 Almaty	84 kg
Bronze medal – third place	2005 Wuhan	84 kg
Bronze medal – third place	2007 Bishkek	84 kg
Bronze medal – third place	2010 New Delhi	84 kg

Janarbek Kenjeev (also Zhanarbek Kenzheyev, Russian: Жанарбек Кенжеев; born August 5, 1985, in Talas) is an amateur Kyrgyz Greco-Roman wrestler, who competed in the men's light heavyweight category. Considered one of Asia's top wrestlers in his decade, Kenjeev has collected a total of five medals at the Asian Championships, picked up two bronze in the 84-kg division at the Asian Games (2006 and 2010), and also represented his nation Kyrgyzstan, as a 19-year-old teen, at the 2004 Summer Olympics. Throughout his sporting career, Kenjeev trains for Sduschor 1 Wrestling Club in Bishkek, under his personal coach Hakim Makhmudov.

Kenjeev qualified for the Kyrgyz squad in the men's 84 kg class at the 2004 Summer Olympics by gaining an allocated bid and placing fourth from the Olympic Qualification Tournament in Novi Sad, Serbia and Montenegro. He lost three straight matches to Sweden's Ara Abrahamian, Japan's Shingo Matsumoto, and Slovakia's Attila Bátky in the four-man prelim pool, finishing thirteenth overall in the final standings.

At the 2006 Asian Games in Doha, Qatar, Kenjeev came strong in the same tournament, and proceeded to take home the bronze medal in a match against the host nation's Idrees Rahman with a 14–6 decision.

Kenjeev also sought his bid to compete for his second Olympics in Beijing and possibly London, but finished farther from the top spot twice in the Olympic Qualification Tournament. Despite a double Olympic setback, Kenjeev managed to collect another bronze medal in the 84-kg division at the 2010 Asian Games in Guangzhou, China, outclassing India's Manoj Kumar by a three-point advantage.

Ten years after competing in his first Olympics, Kenjeev reached the peak of his sporting career as he defeated Iranian wrestler Yousef Ghaderian for the gold in the 80-kg division at the 2014 Asian Wrestling Championships in Astana, Kazakhstan, producing a remarkable medal tally of five (the other contained a silver and three bronze).
