= Andrea Minguzzi =

Italian Greco-Roman wrestler

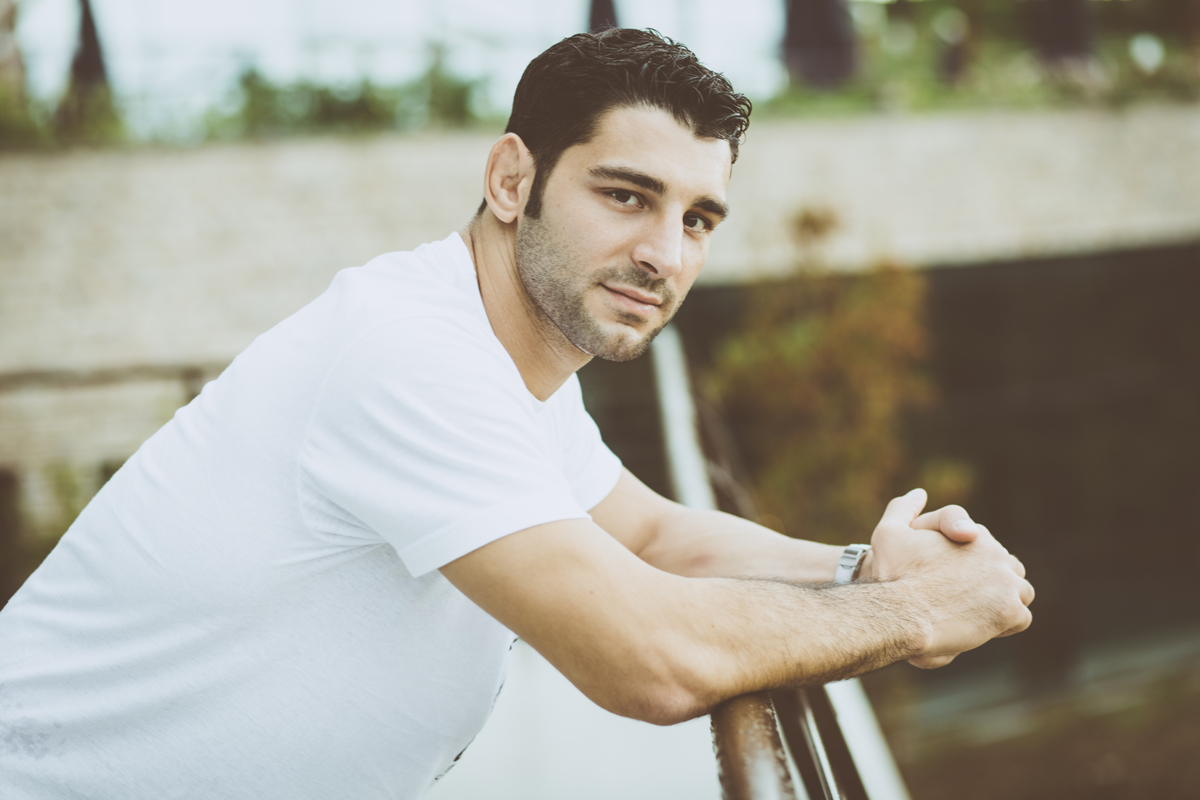

Personal information
- Born: 1 February 1982 (age 44) Castel San Pietro Terme, Italy
- Height: 1.80 m (5 ft 11 in)
- Weight: 90 kg (198 lb)

Sport
- Sport: Wrestling
- Event: Greco-Roman
- Club: CA Lotte Faenza
- Coached by: Vincenzo Maenza; Marco Papacci
Medal record
Men's Greco-Roman wrestling
Representing Italy
Olympic Games
Gold medal – first place	2008 Beijing	84 kg
European Championships
Bronze medal – third place	2007 Sofia	84 kg
Bronze medal – third place	2008 Tampere	84 kg
Mediterranean Games
Silver medal – second place	2009 Pescara	84 kg

Andrea Minguzzi (born 1 February 1982) is an Italian Greco-Roman wrestler. He won a gold medal in the 2008 Summer Olympics.

== Biography ==
Minguzzi was born on 1 February 1982 in Castel San Pietro Terme. His father was also a wrestler in the 1970s. He began his club career in the US Placci Bubano of Mordano. After moving to the Club Atletico CISA of Faenza, he was coached by Olympic champion Vincenzo Maenza. Since 2004 he competed under the Gruppo Sportivo Fiamme Oro, the sports group of the Polizia di Stato.

He won a team title in 2006 and 10 individual titles from 2000 to 2013 at the Italian Championships. In 2007 and 2008, Minguzzi won a bronze medal at the European Wrestling Championships.

At the 2008 Summer Olympics in Beijing, Minguzzi defeated Mélonin Noumonvi (France) in the first turn, the former Olympic Champion and current World Champion Aleksey Mishin (Russia) in the quarterfinals, Ara Abrahamian (Sweden) by controversial judging in the semifinals, and Zoltán Fodor (Hungary) in the final match. He won the gold medal and became the first Italian Olympic Champion in wrestling in 20 years after his teacher Maenza.

Abrahamian and the Swedish coach Leo Mylläri disputed the judges' ruling. Mylläri accused the judges of corruption because they initially awarded Abrahamian a point, but after the round they assigned the point and the match to Minguzzi because Abrahamian had his hand in the blue zone. Normally, having a hand in the blue zone is not penalized. Minguzzi had almost his whole body in the blue zone earlier in this match. Therefore, the Swedes demanded a video review of the match, but the referees refused to review the recording of the incidents nor consider the written Swedish protest. During the medal ceremony, Abrahamian, who won a bronze medal in the repechage, stepped off the podium and placed the medal in the center of the wrestling mat and left. Abrahamian later stated the corrupt judges had been bribed, and pointed out that the judge through marriage is related to Raphaël Martinetti, the President of FILA, the governing body of wrestling.

The next year Minguzzi won a silver medal at the June 26, 2009 at the 2009 Mediterranean Games.

He was unable to qualify to participate at the 2012 Summer Olympics.

== Awards ==
- Order of Merit of the Italian Republic (1 September 2008, Rome)
- Golden Collar for Sporting Merit
