= Taleb Nematpour =

Iranian wrestler (born 1984)

Personal information
- Native name: طالب نعمت پور
- Full name: Taleb Nematpour
- Nationality: Iranian
- Born: September 19, 1984 (age 41) Koohdasht, Iran
- Height: 1.81 m (5 ft 11 in)
- Weight: 88 kg (194 lb)

Sport
- Country: Iran
- Sport: Sport wrestling
- Event: Greco-Roman 84kg
Medal record
Representing Iran
Men's Greco-Roman wrestling
World Championships
Gold medal – first place	2013 Budapest	84 kg
Asian Games
Gold medal – first place	2010 Guangzhou	84 kg
Asian Championships
Gold medal – first place	2009 Pattaya	84 kg
Silver medal – second place	2008 Jeju City	84 kg
Bronze medal – third place	2013 New Delhi	84 kg

Taleb Nematpour (Persian: طالب نعمت‌پور, born 19 September 1984 in Koohdasht, Iran) is an Iranian wrestler. He won gold in the Greco-Roman 84 kilogram class in the world championships in 2013. In 2014, he was banned for doping for two years, with the substance epi-trenbolone. Nematpour announced his retirement at age 31 in November 2015.
