= Yunior Estrada =

Cuban Greco-Roman wrestler

Personal information
- Born: 23 September 1986 (age 39) Camagüey, Cuba

Sport
- Sport: Greco-Roman wrestling
Medal record
Representing Cuba
Pan American Games
Gold medal – first place	2011 Guadalajara	-96kg
Bronze medal – third place	2007 Rio de Janeiro	-84kg

Yunior Estrada Falcón (born 23 September 1986) is a Cuban Greco-Roman wrestler. He competed in the Greco-Roman 96 kg event at the 2012 Summer Olympics, where he was defeated by Artur Aleksanyan in the bronze medal match. This was an improvement on his 2008 Olympic result - in 2008, he competed in the light-heavyweight Greco-Roman division (84 kg), reaching the second round where he was beaten by Ara Abrahamian.
