= Kim Jung-sub =

South Korean Greco-Roman wrestler

Kim Jung-Sub
Personal information
- Nationality: South Korea
- Born: 11 October 1975 (age 50)
- Height: 1.80 m (5 ft 11 in)
- Weight: 84 kg (185 lb)

Sport
- Sport: Wrestling
- Event: Greco-Roman
- Club: Samsung Life Sports Club
- Coached by: Kim In-Sub
Medal record
Men's Greco-Roman wrestling
Representing South Korea
Asian Games
Gold medal – first place	2006 Doha	84 kg
Silver medal – second place	2002 Busan	84 kg
Bronze medal – third place	1998 Bangkok	76 kg
Asian Championships
Gold medal – first place	2005 Wuhan	84 kg
Gold medal – first place	2006 Almaty	84 kg
Bronze medal – third place	2004 Almaty	84 kg

Kim Jung-Sub (born October 11, 1975) is an amateur South Korean Greco-Roman wrestler, who played for the men's light heavyweight category. Kim had won three medals (gold, silver, and bronze) for his division at the Asian Games (1998 in Bangkok, 2002 in Busan, and 2006 in Doha). He also claimed two more gold medals at the 2005 Asian Wrestling Championships in Wuhan, China, and at the 2006 Asian Wrestling Championships in Almaty, Kazakhstan. Kim is a member of the wrestling team for Samsung Life Sports Club, and is coached and trained by his brother Kim In-Sub, silver medalist in the 58 kg division at the 2000 Summer Olympics in Sydney.

Kim represented South Korea at the 2008 Summer Olympics in Beijing, where he competed for the men's 84 kg class. Unfortunately, he lost the qualifying round match to Sweden's Ara Abrahamian, with a three-set technical score (1–3, 1–1, 1–1), and a classification point score of 1–3.
