= Anikó Hódi =

Hungarian Olympic cyclist

Personal information
- Born: 11 April 1986 (age 40) Hódmezővásárhely, Hungary
- Height: 1.60 m (5 ft 3 in)
- Weight: 73 kg (161 lb)

Cycling career
- Sport: Cycling
- Current team: Honvéd Bercsényi SE
- Discipline: Bicycle motocross (BMX)
- Role: Rider
- Rider type: Off road

Anikó Hódi (born 11 April 1986) is a Hungarian amateur BMX cyclist. She represented her nation Hungary, as a 22-year-old elite rider, at the 2008 Summer Olympics and has been training throughout most of her BMX cycling career for Honvéd Bercsényi SE.

Hodi qualified for the Hungarian squad, as the nation's lone female rider, in women's BMX cycling at the 2008 Summer Olympics in Beijing by receiving an invitational berth from the Union Cycliste Internationale (UCI) based on her best performance at the UCI World Championships in Victoria, British Columbia, Canada. After she grabbed a fifteenth seed on the morning prelims with a time of 41.772, Hodi scored a total of 18 placing points to mount a sixth spot in the semifinals, thus eliminating her from the tournament.
