= Dina Hafizova =

Uzbekistani freestyle wrestler

Dinara Hafizova Динара Хафизова
Personal information
- Full name: Dinara Abdulkhalikovna Hafizova
- National team: Uzbekistan
- Citizenship: Uzbekistani; American
- Born: September 24, 1982 (age 43) Tashkent, Uzbekistan, Soviet Union
- Height: 1.60 m (5 ft 3 in)
- Weight: 51 kg (112 lb)

Sport
- Country: Uzbekistan; United States
- Sport: Wrestling
- Rank: International Master of Sports
- Event: Freestyle
- Club: Dynamo WC, SAM WC
- Coached by: Anatoly Ibragimov, Vladimir Orlov
Medal record
Representing Uzbekistan
Asian Championships
Silver medal – second place	2005 Wuhan	51 kg
Golden Grand Prix Ivan Yarygin
Bronze medal – third place	2007 Krasnoyarsk	51 kg

Dinara Abdulkhalikovna Hafizova (Mirzaeva) (Russian: Динара Абдулхаликовна Хафизова (Мирзаева); born September 24, 1982) is a retired Uzbekistani and American freestyle wrestler who competed in the women's 51-kg. She earned the silver medal at the 2005 Asian Wrestling Championships. Multiple Uzbekistan national champion.

== Biography ==
Dina was born in Tashkent, Uzbekistan. She started training in Judo at the age of 10 and begun wrestling at the age of 19, after high school, she jointed Police academy. In 2014 she moved to the United States, in 2019 she got American citizenship. Dina married to 2008 & 2020 Greco-Roman Olympian Ildar Hafizov. In present, she works as a volunteer in the U.S. Olympic & Paralympic training centre.

== Championships and achievements ==
- Asian Wrestling Championships 2005 – 2nd (51 kg)
- World Wrestling Championships 2005 – 7th (51 kg)
- Asian Games 2006 – 10th (48 kg)
- Ivan Yarygin Golden Grand-Prix 2007 – 3rd (51 kg)
- Alexander Medved international 2007 – 3rd (51 kg)
