= Jenny Fähndrich =

Swiss BMX rider (born 1989)

Personal information
- Full name: Jenny Fähndrich
- Born: 25 April 1989 (age 37) Carouge, Switzerland
- Height: 1.65 m (5 ft 5 in)
- Weight: 70 kg (154 lb)

Cycling career
- Sport: Cycling
- Current team: BC Geneva
- Discipline: Bicycle motocross (BMX)
- Role: Rider
- Rider type: Off road

Jenny Fähndrich (born 25 April 1989 in Carouge) is a Swiss professional BMX cyclist. She has claimed seven Swiss national championship titles in women's BMX category, and also represented her nation Switzerland, as a 19-year-old junior, at the 2008 Summer Olympics. Fahndrich has currently raced professionally for Bicicross Club Geneva under her personal and head coach Hervé Krebs.

Fahndrich qualified for the Swiss squad, as a lone female rider, in women's BMX cycling at the 2008 Summer Olympics in Beijing by receiving an invitational berth from the Union Cycliste Internationale, based on her best performance at the UCI World Championships in Taiyuan, China. After she grabbed a ninth seed on the morning prelims with a time of 38.209, Fahndrich scored a total of 17 placing points to take the sixth spot in the semifinals, thus eliminating her from the tournament.
