= Lieke Klaus =

Dutch BMX racer (born 1989)

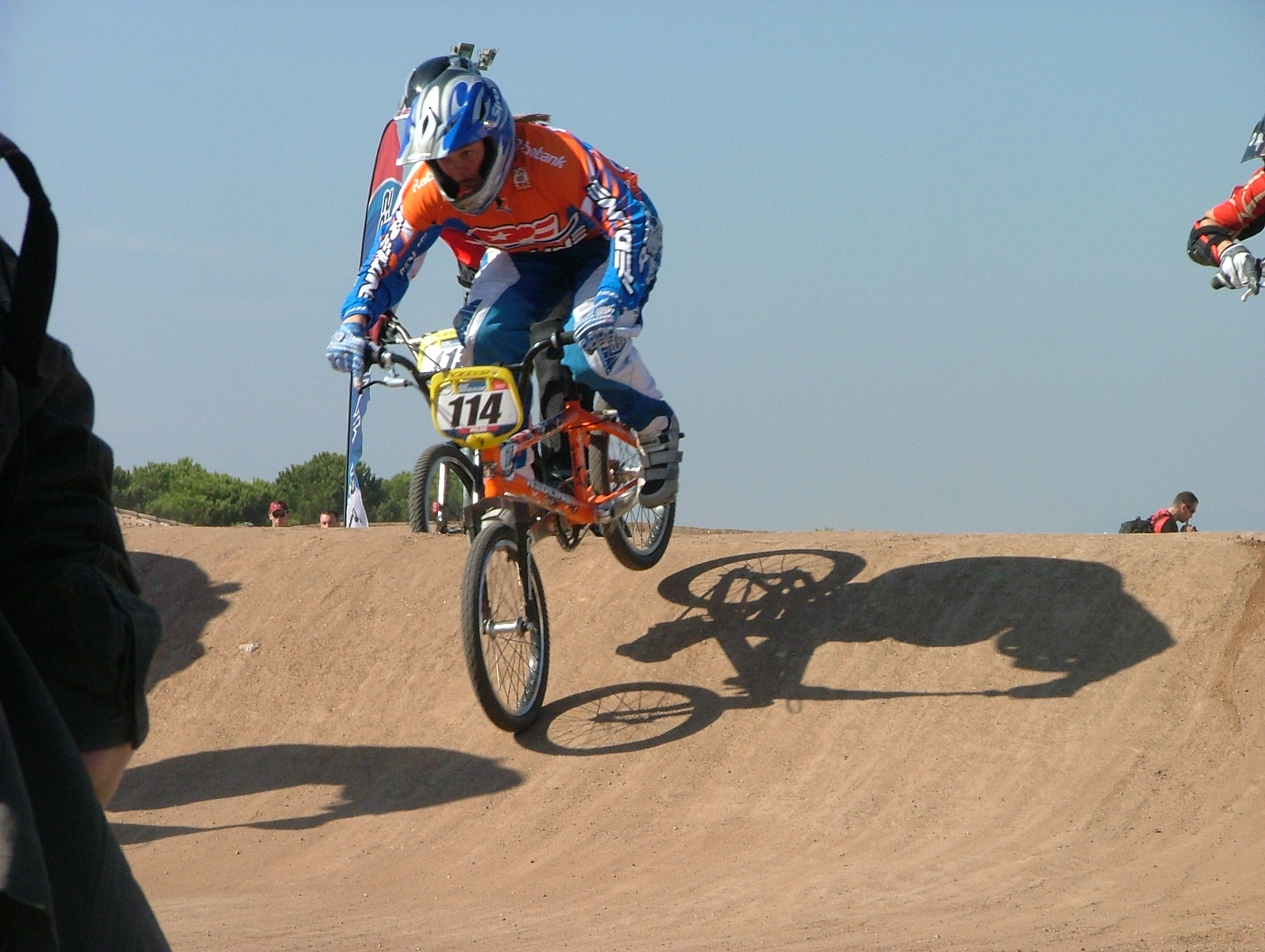
Lieke Klaus

Lieke Klaus (born October 28, 1989, in Wijchen, Gelderland) is a Dutch BMX racer.

Klaus reached her first podium spot at a BMX World Cup meeting in 2007 when she won the bronze medal in Victoria, British Columbia, Canada. In 2008, she reached the quarter-final at the World Championships in Taiyuan and she qualified for the 2008 Summer Olympics in Beijing.

During the 2011 UCI World Championships of BMX in Copenhagen, Denmark, Lieke reached a 14th place in the Elite Women Time-Trial Superfinal and reached a 4th place in the Elite Women Challenge competition.

These results moved Klaus to rank 40 in the world, according to Union Cycliste Internationale (UCI).

== Palmarès ==
=== BMX ===
2011
14th UCI World Championships, Time-Trial Superfinal
4th UCI World Championships, Challenge competition

=== Track cycling ===
2008
3rd 2008 Dutch National Track Championships, sprint
2010
3rd 2010 Dutch National Track Championships, sprint

== See also ==
- List of Dutch Olympic cyclists
