= Denis Forov =

Armenian Greco-Roman wrestler

Personal information
- Born: 3 December 1984 (age 41) Zhmerynka, Ukraine
- Height: 1.75 m (5 ft 9 in)
- Weight: 84 kg (185 lb)

Sport
- Sport: Wrestling
- Event: Greco-Roman
- Club: Torpedo Moscow
- Coached by: Vladimir Uruimagov; Samvel Gevorgyan
Medal record
Men's Greco-Roman wrestling
Representing Armenia
European Championships
Silver medal – second place	2006 Moscow	84 kg

Denis Mikolayovich Forov (Armenian: Դենիս Ֆորով, born 3 December 1984) is a retired Armenian Greco-Roman wrestler. He was on the Ukrainian national wrestling team as a cadet and the Russian national wrestling team as a junior.

He became a Junior European CHampion in 2002 and a Junior World Champion in 2003. Forov won a silver medal at the 2006 European Wrestling Championships. He competed at the 2008 Summer Olympics in the men's Greco-Roman 84 kg division.

Forov was a member of the Armenian Greco-Roman wrestling team at the 2010 Wrestling World Cup. The Armenian team came in third place.
