= Badri Khasaia =

Georgian Greco-Roman wrestler

Personal information
- Nationality: Georgia
- Born: 24 September 1979 (age 46)
- Height: 1.80 m (5 ft 11 in)
- Weight: 84 kg (185 lb)

Sport
- Sport: Wrestling
- Event: Greco-Roman
- Club: Dynamo Tbilisi
- Coached by: Damerlan Davidaia
Medal record
Men's Greco-Roman wrestling
Representing Georgia
World Championships
Silver medal – second place	2002 Moscow	84 kg
Bronze medal – third place	2007 Baku	84 kg
European Championship
Gold medal – first place	2002 Seinaejoki	74 kg
Bronze medal – third place	2005 Varna	84 kg
Silver medal – second place	2008 Tampere	84 kg

Badri Khasaia (Georgian: ბადრი ხასაია; born September 24, 1979) is an amateur Georgian Greco-Roman wrestler, who played for the men's light heavyweight category. He won a silver medal for his division at the 2002 World Wrestling Championships in Moscow, Russia, and bronze at the 2007 World Wrestling Championships in Baku, Azerbaijan. He also added two more medals to his collection from the European Championships (2005 in Varna, Bulgaria, and 2008 in Tampere, Finland). Khasaia is a member of the wrestling team for Dynamo Tbilisi, and is coached and trained by Damerlan Davidaia.

Khasaia represented Georgia at the 2008 Summer Olympics, where he competed for the men's 84 kg class. He received a bye for the second preliminary round, before losing out to Turkish wrestler and three-time Olympian Nazmi Avluca, who was able to score five points in two straight periods, leaving Khasaia with a single point.
