= Nicole Callisto =

Australian BMX cyclist (born 1987)

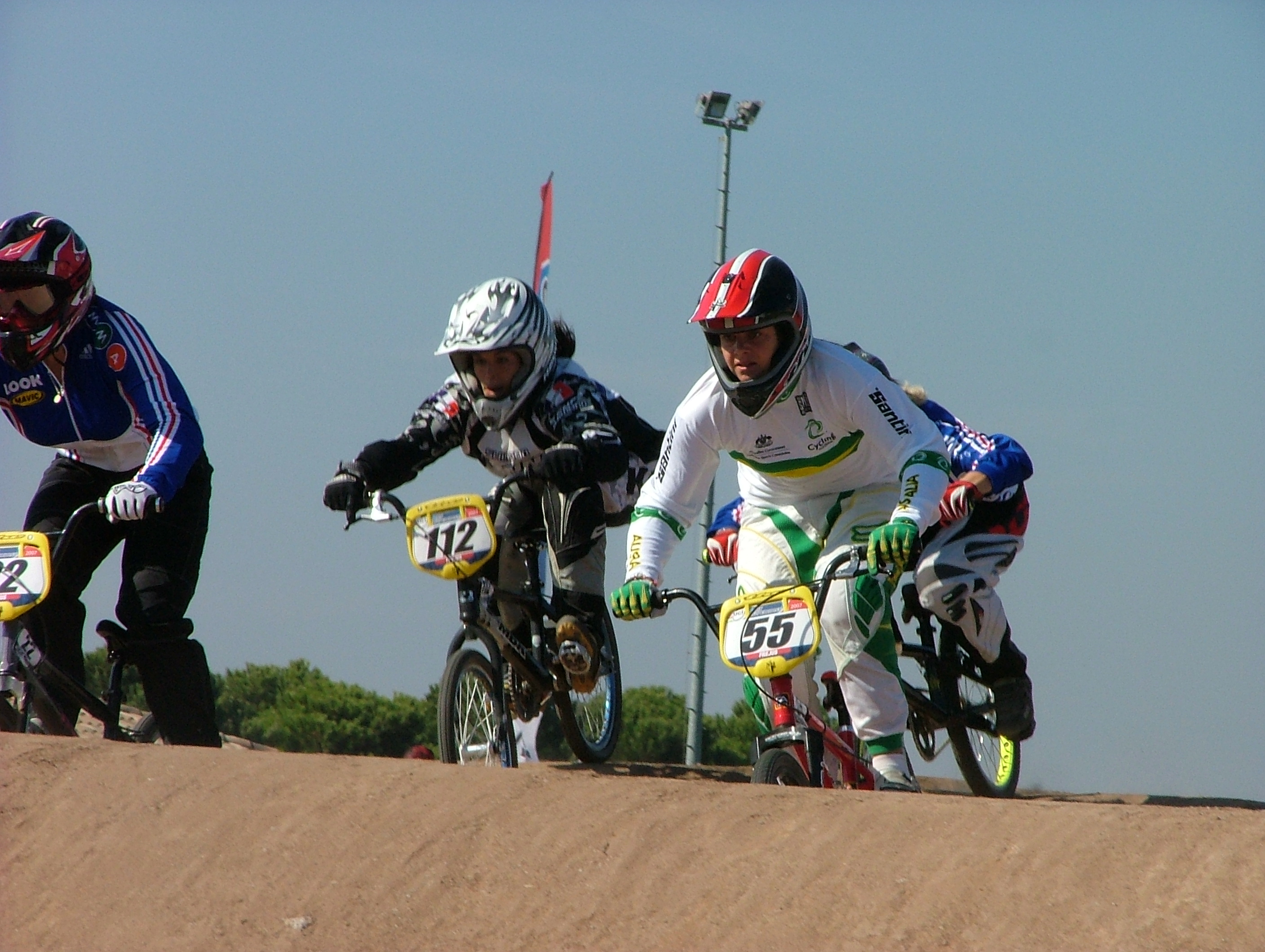
- Nicole Callisto (right)

Personal information
- Full name: Nicole Callisto
- Born: 12 November 1987 (age 38) Joondalup, Australia
- Height: 1.70 m (5 ft 7 in)
- Weight: 66 kg (146 lb)

Cycling career
- Sport: Cycling
- Current team: Free Agent World Team
- Discipline: Bicycle motocross (BMX racing)

Major wins
- 2005 Junior World BMX Championships

Nicole Callisto (born 12 November 1987 in Joondalup, Western Australia) is an Australian BMX cyclist who represented Australia at the 2008 Summer Olympics in Beijing. She began riding when she was three and won the 2005 Junior World BMX Championships. Callisto has been under contract with Free Agent Bicycles for the Free Agent World BMX Team since the 2006 BMX racing season.

Callisto currently lives in the Sydney, Australia area, and frequently travels out of country to compete in international BMX events called "world(s)" events.
