= Ara Abrahamian =

Armenian-Swedish Greco-Roman wrestler

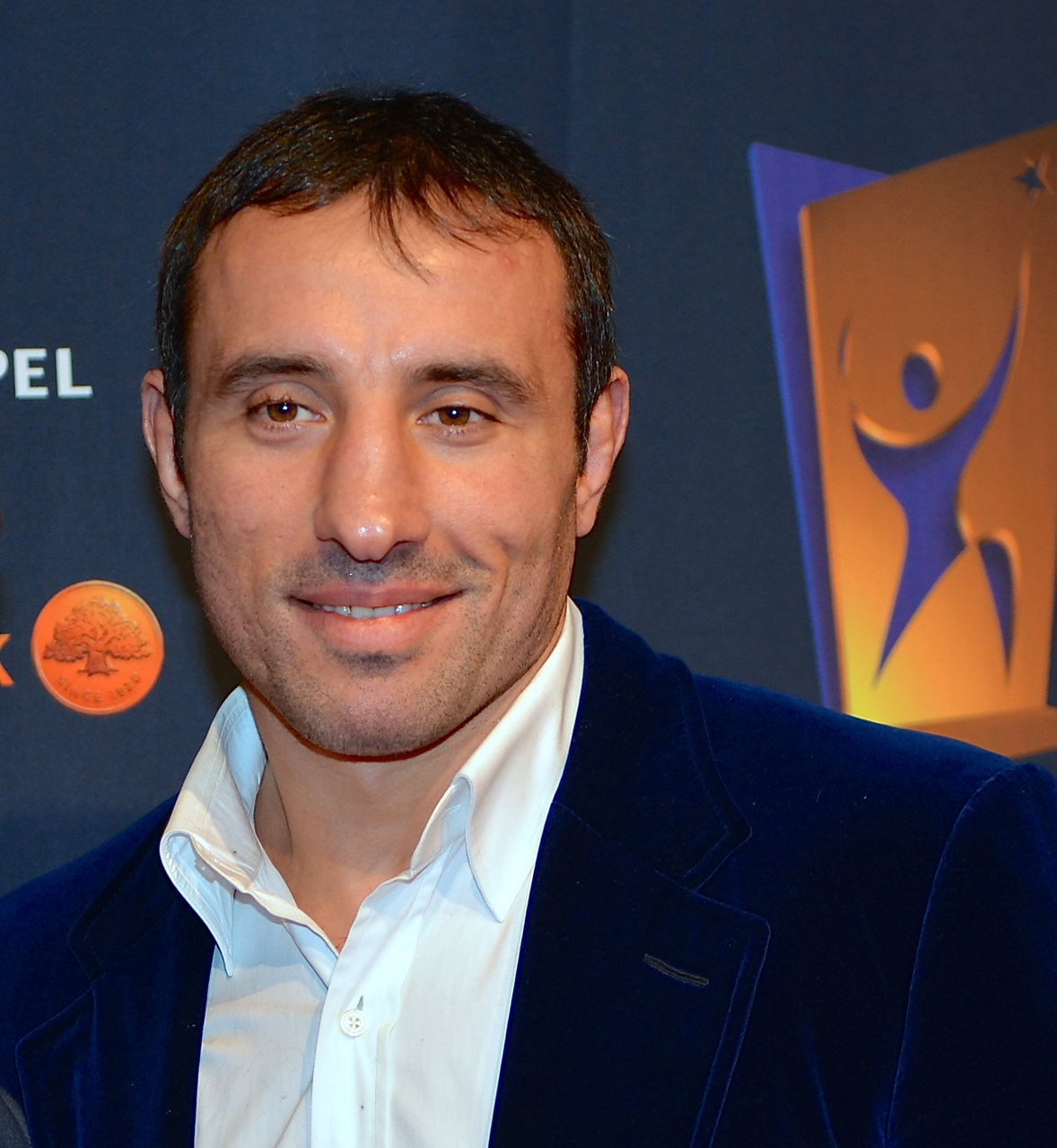
- Ara Abrahamian during the Swedish Sports Awards inside the Stockholm Globe Arena in Stockholm, Sweden in January 2014

Personal information
- Full name: Ara Abrahamian
- Born: 27 July 1975 (age 50) Leninakan, Armenian SSR (now Gyumri, Armenia)
- Height: 1.76 m (5 ft 9 1/2 in)
- Weight: 84 kg (185 lb)

Sport
- Country: Armenia; Sweden
- Sport: Wrestling
- Event: Greco-Roman
- Club: Spårvägens BK
- Coached by: Ryszard Świerad
Medal record
Representing Sweden
Men's Greco-Roman wrestling
Olympic Games
Silver medal – second place	2004 Athens	84 kg
Disqualified	2008 Beijing	84 kg
World Championships
Gold medal – first place	2001 Patras	76 kg
Gold medal – first place	2002 Moscow	84 kg
Silver medal – second place	2003 Créteil	84 kg
European Championships
Silver medal – second place	2001 Istanbul	76 kg
Silver medal – second place	2002 Seinäjoki	84 kg
Bronze medal – third place	2008 Tampere	84 kg

Ara Abrahamian (Armenian: Արա Աբրահամյան; born 27 July 1975) is an Armenian-Swedish former wrestler in Greco-Roman wrestling. He has won two World Championships in the 76 kg and 84 kg weight classes and a silver medal at the 2004 Summer Olympics in the 84 kg weight class.

Abrahamian won the bronze match at the 2008 Summer Olympics, but he rejected the medal because of a controversial ruling in the semifinal. During the highly publicised medal ceremony, Abrahamian protested by placing the medal in the center of the mat and walking away. He was later disqualified by the International Olympic Committee (IOC) and stripped of his rejected bronze medal for disrupting the award ceremony. This resulted in him receiving a lifetime ban from the Olympics. He was also banned from wrestling for two years by FILA, but the ban was overturned by the Court of Arbitration for Sport in March 2009.

== Biography ==
Abrahamian began his wrestling career at the age of eight in Armenia. He became Armenian junior champion on three occasions. In 1994 he arrived in Stockholm, Sweden, to compete in the Stockholm Junior Open, which he won. He defected from the Armenia national team and joined the Swedish team in 1998.

== Participation in the Olympics ==
=== 2000 Summer Olympics ===
Abrahamian represented Sweden in Greco-Roman Wrestling in the 2000 Summer Olympics in the 69-76 kg weight category.

=== 2004 Summer Olympics ===
Abrahamian's participation in the 2004 Summer Olympics was planned to mark the end of his career, and he was determined to bring home the gold medal. After losing the prolonged final with Alexei Michine of Russia, Abrahamian wrote on his homepage: "The final ended 1-1. That means losing, in case you meet a Russian."

Pelle Svensson, a former two-time world champion (Greco-Roman 100 kg class) and member of board of FILA from 1990 to 2007, witnessed how the Russian team leader Mikhail Mamiashvili was giving signs to the referee. When Svensson approached him and informed him that this was not allowed according to the rules, Mamiashvili responded by saying: "you should know that this may lead to your death". Svensson later found proof that the Romanian referee was bribed (according to Svensson the referee had received over one million Swedish krona).

=== 2008 Summer Olympics ===
==== Semi-final ====
Following a loss in the semi-finals of the Greco-Roman 84 kg event at the 2008 Summer Olympics to the eventual winner Andrea Minguzzi of Italy, he and the Swedish coach Leo Mylläri disputed the judges' ruling. Mylläri accused the judges of corruption because they initially awarded Abrahamian a point, but after the round they assigned the point and the match to Minguzzi because Abrahamian had his hand in the blue zone. Normally, having a hand in the blue zone is not penalized. Minguzzi had almost his whole body in the blue zone earlier in this match. Therefore, the Swedes demanded a video review of the match, but the referees refused to review the recording of the incidents nor consider the written Swedish protest.

==== Medal ceremony ====
Abrahamian returned to the event to compete in the resulting bronze bout and won. After he received his medal at the ceremony, he calmly shook the hand of the presenter and then the hand of the other bronze medal winner. He then stepped off the podium and placed the medal in the center of the wrestling mat and left the ceremony. Abrahamian complained later about the corrupt judges and declared that he was retiring from the sport. Abrahamian says that the judges had been bribed, and reminded that the judge through marriage is related to Raphaël Martinetti, the President of FILA, the governing body of wrestling.

==== IOC hearing ====
The International Olympic Committee held a "disciplinary hearing" on Abrahamian after the incident, where it was decided that Abrahamian would be disqualified and excluded from the Olympic Games due to "violating the spirit of fair play". After the hearing, Abrahamian declared to a Swedish newspaper that the FILA representative stated after 1.5 hours into the hearing that he could not speak English, and he merely read some lines from a paper he had written in French. Abrahamian was later banned for life, as he did not apologize to the IOC. The medal was not awarded to him or to Chinese wrestler Ma Sanyi, because it did not happen in the award ceremony.

==== CAS hearing ====
The Court of Arbitration for Sport also held a hearing based on the request which was issued by Abrahamian and the Swedish Olympic Committee against the FILA. Preceding the hearing CAS declared in a statement that Abrahamian and the SOC "do not seek from the CAS any particular relief" regarding the ranking of the medals or a review of the IOC decision to exclude Abrahamian from the games.

Following the CAS issued an arbitration strongly criticizing FILA. Not challenging the outcome of the match and the technical judgments, the arbitration stated that the FILA is required to provide an appeal jury capable of dealing promptly with the claims of the athletes. Moreover, CAS, concluded that "In any event, FILA did not follow Article 22 properly, if at all, or provide any other appropriate appeal mechanism in this case."

The chairman of the Swedish Olympic Committee, Stefan Lindeberg, commented that the decision once and for all shows that FILA did not act correctly and that they did not follow their own rules of fair play.

In February 2009 CAS rejected an appeal requesting reinstatement of the bronze medal.

==== FILA verdict ====
On 6 November 2008, FILA published the verdicts of their investigation, in which they suspended Abrahamian and coach Mylläri for two years, and banned Sweden's wrestling federation from hosting international events for the same duration. Money fines were also issued to all three parties. In their statement FILA justified the verdict with Abrahamian's "scandalous behaviour" and "serious lack of Olympic spirit". They also declared that "the coach has been judged equally guilty since he did not intervene to calm his wrestler" and that "the federation was responsible for the behavior of its members, the wrestler and the coach, which was reprehensible". They also stated that the decision by the judges in the disputed bout was made according to the rules.

==== Freed from ban ====
In March 2009 the Court of Arbitration for Sport overturned FILA's ban on Abrahamian. On 27 August 2009 it was revealed that Abrahamian was free to continue wrestling, that he would not be banned at all for his actions during the medal ceremony, that he does not have to pay any fine to FILA, and that there will be no obstacle for the Swedish wrestling organization to host tournaments in the future.

== Major achievements ==
Year	Meet	Venue	Age group	Weight class (kg)	Competing for	Results
1994	European Championships	Istanbul, Turkey	Juniors	74.0	Armenia	7th
1996	European Championships	Budapest, Hungary	Seniors	74.0	Armenia	12th
1998	World Championships	Gävle, Sweden	Seniors	85.0	Armenia	17th
1999	World Championships	Athens, Greece	Seniors	76.0	Sweden	7th
2000	European Championships	Moscow, Russia	Seniors	76.0	Sweden	6th
2000	Olympic Games	Sydney, Australia	Seniors	76.0	Sweden	6th
2001	European Championships	Istanbul, Turkey	Seniors	76.0	Sweden	2nd
2001	World Championships	Patras, Greece	Seniors	76.0	Sweden	1st
2002	European Championships	Seinäjoki, Finland	Seniors	84.0	Sweden	2nd
2002	World Championships	Moscow, Russia	Seniors	84.0	Sweden	1st
2003	World Championships	Créteil, France	Seniors	84.0	Sweden	2nd
2004	Olympic Games	Athens, Greece	Seniors	84.0	Sweden	2nd
2006	World Championships	Guangzhou, China	Seniors	84.0	Sweden	8th
2007	World Championships	Baku, Azerbaijan	Seniors	84.0	Sweden	5th
2008	European Championships	Tampere, Finland	Seniors	84.0	Sweden	3rd
2008	Olympic Games	Beijing, China	Seniors	84.0	Sweden	3rd, later Disqualified
