= Zoltán Fodor (wrestler) =

Hungarian wrestler (born 1985)

Medal record

Men's Greco-Roman wrestling

Representing Hungary

Olympic Games
Silver medal – second place	2008 Beijing	84 kg

Zoltán Fodor (born 29 July 1985 in Budapest) is a Hungarian Greco-Roman wrestler, who won a silver medal at the 2008 Summer Olympics in the 84 kg weight division.
