= Ma Sanyi =

Chinese Greco-Roman wrestler

Ma Sanyi (Chinese: 马•三义, born 1 June 1982 in Anhui) is a male Chinese Greco-Roman wrestler who competed at the 2008 Summer Olympics. He placed fifth in the light-heavyweight class. In 2005, he won a gold medal in the men's 84-kg Greco-Roman wrestling final in the 10th National Games.

== See also ==
- China at the 2008 Summer Olympics for more details
