= Wrestling at the 1984 Summer Olympics – Men's Greco-Roman 74 kg =

Men's Greco-Roman 74 kg at the Games of the XXIII Olympiad
- Venue: Anaheim Convention Center
- Dates: 31 July–2 August 1984
- Competitors: 17 from 17 nations

Medalists
1st place, gold medalist(s)		Jouko Salomäki	Finland
2nd place, silver medalist(s)		Roger Tallroth	Sweden
3rd place, bronze medalist(s)		Ștefan Rusu	Romania

The Men's Greco-Roman 74 kg at the 1984 Summer Olympics as part of the wrestling program were held at the Anaheim Convention Center, Anaheim, California.

== Medalists ==
Gold	Jouko Salomäki; Finland
Silver	Roger Tallroth; Sweden
Bronze	Ștefan Rusu; Romania

== Tournament results ==
The wrestlers are divided into 2 groups. The winner of each group decided by a double-elimination system.

Legend

- TF — Won by Fall
- ST — Won by Technical Superiority, 12 points difference
- PP — Won by Points, 1-7 points difference, the loser with points
- PO — Won by Points, 1-7 points difference, the loser without points
- SP — Won by Points, 8-11 points difference, the loser with points
- SO — Won by Points, 8-11 points difference, the loser without points
- P0 — Won by Passivity, scoring zero points
- P1 — Won by Passivity, while leading by 1-7 points
- PS — Won by Passivity, while leading by 8-11 points
- DC — Won by Decision, 0-0 score
- PA — Won by Opponent Injury
- DQ — Won by Forfeit
- DNA — Did not appear
- L — Losses
- ER — Round of Elimination
- CP — Classification Points
- TP — Technical Points

=== Eliminatory round ===
==== Group A ====
L		CP	TP		L
Round 1
1	Oscar Strático (ARG)	0-4 ST	0-12	Karl-Heinz Helbing (FRG)	0
0	Kim Young-Nam (KOR)	3-1 PP	12-6	Christopher Catalfo (USA)	1
1	Issam Awarke (LIB)	0-4 ST	0-13	Martial Mischler (FRA)	0
1	Takahiro Mukai (JPN)	1-3 PP	9-10	Celal Taşkıran (TUR)	0
0	Roger Tallroth (SWE)			Bye	
Round 2
0	Roger Tallroth (SWE)	4-0 ST	12-0	Oscar Strático (ARG)	2
1	Karl-Heinz Helbing (FRG)	1-3 PP	2-7	Kim Young-Nam (KOR)	0
1	Christopher Catalfo (USA)	4-0 DQ	1:40	Issam Awarke (LIB)	2
0	Martial Mischler (FRA)	4-0 ST	13-1	Takahiro Mukai (JPN)	2
0	Celal Taşkıran (TUR)			Bye	
Round 3
1	Celal Taşkıran (TUR)	0-3.5 PS	5:13	Roger Tallroth (SWE)	0
2	Karl-Heinz Helbing (FRG)	.5-3.5 SP	3-13	Christopher Catalfo (USA)	1
0	Kim Young-Nam (KOR)	3-1 PP	7-3	Martial Mischler (FRA)	1
Round 4
2	Celal Taşkıran (TUR)	1-3 PP	3-9	Kim Young-Nam (KOR)	0
0	Roger Tallroth (SWE)	3.5-.5 SP	13-4	Christopher Catalfo (USA)	2
1	Martial Mischler (FRA)			Bye	
Final
	Kim Young-Nam (KOR)	3-1 PP	7-3	Martial Mischler (FRA)	
	Martial Mischler (FRA)	0-3.5 PS	5:46	Roger Tallroth (SWE)	
	Roger Tallroth (SWE)	3.5-0 SO	11-0	Kim Young-Nam (KOR)	

Wrestler	L	ER	CP	Final
Roger Tallroth (SWE)	0	-	11	7
Kim Young-Nam (KOR)	0	-	12	3
Martial Mischler (FRA)	1	-	9	1
Christopher Catalfo (USA)	2	4	9	
Celal Taşkıran (TUR)	2	4	4	
Karl-Heinz Helbing (FRG)	2	3	5.5	
Takahiro Mukai (JPN)	2	2	1	
Issam Awarke (LIB)	2	2	0	
Oscar Strático (ARG)	2	2	0	

==== Group B ====
L		CP	TP		L
Round 1
1	Jeff Stuebing (CAN)	0-4 ST	0-12	Ștefan Rusu (ROU)	0
1	Ali Hussain Faris (IRQ)	0-4 ST	0-12	Jouko Salomäki (FIN)	0
1	Romelio Salas (COL)	1-3 PP	5-12	Mohamed Hamad (EGY)	0
0	Karolj Kasap (YUG)	3.5-.5 SP	13-3	Abdel Aziz Tahir (MAR)	1
Round 2
1	Jeff Stuebing (CAN)	4-0 TF	4:56	Ali Hussain Faris (IRQ)	2
1	Ștefan Rusu (ROU)	1-3 DC	0-0	Jouko Salomäki (FIN)	0
2	Romelio Salas (COL)	0-4 ST	0-13	Karolj Kasap (YUG)	0
0	Mohamed Hamad (EGY)	3-1 DC	0-0	Abdelaziz Tahir (MAR)	2
Round 3
2	Jeff Stuebing (CAN)	0-3 PO	0-3	Jouko Salomäki (FIN)	0
1	Ștefan Rusu (ROU)	4-0 ST	14-0	Mohamed Hamad (EGY)	1
0	Karolj Kasap (YUG)			Bye	
Round 4
1	Karolj Kasap (YUG)	1-3 PP	2-4	Ștefan Rusu (ROU)	1
0	Jouko Salomäki (FIN)	4-0 ST	12-0	Mohamed Hamad (EGY)	2
Final
	Ștefan Rusu (ROU)	1-3 DC	0-0	Jouko Salomäki (FIN)	
	Karolj Kasap (YUG)	1-3 PP	2-4	Ștefan Rusu (ROU)	
	Jouko Salomäki (FIN)	1-3 PP	1-5	Karolj Kasap (YUG)	

Wrestler	L	ER	CP	Final
Jouko Salomäki (FIN)	0	-	14	4
Ștefan Rusu (ROU)	1	-	12	4
Karolj Kasap (YUG)	1	-	8.5	4
Mohamed Hamad (EGY)	2	4	6	
Jeff Stuebing (CAN)	2	3	4	
Abdelaziz Tahir (MAR)	2	2	1.5	
Romelio Salas (COL)	2	2	1	
Ali Hussain Faris (IRQ)	2	2	0	

=== Final round ===
	CP	TP	
5th place match
Martial Mischler (FRA)	1-3 PP	3-6	Karolj Kasap (YUG)
Bronze medal match
Kim Young-Nam (KOR)	1-3 PP	1-6	Ștefan Rusu (ROU)
Gold medal match
Roger Tallroth (SWE)	1-3 PP	4-5	Jouko Salomäki (FIN)

== Final standings ==
1. Jouko Salomäki (FIN)
2. Roger Tallroth (SWE)
3. Ștefan Rusu (ROU)
4. Kim Young-Nam (KOR)
5. Karolj Kasap (YUG)
6. Martial Mischler (FRA)
7. Christopher Catalfo (USA)
8. Mohamed Hamad (EGY)
