= Mazen =

Mazen is a masculine given name of Arabic origin. Notable people with the name include:

== Given name ==
- Mazen Dana (1962–2003), Palestinian journalist who worked as a Reuters cameraman
- Mazen Darwish (born 1974), Syrian lawyer and free speech advocate
- Mazen Dukhan (born 1969), Syrian physician and politician
- Mazen Faqha (1979–2017), Palestinian militant
- Mazen Gamal (born 1986), Egyptian squash player
- Mazen Ghnaim (born 1956), Israeli Arab politician
- Mazen al-Hamada (1977–2024), Syrian human rights activist
- Mazen Hesham, (born 1994), professional squash player who represents Egypt
- Mazen Abdul-Jawad (born 1977), Saudi prisoner
- Mazen Kerbaj (born 1975), Lebanese jazz musician
- Mazen Khaled, Lebanese-American director
- Mazen Maarouf (born 1978), Palestinian writer
- Mazen Metwaly (born 1990), Saudi Arabian-born Egyptian professional swimmer, specialising in Open water swimming
- Mazen Mneimneh (born 1986), Lebanese basketball player
- Mazen al-Salhani (born 1979), Syrian businessman and politician
- Mazen El Sayed (born 1984), Lebanese hip-hop artist
- Mazen Abu Shararah (born 1991), Saudi footballer
- Mazen Sinokrot (born 1954), Palestinian politician
- Mazen Al-Suwailem (born 1996), Saudi footballer
- Mazen Izzeddin Abdalla Tal (born 1952), Jordanian ambassador
- Mazen Al-Tarazi (born 1962), Syrian-Canadian businessman
- Mazen Tuleimat (born 1952), Syrian wrestler
- Mazen al-Tumeizi (1978–2004), Palestinian journalist, killed during the Haifa Street helicopter incident
- Mazen Al-Yassin (born 1996), Saudi sprinter
- Abu Mazen (born 1935), President of the State of Palestine and Palestinian National Authority
- Ahlam Mazen At-Tamimi (born 1980), Palestinian militant known for her role in Sbarro restaurant suicide bombing

== See also ==
- Matzen (disambiguation)
- Mazenod (disambiguation)
