= Wrestling at the 1984 Summer Olympics – Men's freestyle 74 kg =

Men's freestyle 74 kg at the Games of the XXIII Olympiad
- Venue: Anaheim Convention Center
- Dates: 8–10 August 1984
- Competitors: 22 from 22 nations

Medalists
1st place, gold medalist(s)		Dave Schultz	United States
2nd place, silver medalist(s)		Martin Knosp	West Germany
3rd place, bronze medalist(s)		Šaban Sejdiu	Yugoslavia

The Men's Freestyle 74 kg event at the 1984 Summer Olympics, as part of the wrestling program, was held at the Anaheim Convention Center, Anaheim, California.

== Medalists ==
Gold	Dave Schultz; United States
Silver	Martin Knosp; West Germany
Bronze	Šaban Sejdiu; Yugoslavia

== Tournament results ==
The wrestlers are divided into 2 groups. The winner of each group decided by a double-elimination system.

Legend

- TF — Won by Fall
- ST — Won by Technical Superiority, 12 points difference
- PP — Won by Points, 1-7 points difference, the loser with points
- PO — Won by Points, 1-7 points difference, the loser without points
- SP — Won by Points, 8-11 points difference, the loser with points
- SO — Won by Points, 8-11 points difference, the loser without points
- P0 — Won by Passivity, scoring zero points
- P1 — Won by Passivity, while leading by 1-7 points
- PS — Won by Passivity, while leading by 8-11 points
- DC — Won by Decision, 0-0 score
- PA — Won by Opponent Injury
- DQ — Won by Forfeit
- DNA — Did not appear
- L — Losses
- ER — Round of Elimination
- CP — Classification Points
- TP — Technical Points

=== Eliminatory round ===
==== Group A ====
L		CP	TP		L
Round 1
0	Mohamed Hamad (EGY)	1-3 PP	5-8	Romelio Salas (COL)	1
1	Pekka Rauhala (FIN)	.5-3.5 SP	1-9	Dave Schultz (USA)	0
1	Zane Coleman (NZL)	0-4 TF	5:03	Šaban Sejdiu (YUG)	0
1	Ignacio Ordóñez (ESP)	0-4 ST	0-14	Selahattin Sağan (TUR)	0
0	Ali Hussain Faris (IRQ)	4-0 TF	1:05	Muhammad Gul (PAK)	1
0	Han Myung-Woo (KOR)			Bye	
Round 2
0	Han Myung-Woo (KOR)	4-0 TF	2:00	Mohamed Hamad (EGY)	2
1	Romelio Salas (COL)	0-4 TF	2:50	Pekka Rauhala (FIN)	1
0	Dave Schultz (USA)	4-0 ST	12-0	Zane Coleman (NZL)	2
0	Šaban Sejdiu (YUG)	4-0 ST	12-0	Ignacio Ordóñez (ESP)	2
0	Selahattin Sağan (TUR)	3.5-.5 SP	9-1	Ali Hussain Faris (IRQ)	1
1	Muhammad Gul (PAK)			Bye	
Round 3
2	Muhammad Gul (PAK)	0-4 TF	0:33	Han Myung-Woo (KOR)	0
2	Romelio Salas (COL)	0-4 ST	0-12	Dave Schultz (USA)	0
1	Pekka Rauhala (FIN)	3-1 PP	9-5	Selahattin Sağan (TUR)	1
0	Šaban Sejdiu (YUG)	4-0 ST	13-1	Ali Hussain Faris (IRQ)	2
Round 4
1	Han Myung-Woo (KOR)	1-3 PP	5-6	Pekka Rauhala (FIN)	1
0	Dave Schultz (USA)	4-0 TF	1:46	Šaban Sejdiu (YUG)	1
1	Selahattin Sağan (TUR)			Bye	
Round 5
2	Selahattin Sağan (TUR)	0-3 PO	0-6	Han Myung-Woo (KOR)	1
2	Pekka Rauhala (FIN)	1-3 PP	7-10	Šaban Sejdiu (YUG)	1
0	Dave Schultz (USA)			Bye	
Final
	Dave Schultz (USA)	4-0 TF	1:46	Šaban Sejdiu (YUG)	
	Han Myung-Woo (KOR)	0-3 PO	0-5	Dave Schultz (USA)	
	Šaban Sejdiu (YUG)	3.5-0 SO	8-0	Han Myung-Woo (KOR)	

Wrestler	L	ER	CP	Final
Dave Schultz (USA)	0	-	15.5	7
Šaban Sejdiu (YUG)	1	-	15	3.5
Han Myung-Woo (KOR)	1	-	12	0
Pekka Rauhala (FIN)	2	5	11.5	
Selahattin Sağan (TUR)	2	5	8.5	
Ali Hussain Faris (IRQ)	2	3	4.5	
Romelio Salas (COL)	2	3	3	
Muhammad Gul (PAK)	2	3	0	
Mohamed Hamad (EGY)	2	2	1	
Ignacio Ordóñez (ESP)	2	2	0	
Zane Coleman (NZL)	2	2	0	

==== Group B ====
L		CP	TP		L
Round 1
0	Marc Mongeon (CAN)	4-0 TF	4:30	Fitzlloyd Walker (GBR)	1
1	Naomi Higuchi (JPN)	1-3 PP	2-5	Rajinder Singh (IND)	0
1	Mohamed Zayar (SYR)	0-3 P1	3:14	Houkreo Bambe (CMR)	0
1	Oscar Strático (ARG)	.5-3.5 SP	5-15	Seidu Olawale (NGR)	0
0	Martin Knosp (FRG)	4-0 TF	1:49	Kyriakos Bogiatzis (GRE)	1
0	Craig Green (AUS)			Bye	
Round 2
1	Craig Green (AUS)	1-3 PP	2-6	Marc Mongeon (CAN)	0
2	Fitzlloyd Walker (GBR)	1-3 PP	4-7	Naomi Higuchi (JPN)	1
0	Rajinder Singh (IND)	3-1 PP	4-3	Mohamed Zayar (SYR)	2
0	Houkreo Bambe (CMR)	3.5-0 PS	1:58	Oscar Strático (ARG)	2
1	Seidu Olawale (NGR)	0-4 TF	2:20	Martin Knosp (FRG)	0
1	Kyriakos Bogiatzis (GRE)			Bye	
Round 3
1	Kyriakos Bogiatzis (GRE)	3-1 PP	4-2	Craig Green (AUS)	2
1	Marc Mongeon (CAN)	.5-3.5 SP	3-11	Naomi Higuchi (JPN)	1
0	Rajinder Singh (IND)	3-1 PP	6-2	Seidu Olawale (NGR)	2
1	Houkreo Bambe (CMR)	0-4 TF	1:08	Martin Knosp (FRG)	0
Round 4
2	Kyriakos Bogiatzis (GRE)	0-4 ST	0-12	Marc Mongeon (CAN)	1
1	Naomi Higuchi (JPN)	4-0 TF	1:21	Houkreo Bambe (CMR)	2
1	Rajinder Singh (IND)	0-4 TF	1:31	Martin Knosp (FRG)	0
Round 5
2	Marc Mongeon (CAN)	0-3.5 SO	0-9	Rajinder Singh (IND)	1
2	Naomi Higuchi (JPN)	0-4 TF	1:20	Martin Knosp (FRG)	0

Wrestler	L	ER	CP
Martin Knosp (FRG)	0	-	20
Rajinder Singh (IND)	1	-	12.5
Naomi Higuchi (JPN)	2	5	11.5
Marc Mongeon (CAN)	2	5	11.5
Houkreo Bambe (CMR)	2	4	6.5
Kyriakos Bogiatzis (GRE)	2	4	3
Seidu Olawale (NGR)	2	3	4.5
Craig Green (AUS)	2	3	2
Fitzlloyd Walker (GBR)	2	2	1
Mohamed Zayar (SYR)	2	2	1
Oscar Strático (ARG)	2	2	0.5

=== Final round ===
	CP	TP	
5th place match
Han Myung-Woo (KOR)	1-3 PP	3-7	Naomi Higuchi (JPN)
Bronze medal match
Šaban Sejdiu (YUG)	3-1 PP	5-1	Rajinder Singh (IND)
Gold medal match
Dave Schultz (USA)	3-1 PP	4-1	Martin Knosp (FRG)

== Final standings ==
1. Dave Schultz (USA)
2. Martin Knosp (FRG)
3. Šaban Sejdiu (YUG)
4. Rajinder Singh (IND)
5. Naomi Higuchi (JPN)
6. Han Myung-Woo (KOR)
7. Marc Mongeon (CAN)
8. Pekka Rauhala (FIN)
