= Wrestling at the 1988 Summer Olympics – Men's Greco-Roman 74 kg =

Men's Greco-Roman 74 kg at the Games of the XXIV Olympiad
- Venue: Sangmu Gymnasium
- Dates: 19–21 September 1988
- Competitors: 19 from 19 nations

Medalists
1st place, gold medalist(s)		Kim Young-nam	South Korea
2nd place, silver medalist(s)		Daulet Turlykhanov	Soviet Union
3rd place, bronze medalist(s)		Józef Tracz	Poland

The men's Greco-Roman 74 kg at the 1988 Summer Olympics as part of the wrestling program were held at the Sangmu Gymnasium, Seongnam.

== Tournament results ==
The wrestlers are divided into 2 groups. The winner of each group decided by a double-elimination system.

Legend

- TF — Won by Fall
- SP — Won by Superiority, 12-14 points difference, the loser with points
- SO — Won by Superiority, 12-14 points difference, the loser without points
- ST — Won by Technical Superiority, 15 points difference
- PP — Won by Points, the loser with technical points
- PO — Won by Points, the loser without technical points
- P0 — Won by Passivity, scoring zero points
- P1 — Won by Passivity, while leading by 1-11 points
- PS — Won by Passivity, while leading by 12-14 points
- PA — Won by Opponent Injury
- DQ — Won by Forfeit
- DNA — Did not appear
- L — Losses
- ER — Round of Elimination
- CP — Classification Points
- TP — Technical Points

=== Eliminatory round ===
==== Group A ====
L		CP	TP		L
Round 1
0	Józef Tracz (POL)	3-1 PP	6-3	David Butler (USA)	1
1	Óscar Sánchez (ESP)	0-4 TF	2:40	Franc Podlesek (YUG)	0
0	Hiromichi Ito (JPN)	3-1 PP	8-4	Wei Qingkun (CHN)	1
1	Zouheir Al-Balah (SYR)	0-3 PO	0-8	Kim Young-nam (KOR)	0
0	Borislav Velichkov (BUL)	4-0 ST	16-0	Jean Manga (CMR)	1
Round 2
0	Józef Tracz (POL)	4-0 TF	1:51	Óscar Sánchez (ESP)	2
1	David Butler (USA)	2-0 P0	5:31	Franc Podlesek (YUG)	1
0	Hiromichi Ito (JPN)	3-0 P1	4:19	Zouheir Al-Balah (SYR)	2
2	Wei Qingkun (CHN)	0-3 PO	0-4	Borislav Velichkov (BUL)	0
0	Kim Young-Nam (KOR)	4-0 TF	1:49	Jean Manga (CMR)	2
Round 3
1	Józef Tracz (POL)	0-3 PO	0-5	Franc Podlesek (YUG)	1
1	David Butler (USA)	3-1 PP	6-2	Hiromichi Ito (JPN)	1
0	Kim Young-Nam (KOR)	3-1 PP	3-1	Borislav Velichkov (BUL)	1
Round 4
1	Józef Tracz (POL)	3-1 PP	4-1	Hiromichi Ito (JPN)	2
2	David Butler (USA)	0-3 PO	0-2	Kim Young-nam (KOR)	0
2	Franc Podlesek (YUG)	0-3 PO	0-1	Borislav Velichkov (BUL)	1
Final Round
Round 5
1	Józef Tracz (POL)	0-0 DQ	7:14	Kim Young-nam (KOR)	1
1	Borislav Velichkov (BUL)			Bye	
Round 6
2	Borislav Velichkov (BUL)	1-3 PP	4-5	Józef Tracz (POL)	1
1	Kim Young-nam (KOR)			Bye	

Wrestler	L	ER	CP	Tiebreaker
Kim Young-nam (KOR)	0	-	13	3
Józef Tracz (POL)	1	-	10	3
Borislav Velichkov (BUL)	1	-	11	2
Hiromichi Ito (JPN)	2	4	8	
Franc Podlesek (YUG)	2	4	7	
David Butler (USA)	2	4	6	
Wei Qingkun (CHN)	2	2	1	
Jean Manga (CMR)	2	2	0	
Óscar Sánchez (ESP)	2	2	0	
Zouheir Al-Balah (SYR)	2	2	0	

==== Group B ====
L		CP	TP		L
Round 1
0	Roger Tallroth (SWE)	3-1 PP	7-5	Jouko Salomäki (FIN)	1
0	Martial Mischler (FRA)	3-0 P1	4:13	Erhan Balcı (TUR)	1
1	Reza Andouz (IRI)	0-4 TF	2:06	Daulet Turlykhanov (URS)	0
1	Jaroslav Zeman (TCH)	1-3 PP	2-5	János Takács (HUN)	0
0	Abdelaziz Tahir (MAR)			Bye	
Round 2
1	Abdelaziz Tahir (MAR)	0-3 P1	3:27	Roger Tallroth (SWE)	0
2	Jouko Salomäki (FIN)	1-3 PP	3-4	Martial Mischler (FRA)	0
1	Erhan Balcı (TUR)	3-0 P1	4:10	Reza Andouz (IRI)	2
0	Daulet Turlykhanov (URS)	4-0 TF	3:24	Jaroslav Zeman (TCH)	2
0	János Takács (HUN)			Bye	
Round 3
0	János Takács (HUN)	3-1 PP	7-1	Abdelaziz Tahir (MAR)	2
1	Roger Tallroth (SWE)	1-3 PP	2-3	Martial Mischler (FRA)	0
2	Erhan Balcı (TUR)	0-3 P1	2:27	Daulet Turlykhanov (URS)	0
Round 4
1	János Takács (HUN)	0-3 P1	4:38	Roger Tallroth (SWE)	1
1	Martial Mischler (FRA)	0-4 TF	4:30	Daulet Turlykhanov (URS)	0
Round 5
1	János Takács (HUN)	3-1 PP	4-1	Martial Mischler (FRA)	2
2	Roger Tallroth (SWE)	0-3 P1	5:04	Daulet Turlykhanov (URS)	0
Round 6
2	János Takács (HUN)	0-3 PO	0-10	Daulet Turlykhanov (URS)	0

Wrestler	L	ER	CP
Daulet Turlykhanov (URS)	0	-	21
János Takács (HUN)	2	6	9
Martial Mischler (FRA)	2	5	10
Roger Tallroth (SWE)	2	5	10
Erhan Balcı (TUR)	2	3	3
Abdelaziz Tahir (MAR)	2	3	1
Jouko Salomäki (FIN)	2	2	2
Jaroslav Zeman (TCH)	2	2	1
Reza Andouz (IRI)	2	2	0

=== Final round ===
	CP	TP	
7th place match
Hiromichi Ito (JPN)	1-3 PP	1-5	Roger Tallroth (SWE)
5th place match
Borislav Velichkov (BUL)	1-3 PP	1-4	Martial Mischler (FRA)
Bronze medal match
Józef Tracz (POL)	3-0 PO	2-0	János Takács (HUN)
Gold medal match
Kim Young-nam (KOR)	3-1 PP	2-1	Daulet Turlykhanov (URS)

== Final standings ==
1. Kim Young-nam (KOR)
2. Daulet Turlykhanov (URS)
3. Józef Tracz (POL)
4. János Takács (HUN)
5. Martial Mischler (FRA)
6. Borislav Velichkov (BUL)
7. Roger Tallroth (SWE)
8. Hiromichi Ito (JPN)
