= Wrestling at the 1980 Summer Olympics – Men's freestyle 68 kg =

Men's freestyle 68 kg at the Games of the XXII Olympiad
- Venue: Central Sports Club of the Army
- Dates: 29–31 July 1980
- Competitors: 18 from 18 nations

Medalists
1st place, gold medalist(s)		Saipulla Absaidov	Soviet Union
2nd place, silver medalist(s)		Ivan Yankov	Bulgaria
3rd place, bronze medalist(s)		Šaban Sejdiu	Yugoslavia

The Men's Freestyle 68 kg at the 1980 Summer Olympics as part of the wrestling program were held at the Athletics Fieldhouse, Central Sports Club of the Army.

== Tournament results ==
The competition used a form of negative points tournament, with negative points given for any result short of a fall. Accumulation of 6 negative points eliminated the loser wrestler. When only three wrestlers remain, a special final round is used to determine the order of the medals.

Legend

- TF — Won by Fall
- IN — Won by Opponent Injury
- DQ — Won by Passivity
- D1 — Won by Passivity, the winner is passive too
- D2 — Both wrestlers lost by Passivity
- FF — Won by Forfeit
- DNA — Did not appear
- TPP — Total penalty points
- MPP — Match penalty points

Penalties

- 0 — Won by Fall, Technical Superiority, Passivity, Injury and Forfeit
- 0.5 — Won by Points, 8-11 points difference
- 1 — Won by Points, 1-7 points difference
- 2 — Won by Passivity, the winner is passive too
- 3 — Lost by Points, 1-7 points difference
- 3.5 — Lost by Points, 8-11 points difference
- 4 — Lost by Fall, Technical Superiority, Passivity, Injury and Forfeit

=== Round 1 ===
TPP	MPP		Score		MPP	TPP
3	3	Jagmander Singh (IND)	2 - 9	Zevegiin Oidov (MGL)	1	1
4	4	Nguyễn Ðình Chi (VIE)	TF / 1:44	János Kocsis (HUN)	0	0
3.5	3.5	Pekka Rauhala (FIN)	5 - 13	José Ramos (CUB)	0.5	0.5
4	4	Zsigmond Kelevitz (AUS)	DQ / 5:38	Šaban Sejdiu (YUG)	0	0
0	0	Ivan Yankov (BUL)	15 - 1	Oscar Segers (BEL)	4	4
0	0	Eberhard Probst (GDR)	TF / 1:18	Victor Koulaigue (CMR)	4	4
4	4	Stanisław Chiliński (POL)	TF / 5:34	Saipulla Absaidov (URS)	0	0
4	4	Said Admane (ALG)	DQ / 8:36	Octavian Duşa (ROU)	0	0
4	4	Mazen Tuleimat (SYR)	DQ / 5:18	Ali Hussain Faris (IRQ)	0	0

=== Round 2 ===
TPP	MPP		Score		MPP	TPP
3	0	Jagmander Balyan Singh (IND)	TF / 2:17	Nguyen Dinh Chi (VIE)	4	8
2	1	Zevegiin Oidov (MGL)	7 - 4	János Kocsis (HUN)	3	3
4.5	1	Pekka Rauhala (FIN)	9 - 2	Zsigmond Kelevitz (AUS)	3	7
3.5	3	José Ramos (CUB)	3 - 10	Šaban Sejdiu (YUG)	1	1
0.5	0.5	Ivan Yankov (BUL)	11 - 3	Eberhard Probst (GDR)	3.5	3.5
4	0	Oscar Segers (BEL)	IN	Victor Koulaigue (CMR)	4	8
4	0	Stanisław Chiliński (POL)	TF / 7:16	Said Admane (ALG)	4	8
0	0	Saipulla Absaidov (URS)	TF / 4:29	Mazen Tuleimat (SYR)	4	8
0	0	Octavian Duşa (ROU)	TF / 4:38	Ali Hussain Faris (IRQ)	4	4

=== Round 3 ===
TPP	MPP		Score		MPP	TPP
3	0	Jagmander Balyan Singh (IND)	13 - 1	János Kocsis (HUN)	4	7
5	3	Zevegiin Oidov (MGL)	12 - 13	Pekka Rauhala (FIN)	1	5.5
7	3.5	José Ramos (CUB)	3 - 11	Ivan Yankov (BUL)	0.5	1
1	0	Šaban Sejdiu (YUG)	TF / 3:22	Oscar Segers (BEL)	4	8
3.5	0	Eberhard Probst (GDR)	TF / 7:14	Stanisław Chiliński (POL)	4	8
0	0	Saipulla Absaidov (URS)	TF / 5:59	Octavian Duşa (ROU)	4	4
4		Ali Hussain Faris (IRQ)		Bye		

=== Round 4 ===
TPP	MPP		Score		MPP	TPP
8	4	Ali Hussain Faris (IRQ)	1 - 19	Jagmander Balyan Singh (IND)	0	3
9.5	4	Pekka Rauhala (FIN)	TF / 3:18	Šaban Sejdiu (YUG)	0	1
4	3	Ivan Yankov (BUL)	1 - 6	Saipulla Absaidov (URS)	1	1
4.5	1	Eberhard Probst (GDR)	6 - 3	Octavian Duşa (ROU)	3	7
5		Zevegiin Oidov (MGL)		DNA		

=== Round 5 ===
TPP	MPP		Score		MPP	TPP
6	3	Jagmander Balyan Singh (IND)	7 - 11	Ivan Yankov (BUL)	1	5
2	1	Šaban Sejdiu (YUG)	6 - 2	Eberhard Probst (GDR)	3	7.5
1		Saipulla Absaidov (URS)		Bye		

=== Final ===
Results from the preliminary round are carried forward into the final (shown in yellow).

TPP	MPP		Score		MPP	TPP
	3	Ivan Yankov (BUL)	1 - 6	Saipulla Absaidov (URS)	1	
1	0	Saipulla Absaidov (URS)	TF / 7:45	Šaban Sejdiu (YUG)	4	
4	1	Ivan Yankov (BUL)	6 - 2	Šaban Sejdiu (YUG)	3	7

== Final standings ==
1. Saipulla Absaidov (URS)
2. Ivan Yankov (BUL)
3. Šaban Sejdiu (YUG)
4. Jagmander Balyan Singh (IND)
5. Eberhard Probst (GDR)
6. Octavian Duşa (ROU)
7. Ali Hussain Faris (IRQ)
8. Pekka Rauhala (FIN)
