= Matzen (disambiguation) =

Matzen is a town in the commune of Matzen-Raggendorf in Austria.

Matzen may also refer to:

- Matzen oil field in Austria
- Schloss Matzen Castle in (Reith im Alpbachtal) Tyrol, Austria
- Matzen-Raggendorf in Niederösterreich
- Henning Matzen, (1840–1910) Danish politician
