= Montvale =

Montvale may refer to:

== Places ==
- Montvale (Worcester, Massachusetts), a historic district
- Montvale, an unincorporated community in Middlesex County, Massachusetts, near Woburn
- Montvale, New Jersey, a borough in Bergen County
  - Montvale (NJT station)
- Montvale, Virginia, a census-designated place in Bedford County, Virginia

== Other uses ==
- Montvale, the Intel codename of an Itanium processor
- Montvale Hotel, a hotel in Spokane, Washington
- Montvale Public Schools
