= Constituency No. 1 (Kazakhstan) =

- Kazakh: №1 сайлау округі Russian: Избирательный округ №1
- Former Single-mandate constituency for the Mäjilis
- District: Almaty and Baiqonyr
- City: Astana
- Population: 600,006 (2023)

Former constituency
- Created: 2004; 2022 (re-established)
- Abolished: 2026
- Seats: 1
- Party: Amanat
- Deputy: Däulet Turlyhanov
- Created from: Aqmola
- Elected: 2023

The Constituency No. 1 (Kazakh: №1 сайлау округі, romanized: №1 sailau okrugı; Russian: Избирательный округ №1) was a single-mandate electoral district in Kazakhstan, represented in the lower chamber Mäjilis of the Parliament. It was located in the capital city of Astana and included the districts of Almaty and Baiqonyr.

The constituency was originally formed for the 2004 legislative election and existed until being abolished in 2007. It was reestablished in 2022 and represented by deputy Däulet Turlyhanov (Amanat) until being abolished in 2026.

== Geography ==
Constituency No. 1 was situated in the northwestern part of Astana and included the city districts of Almaty and Baiqonyr. The constituency shared borders with No. 9 (Akmola Region) to the northwest and No. 2 (Astana) to the southeast.

== History ==
The Constituency No. 1 was formed for the 2004 legislative election as a result of redistribution within the boundaries of Astana, and Beken Älimjanov served as the representative of the constituency. From there, the electoral district continued to exist until its dissolution following the 2007 constitutional amendment, which led to the abolition of all constituencies as part of the transition from a mixed-member majoritarian representation to a fully party-list proportional representation system. The change affected the composition of all seats in the lower chamber Mäjilis of the Kazakh Parliament beginning with the 2007 legislative election.

On 24 December 2022, the Constituency No. 1 was reestablished by the Central Election Commission, which came into effect on 1 January 2023 as a result of the 2022 amendment. The adoption of this amendment marked the reintroduction of a mixed electoral system for electing Mäjilis deputies, with the use of numbered constituencies being reinstated for the first time since 2004. It returned in the 2023 legislative election, with Däulet Turlyhanov becoming its elected representative.

== Members ==
Election	Member	Party	%
2004	Beken Älimjanov	Otan	52.1
2007	Defunct constituency (Nationwide PR)		
2012	Defunct constituency (Nationwide PR)		
2016	Defunct constituency (Nationwide PR)		
2021	Defunct constituency (Nationwide PR)		
2023	Däulet Turlyhanov	Amanat	47.0

== Election results ==
=== 2023 ===
2023 legislative election: Constituency No. 1
Party	Candidate	Votes	%
Amanat	Däulet Turlyhanov	71,698	47.03
Independent	Täñirbergen Berdoñğar	17,079	11.20
Independent	Uälihan Qaisarov	6,141	4.03
Independent	Qurmanğazy Rahmetov	4,592	3.01
Independent	Batyr Äliev	4,569	3.00
Independent	Sultan Han Aqqululy	3,637	2.39
Astana City Veterans of the Nagorno-Karabakh conflict	Ernur Äzimbaev	3,585	2.35
Independent	Säbit Rysbaev	3,097	2.03
Independent	Batyr Seikenov	2,865	1.88
Independent	Kim Veronika	2,651	1.74
Independent	Ardaq Otorbaev	2,363	1.55
Independent	Güljamal Baymenova	2,193	1.44
Independent	Bağdat Muratia	2,090	1.37
Independent	Yuliya Goyko	2,064	1.36
Independent	Jumart Shamşi	1,716	1.13
Independent	Ernur Jumataev	1,534	1.01
Independent	Qayrat Elubayev	1,857	1.22
Independent	Janat Abylkaev	1,214	0.80
Independent	Aynur Dandibaeva	1,197	0.79
Independent	Andrei Avdeev	1,097	0.72
Independent	Jangeldi Bekbatyrov	916	0.60
Independent	Älim Naimanqulova	798	0.52
Independent	Jasulan Isa	397	0.26
Independent	Dostyq Kamelov	587	0.39
Independent	Aynagul Janalieva	593	0.39
Independent	Aitilbek Kaliptanov	359	0.24
Independent	Jenis Karabaev	453	0.30
Independent	Nurjanbek Koyliev	373	0.25
Independent	Alik Mandirov	398	0.26
Independent	Baurjan Moldakmet	359	0.24
Independent	Azamat Mukyshev	347	0.23
Independent	Arman Sadyakasov	351	0.23
Independent	Sabit Rysbaev	393	0.26
Independent	Berik Keshikbaev	401	0.26
Independent	Maiya Ibrayeva	319	0.21
Against all		6,279	4.12
Total valid votes		152,437	98.27
Invalid or blank votes		2,691	1.73
Total votes		155,128	100
Majority		54,619	35.83
Amanat win			
