= 1986 Yasar Dogu Tournament =

Yasar Dogu 1986
- Host city: İzmir, Turkey
- Dates: 16–17 September 1986

The Yasar Dogu Tournament 1986, was a wrestling event held in İzmir, Turkey between 16 and 17 September 1986. This tournament was held as 14th. There was no international participation in this tournament.

This international tournament includes competition includes competition in men's freestyle wrestling. This ranking tournament was held in honor of the two time Olympic Champion, Yaşar Doğu.

== Medal overview ==
=== Men's freestyle ===
Event	Gold	Silver	Bronze
48 kg	Mehmet Hafızoğlu; Turkey	Mustafa Öcal; Turkey	Fevzi Kaynak; Turkey
52 kg	Metin Topaktaş; Turkey	Hamza Eroğlu; Turkey	Göksel Teke; Turkey
57 kg	Ahmet Ak; Turkey	Metin Kaplan; Turkey	Ahmet Durna; Turkey
62 kg	Yüksel Dönmez; Turkey	Mustafa Yeni; Turkey	Halit Akgün; Turkey
68 kg	Rahmi Harunoğlu; Turkey	Hasan İmamoğlu; Turkey	Mustafa Aşan; Turkey
74 kg	Selahattin Sağan; Turkey	Abdurrahim Yalçın; Turkey	Ertuğrul Çolakoğlu; Turkey
82 kg	Necmi Gençalp; Turkey	Erol Yıldırım; Turkey	Şenol Tenekecioğlu; Turkey
90 kg	Hamit Kartal; Turkey	Nevzat Altınoluk; Turkey	Faruk Oral; Turkey
100 kg	Mustafa Teke; Turkey	Nafiz Nazlı; Turkey	
130 kg	Hayri Sezgin; Turkey	Arif Çetin; Turkey	Mustafa Vedat; Turkey
