= Craig Green (wrestler) =

Australian wrestler

Personal information
- Nationality: Australian
- Born: 30 June 1964 (age 62)

Sport
- Sport: Wrestling

Craig Andrew Green (born 30 June 1964) is an Australian wrestler. He competed in the men's freestyle 74 kg at the 1984 Summer Olympics.
