= Kim Young-nam =

South Korean Greco-Roman wrestler

- Hangul: 김영남
- Hanja: 金永南
- RR: Gim Yeongnam
- MR: Kim Yŏngnam

Kim Young-nam
Medal record

Men's Greco-Roman wrestling

Representing South Korea

Olympic Games
| Gold medal – first place | 1988 Seoul | 74 kg |

Asian Games
| Gold medal – first place | 1986 Seoul | 74 kg |

Kim Young-nam (Korean: 김영남; Hanja: 金永南; born June 15, 1960) is a retired South Korean Greco-Roman wrestler and Olympic champion. He was born in Hampyeong, South Jeolla Province, South Korea.

== Career ==
Kim was a volleyball player before opting for wrestling, in high school. In the 1984 Summer Olympics held in Los Angeles, Kim finished 4th in the welterweight class of Greco-Roman wrestling, losing to 1980 Olympic gold medalist Ștefan Rusu of Romania in the bronze medal match.

Kim received a gold medal at the 1988 Summer Olympics in Seoul.

He retired from wrestling after the 1988 Olympics, and participated in the 1996 Summer Olympics as an assistant coach of the South Korean national wrestling team. He has resided in Kazakhstan since 1997, running his own construction company.
