= Oscar Segers =

Belgian wrestler

Personal information
- Nationality: Belgian
- Born: 3 October 1960 (age 65)

Sport
- Sport: Wrestling

Oscar Segers (born 3 October 1960) is a Belgian wrestler. He competed in the men's freestyle 68 kg at the 1980 Summer Olympics.
