= Octavian Dușa =

Romanian wrestler

Personal information
- Nationality: Romanian
- Born: 24 December 1954 (age 71)

Sport
- Sport: Wrestling

Octavian Dușa (born 24 December 1954) is a Romanian wrestler. He competed in the men's freestyle 68 kg at the 1980 Summer Olympics.
