= Victor Koulaigue =

Cameroonian wrestler

Personal information
- Nationality: Cameroonian

Sport
- Sport: Wrestling

Victor Koulaigue is a Cameroonian wrestler. He competed in the men's freestyle 68 kg at the 1980 Summer Olympics.
