= David Butler (wrestler) =

American wrestler (born 1957)

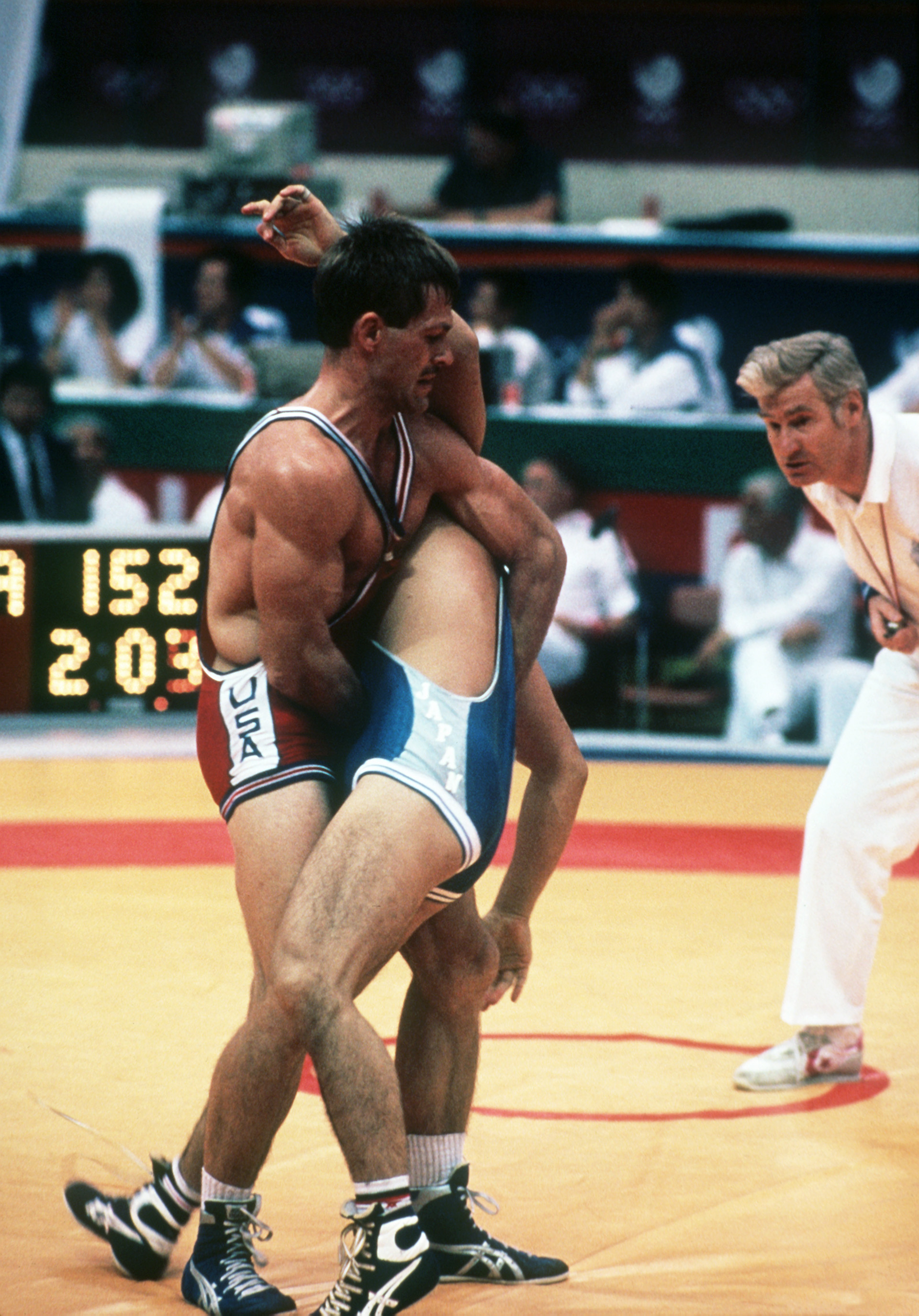
- Butler (red) in 1988

Personal information
- Born: September 14, 1957 (age 68) Muncie, Indiana, U.S.

Sport
- Country: United States
- Sport: Wrestling
- Weight class: 74 kg
- Event: Greco-Roman
- Club: U.S. Navy
- Team: USA
Medal record
Men's Greco-Roman wrestling
Representing the United States
Pan American Games
Gold medal – first place	1987 Indianapolis	74 kg
Silver medal – second place	1991 Havana	74 kg

David Butler (born September 14, 1957) is an American wrestler. He competed in the men's Greco-Roman 74 kg at the 1988 Summer Olympics.
