= Borislav Velichkov =

Bulgarian wrestler

Personal information
- Nationality: Bulgarian
- Born: 30 May 1961 (age 65) Novi Iskar, Bulgaria

Sport
- Sport: Wrestling

Borislav Velichkov (born 30 May 1961) is a Bulgarian wrestler. He competed in the men's Greco-Roman 74 kg at the 1988 Summer Olympics.
