= Saypulla Absaidov =

Soviet wrestler (born 1958)

Medal record

Men's freestyle wrestling

Representing Soviet Union

Olympic Games
Gold medal – first place	1980 Moscow	68 kg

World Championships
Gold medal – first place	1981 Skopje	68 kg

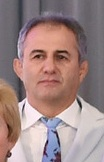
Image of Saypulla Absaidov

Saypulla Atavovich Absaidov (Kumyk: Sayfullah Absaid Atawnu ulanı; born 14 July 1958 ) is a former wrestler of Kumyk descent and Olympic champion and World Champion 1981 in Freestyle wrestling who competed for the USSR. He was born in Tarki, Dagestan ASSR.

== Olympics ==
Absaidov competed at the 1980 Summer Olympics in Moscow where he received a gold medal in Freestyle wrestling, the lightweight class.
