= Zouheir Al-Balah =

Syrian wrestler

Personal information
- Nationality: Syrian
- Born: 1 July 1967 (age 59)

Sport
- Sport: Wrestling

Zouheir Al-Balah (Arabic: زهير البلح; born 1 July 1967) is a Syrian wrestler. He competed in the men's Greco-Roman 74 kg at the 1988 Summer Olympics, and lost both of his matches.
