= Zane Coleman =

New Zealand wrestler

Personal information
- Nationality: New Zealand
- Born: 24 December 1960 (age 65)

Sport
- Sport: Wrestling

Zane Murray Coleman (born 24 December 1960) is a New Zealand wrestler. He competed in the men's freestyle 74 kg at the 1984 Summer Olympics.
