= Seidu Olawale =

Nigerian wrestler

Personal information
- Nationality: Nigerian
- Born: 12 April 1962 (age 64)

Sport
- Sport: Wrestling

Seidu Olawale (born 12 April 1962) is a Nigerian wrestler. He competed in the men's freestyle 74 kg at the 1984 Summer Olympics.
