= Franc Podlesek =

Slovenian wrestler

Personal information
- Nationality: Slovenian
- Born: 13 July 1952 (age 74) Ljubljana, Yugoslavia

Sport
- Sport: Wrestling

Franc Podlesek (born 13 July 1952) is a Slovenian wrestler. He competed in the men's Greco-Roman 74 kg at the 1988 Summer Olympics.
