= Houkreo Bambe =

Cameroonian wrestler

Personal information
- Nationality: Cameroonian

Sport
- Sport: Wrestling

Houkreo Bambe is a Cameroonian wrestler. He competed in the men's freestyle 74 kg at the 1984 Summer Olympics.
