= Hiromichi Ito =

Japanese wrestler (born 1963)

Personal information
- Full name: 伊藤広道 Itō Hiromichi
- Nationality: Japanese
- Born: 1 November 1963 (age 62)

Sport
- Sport: Wrestling

Hiromichi Ito (born 1 November 1963) is a Japanese wrestler. He competed in the men's Greco-Roman 74 kg at the 1988 Summer Olympics.
