= Matzen =

- Market town
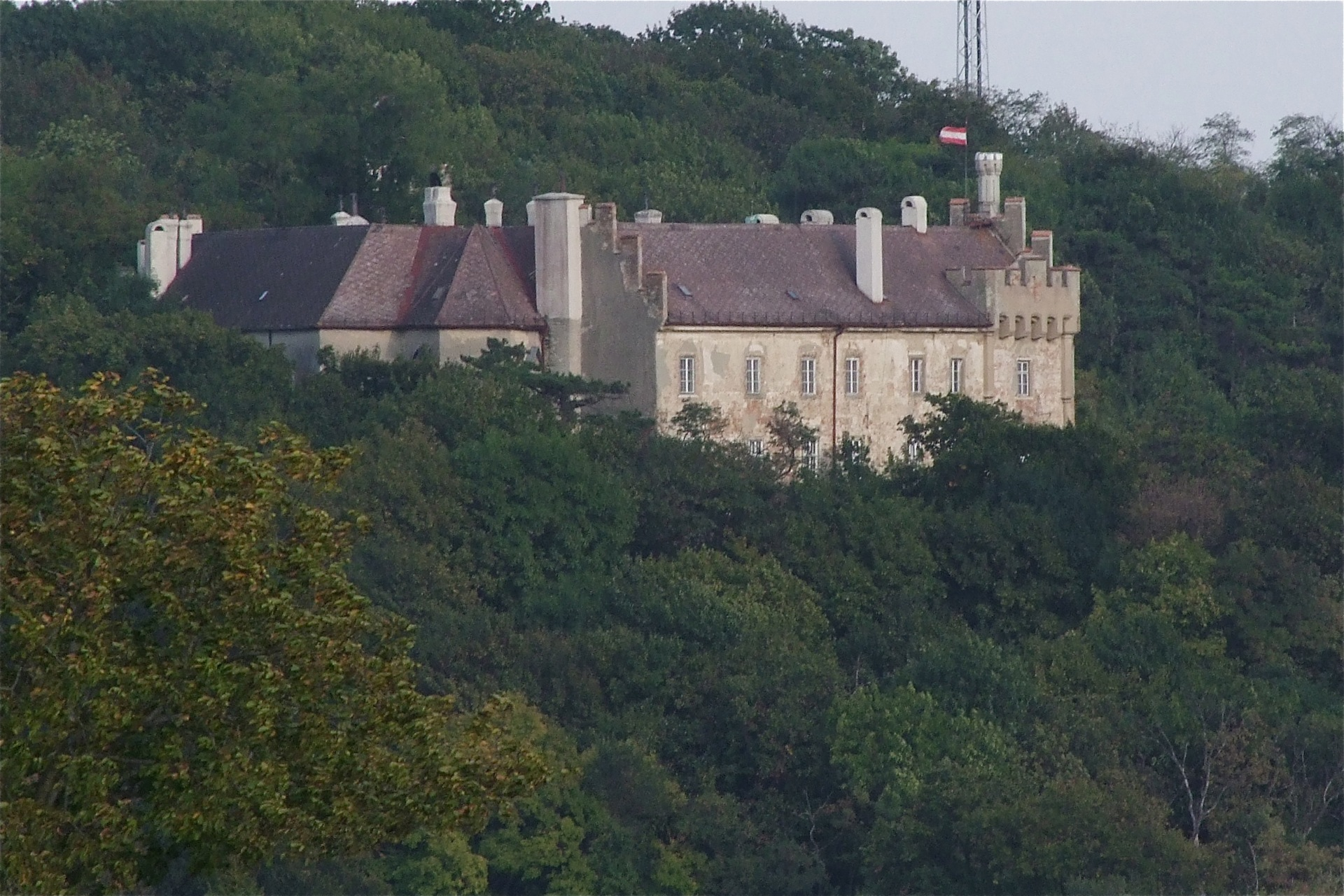
- Matzen castle

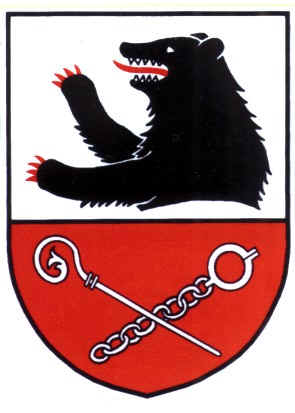
- Coat of arms

- Location within Austria
- Coordinates: 48°24′4″N 16°41′40″E
- Country: Austria
- State: Lower Austria
- District: Gänserndorf
- Commune: Matzen-Raggendorf
- First mentioned: 1194
- Time zone: UTC+1 (CET)
  - Summer (DST): UTC+2 (CEST)
- Postal code: 2243

Matzen is a town in the commune of Matzen-Raggendorf, in the Gänserndorf District of the state of Lower Austria, Austria
