= Óscar Sánchez (wrestler) =

Spanish wrestler

Personal information
- Nationality: Spanish
- Born: 13 January 1967 (age 59) Dénia, Spain

Sport
- Sport: Wrestling

Óscar Sánchez (born 13 January 1967) is a Spanish wrestler. He competed in the men's Greco-Roman 74 kg at the 1988 Summer Olympics.
