= Däulet Turlyhanov =

Kazakhstani wrestler

Däulet Turlykhanov
- Дәулет Тұрлыханов
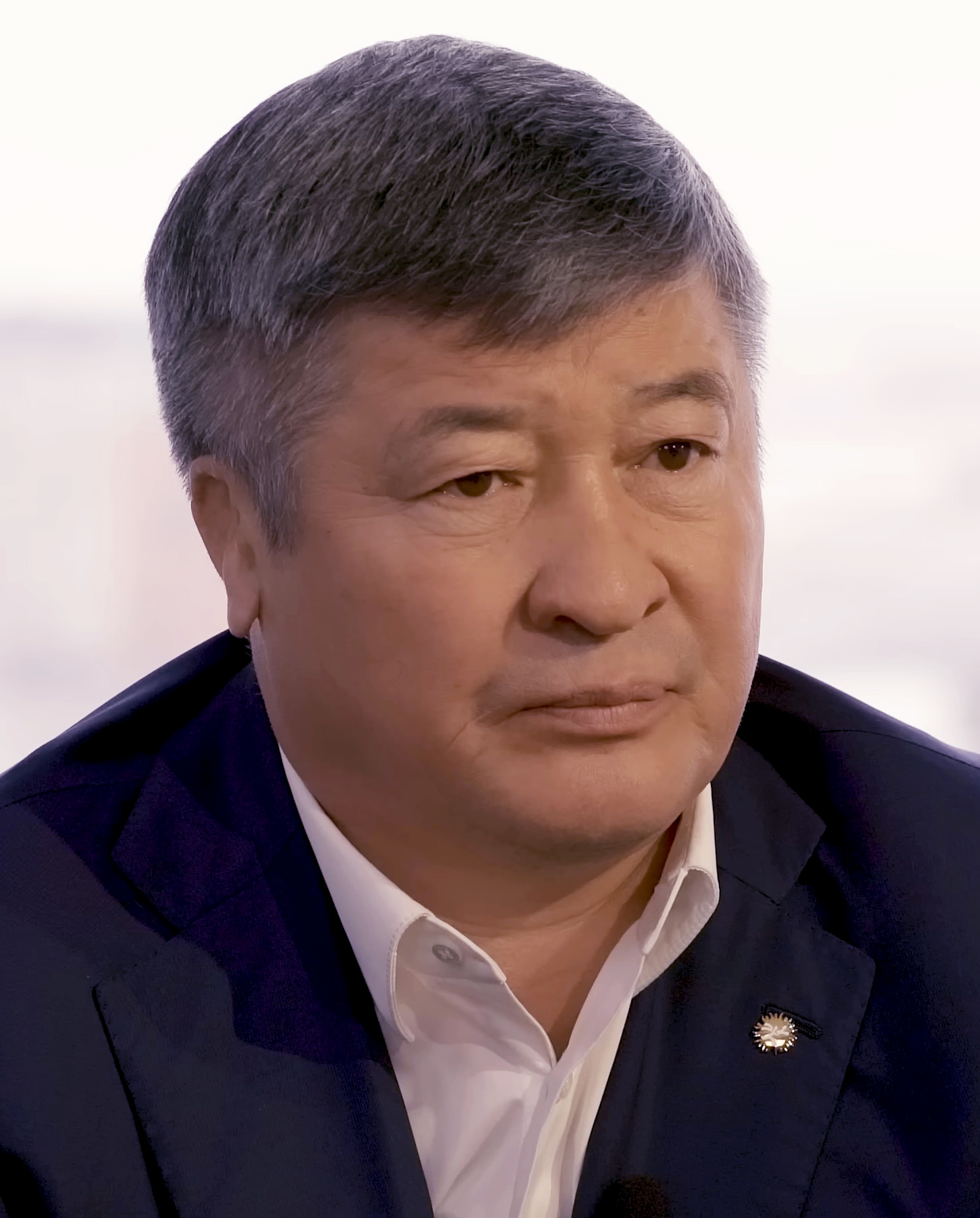
- Turlyhanov in 2023

Member of the Mäjilis
- In office 29 March 2023 – 1 July 2026
- Preceded by: Constituency reestablished; Beken Älimjanov (2007)
- Constituency: Astana, No. 1
- In office 30 January 1996 – May 2000
- Preceded by: Constituency established
- Succeeded by: Tölen Toqtasynov
- Constituency: North-East (1996–1999); South-West (1999–2000)

Member of the Supreme Council of Kazakhstan
- In office 19 April 1994 – 11 March 1995
- Preceded by: Constituency established
- Succeeded by: Constituency abolished
- Constituency: Ürjar

Personal details
- Born: 18 November 1963 (age 63) Geogrievka, Kazakh SSR, Soviet Union
- Party: Amanat (2003–present)
- Children: 6
- Parent(s): Bolat Turlyhanov; Märzia Turlyhanova
- Education: Kazakh Institute of Physical Culture
- Sports career
Medal record
Men's freestyle wrestling
Representing the Soviet Union
Olympic Games
Silver medal – second place	1988 Seoul	74 kg
Representing the Unified Team
Bronze medal – third place	1992 Barcelona	82 kg
World Championships
Gold medal – first place	1989 Martigny	Welterweight
Silver medal – second place	1993 Stockholm	Middleweight
Bronze medal – third place	1987 Clermont-Ferrand	Welterweight

Däulet Bolatuly Turlykhanov (Kazakh: Дәулет Болатұлы Тұрлыханов, Däulet Bolatulı Turlıxanov, romanized: Däulet Bolatūly Tūrlyhanov; born 18 November 1963) is a Kazakh politician and former wrestler who is serving as member of the Mäjilis since 2023 and previously from 1996 to 2000. He is known for having competed in the 1988, 1992, and the 1996 Summer Olympics for men's freestyle wrestling.

== Early life and education ==
Turlyhanov was born in the village of Geogrievka in Semey Region to the parents of Bolat Turlyhanov (1934–1993) and Märzia Turlyhanova (1940–2019). His father, Bolat, was a native of the city of Semey and a master of sports in Greco-Roman wrestling, who later became an Honored Coach of the Republic of Kazakhstan. His father's legacy lives on through an annual Greco-Roman wrestling tournament held in Semey as tribute since his death in 1994. Additionally, the Bolat Turlyhanov Cup has been held in Almaty since 2017. Furthermore, a street in the Semey bears his name, honoring his profound impact on Kazakh wrestling. Turlyhanov's mother, Marzia, was an esteemed figure as an Honored Teacher of the Kazakh SSR and an Honored Worker of Kazakhstan Education.

In 1989, Turlyhanov graduated from the Kazakh Institute of Physical Culture (now Kazakh Academy of Sports and Tourism) with a profession as a specialty physical education teacher-trainer. During the years 1995 to 1999, Turlyhanov pursued his legal education at the Kazakh State Academy of Sports and Tourism, specializing in law and obtaining a Candidate of Pedagogical Sciences. In 2004 and 2005, he furthered his academic journey at Al-Farabi Kazakh National University, earning a degree in law. Subsequently, from 2006 to 2010, Turlykhanov attended Jetisu State University, where he obtained a degree in economics.

== Wrestling career ==
Turlyhanov's athletic skills were amplified by his connection to his father, Bolat, who was a renowned Kazakh wrestler and later became an Honored Coach of the Republic. As a sixth grader, Turlyhanov was sent to a sports boarding school in Alma-Ata by his father. Merkejan Qoşaev, Turlyhanov's first coach in Greco-Roman wrestling at the boarding school, trained him into the path of his future wrestling career. In 1981, Turlyhanov graduated from a boarding school and was drafted into the Soviet Army, but continued training as Alexander Lebedev continued coaching Turlyhanov where he learned various special tricks, specifically boxing counterattacks. From 1985, Daulet was coached by Gennady Sapunov.

In 1989, Turlyhanov became the World Champion in 1989 and earned the title of Vice-World Champion in 1993. In addition, he clinched the European Championship in 1988 and the Asian Championship in 1995. Turlyhhanov's accomplishments also include winning a silver medal in the 1988 Summer Olympics and a bronze medal in the 1992 Summer Olympics. Although he narrowly missed the podium in the 1996 Summer Olympics, finishing in fourth place, his remarkable career earned him numerous accolades.

During his sporting journey, Turlyhanov secured eight championship titles in the Soviet Union and emerged victorious twice in the World Cup. He stood as a triumphant champion in the last Spartakiad of the Peoples of the USSR in 1991 and excelled at the 1994 Asian Games, where he claimed victory in 1994.

== Early political career ==
Outside the realm of sports, Turlyhanov ventured into politics. From 1986 to 1993, he served in the Committee of Physical Culture and Sports under the Council of Ministers of the Kazakh SSR as a sportsman's coach.

In the 1994 legislative election, he was elected as a deputy into the 12th convocation of the Supreme Council from the Ürjar constituency.

Following that, he assumed the role as the chairman of the Sports Committee under the Ministry of Culture, Information, and Sports from September 2004 to March 2006.

=== Mäjilis ===
==== Elections ====
===== 1995 =====
Following the dissolution of the Supreme Council of Kazakhstan which essentially led to a formation of the Mäjilis, Turlyhanov ran for reelection in 1995 from the North-East constituency, where he won 87.3% of the vote.

===== 1999 =====
In 1999, he was re-elected as deputy with 63.2% of the vote from the South-West constituency.

==== Tenure ====
In the beginning, Turlyhanov served as a deputy of the 1st (1996–1999) and 2nd (1999–2004) convocations of the Mäjilis, with his term being cut short, as he was appointed as chairman of the Agency of the Republic of Kazakhstan for Tourism and Sports in May 2000. His vacant seat was subsequently taken over following a by-election held in September of that year.

== Entrepreneurial, sports organization, and educational activities ==
After stepping down from the Sports Committee, Turlyhanov went on to hold various leadership roles, including serving as a bureau member for a prominent international sports organization and presiding over regional and national wrestling federations. He also engaged in entrepreneurial activities, founding his own corporation.

Turlyhanov's expertise and dedication were recognized nationally as he assumed the esteemed position of professor in the Department of Pedagogy under the Committee for Control in the Field of Education and Science of the Ministry of Education and Science in 2011. Furthermore, his passion for teaching and research led to him becoming a professor at the South Kazakhstan State Pedagogical Institute on 6 November 2014.

== Return to politics ==
=== Mäjilis ===
==== Elections ====
===== 2023 =====
In February 2023, Turlyhanov became a candidate for the Mäjilis electoral district No. 1 (Astana) from the ruling AMANAT party in the 2023 legislative election. Polls officially showed Turlyhanov holding an overwhelming lead against all candidates in the crowded race. The authenticity of the polling data received skepticism from one of his contestants, Sultanhan Aqqululy, who questioned the accuracy of the polling data by arguing that the sudden popularity of Turlyhanov, who had been absent from politics for the past 20 years, seemed implausible. During the campaign, it was reported that Turlyhanov's campaign fund amounted to approximately 30,050,000 tenge. In the official results, Turlyhanov emerged victorious with 71,698 votes (47.0%), defeating his closest independent runner-up, Täñirbergen Berdoñğar, who obtained 17,079 votes (11.0%).

Shortly after his win, Turlyhanov revealed that he had contemplated withdrawing from the race and that he actively engaged with constituents and institutions during election campaign, listening to their concerns and collecting statements and complaints about existing problems. The issues that emerged from these interactions included the lack of schools, hospitals, and challenges faced by mothers with many children, which Turlyhanov aimed to address during his term as a parliamentarian.

==== Tenure ====
After being elected to the 8th convocation of Mäjilis in March 2023, Turlyhanov became a member of the Committee on International Affairs, Defense and Security.

== Controversy ==
In the night of 10–11 February 2023, an incident involving one of Turlyhanov's son, Nurasyl, was reported after he was charged in allegedly assaulting the lawyers of Anna Dimitrievich and Oleg Chernov in Almaty. Following the news, Turlyhanov issued a public apology over Nurasyl's behavior on social media. In a further interview with Zakon.kz, Turlyhanov described his son's actions, expressing his dismay: "As you can imagine, it is not easy for me, like any parent, to hear all this."

== Criticism ==
In March 2023, an article published by Ulysmedia.kz linked Turlykhanov's successful career as an athlete and his aspirations for a deputy seat in the Mäjilis as part of "old Kazakhstan", in which "power and business were tightly connected structures." The article delved into his background as an Olympic medalist in Greco-Roman wrestling and his involvement in various business ventures. It also brought up past scandals involving Turlyhanov's sons and the controversies surrounding his popularity among the public.

== Other activities ==
=== Non-profits ===
- Daulet professional sports club, president (since 1992)
- Kazakhstan Greco-Roman, Freestyle and Women's Wrestling Federation, president (since 1992)
- United World Wrestling, bureau member (since 2006)
- Asian Wrestling Federation, president (since 2017)
- Federation of Greco-Roman, Freestyle and Women's Wrestling of the Republic of Kazakhstan, president (since 2021)

=== Corporate boards ===
- SemAZ, chairman of the board of directors (since 2006)
- Samruk-Kazyna, general director (2010–2012)
- Danake Corporation, founder (since 2012)

== Awards and honours ==
- 1998: Honorary Professor from Kazakh Institute of Physical Education.
- 2005: Academician from the Academy of Security, Defense, and Law Enforcement of the Russian Federation
- 2007: Doctorate from the Seoul Academy of Physical Education and Sports
- The Medal for Distinguished Labor (1994)
