= Ignacio Ordóñez (wrestler) =

Spanish wrestler

Personal information
- Nationality: Spanish
- Born: 22 February 1966
- Died: 7 October 2020 (aged 54)

Sport
- Sport: Wrestling

Ignacio Ordóñez (22 February 1966 – 7 October 2020) was a Spanish wrestler. He competed in the men's freestyle 74 kg at the 1984 Summer Olympics.
