= Marco Capozzoli =

American football player (born 1988)

No. 7
- Position: Kicker

Personal information
- Born: February 10, 1988 (age 38); Montvale, New Jersey, U.S.
- Listed height: 6 ft 1 in (1.85 m)
- Listed weight: 210 lb (95 kg)

Career information
- High school: Bloomfield (NJ) Saint Joseph
- College: Montclair State
- NFL draft: 2010: undrafted

Career history
- Tulsa Talons (2010); Jacksonville Sharks (2011–2013, 2016)

Awards and highlights
- ArenaBowl champion (2011)

Career AFL statistics
- FG made: 25
- FG att: 39
- PAT made: 397
- PAT att: 487
- Stats at ArenaFan.com

Marco Capozzoli (born February 10, 1988) is an American former football placekicker who played for the Tulsa Talons and Jacksonville Sharks of the Arena Football League (AFL). He was a placekicker for Montclair State University. He was signed as a free agent by the Jacksonville Sharks in 2010. Capozzoli has been a resident of Bloomfield, New Jersey.

== Early life ==
Capozzoli did not start playing football until his senior year at Saint Joseph Regional High School in Montvale, New Jersey.

== College career ==
Capozzoli played for the Montclair State Red Hawks from 2006 to 2009. He was named the Division III Outstanding Male Athlete of the Year by the Collegiate Athletic Administration of New Jersey his senior season. He was also named the NJAC Special Teams Player of the Year.

== Professional career ==
Capozzoli played in six games for the Tulsa Talons in 2010.

Capozzoli was assigned to the Jacksonville Sharks on October 21, 2010. He played for the Sharks from 2011 to 2013, winning ArenaBowl XXIV in 2011. On March 30, 2016, Capozzoli was assigned to the Sharks once again. On May 17, 2016, Capozzoli retired.
