= Martin Knosp =

German wrestler

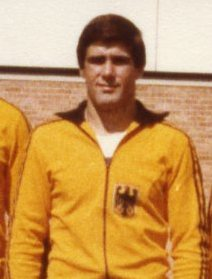

Medal record

Men's freestyle wrestling

Representing West Germany

Olympic Games
| Silver medal – second place | 1984 Los Angeles | welterweight |

Martin Knosp (born 7 October 1959 in Renchen) is a German former wrestler who competed in the 1984 Summer Olympics.
