= Shaban Sejdiu =

Macedonian freestyle wrestler (born 1959)

Personal information
- Born: 6 May 1959 (age 67) Blace, PR Macedonia, FPR Yugoslavia
Medal record
Men's Freestyle Wrestling
Representing Yugoslavia
Olympic Games
Bronze medal – third place	1980 Moscow	68 kg
Bronze medal – third place	1984 Los Angeles	74 kg
World Championships
Silver medal – second place	1977 Lausanne	68 kg
Silver medal – second place	1981 Skopje	68 kg
Mediterranean Games
Gold medal – first place	1975 Algiers	68 kg
Gold medal – first place	1979 Split	68 kg
Universiade
Bronze medal – third place	1977 Sofia	68 kg

Shaban Sejdiu (Macedonian: Шабан Сејдиу; born 6 May 1959) is a Macedonian Albanian retired freestyle wrestler.

An ethnic Macedonian Albanian, Sejdiu, as part of the Skopje Wrestling Club, was trained by notable coaches Risto Takov, who had also trained notable wrestlers Shaban Tërstena, Bajram Qorrolli, Abdulla Mehmeti, Mustaf Syla, Shend Kamberi and Adnan Elezi.

Sejdiu competed in the 1976 Summer Olympics, in the 1980 Summer Olympics, in the 1984 Summer Olympics, and in the 1988 Summer Olympics.

His daughter Altuna is a successful singer in North Macedonia and Albania.

Awards
Preceded by Matija Ljubek	(Socialist Federal Republic of Yugoslavia) The Best Athlete of Yugoslavia; 1977	Succeeded by Dražen Dalipagić
Preceded by Matija Ljubek	Yugoslav Sportsman of the Year; 1977	Succeeded by Dražen Dalipagić
