= Issam Awarke =

Lebanese wrestler

Personal information
- Nationality: Lebanese
- Born: 12 May 1960 (age 66)

Sport
- Sport: Wrestling

Issam Awarke (born 12 May 1960) is a Lebanese wrestler. He competed in the men's Greco-Roman 74 kg at the 1984 Summer Olympics.
