= Kyriakos Bogiatzis =

Greek wrestler

Personal information
- Nationality: Greek
- Born: 25 March 1956 (age 70)

Sport
- Sport: Wrestling

Kyriakos Bogiatzis (born 25 March 1956) is a Greek wrestler. He competed in the men's freestyle 74 kg at the 1984 Summer Olympics.
