= Mohammad Zayar =

Syrian wrestler

Personal information
- Nationality: Syrian
- Born: 11 March 1964 (age 62) Syria

Sport
- Sport: Wrestling

Mohammad Zayar (Arabic: محمد زيار; born 11 March 1964) is a Syrian wrestler. He competed in the men's freestyle 74 kg at the 1984 Summer Olympics.
