= Naomi Higuchi =

Japanese wrestler

Personal information
- Nationality: Japanese
- Born: 29 March 1961 (age 65)

Sport
- Sport: Wrestling

Naomi Higuchi (樋口 直巳, Higuchi Naomi; born 29 March 1961) is a Japanese wrestler. He competed in the men's freestyle 74 kg at the 1984 Summer Olympics.
