= Ivan Yankov =

Bulgarian wrestler

Medal record

Men's freestyle wrestling

Representing Bulgaria

Olympic Games
| Silver medal – second place | 1980 Moskva | lightweight |

European Championships
| Gold medal – first place | 1973 Losanna | 62 kg |
| Gold medal – first place | 1975 Ludwigshafen | 62 kg |
| Gold medal – first place | 1978 Sofia | 68 kg |

Ivan Yankov (Bulgarian: Иван Янков; born 7 June 1951) is a Bulgarian former wrestler who competed in the 1976 Summer Olympics and in the 1980 Summer Olympics.
