= Matzen oil field =

Oilfield in Vienna Basin, Austria

Matzen
- Country: Austria
- Region: Vienna Basin
- Offshore/onshore: onshore
- Operator: OMV

Field history
- Discovery: 1949
- Start of production: 1949

Production
- Estimated oil in place: 68.5 million tonnes (~ 81×10^{6} m^{3} or 510 million bbl)
- Estimated gas in place: 30×10^{9} m^{3} 1,000×10^{9} cu ft

The Matzen oil field is an oil field located in Vienna Basin. It was discovered in 1949 and developed by the Soviet-administered predecessor to OMV. It began production in 1949 and produces oil. The total proven reserves of the Matzen oil field are around 510 million barrels (68.5 million tonnes), and production is centered on 12,300 barrels per day (1,960 m^{3}/d).
