= Mazenod =

Mazenod can refer to the following:

== People ==
- Charles-Joseph-Eugene de Mazenod, the founder of the Missionary Oblates of Mary Immaculate and patron saint of dysfunctional families

== Places ==
- Mazenod, Lesotho, a town in Lesotho
- Mazenod, Saskatchewan, a dissolved village in Canada

== Schools ==
- Mazenod College, Victoria, Mulgrave, Australia
- Mazenod College, Western Australia, Lesmurdie, Australia
