= Jouko Salomäki =

Finnish wrestler (born 1962)

Personal information
- Full name: Jouko Johannes Salomäki
- Born: 26 August 1962 (age 63) Kauhajoki, Finland
Medal record
Men's Greco-Roman wrestling
Representing Finland
Olympic Games
Gold medal – first place	1984 Los Angeles	74 kg
World Championships
Bronze medal – third place	1985 Kolbotn	74 kg
Gold medal – first place	1987 Clermand-Ferrand	74 kg

Jouko Johannes Salomäki (born 26 August 1962 in Kauhajoki) is a Finnish wrestler and Olympic champion in Greco-Roman wrestling. He was nicknamed "Jokke" during his career.

Salomäki competed at the 1984 Summer Olympics in Los Angeles where he received the gold medal in Greco-Roman wrestling, in the welterweight class. Salomäki won the World Championship in the same weight class in 1987.
