= Mazen al-Tumeizi =

Mazen al-Tumeizi (Arabic: مازن الطميزي also transliterated Mazen Tumesi, c. July 5, 1979 – September 12, 2004) was a Palestinian journalist, killed on-camera in Baghdad, Iraq by U.S. helicopter gunfire while covering the Haifa Street helicopter incident. He was the 20th journalist killed in Iraq in 2004, and the third from Al Arabiya.

Tumeizi, a Palestinian reporter, was covering a group of Iraqis ululating around the wreckage of a U.S. Bradley Fighting Vehicle that had been recently abandoned after suffering damage from an improvised roadside bomb attack. A loud explosion can then be heard, followed by layers of smoke and debris. Tumeizi collapses from the impact, falling toward the camera, and the camera's lens is spattered with his blood as he falls. The cameraman (identified by Tumeizi as "Seif") loses focus, but Tumeizi's last words are captured in the camera's audio feed: I'm going to die. I'm going to die. Seif. Seif. I'm going to die. "Seif" would later be identified as Reuters camera operator Seif Fouad, who was also injured in a subsequent rocket strike.

== Reactions ==
International news agencies reported that Tumeizi began filming the abandoned vehicle's location three hours after it had been ambushed, a claim disputed by the U.S. military. The official military report places the time of the helicopter strike only 40 minutes after the Bradley being ambushed, and states that the airstrike on the wrecked Bradley was called "to prevent looting and harm to the Iraqi people."

Tumeizi's colleague, Najwa Qassem, contrasted the US response in this killing to that of two other Al Arabiya reporters. She said that in the first two instances, the US was more apologetic, but that in this case, they declined to issue any official statement and said on the phone that Tumeizi was "one of the terrorists." Naim Tubasi, chief of the Palestinian Journalists' Union, suggested Tumeizi's killing was the result of deliberate targeting of Arab journalists in Iraq, and called Tumeizi's killing "one more American crime in Iraq."
