= Roger Tallroth (wrestler) =

Swedish wrestler

Personal information
- Full name: Kurt Stefan Roger Tallroth
- Born: 28 August 1960 (age 65) Heby
- Occupation: fireman
- Years active: 1967-1987

Sport
- Sport: Wrestling
- Event: Greco-Roman
- Club: Ballingslövs BK
- Coached by: Leif Andersson
Medal record
Representing Sweden
Men's Greco-Roman wrestling
Olympic Games
Silver medal – second place	1984 Los Angeles	74 kg
European Championships
Gold medal – first place	1984 Jönköping	74 kg
Silver medal – second place	1982 Varna	74 kg
Silver medal – second place	1986 Piraeus	74 kg
Nordic Championships
Gold medal – first place	Sønderborg 1987	74 kg
Gold medal – first place	Varberg 1986	74 kg
Gold medal – first place	Tampere 1985	74 kg
Gold medal – first place	Næstved 1983	74 kg
Silver medal – second place	Göteborg 1982	74 kg
Silver medal – second place	Haparanda 1978	57 kg

Roger Tallroth is a retired Swedish wrestler. In 1984 he was an Olympic silver medalist and a European champion in wrestling.
