= Mazen Izzeddin Abdalla Tal =

Jordanian ambassador

Mazen Tal
- مـازن التل
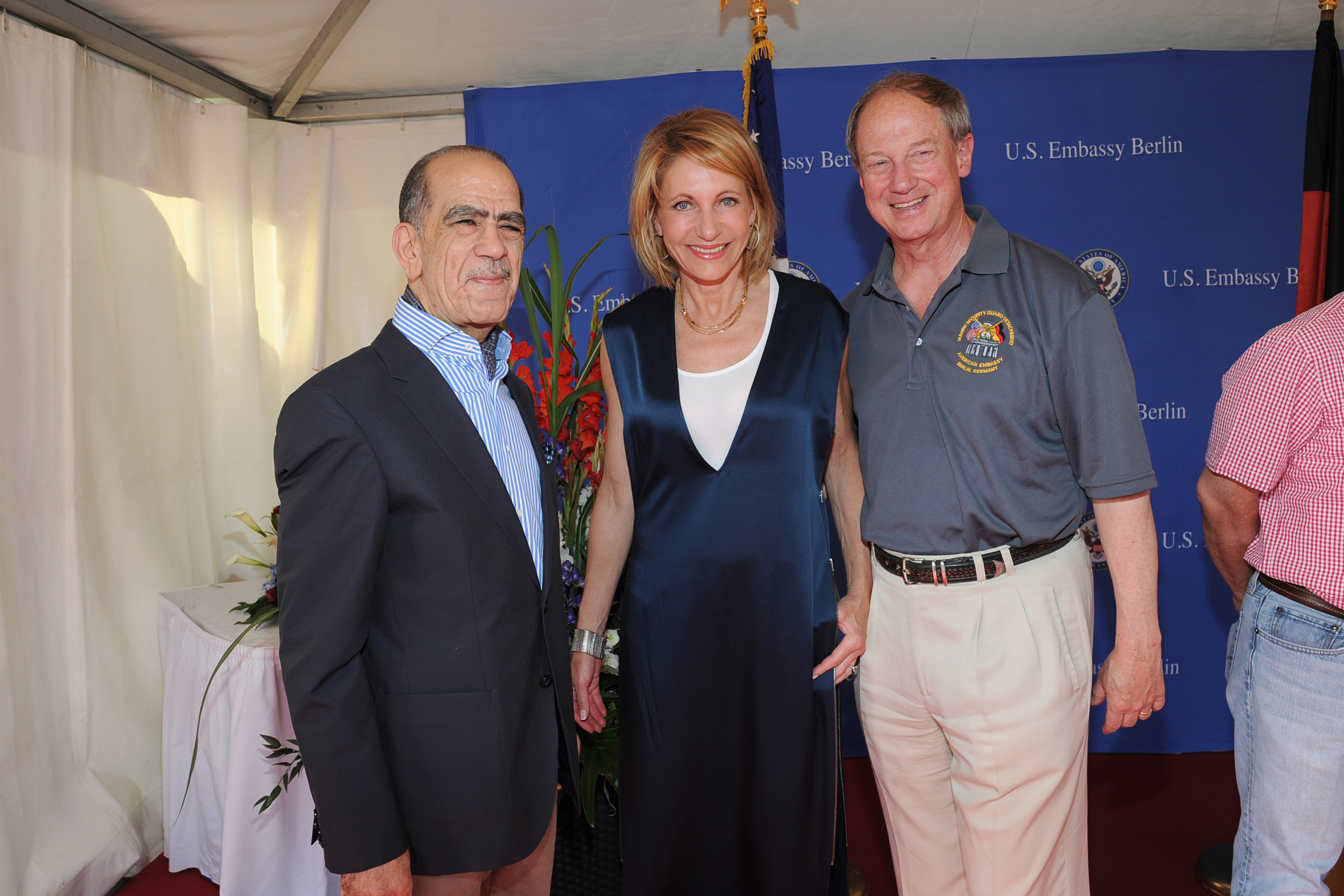
- Mazen Tal with Kimberly and John B. Emerson in 2016

Jordanian Ambassador to Israel of Jordan to Israel
- In office 2002–2003
- Preceded by: Omar Abdul-Monem Rifaï
- Succeeded by: Marouf al-Bakhit

Jordanian Ambassador to South Africa of Jordan to South Africa
- In office 2005 – October 2010
- Preceded by: Hussam Abdullah Ghodayeh Al Husseini
- Succeeded by: Omar Jamil Nadif Alturk

Jordanian Ambassador to Germany of Jordan to Germany
- In office December 15, 2011 – August 17, 2016
- Preceded by: Saleh Rusheidat
- Succeeded by: Amer Mustafa Al Jbour Majali

Personal details
- Born: 1952 (age 73–74)
- Education: 1972 bachelor's degree in public administration of the University of Jordan.; 1981: Master of Arts in political science of the University of Paris.; 1988 Doctorate in international relations of the University of Paris.; From 1988 to 2000 he was part-time lecturer at the University of Jordan in Political Science.

Mazen Tal (born 1952) is a retired Jordanian ambassador.

== Career ==
In 1976 he entered the foreign Service of Jordan. From 1978 to 1983 he was attaché in Paris.

From 1984 to 1988 he was second secretary next the Jordanian Representation next the United Nations Office at Geneva.

From 1991 to 1992 he was member of the Group of Technical Experts, Jordanian delegation at the Madrid Conference of 1991. From 1992 to 1994 he was counselor next the Headquarters of the United Nations. From 1995 to 1999 he was counselor and deputy head of the Jordanian Embassy in New Delhi.

From 2000 to 2004 he was chargé d'affaires in Tel Aviv. From 2005 to October 2010 he was ambassador in Pretoria (South Africa) with concurrent diplomatic accreditation in Maputo (Mozambique).

From October 2010 to December 15, 2011 he was head of the European Department in the Foreign Affairs ministry in Amman. From December 15, 2011 to August 17, 2016 he was ambassador in Berlin.
