= Marc Mongeon =

Canadian wrestler (born 1955)

Marc Mongeon (born 10 January 1955) is a Canadian former wrestler who competed in the 1984 Summer Olympics. He is now a science and PE teacher for St Patrick's Regional Secondary School in Vancouver B.C. He was born on 10 January 1955 in Iroquois Falls, Ontario, Canada. He competed in the 1984 summer Olympics in Los Angeles for team Canada and was placed 7th in the final standings. In the 1979 Pan American Games 74.0 kg. freestyle category he finished third.
