= Haifa Street helicopter incident =

Incident during the Iraq War

The Haifa Street helicopter incident or the Haifa Street massacre was a controversial event in Baghdad, Iraq, on September 12, 2004. The fighting started before dawn on Haifa Street, where insurgents detonated two car bombs and attacked American troops with heavy gunfire. An American Bradley armored fighting vehicle was mobilized to support US troops, but it was struck by a car bomb around 6:30 a.m. which wounded four American soldiers.

After the wounded Americans were evacuated, witnesses reported that a crowd had gathered around the burning Bradley, looking at the wreckage, rather than celebrating. Journalists also arrived on the scene, filming the burning wreckage. Reports said that the media and crowd had been gathered around the vehicle after the fighting ended. At around 8:00 a.m., an American helicopter fired two missiles and its machine guns at the burning tank, killing 13 people and injuring about 60 others, adding that the bodies were on the streets for more than 30 minutes before an ambulance was able to remove them. Several residential buildings were also damaged.

Among the dead was Mazen al-Tumeizi, a Palestinian reporter for al-Arabiya TV who was filming a report at the time. Tumeizi's death and the incident itself were caught by his cameraman. Among the injured were journalist Ghaith Abdul-Ahad and Reuters cameraman Seif Fouad.

The American military said it fired on the vehicle "to prevent looting and harm to the Iraqi people," and that they had fired on insurgents, not civilians.

== See also ==
- List of massacres in Iraq
- United States war crimes
- July 12, 2007, Baghdad airstrike
