= Ștefan Rusu =

Romanian wrestler (born 1956)

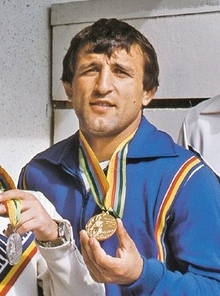
- Rusu at the 1980 Olympics

Personal information
- Born: 2 February 1956 (age 70) Rădăuţi, Romania
- Height: 170 cm (5 ft 7 in)

Sport
- Sport: Greco-Roman wrestling
- Club: Metalul București; CSA Steaua București; CS Dinamo București
- Coached by: Virgil Gherasim; Ion Cernea; Pavel Nicolae; Simion Popescu
Medal record
Representing Romania
Olympic Games
Gold medal – first place	1980 Moscow	68 kg
Silver medal – second place	1976 Montreal	68 kg
Bronze medal – third place	1984 Los Angeles	74 kg
World Championships
Gold medal – first place	1978 Mexico City	68 kg
Gold medal – first place	1982 Katowice	74 kg
Silver medal – second place	1985 Kolbotn	74 kg
Bronze medal – third place	1981 Oslo	68 kg
European Championships
Gold medal – first place	1978 Sofia	68 kg
Gold medal – first place	1979 Bucharest	68 kg
Gold medal – first place	1980 Prievidza	68 kg
Gold medal – first place	1981 Gothenburg	68 kg
Gold medal – first place	1985 Leipzig	74 kg
Silver medal – second place	1976 Leningrad	68 kg
Silver medal – second place	1977 Bursa	68 kg
Bronze medal – third place	1983 Budapest	74 kg
Summer Universiade
Gold medal – first place	1981 Bucharest	68 kg
Silver medal – second place	1977 Sofia	68 kg

Ştefan Rusu (born 2 February 1956) is a retired Greco-Roman wrestler from Romania. He competed at the 1976, 1980 and 1984 Olympics and won a silver, a gold and a bronze medal, respectively. He also won world titles in different weight divisions in 1978 and 1982 and European titles in 1978–1981 and 1985. After retiring from competitions he worked as a wrestling coach in Romania and in Turkey.
