= Karolj Kasap =

Medal record

Representing Yugoslavia

Men's Wrestling

World Championships
Bronze medal – third place	1981 Oslo	Welterweight
Bronze medal – third place	1982 Katowice	Welterweight
Bronze medal – third place	1983 Kiev	Welterweight

European Championships
Bronze medal – third place	1982 Varna	74kg

Karolj "Karlo" Kasap "Kaszap Károly (August 5, 1954 in Ada) is a Yugoslav/Serbian and later Canadian former wrestler who competed in the 1980 Summer Olympics and 1984 Summer Olympics for Yugoslavia and 1992 Summer Olympics for Canada.
