= Saïd Admane =

Algerian wrestler

Personal information
- Nationality: Algerian
- Height: 1.74 m (5 ft 9 in)
- Weight: 62 kg (137 lb)

Sport
- Sport: Wrestling

Saïd Admane is an Algerian wrestler. He competed in the 1980 Summer Olympics.
