= Almaty District =

Almaty District Алматы Ауданы
- District
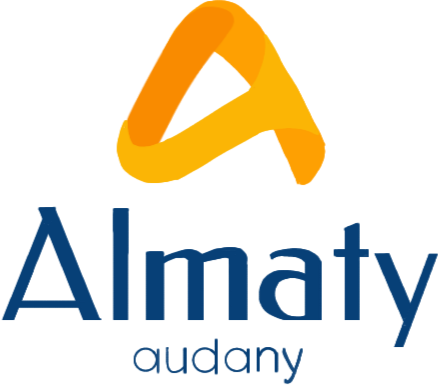
- Coat of arms

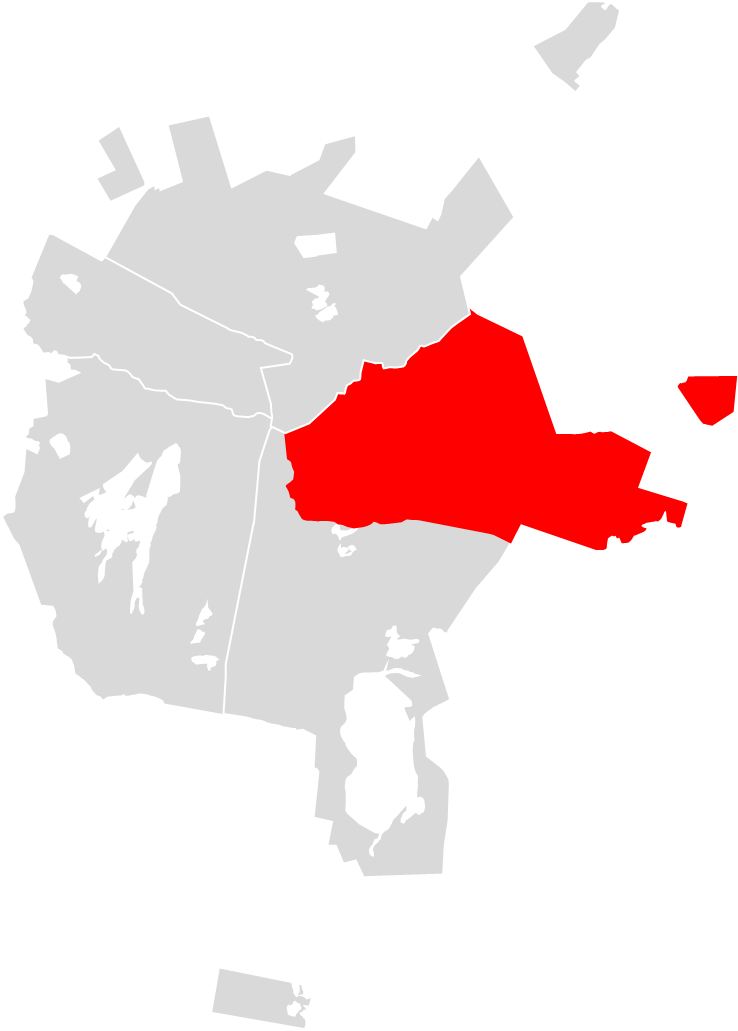
- Coordinates: 51°09′N 71°30′E
- Country: Kazakhstan
- Municipality: Astana

Government
  - Akim: Maksat Samatuly

Area
  - Total: 21,054 ha (52,030 acres)

Population (2014)
  - Total: 375,938
- District number: 1
- Website: Official website

Almaty District (Kazakh: Алматы ауданы, Almaty audany; Russian: Район Алматы), is an administrative subdivision of the city of Astana, Kazakhstan. It was named after the city of Almaty.

== Geography ==
Part of the mountainous Ile-Alatau National Park is in Almaty District.
