= Eberhard Probst =

German wrestler (1955–2024)

Personal information
- Nationality: German
- Born: 4 June 1955; Querfurt, Bezirk Halle, East Germany
- Died: 11 February 2024 (aged 68)

Sport
- Sport: Wrestling

Eberhard Probst (4 June 1955 – 11 February 2024) was a German wrestler. He competed at the 1976 Summer Olympics and the 1980 Summer Olympics. Probst died on 11 February 2024, at the age of 68.
