= Mazen Tuleimat =

Syrian wrestler

Personal information
- Nationality: Syrian
- Born: 8 March 1952 (age 74)

Sport
- Sport: Wrestling

Mazen Tuleimat (born 8 March 1952) is a Syrian wrestler. He competed in the men's freestyle 68 kg at the 1980 Summer Olympics, and lost both of his matches.
