= Jeff Stuebing =

Canadian wrestler (born 1959)

Jeff Stuebing (born 27 March 1959) is a Canadian former wrestler, born in Hamilton, Ontario, who competed in the 1984 Summer Olympics. In the 1983 Pan American Games 74.0 kg. Greco-Roman category he won the gold medal.
