= Celal Taşkıran =

Turkish wrestler (born 1954)

Celal Taşkıran (born 1 February 1954) is a Turkish former wrestler who competed in the 1984 Summer Olympics.
