= Stanisław Chiliński =

Polish wrestler (1956–2024)

Stanisław Chiliński (31 July 1956 – 8 November 2024) was a Polish wrestler who competed in the 1980 Summer Olympics. He was born in Stronie Śląskie on 31 July 1956, and died on 8 November 2024, at the age of 68.
