= Christopher Catalfo =

American wrestler (born 1959)

Christopher Lee Catalfo
Personal information
- Nationality: American
- Born: December 14, 1959 (age 66) Rochester, New York, U.S.
- Education: Pascack Hills High School; Syracuse University

Sport
- Sport: Wrestling

Achievements and titles
- Olympic finals: 1984 Summer Olympics

Christopher Lee Catalfo (born December 14, 1959, in Rochester, New York) is an American former wrestler who competed in the 1984 Summer Olympics.

Raised in Montvale, New Jersey, he was a state champion prep wrestler at Pascack Hills High School before winning collegiate honors at Syracuse University.
