= Montvale, New Jersey =

Borough in Bergen County, New Jersey, US

- Borough
- Montvale borough hall

- logo

- Location of Montvale in Bergen County highlighted in red (left). Inset map: Location of Bergen County in New Jersey highlighted in orange (right).

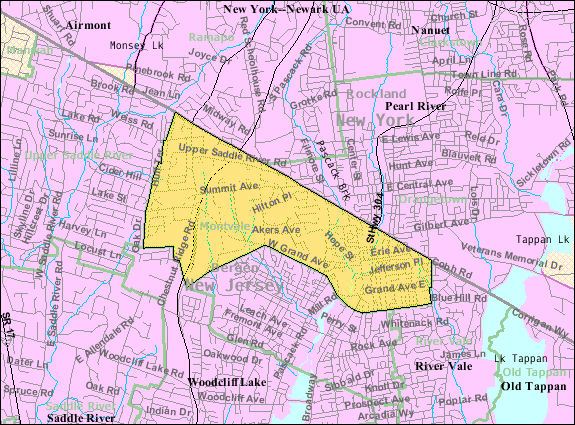
- Census Bureau map of Montvale, New Jersey

- Location in Bergen County Location in New Jersey Location in the United States
- Coordinates: 41.054594°N 74.047298°W
- Country: United States
- State: New Jersey
- County: Bergen
- Incorporated: August 31, 1894

Government
  - Type: Borough
  - Body: Borough Council
  - Mayor: Michael N. Ghassali (R, term ends December 31, 2027)
  - Administrator: Joseph Voytus
  - Municipal clerk: Fran Scordo

Area
  - Total: 4.03 sq mi (10.45 km^{2})
  - Land: 4.02 sq mi (10.42 km^{2})
  - Water: 0.012 sq mi (0.03 km^{2}) 0.25%
  - Rank: 298th of 565 in state 21st of 70 in county
- Elevation: 338 ft (103 m)

Population (2020)
  - Total: 8,436
  - Estimate (2024): 9,663
  - Rank: 280th of 565 in state 48th of 70 in county
  - Density: 2,096.9/sq mi (809.6/km^{2})
  - Rank: 286th of 565 in state 56th of 70 in county
- Time zone: UTC−05:00 (Eastern (EST))
  - Summer (DST): UTC−04:00 (Eastern (EDT))
- ZIP Code: 07645
- Area code: 201
- FIPS code: 3400347610
- GNIS feature ID: 0885306
- Website: www.montvale.org

Montvale is a borough in northern Bergen County, in the U.S. state of New Jersey, bordering the state of New York. The borough is part of the New York City metropolitan area. As of the 2020 United States census, the borough's population was 8,436, an increase of 592 (+7.5%) from the 2010 census count of 7,844, which in turn reflected an increase of 810 (+11.5%) from the 7,034 counted in the 2000 census.

== History ==
Montvale was incorporated as a borough on August 31, 1894, from portions of Orvil Township and Washington Township. The borough was formed during the "Boroughitis" phenomenon then sweeping through Bergen County, in which 26 boroughs were formed in the county in 1894 alone. On February 15, 1896, Montvale acquired part of Orvil Township. In 1906, Montvale added further land from Orvil and Washington townships, and in 1912, Montvale added territory from Upper Saddle River. On May 20, 1959, portions of Montvale were passed to River Vale, and on December 9 and 14, 1965, territories were exchanged between Montvale and Upper Saddle River. The borough's name is derived from its topography.

Montvale is nicknamed "The Pride of the Pascack Valley".

As of 2026, the borough is a member of Local Leaders for Responsible Planning in order to address the borough's Mount Laurel doctrine-based housing obligations.

== Geography ==
According to the U.S. Census Bureau, the borough had a total area of 4.03 square miles (10.45 km^{2}), including 4.02 square miles (10.42 km^{2}) of land and 0.01 square miles (0.03 km^{2}) of water (0.25%).

The borough borders six neighboring municipalities: Park Ridge, River Vale, Upper Saddle River and Woodcliff Lake in Bergen County; and both Pearl River (in the Town of Orangetown) and Chestnut Ridge (in the Town of Ramapo) in Rockland County, New York.

Unincorporated communities, localities and place names located partially or completely within the township include Chestnut Ridge.

Montvale is served by the Garden State Parkway at exits 171 and 172, as well as the New York State Thruway in Chestnut Ridge.

== Demographics ==
Historical population
Census	Pop.	Note	%±
1900	416		—
1910	522		25.5%
1920	779		49.2%
1930	1,243		59.6%
1940	1,342		8.0%
1950	1,856		38.3%
1960	3,699		99.3%
1970	7,327		98.1%
1980	7,318		−0.1%
1990	6,946		−5.1%
2000	7,034		1.3%
2010	7,844		11.5%
2020	8,436		7.5%
2024 (est.)	9,663	▲	14.5%
Population sources: 1900–1920 1900–1910; 1910–1930 1900–2020; 2000 2010 2020

=== Racial and ethnic composition ===
Montvale borough, New Jersey – Racial and ethnic composition Note: the US Census treats Hispanic/Latino as an ethnic category. This table excludes Latinos from the racial categories and assigns them to a separate category. Hispanics/Latinos may be of any race.
Race / Ethnicity (NH = Non-Hispanic)	Pop 2000	Pop 2010	Pop 2020	% 2000	% 2010	% 2020
White alone (NH)	6,358	6,395	6,069	90.39%	81.53%	71.94%
Black or African American alone (NH)	30	70	121	0.43%	0.89%	1.43%
Native American or Alaska Native alone (NH)	4	4	0	0.06%	0.05%	0.00%
Asian alone (NH)	373	861	1,324	5.30%	10.98%	15.69%
Native Hawaiian or Pacific Islander alone (NH)	0	0	1	0.00%	0.00%	0.01%
Other race alone (NH)	9	11	17	0.13%	0.14%	0.20%
Mixed race or Multiracial (NH)	43	84	221	0.61%	1.07%	2.62%
Hispanic or Latino (any race)	217	419	683	3.09%	5.34%	8.10%
Total	7,034	7,844	8,436	100.00%	100.00%	100.00%

=== 2020 census ===
As of the 2020 census, Montvale had a population of 8,436. The population density was 2,093.3 per square mile (808.2/km^{2}). There were 3,115 housing units with a density of approximately 773 per square mile (298/km^{2}).

The median age was 43.8 years. 23.0% of residents were under the age of 18, and 77.0% were age 18 or older; 18.4% were 65 years of age or older. For every 100 females there were 95.4 males, and for every 100 females age 18 and over there were 93.4 males. The median age was 43.0 for males and 44.8 for females.

There were 3,016 households, of which 37.0% had children under the age of 18 living in them. Of all households, 67.1% were married-couple households, 10.5% were households with a male householder and no spouse or partner present, and 19.6% were households with a female householder and no spouse or partner present. About 18.1% of all households were made up of individuals, and 10.1% had someone living alone who was 65 years of age or older.

There were 3,115 housing units, of which 3.2% were vacant. The homeowner vacancy rate was 0.9% and the rental vacancy rate was 2.8%. 100.0% of residents lived in urban areas, while 0.0% lived in rural areas.

=== 2010 census ===
The 2010 United States census counted 7,844 people, 2,778 households, and 2,203 families in the borough. The population density was 1,961.2 per square mile (757.2/km^{2}). There were 2,872 housing units at an average density of 718.1 per square mile (277.3/km^{2}). The racial makeup was 84.83% (6,654) White, 1.03% (81) Black or African American, 0.08% (6) Native American, 11.04% (866) Asian, 0.00% (0) Pacific Islander, 1.63% (128) from other races, and 1.39% (109) from two or more races. Hispanic or Latino of any race were 5.34% (419) of the population.

Of the 2,778 households, 39.3% had children under the age of 18; 68.6% were married couples living together; 8.1% had a female householder with no husband present and 20.7% were non-families. Of all households, 17.6% were made up of individuals and 7.3% had someone living alone who was 65 years of age or older. The average household size was 2.82 and the average family size was 3.22.

26.8% of the population were under the age of 18, 5.3% from 18 to 24, 23.6% from 25 to 44, 29.8% from 45 to 64, and 14.5% who were 65 years of age or older. The median age was 41.9 years. For every 100 females, the population had 95.6 males. For every 100 females ages 18 and older there were 93.1 males.

The Census Bureau's 2006–2010 American Community Survey showed that (in 2010 inflation-adjusted dollars) median household income was $111,633 (with a margin of error of +/− $13,448) and the median family income was $140,026 (+/− $14,508). Males had a median income of $100,000 (+/− $13,987) versus $55,000 (+/− $4,957) for females. The per capita income for the borough was $53,974 (+/− $7,262). About 3.6% of families and 5.3% of the population were below the poverty line, including 10.4% of those under age 18 and 1.5% of those age 65 or over.

Same-sex couples headed 10 households in 2010, an increase from the 8 counted in 2010.

=== 2000 census ===
As of the 2000 United States census, there were 7,034 people, 2,509 households, and 1,999 families residing in the borough. The population density was 1,769.8 inhabitants per square mile (683.3/km^{2}). There were 2,590 housing units at an average density of 651.7 per square mile (251.6/km^{2}). The racial makeup of the borough was 92.79% White, 0.44% African American, 0.09% Native American, 5.36% Asian, 0.63% from other races, and 0.70% from two or more races. Hispanic or Latino of any race were 3.09% of the population.

There were 2,509 households, out of which 37.7% had children under the age of 18 living with them, 71.4% were married couples living together, 6.1% had a female householder with no husband present, and 20.3% were non-families. 17.4% of all households were made up of individuals, and 7.3% had someone living alone who was 65 years of age or older. The average household size was 2.80 and the average family size was 3.18.

In the borough, the population was spread out, with 25.9% under the age of 18, 5.5% from 18 to 24, 27.7% from 25 to 44, 28.2% from 45 to 64, and 12.6% who were 65 years of age or older. The median age was 40 years. For every 100 females, there were 97.1 males. For every 100 females age 18 and over, there were 93.4 males.

The median income for a household in the borough was $93,031, and the median income for a family was $104,047. Males had a median income of $80,355 versus $37,440 for females. The per capita income for the borough was $45,448. About 0.9% of families and 0.9% of the population were below the poverty line, including 0.4% of those under age 18 and 1.0% of those age 65 or over.

== Economy ==
Montvale is home to the corporate headquarters of numerous major companies including Sharp Corporation (U.S. headquarters) and Benjamin Moore. In January 2015, Mercedes-Benz USA announced that they would be moving their headquarters from New Jersey to the Atlanta area later that year. The company had been based in North Jersey since 1972 and had 1,000 employees on a 37-acre (15 ha) campus in Montvale. Despite incentive offers from the State of New Jersey to remain in Bergen County, Mercedes-Benz cited proximity to manufacturing facilities and a growing customer base in the southeast in addition to as much as $50 million in tax incentives from Georgia governmental agencies. The borough was the world headquarters for The Great Atlantic & Pacific Tea Company (parent company of supermarket chains including A&P Markets, Pathmark and Waldbaum's) from the 1970s until its bankruptcy in 2015.

Montvale is home to the operational headquarters of Ingersoll Rand, Pentax and KPMG have a large local presence. The international marketing and commercial services headquarters of Western Union are located in Montvale.

The Shoppes at DePiero's Farm is a strip mall located on the former site of DePiero's Farm that opened on September 24, 2017. It is located just off exit 172 of the Garden State Parkway, directly across from the former Mercedes-Benz headquarters office, which is currently a mixed use property. Notable tenants include the first location of Wegmans in Bergen County. Due to state blue laws in effect in Bergen County, most retail stores in the strip mall are closed on Sundays except for grocery stores and restaurants.

== Government ==
=== Local government ===
Montvale is governed under the borough form of New Jersey municipal government, which is used in 218 municipalities (of the 564) statewide, making it the most common form of government in New Jersey. The governing body is composed of a mayor and a borough council, with all positions elected at-large on a partisan basis as part of the November general election. A mayor is elected directly by the voters to a four-year term of office. The borough council includes six members elected to serve three-year terms on a staggered basis, with two seats coming up for election each year in a three-year cycle. The borough form of government used by Montvale is a "weak mayor / strong council" government in which council members act as the legislative body with the mayor presiding at meetings and voting only in the event of a tie. The mayor can veto ordinances subject to an override by a two-thirds majority vote of the council. The mayor makes committee and liaison assignments for council members, and most appointments are made by the mayor with the advice and consent of the council.

The mayor and council meet every second Tuesday of the month for formal public meetings and on the last Tuesday of the month for informal work sessions. Meetings are open to the public and residents are given the opportunity to speak on proposed ordinances and other matters of concern at the formal meetings. Government-access television (GATV) usually televises the first meeting of each month on the local Public-access television cable TV channel.

The mayor is the chief executive officer of the borough, and as such presides over all public meetings, provides leadership in the development of community projects and makes appointments to various boards. The borough council exercises all legislative powers including adoption of the municipal budget, bond ordinances and the general business of the community.

The council's powers include adoption of ordinances; reviewing, revising and adopting the budget; making appropriations; levying taxes; authorizing bond issues; providing for the internal structure of local government; providing by ordinance for the creation and abolition of jobs; fixing salaries and establishing general municipal policy.

As of 2023, the mayor of Montvale Borough is Republican Michael Ghassali, whose term of office ends December 31, 2027. Members of the Montvale Borough Council are Council President Douglas M. Arendacs (R, 2026), Theresa Sileo Cudequest (R, 2026; elected to serve an unexpired term), Dieter Koelling (R, 2028), Timothy E. Lane (R, 2025), Christopher A. Roche (R, 2025), and Annmarie Russo-Vogelsang (R, 2028).

In December 2021, the council appointed former councilmember Theresa Cudequest from a list of three names nominated by the Republican municipal committee to fill the seat expiring in December 2023 that had been held by Rose Curry until she resigned from office. Cudequest served on an interim basis until the November 2022 general election, when voters chose her to serve the balance of the term of office.

=== Federal, state and county representation ===
Montvale is located in the 5th Congressional District and is part of New Jersey's 39th state legislative district.

For the 119th United States Congress, New Jersey's 5th congressional district is represented by Josh Gottheimer (D, Wyckoff). New Jersey is represented in the United States Senate by Democrats Cory Booker (Newark, term ends 2027) and Andy Kim (Moorestown, term ends 2031).

For the 2026–2027 session, the 39th legislative district of the New Jersey Legislature is represented in the State Senate by Holly Schepisi (R, River Vale) and in the General Assembly by Robert Auth (R, Old Tappan) and John V. Azzariti (R, Saddle River).

Bergen County is governed by a directly elected County Executive, with legislative functions performed by a Board of County Commissioners comprised of seven members who are elected at-large to three-year terms in partisan elections on a staggered basis, with either two or three seats coming up for election each November; a Chairman and Vice Chairman are selected from among its seven members at a reorganization meeting held every January. As of 2025, the county executive is James J. Tedesco III (D, Paramus), whose four-year term of office ends December 31, 2026.

Bergen County's Commissioners are Chair Mary J. Amoroso (D, Mahwah, 2025), Vice Chair Steven A. Tanelli (D, North Arlington, 2027), Chair Pro Tem Joan Voss (D, Fort Lee, 2026), Rafael Marte (D, Bergenfield, 2026), Germaine M. Ortiz (D, Emerson, 2025), Thomas J. Sullivan Jr. (D, Montvale, 2025) and Tracy Silna Zur (D, Franklin Lakes, 2027).

Bergen County's elected constitutional officials are Clerk John S. Hogan (D, Northvale, 2026), Sheriff Anthony Cureton (D, Englewood, 2027) and Surrogate Michael R. Dressler (D, Cresskill, 2026).

=== Politics ===
United States presidential election results for Montvale 2024 2020 2016 2012 2008 2004
Year	Republican		Democratic		Third party(ies)	
Year	No.	%	No.	%	No.	%
2024	2,601	50.21%	2,460	47.49%	119	2.30%
2020	2,437	46.97%	2,696	51.97%	55	1.06%
2016	2,221	51.29%	1,960	45.27%	149	3.44%
2012	2,275	56.42%	1,718	42.61%	39	0.97%
2008	2,277	54.72%	1,854	44.56%	30	0.72%
2004	2,221	55.85%	1,738	43.70%	18	0.45%

As of March 2011, there were a total of 5,132 registered voters in Montvale, of which 1,080 (21.0% vs. 31.7% countywide) were registered as Democrats, 1,546 (30.1% vs. 21.1%) were registered as Republicans and 2,499 (48.7% vs. 47.1%) were registered as Unaffiliated. There were 7 voters registered as Libertarians or Greens. Among the borough's 2010 Census population, 65.4% (vs. 57.1% in Bergen County) were registered to vote, including 89.3% of those ages 18 and over (vs. 73.7% countywide).

In the 2020 presidential election, Democrat Joe Biden received 2,696 votes, ahead of Republican Donald Trump who received 2,437 votes (51.4% to 46.4%). In the 2016 presidential election, Republican Donald Trump received 2,221 votes (51.0% vs. 41.1% countywide), ahead of Democrat Hillary Clinton with 1,960 votes (45.0% vs. 54.2%) and other candidates with 178 votes (4.1% vs. 4.6%), among the 4,402 ballots cast by the borough's 5,780 registered voters, for a turnout of 76.2% (vs. 72.5% in Bergen County). In the 2012 presidential election, Republican Mitt Romney received 2,275 votes (56.1% vs. 43.5% countywide), ahead of Democrat Barack Obama with 1,718 votes (42.3% vs. 54.8%) and other candidates with 39 votes (1.0% vs. 0.9%), among the 4,057 ballots cast by the borough's 5,494 registered voters, for a turnout of 73.8% (vs. 70.4% in Bergen County).

Gubernatorial election results for Montvale
Year	Republican		Democratic		Third party(ies)	
Year	No.	%	No.	%	No.	%
2025	2,069	51.80%	1,905	47.70%	20	0.50%
2021	1,639	54.34%	1,364	45.23%	13	0.43%
2017	1,352	55.52%	1,054	43.29%	29	1.19%
2013	1,714	69.53%	728	29.53%	23	0.93%
2009	1,590	58.67%	972	35.87%	148	5.46%
2005	1,372	52.73%	1,186	45.58%	44	1.69%

In the 2013 gubernatorial election, Republican Chris Christie received 69.5% of the vote (1,714 cast), ahead of Democrat Barbara Buono with 29.5% (728 votes), and other candidates with 0.9% (23 votes), among the 2,514 ballots cast by the borough's 5,299 registered voters (49 ballots were spoiled), for a turnout of 47.4%. In the 2009 gubernatorial election, Republican Chris Christie received 1,590 votes (57.9% vs. 45.8% countywide), ahead of Democrat Jon Corzine with 972 votes (35.4% vs. 48.0%), Independent Chris Daggett with 133 votes (4.8% vs. 4.7%) and other candidates with 15 votes (0.5% vs. 0.5%), among the 2,744 ballots cast by the borough's 5,197 registered voters, yielding a 52.8% turnout (vs. 50.0% in the county).

United States Senate election results for Montvale1
Year	Republican		Democratic		Third party(ies)	
Year	No.	%	No.	%	No.	%
2024	2,489	50.58%	2,334	47.43%	98	1.99%
2018	1,702	53.93%	1,381	43.76%	73	2.31%
2012	2,003	54.02%	1,640	44.23%	65	1.75%
2006	1,469	55.64%	1,139	43.14%	32	1.21%

United States Senate election results for Montvale2
Year	Republican		Democratic		Third party(ies)	
Year	No.	%	No.	%	No.	%
2020	2,464	48.50%	2,558	50.35%	58	1.14%
2014	1,131	53.40%	958	45.23%	29	1.37%
2013	826	54.41%	683	44.99%	9	0.59%
2008	2,098	54.75%	1,702	44.42%	32	0.84%

== Emergency services ==
Montvale has a volunteer fire department that was established in 1924. The department consists of a chief, an assistant chief, two captain companies, and two lieutenant companies. The station is home to Engine 1, Engine 2, Engine 4, and Tower 5. MFD is part of Bergen County Fire Battalion 8 and dispatching is contracted to Ridgewood-based Northwest Bergen Central Dispatch.

Along with Park Ridge and Woodcliff Lake, Montvale is one of the communities that is part of the Tri-Boro Volunteer Ambulance Corps, founded in 1938 and provides EMS service to these three communities. Tri-Boro is a non-profit and full volunteer group which provides free emergency service to those in the community who need it at any time. Its headquarters is located in Park Ridge near Mill Pond.

Montvale has its own police department. The police station is located in the Borough Hall on Mercedes Drive.

Montvale's Office of Emergency Management participates bi-monthly in the Radio Amateur Civil Emergency Service (RACES) drills in Bergen County, New Jersey. The Emergency Operations Center (EOC) is located in the Borough Hall on Mercedes Drive. The Montvale OEM consists of one OEM Coordinator, one Deputy OEM Coordinator, a team of RACES members and a Community emergency response team.

== Education ==
The Montvale Public Schools serve students in pre-kindergarten through eighth grade. As of the 2018–19 school year, the district, comprised of two schools, had an enrollment of 980 students and 88.0 classroom teachers (on an FTE basis), for a student–teacher ratio of 11.1:1. Schools in the district (with 2018–19 enrollment data from the National Center for Education Statistics) are Memorial Elementary School with 519 students in grades Pre-K through 4 and Fieldstone Middle School with 451 students in grades 5 to 8.

Public school students from Montvale in ninth through twelfth grades attend Pascack Hills High School along with students from neighboring Woodcliff Lake. The school is part of the Pascack Valley Regional High School District, which also serves students from Hillsdale and River Vale. Pascack Hills High School was the 7th-ranked public high school in New Jersey out of 339 schools statewide, in New Jersey Monthly magazine's September 2014 cover story on the state's "Top Public High Schools", after being ranked 18th in 2012 out of 328 schools. As of the 2018–19 school year, the high school had an enrollment of 842 students and 70.0 classroom teachers (on an FTE basis), for a student–teacher ratio of 12.0:1. Seats on the high-school district's nine-member board of education are allocated based on the population of the constituent municipalities, with two seats assigned to Montvale.

Public school students from the borough, and all of Bergen County, are eligible to attend the secondary education programs offered by the Bergen County Technical Schools, which include the Bergen County Academies in Hackensack, and the Bergen Tech campus in Teterboro or Paramus. The district offers programs on a shared-time or full-time basis, with admission based on a selective application process and tuition covered by the student's home school district.

Montvale is the home of Saint Joseph Regional High School, a college preparatory school for young men founded in 1962 in the Xaverian tradition of Catholic education, operating under the supervision of the Roman Catholic Archdiocese of Newark.

== Transportation ==
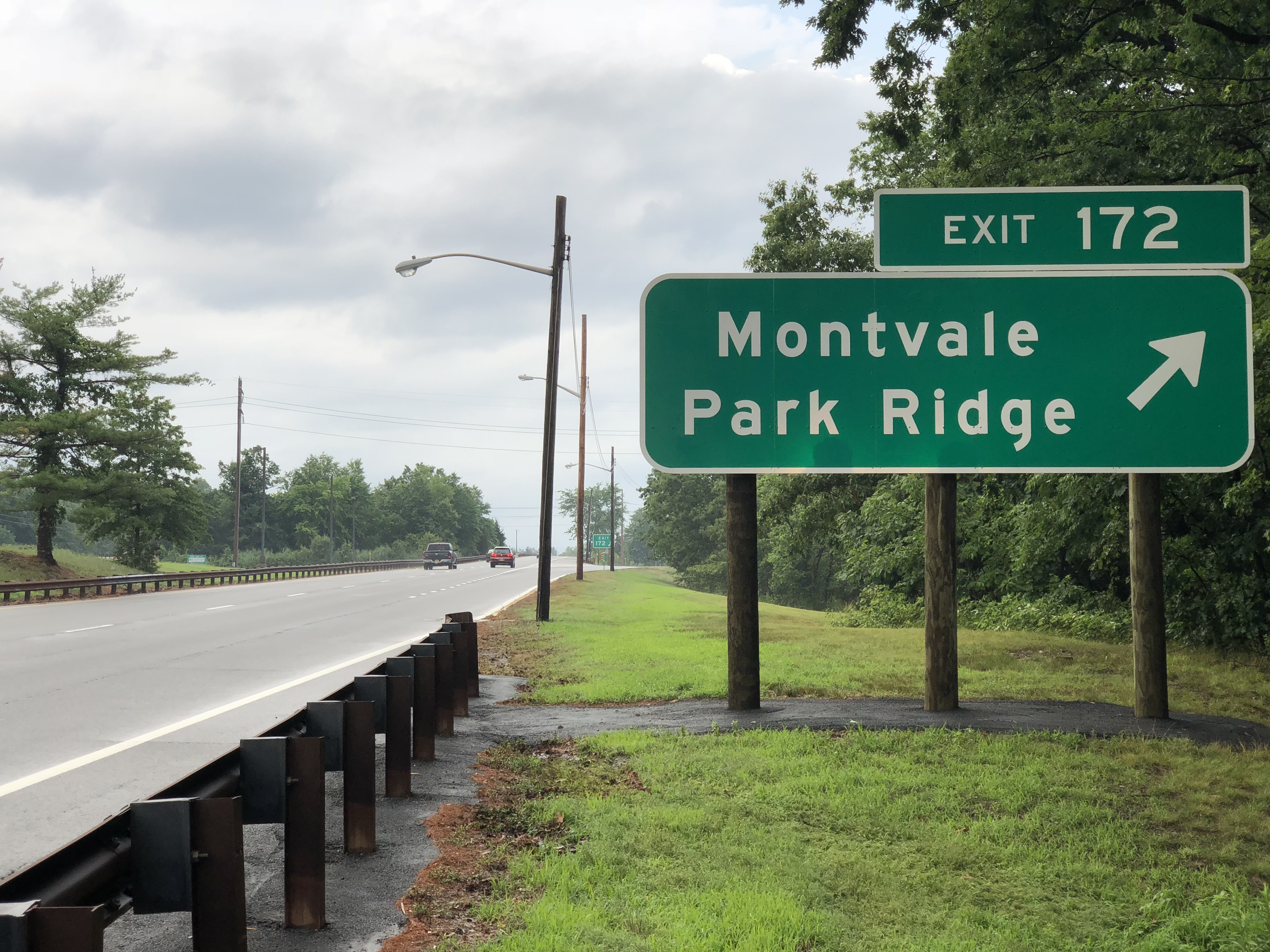
Garden State Parkway northbound at exit 172 in Montvale

=== Roads and highways ===
As of May 2010, the borough had a total of 46.82 miles (75.35 km) of roadways, of which 36.54 miles (58.81 km) were maintained by the municipality, 8.49 miles (13.66 km) by Bergen County and 1.79 miles (2.88 km) by the New Jersey Turnpike Authority.

The Garden State Parkway and County Route 503 pass through Montvale. The last stop going north on the Garden State Parkway before heading towards New York and the New York Thruway is in Montvale and features a large rest stop area.

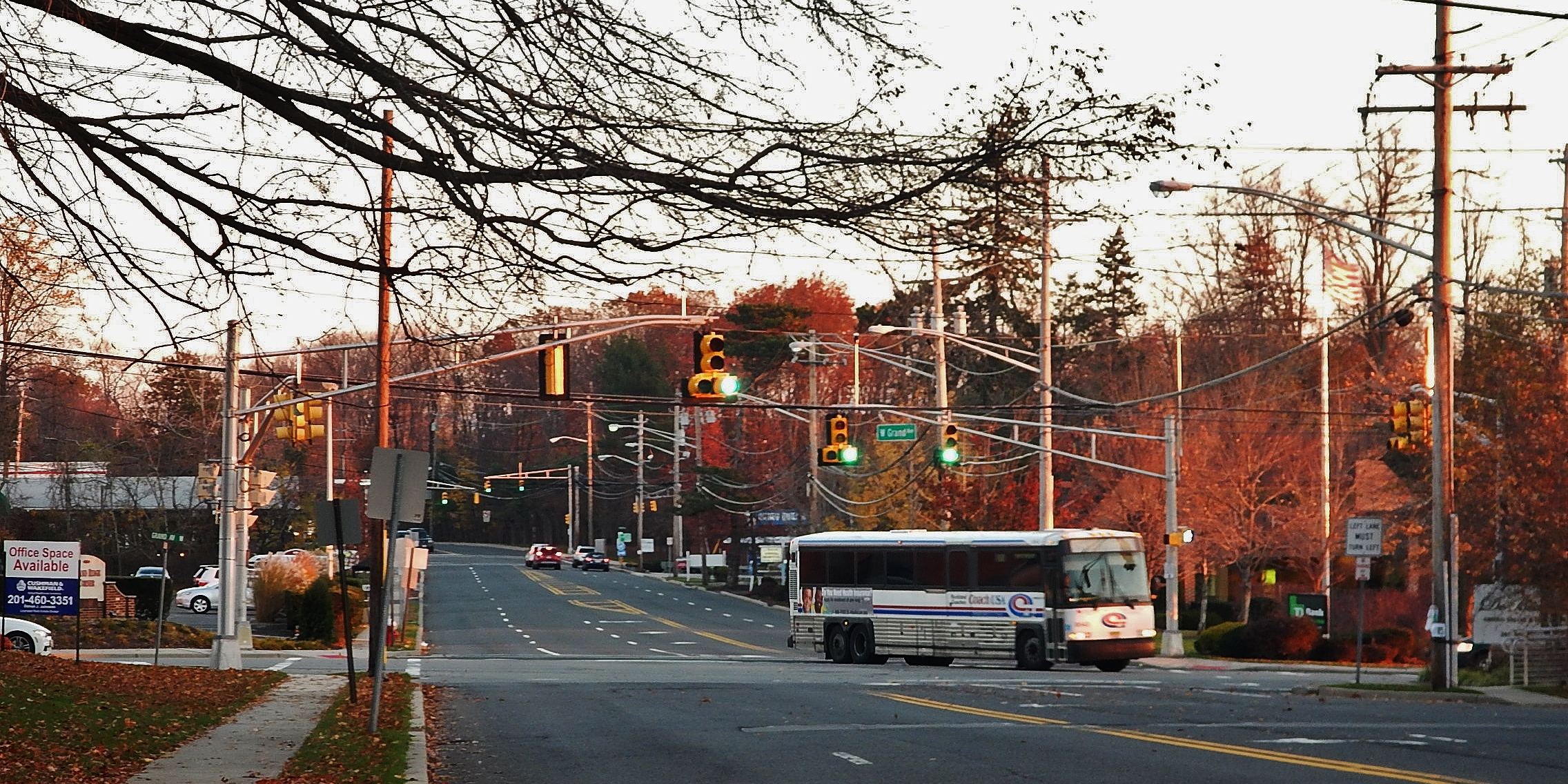
The intersection of Chesnut Ridge Road and Grand Avenue

=== Public transportation ===
Montvale is served by NJ Transit at the Montvale train station, located at the intersection of Kinderkamack Road and Grand Avenue. The station offers service on the Pascack Valley Line, which runs north–south to Hoboken Terminal with connections via the Secaucus Junction transfer station to New Jersey Transit one-stop service to New York Penn Station and to other NJ Transit rail service. Connections are available at the Hoboken Terminal to other New Jersey Transit rail lines, the PATH train at the Hoboken PATH station, New York Waterways ferry service to the World Financial Center and other destinations and Hudson-Bergen Light Rail service.

Rockland Coaches provides service on routes 11, 45, and 47/49 to the Port Authority Bus Terminal in Midtown Manhattan.

== Entertainment ==
Montvale had a roller skating rink called The Rink. It closed in 2007 and was replaced by a condominium complex.

Montvale Lanes includes 38 lanes of bowling.

== Notable people ==
People who were born in, residents of, or otherwise closely associated with Montvale include:

- Dana Bash (born 1971), CNN Capitol Hill journalist
- Marco Capozzoli (born 1988), placekicker for the Jacksonville Sharks of the Arena Football League (AFL)
- Christopher Catalfo (born 1959), former wrestler who competed in the 1984 Summer Olympics
- Tim Catalfo (born 1959), former amateur wrestling standout, professional wrestler and mixed martial artist
- Mary Dunleavy (born 1966), operatic soprano
- Alecko Eskandarian (born 1982), professional soccer player
- Edith Margaret Faulstich (1907–1972), philatelist and philatelic journalist who specialized in postal history and postal covers
- Jeff Hafley (born 1979), head coach of the Miami Dolphins of the National Football League (NFL)
- Aline Brosh McKenna (born 1967), screenwriter
- Zac Moncrief (born 1971), director of Family Guy, Phineas and Ferb and other cartoons
- Liliko Ogasawara (born 1972), former international competitor in judo who represented the United States in Judo at the 1996 Summer Olympics
- Kyle Palmieri (born 1991), right winger who has played in the NHL for the New York Islanders and New Jersey Devils
- Scottie Scheffler (born 1996), professional golfer on the PGA Tour, who has been ranked as the World No. 1 Golfer
- Kieran Scott (born 1974), author of chick lit and young adult books, including Private and I Was a Non-Blonde Cheerleader
- Charlotte Vandervalk (born 1937), represented Montvale in the New Jersey General Assembly from 1991 to 2012 and served on the Montvale Township Council from 1980 to 1985
- Jeffrey Vinokur (born 1990), science educator who combines hip-hop dance popping with live science demonstrations as "The Dancing Scientist"
- Shaun Weiss (born 1978), actor who played "Goldberg" in The Mighty Ducks film series
- Jacob R. Wortendyke (1818–1880), Congressman who represented New Jersey's 5th congressional district from 1857 to 1859
- Heather Zurich (born 1987), assistant coach and recruiting coordinator for the Long Island University Blackbirds women's basketball team

== Annual events ==
Each Memorial Day, the Tri-Boro area consisting of Montvale, Woodcliff Lake, and Park Ridge all participate in the annual Memorial Day Parade.

Since the 1920s, Santa arrives every Christmas Eve in the park on a fire truck and distributes stockings and toys to each child.

In late June there is a Day in the Park featuring, rides for the children, contests, food, and live music, concluding with fireworks.

In October, the Montvale Chamber of Commerce holds the annual Montvale Street Fair.

On September 11, a candle-lit Memorial Service is held. In 2021, a monument was erected in honor of those who died in the September 11, 2001, terrorist attacks.
