= Montvale Public Schools =

School district in Bergen County, New Jersey, US

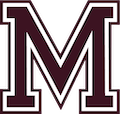

Address
- 47 Spring Valley Road Montvale, Bergen County, New Jersey, 07645; United States
- Coordinates: 41.053393°N 74.05144°W

District information
- Grades: Pre-K to 8
- Superintendent: Darren A. Petersen
- Business administrator: Andrea Wasserman
- Schools: 2

Students and staff
- Enrollment: 980 (as of 2018–19)
- Faculty: 88.0 FTEs
- Student–teacher ratio: 11.1:1

Other information
- District Factor Group: I
- Website: www.montvalek8.org
Ind.	Per pupil	District spending	Rank (*)	K-8 average	%± vs. average
1A	Total Spending	$16,096	22	$18,891	−14.8%
1	Budgetary Cost	13,007	26	14,159	−8.1%
2	Classroom Instruction	8,011	29	8,659	−7.5%
6	Support Services	2,031	41	2,167	−6.3%
8	Administrative Cost	1,678	54	1,547	8.5%
10	Operations & Maintenance	1,211	13	1,612	−24.9%
13	Extracurricular Activities	74	27	104	−28.8%
16	Median Teacher Salary	66,040	70	61,136
Data from NJDoE 2014 Taxpayers' Guide to Education Spending. *Of K-8 districts with more than 750 students. Lowest spending=1; Highest=84

The Montvale Public Schools are a comprehensive community public school district that serves students in pre-kindergarten through eighth grade in Montvale, in Bergen County, in the U.S. state of New Jersey.

As of the 2018–19 school year, the district, comprising two schools, had an enrollment of 980 students and 88.0 classroom teachers (on an FTE basis), for a student–teacher ratio of 11.1:1.

The district is classified by the New Jersey Department of Education as being in District Factor Group "I", the second-highest of eight groupings. District Factor Groups organize districts statewide to allow comparison by common socioeconomic characteristics of the local districts. From lowest socioeconomic status to highest, the categories are A, B, CD, DE, FG, GH, I and J.

Public school students from Montvale in ninth through twelfth grades attend Pascack Hills High School along with students from neighboring Woodcliff Lake. The school is part of the Pascack Valley Regional High School District, which also serves students from Hillsdale and River Vale. Pascack Hills High School was the 7th-ranked public high school in New Jersey out of 339 schools statewide, in New Jersey Monthly magazine's September 2014 cover story on the state's "Top Public High Schools", after being ranked 18th in 2012 out of 328 schools. As of the 2018–19 school year, the high school had an enrollment of 842 students and 70.0 classroom teachers (on an FTE basis), for a student–teacher ratio of 12.0:1.

== Schools ==
Schools in the district (with 2018–19 enrollment data from the National Center for Education Statistics) are:

- Memorial Elementary School with 519 students in grades pre-K through 4
  - Alyson Puzzo, principal
- Fieldstone Middle School with 451 students in grades 5 to 8
  - Michael Lauricella, principal
  - Courtney Risoli, assistant principal

== Administration ==
Core members of the district's administration are:

- Darren A. Petersen, superintendent
- Andrea Wasserman, business administrator and board secretary

== Board of education ==
The district's board of education, comprised of seven members, sets policy and oversees the fiscal and educational operation of the district through its administration. As a Type II school district, the board's trustees are elected directly by voters to serve three-year terms of office on a staggered basis, with three seats up for election each year held (since 2012) as part of the November general election. The board appoints a superintendent to oversee the district's day-to-day operations and a business administrator to supervise the business functions of the district.
