= János Takács (wrestler) =

Hungarian wrestler

Personal information
- Nationality: Hungarian
- Born: 1 November 1963 (age 61); Tatabánya, Hungary

Sport
- Sport: Wrestling

János Takács (born 1 November 1963) is a Hungarian wrestler. He competed at the 1988 Summer Olympics and the 1996 Summer Olympics.
