= Matzen-Raggendorf =

- Municipality
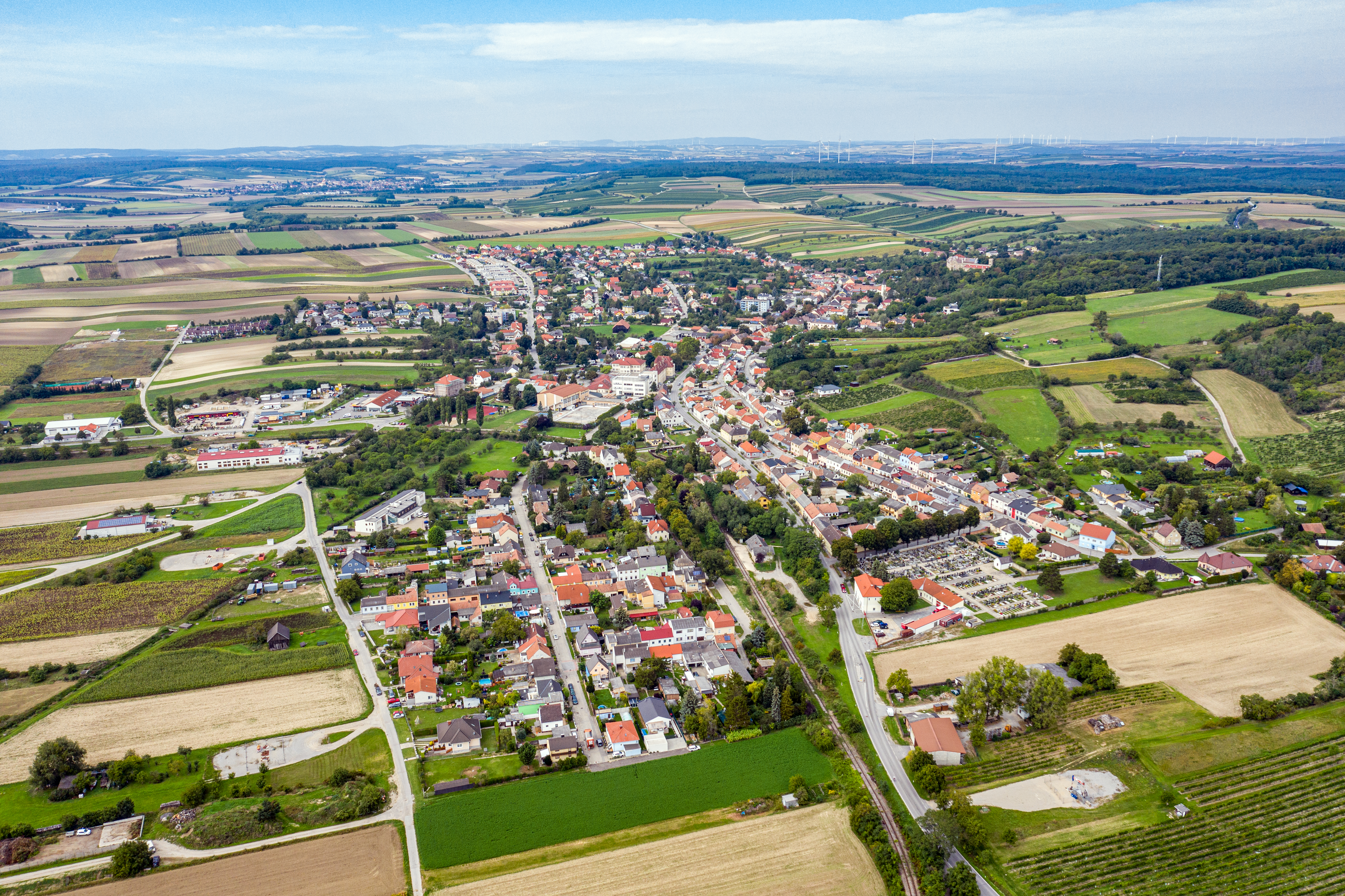
- Aerial view of Matzen

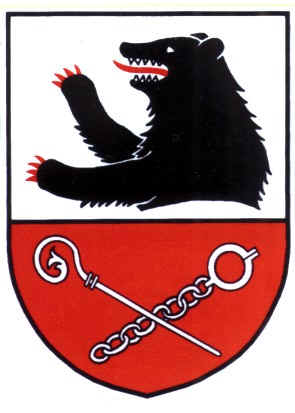
- Coat of arms

- Location within Austria
- Coordinates: 48°24′N 16°42′E
- Country: Austria
- State: Lower Austria
- District: Gänserndorf

Government
  - Mayor: Alfred Redlich

Area
  - Total: 35.59 km^{2} (13.74 sq mi)
- Elevation: 189 m (620 ft)

Population (2018-01-01)
  - Total: 2,794
  - Density: 78.51/km^{2} (203.3/sq mi)
- Time zone: UTC+1 (CET)
  - Summer (DST): UTC+2 (CEST)
- Postal code: 2243
- Area code: 02289
- Website: www.matzen-raggendorf.at

Matzen-Raggendorf is a municipality in the district of Gänserndorf in the Austrian state of Lower Austria.

== Geography ==
Matzen-Raggendorf lies on the edge of the Weinviertel hills and the Marchfeld in Lower Austria, about 35 km northeast of Vienna.
