= Mohamed Hamad =

Egyptian wrestler

Personal information
- Nationality: Egyptian
- Born: 10 September 1951 (age 74)

Sport
- Sport: Wrestling

Mohamed Hamad (born 10 September 1951) is an Egyptian former wrestler. He competed in two events at the 1984 Summer Olympics.
