= Martial Mischler =

French wrestler (born 1964)

Martial Mischler (born 6 July 1964) is a French former wrestler who competed in the 1984 Summer Olympics, in the 1988 Summer Olympics, and in the 1992 Summer Olympics.
