= Romelio Salas =

Colombian wrestler

Personal information
- Nationality: Colombian
- Born: 5 May 1958 (age 66)

Sport
- Sport: Wrestling

Romelio Salas (born 5 May 1958) is a Colombian wrestler. He competed at the 1984 Summer Olympics and the 1992 Summer Olympics.
