= Oscar Strático =

Argentinian Olympic judoka

Personal information
- Born: January 19, 1956 (age 70)
Medal record
Men's Judo
Representing Argentina
Pan American Games
Bronze medal – third place	1975 Mexico City	Lightweight

Oscar Salvador Nicolás Strático (born January 19, 1956) is a retired competitive judoka from Argentina, who represented his native country at the 1976 Summer Olympics in Montreal, Quebec, Canada.

Strático won the bronze medal at the 1975 Pan American Games in the men's lightweight division (– 70 kg). An older brother of Olympic judoka Alejandro Strático he switched from judo to wrestling, and represented Argentina in this sport at the 1984 Summer Olympics in Los Angeles, California.
