= Abdel Aziz Tahir =

Moroccan wrestler

Personal information
- Nationality: Moroccan
- Born: 27 July 1961 (age 63)

Sport
- Sport: Wrestling

Abdel Aziz Tahir (born 27 July 1961) is a Moroccan wrestler. He competed at the 1984 Summer Olympics and the 1988 Summer Olympics.
