= Selahattin Sağan =

Turkish wrestler (born 1961)

Selahattin Sağan (born 29 May 1961) is a Turkish former wrestler who competed in the 1984 Summer Olympics.
