= Ali Hussain Faris =

Iraqi wrestler (born 1957)

Personal information
- Nationality: Iraqi
- Born: 1957 (age 67–68)

Sport
- Sport: Wrestling

Ali Hussain Faris (Arabic: علي حسين فارس, born 1957) is an Iraqi wrestler. He competed at the 1980 Summer Olympics and the 1984 Summer Olympics.
