= 1997 World Wrestling Championships – Men's Greco-Roman 76 kg =

Men's Greco-Roman 76 kg at the 1997 World Championships
- Venue: Hala Ludowa
- Dates: 10–12 September 1997
- Competitors: 30 from 30 nations

Medalists
gold medal	Marko Yli-Hannuksela	Finland
silver medal	Tamás Berzicza	Hungary
bronze medal	Filiberto Azcuy	Cuba

The men's Greco-Roman 76 kilograms is a competition featured at the 1997 World Wrestling Championships, and was held in Wrocław, Poland from 10 to 12 September 1997.

== Results ==
Legend

- 3C — Won by 3 cautions given to the opponent
- WO — Won by walkover

=== Round 1 ===
	Score	
Round of 32
Attila Bátky (SVK)	1–5	Khvicha Bichinashvili (GEO)
Filiberto Azcuy (CUB)	11–0	Elias Marcano (VEN)
Murat Kardanov (RUS)	4–0	Mircea Constantin (ROM)
Tõnis Naarits (EST)	0–4	Takamitsu Katayama (JPN)
Bakhtiyar Baiseitov (KAZ)	6–0	Thomas Larsen (NOR)
Józef Tracz (POL)	2–3	Yvon Riemer (FRA)
Daniel Havlík (CZE)	8–0 Fall	Rodolfo Hernández (MEX)
Han Chee-ho (KOR)	11–4 Fall	Nadir Gadzhiyev (AZE)
Dalibor Bušić (YUG)	6–5	Hu Fujiang (CHN)
Marko Yli-Hannuksela (FIN)	9–0 3C	Matt Lindland (USA)
Bisolt Dezeev (KGZ)	0–10	David Manukyan (UKR)
Jurijs Vojevoda (LAT)	0–5	Nazmi Avluca (TUR)
José Alberto Recuero (ESP)	0–9	Erik Hahn (GER)
Björn Fritz (SWE)	0–3	Dimitrios Avramis (GRE)
Søren Brogaard (DEN)	0–5	Tamás Berzicza (HUN)

=== Round 2 ===
	Score	
Round of 16
Khvicha Bichinashvili (GEO)	3–4	Filiberto Azcuy (CUB)
Murat Kardanov (RUS)	6–0	Takamitsu Katayama (JPN)
Bakhtiyar Baiseitov (KAZ)	3–2	Yvon Riemer (FRA)
Daniel Havlík (CZE)	5–8	Han Chee-ho (KOR)
Dalibor Bušić (YUG)	1–9	Marko Yli-Hannuksela (FIN)
David Manukyan (UKR)	0–5	Nazmi Avluca (TUR)
Erik Hahn (GER)	2–2	Dimitrios Avramis (GRE)
Tamás Berzicza (HUN)		Bye
Repechage
Attila Bátky (SVK)	10–0	Elias Marcano (VEN)
Mircea Constantin (ROM)	5–0	Tõnis Naarits (EST)
Thomas Larsen (NOR)	1–8	Józef Tracz (POL)
Rodolfo Hernández (MEX)	0–5 Fall	Nadir Gadzhiyev (AZE)
Hu Fujiang (CHN)	1–2	Matt Lindland (USA)
Bisolt Dezeev (KGZ)	6–0 Fall	Jurijs Vojevoda (LAT)
José Alberto Recuero (ESP)	4–0	Björn Fritz (SWE)
Søren Brogaard (DEN)		Bye

=== Round 3 ===
	Score	
Quarterfinals
Tamás Berzicza (HUN)	2–1	Filiberto Azcuy (CUB)
Murat Kardanov (RUS)	0–2	Bakhtiyar Baiseitov (KAZ)
Han Chee-ho (KOR)	0–4	Marko Yli-Hannuksela (FIN)
Nazmi Avluca (TUR)	3–1	Erik Hahn (GER)
Repechage
Søren Brogaard (DEN)	0–9	Attila Bátky (SVK)
Mircea Constantin (ROM)	1–1	Józef Tracz (POL)
Nadir Gadzhiyev (AZE)	1–6	Matt Lindland (USA)
Bisolt Dezeev (KGZ)	3–0	José Alberto Recuero (ESP)
Khvicha Bichinashvili (GEO)	5–2	Takamitsu Katayama (JPN)
Yvon Riemer (FRA)	3–2	Daniel Havlík (CZE)
Dalibor Bušić (YUG)	0–7	David Manukyan (UKR)
Dimitrios Avramis (GRE)		Bye

=== Round 4 ===
	Score	
Repechage
Dimitrios Avramis (GRE)	5–0	Attila Bátky (SVK)
Józef Tracz (POL)	5–0	Matt Lindland (USA)
Bisolt Dezeev (KGZ)	2–3	Khvicha Bichinashvili (GEO)
Yvon Riemer (FRA)	4–1	David Manukyan (UKR)
Filiberto Azcuy (CUB)	3–1	Murat Kardanov (RUS)
Han Chee-ho (KOR)	WO	Erik Hahn (GER)

=== Round 5 ===
	Score	
Semifinals
Tamás Berzicza (HUN)	2–2	Bakhtiyar Baiseitov (KAZ)
Marko Yli-Hannuksela (FIN)	0–0	Nazmi Avluca (TUR)
Repechage
Dimitrios Avramis (GRE)	0–1	Józef Tracz (POL)
Khvicha Bichinashvili (GEO)	2–3	Yvon Riemer (FRA)
Filiberto Azcuy (CUB)	4–0	Erik Hahn (GER)

=== Round 6 ===
	Score	
Repechage
Józef Tracz (POL)	0–3	Filiberto Azcuy (CUB)
Yvon Riemer (FRA)		Bye

=== Round 7 ===
	Score	
Repechage
Bakhtiyar Baiseitov (KAZ)	2–5	Filiberto Azcuy (CUB)
Yvon Riemer (FRA)	9–4	Nazmi Avluca (TUR)

=== Finals ===
	Score	
5th place match
Bakhtiyar Baiseitov (KAZ)	5–0	Nazmi Avluca (TUR)
Bronze medal match
Filiberto Azcuy (CUB)	5–3	Yvon Riemer (FRA)
Final
Tamás Berzicza (HUN)	1–3	Marko Yli-Hannuksela (FIN)
