= 1999 World Wrestling Championships – Men's Greco-Roman 76 kg =

Men's Greco-Roman 76 kg at the 1999 World Championships
- Venue: Peace and Friendship Stadium
- Dates: 23–25 September 1999
- Competitors: 37 from 37 nations

Medalists
gold medal	Nazmi Avluca	Turkey
silver medal	Yvon Riemer	France
bronze medal	Dimitrios Avramis	Greece

The men's Greco-Roman 76 kilograms is a competition featured at the 1999 World Wrestling Championships, and was held at the Peace and Friendship Stadium in Piraeus, Athens, Greece from 23 to 25 September 1999.

== Results ==
Legend

- R — Retired

=== Preliminary round ===
==== Pool 1 ====
Pos	Athlete	Pld	W	L	CP	TP	BLR	MDA	CYP
1	Viachaslau Makaranka (BLR)	2	2	0	7	26	—	8–0	18–0 Fall
2	Igor Balaur (MDA)	2	1	1	4	15	0–3 PO	—	15–0 Fall
3	Antonis Antoniou (CYP)	2	0	2	0	0	0–4 TO	0–4 TO	—

Source: Official website

==== Pool 2 ====
Pos	Athlete	Pld	W	L	CP	TP	HUN	EST	YUG
1	Tamás Berzicza (HUN)	2	2	0	6	10	—	7–2	3–1
2	Tõnis Naarits (EST)	2	1	1	4	7	1–3 PP	—	5–3
3	Dalibor Bušić (YUG)	2	0	2	2	4	1–3 PP	1–3 PP	—

Source: Official website

==== Pool 3 ====
Pos	Athlete	Pld	W	L	CP	TP	KOR	FRA	MEX
1	Kim Jin-soo (KOR)	2	2	0	7	16	—	6–1	10–0
2	Yvon Riemer (FRA)	2	1	1	5	7	1–3 PP	—	6–0 Fall
3	Rodolfo Hernández (MEX)	2	0	2	0	0	0–4 ST	0–4 TO	—

Source: Official website

==== Pool 4 ====
Pos	Athlete	Pld	W	L	CP	TP	TUR	USA	KAZ
1	Nazmi Avluca (TUR)	2	2	0	6	6	—	3–0	3–0
2	Matt Lindland (USA)	2	1	1	3	3	0–3 PO	—	3–2
3	Bakhtiyar Baiseitov (KAZ)	2	0	2	1	2	0–3 PO	1–3 PP	—

Source: Official website

==== Pool 5 ====
Pos	Athlete	Pld	W	L	CP	TP	SWE	UKR	VEN
1	Ara Abrahamian (SWE)	2	2	0	7	14	—	3–1	11–0
2	David Manukyan (UKR)	2	1	1	4	11	1–3 PP	—	10–1
3	Paúl Pérez (VEN)	2	0	2	1	1	0–4 ST	1–3 PP	—

Source: Official website

==== Pool 6 ====
Pos	Athlete	Pld	W	L	CP	TP	UZB	JPN	ESP
1	Evgeniy Erofaylov (UZB)	2	2	0	6	7	—	3–0	4–2
2	Takamitsu Katayama (JPN)	2	1	1	3	9	0–3 PO	—	9–2
3	José Alberto Recuero (ESP)	2	0	2	2	4	1–3 PP	1–3 PP	—

Source: Official website

==== Pool 7 ====
Pos	Athlete	Pld	W	L	CP	TP	GEO	CUB	AUS
1	Tarieli Melelashvili (GEO)	2	2	0	7	13	—	9–3	4–0 Fall
2	Filiberto Azcuy (CUB)	2	1	1	5	16	1–3 PP	—	13–0
3	Neofitos Pertsinidis (AUS)	2	0	2	0	0	0–4 TO	0–4 ST	—

Source: Official website

==== Pool 8 ====
Pos	Athlete	Pld	W	L	CP	TP	POL	KGZ	NOR
1	Artur Michalkiewicz (POL)	2	2	0	7	13	—	3–0	10–0 C
2	Azamat Almabekov (KGZ)	2	1	1	3	4	0–3 PO	—	4–0
3	Ole Petter Tveiten (NOR)	2	0	2	0	0	0–4 EX	0–3 PO	—

Source: Official website

==== Pool 9 ====
Pos	Athlete	Pld	W	L	CP	TP	GRE	CHN	IRI
1	Dimitrios Avramis (GRE)	2	2	0	7	16	—	12–0	4–0
2	Wang Sileng (CHN)	2	1	1	3	3	0–4 ST	—	3–1
3	Hossein Marashian (IRI)	2	0	2	1	1	0–3 PO	1–3 PP	—

Source: Official website

==== Pool 10 ====
Pos	Athlete	Pld	W	L	CP	TP	SVK	RSA	NED
1	Attila Bátky (SVK)	2	2	0	8	22	—	11–0	11–0
2	Gideon Malherbe (RSA)	2	1	1	4	10	0–4 ST	—	10–0
3	Fred de Vos (NED)	2	0	2	0	0	0–4 ST	0–4 ST	—

Source: Official website

==== Pool 11 ====
Pos	Athlete	Pld	W	L	CP	TP	FIN	GER	AZE
1	Marko Yli-Hannuksela (FIN)	2	2	0	6	15	—	7–0	8–1
2	Konstantin Schneider (GER)	2	1	1	3	6	0–3 PO	—	6–2
3	Nazim Ahmadov (AZE)	2	0	2	2	3	1–3 PP	1–3 PP	—

Source: Official website

==== Pool 12 ====
Pos	Athlete	Pld	W	L	CP	TP	RUS	ARM	ROM	BUL
1	Murat Kardanov (RUS)	3	3	0	9	17	—	3–1	5–0	9–0
2	Levon Geghamyan (ARM)	3	2	1	8	13	1–3 PP	—	1–0	11–0
3	Mircea Constantin (ROM)	3	1	2	4	10	0–3 PO	0–3 PO	—	10–0
4	Ivan Belkin (BUL)	3	0	3	0	0	0–3 PO	0–4 ST	0–4 ST	—

Source: Official website

=== Knockout round ===
Round of 16
Viachaslau Makaranka (BLR)	2
Tamás Berzicza (HUN)	2
Kim Jin-soo (KOR)	0
Nazmi Avluca (TUR)	3
Ara Abrahamian (SWE)	3
Evgeniy Erofaylov (UZB)	0
Tarieli Melelashvili (GEO)	4
Artur Michalkiewicz (POL)	1
Dimitrios Avramis (GRE)	7
Attila Bátky (SVK)	1
Marko Yli-Hannuksela (FIN)	2
Murat Kardanov (RUS)	4
Igor Balaur (MDA)	0
Yvon Riemer (FRA)	4
Filiberto Azcuy (CUB)	3
Levon Geghamyan (ARM)	4

Quarterfinals
Tamás Berzicza (HUN)	2
Nazmi Avluca (TUR)	3
Ara Abrahamian (SWE)	1
Tarieli Melelashvili (GEO)	3
Dimitrios Avramis (GRE)	3
Murat Kardanov (RUS)	2
Yvon Riemer (FRA)	4
Levon Geghamyan (ARM)	0

Semifinals
Nazmi Avluca (TUR)	9
Tarieli Melelashvili (GEO)	0
Dimitrios Avramis (GRE)	7
Yvon Riemer (FRA)	8

Final
Nazmi Avluca (TUR)	11
Yvon Riemer (FRA)	0
Bronze medal match
Tarieli Melelashvili (GEO)	0^{R}
Dimitrios Avramis (GRE)	5
