= 1998 World Wrestling Championships – Men's Greco-Roman 76 kg =

Men's Greco-Roman 76 kg at the 1998 World Championships
- Venue: Gavlerinken
- Dates: 27–29 August 1998
- Competitors: 27 from 27 nations

Medalists
gold medal	Bakhtiyar Baiseitov	Kazakhstan
silver medal	Filiberto Azcuy	Cuba
bronze medal	Nazmi Avluca	Turkey

The men's Greco-Roman 76 kilograms is a competition featured at the 1998 World Wrestling Championships, and was held at the Gavlerinken in Gävle, Sweden from 27 to 29 August 1998.

== Results ==
Legend

- 3C — Won by 3 cautions given to the opponent

=== Round 1 ===
	Score	
Round of 32
Jurijs Vojevoda (LAT)	0–4	Dalibor Bušić (YUG)
Filiberto Azcuy (CUB)	4–0	Tõnis Naarits (EST)
Levon Geghamyan (ARM)	5–3	Torbjörn Kornbakk (SWE)
Tamás Berzicza (HUN)	4–1	Takamitsu Katayama (JPN)
Dimitrios Avramis (GRE)	4–0	Erik Hahn (GER)
In Tae-jung (KOR)	0–8	Murat Kardanov (RUS)
Bisolt Dezeev (KGZ)	0–7	Nazmi Avluca (TUR)
Zoran Vukan (SLO)	0–6	Børge Johansen (NOR)
Bakhtiyar Baiseitov (KAZ)	6–3	Józef Tracz (POL)
Yvon Riemer (FRA)	0–3	Stoyan Dobrev (BUL)
Khvicha Bichinashvili (GEO)	5–0	Mohammad Al-Ken (SYR)
Matt Lindland (USA)	12–0	José Alberto Recuero (ESP)
Attila Bátky (SVK)	3–2	David Manukyan (UKR)
Marko Yli-Hannuksela (FIN)		Bye

=== Round 2 ===
	Score	
Round of 16
Marko Yli-Hannuksela (FIN)	9–0	Dalibor Bušić (YUG)
Filiberto Azcuy (CUB)	3–0	Levon Geghamyan (ARM)
Tamás Berzicza (HUN)	2–2	Dimitrios Avramis (GRE)
Murat Kardanov (RUS)	1–0	Nazmi Avluca (TUR)
Børge Johansen (NOR)	0–7	Bakhtiyar Baiseitov (KAZ)
Stoyan Dobrev (BUL)	2–5	Khvicha Bichinashvili (GEO)
Matt Lindland (USA)	4–0	Attila Bátky (SVK)
Repechage
Jurijs Vojevoda (LAT)	1–3	Tõnis Naarits (EST)
Torbjörn Kornbakk (SWE)	1–5	Takamitsu Katayama (JPN)
Erik Hahn (GER)	4–0	In Tae-jung (KOR)
Bisolt Dezeev (KGZ)	6–0 Fall	Zoran Vukan (SLO)
Józef Tracz (POL)	2–3	Mohammad Al-Ken (SYR)
José Alberto Recuero (ESP)	1–9	David Manukyan (UKR)

=== Round 3 ===
	Score	
Quarterfinals
Marko Yli-Hannuksela (FIN)	2–4	Filiberto Azcuy (CUB)
Tamás Berzicza (HUN)	0–3	Murat Kardanov (RUS)
Bakhtiyar Baiseitov (KAZ)	12–0	Khvicha Bichinashvili (GEO)
Matt Lindland (USA)		Bye
Repechage
Tõnis Naarits (EST)	1–0	Takamitsu Katayama (JPN)
Erik Hahn (GER)	6–0 3C	Bisolt Dezeev (KGZ)
Mohammad Al-Ken (SYR)	0–4	David Manukyan (UKR)
Dalibor Bušić (YUG)	1–3	Levon Geghamyan (ARM)
Dimitrios Avramis (GRE)	0–2	Nazmi Avluca (TUR)
Børge Johansen (NOR)	0–5	Stoyan Dobrev (BUL)
Attila Bátky (SVK)		Bye

=== Round 4 ===
	Score	
Repechage
Attila Bátky (SVK)	0–4	Tõnis Naarits (EST)
David Manukyan (UKR)	3–9	Levon Geghamyan (ARM)
Nazmi Avluca (TUR)	2–2	Stoyan Dobrev (BUL)
Marko Yli-Hannuksela (FIN)	3–0	Tamás Berzicza (HUN)
Khvicha Bichinashvili (GEO)		Bye

=== Round 5 ===
	Score	
Semifinals
Matt Lindland (USA)	0–4	Filiberto Azcuy (CUB)
Murat Kardanov (RUS)	0–2	Bakhtiyar Baiseitov (KAZ)
Repechage
Khvicha Bichinashvili (GEO)	4–3 Ret	Tõnis Naarits (EST)
Levon Geghamyan (ARM)	2–1	Marko Yli-Hannuksela (FIN)
Nazmi Avluca (TUR)		Bye

=== Round 6 ===
	Score	
Repechage
Nazmi Avluca (TUR)	2–1	Khvicha Bichinashvili (GEO)
Levon Geghamyan (ARM)		Bye

=== Round 7 ===
	Score	
Repechage
Matt Lindland (USA)	0–3	Nazmi Avluca (TUR)
Levon Geghamyan (ARM)	0–3	Murat Kardanov (RUS)

=== Finals ===
	Score	
Bronze medal match
Nazmi Avluca (TUR)	1–1	Murat Kardanov (RUS)
Final
Filiberto Azcuy (CUB)	3–9	Bakhtiyar Baiseitov (KAZ)
