= 2001 World Wrestling Championships – Men's Greco-Roman 76 kg =

Men's Greco-Roman 76 kg at the 2001 World Championships
- Venue: Dimitris Tofalos Arena
- Dates: 6–8 December 2001
- Competitors: 34 from 34 nations

Medalists
gold medal	Ara Abrahamian	Sweden
silver medal	Aleksey Mishin	Russia
bronze medal	Kim Jin-soo	South Korea

The men's Greco-Roman 76 kilograms is a competition featured at the 2001 World Wrestling Championships, and was held at the Dimitris Tofalos Arena in Patras, Greece from 6 to 8 December 2001.

== Results ==
Legend

- F — Won by fall

=== Preliminary round ===
==== Pool 1 ====
Pos	Athlete	Pld	W	L	CP	TP	FIN	JPN	BUL
1	Marko Yli-Hannuksela (FIN)	2	2	0	7	14	—	11–0	3–0
2	Taichi Suga (JPN)	2	1	1	3	6	0–4 ST	—	6–5
3	Tano Prochenski (BUL)	2	0	2	1	5	0–3 PO	1–3 PP	—

Source: Japan Wrestling

==== Pool 2 ====
Pos	Athlete	Pld	W	L	CP	TP	POL	TUR	FRA
1	Artur Michalkiewicz (POL)	2	1	1	4	9	—	7–2	2–3
2	Nazmi Avluca (TUR)	2	1	1	4	8	1–3 PP	—	6–0
3	Yvon Riemer (FRA)	2	1	1	3	3	3–1 PP	0–3 PO	—

Source: Japan Wrestling

==== Pool 3 ====
Pos	Athlete	Pld	W	L	CP	TP	KOR	EST	NED
1	Kim Jin-soo (KOR)	2	2	0	7	15	—	4–0	11–0
2	Tõnis Naarits (EST)	2	1	1	4	10	0–3 PO	—	10–0
3	Fred de Vos (NED)	2	0	2	0	0	0–4 ST	0–4 ST	—

Source: Japan Wrestling

==== Pool 4 ====
Pos	Athlete	Pld	W	L	CP	TP	GRE	IRI	GER
1	Dimitrios Avramis (GRE)	2	2	0	6	6	—	3–1	3–0
2	Majid Ramezani (IRI)	2	1	1	4	7	1–3 PP	—	6–4
3	Christian Hasenstab (GER)	2	0	2	1	4	0–3 PO	1–3 PP	—

Source: Japan Wrestling

==== Pool 5 ====
Pos	Athlete	Pld	W	L	CP	TP	HUN	BLR	LTU
1	Tamás Berzicza (HUN)	2	2	0	6	6	—	3–1	3–0
2	Aliaksei Panysh (BLR)	2	1	1	4	5	1–3 PP	—	4–3
3	Artur Stankevič (LTU)	2	0	2	1	3	0–3 PO	1–3 PP	—

Source: Japan Wrestling

==== Pool 6 ====
Pos	Athlete	Pld	W	L	CP	TP	USA	ITA	IND
1	Keith Sieracki (USA)	2	2	0	7	17	—	4–0	13–0
2	Andrea Minguzzi (ITA)	2	1	1	4	13	0–3 PO	—	13–0
3	Suraj Mal (IND)	2	0	2	0	0	0–4 ST	0–4 ST	—

Source: Japan Wrestling

==== Pool 7 ====
Pos	Athlete	Pld	W	L	CP	TP	RUS	ROM	KGZ
1	Aleksey Mishin (RUS)	2	2	0	7	16	—	6–0	10–0
2	Cristian Rusu (ROM)	2	1	1	3	3	0–3 PO	—	3–0
3	Janbolot Musaev (KGZ)	2	0	2	0	0	0–4 ST	0–3 PO	—

Source: Japan Wrestling

==== Pool 8 ====
Pos	Athlete	Pld	W	L	CP	TP	UKR	ISR	TPE
1	Sergiy Solodkyy (UKR)	2	2	0	8	16	—	5–0 Fall	11–0
2	Yasha Manasherov (ISR)	2	1	1	4	12	0–4 TO	—	12–0
3	Chang Hsein-sheng (TPE)	2	0	2	0	0	0–4 ST	0–4 ST	—

Source: Japan Wrestling

==== Pool 9 ====
Pos	Athlete	Pld	W	L	CP	TP	KAZ	YUG	GEO
1	Bakhtiyar Baiseitov (KAZ)	2	2	0	7	13	—	10–0 Fall	3–2
2	Akoš Korica (YUG)	2	1	1	4	4	0–4 TO	—	4–0 DQ
3	Giorgi Jinjvelashvili (GEO)	2	0	2	1	2	1–3 PP	0–4 EV	—

Source: Japan Wrestling

==== Pool 10 ====
Pos	Athlete	Pld	W	L	CP	TP	SWE	UZB	CAN
1	Ara Abrahamian (SWE)	2	2	0	8	16	—	10–0	6–0 Fall
2	Yury Vitt (UZB)	2	1	1	4	10	0–4 ST	—	10–0
3	Scott Seeley (CAN)	2	0	2	0	0	0–4 TO	0–4 ST	—

Source: Japan Wrestling

==== Pool 11 ====
Pos	Athlete	Pld	W	L	CP	TP	CUB	CHN	AZE	MEX
1	Odelis Herrero (CUB)	3	3	0	12	27	—	5–0 Fall	11–0	11–0
2	Wang Gang (CHN)	3	2	1	6	10	0–4 TO	—	6–3	4–3
3	Rashad Mansurov (AZE)	3	1	2	4	6	0–4 ST	1–3 PP	—	3–0
4	Matías Hernández (MEX)	3	0	3	1	3	0–4 ST	1–3 PP	0–3 PO	—

Source: Japan Wrestling

=== Knockout round ===
Round of 16
Marko Yli-Hannuksela (FIN)	4
Artur Michalkiewicz (POL)	1
Kim Jin-soo (KOR)	4
Dimitrios Avramis (GRE)	0
Tamás Berzicza (HUN)	3
Keith Sieracki (USA)	0

Quarterfinals
Marko Yli-Hannuksela (FIN)	0
Kim Jin-soo (KOR)	3
Tamás Berzicza (HUN)	1
Aleksey Mishin (RUS)	4
Sergiy Solodkyy (UKR)	5
Bakhtiyar Baiseitov (KAZ)	0
Ara Abrahamian (SWE)	6
Odelis Herrero (CUB)	0

Semifinals
Kim Jin-soo (KOR)	2
Aleksey Mishin (RUS)	3
Sergiy Solodkyy (UKR)	0
Ara Abrahamian (SWE)	4

Final
Aleksey Mishin (RUS)	0
Ara Abrahamian (SWE)	5^{F}
Bronze medal match
Kim Jin-soo (KOR)	3
Sergiy Solodkyy (UKR)	0
