= Wrestling at the 1992 Summer Olympics – Men's Greco-Roman 74 kg =

Men's Greco-Roman 74 kg at the Games of the XXV Olympiad
- Venue: Institut Nacional d'Educació Física de Catalunya
- Dates: 27–29 July 1992
- Competitors: 21 from 21 nations

Medalists
1st place, gold medalist(s)		Mnatsakan Iskandaryan	Unified Team
2nd place, silver medalist(s)		Józef Tracz	Poland
3rd place, bronze medalist(s)		Torbjörn Kornbakk	Sweden

The men's Greco-Roman 74 kilograms at the 1992 Summer Olympics as part of the wrestling program were held at the Institut Nacional d'Educació Física de Catalunya from July 27 to July 29. The wrestlers are divided into 2 groups. The winner of each group decided by a double-elimination system.

== Results ==
Legend

- WO — Won by walkover

=== Elimination A ===
==== Round 1 ====
	Score		CP
Anton Marchl (AUT)	11–3	Youssef Bouguerra (ALG)	3–1 PP
Torbjörn Kornbakk (SWE)	5–2	Erhan Balcı (TUR)	3–1 PP
Ahad Javansalehi (IRI)	0–4	Jaroslav Zeman (TCH)	0–3 PO
Ender Memet (ROM)	0–1	Tuomo Karila (FIN)	0–3 PO
Józef Tracz (POL)	2–0	Željko Trajković (IOP)	3–0 PO
José Alberto Recuero (ESP)		Bye	

==== Round 2 ====
	Score		CP
José Alberto Recuero (ESP)	1–4	Anton Marchl (AUT)	1–3 PP
Youssef Bouguerra (ALG)	1–17	Torbjörn Kornbakk (SWE)	0–4 ST
Erhan Balcı (TUR)	2–0	Ahad Javansalehi (IRI)	3–0 PO
Jaroslav Zeman (TCH)	12–0	Ender Memet (ROM)	3.5–0 SO
Tuomo Karila (FIN)	1–2	Józef Tracz (POL)	1–3 PP
Željko Trajković (IOP)		Bye	

==== Round 3 ====
	Score		CP
Željko Trajković (IOP)	3–0	José Alberto Recuero (ESP)	3–0 PO
Anton Marchl (AUT)	1–5	Torbjörn Kornbakk (SWE)	1–3 PP
Erhan Balcı (TUR)	2–1	Tuomo Karila (FIN)	3–1 PP
Jaroslav Zeman (TCH)	4–5	Józef Tracz (POL)	1–3 PP

==== Round 4 ====
	Score		CP
Željko Trajković (IOP)	2–5	Anton Marchl (AUT)	1–3 PP
Torbjörn Kornbakk (SWE)	4–2	Jaroslav Zeman (TCH)	3–1 PP
Erhan Balcı (TUR)	1–5	Józef Tracz (POL)	1–3 PP

==== Round 5 ====
	Score		CP
Anton Marchl (AUT)	0–5	Józef Tracz (POL)	0–3 PO
Torbjörn Kornbakk (SWE)		Bye	

==== Round 6 ====
	Score		CP
Torbjörn Kornbakk (SWE)	0–3 Fall	Józef Tracz (POL)	0–4 TO
Anton Marchl (AUT)		Bye	

==== Summary ====
Pos	Athlete	Pld	W	L	R	CP	TP
1	Józef Tracz (POL)	6	6	0	X (Note: Classification points: POL 7, SWE 3, AUT 1)	19	22
2	Torbjörn Kornbakk (SWE)	5	4	1	X	13	31
3	Anton Marchl (AUT)	5	3	2	X	10	21
4	Jaroslav Zeman (TCH)	4	2	2	4	8.5	22
5	Erhan Balcı (TUR)	4	2	2	4	8	7
—	Željko Trajković (IOP)	3	1	2	4	4	5
—	Tuomo Karila (FIN)	3	1	2	3	5	3
—	José Alberto Recuero (ESP)	2	0	2	3	1	1
—	Youssef Bouguerra (ALG)	2	0	2	2	1	4
—	Ahad Javansalehi (IRI)	2	0	2	2	0	0
—	Ender Memet (ROM)	2	0	2	2	0	0

Source: Official Report

=== Elimination B ===
==== Round 1 ====
	Score		CP
Mnatsakan Iskandaryan (EUN)	9–3	Travis West (USA)	3–1 PP
János Takács (HUN)	0–2	Karlo Kasap (CAN)	0–3 PO
Petros Triantafyllidis (GRE)	0–5	Néstor Almanza (CUB)	0–3 PO
Yvon Riemer (FRA)	8–0 Fall	Wei Qingkun (CHN)	4–0 TO
Dobri Ivanov (BUL)	6–1	Paulo Martins (POR)	3–1 PP

==== Round 2 ====
	Score		CP
Mnatsakan Iskandaryan (EUN)	8–0	János Takács (HUN)	3–0 PO
Travis West (USA)	2–3	Karlo Kasap (CAN)	1–3 PP
Petros Triantafyllidis (GRE)	0–8	Yvon Riemer (FRA)	0–3 PO
Néstor Almanza (CUB)	3–2	Dobri Ivanov (BUL)	3–1 PP
Wei Qingkun (CHN)	16–0	Paulo Martins (POR)	4–0 ST

==== Round 3 ====
	Score		CP
Mnatsakan Iskandaryan (EUN)	9–1	Karlo Kasap (CAN)	3–1 PP
Néstor Almanza (CUB)	2–0	Yvon Riemer (FRA)	3–0 PO
Wei Qingkun (CHN)	0–9	Dobri Ivanov (BUL)	0–3 PO

==== Round 4 ====
	Score		CP
Mnatsakan Iskandaryan (EUN)	5–0	Néstor Almanza (CUB)	3–0 PO
Karlo Kasap (CAN)	0–13	Yvon Riemer (FRA)	0–3.5 SO
Dobri Ivanov (BUL)		Bye	

==== Round 5 ====
	Score		CP
Dobri Ivanov (BUL)	1–9	Mnatsakan Iskandaryan (EUN)	1–3 PP
Néstor Almanza (CUB)		Bye	
Yvon Riemer (FRA)		Bye	

==== Round 6 ====
	Score		CP
Yvon Riemer (FRA)	1–7	Mnatsakan Iskandaryan (EUN)	1–3 PP
Néstor Almanza (CUB)		Bye	

==== Summary ====
Pos	Athlete	Pld	W	L	R	CP	TP
1	Mnatsakan Iskandaryan (EUN)	6	6	0	X (Note: Classification points: EUN 6, CUB 3, FRA 1)	18	47
2	Néstor Almanza (CUB)	4	3	1	X	9	10
3	Yvon Riemer (FRA)	5	3	2	X	11.5	30
4	Dobri Ivanov (BUL)	4	2	2	5	8	18
5	Karlo Kasap (CAN)	4	2	2	4	7	6
—	Wei Qingkun (CHN)	3	1	2	3	4	16
—	Travis West (USA)	2	0	2	2	2	5
—	Paulo Martins (POR)	2	0	2	2	1	1
—	Petros Triantafyllidis (GRE)	2	0	2	2	0	0
—	János Takács (HUN)	2	0	2	2	0	0

Source: Official Report

=== Finals ===
	Score		CP
9th place match
Erhan Balcı (TUR)	0–2	Karlo Kasap (CAN)	0–3 PO
7th place match
Jaroslav Zeman (TCH)	WO	Dobri Ivanov (BUL)	4–0 EF
5th place match
Anton Marchl (AUT)	0–12	Yvon Riemer (FRA)	0–3.5 SO
Bronze medal match
Torbjörn Kornbakk (SWE)	5–1	Néstor Almanza (CUB)	3–1 PP
Gold medal match
Józef Tracz (POL)	3–6	Mnatsakan Iskandaryan (EUN)	1–3 PP

== Final standing ==
Rank	Athlete
1st place, gold medalist(s)	Mnatsakan Iskandaryan (EUN)
2nd place, silver medalist(s)	Józef Tracz (POL)
3rd place, bronze medalist(s)	Torbjörn Kornbakk (SWE)
4	Néstor Almanza (CUB)
5	Yvon Riemer (FRA)
6	Anton Marchl (AUT)
7	Jaroslav Zeman (TCH)
8	Karlo Kasap (CAN)
9	Erhan Balcı (TUR)
10	Wei Qingkun (CHN)
