= Wrestling at the 1996 Summer Olympics – Men's Greco-Roman 74 kg =

Men's Greco-Roman 74 kg at the Games of the XXVI Olympiad
- Venue: Georgia World Congress Center
- Dates: 22–23 July
- Competitors: 20 from 20 nations

Medalists
1st place, gold medalist(s)		Filiberto Azcuy	Cuba
2nd place, silver medalist(s)		Marko Asell	Finland
3rd place, bronze medalist(s)		Józef Tracz	Poland

The men's Greco-Roman 74 kilograms at the 1996 Summer Olympics as part of the wrestling program were held at the Georgia World Congress Center from July 22 to July 23. The gold and silver medalists were determined by the final match of the main single-elimination bracket. The losers advanced to the repechage. These matches determined the bronze medalist for the event.

== Results ==
Legend

- WO — Won by walkover

=== Round 1 ===
	Score		CP
1/16 finals
Aziz Khalfi (MAR)	0–7	Jaroslav Zeman (CZE)	0–3 PO
Józef Tracz (POL)	0–1	Tamás Berzicza (HUN)	0–3 PO
Gordy Morgan (USA)	10–0	Rodolfo Hernández (MEX)	4–0 ST
Filiberto Azcuy (CUB)	9–1	Bakhtiyar Baiseitov (KAZ)	3–1 PP
Mnatsakan Iskandaryan (RUS)	10–0	Nestor García (VEN)	4–0 ST
Kim Jin-soo (KOR)	11–0	Torbjörn Kornbakk (SWE)	4–0 ST
Artur Dzyhasov (UKR)	3–0	Nazmi Avluca (TUR)	3–0 PO
Vladimir Kopytov (BLR)	2–4	Erik Hahn (GER)	1–3 PP
Takamitsu Katayama (JPN)	13–2	Youssef Bouguerra (ALG)	4–1 SP
Stoyan Stoyanov (BUL)	2–4	Marko Asell (FIN)	1–3 PP

=== Round 2 ===
	Score		CP
1/8 finals
Jaroslav Zeman (CZE)	1–5	Tamás Berzicza (HUN)	1–3 PP
Gordy Morgan (USA)	1–10	Filiberto Azcuy (CUB)	1–3 PP
Mnatsakan Iskandaryan (RUS)	4–0	Kim Jin-soo (KOR)	3–0 PO
Artur Dzyhasov (UKR)	2–1	Erik Hahn (GER)	3–1 PP
Takamitsu Katayama (JPN)	2–4	Marko Asell (FIN)	1–3 PP
Repechage
Aziz Khalfi (MAR)	2–9	Józef Tracz (POL)	1–3 PP
Rodolfo Hernández (MEX)	0–6 Fall	Bakhtiyar Baiseitov (KAZ)	0–4 TO
Nestor García (VEN)	1–9	Torbjörn Kornbakk (SWE)	1–3 PP
Nazmi Avluca (TUR)	3–2	Vladimir Kopytov (BLR)	3–1 PP
Youssef Bouguerra (ALG)	0–5	Stoyan Stoyanov (BUL)	0–3 PO

=== Round 3 ===
	Score		CP
Quarterfinals
Tamás Berzicza (HUN)	2–6	Filiberto Azcuy (CUB)	1–3 PP
Mnatsakan Iskandaryan (RUS)		Bye	
Artur Dzyhasov (UKR)		Bye	
Marko Asell (FIN)		Bye	
Repechage
Józef Tracz (POL)	2–1	Bakhtiyar Baiseitov (KAZ)	3–1 PP
Torbjörn Kornbakk (SWE)	2–0	Nazmi Avluca (TUR)	3–0 PO
Stoyan Stoyanov (BUL)	5–0	Jaroslav Zeman (CZE)	3–0 PO
Gordy Morgan (USA)	2–3	Kim Jin-soo (KOR)	1–3 PP
Erik Hahn (GER)	5–2	Takamitsu Katayama (JPN)	3–1 PP

=== Round 4 ===
	Score		CP
Semifinals
Filiberto Azcuy (CUB)	5–4	Mnatsakan Iskandaryan (RUS)	3–1 PP
Artur Dzyhasov (UKR)	0–10	Marko Asell (FIN)	0–4 ST
Repechage
Józef Tracz (POL)	6–0	Torbjörn Kornbakk (SWE)	3–0 PO
Stoyan Stoyanov (BUL)	5–0 Ret	Kim Jin-soo (KOR)	4–0 PA
Erik Hahn (GER)	3–1	Tamás Berzicza (HUN)	3–1 PP

=== Round 5 ===
	Score		CP
Repechage
Józef Tracz (POL)	4–2	Stoyan Stoyanov (BUL)	3–1 PP
Erik Hahn (GER)		Bye	

=== Round 6 ===
	Score		CP
Repechage
Mnatsakan Iskandaryan (RUS)	5–8	Erik Hahn (GER)	1–3 PP
Józef Tracz (POL)	3–1	Artur Dzyhasov (UKR)	3–1 PP

=== Finals ===
	Score		CP
Classification 7th–8th
Stoyan Stoyanov (BUL)	WO	Tamás Berzicza (HUN)	0–4 EF
Classification 5th–6th
Mnatsakan Iskandaryan (RUS)	WO	Artur Dzyhasov (UKR)	4–0 EF
Bronze medal match
Erik Hahn (GER)	2–4	Józef Tracz (POL)	1–3 PP
Gold medal match
Filiberto Azcuy (CUB)	8–2	Marko Asell (FIN)	3–1 PP

== Final standing ==
Rank	Athlete
1st place, gold medalist(s)	Filiberto Azcuy (CUB)
2nd place, silver medalist(s)	Marko Asell (FIN)
3rd place, bronze medalist(s)	Józef Tracz (POL)
4	Erik Hahn (GER)
5	Mnatsakan Iskandaryan (RUS)
6	Tamás Berzicza (HUN)
7	Kim Jin-soo (KOR)
8	Takamitsu Katayama (JPN)
9	Gordy Morgan (USA)
10	Torbjörn Kornbakk (SWE)
11	Bakhtiyar Baiseitov (KAZ)
12	Jaroslav Zeman (CZE)
13	Nazmi Avluca (TUR)
14	Vladimir Kopytov (BLR)
15	Aziz Khalfi (MAR)
16	Youssef Bouguerra (ALG)
17	Nestor García (VEN)
18	Rodolfo Hernández (MEX)
DQ	Stoyan Stoyanov (BUL)
DQ	Artur Dzyhasov (UKR)

- Stoyan Stoyanov and Artur Dzyhasov were disqualified after they failed to appear for the classification matches.
