= Wrestling at the 2000 Summer Olympics – Men's Greco-Roman 76 kg =

Men's Greco-Roman 76 kg at the Games of the XXVII Olympiad
- Venue: Sydney Convention and Exhibition Centre
- Date: 24–26 September 2000
- Competitors: 20 from 20 nations

Medalists
1st place, gold medalist(s)		Murat Kardanov	Russia
2nd place, silver medalist(s)		Matt Lindland	United States
3rd place, bronze medalist(s)		Marko Yli-Hannuksela	Finland

The men's Greco-Roman 76 kilograms at the 2000 Summer Olympics as part of the wrestling program was held at the Sydney Convention and Exhibition Centre from September 24 to 26. The competition held with an elimination system of three or four wrestlers in each pool, with the winners qualify for the quarterfinals, semifinals and final by way of direct elimination.

== Schedule ==
All times are Australian Eastern Daylight Time (UTC+11:00)

Date	Time	Event
24 September 2000	09:30	Round 1
24 September 2000	17:00	Round 2
24 September 2000	17:00	Round 3
25 September 2000	09:30	Quarterfinals
25 September 2000	17:00	Semifinals
26 September 2000	17:00	Finals

== Results ==
Legend

- WO — Won by walkover

=== Elimination pools ===
==== Pool 1 ====
Pos	Athlete	Pld	W	L	CP	TP	Qualification
1	Kim Jin-soo (KOR)	2	2	0	6	6	Knockout round
2	Nazmi Avluca (TUR)	2	1	1	4	4	
3	Khvicha Bichinashvili (AZE)	2	0	2	1	2	

Source: Official Report

	Score		CP
Khvicha Bichinashvili (AZE)	2–3	Kim Jin-soo (KOR)	1–3 PP
Nazmi Avluca (TUR)	3–0	Khvicha Bichinashvili (AZE)	3–0 PO
Kim Jin-soo (KOR)	3–1	Nazmi Avluca (TUR)	3–1 PP

==== Pool 2 ====
Pos	Athlete	Pld	W	L	CP	TP	Qualification
1	Marko Yli-Hannuksela (FIN)	2	2	0	6	8	Knockout round
2	Bakhtiyar Baiseitov (KAZ)	2	1	1	4	7	
3	Yvon Riemer (FRA)	2	0	2	2	3	

Source: Official Report

	Score		CP
Marko Yli-Hannuksela (FIN)	4–1	Yvon Riemer (FRA)	3–1 PP
Bakhtiyar Baiseitov (KAZ)	3–4	Marko Yli-Hannuksela (FIN)	1–3 PP
Yvon Riemer (FRA)	2–4	Bakhtiyar Baiseitov (KAZ)	1–3 PP

==== Pool 3 ====
Pos	Athlete	Pld	W	L	CP	TP	Qualification
1	Murat Kardanov (RUS)	2	2	0	6	5	Knockout round
2	Tamás Berzicza (HUN)	2	1	1	3	2	
3	Takamitsu Katayama (JPN)	2	0	2	1	2	

Source: Official Report

	Score		CP
Takamitsu Katayama (JPN)	0–4	Murat Kardanov (RUS)	0–3 PP
Tamás Berzicza (HUN)	2–2	Takamitsu Katayama (JPN)	3–1 PP
Murat Kardanov (RUS)	1–0	Tamás Berzicza (HUN)	3–0 PO

==== Pool 4 ====
Pos	Athlete	Pld	W	L	CP	TP	Qualification
1	Ara Abrahamian (SWE)	2	2	0	6	6	Knockout round
2	Dimitrios Avramis (GRE)	2	1	1	4	5	
3	Levon Geghamyan (ARM)	2	0	2	1	1	

Source: Official Report

	Score		CP
Levon Geghamyan (ARM)	1–3	Dimitrios Avramis (GRE)	1–3 PP
Ara Abrahamian (SWE)	3–0	Levon Geghamyan (ARM)	3–0 PO
Dimitrios Avramis (GRE)	2–3	Ara Abrahamian (SWE)	1–3 PP

==== Pool 5 ====
Pos	Athlete	Pld	W	L	CP	TP	Qualification
1	David Manukyan (UKR)	3	3	0	11	35	Knockout round
2	Viachaslau Makaranka (BLR)	3	2	1	8	47	
3	Artur Michalkiewicz (POL)	3	1	2	6	14	
4	Faafetai Iutana (SAM)	3	0	3	0	0	

Source: Official Report

	Score		CP
Faafetai Iutana (SAM)	0–11 Fall	Artur Michalkiewicz (POL)	0–4 TO
David Manukyan (UKR)	12–1	Viachaslau Makaranka (BLR)	4–1 SP
Faafetai Iutana (SAM)	0–15 Fall	David Manukyan (UKR)	0–4 TO
Artur Michalkiewicz (POL)	1–4	Viachaslau Makaranka (BLR)	1–3 PP
Faafetai Iutana (SAM)	0–42 Fall	Viachaslau Makaranka (BLR)	0–4 TO
Artur Michalkiewicz (POL)	2–8	David Manukyan (UKR)	1–3 PP

==== Pool 6 ====
Pos	Athlete	Pld	W	L	CP	TP	Qualification
1	Matt Lindland (USA)	3	3	0	10	10	Knockout round
2	Tarieli Melelashvili (GEO)	3	2	1	7	4	
3	Evgeniy Erofaylov (UZB)	3	1	2	4	7	
4	Kader Slila (ALG)	3	0	3	0	0	

Source: Official Report

	Score		CP
Kader Slila (ALG)	0–6	Evgeniy Erofaylov (UZB)	0–3 PO
Matt Lindland (USA)	3–0	Tarieli Melelashvili (GEO)	3–0 PO
Kader Slila (ALG)	0–6 Ret	Matt Lindland (USA)	0–4 PA
Evgeniy Erofaylov (UZB)	0–4	Tarieli Melelashvili (GEO)	0–3 PO
Kader Slila (ALG)	WO	Tarieli Melelashvili (GEO)	0–4 PA
Evgeniy Erofaylov (UZB)	1–1	Matt Lindland (USA)	1–3 PP

=== Knockout round ===
Quarterfinals
Kim Jin-soo (KOR)	0
Marko Yli-Hannuksela (FIN)	3
Murat Kardanov (RUS)	3
Ara Abrahamian (SWE)	1

Semifinals
Marko Yli-Hannuksela (FIN)	0
Murat Kardanov (RUS)	4
David Manukyan (UKR)	4
Matt Lindland (USA)	7

Gold medal match
Murat Kardanov (RUS)	3
Matt Lindland (USA)	0
Bronze medal match
Marko Yli-Hannuksela (FIN)	4
David Manukyan (UKR)	2

Classification 5th–6th
Kim Jin-soo (KOR)	9
Ara Abrahamian (SWE)	0

== Final standing ==
Rank	Athlete
1st place, gold medalist(s)	Murat Kardanov (RUS)
2nd place, silver medalist(s)	Matt Lindland (USA)
3rd place, bronze medalist(s)	Marko Yli-Hannuksela (FIN)
4	David Manukyan (UKR)
5	Kim Jin-soo (KOR)
6	Ara Abrahamian (SWE)
7	Viachaslau Makaranka (BLR)
8	Tarieli Melelashvili (GEO)
9	Artur Michalkiewicz (POL)
10	Bakhtiyar Baiseitov (KAZ)
11	Evgeniy Erofaylov (UZB)
12	Dimitrios Avramis (GRE)
13	Nazmi Avluca (TUR)
14	Tamás Berzicza (HUN)
15	Yvon Riemer (FRA)
16	Khvicha Bichinashvili (AZE)
17	Takamitsu Katayama (JPN)
18	Levon Geghamyan (ARM)
19	Faafetai Iutana (SAM)
20	Kader Slila (ALG)
