= Paulo Martins (wrestler) =

Portuguese wrestler

Personal information
- Full name: Paulo Jorge Martins
- Nationality: Portuguese
- Born: 3 February 1970 (age 56) Porto Santo, Portugal

Sport
- Sport: Wrestling

Paulo Jorge Martins (born 3 February 1970) is a Portuguese wrestler. As a wrestler, Martins would compete in various competitions such as the 1991 European Wrestling Championships, 1991 World Wrestling Championships, and 1992 European Wrestling Championships. He mostly competed in Greco-Roman wrestling.

Martins would then compete at his first and only Olympic Games, representing Portugal in men's wrestling at the 1992 Summer Olympics. He would compete in the men's Greco-Roman 74 kilogram category and would advance until his elimination in the second round.

== Biography ==
Paulo Jorge Martins was born on 3 February 1970 in Porto Santo in Madeira, Portugal. As a wrestler, Martins would compete at the 1991 European Wrestling Championships in Aschaffenburg, Germany. There, he would place tenth in the men's Greco-Roman 74 kilogram category. He would also compete at the 1991 World Wrestling Championships in Varna, Bulgaria. He would place 21st men's Greco-Roman 74 kilogram category.

In 1992, he would compete at the 1992 European Wrestling Championships in Copenhagen, Denmark, in the men's freestyle 74 kilogram category. There, he would place 19th. Martins would then compete at his first and only Olympic Games. He would compete at the 1992 Summer Olympics in Barcelona, Spain, representing Portugal in men's wrestling.

He would compete in the first round of the men's Greco-Roman 74 kilogram category on 27 July. There, he would be defeated by Dobri Ivanov of Bulgaria but would earn a single point to advance him to the second round. In the second round, he would be defeated by Wei Qingkun of China and would earn no points. He was eliminated from the event and would not advance further. Overall, he would be unranked in the event.
