= Takamitsu Katayama =

Japanese wrestler (born 1971)

Personal information
- Full name: Takamitsu Katayama
- Nationality: Japanese
- Born: 29 September 1971 (age 55) Akita, Japan
- Height: 1.70 m (5 ft 7 in)
- Weight: 76 kg (168 lb)

Sport
- Style: Greco-Roman
- Club: Sports Club of Self-Defense Forces
- Coach: Yasutoshi Moriyama
Medal record
Men's Greco-Roman wrestling
Representing Japan
Asian Games
Silver medal – second place	1998 Bangkok	76 kg
Bronze medal – third place	1994 Hiroshima	74 kg
Asian Championships
Gold medal – first place	1997 Tehran	76 kg
Silver medal – second place	1996 Xiaoshan	74 kg
Silver medal – second place	2000 Seoul	76 kg
Bronze medal – third place	1995 Manila	74 kg
Bronze medal – third place	1999 Tehran	76 kg

Takamitsu Katayama (片山 貴光, Katayama Takamitsu; born 21 September 1971) is a Japanese former amateur Greco-Roman wrestler, who competed in the men's middleweight category. Katayama wrestled for the Japanese squad in two editions of the Summer Olympics (1996 and 2000), finishing eighth in Atlanta and seventeenth in Sydney, respectively. Outside the Games, Katayama produced a career tally of seven medals in a major international competition, two of which were awarded at the Asian Games (1994 and 1998). Katayama was also a member of the national wrestling squad under coach and three-time Olympian Yasutoshi Moriyama, while training full time at the Sports Club of Self-Defense Forces in Saitama Prefecture.

Katayama came to prominence in international wrestling, when his country Japan hosted the 1994 Asian Games held in Hiroshima. There, he rounded off the podium with a bronze over Iranian wrestler and 1992 Olympian Ahad Javansalehi in the 74-kg division.

At his maiden Olympics in Atlanta 1996, Katayama started the competition in the men's welterweight category (74 kg) with a powerful 13–2 triumph over Algeria's Youcef Bouguerra, before falling behind Finland's eventual silver medalist Marko Asell in his next bout by a 2–4 verdict. Facing German opponent Erik Hahn on the losers' circle, Katayama could not hold him tightly on the mat and lost the match 2–5. Originally placed tenth, Katayama upgraded his position to eighth, as two other wrestlers decided to forfeit the final consolation round.

Katayama reached the peak of his wrestling career by winning the gold medal at the 1997 Asian Championships in Tehran, Iran. When he entered the 1998 Asian Games with the best chance to top the podium in the 76 kg category, Katayama narrowly missed a single point to subdue his Kazakh opponent Bakhtiyar Baiseitov (4–5) for gold in the final match, ending his second Asiad with a silver.

At the 2000 Summer Olympics in Sydney, Katayama qualified for his second Japanese team in the men's middleweight division (76 kg) by placing seventh and securing a berth at the third Olympic Qualification Tournament in Alexandria, Egypt. Unlike his previous Games, Katayama lost his opening match 0–4 to the eventual champion Murat Kardanov of Russia and could not rally for points to break a 2–2 draw against Hungary's Tamás Berzicza upon the referee's decision, dropping him to the bottom of the prelim pool and seventeenth overall in the final standings.

Shortly after the Games, Katayama retired from competitive wrestling to serve in the Japan Ground Self-Defense Force.
