= 2000 Asian Wrestling Championships =

Freestyle
- Host city: Guilin, China
- Dates: 26–28 April 2000
- Stadium: Guilin Sports Center

Greco-Roman
- Host city: Seoul, South Korea
- Dates: 5–7 May 2000
- Stadium: Olympic Fencing Gymnasium

Women
- Host city: Seoul, South Korea
- Dates: 5–7 May 2000
- Stadium: Olympic Fencing Gymnasium

Champions
- Freestyle: Uzbekistan
- Greco-Roman: South Korea
- Women: Japan

The following is the final results of the 2000 Asian Wrestling Championships.

== Medal table ==
Rank	Nation	Gold	Silver	Bronze	Total
1	Uzbekistan	6	3	3	12
2	Japan	6	2	1	9
3	China	2	3	5	10
4	South Korea	2	3	3	8
5	Kazakhstan	2	2	0	4
6	North Korea	2	0	1	3
7	Iran	1	4	6	11
8	Kyrgyzstan	1	2	0	3
9	Chinese Taipei	0	2	1	3
10	Mongolia	0	1	1	2
11	India	0	0	1	1
Totals (11 entries)		22	22	22	66

== Team ranking ==
Rank	Men's freestyle		Men's Greco-Roman		Women's freestyle	
Rank	Team	Points	Team	Points	Team	Points
1	Uzbekistan	76	South Korea	59	Japan	59
2	Iran	57	Iran	57	China	51
3	China	42	Uzbekistan	53	South Korea	41
4	Japan	39	China	51	Chinese Taipei	38
5	South Korea	37	Japan	47	Mongolia	26
6	India	37	Kazakhstan	45	Kyrgyzstan	15
7	Mongolia	35	Kyrgyzstan	31	Turkmenistan	12
8	North Korea	33	India	23		
9	Kazakhstan	18	Syria	18		
10	Kyrgyzstan	18	Mongolia	17		

== Medal summary ==
=== Men's freestyle ===
Event	Gold	Silver	Bronze
54 kg	Jin Ju-dong; North Korea	Mohammad Aslani; Iran	Adkhamjon Achilov; Uzbekistan
58 kg	Ri Yong-sam; North Korea	Damir Zakhartdinov; Uzbekistan	Song Jae-myung; South Korea
63 kg	Ramil Islamov; Uzbekistan	Baek Jin-kuk; South Korea	Kim Kwang-il; North Korea
69 kg	Igor Kupeev; Uzbekistan	Mehdi Baraati; Iran	Sujeet Maan; India
76 kg	Ruslan Khinchagov; Uzbekistan	Tümen-Ölziin Mönkhbayar; Mongolia	Masoud Jamshidi; Iran
85 kg	Rasul Katinovasov; Uzbekistan	Bolotbek Omurakunov; Kyrgyzstan	Takenori Yokoyama; Japan
97 kg	Islam Bayramukov; Kazakhstan	Soslan Fraev; Uzbekistan	Mohammad Javad Rasekhi; Iran
130 kg	Artur Taymazov; Uzbekistan	Chen Xingqiang; China	Alireza Rezaei; Iran

=== Men's Greco-Roman ===
Event	Gold	Silver	Bronze
54 kg	Ha Tae-yeon; South Korea	Askar Zhursymbayev; Kazakhstan	Hassan Rangraz; Iran
58 kg	Ali Ashkani; Iran	Dilshod Aripov; Uzbekistan	Wang Hui; China
63 kg	Bakhodir Kurbanov; Uzbekistan	Lee Tae-ho; South Korea	Yi Shanjun; China
69 kg	Katsuhiko Nagata; Japan	Parviz Zeidvand; Iran	Zhang Xiling; China
76 kg	Bakhtiyar Baiseitov; Kazakhstan	Takamitsu Katayama; Japan	Hossein Marashian; Iran
85 kg	Raatbek Sanatbayev; Kyrgyzstan	Seo Sang-myun; South Korea	Yury Vitt; Uzbekistan
97 kg	Park Woo; South Korea	Sergey Matviyenko; Kazakhstan	Rasoul Jazini; Iran
130 kg	Zhao Hailin; China	Alireza Gharibi; Iran	Shuhrat Sadiev; Uzbekistan

=== Women's freestyle ===
Event	Gold	Silver	Bronze
46 kg	Shoko Yoshimura; Japan	Kao Wei-chien; Chinese Taipei	Chi Lina; China
51 kg	Hitomi Sakamoto; Japan	Yin Min; China	Chang Wen-hsia; Chinese Taipei
56 kg	Mariko Shimizu; Japan	Lin Chin-miao; Chinese Taipei	Cao Haiying; China
62 kg	Ayako Shoda; Japan	Meng Lili; China	Seo Mi-suk; South Korea
68 kg	Tomoe Miyamoto; Japan	Yana Panova; Kyrgyzstan	Jung Yeon-hee; South Korea
75 kg	Jiang Xueyan; China	Taeko Tomioka; Japan	Choijidyn Davaabond; Mongolia

== Participating nations ==
=== Men's freestyle ===
84 competitors from 16 nations competed.

- China (8)
- Chinese Taipei (4)
- India (8)
- Indonesia (2)
- Iran (8)
- Japan (7)
- Kazakhstan (4)
- Kyrgyzstan (5)
- Malaysia (2)
- Mongolia (6)
- North Korea (4)
- Pakistan (3)
- South Korea (8)
- Syria (3)
- Uzbekistan (8)
- Vietnam (4)

=== Men's Greco-Roman ===
84 competitors from 15 nations competed.

- China (8)
- Chinese Taipei (7)
- India (7)
- Indonesia (4)
- Iran (8)
- Japan (8)
- Kazakhstan (8)
- Kyrgyzstan (5)
- Mongolia (5)
- South Korea (8)
- Syria (4)
- Tajikistan (1)
- Turkmenistan (2)
- Uzbekistan (8)
- Yemen (1)

=== Women's freestyle ===
31 competitors from 7 nations competed.

- China (6)
- Chinese Taipei (5)
- Japan (6)
- Kyrgyzstan (2)
- Mongolia (4)
- South Korea (6)
- Turkmenistan (2)
