= Wrestling at the 1998 Asian Games – Men's Greco-Roman 76 kg =

Men's Greco-Roman 76 kg at the 1998 Asian Games
- Venue: Thammasat Gymnasium 1
- Dates: 12–13 December 1998
- Competitors: 10 from 10 nations

Medalists
gold medal	Bakhtiyar Baiseitov	Kazakhstan
silver medal	Takamitsu Katayama	Japan
bronze medal	Kim Jung-sub	South Korea

The men's Greco-Roman 76 kilograms wrestling competition at the 1998 Asian Games in Bangkok was held on 12 December and 13 December at the Thammasat Gymnasium 1.

The gold and silver medalists were determined by the final match of the main single-elimination bracket. The losers advanced to the repechage. These matches determined the bronze medalist for the event.

== Schedule ==
All times are Indochina Time (UTC+07:00)

Date	Time	Event
Saturday, 12 December 1998	09:00	Round 1
Saturday, 12 December 1998	16:00	Round 2
Saturday, 12 December 1998	16:00	Round 3
Sunday, 13 December 1998	09:00	Round 4
Sunday, 13 December 1998	16:00	Finals

== Results ==
=== Round 1 ===
	Score		CP
1/8 finals
Mohammad Al-Ken (SYR)	1–11	Yury Vitt (UZB)	1–4 SP
Bakhtiyar Baiseitov (KAZ)	4–0	Mehdi Rahimi (IRI)	3–0 PO
Kim Jung-sub (KOR)	10–0	Mẫn Bá Xuân (VIE)	4–0 ST
Noureddine El-Habeche (LIB)	0–4 Fall	Takamitsu Katayama (JPN)	0–4 TO
Sombat Tana (THA)	0–11	Bisolt Dezeev (KGZ)	0–4 ST

=== Round 2 ===
	Score		CP
Quarterfinals
Yury Vitt (UZB)	0–4 Fall	Bakhtiyar Baiseitov (KAZ)	0–4 TO
Kim Jung-sub (KOR)		Bye	
Takamitsu Katayama (JPN)		Bye	
Bisolt Dezeev (KGZ)		Bye	
Repechage
Mohammad Al-Ken (SYR)	11–3	Mehdi Rahimi (IRI)	3–1 PP
Mẫn Bá Xuân (VIE)	15–7	Noureddine El-Habeche (LIB)	3–1 PP
Sombat Tana (THA)		Bye	

=== Round 3 ===
	Score		CP
Semifinals
Bakhtiyar Baiseitov (KAZ)	3–0	Kim Jung-sub (KOR)	3–0 PO
Takamitsu Katayama (JPN)	10–0	Bisolt Dezeev (KGZ)	4–0 ST
Repechage
Sombat Tana (THA)	0–12	Mohammad Al-Ken (SYR)	0–4 ST
Mẫn Bá Xuân (VIE)	0–4 Fall	Yury Vitt (UZB)	0–4 TO

=== Round 4 ===
	Score		CP
Repechage
Kim Jung-sub (KOR)	2–0	Mohammad Al-Ken (SYR)	3–0 PO
Yury Vitt (UZB)	0–5	Bisolt Dezeev (KGZ)	0–3 PO

=== Finals ===
	Score		CP
Bronze medal match
Kim Jung-sub (KOR)	11–1	Bisolt Dezeev (KGZ)	4–1 SP
Gold medal match
Bakhtiyar Baiseitov (KAZ)	5–4	Takamitsu Katayama (JPN)	3–1 PP

== Final standing ==
Rank	Athlete
1st place, gold medalist(s)	Bakhtiyar Baiseitov (KAZ)
2nd place, silver medalist(s)	Takamitsu Katayama (JPN)
3rd place, bronze medalist(s)	Kim Jung-sub (KOR)
4	Bisolt Dezeev (KGZ)
5	Mohammad Al-Ken (SYR)
6	Yury Vitt (UZB)
7	Mẫn Bá Xuân (VIE)
8	Sombat Tana (THA)
9	Noureddine El-Habeche (LIB)
10	Mehdi Rahimi (IRI)
