= Rodolfo Hernández =

Rodolfo Hernández may refer to:

- Rodolfo Hernández Suárez (1945–2024), Colombian businessman/politician, 2022 presidential candidate
- Rodolfo Hernández (wrestler) (b. 1969), Mexican Olympic wrestler
- Rudy Hernández (shortstop) (born 1951), Mexican baseball player
- Rodolfo P. Hernández (1931–2013), United States soldier, Medal of Honor recipient
- Rodolfo Hernández Gómez (b. 1950), Costa Rican paediatrician, presidential candidate in the 2018 Costa Rican general election
