= 2006 World Wrestling Championships – Men's Greco-Roman 84 kg =

Men's Greco-Roman 84 kg at the 2006 World Championships
- Venue: Tianhe Gymnasium
- Dates: 26 September 2006
- Competitors: 36 from 36 nations

Medalists
gold medal	Mohamed Abdelfatah	Egypt
silver medal	Nazmi Avluca	Turkey
bronze medal	Aleksey Mishin	Russia
bronze medal	Saman Tahmasebi	Iran

The men's Greco-Roman 84 kilograms is a competition featured at the 2006 World Wrestling Championships, and was held at the Tianhe Gymnasium in Guangzhou, China on 26 September 2006.

== Results ==
Legend

- F — Won by fall

=== Finals ===
Semifinals			Final
Mohamed Abdelfatah (EGY)	4	2
Badri Khasaia (GEO)	0	0	Mohamed Abdelfatah (EGY)	1	1	1
Nazmi Avluca (TUR)	8	6	Nazmi Avluca (TUR)	1	1	1
Kim-Jussi Nurmela (FIN)	0	0

=== Top half ===
==== Section 1 ====
Round of 64

Round of 32
Hugues Bella-Lufu (RSA)	6	6
Joseph Ntege (UGA)	0	0
Attila Bátky (SVK)	0	0
Mohamed Abdelfatah (EGY)	3	3
Aleksey Mishin (RUS)	3	3
Denis Nikolaev (ISR)	0	0
Oleksandr Daragan (UKR)	0	0
Mélonin Noumonvi (FRA)	3	2

Round of 16
Hugues Bella-Lufu (RSA)	0
Mohamed Abdelfatah (EGY)	5^{F}
Aleksey Mishin (RUS)	4	4
Mélonin Noumonvi (FRA)	0	1

Quarterfinals
Mohamed Abdelfatah (EGY)	2	5
Aleksey Mishin (RUS)	0	0

==== Section 2 ====
Round of 64

Round of 32
Laimutis Adomaitis (LTU)	6^{F}
Keitani Graham (FSM)	0
Shingo Matsumoto (JPN)	1	1	6
Bernhard Mayr (GER)	1	1	0
Badri Khasaia (GEO)	2	3
Cristian Mosquera (COL)	0	0
Ntante Charempasvili (GRE)	3	2
Tarvi Thomberg (EST)	0	1

Round of 16
Laimutis Adomaitis (LTU)	1	3
Shingo Matsumoto (JPN)	3	3
Badri Khasaia (GEO)	4	2
Ntante Charempasvili (GRE)	0	0

Quarterfinals
Shingo Matsumoto (JPN)	0	4	2
Badri Khasaia (GEO)	2	1	2

=== Bottom half ===
==== Section 3 ====
Round of 64

Round of 32
Saman Tahmasebi (IRI)	5	3
José Antonio Arias (DOM)	0	1
Pavel Burlă (ROM)	0	0
Kim Jung-sub (KOR)	3	4
Jake Clark (USA)	0	3	1
Nazmi Avluca (TUR)	6	0	2
Fred de Vos (NED)	0	1
Sándor Bárdosi (HUN)	6	3

Round of 16
Saman Tahmasebi (IRI)	3	2
Kim Jung-sub (KOR)	0	2
Nazmi Avluca (TUR)	2	3
Sándor Bárdosi (HUN)	0	0

Quarterfinals
Saman Tahmasebi (IRI)	1
Nazmi Avluca (TUR)	3^{F}

==== Section 4 ====
Round of 64
Artur Michalkiewicz (POL)	2	1
Viachaslau Makaranka (BLR)	1	1
Vitaliy Zakharchenko (KAZ)	0	4	0
Aleksandr Dokturishvili (UZB)	3	0	4^{F}
Andrea Minguzzi (ITA)	2	4
Pedro García (ESP)	1	1
Jure Kuhar (SLO)	0	0
Ara Abrahamian (SWE)	6	6

Round of 32
Nenad Žugaj (CRO)	0	4	1
Wang Gang (CHN)	4	1	4
Kim-Jussi Nurmela (FIN)	2^{F}
Fritz Aanes (NOR)	4
Artur Michalkiewicz (POL)	1	1
Aleksandr Dokturishvili (UZB)	1	1
Andrea Minguzzi (ITA)	0	1
Ara Abrahamian (SWE)	6	4

Round of 16
Wang Gang (CHN)	2	3	3
Kim-Jussi Nurmela (FIN)	4	1	7
Artur Michalkiewicz (POL)	4	0	1
Ara Abrahamian (SWE)	0	3	1

Quarterfinals
Kim-Jussi Nurmela (FIN)	4	6
Artur Michalkiewicz (POL)	3	0

=== Repechage ===
Repechage round 2
Attila Bátky (SVK)	4	7
Hugues Bella-Lufu (RSA)	0	0
Jake Clark (USA)	4	0	2
Sándor Bárdosi (HUN)	1	2	2

Repechage round 3
Attila Bátky (SVK)	1	0
Aleksey Mishin (RUS)	2	5
Jake Clark (USA)	2	1
Saman Tahmasebi (IRI)	5	3

Bronze medals
Aleksey Mishin (RUS)	0	1	4
Badri Khasaia (GEO)	3	1	1
Saman Tahmasebi (IRI)	3	5
Kim-Jussi Nurmela (FIN)	3	0
