= Kim Jin-soo (wrestler) =

South Korean wrestler (born 1974)

Personal information
- Full name: Kim Jin-soo
- Nationality: South Korea
- Born: 15 May 1974 (age 52) Seoul, South Korea
- Height: 1.76 m (5 ft 9 1/2 in)
- Weight: 76 kg (168 lb)

Sport
- Style: Greco-Roman
- Club: Korean Housing Company Sports Club
- Coach: Kim Chang-duk
Medal record
Men's Greco-Roman wrestling
Representing South Korea
World Championships
Bronze medal – third place	2001 Patras	76 kg
Bronze medal – third place	2003 Créteil	74 kg
Asian Games
Gold medal – first place	2002 Busan	74 kg
Asian Championships
Gold medal – first place	1996 Xiaoshan	74 kg
Gold medal – first place	1999 Tashkent	74 kg

Kim Jin-soo (Korean: 김진수; born May 15, 1974) is a South Korean former amateur Greco-Roman wrestler, who competed in the men's middleweight category. Kim wrestled for the South Korean squad in two editions of the Summer Olympics (1996 and 2000) and came closest to the medal haul in 2000 (finishing fifth overall in the men's 76-kg division). Outside the Olympic career, Kim collected a total of five medals in a major international tournament, including a gold at the 2002 Asian Games in Busan. Worked as a full-time employee for Korean Housing Company, Kim trained throughout his wrestling career for the company's sports club, under his personal coach Kim Chang-duk.

Kim made his Olympic debut in Atlanta 1996, competing in the men's welterweight category (74 kg). There, he opened his match by easily throwing Sweden's Torbjörn Kornbakk off the mat with a superb 11–0 verdict, but could not overthrow the defending champion Mnatsakan Iskandaryan of Russia in the next round, dropping him out of the winners' circle by a formidable 0–4 decision. Entering the repechage stage, Kim avenged his defeat from Iskandaryan to tame the U.S. wrestler Gordy Morgan with a close 3–2 verdict, before he lost his subsequent bout to Bulgarian opponent Stoyan Stoyanov (5–0) that left him injured and frail at the very end.

At the 2000 Summer Olympics in Sydney, Kim qualified for his second South Korean team in the men's middleweight division (76 kg). Seven months earlier, he beat Uzbekistan's Evgeny Erofalyov for the top spot at the final match of the second Olympic Qualification Tournament in Tashkent. Kim dominated the three-man prelim pool by subduing Azerbaijan's Khvicha Bichinashvili (3–2) and Turkey's Nazmi Avluca (3–1) to secure a spot for the next round. He fell to his Finnish opponent and eventual bronze medalist Marko Yli-Hannuksela with a score 0–3 in the quarterfinals, but bounced back to forge a powerful 9–0 victory over Sweden's Ara Abrahamian for fifth place in a consolation match, a vast improvement from his previous Olympic feat.

When his nation hosted the 2002 Asian Games in Busan, Kim capped off his sporting career with a golden triumph over Kazakhstan's Danil Khalimov by the delight of a massive home crowd in the men's 74 kg division, having been the last to score in a 3–3 draw.
