= Félix Isisola =

Peruvian wrestler

Personal information
- Nationality: Peruvian
- Born: 5 May 1964 (age 62)

Sport
- Sport: Wrestling

Félix Isisola (born 5 May 1964) is a Peruvian wrestler. He competed in the men's Greco-Roman 82 kg at the 1996 Summer Olympics.
