= Sergey Tsvir =

Russian wrestler (born 1974)

Personal information
- Nationality: Russian
- Born: 8 February 1974 (age 52)

Sport
- Sport: Wrestling

Sergey Tsvir (born 8 February 1974) is a Russian wrestler. He competed in the men's Greco-Roman 82 kg at the 1996 Summer Olympics.
