= Anton Marchl =

Austrian wrestler

Personal information
- Nationality: Austrian
- Born: 19 March 1965 (age 61) Wals-Siezenheim, Austria

Sport
- Sport: Wrestling

Anton Marchl (born 19 March 1965) is an Austrian wrestler. He competed in the men's Greco-Roman 74 kg at the 1992 Summer Olympics.
