= Néstor Almanza =

Cuban Greco-Roman wrestler

Personal information
- Full name: Néstor Almanza Baro
- Born: 29 March 1971 (age 55)
- Height: 180 cm (5 ft 11 in)
Medal record
Men's Greco-Roman wrestling
Representing Cuba
World Championships
Gold medal – first place	1993 Stockholm	-74 kg
Pan American Championships
Gold medal – first place	1992 Albany	-74 kg
Silver medal – second place	2000 Cali	-76 kg
Central American and Caribbean Games
Gold medal – first place	1993 Ponce	-74 kg

Néstor Almanza Baro (Note: In this Spanish name, the first or paternal surname is Almanza and the second or maternal family name is Baro.) (born 29 March 1971) is a Cuban wrestler. He competed in the men's Greco-Roman 74 kg at the 1992 Summer Olympics.
