= Kader Slila =

Algerian wrestler

Personal information
- Nationality: Algerian
- Born: 19 January 1979 (age 47)

Sport
- Sport: Wrestling

Kader Slila (born 19 January 1979) is an Algerian wrestler. He competed in the men's Greco-Roman 76 kg at the 2000 Summer Olympics.
