= Tuomo Karila =

Finnish wrestler (born 1968)

Personal information
- Full name: Tuomo Arto Mikael Karila
- Nickname: Tuoppi
- Nationality: Finland
- Born: 7 April 1968 (age 58) Helsinki, Uusimaa, Finland

Sport
- Style: Greco-Roman
Medal record
World Championships
Silver medal – second place	1994 Istanbul	82 kg
European Championships
Silver medal – second place	Poznań 1990	74 kg
Silver medal – second place	Aschaffenburg 1991	74 kg

Tuomo Arto Mikael Karila (born 7 April 1968) is a Finnish former Olympic wrestler. He was born in Helsinki, Uusimaa, Finland. His nickname is Tuoppi.

== Wrestling career ==
His sports club was Vantaan Sampo, in Vantaa, in Finland.

In 1986, he won the Minnesota high school Class A 155-pound wrestling title as an 18-year-old exchange student at Canby High School, after a 29-3-1 season wrestling in three different weight classes.

He won silver medals at the 1990 and 1991 European Championships at 74.0 kg in Greco-Roman wrestling.

Karila competed for Finland at the 1992 Summer Olympics in Barcelona, at the age of 24, in Wrestling--Men's Welterweight (74 kg), Greco-Roman.

He won a silver medal at the 1994 World Wrestling Championships at 82.0 kg in Greco-Roman wrestling.

Karila competed for Finland at the 1996 Summer Olympics in Atlanta at the age of 28, in Wrestling--Men's Middleweight (82 kg), Greco-Roman, and came in 11th.
