= Travis West =

American wrestler

Personal information
- Born: January 13, 1967 Phoenix, Arizona, U.S.
- Died: June 14, 2004 (aged 37) Portland, Oregon, U.S.

Sport
- Country: United States
- Sport: Wrestling
- Events: Greco-Roman and Folkstlye
- College team: Portland State
- Club: Sunkist Kids Wrestling Club
- Team: USA
Medal record
Collegiate Wrestling
Representing Portland State
NCAA Division II Championships
| Gold medal – first place | 1989 California | 142 lb |
| Silver medal – second place | 1990 Kenosha | 150 lb |

Travis West (January 13, 1967 – June 14, 2004) was an American wrestler. He competed in the men's Greco-Roman 74 kg at the 1992 Summer Olympics.
