= Artur Dzyhasov =

Ukrainian wrestler

Personal information
- Nationality: Ukrainian
- Born: 4 March 1962 (age 64) Ardon, Ukrainian SSR, Soviet Union

Sport
- Sport: Wrestling

Artur Dzyhasov (born 4 March 1962) is a Ukrainian wrestler. He competed in the men's Greco-Roman 74 kg at the 1996 Summer Olympics.
