= Faafetai Iutana =

Samoan wrestler

Personal information
- Nationality: Samoan
- Born: 24 May 1977 (age 49)

Sport
- Sport: Wrestling

Faafetai Iutana (born 24 May 1977) is a Samoan former wrestler. He competed in the men's Greco-Roman 76 kg at the 2000 Summer Olympics.
