= Aziz Khalfi =

Moroccan wrestler

Personal information
- Nationality: Moroccan
- Born: 13 May 1973 (age 53)

Sport
- Sport: Wrestling

Aziz Khalfi (born 13 May 1973) is a Moroccan wrestler. He competed in the men's Greco-Roman 74 kg at the 1996 Summer Olympics.
