= Željko Trajković =

Serbian wrestler

Medal record

Representing Yugoslavia

Men's Wrestling

World Championships
Bronze medal – third place	1990 Ostia	Welterweight

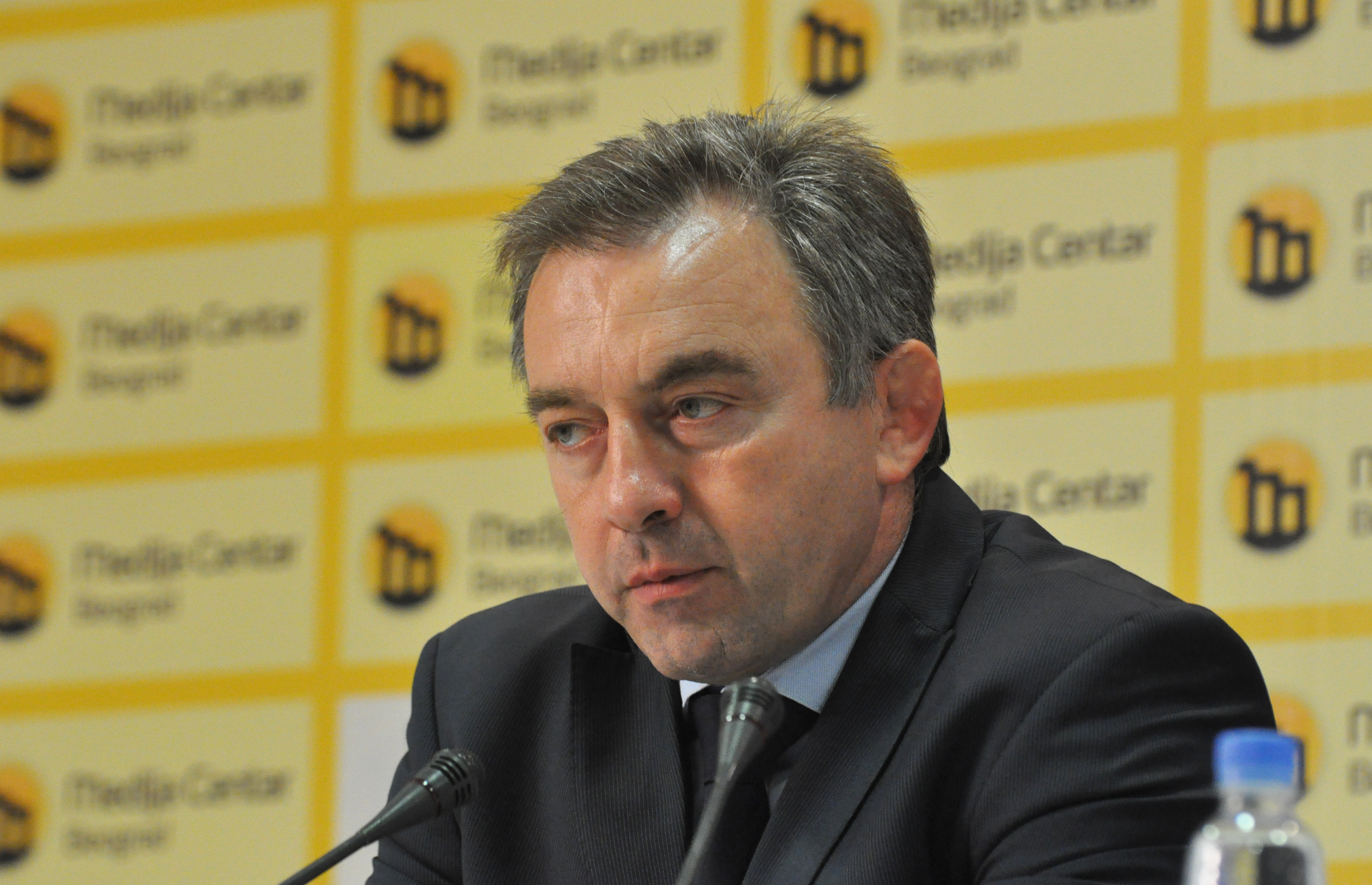

Željko Trajković (born October 8, 1966) is a retired Serbian wrestler who competed in the 1992 Summer Olympics as an Independent Olympic participant.
