= Elias Marcano =

Venezuelan wrestler

Personal information
- Nationality: Venezuelan
- Born: 1 March 1971 (age 55)

Sport
- Sport: Wrestling

Elias Marcano (born 1 March 1971) is a Venezuelan wrestler. He competed in the men's Greco-Roman 82 kg at the 1996 Summer Olympics.
