= Dobri Ivanov =

Bulgarian wrestler

Personal information
- Full name: Dobri Marinov Ivanov
- Nationality: Bulgarian
- Born: 22 November 1964 (age 61)

Sport
- Sport: Wrestling

Dobri Marinov Ivanov (born 22 November 1964) is a Bulgarian wrestler. He competed in the men's Greco-Roman 74 kg at the 1992 Summer Olympics.
