= Erhan Balcı =

Turkish wrestler

Personal information
- Nationality: Turkish
- Born: 15 January 1966 (age 59)

Sport
- Sport: Wrestling

Erhan Balcı (born 15 January 1966) is a Turkish wrestler. He competed at the 1988 Summer Olympics and the 1992 Summer Olympics.
