= Evgeniy Erofaylov =

Uzbekistani wrestler (born 1975)

Personal information
- Nationality: Uzbekistani
- Born: 29 August 1975 (age 50)

Sport
- Sport: Wrestling
Medal record
Representing Uzbekistan
Asian Championships
Silver medal – second place	2003 New Delhi	84 kg
Bronze medal – third place	2001 Ulaanbaatar	85 kg

Evgeniy Anatolyevich Erofaylov (Russian: Евгений Анатольевич Ерофайлов; born 29 August 1975) is an Uzbekistani wrestler. He competed in the men's Greco-Roman 76 kg at the 2000 Summer Olympics.
