= Wei Qingkun =

Chinese wrestler

Personal information
- Nationality: Chinese
- Born: 7 October 1966 (age 58)

Sport
- Sport: Wrestling

Wei Qingkun (born 7 October 1966) is a Chinese wrestler. He competed at the 1988 Summer Olympics and the 1992 Summer Olympics.
