= Khvicha Bichinashvili =

Azerbaijani wrestler (born 1974)

Personal information
- Nationality: Azerbaijani
- Born: 28 January 1974 (age 52)

Sport
- Sport: Wrestling

Khvicha Bichinashvili (born 28 January 1974) is an Azerbaijani wrestler. He competed in the men's Greco-Roman 76 kg at the 2000 Summer Olympics.
