= Tarieli Melelashvili =

Georgian wrestler

Personal information
- Nationality: Georgian
- Born: 28 March 1976 (age 50) Martkopi, Georgia

Sport
- Sport: Wrestling

Tarieli Melelashvili (born 28 March 1976) is a Georgian wrestler. He competed at the 1996 Summer Olympics and the 2000 Summer Olympics. Two-way world champion(U23).European champion(Seniors). Mostly known as The uncrowned champion.
