= Jaroslav Zeman =

Czech wrestler

Personal information
- Nationality: Czech
- Born: 10 February 1962 (age 63); Prague, Czechoslovakia

Sport
- Sport: Wrestling

Jaroslav Zeman (born 10 February 1962) is a Czech wrestler. He competed at the 1988 Summer Olympics, the 1992 Summer Olympics and the 1996 Summer Olympics.
