= Bakhtiyar Baiseitov (wrestler) =

Kazakhstani sport wrestler

Personal information
- Full name: Bakhtiyar Bagasharovich Baiseitov
- Nationality: Kazakhstan
- Born: 29 September 1971 (age 54) Almaty, Kazakh SSR, Soviet Union
- Height: 1.76 m (5 ft 9 1/2 in)
- Weight: 76 kg (168 lb)

Sport
- Style: Greco-Roman
- Club: Professional Sport Club Daulet
- Coach: Daulet Turlykhanov
Medal record
Men's Greco-Roman wrestling
Representing Kazakhstan
World Championships
Gold medal – first place	1998 Gävle	76 kg
Silver medal – second place	1995 Prague	74 kg
Asian Games
Gold medal – first place	1998 Bangkok	76 kg
Asian Championships
Gold medal – first place	2000 Seoul	74 kg
Silver medal – second place	2005 Wuhan	74 kg
Bronze medal – third place	1996 Xiaoshan	74 kg

Bakhtiyar Bagasharovich Baiseitov (Kazakh: Бахтияр Багашарович Байсеитов, Bahitiiar Bagaşarovich Baiseitov; born September 29, 1971) is a Kazakh former amateur Greco-Roman wrestler, who competed in the men's middleweight category. Baiseitov wrestled for the Kazakh squad in two editions of the Summer Olympics (1996 and 2000), finishing eleventh in Atlanta and tenth in Sydney, respectively. Outside the Games, Baiseitov produced a career tally of six medals in a major international competition, including his middleweight titles that he received each at the World Championships and at the Asian Games in 1998. Baiseitov trained throughout his wrestling career for Professional Sport Club Daulet in Almaty under his personal coach and 1988 silver medalist Daulet Turlykhanov of the former Soviet Union.

Baiseitov made his Olympic debut in Atlanta 1996, competing in the men's welterweight category (74 kg). Despite losing his first match to Cuban wrestler and eventual champion Filiberto Azcuy (9–0), Baiseitov bounced back from his early defeat to pin Mexico's Rodolfo Hernández; however, he could not hold Poland's Józef Tracz tightly on the mat with a 1–2 shutout and lost the match in his next bout, dropping him to eleventh overall.

Baiseitov reached the pinnacle of his wrestling career, when he scored an enormous upset over the reigning Olympic titleholder Azcuy to win a gold medal at the 1998 World Championships in Gävle, Sweden. Baiseitov's success continued by edging past Japan's Takamitsu Katayama (5–4) to claim the middleweight title at the Asian Games three months later in Bangkok.

At the 2000 Summer Olympics in Sydney, Baiseitov qualified for his second Kazakh team in the men's middleweight division (76 kg). Six months earlier, he defeated Egypt's Ahmed Fahme to round off the podium with a bronze and secure a berth at the third Olympic Qualification Tournament in Alexandria. He lost his opening match 1–4 to Finland's three-time Olympian and eventual bronze medalist Marko Yli-Hannuksela, but bounced back to oust his French rival and 1995 world champion Yvon Riemer with a convincing 4–2 victory. Placing second in the prelim pool and tenth overall, Baiseitov failed to advance to the quarterfinals.
