= David Manukyan =

Ukrainian wrestler (born 1969)

Medal record

Men's Greco-Roman wrestling

Representing Ukraine

European Championships
Silver medal – second place	2000 Moscow	76 kg

David Manukyan (Armenian: Դավիթ Մանուկյան, Ukrainian: Давид Манукян, born November 19, 1969, in Leninakan, Armenian SSR, Soviet Union) is a Ukrainian Greco Roman wrestler of Armenian descent. He came in fourth place at the 2000 Summer Olympics.
