= Erik Hahn =

German wrestler

Personal information
- Nationality: German
- Born: 25 September 1970 (age 55) Potsdam, East Germany

Sport
- Sport: Wrestling

Erik Hahn (born 25 September 1970) is a German wrestler. He competed in the men's Greco-Roman 74 kg at the 1996 Summer Olympics.
