= Mnatsakan Iskandaryan =

Armenian Greco-Roman wrestler

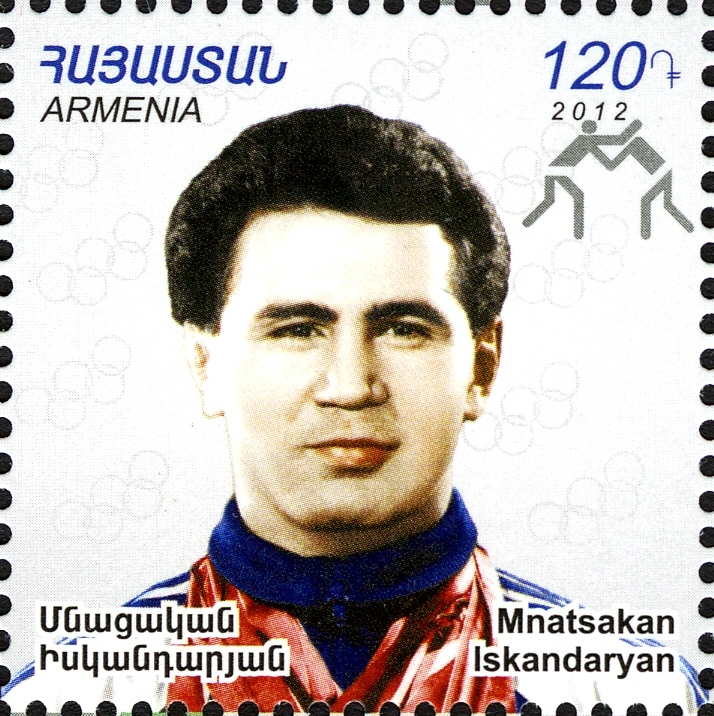

Personal information
- Born: 17 May 1967 (age 59) Gyumri, Armenian SSR, Soviet Union
- Height: 1.69 m (5 ft 6 1/2 in)
- Weight: 75 kg (165 lb)

Sport
- Sport: Wrestling
- Event: Greco-Roman
- Club: KSV Witten 07
- Coached by: Koryun Movsesian
Medal record
Men's Greco-Roman wrestling
Representing Unified Team
Olympic Games
Gold medal – first place	1992 Barcelona	74 kg
Representing Soviet Union
World Championships
Gold medal – first place	1990 Ostia	74 kg
Gold medal – first place	1991 Varna	74 kg
European Championships
Silver medal – second place	1989 Oulu	68 kg
Gold medal – first place	1991 Aschaffenburg	74 kg
Gold medal – first place	1992 Copenhagen	74 kg
World Cup
Gold medal – first place	1988 Athens	68 kg
Representing Russia
World Championships
Gold medal – first place	1994 Tampere	74 kg

Mnatsakan Iskandaryan (Armenian: Մնացական Իսկանդարյան, Russian: Мнацакан Фрунзевич Искандарян; born 17 May 1967) is a former Armenian Greco-Roman wrestler who competed for the Soviet Union and Russia. Iskandaryan is an Olympic Champion, three-time World Champion, and two-time European Champion. He earned the rank Honoured Master of Sports of the USSR in 1991 and was named Honoured Coach of Russia in 2000. In 2012, Iskandaryan was inducted into the FILA Hall of Fame as the sole Greco-Roman inductee. He's the second Armenian to be inducted into the Hall of Fame, after Armen Nazaryan.

== Biography ==
Mnatsakan Iskandaryan started Greco-Roman wrestling in 1978 under the guidance of Koryun Movsesian. In 1987, he became an Espoir World Champion. Iskandaryan became a member of the USSR national Greco-Roman wrestling team in 1988. In that same year, he won a gold medal at the Wrestling World Cup team competition. Iskandaryan remained a member of the Soviet national team until the Union's fall in 1991. He won a silver medal in the 1989 European Wrestling Championships. In 1990, he moved to a heavier weight class, from lightweight (68 kg) to welterweight (74 kg), and won a 1990 World Wrestling Championships gold medal. In 1991, Iskandaryan became a European Champion and two-time consecutive World Champion. He repeated the European success by winning a 1992 European Championships gold medal for a consecutive second time. Ranked as the number one wrestler in his division for the past few years, Iskandaryan entered the 1992 Summer Olympics as the gold medal favorite.

Although Iskandaryan's home of Armenia was now independent, all of the former Soviet Olympians still competed together at the 1992 Olympic Games in Barcelona, under the Unified Team. Iskandaryan had single-handedly defeated all of his opposition, and thus claimed the Olympic gold medal and became an Olympic Champion.

Iskandaryan underwent over two years of inactivity following his Olympic victory. He finally returned, now serving under the Russian flag, at the 1994 World Wrestling Championships, where he claimed his third World Championship gold medal. Iskandaryan competed at the 1996 Summer Olympics in Atlanta. He was unable to win a medal and came in fifth place. Iskandaryan retired from wrestling after the 1996 Olympics and started coaching. As of 1996, he is the head coach of the national Greco-Roman wrestling youth team of Russia. In 2012, Iskandaryan was inducted into the FILA Hall of Fame, the sole Greco-Roman inductee. He became the second Armenian to be inducted into the Hall of Fame, after Armen Nazaryan in 2007.
