= Torbjörn Kornbakk =

Swedish wrestler (born 1965)

Personal information
- Full name: Torbjörn Jarle Kornbakk
- Born: 28 May 1965 (age 61) Gothenburg, Sweden
- Height: 179 cm (5 ft 10 in)
- Weight: 78 kg (172 lb)
Medal record
Men's Greco-Roman wrestling
Representing Sweden
Olympic Games
Bronze medal – third place	1992 Barcelona	74 kg
World Championships
Bronze medal – third place	1994 Tampere	74 kg
European Championships
Gold medal – first place	1990 Poznan	74 kg
Gold medal – first place	1997 Kouvola	74 kg
Silver medal – second place	1989 Oulu	74 kg
Bronze medal – third place	1991 Aschaffenburg	74 kg
Bronze medal – third place	1994 Athens	74 kg

Torbjörn Jarle Kornbakk (born 28 May 1965) is a Swedish former wrestler. He won a bronze medal in the welterweight (74 kg) event at the 1992 Summer Olympics. At the 1996 Summer Olympics he came in 10th in the same event. He was a two time European Wrestling Championships gold medalist (1990 and 1997), and at the 1994 World Wrestling Championships won a bronze medal.
