= Youssef Bouguerra =

Algerian wrestler (born 1969)

Personal information
- Nationality: Algerian
- Born: 28 October 1969 (age 56)

Sport
- Sport: Wrestling

Youssef Bouguerra (born 28 October 1969) is an Algerian wrestler. He competed at the 1992 Summer Olympics and the 1996 Summer Olympics.
