= Józef Tracz =

Polish Greco-Roman wrestler

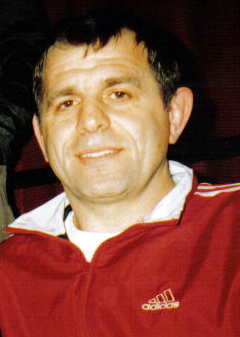
- Józef Tracz

Medal record
Event	1st	2nd	3rd
Olympic Games	0	1	2
World Championships	0	3	0
Total	0	4	2

Men's Greco-Roman wrestling

Representing Poland

Olympic Games
Silver medal – second place	1992 Barcelona	74 kg
Bronze medal – third place	1988 Seoul	74 kg
Bronze medal – third place	1996 Atlanta	74 kg

World Championships
Silver medal – second place	1987 Clermont-Ferrand	74 kg
Silver medal – second place	1993 Stockholm	74 kg
Silver medal – second place	1994 Tampere	74 kg

Józef Bronisław Tracz (born 1 September 1964 in Żary) is a Polish wrestler (Greco-Roman style) who has won three Olympic medals.

For his sport achievements, he received:
Knight's Cross of the Order of Polonia Restituta (5th Class) in 1996.
