= Rodolfo Hernández (wrestler) =

Mexican wrestler (born 1969)

Personal information
- Born: 2 November 1969 (age 56) Mexico City, Mexico

Sport
- Sport: Wrestling
Medal record
Representing Mexico
Pan American Games
Bronze medal – third place	1999 Winnipeg	-76kg Greco-Roman
Central American and Caribbean Games
Silver medal – second place	1990 Mexico City	-74kg Greco-Roman
Bronze medal – third place	1993 Ponce	-74kg Greco-Roman
Bronze medal – third place	1998 Maracaibo	-76kg Greco-Roman

Rodolfo Hernández Vázquez (born 2 November 1969) is a Mexican former wrestler. He competed in the men's Greco-Roman 74 kg at the 1996 Summer Olympics.
