= Yury Vitt =

Uzbekistani wrestler

Personal information
- Nationality: Uzbekistani
- Born: 4 March 1980 (age 46)

Sport
- Sport: Wrestling

Yury Vitt (born 4 March 1980) is an Uzbekistani wrestler. He competed in the men's Greco-Roman 85 kg at the 2000 Summer Olympics.
