= Tamás Berzicza =

Hungarian Greco-Roman wrestler

Personal information
- Full name: Tamás Berzicza
- Nationality: Hungary
- Born: 15 August 1975 (age 50) Zalaegerszeg, Hungary
- Height: 1.76 m (5 ft 9 1/2 in)
- Weight: 82 kg (181 lb)

Sport
- Style: Greco-Roman
- Club: Kecskeméti TE
- Coach: Ferenc Berzicza
Medal record
Men's Greco-Roman wrestling
Representing Hungary
World Championships
Silver medal – second place	1997 Wrocław	76 kg
European Championships
Silver medal – second place	1999 Sofia	76 kg

Tamás Berzicza (born 15 August 1975 in Zalaegerszeg) is a retired amateur Hungarian Greco-Roman wrestler, who competed in the men's middleweight category. Considered one of the world's top Greco-Roman wrestlers in his decade, Berzicza had claimed two silver medals each at the World and European Championships, and later represented his nation Hungary in three editions of the Olympic Games (1996, 2000, and 2004). Throughout his sporting career, Berzicza trained as part of the wrestling team for Kecskemét Gymnastics Club (Hungarian: Kecskeméti Testedző Egyesület), under his father and personal coach Ferenc Berzicza.

Berzicza made his official debut at the 1996 Summer Olympics in Atlanta, where he competed in the men's welterweight class (74 kg). Being successful early in the opening rounds, he entered the quarterfinals powerful and undefeated, but fell to Germany's Erik Hahn with a score 1–3. Berzicza offered a free pass to finish in seventh at the end of tournament when Bulgaria's Stoyan Stoyanov decided to forfeit the consolation match. The following year, Berzicza emerged into the spotlight with his first career medal in the same category at the 1997 World Wrestling Championships in Wrocław, Poland, losing his final match to Finland's Marko Yli-Hannuksela.

Determined to return to the Olympic scene and medal, Berzicza entered the 2000 Summer Olympics in Sydney as a top medal contender in the men's middleweight division (76 kg). He managed to beat Japan's Takamitsu Katayama in his opening bout, but could not pin Russian wrestler Murat Kardanov in the prelim pool. Finishing second in the elimination round and fourteenth overall, Berzicza's performance was not enough to advance him further into the semifinals as he left the Games in bewilderment.

At the 2004 Summer Olympics in Athens, Berzicza qualified for his third team, as a 28-year-old, in the men's 74 kg class by placing first and receiving a berth from the Olympic Qualification Tournament in Novi Sad, Serbia and Montenegro. He lost his opening match against Uzbek wrestler Aleksandr Dokturishvili with a score 2–4, but managed to eclipse the host nation's Alexios Kolitsopoulos and Azerbaijan's Vugar Aslanov, who did not appear on his final match because of sustained injuries, in the prelim pool. Berzicza fell short to advance further into the quarterfinals, after finishing the pool in second place and eighth overall.
