= Yvon Riemer =

French Greco-Roman wrestler

Personal information
- Born: 5 October 1970 (age 55) Strasbourg, France
- Height: 1.73 m (5 ft 8 in)
- Weight: 76 kg (168 lb)

Sport
- Sport: Greco-Roman wrestling
- Club: Olympia Lutte Schiltigheim
- Coached by: Jean Pierre Riemer
Medal record
Men's Greco-Roman wrestling
Representing France
World Championships
Gold medal – first place	1995 Prague	74 kg
Silver medal – second place	1999 Athens	76 kg
Bronze medal – third place	1991 Varna	74 kg
Bronze medal – third place	1993 Stockholm	74 kg
European Championships
Silver medal – second place	1992 Copenhagen	74 kg
Bronze medal – third place	1997 Kouvola	76 kg
Mediterranean Games
Gold medal – first place	1991 Athens	74 kg
Gold medal – first place	1997 Bari	76 kg
World Espoir Championships
Gold medal – first place	1989 Budapest	74 kg

Yvon Riemer (born 5 October 1970) is a retired Greco-Roman wrestler from France. He medalled four times at the World Championships, winning gold in 1995, and competed at the 1992 and 2000 Olympics as a welterweight (-74 and -76 kg), finishing in 5th and 15th place, respectively. He was also a three time French national champion (1990, 1994, 2001).

== Career ==
Born in Strasbourg to a family of wrestlers, he began training as a wrestler under his father, Jean-Pierre, in 1980. From 1985 to 1990, he won 11 national and three European youth championships in both disciplines (Greco-Roman and freestyle. At the 1989 World Espoir (under-20) Championships in Budapest, Riemer won his first international gold in the Greco-Roman -74 kg category.

He made his senior international debut at the 1991 Mediterranean Games in Athens, where he won gold as a welterweight. That same year, he won bronze at the World Championships in Varna. The winner of the tournament, Mnatsakan Iskandaryan, would later become his greatest rival in many international competitions. He was chosen to represent his country at the 1992 Olympics in Barcelona, where the 21-year-old surprisingly placed 5th in the -74 kg category. He was eliminated by Iskandaryan. He won silver at the 1992 European Championships, also losing to Iskandaryan in the final. A bronze at the 1993 World Championships was his highest point of success for a while. A combination of injury and a lack of training led to him finishing 12th and 16th at the European and World championships, respectively, in 1994.

In 1995, after missing the European Championships because of injury, he finally became world champion by defeating Kazakh wrestler Bakhtiar Baiseitov by points in the -74 kg finals in Prague. He also defeated Iskandaryan for the first time. 1996, however, marked a return of injuries. He finished 7th at the European championships, and was not able to compete at the Worlds or the Olympics. He made yet another triumphant return in 1997, scoring another gold in the 1997 Mediterranean Games and finishing third in Europe. He barely missed the podium at the World Championships, losing to Cuban Filiberto Azcuy by points in a fight for bronze.

His last major success was a silver medal at the 1999 World Championships in Athens, where he lost 11:0 in 2 minutes and 41 seconds to Nazmi Avluca in the finals. The deciding factor was when Avluca threw Riemer over his shoulder 13 seconds into the match, earning 8 points, and taking advantage of Riemer's history of shoulder injuries. He failed to medal at the 1998 or 2001 Worlds, finishing 27th and 23rd, respectively. He also made one last effort at the 2000 Olympics in Sydney, losing both of his matches and finishing 15th.

He retired in 2001 and became a coach for the French national wrestling team.

== Personal life ==
Riemer is married to Sophie Pluquet, who also won a gold medal at the 1995 World Wrestling Championships in women's freestyle (-53 kg). They have one son.
