= Artur Michalkiewicz =

Polish Greco-Roman wrestler (born 1977)

Artur Paweł Michalkiewicz (born 11 September 1977 in Wrocław) is a Polish Greco-Roman wrestler who competed in the 2008 Summer Olympics in Beijing and in the 2000 Summer Olympics.

At the 2008 Summer Olympics he finished 16th in the middleweight competition (84 kg) in wrestling.
