= Dimitrios Avramis =

Greek Greco-Roman wrestler

Personal information
- Full name: Dimitrios Avramis
- Nationality: Greece
- Born: 1 January 1975 (age 51) Trikala, Greece
- Height: 1.78 m (5 ft 10 in)
- Weight: 84 kg (185 lb)

Sport
- Style: Greco-Roman
- Club: Panellinios G.S.
- Coach: Spyridon Avramis
Medal record
Men's Greco-Roman wrestling
Representing Greece
Mediterranean Games
Silver medal – second place	1997 Bari	76 kg
World Championships
Bronze medal – third place	1999 Athens	76 kg
European Championships
Silver medal – second place	2004 Haparanda	84 kg
Bronze medal – third place	1999 Sofia	76 kg
Silver medal – second place	1993 Götzis (junior)	76 kg

Dimitrios Avramis (Greek: Δημήτριος Αβράμης; born January 1, 1975, in Trikala) is a retired amateur Greek Greco-Roman wrestler, who competed in the men's light heavyweight category. Dimitrios Avramis has claimed a silver medal in the 76-kg division at the 1997 Mediterranean Games in Bari, Italy, picked up a bronze at the 1999 World Wrestling Championships in Athens, and later represented his nation Greece in two editions of the Olympic Games (2000 and 2004).

Throughout his sporting career, Avramis trained as a member of the Greco-Roman wrestling team for Panellinios G.S. in Athens, under his brother and personal coach Spyridon Avramis. He managed to be Greco-Roman Wrestling Champion in Greece for 15 years in row in every age category, from 1990 to 2004: Junior (1990, 1991), Teen (1992, 1993), Young (1994, 1995), Men (1995, 1996, 1997, 1998, 1999, 2000, 2001, 2002, 2003, 2004). His achievement becomes more remarkable, as he didn't lose any fight in Greece from 1990 to 2004.

He won his first international medal when he was just 18 years old, at the 1993 European Wrestling Championships in Götzis, Austria, where he picked up the silver medal in the 76-kg division.

Avramis emerged himself into the international scene at the 1999 World Wrestling Championships in Athens, where he picked up the bronze medal in the 76-kg division over Georgia's Tarieli Melelashvili that earned him a spot on the Greek Olympic team.

The following year, Avramis made his official debut at the 2000 Summer Olympics in Sydney, where he competed in the men's middleweight division (76 kg). In the prelim pool, he pulled Armenia's Levon Geghamyan off the mat in overtime on his opening bout, but suffered a mighty throw from Sweden's Ara Abrahamian by a 2–3 sudden death decision. Finishing the pool in second place and twelfth overall, Avramis' performance was not enough to put him through into the quarterfinals.

When Greece welcomed the 2004 Summer Olympics in Athens, Avramis qualified as a member of the Greek squad in the men's 84 kg class, by obtaining an automatic bid for the host nation and placing second from the European Championships in Haparanda, Sweden. Entering the Games as a top favorite, Avramis delighted the home crowd inside the Ano Liossa Olympic Hall, as he prevailed two straight matches over Iran's Behrouz Jamshidi and Norway's Fritz Aanes in the round-robin pool to take a coveted spot for the next round. As he faced off against Russia's Alexei Mishin in the quarterfinals, Avramis could not hold his tough opponent into the ring and lost the match 2–5. With his next opponent Mohamed Abdelfatah of Egypt being disqualified for protesting, Avramis was immediately awarded a spot in the fifth-place match by forfeit.
