= Filiberto Azcuy =

Cuban wrestler (born 1972)

Personal information
- Born: October 13, 1972 (age 53) Esmeralda, Camagüey, Cuba
Medal record
Men's Greco-Roman wrestling
Representing Cuba
Olympic Games
Gold medal – first place	1996 Atlanta	74 kg
Gold medal – first place	2000 Sydney	69 kg
Pan American Games
Gold medal – first place	1995 Mar del Plata	74 kg

Filiberto Azcuy Aguilera (born October 13, 1972) is a Cuban wrestler (Greco-Roman style) who has won two Olympic gold medals.
