= Murat Kardanov =

Russian Greco-Roman wrestler

Medal record

Men's Greco-Roman wrestling

Representing Russia

Olympic Games
Gold medal – first place	2000 Sydney	76 kg

World Championships
Bronze medal – third place	1993 Stockholm	82 kg

World Cups
Gold medal – first place	1992 Besancon	82 kg
Gold medal – first place	1995 Schifferstadt	82 kg

European Championships
Bronze medal – third place	1993 Istanbul	82 kg
Gold medal – first place	1998 Minsk	76 kg
Bronze medal – third place	2000 Moscow	76 kg

Murat Nausbievich Kardanov (Russian: Мурат Наусбиевич Карданов; Adyghe: Къардэн Мурат, Нэусби и къуэ) (born January 4, 1971, in Zaragij village, Kabardino-Balkaria) is a Russian wrestler and Olympic champion in Greco-Roman wrestling.

During his career Kardanov won gold medals in Russian Championships 4 times (1992, 1993, 1998, 2000), in European Championships (1998) and Olympic Games (2000). He also took bronze medal in World Championships (1993).

== Awards ==
- Order For Merit to the Fatherland IV class (2000)
- Order of Honour (Russian Federation) (2001)
- Honored Master of Sports of the Russia (2000)
