= Nazmi Avluca =

Turkish sports wrestler (born 1976)

Personal information
- Nationality: Turkish
- Born: November 14, 1976 (age 49) Kargı, Çorum Province, Turkey
- Height: 1.77 m (5 ft 10 in)
- Weight: 84 kg (185 lb)

Sport
- Sport: Wrestling
- Event: Greco-Roman
- Club: Ankara ASKİ Sport Club
- Turned pro: 1996
- Coached by: Mehmet Akif Pirim
Medal record
Men's Greco-Roman wrestling
Representing Turkey
Olympic Games
Bronze medal – third place	2008 Beijing	84 kg
World Championships
Gold medal – first place	1999 Athens	76 kg
Gold medal – first place	2009 Herning	84 kg
Silver medal – second place	2006 Guangzhou	84 kg
Bronze medal – third place	1998 Gaevle	76 kg
Bronze medal – third place	2005 Budapest	84 kg
Bronze medal – third place	2011 Istanbul	84 kg
European Championships
Gold medal – first place	1996 Budapest	74 kg
Gold medal – first place	2004 Haparanda	84 kg
Gold medal – first place	2008 Tampere	84 kg
Gold medal – first place	2010 Baku	84 kg
Silver medal – second place	2009 Vilnius	84 kg
Bronze medal – third place	1998 Minsk	76 kg
Bronze medal – third place	2001 Istanbul	76 kg
Bronze medal – third place	2006 Moscow	84 kg
World Cup
Gold medal – first place	2001 Levallois	76 kg
Gold medal – first place	2010 Yerevan	84 kg
Silver medal – second place	1997 Tehran	76 kg
Silver medal – second place	2002 Cairo	84 kg
Silver medal – second place	2003 Alma Ata	84 kg
Golden Grand Prix
Gold medal – first place	2006 Baku	84 kg
World Military Championships
Gold medal – first place	2003 Istanbul	84 kg
World University Championships
Gold medal – first place	2002 Edmonton	84 kg
World Junior Championships
Silver medal – second place	1994 Budapest	74 kg
World Espoir Championships
Bronze medal – third place	1995 Tehran	74 kg
World Cadets Championships
Gold medal – first place	1992 Istanbul	60 kg

Nazmi Avluca (pronounced [ˈnazmiː ˈavludʒa]; born November 14, 1976, in Kargı, Çorum Province), is a Turkish sports wrestler, who has won several titles at international competitions including four European and two FILA Wrestling World Championships in the Men's Greco-Roman category.

== Wrestling career ==
Nazmi Avluca took also part at the 1996 and 2000 Olympics without success, and then finally achieved Olympic success with a bronze medal in 2008 in Beijing. He also competed at the 2012 Summer Olympics. Currently, he is an active member of the Emlakspor club in Istanbul.

Born in the Central Anatolian town Kargı of Çorum Province, he began early sport wrestling at the Wrestling Training Center in Bolu in 1987. Admitted to the national Greco-Roman team in 1991, he won his first international gold in the 60 kg division at the 1992 World Cadets Championships held in Istanbul.

Nazmi Avluca was transferred to the German wrestling club 1. Luckenwalder SC in 2005, where undefeated, he helped his team become the German champions in 2006 for the first time in their club history. He returned home to join Şekerspor Club in Konya before the 2006 World Championships

== Honors ==
- "Best Wrestler of 2006 in Greco-Roman Style" awarded by the International Federation of Associated Wrestling Styles (FILA).
