= Cuba at the 2004 Summer Olympics =

- IOC code: CUB
- NOC: Cuban Olympic Committee

in Athens
- Competitors: 151 in 18 sports
- Flag bearer: Iván Pedroso
- Medals Ranked 11th: Gold 9 Silver 7 Bronze 11 Total 27

Summer Olympics appearances (overview)
- 1900; 1904; 1908–1920; 1924; 1928; 1932–1936; 1948; 1952; 1956; 1960; 1964; 1968; 1972; 1976; 1980; 1984–1988; 1992; 1996; 2000; 2004; 2008; 2012; 2016; 2020; 2024

Cuba competed at the 2004 Summer Olympics in Athens, Greece, from 13 to 29 August 2004. This was the nation's seventeenth appearance in the Olympics, except for some editions. Cuban athletes did not attend in two Olympic Games (1984 and 1988), where they joined the Soviet and North Korean boycott. Cuban Olympic Committee sent the nation's smallest delegation to the Games since 1972. A total of 151 athletes, 97 men and 54 women, competed in 18 sports.

The Cuban team featured seven defending Olympic champions from Sydney: taekwondo jin Ángel Matos in the men's welterweight division, the women's volleyball team (led by Yumilka Ruíz), boxers Mario Kindelán and Guillermo Rigondeaux, Greco-Roman wrestler Filiberto Azcuy, sprint hurdler Anier García, and long jumper Iván Pedroso, who later became the nation's flag bearer in the opening ceremony. Among the champions, Kindelan and Rigondeaux managed to defend Olympic titles in their respective weight categories. Skeet shooter Guillermo Alfredo Torres, the oldest athlete of the team at age 45, became the first Cuban athlete to compete in five Olympic Games since 1980; meanwhile, judoka Yamila Zambrano was the youngest of the team at age 18.

Cuba left Athens with a total of 27 Olympic medals (9 gold, 7 silver, and 11 bronze), failing only two golds short of the total record achieved from Sydney. Eight of these medals were awarded to the athletes in boxing, six in judo, and five in athletics. Cuba's team-based athletes proved successful in Athens, as men's baseball and women's volleyball teams won gold and bronze medals, respectively. Among the nation's gold medalists were Osleidys Menéndez, who previously won the bronze in Sydney and also, became the first non-European athlete to claim an Olympic title in women's javelin throw since María Caridad Colón did so in 1980. On August 23, 2004, the International Olympic Committee stripped off Russia's Irina Korzhanenko shot put title after failing the doping test for stanozolol, and the gold medal was subsequently awarded to Yumileidi Cumbá at the conclusion of the Games.

== Medalists ==
Medal	Name	Sport	Event	Date
Gold	Yumileidi Cumbá	Athletics	Women's shot put	August 18
Gold	Cuba national baseball team: Danny Betancourt; Luis Borroto; Frederich Cepeda; Yorelvis Charles; Michel Enríquez; Norberto González; Yulieski Gourriel; Pedro Luis Lazo; Roger Machado; Jonder Martínez; Danny Miranda; Frank Montieth; Vicyohandri Odelín; Adiel Palma; Eduardo Paret; Ariel Pestano; Alexei Ramírez; Eriel Sánchez; Antonio Scull; Carlos Tabares; Yoandry Urgellés; Osmani Urrutia; Manuel Vega; Norge Luis Vera	Baseball	Men's tournament	August 25
Gold	Osleidys Menéndez	Athletics	Women's javelin throw	August 27
Gold	Yuriorkis Gamboa	Boxing	Flyweight	August 28
Gold	Odlanier Solís	Boxing	Heavyweight	August 28
Gold	Yan Bartelemí	Boxing	Light flyweight	August 29
Gold	Guillermo Rigondeaux	Boxing	Bantamweight	August 29
Gold	Mario Kindelán	Boxing	Lightweight	August 29
Gold	Yandro Quintana	Wrestling	Men's freestyle 60 kg	August 29
Silver	Daima Beltrán	Judo	Women's +78 kg	August 20
Silver	Yipsi Moreno	Athletics	Women's hammer throw	August 25
Silver	Yanelis Labrada	Taekwondo	Women's 49 kg	August 25
Silver	Roberto Monzón	Wrestling	Men's Greco-Roman 60 kg	August 26
Silver	Yudel Johnson	Boxing	Light welterweight	August 28
Silver	Ledis Balceiro; Ibrahim Rojas	Canoeing	Men's C-2 500 m	August 28
Silver	Lorenzo Aragón	Boxing	Welterweight	August 29
Bronze	Yordanis Arencibia	Judo	Men's 66 kg	August 15
Bronze	Amarilis Savón	Judo	Women's 52 kg	August 15
Bronze	Yurisleydis Lupetey	Judo	Women's 57 kg	August 16
Bronze	Driulis González	Judo	Women's 63 kg	August 17
Bronze	Yurisel Laborde	Judo	Women's 78 kg	August 19
Bronze	Juan Miguel Rodríguez	Shooting	Men's skeet	August 22
Bronze	Yunaika Crawford	Athletics	Women's hammer throw	August 25
Bronze	Anier García	Athletics	Men's 110 m hurdles	August 27
Bronze	Michel López Núñez	Boxing	Super heavyweight	August 29
Bronze	Cuba women's national volleyball team: Zoila Barros; Rosir Calderón; Nancy Carrillo; Ana Fernández; Maybelis Martínez; Liana Mesa; Anniara Muñoz; Yaima Ortíz; Daimí Ramírez; Yumilka Ruíz; Marta Sánchez; Dulce Téllez	Volleyball	Women's tournament	August 29
Bronze	Iván Fundora	Wrestling	Men's freestyle 74 kg	August 29

Medals by sport
Sport	1st place, gold medalist(s)	2nd place, silver medalist(s)	3rd place, bronze medalist(s)	Total
Boxing	5	2	1	8
Athletics	2	1	2	5
Wrestling	1	1	1	3
Baseball	1	0	0	1
Judo	0	1	5	6
Canoeing	0	1	0	1
Taekwondo	0	1	0	1
Shooting	0	0	1	1
Volleyball	0	0	1	1
Total	9	7	11	27

== Archery ==
One Cuban archer qualified for the women's individual archery.

Athlete	Event	Ranking round		Round of 64	Round of 32	Round of 16	Quarterfinals	Semifinals	Final / BM	
Athlete	Event	Score	Seed	Opposition Score	Opposition Score	Opposition Score	Opposition Score	Opposition Score	Opposition Score	Rank
Maydenia Sarduy	Women's individual	595	58	Mospinek (POL); L 145–162	Did not advance					

== Athletics ==
Cuban athletes have so far achieved qualifying standards in the following athletics events (up to a maximum of 3 athletes in each event at the 'A' Standard, and 1 at the 'B' Standard).

Yumileidi Cumbá originally claimed a silver medal in women's shot put. On August 23, 2004, the International Olympic Committee stripped off Russia's Irina Korzhanenko shot put title after failing the doping test for stanozolol. Following the announcement of Annus' disqualification, Cumba's medal was eventually upgraded to gold.

Key

- Note–Ranks given for track events are within the athlete's heat only
- Q = Qualified for the next round
- q = Qualified for the next round as a fastest loser or, in field events, by position without achieving the qualifying target
- NR = National record
- N/A = Round not applicable for the event
- Bye = Athlete not required to compete in round

Men
Track & road events

Athlete	Event	Heat		Quarterfinal		Semifinal		Final	
Athlete	Event	Result	Rank	Result	Rank	Result	Rank	Result	Rank
Anier García	110 m hurdles	13.24	1 Q	13.28	2 Q	13.30	3 Q	13.20	3rd place, bronze medalist(s)
Yoel Hernández	110 m hurdles	13.41	2 Q	13.29	2 Q	13.37	6	Did not advance	
Yuniel Hernández	110 m hurdles	13.48	4 Q	13.46	4 Q	DNS		Did not advance	
Yeimer López	400 m	45.44	2 Q	—N/a		45.52	4	Did not advance	
Yacnier Luis	400 m hurdles	DSQ		—N/a		Did not advance			
Aguelmis Rojas	Marathon	—N/a						2:21:59	47

Field events

Athlete	Event	Qualification		Final	
Athlete	Event	Distance	Position	Distance	Position
Yoandri Betanzos	Triple jump	17.53	2 Q	17.47	4
Frank Casañas	Discus throw	60.60	17	Did not advance	
Arnie David Giralt	Triple jump	16.70	17	Did not advance	
Isbel Luaces	Javelin throw	80.07	13	Did not advance	
Lois Maikel Martínez	Discus throw	57.18	29	Did not advance	
Iván Pedroso	Long jump	8.05	11 q	8.23	7
Lisvany Pérez	High jump	2.28	=4 Q	2.25	11
Yoelbi Quesada	Triple jump	17.01	9 Q	16.96	8

Women
Track & road events

Athlete	Event	Heat		Semifinal		Final	
Athlete	Event	Result	Rank	Result	Rank	Result	Rank
Zulia Calatayud	800 m	2:03.99	3 Q	1:59.21	4 q	2:00.95	8
Mariela González	Marathon	—N/a				3:02:20	59
Daimí Pernía	400 m hurdles	55.91	5	Did not advance			
Anay Tejeda	100 m hurdles	13.24	5	Did not advance			
Virgen Benavides; Roxana Díaz; Miladis Lazo; Ana López	4 × 100 m relay	43.60	6	—N/a		Did not advance	

Field events

Athlete	Event	Qualification		Final	
Athlete	Event	Distance	Position	Distance	Position
Noraida Bicet	Javelin throw	60.97	12 q	62.51	7
Yusmay Bicet	Triple jump	14.53	14 Q	14.57	9
Sonia Bisset	Javelin throw	61.45	8 Q	63.54	5
Yunaika Crawford	Hammer throw	71.74	2 Q	73.16	3rd place, bronze medalist(s)
Yumileidi Cumbá	Shot put	19.10	2 Q	19.59	1st place, gold medalist(s)
Yudelkis Fernández	Long jump	6.36	30	Did not advance	
Yania Ferrales	Discus throw	61.54	10 q	NM	—
Misleydis González	Shot put	18.33	10 q	18.59	7
Osleidys Menéndez	Javelin throw	64.91	1 Q	71.53 OR	1st place, gold medalist(s)
Yipsi Moreno	Hammer throw	70.56	7 Q	73.36	2nd place, silver medalist(s)
Aldenay Vasallo	Hammer throw	62.64	37	Did not advance	

== Baseball ==
Roster

Manager: 39 – Higinio Vélez

Coach: 22 – Carlos Pérez Cepero, 30 – Pedro José Delgado Pérez, 34 – José Sánchez Elosegui, 41 – Francisco Laza Escaurrido Chapelle

Pos.	No.	Player	Date of birth (age)	Bats	Throws	Club
IF	2	Eduardo Paret Pérez	23 October 1972 (aged 31)			(Cuba) Centrales
C	8	Ariel Pestano	31 January 1974 (aged 30)			(Cuba) Centrales
IF	10	Yulieski Gourriel Castillo	9 June 1984 (aged 20)			(Cuba) Centrales
IF	12	Michel Enríquez Tamayo	11 February 1979 (aged 25)			(Cuba) Occidentales
OF	14	Yoandri Urgelles Cobas	28 July 1981 (aged 23)			(Cuba) Industriales
P	15	Danny Betancourt Chacón	25 May 1981 (aged 23)			(Cuba) Orientales
P	16	Adiel Palma López	20 August 1970 (aged 33)			(Cuba) Centrales
P	20	Norge Luis Vera Peralta	3 August 1971 (aged 33)			(Cuba) Orientales
OF	21	Alexei Ramírez Rodriguez	22 September 1981 (aged 22)			(Cuba) Occidentales
P	23	Vicyohandri Odelín Saname	26 February 1980 (aged 24)			(Cuba) Orientales
OF	24	Frederich Cepeda Cruz	8 April 1980 (aged 24)			(Cuba) Centrales
IF	25	Antonio Scull Hernández	10 September 1985 (aged 18)			(Cuba) Industriales
P	26	Luis Borroto Jiménez	24 August 1982 (aged 21)			(Cuba) Centrales
P	28	Frank Andy Montieth Herrera	11 January 1985 (aged 19)			(Cuba) Industriales
IF	31	Yorelvis Charles Martínez	25 September 1978 (aged 25)			(Cuba) Centrales
P	32	Norberto Gonzalez Miranda	10 October 1979 (aged 24)			(Cuba) Centrales
OF	46	Osmani Urrutia	28 June 1979 (aged 25)			(Cuba) Orientales
IF	55	Eriel Leon Sánchez	17 May 1975 (aged 29)			(Cuba) Orientales
OF	56	Carlos Alberto Tabares Padilla	8 July 1974 (aged 30)			(Cuba) Industriales
P	58	Jonder Martínez	22 June 1978 (aged 26)			(Cuba) Occidentales
C	61	Roger Machado Morales	31 March 1974 (aged 30)			(Cuba) Occidentales
IF	74	Danny Miranda Agramonte	12 November 1978 (aged 25)			(Cuba) Occidentales
P	91	Manuel Alberto Vega Tamayo	9 August 1975 (aged 29)			(Cuba) Orientales
P	99	Pedro Luis Lazo	15 April 1973 (aged 31)			(Cuba) Occidentales

Round robin

Team	W	L	Tiebreaker
Japan	6	1	1-0
Cuba	6	1	0-1
Canada	5	2	-
Australia	4	3	-
Chinese Taipei	3	4	-
Netherlands	2	5	-
Greece	1	6	1-0
Italy	1	6	0-1

Team	1	2	3	4	5	6	7	8	9	R	H	E
Australia	0	0	0	0	0	0	0	0	1	1	5	3
Cuba	1	0	1	0	0	1	1	0	x	4	10	1
WP: Adiel Palma (1-0) LP: Craig Anderson (0-1) Sv: Jonder Martinez (1S); Home runs: AUS: None; CUB: M. Enriquez in 1st, 1 RBI; O.Urrutia in 6th, 1 RBI

Team	1	2	3	4	5	6	7	8	9	R	H	E
Greece	0	0	0	1	0	0	0	0	3	4	3	1
Cuba	1	1	0	0	0	1	2	0	x	5	10	1
WP: Norge Luis Vera (1-0) LP: Jared Theodorakos (0-1) Sv: Pedro Luis Lazo (1S); Home runs: GRE: None; CUB: F. Cepeda in 2nd, 1 RBI; M. Enriquez in 6th, 1 RBI; A. Pestano in 7th, 2 RBIs

Team	1	2	3	4	5	6	7	8	9	R	H	E
Japan	0	2	0	2	0	0	1	0	1	6	12	2
Cuba	0	0	0	0	0	0	0	0	3	3	7	2
WP: Daisuke Matsuzaka (1-0) LP: Vicyohandri Odelín (0-1) Sv: Hirotoshi Ishii (1S); Home runs: JPN: K. Jojima in 4th, 1 RBI; N. Nakamura in 4th, 1 RBI; K. Wada in 2nd, 2 RBIs; CUB: None

Team	1	2	3	4	5	6	7	8	9	R	H	E
Cuba	0	1	2	0	0	0	0	5	2	10	15	1
Chinese Taipei	0	0	0	0	0	0	0	1	1	2	6	1
WP: Luis Borroto (1-0) LP: Tu Chang-Wei (0-1) Sv: Danny Betancourt (1S); Home runs: CUB: E. Sanchez in 2nd, 1 RBI; TPE: None

Team	1	2	3	4	5	6	7	8	9	R	H	E
Netherlands	0	0	0	0	0	0	0	1	1	2	5	0
Cuba	0	0	5	0	4	0	0	0	x	9	12	0
WP: Adiel Palma (1-0) LP: Eelco Jansen (0-1); Home runs: NED: E. J. 'T Hoen in 8th, 1 RBI; Y. de Casterin 9th, 1 RBI; CUB: None

Team	1	2	3	4	5	6	7	8	9	R	H	E
Cuba	0	3	0	0	1	0	0	1	0	5	10	0
Canada	0	0	0	0	0	0	2	0	0	2	7	1
WP: Norberto González (1-0) LP: Jason Dickson (1-1) Sv: Pedro Luis Lazo (2S); Home runs: CUB: A. Scull in 2nd, 2 RBIs; CAN: None

Team	1	2	3	4	5	6	7	8	9	R	H	E
Cuba	0	3	1	0	0	0	0	1	0	5	11	0
Italy	0	0	0	0	0	0	0	0	0	0	2	1
WP: Luis Borroto (2-0) LP: Michael Marchesano (0-2)

Semifinal

Team	1	2	3	4	5	6	7	8	9	R	H	E
Canada	0	0	1	0	2	0	0	0	2	5	9	1
Cuba	2	0	0	0	0	0	0	6	x	8	13	2
WP: Danny Betancourt (1-0-1) LP: Chris Begg (0-1); Home runs: CAN: R. Radmanovich in 9th, 1 RBI; CUB: None

Gold Medal Final

Team	1	2	3	4	5	6	7	8	9	R	H	E
Cuba	0	0	0	2	0	4	0	0	0	6	13	1
Australia	0	0	0	0	1	0	0	1	0	2	7	0
WP: Adiel Palma (3-0) LP: John Stephens (0-2) Sv: Danny Betancourt (1-0-2); Home runs: CUB: F. Cepeda in 4th, 2 RBIs; AUS: P. Gonzalez in 5th, 1 RBI

Won Gold Medal

== Boxing ==
Cuba, by far the most successful country at boxing in the 2004 Olympics, entered a boxer in each of the 11 weight classes in Athens. None of the seven boxers with a round of 32 match lost it. Only one of the boxers fell in the round of 16 (also the only boxer not to win a match), with the other ten advancing to quarterfinals. Two lost there, while the remaining eight ensured medals for themselves by winning their quarterfinal matches. One lost in the semifinal, earning a bronze medal. Of the seven Cuban boxers that advanced to the final bout in their weight classes, five won the match to take gold and two lost to claim silver medals.

Athlete	Event	Round of 32	Round of 16	Quarterfinals	Semifinals	Final	
Athlete	Event	Opposition Result	Opposition Result	Opposition Result	Opposition Result	Opposition Result	Rank
Yan Bartelemí	Light flyweight	Miranda (VEN); W RSC	Pannon (THA); W 23–14	Hong M-W (KOR); W 30–11	Zou Sm (CHN); W 29–17	Yalçınkaya (TUR); W 21–16	1st place, gold medalist(s)
Yuriorkis Gamboa	Flyweight	Samoilenco (MDA); W 46–33	Jongjohor (THA); W 26–21	Balakshin (RUS); W 26–18	Rahimov (GER); W 20–11	Thomas (FRA); W 38–23	1st place, gold medalist(s)
Guillermo Rigondeaux	Bantamweight	Liu Y (CHN); W 21–7	Lassi (PAK); W RSC	Kovalev (RUS); W 20–5	Sultonov (UZB); W 27–13	Petchkoom (THA); W 22–13	1st place, gold medalist(s)
Luis Franco	Featherweight	Talasbayev (KGZ); W 32–15	Oliveira (BRA); W 30–15	Tajbert (GER); L 26–34	Did not advance		
Mario Kindelán	Lightweight	Sadiq (NGR); W RSC	Shah (PAK); W 24–9	Huseynov (AZE); W 23–11	Khrachev (RUS); W 20–10	Khan (GBR); W 30–22	1st place, gold medalist(s)
Yudel Johnson	Light welterweight	Bye	Mwale (ZAM); W RSC	Mahmudov (UZB); W 32–28	Georgiev (BUL); W 13–9	Boonjumnong (THA); L 11–17	2nd place, silver medalist(s)
Lorenzo Aragón	Welterweight	Kotakos (GRE); W RSC	Martirosyan (USA); W 16–14	Khairov (AZE); W 32–28	Kim J-J (KOR); W 38–10	Artayev (KAZ); L 26–36	2nd place, silver medalist(s)
Yordanis Despaigne	Middleweight	Pascal (CAN); W 36–24	Balzsay (HUN); W 38–25	Dirrell (USA); L 11–12	Did not advance		
Yoan Pablo Hernández	Light heavyweight	Bye	Makarenko (RUS); L 18–30	Did not advance			
Odlanier Solís	Heavyweight	—N/a	Alekseyev (RUS); W 24–21	Vasquez (VEN); W 24–4	Al Shami (SYR); W RSC	Zuyev (BLR); W 22–13	1st place, gold medalist(s)
Michel López Núñez	Super heavyweight	—N/a	Saidov (UZB); W 18–13	Estrada (USA); W 21–7	Aly (EGY); L 16–18	Did not advance	3rd place, bronze medalist(s)

== Canoeing ==
=== Sprint ===
Athlete	Event	Heats		Semifinals		Final	
Athlete	Event	Time	Rank	Time	Rank	Time	Rank
Karel Aguilar Chacon	Men's C-1 1000 m	3:54.250	3 q	3:52.260	2 Q	3:54.957	8
Aldo Pruna Díaz	Men's C-1 500 m	1:50.426	3 q	1:53.229	4	Did not advance	
Ledis Balceiro; Ibrahim Rojas	Men's C-2 500 m	1:39.860	2 Q	Bye		1:40.350	2nd place, silver medalist(s)
Ledis Balceiro; Ibrahim Rojas	Men's C-2 1000 m	3:30.435	2 Q	Bye		3:50.346	8

Qualification Legend: Q = Qualify to final; q = Qualify to semifinal

== Cycling ==
=== Track ===
Sprint

Athlete	Event	Qualification		Round 1	Final	
Athlete	Event	Time Speed (km/h)	Rank	Opposition Time Speed (km/h)	Opposition Time Speed (km/h)	Rank
Reinier Cartaya; Julio César Herrera; Ahmed López	Men's team sprint	45.458; 59.278	10	Did not advance		

Time trial

Athlete	Event	Time	Rank
Ahmed López	Men's time trial	1:02.739	9

Omnium

Athlete	Event	Points	Laps	Rank
Yoanka González	Women's points race	5	0	10

== Diving ==
Cuban divers qualified for eight individual diving spots at the 2004 Olympic Games.

Men

Athlete	Event	Preliminaries		Semifinals		Final	
Athlete	Event	Points	Rank	Points	Rank	Points	Rank
Jorge Betancourt	3 m springboard	382.56	21	Did not advance			
Erick Fornaris	3 m springboard	380.07	22	Did not advance			
Erick Fornaris	10 m platform	351.75	28	Did not advance			
José Guerra	10 m platform	375.87	25	Did not advance			
Jorge Betancourt; Erick Fornaris	3 m synchronized springboard	—N/a				338.46	4

Women

Athlete	Event	Preliminaries		Semifinals		Final	
Athlete	Event	Points	Rank	Points	Rank	Points	Rank
Iohana Cruz	3 m springboard	203.76	29	Did not advance			
Yaima Mena	10 m platform	238.44	30	Did not advance			
Yolanda Ortiz	10 m platform	259.47	26	Did not advance			

== Fencing ==
Four Cuban fencers (two men and two women) qualified for the following events:

Men

Athlete	Event	Round of 64	Round of 32	Round of 16	Quarterfinal	Semifinal	Final / BM	
Athlete	Event	Opposition Score	Opposition Score	Opposition Score	Opposition Score	Opposition Score	Opposition Score	Rank
Andrés Carillo	Individual épée	Bye	Obry (FRA); W 15–10	Boisse (FRA); L 11–15	Did not advance			
Cándido Maya	Individual sabre	Kembe (CGO); W 15–13	Sharikov (RUS); L 9–15	Did not advance				

Women

Athlete	Event	Round of 64	Round of 32	Round of 16	Quarterfinal	Semifinal	Final / BM	
Athlete	Event	Opposition Score	Opposition Score	Opposition Score	Opposition Score	Opposition Score	Opposition Score	Rank
Eimey Gómez	Individual épée	Dunnette (CAN); W 11–9	Flessel-Colovic (FRA); L 9–15	Did not advance				
Ana Faez Miclin	Individual sabre	—N/a	Lee S-M (KOR); W 15–13	Jacobson (USA); L 4–15	Did not advance			

== Gymnastics ==
=== Artistic ===
Men

Athlete	Event	Qualification								Final							
Athlete	Event	Apparatus						Total	Rank	Apparatus						Total	Rank
Athlete	Event	F	PH	R	V	PB	HB	Total	Rank	F	PH	R	V	PB	HB	Total	Rank
Abel Driggs Santos	All-around	8.875	9.600	9.550	9.012	9.425	8.812	55.274	28	Did not advance							
Eric López Ríos	All-around	9.062	9.500	9.637	9.400	9.687	9.112	56.398	18 Q	9.137	8.600	9.500	9.700	9.675	8.837	55.449	20

Women

Athlete	Event	Qualification						Final					
Athlete	Event	Apparatus				Total	Rank	Apparatus				Total	Rank
Athlete	Event	V	UB	BB	F	Total	Rank	V	UB	BB	F	Total	Rank
Leyanet González Calero	All-around	9.337	8.787	8.775	9.325	36.224	30 Q	9.325	8.725	8.012	9.237	35.299	22

== Judo ==
Twelve Cuban judoka (five men and seven women) qualified for the 2004 Summer Olympics.

Men

Athlete	Event	Round of 32	Round of 16	Quarterfinals	Semifinals	Repechage 1	Repechage 2	Repechage 3	Final / BM	
Athlete	Event	Opposition Result	Opposition Result	Opposition Result	Opposition Result	Opposition Result	Opposition Result	Opposition Result	Opposition Result	Rank
Yordanis Arencibia	−66 kg	Ortíz (VEN); W 0101–0010	Young (AUS); W 1001–0001	Pina (POR); W 1001–0001	Krnáč (SVK); L 0002–1010	Bye			Margoshvili (GEO); W 0200–0000	3rd place, bronze medalist(s)
Rubert Martínez	−73 kg	Razvozov (ISR); L 0000–1000	Did not advance							
Gabriel Arteaga	−81 kg	Nyamkhüü (MGL); W 0130–0001	Kwon Y-W (KOR); L 0001–0010	Did not advance						
Yosvany Despaigne	−90 kg	Taov (RUS); L 0001–0011	Did not advance							
Oreidis Despaigne	−100 kg	Bubon (UKR); W 0100–0010	Jurack (GER); L 0000–1001	Did not advance		Illadis (GRE); W 1000–0010	Lemaire (FRA); L 0000–0221	Did not advance		

Women

Athlete	Event	Round of 32	Round of 16	Quarterfinals	Semifinals	Repechage 1	Repechage 2	Repechage 3	Final / BM	
Athlete	Event	Opposition Result	Opposition Result	Opposition Result	Opposition Result	Opposition Result	Opposition Result	Opposition Result	Opposition Result	Rank
Yamila Zambrano	−48 kg	Bye	Haddad (ALG); L 0000–1110	Did not advance						
Amarilis Savón	−52 kg	Askelöf (SWE); W 1000–0000	Lee E-H (KOR); W 1010–0000	Heylen (BEL); W 0101–0000	Yokosawa (JPN); L 0010–1000	Bye			Souakri (ALG); W 1000–0000	3rd place, bronze medalist(s)
Yurisleydis Lupetey	−57 kg	Bye	Harel (FRA); W 1000–0000	Göldi (SUI); W WO	Kye S-H (PRK); L 0000–1000	Bye			Fernández (ESP); W 0010–0000	3rd place, bronze medalist(s)
Driulis González	−63 kg	Bye	Žolnir (SLO); L 0001–0010	Did not advance		Bye	Vandecaveye (BEL); W 1000–0000	Hong O-S (PRK); W 1010–0000	Krukower (ARG); W WO	3rd place, bronze medalist(s)
Anaysi Hernandez	−70 kg	Moreira (ANG); L 0000–1000	Did not advance							
Yurisel Laborde	−78 kg	Bye	Kühnen (GER); W 0011–0001	Liu X (CHN); L 0000–1001	Did not advance	Bye	Moskalyuk (RUS); W 1001–0000	Lee S-Y (KOR); W 0030–0022	Lebrun (FRA); W 1001–0001	3rd place, bronze medalist(s)
Daima Beltrán	+78 kg	Bryant (GBR); W 0030–0010	Bvegadzi (CGO); W 1000–0000	Blanco (VEN); W 1001–0000	Sun Fm (CHN); W 1000–0000	Bye			Tsukada (JPN); L 0100–1000	2nd place, silver medalist(s)

== Rowing ==
Cuban rowers qualified the following boats:

Men

Athlete	Event	Heats		Repechage		Semifinals		Final	
Athlete	Event	Time	Rank	Time	Rank	Time	Rank	Time	Rank
Yuleidys Cascaret	Single sculls	7:19.45	2 R	6:58.44	1 SA/B/C	6:58.35	4 FB	6:58.61	12
Yoennis Hernández; Yosbel Martínez	Double sculls	7:20.95	5 R	6:16.38	2 SA/B	6:24.54	5 FB	6:15.37	9
Armando Arrechavaleta; Yosvel Iglesias	Lightweight double sculls	6:25.14	5 R	6:27.89	4 SC/D	6:28.09	2 FC	6:48.50	14

Women

Athlete	Event	Heats		Repechage		Semifinals		Final	
Athlete	Event	Time	Rank	Time	Rank	Time	Rank	Time	Rank
Ismaray Marrero; Dailin Taset	Lightweight double sculls	7:18.35	5 R	7:14.01	4 FC	Bye		7:42.20	14

Qualification Legend: FA=Final A (medal); FB=Final B (non-medal); FC=Final C (non-medal); FD=Final D (non-medal); FE=Final E (non-medal); FF=Final F (non-medal); SA/B=Semifinals A/B; SC/D=Semifinals C/D; SE/F=Semifinals E/F; R=Repechage

== Shooting ==
Eight Cuban shooters (six men and two women) qualified to compete in the following events:

Men

Athlete	Event	Qualification		Final	
Athlete	Event	Points	Rank	Points	Rank
Norbelis Bárzaga	10 m air pistol	573	=30	Did not advance	
Norbelis Bárzaga	50 m pistol	542	=34	Did not advance	
Arseny Borrero	50 m pistol	535	40	Did not advance	
Reinier Estpinan	50 m rifle prone	581	46	Did not advance	
Leuris Pupo	25 m rapid fire pistol	585	=7	Did not advance	
Juan Miguel Rodríguez	Skeet	122 (4)	=3 Q	147 (10)	3rd place, bronze medalist(s)
Guillermo Alfredo Torres	Skeet	119	=21	Did not advance	

Women

Athlete	Event	Qualification		Final	
Athlete	Event	Points	Rank	Points	Rank
Eglis Yaima Cruz	10 m air rifle	385	39	Did not advance	
Eglis Yaima Cruz	50 m rifle 3 positions	571	=20	Did not advance	
Margarita Tarradell	10 m air pistol	368	=35	Did not advance	
Margarita Tarradell	25 m pistol	565	=32	Did not advance	

== Swimming ==
Cuban swimmers earned qualifying standards in the following events (up to a maximum of 2 swimmers in each event at the A-standard time, and 1 at the B-standard time):

Men

Athlete	Event	Heat		Semifinal		Final	
Athlete	Event	Time	Rank	Time	Rank	Time	Rank
Marcos Hernández	50 m freestyle	23.19	34	Did not advance			

Women

Athlete	Event	Heat		Semifinal		Final	
Athlete	Event	Time	Rank	Time	Rank	Time	Rank
Imaday Núñez González	100 m breaststroke	1:12.14	27	Did not advance			
Imaday Núñez González	200 m breaststroke	2:36.40	28	Did not advance			

== Taekwondo ==
Two Cuban taekwondo jin qualified for the following events.

Athlete	Event	Round of 16	Quarterfinals	Semifinals	Repechage 1	Repechage 2	Final / BM	
Athlete	Event	Opposition Result	Opposition Result	Opposition Result	Opposition Result	Opposition Result	Opposition Result	Rank
Ángel Matos	Men's −80 kg	Estrada (MEX); L 7–8	Did not advance					
Yanelis Labrada	Women's −49 kg	Bye	Boorapolchai (THA); W 3–1	Carías (GUA); W 8–3	Bye		Chen S-H (TPE); L 4–5	2nd place, silver medalist(s)

== Volleyball ==
=== Beach ===
Athlete	Event	Preliminary round	Standing	Round of 16	Quarterfinals	Semifinals	Final	
Athlete	Event	Opposition Score	Standing	Opposition Score	Opposition Score	Opposition Score	Opposition Score	Rank
Francisco Álvarez; Juan Rossell	Men's	Pool B Dieckmann – Scheuerpflug (GER); L 1 – 2 (19–21, 21–19, 10–15); Araújo – Insfran (BRA); L 0 – 2 (21–23, 20–22); Canet – Hamel (FRA); W 2 – 0 (21–18, 21–19)	3	Did not advance				
Dalixia Fernández; Tamara Larrea	Women's	Pool B Gattelli – Perrotta (ITA); W 2 – 1 (21–17, 18–21, 15–10); Naidoo – Willand (RSA); W 2 – 0 (21–19, 21–16); Bede – Behar (BRA); L 0 – 2 (14–21, 19–21)	2 Q	Dumont – Martin (CAN); L 0 – 2 (18–21, 19–21)	Did not advance			

=== Indoor ===
==== Women's tournament ====
Roster

The following is the Cuban roster in the women's volleyball tournament of the 2004 Summer Olympics.

Head coach: Luis Felipe Calderón

No.	Name	Date of birth	Height	Weight	Spike	Block	2004 club
1	Yumilka Ruíz (C)	5 August 1978	1.79 m (5 ft 10 in)	62 kg (137 lb)	329 cm (130 in)	315 cm (124 in)	(Cuba) Camagüey
3	Nancy Carrillo	11 January 1986	1.90 m (6 ft 3 in)	74 kg (163 lb)	318 cm (125 in)	315 cm (124 in)	(Cuba) Ciudad de La Habana
5	Maybelis Martínez (L)	13 June 1977	1.78 m (5 ft 10 in)	79 kg (174 lb)	322 cm (127 in)	306 cm (120 in)	(Cuba) Ciudad de La Habana
6	Daimí Ramírez	8 October 1983	1.81 m (5 ft 11 in)	67 kg (148 lb)	305 cm (120 in)	290 cm (110 in)	(Cuba) Camagüey
8	Yaima Ortíz	9 November 1981	1.78 m (5 ft 10 in)	70 kg (150 lb)	325 cm (128 in)	313 cm (123 in)	(Cuba) Ciudad de La Habana
10	Ana Fernández	3 August 1973	1.86 m (6 ft 1 in)	78 kg (172 lb)	325 cm (128 in)	316 cm (124 in)	(Cuba) Sancti Spíritus
11	Liana Mesa	26 December 1977	1.82 m (6 ft 0 in)	70 kg (150 lb)	318 cm (125 in)	307 cm (121 in)	(Cuba) Camagüey
12	Rosir Calderón	28 December 1984	1.89 m (6 ft 2 in)	66 kg (146 lb)	330 cm (130 in)	325 cm (128 in)	(Cuba) Ciudad de La Habana
13	Anniara Muñoz	24 January 1980	1.80 m (5 ft 11 in)	69 kg (152 lb)	320 cm (130 in)	312 cm (123 in)	(Cuba) Cienfuegos
16	Dulce Téllez	12 September 1983	1.86 m (6 ft 1 in)	69 kg (152 lb)	320 cm (130 in)	316 cm (124 in)	Santiago de Cuba
17	Marta Sánchez	17 May 1973	1.84 m (6 ft 0 in)	75 kg (165 lb)	324 cm (128 in)	310 cm (120 in)	(Cuba) Holguín
18	Zoila Barros	6 August 1976	1.87 m (6 ft 2 in)	76 kg (168 lb)	325 cm (128 in)	312 cm (123 in)	(Cuba) Ciudad de La Habana

Group play

Pos	Team	Pld	W	L	Pts	SW	SL	SR	SPW	SPL	SPR	Qualification
1	China	5	4	1	9	14	4	3.500	429	346	1.240	Quarterfinals
2	Russia	5	3	2	8	11	8	1.375	426	388	1.098	Quarterfinals
3	Cuba	5	3	2	8	11	10	1.100	443	460	0.963	Quarterfinals
4	United States	5	2	3	7	11	10	1.100	472	467	1.011	Quarterfinals
5	Germany	5	2	3	7	7	11	0.636	387	414	0.935	
6	Dominican Republic	5	1	4	6	3	14	0.214	334	416	0.803	

Source: FIVB

14 August 2004; 09:00	Cuba	2–3	Germany	Peace and Friendship Stadium; Referees: Hiroyuki Ito (JPN), Abdullah Al Khelaifi (KSA)
14 August 2004; 09:00	(25–20, 26–24, 22–25, 15–25, 15–17) result			Peace and Friendship Stadium; Referees: Hiroyuki Ito (JPN), Abdullah Al Khelaifi (KSA)

16 August 2004; 22:05	Russia	2–3	Cuba	Peace and Friendship Stadium; Referees: Kim Kun Tae (KOR), Valdir Dellaqua (BRA)
16 August 2004; 22:05	(24–26, 25–19, 27–25, 19–25, 13–16) result			Peace and Friendship Stadium; Referees: Kim Kun Tae (KOR), Valdir Dellaqua (BRA)

18 August 2004; 14:00	Cuba	3–2	China	Peace and Friendship Stadium; Referees: Patrick Rachard (FRA), Umit Sokullu (TUR)
18 August 2004; 14:00	(25–19, 22–25, 15–25, 25–21, 15–13) result			Peace and Friendship Stadium; Referees: Patrick Rachard (FRA), Umit Sokullu (TUR)

20 August 2004; 11:00	Dominican Republic	0–3	Cuba	Peace and Friendship Stadium; Referees: Karin Zahorcova (CZE), Georgios Karampetsos (GRE)
20 August 2004; 11:00	(23–25, 17–25, 23–25) result			Peace and Friendship Stadium; Referees: Karin Zahorcova (CZE), Georgios Karampetsos (GRE)

22 August 2004; 21:30	Cuba	0–3	United States	Peace and Friendship Stadium; Referees: Luciano Gaspari (ITA), Ryszard Dietrich (POL)
22 August 2004; 21:30	(22–25, 12–25, 19–25) result			Peace and Friendship Stadium; Referees: Luciano Gaspari (ITA), Ryszard Dietrich (POL)

Quarterfinals

24 August 2004; 19:30	Italy	2–3	Cuba	Peace and Friendship Stadium; Referees: Juan Angel Pereyra (ARG), Mahmoud Abdel Magid (EGY)
24 August 2004; 19:30	(23–25, 25–14, 25–22, 14–25, 12–15) result			Peace and Friendship Stadium; Referees: Juan Angel Pereyra (ARG), Mahmoud Abdel Magid (EGY)

Semifinals

26 August 2004; 22:15	Cuba	2–3	China	Peace and Friendship Stadium; Attendance: 5,120; Referees: Luciano Gaspari (ITA), Dejan Jovanovic (SCG)
26 August 2004; 22:15	(22–25, 20–25, 25–17, 25–23, 10–15) result			Peace and Friendship Stadium; Attendance: 5,120; Referees: Luciano Gaspari (ITA), Dejan Jovanovic (SCG)

Bronze Medal Final

28 August 2004; 18:00	Brazil	1–3	Cuba	Peace and Friendship Stadium; Referees: Jarmo Salonen (FIN), Ryszard Dietrich (POL)
28 August 2004; 18:00	(22–25, 22–25, 25–14, 17–25) result			Peace and Friendship Stadium; Referees: Jarmo Salonen (FIN), Ryszard Dietrich (POL)

Won Bronze Medal

== Weightlifting ==
Two Cuban weightlifters qualified for the following events:

Athlete	Event	Snatch		Clean & Jerk		Total	Rank
Athlete	Event	Result	Rank	Result	Rank	Total	Rank
Yoandry Hernández	Men's −94 kg	167.5	=14	207.5	=10	375	12
Michel Batista	Men's −105 kg	182.5	=12	212.5	12	395	11

== Wrestling ==
Key:

- VT - Victory by Fall.
- PP - Decision by Points - the loser with technical points.
- PO - Decision by Points - the loser without technical points.

Men's freestyle

Athlete	Event	Elimination Pool			Quarterfinal	Semifinal	Final / BM	
Athlete	Event	Opposition Result	Opposition Result	Rank	Opposition Result	Opposition Result	Opposition Result	Rank
René Montero	−55 kg	Tulbea (MDA); W 3–0 ^{PO}	Abas (USA); L 1–3 ^{PP}	2	Did not advance			13
Yandro Quintana	−60 kg	Djorev (BUL); W 3–0 ^{PO}	Kumar (IND); W 3–0 ^{PO}	1 Q	Pogosian (GEO); W 3–0 ^{PO}	Fedoryshyn (UKR); W 3–1 ^{PP}	Mostafa-Jokar (IRI); W 3–0 ^{PO}	1st place, gold medalist(s)
Serguei Rondón	−66 kg	Tedeyev (UKR); L 1–3 ^{PP}	Tushishvili (GEO); W 4–0 ^{ST}	2	Did not advance			9
Iván Fundora	−74 kg	Maan (IND); W 3–0 ^{PO}	Obata (JPN); W 3–0 ^{PO}	1 Q	Igali (CAN); W 3–1 ^{PP}	Laliyev (KAZ); L 1–3 ^{PP}	Brzozowski (POL); W 3–1 ^{PP}	3rd place, bronze medalist(s)
Yoel Romero	−84 kg	Cobb (GUM); W 4–0 ^{ST}	Bichinashvili (GER); W 3–0 ^{PO}	1 Q	Loizidis (GRE); W 3–1 ^{PP}	Sanderson (USA); L 1–3 ^{PP}	Sazhidov (RUS); L 1–3 ^{PP}	4
Alexis Rodríguez	−120 kg	Batzelas (GRE); W 4–0 ^{ST}	Priadun (UKR); W 3–0 ^{PO}	1 Q	Polatçı (TUR); L 1–3 ^{PP}	Did not advance	Kuramagomedov (RUS); W 5–0 ^{VB}	5

Men's Greco-Roman

Athlete	Event	Elimination Pool				Quarterfinal	Semifinal	Final / BM	
Athlete	Event	Opposition Result	Opposition Result	Opposition Result	Rank	Opposition Result	Opposition Result	Opposition Result	Rank
Lázaro Rivas	−55 kg	Benchenaf (ALG); W 4–0 ^{ST}	Rangraz (IRI); W 3–1 ^{PP}	—N/a	1 Q	Majoros (HUN); L 1–3 ^{PP}	Did not advance	Chochua (GEO); W 4–0 ^{ST}	5
Roberto Monzón	−60 kg	Ashkani (IRI); W 3–1 ^{PP}	Gikas (GRE); W 3–0 ^{PO}	Tüfenk (TUR); W 3–0 ^{PO}	1 Q	Bye	Shevtsov (RUS); W 3–1 ^{PP}	Jung J-H (KOR); L 0–3 ^{PO}	2nd place, silver medalist(s)
Juan Marén	−66 kg	Mansurov (AZE); L 0–3 ^{PO}	Wolny (POL); W 3–0 ^{PO}	—N/a	2	Did not advance			13
Filiberto Azcuy	−74 kg	Choi D-H (KOR); W 3–1 ^{PP}	Truszkowski (POL); W 3–0 ^{PO}	—N/a	1 Q	Yli-Hannuksela (FIN); L 1–3 ^{PP}	Did not advance	Khalimov (KAZ); L 0–5 ^{VB}	6
Ernesto Peña	−96 kg	Lowney (USA); W 3–1 ^{PP}	Virág (HUN); W 3–1 ^{PP}	—N/a	1 Q	Özal (TUR); L 1–3 ^{PP}	Did not advance	Chkhaidze (KGZ); W 3–0 ^{PO}	5
Mijaín López	−120 kg	Evseitchik (ISR); W 3–0 ^{PO}	Gül (TUR); W 3–0 ^{PO}	—N/a	1 Q	Baroyev (RUS); L 0–3 ^{PO}	Did not advance	Szczepaniak (FRA); W 5–0 ^{VB}	5

== See also ==
- Cuba at the 2003 Pan American Games
- Cuba at the 2004 Summer Paralympics
