= Iran at the 2004 Summer Olympics =

- IOC code: IRI
- NOC: National Olympic Committee of the Islamic Republic of Iran
- Website: www.olympic.ir (in Persian and English)

in Athens, Greece
- Competitors: 38 in 10 sports
- Flag bearer: Arash Miresmaeili
- Medals Ranked 29th: Gold 2 Silver 2 Bronze 2 Total 6

Summer Olympics appearances (overview)
- 1900; 1904–1936; 1948; 1952; 1956; 1960; 1964; 1968; 1972; 1976; 1980–1984; 1988; 1992; 1996; 2000; 2004; 2008; 2012; 2016; 2020; 2024; 2028

Iran competed at the 2004 Summer Olympics in Athens, Greece, from 13 to 29 August 2004. The nation has competed at every Summer Olympic games, since its return in 1948 after having made their debut in 1900, with the exception of the 1980 and 1984 Summer Olympics. The National Olympic Committee of the Islamic Republic of Iran sent a total of 38 athletes, 37 men and 1 woman, to compete in 10 sports. Half-lightweight judoka Arash Miresmaeili, who later forfeited his first match against Israel's Ehud Vaks for medical reasons, was the nation's flag bearer in the opening ceremony.

Iran left Athens with a total of six medals (two golds, two silver, and two bronze), finishing twenty-ninth in the overall medal standings. Half of these medals were awarded to the athletes in men's freestyle wrestling. Taekwondo jin Hadi Saei claimed his first ever Olympic title in the men's featherweight division, in addition to his bronze medal from Sydney.

== Medalists ==
Medal	Name	Sport	Event	Date
Gold	Hossein Rezazadeh	Weightlifting	Men's +105 kg	August 25
Gold	Hadi Saei	Taekwondo	Men's 68 kg	August 26
Silver	Alireza Rezaei	Wrestling	Men's freestyle 120 kg	August 28
Silver	Masoud Mostafa-Jokar	Wrestling	Men's freestyle 60 kg	August 29
Bronze	Yousef Karami	Taekwondo	Men's 80 kg	August 27
Bronze	Alireza Heidari	Wrestling	Men's freestyle 96 kg	August 29

Medals by sport
Sport	1st place, gold medalist(s)	2nd place, silver medalist(s)	3rd place, bronze medalist(s)	Total
Taekwondo	1	0	1	2
Weightlifting	1	0	0	1
Wrestling	0	2	1	3
Total	2	2	2	6

== Competitors ==
Sport	Men	Women	Total
Athletics	2	0	2
Boxing	1	0	1
Cycling	4	0	4
Judo	7	0	7
Shooting	0	1	1
Swimming	1	0	1
Table tennis	1	0	1
Taekwondo	2	0	2
Weightlifting	6	0	6
Wrestling	13	0	13
Total	37	1	38

== Athletics ==
Iranian athletes have so far achieved qualifying standards in the following athletics events (up to a maximum of 3 athletes in each event at the 'A' Standard, and 1 at the 'B' Standard).

Key

- Note–Ranks given for track events are within the athlete's heat only
- Q = Qualified for the next round
- q = Qualified for the next round as a fastest loser or, in field events, by position without achieving the qualifying target
- NR = National record
- N/A = Round not applicable for the event
- Bye = Athlete not required to compete in round

Men
Track & road events

Athlete	Event	Heat		Semifinal		Final	
Athlete	Event	Result	Rank	Result	Rank	Result	Rank
Sajjad Moradi	800 m	1:49.49	7	Did not advance			

Field events

Athlete	Event	Qualification		Final	
Athlete	Event	Distance	Position	Distance	Position
Abbas Samimi	Discus throw	57.57	28	Did not advance	

== Boxing ==
Iran has qualified one boxer.

Athlete	Event	Round of 32	Round of 16	Quarterfinals	Semifinals	Final	
Athlete	Event	Opposition Result	Opposition Result	Opposition Result	Opposition Result	Opposition Result	Rank
Mohammad Asheri	Lightweight	Bye	Valentino (ITA); L 18–37	Did not advance			

== Cycling ==
=== Road ===
Athlete	Event	Time	Rank
Abbas Saeidi Tanha	Men's road race	Did not finish	
Amir Zargari	Men's road race	Did not finish	

=== Track ===
Pursuit

Athlete	Event	Qualification		Semifinals		Final	
Athlete	Event	Time	Rank	Opponent Results	Rank	Opponent Results	Rank
Hossein Askari	Men's individual pursuit	4:39.302	15	Did not advance			

Omnium

Athlete	Event	Points	Laps	Rank
Mehdi Sohrabi	Men's points race	Did not finish		

== Judo ==
Seven Iranian judoka qualified for the 2004 Summer Olympics. Half-lightweight judoka Arash Miresmaeili forfeited his first match against Israel's Ehud Vaks, and accepted his disqualification from the International Judo Federation because a medical condition left him much heavier to fight.

Men

Athlete	Event	Round of 32	Round of 16	Quarterfinals	Semifinals	Repechage 1	Repechage 2	Repechage 3	Final / BM	
Athlete	Event	Opposition Result	Opposition Result	Opposition Result	Opposition Result	Opposition Result	Opposition Result	Opposition Result	Opposition Result	Rank
Masoud Haji Akhondzadeh	−60 kg	Cameroun (CMR); W 0030–0001	Nazaryan (ARM); W 0010–0001	Zintiridis (GRE); W 1000–0021	Khergiani (GEO); L 0011–0122	Bye			Choi M-H (KOR); L 0000–1002	5
Arash Miresmaeili	−66 kg	Vaks (ISR); L WO	Did not advance							
Hamed Malekmohammadi	−73 kg	Jereb (SLO); W 1000–0010	Bivol (MDA); L 0000–1000	Did not advance		León (VEN); W 1010–0000	Neto (POR); L 0020–1110	Did not advance		
Reza Chahkhandagh	−81 kg	Echarte (ESP); W 1000–0000	Hontyuk (UKR); L 0002–1001	Did not advance		Belgaïd (MAR); L 0001–0013	Did not advance			
Abbas Fallah	−90 kg	Morgan (CAN); L 0111–1002	Did not advance							
Masoud Khosravinejad	−100 kg	Maksimov (RUS); L 0001–0100	Did not advance							
Mahmoud Miran	+100 kg	Brutus (HAI); W 1002–0001	Tataroğlu (TUR); W 1000–0010	Pepic (AUS); W 0110–0100	Tmenov (RUS); L 0010–1110	Bye			van der Geest (NED); L 0001–0201	5

== Shooting ==
Iran has qualified a single shooter.

Women

Athlete	Event	Qualification		Final	
Athlete	Event	Points	Rank	Points	Rank
Nasim Hassanpour	10 m air pistol	376	28	Did not advance	

== Swimming ==
Iran has selected one swimmer under the Universality rule.

Men

Athlete	Event	Heat		Semifinal		Final	
Athlete	Event	Time	Rank	Time	Rank	Time	Rank
Babak Farhoudi	100 m freestyle	56.42	61	Did not advance			

== Table tennis ==
Iran has qualified one table tennis player.

Athlete	Event	Round 1	Round 2	Round 3	Round 4	Quarterfinals	Semifinals	Final / BM	
Athlete	Event	Opposition Result	Opposition Result	Opposition Result	Opposition Result	Opposition Result	Opposition Result	Opposition Result	Rank
Mohammad Reza Akhlaghpasand	Men's singles	Monteiro (BRA); L 1–4	Did not advance						

== Taekwondo ==
Two Iranian taekwondo jin qualified for the 2004 Summer Olympics.

Athlete	Event	Round of 16	Quarterfinals	Semifinals	Repechage 1	Repechage 2	Final / BM	
Athlete	Event	Opposition Result	Opposition Result	Opposition Result	Opposition Result	Opposition Result	Opposition Result	Rank
Hadi Saei	Men's −68 kg	Molfetta (ITA); W RSC	Silva (BRA); W 8–6	Song M-S (KOR); W 9–9 SUP	Bye		Huang C-H (TPE); W 4–3	1st place, gold medalist(s)
Yousef Karami	Men's −80 kg	Noikoed (THA); W 16–12	Trenton (AUS); W 13–9	López (USA); L 6–7	Bye	Hamdouni (TUN); W 12–4	Ahmadov (AZE); W 9–8	3rd place, bronze medalist(s)

== Weightlifting ==
Six Iranian weightlifters qualified for the following events.

Athlete	Event	Snatch		Clean & Jerk		Total	Rank
Athlete	Event	Result	Rank	Result	Rank	Total	Rank
Mehdi Panzvan	Men's −69 kg	147.5	=4	~~172.5~~	DNF	147.5	DNF
Mohammad Hossein Barkhah	Men's −77 kg	160	=5	197.5	6	357.5	5
Asghar Ebrahimi	Men's −94 kg	165	=16	190	16	355	16
Shahin Nassirinia	Men's −94 kg	172.5	11	220	=1	392.5	4
Mohsen Beiranvand	Men's −105 kg	~~180~~	DNF	—	—	—	DNF
Hossein Rezazadeh	Men's +105 kg	210	1	263.5 WR	1	472.5	1st place, gold medalist(s)

== Wrestling ==
Key

- VT - Victory by Fall.
- PP - Decision by Points - the loser with technical points.
- PO - Decision by Points - the loser without technical points.

Men's freestyle

Athlete	Event	Elimination Pool				Quarterfinal	Semifinal	Final / BM	
Athlete	Event	Opposition Result	Opposition Result	Opposition Result	Rank	Opposition Result	Opposition Result	Opposition Result	Rank
Babak Nourzad	−55 kg	Naranbaatar (MGL); L 0–3 ^{PO}	Kim H-S (KOR); W 3–1 ^{PP}	—N/a	3	Did not advance			16
Masoud Mostafa-Jokar	−60 kg	Prizreni (ALB); W 3–0 ^{PO}	Aslanasvili (GRE); W 3–1 ^{PP}	—N/a	1 Q	Bye	Inoue (JPN); W 3–1 ^{PP}	Quintana (CUB); L 0–3 ^{PO}	2nd place, silver medalist(s)
Alireza Dabir	−66 kg	Murtazaliev (RUS); L 0–3 ^{PO}	Tavkazakhov (UZB); L 1–3 ^{PP}	—N/a	3	Did not advance			18
Mehdi Hajizadeh	−74 kg	Saghirashvili (GEO); W 3–1 ^{PP}	Williams (USA); L 0–3 ^{PO}	—N/a	2	Did not advance			13
Majid Khodaei	−84 kg	Kumar (IND); W 3–1 ^{PP}	Yokoyama (JPN); W 3–1 ^{PP}	—N/a	1 Q	Sanderson (USA); L 1–3 ^{PP}	Did not advance	Loizidis (GRE); W 3–0 ^{PO}	5
Alireza Heidari	−96 kg	Kurtanidze (GEO); W 3–1 ^{PP}	Jaoude (BRA); W 4–0 ^{ST}	—N/a	1 Q	Aghayev (AZE); W 3–0 ^{PO}	Ibragimov (UZB); L 1–3 ^{PP}	Cormier (USA); W 3–1 ^{PP}	3rd place, bronze medalist(s)
Alireza Rezaei	−120 kg	Boyadzhiev (BUL); W 3–0 ^{PO}	Ösökhbayar (MGL); W 3–0 ^{PO}	Hrynkevich (BLR); W 3–0 ^{PO}	1 Q	Bye	Mutalimov (KAZ); W 3–1 ^{PP}	Taymazov (UZB); L 0–5 ^{VT}	2nd place, silver medalist(s)

Men's Greco-Roman

Athlete	Event	Elimination Pool				Quarterfinal	Semifinal	Final / BM	
Athlete	Event	Opposition Result	Opposition Result	Opposition Result	Rank	Opposition Result	Opposition Result	Opposition Result	Rank
Hassan Rangraz	−55 kg	Rivas (CUB); L 1–3 ^{PP}	Benchenaf (ALG); W 4–0 ^{ST}	—N/a	2	Did not advance			9
Ali Ashkani	−60 kg	Monzón (CUB); L 1–3 ^{PP}	Tüfenk (TUR); L 1–3 ^{PP}	Gikas (GRE); W 3–1 ^{PP}	3	Did not advance			11
Parviz Zeidvand	−66 kg	Begaliev (KGZ); W 3–0 ^{PO}	Sánchez (ESP); W 3–1 ^{PP}	—N/a	1 Q	Mansurov (AZE); L 1–3 ^{PP}	Did not advance	Kim I-S (KOR); L 0–5 ^{EV}	DSQ
Behrouz Jamshidi	−84 kg	Avramis (GRE); L 1–3 ^{PP}	Aanes (NOR); W 3–0 ^{PO}	—N/a	2	Did not advance			9
Masoud Hashemzadeh	−96 kg	Sudureac (ROM); W 3–1 ^{PP}	Ežerskis (LTU); W 5–0 ^{VT}	—N/a	1 Q	Chkhaidze (KGZ); W 3–1 ^{PP}	Nozadze (GEO); L 1–3 ^{PP}	Özal (TUR); L 1–3 ^{PP}	DSQ*
Sajjad Barzi	−120 kg	Deák-Bárdos (HUN); W 3–1 ^{PP}	Ahokas (FIN); W 3–1 ^{PP}	—N/a	1 Q	Szczepaniak (FRA); W 3–0 ^{PO}	Baroyev (RUS); L 0–3 ^{PO}	Gardner (USA); L 0–3 ^{PO}	4

* Masoud Hashemzadeh was disqualified for protesting after the bronze medal match.

== See also ==
- Iran at the 2002 Asian Games
- Iran at the 2004 Summer Paralympics
