= 2003 World Wrestling Championships – Men's freestyle 60 kg =

Men's freestyle 60 kg at the 2003 World Championships
- Venue: Madison Square Garden
- Dates: 12–14 September 2003
- Competitors: 40 from 40 nations

Medalists
gold medal	Arif Abdullayev	Azerbaijan
silver medal	Yandro Quintana	Cuba
bronze medal	Song Jae-myung	South Korea

The men's freestyle 60 kilograms is a competition featured at the 2003 World Wrestling Championships, and was held at the Madison Square Garden in New York, United States from 12 to 14 September 2003.

== Results ==
Legend

- WO — Won by walkover

=== Preliminary round ===
==== Pool 1 ====
Pos	Athlete	Pld	W	L	CP	TP	UZB	MDA	ISR
1	Damir Zakhartdinov (UZB)	2	2	0	7	23	—	8–2	15–0 Fall
2	Ilie Esir (MDA)	2	1	1	5	13	1–3 PP	—	11–0
3	Youri Razamat (ISR)	2	0	2	0	0	0–4 TO	0–4 ST	—

Source: Official website

==== Pool 2 ====
Pos	Athlete	Pld	W	L	CP	TP	USA	ITA	IRI
1	Eric Guerrero (USA)	2	2	0	6	7	—	4–3	3–1
2	Michele Liuzzi (ITA)	2	1	1	5	3	1–3 PP	—	WO
3	Mohammad Talaei (IRI)	2	0	2	1	1	1–3 PP	0–4 PA	—

Source: Official website

==== Pool 3 ====
Pos	Athlete	Pld	W	L	CP	TP	AUT	SUI	FRA
1	Lubos Cikel (AUT)	2	2	0	6	10	—	3–0	7–1
2	Ricky Hafner (SUI)	2	1	1	3	3	0–3 PO	—	3–3
3	Rachid Ben Ali (FRA)	2	0	2	2	4	1–3 PP	1–3 PP	—

Source: Official website

==== Pool 4 ====
Pos	Athlete	Pld	W	L	CP	TP	AZE	ALB	HUN
1	Arif Abdullayev (AZE)	2	1	1	4	8	—	7–2	1–5
2	Sahit Prizreni (ALB)	2	1	1	4	5	1–3 PP	—	3–1
3	Gergõ Wöller (HUN)	2	1	1	4	6	3–1 PP	1–3 PP	—

Source: Official website

==== Pool 5 ====
Pos	Athlete	Pld	W	L	CP	TP	RUS	PUR	AUS
1	Kamal Ustarkhanov (RUS)	2	2	0	7	13	—	3–0 Fall	10–2
2	Franklin Lantigua (PUR)	2	1	1	3	3	0–4 TO	—	3–1
3	Gentian Balashi (AUS)	2	0	2	2	3	1–3 PP	1–3 PP	—

Source: Official website

==== Pool 6 ====
Pos	Athlete	Pld	W	L	CP	TP	IND	ARM	BLR
1	Sushil Kumar (IND)	2	2	0	8	14	—	12–0	2–2 Fall
2	Aram Margaryan (ARM)	2	1	1	3	3	0–4 ST	—	3–2
3	Aliaksandr Karnitski (BLR)	2	0	2	1	4	0–4 TO	1–3 PP	—

Source: Official website

==== Pool 7 ====
Pos	Athlete	Pld	W	L	CP	TP	CAN	POL	NZL
1	Guivi Sissaouri (CAN)	2	2	0	7	20	—	8–0	12–0 Fall
2	Michał Małkiewicz (POL)	2	1	1	4	11	0–3 PO	—	11–0
3	Martin Liddle (NZL)	2	0	2	0	0	0–4 TO	0–4 ST	—

Source: Official website

==== Pool 8 ====
Pos	Athlete	Pld	W	L	CP	TP	GEO	SVK	ROM
1	David Pogosian (GEO)	2	2	0	6	12	—	5–0	7–2
2	Andrej Fašánek (SVK)	2	1	1	3	6	0–3 PO	—	6–4
3	Petru Toarcă (ROM)	2	0	2	2	6	1–3 PP	1–3 PP	—

Source: Official website

==== Pool 9 ====
Pos	Athlete	Pld	W	L	CP	TP	MGL	JPN	TPE
1	Oyuunbilegiin Pürevbaatar (MGL)	2	2	0	7	14	—	4–1	10–0
2	Ryosuke Ota (JPN)	2	1	1	5	13	1–3 PP	—	12–0
3	Lin Chien-liang (TPE)	2	0	2	0	0	0–4 ST	0–4 ST	—

Source: Official website

==== Pool 10 ====
Pos	Athlete	Pld	W	L	CP	TP	TUR	GER	PER
1	Tevfik Odabaşı (TUR)	2	2	0	7	13	—	3–0	10–0
2	Mario Koch (GER)	2	1	1	4	14	0–3 PO	—	14–4
3	José Paico (PER)	2	0	2	1	4	0–4 ST	1–4 SP	—

Source: Official website

==== Pool 11 ====
Pos	Athlete	Pld	W	L	CP	TP	CUB	UKR	BUL
1	Yandro Quintana (CUB)	2	2	0	7	16	—	5–2	11–0
2	Vasyl Fedoryshyn (UKR)	2	1	1	4	5	1–3 PP	—	3–0
3	Anatolie Guidea (BUL)	2	0	2	0	0	0–4 ST	0–3 PO	—

Source: Official website

==== Pool 12 ====
Pos	Athlete	Pld	W	L	CP	TP	KGZ	KAZ	EST
1	Ulan Nadyrbek Uulu (KGZ)	2	2	0	7	17	—	13–3	4–1
2	Iossif Momtselidze (KAZ)	2	1	1	4	9	1–4 SP	—	6–1
3	Jaanek Lips (EST)	2	0	2	2	2	1–3 PP	1–3 PP	—

Source: Official website

==== Pool 13 ====
Pos	Athlete	Pld	W	L	CP	TP	KOR	CHN	GRE	NED
1	Song Jae-myung (KOR)	3	2	1	8	11	—	9–7	1–3	1–0 Ret
2	Zhou Xiande (CHN)	3	2	1	7	17	1–3 PP	—	3–2	7–0
3	Besik Aslanasvili (GRE)	3	2	1	7	13	3–1 PP	1–3 PP	—	8–0
4	Alex Davitashvili (NED)	3	0	3	0	0	0–4 PA	0–3 PO	0–3 PO	—

Source: Official website

=== Knockout round ===
Round of 16
Damir Zakhartdinov (UZB)	5
Eric Guerrero (USA)	3
Lubos Cikel (AUT)	11
Arif Abdullayev (AZE)	15
Kamal Ustarkhanov (RUS)	0
Sushil Kumar (IND)	6
Guivi Sissaouri (CAN)	0
David Pogosian (GEO)	4
Oyuunbilegiin Pürevbaatar (MGL)	0
Tevfik Odabaşı (TUR)	10

Quarterfinals
Damir Zakhartdinov (UZB)
Arif Abdullayev (AZE)	WO
Sushil Kumar (IND)	6
David Pogosian (GEO)	3
Tevfik Odabaşı (TUR)	1
Yandro Quintana (CUB)	12
Ulan Nadyrbek Uulu (KGZ)	1
Song Jae-myung (KOR)	3

Semifinals
Arif Abdullayev (AZE)	9
Sushil Kumar (IND)	8
Yandro Quintana (CUB)	5
Song Jae-myung (KOR)	2

Final
Arif Abdullayev (AZE)	4
Yandro Quintana (CUB)	3
Bronze medal match
Sushil Kumar (IND)	1
Song Jae-myung (KOR)	3
