= Uzbekistan at the 2004 Summer Olympics =

- IOC code: UZB
- NOC: National Olympic Committee of the Republic of Uzbekistan
- Website: www.olympic.uz (in Uzbek and English)

in Athens
- Competitors: 70 in 13 sports
- Flag bearer: Abdullo Tangriev
- Medals Ranked 34th: Gold 2 Silver 1 Bronze 2 Total 5

Summer Olympics appearances (overview)
- 1996; 2000; 2004; 2008; 2012; 2016; 2020; 2024; 2028

Other related appearances
- Russian Empire (1900–1912); Soviet Union (1952–1988); Unified Team (1992)

Uzbekistan competed at the 2004 Summer Olympics in Athens, Greece, from 13 to 29 August 2004. This was the nation's third consecutive appearance at the Olympics. The National Olympic Committee of the Republic of Uzbekistan sent a total of 70 athletes to the Games, 52 men and 18 women, to compete in 13 different sports, tying its delegation record with Sydney four years earlier. There was only a single competitor in road cycling, artistic and trampoline gymnastics, and table tennis.

Seventeen athletes from the Uzbek team had previously competed in Sydney, including artistic gymnast and three-time Olympic medalist Oksana Chusovitina (who transferred to Germany in 2002 to treat her ailing son Alisher from leukemia), freestyle wrestler Artur Taymazov, who won silver in men's super heavyweight, sprint freestyle swimmer and Asian Games champion Ravil Nachaev, trampoline gymnast Ekaterina Khilko, and heavyweight judoka Abdullo Tangriev, who later became the nation's flag bearer in the opening ceremony. At age 15, backstroke swimmer Olga Gnedovskaya set a historical milestone for Uzbekistan as the youngest ever athlete in history to compete at the Olympics. Other notable Uzbek athletes featured road cyclist and world junior champion Sergey Lagutin, canoeist Anton Ryahov, who later competed for the Russian at his subsequent Olympics, and swimming siblings Danil Bugakov and Mariya Bugakova.

Uzbekistan left Athens with a total of five medals, two golds, one silver, and two bronze, being considered its most successful Olympics in history since the post-Soviet era. Three of these medals were awarded to the athletes in wrestling, including a prestigious gold from Taymazov in men's super heavyweight freestyle. Meanwhile, boxers Bahodirjon Sultonov and Utkirbek Haydarov managed to claim bronze medals in their respective weight classes.

== Medalists ==
Medal	Name	Sport	Event	Date
Gold	Artur Taymazov	Wrestling	Men's freestyle 120 kg	August 28
Gold	Aleksandr Dokturishvili	Wrestling	Men's Greco-Roman 74 kg	August 26
Silver	Magomed Ibragimov	Wrestling	Men's freestyle 96 kg	August 29
Bronze	Bahodirjon Sultonov	Boxing	Bantamweight	August 29
Bronze	Utkirbek Haydarov	Boxing	Light heavyweight	August 29

== Athletics ==
Uzbek athletes have so far achieved qualifying standards in the following athletics events (up to a maximum of 3 athletes in each event at the 'A' Standard, and 1 at the 'B' Standard). Shot putter Olga Shchukina was disqualified from the competition after being tested positive for clenbuterol.

Key

- Note–Ranks given for track events are within the athlete's heat only
- Q = Qualified for the next round
- q = Qualified for the next round as a fastest loser or, in field events, by position without achieving the qualifying target
- NR = National record
- N/A = Round not applicable for the event
- Bye = Athlete not required to compete in round

Men
Track & road events

Athlete	Event	Heat		Semifinal		Final	
Athlete	Event	Result	Rank	Result	Rank	Result	Rank
Erkinjon Isakov	800 m	1:48.28	8	Did not advance			

Field events

Athlete	Event	Qualification		Final	
Athlete	Event	Distance	Position	Distance	Position
Leonid Andreev	Pole vault	DNS		Did not advance	
Sergey Voynov	Javelin throw	74.68	24	Did not advance	

Combined events – Decathlon

Athlete	Event	100 m	LJ	SP	HJ	400 m	110H	DT	PV	JT	1500 m	Final	Rank
Pavel Andreyev	Result	11.29	NM	14.30	2.00	51.46	15.54	41.89	4.90	DNS	—	DNF	
Pavel Andreyev	Points	797	0	747	803	741	785	703	880	0	—	DNF	
Vitaliy Smirnov	Result	10.89	7.07	13.88	1.94	49.11	14.77	42.47	4.70	60.88	4:23.31	7993	17
Vitaliy Smirnov	Points	885	830	721	749	856	978	715	819	751	789	7993	17

Women
Track & road events

Athlete	Event	Heat		Quarterfinal		Semifinal		Final	
Athlete	Event	Result	Rank	Result	Rank	Result	Rank	Result	Rank
Zamira Amirova	400 m	54.43	7	—N/a		Did not advance			
Guzel Khubbieva	100 m	11.31	4 q	11.35	6	Did not advance			
Lyubov Perepelova	100 m	11.30	3 Q	11.26	4 q	11.40	8	Did not advance	
Lyubov Perepelova	200 m	24.10	5	Did not advance					

Field events

Athlete	Event	Qualification		Final	
Athlete	Event	Distance	Position	Distance	Position
Liliya Dusmetova	Javelin throw	52.46	38	Did not advance	
Anastasiya Juravleva	Long jump	6.39	27	Did not advance	
Anastasiya Juravleva	Triple jump	13.64	27	Did not advance	
Olga Shchukina	Shot put	~~14.44~~	DSQ	Did not advance	

== Boxing ==
Uzbekistan sent nine boxers to Athens. All nine made it past the round of 32, with five victories and four byes. Four of the boxers fell in the round of 16 (two of which had not had matches in the round of 32). Three more barely missed medalling by being defeated in the quarterfinals, while the two that had won their quarterfinal bouts both lost in the semifinals to earn bronze medals.

Athlete	Event	Round of 32	Round of 16	Quarterfinals	Semifinals	Final	
Athlete	Event	Opposition Result	Opposition Result	Opposition Result	Opposition Result	Opposition Result	Rank
Tulashboy Doniyorov	Flyweight	Payla (PHI); W 36–26	Siler (USA); W 45–22	Thomas (FRA); L 16–25	Did not advance		
Bahodirjon Sultonov	Bantamweight	Bye	Liczik (POL); W RSC	Kooner (CAN); W 44–32	Rigondeaux (CUB); L 13–27	Did not advance	3rd place, bronze medalist(s)
Bekzod Khidirov	Featherweight	Sohail (PAK); W RSC	Jafarov (KAZ); L 22–40	Did not advance			
Dilshod Mahmudov	Light welterweight	Bye	Matos (BRA); W 26–16	Johnson (CUB); L 28–32	Did not advance		
Sherzod Husanov	Welterweight	Prada (VEN); W 33–20	Ulusoy (TUR); W 23–9	Saitov (RUS); L 14–22	Did not advance		
Sherzod Abdurahmonov	Middleweight	Ustuner (TUR); W 34–16	Gaydarbekov (RUS); L 19–33	Did not advance			
Utkirbek Haydarov	Light heavyweight	Ekpo (NGR); W 21–11	Kensi (ALG); W 31–19	Tarhan (TUR); W 16–11	Ward (USA); L 15–17	Did not advance	3rd place, bronze medalist(s)
Igor Alborov	Heavyweight	—N/a	Elsayed (EGY); L 18–18^{+}	Did not advance			
Rustam Saidov	Super heavyweight	—N/a	López (CUB); L 13–18	Did not advance			

== Canoeing ==
=== Sprint ===
Men

Athlete	Event	Heats		Semifinals		Final	
Athlete	Event	Time	Rank	Time	Rank	Time	Rank
Anton Ryahov	K-1 500 m	1:42.253	6 q	1:40.737	5	Did not advance	
Danila Turchin	K-1 1000 m	3:48.140	8	Did not advance			
Aleksey Babadjanov; Sergey Borzov	K-2 500 m	1:34.782	7 q	1:33.654	6	Did not advance	
Michail Tarasov; Danila Turchin	K-2 1000 m	3:24.031	8	Did not advance			
Aleksey Babadjanov; Sergey Borzov; Anton Ryahov; Dmitriy Strijkov	K-4 1000 m	3:01.446	5 q	2:56.594	4	Did not advance	

Women

Athlete	Event	Heats		Semifinals		Final	
Athlete	Event	Time	Rank	Time	Rank	Time	Rank
Yuliya Borzova	K-1 500 m	1:56.586	6 q	1:59.560	6	Did not advance	

Qualification Legend: Q = Qualify to final; q = Qualify to semifinal

== Cycling ==
=== Road ===
Athlete	Event	Time	Rank
Sergey Lagutin	Men's road race	5:50:35	59

== Gymnastics ==
=== Artistic ===
Women

Athlete	Event	Qualification						Final					
Athlete	Event	Apparatus				Total	Rank	Apparatus				Total	Rank
Athlete	Event	V	UB	BB	F	Total	Rank	V	UB	BB	F	Total	Rank
Oksana Chusovitina	Vault	8.675	—N/a			8.675	81	Did not advance					

=== Trampoline ===
Athlete	Event	Qualification		Final	
Athlete	Event	Score	Rank	Score	Rank
Ekaterina Khilko	Women's	61.60	11	Did not advance	

== Judo ==
Six Uzbek judoka qualified for the 2004 Summer Olympics.

Men

Athlete	Event	Round of 32	Round of 16	Quarterfinals	Semifinals	Repechage 1	Repechage 2	Repechage 3	Final / BM	
Athlete	Event	Opposition Result	Opposition Result	Opposition Result	Opposition Result	Opposition Result	Opposition Result	Opposition Result	Opposition Result	Rank
Sanjar Zokirov	−60 kg	Zintiridis (GRE); L 0000–1011	Did not advance							
Murat Kalikulov	−66 kg	Mijalković (SCG); L 0100–0101	Did not advance							
Egamnazar Akbarov	−73 kg	Etoga (CMR); L 0000–0011	Did not advance							
Ramziddin Sayidov	−81 kg	Shundzikau (BLR); L 0011–1111	Did not advance							
Vyacheslav Pereteyko	−90 kg	Iliadis (GRE); L 0000–1000	Did not advance							
Abdullo Tangriev	+100 kg	Bataille (FRA); W 1120–0001	Pertelson (EST); L 0010–0021	Did not advance						

== Rowing ==
Uzbek rowers qualified the following boats:

Men

Athlete	Event	Heats		Repechage		Semifinals		Final	
Athlete	Event	Time	Rank	Time	Rank	Time	Rank	Time	Rank
Vladimir Tchernenko	Single sculls	7:38.27	3 R	7:13.43	3 SD/E	7:13.21	3 FD	7:23.56	24
Sergey Bogdanov; Ruslan Naurzaliev	Lightweight double sculls	6:52.34	5 R	6:45.69	4 SC/D	6:45.47	5	Did not advance	

Women

Athlete	Event	Heats		Repechage		Semifinals		Final	
Athlete	Event	Time	Rank	Time	Rank	Time	Rank	Time	Rank
Elena Usarova	Single sculls	8:32.56	6 R	8:06.11	5 SC/D	8:34.04	6 FC	8:09.92	23

Qualification Legend: FA=Final A (medal); FB=Final B (non-medal); FC=Final C (non-medal); FD=Final D (non-medal); FE=Final E (non-medal); FF=Final F (non-medal); SA/B=Semifinals A/B; SC/D=Semifinals C/D; SE/F=Semifinals E/F; R=Repechage

== Shooting ==
Two Uzbek shooters (one man and one woman) qualified to compete in the following events:

Men

Athlete	Event	Qualification		Final	
Athlete	Event	Points	Rank	Points	Rank
Vyacheslav Skoromnov	10 m air rifle	592	=18	Did not advance	
Vyacheslav Skoromnov	50 m rifle prone	591	=24	Did not advance	
Vyacheslav Skoromnov	50 m rifle 3 positions	1161	=12	Did not advance	

Women

Athlete	Event	Qualification		Final	
Athlete	Event	Points	Rank	Points	Rank
Alyona Aksyonova	10 m air rifle	384	40	Did not advance	
Alyona Aksyonova	50 m rifle 3 positions	562	29	Did not advance	

== Swimming ==
Uzbek swimmers earned qualifying standards in the following events (up to a maximum of 2 swimmers in each event at the A-standard time, and 1 at the B-standard time):

Men

Athlete	Event	Heat		Semifinal		Final	
Athlete	Event	Time	Rank	Time	Rank	Time	Rank
Aleksandr Agafonov	100 m freestyle	52.92	57	Did not advance			
Danil Bugakov	100 m backstroke	1:02.28	43	Did not advance			
Oleg Lyashko	100 m butterfly	55.90	47	Did not advance			
Andrey Morkovin	200 m breaststroke	2:18.48	34	Did not advance			
Ravil Nachaev	50 m freestyle	23.23	=36	Did not advance			
Sergey Pankov	200 m butterfly	2:13.06	39	Did not advance			
Nikita Polyakov	400 m individual medley	5:09.66	36	—N/a		Did not advance	
Oleg Pukhnatiy	200 m individual medley	2:08.24	42	Did not advance			
Oleg Sidorov	100 m breaststroke	1:08.30	56	Did not advance			
Sergey Tsoy	400 m freestyle	4:16.91	45	—N/a		Did not advance	
Petr Vasilev	200 m freestyle	1:56.93	57	Did not advance			

Women

Athlete	Event	Heat		Semifinal		Final	
Athlete	Event	Time	Rank	Time	Rank	Time	Rank
Mariya Bugakova	100 m butterfly	1:07.08	37	Did not advance			
Olga Gnedovskaya	100 m backstroke	1:15.33	41	Did not advance			
Saida Iskandarova	200 m backstroke	2:26.17	32	Did not advance			
Irina Shlemova	100 m freestyle	59.21	45	Did not advance			

== Table tennis ==
Uzbekistan has qualified a single table tennis player.

Athlete	Event	Round 1	Round 2	Round 3	Round 4	Quarterfinals	Semifinals	Final / BM	
Athlete	Event	Opposition Result	Opposition Result	Opposition Result	Opposition Result	Opposition Result	Opposition Result	Opposition Result	Rank
Manzura Inoyatova	Women's singles	Fazekas (HUN); L 0–4	Did not advance						

== Taekwondo ==
Two Uzbek taekwondo jin qualified for the following events.

Athlete	Event	Round of 16	Quarterfinals	Semifinals	Repechage 1	Repechage 2	Final / BM	
Athlete	Event	Opposition Result	Opposition Result	Opposition Result	Opposition Result	Opposition Result	Opposition Result	Rank
Irina Kaydashova	Women's −57 kg	Bye	Salazar (MEX); L 7–7 SUP	Did not advance				
Natalya Mikryukova	Women's +67 kg	Rase (BEL); L 6–9	Did not advance					

== Weightlifting ==
Three Uzbek weightlifters qualified for the following events:

Athlete	Event	Snatch		Clean & Jerk		Total	Rank
Athlete	Event	Result	Rank	Result	Rank	Total	Rank
Furkat Saidov	Men's −94 kg	145	21	175	18	320	18
Aleksandr Urinov	Men's −105 kg	185	=9	215	=10	400	8
Igor Khalilov	Men's +105 kg	187.5	11	232.5	8	420	9

== Wrestling ==
Key:

- VT - Victory by Fall.
- PP - Decision by Points - the loser with technical points.
- PO - Decision by Points - the loser without technical points.

Men's freestyle

Athlete	Event	Elimination Pool				Quarterfinal	Semifinal	Final / BM	
Athlete	Event	Opposition Result	Opposition Result	Opposition Result	Rank	Opposition Result	Opposition Result	Opposition Result	Rank
Dilshod Mansurov	−55 kg	Rahmati (AFG); W 4–0 ^{ST}	Batirov (RUS); L 1–3 ^{PP}	—N/a	2	Did not advance			10
Damir Zakhartdinov	−60 kg	Inoue (JPN); W 3–1 ^{PP}	Cikel (AUT); L 1–3 ^{PP}	Jung Y-H (KOR); L 0–5 ^{VT}	4	Did not advance			9
Artur Tavkazakhov	−66 kg	Murtazaliev (RUS); L 1–3 ^{PP}	Dabir (IRI); W 3–1 ^{PP}	—N/a	2	Did not advance			13
Magomed Ibragimov	−96 kg	Krupnyakov (KGZ); W 3–1 ^{PP}	Kochev (BUL); W 3–0 ^{PO}	—N/a	1 Q	Wang Yy (CHN); W 3–1 ^{PP}	Heidari (IRI); W 3–1 ^{PP}	Gatsalov (RUS); L 1–3 ^{PP}	2nd place, silver medalist(s)
Artur Taymazov	−120 kg	Garmulewicz (POL); W 5–0 ^{VT}	Cheema (IND); W 5–0 ^{VT}	—N/a	1 Q	Kuramagomedov (RUS); W 3–1 ^{PP}	Polatçı (TUR); W 3–0 ^{PO}	Rezaei (IRI); W 5–0 ^{VT}	1st place, gold medalist(s)

Men's Greco-Roman

Athlete	Event	Elimination Pool				Quarterfinal	Semifinal	Final / BM	
Athlete	Event	Opposition Result	Opposition Result	Opposition Result	Rank	Opposition Result	Opposition Result	Opposition Result	Rank
Aleksandr Dokturishvili	−74 kg	Berzicza (HUN); W 3–1 ^{PP}	Aslanov (AZE); W 3–0 ^{PO}	Kolitsopoulos (GRE); W 3–1 ^{PP}	1 Q	Bye	Samurgashev (RUS); W 3–1 ^{PP}	Yli-Hannuksela (FIN); W 3–1 ^{PP}	1st place, gold medalist(s)
Aleksey Cheglakov	−96 kg	Kostins (LAT); W 3–1 ^{PP}	Özal (TUR); L 0–3 ^{PO}	—N/a	2	Did not advance			14

== See also ==
- Uzbekistan at the 2002 Asian Games
- Uzbekistan at the 2004 Summer Paralympics
