= Boxing at the 2004 Summer Olympics – Lightweight =

Boxing competitions

Lightweight boxing at the Games of the XXVIII Olympiad
- Venue: Peristeri Olympic Boxing Hall
- Date: 16–29 August 2004
- Competitors: 28 from 28 nations

Medalists
1st place, gold medalist(s)		Mario Kindelán	Cuba
2nd place, silver medalist(s)		Amir Khan	Great Britain
3rd place, bronze medalist(s)		Serik Yeleuov	Kazakhstan
3rd place, bronze medalist(s)		Murat Khrachev	Russia

The lightweight boxing competition at the 2004 Summer Olympics in Athens was held from 16 to 29 August at Peristeri Olympic Boxing Hall. This is limited to those boxers weighing between 57 and 60 kilograms.

== Competition format ==
Like all Olympic boxing events, the competition was a straight single-elimination tournament. This event consisted of 28 boxers who have qualified for the competition through various tournaments held in 2003 and 2004. The competition began with a preliminary round on 16 August, where the number of competitors was reduced to 16, and concluded with the final on 29 August. As there were fewer than 32 boxers in the competition, a number of boxers received a bye through the preliminary round. Both semi-final losers were awarded bronze medals.

All bouts consisted of four rounds of two minutes each, with one-minute breaks between rounds. Punches scored only if the white area on the front of the glove made full contact with the front of the head or torso of the opponent. Five judges scored each bout; three of the judges had to signal a scoring punch within one second for the punch to score. The winner of the bout was the boxer who scored the most valid punches by the end of the bout.

== Schedule ==
All times are Greece Standard Time (UTC+2)

Date	Time	Round
Monday, 16 August 2004	13:30 & 19:30	Round of 32
Friday, 20 August 2004	13:30	Round of 16
Tuesday, 24 August 2004	19:30	Quarterfinals
Friday, 27 August 2004	19:30	Semifinals
Sunday, 29 August 2004	13:30	Final

== Qualifying Athletes ==
Athlete	Country
Mohammad Asheri	Iran
Domenico Valentino	Italy
Manuel Félix Díaz	Dominican Republic
Serik Yeleuov	Kazakhstan
Selçuk Aydın	Turkey
Dimitar Stilianov	Bulgaria
Marios Kaperonis	Greece
Amir Khan	Great Britain
Gyula Káté	Hungary
Baik Jong-Sub	South Korea
Uranchimegiin Mönkh-Erdene	Mongolia
Michael Medor	Mauritius
José David Mosquera	Colombia
Vicente Escobedo	United States
Rovshan Huseynov	Azerbaijan
Bongani Mahlangu	South Africa
Asghar Ali Shah	Pakistan
Volodymyr Kravets	Ukraine
Mario Kindelán	Cuba
Ahmed Sadiq	Nigeria
Sam Rukundo	Uganda
Tahar Tamsamani	Morocco
Myke Carvalho	Brazil
Alex de Jesús	Puerto Rico
Taoufik Chobba	Tunisia
Anthony Little	Australia
Jorge Bestard	Spain
Murat Khrachev	Russia

== Results ==
Round of 32
Selçuk Aydın (TUR)	11
Dimitar Stilianov (BUL)	20
Marios Kaperonis (GRE)
Amir Khan (GBR)	RSC
Gyula Káté (HUN)	23
Baik Jong-Sub (KOR)	30
Uranchimegiin Mönkh-Erdene (MGL)	29
Michael Medor (MRI)	23
José David Mosquera (COL)
Vicente Escobedo (USA)	RSC
Rovshan Huseynov (AZE)	22
Bongani Mahlangu (RSA)	14
Asghar Ali Shah (PAK)	21
Volodymyr Kravets (UKR)	19
Mario Kindelán (CUB)	RSC
Ahmed Sadiq (NGR)
Sam Rukundo (UGA)	30
Tahar Tamsamani (MAR)	22
Myke Carvalho (BRA)	24
Alex de Jesús (PUR)	39
Taoufik Chobba (TUN)	8
Anthony Little (AUS)	27
Jorge Bestard Navarro-Rubio (ESP)	29
Murat Khrachev (RUS)	40

Round of 16
Mohamed Asheri (IRI)	18
Domenico Valentino (ITA)	37
Manuel Félix Díaz (DOM)	16
Serik Yeleuov (KAZ)	28
Dimitar Stilianov (BUL)	21
Amir Khan (GBR)	37
Baik Jong-Sub (KOR)	33
Uranchimegiin Mönkh-Erdene (MGL)	22
Vicente Escobedo (USA)	18
Rovshan Huseynov (AZE)	36
Asghar Ali Shah (PAK)	9
Mario Kindelán (CUB)	24
Sam Rukundo (UGA)	24
Alex de Jesús (PUR)	22
Anthony Little (AUS)
Murat Khrachev (RUS)	RSC

Quarterfinals
Domenico Valentino (ITA)	23
Serik Yeleuov (KAZ)	29
Amir Khan (GBR)	RSC
Baik Jong-Sub (KOR)
Rovshan Huseynov (AZE)	11
Mario Kindelán (CUB)	23
Sam Rukundo (UGA)	18
Murat Khrachev (RUS)	31

Semifinals
Serik Yeleuov (KAZ)	26
Amir Khan (GBR)	40
Mario Kindelán (CUB)	20
Murat Khrachev (RUS)	10

Finals
Amir Khan (GBR)	22
Mario Kindelán (CUB)	30
