= Albania at the 2004 Summer Olympics =

- IOC code: ALB
- NOC: Albanian National Olympic Committee
- Website: nocalbania.org.al (in Albanian)

in Athens
- Competitors: 7 in 4 sports
- Flag bearer: Klodiana Shala
- Medals: Gold 0 Silver 0 Bronze 0 Total 0

Summer Olympics appearances (overview)
- 1972; 1976–1988; 1992; 1996; 2000; 2004; 2008; 2012; 2016; 2020; 2024

Albania was represented at the 2004 Summer Olympics in Athens by the National Olympic Committee of Albania.

In total, seven athletes represented Albania in four different sports including athletics, swimming, weightlifting and wrestling.

== Athletics ==
Two Albanian athletes participated in the athletics events – Dorian Çollaku competed in the men's hammer throw and Klodiana Shala competed in the women's 400 m hurdles.

Qualification for the men's hammer throw took place on 20 August 2004 at 11 am. Çollaku threw 70.06 m with his first attempt but failed to improve with his second attempt and finished 30th overall.

The heats for the women's 400 m hurdles took place the following day. Shala contested heat three which took place at 9:19 am. She finished sixth of the six starters in a time of exactly one minute and failed to advance to the semi-finals.

Men

Athlete	Event	Qualification		Final	
Athlete	Event	Distance	Position	Distance	Position
Dorian Çollaku	Hammer throw	70.06	30	did not advance	

Women

Athlete	Event	Heat		Semifinal		Final	
Athlete	Event	Result	Rank	Result	Rank	Result	Rank
Klodiana Shala	400 m hurdles	1:00.00	6	did not advance			

== Swimming ==
Two athletes represented Albania in the swimming events – Kreshnik Gjata in the men's 50 m freestyle and Rovena Marku in the women's 50 m freestyle.

The heats for the men's 50 m freestyle took place on 19 August 2004 at 8 am. Gjata contested heat three and started in lane six. He finished fifth in his heat in a time of 26.61 seconds which was ultimately not fast enough to qualify for the semi-finals.

The heats for the women's 50 m freestyle took place on 20 August 2004 at 8 am. Marku contested heat three and started in lane one. She finished sixth in her heat in a time of 30.51 seconds which was ultimately not fast enough to qualify for the semi-finals.

Men

Athlete	Event	Heat		Semifinal		Final	
Athlete	Event	Time	Rank	Time	Rank	Time	Rank
Kreshnik Gjata	50 m freestyle	26.61	=66	did not advance			

Women

Athlete	Event	Heat		Semifinal		Final	
Athlete	Event	Time	Rank	Time	Rank	Time	Rank
Rovena Marku	50 m freestyle	30.51	60	did not advance			

== Weightlifting ==
Two athletes represented Albania in the weightlifting events – Gert Trasha in the men's −62 kg and Theoharis Trasha in the men's −77 kg.

The weightlifting events took place on 16 August 2004. Gert Trasha lifted 115 kg (snatch) and 140 kg (clean and jerk) for a combined score of 255 kg which placed him 13th in the overall rankings for the men's −62 kg. Theoharis Trasha lifted 160 kg (snatch) and 182.5 kg (clean and jerk) for a combined score of 342.5 kg which placed him 13th in the overall rankings for the men's −77 kg.

Athlete	Event	Snatch (kg)		Clean & Jerk (kg)		Total (kg)	Rank
Athlete	Event	Result	Rank	Result	Rank	Total (kg)	Rank
Gert Trasha	Men's −62 kg	115	=15	140	13	255	13
Theoharis Trasha	Men's −77 kg	160	=6	182.5	=15	342.5	13

== Wrestling ==
One athletes represented Albania in the wrestling events – Sahit Prizreni in the men's freestyle −60 kg.

Matches in the elimination pools took place on 28 August 2004. Prizreni lost his first match against Besik Aslanasvili of Greece before losing his second match against Masoud Mostafa-Jokar of Iran as he finished bottom of pool 5.

Key

- VT - Victory by Fall.
- PP - Decision by Points - the loser with technical points.
- PO - Decision by Points - the loser without technical points.

Men's freestyle

Athlete	Event	Elimination Pool			Quarterfinal	Semifinal	Final / BM	
Athlete	Event	Opposition Result	Opposition Result	Rank	Opposition Result	Opposition Result	Opposition Result	Rank
Sahit Prizreni	−60 kg	Aslanasvili (GRE); L 1–3 ^{PP}	Mostafa-Jokar (IRI); L 0–3 ^{PO}	3	did not advance			17

== See also ==
- Albania at the 2005 Mediterranean Games
