= Wrestling at the 2004 Summer Olympics – Men's freestyle 60 kg =

Men's freestyle 60 kg at the Games of the XXVIII Olympiad
- Venue: Ano Liosia Olympic Hall
- Date: 28–29 August 2004
- Competitors: 19 from 19 nations

Medalists
1st place, gold medalist(s)		Yandro Quintana	Cuba
2nd place, silver medalist(s)		Masoud Mostafa-Jokar	Iran
3rd place, bronze medalist(s)		Kenji Inoue	Japan

The men's freestyle 60 kilograms at the 2004 Summer Olympics as part of the wrestling program were held at the Ano Liosia Olympic Hall, August 28 to August 29.

The competition held with an elimination system of three or four wrestlers in each pool, with the winners qualify for the quarterfinals, semifinals and final by way of direct elimination.

== Schedule ==
All times are Eastern European Summer Time (UTC+03:00)

Date	Time	Event
28 August 2004	09:30	Round 1
28 August 2004	09:30	Round 2
28 August 2004	17:30	Round 3
29 August 2004	09:30	Qualification
29 August 2004	09:30	Semifinals
29 August 2004	14:00	Finals

== Results ==
Legend

- WO — Won by walkover

=== Elimination pools ===
==== Pool 1 ====
Pos	Athlete	Pld	W	L	CP	TP	Qualification
1	Vasyl Fedoryshyn (UKR)	2	2	0	6	8	Knockout round
2	Ulan Nadyrbek Uulu (KGZ)	2	1	1	4	6	
3	Gergõ Wöller (HUN)	2	0	2	0	0	

Source: Official website

	Score		CP
Ulan Nadyrbek Uulu (KGZ)	3–0	Gergõ Wöller (HUN)	3–0 PO
Vasyl Fedoryshyn (UKR)	5–3	Ulan Nadyrbek Uulu (KGZ)	3–1 PP
Gergõ Wöller (HUN)	0–3	Vasyl Fedoryshyn (UKR)	0–3 PO

==== Pool 2 ====
Pos	Athlete	Pld	W	L	CP	TP	Qualification
1	Guivi Sissaouri (CAN)	2	2	0	6	13	Knockout round
2	Murad Umakhanov (RUS)	2	1	1	4	7	
3	Tevfik Odabaşı (TUR)	2	0	2	2	6	

Source: Official website

	Score		CP
Murad Umakhanov (RUS)	5–2	Tevfik Odabaşı (TUR)	3–1 PP
Guivi Sissaouri (CAN)	8–2	Murad Umakhanov (RUS)	3–1 PP
Tevfik Odabaşı (TUR)	4–5	Guivi Sissaouri (CAN)	1–3 PP

==== Pool 3 ====
Pos	Athlete	Pld	W	L	CP	TP	Qualification
1	Yandro Quintana (CUB)	2	2	0	6	6	Knockout round
2	Sushil Kumar (IND)	2	1	1	3	9	
3	Ivan Djorev (BUL)	2	0	2	0	0	

Source: Official website

	Score		CP
Yandro Quintana (CUB)	3–0	Ivan Djorev (BUL)	3–0 PO
Sushil Kumar (IND)	0–3	Yandro Quintana (CUB)	0–3 PO
Ivan Djorev (BUL)	0–9	Sushil Kumar (IND)	0–3 PO

==== Pool 4 ====
Pos	Athlete	Pld	W	L	CP	TP	Qualification
1	David Pogosian (GEO)	2	2	0	6	7	Knockout round
2	Oyuunbilegiin Pürevbaatar (MGL)	2	1	1	4	5	
3	Eric Guerrero (USA)	2	0	2	2	2	

Source: Official website

	Score		CP
Oyuunbilegiin Pürevbaatar (MGL)	2–4	David Pogosian (GEO)	1–3 PP
Eric Guerrero (USA)	1–3	Oyuunbilegiin Pürevbaatar (MGL)	1–3 PP
David Pogosian (GEO)	3–1	Eric Guerrero (USA)	3–1 PP

==== Pool 5 ====
Pos	Athlete	Pld	W	L	CP	TP	Qualification
1	Masoud Mostafa-Jokar (IRI)	2	2	0	6	11	Knockout round
2	Besik Aslanasvili (GRE)	2	1	1	4	7	
3	Sahit Prizreni (ALB)	2	0	2	1	2	

Source: Official website

	Score		CP
Sahit Prizreni (ALB)	2–5	Besik Aslanasvili (GRE)	1–3 PP
Masoud Mostafa-Jokar (IRI)	8–0	Sahit Prizreni (ALB)	3–0 PO
Besik Aslanasvili (GRE)	2–3	Masoud Mostafa-Jokar (IRI)	1–3 PP

==== Pool 6 ====
Pos	Athlete	Pld	W	L	CP	TP	Qualification
1	Kenji Inoue (JPN)	3	2	1	8 (Note: Head-to-head result: JPN 3–1 KOR.)	22	Knockout round
2	Jung Young-ho (KOR)	3	2	1	8	23	
3	Lubos Cikel (AUT)	3	1	2	4 (Note: Head-to-head result: AUT 3–1 UZB.)	9	
4	Damir Zakhartdinov (UZB)	3	1	2	4	13	

Source: Official website
Notes:

	Score		CP
Lubos Cikel (AUT)	3–4	Jung Young-ho (KOR)	1–3 PP
Damir Zakhartdinov (UZB)	3–2	Kenji Inoue (JPN)	3–1 PP
Lubos Cikel (AUT)	6–5	Damir Zakhartdinov (UZB)	3–1 PP
Jung Young-ho (KOR)	2–7	Kenji Inoue (JPN)	1–3 PP
Lubos Cikel (AUT)	0–13	Kenji Inoue (JPN)	0–4 ST
Jung Young-ho (KOR)	17–5 Fall	Damir Zakhartdinov (UZB)	4–0 TO

=== Knockout round ===
Qualification
Vasyl Fedoryshyn (UKR)	6
Guivi Sissaouri (CAN)	0
Yandro Quintana (CUB)	5
David Pogosian (GEO)	0

Semifinals
Vasyl Fedoryshyn (UKR)	1
Yandro Quintana (CUB)	3
Masoud Mostafa-Jokar (IRI)	5
Kenji Inoue (JPN)	4

Gold medal match
Yandro Quintana (CUB)	4
Masoud Mostafa-Jokar (IRI)	0
Bronze medal match
Vasyl Fedoryshyn (UKR)	5
Kenji Inoue (JPN)	6

Classification 5–6
Guivi Sissaouri (CAN)
David Pogosian (GEO)	WO

== Final standing ==
Rank	Athlete
1st place, gold medalist(s)	Yandro Quintana (CUB)
2nd place, silver medalist(s)	Masoud Mostafa-Jokar (IRI)
3rd place, bronze medalist(s)	Kenji Inoue (JPN)
4	Vasyl Fedoryshyn (UKR)
5	David Pogosian (GEO)
6	Guivi Sissaouri (CAN)
7	Jung Young-ho (KOR)
8	Lubos Cikel (AUT)
9	Damir Zakhartdinov (UZB)
10	Murad Umakhanov (RUS)
11	Besik Aslanasvili (GRE)
12	Ulan Nadyrbek Uulu (KGZ)
13	Oyuunbilegiin Pürevbaatar (MGL)
14	Sushil Kumar (IND)
15	Tevfik Odabaşı (TUR)
16	Eric Guerrero (USA)
17	Sahit Prizreni (ALB)
18	Ivan Djorev (BUL)
19	Gergõ Wöller (HUN)
