= Serik Yeleuov =

Kazakhstani boxer (born 1980)

Personal information
- Full name: Серик Саматович Елеуов
- Nationality: Kazakhstan
- Born: 15 December 1980 (age 45) Karaganda, Kazakh SSR, Soviet Union
- Height: 1.69 m (5 ft 7 in)
- Weight: 60 kg (130 lb)

Sport
- Sport: Boxing
- Weight class: Lightweight
Medal record
Olympic Games
Bronze medal – third place	2004 Athens	Lightweight

Serik Samatovich Yeleuov (born 15 December 1980) is a Kazakhstani boxer who won the bronze medal in the men's lightweight (– 60 kg) division at the 2004 Summer Olympics. In the final bout, he defeated Iran's Mohamed Asheri. Yeleuov qualified for the Athens Games by placing first at the 1st AIBA Asian 2004 Olympic Qualifying Tournament in Guangzhou, China.

== Olympic results ==
- 1st round bye
- Defeated Manuel Félix Díaz (Dominican Republic) 28–16
- Defeated Domenico Valentino (Italy) 29–23
- Lost to Amir Khan (Great Britain) 26-40
