= Volodymyr Kravets =

Volodymyr Kravets may refer to:

- Volodymyr Kravets (boxer)
- Volodymyr Kravets (diplomat)
