= Theoharis Trasha =

Albanian weightlifter (born 1985)

Personal information
- Nationality: Albania
- Born: 21 April 1985 (age 41) Elbasan, Albania
- Height: 1.75 m (5 ft 9 in)
- Weight: 77 kg (170 lb)

Sport
- Sport: Weightlifting
- Event: 77 kg

Theoharis Trasha (born April 21, 1985, in Elbasan) is an Albanian weightlifter, who with his younger brother Gert Trasha competed at the 2004 Summer Olympics in Athens, where he finished 12th.
