= Taoufik Chobba =

Tunisian boxer (born 1982)

Personal information
- Nationality: Tunisian
- Born: 14 December 1982 (age 42)

Sport
- Sport: Boxing

Taoufik Chobba (born 14 December 1982) is a Tunisian boxer. He competed in the men's lightweight event at the 2004 Summer Olympics.
