= Wrestling at the 2004 Summer Olympics =

Wrestling at the Games of the XXVIII Olympiad
- Venue: Ano Liosia Olympic Hall
- Dates: 22–29 August 2004
- No. of events: 18
- Competitors: 342 from 66 nations

Wrestling at the 2004 Summer Olympics took place in the Ano Liosia Olympic Hall and was split into two disciplines, Freestyle and Greco-Roman which are further divided into different weight categories. Men competed in both disciplines whereas women only took part in the Freestyle event with 18 gold medals being contested in all. This was the first Olympic Games that included women's wrestling events on the program.

== Medalists ==
=== Men's freestyle ===
Event	Gold	Silver	Bronze
55 kg	Mavlet Batirov; Russia	Stephen Abas; United States	Chikara Tanabe; Japan
60 kg	Yandro Quintana; Cuba	Masoud Mostafa-Jokar; Iran	Kenji Inoue; Japan
66 kg	Elbrus Tedeyev; Ukraine	Jamill Kelly; United States	Makhach Murtazaliev; Russia
74 kg	Buvaisar Saitiev; Russia	Gennadiy Laliyev; Kazakhstan	Iván Fundora; Cuba
84 kg	Cael Sanderson; United States	Moon Eui-jae; South Korea	Sazhid Sazhidov; Russia
96 kg	Khadzhimurat Gatsalov; Russia	Magomed Ibragimov; Uzbekistan	Alireza Heidari; Iran
120 kg	Artur Taymazov; Uzbekistan	Alireza Rezaei; Iran	Aydın Polatçı; Turkey

=== Men's Greco-Roman ===
Event	Gold	Silver	Bronze
55 kg	István Majoros; Hungary	Geidar Mamedaliyev; Russia	Artiom Kiouregkian; Greece
60 kg	Jung Ji-hyun; South Korea	Roberto Monzón; Cuba	Armen Nazaryan; Bulgaria
66 kg	Farid Mansurov; Azerbaijan	Şeref Eroğlu; Turkey	Mkhitar Manukyan; Kazakhstan
74 kg	Aleksandr Dokturishvili; Uzbekistan	Marko Yli-Hannuksela; Finland	Varteres Samurgashev; Russia
84 kg	Aleksey Mishin; Russia	Ara Abrahamian; Sweden	Viachaslau Makaranka; Belarus
96 kg	Karam Gaber; Egypt	Ramaz Nozadze; Georgia	Mehmet Özal; Turkey
120 kg	Khasan Baroev; Russia	Georgiy Tsurtsumia; Kazakhstan	Rulon Gardner; United States

=== Women's freestyle ===
Event	Gold	Silver	Bronze
48 kg	Iryna Merleni; Ukraine	Chiharu Icho; Japan	Patricia Miranda; United States
55 kg	Saori Yoshida; Japan	Tonya Verbeek; Canada	Anna Gomis; France
63 kg	Kaori Icho; Japan	Sara McMann; United States	Lise Legrand; France
72 kg	Wang Xu; China	Guzel Manyurova; Russia	Kyoko Hamaguchi; Japan

== Medal table ==
Rank	Nation	Gold	Silver	Bronze	Total
1	Russia	5	2	3	10
2	Japan	2	1	3	6
3	Uzbekistan	2	1	0	3
4	Ukraine	2	0	0	2
5	United States	1	3	2	6
6	Cuba	1	1	1	3
7	South Korea	1	1	0	2
8	Azerbaijan	1	0	0	1
8	China	1	0	0	1
8	Egypt	1	0	0	1
8	Hungary	1	0	0	1
12	Iran	0	2	1	3
12	Kazakhstan	0	2	1	3
14	Turkey	0	1	2	3
15	Canada	0	1	0	1
15	Finland	0	1	0	1
15	Georgia	0	1	0	1
15	Sweden	0	1	0	1
19	France	0	0	2	2
20	Belarus	0	0	1	1
20	Bulgaria	0	0	1	1
20	Greece	0	0	1	1
Totals (22 entries)		18	18	18	54

== Participating nations ==
A total of 342 wrestlers from 66 nations competed at the Athens Games:

- Afghanistan (1)
- Albania (1)
- Algeria (1)
- Armenia (7)
- Australia (1)
- Austria (3)
- Azerbaijan (7)
- Belarus (10)
- Brazil (1)
- Bulgaria (13)
- Canada (7)
- China (9)
- Colombia (1)
- Cuba (12)
- Czech Republic (2)
- Denmark (1)
- Dominican Republic (1)
- Egypt (3)
- Estonia (1)
- Finland (2)
- France (6)
- Georgia (12)
- Germany (9)
- Great Britain (1)
- Greece (18)
- Guam (1)
- Guinea-Bissau (1)
- Hungary (9)
- India (7)
- Iran (13)
- Israel (3)
- Italy (6)
- Japan (13)
- Kazakhstan (12)
- Kyrgyzstan (8)
- Latvia (1)
- Lithuania (3)
- Macedonia (2)
- Moldova (2)
- Mongolia (6)
- Namibia (1)
- Nigeria (1)
- North Korea (1)
- Norway (1)
- Palau (1)
- Peru (1)
- Poland (9)
- Portugal (1)
- Puerto Rico (1)
- Romania (5)
- Russia (18)
- Senegal (1)
- Serbia and Montenegro (1)
- Slovakia (3)
- South Africa (1)
- South Korea (9)
- Spain (2)
- Sweden (7)
- Switzerland (2)
- Tajikistan (4)
- Tunisia (1)
- Turkey (12)
- Ukraine (16)
- United States (17)
- Uzbekistan (7)
- Venezuela (2)
