= Lubos Cikel =

Austrian freestyle wrestler

Personal information
- Full name: Ľuboš Čikel
- Nationality: Austria
- Born: 4 December 1975 (age 50) Trenčín, Czechoslovakia
- Height: 1.68 m (5 ft 6 in)
- Weight: 65 kg (143 lb)

Sport
- Style: Freestyle
- Club: AC Wals
- Coach: Max Aussenleitner

Ľuboš Čikel (born 4 December 1975 in Trenčín, Czechoslovakia) is a retired amateur Austrian freestyle wrestler, who competed in the men's lightweight category. He finished ninth in the 60-kg division at the 2003 World Wrestling Championships in New York City, New York, United States, and later represented his nation Austria at the 2004 Summer Olympics. Throughout his sporting career, Cikel trained full-time for AC Wals Wrestling Club in Wals-Siezenheim, under his personal coach Max Aussenleitner. Being born in the former Czechoslovakia, Cikel also holds a dual citizenship with Slovakia to compete in numerous wrestling tournaments.

Cikel qualified for his naturalized Austrian squad in the men's 60 kg class at the 2004 Summer Olympics in Athens by receiving a berth and placing ninth from the World Championships. He lost his opening match to South Korea's Jung Young-Ho in a tough, 4–5 sudden-death decision, but dismantled Uzbek wrestler, three-time Olympian, and 1999 world bronze medalist Damir Zakhartdinov into the ring with an astonishing 6–5 victory. Facing off against Japan's Kenji Inoue on his final bout, Cikel could not easily attack his opponent inside the mat, and lost the match with only nineteen seconds ahead of time because of the ten-point superiority limit. Finishing third in the prelim pool and eighth overall, Cikel's performance fell short to put him further into the quarterfinals.
