= Boxing at the 2004 Summer Olympics – Super heavyweight =

Boxing competitions

Super heavyweight boxing at the Games of the XXVIII Olympiad
- Venue: Peristeri Olympic Boxing Hall
- Date: 18–29 August 2004
- Competitors: 16 from 16 nations

Medalists
1st place, gold medalist(s)		Alexander Povetkin	Russia
2nd place, silver medalist(s)		Mohamed Aly	Egypt
3rd place, bronze medalist(s)		Michel López Núñez	Cuba
3rd place, bronze medalist(s)		Roberto Cammarelle	Italy

The super heavyweight boxing competition at the 2004 Summer Olympics in Athens was held from 18 to 29 August at Peristeri Olympic Boxing Hall. This is limited to those boxers weighing more than 91 kilograms.

== Competition format ==
Like all Olympic boxing events, the competition was a straight single-elimination tournament. This event consisted of 28 boxers who have qualified for the competition through various tournaments held in 2003 and 2004. The competition began with a preliminary round on 18 August, where the number of competitors was reduced to eight, and concluded with the final on 28 August.

All bouts consisted of four rounds of two minutes each, with one-minute breaks between rounds. Punches scored only if the white area on the front of the glove made full contact with the front of the head or torso of the opponent. Five judges scored each bout; three of the judges had to signal a scoring punch within one second for the punch to score. The winner of the bout was the boxer who scored the most valid punches by the end of the bout.

== Schedule ==
All times are Greece Standard Time (UTC+2)

Date	Time	Round
Wednesday, 18 August 2004	19:30	Round of 16
Monday, 23 August 2004	19:30	Quarterfinals
Friday, 27 August 2004	19:30	Semifinals
Sunday, 29 August 2004	13:30	Final

== Results ==
Round of 16
Alexander Povetkin (RUS)	RSC
Sergey Rozhnov (BUL)
Sebastian Köber (GER)	18
Mukhtarkhan Dildabekov (KAZ)	28
Gbenga Oloukun (NGR)	13
Roberto Cammarelle (ITA)	29
Aleksey Masikin (UKR)	23
Aliaksandr Apanasionak (BLR)	5
Mohamed Aly (EGY)	32
Carlos Takam (CMR)	19
Victor Bisbal (PUR)	17
Jaroslavas Jakšto (LTU)	26
Michel López Núñez (CUB)	18
Rustam Saidov (UZB)	13
Jason Estrada (USA)	30
Ma'afu Hawke (TGA)	11

Quarterfinals
Alexander Povetkin (RUS)	31
Mukhtarkhan Dildabekov (KAZ)	15
Roberto Cammarelle (ITA)	23
Aleksey Masikin (UKR)	21
Mohamed Aly (EGY)	19
Jaroslavas Jakšto (LTU)	11
Michel López Núñez (CUB)	21
Jason Estrada (USA)	7

Semifinals
Alexander Povetkin (RUS)	31
Roberto Cammarelle (ITA)	19
Mohamed Aly (EGY)	18
Michel López Núñez (CUB)	16

Finals
Alexander Povetkin (RUS)	WO
Mohamed Aly (EGY)
