= Damir Zakhartdinov =

Uzbek freestyle wrestler

Personal information
- Full name: Damir Zakhartdinov
- Nationality: Uzbekistan
- Born: 2 January 1976 (age 50) Tashkent, Uzbek SSR, Soviet Union
- Height: 1.67 m (5 ft 5 1/2 in)
- Weight: 60 kg (132 lb)

Sport
- Style: Freestyle
- Club: CSKA Tashkent
- Coach: Mamur Ruziev
Medal record
Men's freestyle wrestling
Representing Uzbekistan
World Championships
| Bronze medal – third place | 1999 Ankara | 58 kg |
Asian Championships
| Silver medal – second place | 2000 Guilin | 58 kg |
| Silver medal – second place | 2001 Ulaanbaatar | 63 kg |
| Silver medal – second place | 2003 New Delhi | 60 kg |
| Bronze medal – third place | 1999 Tashkent | 58 kg |
| Bronze medal – third place | 2005 Wuhan | 60 kg |

Damir Zakhartdinov (Uzbek: Дамир Захартдинов; born January 2, 1976, in Tashkent) is a retired amateur Uzbek freestyle wrestler, who competed in the men's lightweight category. Considering one of the nation's top wrestlers in his decade, Zakhartdinov has yielded a staggering record of six career medals, including a bronze in the 58-kg division at the 1999 World Wrestling Championships in Ankara, Turkey, and seized an opportunity to represent Uzbekistan in three editions of the Olympic Games (1996, 2000, and 2004). Having served as a soldier in CSKA Tashkent, Zakhartdinov trained throughout his sporting career as a member of its wrestling team under head coach Mamur Ruziev.

Zakhartdinov made his official debut at the 1996 Summer Olympics in Atlanta, where he competed in the men's bantamweight class (57 kg). Being successful early in the opening rounds, he entered the third round undefeated, but fell to Canada's Guivi Sissaouri with a 0–8 verdict. He lost again to Iran's Mohammad Talaei in the repechage 2–4, and subsequently, to Belarus' Aleksandr Guzov in the final playoff by a rigid 3–2 verdict, dropping him to eighth place.

Determined to return to the Olympic scene, Zakhartdinov entered the 2000 Summer Olympics in Sydney as a top medal contender in the men's featherweight division (58 kg). Earlier in the process, he picked up a bronze over Armenia's Martin Berberyan at the 1999 World Wrestling Championships in Ankara, Turkey. During the preliminary competition, Zakhartdinov lost his opening match 4–1 to Russia's Murad Ramazanov, but bounced back to subdue Turkey's Harun Doğan (3–0) and pin Moldova's Octavian Cuciuc with only thirty seconds left. Zakhartdinov placed first during the preliminary competition based on technical points, reached the semifinals, but fell behind Ukraine's Yevhen Buslovych in overtime with a 2–0 decision. Zakhartdinov faced U.S. wrestler Terry Brands in the bronze medal match, but could not throw him down the mat and missed the podium by a single point to close the record 3–2, finishing only in fourth place.

At the 2004 Summer Olympics in Athens, Zakhartdinov qualified for his third Uzbek squad, as a 28-year-old, in the men's 60 kg class. Weighing at two kilograms heavier than the previous Games, Zakhartdinov received a berth and rounded out the ninth spot in the lightweight category from the 2003 World Wrestling Championships in New York City, New York, United States. He started the preliminary competition with a surprising 3–2 victory over Japan's Kenji Inoue, before being overwhelmed by Austria's Lubos Cikel in a 5–6 verdict and South Korea's Jung Young-ho on a marvelous technical fall. Placing last in the preliminary competition and ninth overall, Zakhartdinov failed to advance to the quarterfinals.

Zakhartdinov also competed in two editions of the Asian Games (2002 and 2006), but fell behind the medal podium. Shortly after his sporting career ended in 2006, he moved to the United States to work with Rod Gaddy and coach young wrestlers for the Alabama State Wrestling Team in Birmingham, Alabama.
