= Ivan Djorev =

Bulgarian freestyle wrestler

Personal information
- Full name: Ivan Velkov Dzhorev
- Nationality: Bulgaria
- Born: 17 May 1976 (age 50) Yambol, Bulgaria
- Height: 1.63 m (5 ft 4 in)
- Weight: 55 kg (121 lb)

Sport
- Style: Freestyle
- Club: Sozopol Sports Club
- Coach: Angel Gochev
Medal record
Men's freestyle wrestling
Representing Bulgaria
European Championships
Bronze medal – third place	2004 Ankara	60 kg

Ivan Velkov Dzhorev (also Ivan Djorev, Bulgarian: Иван Велков Джорев; born 17 May 1976 in Yambol) is an amateur Bulgarian freestyle wrestler, who competed in the men's lightweight category. He won a bronze medal in the 55-kg division at the 2004 European Wrestling Championships in Ankara, Turkey, and later represented his nation Bulgaria at the Summer Olympics a few months later. Throughout his sporting career, Djorev trained as a member of the freestyle wrestling team for Sozopol Sports Club in Yambol, under his personal coach Angel Gochev.

Djorev qualified for the Bulgarian squad in the men's 60 kg class at the 2004 Summer Olympics in Athens by receiving an allocated berth from the International Federation of Associated Wrestling (FILA). He lost two straight matches each to Cuban wrestler and eventual winner Yandro Quintana and India's Sushil Kumar without collecting a single point, leaving him on the bottom of the prelim pool and finishing eighteenth overall in the final standings.
