= Arif Abdullayev =

Azerbaijani wrestler (born 1968)

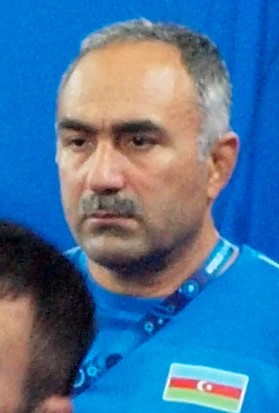

Medal record

Men's Freestyle wrestling

Representing Azerbaijan

World Championships
Gold medal – first place	2003 New York	60 kg

European Championships
Bronze medal – third place	1995 Fribourg	60 kg
Bronze medal – third place	1996 Budapest	60 kg
Bronze medal – third place	2002 Baku	60 kg

Arif Yadulla Abdullayev (Azerbaijani: Arif Abdullayev; born 28 August 1968, Baku, Azerbaijan) is an Azerbaijani wrestler. Abdullayev gained a gold medal at the World Championship in 2003 for Freestyle wrestling organized in New York.

== Personal life ==
He is originally from the village of Ağdərə in the Khizi district.

Abdullayev is married and lives in Baku. He is the brother of olympic champion wrestler Namig Abdullayev.
