= Sam Rukundo =

Ugandan boxer

Personal information
- Nickname: Rocky
- Nationality: Ugandan
- Born: Sam Rukundo; May 18, 1980 (age 46) Kampala, Uganda
- Weight: Lightweight
- Website: [Official website](https://web.archive.org/web/20060810081549/http://www.samrocky.com/)

Boxing career

Boxing record
- Total fights: 20
- Wins: 15
- Win by KO: 6
- Losses: 4
- Draws: 1

Sam ("Rocky") Rukundo (born May 18, 1980 in Kampala) is a Ugandan boxer. He competed at the 2004 Summer Olympics for his native African country. There he was stopped in the quarterfinals of the lightweight (– 60 kg) division by Russia's Murat Khrachev.

Rukundo qualified for the 2004 Athens Games by ending up in second place at the 2nd AIBA African 2004 Olympic Qualifying Tournament in GaboMauritius' Michael Medor.

After representing his native country at the Athens Olympics, Rukundo turned pro under the training of James Cook and the management of Mickey Helliet. He made his debut on the September 4 the same year, and moved to Sweden to improve as a professional fighter.

He has been African lightweight champion.

== Professional boxing record ==
20 fights	15 wins	4 losses
By knockout	6	0
By decision	9	4
Draws	1	

No.	Result	Record	Opponent	Type	Round, time	Date	Location	Notes
20	Loss	15–4–1	(Ukraine) Viktor Postol	MD	10	13 Mar 2011	(Georgia (country)) Sport Palace, Tbilisi, Georgia	
19	Loss	15–3–1	(France) Yvan Mendy	UD	12	10 Dec 2010	Salle Leo Lagrange, Pont-Sainte-Maxence, France	For WBF Intercontinental super lightweight title
18	Loss	15–2–1	(Ukraine) Valentyn Kuts	SD	12	21 May 2010	Sports Complex "Freestyle", Kyiv, Ukraine	
17	Loss	15–1–1	(United Kingdom) Gary Buckland	UD	12	19 Feb 2010	(United Kingdom) Fenton Manor Sports Complex, Stoke-on-Trent, England	
16	Win	15–0–1	(United Kingdom) Jimmy Briggs	PTS	4	25 Sep 2009	(United Kingdom) Colosseum, Watford, England	
15	Win	14–0–1	(Latvia) Sergejs Savrinovics	PTS	6	19 Jun 2009	Sonderbro Kulturhus, Horsens, Denmark	
14	Win	13–0–1	(Kenya) Peter Oluoch	KO	8 (10)	10 Jan 2009	Lugogo Stadium, Kampala, Uganda	
13	Win	12–0–1	(Russia) Alexander Saltykov	RTD	4 (8), 3:00	9 Feb 2008	Mediecentret, Aabybro, Denmark	
12	Win	11–0–1	(Denmark) Robert Osiobe	UD	12	24 Nov 2007	Nellerupgaard Hallen, Gilleleje, Denmark	Won vacant African lightweight and UBO super lightweight titles
11	Win	10–0–1	(Czech Republic) Araik Sachbazjan	UD	4	18 Aug 2007	Eriksdalshallen, Stockholm, Sweden	
10	Draw	9–0–1	(Denmark) Robert Osiobe	MD	4	31 Mar 2007	Lisebergshallen, Gothenburg, Sweden	
9	Win	9–0	(United Kingdom) Stuart Green	PTS	6	1 Feb 2007	(United Kingdom) Hotel Café Royal, London, England	
8	Win	8–0	(Romania) Gheorghe Ghiompirica	KO	2 (8)	8 Sep 2006	Idrættens Hus, Vejle, Denmark	
7	Win	7–0	(Nigeria) Silence Saheed	PTS	10	2 Feb 2006	(United Kingdom) New Connaught Rooms, London, England	
6	Win	6–0	(United Kingdom) Haroon Din	TKO	3 (4), 2:53	17 Nov 2005	(United Kingdom) Hotel Café Royal Mayfair, London, England	
5	Win	5–0	(Hungary) Bela Sandor	PTS	6	14 Oct 2005	Gymnasiehallen, Struer, Denmark	
4	Win	4–0	(United Kingdom) John Paul Ryan	TKO	4 (6), 1:07	26 May 2005	(United Kingdom) Hotel Café Royal, London, England	
3	Win	3–0	(United Kingdom) Billy Smith	TKO	3 (6), 1:31	23 Mar 2005	(United Kingdom) Equinox Nightclub, London, England	
2	Win	2–0	(United Kingdom) Chris Long	PTS	4	27 Jan 2005	(United Kingdom) Hotel Café Royal, London, England	
1	Win	1–0	(United Kingdom) Henry Janes	PTS	6	4 Nov 2004	(United Kingdom) Hotel Café Royal, London, England	
