= Tevfik Odabaşı =

Turkish freestyle wrestler

Personal information
- Nationality: Turkish
- Born: 20 October 1981 (age 44)
- Home town: Çorum, Turkey
- Height: 1.68 m (5 ft 6 in)
- Weight: 60 kg (132 lb)

Sport
- Country: Turkey
- Sport: Wrestling
- Event: Freestyle Wrestling
- Club: Amasya Şeker
Medal record
Men's freestyle wrestling
Representing Turkey
European Championships
Silver medal – second place	2006 Moscow	60 kg
Gold medal – first place	2004 Ankara	60 kg
Mediterranean Games
Silver medal – second place	2005 Almería	60 kg
Gold medal – first place	2001 Tunis	58 kg
Golden Grand Prix
Silver medal – second place	2008 Baku	60 kg
Summer Universiade
Silver medal – second place	2005 İzmir	60 kg
World Juniors Championships
Silver medal – second place	2000 Nantes	58 kg

Tevfik Odabasi (born 20 November 1981) is a freestyle wrestler from Turkey. He studied at Kırıkkale University.

== Wrestling career ==
He participated in Men's freestyle 60 kg at the 2004 Summer Olympics, where he was ranked in 15th place. In 2005, he won a silver medal at the Mediterranean Games in Almeria, Spain and another silver medal at the Summer Universiade in İzmir, Turkey. He also participated in Men's freestyle 60 kg at the 2008 Summer Olympics losing in the 1/16 of final with Murad Ramazanov.
