= Mohamed Aly (boxer) =

Egyptian boxer (born 1975)

Medal record

Representing Egypt

Men's Boxing

Olympic Games
Silver medal – second place	2004 Athens	Super Heavyweight

All-Africa Games
Silver medal – second place	2003 Abuja	Super Heavyweight

Mohammed Aly Reda (Egyptian Arabic: محمد على رضا; born February 19, 1975) is an Egyptian boxer who competed in the Super Heavyweight class (over 91 kg) at the 2004 Summer Olympics and won the silver medal.

At the All-Africa Games 2003, he lost the final to Nigeria's Gbenga Oluokun.

At the Olympics he beat Carlos Takam (Cameroon), Jaroslavas Jaksto (Lithuania) and sensationally Michel López Núñez (Cuba) but injured himself and lost the final with Alexandr Povetkin (Russia) by walkover.

After the Olympics, despite plenty of interest, Aly decided not to turn professional. Aly instead began a business venture with fellow Egyptian Olympic boxing teammate Neith Mohan. He created a franchised boxing academy called Mohammed Reda Boxing Academy in Cairo.
