= Manuel Vega =

Cuban baseball player

Medal record

Men's baseball

Representing Cuba

Summer Olympics
Gold medal – first place	2004 Athens	Team

Manuel Vega Tamayo (born 9 August 1975 in Niquero, Cuba) is a right-handed baseball pitcher who plays for Granma of the Cuban National Series. He was also part of the Cuban team at the 2004 Summer Olympics, and there became the first athlete from Granma Province to win an Olympic gold medal.

Vega who is considered a fastball pitcher, was selected for the Cuban national baseball team in 2004 after posting an 8–5 record with a 3.59 ERA during that year's National Series.
