= Volodymyr Kravets (boxer) =

Ukrainian boxer (born 1981)

Personal information
- Full name: Володимир Сергійович Кравець
- Nationality: Ukraine
- Born: May 31, 1981 (age 45) Krasnoarmiisk, Donetsk Oblast, Ukrainian SSR, Soviet Union
- Height: 1.63 m (5 ft 4 in)
- Weight: 60 kg (130 lb)

Sport
- Sport: Boxing
- Weight class: Lightweight
- Club: Ukraina Donetsk

Volodymyr Serhiyovych Kravets (born May 31, 1981, in Krasnoarmiisk, Donetsk Oblast) is a male boxer from Ukraine, who competed for his Eastern European country at the 2004 Summer Olympics in Athens, Greece. There he was stopped in the first round of the men's lightweight division (– 60 kg) by Pakistan's Asghar Ali Shah.

Kravets qualified for the Athens Games by ending up in second place at the 4th AIBA European 2004 Olympic Qualifying Tournament in Baku, Azerbaijan. In the final he lost to Russia's Murat Khrachev.
