= Anthony Little (boxer) =

Australian boxer

Anthony Little (born 6 November 1980 in Mullewa, Western Australia) is an Australian amateur lightweight boxer. Little is a left-handed boxer from Geraldton, Western Australia who started boxing at the age of 13. He was named Aboriginal Sports Star of the Year in 2000, 2001 and 2002 and was the first indigenous boxer from Western Australia to compete at the Olympics.

== Career ==
At the 2004 Summer Olympics in Athens, Little beat Tunisian Taoufik Chobba in the opening round but suffered a TKO loss to Murat Khrachev in his second bout.

He won the 2006 Commonwealth Games qualifier, beating Leonardo Zappavigna despite having a broken left hand but wasn't selected for the Games team due to the injury. A positive test to marijuana is also believed to have affected his selection. He bounced back, however, at the Oceanian Games to qualify for the 2008 Summer Olympics in Beijing.

At Beijing he beat Namibian Julius Indongo 14:2 but lost to Russian favorite Aleksei Tishchenko 3:11.

He was an Australian Institute of Sport scholarship holder.
