= Eric Guerrero =

American freestyle wrestler (born 1977)

Personal information
- Full name: Eric Guerrero
- Born: 15 May 1977 (age 49) San Jose, California, U.S.
- Height: 5 ft 7 in (170 cm)
- Weight: 60 kg (132 lb)

Sport
- Country: United States
- Team: USA
- Style: Freestyle and Folkstyle
- Club: Gator Wrestling Club
- College team: Oklahoma State
- Coach: John Smith
Medal record
Men's freestyle wrestling
Representing the United States
World Cup
Gold medal – first place	2003 Boise	60 kg
Pan American Games
Silver medal – second place	1999 Winnipeg	58 kg
Bronze medal – third place	2003 Santo Domingo	60 kg
Pan American Championships
Silver medal – second place	2000 Cali	58 kg
Cadet World Championships
Gold medal – first place	1993 Duisburg	55 kg
Collegiate Wrestling
Representing the Oklahoma State Cowboys
NCAA Division I Championships
Gold medal – first place	1997 Cedar Falls	126 lb
Gold medal – first place	1998 Cleveland	126 lb
Gold medal – first place	1999 State College	133 lb
Big 12 Championships
Gold medal – first place	1999 Ames	133 lb
Silver medal – second place	1997 Columbia	126 lb
Silver medal – second place	1998 Norman	126 lb
Big 8 Championships
Silver medal – second place	1996 Stillwater	126 lb

Eric Guerrero (born May 15, 1977) is a retired amateur American freestyle wrestler, who competed in the men's lightweight category. He won three consecutive NCAA (1997–1999) and four U.S. Open titles (2001–2004), scored two medals in the 58 and 60-kg division at the Pan American Games (1999 and 2003), and represented the United States at the 2004 Summer Olympics.

A graduate of Oklahoma State University, Guerrero has also served as a member of the wrestling squad for the Oklahoma State Cowboys. Being part of the university's staff, he has led the Cowboys to two NCAA tournament trophies, eleven national champions, five Big-12 conference titles, and thirty-six NCAA All-Americans. For displaying his sportsmanship and expertise in coaching, Guerrero has been inducted to the USA Wrestling Hall of Fame in June 2014.

== Career ==
=== College ===
Guerrero began his sporting career as a member of the Independence High School wrestling team. While still in high school, he won a cadet world title in 1993, was a first-team ASICS All-American (1994 and 1995), won junior world and national titles in 1995, and was named California Male Athlete of the Year. Due to his stellar high school career, Guerrero was recruited by Oklahoma State University in Stillwater, Oklahoma, where he became a star member of the Cowboy wrestling squad under head coach and two-time Olympic champion John Smith.

Guerrero compiled a 117–13 overall record while wrestling for the Cowboys from 1996 to 1999. As a true freshman, he took fifth-place at the NCAA Division I Wrestling Championships. In 1997, he won his first NCAA Championship at the 126-pound weight class and would repeat this triumph in 1998 at 126 pounds, and in 1999 at 133 pounds. In his final year, Guerrero dominated the field, highlighted by a perfect 31–0 record in which he recorded four straight technical falls in his first four matches, finishing with twelve technical falls and seven major decisions overall, and then prevailing 3–1 over Iowa State University's Cody Sanderson in achieving his third-straight NCAA title.

Guerrero was a key contributor to the Oklahoma State Cowboys' success during his time there, becoming one of only twelve four-time NCAA All-Americans in Oklahoma State University's wrestling history. Additionally, he was recognized as a two-time Academic All-America selection.

=== Freestyle wrestling ===
Upon completing his college career at Oklahoma State in 1999, Guerrero joined the U.S. world wrestling team, eventually earning his first berth at the World Championships. In the same year, he picked up a silver medal in the 58-kg division at the Pan American Games in Winnipeg, Manitoba, Canada, losing only to the host nation's Guivi Sissaouri on the final bout.

While competing internationally, Guerrero achieved four U.S. Open titles (2001–2004), won a World Cup series trophy in 2003, and took part as a member of the U.S. wrestling team in three more World Championships. At the 2003 Pan American Games in Santo Domingo, Dominican Republic, Guerrero pinned his Puerto Rican rival Luis Ortiz to clinch the bronze medal in the 60-kg division.

Guerrero qualified for the U.S. wrestling team on his major debut in the men's 60 kg class at the 2004 Summer Olympics in Athens. Earlier in the process, he thrashed his opponent Mike Zadick on the final bout to claim a spot on the U.S. team from the Olympic Trials. Guerrero lost two straight matches each at 1–3 in overtime to Mongolia's Oyuunbilegiin Pürevbaatar and Georgia's David Pogosian, leaving him on the bottom of the pool and placing sixteenth in the final standings. Shortly after the Games, Guerrero retired from competitive wrestling to turn his focus on coaching.

== Coaching ==
Guerrero initially joined his alma mater's team staff as a strength and conditioning coach in 2001, until he was promoted into the position of a full-time assistant coach for the Oklahoma State Cowboys, following the 2004 Summer Olympics. During his time in the staff, he helped the Cowboys produce four consecutive NCAA titles, eight Big 12 Conference titles, and thirty-six NCAA All-Americans to their college records. Additionally, he coached eleven wrestlers from the team, whom they later became NCAA champions in their respective weight categories, including 2012 Olympic bronze medalist Coleman Scott in men's 60 kg (132 lb).

In 2009, Guerrero was appointed as head coach for the U.S. team at the FILA Junior World Wrestling Championships in Ankara, Turkey, and led his squad to a most spectacular display in 11 years.

Following his nine-year duration on the Oklahoma State wrestling staff, Guerrero was upgraded to his position as an associate head coach for the 2012–2013 season. On June 21, 2014, Guerrero was formally inducted into the USA Wrestling Hall of Fame as a Distinguished Member.

== Personal life ==
Guerrero was married to former Miss Texas and Miss America top-ten finalist Kristen Blair in the summer of 2012. The couple resided in Stillwater, Oklahoma with their two children. He has four children (3 sons and 1 daughter).
