= Luis Borroto =

Cuban baseball player

Medal record

Representing Cuba

Men's baseball

World Baseball Classic
Silver medal – second place	2006 San Diego	Team

Summer Olympics
Gold medal – first place	2004 Athens	Team

Luis Borroto Jiménez (born August 24, 1982) is a Cuban baseball player. He was born in Sagua la Grande, Villa Clara Province, Cuba. A starting pitcher with Villa Clara of the Cuban National Series, Borroto competed internationally with the Cuba national baseball team at the 2004 Summer Olympics and the 2006 World Baseball Classic.
