= Domenico Valentino =

Italian boxer (born 1984)

Personal information
- Born: 17 May 1984 (age 42)
Medal record
Men's amateur boxing
Representing Italy
World Amateur Championships
Gold medal – first place	2009 Milan	Lightweight
Silver medal – second place	2007 Chicago	Lightweight
Bronze medal – third place	2005 Mianyang	Lightweight
Bronze medal – third place	2011 Baku	Lightweight
Bronze medal – third place	2013 Almaty	Lightweight
European Amateur Championships
Silver medal – second place	2011 Ankara	Lightweight
Bronze medal – third place	2004 Pula	Lightweight
EU Amateur Championships
Gold medal – first place	2004 Madrid	Lightweight
Gold medal – first place	2005 Cagliari	Lightweight
Gold medal – first place	2006 Pécs	Lightweight
Bronze medal – third place	2007 Dublin	Lightweight
Mediterranean Games
Gold medal – first place	2005 Almeíra	Lightweight
Gold medal – first place	2009 Pescara	Lightweight

Domenico Valentino (born 17 May 1984 in Marcianise) is a boxer from Italy.

The hard punching Valentino won a bronze medal at lightweight at the 2004 European Amateur Boxing Championships in Pula, Croatia.

He participated in the 2004 Summer Olympics. There he was stopped in the quarterfinals of the Lightweight (60 kg) division by Kazakhstan's eventual bronze medalist Serik Yeleuov.

At the 2005 World Amateur Boxing Championships he once more won bronze.

At the Euro 2006 he lost early to Olexandr Klyuchko 18:30.

At the 2007 World Amateur Boxing Championships he at last made it to the finals beating North Korean Kim Song-Guk but lost to Frankie Gavin.

At the 2008 Olympics he beat Tahar Tamsamani but lost to Cuban favorite Yordenis Ugás 2:10.

At the 2009 World Amateur Boxing Championships he used the absence of Gavin (who had turned professional) and Ugas (who had gone up in weight) and home advantage to win his first major title.

At the 2012 Olympics, he again reached the quarter-finals, losing to eventual bronze medalist Evaldas Petrauskas.

Valentino has signed up for the new AIBA professional league, called APB (AIBA Pro-Boxing), which will launch in autumn 2013.

== Amateur results ==
2004 Athens Olympic Games

- 1st round bye
- Defeated Mohammed Asheri (Iran) 37-18
- Lost to Serik Yeleuov (Kazakhstan) 23-29

2007 AIBA World Amateur championships

- Defeated Luis Ernesto Rueda (Argentina) RSC 3 (1:43)
- Defeated Daijiro Hoshi (Japan) 27-9
- Defeated Eric Donovan (Ireland) 29-12
- Defeated Hrachik Javakhyan (Armenia) 27-12
- Defeated Kim Song-Guk (North Korea) 22-14
- Lost to Frankie Gavin (England) 10-18

2009 AIBA World Amateur championships
