= Danny Miranda =

Cuban baseball player (1978–2026)

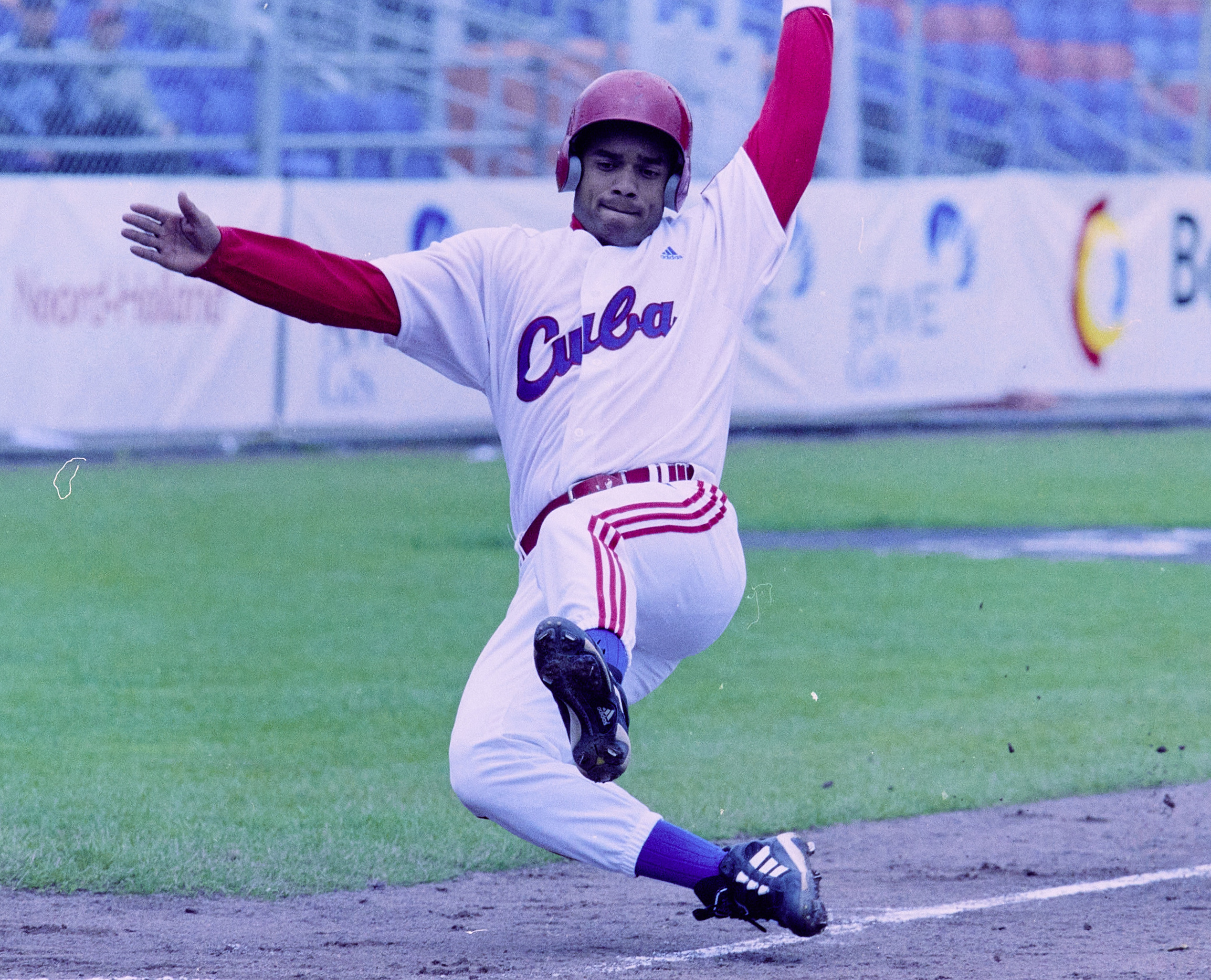
- Miranda in 2002
- First baseman, left fielder
- Born: 12 November 1978; Morón, Ciego de Ávila Province, Cuba
- Died: 5 April 2026 (aged 47)
- Batted: Right Threw: Right

Teams
- Ciego de Ávila (1997–2008)
Medals
Men's baseball
Representing Cuba
Summer Olympics
Gold medal – first place	2004 Athens	Team

Danny Miranda Agramonte (12 November 1978 – 5 April 2026) was a Cuban first baseman who played his entire career for Ciego de Ávila of the Cuban National Series. Miranda represented Cuba at many international competitions including the 2004 Summer Olympics in Athens, where the Cuban team won the gold medal.

During the 2005–06 Cuban National Series, Miranda led Ciego de Ávila with 18 home runs and 73 runs batted in, and tied for the team lead in doubles (17) while maintaining a .310 batting average.

Miranda died from an intestinal blockage on 5 April 2026, at the age of 47.
