= Mohammad Asheri =

Iranian boxer

Personal information
- Nationality: Iranian
- Born: 21 June 1975 (age 49)

Sport
- Sport: Boxing

Mohammad Asheri (Persian: محمد عاشری; born 21 June 1975) is an Iranian boxer. He competed in the men's lightweight event at the 2004 Summer Olympics.
