= Murat Khrachev =

Russian boxer (born 1983)

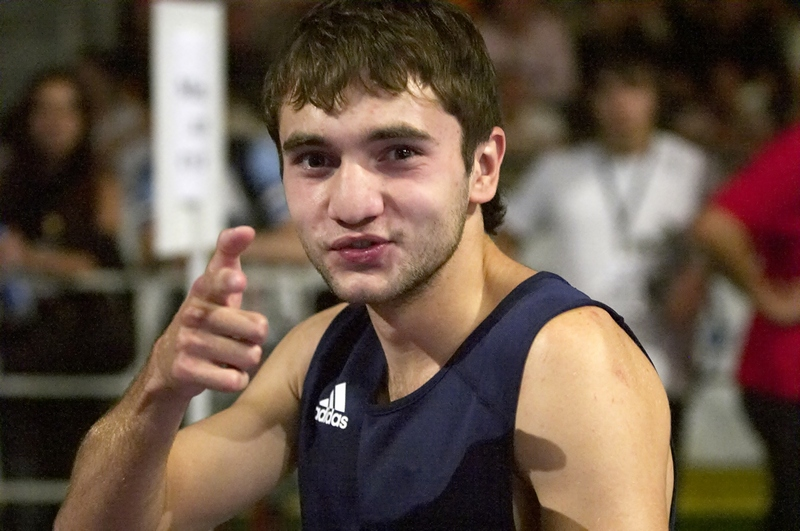

Personal information
- Born: July 25, 1983 (age 42)
Medal record
Men's Boxing
Representing Russia
Olympic Games
Bronze medal – third place	2004 Athens	Lightweight
World Cup
Gold medal – first place	2005 Moscow	Lightweight

Murat Petrovich Khrachev (Russian: Мурат Петрович Храчев; born July 25, 1983, in Cherkessk, Karachayevo-Cherkesskaya) is a Russian boxer who competed in the men's lightweight division (– 60 kg) at the 2004 Summer Olympics and won the bronze medal.

Khrachev qualified for the 2004 Summer Olympics by ending up in first place at the 4th AIBA European 2004 Olympic Qualifying Tournament in Baku, Azerbaijan. In 2005 he was part of the Russian team that won the 2005 Boxing World Cup.

== Olympic results ==
- Defeated Chen Tongzhou (China) 40-29
- Defeated Anthony Little (Australia) RSC 3 (1:52)
- Defeated Sam Rukundo (Uganda) 31-18
- Lost to Mario Kindelán (Cuba) 18-31

== Awards ==
- Medal of the Order "For Merit to the Fatherland", II degree (2005)
