= Ahmed Sadiq =

Nigerian boxer (born 1979)

Personal information
- Born: July 7, 1979 (age 46)

Sport
- Sport: boxing
Medal record
Representing Nigeria
Men's Boxing
All-Africa Games
Gold medal – first place	2003 Abuja	Lightweight

Ahmed Sadiq (born 7 July 1979) is a Nigerian boxer who participated in the 2004 Summer Olympics for Nigeria. There he was outscored in the first round of the Lightweight (60 kg) division by Cuba's eventual winner Mario César Kindelán Mesa. One year earlier, he won the gold medal in his weight division at the All-Africa Games in Abuja, Nigeria.
