= Gert Trasha =

Albanian weightlifter (born 1988)

Personal information
- Nationality: Albania
- Born: 31 January 1988 (age 38) Elbasan, Albania
- Height: 1.65 m (5 ft 5 in)
- Weight: 69 kg (152 lb)

Sport
- Sport: Weightlifting
- Event: 69 kg

Gert Trasha (born January 31, 1988, in Elbasan) is an Albanian weightlifter. At age sixteen, Trasha became one of the youngest weightlifters to mark their official debut at the 2004 Summer Olympics in Athens, representing his nation Albania. He placed thirteenth in the men's featherweight class (62 kg), as he successfully lifted 115 kg in the single-motion snatch, and hoisted 140 kg in the two-part, shoulder-to-overhead clean and jerk, for a total of 255 kg.

At the 2008 Summer Olympics in Beijing, Trasha switched to a heavier class by competing in the men's lightweight division. Unlike his previous Olympics, Trasha did not finish the event, after failing to lift a snatch of 136 kg in three attempts.
