= Besik Aslanasvili =

Greek wrestler (born 1976)

Personal information
- Full name: Besik Aslanasvili
- Nationality: Greece
- Born: 22 October 1976 (age 49) Tbilisi, Georgian SSR, Soviet Union
- Height: 1.61 m (5 ft 3 1/2 in)
- Weight: 60 kg (132 lb)

Sport
- Style: Freestyle
- Club: Atlas Kallitheas
- Coach: Michail Charachura
Medal record
Men's freestyle wrestling
Representing Greece
Mediterranean Games
Gold medal – first place	2001 Tunis	63 kg

Besik Aslanasvili (Greek: Μπέζικ Ασλανασβίλι; born October 22, 1976, in Tbilisi, Georgian SSR) is a retired amateur Greek freestyle wrestler, who competed in the men's lightweight category. Holding a dual citizenship to compete internationally, Aslanasvili has been selected to the nation's Olympic wrestling team when Greece hosted the 2004 Summer Olympics in Athens, and also picked up a gold medal in the 63-kg division at the 2001 Mediterranean Games in Tunis, Tunisia. Throughout his sporting career, Aslanasvili trained full-time for Atlas Kallitheas Wrestling Club in Athens, under personal coach Michail Charachura.

Aslanasvili qualified for the naturalized Greek squad in the men's lightweight class (60 kg), when Greece welcomed the world to the 2004 Summer Olympics in Athens. He filled up an entry by the International Federation of Association Wrestling and the Hellenic Olympic Committee, as Greece received an automatic berth for being the host nation. Amassed the home crowd inside Ano Liossia Olympic Hall, Aslanasvili opened the prelim pool with a shut out 5–2 victory over neighboring Albania's Sahit Prizreni, before losing to Iran's Masoud Mostafa-Jokar by a rigid 3–2 decision. Placing second in the pool and eleventh in the final standings, Aslanasvili's performance was not enough to put him further into the medal rounds.
