= Michel López (boxer) =

Cuban boxer (born 1976)

Personal information
- Full name: Michel López Núñez
- Nationality: Cuba
- Born: 5 November 1976 (age 50) Pinar del Río
- Height: 1.89 m (6 ft 2 in)
- Weight: 91 kg (201 lb)

Sport
- Sport: Boxing
- Weight class: Super Heavyweight
- Club: Cear, Habana
Medal record
Olympic Games
Bronze medal – third place	2004 Athens	Super Heavyweight
Pan American Games
Silver medal – second place	2003 S Domingo	Super Heavyweight
Central American and Caribbean Games
Gold medal – first place	2006 Cartagena	Super Heavyweight

Michel López Núñez (born 5 November 1976) is a Cuban former amateur boxer, who won the Super Heavyweight bronze medal at the 2004 Summer Olympics. He is the older brother of Mijaín López Núñez, a Cuban Greco-Roman five-time Olympic gold medalist wrestler.

== Career ==
Olympic Results were:

- Defeated Rustam Saidov (Uzbekistan) (18–13)
- Defeated Jason Estrada (USA) (21–7)
- Lost to Mohamed Aly (Egypt) (16–18)

In 2007 he lost at the National Championships to young Robert Alfonso.
