= Yandro Quintana =

Cuban wrestler (born 1980)

Personal information
- Full name: Yandro Miguel Quintana Rivalta
- Born: January 30, 1980 (age 46) Ciego de Ávila, Cuba
- Height: 162 cm (5 ft 4 in)

Sport
- Country: Cuba
- Weight class: 60 kg
Medal record
Men's freestyle wrestling
Representing Cuba
Olympic Games
Gold medal – first place	2004 Athens	60 kg
World Championships
Silver medal – second place	2003 New York	60 kg
Silver medal – second place	2005 Budapest	60 kg
Pan American Games
Gold medal – first place	2003 Santo Domingo	60 kg
Gold medal – first place	2007 Rio de Janeiro	60 kg
Pan American Wrestling Championships
Gold medal – first place	2000 Cali	58 kg
Gold medal – first place	2001 Santo Domingo	58 kg
Gold medal – first place	2002 Maracaibo	60 kg
Gold medal – first place	2004 Guatelama	60 kg

Yandro Miguel Quintana Rivalta (born January 30, 1980, in Ciego de Ávila) is a Cuban wrestler who competed in the Men's Freestyle 60 kg at the 2004 Summer Olympics which were also his first Olympics. He won the gold medal by defeating Masuod Jokar in the final with the help of his coach Filberto Delgado. He stands 5'2 and 132 lbs. In 2003 he came in first at the Pan American Games. He now resides in Havana, Cuba.
