= Jung Young-ho =

South Korean wrestler

Jung Young-Ho (Korean: 정영호; born July 13, 1982) is a male freestyle wrestler from South Korea. He participated in the men's freestyle 66 kg at the 2008 Summer Olympics, but was eliminated in the 1/8 of final losing against Serafim Barzakov.

He also participated in the men's freestyle 60 kg at the 2004 Summer Olympics where he was ranked 7th.
