= Kenji Inoue =

Japanese freestyle wrestler (born 1976)

Medal record

Men's freestyle wrestling

Representing Japan

Olympic Games
Bronze medal – third place	2004 Athens	60 kg

Kenji Inoue (井上 謙二, Inoue Kenji) (born November 5, 1976, in Kyoto) is a Japanese wrestler who won the bronze medal in the Men's Freestyle 60 kg at the 2004 Summer Olympics.

== Awards ==
- Tokyo Sports
  - Wrestling Special Award (2004)
