= Masoud Mostafa-Jokar =

Iranian wrestler (born 1977)

Personal information
- Nationality: Iranian
- Born: September 21, 1977 (age 48) Jowkar, Iran

Sport
- Country: Iran
- Sport: Wrestling
Medal record
Men's freestyle wrestling
Representing Iran
Olympic Games
Silver medal – second place	2004 Athens	60 kg
World Cup
Silver medal – second place	2001 Baltimore	60 kg

Masoud Mostafa Jokar (Persian: مسعود مصطفی جوکار; born September 21, 1977, in Jowkar) is an Iranian wrestler who competed in the Men's Freestyle 60 kg at the 2004 Summer Olympics and won the silver medal. Masoud was born in an athletic family and after his good demonstration in Takhti Cup Tehran, 1999, he was invited to the camp of national teams for Olympic preparation. He was the spare of Mohammad Talaei, Iranian wrestler in 63 kg. However he became a fixed member of the team in next Olympic where he won his silver medal.

His younger brother Meisam Mostafa-Jokar is also a wrestler, who has been the 2014 Asian Games champion in the 63 kg category and also participated in Men's freestyle 74 kg at 2008 Summer Olympics.
