= 1998 World Wrestling Championships – Men's freestyle 63 kg =

Men's freestyle 63 kg at the 1998 World Championships
- Venue: Azadi Indoor Stadium
- Dates: 8–10 September 1998
- Competitors: 28 from 28 nations

Medalists
| gold medal | Serafim Barzakov | Bulgaria |
| silver medal | Abbas Hajkenari | Iran |
| bronze medal | Cary Kolat | United States |

The men's freestyle 63 kilograms is a competition featured at the 1998 World Wrestling Championships, and was held at the Azadi Indoor Stadium in Tehran, Iran from 8 to 10 September 1998.

== Results ==
=== Round 1 ===
| | Score | |
Round of 32
| Serafim Barzakov (BUL) | 9–4 | Karim Makhlouf (FRA) |
| Zsolt Bánkuti (HUN) | 0–5 | Cary Kolat (USA) |
| Liao Kai (CHN) | 0–11 | Marty Calder (CAN) |
| Sergey Smal (BLR) | 4–2 | Tserenbaataryn Tsogtbayar (MGL) |
| Jang Jae-sung (KOR) | 11–0 | Edison Hurtado (COL) |
| Abbas Hajkenari (IRI) | 2–2 | Georgios Moustopoulos (GRE) |
| Takahiro Wada (JPN) | 8–6 | Șerban Mumjiev (ROM) |
| Lucjan Gralak (POL) | 5–4 | John Melling (GBR) |
| Arout Parsekian (CYP) | 0–10 | David Lejava (GEO) |
| Efraim Kahraman (TUR) | 11–0 | Mukesh Kumar (IND) |
| Berik Dengelbayev (KAZ) | 0–3 | Shamil Afandiyev (AZE) |
| Magomed Azizov (RUS) | 9–2 | Ayman Al-Shalabi (SYR) |
| Štefan Fernyák (SVK) | 11–0 | Hennie Bekker (RSA) |
| Elbrus Tedeyev (UKR) | 3–0 | Jürgen Scheibe (GER) |

=== Round 2 ===
| | Score | |
Round of 16
| Serafim Barzakov (BUL) | 3–1 | Cary Kolat (USA) |
| Marty Calder (CAN) | 1–3 | Sergey Smal (BLR) |
| Jang Jae-sung (KOR) | 0–9 Fall | Abbas Hajkenari (IRI) |
| Takahiro Wada (JPN) | 0–4 | Lucjan Gralak (POL) |
| David Lejava (GEO) | 5–2 | Efraim Kahraman (TUR) |
| Shamil Afandiyev (AZE) | 4–6 | Magomed Azizov (RUS) |
| Štefan Fernyák (SVK) | 2–7 | Elbrus Tedeyev (UKR) |
Repechage
| Karim Makhlouf (FRA) | 0–3 | Zsolt Bánkuti (HUN) |
| Liao Kai (CHN) | 0–10 | Tserenbaataryn Tsogtbayar (MGL) |
| Edison Hurtado (COL) | 1–10 | Georgios Moustopoulos (GRE) |
| Șerban Mumjiev (ROM) | 12–1 | John Melling (GBR) |
| Arout Parsekian (CYP) | 1–3 | Mukesh Kumar (IND) |
| Berik Dengelbayev (KAZ) | 12–2 | Ayman Al-Shalabi (SYR) |
| Hennie Bekker (RSA) | 0–11 | Jürgen Scheibe (GER) |

=== Round 3 ===
| | Score | |
Quarterfinals
| Serafim Barzakov (BUL) | 4–0 | Sergey Smal (BLR) |
| Abbas Hajkenari (IRI) | 4–0 | Lucjan Gralak (POL) |
| David Lejava (GEO) | 0–10 | Magomed Azizov (RUS) |
| Elbrus Tedeyev (UKR) | | Bye |
Repechage
| Zsolt Bánkuti (HUN) | 0–4 | Tserenbaataryn Tsogtbayar (MGL) |
| Georgios Moustopoulos (GRE) | 1–4 | Șerban Mumjiev (ROM) |
| Mukesh Kumar (IND) | 1–5 | Berik Dengelbayev (KAZ) |
| Jürgen Scheibe (GER) | 0–5 | Cary Kolat (USA) |
| Marty Calder (CAN) | 1–3 | Jang Jae-sung (KOR) |
| Takahiro Wada (JPN) | 1–3 | Efraim Kahraman (TUR) |
| Shamil Afandiyev (AZE) | 4–2 | Štefan Fernyák (SVK) |

=== Round 4 ===
| | Score | |
Repechage
| Tserenbaataryn Tsogtbayar (MGL) | 10–4 | Șerban Mumjiev (ROM) |
| Berik Dengelbayev (KAZ) | 3–4 | Cary Kolat (USA) |
| Jang Jae-sung (KOR) | 7–0 | Efraim Kahraman (TUR) |
| Shamil Afandiyev (AZE) | 4–6 | Sergey Smal (BLR) |
| Lucjan Gralak (POL) | 4–1 | David Lejava (GEO) |

=== Round 5 ===
| | Score | |
Semifinals
| Elbrus Tedeyev (UKR) | 2–3 | Serafim Barzakov (BUL) |
| Abbas Hajkenari (IRI) | 6–2 | Magomed Azizov (RUS) |
Repechage
| Tserenbaataryn Tsogtbayar (MGL) | 3–4 | Cary Kolat (USA) |
| Jang Jae-sung (KOR) | 3–1 | Sergey Smal (BLR) |
| Lucjan Gralak (POL) | | Bye |

=== Round 6 ===
| | Score | |
Repechage
| Lucjan Gralak (POL) | 1–10 | Cary Kolat (USA) |
| Jang Jae-sung (KOR) | | Bye |

=== Round 7 ===
| | Score | |
Repechage
| Elbrus Tedeyev (UKR) | 8–6 | Jang Jae-sung (KOR) |
| Cary Kolat (USA) | 3–1 | Magomed Azizov (RUS) |

=== Finals ===
| | Score | |
Bronze medal match
| Elbrus Tedeyev (UKR) | 1–3 | Cary Kolat (USA) |
Final
| Serafim Barzakov (BUL) | 6–2 Fall | Abbas Hajkenari (IRI) |
