= 1997 World Wrestling Championships – Men's freestyle 63 kg =

Men's freestyle 63 kg at the 1997 World Championships
- Venue: Yenisey Sports Palace
- Dates: 28–30 August 1997
- Competitors: 31 from 31 nations

Medalists
gold medal	Abbas Hajkenari	Iran
silver medal	Cary Kolat	United States
bronze medal	Magomed Azizov	Russia

The men's freestyle 63 kilograms is a competition featured at the 1997 World Wrestling Championships, and was held at the Yenisey Sports Palace in Krasnoyarsk, Russia from 28 to 30 August 1997.

== Results ==
=== Round 1 ===
	Score	
Round of 32
Araik Baghdadyan (ARM)	10–0	Zsolt Bánkuti (HUN)
Štefan Fernyák (SVK)	1–6	Elbrus Tedeyev (UKR)
Sergey Smal (BLR)	13–2	Pasi Kohtala (FIN)
Eddy Azuaje (VEN)	3–1	Engin Ürün (GER)
Takahiro Wada (JPN)	1–4	Cary Kolat (USA)
Edison Hurtado (COL)	5–10	Giorgi Kharebava (GEO)
Șerban Mumjiev (ROM)	0–3	Gürsel Uzunca (TUR)
Magomed Azizov (RUS)	6–1	Shamil Afandiyev (AZE)
Mais Ibadov (UZB)	2–9	Liao Kai (CHN)
Carlos Ortiz (CUB)	1–1	Giovanni Schillaci (ITA)
Marty Calder (CAN)	8–0	Martin Müller (SUI)
John Melling (GBR)	0–6	Tserenbaataryn Tsogtbayar (MGL)
Maksat Boburbekov (KGZ)	10–12	Karim Makhlouf (FRA)
Lucjan Gralak (POL)	0–3	Abbas Hajkenari (IRI)
Ismail Boziyev (KAZ)	0–4	Georgios Moustopoulos (GRE)
Noh Won-chang (KOR)		Bye

=== Round 2 ===
	Score	
Round of 16
Noh Won-chang (KOR)	2–4	Araik Baghdadyan (ARM)
Elbrus Tedeyev (UKR)	1–4	Sergey Smal (BLR)
Eddy Azuaje (VEN)	0–10	Cary Kolat (USA)
Giorgi Kharebava (GEO)	3–6	Gürsel Uzunca (TUR)
Magomed Azizov (RUS)	7–0 Fall	Liao Kai (CHN)
Giovanni Schillaci (ITA)	3–0	Marty Calder (CAN)
Tserenbaataryn Tsogtbayar (MGL)	11–6	Karim Makhlouf (FRA)
Abbas Hajkenari (IRI)	4–0	Georgios Moustopoulos (GRE)
Repechage
Zsolt Bánkuti (HUN)	1–6	Štefan Fernyák (SVK)
Pasi Kohtala (FIN)	0–6	Engin Ürün (GER)
Takahiro Wada (JPN)	12–0	Edison Hurtado (COL)
Șerban Mumjiev (ROM)	0–11	Shamil Afandiyev (AZE)
Mais Ibadov (UZB)	0–10	Carlos Ortiz (CUB)
Martin Müller (SUI)	0–4	John Melling (GBR)
Maksat Boburbekov (KGZ)	1–3	Lucjan Gralak (POL)
Ismail Boziyev (KAZ)		Bye

=== Round 3 ===
	Score	
Quarterfinals
Araik Baghdadyan (ARM)	1–3	Sergey Smal (BLR)
Cary Kolat (USA)	1–0	Gürsel Uzunca (TUR)
Magomed Azizov (RUS)	8–1	Giovanni Schillaci (ITA)
Tserenbaataryn Tsogtbayar (MGL)	3–4	Abbas Hajkenari (IRI)
Repechage
Ismail Boziyev (KAZ)	1–2	Štefan Fernyák (SVK)
Engin Ürün (GER)	0–3	Takahiro Wada (JPN)
Shamil Afandiyev (AZE)	8–2	Carlos Ortiz (CUB)
John Melling (GBR)	2–3	Lucjan Gralak (POL)
Noh Won-chang (KOR)	4–10	Elbrus Tedeyev (UKR)
Eddy Azuaje (VEN)	1–9	Giorgi Kharebava (GEO)
Liao Kai (CHN)	7–9	Marty Calder (CAN)
Karim Makhlouf (FRA)	3–8	Georgios Moustopoulos (GRE)

=== Round 4 ===
	Score	
Repechage
Štefan Fernyák (SVK)	2–8	Takahiro Wada (JPN)
Shamil Afandiyev (AZE)	9–1	Lucjan Gralak (POL)
Elbrus Tedeyev (UKR)	5–3	Giorgi Kharebava (GEO)
Marty Calder (CAN)	7–1	Georgios Moustopoulos (GRE)
Araik Baghdadyan (ARM)	3–2	Gürsel Uzunca (TUR)
Giovanni Schillaci (ITA)	4–6 Fall	Tserenbaataryn Tsogtbayar (MGL)

=== Round 5 ===
	Score	
Semifinals
Sergey Smal (BLR)	2–4	Cary Kolat (USA)
Magomed Azizov (RUS)	1–8	Abbas Hajkenari (IRI)
Repechage
Takahiro Wada (JPN)	3–7	Shamil Afandiyev (AZE)
Elbrus Tedeyev (UKR)	3–0	Marty Calder (CAN)
Araik Baghdadyan (ARM)	3–5	Tserenbaataryn Tsogtbayar (MGL)

=== Round 6 ===
	Score	
Repechage
Shamil Afandiyev (AZE)	3–5	Elbrus Tedeyev (UKR)
Tserenbaataryn Tsogtbayar (MGL)		Bye

=== Round 7 ===
	Score	
Repechage
Sergey Smal (BLR)	12–2 Fall	Tserenbaataryn Tsogtbayar (MGL)
Elbrus Tedeyev (UKR)	0–10	Magomed Azizov (RUS)

=== Finals ===
	Score	
5th place match
Tserenbaataryn Tsogtbayar (MGL)	0–1 Ret	Elbrus Tedeyev (UKR)
Bronze medal match
Sergey Smal (BLR)	1–4	Magomed Azizov (RUS)
Final
Cary Kolat (USA)	2–4	Abbas Hajkenari (IRI)
