= 1999 World Wrestling Championships – Men's freestyle 63 kg =

Men's freestyle 63 kg at the 1999 World Championships
- Venue: Atatürk Sport Hall
- Dates: 7–9 October 1999
- Competitors: 36 from 36 nations

Medalists
gold medal	Elbrus Tedeyev	Ukraine
silver medal	Adkhamjon Achilov	South Korea
bronze medal	Ramil Islamov	Uzbekistan

The men's freestyle 63 kilograms is a competition featured at the 1999 World Wrestling Championships, and was held at the Atatürk Sport Hall in Ankara, Turkey from 7 to 9 October 1999.

== Results ==
=== Preliminary round ===
==== Pool 1 ====
Pos	Athlete	Pld	W	L	CP	TP	USA	RUS	GRE
1	Cary Kolat (USA)	2	2	0	7	22	—	9–6	13–0
2	Murad Umakhanov (RUS)	2	1	1	4	14	1–3 PP	—	8–1
3	Georgios Moustopoulos (GRE)	2	0	2	1	1	0–4 ST	1–3 PP	—

Source: Official website

==== Pool 2 ====
Pos	Athlete	Pld	W	L	CP	TP	GBR	BLR	FRA
1	John Melling (GBR)	2	2	0	6	12	—	9–8	3–1
2	Sergey Smal (BLR)	2	1	1	5	18	1–3 PP	—	10–0
3	Karim Makhlouf (FRA)	2	0	2	1	1	1–3 PP	0–4 ST	—

Source: Official website

==== Pool 3 ====
Pos	Athlete	Pld	W	L	CP	TP	ITA	ROM	MKD
1	Giovanni Schillaci (ITA)	2	2	0	6	8	—	3–2	5–2
2	Șerban Mumjiev (ROM)	2	1	1	4	8	1–3 PP	—	6–1
3	Lulzim Vrenezi (MKD)	2	0	2	2	3	1–3 PP	1–3 PP	—

Source: Official website

==== Pool 4 ====
Pos	Athlete	Pld	W	L	CP	TP	KGZ	FIN	IND
1	Maksat Boburbekov (KGZ)	2	2	0	8	18	—	10–0 Fall	8–0 Fall
2	Kim-Jussi Nurmela (FIN)	2	1	1	3	5	0–4 TO	—	5–4
3	Mukesh Kumar (IND)	2	0	2	1	4	0–4 TO	1–3 PP	—

Source: Official website

==== Pool 5 ====
Pos	Athlete	Pld	W	L	CP	TP	UKR	PRK	CYP
1	Elbrus Tedeyev (UKR)	2	2	0	8	15	—	12–1	3–0 Fall
2	Kim Kwang-il (PRK)	2	1	1	5	22	1–4 SP	—	21–0 Fall
3	Arout Parsekian (CYP)	2	0	2	0	0	0–4 TO	0–4 TO	—

Source: Official website

==== Pool 6 ====
Pos	Athlete	Pld	W	L	CP	TP	MDA	MGL	HUN
1	Ruslan Bodișteanu (MDA)	2	2	0	6	17	—	5–1	12–4
2	Tserenbaataryn Tsogtbayar (MGL)	2	1	1	5	11	1–3 PP	—	10–0
3	István Dencsik (HUN)	2	0	2	1	4	1–3 PP	0–4 ST	—

Source: Official website

==== Pool 7 ====
Pos	Athlete	Pld	W	L	CP	TP	BUL	CUB	CAN
1	Serafim Barzakov (BUL)	2	2	0	7	13	—	3–1 Fall	10–3
2	Carlos Ortiz (CUB)	2	1	1	3	10	0–4 TO	—	9–5
3	Marty Calder (CAN)	2	0	2	2	8	1–3 PP	1–3 PP	—

Source: Official website

==== Pool 8 ====
Pos	Athlete	Pld	W	L	CP	TP	POL	KOR	NED
1	Lucjan Gralak (POL)	2	2	0	6	12	—	6–4	6–0
2	Jang Jae-sung (KOR)	2	1	1	5	26	1–3 PP	—	22–1 Ret
3	Gocha Papashvili (NED)	2	0	2	0	1	0–3 PO	0–4 PA	—

Source: Official website

==== Pool 9 ====
Pos	Athlete	Pld	W	L	CP	TP	JPN	SYR	CHN
1	Hiroaki Yayama (JPN)	2	2	0	6	13	—	6–4	7–0
2	Ayman Al-Shalabi (SYR)	2	1	1	4	10	1–3 PP	—	6–5
3	Su Qing (CHN)	2	0	2	1	5	0–3 PO	1–3 PP	—

Source: Official website

==== Pool 10 ====
Pos	Athlete	Pld	W	L	CP	TP	UZB	SUI	MEX
1	Ramil Islamov (UZB)	2	2	0	6	16	—	9–1	7–0
2	Grégory Sarrasin (SUI)	2	1	1	4	5	1–3 PP	—	4–3
3	Celso de Anda (MEX)	2	0	2	1	3	0–3 PO	1–3 PP	—

Source: Official website

==== Pool 11 ====
Pos	Athlete	Pld	W	L	CP	TP	IRI	GEO	TUR
1	Mohammad Talaei (IRI)	2	2	0	6	8	—	5–3	3–0
2	David Pogosian (GEO)	2	1	1	4	10	1–3 PP	—	7–3
3	Mehmet Yozgat (TUR)	2	0	2	1	3	0–3 PO	1–3 PP	—

Source: Official website

==== Pool 12 ====
Pos	Athlete	Pld	W	L	CP	TP	AZE	KAZ	GER
1	Elman Asgarov (AZE)	2	2	0	7	24	—	14–9	10–0
2	Ismail Boziyev (KAZ)	2	1	1	4	15	1–3 PP	—	6–2
3	Jürgen Scheibe (GER)	2	0	2	1	2	0–4 ST	1–3 PP	—

Source: Official website

=== Knockout round ===
Round of 16
Cary Kolat (USA)	6
John Melling (GBR)	4
Giovanni Schillaci (ITA)	1
Maksat Boburbekov (KGZ)	7
Elbrus Tedeyev (UKR)	6
Ruslan Bodișteanu (MDA)	0
Serafim Barzakov (BUL)	5
Lucjan Gralak (POL)	0
Hiroaki Yayama (JPN)	0
Ramil Islamov (UZB)	7
Mohammad Talaei (IRI)	3
Elman Asgarov (AZE)	2
Sergey Smal (BLR)	2
Kim Kwang-il (PRK)	6
Tserenbaataryn Tsogtbayar (MGL)	0
Jang Jae-sung (KOR)	10

Quarterfinals
Cary Kolat (USA)	3
Maksat Boburbekov (KGZ)	1
Elbrus Tedeyev (UKR)	5
Serafim Barzakov (BUL)	3
Ramil Islamov (UZB)	3
Mohammad Talaei (IRI)	2
Kim Kwang-il (PRK)	1
Jang Jae-sung (KOR)	6

Semifinals
Cary Kolat (USA)	1
Elbrus Tedeyev (UKR)	2
Ramil Islamov (UZB)	0
Jang Jae-sung (KOR)	1

Final
Elbrus Tedeyev (UKR)	3
Jang Jae-sung (KOR)	1
Bronze medal match
Cary Kolat (USA)	0
Ramil Islamov (UZB)	5
