= Wrestling at the 1996 Summer Olympics – Men's freestyle 62 kg =

Men's freestyle 62 kg at the Games of the XXVI Olympiad
- Venue: Georgia World Congress Center
- Dates: 31 July – 1 August 1996
- Competitors: 21 from 21 nations

Medalists
| 1st place, gold medalist(s) | | Tom Brands | United States |
| 2nd place, silver medalist(s) | | Jang Jae-sung | South Korea |
| 3rd place, bronze medalist(s) | | Elbrus Tedeyev | Ukraine |

The men's freestyle 62 kilograms at the 1996 Summer Olympics as part of the wrestling program were held at the Georgia World Congress Center from July 31 to August 1. The gold and silver medalists were determined by the final match of the main single-elimination bracket. The losers advanced to the repechage. These matches determined the bronze medalist for the event.

== Results ==
Legend

- WO — Won by walkover

=== Round 1 ===
| | Score | | CP |
1/16 finals
| Takahiro Wada (JPN) | 11–0 | Șerban Mumjiev (ROM) | 4–0 ST |
| Enrique Cubas (PER) | 7–7 | Jan Krzesiak (POL) | 3–1 PP |
| Arout Parsekian (CYP) | 2–5 | Jang Jae-sung (KOR) | 1–3 PP |
| Tjaart du Plessis (RSA) | 1–5 | Elbrus Tedeyev (UKR) | 1–3 PP |
| István Demeter (HUN) | 3–0 | Anibál Nieves (PUR) | 3–0 PO |
| Abbas Hajkenari (IRI) | 0–3 | Tom Brands (USA) | 0–3 PO |
| Martin Müller (SUI) | 0–6 | Sergey Smal (BLR) | 0–3 PO |
| Marty Calder (CAN) | 2–4 | Jürgen Scheibe (GER) | 1–3 PP |
| Magomed Azizov (RUS) | 10–0 | Vath Chamroeun (CAM) | 4–0 ST |
| Giovanni Schillaci (ITA) | 10–0 | Leonid Zaslavsky (AUS) | 4–0 ST |
| Ramil Islamov (UZB) | | Bye | |

=== Round 2 ===
| | Score | | CP |
1/8 finals
| Ramil Islamov (UZB) | 2–3 | Takahiro Wada (JPN) | 1–3 PP |
| Enrique Cubas (PER) | 0–3 | Jang Jae-sung (KOR) | 0–3 PO |
| Elbrus Tedeyev (UKR) | 11–1 | István Demeter (HUN) | 4–1 SP |
| Tom Brands (USA) | 5–0 | Sergey Smal (BLR) | 3–0 PO |
| Jürgen Scheibe (GER) | 2–8 | Magomed Azizov (RUS) | 1–3 PP |
| Giovanni Schillaci (ITA) | | Bye | |
Repechage
| Șerban Mumjiev (ROM) | 12–1 | Jan Krzesiak (POL) | 4–1 SP |
| Arout Parsekian (CYP) | 3–1 | Tjaart du Plessis (RSA) | 3–1 PP |
| Anibál Nieves (PUR) | 8–3 | Abbas Hajkenari (IRI) | 3–1 PP |
| Martin Müller (SUI) | 0–6 | Marty Calder (CAN) | 0–3 PO |
| Vath Chamroeun (CAM) | 0–9 Fall | Leonid Zaslavsky (AUS) | 0–4 TO |

=== Round 3 ===
| | Score | | CP |
Quarterfinals
| Giovanni Schillaci (ITA) | 4–3 | Takahiro Wada (JPN) | 3–1 PP |
| Jang Jae-sung (KOR) | 3–1 | Elbrus Tedeyev (UKR) | 3–1 PP |
| Tom Brands (USA) | | Bye | |
| Magomed Azizov (RUS) | | Bye | |
Repechage
| Șerban Mumjiev (ROM) | 2–7 | Arout Parsekian (CYP) | 1–3 PP |
| Anibál Nieves (PUR) | 0–3 | Marty Calder (CAN) | 0–3 PO |
| Leonid Zaslavsky (AUS) | 0–10 | Ramil Islamov (UZB) | 0–4 ST |
| Enrique Cubas (PER) | 1–11 | István Demeter (HUN) | 1–4 SP |
| Sergey Smal (BLR) | 8–1 | Jürgen Scheibe (GER) | 3–1 PP |

=== Round 4 ===
| | Score | | CP |
Semifinals
| Giovanni Schillaci (ITA) | 1–1 | Jang Jae-sung (KOR) | 1–3 PP |
| Tom Brands (USA) | 4–1 | Magomed Azizov (RUS) | 3–1 PP |
Repechage
| Arout Parsekian (CYP) | 4–10 | Marty Calder (CAN) | 1–3 PP |
| Ramil Islamov (UZB) | 6–1 | István Demeter (HUN) | 3–1 PP |
| Sergey Smal (BLR) | 0–3 | Takahiro Wada (JPN) | 0–3 PO |
| Elbrus Tedeyev (UKR) | | Bye | |

=== Round 5 ===
| | Score | | CP |
Repechage
| Elbrus Tedeyev (UKR) | 5–4 | Ramil Islamov (UZB) | 3–1 PP |
| Marty Calder (CAN) | 3–7 | Takahiro Wada (JPN) | 1–3 PP |

=== Round 6 ===
| | Score | | CP |
Repechage
| Giovanni Schillaci (ITA) | 3–10 | Elbrus Tedeyev (UKR) | 1–3 PP |
| Takahiro Wada (JPN) | 10–0 | Magomed Azizov (RUS) | 4–0 ST |

=== Finals ===
| | Score | | CP |
Classification 7th–8th
| Ramil Islamov (UZB) | 1–9 | Marty Calder (CAN) | 1–3 PP |
Classification 5th–6th
| Giovanni Schillaci (ITA) | WO | Magomed Azizov (RUS) | 0–4 PA |
Bronze medal match
| Elbrus Tedeyev (UKR) | 3–1 | Takahiro Wada (JPN) | 3–1 PP |
Gold medal match
| Jang Jae-sung (KOR) | 0–7 | Tom Brands (USA) | 0–3 PO |

== Final standing ==
| Rank | Athlete |
|---|---|
| 1st place, gold medalist(s) | Tom Brands (USA) |
| 2nd place, silver medalist(s) | Jang Jae-sung (KOR) |
| 3rd place, bronze medalist(s) | Elbrus Tedeyev (UKR) |
| 4 | Takahiro Wada (JPN) |
| 5 | Magomed Azizov (RUS) |
| 6 | Giovanni Schillaci (ITA) |
| 7 | Marty Calder (CAN) |
| 8 | Ramil Islamov (UZB) |
| 9 | István Demeter (HUN) |
| 10 | Arout Parsekian (CYP) |
| 11 | Sergey Smal (BLR) |
| 12 | Șerban Mumjiev (ROM) |
| 13 | Jürgen Scheibe (GER) |
| 14 | Enrique Cubas (PER) |
| 15 | Leonid Zaslavsky (AUS) |
| 16 | Anibál Nieves (PUR) |
| 17 | Jan Krzesiak (POL) |
| 18 | Tjaart du Plessis (RSA) |
| 19 | Abbas Hajkenari (IRI) |
| 20 | Vath Chamroeun (CAM) |
| 20 | Martin Müller (SUI) |
