= 2002 World Wrestling Championships – Men's freestyle 66 kg =

Men's freestyle 66 kg at the 2002 World Championships
- Venue: Azadi Indoor Stadium
- Dates: 5–6 September 2002
- Competitors: 31 from 31 nations

Medalists
gold medal	Elbrus Tedeyev	Ukraine
silver medal	Alireza Dabir	Iran
bronze medal	Zaur Botaev	Russia

The men's freestyle 66 kilograms is a competition featured at the 2002 World Wrestling Championships, and was held at the Azadi Indoor Stadium in Tehran, Iran from 5 to 6 September 2002.

== Results ==
=== Preliminary round ===
==== Pool 1 ====
Pos	Athlete	Pld	W	L	CP	TP	GEO	ROM	FIN
1	Otar Tushishvili (GEO)	2	2	0	8	22	—	11–0	11–0
2	László Szabolcs (ROM)	2	1	1	3	8	0–4 ST	—	8–2
3	Jouni Rosenlöf (FIN)	2	0	2	1	2	0–4 ST	1–3 PP	—

Source: Official website

==== Pool 2 ====
Pos	Athlete	Pld	W	L	CP	TP	UKR	CUB	SUI
1	Elbrus Tedeyev (UKR)	2	2	0	6	9	—	3–0	6–0
2	Carlos Ortiz (CUB)	2	1	1	3	6	0–3 PO	—	6–0
3	Grégory Sarrasin (SUI)	2	0	2	0	0	0–3 PO	0–3 PO	—

Source: Official website

==== Pool 3 ====
Pos	Athlete	Pld	W	L	CP	TP	BUL	TUR	GRE
1	Serafim Barzakov (BUL)	2	2	0	6	15	—	9–0	6–1
2	Mehmet Yozgat (TUR)	2	1	1	3	3	0–3 PO	—	3–1
3	Aristos Alexandridis (GRE)	2	0	2	2	2	1–3 PP	1–3 PP	—

Source: Official website

==== Pool 4 ====
Pos	Athlete	Pld	W	L	CP	TP	MGL	BLR	SVK
1	Norjingiin Bayarmagnai (MGL)	2	2	0	6	9	—	6–3	3–0
2	Mikalai Savin (BLR)	2	1	1	4	7	1–3 PP	—	4–0
3	Štefan Fernyák (SVK)	2	0	2	0	0	0–3 PO	0–3 PO	—

Source: Official website

==== Pool 5 ====
Pos	Athlete	Pld	W	L	CP	TP	POL	ARM	TJK
1	Lucjan Gralak (POL)	2	2	0	6	7	—	3–2	4–0
2	Arshak Hayrapetyan (ARM)	2	1	1	5	12	1–3 PP	—	10–0
3	Eradj Davlatov (TJK)	2	0	2	0	0	0–3 PO	0–4 ST	—

Source: Official website

==== Pool 6 ====
Pos	Athlete	Pld	W	L	CP	TP	GER	AZE	TKM
1	Engin Ürün (GER)	2	2	0	6	8	—	4–1	4–1
2	Elman Asgarov (AZE)	2	1	1	5	12	1–3 PP	—	11–0
3	Annadurdy Wepamyradow (TKM)	2	0	2	1	1	1–3 PP	0–4 ST	—

Source: Official website

==== Pool 7 ====
Pos	Athlete	Pld	W	L	CP	TP	UKR	KGZ	NED
1	Zaur Botaev (RUS)	2	2	0	8	10	—	2–0 Fall	8–0 Fall
2	Jamso Lkhamajapov (KGZ)	2	1	1	4	4	0–4 TO	—	4–0 Fall
3	Yousef Nassiri (NED)	2	0	2	0	0	0–4 TO	0–4 TO	—

Source: Official website

==== Pool 8 ====
Pos	Athlete	Pld	W	L	CP	TP	KOR	MKD	IND
1	Jang Jae-sung (KOR)	2	2	0	6	12	—	6–1	6–0
2	Lulzim Vrenezi (MKD)	2	1	1	5	6	1–3 PP	—	5–0 Fall
3	Jai Bhagwan (IND)	2	0	2	0	0	0–3 PO	0–4 TO	—

Source: Official website

==== Pool 9 ====
Pos	Athlete	Pld	W	L	CP	TP	IRI	JPN	CHN
1	Alireza Dabir (IRI)	2	2	0	6	15	—	6–4	9–2
2	Kazuhiko Ikematsu (JPN)	2	1	1	4	11	1–3 PP	—	7–0
3	Li Quan (CHN)	2	0	2	1	2	1–3 PP	0–3 PO	—

Source: Official website

==== Pool 10 ====
Pos	Athlete	Pld	W	L	CP	TP	CAN	MDA	EST	FRA
1	Neal Ewers (CAN)	3	3	0	10	23	—	4–1	9–1	10–0
2	Ruslan Bodișteanu (MDA)	3	2	1	8	17	1–3 PP	—	5–0	11–0
3	Ahto Raska (EST)	3	1	2	4	5	1–3 PP	0–3 PO	—	4–2
4	Ibrahim Selloum (FRA)	3	0	3	1	2	0–4 ST	0–4 ST	1–3 PP	—

Source: Official website

=== Knockout round ===
Round of 16
Otar Tushishvili (GEO)	3
Elbrus Tedeyev (UKR)	7
Serafim Barzakov (BUL)	10
Norjingiin Bayarmagnai (MGL)	0

Quarterfinals
Elbrus Tedeyev (UKR)	4
Serafim Barzakov (BUL)	3
Lucjan Gralak (POL)	2
Engin Ürün (GER)	4
Zaur Botaev (RUS)	3
Jang Jae-sung (KOR)	2
Alireza Dabir (IRI)	4
Neal Ewers (CAN)	1

Semifinals
Elbrus Tedeyev (UKR)	4
Engin Ürün (GER)	0
Zaur Botaev (RUS)	1
Alireza Dabir (IRI)	2

Final
Elbrus Tedeyev (UKR)	5
Alireza Dabir (IRI)	4
Bronze medal match
Engin Ürün (GER)	0
Zaur Botaev (RUS)	3
