= Wrestling at the 2000 Summer Olympics – Men's freestyle 63 kg =

Men's freestyle 63 kg at the Games of the XXVII Olympiad
- Venue: Sydney Convention and Exhibition Centre
- Date: 28–30 September 2000
- Competitors: 19 from 19 nations

Medalists
1st place, gold medalist(s)		Murad Umakhanov	Russia
2nd place, silver medalist(s)		Serafim Barzakov	Bulgaria
3rd place, bronze medalist(s)		Jang Jae-sung	South Korea

The men's freestyle 63 kilograms at the 2000 Summer Olympics as part of the wrestling program was held at the Sydney Convention and Exhibition Centre from September 28 to 30. The competition held with an elimination system of three or four wrestlers in each pool, with the winners qualify for the quarterfinals, semifinals and final by way of direct elimination.

== Schedule ==
All times are Australian Eastern Daylight Time (UTC+11:00)

Date	Time	Event
28 September 2000	09:30	Round 1
28 September 2000	09:30	Round 2
28 September 2000	17:00	Round 3
29 September 2000	09:30	Quarterfinals
29 September 2000	17:00	Semifinals
30 September 2000	17:00	Finals

== Results ==
Legend

- WO — Won by walkover

=== Elimination pools ===
==== Pool 1 ====
Pos	Athlete	Pld	W	L	CP	TP	Qualification
1	Serafim Barzakov (BUL)	2	2	0	6	7	Knockout round
2	Ruslan Bodișteanu (MDA)	2	1	1	5	11	
3	Jürgen Scheibe (GER)	2	0	2	0	0	

Source: Official Report

	Score		CP
Jürgen Scheibe (GER)	0–3	Serafim Barzakov (BUL)	0–3 PO
Ruslan Bodișteanu (MDA)	10–0	Jürgen Scheibe (GER)	4–0 ST
Serafim Barzakov (BUL)	4–1	Ruslan Bodișteanu (MDA)	3–1 PP

==== Pool 2 ====
Pos	Athlete	Pld	W	L	CP	TP	Qualification
1	Carlos Ortiz (CUB)	2	2	0	6	10	Knockout round
2	Kazuyuki Miyata (JPN)	2	1	1	4	5	
3	Otar Tushishvili (GEO)	2	0	2	2	4	

Source: Official Report

	Score		CP
Otar Tushishvili (GEO)	1–6	Carlos Ortiz (CUB)	1–3 PP
Kazuyuki Miyata (JPN)	4–3	Otar Tushishvili (GEO)	3–1 PP
Carlos Ortiz (CUB)	4–1	Kazuyuki Miyata (JPN)	3–1 PP

==== Pool 3 ====
Pos	Athlete	Pld	W	L	CP	TP	Qualification
1	Mohammad Talaei (IRI)	2	2	0	7	5	Knockout round
2	Cary Kolat (USA)	2	1	1	5	10	
3	Ramil Islamov (UZB)	2	0	2	0	2	

Source: Official Report

	Score		CP
Cary Kolat (USA)	4–5	Mohammad Talaei (IRI)	1–3 PP
Ramil Islamov (UZB)	2–6 Fall	Cary Kolat (USA)	0–4 TO
Mohammad Talaei (IRI)	WO	Ramil Islamov (UZB)	4–0 PA

==== Pool 4 ====
Pos	Athlete	Pld	W	L	CP	TP	Qualification
1	Arshak Hayrapetyan (ARM)	2	2	0	6	13	Knockout round
2	Mikalai Savin (BLR)	2	1	1	4	8	
3	Maksat Boburbekov (KGZ)	2	0	2	2	3	

Source: Official Report

	Score		CP
Arshak Hayrapetyan (ARM)	6–2	Maksat Boburbekov (KGZ)	3–1 PP
Mikalai Savin (BLR)	4–7	Arshak Hayrapetyan (ARM)	1–3 PP
Maksat Boburbekov (KGZ)	1–4	Mikalai Savin (BLR)	1–3 PP

==== Pool 5 ====
Pos	Athlete	Pld	W	L	CP	TP	Qualification
1	Murad Umakhanov (RUS)	2	2	0	7	22	Knockout round
2	Elbrus Tedeyev (UKR)	2	1	1	4	9	
3	Jo Yong-son (PRK)	2	0	2	2	6	

Source: Official Report

	Score		CP
Elbrus Tedeyev (UKR)	6–4	Jo Yong-son (PRK)	3–1 PP
Murad Umakhanov (RUS)	13–3	Elbrus Tedeyev (UKR)	4–1 SP
Jo Yong-son (PRK)	2–9	Murad Umakhanov (RUS)	1–3 PP

==== Pool 6 ====
Pos	Athlete	Pld	W	L	CP	TP	Qualification
1	Jang Jae-sung (KOR)	3	3	0	11	29	Knockout round
2	Shamil Afandiyev (AZE)	3	2	1	8	17	
3	Štefan Fernyák (SVK)	3	1	2	6	4	
4	Musa Ilhan (AUS)	3	0	3	0	0	

Source: Official Report

	Score		CP
Štefan Fernyák (SVK)	1–6	Shamil Afandiyev (AZE)	1–3 PP
Jang Jae-sung (KOR)	10–0	Musa Ilhan (AUS)	4–0 ST
Štefan Fernyák (SVK)	3–13	Jang Jae-sung (KOR)	1–4 SP
Shamil Afandiyev (AZE)	10–0	Musa Ilhan (AUS)	4–0 ST
Štefan Fernyák (SVK)	WO	Musa Ilhan (AUS)	4–0 PA
Shamil Afandiyev (AZE)	1–6	Jang Jae-sung (KOR)	1–3 PP

=== Knockout round ===
Quarterfinals
Serafim Barzakov (BUL)	4
Carlos Ortiz (CUB)	1
Mohammad Talaei (IRI)	3
Arshak Hayrapetyan (ARM)	2

Semifinals
Serafim Barzakov (BUL)	4
Mohammad Talaei (IRI)	0
Murad Umakhanov (RUS)	4
Jang Jae-sung (KOR)	4

Gold medal match
Serafim Barzakov (BUL)	2
Murad Umakhanov (RUS)	3
Bronze medal match
Mohammad Talaei (IRI)	2
Jang Jae-sung (KOR)	12

Classification 5th–6th
Carlos Ortiz (CUB)
Arshak Hayrapetyan (ARM)	WO

== Final standing ==
Rank	Athlete
1st place, gold medalist(s)	Murad Umakhanov (RUS)
2nd place, silver medalist(s)	Serafim Barzakov (BUL)
3rd place, bronze medalist(s)	Jang Jae-sung (KOR)
4	Mohammad Talaei (IRI)
5	Arshak Hayrapetyan (ARM)
6	Carlos Ortiz (CUB)
7	Shamil Afandiyev (AZE)
8	Štefan Fernyák (SVK)
9	Cary Kolat (USA)
10	Ruslan Bodișteanu (MDA)
11	Elbrus Tedeyev (UKR)
12	Mikalai Savin (BLR)
13	Kazuyuki Miyata (JPN)
14	Jo Yong-son (PRK)
15	Otar Tushishvili (GEO)
16	Maksat Boburbekov (KGZ)
17	Ramil Islamov (UZB)
18	Musa Ilhan (AUS)
19	Jürgen Scheibe (GER)
