= 2001 World Wrestling Championships – Men's freestyle 63 kg =

Men's freestyle 63 kg at the 2001 World Championships
- Venue: Winter Sports Palace
- Dates: 22–24 November 2001
- Competitors: 31 from 31 nations

Medalists
gold medal	Serafim Barzakov	Bulgaria
silver medal	Alireza Dabir	Iran
bronze medal	Elbrus Tedeyev	Ukraine

The men's freestyle 63 kilograms is a competition featured at the 2001 World Wrestling Championships, and was held at the Winter Sports Palace in Sofia, Bulgaria from 22 to 24 November 2001.

== Results ==
Legend

- WO — Won by walkover

=== Preliminary round ===
==== Pool 1 ====
Pos	Athlete	Pld	W	L	CP	TP	BUL	MKD	CUB
1	Serafim Barzakov (BUL)	2	1	1	4	10	—	10–0	0–4
2	Koce Nikolov (MKD)	2	1	1	4	5	0–4 ST	—	5–1 Fall
3	Carlos Ortiz (CUB)	2	1	1	3	5	3–0 PO	0–4 TO	—

Source: Official website

==== Pool 2 ====
Pos	Athlete	Pld	W	L	CP	TP	GRE	EGY	RUS
1	Aristos Alexandridis (GRE)	2	2	0	6	14	—	11–6	3–2
2	Hassan Madani (EGY)	2	1	1	5	6	1–3 PP	—	WO
3	Soslan Tomaev (RUS)	2	0	2	1	2	1–3 PP	0–4 PA	—

Source: Official website

==== Pool 3 ====
Pos	Athlete	Pld	W	L	CP	TP	KOR	KAZ	HUN
1	Baek Jin-kuk (KOR)	2	2	0	7	18	—	10–0	8–1
2	Iossif Momtselidze (KAZ)	2	1	1	4	15	0–4 ST	—	15–8 Fall
3	István Dencsik (HUN)	2	0	2	1	9	1–3 PP	0–4 TO	—

Source: Official website

==== Pool 4 ====
Pos	Athlete	Pld	W	L	CP	TP	GEO	SUI	GER
1	Otar Tushishvili (GEO)	2	2	0	7	20	—	11–0	9–0
2	Grégory Sarrasin (SUI)	2	1	1	3	8	0–4 ST	—	8–7
3	Vahab Hanli (GER)	2	0	2	1	7	0–3 PO	1–3 PP	—

Source: Official website

==== Pool 5 ====
Pos	Athlete	Pld	W	L	CP	TP	UKR	KGZ	MGL
1	Elbrus Tedeyev (UKR)	2	2	0	7	13	—	10–0	3–0
2	Jamso Lkhamajapov (KGZ)	2	1	1	4	3	0–4 ST	—	3–2 Ret
3	Norjingiin Bayarmagnai (MGL)	2	0	2	0	2	0–3 PO	0–4 PA	—

Source: Official website

==== Pool 6 ====
Pos	Athlete	Pld	W	L	CP	TP	AZE	SVK	ESP
1	Elman Asgarov (AZE)	2	2	0	7	23	—	10–0	13–6
2	Vladimír Chamula (SVK)	2	1	1	4	7	0–4 ST	—	7–3 Fall
3	Rubén Díaz (ESP)	2	0	2	1	9	1–3 PP	0–4 TO	—

Source: Official website

==== Pool 7 ====
Pos	Athlete	Pld	W	L	CP	TP	POL	CAN	JPN
1	Lucjan Gralak (POL)	2	2	0	7	16	—	4–1	12–2
2	Nasir Lal (CAN)	2	1	1	4	7	1–3 PP	—	6–3
3	Kazuhiko Ikematsu (JPN)	2	0	2	2	5	1–4 SP	1–3 PP	—

Source: Official website

==== Pool 8 ====
Pos	Athlete	Pld	W	L	CP	TP	TUR	BLR	VIE
1	Mehmet Yozgat (TUR)	2	2	0	7	7	—	3–0	4–0 Fall
2	Mikalai Savin (BLR)	2	1	1	4	10	0–3 PO	—	10–0
3	Phí Hữu Sơn (VIE)	2	0	2	0	0	0–4 TO	0–4 ST	—

Source: Official website

==== Pool 9 ====
Pos	Athlete	Pld	W	L	CP	TP	USA	ARM	NED
1	Bill Zadick (USA)	2	2	0	7	16	—	5–3	11–0
2	Arshak Hayrapetyan (ARM)	2	1	1	5	13	1–3 PP	—	10–0
3	Yousef Nassiri (NED)	2	0	2	0	0	0–4 ST	0–4 ST	—

Source: Official website

==== Pool 10 ====
Pos	Athlete	Pld	W	L	CP	TP	IRI	MDA	IND	PER
1	Alireza Dabir (IRI)	3	3	0	11	24	—	4–3	10–0	10–0
2	Ruslan Bodișteanu (MDA)	3	2	1	9	24	1–3 PP	—	10–0	11–0
3	Pawan Kumar (IND)	3	1	2	4	11	0–4 ST	0–4 ST	—	11–1
4	José Paico (PER)	3	0	3	1	1	0–4 ST	0–4 ST	1–4 SP	—

Source: Official website

=== Knockout round ===
Round of 16
Serafim Barzakov (BUL)	3
Aristos Alexandridis (GRE)	0
Baek Jin-kuk (KOR)	2
Otar Tushishvili (GEO)	5

Quarterfinals
Serafim Barzakov (BUL)	WO
Otar Tushishvili (GEO)
Elbrus Tedeyev (UKR)	4
Elman Asgarov (AZE)	3
Lucjan Gralak (POL)	3
Mehmet Yozgat (TUR)	6
Bill Zadick (USA)	2
Alireza Dabir (IRI)	9

Semifinals
Serafim Barzakov (BUL)	5
Elbrus Tedeyev (UKR)	2
Mehmet Yozgat (TUR)	0
Alireza Dabir (IRI)	3

Final
Serafim Barzakov (BUL)	3
Alireza Dabir (IRI)	1
Bronze medal match
Elbrus Tedeyev (UKR)	4
Mehmet Yozgat (TUR)	0
