= Wrestling at the 1998 Asian Games – Men's freestyle 63 kg =

Men's freestyle 63 kg at the 1998 Asian Games
- Venue: Thammasat Gymnasium 1
- Dates: 16–17 December 1998
- Competitors: 13 from 13 nations

Medalists
gold medal	Jang Jae-sung	South Korea
silver medal	Ramil Islamov	Uzbekistan
bronze medal	Tserenbaataryn Tsogtbayar	Mongolia

The men's freestyle 63 kilograms wrestling competition at the 1998 Asian Games in Bangkok was held on 16 December and 17 December at the Thammasat Gymnasium 1.

The gold and silver medalists were determined by the final match of the main single-elimination bracket. The losers advanced to the repechage. These matches determined the bronze medalist for the event.

== Schedule ==
All times are Indochina Time (UTC+07:00)

Date	Time	Event
Wednesday, 16 December 1998	09:00	Round 1
Wednesday, 16 December 1998	16:00	Round 2
Wednesday, 16 December 1998	16:00	Round 3
Thursday, 17 December 1998	09:00	Round 4
Thursday, 17 December 1998	09:00	Round 5
Thursday, 17 December 1998	16:00	Finals

== Results ==
=== Round 1 ===
	Score		CP
1/8 finals
Berik Dengelbayev (KAZ)	0–8	Mehdi Kaveh (IRI)	0–3 PO
Surasak Ravipanick (THA)	2–12	Michael Baletin (PHI)	1–4 SP
Ramil Islamov (UZB)	6–3	Hiroaki Yayama (JPN)	3–1 PP
Zahid Khan (PAK)	0–10	Su Qing (CHN)	0–4 ST
Ayman Al-Shalabi (SYR)	3–7	Tserenbaataryn Tsogtbayar (MGL)	1–3 PP
Jang Jae-sung (KOR)	7–3	Mukesh Kumar (IND)	3–1 PP
Ruslanbek Madjinov (KGZ)		Bye	

=== Round 2 ===
	Score		CP
Quarterfinals
Ruslanbek Madjinov (KGZ)	3–4	Mehdi Kaveh (IRI)	1–3 PP
Michael Baletin (PHI)	0–11	Ramil Islamov (UZB)	0–4 ST
Su Qing (CHN)	3–10	Tserenbaataryn Tsogtbayar (MGL)	1–3 PP
Jang Jae-sung (KOR)		Bye	
Repechage
Berik Dengelbayev (KAZ)	11–0	Surasak Ravipanick (THA)	4–0 ST
Hiroaki Yayama (JPN)	13–1	Zahid Khan (PAK)	4–1 SP
Ayman Al-Shalabi (SYR)	0–3	Mukesh Kumar (IND)	0–3 PO

=== Round 3 ===
	Score		CP
Semifinals
Jang Jae-sung (KOR)	7–0	Mehdi Kaveh (IRI)	3–0 PO
Ramil Islamov (UZB)	3–0	Tserenbaataryn Tsogtbayar (MGL)	3–0 PO
Repechage
Berik Dengelbayev (KAZ)	0–1 Ret	Hiroaki Yayama (JPN)	0–4 PA
Mukesh Kumar (IND)	6–3	Ruslanbek Madjinov (KGZ)	3–1 PP
Michael Baletin (PHI)	1–13	Su Qing (CHN)	1–4 SP

=== Round 4 ===
	Score		CP
Repechage
Hiroaki Yayama (JPN)	3–4	Mukesh Kumar (IND)	1–3 PP
Su Qing (CHN)		Bye	

=== Round 5 ===
	Score		CP
Repechage
Mehdi Kaveh (IRI)	2–3	Su Qing (CHN)	1–3 PP
Mukesh Kumar (IND)	2–4	Tserenbaataryn Tsogtbayar (MGL)	1–3 PP

=== Finals ===
	Score		CP
Bronze medal match
Su Qing (CHN)	0–5	Tserenbaataryn Tsogtbayar (MGL)	0–3 PO
Gold medal match
Jang Jae-sung (KOR)	3–2	Ramil Islamov (UZB)	3–1 PP

== Final standing ==
Rank	Athlete
1st place, gold medalist(s)	Jang Jae-sung (KOR)
2nd place, silver medalist(s)	Ramil Islamov (UZB)
3rd place, bronze medalist(s)	Tserenbaataryn Tsogtbayar (MGL)
4	Su Qing (CHN)
5	Mukesh Kumar (IND)
6	Mehdi Kaveh (IRI)
7	Hiroaki Yayama (JPN)
8	Michael Baletin (PHI)
9	Berik Dengelbayev (KAZ)
10	Ruslanbek Madjinov (KGZ)
11	Ayman Al-Shalabi (SYR)
12	Zahid Khan (PAK)
13	Surasak Ravipanick (THA)
