= Pakistan at the 1992 Summer Olympics =

- IOC code: PAK
- NOC: National Olympic Committee of Pakistan
- Website: www.nocpakistan.org

in Barcelona
- Competitors: 27 in 5 sports
- Flag bearer: Shahbaz Ahmed
- Medals Ranked 54th: Gold 0 Silver 0 Bronze 1 Total 1

Summer Olympics appearances (overview)
- 1948; 1952; 1956; 1960; 1964; 1968; 1972; 1976; 1980; 1984; 1988; 1992; 1996; 2000; 2004; 2008; 2012; 2016; 2020; 2024

Pakistan competed at the 1992 Summer Olympics in Barcelona, Spain.

== Medalists ==
Medal	Name	Sport	Event	Date
Bronze	Pakistan men's national field hockey team: Mansoor Ahmed; Muhammad Akhlaq Ahmed; Shahbaz Ahmed; Asif Bajwa; Khalid Bashir; Wasim Feroz; Musaddiq Hussain; Muhammad Qamar Ibrahim; Khawaja Junaid; Muhammad Khalid; Farhat Hassan Khan; Shahid Ali Khan; Rana Mujahid Ali; Anjum Saeed; Muhammad Shahbaz; Tahir Zaman	Field hockey	Men's tournament	8 August

Medals by sport
Sport	Gold	Silver	Bronze	Total
Field hockey	0	0	1	1
Total	0	0	1	1

== Competitors ==
The following is the list of number of competitors in the Games.

Sport	Men	Women	Total
Athletics	4	0	4
Boxing	4	–	4
Field hockey	16	0	16
Sailing	2	0	2
Wrestling	1	–	1
Total	27	0	27

== Results by event ==
=== Athletics ===
Men's 100m metres

- Arif Hussain

- Heat 3 round 1; 10.83 (→ did not advance)

Men's 200 metres

- Arif Hussain

- Heat 10 round 1; 21.75 (→ did not advance)

Men's 1,500 metres

- Nadir Khan

- Heat 2 round 1; 3:44.96 (→ did not advance)

Men's 400 metres hurdles

- Ghulam Abbas

- Heat 3 round 1; 50.57 (→ did not advance)

Men's triple jump

- Banaras Khan

- Qualifying heat 1; 15.37m (→ did not advance, finished 21st out of 21 in heat)

=== Boxing ===
Men's welterweight

- Khyber Shah

- Round 1; Lost to Mario Antonio Romero (NCA) on pts 7:2

Men's light middleweight

- Syed Abrar Hussain

- Round 1; Lost to Noureddine Meziane (ALG) on pts 7:0

Men's light heavyweight

- Mohammad Asghar

- Round 1; Walkover against Ali Kazemi (IRN)
- Round 2; Lost to Zoltán Béres (HUN) RSC in 1st rd

Men's lightweight

- Hussain Arshad

- Round 1; Lost to Henry Kungsi (PNG) on pts 13:9

=== Field Hockey ===
==== Men's team competition ====
Preliminary round Group B

- Defeated Malaysia (4-1)
- Defeated New Zealand (1-0)
- Defeated Unified Team (6-2)
- Defeated Netherlands (3-2)
- Defeated Spain (6-1)

Semifinals

- Lost to Germany (1-2)

Place 3rd-4th

- Defeated Netherlands (4-3)

Pakistan won the bronze medal

Team Roster

- Shahbaz Ahmed (captain)
- Wasim Feroz (vice-captain)
- Mansoor Ahmed (gk)
- Shahid Ali Khan (gk)
- Rana Mujahid
- Khalid Bashir
- Anjum Saeed
- Farhat Khan
- Khawaja Junaid
- Qamar Ibrahim
- Tahir Zaman
- Asif Bajawa
- Yasser H Khan
- Mohammad Akhlaq
- Mohammad Khalid Sr
- Musaddiq Hussain
- Mohammad Shahbaz

=== Wrestling ===
Men's up to 57 kg

- Naseer Ahmed

- Elimination B 1st round; Lost to Keiji Okuyama (JPN) on pts 5:0
- Elimination B 2nd round; Lost to Alejandro Puerto Diaz (CUB) on pts 6:0
