= Tazagyukh =

Tazagyukh may refer to:

- Tazagyukh, Ararat, Armenia
- Tazagyugh, Gegharkunik, Armenia
- Nor Gyugh, Armenia
- Tasik, Armenia
- Tavshut, Armenia
