= Wrestling at the 1992 Summer Olympics – Men's freestyle 57 kg =

Men's freestyle 57 kg at the Games of the XXV Olympiad
- Venue: Institut Nacional d'Educació Física de Catalunya
- Dates: 5–7 August 1992
- Competitors: 18 from 18 nations

Medalists
1st place, gold medalist(s)		Alejandro Puerto	Cuba
2nd place, silver medalist(s)		Sergey Smal	Unified Team
3rd place, bronze medalist(s)		Kim Yong-sik	North Korea

The men's freestyle 57 kilograms at the 1992 Summer Olympics as part of the wrestling program were held at the Institut Nacional d'Educació Física de Catalunya from August 5 to August 7. The wrestlers are divided into 2 groups. The winner of each group decided by a double-elimination system.

== Results ==
Legend

- WO — Won by walkover

=== Elimination A ===
==== Round 1 ====
	Score		CP
Kim Chun-ho (KOR)	2–12	Kim Yong-sik (PRK)	1–3 PP
Sergey Smal (EUN)	6–5	Tserenbaataryn Tsogtbayar (MGL)	3–1 PP
Béla Nagy (HUN)	5–1 Fall	Tebe Dorgu (NGR)	4–0 TO
Jürgen Scheibe (GER)	6–2	Zoran Šorov (IOP)	3–1 PP
Rumen Pavlov (BUL)		Bye	

==== Round 2 ====
	Score		CP
Rumen Pavlov (BUL)	8–4 Fall	Kim Chun-ho (KOR)	4–0 TO
Kim Yong-sik (PRK)	2–4	Sergey Smal (EUN)	1–3 PP
Tserenbaataryn Tsogtbayar (MGL)	25–9	Béla Nagy (HUN)	4–0 ST
Tebe Dorgu (NGR)	0–5 Fall	Jürgen Scheibe (GER)	0–4 TO
Zoran Šorov (IOP)		Bye	

==== Round 3 ====
	Score		CP
Zoran Šorov (IOP)	2–10 Fall	Rumen Pavlov (BUL)	0–4 TO
Kim Yong-sik (PRK)	10–5	Tserenbaataryn Tsogtbayar (MGL)	3–1 PP
Sergey Smal (EUN)	13–0	Béla Nagy (HUN)	3.5–0 SO
Jürgen Scheibe (GER)		Bye	

==== Round 4 ====
	Score		CP
Jürgen Scheibe (GER)	0–5	Kim Yong-sik (PRK)	0–3 PO
Rumen Pavlov (BUL)	1–12	Sergey Smal (EUN)	1–3 PP

==== Round 5 ====
	Score		CP
Jürgen Scheibe (GER)	0–6	Sergey Smal (EUN)	0–3 PO
Rumen Pavlov (BUL)	3–10	Kim Yong-sik (PRK)	1–3 PP

==== Summary ====
Pos	Athlete	Pld	W	L	R	CP	TP
1	Sergey Smal (EUN)	5	5	0	X (Note: EUN 3–1 PRK)	15.5	41
2	Kim Yong-sik (PRK)	5	4	1	X	13	39
3	Rumen Pavlov (BUL)	4	2	2	5	10	22
4	Jürgen Scheibe (GER)	4	2	2	5	7	11
5	Tserenbaataryn Tsogtbayar (MGL)	3	1	2	3	6	35
—	Béla Nagy (HUN)	3	1	2	3	4	14
—	Zoran Šorov (IOP)	2	0	2	3	1	4
—	Kim Chun-ho (KOR)	2	0	2	2	1	6
—	Tebe Dorgu (NGR)	2	0	2	2	0	1

Source: Official Report

=== Elimination B ===
==== Round 1 ====
	Score		CP
Naseer Ahmed (PAK)	0–5	Keiji Okuyama (JPN)	0–3 PO
Kendall Cross (USA)	3–2	Robert Dawson (CAN)	3–1 PP
Oveis Mallah (IRI)	6–2	Ashok Kumar Garg (IND)	3–1 PP
Remzi Musaoğlu (TUR)	16–0	Andrés Iniesta (ESP)	4–0 ST
Alejandro Puerto (CUB)		Bye	

==== Round 2 ====
	Score		CP
Alejandro Puerto (CUB)	6–0	Naseer Ahmed (PAK)	3–0 PO
Keiji Okuyama (JPN)	0–5 Fall	Kendall Cross (USA)	0–4 TO
Robert Dawson (CAN)	5–1	Oveis Mallah (IRI)	3–1 PP
Ashok Kumar Garg (IND)	0–7	Remzi Musaoğlu (TUR)	0–3 PO
Andrés Iniesta (ESP)		Bye	

==== Round 3 ====
	Score		CP
Andrés Iniesta (ESP)	0–8	Alejandro Puerto (CUB)	0–3 PO
Keiji Okuyama (JPN)	3–4	Robert Dawson (CAN)	1–3 PP
Kendall Cross (USA)	5–3	Oveis Mallah (IRI)	3–1 PP
Remzi Musaoğlu (TUR)		Bye	

==== Round 4 ====
	Score		CP
Remzi Musaoğlu (TUR)	7–3	Kendall Cross (USA)	3–1 PP
Alejandro Puerto (CUB)	1–0	Robert Dawson (CAN)	3–0 PO

==== Round 5 ====
	Score		CP
Remzi Musaoğlu (TUR)	0–3	Alejandro Puerto (CUB)	0–3 PO
Kendall Cross (USA)		Bye	

==== Round 6 ====
	Score		CP
Kendall Cross (USA)	6–10	Alejandro Puerto (CUB)	1–3 PP
Remzi Musaoğlu (TUR)		Bye	

==== Summary ====
Pos	Athlete	Pld	W	L	R	CP	TP
1	Alejandro Puerto (CUB)	6	6	0	X (Note: Classification points: CUB 6, TUR 3, USA 2)	15	28
2	Remzi Musaoğlu (TUR)	4	3	1	X	10	30
3	Kendall Cross (USA)	4	2	2	X	12	22
4	Robert Dawson (CAN)	4	2	2	4	7	11
5	Oveis Mallah (IRI)	3	1	2	3	5	10
—	Keiji Okuyama (JPN)	3	1	2	3	4	8
—	Andrés Iniesta (ESP)	2	0	2	3	0	0
—	Ashok Kumar Garg (IND)	2	0	2	2	1	2
—	Naseer Ahmed (PAK)	2	0	2	2	0	0

Source: Official Report

=== Finals ===
	Score		CP
9th place match
Tserenbaataryn Tsogtbayar (MGL)	WO	Oveis Mallah (IRI)	0–4 PA
7th place match
Jürgen Scheibe (GER)	WO	Robert Dawson (CAN)	4–0 PA
5th place match
Rumen Pavlov (BUL)	3–0 Fall	Kendall Cross (USA)	4–0 TO
Bronze medal match
Kim Yong-sik (PRK)	3–2	Remzi Musaoğlu (TUR)	3–1 PP
Gold medal match
Sergey Smal (EUN)	0–5	Alejandro Puerto (CUB)	0–3 PO

== Final standing ==
Rank	Athlete
1st place, gold medalist(s)	Alejandro Puerto (CUB)
2nd place, silver medalist(s)	Sergey Smal (EUN)
3rd place, bronze medalist(s)	Kim Yong-sik (PRK)
4	Remzi Musaoğlu (TUR)
5	Rumen Pavlov (BUL)
6	Kendall Cross (USA)
7	Jürgen Scheibe (GER)
8	Robert Dawson (CAN)
9	Oveis Mallah (IRI)
10	Tserenbaataryn Tsogtbayar (MGL)
