= Vath =

Vath (Väth, Vaeth) is a surname and male given name. Notable people with this surname include:

- Joseph Gregory Vath (1918–1987), American bishop
- Sven Väth (born 1964), German DJ/producer
- Vath Chamroeun (born 1972), Cambodian wrestler
- Vath Koreshi (1936–2006), Albanian writer and screenwriter
- Vath Sarn, character in Green Lanterns
