= Campbell Fighting Camels =

Sports teams of Campbell University

- University: Campbell University
- Nickname: Fighting Camels
- NCAA: Division I (FCS)
- Conference: CAA (primary); SoCon (wrestling)
- Athletic director: Corey Jenkins
- Location: Buies Creek, North Carolina
- Varsity teams: 21 (10 men's, 11 women's)
- Football stadium: Barker–Lane Stadium
- Basketball arena: Gore Arena/Pope Convocation Center
- Baseball stadium: Jim Perry Stadium
- Softball stadium: Amanda Littlejohn Stadium
- Soccer stadium: Eakes Athletics Complex
- Aquatics center: Johnson Aquatic Center
- Tennis venue: Nisbet Tennis Center
- Colors: Black and orange
- Mascot: Gaylord the Camel; Gladys the Camel
- Fight song: Campbell University Fight Song
- Website: gocamels.com
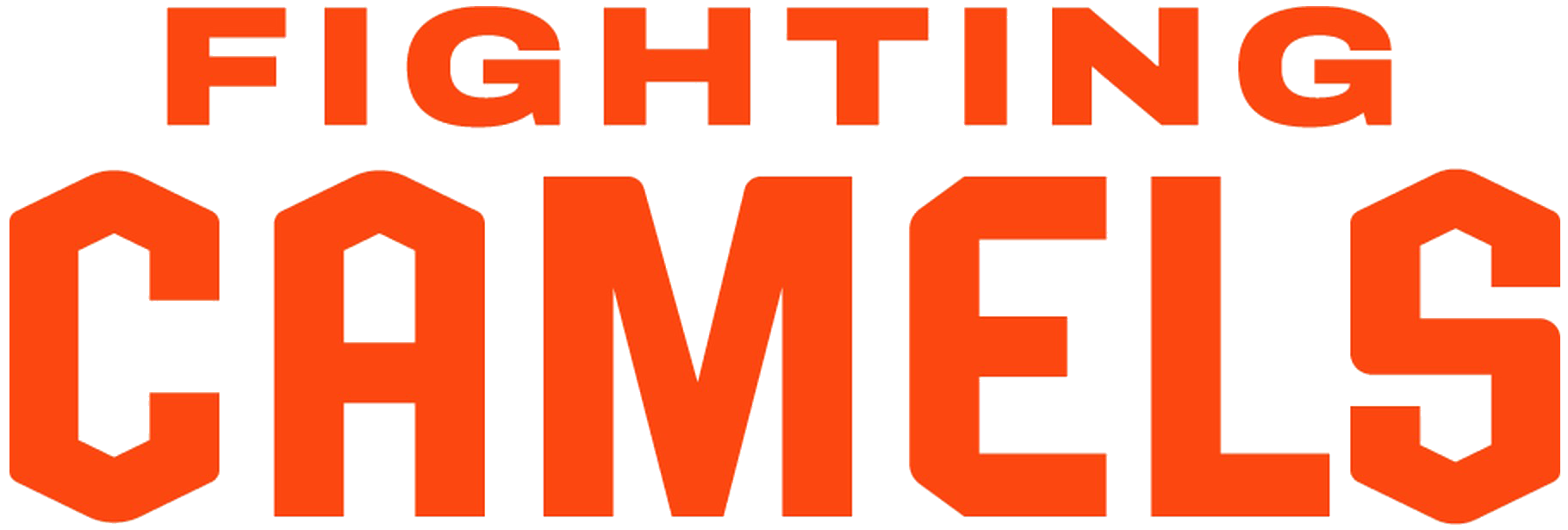

The Campbell Fighting Camels are the athletic teams that represent Campbell University, located in Buies Creek, North Carolina, in intercollegiate sports at the Division I level of the National Collegiate Athletic Association (NCAA), primarily competing in the Coastal Athletic Association (CAA) since the 2023–24 academic year. The football program competes in the FCS, formerly known as I-AA.

Campbell competes in 21 intercollegiate varsity sports. Men's sports include baseball, basketball, cross country, football, golf, soccer, tennis, track and field (indoor and outdoor), and wrestling; while women's sports include basketball, cross country, golf, lacrosse, soccer, softball, swimming, tennis, track and field (indoor and outdoor), and volleyball.

== Conference affiliations ==
The Fighting Camels are full members of the Coastal Athletic Association. The University, however, fields teams as associate members of other conferences for sports the Coastal Athletic Association does not sponsor. Campbell is an associate member of the Southern Conference for wrestling. The women's swimming team was formerly an associate member of the Northeast Conference until 2007 when Campbell became a charter member of the Coastal Collegiate Swimming Association along with 11 other women's swimming programs as well as six men's swimming teams. The Fighting Camels football team began play in 2008 and is a member of the Pioneer Football League, which would then move up to the Big South Conference to join the rest of all Campbell University Athletics in 2015. Campbell launched a varsity women's lacrosse team in 2012–13.

Campbell University became a four-year college in 1961 and began competing athletically in the National Association of Intercollegiate Athletics (NAIA). In 1977, the Fighting Camels program joined the National Collegiate Athletic Association (NCAA) at the Division I level. Campbell was a charter member of the Big South Conference in 1983, before leaving to join the Trans-America Athletic Conference, which is now the ASUN Conference, in 1994. Campbell returned to the Big South on July 1, 2011 and competes in all sports, except for wrestling and women's swimming and diving.

Campbell joined the Coastal Athletic Association in all sports sponsored by the conference effective July 1, 2023. The wrestling team will remain in the Southern Conference.

NCAA

- Big South Conference (1983–1994)
- Atlantic Sun Conference (1994–2011)
- Big South Conference (2011–2023)
- Coastal Athletic Association (2023–present)

== Varsity teams ==
Men's sports	Women's sports
Baseball	Basketball
Basketball	Cross country
Cross country	Golf
Football	Lacrosse
Golf	Soccer
Soccer	Softball
Tennis	Swimming and diving
Track and field^{†}	Tennis
Wrestling (Note: The wrestling team competes as an associate member of the Southern Conference.)	Track and field^{†}
	Volleyball
† – Track and field includes both indoor and outdoor

=== Football ===
Campbell announced in April 2006 that the university would be restarting its football program for 2008. The Fighting Camels compete at the NCAA Division I FCS level as a member of the Big South Conference beginning in the 2018 season. Dale Steele was the first head coach of the Camels and coached from the 2008 season to the 2012 season. His best season was the 2011 season in which the Camels finished 6–5. On November 27, 2012, Campbell University announced former University of Nebraska and Carolina Panthers standout, Mike Minter, as their new Head Football Coach.

=== Men's basketball ===
Campbell's basketball teams play their home games in the 3,100-seat John W. Pope, Jr. Convocation Center which opened in 2008 and replaced Carter Gymnasium. Campbell's only men's basketball conference championship at the Division I level occurred in 1992 when the Fighting Camels won the Big South Conference tournament held that year at the Civic Center of Anderson in Anderson, South Carolina. This win placed Campbell in the 1992 NCAA Division I men's basketball tournament and 1992 is still the school's only NCAA appearance. The 16th seeded Fighting Camels were defeated by the top-seeded Duke Blue Devils in Greensboro, North Carolina, 82–56.

=== Women's basketball ===
The Fighting Camels women's basketball program have two conference championship seasons. Campbell won the Big South Conference tournament in 1989 by defeating Radford University 58–53 in Radford, Virginia. Campbell also won the 2000 Atlantic Sun Conference championship, held in Pelham, Alabama by defeating Georgia State University 66–49, which earned the Lady Camels a 15th seed in the 2000 NCAA Division I women's basketball tournament East Regional. However, Campbell lost in the opening round to the 2nd seeded Duke Blue Devils at Cameron Indoor Stadium in Durham, North Carolina. Ronny Fisher is in his eighth season as the head coach as of the 2023–24 season, having taken over after Wanda Watkins' 35-year tenure on April 5, 2016.

=== Baseball ===
The Fighting Camels baseball team plays its home games at the on-campus Jim Perry Stadium, which was known until 2012 as Taylor Field. Jim Perry was a baseball and basketball player at Campbell prior to playing in Major League Baseball and earning the 1970 American League Cy Young Award. Campbell won the Big South Conference titles in 1988, 1990, 2014, 2018 and 2019. The last appearance by the Fighting Camels in the NCAA Division I baseball tournament was in 2021 when the team played in the Starkville Regional in Starkville, Mississippi. Former Major League Baseball pitcher Jim Perry played college ball for the Fighting Camels from 1955 to 1956. Jim's Hall of Fame brother, Gaylord, also went to Campbell from 1958 to 1960 but didn't play baseball. Campbell alum Cedric Mullins, a member of the Baltimore Orioles, was named to the MLB All-Star Game in 2021. The Fighting Camels are now coached by Justin Haire.

=== Men's wrestling ===
The Fighting Camels wrestling team is an associate member of the Southern Conference. Wrestling was founded at Campbell in 1968 under the guidance of Gerald Brown. There have been 10 different coaches that directed the Camels over the past 40 years. The most notable coach would have to be Dave Auble. Auble (1999–2004) was a former U.S. Olympic wrestling coach. The most successful coach was Jerry Hartman. Hartman (1981–1988) had a record of 80–39 in his career as a head coach. The team was coached by former U.S. Olympian Cary Kolat from 2016 to 2020. His successor is Scotti Sentes, a two-time All-American for Central Michigan University. In 2017, the team achieved career highs with its first Southern Conference title, five NCAA qualifiers, and the school's first All-American in Nathan Kraisser.

== Traditions ==
=== Mascot ===
Before 1934 Campbell's athletic teams were known as the "Hornets". Other early known nicknames for the program were simply reflective of the school name, like "Campbells" or "Campbellites". The origin of the name "Fighting Camels" is popularly believed to be derived from a statement by early school patron Zachary Taylor Kivett, who approached school founder James Archibald Campbell after a fire had destroyed the three then existing school buildings in 1900 and said, "Your name's Campbell; then get a hump on you! We've got work to do." Campbell thought Kivett said, "you're a camel, then get a hump on you!"

== Notable alumni ==
=== Baseball ===
- Scott Jackson
- Cedric Mullins
- Zach Neto
- Jim Perry
- Ryan Thompson

=== Men's basketball ===
- Chris Clemons
- Fred Whitfield

=== Men's golf ===
- Pontus Nyholm

=== Men's soccer ===
- David Doyle
- Travis Golden
- Thibaut Jacquel
- Pasi Kinturi
- Eduardo Maceira
- Steven Riches
- Eric Swalwell

=== Softball ===
- Kailey Latimer Farmer

=== Women's golf ===
- Annelie Sjöholm

=== Women's soccer ===
- Pirjo Leppikangas
- Ryann Torrero
