= Tebe Dorgu =

Nigerian wrestler (born 1974)

Personal information
- Nationality: Nigerian
- Born: 2 August 1974 (age 51)

Sport
- Sport: Wrestling

Tebe Dorgu (born 2 August 1974) is a Nigerian wrestler. He competed in the men's freestyle 57 kg at the 1992 Summer Olympics.
