= Andrés Iniesta (wrestler) =

Spanish wrestler

Personal information
- Nationality: Spanish
- Born: 22 January 1974 (age 52) Albacete, Spain

Sport
- Sport: Wrestling

Andrés Iniesta (born 22 January 1974) is a Spanish wrestler. He competed in the men's freestyle 57 kg at the 1992 Summer Olympics.
