= Ashok Kumar Garg =

Indian wrestler (born 1969)

Ashok Kumar
Personal information
- Nationality: Indian
- Born: 7 July 1969 (age 57) Rohtak, India

Sport
- Sport: Wrestling
Medal record
Freestyle wrestling
Representing India
Commonwealth Games
Silver medal – second place	1994 Victoria	57 kg

Ashok Kumar Garg (born 7 July 1969) is an Indian wrestler. He competed in the men's freestyle 57 kg at the 1992 Summer Olympics. In 1993, he won the Arjuna Award.
