= Steven Riches =

English Football player (born 1976)

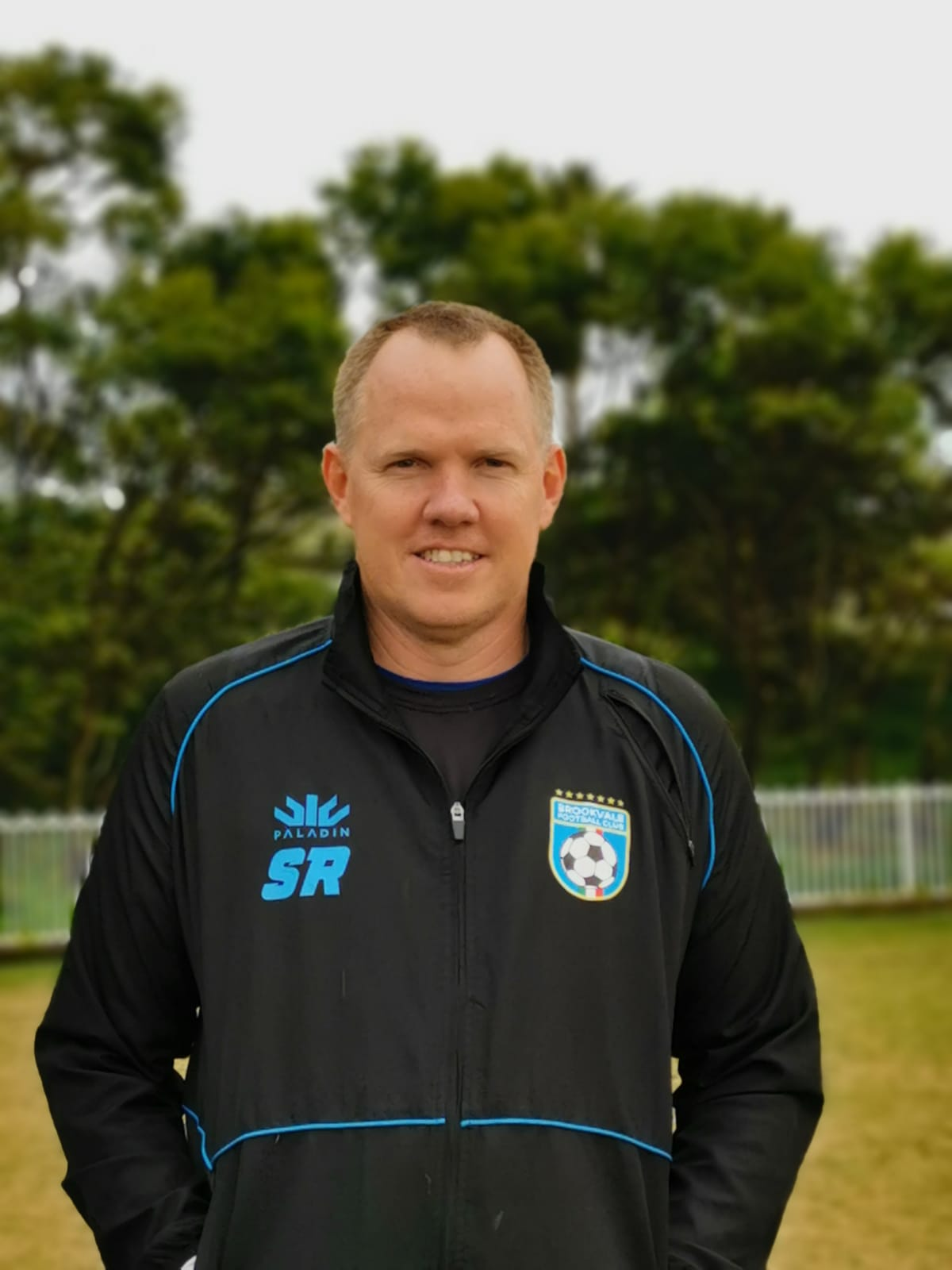
- Riches in 2020

Personal information
- Date of birth: 5 August 1976 (age 50)
- Place of birth: Sydney, Australia
- Position: Midfielder

College career
Years	Team	Apps	(Gls)
1995–1996	Campbell Fighting Camels		

Senior career*
Years	Team	Apps	(Gls)
1995	Manly Warringah Dolphins		
1995–1996	Leyton Orient		
1996-1997	Northampton Town		
1997	Raunds Town	4	(0)
1998	King's Lynn		
1998	Blacktown City		
2003-2011	Brookvale		
- * Club domestic league appearances and goals as of 10 May 2009

Steven Alexander Riches (born 6 August 1976) is an Australian soccer player.

== Playing career ==
Steven Riches is a retired journeyman footballer who plied his trade on three continents.

Whilst still a teenager, under coach John Kosmina, Riches won the NSW Super League double (Premiers and Grand Final) with the Manly Warringah Dolphins in 1995.

Later in 1995 Riches moved to the USA playing for Campbell University of North Carolina in NCAA Division I, where he picked up Rookie-of-the-Year honours. The Fighting Camels were NCAA play-off contenders and won the ASUN Conference division title.

In 1996, Riches then left for England where he had an extensive trial with West Ham (and later Crewe Alexandra) eventually staying in the capital and signing for Orient. The club giving him a contract on the recommendation of former England Youth Team coach John Cartwright. He made his debut at Rochdale two days after signing.

In his home debut for Orient (against Swansea) Riches helped set up the Dave Hanson winner late into the game. English football writer and novelist, Brian Glanville noted the "dancing feet" of a slender 20-year-old Australian, in The Times newspaper.

From 1997 to 1998 Riches moved to Northampton Town and finished his English experience with Raunds Town then King's Lynn.

In 1999, he returned to Australia in what was a successful stint at Blacktown City in the New South Wales Super League, then the top league for NSW. Playing well over 100 games he picked up 9 medals in a four-year stay including a second Premiers and Grand Final NSW Super League double in 2000 (as he had done back in 1995 with Manly).

In 2003, Riches then returned to Manly Warringah (MWFA) where his career first started. He signed for Brookvale F.C. on Sydney's Northern Beaches, one of Australia's biggest and strongest football regions. The Brookvale team of the era, under coach Rocky Carlino, was described as a dynasty, in a period of unprecedented success.

In an eight-year stay, until 2011, Riches helped the team win a record six MWFA titles plus a NSW Champion-of-Champions crown.

== Personal life ==
In retirement from the game, Riches is an executive manager for a fitness company but remains a Peninsula football identity.
