= Leonid Zaslavsky =

Australian wrestler

Personal information
- Nationality: Australian
- Born: 26 November 1969 (age 56) Odesa, Ukraine

Sport
- Sport: Wrestling

Leonid Zaslavsky (born 26 November 1969) is an Australian wrestler. He competed in the men's freestyle 62 kg at the 1996 Summer Olympics.
