= Rumen Pavlov =

Bulgarian wrestler

Personal information
- Native name: Румен Стефанов Павлов
- Full name: Rumen Stefanov Pavlov
- Nationality: Bulgarian
- Born: 21 March 1964 (age 62) Sliven, Bulgaria
- Height: 162 cm (5 ft 4 in)
- Weight: 57 kg (126 lb; 9 st 0 lb)

Sport
- Sport: Wrestling
- Club: JSK - Spartak, Varna, Etyr Veliko Tarnovo, Slavia Liteks, Sofia

Achievements and titles
- Olympic finals: 5th place
Medal record
Men's freestyle wrestling
Representing the Bulgaria
World Championships
Bronze medal – third place	1989 Martigny	57 kg
Silver medal – second place	1990 Tokyo	57 kg
European Championships
Bronze medal – third place	1992 Kaposvár	57 kg
Gold medal – first place	1990 Poznań	57 kg
European Espoirs Championships
Gold medal – first place	1984 Slaghaven	57 kg

Rumen Stefanov Pavlov (born 21 March 1964) is a Bulgarian wrestler. He competed in the men's freestyle 57 kg at the 1992 Summer Olympics.
