= Eduardo Maceira =

Venezuelan footballer (born 1996)

Personal information
- Full name: Eduardo José Maceira Galarraga
- Date of birth: 30 April 1996 (age 30)
- Place of birth: Caracas, Venezuela
- Height: 1.81 m (5 ft 11 in)
- Position: Winger

Youth career
- Colegio Los Arcos
- Deportivo La Guaira

College career
Years	Team	Apps	(Gls)
2014–2015	South Florida Bulls	40	(7)
2016	Campbell Fighting Camels	2	(0)

Senior career*
Years	Team	Apps	(Gls)
2013–2014	Deportivo La Guaira	4	(0)
2017	Albacete B	11	(1)
2017–2018	San Fernando	10	(0)
2018	Los Barrios	11	(0)
2018–2019	Almudévar	35	(7)
2019–2020	Utebo	15	(2)
2020	Almagro	7	(1)
2021–2022	Novelda	32	(9)
2022–2023	Callosa Deportiva	25	(1)
2023	CFI Alicante	6	(0)
2023	Santa Pola	4	(0)

International career
2013	Venezuela U17	12	(0)
- * Club domestic league appearances and goals as of 20:18, 26 October 2024 (UTC)

Eduardo José Maceira Galarraga (born 30 April 1996) is a Venezuelan footballer who plays as a left winger.

== Football career ==
Maceira was born in Caracas, and finished his formation with Deportivo La Guaira. He made his professional – and Primera División – debut on 22 May 2013, coming on as a second-half substitute in a 1–2 away loss against Mineros de Guayana.

On 15 August 2014, Maceira moved abroad and joined University of South Florida's South Florida Bulls. In 2016, he moved to Campbell University and was assigned to the soccer side Fighting Camels.

In February 2017, Maceira joined Albacete Balompié and was assigned to the reserves in Tercera División. On 13 July, he moved to Segunda División B side San Fernando CD.
