= Jo Yong-son =

North Korean wrestler (born 1970)

Personal information
- Nationality: North Korean
- Born: 23 June 1970 (age 56)

Sport
- Sport: Wrestling

Jo Yong-son (born 23 June 1970) is a North Korean wrestler. He competed in the men's freestyle 63 kg at the 2000 Summer Olympics.
