= Kim Yong-sik (wrestler) =

North Korean wrestler (born 1967)

- Hangul: 김영식
- RR: Gim Yeongsik
- MR: Kim Yŏngsik

Olympic medal record

Men's freestyle wrestling

Representing North Korea

Olympic Games
Bronze medal – third place	1992 Barcelona	57 kg

Kim Yong-sik (Korean: 김영식; born 17 November 1967) is a Korean former wrestler who competed in the 1992 Summer Olympics.
