= Campbell Fighting Camels wrestling =

Wrestling team representing Campbell University in North Carolina, US

Campbell Fighting Camels Wrestling
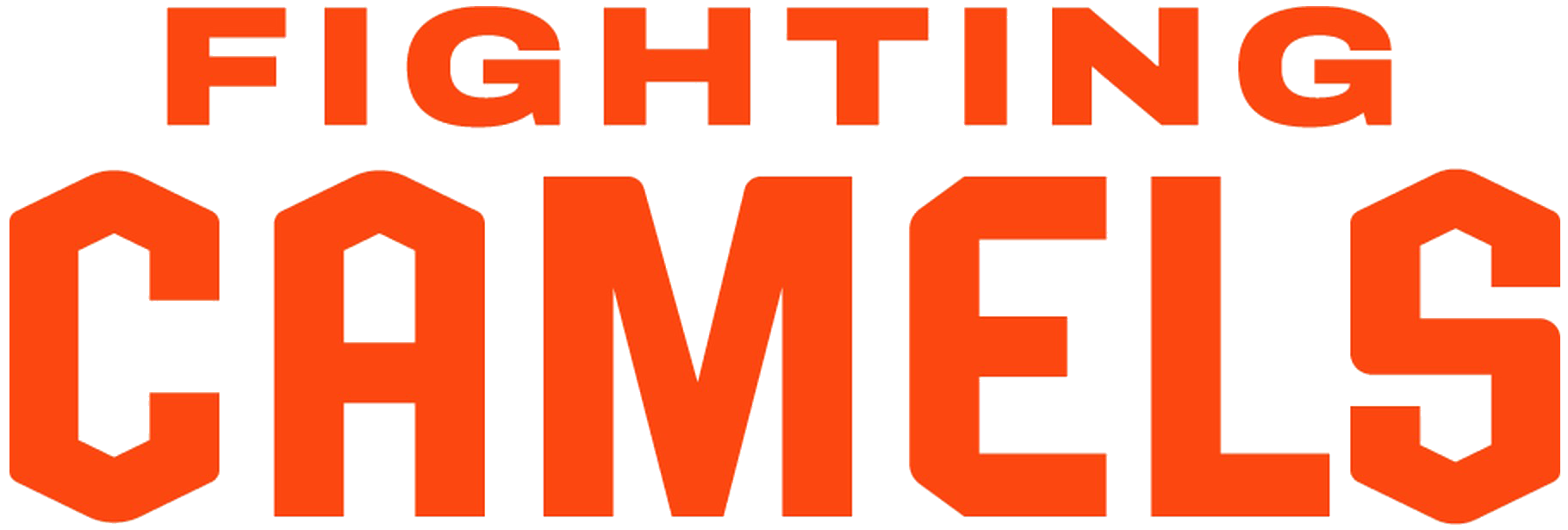
- University: Campbell University
- Head coach: TJ Dudley (1st season)
- Conference: SoCon
- Location: Buies Creek, NC
- Arena: John W. Pope Jr. Convocation Center (capacity: 3,095)
- Nickname: Fighting Camels
- Colors: Black and orange

All-Americans
- 4

Conference championships
- 2019, 2020, 2021, 2024, 2025

Conference Tournament championships
- 2017, 2019, 2020, 2021, 2022

The Campbell Fighting Camels wrestling team represents Campbell University of Buies Creek, North Carolina. The current head coach is TJ Dudley, who was a three-time All-American and NCAA runner-up in 2016 for Nebraska. The Fighting Camels are full members of the non-wrestling Coastal Athletic Association, with the wrestling team competing as an associate member of the Southern Conference (SoCon).

== History ==
Wrestling was founded at Campbell in 1968 under the guidance of Gerald Brown. Coach Jerry Hartman, who served as head coach from 1981 to 1988, led the Camels to an 80–39 record during his tenure as head coach. Former U.S. Olympian Dave Auble served as head coach of the wrestling team from 1999 to 2004.

During former U.S. Olympian and World team member Cary Kolat's six years as head coach (2014–2020), Campbell wrestling reached new heights. In 2017, Campbell won its first Southern Conference title in team history, sending five to the NCAA tournament. Nathan Kraisser also became the school's first All-American wrestler in 2017. The team would win a total of five Southern Conference championships during Kolat's tenure, winning two conference regular season titles and three conference tournament titles.

Former two-time NCAA All-American Scotti Sentes served as head coach of the program from 2020 to 2025. During Sentes tenure as head coach, the Campbell wrestling program won two regular season Southern Conference championships and two conference tournament championships.
