= Kim Chun-ho =

South Korean wrestler

Personal information
- Nationality: South Korean
- Born: 8 October 1964 (age 61)

Sport
- Sport: Wrestling

Kim Chun-ho (Korean: 김춘호, born 8 October 1964) is a South Korean wrestler. He competed in the men's freestyle 57 kg at the 1992 Summer Olympics.
