= Enrique Cubas =

Peruvian wrestler (born 1974)

Personal information
- Nationality: Peruvian
- Born: 21 March 1974 (age 52) Lima, Peru

Sport
- Sport: Wrestling
Medal record
Representing Peru
Pan American Games
Silver medal – second place	1999 Winnipeg	-63kg Greco-Roman

Enrique Manuel Cubas Ypanaque (born 21 March 1974) is a Peruvian wrestler. He competed in the men's freestyle 62 kg at the 1996 Summer Olympics.
