= István Demeter =

Hungarian wrestler

Personal information
- Nationality: Hungarian
- Born: 7 January 1972 (age 54) Reghin, Romania

Sport
- Sport: Wrestling

István Demeter (born 7 January 1972) is a Hungarian wrestler. He competed in the men's freestyle 62 kg at the 1996 Summer Olympics.
