= Tsovasar =

Village in Gegharkunik, Armenia

Tsovasar Ծովասար
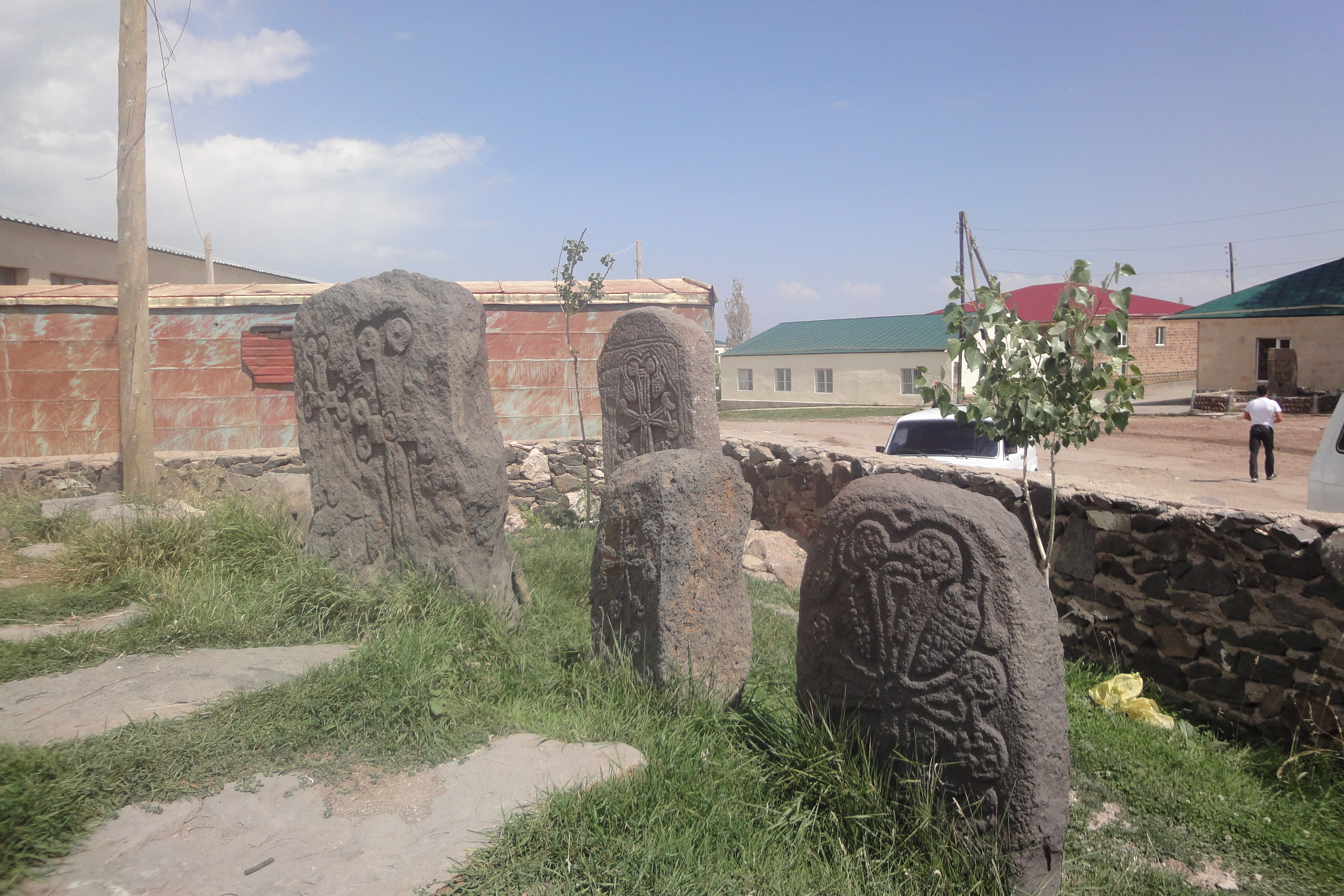
- Khachkars in Tsovasar

- Location within Armenia Location within Gegharkunik
- Coordinates: 40°08′24″N 45°11′24″E
- Country: Armenia
- Province: Gegharkunik
- Municipality: Martuni

Population (2011)
  - Total: 2,708
- Time zone: UTC+4 (AMT)

Tsovasar (Armenian: Ծովասար) is a village in the Martuni Municipality of the Gegharkunik Province of Armenia.

== History ==
The town contains a church, dedicated to Saint Gregory the Illuminator, dating to the 9th century, and a 16th-century St. Astavatsatsin church.

== Gallery ==
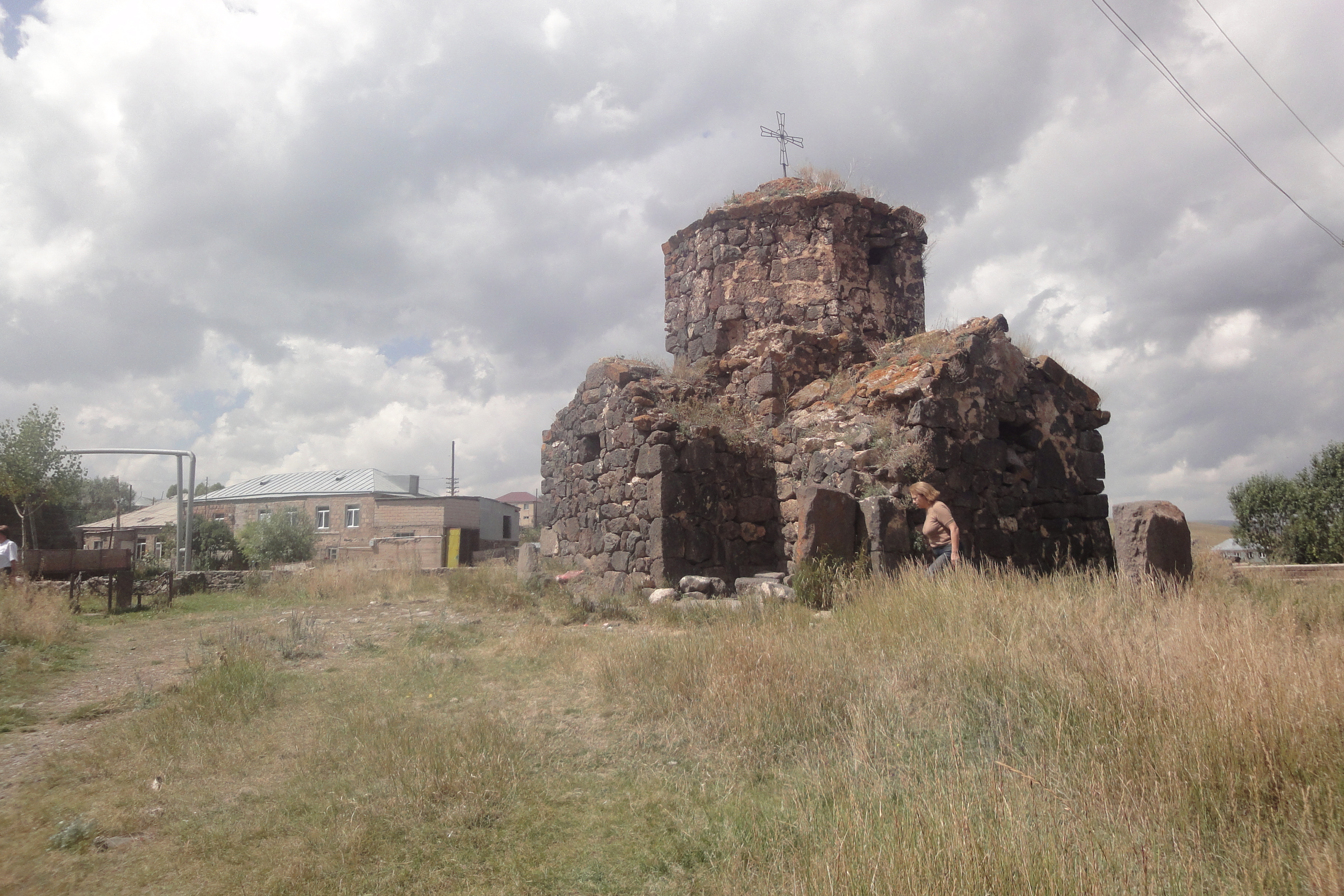
St. Grigor Lusavorich Church

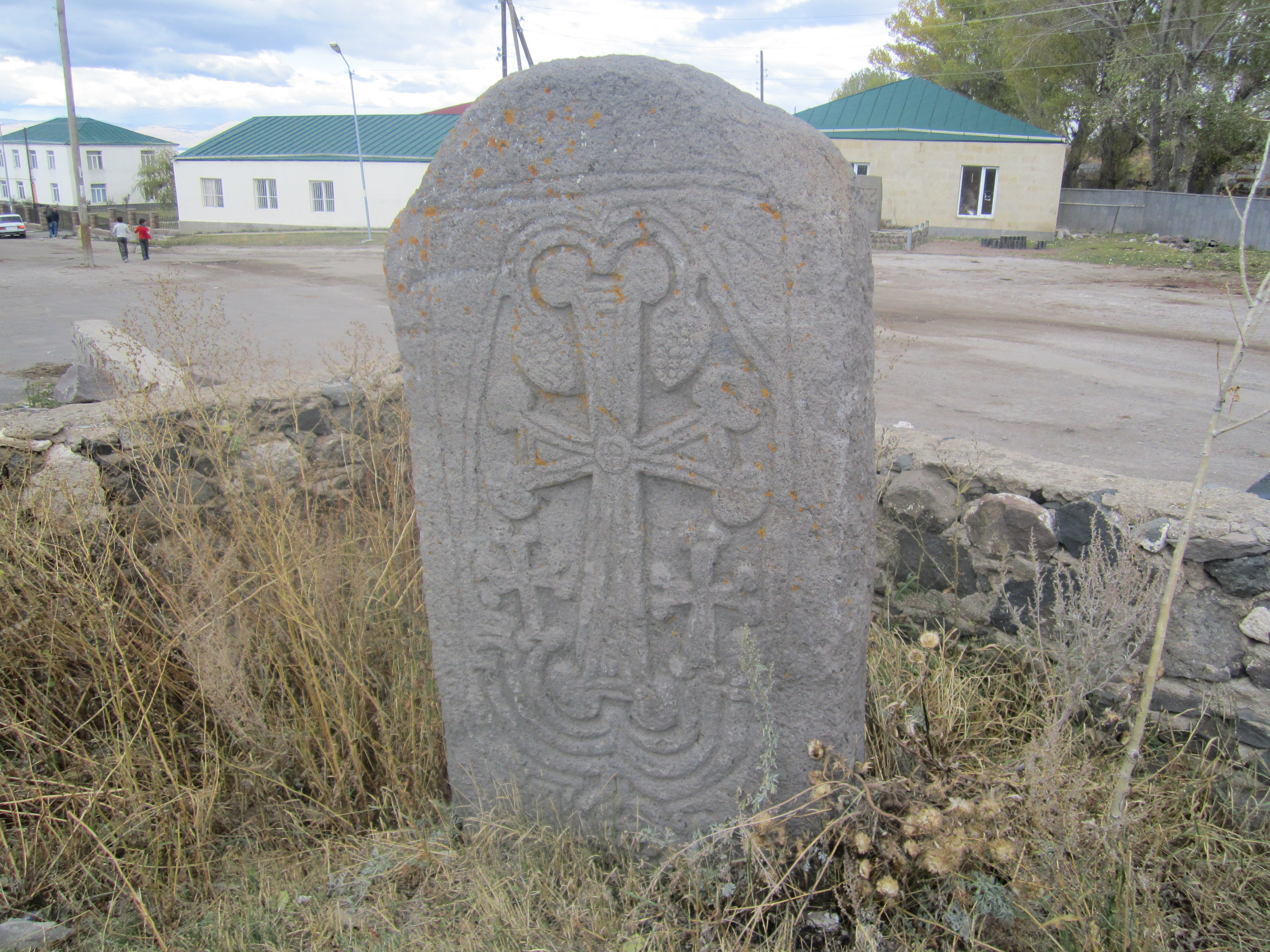
Khachkar in Tsovasar

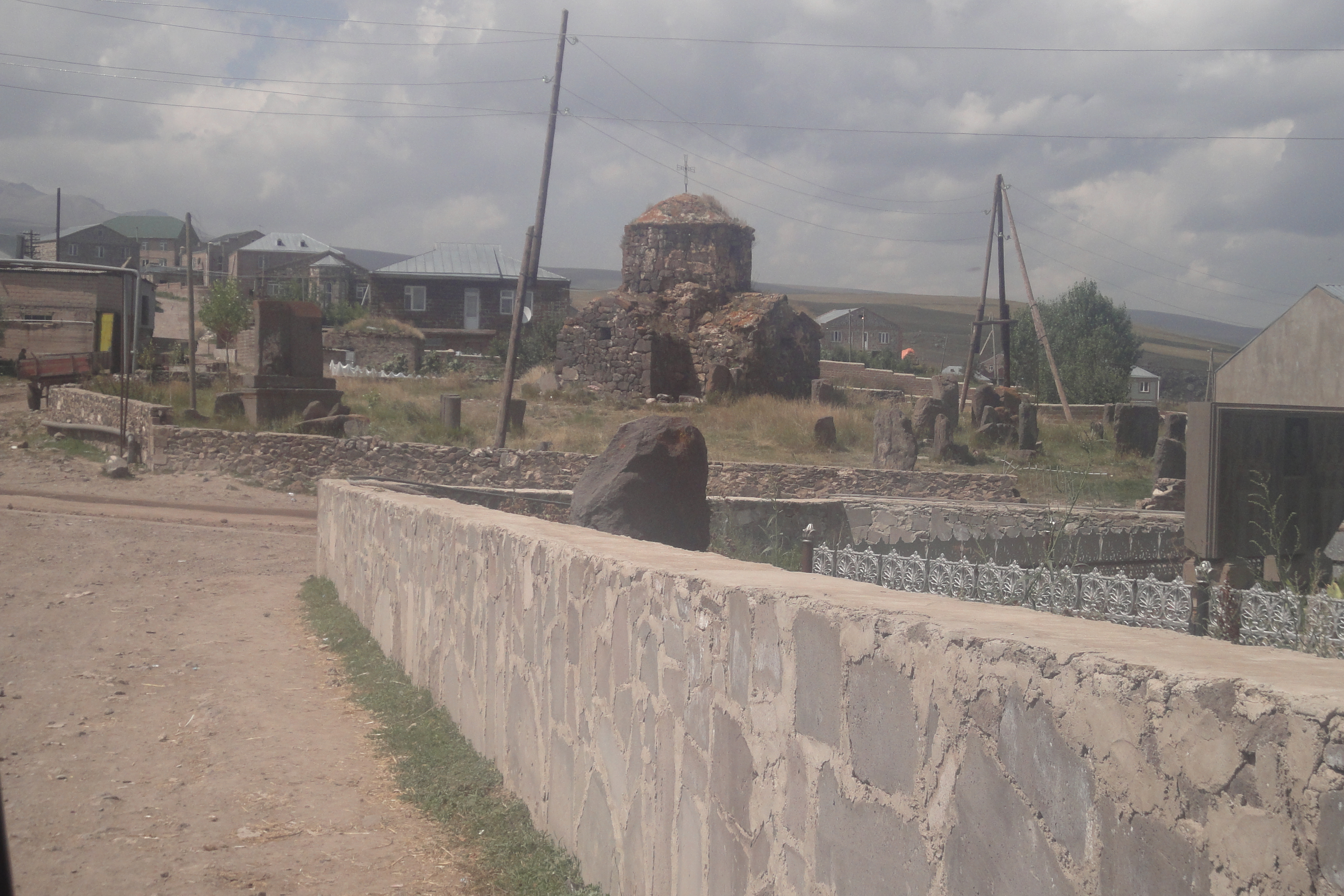
St. Grigor Lusavorich Church

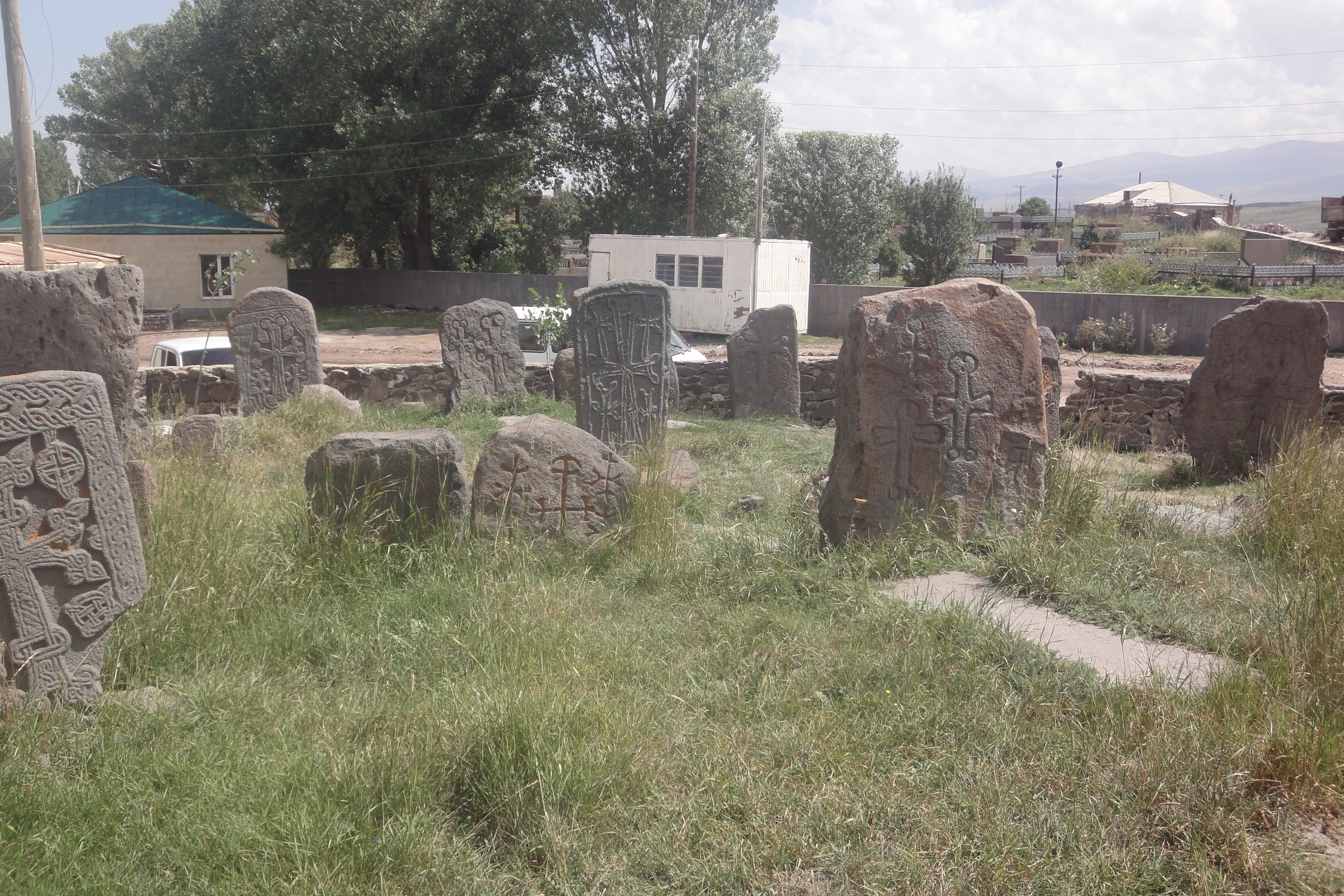
Khachkars in Tsovasar

== Notable people ==
- Arshak Hayrapetyan, is an Armenian Freestyle wrestler.
