= Hussain Arif =

Pakistani sprinter (born 1968)

Personal information
- Nationality: Pakistani
- Born: 25 December 1968 (age 57)

Sport
- Sport: Sprinting
- Event: 200 metres

Hussain Arif (born 25 December 1968) is a Pakistani former sprinter. He competed in the men's 200 metres at the 1992 Summer Olympics.
