= Tazagyukh, Ararat =

Tazagyukh
- Location within Armenia Location within Ararat
- Coordinates: 40°05′54″N 44°27′48″E
- Country: Armenia
- Marz (Province): Ararat
- Time zone: UTC+4 ( )
  - Summer (DST): UTC+5 ( )

Tazagyukh (also, Trazagyukh) is a town in the Ararat Province of Armenia.

== See also ==
- Ararat Province
