= Keiji Okuyama =

Japanese wrestler

Personal information
- Nationality: Japanese
- Born: 18 December 1968 (age 57) Tokyo, Japan

Sport
- Sport: Wrestling

Keiji Okuyama (奥山 恵二, Okuyama Keiji; born 18 December 1968) is a Japanese wrestler. He competed in the men's freestyle 57 kg at the 1992 Summer Olympics.
