= Naseer Ahmed (wrestler) =

Pakistani wrestler (born 1972)

Personal information
- Nationality: Pakistani
- Born: 14 June 1972 (age 54)

Sport
- Sport: Wrestling

Naseer Ahmed (born 14 June 1972) is a Pakistani wrestler. He competed in the men's freestyle 57 kg at the 1992 Summer Olympics.
