= Araik Baghdadyan =

Armenian freestyle wrestler (born 1973)

Personal information
- Born: 29 August 1973 (age 52)
- Height: 1.70 m (5 ft 7 in)
- Weight: 62 kg (137 lb)

Sport
- Sport: Wrestling
- Event: Freestyle
- Club: Sportschool Yerevan
- Coached by: Andranik Haruyan
Medal record
Men's freestyle wrestling
Representing Armenia
European Championships
Silver medal – second place	1994 Rome	62 kg

Araik Baghdadyan (Armenian: Արայիկ Բաղդադյան, born 29 August 1973) is a retired Armenian Freestyle wrestler and coach.

Baghdadyan won a silver medal at the 1994 European Wrestling Championships. Baghdadyan is now the chief coach of Armenia's freestyle wrestling team.
