= Štefan Fernyák =

Slovak freestyle wrestler

Personal information
- Full name: Štefan Fernyák
- Nationality: Slovakia
- Born: 2 June 1973 (age 53) Dunajská Streda, Czechoslovakia
- Height: 1.69 m (5 ft 6 1/2 in)
- Weight: 66 kg (146 lb)

Sport
- Style: Freestyle
- Club: Dunajplavba Bratislava
- Coach: Ľubomir Lohyňa
Medal record
Men's freestyle wrestling
European Championships
Bronze medal – third place	1993 Istanbul	62 kg

Štefan Fernyák (born June 2, 1973 in Dunajská Streda) is a retired amateur Slovak freestyle wrestler, who competed in the men's lightweight and welterweight category. Fernyak claimed a bronze medal for the newly Slovak team in the 62-kg division at the 1993 European Wrestling Championships in Istanbul, Turkey, and later represented his nation Slovakia in two editions of the Olympic Games (2000 and 2004). Throughout his sporting career, Fernyak trained as part of the freestyle wrestling team for Dunajplavba Sports Club in Bratislava, under his longtime coach and mentor Ľubomir Lohyňa.

Fernyak made his official debut at the 2000 Summer Olympics in Sydney, where he competed in the men's lightweight division (63 kg). He lost the prelim pool matches twice to Azerbaijan's Shamil Afandiyev and South Korea's Jang Jae-sung, who outclassed him with a technical superiority score, but offered a chance to receive a free triumph as the Turkish-born Australian wrestler Musa Ilhan suffered an injury from his match against Afandiyev. Finishing third in the elimination round and eighth overall, Fernyak's performance was not enough to put him further into the quarterfinals.

At the 2004 Summer Olympics in Athens, Fernyak qualified for the Slovak squad, as a 31-year-old, in the men's welterweight class (66 kg) by rounding out the top 10 spots from the 2003 World Wrestling Championships in New York City, New York, United States. He was placed by a random draw into a three-man preliminary pool against Turkey's Ömer Çubukçu and Hungary's Gábor Hatos. At the end of the pool, Fernyak could not generate a blistering record from Sydney with two straight losses each to Cubukcu (1–5) and Hatos (1–3) on two technical points, finishing only in third place and sixteenth overall in the final standings.
