= Vath Chamroeun =

Cambodian wrestler

Vath Chamroeun OLY
Personal information
- Nationality: Cambodian
- Born: 12 October 1972 (age 53)

Sport
- Sport: Wrestling

Vath Chamroeun OLY (born 12 October 1972) is a Cambodian wrestler. He competed in the men's freestyle 62 kg at the 1996 Summer Olympics. He subsequently became secretary general of the National Olympic Committee of Cambodia.
