= Takahiro Wada =

Japanese wrestler (born 1971)

Personal information
- Native name: 和田貴広
- Nationality: Japan
- Born: 16 November 1971 (age 54) Kagoshima, Japan
- Education: Kokushikan University
- Height: 175 cm (5 ft 9 in)

Sport
- Country: Japan
- Sport: Wrestling
- Weight class: 62-69 kg
- Event: Freestyle

Achievements and titles
- Olympic finals: 4th (1996)
Medal record
Men's freestyle wrestling
Representing Japan
World Championships
Silver medal – second place	1995 Atlanta	62 kg
Asian Games
Gold medal – first place	1994 Hiroshima	62 kg
Asian Championships
Gold medal – first place	1996 Xiaoshan	62 kg
Silver medal – second place	1999 Tashkent	69 kg
Silver medal – second place	1993 Ulaanbaatar	62 kg
Bronze medal – third place	1995 Manila	62 kg
Golden Grand Prix Ivan Yarygin
Gold medal – first place	1995 Krasnoyarsk	62 kg

Takahiro Wada (born 16 November 1971) is a Japanese former wrestler who competed in the 1996 Summer Olympics and in the 2000 Summer Olympics.
