= Mikalai Savin =

Belarusian wrestler

Personal information
- Nationality: Belarusian
- Born: 1 June 1976 (age 50)

Sport
- Sport: Wrestling

Mikalai Savin (born 1 June 1976) is a Belarusian wrestler. He competed in the men's freestyle 63 kg at the 2000 Summer Olympics.
