= Shamil Afandiyev =

Azerbaijani wrestler

Personal information
- Full name: Şamil Sultan Əfəndiyev
- Nationality: Azerbaijani
- Born: 13 October 1972 (age 53)

Sport
- Sport: Wrestling

Shamil Afandiyev (born 13 October 1972) is an Azerbaijani wrestler. He competed in the men's freestyle 63 kg at the 2000 Summer Olympics.
