= Maksat Boburbekov =

Kyrgyzstani wrestler (born 1974)

Personal information
- Nationality: Kyrgyzstani
- Born: 19 March 1974 (age 52)

Sport
- Sport: Wrestling

Maksat Boburbekov (born 19 March 1974) is a Kyrgyzstani wrestler. He competed in the men's freestyle 63 kg at the 2000 Summer Olympics.
