= Musa Ilhan =

Australian wrestler

Personal information
- Nationality: Australian
- Born: 3 October 1969 (age 56) Çarşamba, Turkey

Sport
- Sport: Wrestling

Musa Ilhan (born 3 October 1969) is an Australian wrestler. He competed at the 1992 Summer Olympics and the 2000 Summer Olympics.
