= Arout Parsekian =

Armenian-Cypriot freestyle wrestler (born 1970)

Medal record

Men's freestyle wrestling

Representing Cyprus

Commonwealth Games
Bronze medal – third place	1994 Victoria	62 kg

Arout Parsekian (Greek: Αρούτ Παρσεκιάν, born April 17, 1970) is a retired Armenian-Cypriot Freestyle wrestler.

Parsekian competed at the 1996 Summer Olympics. He is only the second wrestler from Cyprus to qualify for the Olympics, after Konstantinos Iliadis.
