= Tserenbaataryn Tsogtbayar =

Mongolian wrestler (born 1970)

Personal information
- Native name: Цэрэнбаатарын Цогтбаяр
- Nationality: Mongolia
- Born: October 31, 1970 (age 55) Chandmani, Khovd, Mongolia
- Height: 165 cm (5 ft 5 in)

Sport
- Country: Mongolia
- Sport: Wrestling
- Weight class: 57–63 kg
- Rank: Honored Athlete of Mongolia in freestyle wrestling
- Event: Freestyle
- Club: Central Army Sports Club; Ulaanbaatar
- Coached by: Batbilig

Achievements and titles
- Olympic finals: 10th(1992) 17th(1996)
- World finals: 5th(1991) (bronze) (1993) 4th(1995) 6th(1997)
- Regional finals: (gold) (1993) (silver) (1996)
Medal record
Men's freestyle wrestling
Representing Mongolia
World Championships
Bronze medal – third place	1993 Toronto	57 kg
Asian Games
Gold medal – first place	1994 Hiroshima	57 kg
Bronze medal – third place	1998 Bangkok	63 kg
Asian Championships
Gold medal – first place	1993 Ulaanbaatar	57 kg
Silver medal – second place	1996 Xiaoshan	57 kg
Golden Grand Prix Ivan Yarygin
Silver medal – second place	1995 Krasnoyarsk	62 kg
Bronze medal – third place	1992 Krasnoyarsk	57 kg
Yasar Dogu Tournament
Silver medal – second place	1996 Ankara	57 kg

Tserenbaataryn Tsogtbayar (Mongolian: Цэрэнбаатарын Цогтбаяр; born 31 October 1970) is a Mongolian former wrestler who competed in the 1992 Summer Olympics and in the 1996 Summer Olympics.
