= Magomed Azizov =

Russian of Avar descent former wrestler

Personal information
- Native name: Магомед Азизов
- Nationality: Russia
- Born: May 12, 1969 Makhachkala, Soviet Union
- Height: 165 cm (5 ft 5 in)

Sport
- Country: Russia
- Sport: Wrestling
- Weight class: 62-63 kg
- Event: Freestyle
Medal record
Men's freestyle wrestling
Representing Russia
World Championships
Gold medal – first place	1994 Istanbul	62 kg
Bronze medal – third place	1995 Atlanta	62 kg
Bronze medal – third place	1997 Krasnoyarsk	63 kg
European Championships
Gold medal – first place	1997 Warsaw	63 kg
Gold medal – first place	1996 Budapest	62 kg
Gold medal – first place	1995 Fribourg	62 kg
Gold medal – first place	1993 Istanbul	62 kg

Magomed Kurbanovich Azizov (Russian: Азизов Магомед Курбанович; born 12 May 1969) is a Russian of Avar descent former wrestler who competed in the 1992 Summer Olympics and in the 1996 Summer Olympics.

World Champion 1994 and three time European Champion. He is former member of Dynamo Wrestling Club.
