= Abbas Hajkenari =

Iranian wrestler

Medal record

Representing Iran

Men's freestyle wrestling

World Championships
Gold medal – first place	1997 Krasnoyarsk	63 kg
Silver medal – second place	1998 Tehran	63 kg

Asian Championships
Gold medal – first place	1997 Tehran	63 kg
Bronze medal – third place	1996 Xiaoshan	62 kg

Abbas Hajkenari (Persian: عباس حاج كناری; born March 13, 1974) is an Iranian retired wrestler. He was born in Fereydoon Kenar.
