= Arshak Hayrapetyan =

Armenian freestyle wrestler

Personal information
- Born: 8 November 1978 (age 47) Tsovasar, Armenian SSR, Soviet Union
- Height: 1.70 m (5 ft 7 in)
- Weight: 66 kg (146 lb)

Sport
- Sport: Wrestling
- Event: Freestyle
- Club: Molodya Yerevan
- Coached by: Yura Babayan

Arshak Hayrapetyan (Armenian: Արշակ Հայրապէտյան, born 8 November 1978) is an Armenian Freestyle wrestler. He competed at the 2000 Summer Olympics in the men's freestyle 63 kg division, coming in 5th place.
