= Carlos Ortiz (wrestler) =

Cuban wrestler (born 1974)

Carlos Ortíz
Personal information
- Full name: Carlos Julián Ortíz Castillo
- Born: December 4, 1974 (age 51)
Medal record
Men's freestyle wrestling
Representing Cuba
Pan American Games
Silver medal – second place	1999 Winnipeg	Lightweight
Bronze medal – third place	1995 Mar del Plata	Lightweight

Carlos Julián Ortíz Castillo (born December 4, 1974) is a retired male wrestler from Cuba, who competed in the freestyle competition during his career. He twice won a medal at the Pan American Games for his native country, and competed at the 2000 Summer Olympics in Sydney, Australia in the lightweight division. There he was eliminated in the final round by Armenia's Arshak Hayrapetyan.

== Achievements ==
- 1994 World Championship: 62.0 kg. Freestyle (11th)
- 1995 Pan American Games: 62.0 kg. Freestyle (3rd)
- 1997 World Championship: 63.0 kg. Freestyle (16th)
- 1999 Pan American Games: 63.0 kg. Freestyle (2nd)
- 1999 World Championship: 63.0 kg. Freestyle (23rd)
- 2000 Summer Olympics: 63.0 kg. Freestyle (6th)
- 2002 World Championship: 66.0 kg. Freestyle (20th)
