= Sergey Smal =

Belarusian wrestler

Personal information
- Native name: Сяргей Мікалаевіч Смаль
- Born: Rechytsa, Homel, Belarus
- Height: 166 cm (5 ft 5 in)
- Weight: 68 kg (150 lb; 10 st 10 lb)

Sport
- Club: Dynamo Homel

Medal record

Men's freestyle wrestling

Representing the Unified Team

Olympic Games
Silver medal – second place	1992 Barcelona	57 kg

Representing the Soviet Union

World Championships
Gold medal – first place	1991 Varna	57 kg
Bronze medal – third place	1990 Tokyo	57 kg

Representing Belarus

World Championships
Silver medal – second place	1994 Istanbul	62 kg

Sergey Mikalayevich Smal (born 30 September 1968) is a Belarusian former wrestler, born in Rechytsa, who competed in the 1992 Summer Olympics and in the 1996 Summer Olympics.
