= Serafim Barzakov =

Bulgarian freestyle wrestler (born 1975)

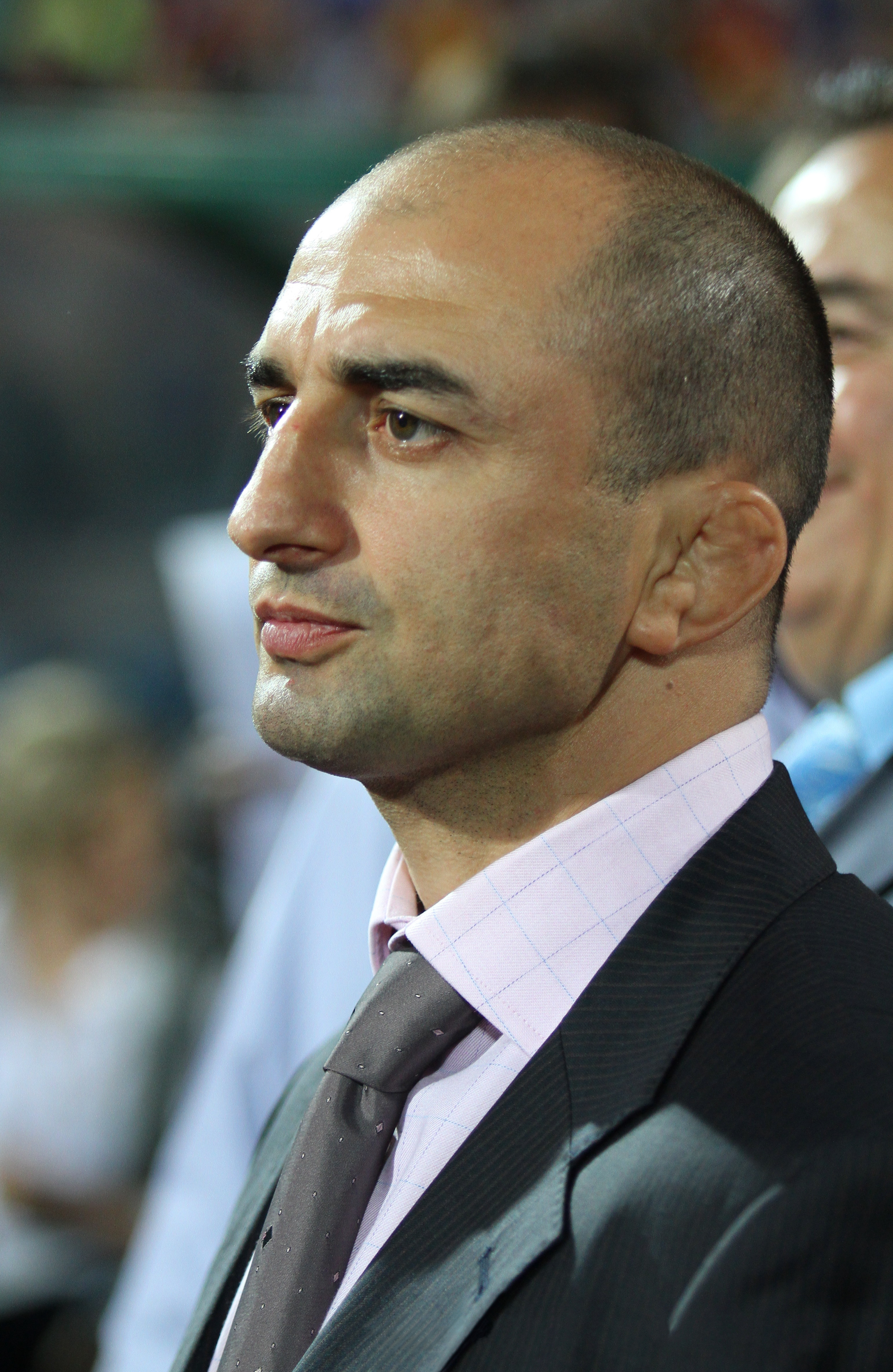

Medal record

Men's freestyle wrestling

Representing Bulgaria

Olympic Games
Silver medal – second place	2000	63 kg

World Championships
Gold medal – first place	1998	63 kg
Gold medal – first place	2001	63 kg
Silver medal – second place	2003	66 kg
Silver medal – second place	2005	66 kg

Serafim Ivanov Barzakov (Bulgarian: Серафим Иванов Бързаков; born July 22, 1975, in Kolarovo) is a male freestyle wrestler from Bulgaria. He participated in Men's freestyle 66 kg at the 2008 Summer Olympics, Men's freestyle 66 kg at the 2004 Summer Olympics, Men's freestyle 63 kg at the 2000 Summer Olympics and Men's freestyle 57 kg at the 1996 Summer Olympics.

He won a silver medal at Men's freestyle 63 kg at the 2000 Summer Olympics.

He won a gold medal on 1998 FILA Wrestling World Championships (63kg) and 2001 FILA Wrestling World Championships (63kg).

He is also a silver medalist of 2003 FILA Wrestling World Championships (66 kg) and 2005 FILA Wrestling World Championships (66 kg).

In 2019, the new sports hall named after Burzakov opened its doors in Petrich.
