= Marty Calder =

Canadian wrestler (born 1967)

Personal information
- Nationality: Canadian
- Born: January 25, 1967 (age 59) St. Catharines, Ontario
- Height: 1.68 m (5 ft 6 in)
- Weight: 68 kg (150 lb)

Sport
- Sport: Wrestling
Medal record
Men's Freestyle wrestling
Representing Canada
Commonwealth Games
| Gold medal – first place | 1994 Victoria | Featherweight |
Pan American Games
| Bronze medal – third place | 1999 Winnipeg | Featherweight |
- Updated on 6 August 2012

Martin "Marty" Calder (born January 25, 1957) is a Canadian wrestling coach for the Brock Badgers. He represented Canada in wrestling at the 1992 and 1996 Summer Olympics.
