= Șerban Mumjiev =

Romanian wrestler (born 1972)

Şerban Mumjiev (born 14 December 1972), is a Romanian former wrestler who competed in the 1996 Summer Olympics.
