= Jang Jae-sung =

South Korean freestyle wrestler

Medal record

Men's freestyle wrestling

Representing South Korea

Olympic Games
Silver medal – second place	1996 Atlanta	62 kg
Bronze medal – third place	2000 Sydney	63 kg

World Championships
Silver medal – second place	1999 Ankara	63 kg
Bronze medal – third place	2001 Sofia	69 kg

Asian Games
Gold medal – first place	1998 Bangkok	63 kg
Silver medal – second place	1994 Hiroshima	62 kg

Jang Jae-Sung (Korean: 장재성; Hanja: 張在成; born March 15, 1975, in Incheon) is a retired South Korean freestyle wrestler.

== Career ==
Jang first garnered attention in the 1992 World Junior Wrestling Championships, held in Cali, Colombia, where he won the gold medal in the freestyle 63 kg class.

Jang won the silver medal in the freestyle 62 kg class at the 1996 Summer Olympics, where he defeated reigning world champion Elbrus Tedeyev of Ukraine 3–1 in the quarterfinals but lost to Tom Brands of United States 7–0 in the gold medal match.

Jang accumulated another Olympic medal at the 2000 Summer Olympics, where he lost to eventual gold medalist Mourad Oumakhanov of Russia in the semifinals but beat 1997 world champion Mohammad Talaei of Iran in the bronze medal match.

== Post career ==
Jang participated in the 2008 Summer Olympics as an assistant coach of the South Korean national freestyle wrestling team. He currently serves as an assistant coach in the LH Wrestling Club.
