= Ramil Islamov =

Uzbekistani wrestler (born 1973)

Personal information
- Nationality: Uzbekistan, Russia
- Born: 21 August 1973 (age 52)

Sport
- Sport: Wrestling
Medal record
Men's freestyle wrestling
Representing Uzbekistan
World Championships
Bronze medal – third place	1999 Ankara	63 kg
Silver medal – second place	1997 Krasnoyarsk	58 kg
World Cup
Gold medal – first place	1996 Tehran	62 kg
Representing Russia
Russian National Championships
Silver medal – second place	2003 Moscow	60 kg
Silver medal – second place	2002 Yakutsk	60 kg
Silver medal – second place	2001 Moscow	63 kg

Ramil Islamov (born 21 August 1973) is an Uzbekistani and Russian wrestler. He competed at the 1996 Summer Olympics and the 2000 Summer Olympics. He was affiliated with CSKA Novosibirsk.

== Highlight achievements ==
- Bronze medal at World Championships, 1999
- Silver medal at World Championships, 1997
- World Cup Champion, 1996
- Two-time Asian Champion
- Three-time Russian National Championships silver medalist
- Gold medal at Espoir World Championships, 1993
