= Jürgen Scheibe =

German freestyle wrestler

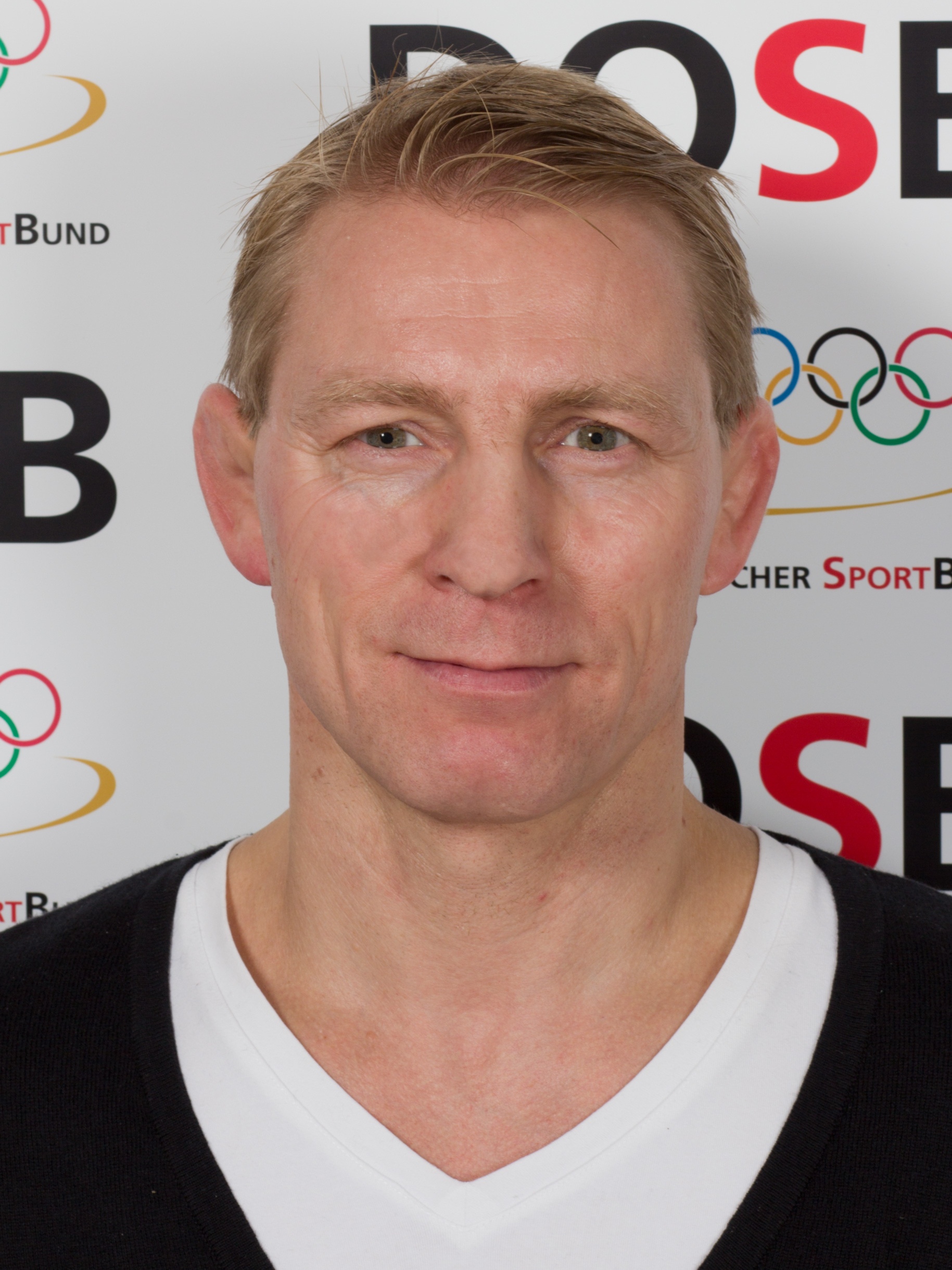
- Scheibe in 2012

Personal information
- Born: 22 October 1968 (age 57) Aschaffenburg, West Germany
- Height: 167 cm (5 ft 6 in)

Sport
- Sport: Freestyle wrestling
- Club: AC Bavaria Goldbach; VfK Schifferstadt
- Coached by: Jürgen Barleben; Gerhard Weisenberger
Medal record
Representing Germany
European Championships
Bronze medal – third place	1989 Ankara	-57 kg
Silver medal – second place	1995 Fribourg	-62 kg

Jürgen Scheibe (born 22 October 1968) is a retired German freestyle wrestler. He competed at the 1988, 1992, 1996, and 2000 Olympics with the best result of seventh place in 1992. Scheibe won two medals at the European championships, in 1989 and 1995.

Scheibe retired from competitions in 2001 to become a wrestling coach for the German women's (2001–2009) and junior men's (2009–) national teams.
