= Cary Kolat =

American wrestler (born 1973)

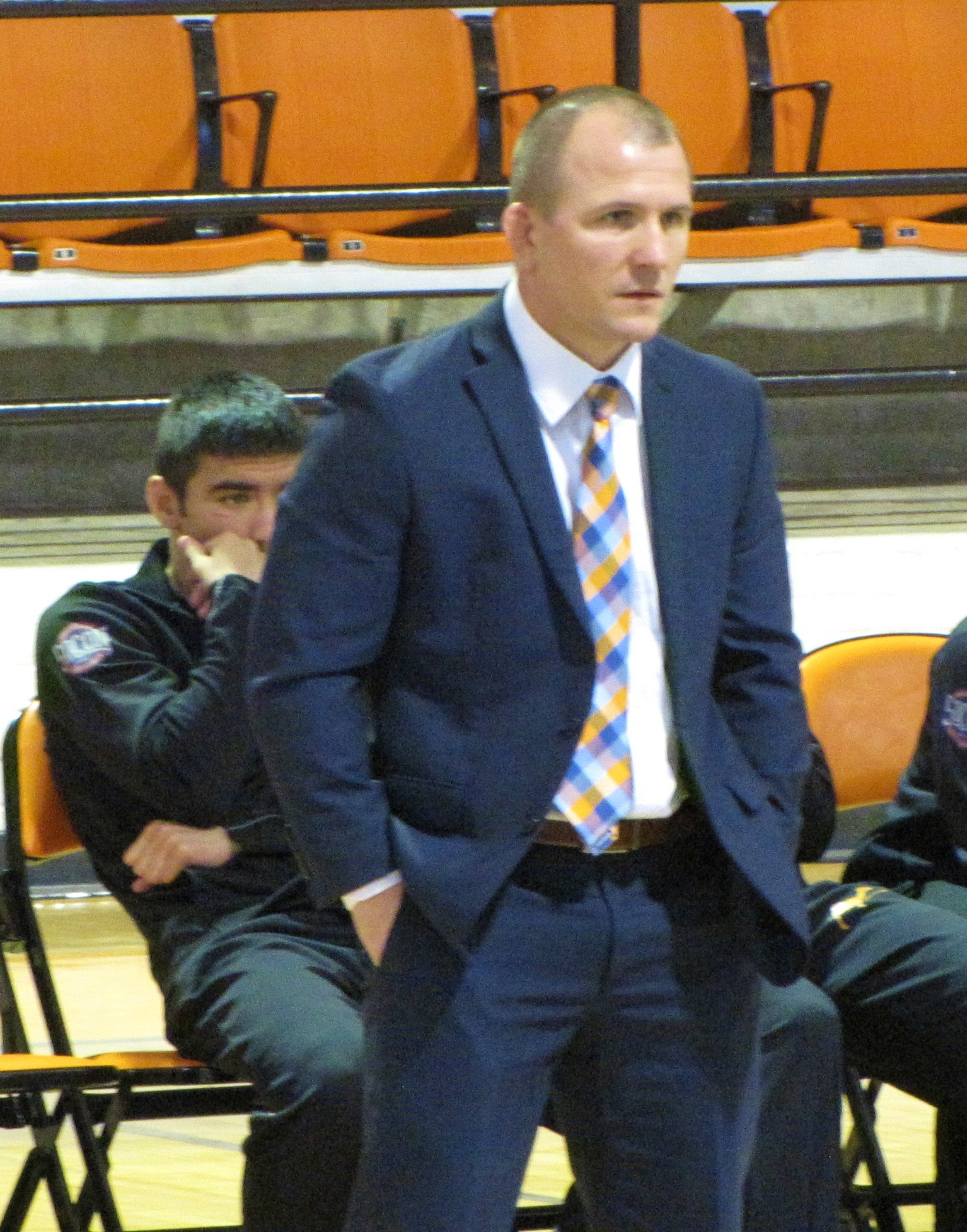
- Kolat in November 2015

Personal information
- Full name: Cary Joseph Kolat
- Born: May 19, 1973 (age 53) Rices Landing, Pennsylvania, U.S.

Sport
- Country: United States
- Sport: Wrestling
- Events: Freestyle and Folkstyle
- College team: Lock Haven; Penn State
- Club: Dave Schultz Wrestling Club
- Team: USA
Medal record
Men's freestyle wrestling
Representing the United States
World Championships
Silver medal – second place	1997 Krasnoyarsk	63 kg
Bronze medal – third place	1998 Tehran	63 kg
Pan American Games
Gold medal – first place	1999 Winnipeg	63 kg
Pan American Championships
Gold medal – first place	2000 Santiago de Cali	63 kg
Cadet World Championships
Gold medal – first place	1989 Warrensburg	55 kg
Collegiate Wrestling
NCAA Division I Championships
Representing the Lock Haven Bald Eagles
Gold medal – first place	1996 Minneapolis	134 lb
Gold medal – first place	1997 Cedar Falls	142 lb
Representing the Penn State Nittany Lions
Silver medal – second place	1993 Ames	134 lb
Bronze medal – third place	1994 Chapel Hill	134 lb

Cary Joseph Kolat (born May 19, 1973) is an American wrestler and wrestling coach who earned two NCAA championships in 1996 and 1997 for Lock Haven University of Pennsylvania and was a member of the United States Men's Freestyle Wrestling Team from 1997–2001. During that time he won silver and bronze medals at the 1997 Krasnoyarsk and 1998 Tehran FILA Wrestling World Championships, as well as competing for the United States in freestyle wrestling at the 2000 Summer Olympics. In 2017, Kolat was inducted into the National Wrestling Hall of Fame as a Distinguished Member. Kolat is currently the head wrestling coach at United States Naval Academy.

== Early life ==
Kolat was born in Rices Landing, Pennsylvania. He began wrestling at age five, and by age seven, he had won his first national championship, an AAU age-group competition in Lincoln, Nebraska. As a young child, Kolat revered Iowa wrestler Dan Gable as an inspiration. Kolat competed successfully in high school and international tournaments, finishing his career at Jefferson-Morgan High School with an undefeated 137–0 record and becoming a four-time PIAA Class AA state champion. He also won a Cadet World gold medal in freestyle wrestling at 55 kg in 1989. During this time, he was named Outstanding Wrestler four times at the state tournament, an honor no one else had achieved even twice. His achievements led to him being profiled in Sports Illustrated in April 1992.

== College career ==
In 1993, Kolat began his collegiate career at Pennsylvania State University, where he went 22–5 as a freshman and advanced to the NCAA title bout before falling to T. J. Jaworsky from University of North Carolina. The following year, Kolat earned All-America honors for the second straight season and at 134 pounds was named Big Ten Wrestler of the Year. He ended his sophomore season 39–1.

After two years at Penn State, Kolat transferred to Lock Haven University of Pennsylvania where he won his first national championship in 1996, and ended the year 25–1. Kolat picked up his first undefeated season in 1996–97 going 25–0 at 142 pounds leading to his second straight national title. During his attendance at Lock Haven, Kolat was a two-time PSAC champion (1996–97) and an Eastern Wrestling League champion in 1996–97 as well as being named the Most Outstanding Wrestler at the Eastern Wrestling League Championships in both his junior and senior seasons. He ended his college wrestling career with an impressive .941 winning percentage (111–7) and 53 career falls.

== International competition ==
After college Kolat participated in 13 international events for the United States, as member of the United States Men's Freestyle Wrestling Team from 1997–2001 at 63 kg. During that time he won a silver and a bronze medal, respectively, at the 1997 Krasnoyarsk and 1998 Tehran FILA Wrestling World Championships. He also competed for the United States in freestyle wrestling for the 2000 Summer Olympics in Sydney, Australia, where he finished ninth. Kolat was also a three-time World Cup gold medalist (1998, 1999, 2000) and World Cup silver medalist in 2001. He was also a Pan American Games gold medalist in 1999 and a Pan American gold medalist in 2000.

After much time off, Kolat returned to national freestyle competition in early 2011 at the Asics US Open, where he finished 2nd behind Teyon Ware, losing 1–0, 0–4, 1–1. In 2012, he also qualified for the 2012 US Olympic Trials.

== Coaching career ==
After his college wrestling career ended, Kolat finished his degree in criminal justice at Lock Haven, graduating in July 2003. He then served as an assistant wrestling coach at Lock Haven, Lehigh, Wisconsin, West Virginia, and North Carolina. He also runs a wrestling instructional website, called Kolat.com.

In April 2014, Kolat was named the head coach of Campbell University's wrestling program in Buies Creek, North Carolina. Kolat replaced Joe Boardwine and, after Dave Auble, is the second Olympian wrestler to serve as Campbell's head coach.

In March 2020, he was hired as head coach at the U.S. Naval Academy in Annapolis, Maryland.

== Mixed martial arts record ==
Kolat also trained with Team Quest and competed in mixed martial arts. He fought Enoch Wilson at SportFight 12 on September 16, 2005, losing by a triangle choke in the second round.

Res.	Record	Opponent	Method	Event	Date	Round	Time	Location	Notes
Loss	0–1	Enoch Wilson	Submission (Triangle Choke)	SF 12 - Breakout	September 16, 2005	2	4:06	Portland, Oregon, United States	

== Personal life ==
Kolat is married to his wife Erin and has two daughters, Zoe and Gracie, and a son, Ryder.

== See also ==
- List of Pennsylvania State University Olympians
