= Elbrus Tedeyev =

Ukrainian freestyle wrestler (born 1974)

Elbrus Tedeyev Ельбрус Тедеєв
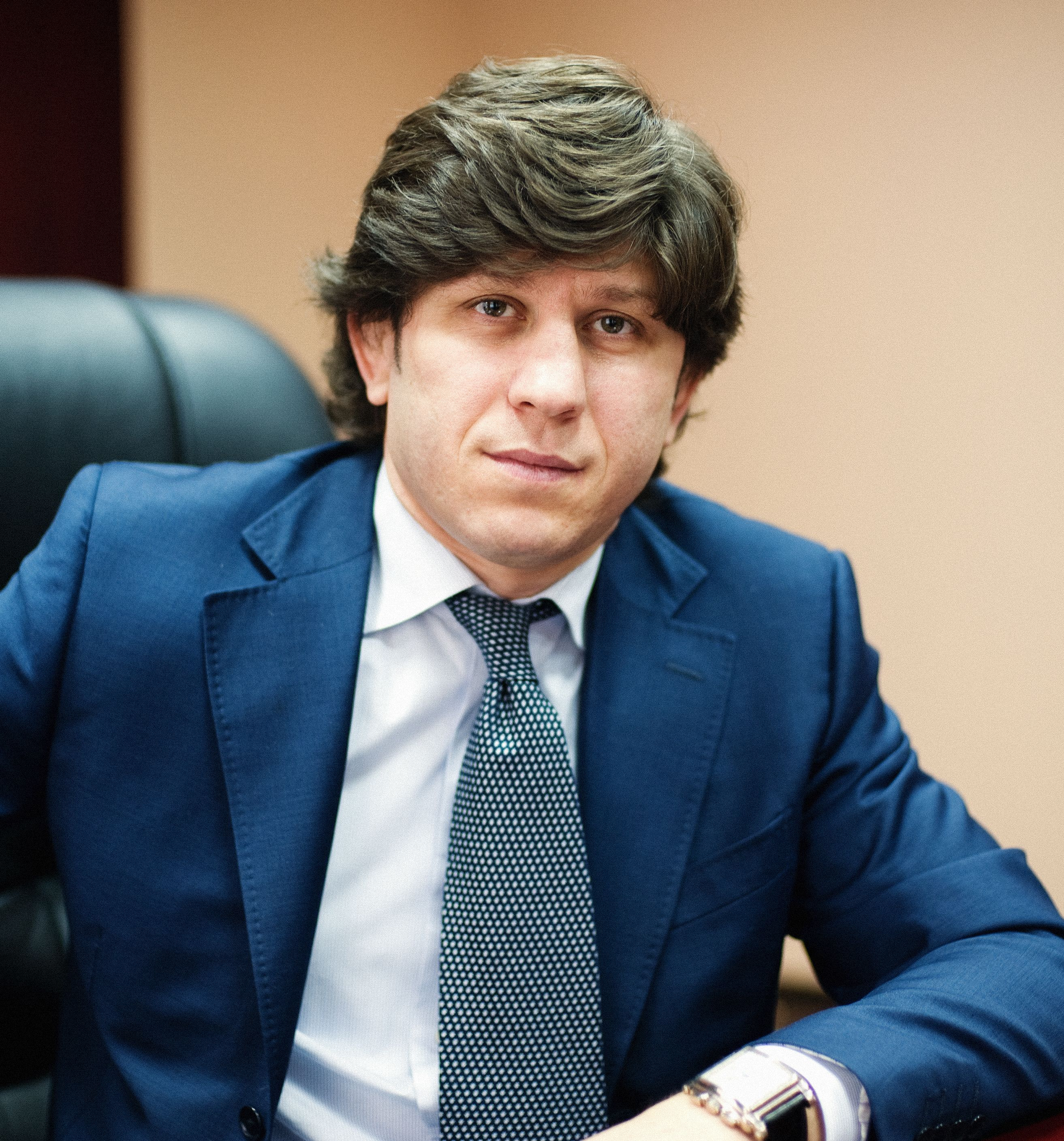

Personal information
- Nationality: Ukraine
- Born: December 5, 1974 (age 51) Nogir, North Ossetian ASSR, Russian SFSR, Soviet Union
- Height: 170 cm (5 ft 7 in)
- Weight: 66 kg (146 lb)

Sport
- Country: Ukraine
- Sport: Wrestling
- Weight class: 62-63-66 kg
- Event: Freestyle
Medal record
Men's freestyle wrestling
Representing Ukraine
Olympic Games
Gold medal – first place	2004 Athens	66 kg
Bronze medal – third place	1996 Atlanta	62 kg
World Championships
Gold medal – first place	1995 Atlanta	62 kg
Gold medal – first place	1999 Ankara	63 kg
Gold medal – first place	2002 Tehran	66 kg
Bronze medal – third place	2001 Sofia	63 kg
European Championships
Gold medal – first place	1999 Minsk	63 kg
Silver medal – second place	1997 Warsaw	63 kg
Silver medal – second place	2003 Riga	66 kg
Silver medal – second place	2004 Ankara	66 kg
Bronze medal – third place	1998 Bratislava	63 kg

Elbrus Soslanovych Tedeyev (Ukrainian: Ельбрус Сосланович Тедеєв; born December 5, 1974) is a Ukrainian wrestler.

== Career ==
He is an Olympic champion; he became a citizen of Ukraine in 1993. He won a gold medal at the 2004 Summer Olympics in Athens. He is a three-time world champion and the brother of Dzhambolat Tedeyev, who also represented Ukraine.

Tedeyev became People's Deputy of Ukraine in 2006 as an independent politician on the party list of Party of Regions, he was reelected on this list during early parliamentary elections in 2007 and again in 2012.
