= Canada at the 2004 Summer Olympics =

- IOC code: CAN
- NOC: Canadian Olympic Committee
- Website: www.olympic.ca (in English and French)

in Athens
- Competitors: 263 in 28 sports
- Flag bearer: Nicolas Gill
- Medals Ranked 21st: Gold 3 Silver 6 Bronze 3 Total 12

Summer Olympics appearances (overview)
- ~~1900~~; 1904; 1908; 1912; 1920; 1924; 1928; 1932; 1936; 1948; 1952; 1956; 1960; 1964; 1968; 1972; 1976; 1980; 1984; 1988; 1992; 1996; 2000; 2004; 2008; 2012; 2016; 2020; 2024; 2028

Other related appearances
- 1906 Intercalated Games

Canada competed at the 2004 Summer Olympics in Athens, Greece, from 13 to 29 August 2004. Canadian athletes have competed in every Summer Olympic Games since 1900, except the 1980 Summer Olympics in Moscow because of the country's support for the US-led boycott.

The Canadian Olympic Committee sent a total of 263 athletes, 130 men and 133 women, to take part in 28 sports. This was the nation's smallest delegation to the Games, since the nation boycotted the games in 1980. This had become a result of the COC changing its qualification standards, after a reduced medal showing at the 2000 Summer Olympics in Sydney, with the aim of sending fewer athletes but focusing its energy on those who have the best chance at winning medals. It has been suggested that the "logical response" of winning fewer medals was diverting funding away from sports where Canadians struggled (track and field) to ones where Canadians excelled (kayak and diving). Athletes that qualified for the Olympics would not be sent to Athens unless they had finished in the top twelve worldwide, a policy that was widely criticized as numerous Canadian Olympic medallists in past Games would have been excluded by such criteria. Over 50 Canadian athletes, including two-time Olympian marathoner Bruce Deacon, did not make the COC's "top 12" cutoff despite achieved the international qualifying standards in their respective sports. After 2004 the COC scrapped this policy but still maintains additional hurdles beyond international standards to ensure that athletes are in shape for the Olympics.

Canada left Athens with a total of 12 medals (3 golds, 6 silver, and 3 bronze), the lowest in Summer Olympic history since 1988. Canada's overall medal count had been dropping in the recent editions of the Summer Olympics, along with the totals for most developed countries as the developing nations capture comparatively more medals. Many expected Canada to win a similar number of medals as they did in 2000. Most of these medals were awarded to the athletes in canoeing, cycling, diving, and gymnastics. Sprint kayaker Adam van Koeverden became the most decorated athlete of the Games with two Olympic medals, including a gold in the men's K-1 500 m.

The flag bearer was two-time Olympic medallist Nicolas Gill, a judoka. A mild controversy developed after it was revealed that Gill had made comments in favour of Quebec separatism, and had voted yes in the 1995 Quebec referendum. Gill went on to lose his opening match and was eliminated from the tournament, which was seen as symbolic of Canada's 2004 Olympic woes.

== Medallists ==
Medal	Name	Sport	Event	Date
Gold	Kyle Shewfelt	Gymnastics	Men's floor	August 22
Gold	Lori-Ann Muenzer	Cycling	Women's sprint	August 24
Gold	Adam van Koeverden	Canoeing	Men's K-1 500 m	August 28
Silver	Karen Cockburn	Gymnastics	Women's trampoline	August 20
Silver	Cameron Baerg; Thomas Herschmiller; Jake Wetzel; Barney Williams	Rowing	Men's four	August 21
Silver	Tonya Verbeek	Wrestling	Women's freestyle 55 kg	August 23
Silver	Alexandre Despatie	Diving	Men's 3 m springboard	August 24
Silver	Marie-Hélène Prémont	Cycling	Women's cross-country	August 27
Silver	Ross MacDonald; Mike Wolfs	Sailing	Star class	August 28
Bronze	Blythe Hartley; Émilie Heymans	Diving	Women's synchronized 10 m platform	August 16
Bronze	Adam van Koeverden	Canoeing	Men's K-1 1000 m	August 27
Bronze	Caroline Brunet	Canoeing	Women's K-1 500 m	August 28

Medals by sport
Sport	1st place, gold medalist(s)	2nd place, silver medalist(s)	3rd place, bronze medalist(s)	Total
Gymnastics	1	1	0	2
Cycling	1	1	0	2
Canoeing	1	0	2	3
Diving	0	1	1	2
Sailing	0	1	0	1
Wrestling	0	1	0	1
Rowing	0	1	0	1
Total	3	6	3	12

== Archery ==
Two Canadian archers qualified each for the men's and women's individual archery.

Men

Athlete	Event	Ranking round		Round of 64	Round of 32	Round of 16	Quarterfinals	Semifinals	Final / BM	
Athlete	Event	Score	Seed	Opposition Score	Opposition Score	Opposition Score	Opposition Score	Opposition Score	Opposition Score	Rank
Jonathan Ohayon	Men's individual	632	50	Ruban (UKR); L 140–157	Did not advance					
Marie-Pier Beaudet	Women's individual	616	47	Pfohl (GER); L 128–146	Did not advance					

== Athletics ==
Canadian athletes have so far achieved qualifying standards in the following athletics events (up to a maximum of 3 athletes in each event at the 'A' Standard, and 1 at the 'B' Standard). The team was selected based on the results of the 2004 Canadian Olympic Trials.

Key

- Note–Ranks given for track events are within the athlete's heat only
- Q = Qualified for the next round
- q = Qualified for the next round as a fastest loser or, in field events, by position without achieving the qualifying target
- NR = National record
- N/A = Round not applicable for the event
- Bye = Athlete not required to compete in round

Men
Track & road events

Athlete	Event	Heat		Quarterfinal		Semifinal		Final	
Athlete	Event	Result	Rank	Result	Rank	Result	Rank	Result	Rank
Charles Allen	110 m hurdles	13.35	2 Q	13.30	2 Q	13.23	4 Q	13.48	6
Tim Berrett	50 km walk	—N/a						4:10:31	31
Pierre Browne	100 m	10.32	5 Q	10.21	6	Did not advance			
Nicolas Macrozonaris	100 m	10.40	2 Q	10.28	6	Did not advance			
Gary Reed	800 m	1:46.74	1 Q	—N/a		1:47.38	7	Did not advance	
Kevin Sullivan	1500 m	3:39.30	6 Q	—N/a		3:42.86	9	Did not advance	
Achraf Tadili	800 m	1:46.63	4	—N/a		Did not advance			
Pierre Browne; Anson Henry; Charles Henry; Nicolas Macrozonaris	4 × 100 m relay	38.64	7	—N/a				Did not advance	

Field events

Athlete	Event	Qualification		Final	
Athlete	Event	Distance	Position	Distance	Position
Mark Boswell	High jump	2.28	=1 Q	2.29	7
Bradley Snyder	Shot put	19.46	20	Did not advance	
Jason Tunks	Discus throw	61.21	15	Did not advance	

Women
Track & road events

Athlete	Event	Heat		Semifinal		Final	
Athlete	Event	Result	Rank	Result	Rank	Result	Rank
Courtney Babcock	1500 m	4:08.18	9	Did not advance			
Courtney Babcock	5000 m	15:47.35	16	—N/a		Did not advance	
Diane Cummins	800 m	2:01.19	5 Q	2:00.30	4	Did not advance	
Carmen Douma-Hussar	1500 m	4:06.90	2 Q	4:05.09	6 Q	4:02.31	9
Malindi Elmore	1500 m	4:09.81	10	Did not advance			
Perdita Felicien	100 m hurdles	12.73	2 Q	12.49	1 Q	DNF	
Priscilla Lopes-Schliep	100 m hurdles	13.08	5	Did not advance			
Émilie Mondor	5000 m	15:20.15	8	—N/a		Did not advance	
Angela Whyte	100 m hurdles	13.01	3 Q	12.69	4 Q	12.81	6

Field events

Athlete	Event	Qualification		Final	
Athlete	Event	Distance	Position	Distance	Position
Dana Ellis	Pole vault	4.40	8 Q	4.40	=6
Stephanie McCann	Pole vault	4.40	14 Q	4.40	10

== Badminton ==
Women

Athlete	Event	Round of 32	Round of 16	Quarterfinal	Semifinal	Final / BM	
Athlete	Event	Opposition Score	Opposition Score	Opposition Score	Opposition Score	Opposition Score	Rank
Charmaine Reid	Singles	Jun J-Y (KOR); L 4–11, 5–11	Did not advance				
Denyse Julien; Anna Rice	Doubles	Chankrachangwong / Thungthongkam (THA); L 3–15, 4–15	Did not advance				
Helen Nichol; Charmaine Reid	Doubles	Cheng W-H / Chien Y-C (TPE); L 0–15, 10–15	Did not advance				

Mixed

Athlete	Event	Round of 32	Round of 16	Quarterfinal	Semifinal	Final / BM	
Athlete	Event	Opposition Score	Opposition Score	Opposition Score	Opposition Score	Opposition Score	Rank
Mike Beres; Jody Patrick	Doubles	Bergström / Persson (SWE); L 17–15, 11–15, 4–15	Did not advance				
Philippe Bourret; Denyse Julien	Doubles	Petersen / Shirley (NZL); L 4–15, 6–15	Did not advance				

== Baseball ==
Canada's baseball team did very well in the initial stages of the round-robin winning their four first games. Despite losses to Japan and Cuba, they rebounded in their final game vs. Australia. Most notable has been the performance of second baseman Richard "Stubby" Clapp.

With a 5-2 record in the preliminary round, Canada finished in 3rd position, behind Japan and Cuba and ahead of Australia. In the semi-finals on August 24, Canada lost 8-5 to Cuba. Canada was leading Cuba 3-2 going into the bottom of the eighth inning but then gave up 6 runs. The game ended in dramatic fashion when Canadian Kevin Nicholson almost hit a game tying homer in the 9th. However, a heavy wind was blowing in from left field that night, which caused the ball to come down inches from the wall and was caught. Japan lost 1-0 to Australia in a surprising result in the other semifinal, almost ruining Canada's hopes for a medal in Baseball, which would later prove true as Canada lost to Japan on August 25 in the Bronze medal game, thereby finishing fourth.

Roster

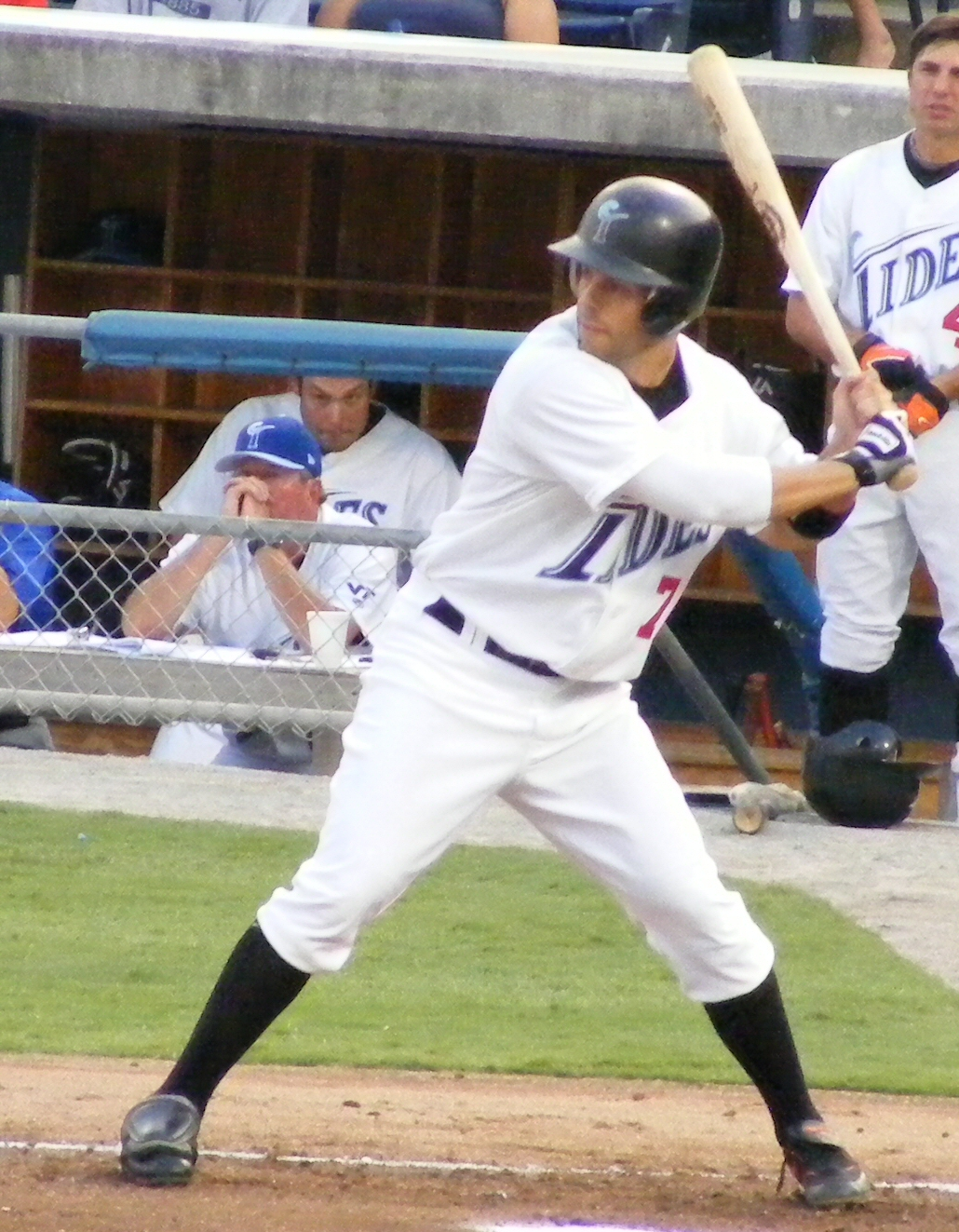
Adam Stern

Manager: 12 – Ernie Whitt

Coaches: 42 – Denis Boucher, 7 – Marty Lehn, 10 – Greg Hamilton, 21 – Tim Leiper.

Pos.	No.	Player	Date of birth (age)	Bats	Throws	Club
OF	2	Rob Ducey	24 May 1965 (aged 39)			
IF	4	Peter Orr	8 June 1979 (aged 25)			(United States) Richmond Braves
IF	11	Richard Clapp	24 February 1973 (aged 31)			(United States) Syracuse Sky Chiefs
P	13	Phil Devey	31 May 1977 (aged 27)			(United States) Long Island Ducks
P	14	Thomas Whitty	6 September 1981 (aged 22)			(United States) Durham Bulls
IF	16	Kevin Nicholson	29 March 1976 (aged 28)			(United States) Altoona Curve
IF	17	Danny Klassen	22 September 1975 (aged 28)			(United States) Toledo Mud Hens
OF	19	Adam Stern	12 February 1980 (aged 24)			(United States) Greenville Braves
IF	20	Todd Betts	24 June 1973 (aged 31)			(United States) Columbus Clippers
P	24	Shawn Hill	28 April 1981 (aged 23)			(United States) Harrisburg Senators
P	25	Mike Johnson	3 October 1975 (aged 28)			(Canada) Edmonton Trappers
OF	26	Jeremy Ware	23 October 1975 (aged 28)			(United States) Harrisburg Senators
OF	27	Jeff Guiel	12 January 1974 (aged 30)			(United States) Syracuse Sky Chiefs
C	28	Andy Stewart	5 December 1970 (aged 33)			
P	29	Jason Dickson	30 March 1973 (aged 31)			(United States) Omaha Royals
C	30	Pierre-Luc Laforest	27 January 1978 (aged 26)			(United States) Durham Bulls
P	31	Aaron Myette	26 September 1977 (aged 26)			(United States) Louisville Bats
P	32	Mike Kusiewicz	1 November 1976 (aged 27)			(United States) Indianapolis Indians
IF	33	Simon Pond	27 October 1976 (aged 27)			(United States) Syracuse Sky Chiefs
P	34	Chris Begg	8 July 1974 (aged 30)			(United States) San Jose Giants
OF	35	Ryan Radmanovich	9 August 1971 (aged 33)			(United States) Somerset Patriots
P	36	Paul Spoljaric	24 September 1970 (aged 33)			
P	37	Éric Cyr	11 February 1979 (aged 25)			(United States) Salt Lake Stingers
P	38	John Ogiltree	3 June 1978 (aged 26)			(United States) New Hampshire Fisher Cats
P	40	Chris Mears	20 January 1978 (aged 26)			(United States) Toledo Mud Hens

Round robin

Team	W	L	Tiebreaker
Japan	6	1	1-0
Cuba	6	1	0-1
Canada	5	2	-
Australia	4	3	-
Chinese Taipei	3	4	-
Netherlands	2	5	-
Greece	1	6	1-0
Italy	1	6	0-1

Team	1	2	3	4	5	6	7	8	9	R	H	E
Chinese Taipei	0	0	0	3	0	0	0	0	0	0	6	4
Canada	0	2	0	1	0	0	2	2	X	7	9	1
WP: Mike Johnson (1–0) LP: Chang Chih-Chia (0–1)

Team	1	2	3	4	5	6	7	8	9	R	H	E
Italy	1	0	0	1	0	0	0	0	1	3	9	4
Canada	2	7	0	0	0	4	0	0	X	9	6	0
WP: Jason Dickson (1–0) LP: David Rollandini (0–1); Home runs: ITA: None; CAN: Pete Laforest (1)

Team	1	2	3	4	5	6	7	8	9	R	H	E
Canada	0	3	1	3	0	0	0	0	0	7	11	0
Netherlands	0	0	0	0	0	0	0	0	0	0	3	0
WP: Shawn Hill (1–0) LP: Patrick Beljaards (0–1); Home runs: CAN: Stubby Clapp (1), Pete Orr (1), Pete Laforest (2); NED: None

Team	1	2	3	4	5	6	7	8	9	R	H	E
Canada	1	0	0	0	0	0	1	0	0	2	5	0
Greece	0	0	0	0	0	0	0	0	0	0	4	3
WP: Paul Spoljaric (1–0) LP: Meleti Ross Melehes (0–1) Sv: Aaron Myette (1)

Team	1	2	3	4	5	6	7	8	9	R	H	E
Canada	0	0	0	0	0	0	0	0	1	1	5	1
Japan	2	1	1	3	1	0	0	1	X	9	11	0
WP: Tsuyoshi Wada (1–0) LP: Mike Johnson (1–1); Home runs: CAN: None; JPN: Yoshitomo Tani (1), Yoshinobu Takahashi (1), Kazuhiro Wada (2)

Team	1	2	3	4	5	6	7	8	9	R	H	E
Cuba	0	3	0	1	0	0	0	1	0	5	10	0
Canada	0	0	0	0	0	0	2	0	0	2	7	1
WP: Norberto González (1–0) LP: Jason Dickson (1–1) Sv: Pedro Luis Lazo (2); Home runs: CUB: Antonio Scull (1); CAN: None

Team	1	2	3	4	5	6	7	8	9	R	H	E
Canada	0	0	3	2	0	0	0	0	6	11	12	0
Australia	0	0	0	0	0	0	0	0	0	0	4	2
WP: Phil Devey (1–0) LP: Adrian Burnside (0–1); Home runs: CAN: Jeremy Ware (1), Ryan Radmanovich (1); AUS: None

Semifinal

Team	1	2	3	4	5	6	7	8	9	R	H	E
Canada	0	0	1	0	2	0	0	0	2	5	9	1
Cuba	2	0	0	0	0	0	0	6	X	8	13	2
WP: Danny Betancourt (1–0) LP: Chris Begg (0–1) Sv: Norberto González (1); Home runs: CAN: Ryan Radmanovich (2); CUB: None

Bronze Medal Game

Team	1	2	3	4	5	6	7	8	9	R	H	E
Japan	2	0	4	1	0	0	0	4	0	11	13	0
Canada	0	0	0	1	1	0	0	0	0	2	5	0
WP: Tsuyoshi Wada (2–0) LP: Mike Johnson (1–2); Home runs: JPN: Kenji Johjima (2); CAN: Jeremy Ware (2)

== Boxing ==
Boxing had witnessed much controversy over the COC higher qualifying standards. After an appeal it was decided that three more boxers could go to Athens. Canada's most notable success was Benoit Gaudet defeat of Thai former champion Somluck Kamsing and Andrew Kooner who made it to the quarter-final in the Bantamweight class.

Athlete	Event	Round of 32	Round of 16	Quarterfinals	Semifinals	Final	
Athlete	Event	Opposition Result	Opposition Result	Opposition Result	Opposition Result	Opposition Result	Rank
Andrew Kooner	Bantamweight	Bye	Espinoza (VEN); W 37–20	Sultonov (UZB); L 32–44	Did not advance		
Benoit Gaudet	Featherweight	Kamsing (THA); W 32–17	Jo S-H (KOR); L 16–28	Did not advance			
Adam Trupish	Welterweight	Khairov (AZE); L RSC	Did not advance				
Jean Pascal	Middleweight	Despaigne (CUB); L 24–36	Did not advance				
Trevor Stewardson	Light heavyweight	Furtado (CPV); W 36–20	El Shamy (EGY); L 22–38	Did not advance			

== Canoeing ==
=== Slalom ===
Athlete	Event	Preliminary						Semifinal		Final			
Athlete	Event	Run 1	Rank	Run 2	Rank	Total	Rank	Time	Rank	Time	Rank	Total	Rank
James Cartwright	Men's C-1	105.79	11	105.17	10	210.96	10 Q	100.45	9	Did not advance			
David Ford	Men's K-1	101.30	18	98.57	14	199.87	16 Q	95.83	7 Q	96.75	4	192.58	4
Margaret Langford	Women's K-1	123.02	16	121.89	17	244.91	16	Did not advance					

=== Sprint ===
Men

Athlete	Event	Heats		Semifinals		Final	
Athlete	Event	Time	Rank	Time	Rank	Time	Rank
Richard Dalton	C-1 500 m	1:50.005	3 q	1:51.027	3 Q	1:48.103	6
Thomas Hall	C-1 1000 m	3:52.451	2 q	3:51.720	1 Q	3:51.457	5
Adam van Koeverden	K-1 500 m	1:37.591	1 q	1:38.907	1 Q	1:37.919	1st place, gold medalist(s)
Adam van Koeverden	K-1 1000 m	3:24.984	2 q	3:27.502	1 Q	3:28.218	3rd place, bronze medalist(s)
Attila Buday; Tamas Buday, Jr.	C-2 500 m	1:40.488	2 Q	Bye		1:41.210	8
Richard Dalton; Michael Scarola	C-2 1000 m	3:31.123	4 q	3:32.280	2 Q	3:45.638	6
Richard Dober, Jr. Steven Jorens	K-2 500 m	1:31.985	5 q	1:34.318	7	Did not advance	
Ryan Cuthbert; Richard Dober, Jr. Steven Jorens; Andrew Willows	K-4 1000 m	2:56.336	5 q	2:55.926	3 Q	3:07.714	9

Women

Athlete	Event	Heats		Semifinals		Final	
Athlete	Event	Time	Rank	Time	Rank	Time	Rank
Caroline Brunet	K-1 500 m	1:50.366	1 Q	Bye		1:50.601	3rd place, bronze medalist(s)
Mylanie Barre; Caroline Brunet	K-2 500 m	1:43.434	3 Q	Bye		1:42.833	7
Jillian D'Alessio; Karen Furneaux; Kamini Jain; Carrie Lightbound	K-4 500 m	1:36.877	5 q	1:35.465	3 Q	1:39.952	8

Qualification Legend: Q = Qualify to final; q = Qualify to semifinal

== Cycling ==
=== Road ===
Men

Athlete	Event	Time	Rank
Michael Barry	Road race	5:41:56	32
Gord Fraser	Road race	Did not finish	
Eric Wohlberg	Road race	Did not finish	
Eric Wohlberg	Time trial	1:00:31.49	18

Women

Athlete	Event	Time	Rank
Lyne Bessette	Road race	Did not finish	
Lyne Bessette	Time trial	33:24.19	16
Manon Jutras	Road race	3:25:42	30
Sue Palmer-Komar	Road race	3:25:37	11
Sue Palmer-Komar	Time trial	33:26.01	17

=== Track ===
Sprint

Athlete	Event	Qualification		Round 1	Repechage 1	Quarterfinals	Semifinals	Final	
Athlete	Event	Time Speed (km/h)	Rank	Opposition Time Speed (km/h)	Opposition Time Speed (km/h)	Opposition Time Speed (km/h)	Opposition Time Speed (km/h)	Opposition Time Speed (km/h)	Rank
Lori-Ann Muenzer	Women's sprint	11.380; 63.268	4	Reed (USA); W 11.881; 60.600	Bye	Larreal (VEN); W 12.064, W 11.888	Meares (AUS); L, W 12.101, W 12.085	Abassova (RUS); W 12.126, W 11.822	1st place, gold medalist(s)

Time trial

Athlete	Event	Time	Rank
Lori-Ann Muenzer	Women's time trial	34.268	7

=== Mountain biking ===
Athlete	Event	Time	Rank
Ryder Hesjedal	Men's cross-country	Did not finish	
Seamus McGrath	Men's cross-country	2:20:33	9
Kiara Bisaro	Women's cross-country	2:09:50	15
Marie-Hélène Prémont	Women's cross-country	1:57:50	2nd place, silver medalist(s)
Alison Sydor	Women's cross-country	1:59:47	4

== Diving ==
Canadian divers qualified for seven individual spots at the 2004 Olympic Games.

Men

Athlete	Event	Preliminaries		Semifinals		Final	
Athlete	Event	Points	Rank	Points	Rank	Points	Rank
Philippe Comtois	3 m springboard	418.32	12 Q	629.22	13	Did not advance	
Alexandre Despatie	3 m springboard	517.59	1 Q	772.32	1 Q	755.97	2nd place, silver medalist(s)
Alexandre Despatie	10 m platform	436.86	8 Q	625.14	8 Q	652.35	4
Christopher Kalec	10 m platform	429.72	12 Q	606.84	14	Did not advance	
Philippe Comtois; Alexandre Despatie	10 m synchronized platform	—N/a				351.90	5

Women

Athlete	Event	Preliminaries		Semifinals		Final	
Athlete	Event	Points	Rank	Points	Rank	Points	Rank
Blythe Hartley	3 m springboard	321.33	2 Q	550.95	3 Q	573.00	5
Émilie Heymans	3 m springboard	305.04	7 Q	531.00	8 Q	530.73	10
Myriam Boileau	10 m platform	329.64	9 Q	517.56	9 Q	530.25	7
Émilie Heymans	10 m platform	351.12	3 Q	538.17	5 Q	555.03	4
Blythe Hartley; Émilie Heymans	3 m synchronized springboard	—N/a				276.90	7
Blythe Hartley; Émilie Heymans	10 m synchronized platform	—N/a				327.78	3rd place, bronze medalist(s)

== Equestrian ==
=== Dressage ===
Athlete	Horse	Event	Grand Prix		Grand Prix Special		Grand Prix Freestyle		Overall	
Athlete	Horse	Event	Score	Rank	Score	Rank	Score	Rank	Score	Rank
Ashley Holzer	Individual	Imperioso	64.667	42	Did not advance					
Cindy Neale-Ishoy	Individual	Proton	66.583	31	Did not advance					
Leslie Reid	Individual	Mark	66.083	35	Did not advance					
Belinda Trussell	Individual	Royan II	66.000	36	Did not advance					
Ashley Holzer; Cindy Neale-Ishoy; Leslie Reid; Belinda Trussell	See above	Team	—N/a						66.222	9

=== Eventing ===
Athlete	Horse	Event	Dressage		Cross-country			Jumping						Total	
Athlete	Horse	Event	Dressage		Cross-country			Qualifier			Final			Total	
Athlete	Horse	Event	Penalties	Rank	Penalties	Total	Rank	Penalties	Total	Rank	Penalties	Total	Rank	Penalties	Rank
Hawley Bennett	Livingstone	Individual	61.20	47	94.80 #	156.00 #	32	12.00	168.00 #	39	Did not advance			168.00	39
Bruce Mandeville	Larissa	Individual	66.40 #	59	10.80	77.20	40	12.00	89.20	39	Did not advance			89.20	39
Ian Roberts	Mata-Riki	Individual	70.60 #	67	137.00 #	207.60 #	69	22.00 #	229.60 #	60	Did not advance			229.60	60
Garry Roque	Waikura	Individual	63.40	51	45.60	109.00	58	15.00 #	124.00	54	Did not advance			124.00	54
Mike Winter	Balista	Individual	63.20	50	16.80	80.00	47	8.00	88.00	25	Did not advance			88.00	25
Hawley Bennett; Bruce Mandeville; Ian Roberts; Garry Roque; Mike Winter	See above	Team	187.80	12	73.20	266.20	11	32.00	301.20	12	—N/a			301.20	12

"#" indicates that the score of this rider does not count in the team competition, since only the best three results of a team are counted.

=== Show jumping ===
Athlete	Horse	Event	Qualification								Final					Total	
Athlete	Horse	Event	Round 1		Round 2			Round 3			Round A		Round B			Total	
Athlete	Horse	Event	Penalties	Rank	Penalties	Total	Rank	Penalties	Total	Rank	Penalties	Rank	Penalties	Total	Rank	Penalties	Rank
Ian Millar	Promise Me	Individual	11	57	10	21	46 Q	10	31	42 Q	30	22	Did not advance				

== Fencing ==
Men

Athlete	Event	Round of 64	Round of 32	Round of 16	Quarterfinal	Semifinal	Final / BM	
Athlete	Event	Opposition Score	Opposition Score	Opposition Score	Opposition Score	Opposition Score	Opposition Score	Rank
Josh McGuire	Individual foil	Lau K K (HKG); W 15–14	Vanni (ITA); L 10–15	Did not advance				
Michel Boulos	Individual sabre	Bye	Ferjancsik (HUN); L 8–15	Did not advance				

Women

Athlete	Event	Round of 64	Round of 32	Round of 16	Quarterfinal	Semifinal	Final / BM	
Athlete	Event	Opposition Score	Opposition Score	Opposition Score	Opposition Score	Opposition Score	Opposition Score	Rank
Catherine Dunnette	Individual épée	Gómez (CUB); L 9–11	Did not advance					
Monique Kavelaars	Individual épée	Barlow (RSA); W 14–8	Li N (CHN); L 11–15	Did not advance				
Sherraine Schalm-MacKay	Individual épée	Bye	Khristou (GRE); L 13–15	Did not advance				
Catherine Dunnette; Monique Kavelaars; Julie Leprohon; Sherraine Schalm-MacKay	Team épée	—N/a			Hungary; W 38–37	Russia; L 18–25	France; L 37–45	4

== Gymnastics ==
=== Artistic ===
Prior to 2004, Canada had never won an Olympic medal in artistic gymnastics, and hopes for a first seemed to be dashed when the main medal threat, double World Championships bronze medallist Kyle Shewfelt suffered an ankle injury in March. By the Games, though, Shewfelt's injury had healed to the point where it did not adversely affect his performance.

Men
Team

Athlete	Event	Qualification								Final							
Athlete	Event	Apparatus						Total	Rank	Apparatus						Total	Rank
Athlete	Event	F	PH	R	V	PB	HB	Total	Rank	F	PH	R	V	PB	HB	Total	Rank
Grant Golding	Team	9.512	9.262	9.650	9.125	8.962	8.500	55.011	31	Did not advance							
Ken Ikeda	Team	—N/a	8.900	—N/a	8.937	8.687	—N/a			Did not advance							
Sasha Jeltkov	Team	9.175	7.600	8.562	8.900	8.787	9.625	52.649	45	Did not advance							
David Kikuchi	Team	8.825	9.412	9.500	—N/a	9.625	9.075	—N/a		Did not advance							
Kyle Shewfelt	Team	9.737 Q	—N/a	8.112	9.687 Q	—N/a	9.212	—N/a		Did not advance							
Adam Wong	Team	9.325	9.237	9.112	9.137	9.262	9.087	55.160	29	Did not advance							
Total	Team	37.749	36.811	36.824	36.886	36.636	36.999	221.905	11	Did not advance							

Individual finals

Athlete	Event	Apparatus						Total	Rank
Athlete	Event	F	PH	R	V	PB	HB	Total	Rank
Kyle Shewfelt	Floor	9.787	—N/a					9.787	1st place, gold medalist(s)
Kyle Shewfelt	Vault	—N/a			9.599	—N/a		9.599	4

Women
Team

Athlete	Event	Qualification						Final					
Athlete	Event	Apparatus				Total	Rank	Apparatus				Total	Rank
Athlete	Event	V	UB	BB	F	Total	Rank	V	UB	BB	F	Total	Rank
Melanie Banville	Team	9.200	9.062	9.025	9.362	36.649	22 Q	Did not advance					
Gael Mackie	Team	—N/a	9.100	—N/a				Did not advance					
Amelie Plante	Team	9.112	9.475	8.075	9.287	35.949	38	Did not advance					
Heather Mary Purnell	Team	9.200	8.712	8.500	9.287	35.812	40	Did not advance					
Kate Richardson	Team	9.212	9.275	9.175	9.562 Q	37.224	14 Q	Did not advance					
Kylie Stone	Team	9.137	—N/a	8.975	8.912	—N/a		Did not advance					
Total	Team	36.749	36.912	35.675	37.611	146.947	10	Did not advance					

Individual finals

Athlete	Event	Apparatus				Total	Rank
Athlete	Event	F	V	UB	BB	Total	Rank
Melanie Banville	All-around	9.200	8.025	8.787	8.462	34.474	24
Kate Richardson	All-around	9.262	8.087	9.037	9.400	35.786	18
Kate Richardson	Floor	9.312	—N/a			9.312	7

=== Trampoline ===
Athlete	Event	Qualification		Final	
Athlete	Event	Score	Rank	Score	Rank
Mathieu Turgeon	Men's	63.40	11	Did not advance	
Karen Cockburn	Women's	65.10	5 Q	39.20	2nd place, silver medalist(s)
Heather Ross-McManus	Women's	63.80	6 Q	37.40	6

== Judo ==
Six Canadian judoka (two men and four women) qualified for the 2004 Summer Olympics.

Men

Athlete	Event	Round of 32	Round of 16	Quarterfinals	Semifinals	Repechage 1	Repechage 2	Repechage 3	Final / BM	
Athlete	Event	Opposition Result	Opposition Result	Opposition Result	Opposition Result	Opposition Result	Opposition Result	Opposition Result	Opposition Result	Rank
Keith Morgan	−90 kg	Fallah (IRI); W 1002–0111	Mesbah (EGY); W 0011–0001	Hwang H-T (KOR); L 0000–0200	Did not advance	Bye	Huizinga (NED); L 0000–1012	Did not advance		
Nicolas Gill	−100 kg	Monti (ITA); L 0001–1003	Did not advance							

Women

Athlete	Event	Round of 32	Round of 16	Quarterfinals	Semifinals	Repechage 1	Repechage 2	Repechage 3	Final / BM	
Athlete	Event	Opposition Result	Opposition Result	Opposition Result	Opposition Result	Opposition Result	Opposition Result	Opposition Result	Opposition Result	Rank
Carolyne Lepage	−48 kg	Bye	Matijass (GER); L 0010–0000	Did not advance		Ye G-R (KOR); L 0000–0011	Did not advance			
Marie-Hélène Chisholm	−63 kg	von Harnier (GER); W 1000–0001	Li Sf (CHN); W 0010–0000	Tanimoto (JPN); L 0000–1000	Did not advance	Bye	Dhahri (TUN); W 1000–0000	Décosse (FRA); W 1010–0001	Žolnir (SLO); L 0100_{2}–0100_{3}	5
Catherine Roberge	−70 kg	Bye	Howey (GBR); W 0010–0001	Böhm (GER); L 0000–0011	Did not advance	Bye	Qin Dy (CHN); L 0000–1001	Did not advance		
Amy Cotton	−78 kg	Engoang (GAB); W 1000–0000	Morico (ITA); L 0000–1010	Did not advance						

== Modern pentathlon ==
Two Canadian athletes qualified to compete in the modern pentathlon event.

Athlete	Event	Shooting (10 m air pistol)			Fencing (épée one touch)			Swimming (200 m freestyle)			Riding (show jumping)			Running (3000 m)			Total points	Final rank
Athlete	Event	Points	Rank	MP Points	Results	Rank	MP points	Time	Rank	MP points	Penalties	Rank	MP points	Time	Rank	MP Points	Total points	Final rank
Kara Grant	Women's	169	20	964	16–15	=12	832	2:43.37	32	960	104	18	1096	11:01.57	5	1076	4928	22
Monica Pinette	Women's	178	10	1072	20–11	4	944	2:32.62	30	1092	168	21	1032	11:30.55	22	960	5100	13

== Rowing ==
Canada's most heralded team going into Athens was its rowers, and there was considerable hope for success by Canadians with expectations of three medals or more. While the Canadians did well, with a number of finals appearances, only one group won medals the men's fours of Cam Baerg, Jake Wetzel, Thomas Herschmiller and Barney Williams won the silver medal in the men's four rowing final, losing to Great Britain by only 0.08 seconds.

Most disappointing was the men's eights who had been undefeated for two years before the Olympics, but to the surprise of many finished fifth in their event.

Controversy broke out over the rowing team of Dave Calder and Chris Jarvis who were disqualified from the men's pairs semifinal race for entering another team's lane, and thus failed to qualify for the final. The COC appealed the decision, but it was upheld.

Men

Athlete	Event	Heats		Repechage		Semifinals		Final	
Athlete	Event	Time	Rank	Time	Rank	Time	Rank	Time	Rank
Dave Calder; Chris Jarvis	Pair	6:56.23	2 SA/B	Bye		DSQ		DNS	
Cameron Baerg; Thomas Herschmiller; Jake Wetzel; Barney Williams	Four	6:28.36	1 SA/B	Bye		5:50.68	1 FA	6:07.06	2nd place, silver medalist(s)
Jon Beare; Iain Brambell; Gavin Hassett; Jon Mandick	Lightweight four	5:51.18	2 SA/B	Bye		5:57.44	3 FA	6:05.10	5
Scott Frandsen; Kyle Hamilton; Andrew Hoskins; Adam Kreek; Kevin Light; Jeff Powell; Brian Price (cox); Ben Rutledge; Joe Stankevicius	Eight	5:20.46	1 R	5:32.51	1 FA	—N/a		5:51.66	5

Women

Athlete	Event	Heats		Repechage		Semifinals		Final	
Athlete	Event	Time	Rank	Time	Rank	Time	Rank	Time	Rank
Buffy Alexander-Williams; Darcy Marquardt	Pair	7:42.36	2 R	7:08.32	1 FA	—N/a		7:13.33	4
Mara Jones; Fiona Milne	Lightweight double sculls	6:53.47	2 R	6:54.04	2 SA/B	6:56.64	4 FB	7:26.07	8
Karen Clark; Jacqui Cook; Anna-Marie de Zwager; Sabrina Kolker; Roslyn McLeod; Andréanne Morin; Sarah Pape (cox); Romina Stefancic; Pauline van Roessel	Eight	6:12:40	3 R	6:15.18	5	—N/a		Did not advance	7

Qualification Legend: FA=Final A (medal); FB=Final B (non-medal); FC=Final C (non-medal); FD=Final D (non-medal); FE=Final E (non-medal); FF=Final F (non-medal); SA/B=Semifinals A/B; SC/D=Semifinals C/D; SE/F=Semifinals E/F; R=Repechage

== Sailing ==
Canadian sailors have qualified one boat for each of the following events.

Men

Athlete	Event	Race											Net points	Final rank
Athlete	Event	1	2	3	4	5	6	7	8	9	10	M*	Net points	Final rank
Richard Clarke	Finn	10	18	15	22	19	15	~~OCS~~	14	8	11	2	134	18
Ross MacDonald; Mike Wolfs	Star	7	11	4	3	1	RDG	8	~~14~~	8	2	2	51.2	2nd place, silver medalist(s)

Women

Athlete	Event	Race											Net points	Final rank
Athlete	Event	1	2	3	4	5	6	7	8	9	10	M*	Net points	Final rank
Nikola Girke; Jen Provan	470	4	13	17	11	12	7	2	~~19~~	6	19	12	103	13
Deirdre Crampton; Chantal Léger; Lisa Ross	Yngling	13	9	~~15~~	15	12	12	12	14	15	2	12	116	17

Open

Athlete	Event	Race											Net points	Final rank
Athlete	Event	1	2	3	4	5	6	7	8	9	10	M*	Net points	Final rank
Bernard Luttmer	Laser	15	25	22	21	27	33	31	~~DNF~~	9	32	30	245	29
John Curtis; Oskar Johansson	Tornado	14	15	4	13	8	12	14	~~17~~	17	4	13	114	15

M = Medal race; OCS = On course side of the starting line; DSQ = Disqualified; DNF = Did not finish; DNS= Did not start; RDG = Redress given

== Shooting ==
Two Canadian shooters qualified to compete in the following events:

Women

Athlete	Event	Qualification		Final	
Athlete	Event	Points	Rank	Points	Rank
Cynthia Meyer	Trap	52	16	Did not advance	
Cynthia Meyer	Double trap	101	11	Did not advance	
Susan Nattrass	Trap	61	5 Q	76	6
Susan Nattrass	Double trap	88	15	Did not advance	

== Softball ==
The Canadian softball team finished the preliminary round with the same record as China, but had lost to China 4-2 in head-to-head play and therefore received 5th place and did not advance to the semifinals while China placed 4th and moved on.

Team Roster

Position	No.	Player	Birth	Club in 2004
IF	2	Erin White	OCT/27/1977	Team Canada
P	3	Lauren Bay	AUG/09/1981	White Rock Renegades (British Columbia)
IF	4	Sheena Lawrick	JUN/22/1983	Calgary Double Diamonds Renegades
OF	6	Rachel Schill	JUN/09/1982	Simon Fraser University
OF	7	Sasha Olson	SEP/23/1976	Delta Heat (British Columbia)
IF	9	Cindy Eadie	SEP/21/1982	Markham Tigers
IF	10	Kristy Odamura	OCT/03/1977	Team Canada
IF	11	Angela Lichty	DEC/30/1979	Delta Heat (British Columbia)
P	15	Ani Nyhus	AUG/18/1983	White Rock Renegades (British Columbia)
OF	17	Alison Bradley	APR/27/1979	Brampton Blazers (Ontario)
C	18	Erin Cumpstone	NOV/04/1980	Burnaby (British Columbia)
C	22	Kim Sarrazin	SEP/17/1977	Team Canada
P	24	Auburn Sigurdson	APR/06/1981	White Rock Renegades (British Columbia)
P	27	Kaila Holtz	SEP/26/1981	Team Canada
OF	32	Jackie Lance	MAY/09/1974	White Rock Renegades (British Columbia)
Bench Coaches
Team; Manager		Mike Renney	SEP/10/1964
Coach		Glenn Boles	MAR/24/1951
Coach		Patrick Murphy	NOV/28/1965

Preliminary round

Team	Pld	W	L	RF	RA	Pct
United States	7	7	0	41	0	1.000
Australia	7	6	1	22	14	0.857
Japan	7	4	3	17	8	0.571
China	7	3	4	15	20	0.429
Canada	7	3	4	6	14	0.429
Chinese Taipei	7	2	5	3	13	0.286
Greece	7	2	5	6	24	0.286
Italy	7	1	6	8	24	0.143

Team	1	2	3	4	5	6	7	R	H	E
Chinese Taipei	0	0	0	0	0	0	0	0	4	1
Canada	0	0	0	2	0	0	X	2	5	0
WP: Lauren Bay (1–0) LP: Wu Chia-Yen (0–1)

Team	1	2	3	4	5	6	7	R	H	E
Canada	0	0	0	0	0	0	0	0	3	4
Greece	0	1	0	0	1	0	0	2	3	0
WP: Sarah Farnworth (1–0) LP: Kaila Holtz (0–1)

Team	1	2	3	4	5	6	7	R	H	E
China	0	0	0	0	0	4	0	4	4	0
Canada	0	0	0	2	0	0	0	2	4	2
WP: Zhang Lixia (1–0) LP: Lauren Bay (1–1)

Team	1	2	3	4	5	6	7	8	R	H	E
Canada	0	0	0	0	0	0	0	1	1	1	2
Japan	0	0	0	0	0	0	0	0	0	3	1
WP: Lauren Bay (2–1) LP: Yukiko Ueno (0-2)

Team	1	2	3	4	5	R	H	E
Canada	0	0	0	0	0	0	1	1
United States	1	2	1	2	1	7	11	1
WP: Jennie Finch (2–0) LP: Auburn Sigurdson (0–1); Home runs: CAN: None; USA: Crystl Bustos (2), Lisa Fernandez (1)

Team	1	2	3	4	5	6	7	R	H	E
Australia	0	1	0	0	0	0	0	1	4	0
Canada	0	0	0	0	0	0	0	0	5	0
WP: Melanie Roche (3–0) LP: Lauren Bay (2–2)

Team	1	2	3	4	5	6	7	R	H	E
Italy	0	0	0	0	0	0	0	0	2	0
Canada	0	0	0	1	0	0	X	1	1	1
WP: Lauren Bay (3–2) LP: Susan Bugliarello (0–3)

== Swimming ==
For the first time in decades Canada did not win a single medal in swimming. This led to calls for the resignation of head coach Dave Johnson by a number of former swimmers, most notably Barcelona gold medallist Mark Tewksbury. Swim Canada focused on personal bests rather than medals, but even by that measure Canada fared poorly. This lack of medals also stood in sharp contrast to Canada's sibling dominion Australia which won many medals in swimming, as they did in Sydney. There were a few bright spots, including Rick Say making it to the finals of the 200 m freestyle, considered by many to be the premier event of the 2004 Olympics, and a number of Canadian records were set. Generally though, performances by the swim team were slower than the times they had swum at Canadian Olympic trials 2 weeks before.

Rick Say created a minor controversy after the 4×200-metre freestyle relay immediately in the post-race interview which was aired live on national television, when he said that he was "pissed off at not being able to make up for my teammates' mistakes". The other three team members - Brent Hayden, Brian Johns, and Andrew Hurd - expressed disappointment not in the effort, which broke the Canadian record by over 3.5 seconds, but only in the 5th-place finish which was out of the medals.

Men

Athlete	Event	Heat		Semifinal		Final	
Athlete	Event	Time	Rank	Time	Rank	Time	Rank
Keith Beavers	200 m backstroke	2:00.97	13 Q	1:59.98	12	Did not advance	
Keith Beavers	400 m individual medley	4:21.47	16	—N/a		Did not advance	
Mike Brown	200 m breaststroke	2:12.69	4 Q	2:12.14	6 Q	2:11.94	6
Scott Dickens	100 m breaststroke	1:02.16	19	Did not advance			
Brent Hayden	100 m freestyle	DNS		Did not advance			
Brent Hayden	200 m freestyle	1:49.56	14 Q	1:50.00	13	Did not advance	
Andrew Hurd	400 m freestyle	3:50.81	13	—N/a		Did not advance	
Andrew Hurd	1500 m freestyle	15:28.71	18	—N/a		Did not advance	
Brian Johns	200 m individual medley	2:03.95	28	Did not advance			
Brian Johns	400 m individual medley	4:21.10	15	—N/a		Did not advance	
Mark Johnston	400 m freestyle	3:54.27	22	—N/a		Did not advance	
Morgan Knabe	100 m breaststroke	1:02.13	18	Did not advance			
Morgan Knabe	200 m breaststroke	2:17.20	29	Did not advance			
Mike Mintenko	100 m butterfly	52.96	14 Q	52.89	12	Did not advance	
Nathaniel O'Brien	200 m backstroke	2:00.49	10 Q	2:00.13	14	Did not advance	
Nathaniel O'Brien	200 m butterfly	2:00.12	23	Did not advance			
Matthew Rose	50 m freestyle	23.01	30	Did not advance			
Matthew Rose	100 m backstroke	56.62	27	Did not advance			
Rick Say	100 m freestyle	DNS		Did not advance			
Rick Say	200 m freestyle	1:49.32	10 Q	1:48.16	8 Q	1:47.55	6
Brent Hayden; Riley Janes; Yannick Lupien; Mike Mintenko	4 × 100 m freestyle relay	3:18.35	9	—N/a		Did not advance	
Brent Hayden; Andrew Hurd; Brian Johns; Mark Johnston*; Rick Say	4 × 200 m freestyle relay	7:18.05	5 Q	—N/a		7:13.33	5
Mike Brown; Brent Hayden; Riley Janes; Mike Mintenko	4 × 100 m medley relay	3:39.36	10	—N/a		Did not advance	

Women

Athlete	Event	Heat		Semifinal		Final	
Athlete	Event	Time	Rank	Time	Rank	Time	Rank
Jennifer Fratesi	200 m backstroke	2:13.00	6 Q	2:12.64	9	Did not advance	
Erin Gammel	100 m backstroke	1:02.47	17	Did not advance			
Rhiannon Leier	100 m breaststroke	1:09.38	9 Q	1:09.46	12	Did not advance	
Brittany Reimer	200 m freestyle	2:01.39	17	Did not advance			
Brittany Reimer	400 m freestyle	4:12.33	16	—N/a		Did not advance	
Brittany Reimer	800 m freestyle	8:41.55	17	—N/a		Did not advance	
Lauren van Oosten	100 m breaststroke	1:09.93	13 Q	1:09.45	11	Did not advance	
Lauren van Oosten	200 m breaststroke	2:30.44	14 Q	2:30.39	13	Did not advance	
Elizabeth Warden	200 m backstroke	2:15.77	18	Did not advance			
Elizabeth Warden	200 m individual medley	2:17.12	15 Q	2:17.32	15	Did not advance	
Elizabeth Warden	400 m individual medley	4:46.27	11	—N/a		Did not advance	
Jennifer Fratesi; Erin Gammel; Lauren van Oosten; Brittany Reimer	4 × 100 m medley relay	4:09.84	11	—N/a		Did not advance	

== Synchronized swimming ==
Nine Canadian synchronized swimmers qualified a spot in the women's team.

Athlete	Event	Technical routine		Free routine (preliminary)			Free routine (final)		
Athlete	Event	Points	Rank	Points	Total (technical + free)	Rank	Points	Total (technical + free)	Rank
Fanny Létourneau; Courtenay Stewart	Duet	47.500	6	46.667	95.251	5 Q	47.834	95.334	6
Erin Chan; Jessica Chase; Jessika Dubuc; Marie-Pierre Gagné; Fanny Létourneau; Shayna Nackoney; Anouk Renière-Lafrenière; Courtenay Stewart	Team	47.584	5	—N/a			47.667	95.251	5

== Table tennis ==
Four Canadian table tennis players qualified for the following events.

Athlete	Event	Round 1	Round 2	Round 3	Round 4	Quarterfinals	Semifinals	Final / BM	
Athlete	Event	Opposition Result	Opposition Result	Opposition Result	Opposition Result	Opposition Result	Opposition Result	Opposition Result	Rank
Wenguan Johnny Huang	Men's singles	Bye	Karakašević (SCG); L 2–4	Did not advance					
Wenguan Johnny Huang; Faazil Kassam	Men's doubles	—N/a	Brown / Lavale (AUS); W 4–0	Persson / Waldner (SWE); L 2–4	Did not advance				
Petra Cada	Women's singles	Guenni (TUN); W 4–0	Bátorfi (HUN); W 4–3	Li Jw (SIN); L 0–4	Did not advance				
Petra Cada; Marie-Christine Roussy	Women's doubles	Bye	Mirou / Volakaki (GRE); W 4–1	Ganina / Palina (RUS); L 0–4	Did not advance				

== Taekwondo ==
Two Canadian taekwondo jin qualified for the following events.

Athlete	Event	Round of 16	Quarterfinals	Semifinals	Repechage 1	Repechage 2	Final / BM	
Athlete	Event	Opposition Result	Opposition Result	Opposition Result	Opposition Result	Opposition Result	Opposition Result	Rank
Ivett Gonda	Women's −49 kg	Anwar (EGY); W 3–2	Contreras (VEN); W 3–2	Chen S-H (TPE); L 2–3	Bye	Boorapolchai (THA); L −1–2	Did not advance	5
Dominique Bosshart	Women's +67 kg	Baverel (FRA); L 5–7	Did not advance		Castrignano (ITA); L 3–6	Did not advance		

== Tennis ==
Canadian Tennis Association nominated two male tennis players to compete in the tennis tournament.

Athlete	Event	Round of 64	Round of 32	Round of 16	Quarterfinals	Semifinals	Final / BM	
Athlete	Event	Opposition Score	Opposition Score	Opposition Score	Opposition Score	Opposition Score	Opposition Score	Rank
Frédéric Niemeyer	Men's singles	Dent (USA); L 2–6, 6–3, 4–6	Did not advance					
Daniel Nestor; Frédéric Niemeyer	Men's doubles	—N/a	Beck / Hrbatý (SVK); W 6–2, 7–5	Llodra / Santoro (FRA); L 3–6, 7–6^{(7–5)}, 3–6	Did not advance			

== Triathlon ==
Canada had a strong triathlon program, including the defending men's gold medallist Simon Whitfield, who won surprisingly in Sydney. The women's race was something of a disappointment, as top-ranked Canadian Jill Savege, who came out of the water in fifth place, crashed in the bicycle stage and only finished 39th. The two other Canadian women did not fare much better. In the men's triathlon a day later Whitfield finished a respectable 11th.

Athlete	Event	Swim (1.5 km)	Trans 1	Bike (40 km)	Trans 2	Run (10 km)	Total Time	Rank
Brent McMahon	Men's	18:30	0:17	1:05:08	0:19	35:30	1:59:44.57	39
Simon Whitfield	Men's	18:21	0:20	1:02:15	0:20	31:59	1:53:15.81	11
Samantha McGlone	Women's	21:27	0:18	1:11:41	0:23	36:25	2:10:14.24	27
Carol Montgomery	Women's	19:52	0:23	1:15:11	0:26	39:33	2:15:25.62	35
Jill Savege	Women's	18:44	0:20	1:19:52	0:26	38:48	2:18:10.99	39

== Volleyball ==
=== Beach ===
Athlete	Event	Preliminary round	Standing	Round of 16	Quarterfinals	Semifinals	Final	
Athlete	Event	Opposition Score	Standing	Opposition Score	Opposition Score	Opposition Score	Opposition Score	Rank
John Child; Mark Heese	Men's	Pool E Heuscher – Kobel (SUI); L 0 – 2 (26–28, 18–21); Blanton – Nygaard (USA); W 2 – 0 (21–16, 21–10); Prosser – Williams (AUS); L 1 – 2 (13–21, 21–15, 12–15)	3 Q	Baracetti – Conde (ARG); W 2 – 0 (21–17, 21–17)	Bosma – Herrera (ESP); L 1 – 2 (24–22, 19–21, 16–18)	Did not advance		
Guylaine Dumont; Annie Martin	Women's	Pool D Kuhn – Schnyder (SUI); W 2 – 0 (21–16, 21–13); McPeak – Youngs (USA); L 1 – 2 (13–21, 21–12, 9–15); Glesnes – Maaseide (NOR); W 2 – 0 (21–19, 29–27)	2 Q	Fernández – Larrea (CUB); W 2 – 0 (21–18, 21–19)	May – Walsh (USA); L 0 – 2 (19–21, 14–21)	Did not advance		

== Water polo ==
Canada's women's water polo team fared poorly, despite beating the number one ranked team from the United States during the round robin. Losing the other two games in the preliminary round put Canada in last place in the pool and eliminated the team from medal contention. They would end up finishing seventh.

=== Women's tournament ===
Roster

The following is the Canadian roster in the women's water polo tournament of the 2004 Summer Olympics.

Head coach: Patrick Oaten

№	Name	Pos.	Height	Weight	Date of birth	2004 club
1	Whynter Lamarre	GK	1.73 m (5 ft 8 in)	68 kg (150 lb)	14 January 1979	(Canada) Dollard Water Polo Club
2	Rachel Riddell	GK	1.83 m (6 ft 0 in)	66 kg (146 lb)	5 September 1984	(Canada) Pacific Storm Water Polo
3	Marianne Illing	D	1.74 m (5 ft 9 in)	67 kg (148 lb)	12 February 1974	(Canada) Ottawa Titans
4	Susan Gardiner	CF	1.90 m (6 ft 3 in)	95 kg (209 lb)	13 April 1980	(Canada) Pacific Storm Water Polo
5	Andrea Dewar	CF	1.78 m (5 ft 10 in)	66 kg (146 lb)	9 July 1979	(Canada) Dollard Water Polo Club
6	Marie Luc Arpin	D	1.73 m (5 ft 8 in)	68 kg (150 lb)	4 July 1978	(Canada) Sainte-Foy
7	Cora Campbell	D	1.78 m (5 ft 10 in)	62 kg (137 lb)	28 May 1974	(Canada) Calgary Renegades
8	Melissa Collins	D	1.65 m (5 ft 5 in)	61 kg (134 lb)	25 September 1976	(Canada) Dollard Water Polo Club
9	Ann Dow (C)	CB	1.64 m (5 ft 5 in)	59 kg (130 lb)	1 May 1971	(Canada) Club Aquatique de Montreal
10	Jana Salat	CB	1.74 m (5 ft 9 in)	67 kg (148 lb)	6 April 1979	(Canada) Sainte-Foy
11	Valérie Dionne	D	1.73 m (5 ft 8 in)	72 kg (159 lb)	29 July 1980	(Canada) Sainte-Foy
12	Christine Robinson	CF	1.80 m (5 ft 11 in)	80 kg (180 lb)	17 May 1984	(Canada) Dollard Water Polo Club
13	Johanne Bégin	CF	1.80 m (5 ft 11 in)	81 kg (179 lb)	21 October 1971	(Canada) Sainte-Foy

Group play

Pos	Team	Pld	W	D	L	GF	GA	GD	Pts	Qualification
1	United States	3	2	0	1	20	16	+4	4	Qualified for the Semifinals
2	Russia	3	2	0	1	21	22	−1	4	Qualified for the Quarterfinals
3	Hungary	3	1	0	2	19	20	−1	2	Qualified for the Quarterfinals
4	Canada	3	1	0	2	16	18	−2	2	

16 August 2004; 16:30	Report	Russia	8–6	Canada	Athens Olympic Aquatic Centre; Referees: Erhan Tulga (TUR); Torsten Bock (GER)
16 August 2004; 16:30	Report	Score by quarters: 1–2, 3–0, 2–3, 2–1			Athens Olympic Aquatic Centre; Referees: Erhan Tulga (TUR); Torsten Bock (GER)
16 August 2004; 16:30	Report	Konukh 3 Yaina 2 Salimova 1 Smurova 1 Turova 1	Goals	Gardiner 2 Arpin 1 Bégin 1 Dow 1 Robinson 1	Athens Olympic Aquatic Centre; Referees: Erhan Tulga (TUR); Torsten Bock (GER)

18 August 2004; 10:45	Report	United States	5–6	Canada	Athens Olympic Aquatic Centre; Referees: Nikolaos Stavropoulos (GRE); Noel Harrod (AUS)
18 August 2004; 10:45	Report	Score by quarters: 0–0, 1–0, 3–1, 1–5			Athens Olympic Aquatic Centre; Referees: Nikolaos Stavropoulos (GRE); Noel Harrod (AUS)
18 August 2004; 10:45	Report	Beauregard 1 Dingeldein 1 Lorenz 1 Moody 1 Rulon 1	Goals	Bégin 3 Dow 2 Campbell 1	Athens Olympic Aquatic Centre; Referees: Nikolaos Stavropoulos (GRE); Noel Harrod (AUS)

20 August 2004; 16:45	Report	Hungary	5–4	Canada	Athens Olympic Aquatic Centre; Referees: R adu Matache (ROU); Roberto Pentronilli (ITA)
20 August 2004; 16:45	Report	Score by quarters: 1–2, 2–0, 2–1, 0–1			Athens Olympic Aquatic Centre; Referees: R adu Matache (ROU); Roberto Pentronilli (ITA)
20 August 2004; 16:45	Report	Stieber 2 Kisteleki 1 Primász 1 Valkay 1	Goals	Bégin 1 Dionne 1 Gardiner 1 Salat 1	Athens Olympic Aquatic Centre; Referees: R adu Matache (ROU); Roberto Pentronilli (ITA)

Classification 7th–8th

22 August 2004; 10:45	Report	Kazakhstan	4–10	Canada	Athens Olympic Aquatic Centre; Referees: Radosław Koryzna (POL); Elizabeth Burman (NZL)
22 August 2004; 10:45	Report	Score by quarters: 0–2, 1–4, 3–3, 0–1			Athens Olympic Aquatic Centre; Referees: Radosław Koryzna (POL); Elizabeth Burman (NZL)
22 August 2004; 10:45	Report	Koroleva 4	Goals	Arpin 2 Bégin 2 Campbell 2 Gardiner 2 Dow 1 Illing 1	Athens Olympic Aquatic Centre; Referees: Radosław Koryzna (POL); Elizabeth Burman (NZL)

== Weightlifting ==
Two Canadian weightlifters qualified for the following events:

Athlete	Event	Snatch		Clean & Jerk		Total	Rank
Athlete	Event	Result	Rank	Result	Rank	Total	Rank
Akos Sandor	Men's −105 kg	~~162.5~~	DNF	—	—	—	DNF
Maryse Turcotte	Women's −58 kg	90	=11	120	=9	210	11

== Wrestling ==
Key:

- VT - Victory by Fall.
- PP - Decision by Points - the loser with technical points.
- PO - Decision by Points - the loser without technical points.

Men's freestyle

Athlete	Event	Elimination Pool			Quarterfinal	Semifinal	Final / BM	
Athlete	Event	Opposition Result	Opposition Result	Rank	Opposition Result	Opposition Result	Opposition Result	Rank
Guivi Sissaouri	−60 kg	Umakhanov (RUS); W 3–1 ^{PP}	Odabasi (TUR); W 3–1 ^{PP}	1 Q	Fedoryshyn (UKR); L 0–3 ^{PO}	Did not advance	Pogosian (GEO); L 0–5 ^{VB}	6
Evan MacDonald	−66 kg	Spiridonov (KAZ); L 1–3 ^{PP}	Barzakov (BUL); L 0–4 ^{ST}	3	Did not advance			17
Daniel Igali	−74 kg	Aslanov (AZE); W 3–1 ^{PP}	Abdusalomov (TJK); W 3–1 ^{PP}	1 Q	Fundora (CUB); L 1–3 ^{PP}	Did not advance		6

Women's freestyle

Athlete	Event	Elimination Pool			Classification	Semifinal	Final / BM	
Athlete	Event	Opposition Result	Opposition Result	Rank	Opposition Result	Opposition Result	Opposition Result	Rank
Lyndsay Belisle	−48 kg	C Icho (JPN); L 0–4 ^{ST}	Wagner (GER); L 1–3 ^{PP}	3	Did not advance			11
Tonya Verbeek	−55 kg	O'Donnell (USA); W 4–1 ^{SP}	Smirnova (RUS); W 4–1 ^{SP}	1 Q	Bye	Karlsson (SWE); W 3–1 ^{PP}	Yoshida (JPN); L 0–3 ^{PO}	2nd place, silver medalist(s)
Viola Yanik	−63 kg	McMann (USA); W 3–1 ^{PP}	Meng Ll (CHN); L 1–3 ^{PP}	2	Groß (GER); W 3–1 ^{PP}	Did not advance	Khilko (BLR); W 3–1 ^{PP}	5
Christine Nordhagen	−72 kg	Wang X (CHN); L 1–3 ^{PP}	Juszczak (ITA); W 3–1 ^{PP}	2	Montgomery (USA); W 3–1 ^{PP}	Did not advance	Schätzle (GER); W 5–0 ^{VB}	5

== Media coverage ==
The main network for Olympic coverage in Canada is the CBC which covers events live, and then replays highlights in prime time. Both the French and English CBC and Radio-Canada are covering different events. The cable channels TSN & RDS won the rights to broadcast some parts of the games, mostly team sports that CBC and Radio-Canada decided not to cover. The digital channel CBC Country Canada, only available to a minority of Canadians, covered equestrian events.

== National outfits ==
Roots Canada was the official outfitter of clothing for members of the Canadian Olympic team. The same clothing was also sold at Roots stores in Canada. This was the last year for Roots, thereafter HBC was given the contract for official Olympic clothing.

== See also ==
- Canada at the 2002 Commonwealth Games
- Canada at the 2003 Pan American Games
- Canada at the 2004 Summer Paralympics
