= 2003 Eastern League season =

The 2003 Eastern League season began on approximately April 1 and the regular season ended on approximately September 1.

The Akron Aeros defeated the New Haven Ravens 3 games to 0 to win the Eastern League Championship Series.

== Regular season ==
=== Standings ===
Eastern League - Northern Division
Team	Win	Loss	%	GB
**New Haven Ravens**	79	63	.556	–
New Britain Rock Cats	73	68	.518	5.5
Portland Sea Dogs	72	70	.507	7.0
Trenton Thunder	70	71	.496	8.5
Binghamton Mets	63	78	.447	15.5
Norwich Navigators	62	79	.440	16.5

Eastern League - Southern Division
Team	Win	Loss	%	GB
**Akron Aeros**	88	53	.624	–
Altoona Curve	78	63	.553	10.0
Erie SeaWolves	72	70	.507	16.5
Bowie Baysox	69	72	.489	19.0
Reading Phillies	62	79	.440	26.0
Harrisburg Senators	60	82	.423	28.5

Notes:

Green shade indicates that team advanced to the playoffs
Bold indicates that team advanced to ELCS
Italics indicates that team won ELCS

=== Statistical league leaders ===
==== Batting leaders ====
Stat	Player	Total
AVG	Alex Ríos (New Haven Ravens)	.352
HR	Jeff Inglin (Reading Phillies)	24
RBI	Jeff Inglin (Reading Phillies)	103
R	Brian Myrow (Trenton Thunder)	103

==== Pitching leaders ====
Stat	Player	Total
W	Sean Burnett (Altoona Curve)	14
ERA	David Gassner (New Haven Ravens)	2.79
SO	Francisco Cruceta (Akron Aeros)	134
SV	Brian Schmack (Erie SeaWolves)	29

== Playoffs ==
=== Divisional Series ===
==== Northern Division ====
The New Haven Ravens defeated the New Britain Rock Cats in the Northern Division playoffs 3 games to 2.

==== Southern Division ====
The Akron Aeros defeated the Altoona Curve in the Southern Division playoffs 3 games to 1.

=== Championship Series ===
The Akron Aeros defeated the New Haven Ravens in the ELCS 3 games to 0.
