= Pacific Coast League Manager of the Year Award =

- Sport: Baseball
- League: Pacific Coast League
- Awarded for: Best regular-season manager in the Pacific Coast League
- Country: United States; Canada
- Presented by: Pacific Coast League

History
- First award: Johnny Lipon (1967)
- Most wins: Fran Riordan (3); Dan Rohn (3)
- Most recent: Scott Hennessey (2026)

The Pacific Coast League Manager of the Year Award is an annual award given to the best manager in Minor League Baseball's Pacific Coast League based on their regular-season performance as voted on by league managers. Broadcasters, Minor League Baseball executives, members of the media, coaches, and other team representatives from the league's clubs have previously voted as well. Though the league was established in 1903, the award was not created until 1967. After the cancellation of the 2020 season, the league was known as the Triple-A West in 2021 before reverting to the Pacific Coast League name in 2022.

The only managers to win the award on three occasions are Fran Riordan, who won in 2019, 2023, and 2025, and Dan Rohn, who was selected in 2001, 2004, and 2005. Four others have each won twice: Rocky Bridges, Stubby Clapp, Jim Lefebvre, and Jimy Williams. Clapp (2017 and 2018), Lefebvre (1985 and 1986), and Rohn (2004 and 2005) won the award in consecutive years.

Seven managers from the Tacoma Rainiers have been selected for the Manager of the Year Award, more than any other team in the league, followed by the Las Vegas Aviators and Phoenix Firebirds (5); the Tucson Sidewinders (4); the Hawaii Islanders, Iowa Cubs, Oklahoma City Comets, Portland Beavers, and Salt Lake City Angels (3); the Albuquerque Dukes, Albuquerque Isotopes, Colorado Springs Sky Sox, Memphis Redbirds, Nashville Sounds, Salt Lake Bees, and Spokane Indians (2); and the Edmonton Trappers, Eugene Emeralds, Reno Aces, Round Rock Express, Sacramento River Cats, Sugar Land Space Cowboys, Tulsa Oilers, and Vancouver Canadians (1).

Eight managers from the Athletics and Los Angeles Dodgers Major League Baseball (MLB) organizations have won the award, more than any others, followed by the Los Angeles Angels organization (7); the San Francisco Giants organization (5); the Chicago Cubs, Houston Astros, and Seattle Mariners organizations (4); the Cleveland Guardians and St. Louis Cardinals organizations (3); the Arizona Diamondbacks, Minnesota Twins, Philadelphia Phillies, and Texas Rangers organizations (2); and the Milwaukee Brewers, New York Mets, Pittsburgh Pirates, and San Diego Padres organizations (1).

== Winners ==
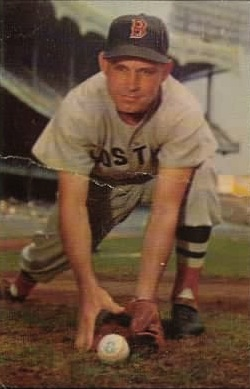
Johnny Lipon won the first Pacific Coast League Manager of the Year Award in 1967.

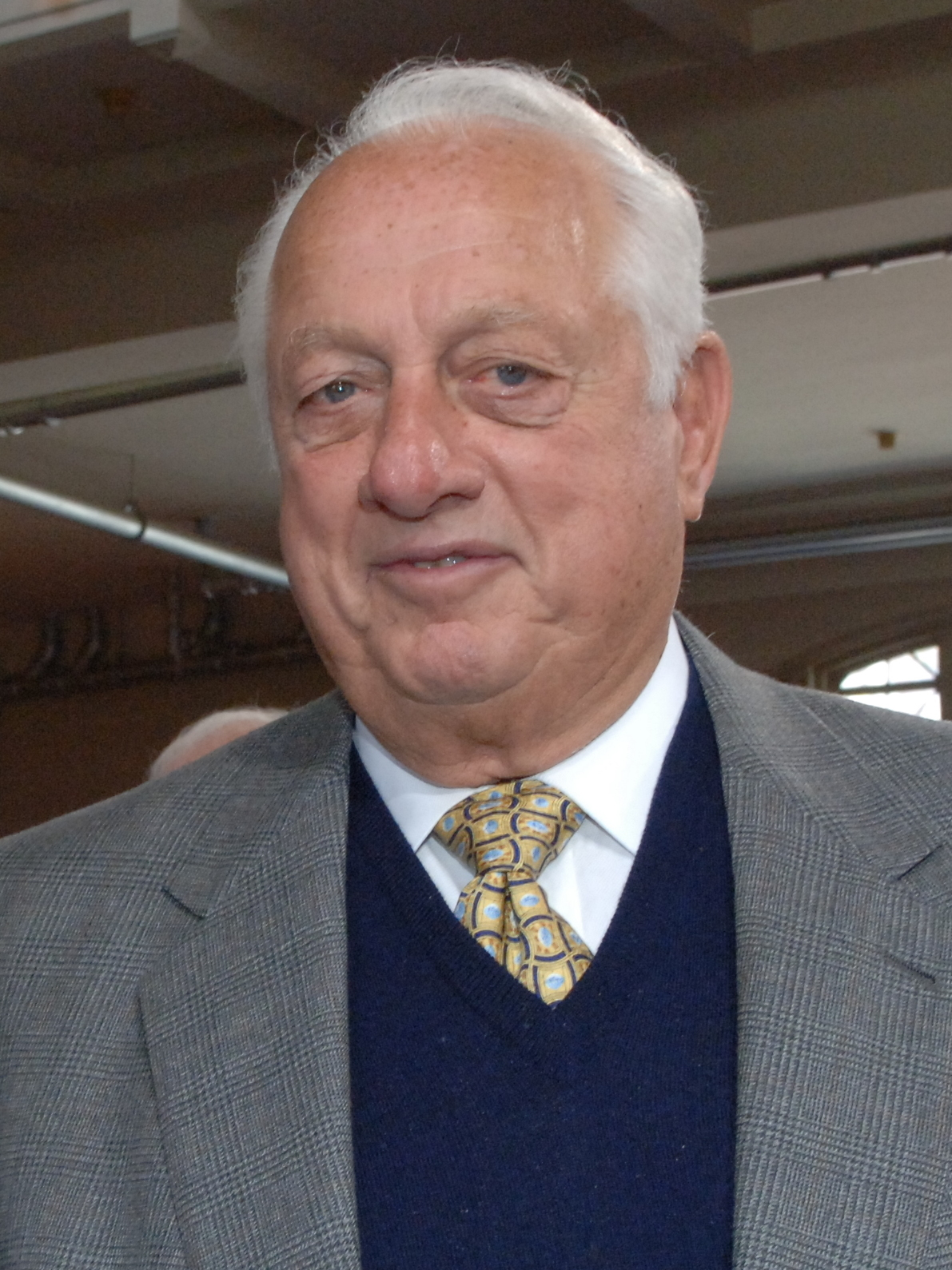
Tommy Lasorda, the 1970 winner, won two National League Manager of the Year Awards (1983 & 1988) and was inducted into the Baseball Hall of Fame in 1997.

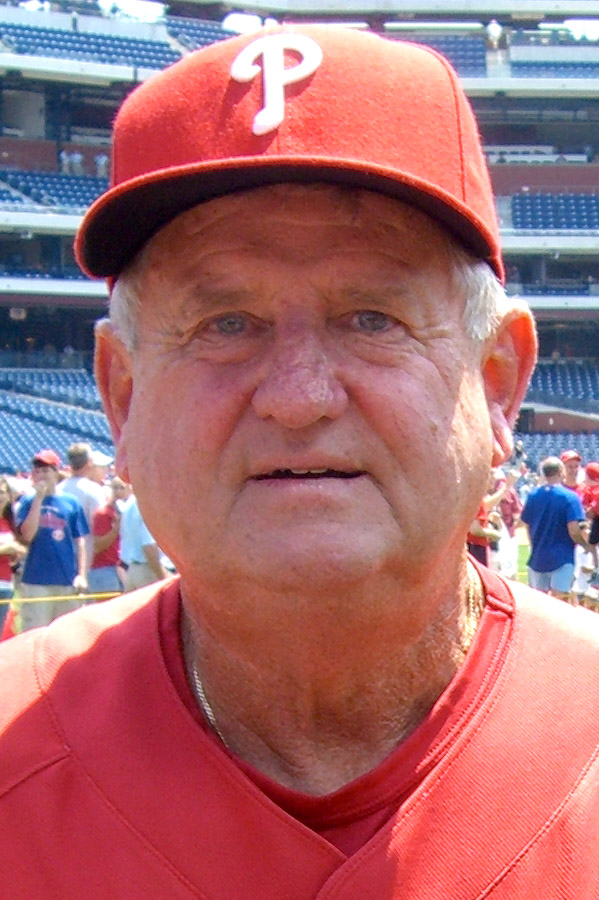
Jimy Williams, who won two awards (1976 & 1979), was the 1999 American League Manager of the Year.

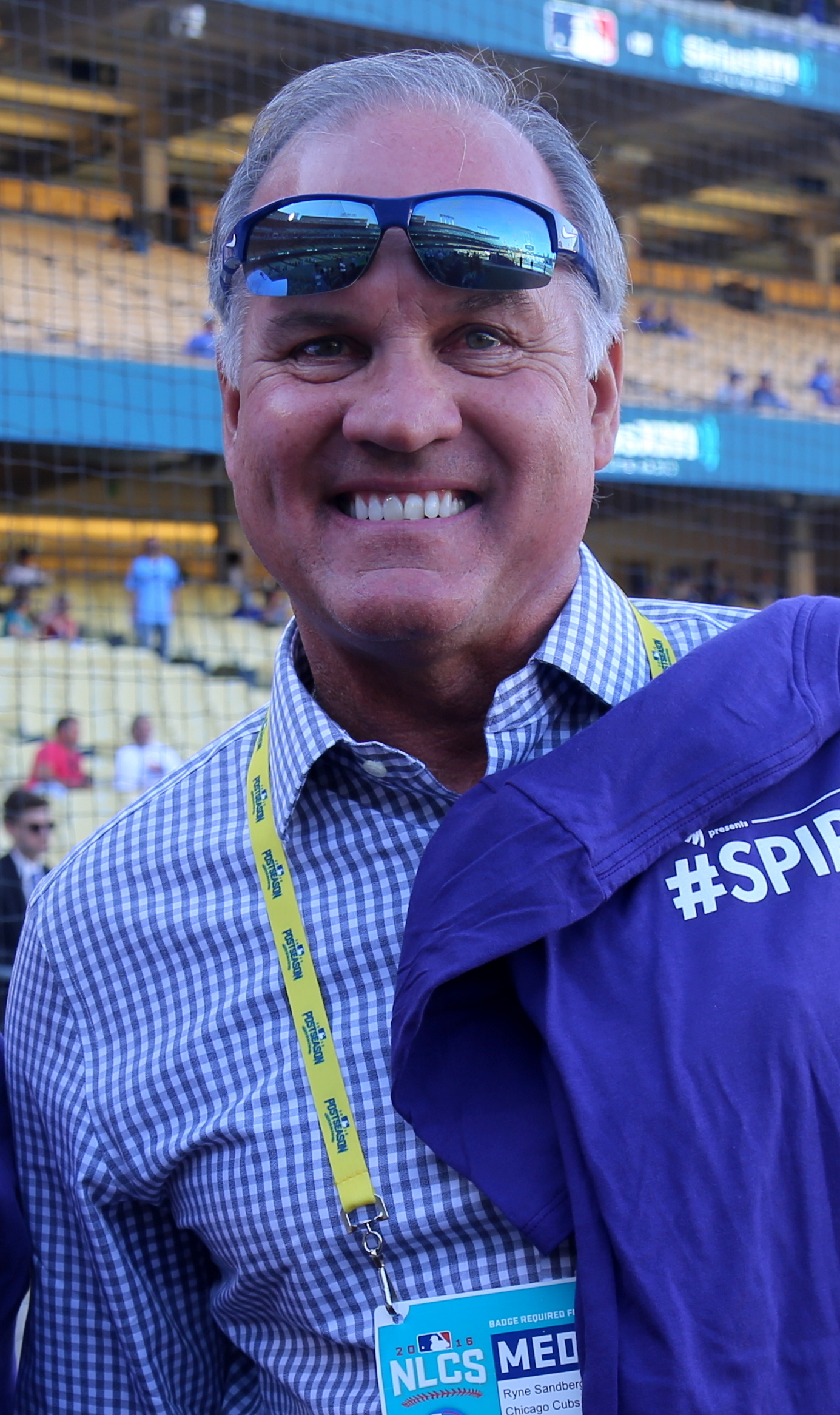
Ryne Sandberg, who was inducted into the Baseball Hall of Fame in 2005, was the 2010 Manager of the Year.

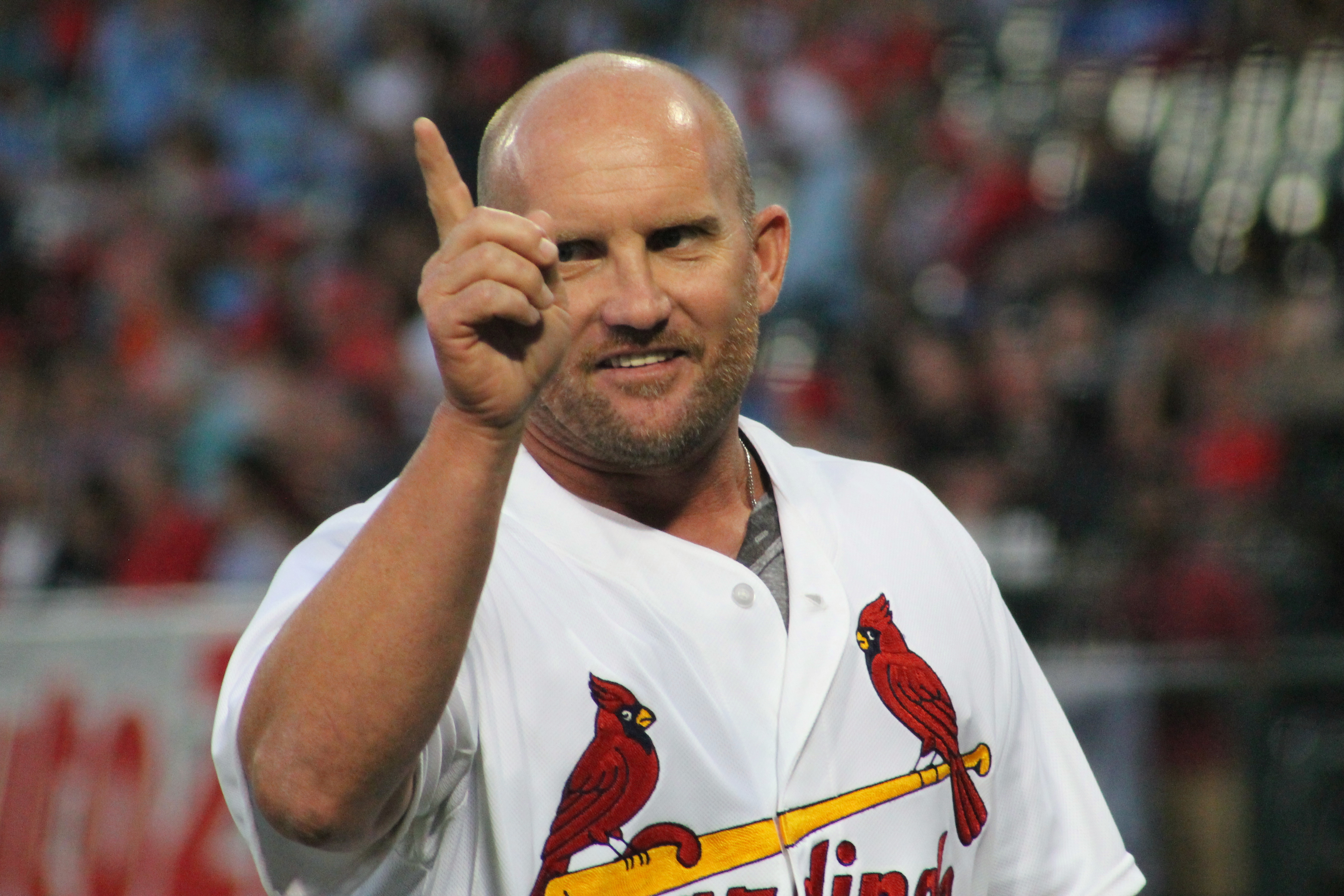
Stubby Clapp won the award in 2017 and 2018 and led the Memphis Redbirds to back-to-back championships in the same years.

Key
| League | The team's final position in the league standings |
| Division | The team's final position in the divisional standings |
| Record | The team's wins and losses during the regular season |
| (#) | Number of wins by managers who won the award multiple times |
| ^ | Indicates multiple award winners in the same year |
| * | Indicates league champions |

Winners
| Year | Winner | Team | Organization | League | Division | Record | Ref(s). |
|---|---|---|---|---|---|---|---|
| 1967 | Johnny Lipon | Portland Beavers | Cleveland Indians | 3rd | 2nd | 79–69 | |
| 1968 | Warren Spahn | Tulsa Oilers* | St. Louis Cardinals | 1st | 1st | 95–53 | |
| 1969 | Whitey Lockman | Tacoma Cubs* | Chicago Cubs | 2nd | 1st | 86–60 | |
| 1970^ | Tommy Lasorda | Spokane Indians* | Los Angeles Dodgers | 2nd | 1st | 94–52 | |
| 1970^ | Chuck Tanner | Hawaii Islanders | California Angels | 1st | 1st | 98–48 | |
| 1971 | Del Rice | Salt Lake City Angels* | California Angels | 2nd | 1st | 78–68 | |
| 1972 | Andy Seminick | Eugene Emeralds | Philadelphia Phillies | 4th | 1st | 79–69 | |
| 1973 | None selected | | | | | | |
| 1974 | Rocky Bridges (1) | Phoenix Giants | San Francisco Giants | 4th | 2nd | 75–69 | |
| 1975 | Roy Hartsfield | Hawaii Islanders* | San Diego Padres | 1st | 1st | 88–56 | |
| 1976 | Jimy Williams (1) | Salt Lake City Gulls | California Angels | 1st | 1st | 90–54 | |
| 1977 | Rocky Bridges (2) | Phoenix Giants* | San Francisco Giants | 1st | 1st | 81–59 | |
| 1978 | None selected | | | | | | |
| 1979 | Jimy Williams (2) | Salt Lake City Gulls* | California Angels | 2nd | 2nd | 80–68 | |
| 1980 | Jimmy Johnson | Tucson Toros | Houston Astros | 1st | 1st | 87–59 | |
| 1981 | Ed Nottle | Tacoma Tigers | Oakland Athletics | 2nd | 1st | 78–61 | |
| 1982 | Moose Stubing | Spokane Indians | California Angels | 3rd | 2nd | 78–65 | |
| 1983 | John Felske | Portland Beavers* | Philadelphia Phillies | 3rd (tie) | 1st (tie) | 75–67 | |
| 1984 | Tommy Sandt | Hawaii Islanders | Pittsburgh Pirates | 1st | 1st | 87–53 | |
| 1985 | Jim Lefebvre (1) | Phoenix Giants | San Francisco Giants | 2nd | 2nd | 80–62 | |
| 1986 | Jim Lefebvre (2) | Phoenix Firebirds | San Francisco Giants | 2nd | 1st | 81–61 | |
| 1987 | Keith Lieppman | Tacoma Tigers | Oakland Athletics | 2nd | 2nd | 78–65 | |
| 1988 | Terry Collins | Albuquerque Dukes | Los Angeles Dodgers | 1st | 1st | 86–56 | |
| 1989 | Mike Hargrove | Colorado Springs Sky Sox | Cleveland Indians | 2nd | 2nd | 78–64 | |
| 1990 | Kevin Kennedy | Albuquerque Dukes* | Los Angeles Dodgers | 1st | 1st | 91–51 | |
| 1991 | Bob Skinner | Tucson Toros* | Houston Astros | 2nd | 2nd | 79–61 | |
| 1992 | Charlie Manuel | Colorado Springs Sky Sox* | Cleveland Indians | 1st | 1st | 84–57 | |
| 1993 | Scott Ullger | Portland Beavers | Minnesota Twins | 1st | 1st | 87–56 | |
| 1994 | Rick Sweet | Tucson Toros | Houston Astros | 2nd | 2nd | 81–63 | |
| 1995 | Don Long | Vancouver Canadians | California Angels | 2nd | 1st | 81–60 | |
| 1996 | Gary Jones | Edmonton Trappers* | Oakland Athletics | 1st | 1st | 84–58 | |
| 1997 | Ron Wotus | Phoenix Firebirds | San Francisco Giants | 1st | 1st | 88–55 | |
| 1998 | Terry Kennedy | Iowa Cubs | Chicago Cubs | 1st | 1st | 85–59 | |
| 1999 | Greg Biagini | Oklahoma RedHawks | Texas Rangers | 2nd | 1st | 83–59 | |
| 2000 | Phil Roof | Salt Lake Buzz | Minnesota Twins | 1st | 1st | 90–53 | |
| 2001 | Dan Rohn (1) | Tacoma Rainiers* (Note: Tacoma and the New Orleans Zephyrs were declared co-champions after the playoffs were cancelled in the wake of the September 11 terrorist attacks.) | Seattle Mariners | 1st (tie) | 1st | 89–59 | |
| 2002 | Brad Mills | Las Vegas 51s | Los Angeles Dodgers | 1st | 1st | 89–59 | |
| 2003 | Tony DeFrancesco | Sacramento River Cats* | Oakland Athletics | 1st | 1st | 92–52 | |
| 2004 | Dan Rohn (2) | Tacoma Rainiers | Seattle Mariners | 3rd | 2nd | 79–63 | |
| 2005 | Dan Rohn (3) | Tacoma Rainiers | Seattle Mariners | 2nd (tie) | 1st | 80–64 | |
| 2006 | Chip Hale | Tucson Sidewinders* | Arizona Diamondbacks | 1st | 1st | 91–53 | |
| 2007 | Frank Kremblas | Nashville Sounds | Milwaukee Brewers | 1st | 1st | 89–55 | |
| 2008 | Pat Listach | Iowa Cubs | Chicago Cubs | 1st | 1st | 83–59 | |
| 2009 | Tim Wallach | Albuquerque Isotopes | Los Angeles Dodgers | 2nd | 1st | 80–64 | |
| 2010 | Ryne Sandberg | Iowa Cubs | Chicago Cubs | 1st (tie) | 1st (tie) | 82–62 | |
| 2011 | Bobby Jones | Round Rock Express | Texas Rangers | 2nd | 1st | 87–57 | |
| 2012 | Lorenzo Bundy | Albuquerque Isotopes | Los Angeles Dodgers | 4th | 1st | 80–64 | |
| 2013 | Keith Johnson | Salt Lake Bees | Los Angeles Angels of Anaheim | 4th | 1st | 78–66 | |
| 2014 | Wally Backman | Las Vegas 51s | New York Mets | 1st (tie) | 1st | 81–63 | |
| 2015 | Damon Berryhill | Oklahoma City Dodgers | Los Angeles Dodgers | 1st | 1st | 86–58 | |
| 2016 | Steve Scarsone | Nashville Sounds | Oakland Athletics | 1st | 1st | 83–59 | |
| 2017 | Stubby Clapp (1) | Memphis Redbirds* | St. Louis Cardinals | 1st | 1st | 91–50 | |
| 2018 | Stubby Clapp (2) | Memphis Redbirds* | St. Louis Cardinals | 1st | 1st | 83–57 | |
| 2019 | Fran Riordan (1) | Las Vegas Aviators | Oakland Athletics | 2nd | 1st | 83–57 | |
| 2020 | None selected (season cancelled due to COVID-19 pandemic) | | | | | | |
| 2021 | Kristopher Negrón | Tacoma Rainiers* | Seattle Mariners | 1st | 1st | 78–52 | |
| 2022 | Gil Velazquez | Reno Aces* | Arizona Diamondbacks | 1st | 1st | 85–63 | |
| 2023 | Fran Riordan (2) | Las Vegas Aviators | Oakland Athletics | 5th | 3rd | 75–74 | |
| 2024 | Mickey Storey | Sugar Land Space Cowboys* | Houston Astros | 1st | 1st | 93–56 | |
| 2025 | Fran Riordan (3) | Las Vegas Athletics* | Athletics | 3rd | 2nd | 83–67 | |
| 2026 | Scott Hennessey | Oklahoma City Comets* | Los Angeles Dodgers | 1st | 1st | 89–60 | |

== Wins by team ==
Active Pacific Coast League teams appear in bold.

| Team | Award(s) | Year(s) |
|---|---|---|
| **Tacoma Rainiers** (Tacoma Cubs/Tigers) | 7 | 1969, 1981, 1987, 2001, 2004, 2005, 2021 |
| **Las Vegas Aviators** (Las Vegas 51s) | 5 | 2002, 2014, 2019, 2023, 2025 |
| Phoenix Firebirds (Phoenix Giants) | 5 | 1974, 1977, 1985, 1986, 1997 |
| Tucson Sidewinders (Tucson Toros) | 4 | 1980, 1991, 1994, 2006 |
| Hawaii Islanders | 3 | 1970, 1975, 1984 |
| Iowa Cubs | 3 | 1998, 2008, 2010 |
| **Oklahoma City Comets** (Oklahoma RedHawks/Oklahoma City Dodgers) | 3 | 1999, 2015, 2026 |
| Portland Beavers | 3 | 1967, 1983, 1993 |
| Salt Lake City Angels (Salt Lake City Gulls) | 3 | 1971, 1976, 1979 |
| Albuquerque Dukes | 2 | 1988, 1990 |
| **Albuquerque Isotopes** | 2 | 2009, 2012 |
| Colorado Springs Sky Sox | 2 | 1989, 1992 |
| Memphis Redbirds | 2 | 2017, 2018 |
| Nashville Sounds | 2 | 2007, 2016 |
| **Salt Lake Bees** (Salt Lake Buzz) | 2 | 2000, 2013 |
| Spokane Indians | 2 | 1970, 1982 |
| Edmonton Trappers | 1 | 1996 |
| Eugene Emeralds | 1 | 1972 |
| **Reno Aces** | 1 | 2022 |
| **Round Rock Express** | 1 | 2011 |
| **Sacramento River Cats** | 1 | 2003 |
| **Sugar Land Space Cowboys** | 1 | 2024 |
| Tulsa Oilers | 1 | 1968 |
| Vancouver Canadians | 1 | 1995 |

== Wins by organization ==
Active Pacific Coast League–Major League Baseball affiliations appear in bold.

| Organization | Award(s) | Year(s) |
|---|---|---|
| **Athletics** (Oakland Athletics) | 8 | 1981, 1996, 1987, 2003, 2016, 2019, 2023, 2025 |
| **Los Angeles Dodgers** | 8 | 1970, 1988, 1990, 2002, 2009, 2012, 2015, 2026 |
| **Los Angeles Angels** (California Angels) | 7 | 1970, 1971, 1976, 1979, 1982, 1995, 2013 |
| **San Francisco Giants** | 5 | 1974, 1977, 1985, 1986, 1997 |
| Chicago Cubs | 4 | 1969, 1998, 2008, 2010 |
| **Houston Astros** | 4 | 1980, 1991, 1994, 2024 |
| **Seattle Mariners** | 4 | 2001, 2004, 2005, 2021 |
| Cleveland Guardians (Cleveland Indians) | 3 | 1967, 1989, 1992 |
| St. Louis Cardinals | 3 | 1968, 2017, 2018 |
| **Arizona Diamondbacks** | 2 | 2006, 2022 |
| Minnesota Twins | 2 | 1993, 2000 |
| Philadelphia Phillies | 2 | 1972, 1983 |
| **Texas Rangers** | 2 | 1999, 2011 |
| Milwaukee Brewers | 1 | 2007 |
| New York Mets | 1 | 2014 |
| Pittsburgh Pirates | 1 | 1984 |
| **San Diego Padres** | 1 | 1975 |
