= Moose Stubing =

American baseball player and coach (1938–2018)

- Pinch hitter
- Born: March 31, 1938; Bronx, New York, U.S.
- Died: January 19, 2018 (aged 79); Orange, California, U.S.
- Batted: Left Threw: Left

MLB debut
- August 14, 1967, for the California Angels

Last MLB appearance
- August 29, 1967, for the California Angels

MLB statistics
- Batting average: .000
- At bats: 5
- Runs scored: 0
- Stats at Baseball Reference

Teams
- California Angels (1967); As manager: California Angels (1988)

Lawrence George "Moose" Stubing (March 31, 1938 – January 19, 2018) was an American professional baseball scout, minor league manager and Major League Baseball third-base coach. Stubing attended high school in White Plains, New York, before signing his first professional contract in 1956. A first baseman and outfielder, he threw and batted left-handed, stood 6 ft 3 in (1.91 m) tall and weighed 220 lb (100 kg).

His playing career consisted of just five pinch-hit at-bats with the California Angels in the 1967 season. He was a longtime fixture as a minor league player from 1956 to 1969 in the Pittsburgh Pirates, New York/San Francisco Giants, St. Louis Cardinals and Angel organizations before his brief callup in 1967, hitting .283 with 192 home runs in 1,410 games.

He then became a manager in the minor leagues in the Angels' farm system, winning the 1982 Pacific Coast League Manager of the Year Award. In 1984, his Edmonton Trappers became the first Canadian team to win the PCL championship.

Stubing later became a coach with the Angels, and when Cookie Rojas was fired in 1988, he took over as manager and finished out the season, losing the final eight games.

After his coaching career, he scouted for the Angels through 2007. In 2008 he became a member of the professional scouting staff of the Washington Nationals.

Moose Stubing was also a referee in Division 1 college basketball, officiating games in the Pac-10 and other conferences.

Stubing died on January 19, 2018, at the age of 79.

Preceded by Jimy Williams	Salt Lake City Gulls manager 1980–1981	Succeeded by Bobby Floyd
Preceded by Ken Pape	Spokane Indians manager 1982	Succeeded by Franchise relocated
Preceded by Gordon Lund	Edmonton Trappers manager 1983–1984	Succeeded by Winston Llenas
Preceded by Preston Gómez	California Angels third base coach 1985–1990	Succeeded by Bobby Knoop
