= Baseball at the 1999 Pan American Games =

- Venues: Canwest Global Park (primary); Stonewall Quarry Park (secondary); Winnipeg, Manitoba, Canada
- Dates: July 25 – August 2, 1999
- Competitors: 9 teams

Medalists
| Gold medal | Cuba |
| Silver medal | United States |
| Bronze medal | Canada |

Baseball at the 1999 Pan American Games was held between July 25 and August 2 in Winnipeg, Manitoba, Canada. A total of nine teams competed: Brazil, Canada, Cuba, Dominican Republic, Guatemala, Mexico, Nicaragua, Panama, and the United States. The primary venue for this competition was CanWest Global Park, while Stonewall Quarry Park in Stonewall, Manitoba, was used as a secondary venue.

Cuba entered the competition as the seven-time defending champions, having won each gold medal dating back to 1971. They successfully defended their title, with the United States finishing second. The 1999 games were the first time professional baseball players were allowed to participate in the Pan American Games, and the top two teams qualified for the 2000 Summer Olympics.

== Medal summary ==
=== Medal table ===
* Host nation (Canada)

| Rank | Nation | Gold | Silver | Bronze | Total |
|---|---|---|---|---|---|
| 1 | Cuba | 1 | 0 | 0 | 1 |
| 2 | United States | 0 | 1 | 0 | 1 |
| 3 | Canada* | 0 | 0 | 1 | 1 |
| Totals (3 entries) | | 1 | 1 | 1 | 3 |

=== Medalists ===
| Event | Gold | Silver | Bronze |
|---|---|---|---|
| Men's | Cuba: Danys Báez; Danel Castro; José Contreras; Faustino Corrales; Yobal Dueñas; Michel Enríquez; José Ibar; Orestes Kindelán; Daniel Lazo; Pedro Luis Lazo; Ciro Silvino Licea; Omar Linares; Juan Manrique; Isaac Martínez; Javier Méndez; Germán Mesa; Juan Padilla; Ariel Pestano; Gabriel Pierre; Maels Rodríguez; Ormari Romero; Norge Luis Vera; Robelquis Videaux; Luis Ulacia | United States: Ryan Anderson; Peter Bergeron; Milton Bradley; Travis Dawkins; Shawn Gilbert; Charlie Greene; Jason Hardtke; David Holdridge; Marcus Jensen; Adam Kennedy; Matthew LeCroy; Mark Mulder; Mike Neill; Craig Paquette; John Patterson; Brad Penny; Dave Roberts; J. C. Romero; Bobby Seay; Scott Stewart; Derek Wallace; Dan Wheeler; Todd Williams; Jon Zuber | Canada: Todd Betts; Rob Butler; Stubby Clapp; Lee Delfino; Colin Dixon; Troy Fortin; Aaron Guiel; Jason Gooding; Jason Green; Steve Green; Yan Lachapell; Clint Lawrence; Julien Lepine; Matt Logan; Mike Meyers; Aaron Myette; Ryan Radmanovich; Mark Randall; Chad Ricketts; Dave Ross; Andy Stewart; Matt Stockman; Julien Tucker; Jeremy Ware |

== Preliminary round ==
=== Pool A ===
| Pos | Team | Pld | W | L | RF | RA | RD | PCT | Qualification |
|---|---|---|---|---|---|---|---|---|---|
| 1 | Canada (H) | 4 | 4 | 0 | 34 | 12 | +22 | 1.000 | Advance to Knockout stage |
| 2 | United States | 4 | 3 | 1 | 24 | 15 | +9 | .750 | Advance to Knockout stage |
| 3 | Cuba | 4 | 2 | 2 | 21 | 20 | +1 | .500 | Advance to Knockout stage |
| 4 | Mexico | 4 | 1 | 3 | 13 | 13 | 0 | .250 | Advance to Knockout stage |
| 5 | Brazil | 4 | 0 | 4 | 7 | 39 | −32 | .000 | |

Source: XIII Pan American Games
(H) Hosts

| July 25; 14:00 | Brazil | 4–16 | Canada | CanWest Global Park, Winnipeg |

| July 25; 19:30 | Cuba | 5–1 | Mexico | CanWest Global Park, Winnipeg |

| July 26; 14:00 | United States | 6–7 | Canada | CanWest Global Park, Winnipeg |

| July 26; 18:00 | Mexico | 10–0 | Brazil | Stonewall Quarry Park, Stonewall |

| July 27; 9:00 | Mexico | 1–5 | United States | CanWest Global Park, Winnipeg |

| July 27; 19:30 | Cuba | 10–1 | Brazil | CanWest Global Park, Winnipeg |

| July 28; 14:00 | United States | 10–5 | Cuba | CanWest Global Park, Winnipeg |

| July 28; 19:30 | Canada | 3–1 | Mexico | CanWest Global Park, Winnipeg |

| July 29; 14:00 | Canada | 8–1 | Cuba | CanWest Global Park, Winnipeg |

| July 29; 18:00 | Brazil | 2–3 | United States | Stonewall Quarry Park, Stonewall |

=== Pool B ===
| Pos | Team | Pld | W | L | RF | RA | RD | PCT | Qualification |
|---|---|---|---|---|---|---|---|---|---|
| 1 | Nicaragua | 3 | 2 | 1 | 11 | 11 | 0 | .667 | Advance to Knockout stage |
| 2 | Dominican Republic | 3 | 2 | 1 | 20 | 9 | +11 | .667 | Advance to Knockout stage |
| 3 | Panama | 3 | 2 | 1 | 18 | 12 | +6 | .667 | Advance to Knockout stage |
| 4 | Guatemala | 3 | 0 | 3 | 7 | 24 | −17 | .000 | Advance to Knockout stage |

Source: XIII Pan American Games

| July 25; 9:00 | Guatemala | 1–10 | Dominican Republic | CanWest Global Park, Winnipeg |

| July 26; 19:30 | Nicaragua | 1–6 | Panama | CanWest Global Park, Winnipeg |

| July 27; 18:00 | Dominican Republic | 8–5 | Panama | Stonewall Quarry Park, Stonewall |

| July 28; 18:00 | Guatemala | 3–7 | Nicaragua | Stonewall Quarry Park, Stonewall |

| July 29; 9:00 | Panama | 7–3 | Guatemala | CanWest Global Park, Winnipeg |

| July 29; 19:30 | Dominican Republic | 2–3 | Nicaragua | CanWest Global Park, Winnipeg |

== Knockout stage ==
Quarterfinals
July 31 – Winnipeg
Panama | 2
United States | 5
July 31 – Stonewall
Mexico | 5
Nicaragua | 1
July 31 – Winnipeg
Guatemala | 2
Canada | 12
July 31 – Winnipeg
Cuba | 3
Dominican Republic | 1

Semifinals
August 1 – Winnipeg
United States | 2
Mexico | 1
August 1 – Winnipeg
Canada | 2
Cuba | 3

Gold Medal Match
August 2 – Winnipeg
United States | 1
Cuba | 5
Bronze Medal Match
August 2 – Winnipeg
Canada | 9
Mexico | 2

== See also ==
- Softball at the 1999 Pan American Games
