= Stonewall Quarry Park =

Park in Stonewall, Manitoba, Canada

Coordinates: 50°08′31″N 97°19′35″W

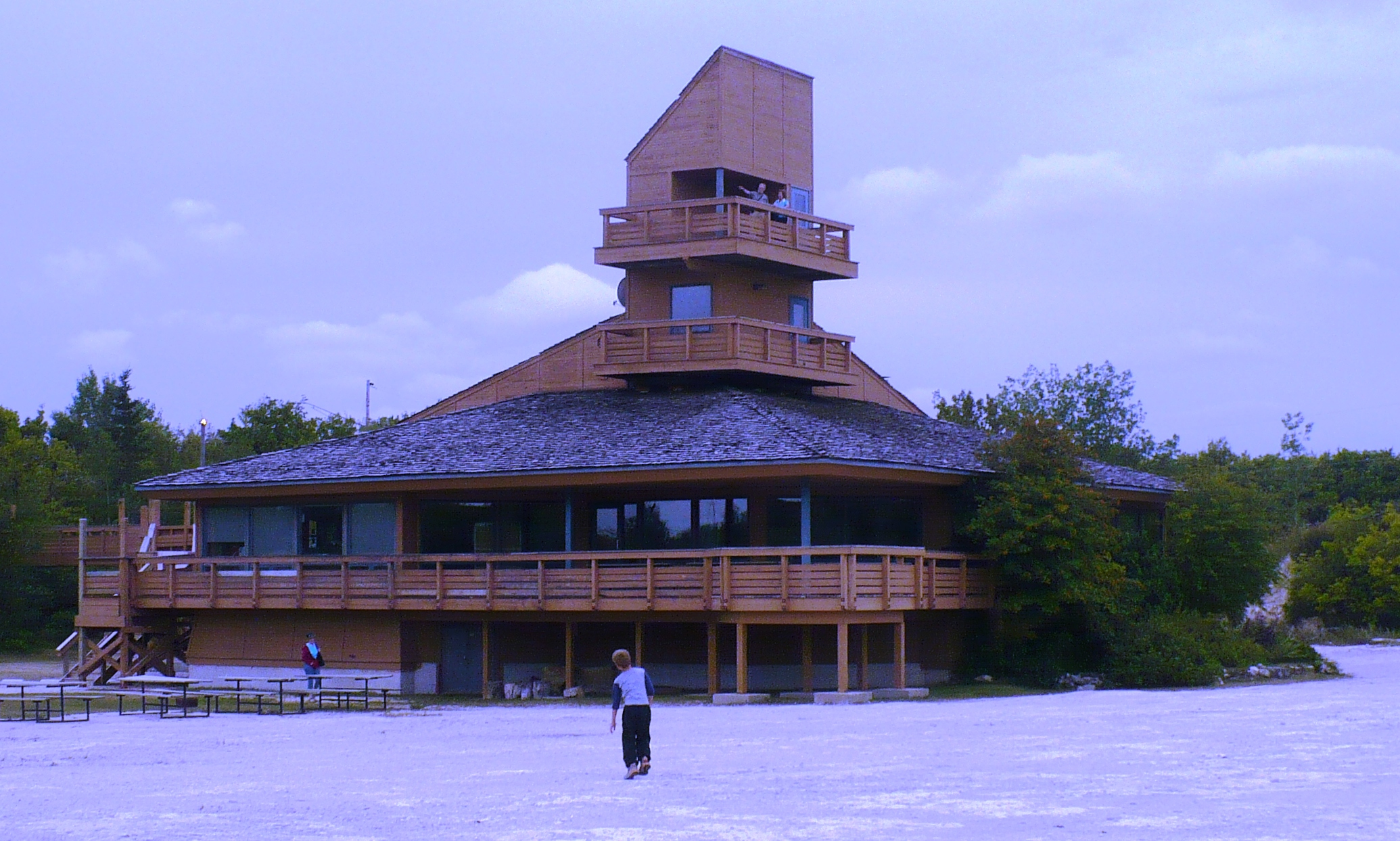
Old Quarry Park Interpretive Centre (as seen 3 months before it burned down). A new one was opened on the fourth anniversary of the fire.

Stonewall Quarry Park is an outdoor recreational facility located in the town of Stonewall, Manitoba, Canada. The 80-acre (32 ha) park is built over the remains of a limestone quarry that closed in the 1960s. The park features walking trails, an interpretive centre, two man-made lakes, and campground. The park is also home to Fines Field, one of the finest baseball complexes in the province.

The park was opened in 1984 (42 years ago) by the Town of Stonewall to commemorate the importance of the quarry to the town's history. The area around the old kilns used by the quarry was developed and restored to a natural state. The town constructed an interpretive centre and museum, which opened in 1985, and was destroyed by fire in November 2007. It has since been replaced by a new Heritage Arts Centre, which includes an interpretive centre, auditorium, and administration offices.

As of 2022, one of the three limestone kilns were demolished due to dangers of collapsing. The Stonewall Town Council has approved a $1,000,000 contribution for the kilns restoration.

Quarry Park is also well known for the Fines Field baseball complex located on the park grounds, with a total of nine Class A diamonds located on site. The main diamond features grandstand seating for 950 spectators, a sound booth and a concessions stand. The park has hosted a number of significant tournaments, such as the 1997 and 1998 Blue Jays Cups (now the Baseball Canada Cup) and the 2003 Western Canada Summer Games. In 1999, Quarry Park co-hosted the Pan American baseball tournament together with Winnipeg's CanWest Global Park.
