= Jeremy Ware =

Canadian retired baseball left fielder

- Outfielder
- Born: October 25, 1975 (age 50); Orangeville, Ontario, Canada
- Bats: Right Throws: Right
Medals
Men's baseball
Representing Canada
Pan American Games
Bronze medal – third place	1999 Winnipeg	Team competition

Jeremy Jon Ware (born October 23, 1975) is a Canadian former professional baseball left fielder.

== Career ==
He was drafted by the Montreal Expos in 1994 Major League Baseball draft in the 25th round, 700th overall.

Ware formerly played for the Edmonton Trappers until the team was sold to a group of investors including baseball legend Nolan Ryan, which later moved the team to Round Rock, Texas, where they are now known as the Round Rock Express.

He played with the 2008 Ottawa Rapids and 2009 Ottawa Rapidz of the CanAm League and was a member of the fourth-place Team Canada at the 2004 Summer Olympics.

He later played with the Kitchener Panthers of the Ontario Intercounty Baseball League.
