= Aaron Myette =

Canadian baseball player (born 1977)

- Pitcher
- Born: September 26, 1977 (age 48); New Westminster, British Columbia, Canada
- Batted: Right Threw: Right

Professional debut
- MLB: September 7, 1999, for the Chicago White Sox
- NPB: March 27, 2005, for the Tohoku Rakuten Golden Eagles

Last appearance
- MLB: September 27, 2004, for the Cincinnati Reds
- NPB: April 3, 2005, for the Tohoku Rakuten Golden Eagles

MLB statistics
- Win–loss record: 6–12
- Earned run average: 8.16
- Strikeouts: 134

NPB statistics
- Win–loss record: 0–0
- Earned run average: 20.77
- Strikeouts: 3
- Stats at Baseball Reference

Teams
- Chicago White Sox (1999–2000); Texas Rangers (2001–2002); Cleveland Indians (2003); Cincinnati Reds (2004); Tohoku Rakuten Golden Eagles (2005)
Medals
Men's baseball
Representing Canada
Pan American Games
| Bronze medal – third place | 1999 Winnipeg | Team |

Aaron Kenneth Myette (born September 26, 1977) is a Canadian former professional baseball right-handed pitcher, who played in Major League Baseball (MLB) and Nippon Professional Baseball (NPB).

== Career ==
Myette attended the University of Washington, where he played college baseball for the Washington Huskies in 1996.

Myette was selected by the Seattle Mariners in the 17th round of the 1995 Major League Baseball draft (454th overall), and then by the Chicago White Sox in the first round of the 1997 Major League Baseball draft (43rd overall). He played for the White Sox in 1999 and 2000. The White Sox traded Myette and Brian Schmack to the Texas Rangers for Royce Clayton after the 2000 season. He played for the Rangers (2001–2002), Cleveland Indians (2003) and Cincinnati Reds (2004). He was a member of Team Canada at the 2004 Summer Olympics, where they finished in fourth place. In 2005, he played for Tohoku Rakuten Golden Eagles in Japan. Myette played for the York Revolution of the independent Atlantic League for the 2008 season.

Aaron's brother Andrew was drafted in three consecutive years by the Rangers: the 17th round of the 2000 draft (514th overall), the 44th round of the 2001 draft (1305th overall) and the 41st round of the 2002 draft (1222nd overall).

Myette's first major league strikeout victim was Mo Vaughn.
