= Dan Rohn =

American baseball player (born 1956)

- Infielder
- Born: January 10, 1956 (age 70); Alpena, Michigan, U.S.
- Batted: Left Threw: Right

MLB debut
- September 2, 1983, for the Chicago Cubs

Last MLB appearance
- May 21, 1986, for the Cleveland Indians

MLB statistics
- Batting average: .250
- Home runs: 1
- Runs batted in: 11
- Stats at Baseball Reference

Teams
- Chicago Cubs (1983–1984); Cleveland Indians (1986)

Daniel Jay Rohn (born January 10, 1956) is an American former infielder in Major League Baseball. Rohn was drafted as a second baseman by the Chicago Cubs in the 4th round of the 1977 amateur draft, and made his major league debut on September 2, 1983. He was traded by the Cubs to the Cleveland Indians for Jay Baller on April 1, 1985.

Before joining the Seattle Mariners as a coach in 2006, Rohn was the manager of the Pacific Coast League's Tacoma Rainiers from 2001–2005. As the skipper for the Rainiers, he was named the PCL Manager of the Year in 2001 and again in 2004 & 2005. In 2001, he led the Rainiers to a Pacific Coast League co-championship shared with the New Orleans Zephyrs. In 2005 the team again reached the championship series, but lost 3–0 to the Nashville Sounds. Rohn also managed in the minor leagues for the Minnesota Twins organization from 1991–1992 and again from 1995–1996 with the Fort Wayne Wizards.

In 2007, he was hired to manage the Fresno Grizzlies, AAA affiliate of the San Francisco Giants. He also managed the Indios de Mayagüez, a team of the Puerto Rico baseball winter league. He resides in Traverse City, Michigan with wife Mindy. In 2010, he was named the manager of the Toronto Blue Jays Triple-A baseball team, the Las Vegas 51s of the Pacific Coast League.

In December 2010, Rohn was replaced as manager of the Las Vegas 51s by Marty Brown.

On Feb. 24, 2014, Rohn was hired as manager of the Traverse City Beach Bums of the independent Frontier League.

In 2020, Rohn was hired as the manager for the Lake Erie Crushers of the independent Frontier League. But the 2020 season was canceled due to COVID-19. Rohn would stay the manager of the Crushers for the 2021 season. The Crushers would have a 41-55 record and finished 3rd in the East division, thus missing the postseason. Rohn was replaced by Cam Roth as manager for the 2022 season.
