= Todd Betts =

Canadian baseball player

- Infielder
- Born: June 24, 1973 (age 52); East York, Ontario, Canada
- Batted: Left Threw: Right

Professional debut
- NPB: March 28, 2003, for the Yakult Swallows
- CPBL: March 21, 2006, for the La New Bears

Last appearance
- NPB: June 30, 2003, for the Yakult Swallows
- CPBL: June 30, 2006, for the La New Bears

NPB statistics
- Batting average: .287
- Home runs: 15
- Runs batted in: 52

CPBL statistics
- Batting average: .343
- Home runs: 3
- Runs batted in: 37

Teams
- Yakult Swallows (2003); La New Bears (2006)
Medals
Men's baseball
Representing Canada
Pan American Games
Bronze medal – third place	1999 Winnipeg	Team
World Junior Baseball Championship
Gold medal – first place	1991 Brandon	Team

Todd Mervyn Betts (born June 24, 1973) is a Canadian former professional baseball first baseman and a third baseman.

== Career ==
The Cleveland Indians chose Betts in the fourteen round in the 1993 Major League Baseball draft.

He later played with the Brantford Red Sox in the Ontario, Canada, Intercounty Baseball League.

In 2003, he played for Yakult Swallows in the Nippon Professional Baseball (NPB). After the 2003 season, he became a free agent.

In 2004, he played for New York Yankees organization. During the 2004 season, he was selected for Canada national baseball team at the 2004 Summer Olympics. Canada finished in fourth place.

He later signed with the La New Bears of the Chinese Professional Baseball League (CPBL) in early 2006 and played with that team until July 2006. As of May 2006, Betts held the highest batting average and RBI in the league. However his performance slumped after he suffered vertebra injuries in June after which La New Bears ended his contract in July 2006.

On July 25, 2007, he signed a contract with the Edmonton Cracker-Cats, hitting .275 with 1 home run in 33 games.

He next began his coaching career in 2008 between Team Canada and the Ontario Prospects helping develop professional hitters yearly before moving to the Ontario Blue Jays and Toronto Mets.

When he ended his active professional baseball career, he founded his own company, 4 Corners Elite Development, which helps children improve their overall skills. ((https://fourcornerselite.com/))
