= Kaila Holtz =

Canadian softball player

Kaila Holtz (born September 26, 1981) is a Canadian softball pitcher. Holtz has represented Canada at the Olympic Games.

Born in Edmonton, Alberta, Holtz began playing softball at age ten, and has attended the University of Massachusetts Amherst. She was a part of the Canadian Softball team who finished 5th at the 2004 Summer Olympics.
