= Stubby Clapp =

Canadian baseball player and coach (born 1973)

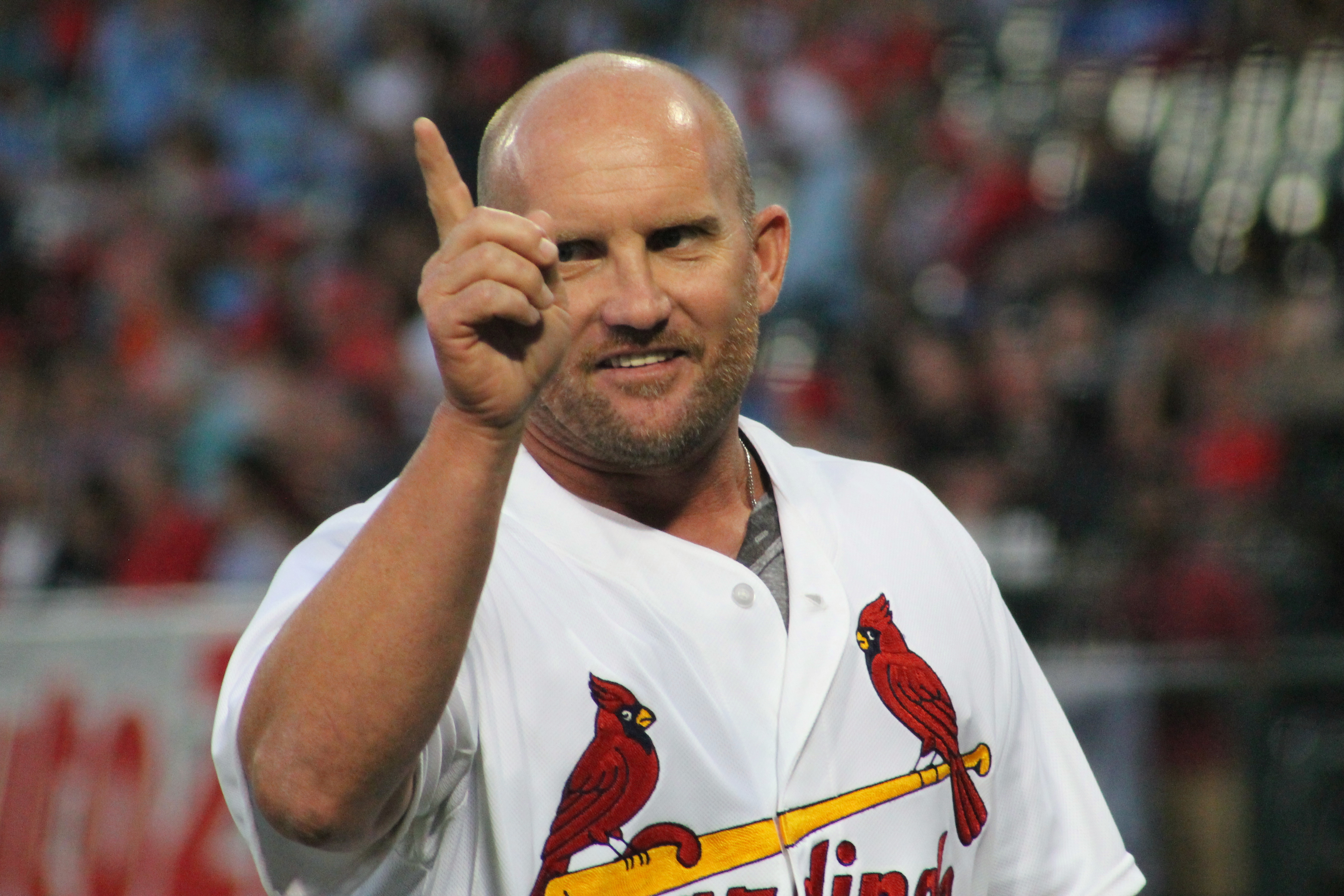
- Clapp being honored at AutoZone Park in 2016

St. Louis Cardinals – No. 82
- Second baseman / Coach
- Born: February 24, 1973 (age 53); Windsor, Ontario, Canada
- Batted: Left Threw: Right

MLB debut
- June 18, 2001, for the St. Louis Cardinals

Last MLB appearance
- October 4, 2001, for the St. Louis Cardinals

MLB statistics
- Batting average: .200
- Home runs: 0
- Runs batted in: 1
- Stats at Baseball Reference

Teams
- As player: St. Louis Cardinals (2001); As coach: St. Louis Cardinals (2019–present)
Medals
Men's baseball
Representing Canada
Pan American Games
Bronze medal – third place	1999 Winnipeg	Team
World Junior Baseball Championship
Gold medal – first place	1991 Brandon	Team

Richard Keith "Stubby" Clapp (born February 24, 1973) is a Canadian professional baseball coach and former second baseman and Triple-A manager who is the first base coach for the St. Louis Cardinals of Major League Baseball (MLB). He played for 11 years, most notably within the Cardinals organization, including a brief stint in MLB with the Cardinals. In his native Canada, he is best remembered for his performance at the 1999 Pan American Games in Winnipeg, where he hit a bases-loaded single in the 11th inning to beat a more experienced U.S. team and put Canada in the semifinals. Canada eventually won the bronze medal.

== Early life ==
In his youth, Stubby Clapp could be considered a two-sport athlete, having distinguished himself through the Windsor minor hockey system. After playing Bantam hockey in Windsor, Clapp played an important role for the Windsor Bulldogs (now the LaSalle Vipers), a junior hockey team, from 1990 to 1992. In 1991, the Bulldogs clinched first place during the regular season and Clapp scored five goals during the playoffs. For the 1991–1992 season, he was named captain of the team.

== Baseball career ==
Clapp graduated from Texas Tech University, where he played for the Red Raiders baseball team. He still holds (or shares) the Red Raiders' records for triples in a season (eight), runs in game (five, three times), strikeouts in a game (four) and walks in a season (66), both set during the 1996 season.

He was drafted by the St. Louis Cardinals in the 36th round (1,058th overall) of 1996 amateur entry draft. In 1998, when playing for the Double-A Arkansas Travelers, he led the league with 86 walks and 139 games played. He remains popular among Travelers fans to this day. He also played for the Edmonton Cracker Cats. Clapp was also popular in Syracuse, New York, and other cities where he played.

In 1999, Clapp was part of the Canadian team at the Pan American Games in Winnipeg. A popular player with his teammates, Clapp became a minor celebrity in Canada after his game-winning, bases-loaded single against the U.S. team.

From 1999–2002, he played for the Triple-A Memphis Redbirds. In 2000, he led the team with 138 hits, 89 runs, 80 walks, eight triples, and six sacrifice hits. He is second all-time for the Redbirds for games played (425) and hits (418). He was noted for doing a backflip every time he went onto the field.

In 2001, Clapp played 23 games for the St. Louis Cardinals, during which he had five hits in 25 at-bats, including two doubles and one RBI.

Clapp became a popular figure in Memphis, Tennessee, during his four-year stint with the Redbirds. He was often referred to as the "Mayor of Memphis". During the 2002 season, the 5 ft 8 in (1.73 m) Clapp was featured on a growth chart for kids sponsored by a Memphis-area medical group.

In 911 minor-league games, Clapp had a .270 batting average, 48 home runs, 50 triples, 196 doubles, 365 RBI, and 83 steals. Clapp also pitched in three games, pitching a total of 2 1/3 innings, giving up two hits and no earned runs.

He was part of Team Canada in the 2004 Summer Olympics who finished in fourth place. In 2006, Clapp played for Canada in the inaugural World Baseball Classic as one of two second basemen on the roster. In three games, Clapp hit .154, with a triple and an RBI.

In 2009, he was named one of the Memphis "Athletes of the Decade". In 2010, the club had "Ode to Clapping Night", which included giving away Clapp bobbleheads.

== Post-playing career ==
On April 21, 2007, Clapp's jersey #10 became the first number retired by the Memphis Redbirds, who painted "10" on the wall above their bullpen at AutoZone Park.

Clapp began his coaching career as a hitting coach for the Lexington Legends, the Houston Astros "A" ball team in the South Atlantic League. He came out of retirement to represent Canada at the 2008 Beijing Olympics, and was named to the roster for the 2009 World Baseball Classic.

In November 2010, Clapp became the hitting coach for the Corpus Christi Hooks, Houston's Double-A affiliate.

Clapp managed the Tri-City ValleyCats, a Single-A affiliate of the Houston Astros, during the 2011 and 2012 seasons.

In January 2013, Clapp was hired as the hitting coach for the Dunedin Blue Jays, Toronto's Advanced-A affiliate. On December 19, 2014, the New Hampshire Fisher Cats announced that he would be their new hitting coach.

Clapp was third base coach for the gold medal-winning Canada national baseball team at the 2015 Pan American Games in July 2015.

On November 30, 2016, the Cardinals named Clapp manager of the Memphis Redbirds. During the 2017 season, Memphis celebrated Clapp's backflipping antics by hosting a bobblehead night featuring Clapp performing his signature move in bobblehead form. On the field, Clapp led the Redbirds to win the 2017 American Conference Southern Division title and was selected as the 2017 PCL Manager of the Year. The Redbirds became the 2017 PCL champions after defeating the El Paso Chihuahuas in five games in the league championship final. Baseball America named Clapp their Minor League Manager of the Year for 2017, becoming the first Cardinals minor league manager to win the award.

In 2018, Clapp again managed Memphis to the PCL title, defeating the Fresno Grizzlies in 4 games. The Redbirds went on to defeat the International League champion Durham Bulls in the AAA Championship Game. Clapp was also named the 2018 PCL Manager of the Year, making him just the third manager in PCL history to win the award in consecutive seasons.

On October 29, 2018, the St. Louis Cardinals announced Clapp will be their first base coach for the 2019 season.

There is a Stubby Clapp bobblehead on display at the Canadian Baseball Hall of Fame, depicting him in a Memphis Redbirds uniform (the Triple A affiliate of the Cardinals).

== Personal life ==
Clapp is "Stubby the Third", a nickname passed on from his father (Keith Ezra "Stubby II" Clapp) and grandfather (David Ezra Oscar "Stubby" Clapp). He is married to Chastity, and they have three children.
