= Brian Schmack =

American baseball player and coach (born 1973)

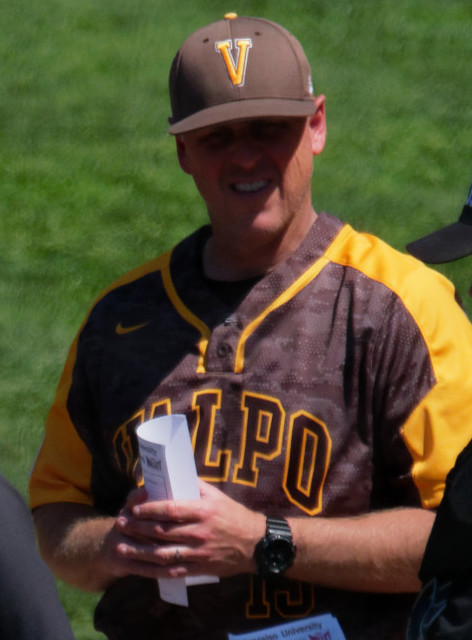
- Schmack with Valpo in 2018

Valparaiso Beacons
- Relief pitcher
- Born: December 7, 1973 (age 52); Chicago, Illinois, U.S.
- Batted: Right Threw: Right

MLB debut
- August 24, 2003, for the Detroit Tigers

Last MLB appearance
- September 27, 2003, for the Detroit Tigers

MLB statistics
- Win–loss record: 1–0
- Earned run average: 3.46
- Strikeouts: 4
- Stats at Baseball Reference

Teams
- Detroit Tigers (2003)

Brian Robert Schmack (born December 7, 1973) is an American baseball coach and former relief pitcher, who is the current head baseball coach of the Valparaiso Beacons.

== Playing career ==
Schmack played college baseball at Northern Illinois Huskies for coach Spanky McFarland from 1992 to 1995. He went undrafted out of Northern Illinois in 1995 and played for the independent Newark Bison of the Frontier League. In 1996, the Chicago White Sox signed him to a minor league deal.

Schmack spent five seasons in the White Sox' organization. After the 2000 season, the White Sox traded Schmack and Aaron Myette to the Texas Rangers for Royce Clayton. Schmack spent three seasons in the Rangers' organization before signing with the Detroit Tigers on November 19, 2002. He made his major league debut with the Tigers in 2003, playing 11 games with a 3.46 earned run average. In 2004, his final professional season, he pitched for the Double-A Erie SeaWolves and the Triple-A Toledo Mud Hens in the Tigers' organization.

== Coaching career ==
In 2007, Valparaiso University hired Schmack to be the pitching coach for the Valparaiso Beacons baseball team. He was promoted to associate head coach in 2011, and promoted to head coach prior to the 2014 season.

=== Yearly records ===
Below is a table of Schmack's yearly records as an NCAA head baseball coach.

Record table
Season	Team	Overall	Conference	Standing	Postseason
Valparaiso Crusaders (Horizon League) (2014–2017)
2014	Valparaiso	25–28	12–12	3rd	Horizon Tournament
2015	Valparaiso	22–31	15–14	3rd	Horizon Tournament
2016	Valparaiso	30–28	17–12	4th	Horizon Tournament
2017	Valparaiso	24–29	13–15	4th	Horizon Tournament
Valparaiso:			57–53		
Valparaiso Crusaders / Beacons (Missouri Valley Conference) (2018–present)
2018	Valparaiso	18–32	6–15	6th	Missouri Valley Tournament
2019	Valparaiso	14–36	6–15	7th	Missouri Valley Tournament
2020	Valparaiso	2–14	0–0		Season canceled due to COVID-19
2021	Valparaiso	16–35	9–19	8th	Missouri Valley Tournament
2022	Valparaiso	16–32	5–15		
2023	Valparaiso	20–27	10–17	T-7th	
2024	Valparaiso	14–38	6–21	9th	
2025	Valparaiso	10–40	5–22	10th	
2026	Valparaiso	12–38	5–19	9th	
Valparaiso:		223–408	52–143		
Total:		223–408			
National champion Postseason invitational champion Conference regular season champion Conference regular season and conference tournament champion Division regular season champion Division regular season and conference tournament champion Conference tournament champion

== See also ==
- List of current NCAA Division I baseball coaches
