= Garry Roque =

Canadian equestrian

Personal information
- Nationality: Canadian
- Born: 14 April 1960 (age 64); Paget, Bermuda

Sport
- Sport: Equestrian

Garry Roque (born 14 April 1960) is a Canadian equestrian. He competed in two events at the 2004 Summer Olympics. He had previously represented Bermuda.
