= Andy Stewart (baseball) =

Canadian baseball player (born 1970)

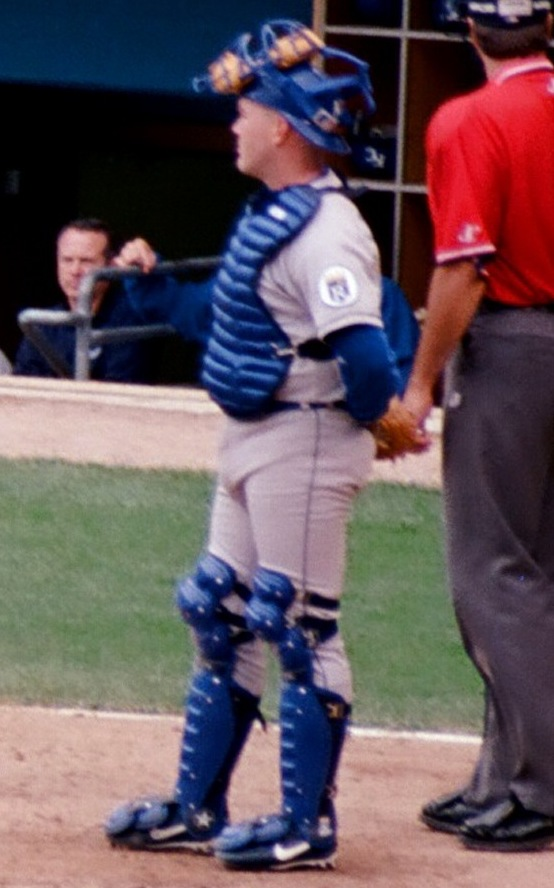
- Stewart with the Kansas City Royals in 1997
- Catcher
- Born: December 5, 1970 (age 55); Oshawa, Ontario, Canada
- Batted: Right Threw: Right

MLB debut
- September 6, 1997, for the Kansas City Royals

Last MLB appearance
- September 28, 1997, for the Kansas City Royals

MLB statistics
- Batting average: .250
- Home runs: 0
- Runs batted in: 0
- Stats at Baseball Reference

Teams
- Kansas City Royals (1997)

Medal record

Men's baseball

Representing Canada

Pan American Games
Bronze medal – third place	1999 Winnipeg	Team competition

Andrew David Stewart (born December 5, 1970) is a Canadian former Major League Baseball player for the Kansas City Royals.

Stewart hit a double in his first major league plate appearance in September 1997. He was part of Canada's 2004 Olympic Baseball Team in Athens, Greece, where he batted .416 after a four-year layoff coaching in the Toronto Blue Jays and Pittsburgh Pirates organizations. The Canadian team finished in fourth place.
