= Catherine Dunnette =

Canadian fencer (born 1980)

Personal information
- Born: May 14, 1980 (age 46) Calgary, Alberta, Canada

Sport
- Sport: Fencing
Medal record
Representing Canada
Pan American Games
Bronze medal – third place	2003 Santo Domingo	Individual épée

Catherine Dunnette (born May 14, 1980) is a Canadian fencer. She competed in the individual épée event at the 2004 Summer Olympics.
