= Sasha Olson =

Canadian softball player

Sasha Olson (born September 23, 1976) is a Canadian softball outfielder, and member of Canada women's national softball team for 4 years.

Olson began playing softball at age 17, and is a graduate of Simon Fraser University. She was a part of the Canadian Softball team who finished 5th at the 2004 Summer Olympics
