= Auburn Sigurdson =

Canadian softball player

Auburn Sigurdson (born April 6, 1981 in White Rock, British Columbia) is a Canadian Olympian, former softball pitcher, and now works as a marketing and communications professional in Vancouver, British Columbia. She has attended Simon Fraser University where she studied communications, and subsequently attended Emily Carr University of Art and Design and the British Columbia Institute of Technology, where she studied graphic design. She was a part of the Canadian Softball team who finished 5th at the 2004 Summer Olympics in Athens, Greece and now works to give back to the sport of softball as a Master Pitching Instructor within Softball Canada's CanPitch Program.

Both Auburn and her sister, Jesse, were pitchers and played together for SFU in 2003 and won NAIA national championships.

Sigurdson is married to former Toronto Blue Jays AGM Bart Given and has three children.

== International Softball Experience ==
- 2005 Pan American Championships/Worlds Qualifier (Silver)
- 2005 World Cup, Oklahoma (4th place)
- 2004 Olympic Games (5th place)
- 2004 Prague Cup (Gold)
- 2004 Australia/New Zealand Tour (3 tournaments)
- 2003 Pan American Games, Dominican Republic (Silver)
- 2003 US Cup, Hawaii (Silver)
- 2003 California Cup (Silver)
- 1998 - 2005 Canada Cup, Surrey, BC

== Professional Softball Experience ==
- 2006 Italian Professional Fastpitch League, Nuoro Softball, Terra Sarda (Sardegna)
- 2006 Copa Italia (Silver)
- 2005 National Pro Fastpitch League, New York/New Jersey Juggernaut (4th place)

== National Softball Experience ==
- Sr. Canadian National Championships - 2006 (Bronze)
- Jr. Canadian National Championships - 2003 (Silver)
- Sr. Canadian NationalChampionships - 2001
- Midget Canadian Championships - 1999 (Bronze)
- Sr. Canadian National Championships - 1998 (Bronze)

== Awards & Special Accomplishments ==
- Two time NAIA All-American
- NAIA Region I Player of the year in 2003
- NAIA National Champions (2003)
- NAIA All Tournament team (2003)
- NCAA Division I SunBelt All-Conference team (2000)
- MVP 1995 Western Canadians
- MVP 2000 Renegades Softball Club
