= 1999 World Wrestling Championships – Men's freestyle 58 kg =

Men's freestyle 58 kg at the 1999 World Championships
- Venue: Atatürk Sport Hall
- Dates: 8–10 October 1999
- Competitors: 33 from 33 nations

Medalists
gold medal	Harun Doğan	Turkey
silver medal	Alireza Dabir	Iran
bronze medal	Damir Zakhartdinov	Uzbekistan

The men's freestyle 58 kilograms is a competition featured at the 1999 World Wrestling Championships, and was held at the Atatürk Sport Hall in Ankara, Turkey from 8 to 10 October 1999.

== Results ==
Legend

- F — Won by fall

=== Preliminary round ===
==== Pool 1 ====
Pos	Athlete	Pld	W	L	CP	TP	USA	FRA	ALG
1	Eric Guerrero (USA)	2	2	0	7	17	—	7–3	10–0
2	David Leprince (FRA)	2	1	1	5	24	1–3 PP	—	21–1 Fall
3	Mohamed Amine Benhammadi (ALG)	2	0	2	0	1	0–4 ST	0–4 TO	—

Source: Official website

==== Pool 2 ====
Pos	Athlete	Pld	W	L	CP	TP	BUL	GER	BLR
1	Sevdalin Todorov (BUL)	2	1	1	5	11	—	1–3	10–0
2	Othmar Kuhner (GER)	2	1	1	4	9	3–1 PP	—	6–8
3	Aleksandr Guzov (BLR)	2	1	1	3	8	0–4 ST	3–1 PP	—

Source: Official website

==== Pool 3 ====
Pos	Athlete	Pld	W	L	CP	TP	TUR	MDA	POL
1	Harun Doğan (TUR)	2	2	0	7	19	—	6–1	13–3
2	Octavian Cuciuc (MDA)	2	1	1	5	26	1–3 PP	—	25–6 Fall
3	Tadeusz Kowalski (POL)	2	0	2	1	9	1–4 SP	0–4 TO	—

Source: Official website

==== Pool 4 ====
Pos	Athlete	Pld	W	L	CP	TP	KAZ	CHN	VEN
1	Murat Mambetov (KAZ)	2	2	0	7	11	—	8–2	3–0 Fall
2	Zhang Fan (CHN)	2	1	1	5	22	1–3 PP	—	20–2 Fall
3	David Ortiz (VEN)	2	0	2	0	2	0–4 TO	1–4 TO	—

Source: Official website

==== Pool 5 ====
Pos	Athlete	Pld	W	L	CP	TP	RUS	GEO	JPN
1	Miron Dzadzaev (RUS)	2	2	0	7	17	—	9–4	8–1 Fall
2	Otar Tushishvili (GEO)	2	1	1	4	10	1–3 PP	—	6–2
3	Yuji Ishijima (JPN)	2	0	2	1	3	0–4 TO	1–3 PP	—

Source: Official website

==== Pool 6 ====
Pos	Athlete	Pld	W	L	CP	TP	CUB	CAN	ROM
1	Yoendri Albear (CUB)	2	2	0	6	13	—	9–5	4–1
2	Guivi Sissaouri (CAN)	2	1	1	4	11	1–3 PP	—	6–2
3	Aurel Cimpoeru (ROM)	2	0	2	2	3	1–3 PP	1–3 PP	—

Source: Official website

==== Pool 7 ====
Pos	Athlete	Pld	W	L	CP	TP	HUN	AUS	TPE
1	Zsolt Bánkuti (HUN)	2	2	0	8	24	—	12–1	12–1
2	Brett Cash (AUS)	2	1	1	5	5	1–4 SP	—	4–0 Fall
3	Chen Jui-hsien (TPE)	2	0	2	1	1	1–4 SP	0–4 TO	—

Source: Official website

==== Pool 8 ====
Pos	Athlete	Pld	W	L	CP	TP	ARM	UZB	MKD
1	Martin Berberyan (ARM)	2	2	0	7	26	—	6–5	20–3
2	Damir Zakhartdinov (UZB)	2	1	1	5	21	1–3 PP	—	16–0 Fall
3	Gordan Nikolov (MKD)	2	0	2	1	3	1–4 SP	0–4 TO	—

Source: Official website

==== Pool 9 ====
Pos	Athlete	Pld	W	L	CP	TP	MGL	GRE	KOR
1	Oyuunbilegiin Pürevbaatar (MGL)	2	2	0	7	17	—	14–2	3–0
2	Chvitsa Polychronidis (GRE)	2	1	1	5	8	1–4 SP	—	6–3 Fall
3	Park Young-man (KOR)	2	0	2	0	3	0–3 PO	0–4 TO	—

Source: Official website

==== Pool 10 ====
Pos	Athlete	Pld	W	L	CP	TP	IRI	AZE	UKR
1	Alireza Dabir (IRI)	2	2	0	6	6	—	4–1	2–1
2	Arif Abdullayev (AZE)	2	1	1	4	6	1–3 PP	—	5–4
3	Yevhen Buslovych (UKR)	2	0	2	2	5	1–3 PP	1–3 PP	—

Source: Official website

==== Pool 11 ====
Pos	Athlete	Pld	W	L	CP	TP	SVK	KGZ	ITA
1	Andrej Fašánek (SVK)	2	1	1	5	6	—	5–3 Fall	1–6
2	Ruslanbek Madjinov (KGZ)	2	1	1	4	9	0–4 TO	—	6–6 Fall
3	Michele Liuzzi (ITA)	2	1	1	3	12	3–1 PP	0–4 TO	—

Source: Official website

=== Knockout round ===
Round of 16
Eric Guerrero (USA)	6
Sevdalin Todorov (BUL)	1
Harun Doğan (TUR)	5
Murat Mambetov (KAZ)	2
Miron Dzadzaev (RUS)	8
Yoendri Albear (CUB)	5
Zsolt Bánkuti (HUN)	4
Martin Berberyan (ARM)	5
Oyuunbilegiin Pürevbaatar (MGL)	2
Alireza Dabir (IRI)	4
Andrej Fašánek (SVK)	11
David Leprince (FRA)	0
Octavian Cuciuc (MDA)	4
Zhang Fan (CHN)	1
Damir Zakhartdinov (UZB)	8
Chvitsa Polychronidis (GRE)	1

Quarterfinals
Eric Guerrero (USA)	3
Harun Doğan (TUR)	6
Miron Dzadzaev (RUS)	3
Martin Berberyan (ARM)	13
Alireza Dabir (IRI)	5^{F}
Andrej Fašánek (SVK)	0
Octavian Cuciuc (MDA)	4
Damir Zakhartdinov (UZB)	7

Semifinals
Harun Doğan (TUR)	9
Martin Berberyan (ARM)	2
Alireza Dabir (IRI)	3
Damir Zakhartdinov (UZB)	0

Final
Harun Doğan (TUR)	3
Alireza Dabir (IRI)	1
Bronze medal match
Martin Berberyan (ARM)	4
Damir Zakhartdinov (UZB)	9
