= 1998 World Wrestling Championships – Men's freestyle 58 kg =

Men's freestyle 58 kg at the 1998 World Championships
- Venue: Azadi Indoor Stadium
- Dates: 9–11 September 1998
- Competitors: 26 from 26 nations

Medalists
gold medal	Alireza Dabir	Iran
silver medal	Harun Doğan	Turkey
bronze medal	Guivi Sissaouri	Canada

The men's freestyle 58 kilograms is a competition featured at the 1998 World Wrestling Championships, and was held at the Azadi Indoor Stadium in Tehran, Iran from 9 to 11 September 1998.

== Results ==
=== Round 1 ===
	Score	
Round of 32
Jung Jin-hyuk (KOR)	7–6	Oyuunbilegiin Pürevbaatar (MGL)
Zhang Fan (CHN)	0–7	Alireza Dabir (IRI)
Ramil Islamov (UZB)	14–2	Tony Purler (USA)
Adrian Stratu (ROM)	7–3	Elman Asgarov (AZE)
Jamal Al-Ahmad (SYR)	0–10	Guivi Sissaouri (CAN)
Vyacheslav Sianyuk (BLR)	3–4	Sevdalin Todorov (BUL)
Rakesh Kumar (IND)	2–3	Sanshiro Abe (JPN)
Harun Doğan (TUR)	1–0	Murad Umakhanov (RUS)
David Pogosian (GEO)	2–3	Yevhen Buslovych (UKR)
Jan Smit (RSA)	0–11	Murat Mambetov (KAZ)
Fazlı Yeter (GER)	3–0	Cory O'Brien (AUS)
Luis Cortés (COL)	0–9	Ruslanbek Madjinov (KGZ)
Octavian Cuciuc (MDA)	1–3	Tadeusz Kowalski (POL)

=== Round 2 ===
	Score	
Round of 16
Jung Jin-hyuk (KOR)	2–3	Alireza Dabir (IRI)
Ramil Islamov (UZB)	6–0	Adrian Stratu (ROM)
Guivi Sissaouri (CAN)	5–1	Sevdalin Todorov (BUL)
Sanshiro Abe (JPN)	1–6	Harun Doğan (TUR)
Yevhen Buslovych (UKR)	4–5	Murat Mambetov (KAZ)
Fazlı Yeter (GER)	2–4	Ruslanbek Madjinov (KGZ)
Tadeusz Kowalski (POL)		Bye
Repechage
Oyuunbilegiin Pürevbaatar (MGL)	5–0	Zhang Fan (CHN)
Tony Purler (USA)	13–12	Elman Asgarov (AZE)
Jamal Al-Ahmad (SYR)	0–6 Fall	Vyacheslav Sianyuk (BLR)
Rakesh Kumar (IND)	3–14	Murad Umakhanov (RUS)
David Pogosian (GEO)	10–1	Jan Smit (RSA)
Cory O'Brien (AUS)	10–0	Luis Cortés (COL)
Octavian Cuciuc (MDA)		Bye

=== Round 3 ===
	Score	
Quarterfinals
Tadeusz Kowalski (POL)	0–12	Alireza Dabir (IRI)
Ramil Islamov (UZB)	0–4	Guivi Sissaouri (CAN)
Harun Doğan (TUR)	1–0	Murat Mambetov (KAZ)
Ruslanbek Madjinov (KGZ)		Bye
Repechage
Octavian Cuciuc (MDA)	1–4	Oyuunbilegiin Pürevbaatar (MGL)
Tony Purler (USA)	2–10	Vyacheslav Sianyuk (BLR)
Murad Umakhanov (RUS)	3–1	David Pogosian (GEO)
Cory O'Brien (AUS)	0–10	Jung Jin-hyuk (KOR)
Adrian Stratu (ROM)	1–3	Sevdalin Todorov (BUL)
Sanshiro Abe (JPN)	0–5	Yevhen Buslovych (UKR)
Fazlı Yeter (GER)		Bye

=== Round 4 ===
	Score	
Repechage
Fazlı Yeter (GER)	1–4	Oyuunbilegiin Pürevbaatar (MGL)
Vyacheslav Sianyuk (BLR)	5–15	Murad Umakhanov (RUS)
Jung Jin-hyuk (KOR)	3–0	Sevdalin Todorov (BUL)
Yevhen Buslovych (UKR)	12–9	Tadeusz Kowalski (POL)
Ramil Islamov (UZB)	5–0	Murat Mambetov (KAZ)

=== Round 5 ===
	Score	
Semifinals
Ruslanbek Madjinov (KGZ)	3–8 Fall	Alireza Dabir (IRI)
Guivi Sissaouri (CAN)	1–4	Harun Doğan (TUR)
Repechage
Oyuunbilegiin Pürevbaatar (MGL)	1–4	Murad Umakhanov (RUS)
Jung Jin-hyuk (KOR)	3–5	Yevhen Buslovych (UKR)
Ramil Islamov (UZB)		Bye

=== Round 6 ===
	Score	
Repechage
Ramil Islamov (UZB)	3–4	Murad Umakhanov (RUS)
Yevhen Buslovych (UKR)		Bye

=== Round 7 ===
	Score	
Repechage
Ruslanbek Madjinov (KGZ)	7–5 Fall	Yevhen Buslovych (UKR)
Murad Umakhanov (RUS)	1–5	Guivi Sissaouri (CAN)

=== Finals ===
	Score	
Bronze medal match
Ruslanbek Madjinov (KGZ)	2–4	Guivi Sissaouri (CAN)
Final
Alireza Dabir (IRI)	1–1	Harun Doğan (TUR)
