= 1997 World Wrestling Championships – Men's freestyle 58 kg =

Men's freestyle 58 kg at the 1997 World Championships
- Venue: Yenisey Sports Palace
- Dates: 29–31 August 1997
- Competitors: 27 from 27 nations

Medalists
gold medal	Mohammad Talaei	Iran
silver medal	Ramil Islamov	Uzbekistan
bronze medal	Guivi Sissaouri	Canada

The men's freestyle 58 kilograms is a competition featured at the 1997 World Wrestling Championships, and was held at the Yenisey Sports Palace in Krasnoyarsk, Russia from 29 to 31 August 1997.

== Medalists ==
Gold	Mohammad Talaei; Iran
Silver	Ramil Islamov; Uzbekistan
Bronze	Guivi Sissaouri; Canada

== Results ==
Legend

- WO — Won by walkover

=== Round 1 ===
	Score	
Round of 32
Tadeusz Kowalski (POL)	3–8	Murad Umakhanov (RUS)
Guivi Sissaouri (CAN)	3–2	Mikalai Savin (BLR)
Sanshiro Abe (JPN)	12–0 Fall	Marcos Ventura (BRA)
Cory O'Brien (AUS)	0–4 Fall	Serafim Barzakov (BUL)
Oyuunbilegiin Pürevbaatar (MGL)	0–4	Mohammad Talaei (IRI)
Tony Purler (USA)	0–12	Šaban Trstena (MKD)
Ali Rakhmatov (TJK)	12–6	Yoendri Albear (CUB)
Jung Jin-hyuk (KOR)	8–3	Jo Yong-guk (PRK)
Michele Liuzzi (ITA)	6–1	Murat Mambetov (KAZ)
Harun Doğan (TUR)	1–0	Ruslanbek Madjinov (KGZ)
Mikhail Chernov (UKR)	10–0	Javier Sánchez (MEX)
Ľuboš Čikel (SVK)	10–0	David Ortiz (VEN)
Arif Abdullayev (AZE)	5–7	Ramil Islamov (UZB)
Karo Simonyan (ARM)		Bye

=== Round 2 ===
	Score	
Round of 16
Karo Simonyan (ARM)	0–11	Murad Umakhanov (RUS)
Guivi Sissaouri (CAN)	4–3	Sanshiro Abe (JPN)
Serafim Barzakov (BUL)	5–6	Mohammad Talaei (IRI)
Šaban Trstena (MKD)	3–7	Ali Rakhmatov (TJK)
Jung Jin-hyuk (KOR)	4–1	Michele Liuzzi (ITA)
Harun Doğan (TUR)	2–1	Mikhail Chernov (UKR)
Ľuboš Čikel (SVK)	1–5	Ramil Islamov (UZB)
Repechage
Tadeusz Kowalski (POL)	7–4	Mikalai Savin (BLR)
Marcos Ventura (BRA)	0–10	Cory O'Brien (AUS)
Oyuunbilegiin Pürevbaatar (MGL)	11–16	Tony Purler (USA)
Yoendri Albear (CUB)	1–11	Jo Yong-guk (PRK)
Murat Mambetov (KAZ)	6–4	Ruslanbek Madjinov (KGZ)
Javier Sánchez (MEX)	3–1	David Ortiz (VEN)
Arif Abdullayev (AZE)		Bye

=== Round 3 ===
	Score	
Quarterfinals
Murad Umakhanov (RUS)	1–3	Guivi Sissaouri (CAN)
Mohammad Talaei (IRI)	WO	Ali Rakhmatov (TJK)
Jung Jin-hyuk (KOR)	4–0	Harun Doğan (TUR)
Ramil Islamov (UZB)		Bye
Repechage
Arif Abdullayev (AZE)	9–0	Tadeusz Kowalski (POL)
Cory O'Brien (AUS)	1–11	Tony Purler (USA)
Jo Yong-guk (PRK)	1–7	Murat Mambetov (KAZ)
Javier Sánchez (MEX)	0–12	Karo Simonyan (ARM)
Sanshiro Abe (JPN)	3–8	Serafim Barzakov (BUL)
Šaban Trstena (MKD)	WO	Michele Liuzzi (ITA)
Mikhail Chernov (UKR)	10–0	Ľuboš Čikel (SVK)

=== Round 4 ===
	Score	
Repechage
Arif Abdullayev (AZE)	10–4	Tony Purler (USA)
Murat Mambetov (KAZ)	5–6	Karo Simonyan (ARM)
Serafim Barzakov (BUL)	5–4	Michele Liuzzi (ITA)
Mikhail Chernov (UKR)	1–9 Fall	Murad Umakhanov (RUS)
Harun Doğan (TUR)		Bye

=== Round 5 ===
	Score	
Semifinals
Ramil Islamov (UZB)	3–1	Guivi Sissaouri (CAN)
Mohammad Talaei (IRI)	4–1	Jung Jin-hyuk (KOR)
Repechage
Harun Doğan (TUR)	1–6	Arif Abdullayev (AZE)
Karo Simonyan (ARM)	0–9	Serafim Barzakov (BUL)
Murad Umakhanov (RUS)		Bye

=== Round 6 ===
	Score	
Repechage
Murad Umakhanov (RUS)	8–0	Arif Abdullayev (AZE)
Serafim Barzakov (BUL)		Bye

=== Round 7 ===
	Score	
Repechage
Guivi Sissaouri (CAN)	4–3	Serafim Barzakov (BUL)
Murad Umakhanov (RUS)	12–2	Jung Jin-hyuk (KOR)

=== Finals ===
	Score	
5th place match
Serafim Barzakov (BUL)	7–4	Jung Jin-hyuk (KOR)
Bronze medal match
Guivi Sissaouri (CAN)	3–0	Murad Umakhanov (RUS)
Final
Ramil Islamov (UZB)	1–2	Mohammad Talaei (IRI)
