= 2001 World Wrestling Championships – Men's freestyle 58 kg =

Men's freestyle 58 kg at the 2001 World Championships
- Venue: Winter Sports Palace
- Dates: 23–25 November 2001
- Competitors: 33 from 33 nations

Medalists
| gold medal | Guivi Sissaouri | Canada |
| silver medal | Oyuunbilegiin Pürevbaatar | Mongolia |
| bronze medal | David Pogosian | Georgia |

The men's freestyle 58 kilograms is a competition featured at the 2001 World Wrestling Championships, and was held at the Winter Sports Palace in Sofia, Bulgaria from 23 to 25 November 2001.

== Results ==
=== Preliminary round ===
==== Pool 1 ====
| Pos | Athlete | Pld | W | L | CP | TP | KAZ | JPN | TUR |
|---|---|---|---|---|---|---|---|---|---|
| 1 | Abil Ibragimov (KAZ) | 2 | 2 | 0 | 6 | 15 | — | 8–5 | 7–2 |
| 2 | Hiroki Sekikawa (JPN) | 2 | 1 | 1 | 4 | 8 | 1–3 PP | — | 3–0 |
| 3 | Harun Doğan (TUR) | 2 | 0 | 2 | 1 | 2 | 1–3 PP | 0–3 PO | — |

Source: Official website

==== Pool 2 ====
| Pos | Athlete | Pld | W | L | CP | TP | MGL | BLR | EST |
|---|---|---|---|---|---|---|---|---|---|
| 1 | Oyuunbilegiin Pürevbaatar (MGL) | 2 | 2 | 0 | 6 | 13 | — | 4–0 | 9–0 |
| 2 | Aliaksandr Karnitski (BLR) | 2 | 1 | 1 | 4 | 10 | 0–3 PO | — | 10–0 |
| 3 | Jaanek Lips (EST) | 2 | 0 | 2 | 0 | 0 | 0–3 PO | 0–4 ST | — |

Source: Official website

==== Pool 3 ====
| Pos | Athlete | Pld | W | L | CP | TP | IRI | UZB | MDA |
|---|---|---|---|---|---|---|---|---|---|
| 1 | Behnam Tayyebi (IRI) | 2 | 2 | 0 | 6 | 6 | — | 3–3 | 3–2 |
| 2 | Damir Zakhartdinov (UZB) | 2 | 1 | 1 | 4 | 8 | 1–3 PP | — | 5–2 |
| 3 | Serghei Lungu (MDA) | 2 | 0 | 2 | 2 | 4 | 1–3 PP | 1–3 PP | — |

Source: Official website

==== Pool 4 ====
| Pos | Athlete | Pld | W | L | CP | TP | CUB | KOR | VIE |
|---|---|---|---|---|---|---|---|---|---|
| 1 | Yandro Quintana (CUB) | 2 | 2 | 0 | 6 | 14 | — | 6–0 | 8–1 |
| 2 | Song Jae-myung (KOR) | 2 | 1 | 1 | 4 | 4 | 0–3 PO | — | 4–2 Fall |
| 3 | Đới Đăng Hỷ (VIE) | 2 | 0 | 2 | 1 | 3 | 1–3 PP | 0–4 TO | — |

Source: Official website

==== Pool 5 ====
| Pos | Athlete | Pld | W | L | CP | TP | GEO | GER | TKM |
|---|---|---|---|---|---|---|---|---|---|
| 1 | David Pogosian (GEO) | 2 | 2 | 0 | 6 | 16 | — | 7–0 | 9–1 |
| 2 | Othmar Kuhner (GER) | 2 | 1 | 1 | 4 | 10 | 0–3 PO | — | 10–0 |
| 3 | Rowşan Seýidow (TKM) | 2 | 0 | 2 | 1 | 1 | 1–3 PP | 0–4 ST | — |

Source: Official website

==== Pool 6 ====
| Pos | Athlete | Pld | W | L | CP | TP | ROM | POL | PUR |
|---|---|---|---|---|---|---|---|---|---|
| 1 | Petru Toarcă (ROM) | 2 | 2 | 0 | 7 | 18 | — | 8–1 | 10–2 Fall |
| 2 | Łukasz Góral (POL) | 2 | 1 | 1 | 4 | 7 | 1–3 PP | — | 6–4 |
| 3 | Arnel Kernizan (PUR) | 2 | 0 | 2 | 1 | 6 | 0–4 TO | 1–3 PP | — |

Source: Official website

==== Pool 7 ====
| Pos | Athlete | Pld | W | L | CP | TP | RUS | ARM | IND |
|---|---|---|---|---|---|---|---|---|---|
| 1 | Zelimkhan Huseynov (RUS) | 2 | 2 | 0 | 7 | 19 | — | 12–1 Fall | 7–2 |
| 2 | Martin Berberyan (ARM) | 2 | 1 | 1 | 3 | 7 | 0–4 TO | — | 6–4 |
| 3 | Sushil Kumar (IND) | 2 | 0 | 2 | 2 | 6 | 1–3 PP | 1–3 PP | — |

Source: Official website

==== Pool 8 ====
| Pos | Athlete | Pld | W | L | CP | TP | CAN | USA | EGY |
|---|---|---|---|---|---|---|---|---|---|
| 1 | Guivi Sissaouri (CAN) | 2 | 2 | 0 | 7 | 19 | — | 8–3 | 11–0 |
| 2 | Eric Guerrero (USA) | 2 | 1 | 1 | 5 | 14 | 1–3 PP | — | 11–0 |
| 3 | Ali Mohamed Abutaleb (EGY) | 2 | 0 | 2 | 0 | 0 | 0–4 ST | 0–4 ST | — |

Source: Official website

==== Pool 9 ====
| Pos | Athlete | Pld | W | L | CP | TP | UKR | CZE | GBR |
|---|---|---|---|---|---|---|---|---|---|
| 1 | Vasyl Fedoryshyn (UKR) | 2 | 2 | 0 | 7 | 17 | — | 10–0 | 7–2 |
| 2 | Luděk Burian (CZE) | 2 | 1 | 1 | 3 | 8 | 0–4 ST | — | 8–5 |
| 3 | Andrew Hutchinson (GBR) | 2 | 0 | 2 | 2 | 7 | 1–3 PP | 1–3 PP | — |

Source: Official website

==== Pool 10 ====
| Pos | Athlete | Pld | W | L | CP | TP | BUL | HUN | PER |
|---|---|---|---|---|---|---|---|---|---|
| 1 | Anatolie Guidea (BUL) | 2 | 2 | 0 | 7 | 16 | — | 3–2 | 13–1 |
| 2 | Zsolt Bánkuti (HUN) | 2 | 1 | 1 | 5 | 14 | 1–3 PP | — | 12–1 |
| 3 | Sidney Guzman (PER) | 2 | 0 | 2 | 2 | 2 | 1–4 SP | 1–4 SP | — |

Source: Official website

==== Pool 11 ====
| Pos | Athlete | Pld | W | L | CP | TP | AZE | KGZ | GRE |
|---|---|---|---|---|---|---|---|---|---|
| 1 | Arif Abdullayev (AZE) | 2 | 2 | 0 | 6 | 13 | — | 3–1 | 10–1 |
| 2 | Suimonkul Tabaldy Uulu (KGZ) | 2 | 1 | 1 | 4 | 4 | 1–3 PP | — | 3–1 |
| 3 | Themis Iakovidis (GRE) | 2 | 0 | 2 | 2 | 2 | 1–3 PP | 1–3 PP | — |

Source: Official website

=== Knockout round ===
Round of 16
Abil Ibragimov (KAZ) | 0
Oyuunbilegiin Pürevbaatar (MGL) | 3
Behnam Tayyebi (IRI) | 0
Yandro Quintana (CUB) | 4
David Pogosian (GEO) | 6
Petru Toarcă (ROM) | 3

Quarterfinals
Oyuunbilegiin Pürevbaatar (MGL) | 6
Yandro Quintana (CUB) | 2
David Pogosian (GEO) | 3
Zelimkhan Huseynov (RUS) | 1
Guivi Sissaouri (CAN) | 7
Vasyl Fedoryshyn (UKR) | 5
Anatolie Guidea (BUL) | 6
Arif Abdullayev (AZE) | 4

Semifinals
Oyuunbilegiin Pürevbaatar (MGL) | 5
David Pogosian (GEO) | 1
Guivi Sissaouri (CAN) | 4
Anatolie Guidea (BUL) | 0

Final
Oyuunbilegiin Pürevbaatar (MGL) | 2
Guivi Sissaouri (CAN) | 5
Bronze medal match
David Pogosian (GEO) | 3
Anatolie Guidea (BUL) | 0
