= 2005 World Wrestling Championships – Men's freestyle 60 kg =

Men's freestyle 60 kg at the 2005 World Championships
- Venue: László Papp Budapest Sports Arena
- Dates: 26 September 2005
- Competitors: 32 from 32 nations

Medalists
gold medal	Alan Dudaev	Russia
silver medal	Yandro Quintana	Cuba
bronze medal	Martin Berberyan	Armenia
bronze medal	Morad Mohammadi	Iran

The men's freestyle 60 kilograms is a competition featured at the 2005 World Wrestling Championships, and was held at the László Papp Budapest Sports Arena in Budapest, Hungary on 26 September 2005.

This freestyle wrestling competition consists of a single-elimination tournament, with a repechage used to determine the winner of two bronze medals.

== Results ==
Legend

- F — Won by fall

=== Final ===
Final
Alan Dudaev (RUS)	2	0	3
Yandro Quintana (CUB)	2	1	1

=== Top half ===
Round of 32
Martin Berberyan (ARM)	4	1	2
Andrej Fašánek (SVK)	1	2	0
Ilie Esir (MDA)	1	1
Anatolie Guidea (BUL)	0	1
Petru Toarcă (ROM)	0	0
Alan Dudaev (RUS)	2	2
Aliaksandr Karnitski (BLR)	0	0
Song Jae-myung (KOR)	1	1
Kamil Yilmaz (GER)	5	1	0
Andrius Voitechovskis (LTU)	2	3	2
Gergõ Wöller (HUN)	2	3
Jaanek Lips (EST)	0	0
Abdulqader Omar (QAT)	0	1
Abil Ibragimov (AZE)	3	6
Łukasz Góral (POL)	1	1	0
Levan Chabradze (GEO)	1	1	3

Round of 16
Martin Berberyan (ARM)	3	3
Ilie Esir (MDA)	0	1
Alan Dudaev (RUS)	1	2
Song Jae-myung (KOR)	1	1
Andrius Voitechovskis (LTU)	0	0
Gergõ Wöller (HUN)	2	2
Abil Ibragimov (AZE)	0	0
Levan Chabradze (GEO)	4	2

Quarterfinals
Martin Berberyan (ARM)	0	0
Alan Dudaev (RUS)	3	2
Gergõ Wöller (HUN)	1	1	0
Levan Chabradze (GEO)	1	0	1

Semifinals
Alan Dudaev (RUS)	4	4
Levan Chabradze (GEO)	0	0

=== Bottom half ===
Round of 32
Didier Païs (FRA)	1	0	0
Bauyrzhan Orazgaliyev (KAZ)	1	4	1
Oyuunbilegiin Pürevbaatar (MGL)	1	1	4
Murad Ramazanov (MKD)	0	1	2
Tevfik Odabaşı (TUR)	0	1	4
Mike Lightner (USA)	2	0	0
Kenichi Yumoto (JPN)	0	0
Yandro Quintana (CUB)	3	3
Hassan Madani (EGY)	0	0
Guivi Sissaouri (CAN)	4	6
Damir Zakhartdinov (UZB)	0	0
Ri Yong-chol (PRK)	1	2
Ulan Nadyrbek Uulu (KGZ)	0	0
Vasyl Fedoryshyn (UKR)	5	3
Morad Mohammadi (IRI)	3	2
Qin He (CHN)	0	0

Round of 16
Bauyrzhan Orazgaliyev (KAZ)	1	1	0
Oyuunbilegiin Pürevbaatar (MGL)	0	2	1
Tevfik Odabaşı (TUR)	0	3
Yandro Quintana (CUB)	1	3
Guivi Sissaouri (CAN)	3	3
Ri Yong-chol (PRK)	2	1
Vasyl Fedoryshyn (UKR)	1	0	0
Morad Mohammadi (IRI)	1	1	1

Quarterfinals
Oyuunbilegiin Pürevbaatar (MGL)	0
Yandro Quintana (CUB)	4^{F}
Guivi Sissaouri (CAN)	1	1
Morad Mohammadi (IRI)	3	3

Semifinals
Yandro Quintana (CUB)	1	1
Morad Mohammadi (IRI)	0	0

=== Repechage ===
Repechage round 1
Petru Toarcă (ROM)	5	0	0
Song Jae-myung (KOR)	0	2	2
Kenichi Yumoto (JPN)	2	4
Tevfik Odabaşı (TUR)	1	1

Repechage round 2
Song Jae-myung (KOR)	1	1
Martin Berberyan (ARM)	4	3
Kenichi Yumoto (JPN)	0	1
Oyuunbilegiin Pürevbaatar (MGL)	1	1

Bronze medals
Martin Berberyan (ARM)	2	1
Levan Chabradze (GEO)	0	1
Oyuunbilegiin Pürevbaatar (MGL)	0	0
Morad Mohammadi (IRI)	3	1
