= Wrestling at the 2000 Summer Olympics – Men's freestyle 58 kg =

Men's freestyle 58 kg at the Games of the XXVII Olympiad
- Venue: Sydney Convention and Exhibition Centre
- Date: 29 September – 1 October 2000
- Competitors: 20 from 20 nations

Medalists
1st place, gold medalist(s)		Alireza Dabir	Iran
2nd place, silver medalist(s)		Yevhen Buslovych	Ukraine
3rd place, bronze medalist(s)		Terry Brands	United States

The men's freestyle 58 kilograms at the 2000 Summer Olympics as part of the wrestling program was held at the Sydney Convention and Exhibition Centre from September 29 to October 1. The competition held with an elimination system of three or four wrestlers in each pool, with the winners qualify for the quarterfinals, semifinals and final by way of direct elimination.

== Schedule ==
All times are Australian Eastern Daylight Time (UTC+11:00)

Date	Time	Event
29 September 2000	09:30	Round 1
29 September 2000	17:00	Round 2
30 September 2000	09:30	Round 3
1 October 2000	09:00	Quarterfinals
1 October 2000	09:00	Semifinals
1 October 2000	14:30	Finals

== Results ==
Legend

- WO — Won by walkover

=== Elimination pools ===
==== Pool 1 ====
Pos	Athlete	Pld	W	L	CP	TP	Qualification
1	Alireza Dabir (IRI)	2	2	0	7	13	Knockout round
2	Guivi Sissaouri (CAN)	2	1	1	4	0	
3	Talata Embalo (GBS)	2	0	2	0	0	

Source: Official Report

	Score		CP
Alireza Dabir (IRI)	10–0	Talata Embalo (GBS)	4–0 ST
Guivi Sissaouri (CAN)	0–3	Alireza Dabir (IRI)	0–3 PO
Talata Embalo (GBS)	WO	Guivi Sissaouri (CAN)	0–4 EF

==== Pool 2 ====
Pos	Athlete	Pld	W	L	CP	TP	Qualification
1	Oyuunbilegiin Pürevbaatar (MGL)	2	2	0	6	15	Knockout round
2	Aleksandr Guzov (BLR)	2	1	1	5	15	
3	Cory O'Brien (AUS)	2	0	2	1	4	

Source: Official Report

	Score		CP
Cory O'Brien (AUS)	0–9	Oyuunbilegiin Pürevbaatar (MGL)	0–3 PO
Aleksandr Guzov (BLR)	14–4	Cory O'Brien (AUS)	4–1 SP
Oyuunbilegiin Pürevbaatar (MGL)	6–1	Aleksandr Guzov (BLR)	3–1 PP

==== Pool 3 ====
Pos	Athlete	Pld	W	L	CP	TP	Qualification
1	David Pogosian (GEO)	2	2	0	6	7	Knockout round
2	Ri Yong-sam (PRK)	2	1	1	4	6	
3	Andrej Fašánek (SVK)	2	0	2	2	2	

Source: Official Report

	Score		CP
Ri Yong-sam (PRK)	1–2	David Pogosian (GEO)	1–3 PP
Andrej Fašánek (SVK)	1–5	Ri Yong-sam (PRK)	1–3 PP
David Pogosian (GEO)	5–1	Andrej Fašánek (SVK)	3–1 PP

==== Pool 4 ====
Pos	Athlete	Pld	W	L	CP	TP	Qualification
1	Terry Brands (USA)	2	2	0	7	14	Knockout round
2	Chvitsa Polychronidis (GRE)	2	1	1	5	6	
3	Abil Ibragimov (KAZ)	2	0	2	0	6	

Source: Official Report

	Score		CP
Abil Ibragimov (KAZ)	6–5 Fall	Chvitsa Polychronidis (GRE)	0–4 TO
Terry Brands (USA)	6–0 Fall	Abil Ibragimov (KAZ)	4–0 TO
Chvitsa Polychronidis (GRE)	1–8	Terry Brands (USA)	1–3 PP

==== Pool 5 ====
Pos	Athlete	Pld	W	L	CP	TP	Qualification
1	Damir Zakhartdinov (UZB)	3	2	1	8	9	Knockout round
2	Murad Ramazanov (RUS)	3	2	1	7	4	
3	Octavian Cuciuc (MDA)	3	1	2	4	5	
4	Harun Doğan (TUR)	3	1	2	3	6	

Source: Official Report

	Score		CP
Octavian Cuciuc (MDA)	2–6	Harun Doğan (TUR)	1–3 PP
Murad Ramazanov (RUS)	4–1	Damir Zakhartdinov (UZB)	3–1 PP
Octavian Cuciuc (MDA)	3–0	Murad Ramazanov (RUS)	3–0 PO
Harun Doğan (TUR)	0–3	Damir Zakhartdinov (UZB)	0–3 PO
Octavian Cuciuc (MDA)	0–5 Fall	Damir Zakhartdinov (UZB)	0–4 TO
Harun Doğan (TUR)	WO	Murad Ramazanov (RUS)	0–4 EF

==== Pool 6 ====
Pos	Athlete	Pld	W	L	CP	TP	Qualification
1	Yevhen Buslovych (UKR)	3	3	0	9 (Note: Head-to-head result: UKR 3–1 ARM.)	16	Knockout round
2	Martin Berberyan (ARM)	3	2	1	9	26	
3	Arif Abdullayev (AZE)	3	1	2	5	14	
4	Othmar Kuhner (GER)	3	0	3	3	8	

Source: Official Report
Notes:

	Score		CP
Othmar Kuhner (GER)	5–8	Arif Abdullayev (AZE)	1–3 PP
Martin Berberyan (ARM)	1–5	Yevhen Buslovych (UKR)	1–3 PP
Othmar Kuhner (GER)	2–14	Martin Berberyan (ARM)	1–4 SP
Arif Abdullayev (AZE)	5–7	Yevhen Buslovych (UKR)	1–3 PP
Othmar Kuhner (GER)	1–4	Yevhen Buslovych (UKR)	1–3 PP
Arif Abdullayev (AZE)	1–11	Martin Berberyan (ARM)	1–4 SP

=== Knockout round ===
Quarterfinals
Alireza Dabir (IRI)	5
Oyuunbilegiin Pürevbaatar (MGL)	2
David Pogosian (GEO)	2
Terry Brands (USA)	4

Semifinals
Alireza Dabir (IRI)	6
Terry Brands (USA)	4
Damir Zakhartdinov (UZB)	0
Yevhen Buslovych (UKR)	2

Gold medal match
Alireza Dabir (IRI)	3
Yevhen Buslovych (UKR)	0
Bronze medal match
Terry Brands (USA)	3
Damir Zakhartdinov (UZB)	2

Classification 5th–6th
Oyuunbilegiin Pürevbaatar (MGL)	6
David Pogosian (GEO)	0

== Final standing ==
Rank	Athlete
1st place, gold medalist(s)	Alireza Dabir (IRI)
2nd place, silver medalist(s)	Yevhen Buslovych (UKR)
3rd place, bronze medalist(s)	Terry Brands (USA)
4	Damir Zakhartdinov (UZB)
5	David Pogosian (GEO)
6	Martin Berberyan (ARM)
7	Murad Ramazanov (RUS)
8	Aleksandr Guzov (BLR)
9	Arif Abdullayev (AZE)
10	Chvitsa Polychronidis (GRE)
11	Ri Yong-sam (PRK)
12	Octavian Cuciuc (MDA)
13	Guivi Sissaouri (CAN)
14	Othmar Kuhner (GER)
15	Harun Doğan (TUR)
16	Andrej Fašánek (SVK)
17	Cory O'Brien (AUS)
18	Abil Ibragimov (KAZ)
19	Talata Embalo (GBS)
DQ	Oyuunbilegiin Pürevbaatar (MGL)

- Oyuunbilegiin Pürevbaatar of Mongolia originally placed fifth, but was disqualified after he tested positive for Furosemide.
