= 2002 World Wrestling Championships – Men's freestyle 60 kg =

Men's freestyle 60 kg at the 2002 World Championships
- Venue: Azadi Indoor Stadium
- Dates: 6–7 September 2002
- Competitors: 27 from 27 nations

Medalists
gold medal	Aram Margaryan	Armenia
silver medal	Oyuunbilegiin Pürevbaatar	Mongolia
bronze medal	Mohammad Talaei	Iran

The men's freestyle 60 kilograms is a competition featured at the 2002 World Wrestling Championships, and was held at the Azadi Indoor Stadium in Tehran, Iran from 6 to 7 September 2002.

== Results ==
=== Preliminary round ===
==== Pool 1 ====
Pos	Athlete	Pld	W	L	CP	TP	IRI	MDA	BLR
1	Mohammad Talaei (IRI)	2	2	0	6	10	—	6–0	4–2
2	Ilie Esir (MDA)	2	1	1	3	3	0–3 PO	—	3–2
3	Aleksandr Guzov (BLR)	2	0	2	2	4	1–3 PP	1–3 PP	—

Source: Official website

==== Pool 2 ====
Pos	Athlete	Pld	W	L	CP	TP	AZE	KOR	HUN
1	Arif Abdullayev (AZE)	2	2	0	7	14	—	4–0	10–0
2	Hwang Woong-hwan (KOR)	2	1	1	3	3	0–3 PO	—	3–1
3	Zsolt Bánkuti (HUN)	2	0	2	1	1	0–4 ST	1–3 PP	—

Source: Official website

==== Pool 3 ====
Pos	Athlete	Pld	W	L	CP	TP	ROM	GRE	IRQ
1	Petru Toarcă (ROM)	2	2	0	7	20	—	10–7	10–0
2	Besik Aslanasvili (GRE)	2	1	1	5	17	1–3 PP	—	10–0
3	Ali Mohammed (IRQ)	2	0	2	0	0	0–4 ST	0–4 ST	—

Source: Official website

==== Pool 4 ====
Pos	Athlete	Pld	W	L	CP	TP	ARM	CUB	JPN
1	Aram Margaryan (ARM)	2	2	0	6	6	—	3–3	3–2
2	Yandro Quintana (CUB)	2	1	1	4	9	1–3 PP	—	6–0
3	Ryosuke Ota (JPN)	2	0	2	1	2	1–3 PP	0–3 PO	—

Source: Official website

==== Pool 5 ====
Pos	Athlete	Pld	W	L	CP	TP	GEO	KGZ	CHN
1	David Pogosian (GEO)	2	2	0	6	10	—	5–0	5–0
2	Suimonkul Tabaldy Uulu (KGZ)	2	1	1	3	5	0–3 PO	—	5–2
3	Fu Fangming (CHN)	2	0	2	1	2	0–3 PO	1–3 PP	—

Source: Official website

==== Pool 6 ====
Pos	Athlete	Pld	W	L	CP	TP	MGL	IND	UKR
1	Oyuunbilegiin Pürevbaatar (MGL)	2	2	0	6	8	—	3–0	5–4
2	Sushil Kumar (IND)	2	1	1	3	4	0–3 PO	—	4–2
3	Yevhen Khavilov (UKR)	2	0	2	2	6	1–3 PP	1–3 PP	—

Source: Official website

==== Pool 7 ====
Pos	Athlete	Pld	W	L	CP	TP	GER	FRA	EST
1	Daniel Wilde (GER)	2	2	0	6	12	—	4–2	8–3
2	David Leprince (FRA)	2	1	1	4	11	1–3 PP	—	9–3
3	Jaanek Lips (EST)	2	0	2	2	6	1–3 PP	1–3 PP	—

Source: Official website

==== Pool 8 ====
Pos	Athlete	Pld	W	L	CP	TP	UZB	RUS	CAN
1	Damir Zakhartdinov (UZB)	2	2	0	6	7	—	3–1	4–2
2	Prokopy Petrov (RUS)	2	1	1	4	4	1–3 PP	—	3–1
3	Saeed Azarbayjani (CAN)	2	0	2	2	3	1–3 PP	1–3 PP	—

Source: Official website

==== Pool 9 ====
Pos	Athlete	Pld	W	L	CP	TP	TUR	KAZ	PER
1	Harun Doğan (TUR)	2	2	0	7	10	—	6–3	4–0 Fall
2	Meiramzhan Beisebayev (KAZ)	2	1	1	5	15	1–3 PP	—	12–1
3	José Paico (PER)	2	0	2	1	1	0–4 TO	1–4 SP	—

Source: Official website

=== Knockout round ===
Round of 16
Mohammad Talaei (IRI)	3
Arif Abdullayev (AZE)	0

Quarterfinals
Mohammad Talaei (IRI)	4
Petru Toarcă (ROM)	3
Aram Margaryan (ARM)	4
David Pogosian (GEO)	3
Oyuunbilegiin Pürevbaatar (MGL)	3
Daniel Wilde (GER)	1
Damir Zakhartdinov (UZB)	2
Harun Doğan (TUR)	5

Semifinals
Mohammad Talaei (IRI)	3
Aram Margaryan (ARM)	4
Oyuunbilegiin Pürevbaatar (MGL)	5
Harun Doğan (TUR)	6

Final
Aram Margaryan (ARM)	2
Harun Doğan (TUR)	3
Bronze medal match
Mohammad Talaei (IRI)	2
Oyuunbilegiin Pürevbaatar (MGL)	2

- Harun Doğan of Turkey originally won the gold medal, but was disqualified after he tested positive for Ephedrine.
