= Wrestling at the 1996 Summer Olympics – Men's freestyle 57 kg =

Men's freestyle 57 kg at the Games of the XXVI Olympiad
- Venue: Georgia World Congress Center
- Dates: 30–31 July 1996
- Competitors: 21 from 21 nations

Medalists
1st place, gold medalist(s)		Kendall Cross	United States
2nd place, silver medalist(s)		Guivi Sissaouri	Canada
3rd place, bronze medalist(s)		Ri Yong-sam	North Korea

The Men's Freestyle 57 kilograms at the 1996 Summer Olympics as part of the wrestling program were held at the Georgia World Congress Center from July 30 to July 31. The gold and silver medalists were determined by the final match of the main single-elimination bracket. The losers advanced to the repechage. These matches determined the bronze medalist for the event.

== Results ==
=== Round 1 ===
	Score		CP
1/16 finals
Mohammad Talaei (IRI)	4–1	Arif Abdullayev (AZE)	3–1 PP
Damir Zakhartdinov (UZB)	5–3	Aslanbek Fidarov (UKR)	3–1 PP
Nazim Alidjanov (MDA)	8–10	Artur Fyodorov (KAZ)	1–3 PP
Tserenbaataryn Tsogtbayar (MGL)	3–8	Guivi Sissaouri (CAN)	1–3 PP
Bagavdin Umakhanov (RUS)	4–0	Michele Liuzzi (ITA)	3–0 PO
Bogdan Ciufulescu (ROM)	0–10	Sanshiro Abe (JPN)	0–4 ST
Kendall Cross (USA)	10–0	Talata Embalo (GBS)	4–0 ST
Ri Yong-sam (PRK)	3–0	Harun Doğan (TUR)	3–0 PO
Cory O'Brien (AUS)	0–10	Serafim Barzakov (BUL)	0–4 ST
Alejandro Puerto (CUB)	3–4	Šaban Trstena (MKD)	1–3 PP
Aleksandr Guzov (BLR)		Bye	

=== Round 2 ===
	Score		CP
1/8 finals
Aleksandr Guzov (BLR)	5–3	Mohammad Talaei (IRI)	3–1 PP
Damir Zakhartdinov (UZB)	3–1	Artur Fyodorov (KAZ)	3–1 PP
Guivi Sissaouri (CAN)	1–1	Bagavdin Umakhanov (RUS)	3–1 PP
Sanshiro Abe (JPN)	2–4	Kendall Cross (USA)	1–3 PP
Ri Yong-sam (PRK)	5–1	Serafim Barzakov (BUL)	3–1 PP
Šaban Trstena (MKD)		Bye	
Repechage
Arif Abdullayev (AZE)	11–0	Aslanbek Fidarov (UKR)	4–0 ST
Nazim Alidjanov (MDA)	7–6	Tserenbaataryn Tsogtbayar (MGL)	3–1 PP
Michele Liuzzi (ITA)	5–1	Bogdan Ciufulescu (ROM)	3–1 PP
Talata Embalo (GBS)	0–3 Fall	Harun Doğan (TUR)	0–4 TO
Cory O'Brien (AUS)	1–9	Alejandro Puerto (CUB)	1–3 PP

=== Round 3 ===
	Score		CP
Quarterfinals
Šaban Trstena (MKD)	7–3	Aleksandr Guzov (BLR)	3–1 PP
Damir Zakhartdinov (UZB)	0–8	Guivi Sissaouri (CAN)	0–3 PO
Kendall Cross (USA)		Bye	
Ri Yong-sam (PRK)		Bye	
Repechage
Arif Abdullayev (AZE)	4–3	Nazim Alidjanov (MDA)	3–1 PP
Michele Liuzzi (ITA)	0–4	Harun Doğan (TUR)	0–3 PO
Alejandro Puerto (CUB)	0–5	Mohammad Talaei (IRI)	0–3 PO
Artur Fyodorov (KAZ)	2–5	Bagavdin Umakhanov (RUS)	1–3 PP
Sanshiro Abe (JPN)	5–3	Serafim Barzakov (BUL)	3–1 PP

=== Round 4 ===
	Score		CP
Semifinals
Šaban Trstena (MKD)	1–4	Guivi Sissaouri (CAN)	1–3 PP
Kendall Cross (USA)	12–2	Ri Yong-sam (PRK)	4–1 SP
Repechage
Arif Abdullayev (AZE)	1–3	Harun Doğan (TUR)	1–3 PP
Mohammad Talaei (IRI)	1–0	Bagavdin Umakhanov (RUS)	3–0 PO
Sanshiro Abe (JPN)	5–6	Aleksandr Guzov (BLR)	1–3 PP
Damir Zakhartdinov (UZB)		Bye	

=== Round 5 ===
	Score		CP
Repechage
Damir Zakhartdinov (UZB)	2–4	Mohammad Talaei (IRI)	1–3 PP
Harun Doğan (TUR)	3–0	Aleksandr Guzov (BLR)	3–0 PO

=== Round 6 ===
	Score		CP
Repechage
Šaban Trstena (MKD)	2–3	Harun Doğan (TUR)	1–3 PP
Mohammad Talaei (IRI)	0–4 Fall	Ri Yong-sam (PRK)	0–4 TO

=== Finals ===
	Score		CP
Classification 7th–8th
Damir Zakhartdinov (UZB)	2–3	Aleksandr Guzov (BLR)	1–3 PP
Classification 5th–6th
Šaban Trstena (MKD)	4–3	Mohammad Talaei (IRI)	3–1 PP
Bronze medal match
Harun Doğan (TUR)	0–3	Ri Yong-sam (PRK)	0–3 PO
Gold medal match
Guivi Sissaouri (CAN)	3–5	Kendall Cross (USA)	1–3 PP

== Final standing ==
Rank	Athlete
1st place, gold medalist(s)	Kendall Cross (USA)
2nd place, silver medalist(s)	Guivi Sissaouri (CAN)
3rd place, bronze medalist(s)	Ri Yong-sam (PRK)
4	Harun Doğan (TUR)
5	Šaban Trstena (MKD)
6	Mohammad Talaei (IRI)
7	Aleksandr Guzov (BLR)
8	Damir Zakhartdinov (UZB)
9	Sanshiro Abe (JPN)
10	Arif Abdullayev (AZE)
11	Bagavdin Umakhanov (RUS)
12	Serafim Barzakov (BUL)
13	Artur Fyodorov (KAZ)
14	Nazim Alidjanov (MDA)
15	Alejandro Puerto (CUB)
16	Michele Liuzzi (ITA)
17	Tserenbaataryn Tsogtbayar (MGL)
18	Aslanbek Fidarov (UKR)
19	Cory O'Brien (AUS)
19	Bogdan Ciufulescu (ROM)
21	Talata Embalo (GBS)
