= Wrestling at the 1999 Military World Games =

- Dates: 13–16 August 1999

Wrestling at the 1999 Military World Games was held at the Peščenica Sports Hall in Zagreb, Croatia from 13 to 16 August 1999.

== Medal summary ==
=== Men's freestyle ===
Event	Gold	Silver	Bronze
54 kg	Jin Ju-dong; North Korea	Gevork Markaryan; Ukraine	Ivan Djorev; Bulgaria
58 kg	Nazim Alidjanov; Azerbaijan	Ri Yong-sam; North Korea	Murad Ramazanov; Russia
63 kg	Rovshan Hajiyev; Azerbaijan	Yevhen Buslovych; Ukraine	Miron Dzadzaev; Russia
69 kg	Artur Tavkazakhov; Russia	Sébastien Bourdin; France	Lee Young-min; South Korea
76 kg	Buvaisar Saitiev; Russia	Emzar Bedineishvili; Georgia	Elshad Allahverdiyev; Azerbaijan
85 kg	Khadzhimurad Magomedov; Russia	Athanasios Kydros; Greece	Eldar Assanov; Ukraine
97 kg	Giorgi Gogshelidze; Russia	Arawat Sabejew; Germany	Serhii Priadun; Ukraine
130 kg	Andrey Shumilin; Russia	Bayram Doğan; Turkey	Yuri Chobitko; Ukraine

=== Men's Greco-Roman ===
Event	Gold	Silver	Bronze
54 kg	Kang Yong-gyun; North Korea	Taleh Israfilov; Azerbaijan	Boris Ambartsumov; Russia
58 kg	Rustem Mambetov; Russia	Kang Kyung-il; South Korea	Roman Vashchuk; Ukraine
63 kg	Vladimir Bolshakov; Russia	Sarkis Elgkian; Greece	Tomislav Vukelić; Croatia
69 kg	Aleksey Glushkov; Russia	Sergiy Solodkyy; Ukraine	Marcel Cooper; United States
76 kg	Andrey Cherepakhin; Russia	Kim Jung-sub; South Korea	Artur Michalkiewicz; Poland
85 kg	David Millien; France	Igor Bugai; Ukraine	Seo Sang-myun; South Korea
97 kg	Aleksey Cheglakov; Russia	Konstantinos Thanos; Greece	Mindaugas Ežerskis; Lithuania
130 kg	Aleksey Kolesnikov; Russia	Josip Pavišić; Croatia	Jacek Fafiński; Poland

== Medal table ==
Rank	Nation	Gold	Silver	Bronze	Total
1	Russia	11	0	3	14
2	Azerbaijan	2	1	1	4
3	North Korea	2	1	0	3
4	France	1	1	0	2
5	Ukraine	0	4	4	8
6	Greece	0	3	0	3
7	South Korea	0	2	2	4
8	Croatia	0	1	1	2
9	Georgia	0	1	0	1
9	Germany	0	1	0	1
9	Turkey	0	1	0	1
12	Poland	0	0	2	2
13	Bulgaria	0	0	1	1
13	Lithuania	0	0	1	1
13	United States	0	0	1	1
Totals (15 entries)		16	16	16	48
