= Umakhanov =

Umakhanov is a surname. Notable people with the surname include:

- Bagavdin Umakhanov (born 1971), Russian wrestler
- Ilyas Umakhanov (born 1957), Russian politician
- Murad Umakhanov (born 1977), Russian wrestler
- Saygidpasha Umakhanov (born 1962), Russian political figure
