= Kendall Cross =

American wrestler (born 1968)

Personal information
- Full name: Kendall Duane Cross
- Born: February 24, 1968 (age 58) Hardin, Montana, U.S.
- Home town: Mustang, Oklahoma, U.S.

Sport
- Country: United States
- Sport: Wrestling
- Events: Freestyle and Folkstyle
- College team: Oklahoma State
- Club: Sunkist Kids Wrestling Club
- Team: USA
Medal record
Men's freestyle wrestling
Representing the United States
Olympic Games
Gold medal – first place	1996 Atlanta	57 kg
World Cup
Gold medal – first place	1997 Stillwater	57 kg
Pan American Championships
Bronze medal – third place	1992 Albany	57 kg
Golden Grand Prix Ivan Yarygin
Gold medal – first place	1992 Krasnoyarsk	57 kg
Junior World Championships
Bronze medal – third place	1986 Schifferstadt	56 kg
Collegiate Wrestling
Representing the Oklahoma State Cowboys
NCAA Division I Championships
Gold medal – first place	1989 Oklahoma City	126 lb
Bronze medal – third place	1990 College Park	126 lb
Big 8 Championships
Gold medal – first place	1989 Ames	126 lb
Gold medal – first place	1990 Lincoln	126 lb
Silver medal – second place	1988 Norman	126 lb

Kendall Duane Cross (born February 24, 1968) is an American freestyle wrestler, wrestling coach and Olympic gold medalist. He won the gold medal at the 1996 Summer Olympics in Atlanta, Georgia, where he wrestled in the 57 kilogram (125.5 pounds) weight class. He defeated Guivi Sissaouri of Canada 5–3 in the final match. Cross also competed at the 1992 Summer Olympics where he placed sixth. He had defeated the eventual winner and the two-time world champion Alejandro Puerto of Cuba in a previous tournament but lost 10–6 in round six of the elimination rounds.

His bracket at the 1996 Olympics is considered one of the deepest of all time, with 8 former or future World and Olympic champions competing in the event.

== Early career ==
In high school, Cross wrestled for Mustang High School in Mustang, Oklahoma where he won a state title. He wrestled collegiately for Oklahoma State University where he was a three time All-American and won the NCAA Championship in 1989. Kendall graduated from OSU with a major in political science and economics.

== Highlight achievements ==
- Distinguished Member of the National Wrestling Hall of Fame, inducted 2002
- Three time US National Champion
- Outstanding Freestyle Wrestler at the U. S. Nationals, 1992 and 1995
- 1997 USA Wrestling Athlete of the Year
- 1992 Golden Grand Prix Ivan Yarygin Tournament Champion (he defeated the strong world wrestler Bagavdin Umakhanov)
- Espoir National and Espoir World Cup Champion, 1988
- Bronze medal at Junior World Championships, 1986
- World Cup Champion, 1997
- Olympic Champion, 1996

== Coaching ==
After college he served as an assistant coach at University of North Carolina Chapel Hill in Chapel Hill, NC while training for the Olympics. He also served as a coach for the Sunkist Kids and the Dave Schultz Wrestling Clubs. Kendall went on to become an assistant coach at Harvard University and worked at Merrill Lynch in Boston. While in Boston, he founded the Kendall Cross Gold Medal Wrestling Club, which developed young athletes. Then after moving to Dallas, helped coach at Dallas Dynamite, with other Olympians Brandon Slay and Jamill Kelly. In addition to helping coach at Dallas Dynamite, he also coaches at Trinity Christian Academy.

== Family ==
Kendall has two children, Kennedy and London Cross, and currently resides in New York City.

== See also ==
- List of Oklahoma State University Olympians
