= Oyuunbilegiin Pürevbaatar =

Mongolian freestyle wrestler

Oyuunbilegiin Purevbaatar
Personal information
- Native name: Оюунбилэгийн Пүрэвбаатар
- Nationality: Mongolia
- Born: November 23, 1973 (age 52) Ulaanbaatar, Mongol Uls
- Height: 160 cm (5 ft 3 in)

Sport
- Country: Mongolia
- Sport: Wrestling
- Weight class: 60 kg
- Rank: Honored Athlete of Mongolia in freestyle wrestling
- Event: Freestyle
- Coached by: Orsoo Munkhbat

Achievements and titles
- Olympic finals: 5th(2000)
- World finals: (silver) (2001) (silver) (2002)
- Regional finals: (gold) (1997) (gold) (2002)
Medal record
Men's freestyle wrestling
Representing Mongolia
World Championships
| Silver medal – second place | 2002 Tehran | 60 kg |
| Silver medal – second place | 2001 Sofia | 58 kg |
World Cup
| Bronze medal – third place | 2002 Spokane | 60 kg |
Asian Games
| Gold medal – first place | 2002 Busan | 60 kg |
| Silver medal – second place | 1998 Bangkok | 58 kg |
Asian Championships
| Gold medal – first place | 1997 Tehran | 58 kg |
East Asian Games
| Gold medal – first place | 1997 Busan | 58 kg |
Olympic Qualification Tournament
| Gold medal – first place | 2000 Minsk | 58 kg |
Golden Grand Prix Ivan Yarygin
| Gold medal – first place | 1999 Krasnoyarsk | 58 kg |
| Silver medal – second place | 2002 Krasnoyarsk | 60 kg |
| Silver medal – second place | 2000 Krasnoyarsk | 58 kg |
| Bronze medal – third place | 1994 Krasnoyarsk | 52 kg |
Yasar Dogu Tournament
| Silver medal – second place | 1998 Ankara | 58 kg |

Oyuunbilegiin Pürevbaatar (Mongolian: Оюунбилэгийн Пүрэвбаатар; born 23 November 1973) is a Mongolian former wrestler who competed in the 2000 Summer Olympics and in the 2004 Summer Olympics.

== Freestyle career ==
At the 1997 Asian Championships which was held 12–18 April in Tehran, Iran, Pürevbaatar won the tournament in the men's freestyle 58 kg, including the match against the World Champion Mohammad Talaei who had beaten the 1996 Olympic medalist and reigning Asian Champion Ri Yong-sam.

At the 2000 Olympic Qualification Tournament which was held 29 January in Minsk, Belarus, Pürevbaatar won the gold medal in the men's freestyle 58 kg, by defeating Arif Abdullayev in the final.

At the 2000 Olympics Pürevbaatar originally earned 5-tn place in the men's freestyle 58 kg. He defeated Cory O'Brien 9–0, Aleksandr Guzov 6–1, lost to Alireza Dabir 2–5, and beat David Pogosian by 6–0. Pürevbaatar was disqualified after he tested positive for Furosemide.

At the 2001 World Championships which was held 22–25 November in Sofia, Bulgaria, Pürevbaatar won the silver medal in the men's freestyle 58 kg. He defeated the strong wrestlers such as the World University Championships Winner and European Championships medalist Aliaksandr Karnitski 4–0, two-time European Champion and World Championships medalist David Pogosian 5–1, reigning two-time Pan American and future Olympic Champion Yandro Quintana 6-2 of the elimination rounds. In the final round, it comes to him against the 1996 Olympic medalist Guivi Sissaouri from Canada. Wrestlers could not determine the winner in regular time of the match with a score 2-2, Sissaouri was briefly pinned with his back to the mat, also he fell because of a successful single leg takedown by Pürevbaatar. During the overtime, the Canadian scored a 3-point takedown to grab a 5–2 victory.

At the 2002 World Cup which was held 06–7 April in Spokane, USA, Pürevbaatar held the bronze medal in the men's freestyle 60 kg after beating the Olympic medalist and reigning World Champion Guivi Sissaouri 4–0, though Sissaouri claimed this World Cup thanks to solid victories in the rest of the matches

At the 2002 World Championships which was held 6–7 September in Tehran, Iran, Pürevbaatar originally won the bronze medal in the men's freestyle 60 kg. At the semifinals, he lost to Harun Doğan 5–6. Nevertheless, Pürevbaatar has a chance of winning the medal though it's not gold or silver. Mongolian wrestler won the Bronze Medal match against the former World Champion Mohammad Talaei 2-2. However, the 2002 World Championships gold medallist Harun Doğan was disqualified after he tested positive for the banned substance ephedrine, therefore, Pürevbaatar upgraded to silver medallist of the 2002 World Championships.

At the 2002 Asian Games which was held 7–8 October in Busan, South Korea, Pürevbaatar won the gold medal in the men's freestyle 60 kg, by defeating Song Jae-myung 6–1 in the final.

At the 2004 Olympics Pürevbaatar earned 13-th place in the men's freestyle 60 kg. He lost to David Pogosian 2–4, but beat the 2003 World Cup and reigning four-time U.S. Open Champion Eric Guerrero 3–1.

At the 2005 World Championships which was held 26 September – 2 October in Budapest, Hungary, Pürevbaatar earned 5-th place in the men's freestyle 60 kg. He won 3 rounds, including the match against the European and Russian National Champion Murad Ramazanov with a score of 6–3, and lost 2 rounds. Shortly after this tournament, Pürevbaatar retired from competitive wrestling to turn his focus on coaching.
