= 2001 Yasar Dogu Tournament =

Yasar Dogu 2001
- Host city: Ankara, Turkey
- Dates: 2–3 March 2001
- Stadium: Ataturk Sports Complex

The Yasar Dogu Tournament 2001, was a wrestling event held in Ankara, Turkey between 2 and 3 March 2001. This tournament was held as 29th.

This international tournament includes competition includes competition in men's freestyle wrestling. This ranking tournament was held in honor of the two time Olympic Champion, Yaşar Doğu.

== Medal table ==
Rank	Nation	Gold	Silver	Bronze	Total
1	Turkey	5	5	3	13
2	Mongolia	2	1	0	3
3	United States	1	1	1	3
4	Romania	0	1	1	2
5	Slovakia	0	0	2	2
6	Bulgaria	0	0	1	1
Totals (6 entries)		8	8	8	24

== Medal overview ==
=== Men's freestyle ===
Event	Gold	Silver	Bronze
54 kg	Samuel Henson; United States	Vedat Öztemur; Turkey	Mevlana Kulaç; Turkey
58 kg	Tevfik Odabaşı; Turkey	Kerry Bonskuis; United States	Andrej Fašánek; Slovakia
63 kg	Bayarmagnaj Norjin; Mongolia	Levent Kaleli; Turkey	Vladimir Chamula; Slovakia
69 kg	Ahmet Gülhan; Turkey	Boldsukh Adiyahuu; Mongolia	İvan Todorov; Bulgaria
76 kg	Gökhan Yavaşer; Turkey	Adem Bereket; Turkey	Eugen Preda; Romania
85 kg	Ali Özen; Turkey	Razvan Pircalabu; Romania	Aaron Simpson; United States
97 kg	Vedat Ergin; Turkey	Kaşif Şakiroğlu; Turkey	Taşkın Özkale; Turkey
125 kg	Usukhbayar Gelegjamts; Mongolia	Savaş Yıldırım; Turkey	Tolga Topçu; Turkey

== Participating nations ==
- Bulgaria
- Kazakhstan
- Macedonia
- Mongolia
- Romania
- Slovakia
- Turkey
- United States
