= Nazim Alidjanov =

Moldovan wrestler (born 1970)

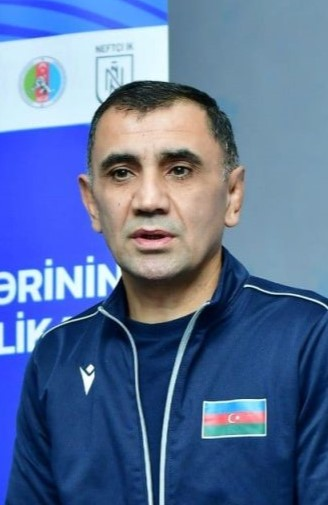

Personal information
- Nationality: Azerbaijani
- Born: 26 July 1970 (age 55) Qakh, Azerbaijan SSR, Soviet Union

Sport
- Sport: Wrestling
Medal record
Men's freestyle wrestling
Representing Azerbaijan
European Championships
Gold medal – first place	2002 Baku	55 kg
World Military Championships
Gold medal – first place	1999 Zagreb	58 kg

Nazim Alidjanov (born 26 July 1970) is an Azerbaijani wrestler. He competed in the men's freestyle 57 kg at the 1996 Summer Olympics.
