= Aram Margaryan =

Armenian freestyle wrestler

Personal information
- Born: 27 March 1974 (age 52) Yerevan, Armenian SSR, Soviet Union
- Height: 1.64 m (5 ft 4 1/2 in)
- Weight: 66 kg (146 lb)

Sport
- Sport: Wrestling
- Weight class: 60 kg
- Event: Freestyle
- Club: Malatia Yerevan
- Coached by: Andranik Aroyan; Norayr Serobyan
Medal record
Men's freestyle wrestling
Representing Armenia
World Championships
Gold medal – first place	2002 Tehran	60 kg
Espoir European Championships
Gold medal – first place	1994 Kourtane	57 kg
Representing Soviet Union
Junior European Championships
Bronze medal – third place	1991 Istanbul	58 kg

Aram Margaryan (Armenian: Արամ Մարգարյան, born 27 March 1974) is a retired Armenian Freestyle wrestler. He is a World Champion, winning the gold medal in 2002. Margaryan was awarded the Honored Master of Sports of Armenia title in 2009.

== Biography ==
Aram Margaryan was born on 27 March 1974 in Yerevan, Soviet Armenia. He began freestyle wrestling under Andranik Aroyan and Norayr Serobian. Margaryan was included in the USSR junior freestyle wrestling team in 1991. After the collapse of the Soviet Union, Margaryan stood under the flag of his native Armenia. He soon joined the Armenian espoir freestyle wrestling team in 1992. Margaryan became an Espoir European Champion in 1994. At the age of 21, Margaryan became a member of the Armenian national freestyle wrestling team.

Margaryan won a gold medal at the 2002 World Wrestling Championships in Tehran. This was the greatest success of his career. He was named Sportsman of the Year by Armenian sports reporters for his performance. Margaryan is only the second World Wrestling Champion in freestyle wrestling from the independent Republic of Armenia, after Arayik Gevorgyan.

In 2003, Aram Margaryan ended his wrestling career and began working as a coach. For several years he was the head coach of the Armenian junior and senior freestyle wrestling teams. He was succeeded by Avetik Vardanyan. Margaryan later worked at the Yerevan Olympic sports college. On 5 October 2010, the college was visited by National Olympic Committee of Armenia President Gagik Tsarukyan, who praised the work of the college teaching staff. For the significant contribution to the development of physical culture and sports, Tsarukyan awarded Margaryan the Hrant Shahinyan Medal of the National Olympic Committee of Armenia.
