= Wrestling at the 1998 Asian Games – Men's freestyle 58 kg =

Men's freestyle 58 kg at the 1998 Asian Games
- Venue: Thammasat Gymnasium 1
- Dates: 17–18 December 1998
- Competitors: 11 from 11 nations

Medalists
gold medal	Ri Yong-sam	North Korea
silver medal	Oyuunbilegiin Pürevbaatar	Mongolia
bronze medal	Mohammad Talaei	Iran

The men's freestyle 58 kilograms wrestling competition at the 1998 Asian Games in Bangkok was held on 17 December and 18 December at the Thammasat Gymnasium 1.

The gold and silver medalists were determined by the final match of the main single-elimination bracket. The losers advanced to the repechage. These matches determined the bronze medalist for the event.

== Schedule ==
All times are Indochina Time (UTC+07:00)

Date	Time	Event
Thursday, 17 December 1998	09:00	Round 1
Thursday, 17 December 1998	16:00	Round 2
Friday, 18 December 1998	09:00	Round 3
Friday, 18 December 1998	09:00	Round 4
Friday, 18 December 1998	16:00	Round 5
Friday, 18 December 1998	16:00	Finals

== Results ==
=== Round 1 ===
	Score		CP
1/8 finals
Trần Anh Tuấn (VIE)	0–12	Oyuunbilegiin Pürevbaatar (MGL)	0–4 ST
Mohammad Talaei (IRI)	8–0	Maksat Boburbekov (KGZ)	3–0 PO
Murat Mambetov (KAZ)	10–0	Madan Yadav (NEP)	4–0 ST
Ri Yong-sam (PRK)	3–0	Jung Jin-hyuk (KOR)	3–0 PO
Mais Ibadov (UZB)	13–4	Yuji Ishijima (JPN)	3–1 PP
Suriyen Sorosok (THA)		Bye	

=== Round 2 ===
	Score		CP
Quarterfinals
Suriyen Sorosok (THA)	0–10	Oyuunbilegiin Pürevbaatar (MGL)	0–4 ST
Mohammad Talaei (IRI)	2–3	Murat Mambetov (KAZ)	1–3 PP
Ri Yong-sam (PRK)		Bye	
Mais Ibadov (UZB)		Bye	
Repechage
Trần Anh Tuấn (VIE)	0–8 Fall	Maksat Boburbekov (KGZ)	0–4 TO
Madan Yadav (NEP)	0–11	Jung Jin-hyuk (KOR)	0–4 ST
Yuji Ishijima (JPN)		Bye	

=== Round 3 ===
	Score		CP
Semifinals
Oyuunbilegiin Pürevbaatar (MGL)	13–2	Murat Mambetov (KAZ)	4–1 SP
Ri Yong-sam (PRK)	10–0	Mais Ibadov (UZB)	4–0 ST
Repechage
Yuji Ishijima (JPN)	2–3	Maksat Boburbekov (KGZ)	1–3 PP
Jung Jin-hyuk (KOR)	10–0	Suriyen Sorosok (THA)	4–0 ST
Mohammad Talaei (IRI)		Bye	

=== Round 4 ===
	Score		CP
Repechage
Mohammad Talaei (IRI)	3–2	Jung Jin-hyuk (KOR)	3–1 PP
Maksat Boburbekov (KGZ)		Bye	

=== Round 5 ===
	Score		CP
Repechage
Murat Mambetov (KAZ)	5–0	Maksat Boburbekov (KGZ)	3–0 PO
Mohammad Talaei (IRI)	9–0	Mais Ibadov (UZB)	3–0 PO

=== Finals ===
	Score		CP
Bronze medal match
Murat Mambetov (KAZ)	2–5	Mohammad Talaei (IRI)	1–3 PP
Gold medal match
Oyuunbilegiin Pürevbaatar (MGL)	1–4	Ri Yong-sam (PRK)	1–3 PP

== Final standing ==
Rank	Athlete
1st place, gold medalist(s)	Ri Yong-sam (PRK)
2nd place, silver medalist(s)	Oyuunbilegiin Pürevbaatar (MGL)
3rd place, bronze medalist(s)	Mohammad Talaei (IRI)
4	Murat Mambetov (KAZ)
5	Maksat Boburbekov (KGZ)
6	Mais Ibadov (UZB)
7	Jung Jin-hyuk (KOR)
8	Yuji Ishijima (JPN)
9	Suriyen Sorosok (THA)
10	Madan Yadav (NEP)
10	Trần Anh Tuấn (VIE)
