= Wrestling at the 1995 Military World Games =

- Dates: 10–14 September 1995

Wrestling at the 1995 Military World Games was held in Rome, Italy from 10 to 14 September 1995.

== Medal summary ==
=== Men's freestyle ===
Event	Gold	Silver	Bronze
48 kg	Vugar Orujov; Russia	Kim Soon-nam; North Korea	Armen Mkrtchyan; Armenia
52 kg	Jin Ju-dong; North Korea	Namig Abdullayev; Azerbaijan	Saeid Kolivand; Iran
57 kg	Ri Yong-sam; North Korea	Sezgin Selimoğlu; Turkey	Vyacheslav Senek; Russia
62 kg	Mikhail Chernov; Ukraine	Zelimkhan Akhmedov; Russia	Jürgen Scheibe; Germany
68 kg	Ali Akbarnejad; Iran	Hwang Sang-ho; South Korea	Vadim Bogiev; Russia
74 kg	Sagid Katinovasov; Russia	Abolfazl Zeinalnia; Iran	Kamil Kocaoğlu; Turkey
82 kg	Stanislav Albegov; Russia	Alireza Heidari; Iran	Eldar Assanov; Ukraine
90 kg	Abdolreza Kargar; Iran	Renato Lombardo; Italy	Yuri Korliouk; Ukraine
100 kg	Savaş Yıldırım; Turkey	Gelegjamtsyn Ösökhbayar; Mongolia	David Musulbes; Russia
130 kg	Zekeriya Güçlü; Turkey	Yuri Chobitko; Ukraine	Andrey Shumilin; Russia

=== Men's Greco-Roman ===
Event	Gold	Silver	Bronze
48 kg	Kang Yong-gyun; North Korea	Viacheslav Sergienko; Ukraine	Sergey Girakosian; Russia
52 kg	Oleg Nemchenko; Russia	Bobby Demeritt; United States	Behrouz Heidarzadeh; Iran
57 kg	Armen Nazaryan; Armenia	Pak Chol-nam; North Korea	Lee Tae-gil; South Korea
62 kg	Mehmet Akif Pirim; Turkey	Włodzimierz Zawadzki; Poland	Pavel Sharov; Russia
68 kg	Aleksandr Tretyakov; Russia	Rodney Smith; United States	Adam Juretzko; Germany
74 kg	Erol Koyuncu; Turkey	Asker Tatlok; Russia	Erik Hahn; Germany
82 kg	Murat Kardanov; Russia	Alexandr Vetchanin; Ukraine	Olrik Meißner; Germany
90 kg	Petru Sudureac; Romania	Salvatore Campanella; Italy	Jacek Fafiński; Poland
100 kg	Maik Bullmann; Germany	Anatoli Kozulia; Ukraine	Giuseppe Giunta; Italy
130 kg	Şaban Donat; Turkey	Aleksey Kolesnikov; Russia	Georgiy Saldadze; Ukraine

== Medal table ==
Rank	Nation	Gold	Silver	Bronze	Total
1	Russia	6	3	6	15
2	Turkey	5	1	1	7
3	North Korea	3	2	0	5
4	Iran	2	2	2	6
5	Ukraine	1	4	3	8
6	Germany	1	0	4	5
7	Armenia	1	0	1	2
8	Romania	1	0	0	1
9	Italy	0	2	1	3
10	United States	0	2	0	2
11	Poland	0	1	1	2
11	South Korea	0	1	1	2
13	Azerbaijan	0	1	0	1
13	Mongolia	0	1	0	1
Totals (14 entries)		20	20	20	60
