= Artur Fyodorov =

Kazakh wrestler

Personal information
- Nationality: Kazakhstani
- Born: 3 January 1971 (age 55)

Sport
- Sport: Wrestling

Artur Fyodorov (Артур Дмитриевич Федоров, born 3 January 1971) is a Kazakh wrestler. He competed in the men's freestyle 57 kg at the 1996 Summer Olympics.
