= Aslanbek Fidarov =

Ukrainian wrestler (1973–2020)

Personal information
- Nationality: Ukrainian
- Born: 4 May 1973 Ordzhonikidze, Russian SFSR, Soviet Union
- Died: 8 December 2020 (aged 47) Vladikavkaz, Russia

Sport
- Sport: Wrestling
Medal record
Men's wrestling
Representing Ukraine
European Championships
Gold medal – first place	1995 Fribourg	57 kg
Bronze medal – third place	1994 Rome	57 kg

Aslanbek Fidarov (4 May 1973 – 8 December 2020) was a Ukrainian wrestler. He competed in the men's freestyle 57 kg at the 1996 Summer Olympics. Fidarov died from COVID-19 during the pandemic in Russia.
