= 2019 Veterans World Wrestling Championships =

- Location: (Georgia (country)) Georgia, Tbilisi
- Dates: October 08–13, 2019

The 2019 Veterans World Wrestling Championships was held from 8 to 13 October 2019 in Tbilisi, Georgia.

The competition was held in the following age categories:

- Division " A " 35 – 40 years
- Division " B " 41 – 45 years
- Division " C " 46 – 50 years
- Division " D " 51 – 55 years
- Division " E " 56 – 60 years

The weight categories are as follows:

- 55 – 62 kg
- 70 kg
- 78 kg
- 88 kg
- 100 kg
- 100 – 130 kg

== History ==
Games was started in 1992. Previous Masters World Championships were:

1. Cali, Colombia (1992)
2. Toronto, Canada (1993)
3. Rome, Italy, (1994)
4. Sofia, Bulgaria (1995)
5. Varna, Bulgaria (1996)
6. Martigny, Switzerland (1997)

https://cms.uww.org/about-uww/history-wrestling-uww

https://uww.org/sites/default/files/media/document/regulations_veterans.pdf

https://nwhof.org/national-wrestling-hall-of-fame/women-s-wrestling-experience

== Medal table ==
* Host nation (Georgia)

Rank	Nation	Gold	Silver	Bronze	Total
1	Iran	20	10	11	41
2	Japan	5	0	0	5
3	Georgia*	4	5	10	19
4	Germany	4	4	4	12
5	Kazakhstan	3	4	9	16
6	Turkey	3	2	5	10
7	Armenia	3	1	3	7
8	Russia	2	7	10	19
9	Hungary	2	3	2	7
10	Sweden	2	2	6	10
11	Mongolia	2	1	6	9
12	Italy	2	1	0	3
13	Moldova	2	0	0	2
14	United States	1	6	15	22
15	Ukraine	1	4	1	6
16	Kyrgyzstan	1	3	2	6
17	Poland	1	2	4	7
18	Romania	1	1	1	3
19	Belarus	1	0	0	1
20	Azerbaijan	0	2	1	3
21	France	0	1	1	2
22	Estonia	0	1	0	1
23	Finland	0	0	3	3
23	India	0	0	3	3
25	Bulgaria	0	0	2	2
25	Czech Republic	0	0	2	2
27	Austria	0	0	1	1
27	Israel	0	0	1	1
27	Morocco	0	0	1	1
27	Spain	0	0	1	1
Totals (30 entries)		60	60	105	225

== Men's freestyle ==
=== Veterans A ===
Event	Gold	Silver	Bronze
62 kg	Kenta Fujimoto; Japan	Murad Shuebov; Russia	Nicholas Robert Hull; United States
62 kg	Kenta Fujimoto; Japan	Murad Shuebov; Russia	Dmitriy Perevozchikov; Russia
70 kg	Masanori Sakamoto; Japan	Mohsen Keyvan Sameti; Iran	Jordin Humphrey; United States
70 kg	Masanori Sakamoto; Japan	Mohsen Keyvan Sameti; Iran	Gralan Early Jr. United States
78 kg	Abdulhamit Altun; Turkey	Alireza Hassani; Iran	Tserenbaatar Ganzorig; Mongolia
78 kg	Abdulhamit Altun; Turkey	Alireza Hassani; Iran	Mohinder Singh; India
88 kg	Gábor Hatos; Hungary	James Medeiros II; United States	Zabihollah Aghjehroud; Iran
88 kg	Gábor Hatos; Hungary	James Medeiros II; United States	Magomedmirza Taurovski; Germany
100 kg	Ali Mehmet İmamoğlu; Turkey	Shahab Tayeb Moeinifar; Iran	Sebastian Woliński; Poland
100 kg	Ali Mehmet İmamoğlu; Turkey	Shahab Tayeb Moeinifar; Iran	Gadzhimurad Taymazov; Russia
130 kg	Shabanali Ramezan Cherati; Iran	Alexander Salamov; Russia	Konstantin Bozhkov; Russia

=== Veterans B ===
Event	Gold	Silver	Bronze
62 kg	Abdolreza Jonyeh Rastekar; Iran	Jaanek Lips; Estonia	Aluda Silagadze; Georgia
62 kg	Abdolreza Jonyeh Rastekar; Iran	Jaanek Lips; Estonia	Khurts Janchiv; Mongolia
70 kg	Katsuyoshi Ito; Japan	Serhii Ratushniak; Ukraine	William Anderson; United States
70 kg	Katsuyoshi Ito; Japan	Serhii Ratushniak; Ukraine	Kripa Shankar Patel; India
78 kg	Davood Ghafar Gholipoor; Iran	Bilimbek Kaparbek Uulu; Kyrgyzstan	Baildagch Bayansan; Mongolia
78 kg	Davood Ghafar Gholipoor; Iran	Bilimbek Kaparbek Uulu; Kyrgyzstan	Vakhtang Nariashvili; Georgia
88 kg	Mohammad Mahmoud Zarrinkamar; Iran	Aliakbar Hasani; Iran	Ganbat Dorjgotov; Mongolia
88 kg	Mohammad Mahmoud Zarrinkamar; Iran	Aliakbar Hasani; Iran	Malkhaz Jorbenadze; Georgia
100 kg	Ebrahim Tavakoli; Iran	Joshua Nacey; United States	Yuliyan Georgiev; Bulgaria
100 kg	Ebrahim Tavakoli; Iran	Joshua Nacey; United States	Ali Darakhshanifara; Finland
130 kg	Ali Davoud Darzinezhadrami; Iran	Aydın Halimoğlu; Turkey	Joseph Thomas Bellavia; United States

=== Veterans C ===
Event	Gold	Silver	Bronze
62 kg	Thomas Berger; Germany	Jahangir Mastali Shaker; Iran	Baatarsuren Gendendorj; Mongolia
62 kg	Thomas Berger; Germany	Jahangir Mastali Shaker; Iran	Gocha Kirkitadze; Georgia
70 kg	Baatar Nyamjav; Mongolia	Zhumazhan Yelgeldin; Kazakhstan	Stefan Pentschew; Germany
70 kg	Baatar Nyamjav; Mongolia	Zhumazhan Yelgeldin; Kazakhstan	Antonino Calandra; Italy
78 kg	Levon Asatryan; Armenia	Jambuli Sanakoshvili; Georgia	Artur Martoyan; Armenia
78 kg	Levon Asatryan; Armenia	Jambuli Sanakoshvili; Georgia	Mohammad Ahmadi Afshar; Spain
88 kg	Salim Lesani; Iran	Ali Sabour; Iran	Tomas Tobola; Czech Republic
88 kg	Salim Lesani; Iran	Ali Sabour; Iran	Seyedhossein Sadati; Iran
100 kg	Abbas Chehreh; Iran	Chynarbek Izabekov; Kyrgyzstan	Sohrab Rahmatabadi; Iran
100 kg	Abbas Chehreh; Iran	Chynarbek Izabekov; Kyrgyzstan	Nshan Khudanyan; Armenia
130 kg	Eldar Kurtanidze; Georgia	Bayanmunkh Shura; Mongolia	Reza Rahmanee; Iran
130 kg	Eldar Kurtanidze; Georgia	Bayanmunkh Shura; Mongolia	George Porter; United States

=== Veterans D ===
Event	Gold	Silver	Bronze
62 kg	Arkady Ilimetov; Ukraine	Winfried Hoeflich; Germany	Baiar Ochirov; Russia
62 kg	Arkady Ilimetov; Ukraine	Winfried Hoeflich; Germany	Joseph Raia; United States
70 kg	Hamidreza Kenari; Iran	Stephen Horton; United States	Shamil Magomedov; Russia
70 kg	Hamidreza Kenari; Iran	Stephen Horton; United States	Niyamudin Murtazaev; Russia
78 kg	Mohammadkazem Kenari; Iran	Jonathan Molfino; Italy	Rasoul Atashi; Iran
78 kg	Mohammadkazem Kenari; Iran	Jonathan Molfino; Italy	Dirk Stastny; Germany
88 kg	Sipeki Karoly; Hungary	Radislav Navazhap; Russia	Jeffrey Anderson; United States
88 kg	Sipeki Karoly; Hungary	Radislav Navazhap; Russia	Matvei Iliukhinov; Russia
100 kg	Hossein Helali; Iran	Yousef Torabi; Iran	Idris Iasulov; Russia
100 kg	Hossein Helali; Iran	Yousef Torabi; Iran	Abdurashid Bagavdinov; Russia
130 kg	Bumbayar Damiran; Mongolia	Thomas Dybiona; Germany	Matthew Nowak; United States

=== Veterans E ===
Event	Gold	Silver	Bronze
62 kg	Boris Savva; Moldova	Zhora Hovhannisyan; Armenia	Kassenkhan Sergaziyev; Kazakhstan
62 kg	Boris Savva; Moldova	Zhora Hovhannisyan; Armenia	Jeffrey Dwayne Mallett; United States
70 kg	Satoru Goitsuka; Japan	Valeri Kupatadze; Georgia	Serik Sergazin; Kazakhstan
70 kg	Satoru Goitsuka; Japan	Valeri Kupatadze; Georgia	Bondo Sardanashvili; Georgia
78 kg	Melis Turganbaev; Kyrgyzstan	Bradley Swartz; United States	Turpalali Sulimanov; Kazakhstan
78 kg	Melis Turganbaev; Kyrgyzstan	Bradley Swartz; United States	Ömer Ersöz; Turkey
88 kg	Hidemitsu Yugawa; Japan	Wilhelm Schroeder; Germany	Buyandelger Bat; Mongolia
88 kg	Hidemitsu Yugawa; Japan	Wilhelm Schroeder; Germany	Malkhaz Rozomashvili; Georgia
100 kg	Harri Schuhmacher; Germany	Masoud Mirhashemi; Iran	Erol Yıldırım; Turkey
100 kg	Harri Schuhmacher; Germany	Masoud Mirhashemi; Iran	Davoud Baninosrat; Iran
130 kg	Daniel Chaid; United States	Attila Szabo; Romania	Abdulla Zabakov; Kazakhstan

== Men's Greco-Roman ==
=== Veterans A ===
Event	Gold	Silver	Bronze
62 kg	Hassan Khodabandehlou; Iran	Ahmad Olia; Iran	Jarkko Wester; Sweden
70 kg	Amir Foroudi; Iran	Mamuka Khemshiashvili; Georgia	Kanat Shabdanbaev; Kyrgyzstan
70 kg	Amir Foroudi; Iran	Mamuka Khemshiashvili; Georgia	Irakli Chochua; Georgia
78 kg	Dumitru Popov; Moldova	Viktor Syniavskyi; Ukraine	Aleksandre Tabatadze; Georgia
78 kg	Dumitru Popov; Moldova	Viktor Syniavskyi; Ukraine	Eduard Durmanov; Kazakhstan
88 kg	Morteza Ali Heidarigoujani; Iran	Temirlan Abishev; Kazakhstan	James Medeiros; United States
88 kg	Morteza Ali Heidarigoujani; Iran	Temirlan Abishev; Kazakhstan	Robin Liljegren; Sweden
100 kg	Omid Mosavi; Sweden	Damian Fedorowicz; Poland	Mohammad Khoshnoudi; Iran
100 kg	Omid Mosavi; Sweden	Damian Fedorowicz; Poland	Vasili Gogaladze; Georgia
130 kg	Alireza Rahim Akbari; Iran	Leif Eddy Bengtsson; Sweden	Not Awarded

=== Veterans B ===
Event	Gold	Silver	Bronze
62 kg	Aleksandr Serebrinnikov; Russia	Ivan Vlasiuk; Ukraine	Ersin Başar; Turkey
62 kg	Aleksandr Serebrinnikov; Russia	Ivan Vlasiuk; Ukraine	Zhanbolat Abitov; Kazakhstan
70 kg	Azad Alimohammadpour; Iran	Aleksei Arhangelskii; Russia	Tazabek Ikramov; Kyrgyzstan
70 kg	Azad Alimohammadpour; Iran	Aleksei Arhangelskii; Russia	Moshe Grimberg; Israel
78 kg	Jimmy Samuelsson; Sweden	Mammad Aliyev; Azerbaijan	Farzad Alkasir; Iran
78 kg	Jimmy Samuelsson; Sweden	Mammad Aliyev; Azerbaijan	Jani Syrjänen; Finland
88 kg	Levon Geghamyan; Armenia	Shmagi Gokadze; Georgia	Stanislaw Mierniczek; Poland
88 kg	Levon Geghamyan; Armenia	Shmagi Gokadze; Georgia	Behzad Nourollah Abdolvand; Iran
100 kg	Zurab Tsiskaridze; Georgia	Aleksandr Sergeevich Arkhangelskii; Russia	Mario Fruehwirth; Austria
100 kg	Zurab Tsiskaridze; Georgia	Aleksandr Sergeevich Arkhangelskii; Russia	Yuliyan Dimitrov Georgiev; Bulgaria
130 kg	Reza Tabrizi; Iran	Musa Mirzayev; Azerbaijan	Rafał Koszowski; Poland
130 kg	Reza Tabrizi; Iran	Musa Mirzayev; Azerbaijan	Gyula Papp; Hungary

=== Veterans C ===
Event	Gold	Silver	Bronze
62 kg	Artak Vardanyan; Armenia	Thomas Berger; Germany	Farokh Morteza Hodaei; Iran
62 kg	Artak Vardanyan; Armenia	Thomas Berger; Germany	Robinson Prebish; United States
70 kg	Akaki Chachua; Georgia	Nariman Kairmanov; Kazakhstan	Abdelhafid Benomari; France
70 kg	Akaki Chachua; Georgia	Nariman Kairmanov; Kazakhstan	Aramayis Poghosyan; Armenia
78 kg	Sergey Russin; Kazakhstan	Johan Mikael Hedberg; Sweden	Ercan Ayyıldız; Turkey
78 kg	Sergey Russin; Kazakhstan	Johan Mikael Hedberg; Sweden	Stanislav Zvarych; Ukraine
88 kg	Amiran Svanidze; Georgia	Jerzy Sekura; Poland	Tomas Tobola; Czech Republic
88 kg	Amiran Svanidze; Georgia	Jerzy Sekura; Poland	Kairat Borumbayev; Kazakhstan
100 kg	Alireza Moghaddam; Iran	David Kuprashvili; Georgia	Randhir Singh; India
130 kg	Bahaaldin Karimzadeh; Iran	George Porter; United States	Adil Karibov; Kazakhstan

=== Veterans D ===
Event	Gold	Silver	Bronze
62 kg	Winfried Hoeflich; Germany	Joseph Raia; United States	Gholam Ali Jalali; Iran
62 kg	Winfried Hoeflich; Germany	Joseph Raia; United States	Malkhaz Gogoladze; Georgia
70 kg	Domenico Piccinini; Italy	Frédéric Michel Paul; France	Michael Lee Madry; United States
70 kg	Domenico Piccinini; Italy	Frédéric Michel Paul; France	Lars Mikael Dahl; Sweden
78 kg	Jonathan Molfino; Italy	Igor Dokuchaev; Russia	Anders Sjoeqvist; Sweden
78 kg	Jonathan Molfino; Italy	Igor Dokuchaev; Russia	Ömer Topal; Turkey
88 kg	Pavel Denisov; Russia	Karoly Sipeki; Hungary	Janusz Wisniewski; Poland
88 kg	Pavel Denisov; Russia	Karoly Sipeki; Hungary	Gert Ove Pettersson; Sweden
100 kg	Jahangir Nejad; Iran	Aleksandr Kokurin; Russia	Erik Hinckley; United States
130 kg	Andrzej Wroński; Poland	Istvan Bela Dezsereczky; Hungary	Matthew Nowak; United States

=== Veterans E ===
Event	Gold	Silver	Bronze
62 kg	Kassenkhan Sergaziyev; Kazakhstan	Mehmet Kenan Bektaş; Turkey	Vladimir Golovanov; Kazakhstan
62 kg	Kassenkhan Sergaziyev; Kazakhstan	Mehmet Kenan Bektaş; Turkey	Abdelillah Azdine; Morocco
70 kg	Nurakhan Utepbergenov; Kazakhstan	Gyula Buchholcz; Hungary	Not Awarded
78 kg	Kanstantsin Kemau; Belarus	Soslan Adyrkhaiev; Ukraine	Gheorghe Paduraru; Romania
78 kg	Kanstantsin Kemau; Belarus	Soslan Adyrkhaiev; Ukraine	Hormoz Almasi; Iran
88 kg	Wilhelm Schroede; Germany	Berdikul Karaev; Kyrgyzstan	Károly Szeitl; Hungary
88 kg	Wilhelm Schroede; Germany	Berdikul Karaev; Kyrgyzstan	Ari Markkola; Sweden
100 kg	Halil İbrahim Yağcı; Turkey	Ali Mandehgar Kohandel; Iran	Toni Hannula; Finland
100 kg	Halil İbrahim Yağcı; Turkey	Ali Mandehgar Kohandel; Iran	Bernd Holzapfel; Germany
130 kg	Attila Szabo; Romania	Abdulla Zabakov; Kazakhstan	Rovshan Ismayilkhanli; Azerbaijan
