= Mohammad Talaei =

Iranian wrestler

Medal record

Men's freestyle wrestling

Representing Iran

World Championships
Gold medal – first place	1997 Krasnoyarsk	58 kg
Silver medal – second place	1994 Istanbul	57 kg
Bronze medal – third place	2002 Tehran	60 kg

Asian Games
Bronze medal – third place	1998 Bangkok	58 kg

Asian Championships
Bronze medal – third place	1996 Xiaoshan	57 kg
Bronze medal – third place	1997 Tehran	58 kg

Golden Grand Prix Ivan Yarygin
Gold medal – first place	2000 Krasnoyarsk	63 kg

Mohammad Talaei (Persian: محمد طلایی, born April 7, 1973, in Isfahan) is an Iranian retired wrestler. Mohammad Talaei participated in the men's freestyle 57 kg at 1996 Summer Olympics. He earned 6-th place after losing to Shaban Trstena, however, Mohammad Talaei consecutively beat reigning Olympic and two-time World Champion Alejandro Puerto (5–0), multiple European and World Cup Champion Bagavdin Umakhanov (1-0) in the elimination rounds. He also competed at the 2000 Summer Olympics.

== Personal life ==
On 7 January 2026, Talaei publicly supported the 2025–2026 Iranian protests on his Instagram, stating: "Do not confiscate my personal opinions, I am among the people and from the people."
