= Chvitsa Polychronidis =

Greek wrestler

Personal information
- Nationality: Greek
- Born: 17 February 1971 (age 55)

Sport
- Sport: Wrestling

Chvitsa Polychronidis (born 17 February 1971) is a Greek wrestler. He competed in the men's freestyle 58 kg at the 2000 Summer Olympics.
