= Bogdan Ciufulescu =

Romanian wrestler

Bogdan Ciufulescu (born 1 April 1970) is a Romanian former wrestler who competed in the 1996 Summer Olympics.
