= Octavian Cuciuc =

Moldovan wrestler (born 1977)

Personal information
- Born: 13 September 1977 (age 48) Tighina, Moldova

Sport
- Sport: Wrestling

Octavian Cuciuc (born 13 September 1977) is a Moldovan wrestler. He competed in the men's freestyle 58 kg at the 2000 Summer Olympics.
