= Michele Liuzzi =

Italian wrestler

Personal information
- Nationality: Italian
- Born: 23 February 1975 (age 51) Naples, Italy

Sport
- Sport: Wrestling

Michele Liuzzi (born 23 February 1975) is an Italian wrestler. He competed in the men's freestyle 57 kg at the 1996 Summer Olympics.
