= Sanshiro Abe =

Japanese wrestler (born 1970)

Personal information
- Nationality: Japanese
- Born: 12 May 1970 (age 56) Tokyo, Japan
- Height: 1.66 m (5 ft 5 in)
- Weight: 57 kg (126 lb)

Sport
- Sport: Wrestling
- Events: Freestyle and Folkstyle
- College team: Penn State
Medal record
Collegiate Wrestling
Representing the Penn State Nittany Lions
NCAA Division I Championships
Gold medal – first place	1996 Minneapolis	126 lb
Silver medal – second place	1995 Iowa City	126 lb
Bronze medal – third place	1994 Chapel Hill	126 lb

Sanshiro Abe, also known as Sonny Abe (阿部 三子郎, Abe Sanshirō; born 12 May 1970) is a Japanese former wrestler. He competed at the 1996 Summer Olympics, where he finished in ninth place in the 57kg freestyle class.

Abe competed collegiately for Penn State, where he was an NCAA champion and four-time All-American. He garnered NCAA All-American honors by finishing 4th, 3rd, 2nd and 1st, respectively, at consecutive NCAA Wrestling Championships.

== See also ==
- List of Pennsylvania State University Olympians
