= Othmar Kuhner =

German wrestler

Personal information
- Nationality: German
- Born: 23 December 1972 (age 53) Schramberg, West Germany

Sport
- Sport: Wrestling

Othmar Kuhner (born 23 December 1972) is a German former wrestler. He competed in the men's freestyle 58 kg at the 2000 Summer Olympics.
