= Abil Ibragimov =

Kazakhstani wrestler

Personal information
- Nationality: Kazakhstani
- Born: 11 June 1981 (age 45)

Sport
- Sport: Wrestling

Abil Ibragimov (born 11 June 1981) is a Kazakhstani wrestler. He competed in the men's freestyle 58 kg at the 2000 Summer Olympics.
