= Tony Purler =

American wrestler (born 1969)

Personal information
- Born: November 1, 1969 (age 56) Wentzville, Missouri, U.S.

Sport
- Country: United States
- Sport: Wrestling
- Events: Freestyle and Folkstyle
- College team: Nebraska, Oklahoma State
- Club: Sunkist Kids
- Team: USA
Medal record
Men's freestyle wrestling
Representing the United States
World Cup
Silver medal – second place	1999 Spokane	58 kg
Bronze medal – third place	1998 Stillwater	58 kg
Goodwill Games
Bronze medal – third place	1998 New York	58 kg
Collegiate Wrestling
NCAA Division I Championships
Representing the Nebraska Cornhuskers
Gold medal – first place	1993 Ames	126 lb
Representing the Oklahoma State Cowboys
Bronze medal – third place	1991 Iowa City	126 lb

Tony Purler (born November 1, 1969) is an American former folkstyle and freestyle wrestler. He represented the United States in freestyle wrestling at the 1997 World Championships and 1998 World Championships at 58 kg. As a collegiate wrestler, he was the 1993 126-pound NCAA Division I champion.

== Wrestling career ==
=== High School ===
He attended Wentzville Holt High School in Wentzville, Missouri. As a high school wrestler, Purler was a two-time Missouri state champion.

=== College ===
Purler started his college career at Oklahoma State, where he finished third at the 1991 NCAA championships at 126-pounds. He later transferred to Nebraska, where he won an NCAA title in 1993 at 126-pounds.

=== Senior level ===
Following his collegiate career, Purler earned two spots on the United States freestyle wrestling World Team. He represented the United States in freestyle wrestling at the 1997 and 1998 World Championships at 58 kg.
