= Ri Yong-sam =

North Korean wrestler (born 1972)

Personal information
- Nationality: North Korea
- Born: 22 August 1972 (age 54)

Sport
- Country: North Korea
Medal record
Men's freestyle wrestling
Representing North Korea
Olympic Games
Bronze medal – third place	1996 Atlanta	Bantamweight
Asian Games
Gold medal – first place	1998 Bangkok	58 kg
Asian Championships
Gold medal – first place	2000 Guilin	58 kg
Gold medal – first place	1999 Tashkent	58 kg
Gold medal – first place	1996 Xiaoshan	58 kg
Gold medal – first place	1992 Tehran	57 kg
Bronze medal – third place	1993 Ulaanbaatar	57 kg
World Military Games
Gold medal – first place	1995 Rome	57 kg

- Ri Yong-sam
- Hangul: 리영삼
- RR: Ri Yeongsam
- MR: Ri Yŏngsam

Ri Yong-sam (born August 22, 1972) is a North Korean wrestler. At the 1996 Summer Olympics he won the bronze medal in the 57 kg category, beating Harun Doğan of Turkey 3-0. He also competed at the 2000 Summer Olympics. He received a gold medal at the 1998 Asian Games.
