= Yevhen Buslovych =

Ukrainian wrestler (1972–2007)

Medal record

Men's freestyle wrestling

Representing Ukraine

Olympic Games
| Silver medal – second place | 2000 Sydney | 58 kg |

European Championships
| Bronze medal – third place | 1998 Bratislava | 58 kg |
| Bronze medal – third place | 2000 Budapest | 58 kg |

Military Games
| Silver medal – second place | 1999 Zagreb | 63 kg |

Yevgen Buslovych (26 January 1972 – 15 October 2007) was a Ukrainian wrestler who competed in the 2000 Summer Olympics.
