= Bagavdin Umakhanov =

Russian wrestler

Personal information
- Native name: Багаутдин Мустафаевич Умаханов
- Born: Khasavyurt, Dagestan, Russia
- Height: 160 cm (5 ft 3 in)
- Weight: 61 kg (134 lb; 9 st 8 lb)

Sport
- Club: Spartak, Rossiya, Makhachkala

Achievements and titles
- Olympic finals: 11th
Medal record
World Championships
Bronze medal – third place	1994 Istanbul	57 kg
World Cup
Gold medal – first place	1990 Toledo	52 kg
Gold medal – first place	1992 Moskow	57 kg
Gold medal – first place	1993 Chattanooga	57 kg
European Championships
Gold medal – first place	1991 Stuttgart	57 kg
Gold medal – first place	1992 Kaposvár	57 kg
Golden Grand Prix Ivan Yarygin
Gold medal – first place	1993 Krasnoyarsk	57 kg
Gold medal – first place	1994 Krasnoyarsk	57 kg
Gold medal – first place	1995 Krasnoyarsk	57 kg
Espoir World Championships
Gold medal – first place	1989 Ulaanbaatar	52 kg

Bagautdin Mustafayevich Umakhanov (born 2 June 1971 in Khasavyurt) is a Russian former wrestler who competed in the 1996 Summer Olympics. Bagautdin Umakhanov is known for his victories over the 1992 Olympic gold medalist and two-time World Champion Alejandro Puerto of Cuba, 2000 Olympic medalist and two-time World Champion Terry Brands of USA during their peak years. He is the brother of Murad Umakhanov.

== Highlight achievements ==
- Espoir World Champion, 1989.
- Three time Russian National Champion.
- Three time Golden Grand Prix Ivan Yarygin Tournament Champion, with wins over World champion Terry Brands in 1993, 1995.
- Two time European Champion.
- Three time World Cup Champion, with wins over Olympic champion Alejandro Puerto in 1993.
- Bronze medal at World Championships, 1994.
