= Jaanek Lips =

Estonian wrestler

Jaanek Lips (born 13 March 1977) is an Estonian wrestler.

He was born in Pärsti Rural Municipality, Viljandi County. In 2002 he graduated from Veritas University in Tallinn.

He began practising wrestling when he was 13 years old, coached by Aarne Kõiv. He has competed at the World Wrestling Championships. He is multiple-times Estonian champion. In 1994–2008 he was a member of Estonian national wrestling team. He won silver medal at 2019 Veterans World Wrestling Championships.
