= Andrej Fašánek =

Slovak wrestler

Personal information
- Nationality: Slovak
- Born: 1 December 1979 (age 46) Bratislava, Czechoslovakia

Sport
- Sport: Wrestling

Andrej Fašánek (born 1 December 1979) is a Slovak wrestler. He competed in the men's freestyle 58 kg at the 2000 Summer Olympics.
