= Petru Toarcă =

Romanian freestyle wrestler

Petru Toarca (born on October 4, 1975, Ozerne, Izmail Raion, Odesa Oblast, Ukraine) is a male freestyle wrestler from Romania. He participated in Men's freestyle 55 kg at 2008 Summer Olympics. In the 1/8 final he lost and was eliminated by Besarion Gochashvili from Georgia.

== Trivia ==
- Toarca was the oldest wrestler in Men's freestyle 55 kg at 2008 Summer Olympics.
