= Aleksandr Guzov =

Belarusian wrestler

Personal information
- Nationality: Belarusian
- Born: 24 June 1975 (age 51) Gomel, Belarus

Sport
- Sport: Wrestling

Aleksandr Guzov (born 24 June 1975) is a Belarusian wrestler. He competed at the 1996 Summer Olympics and the 2000 Summer Olympics.
