= Martin Berberyan =

Armenian freestyle wrestler (born 1980)

Personal information
- Born: 22 May 1980 (age 46) Yerevan, Armenian SSR, Soviet Union
- Height: 1.60 m (5 ft 3 in)
- Weight: 60 kg (130 lb)

Sport
- Sport: Wrestling
- Event: Freestyle
- Club: Republic Sportschool Yerevan
- Coached by: Samvel Margaryan
Medal record
Representing Armenia
Men's Freestyle Wrestling
World Championships
Bronze medal – third place	2005 Budapest	60 kg
European Championships
Gold medal – first place	2004 Ankara	55 kg

Martin Berberyan (Armenian: Մարտին Բերբերյան, born on 22 May 1980) is a retired Armenian Freestyle wrestler. He is an Armenian Champion, European Champion, World medalist and three-time Olympian. Berberyan was awarded the Master of Sport of Armenia, International Class title in 1998.

== Biography ==
Martin Berberyan started freestyle wrestling in 1987 under the teaching of Samvel Markarian. He became a Junior World Championships silver medalist in 1997 and a Junior European Champion in 1998. In 1999, Berberyan was selected as a member of the Armenian national freestyle wrestling team. Berberyan came in sixth place at the 2000 Summer Olympics in Sydney, his best Olympic result. Berberyan won a gold medal at the 2004 European Wrestling Championships. The 2004 European Championships were hosted by Ankara and competitions were held on April 24, the same day as the Armenian genocide committed by the Ottoman Empire began. Because Berberyan became a European Champion at the competition, the Armenian national anthem, Mer Hayrenik, was played in the Turkish capital on that day. The success of Martin Berberian received wide publicity in Armenia. Immediately after returning to Yerevan, National Olympic Committee of Armenia President Gagik Tsarukyan handed Berberyan the keys to a new car as a reward.

Berberyan came in eleventh place at the 2004 Summer Olympics in Athens. After the Olympics, he moved up in weight class, from 55 kg to 60 kg. He debuted in this new weight class in 2005. Berberyan won a bronze medal at the 2005 World Wrestling Championships that year. His career was interrupted for the next two years due to his recent marriage and move to the United States. Berberyan returned to the mat in 2008 and qualified to take part at the 2008 Summer Olympics in Beijing. He came in seventeenth place. After that, Martin Berberyan decided to complete his wrestling career. As of 2008, he is the main wrestling coach at the Los Angeles Sports Club, International Sports Union.
