= Cory O'Brien =

Australian wrestler

Personal information
- Nationality: Australian
- Born: 20 June 1972 (age 54) Melbourne, Australia

Sport
- Sport: Wrestling
Medal record
Representing Australia
Men's Wrestling
Commonwealth Games
Bronze medal – third place	1994 Victoria	Bantamweight

Cory Leigh O'Brien (born 20 June 1972) is an Australian wrestler. He competed at the 1996 Summer Olympics and the 2000 Summer Olympics.
