= Murad Umakhanov =

Russian wrestler (born 1977)

Medal record

Representing Russia

Men's freestyle wrestling

Olympic Games
Gold medal – first place	2000 Sydney	63 kg

Murad Umakhanov (born 3 January 1977 in Khasavyurt, Dagestan, Russia) is a Russian wrestler and Olympic champion in Freestyle wrestling.

Umakhanov competed at the 2000 Summer Olympics in Sydney where he won the gold medal in Freestyle wrestling, the featherweight class.
