= David Pogosian =

Georgian wrestler (born 1974)

Medal record

Men's freestyle wrestling

Representing Georgia

World Championships
Bronze medal – third place	2001 Patras	58 kg

European Championships
Gold medal – first place	1997 Warsaw	58 kg
Gold medal – first place	1998 Bratislava	58 kg

David Pogosian (Georgian: დავით პოღოსიანი; born August 21, 1974, in Gori, Georgian SSR) is a Georgian wrestler of Armenian descent. He won a bronze medal in the 2001 World Wrestling Championships at 58 kg.
