= Guivi Sissaouri =

Georgian-Canadian wrestler

Personal information
- Native name: გივი სისაური
- Nationality: Georgia; Canada
- Born: Guivi Sissaouri; April 15, 1971 (age 55) Tbilisi, Georgian Soviet Socialist Republic
- Home town: Montreal, Quebec, Canada
- Height: 163 cm (5 ft 4 in)

Sport
- Country: Canada
- Sport: Wrestling
- Weight class: 57–58 kg
- Event: Freestyle
Medal record
Men's freestyle wrestling
Representing Canada
Olympic Games
Silver medal – second place	1996 Atlanta	57 kg
World Championships
Gold medal – first place	2001 Sofia	58 kg
Silver medal – second place	1995 Atlanta	57 kg
Bronze medal – third place	1997 Krasnoyarsk	58 kg
Bronze medal – third place	1998 Tehran	58 kg
World Cup
Gold medal – first place	2002 Spokane	60kg
Commonwealth Games
Gold medal – first place	2002 Manchester	60 kg
Pan American Games
Silver medal – second place	2003 Santo Domingo	60 kg
Gold medal – first place	1999 Winnipeg	58 kg

Guivi "Gia" Sissaouri (Georgian: გივი სისაური, romanized: givi sisauri, born April 15, 1971) is a Georgian-Canadian former freestyle wrestler.

== Biography ==
Born in Tbilisi, Georgia, Sissaouri began wrestling at age ten. He would later become a citizen of Canada.

Sissaouri won the silver medal at the 1996 Summer Olympics in the 57 kg class. He also won the gold at the 2001 World Championships at Sofia, Bulgaria in the 58 kg class, a silver at the 1995 World Championships in Atlanta, Georgia in the 57 kg class, a bronze at the 1998 World Championships at Tehran, Iran in the 58 kg class, and another bronze at the 1997 World Championships at Krasnoyarsk, Russia also in the 58 kg class. In the 2002 Commonwealth Games, Sissaouri would win the gold medal in his division. He also competed in the 2004 Olympics, where he defeated the 2000 Olympic champion Murad Umakhanov and 2004 European champion Tevfik Odabaşı, but lost his third round and finished in sixth place.

Sissaouri also appeared on season 12 of The Ultimate Fighter as Georges St-Pierre's wrestling coach. He trains at the Montreal Wrestling Club.
