= Harun Doğan =

Turkish wrestler (born 1976)

Personal information
- Nationality: Turkish
- Born: 1 January 1976 (age 50) Kahramanmaraş, Turkey

Sport
- Sport: Sport wrestling
- Event: Freestyle

Achievements and titles
- National finals: Turkish
- Highest world ranking: World Champion
Medal record
Men's freestyle wrestling
Representing Turkey
World Championships
Gold medal – first place	1999 Ankara	58 kg
Silver medal – second place	1998 Tehran	58 kg
Bronze medal – third place	1995 Atlanta	57 kg
European Championships
Gold medal – first place	1999 Minsk	58 kg
Silver medal – second place	1996 Budapest	57 kg
Mediterranean Games
Gold medal – first place	1997 Pescara	57 kg

Harun Doğan (1 January 1976 in Kahramanmaraş, Turkey) is a Turkish retired World and European champion sports wrestler competing in the -58 kg division of men's freestyle wrestling. He was coached by Avni Tarhan. In 2005 he was banned from sport for life after his second doping violation.

== Scandal ==
At the 2000 Summer Olympics, he caused scandals. In his second match in the elimination round, he did not wear the official Turkish wrestling singlet with the national star and crescent insignia but his own singlet despite warnings of the team leader. At his third match, he deliberately did not show, and lost the match against Russian Murad Ramazanov by forfeit. For his unsportsmanlike behaviour, Harun Doğan was punished later by the Turkish Federation, and was not taken into the team participating at the 4th World University Wrestling Championships held 2000 in Tokyo, Japan.

== Doping cases ==
Harun Doğan was involved in a doping case at the 2002 World Wrestling Championships held in Tehran, Iran. He tested positive for the banned substance ephedrine, and was suspended from wrestling for two years.

At the 2005 Turkish National Championship Doğan tested positive for the anabolic steroid metenolone, and was subsequently banned from sport for life.

== Achievements ==
- 1990 World Youth Championship, Hungary - (gold) 43 kg
- 1991 World Youth Championship, Canada - (gold) 47 kg
- 1992 World Youth Championship, Colombia - (silver) 50 kg
- 1994 European Junior Championship, Finland - (silver) 57 kg
- 1995 World Wrestling Championships, USA - (bronze) 57 kg
- 1995 European Wrestling Championships, Switzerland - 5th 57 kg
- 1996 European Wrestling Championships, Hungary - (silver) 57 kg
- 1996 Summer Olympics, USA - 4th 57 kg
- 1997 Mediterranean Games, Italy - (gold) 58 kg
- 1998 European Wrestling Championships, Slovakia - 8th 58 kg
- 1998 World Wrestling Championships, Iran - (silver) 58 kg
- 1999 European Wrestling Championships, Russia - (gold) 58 kg
- 1999 World Wrestling Championships, Turkey - (gold) 58 kg
- 2000 Summer Olympics, Australia - 15th 58 kg
- 2004 Summer Olympics, USA - 20th 55 kg
