= List of Olympic medalists in freestyle wrestling =

This is the complete list of Olympic medalists in freestyle wrestling.

== Current program ==
=== Men ===
==== Bantamweight ====
- 56.70 kg: 1904
- 54 kg: 1908
- 56 kg: 1924–1936
- 57 kg: 1948–1996
- 58 kg: 2000
- 55 kg: 2004–2012
- 57 kg: 2016–present

Games	Gold	Silver	Bronze
1904 St. Louis	Isidor Niflot; United States	August Wester; United States	Louis Strebler; United States
1908 London	George Mehnert; United States	William J. Press; Great Britain	Aubert Côté; Canada
1912–1920	not included in the Olympic program		
1924 Paris	Kustaa Pihlajamäki; Finland	Kaarlo Mäkinen; Finland	Bryan Hines; United States
1928 Amsterdam	Kaarlo Mäkinen; Finland	Edmond Spapen; Belgium	James Trifunov; Canada
1932 Los Angeles	Robert Pearce; United States	Ödön Zombori; Hungary	Aatos Jaskari; Finland
1936 Berlin	Ödön Zombori; Hungary	Ross Flood; United States	Johannes Herbert; Germany
1948 London	Nasuh Akar; Turkey	Gerald Leeman; United States	Charles Kouyos; France
1952 Helsinki	Shohachi Ishii; Japan	Rashid Mamedbekov; Soviet Union	Khashaba Dadasaheb Jadhav; India
1956 Melbourne	Mustafa Dağıstanlı; Turkey	Mehdi Yaghoubi; Iran	Mikhail Shakhov; Soviet Union
1960 Rome	Terrence McCann; United States	Nezhdet Zalev; Bulgaria	Tadeusz Trojanowski; Poland
1964 Tokyo	Yojiro Uetake; Japan	Hüseyin Akbaş; Turkey	Aydin Ibragimov; Soviet Union
1968 Mexico City	Yojiro Uetake; Japan	Donald Behm; United States	Aboutaleb Talebi; Iran
1972 Munich	Hideaki Yanagida; Japan	Richard Sanders; United States	László Klinga; Hungary
1976 Montreal	Vladimir Yumin; Soviet Union	Hans-Dieter Brüchert; East Germany	Masao Arai; Japan
1980 Moscow	Sergey Beloglazov; Soviet Union	Li Ho-Pyong; North Korea	Dugarsürengiin Oyuunbold; Mongolia
1984 Los Angeles	Hideaki Tomiyama; Japan	Barry Davis; United States	Kim Eui-Kon; South Korea
1988 Seoul	Sergey Beloglazov; Soviet Union	Askari Mohammadian; Iran	Noh Kyung-Sun; South Korea
1992 Barcelona	Alejandro Puerto; Cuba	Sergey Smal; Unified Team	Kim Yong-sik; North Korea
1996 Atlanta	Kendall Cross; United States	Guivi Sissaouri; Canada	Ri Yong-sam; North Korea
2000 Sydney	Alireza Dabir; Iran	Yevhen Buslovych; Ukraine	Terry Brands; United States
2004 Athens	Mavlet Batirov; Russia	Stephen Abas; United States	Chikara Tanabe; Japan
2008 Beijing	Henry Cejudo; United States	Tomohiro Matsunaga; Japan	Radoslav Velikov; Bulgaria
2008 Beijing	Henry Cejudo; United States	Tomohiro Matsunaga; Japan	Besik Kudukhov; Russia
2012 London	Dzhamal Otarsultanov; Russia	Vladimer Khinchegashvili; Georgia	Shinichi Yumoto; Japan
2012 London	Dzhamal Otarsultanov; Russia	Vladimer Khinchegashvili; Georgia	Yang Kyong-il; North Korea
2016 Rio de Janeiro	Vladimer Khinchegashvili; Georgia	Rei Higuchi; Japan	Haji Aliyev; Azerbaijan
2016 Rio de Janeiro	Vladimer Khinchegashvili; Georgia	Rei Higuchi; Japan	Hassan Rahimi; Iran
2020 Tokyo	Zaur Uguev; ROC	Ravi Kumar Dahiya; India	Nurislam Sanayev; Kazakhstan
2020 Tokyo	Zaur Uguev; ROC	Ravi Kumar Dahiya; India	Thomas Gilman; United States
2024 Paris	Rei Higuchi; Japan	Spencer Lee; United States	Aman Sehrawat; India
2024 Paris	Rei Higuchi; Japan	Spencer Lee; United States	Gulomjon Abdullaev; Uzbekistan
2028 Los Angeles			

==== Lightweight ====
- −65.77 kg (1904)
- −66.6 kg (1908)
- −67.5 kg (1920–1936)
- −67 kg (1948–1960)
- −70 kg (1964–1968)
- −68 kg (1972–1996)
- −69 kg (2000)
- −66 kg (2004–2012)
- −65 kg (2016–present)

Games	Gold	Silver	Bronze
1904 St. Louis	Otto Roehm; United States	Rudolph Tesing; United States	Albert Zirkel; United States
1908 London	George de Relwyskow; Great Britain	William Wood; Great Britain	Albert Gingell; Great Britain
1912 Stockholm	not included in the Olympic program		
1920 Antwerp	Kalle Anttila; Finland	Gottfrid Svensson; Sweden	Herbert Wright; Great Britain
1924 Paris	Russell Vis; United States	Volmar Wikström; Finland	Arvo Haavisto; Finland
1928 Amsterdam	Osvald Käpp; Estonia	Charles Pacôme; France	Eino Augusti Leino; Finland
1932 Los Angeles	Charles Pacôme; France	Károly Kárpáti; Hungary	Gustaf Klarén; Sweden
1936 Berlin	Károly Kárpáti; Hungary	Wolfgang Ehrl; Germany	Hermanni Pihlajamäki; Finland
1948 London	Celal Atik; Turkey	Gösta Frändfors; Sweden	Hermann Baumann; Switzerland
1952 Helsinki	Olle Anderberg; Sweden	Jay Thomas Evans; United States	Tofigh Jahanbakht; Iran
1956 Melbourne	Emam-Ali Habibi; Iran	Shigeru Kasahara; Japan	Alimbeg Bestaev; Soviet Union
1960 Rome	Shelby Wilson; United States	Vladimir Sinyavsky; Soviet Union	Enyu Valchev; Bulgaria
1964 Tokyo	Enyu Valchev; Bulgaria	Klaus Rost; United Team of Germany	Iwao Horiuchi; Japan
1968 Mexico City	Abdollah Movahed; Iran	Enyu Valchev; Bulgaria	Danzandarjaagiin Sereeter; Mongolia
1972 Munich	Dan Gable; United States	Kikuo Wada; Japan	Ruslan Ashuraliyev; Soviet Union
1976 Montreal	Pavel Pinigin; Soviet Union	Lloyd Keaser; United States	Yasaburo Sugawara; Japan
1980 Moscow	Saypulla Absaidov; Soviet Union	Ivan Yankov; Bulgaria	Šaban Sejdiu; Yugoslavia
1984 Los Angeles	You In-tak; South Korea	Andrew Rein; United States	Jukka Rauhala; Finland
1988 Seoul	Arsen Fadzaev; Soviet Union	Park Jang-Soon; South Korea	Nate Carr; United States
1992 Barcelona	Arsen Fadzaev; Unified Team	Valentin Getsov; Bulgaria	Kosei Akaishi; Japan
1996 Atlanta	Vadim Bogiev; Russia	Townsend Saunders; United States	Zaza Zazirov; Ukraine
2000 Sydney	Daniel Igali; Canada	Arsen Gitinov; Russia	Lincoln McIlravy; United States
2004 Athens	Elbrus Tedeyev; Ukraine	Jamill Kelly; United States	Makhach Murtazaliev; Russia
2008 Beijing	Ramazan Şahin; Turkey	Andriy Stadnik; Ukraine	Otar Tushishvili; Georgia
2008 Beijing	Ramazan Şahin; Turkey	Andriy Stadnik; Ukraine	Sushil Kumar; India
2012 London	Tatsuhiro Yonemitsu; Japan	Sushil Kumar; India	Liván López; Cuba
2012 London	Tatsuhiro Yonemitsu; Japan	Sushil Kumar; India	Akzhurek Tanatarov; Kazakhstan
2016 Rio de Janeiro	Soslan Ramonov; Russia	Toghrul Asgarov; Azerbaijan	Frank Chamizo; Italy
2016 Rio de Janeiro	Soslan Ramonov; Russia	Toghrul Asgarov; Azerbaijan	Ikhtiyor Navruzov; Uzbekistan
2020 Tokyo	Takuto Otoguro; Japan	Haji Aliyev; Azerbaijan	Bajrang Punia; India
2020 Tokyo	Takuto Otoguro; Japan	Haji Aliyev; Azerbaijan	Gadzhimurad Rashidov; ROC
2024 Paris	Kotaro Kiyooka; Japan	Rahman Amouzad; Iran	Islam Dudaev; Albania
2024 Paris	Kotaro Kiyooka; Japan	Rahman Amouzad; Iran	Sebastian Rivera; Puerto Rico
2028 Los Angeles			

==== Welterweight ====
- −71.67 kg (1904)
- −72 kg (1924–1936)
- −73 kg (1948–1960)
- −78 kg (1964–1968)
- −74 kg (1972–1996)
- −76 kg (2000)
- −74 kg (2004–present)

Games	Gold	Silver	Bronze
1904 St. Louis	Charles Ericksen (NOR); United States (Note: As Norwegian Charles Ericksen (NOR) represented an American club, his participation and medals are attributed to the United States. (Note: In 2024, the International Olympic Committee (IOC) reinstated its original and current attribution policy for athletes at the early Olympic Games (1896–1904). Participation and medals have been attributed according to the national affiliation of the club or team represented by the athlete, rather than their nationality.))	William Beckmann; United States	Jerry Winholtz; United States
1908–1920	not included in the Olympic program		
1924 Paris	Hermann Gehri; Switzerland	Eino Leino; Finland	Otto Müller; Switzerland
1928 Amsterdam	Arvo Haavisto; Finland	Lloyd Appleton; United States	Maurice Letchford; Canada
1932 Los Angeles	Jack van Bebber; United States	Daniel MacDonald; Canada	Eino Leino; Finland
1936 Berlin	Frank Lewis; United States	Thure Andersson; Sweden	Joseph Schleimer; Canada
1948 London	Yaşar Doğu; Turkey	Richard Garrard; Australia	Leland Merrill; United States
1952 Helsinki	William Smith; United States	Per Berlin; Sweden	Abdollah Mojtabavi; Iran
1956 Melbourne	Mitsuo Ikeda; Japan	İbrahim Zengin; Turkey	Vakhtang Balavadze; Soviet Union
1960 Rome	Douglas Blubaugh; United States	İsmail Ogan; Turkey	Muhammed Bashir; Pakistan
1964 Tokyo	İsmail Ogan; Turkey	Guram Sagaradze; Soviet Union	Mohammad Ali Sanatkaran; Iran
1968 Mexico City	Mahmut Atalay; Turkey	Daniel Robin; France	Tömöriin Artag; Mongolia
1972 Munich	Wayne Wells; United States	Jan Karlsson; Sweden	Adolf Seger; West Germany
1976 Montreal	Jiichiro Date; Japan	Mansour Barzegar; Iran	Stanley Dziedzic; United States
1980 Moscow	Valentin Raychev; Bulgaria	Jamtsyn Davaajav; Mongolia	Dan Karabin; Czechoslovakia
1984 Los Angeles	Dave Schultz; United States	Martin Knosp; West Germany	Šaban Sejdiu; Yugoslavia
1988 Seoul	Kenny Monday; United States	Adlan Varaev; Soviet Union	Rahmat Sukra; Bulgaria
1992 Barcelona	Park Jang-soon; South Korea	Kenny Monday; United States	Amir Reza Khadem; Iran
1996 Atlanta	Buvaisar Saitiev; Russia	Park Jang-soon; South Korea	Takuya Ota; Japan
2000 Sydney	Brandon Slay; United States	Moon Eui-jae; South Korea	Adem Bereket; Turkey
2004 Athens	Buvaisar Saitiev; Russia	Gennadiy Laliyev; Kazakhstan	Iván Fundora; Cuba
2008 Beijing	Buvaisar Saitiev; Russia	Murad Gaidarov; Belarus	Kiril Terziev; Bulgaria
2008 Beijing	Buvaisar Saitiev; Russia	Murad Gaidarov; Belarus	Gheorghiță Ștefan; Romania
2012 London	Jordan Burroughs; United States	Sadegh Goudarzi; Iran	Gábor Hatos; Hungary
2012 London	Jordan Burroughs; United States	Sadegh Goudarzi; Iran	Denis Tsargush; Russia
2016 Rio de Janeiro	Hassan Yazdani; Iran	Aniuar Geduev; Russia	Jabrayil Hasanov; Azerbaijan
2016 Rio de Janeiro	Hassan Yazdani; Iran	Aniuar Geduev; Russia	Soner Demirtaş; Turkey
2020 Tokyo	Zaurbek Sidakov; ROC	Mahamedkhabib Kadzimahamedau; Belarus	Kyle Dake; United States
2020 Tokyo	Zaurbek Sidakov; ROC	Mahamedkhabib Kadzimahamedau; Belarus	Bekzod Abdurakhmonov; Uzbekistan
2024 Paris	Razambek Zhamalov; Uzbekistan	Daichi Takatani; Japan	Chermen Valiev; Albania
2024 Paris	Razambek Zhamalov; Uzbekistan	Daichi Takatani; Japan	Kyle Dake; United States
2028 Los Angeles			

==== Middleweight ====
- −73 kg (1908)
- −75 kg (1920)
- −75 kg (1924–1960)
- −87 kg (1964–1968)
- −82 kg (1972–1996)
- −85 kg (2000)
- −84 kg (2004–2012)
- −86 kg (2016–present)

Games	Gold	Silver	Bronze
1908 London	Stanley Bacon; Great Britain	George de Relwyskow; Great Britain	Frederick Beck; Great Britain
1912 Stockholm	not included in the Olympic program		
1920 Antwerp	Eino Leino; Finland	Väinö Penttala; Finland	Charles Johnson; United States
1924 Paris	Fritz Hagmann; Switzerland	Pierre Ollivier; Belgium	Vilho Pekkala; Finland
1928 Amsterdam	Ernst Kyburz; Switzerland	Donald Stockton; Canada	Samuel Rabin; Great Britain
1932 Los Angeles	Ivar Johansson; Sweden	Kyösti Luukko; Finland	József Tunyogi; Hungary
1936 Berlin	Émile Poilvé; France	Richard Voliva; United States	Ahmet Kireççi; Turkey
1948 London	Glen Brand; United States	Adil Candemir; Turkey	Erik Lindén; Sweden
1952 Helsinki	David Tsimakuridze; Soviet Union	Gholamreza Takhti; Iran	György Gurics; Hungary
1956 Melbourne	Nikola Stanchev; Bulgaria	Daniel Hodge; United States	Georgi Skhirtladze; Soviet Union
1960 Rome	Hasan Güngör; Turkey	Georgy Skhirtladze; Soviet Union	Hans Antonsson; Sweden
1964 Tokyo	Prodan Gardzhev; Bulgaria	Hasan Güngör; Turkey	Daniel Brand; United States
1968 Mexico City	Boris Gurevich; Soviet Union	Jigjidiin Mönkhbat; Mongolia	Prodan Gardzhev; Bulgaria
1972 Munich	Levan Tediashvili; Soviet Union	John Peterson; United States	Vasile Iorga; Romania
1976 Montreal	John Peterson; United States	Viktor Novozhilov; Soviet Union	Adolf Seger; West Germany
1980 Moscow	Ismail Abilov; Bulgaria	Magomedkhan Aratsilov; Soviet Union	István Kovács; Hungary
1984 Los Angeles	Mark Schultz; United States	Hideyuki Nagashima; Japan	Christopher Rinke; Canada
1988 Seoul	Han Myung-woo; South Korea	Necmi Gençalp; Turkey	Jozef Lohyňa; Czechoslovakia
1992 Barcelona	Kevin Jackson; United States	Elmadi Zhabrailov; Unified Team	Rasoul Khadem; Iran
1996 Atlanta	Khadzhimurad Magomedov; Russia	Yang Hyung-mo; South Korea	Amir Reza Khadem; Iran
2000 Sydney	Adam Saitiev; Russia	Yoel Romero; Cuba	Magomed Ibragimov; Macedonia
2004 Athens	Cael Sanderson; United States	Moon Eui-jae; South Korea	Sazhid Sazhidov; Russia
2008 Beijing	Revaz Mindorashvili; Georgia	Yusup Abdusalomov; Tajikistan	Georgy Ketoev; Russia
2008 Beijing	Revaz Mindorashvili; Georgia	Yusup Abdusalomov; Tajikistan	Taras Danko; Ukraine
2012 London	Sharif Sharifov; Azerbaijan	Jaime Espinal; Puerto Rico	Dato Marsagishvili; Georgia
2012 London	Sharif Sharifov; Azerbaijan	Jaime Espinal; Puerto Rico	Ehsan Lashgari; Iran
2016 Rio de Janeiro	Abdulrashid Sadulaev; Russia	Selim Yaşar; Turkey	Sharif Sharifov; Azerbaijan
2016 Rio de Janeiro	Abdulrashid Sadulaev; Russia	Selim Yaşar; Turkey	J'den Cox; United States
2020 Tokyo	David Taylor; United States	Hassan Yazdani; Iran	Artur Naifonov; ROC
2020 Tokyo	David Taylor; United States	Hassan Yazdani; Iran	Myles Amine; San Marino
2024 Paris	Magomed Ramazanov; Bulgaria	Hassan Yazdani; Iran	Dauren Kurugliev; Greece
2024 Paris	Magomed Ramazanov; Bulgaria	Hassan Yazdani; Iran	Aaron Brooks; United States
2028 Los Angeles			

==== Heavyweight ====
- +71.67 kg (1904)
- +73 kg (1908)
- +82.5 kg (1920)
- +87 kg (1924–1960)
- +97 kg (1964–1968)
- −100 kg (1972–1996)
- −97 kg (2000)
- −96 kg (2004–2012)
- −97 kg (2016–present)

Games	Gold	Silver	Bronze
1904 St. Louis	Bernhoff Hansen (NOR); United States (Note: As Norwegian Bernhoff Hansen (NOR) represented an American club, his participation and medals are attributed to the United States.)	Frank Kugler (GER); United States (Note: As German Frank Kugler (GER) represented an American club, his participation and medals are attributed to the United States.)	Fred Warmbold; United States
1908 London	Con O'Kelly; Great Britain	Jacob Gundersen; Norway	Edward Barrett; Great Britain
1912 Stockholm	not included in the Olympic program		
1920 Antwerp	Robert Roth; Switzerland	Nat Pendleton; United States	Ernst Nilsson; Sweden
1920 Antwerp	Robert Roth; Switzerland	Nat Pendleton; United States	Fred Meyer; United States
1924 Paris	Harry Steel; United States	Henri Wernli; Switzerland	Archie MacDonald; Great Britain
1928 Amsterdam	Johan Richthoff; Sweden	Aukusti Sihvola; Finland	Edmond Dame; France
1932 Los Angeles	Johan Richthoff; Sweden	John Riley; United States	Nickolaus Hirschl; Austria
1936 Berlin	Kristjan Palusalu; Estonia	Josef Klapuch; Czechoslovakia	Hjalmar Nyström; Finland
1948 London	Gyula Bóbis; Hungary	Bertil Antonsson; Sweden	Jim Armstrong; Australia
1952 Helsinki	Arsen Mekokishvili; Soviet Union	Bertil Antonsson; Sweden	Kenneth Richmond; Great Britain
1956 Melbourne	Hamit Kaplan; Turkey	Hussein Mehmedov; Bulgaria	Taisto Kangasniemi; Finland
1960 Rome	Wilfried Dietrich; United Team of Germany	Hamit Kaplan; Turkey	Savkuz Dzarasov; Soviet Union
1964 Tokyo	Aleksandr Ivanitsky; Soviet Union	Lyutvi Ahmedov; Bulgaria	Hamit Kaplan; Turkey
1968 Mexico City	Aleksandr Medved; Soviet Union	Osman Duraliev; Bulgaria	Wilfried Dietrich; West Germany
1972 Munich	Ivan Yarygin; Soviet Union	Khorloogiin Bayanmönkh; Mongolia	József Csatári; Hungary
1976 Montreal	Ivan Yarygin; Soviet Union	Russell Hellickson; United States	Dimo Kostov; Bulgaria
1980 Moscow	Ilya Mate; Soviet Union	Slavcho Chervenkov; Bulgaria	Július Strnisko; Czechoslovakia
1984 Los Angeles	Lou Banach; United States	Joseph Atiyeh; Syria	Vasile Puşcaşu; Romania
1988 Seoul	Vasile Puşcaşu; Romania	Leri Khabelov; Soviet Union	William Scherr; United States
1992 Barcelona	Leri Khabelov; Unified Team	Heiko Balz; Germany	Ali Kayalı; Turkey
1996 Atlanta	Kurt Angle; United States	Abbas Jadidi; Iran	Arawat Sabejew; Germany
2000 Sydney	Sagid Murtazaliev; Russia	Islam Bayramukov; Kazakhstan	Eldar Kurtanidze; Georgia
2004 Athens	Khadzhimurat Gatsalov; Russia	Magomed Ibragimov; Uzbekistan	Alireza Heidari; Iran
2008 Beijing	Shirvani Muradov; Russia	Giorgi Gogshelidze; Georgia	Khetag Gazyumov; Azerbaijan
2008 Beijing	Shirvani Muradov; Russia	Giorgi Gogshelidze; Georgia	Michel Batista; Cuba
2012 London	Jake Varner; United States	Valeriy Andriytsev; Ukraine	Khetag Gazyumov; Azerbaijan
2012 London	Jake Varner; United States	Valeriy Andriytsev; Ukraine	Giorgi Gogshelidze; Georgia
2016 Rio de Janeiro	Kyle Snyder; United States	Khetag Gazyumov; Azerbaijan	Albert Saritov; Romania
2016 Rio de Janeiro	Kyle Snyder; United States	Khetag Gazyumov; Azerbaijan	Magomed Ibragimov; Uzbekistan
2020 Tokyo	Abdulrashid Sadulaev; ROC	Kyle Snyder; United States	Reineris Salas; Cuba
2020 Tokyo	Abdulrashid Sadulaev; ROC	Kyle Snyder; United States	Abraham Conyedo; Italy
2024 Paris	Akhmed Tazhudinov; Bahrain	Givi Matcharashvili; Georgia	Magomedkhan Magomedov; Azerbaijan
2024 Paris	Akhmed Tazhudinov; Bahrain	Givi Matcharashvili; Georgia	Amir Ali Azarpira; Iran
2028 Los Angeles			

==== Super heavyweight ====
- +100 kg (1972–1984)
- −130 kg (1988–2000)
- −120 kg (2004–2012)
- −125 kg (2016–present)

Games	Gold	Silver	Bronze
1972 Munich	Aleksandr Medved; Soviet Union	Osman Duraliev; Bulgaria	Chris Taylor; United States
1976 Montreal	Soslan Andiyev; Soviet Union	József Balla; Hungary	Ladislau Şimon; Romania
1980 Moscow	Soslan Andiyev; Soviet Union	József Balla; Hungary	Adam Sandurski; Poland
1984 Los Angeles	Bruce Baumgartner; United States	Robert Molle; Canada	Ayhan Taşkın; Turkey
1988 Seoul	David Gobejishvili; Soviet Union	Bruce Baumgartner; United States	Andreas Schröder; East Germany
1992 Barcelona	Bruce Baumgartner; United States	Jeff Thue; Canada	David Gobejishvili; Unified Team
1996 Atlanta	Mahmut Demir; Turkey	Aleksey Medvedev; Belarus	Bruce Baumgartner; United States
2000 Sydney	David Musulbes; Russia	Artur Taymazov; Uzbekistan	Alexis Rodríguez; Cuba
2004 Athens	Artur Taymazov; Uzbekistan	Alireza Rezaei; Iran	Aydın Polatçı; Turkey
2008 Beijing	Bakhtiyar Akhmedov; Russia	David Musuľbes; Slovakia	Disney Rodríguez; Cuba
2008 Beijing	Bakhtiyar Akhmedov; Russia	David Musuľbes; Slovakia	Marid Mutalimov; Kazakhstan
2012 London	Komeil Ghasemi; Iran	Shared gold	Daulet Shabanbay; Kazakhstan
2012 London	Bilyal Makhov; Russia	Shared gold	Tervel Dlagnev; United States
2016 Rio de Janeiro	Taha Akgül; Turkey	Komeil Ghasemi; Iran	Ibrahim Saidau; Belarus
2016 Rio de Janeiro	Taha Akgül; Turkey	Komeil Ghasemi; Iran	Geno Petriashvili; Georgia
2020 Tokyo	Gable Steveson; United States	Geno Petriashvili; Georgia	Amir Hossein Zare; Iran
2020 Tokyo	Gable Steveson; United States	Geno Petriashvili; Georgia	Taha Akgül; Turkey
2024 Paris	Geno Petriashvili; Georgia	Amir Hossein Zare; Iran	Giorgi Meshvildishvili; Azerbaijan
2024 Paris	Geno Petriashvili; Georgia	Amir Hossein Zare; Iran	Taha Akgül; Turkey
2028 Los Angeles			

=== Women ===
==== Flyweight ====
- 48 kg: 2004–2016
- 50 kg: 2020–present

Games	Gold	Silver	Bronze
2004 Athens	Iryna Merleni; Ukraine	Chiharu Icho; Japan	Patricia Miranda; United States
2008 Beijing	Carol Huynh; Canada	Chiharu Icho; Japan	Mariya Stadnik; Azerbaijan
2008 Beijing	Carol Huynh; Canada	Chiharu Icho; Japan	Iryna Merleni; Ukraine
2012 London	Hitomi Obara; Japan	Mariya Stadnik; Azerbaijan	Carol Huynh; Canada
2012 London	Hitomi Obara; Japan	Mariya Stadnik; Azerbaijan	Clarissa Chun; United States
2016 Rio de Janeiro	Eri Tosaka; Japan	Mariya Stadnik; Azerbaijan	Elitsa Yankova; Bulgaria
2016 Rio de Janeiro	Eri Tosaka; Japan	Mariya Stadnik; Azerbaijan	Sun Yanan; China
2020 Tokyo	Yui Susaki; Japan	Sun Yanan; China	Mariya Stadnik; Azerbaijan
2020 Tokyo	Yui Susaki; Japan	Sun Yanan; China	Sarah Hildebrandt; United States
2024 Paris	Sarah Hildebrandt; United States	Yusneylys Guzmán; Cuba	Feng Ziqi; China
2024 Paris	Sarah Hildebrandt; United States	Yusneylys Guzmán; Cuba	Yui Susaki; Japan
2028 Los Angeles			

==== Bantamweight ====
- 53 kg: 2016–present

Games	Gold	Silver	Bronze
2016 Rio de Janeiro	Helen Maroulis; United States	Saori Yoshida; Japan	Nataliya Synyshyn; Azerbaijan
2016 Rio de Janeiro	Helen Maroulis; United States	Saori Yoshida; Japan	Sofia Mattsson; Sweden
2020 Tokyo	Mayu Mukaida; Japan	Pang Qianyu; China	Vanesa Kaladzinskaya; Belarus
2020 Tokyo	Mayu Mukaida; Japan	Pang Qianyu; China	Bat-Ochiryn Bolortuyaa; Mongolia
2024 Paris	Akari Fujinami; Japan	Lucía Yépez; Ecuador	Pang Qianyu; China
2024 Paris	Akari Fujinami; Japan	Lucía Yépez; Ecuador	Choe Hyo-gyong; North Korea
2028 Los Angeles			

==== Lightweight ====
- 55 kg: 2004–2012
- 58 kg: 2016
- 57 kg: 2020–present

Games	Gold	Silver	Bronze
2004 Athens	Saori Yoshida; Japan	Tonya Verbeek; Canada	Anna Gomis; France
2008 Beijing	Saori Yoshida; Japan	Xu Li; China	Tonya Verbeek; Canada
2008 Beijing	Saori Yoshida; Japan	Xu Li; China	Jackeline Rentería; Colombia
2012 London	Saori Yoshida; Japan	Tonya Verbeek; Canada	Yuliya Ratkevich; Azerbaijan
2012 London	Saori Yoshida; Japan	Tonya Verbeek; Canada	Jackeline Rentería; Colombia
2016 Rio de Janeiro	Kaori Icho; Japan	Valeria Koblova; Russia	Sakshi Malik; India
2016 Rio de Janeiro	Kaori Icho; Japan	Valeria Koblova; Russia	Marwa Amri; Tunisia
2020 Tokyo	Risako Kawai; Japan	Iryna Kurachkina; Belarus	Evelina Nikolova; Bulgaria
2020 Tokyo	Risako Kawai; Japan	Iryna Kurachkina; Belarus	Helen Maroulis; United States
2024 Paris	Tsugumi Sakurai; Japan	Anastasia Nichita; Moldova	Hong Kexin; China
2024 Paris	Tsugumi Sakurai; Japan	Anastasia Nichita; Moldova	Helen Maroulis; United States
2028 Los Angeles			

==== Middleweight ====
- 63 kg: 2004–2016
- 62 kg: 2020–present

Games	Gold	Silver	Bronze
2004 Athens	Kaori Icho; Japan	Sara McMann; United States	Lise Legrand; France
2008 Beijing	Kaori Icho; Japan	Alena Kartashova; Russia	Yelena Shalygina; Kazakhstan
2008 Beijing	Kaori Icho; Japan	Alena Kartashova; Russia	Randi Miller; United States
2012 London	Kaori Icho; Japan	Jing Ruixue; China	Soronzonboldyn Battsetseg; Mongolia
2012 London	Kaori Icho; Japan	Jing Ruixue; China	Lubov Volosova; Russia
2016 Rio de Janeiro	Risako Kawai; Japan	Maryia Mamashuk; Belarus	Yekaterina Larionova; Kazakhstan
2016 Rio de Janeiro	Risako Kawai; Japan	Maryia Mamashuk; Belarus	Monika Michalik; Poland
2020 Tokyo	Yukako Kawai; Japan	Aisuluu Tynybekova; Kyrgyzstan	Taybe Yusein; Bulgaria
2020 Tokyo	Yukako Kawai; Japan	Aisuluu Tynybekova; Kyrgyzstan	Iryna Koliadenko; Ukraine
2024 Paris	Sakura Motoki; Japan	Iryna Koliadenko; Ukraine	Aisuluu Tynybekova; Kyrgyzstan
2024 Paris	Sakura Motoki; Japan	Iryna Koliadenko; Ukraine	Grace Bullen; Norway
2028 Los Angeles			

==== Light heavyweight ====
- 69 kg: 2016
- 68 kg: 2020–present

Games	Gold	Silver	Bronze
2016 Rio de Janeiro	Sara Dosho; Japan	Natalia Vorobieva; Russia	Elmira Syzdykova; Kazakhstan
2016 Rio de Janeiro	Sara Dosho; Japan	Natalia Vorobieva; Russia	Jenny Fransson; Sweden
2020 Tokyo	Tamyra Mensah-Stock; United States	Blessing Oborududu; Nigeria	Meerim Zhumanazarova; Kyrgyzstan
2020 Tokyo	Tamyra Mensah-Stock; United States	Blessing Oborududu; Nigeria	Alla Cherkasova; Ukraine
2024 Paris	Amit Elor; United States	Meerim Zhumanazarova; Kyrgyzstan	Nonoka Ozaki; Japan
2024 Paris	Amit Elor; United States	Meerim Zhumanazarova; Kyrgyzstan	Buse Tosun Çavuşoğlu; Turkey
2028 Los Angeles			

==== Heavyweight ====
- 72 kg: 2004–2012
- 75 kg: 2016
- 76 kg: 2020–present

Games	Gold	Silver	Bronze
2004 Athens	Wang Xu; China	Guzel Manyurova; Russia	Kyoko Hamaguchi; Japan
2008 Beijing	Wang Jiao; China	Stanka Zlateva; Bulgaria	Kyoko Hamaguchi; Japan
2008 Beijing	Wang Jiao; China	Stanka Zlateva; Bulgaria	Agnieszka Wieszczek; Poland
2012 London	Natalia Vorobieva; Russia	Stanka Zlateva; Bulgaria	Guzel Manyurova; Kazakhstan
2012 London	Natalia Vorobieva; Russia	Stanka Zlateva; Bulgaria	Maider Unda; Spain
2016 Rio de Janeiro	Erica Wiebe; Canada	Guzel Manyurova; Kazakhstan	Zhang Fengliu; China
2016 Rio de Janeiro	Erica Wiebe; Canada	Guzel Manyurova; Kazakhstan	Ekaterina Bukina; Russia
2020 Tokyo	Aline Rotter-Focken; Germany	Adeline Gray; United States	Zhou Qian; China
2020 Tokyo	Aline Rotter-Focken; Germany	Adeline Gray; United States	Yasemin Adar; Turkey
2024 Paris	Yuka Kagami; Japan	Kennedy Blades; United States	Tatiana Rentería; Colombia
2024 Paris	Yuka Kagami; Japan	Kennedy Blades; United States	Milaimys Marín; Cuba
2028 Los Angeles			

== Discontinued events ==
=== Men ===
==== Light flyweight ====
- 47.6 kg: 1904
- 48 kg: 1972–1996

Games	Gold	Silver	Bronze
1904 St. Louis	Robert Curry; United States	John Hein; United States	Gustav Thiefenthaler (SUI); United States (Note: As Swiss Gustav Thiefenthaler (SUI) represented an American club, his participation and medals are attributed to the United States.)
1908–1968	not included in the Olympic program		
1972 Munich	Roman Dmitriev; Soviet Union	Ognyan Nikolov; Bulgaria	Ebrahim Javadi; Iran
1976 Montreal	Hasan Isaev; Bulgaria	Roman Dmitriev; Soviet Union	Akira Kudo; Japan
1980 Moscow	Claudio Pollio; Italy	Jang Se-hong; North Korea	Sergey Kornilaev; Soviet Union
1984 Los Angeles	Bobby Weaver; United States	Takashi Irie; Japan	Son Gab-do; South Korea
1988 Seoul	Takashi Kobayashi; Japan	Ivan Tzonov; Bulgaria	Sergei Karamchakov; Soviet Union
1992 Barcelona	Kim Il; North Korea	Kim Jong-shin; South Korea	Vugar Orujov; Unified Team
1996 Atlanta	Kim Il; North Korea	Armen Mkrtchyan; Armenia	Alexis Vila; Cuba

==== Flyweight ====
- 52.16 kg: 1904
- 52 kg: 1948–1996
- 54 kg: 2000

Games	Gold	Silver	Bronze
1904 St. Louis	George Mehnert; United States	Gustave Bauer; United States	William Nelson; United States
1908–1936	not included in the Olympic program		
1948 London	Lennart Viitala; Finland	Halit Balamir; Turkey	Thure Johansson; Sweden
1952 Helsinki	Hasan Gemici; Turkey	Yushu Kitano; Japan	Mahmoud Mollaghasemi; Iran
1956 Melbourne	Mirian Tsalkalamanidze; Soviet Union	Mohammad Ali Khojastehpour; Iran	Hüseyin Akbaş; Turkey
1960 Rome	Ahmet Bilek; Turkey	Masayuki Matsubara; Japan	Ebrahim Seifpour; Iran
1964 Tokyo	Yoshikatsu Yoshida; Japan	Chang Chang-Sun; South Korea	Ali Akbar Heidari; Iran
1968 Mexico City	Shigeo Nakata; Japan	Richard Sanders; United States	Chimedbazaryn Damdinsharav; Mongolia
1972 Munich	Kiyomi Kato; Japan	Arsen Alakhverdiev; Soviet Union	Kim Gwong-Hyong; North Korea
1976 Montreal	Yuji Takada; Japan	Alexander Ivanov; Soviet Union	Jeon Hae-Sup; South Korea
1980 Moscow	Anatoly Beloglazov; Soviet Union	Władysław Stecyk; Poland	Nermedin Selimov; Bulgaria
1984 Los Angeles	Šaban Trstena; Yugoslavia	Kim Jong-kyu; South Korea	Yuji Takada; Japan
1988 Seoul	Mitsuru Sato; Japan	Šaban Trstena; Yugoslavia	Vladimir Toguzov; Soviet Union
1992 Barcelona	Ri Hak-son; North Korea	Zeke Jones; United States	Valentin Yordanov; Bulgaria
1996 Atlanta	Valentin Yordanov; Bulgaria	Namig Abdullayev; Azerbaijan	Maulen Mamyrov; Kazakhstan
2000 Sydney	Namig Abdullayev; Azerbaijan	Sammie Henson; United States	Amiran Kardanov; Greece

==== Featherweight ====
- 61.33 kg: 1904
- 60.30 kg: 1908
- 61 kg: 1920–1936
- 63 kg: 1948–1968
- 62 kg: 1972–1996
- 63 kg: 2000
- 60 kg: 2004–2012

Games	Gold	Silver	Bronze
1904 St. Louis	Benjamin Bradshaw; United States	Theodore McLear; United States	Charles Clapper; United States
1908 London	George Dole; United States	James Slim; Great Britain	William McKie; Great Britain
1912 Stockholm	not included in the Olympic program		
1920 Antwerp	Charles Ackerly; United States	Samuel Gerson; United States	Bernard Bernard; Great Britain
1924 Paris	Robin Reed; United States	Chester Newton; United States	Katsutoshi Naito; Japan
1928 Amsterdam	Allie Morrison; United States	Kustaa Pihlajamäki; Finland	Hans Minder; Switzerland
1932 Los Angeles	Hermanni Pihlajamäki; Finland	Edgar Nemir; United States	Einar Karlsson; Sweden
1936 Berlin	Kustaa Pihlajamäki; Finland	Francis Millard; United States	Gösta Frändfors; Sweden
1948 London	Gazanfer Bilge; Turkey	Ivar Sjölin; Sweden	Adolf Müller; Switzerland
1952 Helsinki	Bayram Şit; Turkey	Nasser Givehchi; Iran	Josiah Henson; United States
1956 Melbourne	Shozo Sasahara; Japan	Joseph Mewis; Belgium	Erkki Penttilä; Finland
1960 Rome	Mustafa Dağıstanlı; Turkey	Stancho Kolev; Bulgaria	Vladimir Rubashvili; Soviet Union
1964 Tokyo	Osamu Watanabe; Japan	Stancho Kolev; Bulgaria	Nodar Khokhashvili; Soviet Union
1968 Mexico City	Masaaki Kaneko; Japan	Enyu Todorov; Bulgaria	Shamseddin Seyed-Abbasi; Iran
1972 Munich	Zagalav Abdulbekov; Soviet Union	Vehbi Akdağ; Turkey	Ivan Krastev; Bulgaria
1976 Montreal	Yang Jung-Mo; South Korea	Zevegiin Oidov; Mongolia	Gene Davis; United States
1980 Moscow	Magomedgasan Abushev; Soviet Union	Miho Dukov; Bulgaria	Georgios Hatziioannidis; Greece
1984 Los Angeles	Randall Lewis; United States	Kosei Akaishi; Japan	Lee Jung-Keun; South Korea
1988 Seoul	John Smith; United States	Stepan Sarkisyan; Soviet Union	Simeon Shterev; Bulgaria
1992 Barcelona	John Smith; United States	Askari Mohammadian; Iran	Lázaro Reinoso; Cuba
1996 Atlanta	Tom Brands; United States	Jang Jae-sung; South Korea	Elbrus Tedeyev; Ukraine
2000 Sydney	Murad Umakhanov; Russia	Serafim Barzakov; Bulgaria	Jang Jae-sung; South Korea
2004 Athens	Yandro Quintana; Cuba	Masoud Mostafa-Jokar; Iran	Kenji Inoue; Japan
2008 Beijing	Mavlet Batirov; Russia	Kenichi Yumoto; Japan	Morad Mohammadi; Iran
2008 Beijing	Mavlet Batirov; Russia	Kenichi Yumoto; Japan	Bazar Bazarguruev; Kyrgyzstan
2012 London	Toghrul Asgarov; Azerbaijan	Besik Kudukhov; Russia	Yogeshwar Dutt; India
2012 London	Toghrul Asgarov; Azerbaijan	Besik Kudukhov; Russia	Coleman Scott; United States

==== Light heavyweight ====
- 80 kg: 1920
- 87 kg: 1924–1960
- 97 kg: 1964–1968
- 90 kg: 1972–1996

Games	Gold	Silver	Bronze
1920 Antwerp	Anders Larsson; Sweden	Charles Courant; Switzerland	Walter Maurer; United States
1924 Paris	John Spellman; United States	Rudolf Svensson; Sweden	Charles Courant; Switzerland
1928 Amsterdam	Thure Sjöstedt; Sweden	Arnold Bögli; Switzerland	Henri Lefèbre; France
1932 Los Angeles	Peter Mehringer; United States	Thure Sjöstedt; Sweden	Eddie Scarf; Australia
1936 Berlin	Knut Fridell; Sweden	August Neo; Estonia	Erich Siebert; Germany
1948 London	Henry Wittenberg; United States	Fritz Stöckli; Switzerland	Bengt Fahlqvist; Sweden
1952 Helsinki	Viking Palm; Sweden	Henry Wittenberg; United States	Adil Atan; Turkey
1956 Melbourne	Gholamreza Takhti; Iran	Boris Kulayev; Soviet Union	Peter Blair; United States
1960 Rome	İsmet Atlı; Turkey	Gholamreza Takhti; Iran	Anatoly Albul; Soviet Union
1964 Tokyo	Aleksandr Medved; Soviet Union	Ahmet Ayık; Turkey	Said Mustafov; Bulgaria
1968 Mexico City	Ahmet Ayık; Turkey	Shota Lomidze; Soviet Union	József Csatári; Hungary
1972 Munich	Ben Peterson; United States	Gennadi Strakhov; Soviet Union	Károly Bajkó; Hungary
1976 Montreal	Levan Tediashvili; Soviet Union	Ben Peterson; United States	Stelică Morcov; Romania
1980 Moscow	Sanasar Oganisyan; Soviet Union	Uwe Neupert; East Germany	Aleksander Cichoń; Poland
1984 Los Angeles	Ed Banach; United States	Akira Ota; Japan	Noel Loban; Great Britain
1988 Seoul	Makharbek Khadartsev; Soviet Union	Akira Ota; Japan	Kim Tae-woo; South Korea
1992 Barcelona	Makharbek Khadartsev; Unified Team	Kenan Şimşek; Turkey	Chris Campbell; United States
1996 Atlanta	Rasoul Khadem; Iran	Makharbek Khadartsev; Russia	Eldar Kurtanidze; Georgia

== See also ==
- List of Asian Games medalists in wrestling
- List of World and Olympic Champions in men's freestyle wrestling

== Notes ==
Main notes

Subnotes
