= Wrestling at the 1904 Summer Olympics =

Wrestling at the Games of the III Olympiad
- Venue: Francis Olympic Field
- Dates: 14–15 October 1904
- No. of events: 7 (7 men, 0 women)
- Competitors: 43 from 5 nations

At the 1904 Summer Olympics, seven wrestling events were contested, all in the freestyle discipline. Then known as catch wrestling, it was the first time freestyle wrestling was featured at the Olympic Games, as the first Olympic wrestling contests in 1896 had been in the Greco-Roman style. Weight classes also made their first appearance. The sport continues to be in the Olympic program to the present day. The event also doubled as that year's Amateur Athletic Union (AAU) Catch Wrestling Championships.

Wrestling

== Medal summary ==
Games	Gold	Silver	Bronze
Light flyweight	Robert Curry; United States	John Hein; United States	Gustav Thiefenthaler (SUI); United States
Flyweight	George Mehnert; United States	Gustave Bauer; United States	William Nelson; United States
Bantamweight	Isidor Niflot; United States	August Wester; United States	Louis Strebler; United States
Featherweight	Benjamin Bradshaw; United States	Theodore McLear; United States	Charles Clapper; United States
Lightweight	Otto Roehm; United States	Rudolph Tesing; United States	Albert Zirkel; United States
Welterweight	Charles Ericksen (NOR); United States	William Beckman; United States	Jerry Winholtz; United States
Heavyweight	Bernhoff Hansen (NOR); United States	Frank Kugler (GER); United States	Fred Warmbold; United States

== Participating nations ==
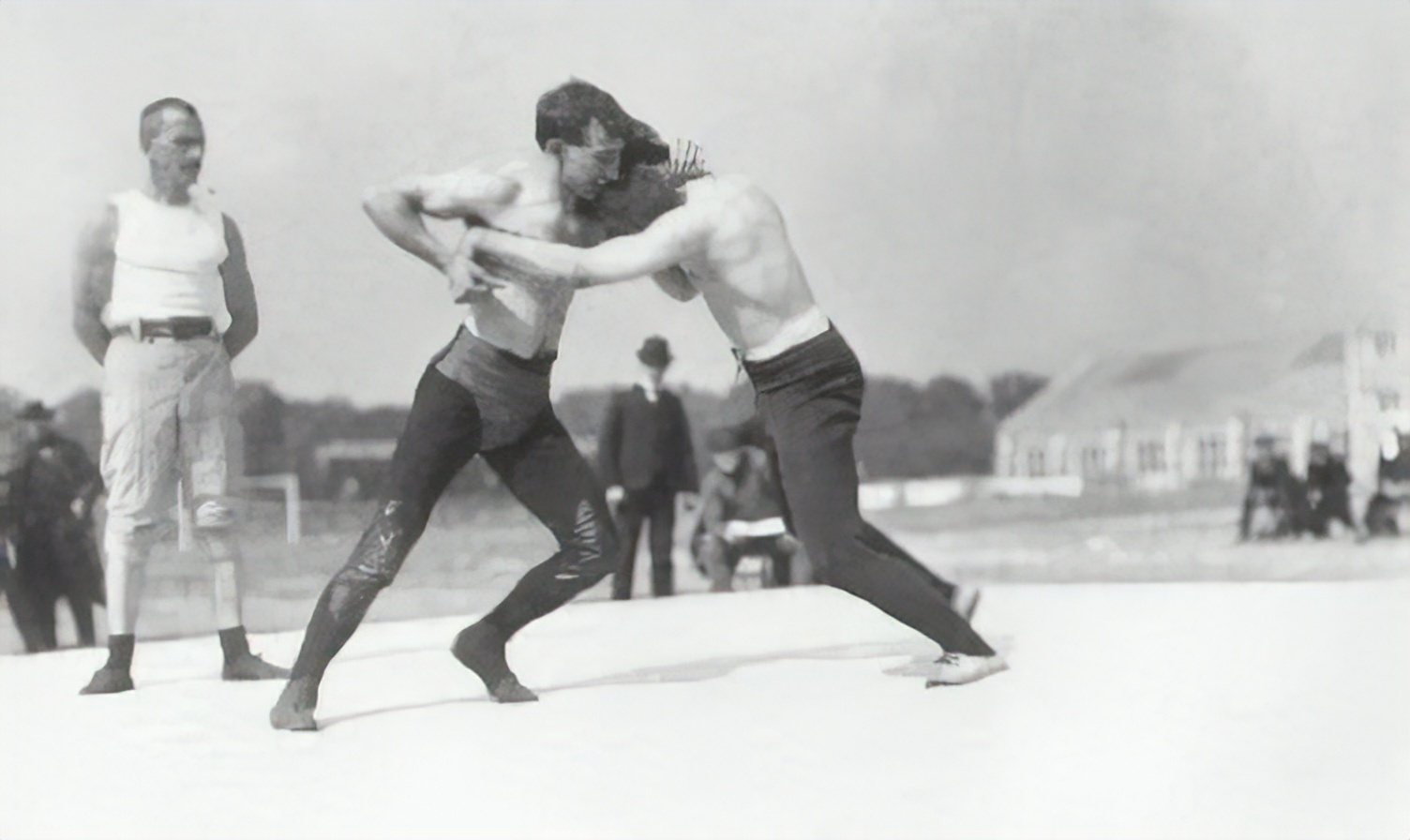
Wrestling match during 1904 Summer Olympics.

A total of 44 wrestlers competed at the St. Louis Games:

- United States (40)
- Germany (2)^{†}
- Norway (2)^{†}
- Canada (1)^{†}
- Switzerland (1)^{†}

^{†}As representatives of an American club, their participation and medals were attributed accordingly by the International Olympic Committee (IOC).

== Disputed country attribution ==
The nationalities of some medalists are disputed, as many American competitors were recent immigrants to the United States who had not yet been granted U.S. citizenship.

Since 2024, the IOC has considered the National Olympic Committee (NOC) affiliation of the club or team for which an athlete competed to be the decisive factor for the first three Olympic Games (1896–1904), attributing participation and medals accordingly.

=== German medalist ===
Multi-medalist Frank Kugler of Germany, a member of the St. Louis Southwest Turnverein team, won three individual medals (one silver in wrestling and two bronze medals in weightlifting) and was also part of the American St. Louis Southwest Turnverein tug of war team that won a bronze medal. He was granted U.S. citizenship in 1913. His silver medal in the freestyle heavyweight event is attributed to the United States.

=== Norwegian medalists ===
The International Olympic Committee originally considered Norwegian-American wrestlers Charles Ericksen and Bernhoff Hansen to have competed for the United States (both were Norwegian immigrants to the US); each won a gold medal. In 2012, Norwegian historians however found documentation showing that Ericksen did not receive American citizenship until March 22, 1905, and that Hansen, probably never received American citizenship. The historians have therefore petitioned to have the athletes registered as Norwegians. In May 2013, it was reported that the Norwegian Olympic Committee had filed a formal application for changing the nationality of the wrestlers in IOC's medal database. In July 2021, the IOC modified data in the official database, recognizing Ericksen and Hansen as having competed for Norway.

Both gold by the Norwegian athletes are attributed to the United States, as both, Ericksen and Hansen, competed for the American club Brooklyn Norwegier Turnverein.

=== Swiss medalist ===
Swiss-American wrestler Gustav Tiefenthaler was born in Switzerland, but the family moved to the United States when he was a child. He represented the South Broadway AC in St. Louis. At the Olympics, Tiefenthaler wrestled one bout and lost, but earned a bronze medal. His bronze medal in the freestyle light flyweight event is attributed to the United States.

== Medal table ==
Rank	Nation	Gold	Silver	Bronze	Total
1	United States	7	7	7	21
Totals (1 entries)		7	7	7	21
