= Norway at the Olympics =

- IOC code: NOR
- NOC: Norwegian Olympic Committee and Confederation of Sports
- Website: www.idrettsforbundet.no (in Norwegian)
- Medals Ranked 8th: Gold 229 Silver 199 Bronze 188 Total 616

Summer appearances
- 1900; 1904; 1908; 1912; 1920; 1924; 1928; 1932; 1936; 1948; 1952; 1956; 1960; 1964; 1968; 1972; 1976; 1980; 1984; 1988; 1992; 1996; 2000; 2004; 2008; 2012; 2016; 2020; 2024

Winter appearances
- 1924; 1928; 1932; 1936; 1948; 1952; 1956; 1960; 1964; 1968; 1972; 1976; 1980; 1984; 1988; 1992; 1994; 1998; 2002; 2006; 2010; 2014; 2018; 2022; 2026

Other related appearances
- 1906 Intercalated Games

Norway first participated at the Summer Olympic Games in 1900, and has sent athletes to compete in every Summer Games since then, except for the 1980 Summer Olympics in Moscow when they participated in the American-led boycott and, as previously thought, the 1904 Games in St. Louis, United States. However, at the beginning of the 21st century, it was discovered that wrestlers Charles Ericksen and Bernhoff Hansen, who were Norwegian expatriates in America whose medals at the 1904 Summer Olympics were previously attributed to United States, still held Norwegian citizenship at the time of the games. They won the gold medals in the wrestling welterweight and heavyweight events respectively.

Norwegian athletes have won a total of 169 medals at the Summer Olympics, with sailing and shooting as the top medal-producing sports. At the Winter Olympic Games, Norway has won 447 total medals including 166 gold medals, both considerably more than any other nation in Winter Olympic history. More than half of these medals have come from cross-country skiing and speed skating (it used to be half the disciplines). Norway is one of only three nations (along with Austria and Liechtenstein) to have won more medals at the Winter Games than at the Summer Games.

The National Olympic Committee for Norway was created and recognized in 1900.

== Disputed medals at the 1904 Summer Olympics ==
The International Olympic Committee originally considered Norwegian-American wrestlers Charles Ericksen and Bernhoff Hansen to have competed for the United States (both were Norwegian immigrants to the US); each won a gold medal. In 2012, Norwegian historians however found documentation showing that Ericksen did not receive American citizenship until March 22, 1905, and that Hansen, who was registered as an "alien" (foreigner) as late as 1925, probably never received American citizenship. The historians have therefore petitioned to have the athletes registered as Norwegians. In May 2013, it was reported that the Norwegian Olympic Committee had filed a formal application for changing the nationality of the wrestlers in IOC's medal database. In July 2021, the IOC modified data in the official database, recognizing Ericksen and Hansen as having competed for Norway.

Since 2024, the IOC has considered the National Olympic Committee (NOC) affiliation of the club or team for which an athlete competed to be the decisive factor for the first three Olympic Games (1896–1904), attributing participation and medals accordingly. In the case of Ericksen and Hansen, both medals are attributed to the United States, as both competed for the American club Brooklyn Norwegier Turnverein.

== Hosted Games ==
Norway has hosted the Games on two occasions.

Games	Host city	Dates	Nations	Participants	Events
1952 Winter Olympics	Oslo	14–25 February	30	694	22
1994 Winter Olympics	Lillehammer	12–27 February	67	1,737	61

== Medal tables ==
=== Medals by Summer Games ===
Games	Athletes	Gold	Silver	Bronze	Total	Rank
(French Third Republic) 1900 Paris	7	0	2	3	5	16
(United States) 1904 St. Louis	did not participate					
(United Kingdom) 1908 London	69	2	3	3	8	8
(Sweden) 1912 Stockholm	190	3	2	5	10	8
(Belgium) 1920 Antwerp	194	13	9	9	31	6
(French Third Republic) 1924 Paris	62	5	2	3	10	7
(Netherlands) 1928 Amsterdam	52	1	2	1	4	19
(United States) 1932 Los Angeles	5	0	0	0	0	–
(Nazi Germany) 1936 Berlin	70	1	3	2	6	18
(United Kingdom) 1948 London	81	1	3	3	7	19
(Finland) 1952 Helsinki	102	3	2	0	5	10
(Australia) 1956 Melbourne	22	1	0	2	3	22
(Italy) 1960 Rome	40	1	0	0	1	21
(Japan) 1964 Tokyo	26	0	0	0	0	–
1968 Mexico City	46	1	1	0	2	25
(West Germany) 1972 Munich	112	2	1	1	4	21
(Canada) 1976 Montreal	66	1	1	0	2	21
(Soviet Union) 1980 Moscow	boycotted					
(United States) 1984 Los Angeles	103	0	1	2	3	28
(South Korea) 1988 Seoul	70	2	3	0	5	21
(Spain) 1992 Barcelona	83	2	4	1	7	22
(United States) 1996 Atlanta	98	2	2	3	7	30
(Australia) 2000 Sydney	93	4	3	3	10	19
(Greece) 2004 Athens	52	5	0	1	6	17
(China) 2008 Beijing	85	3	5	1	9	22
(United Kingdom) 2012 London	66	2	1	1	4	35
(Brazil) 2016 Rio de Janeiro	62	0	0	4	4	74
(Japan) 2020 Tokyo	85	4	2	2	8	20
(France) 2024 Paris	107	4	1	3	8	18
(United States) 2028 Los Angeles	future event					
(Australia) 2032 Brisbane	future event					
Total (27/30)	2,048	63	53	53	169	21

Notes

- ^{NAT} Norwegian Charles Ericksen and Bernhoff Hansen competed at the 1904 Summer Olympics, winning gold medals in the welterweight and heavyweight wrestling events, respectively. As representatives of an American club, their participation and medals were attributed accordingly.
- ^{ART} Art competitions (1912–1948) are not included in the medal table above, as they were non-sports events formerly part of the Olympic Games. (Note: In 1952, art competition medals, as well as the gold medal awards for feats in alpinism and aeronautics, were removed from the official national medal counts. Only since 2021 have they been officially listed again by the IOC in the medal tables and respective NOC profile on its website.) Norway won its sole art competition medal, a silver, at the 1920 Summer Olympics.

=== Medals by Winter Games ===
Host country

Games	Athletes	Gold	Silver	Bronze	Total	Rank
(France) 1924 Chamonix	14	4	7	6	17	1
(Switzerland) 1928 St. Moritz	25	6	4	5	15	1
(United States) 1932 Lake Placid	19	3	4	3	10	2
(Nazi Germany) 1936 Garmisch-Partenkirchen	31	7	5	3	15	1
(Switzerland) 1948 St. Moritz	49	4	3	3	10	1
(Norway) 1952 Oslo	73	7	3	6	16	1
(Italy) 1956 Cortina d'Ampezzo	45	2	1	1	4	7
(United States) 1960 Squaw Valley	29	3	3	0	6	4
(Austria) 1964 Innsbruck	58	3	6	6	15	3
(France) 1968 Grenoble	65	6	6	2	14	1
(Japan) 1972 Sapporo	67	2	5	5	12	7
(Austria) 1976 Innsbruck	42	3	3	1	7	4
(United States) 1980 Lake Placid	64	1	3	6	10	8
(Socialist Federal Republic of Yugoslavia) 1984 Sarajevo	58	3	2	4	9	6
(Canada) 1988 Calgary	63	0	3	2	5	12
(France) 1992 Albertville	80	9	6	5	20	3
(Norway) 1994 Lillehammer	88	10	11	5	26	2
(Japan) 1998 Nagano	76	10	10	5	25	2
(United States) 2002 Salt Lake City	77	13	5	7	25	1
(Italy) 2006 Turin	69	2	8	9	19	13
(Canada) 2010 Vancouver	99	9	8	6	23	4
(Russia) 2014 Sochi	134	11	6	10	27	1
(South Korea) 2018 Pyeongchang	109	14	14	11	39	1
(China) 2022 Beijing	84	16	8	13	37	1
(Italy) 2026 Milano Cortina	80	18	12	11	41	1
(France) 2030 French Alps	future event					
(United States) 2034 Utah	future event					
Total (25/25)	1,598	166	146	135	447	1

=== Medals overall ===
Games	Gold	Silver	Bronze	Total	Rank
Summer Olympics	63	53	53	169	21
Winter Olympics	166	146	135	447	1
Total	229	199	188	616	8

=== Records ===
- The most gold and total medals in the history of the Winter Olympics (166 and 447)
- The most gold medals won in a single Winter Olympics (18 in 2026)
- The most total medals won in a single Winter Olympics (41 in 2026)

=== Medals by summer sport ===
Sport	Gold	Silver	Bronze	Total
Sailing	17	11	5	33
Shooting	13	8	11	32
Athletics	10	8	8	26
Canoeing	6	4	4	14
Rowing	3	7	8	18
Handball	3	2	3	8
Wrestling	2	2	3	7
Cycling	2	0	2	4
Weightlifting	2	0	0	2
Boxing	1	2	2	5
Gymnastics	1	2	1	4
Football	1	0	2	3
Beach volleyball	1	0	1	2
Triathlon	1	0	0	1
Taekwondo	0	2	0	2
Swimming	0	1	1	2
Equestrian	0	1	0	1
Fencing	0	1	0	1
Tennis	0	0	1	1
Totals (19 entries)	63	51	52	166

*This table does not include three medals – two silver and one bronze – awarded in the figure skating events at the 1920 Summer Olympics.

=== Medals by winter sport ===
Leading in that sport

Sport	Gold	Silver	Bronze	Total
Cross country skiing	59	45	39	143
Speed skating	29	31	31	91
Biathlon	25	23	17	65
Nordic combined	18	12	8	38
Ski jumping	14	12	15	41
Alpine skiing	11	15	16	42
Freestyle skiing	6	2	4	12
Figure skating	3	2	1	6
Curling	1	2	2	5
Snowboarding	0	4	1	5
Totals (10 entries)	166	148	134	448

*This table includes three medals – two silver and one bronze – awarded in the figure skating events at the 1920 Summer Olympics.

== Summary by sport ==
=== Athletics ===
Norway's Olympic debut in 1900 included two track and field athletes; Carl Albert Andersen won a bronze medal in the pole vault.

Games	Athletes	Events	Gold	Silver	Bronze	Total
1900 Paris	2	4/23	0	0	1	1
Total			9	6	8	23

=== Sailing ===
Norway made its sailing debut in 1908.

Games	No. Sailors	Events	Gold	Silver	Bronze	Total	Ranking
1896	Scheduled but event wasn't held						
1900	0	0/13	0	0	0	0	
1904	Not Scheduled						
1908	5	1/4	0	0	0	0	
1912	18	3/4	2	0	0	2	1
1916	Games Cancelled						
1920	59	11/14	7	3	1	11	1
1924	9	3/3	2	1	0	3	1
1928	10	3/3	1	1	0	2	1
1932	0	0/4	0	0	0	0	
1936	14	4/4	0	2	0	2	5
1940	Games Cancelled						
1944	Games Cancelled						
1948	13	4/5	1	0	0	1	3
1952	12	4/5	1	2	0	3	2
1956	6	2/5	0	0	0	0	
1960	9	4/5	1	0	0	1	4
1964	9	4/5	0	0	0	0	
1968	11	5/5	0	1	0	1	5
1972	13	6/6	0	0	0	0	
1976	6	3/6	0	0	0	0	
1980	0	0/6	0	0	0	0	
1984	7	4/7	0	0	0	0	
1988	7	4/8	0	1	0	1	9
1992	14	8/10	1	0	0	1	6
1996	8	5/10	0	0	1	1	19
2000	9	5/11	0	0	1	1	13
2004	8	5/11	1	0	0	1	8
2008	9	6/11	0	0	0	0	
2012	6	5/10	0	0	0	0	
2016	6	5/10	0	0	0	0	
2020	8	6/10	0	0	1	1	16
Total			17	11	4	32	3

=== Shooting ===
Norway made its shooting debut in 1900. Ole Østmo earned medals in two of the free rifle positions, contributing to an individual three-position bronze and a team silver.

Games	Shooters	Events	Gold	Silver	Bronze	Total
1900 Paris	5	5/9	0	2	2	4
Total			13	8	11	32

== Medals in art competitions ==
In addition to its accomplishments in sport, Norway has also earned recognition in Olympic art competitions—one of the three non-sports events once included in the Olympic Games. The country won its sole art competition medal, a silver, at the 1920 Summer Olympics. These events were part of the official Olympic program in seven Summer Games, from 1912 to 1948. In 1952, the International Olympic Committee (IOC) formally discontinued all non-sport events (including art competitions), as well as awards for feats (such as alpinism and aeronautics). These were subsequently removed from official national medal counts.

=== Medalists ===
Medal	Name	Games	Event	Piece
Silver	Holger Sinding-Larsen	(Belgium) 1920 Antwerp	Architecture	Project for a gymnastics school

== See also ==
- List of flag bearers for Norway at the Olympics
- Category:Olympic competitors for Norway
- Norway at the Paralympics
