= Ben Bradshaw (disambiguation) =

Ben Bradshaw (born 1960) is a British politician.

Ben or Benjamin Bradshaw may also refer to:

- Benjamin Bradshaw (1879–1960), American wrestler
- Ben Bradshaw (magician), Australian magician and escapologist
