= John Babcock (disambiguation) =

John Babcock (1900–2010) was the last known surviving veteran of the Canadian military to have served in the First World War.

John Babcock may also refer to:

- John C. Babcock (1836–1908), American amateur rower and Civil War secret service member
- John B. Babcock (1843–1909), Medal of Honor recipient
- John Babcock (wrestler) (1872–1936), American Olympic wrestler
