= William Tagg (wrestler) =

British wrestler

Personal information
- Nationality: British (English)
- Born: 19 November 1887 Bermondsey, London, England
- Died: 27 February 1962 (aged 74) Peacehaven, England

Sport
- Sport: Wrestling
- Club: Apollo AWC, Hackney

William Graves Tagg (19 November 1887 – 27 February 1962) was a British wrestler who competed at the 1908 Summer Olympics.

== Biography ==
Tagg was a member of the Apollo Amateur Wrestling Club, based in Hackney, London.

He represented the Great British team at the 1908 Olympic Games, in London, England, where he participated in the men's freestyle featherweight category, losing to William McKie in the bronze medal play-off bout.

By profession Tagg was an upholsterer and furniture maker.
