= Robert Curry (wrestler) =

American wrestler (1882–1944)

Personal information
- Full name: Robert Samuel Curry
- Born: August 14, 1882 New York, New York, U.S.
- Died: November 12, 1944 (aged 62) New York, New York, U.S.
Medal record
Men's freestyle wrestling
Representing the United States
Olympic Games
| Gold medal – first place | 1904 St. Louis | Light flyweight |

Robert "Bob" Samuel Curry (August 14, 1882 – November 12, 1944) was an American wrestler of the early twentieth century.

In 1903, the National Wrestling Championships were held in the gymnasium of the New Polo Athletic Association at One Hundred and Twenty Ninth Street and Park Avenue, New York. Curry won the 105 pounds championship by defeating Gustave Bauer representing the National Turn Verein club in the final in 17 seconds. Bauer subsequently won a silver medal at the 1904 St. Louis Olympic Games in the Flyweight (up to 55 kg/121.25 lb.) division.

He represented the St. George's Athletic Club and won the supplementary championship wrestling competitions of the Metropolitan Association of the Amateur Athletic Union. The competition was held from Thursday, March 24, 1904 and culminated with the final held on the evening of Saturday, March 26, 1904 in the gymnasium of the St. Bartholomew's Athletic Club, East Forty-second Street, New York City. He won his final bout in the 105 pound class, by throwing F. Priester of the Grace Athletic Club. The bout lasted 3 minutes and 24 seconds. Following the competition he was named as one of a team of six wrestlers to represent in the St. Louis Olympics in the summer of 1904.

He won the gold medal in the 1904 Summer Olympics (St Louis) for freestyle wrestling in the 47.6 kg (light-flyweight) class for men by winning both of his matches by falls. The tournament was held at Francis Field, Washington University beginning on October 14, 1904 and finishing on October 15, 1904 in the form of a single elimination tournament. John Hein representing United States took the silver medal, and Gustav Thiefenthaler representing Switzerland took the bronze.
