= Edward Babcock =

Edward Babcock may refer to:

- Edward Babcock (wrestler) (1872–1936), American Olympic wrestler
- Edward V. Babcock (1864–1948), mayor of Pittsburgh
- Edward Chester Babcock (1913–1990), better known as Jimmy Van Heusen, American composer
