= Norway at the 1904 Summer Olympics =

- IOC code: NOR
- NOC: Central Association for the Dissemination of Sports

in St. Louis
- Competitors: 3 in 3 sports
- Medals: Gold 0 Silver 0 Bronze 0 Total 0

Summer Olympics appearances (overview)
- 1900; ~~1904~~; 1908; 1912; 1920; 1924; 1928; 1932; 1936; 1948; 1952; 1956; 1960; 1964; 1968; 1972; 1976; 1980; 1984; 1988; 1992; 1996; 2000; 2004; 2008; 2012; 2016; 2020; 2024; 2028

Other related appearances
- 1906 Intercalated Games

Norway did not send a team to the 1904 Summer Olympics in St. Louis, United States. However, several Norwegian immigrants in the United States took part in the competitions while representing American clubs. Charles Ericksen and Bernhoff Hansen competed in the wrestling welterweight and heavyweight events, respectively, and both won gold medals.

Another Norwegian-born athlete was Oscar Olsen, who was born in Oslo and came to the United States as a youth in the early 1880s. A longtime member of the Sleipner Athletic Club in Chicago, also known as the Norwegian-American Athletic Association, Olsen represented the Milwaukee Athletic Club on its winning tug-of-war team at the 1904 Olympics; all members of the team, including Olsen, were from Chicago. Olsen also placed fourth in the two-handed weightlifting event. He was naturalized as an American citizen in 1942 and remained in Chicago until his death in 1962, at the age of 86.

== Disputed country attribution ==
The International Olympic Committee (IOC) originally considered Norwegian-American wrestlers Charles Ericksen and Bernhoff Hansen to have competed for the United States at the 1904 Summer Olympics (both were Norwegian immigrants to the US); each won a gold medal. In 2012, Norwegian historians however found documentation showing that Ericksen did not receive American citizenship until March 22, 1905, and that Hansen, who was registered as an "alien" (foreigner) as late as 1925, probably never received American citizenship. The historians have therefore petitioned to have the athletes registered as Norwegians. In May 2013, it was reported that the Norwegian Olympic Committee had filed a formal application for changing the nationality of the wrestlers in IOC's medal database. In July 2021, the IOC modified data in the official database, recognizing Ericksen and Hansen as having competed for Norway.

Since 2024, the IOC has considered the National Olympic Committee (NOC) affiliation of the club or team for which an athlete competed to be the decisive factor for the first three Olympic Games (1896–1904), attributing participation and medals accordingly. In the case of Ericksen and Hansen, both medals are attributed to the United States, as both competed for the American club Brooklyn Norwegier Turnverein.

== Reallocated medalists ==
Medal	Name	Sport	Event	Date	Reallocated to
Gold	Oscar Olsen	Tug of war	Men's Tug of war	September 1	no reallocation^{†}
Gold	Charles Ericksen	Wrestling	Men's freestyle welterweight	October 15	United States
Gold	Bernhoff Hansen	Wrestling	Men's freestyle heavyweight	October 15	United States

^{†} The team medal in tug of war was attributed to the US team from the very beginning.
