= John Hein =

John Hein may refer to:

- John Hein (editor), publisher and former editor of ScotsGay
- John Hein (wrestler) (1886–1963), American wrestler

== See also ==
- Jon Hein, American radio personality and former webmaster
