= Warmbold =

Warmbold is a German surname. Notable people with the surname include:

- Achim Warmbold (born 1941), German rally driver
- Antony Warmbold (born 1978), German rally driver
- Fred Warmbold (1875–1926), American wrestler
- Hermann Warmbold (1876–1976), German politician
