= George Dole (wrestler) =

American wrestler (1885–1928)

Personal information
- Full name: George Stuart Dole
- Born: January 30, 1885 Ypsilanti, Michigan, U.S.
- Died: September 6, 1928 (aged 43) Winthrop, Maine, U.S.
- Home town: Bath, Maine, U.S.

Sport
- Country: United States
- Sport: Wrestling
- Events: Freestyle and Folkstyle
- College team: Yale
- Team: USA
Medal record
Men's freestyle wrestling
Representing the United States
Olympic Games
Gold medal – first place	1908 London	Featherweight

George Stuart Dole (January 30, 1885 – September 6, 1928) was an American wrestler who competed in the 1908 Summer Olympics. In 1908, he won the gold medal in the freestyle featherweight class.

== Early life ==
Dole was a Swedenborgian, who moved to Maine after his father was called as rector of that denomination's church in Bath, Maine. George was an identical twin, and without the markings on the back, it is impossible to tell the difference between him and brother Louis.

He wrestled and attended college at Yale University with his identical twin brother Louis. He was the sole four-time EIWA champion in its first 74 years. George won two AAU national titles, including a 1907 pin of George Mehnert at 125, the 2-time Olympic champion’s only career loss. Dole beat out twin brothers Louis and Mehnert for honors as the College Wrestler of the Decade, 1901-1910, by Amateur Wrestling News. In 1907, George received Yale Wrestling’s “Y Award” in the first presentation other than to major sports (track, crew, football, baseball).

== Olympics ==
The Dole family story says that the brothers flipped a coin to see which would go to the Olympics. Louis won but got sick, so George went in his place. At the 1908 Olympics in London, he was the lone American in his weight class, competing against eleven Englishmen. No other country was represented. He advanced through three preliminary bouts and won the best-of-three falls final in only two bouts.

== Later life ==
He coached at Yale and at various prep schools until 1917 when he joined the military. He was a World War I sub-chaser commander and earned the Navy Cross during his service. George was an economics professor at St. Lawrence University, until dying of a heart failure in 1928.

In 1997, Dole was inducted into the National Wrestling Hall of Fame as a Distinguished Member.
