= Wrestling at the 1904 Summer Olympics – Men's freestyle lightweight =

Men's lightweight freestyle wrestling at the Games of the III Olympiad
- Venue: Francis Field
- Date: October 15, 1904
- Competitors: 10 from 2 nations

Medalists
1st place, gold medalist(s)		Otto Roehm	United States
2nd place, silver medalist(s)		Rudolph Tesiny	United States
3rd place, bronze medalist(s)		Albert Zirkel	United States

The lightweight was the third heaviest freestyle wrestling weight class held as part of the wrestling programme at the 1904 Summer Olympics. It included wrestlers weighing 135 to 145 pounds (61.2 to 65.8 kg). It was the first time the event, like all other freestyle wrestling events, was held in Olympic competition. Ten wrestlers competed.

== Results ==
First Round
Otto Roehm (USA)
Fred Koenig (USA)
Decision
Fred Huseman (USA)
Jerry Winholtz (USA)

Quarter-finals
Fall (11:51)
Otto Roehm (USA)
Fred Huseman (USA)
Fall (4:10)
Albert Zirkel (USA)
Charles Haberkorn (USA)
Decision
Rudolph Wolken (GER)
Rudolph Tesiny (USA)
Decision (9:00)
William Hennessy (USA)
Charles Eng (USA)

Semi-finals
Otto Roehm (USA)
Albert Zirkel (USA) (bronze)
Decision (9:00)
Rudolph Tesiny (USA)
William Hennessy (USA)

Final
Decision (15:00)
Otto Roehm (USA) (gold)
Rudolph Tesiny (USA) (silver)

== Sources ==
- Wudarski, Pawel (1999). "Wyniki Igrzysk Olimpijskich" (in Polish).
