= William Beckman =

American wrestler (1881–1933)

Personal information
- Born: May 12, 1881 New York, New York, U.S.
- Died: June 14, 1933 (aged 52) Queens, New York, U.S.
Medal record
Men's freestyle wrestling
Representing the United States
Olympic Games
Silver medal – second place	1904 St. Louis	Welterweight

William Beckman (May 12, 1881 – June 14, 1933) was an American wrestler who competed in the 1904 Summer Olympics. In 1904, he won the silver medal in the freestyle welterweight competition. Beckmann was born in New York City.
