= Wrestling at the 1904 Summer Olympics – Men's freestyle light flyweight =

Men's light flyweight freestyle wrestling at the Games of the III Olympiad
- Venue: Francis Field
- Date: October 15, 1904
- Competitors: 4 from 2 nations

Medalists
1st place, gold medalist(s)		Robert Curry	United States
2nd place, silver medalist(s)		John Hein	United States
3rd place, bronze medalist(s)		Gustav Thiefenthaler	Switzerland

The light flyweight was the lightest freestyle wrestling weight class held as part of the wrestling programme at the 1904 Summer Olympics. It included wrestlers weighing up to 105 pounds (47.6 kg). It was the first time the event, like all other freestyle wrestling events, was held in Olympic competition. Four wrestlers competed.

== Results ==
First Round
Fall (1:04)
Robert Curry (USA)
Gustav Thiefenthaler (SUI) (bronze)
Fall (4:05)
John Hein (USA)
Claude Holgate (USA)

Final
Fall (2:38)
Robert Curry (USA) (gold)
John Hein (USA) (silver)

== Sources ==
- Wudarski, Pawel (1999). "Wyniki Igrzysk Olimpijskich" (in Polish).
