= John Slim (wrestler) =

British wrestler (1885–1966)

Olympic medal record

Men's freestyle wrestling

Representing Great Britain

Olympic Games
Silver medal – second place	1908 London	Featherweight

John Percival Slim (9 January 1885 – 14 March 1966) was a British wrestler who competed in the 1908 Summer Olympics. In 1908, at the 1908 Summer Olympics, he won the silver medal in the freestyle wrestling featherweight class.

Slim was a two-times winner of the British Wrestling Championships in 1905 and 1907.
