= Wrestling at the 1904 Summer Olympics – Men's freestyle featherweight =

Men's featherweight freestyle wrestling at the Games of the III Olympiad
- Venue: Francis Field
- Date: October 15, 1904
- Competitors: 9 from 3 nations

Medalists
1st place, gold medalist(s)		Benjamin Bradshaw	United States
2nd place, silver medalist(s)		Theodore McLear	United States
3rd place, bronze medalist(s)		Charles Clapper	United States

The featherweight was the middle of seven freestyle wrestling weight class held as part of the wrestling programme at the 1904 Summer Olympics. It included wrestlers weighing 125 to 135 pounds (56.7 to 61.2 kg). It was the first time the event, like all other freestyle wrestling events, was held in Olympic competition. Nine wrestlers competed.

== Results ==
Charles Clapper and Frederick Ferguson were allowed to fight for the bronze medal as they both lost in this tournament against the gold medalist Benjamin Bradshaw.

First Round
Edward Babcock (USA)
Theo Koppen (USA)

Quarter-finals
Fall (5:06)
Edward Babcock (USA)
Charles Clapper (USA)
Fall (1:38)
Benjamin Bradshaw (USA)
Frederick Ferguson (CAN)
Fall (0:37)
Theodore McLear (USA)
Louis Strebler (USA)
Fall (1:56)
Dietrich Wortmann (GER)
Max Miller (USA)

Semi-finals
Fall (0:59)
Charles Clapper (USA)
Benjamin Bradshaw (USA)
Fall (1:02)
Theodore McLear (USA)
Dietrich Wortmann (GER)

Final
Decision (15:00)
Benjamin Bradshaw (USA) (gold)
Theodore McLear (USA) (silver)
Third place
Fall (0:54)
Charles Clapper (USA) (bronze)
Frederick Ferguson (CAN)

== Sources ==
- Wudarski, Pawel (1999). "Wyniki Igrzysk Olimpijskich" (in Polish).
