= Charles Haberkorn =

American sport wrestler

Personal information
- Born: Karl Haberkorn; November 16, 1880 (Note: Some sources incorrectly give his birth date as March 31, 1874.) Kingdom of Württemberg
- Died: November 26, 1966 (aged 86) St Louis, Missouri

Sport
- Sport: tug of war
Medal record
Men's Tug of war
Representing Mixed team
Olympic Games
Bronze medal – third place	1904 St. Louis	Team competition

Charles Haberkorn (born Karl Haberkorn; November 16, 1880 – November 26, 1966), later Habercorn, was a German-American tug of war competitor and wrestler who participated in both sports in the 1904 Summer Olympics.

In the 1904 Olympics, he won a bronze medal as a member of Southwest Turnverein of Saint Louis No. 2 team, which is officially considered a mixed team.

As a wrestler, he competed in the freestyle lightweight category and was eliminated in the quarterfinals. He was born in Württemberg, Germany and died in St. Louis, Missouri.

Haberkorn was born in the Kingdom of Württemberg and immigrated to St. Louis in 1894 with his family. He became a U.S. citizen in 1911.

He died in November 1966, two days after being severely burned in an accident trying to light his gas oven.
