= Dietrich Wortmann =

German wrestler (1884–1952)

Personal information
- Nationality: German
- Born: 11 January 1884 Leipzig, Germany
- Died: 21 September 1952 (aged 68) Queens, New York, United States

Sport
- Sport: Wrestling
- Club: German-American Athletic Club (GAAC); President since 1910

Dietrich Wortmann (11 January 1884 – 21 September 1952) was a German wrestler. He competed in the men's freestyle featherweight at the 1904 Summer Olympics.
