= William McKie (wrestler) =

British wrestler (1884–1956)

Olympic medal record

Men's freestyle wrestling

Representing Great Britain

Olympic Games
Bronze medal – third place	1908 London	Featherweight

William McKie (27 December 1884 – 27 March 1956) was a British wrestler who competed in the 1908 Summer Olympics. In 1908, at the 1908 Summer Olympics, he won the bronze medal in the freestyle wrestling featherweight class.
