= Otto Roehm =

American wrestler (1882–1958)

Personal information
- Full name: Otto Frederick Roehm
- Born: August 2, 1882 Hamilton, Ontario, Canada
- Died: April 29, 1958 (aged 75) Cheektowaga, New York, U.S.
- Home town: Buffalo, New York, U.S.
Medal record
Men's freestyle wrestling
Representing the United States
Olympic Games
Gold medal – first place	1904 St. Louis	Lightweight

Otto Frederick Roehm (August 2, 1882 – April 29, 1958) was an American wrestler who competed in the 1904 Summer Olympics. Roehm became a U.S. citizen in 1888. At the 1904 Olympic Games, Roehm won a gold medal in lightweight category and also wrestled in the welterweight category, losing to William Beckmann in the semifinals.
