= Charles Clapper =

American wrestler

Personal information
- Born: December 20, 1875 Memphis, Missouri, U.S.
- Died: September 14, 1937 (aged 61) Chicago, Illinois, U.S.
Medal record
Men's freestyle wrestling
Representing the United States
Olympic Games
Bronze medal – third place	1904 St. Louis	Featherweight

Charles Ellis Clapper (December 20, 1875 – September 14, 1937) was an American wrestler who competed in the 1904 Summer Olympics. In 1904, he won a bronze medal in featherweight category. He was born in Memphis, Missouri and died in Chicago, Illinois.
