= Jerry Winholtz =

American wrestler

Personal information
- Full name: Jerry Elmer Winholtz
- Born: August 5, 1874 Mount Pleasant, Iowa, U.S.
- Died: June 16, 1962 (aged 87)
Medal record
Men's freestyle wrestling
Representing the United States
Olympic Games
Bronze medal – third place	1904 St. Louis	Welterweight

Jerry Elmer Winholtz (August 5, 1874 – June 16, 1962) was an American wrestler who competed in the 1904 Summer Olympics. At the 1904 Olympics, he competed in two different weight classes. In the lightweight class, he lost his first match to Fred Hussman. He then won a bronze medal in welterweight class.
