= Theodore McLear =

American wrestler

Personal information
- Born: June 29, 1879 Newark, New Jersey, U.S.
- Died: April 1958 (aged 78–79)
Medal record
Men's freestyle wrestling
Representing the United States
Olympic Games
Silver medal – second place	1904 St. Louis	Featherweight

Theodore J. McLear (June 29, 1879 – April 1958) was an American wrestler who competed in the 1904 Summer Olympics. In 1904, he won a silver medal in featherweight category. He was born in Newark, New Jersey.
