= Bernhoff Hansen =

Norwegian wrestler

Personal information
- Full name: Bernhoff Otelius Hansen
- Born: August 17, 1877 Rognan, Norway
- Died: December 22, 1950 (aged 73) New York, New York, U.S.
Medal record
Men's freestyle wrestling
Representing United States
Olympic Games
Gold medal – first place	1904 St. Louis	Heavyweight

Bernhoff Otelius Hansen (August 17, 1877 – December 22, 1950) was a Norwegian-American wrestler who competed in the 1904 Summer Olympics.

He was born in Rognan in Saltdal Municipality, Norway. Originally, he was a wrestler in Nordland, but one and a half years before the 1904 Olympic Games, he left Norway for the United States.

Norway did not send a team to the 1904 Summer Olympics in St. Louis. However, like his Norwegian compatriot Charles Ericksen, Hansen was affiliated with the Brooklyn-based 'Norwegian Turnverein', agymnastic club in New York, which sponsored his participation in the 1904 Olympics. He won the gold medal in the freestyle heavyweight event by winning all his three matches by fall. The Olympic tournament also served as the AAU Wrestling Championships. Hansen successfully defended his AAU heavyweight title in 1905, his only other U.S. championship.

His first name was spelled "Bernhoff" by FILA and in an article by The New York Times from January 16, 1918. By the time of the article, he was referred to as a "Norwegian light-heavyweight wrestler". Hansen died in New York City at the age of 73.

== Disputed country attribution ==
In 2012, Norwegian historians uncovered documentation showing that Hansen as still registered as an "alien" (foreigner) in 1925, questioning whether he had ever acquired American citizenship. The historians thus petitioned to have Hansen's gold registered as Norwegian.

Since 2024, the IOC has considered the National Olympic Committee (NOC) affiliation of the club or team for which an athlete competed to be the decisive factor for the first three Olympic Games (1896–1904), attributing participation and medals accordingly. Consequently, Hansen's gold medal in the freestyle heavyweight event, as well as Charles Ericksen's gold medal in the freestyle welterweight event at 1904 Olympics, are officially attributed to the United States, as both wrestlers represented the American club 'Brooklyn Norwegian Turnverein'.
