= Wrestling at the 1908 Summer Olympics – Men's freestyle featherweight =

Men's featherweight freestyle wrestling at the Games of the IV Olympiad
- Venue: White City Stadium
- Date: July 22
- Competitors: 12 from 2 nations

Medalists
1st place, gold medalist(s)		George Dole	United States
2nd place, silver medalist(s)		James Slim	Great Britain
3rd place, bronze medalist(s)		William McKie	Great Britain

The freestyle featherweight was one of five freestyle wrestling weight classes contested on the Wrestling at the 1908 Summer Olympics programme. Like all other wrestling events, it was open only to men. The featherweight was the second-lightest class, allowing wrestlers of up to 60.3 kilograms (133 lb). Each nation could enter up to 12 wrestlers.

11 British athletes and 1 American participated.

== Competition format ==
The event was a single-elimination tournament with a bronze medal match between the semifinal losers. The final and bronze medal match were best two-of-three, while all other rounds were a single bout. Bouts were 15 minutes, unless one wrestler lost by fall (two shoulders on the ground at the same time). Other than falls, decisions were made by the judges or, if they did not agree, the referee.

Wrestlers could "take hold how and where they please[d]" except that "hair, flesh, ears, private parts, or clothes may not be seized"; striking, scratching, twisting fingers, butting, and kicking were prohibited. Holds "obtained that the fear of breakage or dislocation of a limb shall induce a wrestler to give the fall" were outlawed, and particularly the double-nelson, hammerlock, strangle, half-strangle, scissors, hang, flying mare with palm uppermost, and the foot twist.

== Results ==
=== Standings ===
Place	Wrestler	Nation
1	George Dole	United States of America
2	James Slim	Great Britain
3	William McKie	Great Britain
4	William Tagg	Great Britain
5	Alfred Goddard	Great Britain
5	Sidney Peake	Great Britain
5	James Webster	Great Britain
5	Joseph White	Great Britain
9	Walter Adams	Great Britain
9	Percy Cockings	Great Britain
9	Risdon Couch	Great Britain
9	William Jones	Great Britain

=== Bracket ===
First Round
Decision
George Dole (USA)
Percy Cockings (GBR)
Fall (2:14)
James Webster (GBR)
Walter Adams (GBR)
Fall (11:56)
Joseph White (GBR)
William Jones (GBR)
Fall (10:48)
Alfred Goddard (GBR)
Risdon Couch (GBR)

Quarter-finals
Decision
George Dole (USA)
James Webster (GBR)
Decision
Joseph White (GBR)
William McKie (GBR)
Fall (5:00)
Alfred Goddard (GBR)
William Tagg (GBR)
Fall (9:00)
James Slim (GBR)
Sidney Peake (GBR)

Semi-finals
Fall (6:00)
George Dole (USA)
William McKie (GBR)
Decision
William Tagg (GBR)
James Slim (GBR)

Final
2–0 (fall (9:28)/decision)
George Dole (USA) (gold)
James Slim (GBR) (silver)
Third place
1–0 (decision/retired)
William McKie (GBR) (bronze)
William Tagg (GBR)

== Sources ==
- Cook, Theodore Andrea (1908). The Fourth Olympiad, Being the Official Report. London: British Olympic Association.
- De Wael, Herman (2001). "Freestyle Wrestling 1908". Herman's Full Olympians.
