= Albert Zirkel =

American wrestler

Personal information
- Full name: Albert Conrad Zirkel
- Born: October 23, 1884 Newark, New Jersey, U.S.
- Died: February 3, 1945 (aged 60) Newark, New Jersey, U.S.
Medal record
Men's freestyle wrestling
Representing the United States
Olympic Games
Bronze medal – third place	1904 St. Louis	Lightweight

Albert Conrad Zirkel (October 23, 1884 – February 3, 1945) was an American wrestler who competed in the 1904 Summer Olympics. In 1904, he won a bronze medal in lightweight category. He was born in Newark, New Jersey.
