= Rudolph Tesing =

American wrestler

Rudolph Tesiny
Personal information
- Born: February 4, 1881 New York, New York, U.S.
- Died: April 29, 1926 (aged 45) Staten Island, New York, U.S.
Medal record
Men's freestyle wrestling
Representing the United States
Olympic Games
Silver medal – second place	1904 St. Louis	Lightweight

Rudolph Tesiny (February 4, 1881 – April 29, 1926) was an American wrestler who competed in the 1904 Summer Olympics. In 1904, he won a silver medal in lightweight category. He was born in New York, New York.
