= Ben Bradshaw (magician) =

Australian magician

Ben Bradshaw is an Australian magician who has Guinness World Records for Straitjacket timing. He is also an entrepreneur and author in search engine optimisation and digital marketing. He is the author of “Don't Guess!” a book about online marketing strategy. Bradshaw is the CEO and founder of SponsoredLinX based in Brisbane, Australia. He has appeared on the Sky Business channel as a technology analyst and is a regular on the Australian business speaking circuit.

== Awards ==
Bradshaw holds two Guinness World Records, fastest time out of a straitjacket and fastest time out of a straitjacket underwater. In 2010 he won The BRW 2010 Fast Starter Award and The Smart Company Award. In 2013 he was awarded the Australian Ernst & Young Entrepreneur Of The Year Northern Region Award in the Emerging category.
