= Charles Ericksen =

Norwegian-American wrestler

Personal information
- Full name: Karl Fredrik Eriksen
- Born: June 20, 1875 Tønsberg, Norway
- Died: February 24, 1916 (aged 40) New York, New York, U.S.
Medal record
Men's freestyle wrestling
Representing United States
Olympic Games
Gold medal – first place	1904 St. Louis	Welterweight

Karl Fredrik "Charles" Ericksen (June 20, 1875 – February 24, 1916) was a Norwegian-American wrestler who competed in the 1904 Summer Olympics for the United States.

Norway did not send a team to the 1904 Summer Olympics in St. Louis. However, like his Norwegian compatriot Bernhoff Hansen, Ericksen was affiliated with the Brooklyn-based 'Norwegian Turnverein', a gymnastic club in New York, which sponsored his participation in the 1904 Olympics. He won the gold medal in the freestyle welterweight event, representing an American team.

== Disputed country attribution ==
In 2012, Norwegian historians uncovered documentation showing that Ericksen did not receive American citizenship until 22 March 1905. The historians thus petitioned to have Ericksen's gold registered as Norwegian, against his wishes.

Since 2024, the IOC has considered the National Olympic Committee (NOC) affiliation of the club or team for which an athlete competed to be the decisive factor for the first three Olympic Games (1896–1904), attributing participation and medals accordingly. Consequently, Ericksen's gold medal in the freestyle welterweight event, as well as Bernhoff Hansen's gold medal in the freestyle heavyweight event at 1904 Olympics, are officially attributed to the United States, as both wrestlers represented the American club 'Brooklyn Norwegian Turnverein'.
