= Gustav Tiefenthaler =

Swiss-American wrestler

Personal information
- Full name: Gustav Gotthardt Tiefenthaler
- Born: July 25, 1886 Unterwalden, Switzerland
- Died: April 14, 1942 (aged 55) St. Louis, Missouri, U.S.
Medal record
Men's freestyle wrestling
Representing United States
Olympic Games
Bronze medal – third place	1904 St. Louis	Light flyweight

Gustav Gotthardt Tiefenthaler (July 25, 1886 – April 14, 1942) was a Swiss-American wrestler who competed in the 1904 Summer Olympics. In 1904, he won a bronze medal in light flyweight category. He was born in Switzerland and died in St. Louis, Missouri.
