= Fred Warmbold =

American wrestler (1875–1926)

Personal information
- Full name: Fred Charles Warmbold
- Born: September 18, 1875 St. Louis, Missouri, U.S.
- Died: August 19, 1926 (aged 50) St. Louis, Missouri, U.S.
Medal record
Men's freestyle wrestling
Representing the United States
Olympic Games
Bronze medal – third place	1904 St. Louis	Heavyweight

Fred Charles Warmbold (September 18, 1875 – August 19, 1926) was an American wrestler who competed in the 1904 Summer Olympics. In 1904, he won a bronze medal in the heavyweight division. He was born and died in St. Louis, Missouri.
