= Benjamin Bradshaw =

American wrestler (1879–1960)

Personal information
- Born: August 15, 1879 Brooklyn, New York, U.S.
- Died: April 19, 1960 (aged 80)
Medal record
Men's freestyle wrestling
Representing the United States
Olympic Games
Gold medal – first place	1904 St. Louis	Featherweight

Benjamin Joseph Bradshaw (August 15, 1879 – April 19, 1960) was an American wrestler who competed in the 1904 Summer Olympics and won a gold medal in featherweight category. Bradshaw won AAU national championships in 1903, 1904 and 1907. Following his competitive wrestling career, he worked as a printer and tournament referee. Bradshaw would also coach wrestling at the Boys Club of New York in the 1920s and 1930s.
