= Edward Babcock (wrestler) =

American wrestler

Personal information
- Born: January 10, 1872 Cedar Rapids, Iowa, U.S.
- Died: June 28, 1936 (aged 64) Manteno, Illinois, U.S.

Sport
- Sport: Wrestling
- Event: Freestyle

Edward Caleb Babcock (January 10, 1872 – June 28, 1936) was an American wrestler. He competed in the men's freestyle featherweight at the 1904 Summer Olympics.
