= Wrestling at the 1904 Summer Olympics – Men's freestyle welterweight =

Men's welterweight freestyle wrestling at the Games of the III Olympiad
- Venue: Francis Field
- Date: October 15, 1904
- Competitors: 10 from 2 nations

Medalists
1st place, gold medalist(s)		Charles Ericksen	United States
2nd place, silver medalist(s)		William Beckman	United States
3rd place, bronze medalist(s)		Jerry Winholtz	United States

The welterweight was the second-heaviest freestyle wrestling weight class held as part of the wrestling programme at the 1904 Summer Olympics. It included wrestlers weighing 145 to 158 pounds (65.8 to 71.7 kg). It was the first time the event, like all other freestyle wrestling events, was held in Olympic competition. Ten wrestlers competed.

== Results ==
Jerry Winholtz and William Hennessy wrestled for the bronze medal after losing in this tournament against the gold medalist Charles Ericksen.

First Round
Fall (4:59)
William Schaefer (USA)
Albert Bechestobill (USA)
Fall (2:04)
William Beckman (USA)
Samuel Filler (USA)

Quarter-finals
Decision (overtime)
William Schaefer (USA)
William Beckman (USA)
Fall (3:30)
Otto Roehm (USA)
Hugo Toeppen (USA)
Fall (2:15)
William Hennessy (USA)
Abraham Mellinger (USA)
Decision
Jerry Winholtz (USA)
Charles Ericksen (USA)

Semi-finals
Fall (0:38)
William Beckman (USA)
Otto Roehm (USA)
Fall (2:58)
William Hennessy (USA)
Charles Ericksen (USA)

Final
Decision (15:00)
William Beckman (USA) (silver)
Charles Ericksen (USA) (gold)
Third place
William Hennessy (USA)
Jerry Winholtz (USA) (bronze)
