= John Hein (wrestler) =

American wrestler

Personal information
- Born: January 26, 1886 New York, New York, U.S.
- Died: August 29, 1963 (aged 77) New York, New York, U.S.
Medal record
Men's freestyle wrestling
Representing the United States
Olympic Games
Silver medal – second place	1904 St. Louis	Light flyweight

John C. Hein (January 27, 1886 – August 29, 1963) was an American wrestler who competed in the 1904 Summer Olympics. In 1904, Hein won a silver medal in the light flyweight division. He was born in New York, New York.
