= Wrestling at the 1904 Summer Olympics – Men's freestyle heavyweight =

Men's heavyweight freestyle wrestling at the Games of the III Olympiad
- Venue: Francis Field
- Date: October 15, 1904
- Competitors: 5 from 3 nations

Medalists
1st place, gold medalist(s)		Bernhoff Hansen	United States
2nd place, silver medalist(s)		Frank Kugler	United States
3rd place, bronze medalist(s)		Fred Warmbold	United States

The heavyweight was the heaviest freestyle wrestling weight class held as part of the wrestling programme at the 1904 Summer Olympics. It included wrestlers weighing over 158 pounds (71.7 kg). It was the first time the event, like all other freestyle wrestling events, was held in Olympic competition. It was held on Friday, October 14, 1904 and on Saturday, October 15, 1904. Five wrestlers competed.

== Results ==
Fred Warmbold and William Hennessy were allowed to wrestle for the bronze medal as they both lost in this tournament against the gold medalist Bernhoff Hansen.

First Round
Fall (0:23)
Bernhoff Hansen (USA)
Fred Warmbold (USA)

Semi-finals
Fall (5:07)
Bernhoff Hansen (USA)
William Hennessy (USA)
Fall (4:20)
Joseph Dilg (USA)
Frank Kugler (USA)

Final
Fall (2:00)
Bernhoff Hansen (USA) (gold)
Frank Kugler (USA) (silver)
Third place
Fred Warmbold (USA) (bronze)
William Hennessy (USA)

== Sources ==
- Wudarski, Pawel (1999). "Wyniki Igrzysk Olimpijskich" (in Polish).
