= Wrestling at the Summer Olympics =

- IOC Code: WRE
- Governing body: UWW
- Events: 18 (men: 12; women: 6)

Summer Olympics
- 1896; 1900; 1904; 1908; 1912; 1920; 1924; 1928; 1932; 1936; 1948; 1952; 1956; 1960; 1964; 1968; 1972; 1976; 1980; 1984; 1988; 1992; 1996; 2000; 2004; 2008; 2012; 2016; 2020; 2024; 2028; 2032
- Medalists; freestyle; Greco-Roman

Wrestling at the Olympic Games was contested at the first modern Olympics, in the form of Greco-Roman wrestling, held in Athens in 1896. Wrestling would appear at every Summer Olympics held since then, with the exception of the 1900 Summer Olympics when wrestling did not appear on the program. Freestyle wrestling (or catch-as-catch-can wrestling as it was called prior to the 1924 Summer Olympics) and weight classes both made their first appearance at the 1904 Summer Olympics. Women's freestyle wrestling competition was first held at the 2004 Summer Olympics.

In 2013, the IOC voted to drop wrestling from the Summer Olympic program. The president of the sport's governing body, FILA (now United World Wrestling), resigned after a subsequent motion of no confidence, and several of the FILA leadership followed suit. After new leadership stepped in and revisions to the program for the 2016 Summer Olympics (including rule changes and additional women's competitions), wrestling successfully campaigned to be readmitted back onto the Summer Olympic program.

== Summary ==
Summary of overall best wrestling nation at each Olympics, which includes combining all styles that were contested. Greco-Roman has been contested since the 1896 Summer Olympics, with men's freestyle being contested since 1904 and women's freestyle since 2004.

Games	Year	Events	Best Nation
1	1896	1	Germany (1)
2			
3	1904	7	United States (1)
4	1908	9	Great Britain (1)
5	1912	5	Finland (1)
6			
7	1920	10	Finland (2)
8	1924	13	Finland (3)
9	1928	13	Finland (4)
10	1932	14	Sweden (1)
11	1936	14	Sweden (2)
12			
13			
14	1948	16	Turkey (1)
15	1952	16	Soviet Union (1)
16	1956	16	Soviet Union (2)
17	1960	16	Turkey (2)
18	1964	16	Japan (1)
19	1968	16	Japan (2)
20	1972	20	Soviet Union (3)
21	1976	20	Soviet Union (4)
22	1980	20	Soviet Union (5)
23	1984	20	United States (2)
24	1988	20	Soviet Union (6)
25	1992	20	Unified Team (1)
26	1996	20	Russia (1)
27	2000	16	Russia (2)
28	2004	18	Russia (3)
29	2008	18	Russia (4)
30	2012	18	Russia (5)
31	2016	18	Russia (6)
32	2020	18	Japan (3)
33	2024	18	Japan (4)
34	2028	18	

== Removal and reinstatement ==
In an effort to control the size and costs of the Summer Olympics, and make the Games "relevant to sports fans of all generations", the IOC evaluated the Olympic event programme in place for the 2016 Summer Olympics, and voted on 25 "core" sports that would comprise the programme of the 2020 Summer Olympics (which was postponed to 2021 due to the COVID-19 pandemic). One vacancy was to be left open for a new sport. In February 2013, IOC members voted to remove wrestling from the Olympic programme; The New York Times cited several potential factors in the decision, including the lack of universally-known talent unlike other sports, and concern for the lack of women's competitions in wrestling (having only introduced women's freestyle competitions in 2004). FILA (now United World Wrestling), the governing body of Olympic wrestling, immediately criticized the decision. The organization cited wrestling's long-standing history as an Olympic event, which dates as far back as the ancient Olympic Games.

The decision resulted in immediate backlash; Armen Nazaryan and Sagid Murtazaliev both returned gold medals to the IOC in protest, while Nazaryan also staged a hunger strike until the 2013 European Wrestling Championships. FILA president Raphaël Martinetti resigned after a vote of non-confidence by the organization's staff.

Martinetti was replaced as acting president by Nenad Lalović. Under his leadership, the organization began to make changes to its Olympic programme for 2016, including rule changes designed to make bouts faster and encourage more aggression, as well as additional women's weight classes. These changes were intended to help improve audience interest, and address the shortcomings that likely led to the removal of the sport; wrestling joined baseball/softball, as well as squash, on a final shortlist of three sports to be included in the core Olympic programme for 2020. On 8 September 2013, at the 125th IOC Session, the IOC selected wrestling to be reinstated in the Olympic program for 2020 and 2024. Lalović was largely credited for his role in the reinstatement; he remarked that "normally this is done in a few years, we did it in a few months. It was a question of our survival."

== Events ==
=== Men ===
Men's weight classes, Greco-Roman
1896	1900–1904	1908	1912–1920	1924	1928	1932–1936	1948–1960	1964–1968	1972–1984	1988–1996	2000	2004–2012	2016	2020–2028
Open weight	—N/a	Heavyweight +93 kg	Heavyweight +82.5 kg			Heavyweight +87 kg		Heavyweight +97 kg	Super heavyweight +100 kg	Super heavyweight 100–130 kg	Super heavyweight 97–130 kg	Super heavyweight 96–120 kg	Super heavyweight 98–130 kg	Super heavyweight 97–130 kg
Open weight	—N/a	Heavyweight +93 kg	Heavyweight +82.5 kg			Heavyweight +87 kg		Heavyweight +97 kg	Heavyweight; 90–100 kg		Super heavyweight 97–130 kg	Super heavyweight 96–120 kg	Super heavyweight 98–130 kg	Super heavyweight 97–130 kg
Open weight	—N/a	Heavyweight +93 kg	Heavyweight +82.5 kg			Heavyweight +87 kg		Heavyweight +97 kg	Heavyweight; 90–100 kg		Super heavyweight 97–130 kg	Super heavyweight 96–120 kg	Heavyweight; 85–98	Super heavyweight 97–130 kg
Open weight	—N/a	Heavyweight +93 kg	Heavyweight +82.5 kg			Heavyweight +87 kg		Light heavyweight 87–97 kg	Heavyweight; 90–100 kg		Heavyweight; 85–97 kg	Super heavyweight 96–120 kg	Heavyweight; 85–98	Heavyweight; 87–97 kg
Open weight	—N/a	Heavyweight +93 kg	Heavyweight +82.5 kg			Heavyweight +87 kg		Light heavyweight 87–97 kg	Heavyweight; 90–100 kg		Heavyweight; 85–97 kg	Heavyweight; 84–96 kg	Heavyweight; 85–98	Heavyweight; 87–97 kg
Open weight	—N/a	Light heavyweight 73–93 kg	Heavyweight +82.5 kg			Heavyweight +87 kg		Light heavyweight 87–97 kg	Heavyweight; 90–100 kg		Heavyweight; 85–97 kg	Heavyweight; 84–96 kg	Heavyweight; 85–98	Heavyweight; 87–97 kg
Open weight	—N/a	Light heavyweight 73–93 kg	Heavyweight +82.5 kg			Heavyweight +87 kg		Light heavyweight 87–97 kg	Light heavyweight 82–90 kg		Heavyweight; 85–97 kg	Heavyweight; 84–96 kg	Heavyweight; 85–98	Heavyweight; 87–97 kg
Open weight	—N/a	Light heavyweight 73–93 kg	Heavyweight +82.5 kg			Light heavyweight 79–87 kg		Middleweight; 78–87 kg	Light heavyweight 82–90 kg		Heavyweight; 85–97 kg	Heavyweight; 84–96 kg	Heavyweight; 85–98	Middleweight; 77–87 kg
Open weight	—N/a	Light heavyweight 73–93 kg	Heavyweight +82.5 kg			Light heavyweight 79–87 kg		Middleweight; 78–87 kg	Light heavyweight 82–90 kg		Middleweight; 76–85 kg	Heavyweight; 84–96 kg	Middleweight; 75–85 kg	Middleweight; 77–87 kg
Open weight	—N/a	Light heavyweight 73–93 kg	Heavyweight +82.5 kg			Light heavyweight 79–87 kg		Middleweight; 78–87 kg	Light heavyweight 82–90 kg		Middleweight; 76–85 kg	Middleweight; 74–84 kg	Middleweight; 75–85 kg	Middleweight; 77–87 kg
Open weight	—N/a	Light heavyweight 73–93 kg	Light heavyweight 75–82.5 kg			Light heavyweight 79–87 kg		Middleweight; 78–87 kg	Light heavyweight 82–90 kg		Middleweight; 76–85 kg	Middleweight; 74–84 kg	Middleweight; 75–85 kg	Middleweight; 77–87 kg
Open weight	—N/a	Light heavyweight 73–93 kg	Light heavyweight 75–82.5 kg			Light heavyweight 79–87 kg		Middleweight; 78–87 kg	Middleweight; 74–82 kg		Middleweight; 76–85 kg	Middleweight; 74–84 kg	Middleweight; 75–85 kg	Middleweight; 77–87 kg
Open weight	—N/a	Light heavyweight 73–93 kg	Light heavyweight 75–82.5 kg			Middleweight; 72–79 kg	Middleweight; 73–79 kg	Middleweight; 78–87 kg	Middleweight; 74–82 kg		Middleweight; 76–85 kg	Middleweight; 74–84 kg	Middleweight; 75–85 kg	Middleweight; 77–87 kg
Open weight	—N/a	Light heavyweight 73–93 kg	Light heavyweight 75–82.5 kg			Middleweight; 72–79 kg	Middleweight; 73–79 kg	Welterweight; 70–78 kg	Middleweight; 74–82 kg		Middleweight; 76–85 kg	Middleweight; 74–84 kg	Middleweight; 75–85 kg	Middleweight; 77–87 kg
Open weight	—N/a	Light heavyweight 73–93 kg	Light heavyweight 75–82.5 kg			Middleweight; 72–79 kg	Middleweight; 73–79 kg	Welterweight; 70–78 kg	Middleweight; 74–82 kg		Middleweight; 76–85 kg	Middleweight; 74–84 kg	Middleweight; 75–85 kg	Welterweight; 67–77 kg
Open weight	—N/a	Light heavyweight 73–93 kg	Light heavyweight 75–82.5 kg			Middleweight; 72–79 kg	Middleweight; 73–79 kg	Welterweight; 70–78 kg	Middleweight; 74–82 kg		Welterweight; 69–76 kg	Middleweight; 74–84 kg	Middleweight; 75–85 kg	Welterweight; 67–77 kg
Open weight	—N/a	Light heavyweight 73–93 kg	Middleweight; 67.5–75 kg	Middleweight; 67–75 kg	Middleweight; 67.5–75 kg	Middleweight; 72–79 kg	Middleweight; 73–79 kg	Welterweight; 70–78 kg	Middleweight; 74–82 kg		Welterweight; 69–76 kg	Middleweight; 74–84 kg	Welterweight; 66–75 kg	Welterweight; 67–77 kg
Open weight	—N/a	Light heavyweight 73–93 kg	Middleweight; 67.5–75 kg	Middleweight; 67–75 kg	Middleweight; 67.5–75 kg	Middleweight; 72–79 kg	Middleweight; 73–79 kg	Welterweight; 70–78 kg	Welterweight; 68–74 kg		Welterweight; 69–76 kg	Welterweight; 66–74 kg	Welterweight; 66–75 kg	Welterweight; 67–77 kg
Open weight	—N/a	Middleweight; 66.6–73 kg	Middleweight; 67.5–75 kg	Middleweight; 67–75 kg	Middleweight; 67.5–75 kg	Middleweight; 72–79 kg	Welterweight; 67–73 kg	Welterweight; 70–78 kg	Welterweight; 68–74 kg		Welterweight; 69–76 kg	Welterweight; 66–74 kg	Welterweight; 66–75 kg	Welterweight; 67–77 kg
Open weight	—N/a	Middleweight; 66.6–73 kg	Middleweight; 67.5–75 kg	Middleweight; 67–75 kg	Middleweight; 67.5–75 kg	Welterweight; 66–72 kg	Welterweight; 67–73 kg	Welterweight; 70–78 kg	Welterweight; 68–74 kg		Welterweight; 69–76 kg	Welterweight; 66–74 kg	Welterweight; 66–75 kg	Welterweight; 67–77 kg
Open weight	—N/a	Middleweight; 66.6–73 kg	Middleweight; 67.5–75 kg	Middleweight; 67–75 kg	Middleweight; 67.5–75 kg	Welterweight; 66–72 kg	Welterweight; 67–73 kg	Lightweight; 63–70 kg	Welterweight; 68–74 kg		Welterweight; 69–76 kg	Welterweight; 66–74 kg	Welterweight; 66–75 kg	Welterweight; 67–77 kg
Open weight	—N/a	Middleweight; 66.6–73 kg	Middleweight; 67.5–75 kg	Middleweight; 67–75 kg	Middleweight; 67.5–75 kg	Welterweight; 66–72 kg	Welterweight; 67–73 kg	Lightweight; 63–70 kg	Welterweight; 68–74 kg		Lightweight; 63–69 kg	Welterweight; 66–74 kg	Welterweight; 66–75 kg	Welterweight; 67–77 kg
Open weight	—N/a	Middleweight; 66.6–73 kg	Middleweight; 67.5–75 kg	Middleweight; 67–75 kg	Middleweight; 67.5–75 kg	Welterweight; 66–72 kg	Welterweight; 67–73 kg	Lightweight; 63–70 kg	Lightweight; 62–68 kg		Lightweight; 63–69 kg	Welterweight; 66–74 kg	Welterweight; 66–75 kg	Welterweight; 67–77 kg
Open weight	—N/a	Middleweight; 66.6–73 kg	Lightweight; 60–67.5 kg	Middleweight; 67–75 kg	Lightweight; 62–67.5 kg	Welterweight; 66–72 kg	Welterweight; 67–73 kg	Lightweight; 63–70 kg	Lightweight; 62–68 kg		Lightweight; 63–69 kg	Welterweight; 66–74 kg	Welterweight; 66–75 kg	Welterweight; 67–77 kg
Open weight	—N/a	Middleweight; 66.6–73 kg	Lightweight; 60–67.5 kg	Lightweight; 62–67 kg	Lightweight; 62–67.5 kg	Welterweight; 66–72 kg	Lightweight; 62–67 kg	Lightweight; 63–70 kg	Lightweight; 62–68 kg		Lightweight; 63–69 kg	Welterweight; 66–74 kg	Welterweight; 66–75 kg	Lightweight; 60–67 kg
Open weight	—N/a	Lightweight −66.6 kg	Lightweight; 60–67.5 kg	Lightweight; 62–67 kg	Lightweight; 62–67.5 kg	Welterweight; 66–72 kg	Lightweight; 62–67 kg	Lightweight; 63–70 kg	Lightweight; 62–68 kg		Lightweight; 63–69 kg	Welterweight; 66–74 kg	Welterweight; 66–75 kg	Lightweight; 60–67 kg
Open weight	—N/a	Lightweight −66.6 kg	Lightweight; 60–67.5 kg	Lightweight; 62–67 kg	Lightweight; 62–67.5 kg	Lightweight; 61–66 kg	Lightweight; 62–67 kg	Lightweight; 63–70 kg	Lightweight; 62–68 kg		Lightweight; 63–69 kg	Lightweight; 60–66 kg	Lightweight; 59–66 kg	Lightweight; 60–67 kg
Open weight	—N/a	Lightweight −66.6 kg	Lightweight; 60–67.5 kg	Lightweight; 62–67 kg	Lightweight; 62–67.5 kg	Lightweight; 61–66 kg	Lightweight; 62–67 kg	Featherweight; 57–63 kg	Lightweight; 62–68 kg		Featherweight; 58–63 kg	Lightweight; 60–66 kg	Lightweight; 59–66 kg	Lightweight; 60–67 kg
Open weight	—N/a	Lightweight −66.6 kg	Lightweight; 60–67.5 kg	Featherweight; 58–62 kg		Lightweight; 61–66 kg	Featherweight; 57–62 kg	Featherweight; 57–63 kg	Featherweight; 57–62 kg		Featherweight; 58–63 kg	Lightweight; 60–66 kg	Lightweight; 59–66 kg	Lightweight; 60–67 kg
Open weight	—N/a	Lightweight −66.6 kg	Lightweight; 60–67.5 kg	Featherweight; 58–62 kg		Featherweight; 56–61 kg	Featherweight; 57–62 kg	Featherweight; 57–63 kg	Featherweight; 57–62 kg		Featherweight; 58–63 kg	Lightweight; 60–66 kg	Lightweight; 59–66 kg	Lightweight; 60–67 kg
Open weight	—N/a	Lightweight −66.6 kg	Featherweight −60 kg	Featherweight; 58–62 kg		Featherweight; 56–61 kg	Featherweight; 57–62 kg	Featherweight; 57–63 kg	Featherweight; 57–62 kg		Featherweight; 58–63 kg	Featherweight; 55–60 kg	Lightweight; 59–66 kg	Bantamweight −60 kg
Open weight	—N/a	Lightweight −66.6 kg	Featherweight −60 kg	Featherweight; 58–62 kg		Featherweight; 56–61 kg	Featherweight; 57–62 kg	Featherweight; 57–63 kg	Featherweight; 57–62 kg		Featherweight; 58–63 kg	Featherweight; 55–60 kg	Bantamweight −59 kg	Bantamweight −60 kg
Open weight	—N/a	Lightweight −66.6 kg	Featherweight −60 kg	Bantamweight −58 kg		Featherweight; 56–61 kg	Featherweight; 57–62 kg	Featherweight; 57–63 kg	Featherweight; 57–62 kg		Bantamweight; 54–58 kg	Featherweight; 55–60 kg	Bantamweight −59 kg	Bantamweight −60 kg
Open weight	—N/a	Lightweight −66.6 kg	Featherweight −60 kg	Bantamweight −58 kg		Featherweight; 56–61 kg	Bantamweight; 52–57 kg				Bantamweight; 54–58 kg	Featherweight; 55–60 kg	Bantamweight −59 kg	Bantamweight −60 kg
Open weight	—N/a	Lightweight −66.6 kg	Featherweight −60 kg	Bantamweight −58 kg		Bantamweight −56 kg	Bantamweight; 52–57 kg				Bantamweight; 54–58 kg	Featherweight; 55–60 kg	Bantamweight −59 kg	Bantamweight −60 kg
Open weight	—N/a	Lightweight −66.6 kg	Featherweight −60 kg	Bantamweight −58 kg		Bantamweight −56 kg	Bantamweight; 52–57 kg				Bantamweight; 54–58 kg	Bantamweight −55 kg	Bantamweight −59 kg	Bantamweight −60 kg
Open weight	—N/a	Lightweight −66.6 kg	Featherweight −60 kg	Bantamweight −58 kg		Bantamweight −56 kg	Bantamweight; 52–57 kg				Flyweight −54 kg	Bantamweight −55 kg	Bantamweight −59 kg	Bantamweight −60 kg
Open weight	—N/a	Lightweight −66.6 kg	Featherweight −60 kg	Bantamweight −58 kg		Bantamweight −56 kg	Flyweight −52 kg		Flyweight; 48–52 kg		Flyweight −54 kg	Bantamweight −55 kg	Bantamweight −59 kg	Bantamweight −60 kg
Open weight	—N/a	Lightweight −66.6 kg	Featherweight −60 kg	Bantamweight −58 kg		Bantamweight −56 kg	Flyweight −52 kg		Light flyweight −48 kg		Flyweight −54 kg	Bantamweight −55 kg	Bantamweight −59 kg	Bantamweight −60 kg
1	0	4	5	6	6	7	8	8	10	10	8	7	6	6

Men's weight classes, freestyle
1904	1908	1912	1920	1924	1928	1932–1936	1948–1960	1964–1968	1972–1984	1988–1996	2000	2004–2012	2016–2028
Heavyweight +158 lb (71.7 kg)	Heavyweight +73 kg	—N/a	Heavyweight +80 kg	Heavyweight +87 kg				Heavyweight +97 kg	Super heavyweight +100 kg	Super heavyweight 100–130 kg	Super heavyweight 97–130 kg	Super heavyweight 96–120 kg	Super heavyweight 97–125 kg
Heavyweight +158 lb (71.7 kg)	Heavyweight +73 kg	—N/a	Heavyweight +80 kg	Heavyweight +87 kg				Heavyweight +97 kg	Heavyweight; 90–100 kg		Super heavyweight 97–130 kg	Super heavyweight 96–120 kg	Super heavyweight 97–125 kg
Heavyweight +158 lb (71.7 kg)	Heavyweight +73 kg	—N/a	Heavyweight +80 kg	Heavyweight +87 kg				Light heavyweight 87–97 kg	Heavyweight; 90–100 kg		Heavyweight; 85–97 kg	Super heavyweight 96–120 kg	Heavyweight; 86–97 kg
Heavyweight +158 lb (71.7 kg)	Heavyweight +73 kg	—N/a	Heavyweight +80 kg	Heavyweight +87 kg				Light heavyweight 87–97 kg	Heavyweight; 90–100 kg		Heavyweight; 85–97 kg	Heavyweight; 84–96 kg	Heavyweight; 86–97 kg
Heavyweight +158 lb (71.7 kg)	Heavyweight +73 kg	—N/a	Heavyweight +80 kg	Heavyweight +87 kg				Light heavyweight 87–97 kg	Light heavyweight 82–90 kg		Heavyweight; 85–97 kg	Heavyweight; 84–96 kg	Heavyweight; 86–97 kg
Heavyweight +158 lb (71.7 kg)	Heavyweight +73 kg	—N/a	Heavyweight +80 kg	Light heavyweight 79–87 kg				Middleweight; 78–87 kg	Light heavyweight 82–90 kg		Heavyweight; 85–97 kg	Heavyweight; 84–96 kg	Heavyweight; 86–97 kg
Heavyweight +158 lb (71.7 kg)	Heavyweight +73 kg	—N/a	Heavyweight +80 kg	Light heavyweight 79–87 kg				Middleweight; 78–87 kg	Light heavyweight 82–90 kg		Heavyweight; 85–97 kg	Heavyweight; 84–96 kg	Middleweight; 74–86 kg
Heavyweight +158 lb (71.7 kg)	Heavyweight +73 kg	—N/a	Heavyweight +80 kg	Light heavyweight 79–87 kg				Middleweight; 78–87 kg	Light heavyweight 82–90 kg		Middleweight; 76–85 kg	Heavyweight; 84–96 kg	Middleweight; 74–86 kg
Heavyweight +158 lb (71.7 kg)	Heavyweight +73 kg	—N/a	Heavyweight +80 kg	Light heavyweight 79–87 kg				Middleweight; 78–87 kg	Light heavyweight 82–90 kg		Middleweight; 76–85 kg	Middleweight; 74–84 kg	Middleweight; 74–86 kg
Heavyweight +158 lb (71.7 kg)	Heavyweight +73 kg	—N/a	Heavyweight +80 kg	Light heavyweight 79–87 kg				Middleweight; 78–87 kg	Middleweight; 74–82 kg		Middleweight; 76–85 kg	Middleweight; 74–84 kg	Middleweight; 74–86 kg
Heavyweight +158 lb (71.7 kg)	Heavyweight +73 kg	—N/a	Light heavyweight 69–80 kg	Light heavyweight 79–87 kg				Middleweight; 78–87 kg	Middleweight; 74–82 kg		Middleweight; 76–85 kg	Middleweight; 74–84 kg	Middleweight; 74–86 kg
Heavyweight +158 lb (71.7 kg)	Heavyweight +73 kg	—N/a	Light heavyweight 69–80 kg	Middleweight; 72–79 kg			Middleweight; 73–79 kg	Middleweight; 78–87 kg	Middleweight; 74–82 kg		Middleweight; 76–85 kg	Middleweight; 74–84 kg	Middleweight; 74–86 kg
Heavyweight +158 lb (71.7 kg)	Heavyweight +73 kg	—N/a	Light heavyweight 69–80 kg	Middleweight; 72–79 kg			Middleweight; 73–79 kg	Welterweight; 70–78 kg	Middleweight; 74–82 kg		Middleweight; 76–85 kg	Middleweight; 74–84 kg	Middleweight; 74–86 kg
Heavyweight +158 lb (71.7 kg)	Heavyweight +73 kg	—N/a	Light heavyweight 69–80 kg	Middleweight; 72–79 kg			Middleweight; 73–79 kg	Welterweight; 70–78 kg	Middleweight; 74–82 kg		Welterweight; 69–76 kg	Middleweight; 74–84 kg	Middleweight; 74–86 kg
Heavyweight +158 lb (71.7 kg)	Heavyweight +73 kg	—N/a	Light heavyweight 69–80 kg	Middleweight; 72–79 kg			Middleweight; 73–79 kg	Welterweight; 70–78 kg	Welterweight; 68–74 kg		Welterweight; 69–76 kg	Welterweight; 66–74 kg	Welterweight; 65–74 kg
Heavyweight +158 lb (71.7 kg)	Middleweight; 66.6–73 kg	—N/a	Light heavyweight 69–80 kg	Middleweight; 72–79 kg			Welterweight; 67–73 kg	Welterweight; 70–78 kg	Welterweight; 68–74 kg		Welterweight; 69–76 kg	Welterweight; 66–74 kg	Welterweight; 65–74 kg
Heavyweight +158 lb (71.7 kg)	Middleweight; 66.6–73 kg	—N/a	Light heavyweight 69–80 kg	Welterweight; 66–72 kg	Welterweight; 65–72 kg	Welterweight; 66–72 kg	Welterweight; 67–73 kg	Welterweight; 70–78 kg	Welterweight; 68–74 kg		Welterweight; 69–76 kg	Welterweight; 66–74 kg	Welterweight; 65–74 kg
Welterweight; 145–158 lb (65.8–71.7 kg)	Middleweight; 66.6–73 kg	—N/a	Light heavyweight 69–80 kg	Welterweight; 66–72 kg	Welterweight; 65–72 kg	Welterweight; 66–72 kg	Welterweight; 67–73 kg	Welterweight; 70–78 kg	Welterweight; 68–74 kg		Welterweight; 69–76 kg	Welterweight; 66–74 kg	Welterweight; 65–74 kg
Welterweight; 145–158 lb (65.8–71.7 kg)	Middleweight; 66.6–73 kg	—N/a	Light heavyweight 69–80 kg	Welterweight; 66–72 kg	Welterweight; 65–72 kg	Welterweight; 66–72 kg	Welterweight; 67–73 kg	Lightweight; 63–70 kg	Welterweight; 68–74 kg		Welterweight; 69–76 kg	Welterweight; 66–74 kg	Welterweight; 65–74 kg
Welterweight; 145–158 lb (65.8–71.7 kg)	Middleweight; 66.6–73 kg	—N/a	Middleweight; 61–69 kg	Welterweight; 66–72 kg	Welterweight; 65–72 kg	Welterweight; 66–72 kg	Welterweight; 67–73 kg	Lightweight; 63–70 kg	Welterweight; 68–74 kg		Lightweight; 63–69 kg	Welterweight; 66–74 kg	Welterweight; 65–74 kg
Welterweight; 145–158 lb (65.8–71.7 kg)	Middleweight; 66.6–73 kg	—N/a	Middleweight; 61–69 kg	Welterweight; 66–72 kg	Welterweight; 65–72 kg	Welterweight; 66–72 kg	Welterweight; 67–73 kg	Lightweight; 63–70 kg	Lightweight; 62–68 kg		Lightweight; 63–69 kg	Welterweight; 66–74 kg	Welterweight; 65–74 kg
Welterweight; 145–158 lb (65.8–71.7 kg)	Middleweight; 66.6–73 kg	—N/a	Middleweight; 61–69 kg	Welterweight; 66–72 kg	Welterweight; 65–72 kg	Welterweight; 66–72 kg	Lightweight; 62–67 kg	Lightweight; 63–70 kg	Lightweight; 62–68 kg		Lightweight; 63–69 kg	Welterweight; 66–74 kg	Welterweight; 65–74 kg
Welterweight; 145–158 lb (65.8–71.7 kg)	Lightweight; 60.3–66.6 kg	—N/a	Middleweight; 61–69 kg	Welterweight; 66–72 kg	Welterweight; 65–72 kg	Welterweight; 66–72 kg	Lightweight; 62–67 kg	Lightweight; 63–70 kg	Lightweight; 62–68 kg		Lightweight; 63–69 kg	Welterweight; 66–74 kg	Welterweight; 65–74 kg
Welterweight; 145–158 lb (65.8–71.7 kg)	Lightweight; 60.3–66.6 kg	—N/a	Middleweight; 61–69 kg	Lightweight; 61–66 kg	Welterweight; 65–72 kg	Lightweight; 61–66 kg	Lightweight; 62–67 kg	Lightweight; 63–70 kg	Lightweight; 62–68 kg		Lightweight; 63–69 kg	Lightweight; 60–66 kg	Welterweight; 65–74 kg
Lightweight; 135–145 lb (61.2–65.8 kg)	Lightweight; 60.3–66.6 kg	—N/a	Middleweight; 61–69 kg	Lightweight; 61–66 kg	Welterweight; 65–72 kg	Lightweight; 61–66 kg	Lightweight; 62–67 kg	Lightweight; 63–70 kg	Lightweight; 62–68 kg		Lightweight; 63–69 kg	Lightweight; 60–66 kg	Welterweight; 65–74 kg
Lightweight; 135–145 lb (61.2–65.8 kg)	Lightweight; 60.3–66.6 kg	—N/a	Middleweight; 61–69 kg	Lightweight; 61–66 kg	Lightweight; 61–65 kg	Lightweight; 61–66 kg	Lightweight; 62–67 kg	Lightweight; 63–70 kg	Lightweight; 62–68 kg		Lightweight; 63–69 kg	Lightweight; 60–66 kg	Lightweight; 57–65 kg
Lightweight; 135–145 lb (61.2–65.8 kg)	Lightweight; 60.3–66.6 kg	—N/a	Middleweight; 61–69 kg	Lightweight; 61–66 kg	Lightweight; 61–65 kg	Lightweight; 61–66 kg	Lightweight; 62–67 kg	Featherweight; 57–63 kg	Lightweight; 62–68 kg		Featherweight; 58–63 kg	Lightweight; 60–66 kg	Lightweight; 57–65 kg
Lightweight; 135–145 lb (61.2–65.8 kg)	Lightweight; 60.3–66.6 kg	—N/a	Middleweight; 61–69 kg	Lightweight; 61–66 kg	Lightweight; 61–65 kg	Lightweight; 61–66 kg	Featherweight; 57–62 kg	Featherweight; 57–63 kg	Featherweight; 57–62 kg		Featherweight; 58–63 kg	Lightweight; 60–66 kg	Lightweight; 57–65 kg
Featherweight; 125–135 lb (56.7–61.2 kg)	Lightweight; 60.3–66.6 kg	—N/a	Middleweight; 61–69 kg	Lightweight; 61–66 kg	Lightweight; 61–65 kg	Lightweight; 61–66 kg	Featherweight; 57–62 kg	Featherweight; 57–63 kg	Featherweight; 57–62 kg		Featherweight; 58–63 kg	Lightweight; 60–66 kg	Lightweight; 57–65 kg
Featherweight; 125–135 lb (56.7–61.2 kg)	Lightweight; 60.3–66.6 kg	—N/a	Lightweight; 54–61 kg	Featherweight; 56–61 kg			Featherweight; 57–62 kg	Featherweight; 57–63 kg	Featherweight; 57–62 kg		Featherweight; 58–63 kg	Lightweight; 60–66 kg	Lightweight; 57–65 kg
Featherweight; 125–135 lb (56.7–61.2 kg)	Featherweight; 54–60.3 kg	—N/a	Lightweight; 54–61 kg	Featherweight; 56–61 kg			Featherweight; 57–62 kg	Featherweight; 57–63 kg	Featherweight; 57–62 kg		Featherweight; 58–63 kg	Lightweight; 60–66 kg	Lightweight; 57–65 kg
Featherweight; 125–135 lb (56.7–61.2 kg)	Featherweight; 54–60.3 kg	—N/a	Lightweight; 54–61 kg	Featherweight; 56–61 kg			Featherweight; 57–62 kg	Featherweight; 57–63 kg	Featherweight; 57–62 kg		Featherweight; 58–63 kg	Featherweight; 55–60 kg	Lightweight; 57–65 kg
Featherweight; 125–135 lb (56.7–61.2 kg)	Featherweight; 54–60.3 kg	—N/a	Lightweight; 54–61 kg	Featherweight; 56–61 kg			Featherweight; 57–62 kg	Featherweight; 57–63 kg	Featherweight; 57–62 kg		Bantamweight; 54–58 kg	Featherweight; 55–60 kg	Lightweight; 57–65 kg
Featherweight; 125–135 lb (56.7–61.2 kg)	Featherweight; 54–60.3 kg	—N/a	Lightweight; 54–61 kg	Featherweight; 56–61 kg			Bantamweight; 52–57 kg				Bantamweight; 54–58 kg	Featherweight; 55–60 kg	Bantamweight −57 kg
Bantamweight; 115–125 lb (52.2–56.7 kg)	Featherweight; 54–60.3 kg	—N/a	Lightweight; 54–61 kg	Featherweight; 56–61 kg			Bantamweight; 52–57 kg				Bantamweight; 54–58 kg	Featherweight; 55–60 kg	Bantamweight −57 kg
Bantamweight; 115–125 lb (52.2–56.7 kg)	Featherweight; 54–60.3 kg	—N/a	Lightweight; 54–61 kg	Bantamweight −56 kg			Bantamweight; 52–57 kg				Bantamweight; 54–58 kg	Featherweight; 55–60 kg	Bantamweight −57 kg
Bantamweight; 115–125 lb (52.2–56.7 kg)	Featherweight; 54–60.3 kg	—N/a	Lightweight; 54–61 kg	Bantamweight −56 kg			Bantamweight; 52–57 kg				Bantamweight; 54–58 kg	Bantamweight −55 kg	Bantamweight −57 kg
Bantamweight; 115–125 lb (52.2–56.7 kg)	Bantamweight −54 kg	—N/a	Featherweight −54 kg	Bantamweight −56 kg			Bantamweight; 52–57 kg				Featherweight −54 kg	Bantamweight −55 kg	Bantamweight −57 kg
Flyweight; 105–115 lb (47.6–52.2 kg)	Bantamweight −54 kg	—N/a	Featherweight −54 kg	Bantamweight −56 kg			Bantamweight; 52–57 kg				Featherweight −54 kg	Bantamweight −55 kg	Bantamweight −57 kg
Flyweight; 105–115 lb (47.6–52.2 kg)	Bantamweight −54 kg	—N/a	Featherweight −54 kg	Bantamweight −56 kg			Flyweight −52 kg		Flyweight; 48–52 kg		Featherweight −54 kg	Bantamweight −55 kg	Bantamweight −57 kg
Flyweight; 105–115 lb (47.6–52.2 kg)	Bantamweight −54 kg	—N/a	Featherweight −54 kg	Bantamweight −56 kg			Flyweight −52 kg		Light flyweight −48 kg		Featherweight −54 kg	Bantamweight −55 kg	Bantamweight −57 kg
Light flyweight −105 lb (47.6 kg)	Bantamweight −54 kg	—N/a	Featherweight −54 kg	Bantamweight −56 kg			Flyweight −52 kg		Light flyweight −48 kg		Featherweight −54 kg	Bantamweight −55 kg	Bantamweight −57 kg
7	5	0	5	7	7	7	8	8	10	10	8	7	6

Men's events
Weight classes	96	00	04	08	12	20	24	28	32	36	48	52	56	60	64	68	72	76	80	84	88	92	96	00	04	08	12	16	20	24	28	Years
Greco-Roman light flyweight																	48	48	48	48	48	48	48									7
Greco-Roman flyweight											52	52	52	52	52	52	52	52	52	52	52	52	52	54								14
Greco-Roman bantamweight							58	58	56	56	57	57	57	57	57	57	57	57	57	57	57	57	57	58	55	55	55	59	60	60	60	25
Greco-Roman featherweight					60	60	62	62	61	61	62	62	62	62	63	63	62	62	62	62	62	62	62	63	60	60	60					23
Greco-Roman lightweight				66.6	67.5	67.5	67	67.5	66	66	67	67	67	67	70	70	68	68	68	68	68	68	68	69	66	66	66	66	67	67	67	28
Greco-Roman welterweight									72	72	73	73	73	73	78	78	74	74	74	74	74	74	74	76	74	74	74	75	77	77	77	23
Greco-Roman middleweight				73	75	75	75	75	79	79	79	79	79	79	87	87	82	82	82	82	82	82	82	85	84	84	84	85	87	87	87	28
Greco-Roman light heavyweight				93	82.5	82.5	82.5	82.5	87	87	87	87	87	87	97	97	90	90	90	90	90	90	90									20
Greco-Roman heavyweight					+82.5	+82.5	+82.5	+82.5	+87	+87	+87	+87	+87	+87	+97	+97	100	100	100	100	100	100	100	97	96	96	96	98	97	97	97	26
Greco-Roman super heavyweight				+93													+100	+100	+100	+100	130	130	130	130	120	120	120	130	130	130	130	15
Greco-Roman open	X																															1
Freestyle light flyweight			(47.6)														48	48	48	48	48	48	48									8
Freestyle flyweight			(52.2)								52	52	52	52	52	52	52	52	52	52	52	52	52	54								15
Freestyle bantamweight			(56.7)	54			56	56	56	56	57	57	57	57	57	57	57	57	57	57	57	57	57	58	55	55	55	57	57	57	57	27
Freestyle featherweight			(61.2)	60.3		54	61	61	61	61	62	62	62	62	63	63	62	62	62	62	62	62	62	63	60	60	60					24
Freestyle lightweight			(65.8)	66.6		61	66	65	66	66	67	67	67	67	70	70	68	68	68	68	68	68	68	69	66	66	66	65	65	65	65	27
Freestyle welterweight			(71.7)				72	72	72	72	73	73	73	73	78	78	74	74	74	74	74	74	74	76	74	74	74	74	74	74	74	26
Freestyle middleweight				73		69	79	79	79	79	79	79	79	79	87	87	82	82	82	82	82	82	82	85	84	84	84	86	86	86	86	26
Freestyle light heavyweight						80	87	87	87	87	87	87	87	87	97	97	90	90	90	90	90	90	90									18
Freestyle heavyweight			(+71.7)	+73		+80	+87	+87	+87	+87	+87	+87	+87	+87	+97	+97	100	100	100	100	100	100	100	97	96	96	96	97	97	97	97	28
Freestyle super heavyweight																	+100	+100	+100	+100	130	130	130	130	120	120	120	125	125	125	125	15
Total	1	0	7	9	5	10	13	13	14	14	16	16	16	16	16	16	20	20	20	20	20	20	20	16	14	14	14	12	12	12	12	

=== Women ===
Women's weight classes, freestyle
2004–2012	2016	2020–2028
Heavyweight; 63–72 kg	Heavyweight; 69–75 kg	Heavyweight; 68–76 kg
Heavyweight; 63–72 kg	Light heavyweight 63–69 kg	Heavyweight; 68–76 kg
Heavyweight; 63–72 kg	Light heavyweight 63–69 kg	Light heavyweight 62–68 kg
Middleweight; 55–63 kg	Middleweight; 58–63 kg	Middleweight; 57–62 kg
Middleweight; 55–63 kg	Welterweight; 53–58 kg	Middleweight; 57–62 kg
Middleweight; 55–63 kg	Welterweight; 53–58 kg	Welterweight; 53–57 kg
Bantamweight; 48–55 kg	Welterweight; 53–58 kg	
Bantamweight; 48–55 kg	Bantamweight; 48–53 kg	Bantamweight; 50–53 kg
Bantamweight; 48–55 kg	Bantamweight; 48–53 kg	Flyweight −50 kg
Flyweight −48 kg		Flyweight −50 kg
4	6	6

Event	04	08	12	16	20	24	28	Years
Freestyle flyweight	48	48	48	48	50	50	50	7
Freestyle bantamweight	55	55	55	53	53	53	53	7
Freestyle welterweight				58	57	57	57	4
Freestyle middleweight	63	63	63	63	62	62	62	7
Freestyle light heavyweight				69	68	68	68	4
Freestyle heavyweight	72	72	72	75	76	76	76	7
Total	4	4	4	6	6	6	6	7

== Participating nations ==
The following nations have taken part in the wrestling competition. The numbers in the table indicate the number of competitors sent to that year's Olympics (X means qualified wrestlers for the next Olympics).

Nation	96	00	04	08	12	20	24	28	32	36	48	52	56	60	64	68	72	76	80	84	88	92	96	00	04	08	12	16	20	24	Years
Afghanistan														7	8	5	8		8		5				1						7
Albania																							1		1	2				3	4
Algeria																			3			2	2	2	1	3	3	3	8	8	10
American Samoa																					1		1				1				3
Argentina								5			8	5	2	3	4	3	3	3		3	2	1	1				1	1	1		16
Armenia																							8	8	7	9	7	8	6	5	8
Australia							1	3	1	3	4	4	15	9	8	3	3	3	3	3	3	2	9	11	1	4	1	3		2	23
Austria							8	2	1	7	5	3	4	7	4	1	4	2	5	7	5	2			3		1	1			19
Azerbaijan																							8	9	7	16	13	14	7	12	8
Bahamas																2															2
Bahrain																												1		1	2
Belarus																							16	14	10	9	11	8	8		7
Belgium				4	1	12	17	13	11		9	8	3	5	3	2	2	2	3		1	1	1								18
Bohemia				4	4																										2
Bolivia																				1											1
Bosnia and Herzegovina																							1								1
Brazil																					2	1			1	1	1	5	3	1	8
Bulgaria													8	16	16	16	20	20	20		20	20	11	8	13	12	9	11	7	6	17
Cambodia																							1					1			2
Cameroon																			6	5	4		1			1	1	3	1		8
Canada				1		1	5	5	6	5	9	4	2		4	7	9	15		13	11	13	14	4	7	10	9	8	4	6	24
Central African Republic																											1				1
Chile																											1		1	2	3
China																				7	11	8	5	5	9	16	8	13	11	13	11
Chinese Taipei																				1	4							1			3
Colombia																				1	4	1	3	1	1	3	3	5	3	4	11
Croatia																						1	1				2	1	2		5
Cuba											3					3	7	9	10			15	15	13	12	12	12	10	12	10	14
Cyprus																						1	1								2
Czech Republic																							3	3	2	1	1	1	1		7
Czechoslovakia						10	9	6	2	13	3	3		5	4	6	10	5	8		9	7									15
Denmark				11	9	10	11	7	3	5	5	5		4	3	3	3		2						1	2	2	1	1	1	20
Dominican Republic																2				1		1			1					1	5
East Germany																10	17	12	9		8										5
Ecuador																2		1		1							2	2	2	4	7
Egypt						1	2	4	3		13	12		4	4	4	4			10	5	3	1	2	3	7	13	10	8	11	21
El Salvador																				1	1					1					3
Estonia						4	8	6	1	8												4	4	3	1		2	3	2	1	13
Federated States of Micronesia																											1				1
Finland				4	37	18	24	13	10	13	15	16	10	14	10	9	10	7	8	11	12	7	5	4	2	1	2	3	2	3	27
France					6	17	23	13	5	10	11	10	2	9	3	4	5	5	2	8	9	9	2	3	6	9	6	2	2	3	26
The Gambia																					3										1
Georgia																							8	13	12	10	13	11	7	7	8
Germany	1			1	14			6	5	14		8										17	11	10	9	7	4	7	7	7	16
Great Britain	1			53	12	10	14	6	2	6	16	6	4	6	6	4	6	7	6	7	7	1	1		1		1				23
Greece	2				1	5	2	3	2	4	5	3	2	3	5	8	9	4	5	10	5	11	10	7	18	3	2	1	2	2	27
Guam																					1	1	1		1	1	1		1	2	8
Guatemala												3				5	4				1	1	1								6
Guinea																					2								1		2
Guinea-Bissau																							1	1	1	1	2	2	2	2	8
Haiti																												1			1
Honduras																											1			1	2
Hungary	1			7	10		12	6	5	12	12	12	8	10	10	13	18	18	19		18	17	11	8	9	9	7	8	6	5	26
Iceland					1																										1
Independent Olympic Participants																						9							1		2
India						2				3	6	4	7	5	8	4	8		6	8	7	6	1	1	7	3	5	8	7	6	21
Indonesia																					2										1
Individual Neutral Athletes																														2	1
Iran												8	8		12	9	14	17			15	16	10	11	13	12	13	12	11	12	16
Iraq														1		1			9	3	5						1				6
Ireland												1	1	4	2						1										5
Israel																	2	1			2	4	1	3	3			1			8
Italy				1	6	8	17	5	6	10	11	14	5	16	5	5	7	8	6	7	4	5	4	2	6	2	1	2	2	2	27
Ivory Coast																											1				1
Japan							1	1	7	5		5	8	16	16	15	20	20		20	20	16	12	8	13	10	13	10	12	13	22
Jordan																					2										1
Kazakhstan																							11	11	12	16	15	12	11	8	8
Kenya																					4										1
Kyrgyzstan																							4	6	8	5	4	7	9	10	7
Kosovo																													1		1
Latvia							6	2		3												1	1	1	1		2	1	1		10
Lebanon											5	4		6		2	2	1	1	1	1										9
Lithuania																						1	3	2	3	4	2	1	1	3	9
Luxembourg						2	2	3		1	2	3		4	1																8
North Macedonia																							3	2	2	1			1	1	5
Madagascar																											1				1
Malta																				2	2										2
Mauritania																				2	4										2
Mauritius																					1										1
Mexico									2		4	5	1	4	4	12	9	2	2	5	4	2	7			1	2	1	1	2	19
Moldova																							6	4	2	2	2	3	2	8	8
Mongolia															8	8	13	13	13		9	7	4	4	6	6	8	10	9	9	15
Morocco														5		4	3	4		5	5	4	5				2	3	1	1	12
Namibia																									1		1				2
Netherlands				9	3	9	8	6			4			3			1							1				1			10
New Zealand													1	1	2		1	2		3	2	2		3				1		1	11
Nicaragua																						1									1
Nigeria																			1	3	6	5	4	2	1	2	4	7	5	6	12
North Korea																	2	3	3			4	3	4	1	3	5	4		5	11
Norway				1	9	7	7	7	1	3	6	7	1	4	1	3	5	2		5	5	2	1	1	1	1	1	2		1	25
Pakistan													6	7	6	2	2	2		2	3	1	1								10
Palau																									1	2		1			3
Panama														1	3	2	2	1		1	2	2	1								9
Peru																	4		2	2	1		5		1	1		1	1		9
Philippines										1	1	1	3		4	4	3				2										8
Poland							2	4		3		5		12	5	12	18	14	20		18	13	11	9	9	9	4	8	6	5	19
Portugal					2			1						3		4	3	3			1	1	1		1						10
Puerto Rico																		5		3	2	4	5		1		3	2	1	4	10
Republic of China																	1														1
Refugee Olympic Team																														2	2
Romania										5		7	4	7	10	12	20	19	20	10	4	11	10	5	5	8	2	5	5	5	19
Russia				4	11																		20	16	18	18	16	17	17		9
Samoa																					2			1						1	3
San Marino																													1	1	2
Senegal																	4	5	3	4	4	3	2	1	1	1	2	2	1		13
Serbia																										2	1	3	4	5	5
Serbia and Montenegro																									1						1
Slovakia																							4	4	3	2			1	1	6
South Africa						1		1		2	3	5	4									3	1	1	1	1				1	12
South Korea											4	1	3	4	13	8	4	11		14	19	16	15	10	9	11	9	5	2	2	19
Soviet Union												16	16	16	16	16	20	20	20		20										9
Spain							4							4	1				2	3	9	10			2	3	1	1			11
Sweden				9	34	13	13	9	13	14	16	1	10	12	9	7	7	8	8	11	10	8	7	5	7	5	6	7	3	2	27
Switzerland						4	12	11		13	12	5		12	3	3	9		1	2	4	4	2	4	2	1	1		1		20
Syria																2	2		17	3	8	3	2								7
Tajikistan																							1		4	2	4			1	4
Tunisia																	2				3	3	3	4	1	3	8	4	10	4	11
Turkey							5	6		11	16	15	13	16	15	16	16	11		16	13	15	13	12	12	13	13	14	9	11	22
Turkmenistan																							1	1							2
Ukraine																							17	16	16	16	13	11	10	9	8
Unified Team																						20									1
United States			42	6	2	18	14	7	7	7	8	8	15	16	16	16	19	20		19	20	20	20	16	17	17	17	14	15	116	26
United Team of Germany													5	15	14																3
Uzbekistan																							10	11	7	8	8	8	8	7	8
Venezuela												3		2								1	6	2	2	3	7	9		4	10
Vietnam																			5		1						1	2			4
Virgin Islands																		4													1
West Germany																11	17	15		14	17										5
Yemen																					3		1								2
Yugoslavia							2	5		5		3	2	5	4	8	10	6	10	9			2								13
Nations	4		1	14	18	19	26	29	18	29	28	36	30	44	39	45	49	41	35	44	69	59	75	55	66	59	71	67	61	60	
Competitors	5		42	115	170	152	229	166	79	200	207	215	167	338	270	296	388	331	266	267	429	370	401	314	342	344	344	344	288	290	
Year	96	00	04	08	12	20	24	28	32	36	48	52	56	60	64	68	72	76	80	84	88	92	96	00	04	08	12	16	20	24	

== All-time medal tables – 1896–2024 ==
=== All-time medal table combined – Greco-Roman, Freestyle men's and women's – 1900–2024 ===
Rank	Nation	Gold	Silver	Bronze	Total
1	Soviet Union	62	31	23	116
2	United States	59	47	43	149
3	Japan	45	23	19	87
4	Russia	31	11	14	56
5	Turkey	29	18	21	68
6	Sweden	28	27	31	86
7	Finland	26	28	29	83
8	Hungary	20	17	19	56
9	Bulgaria	18	32	23	73
10	Iran	13	19	23	55
11	Cuba	12	7	13	32
12	South Korea	11	11	14	36
13	Romania	7	8	19	34
14	Italy	7	4	11	22
15	Unified Team	6	5	5	16
16	Germany	5	12	11	28
17	Poland	5	9	13	27
18	Estonia	5	2	4	11
19	Azerbaijan	4	8	16	28
20	Ukraine	4	8	9	21
21	Georgia	4	7	10	21
22	Yugoslavia	4	6	6	16
23	France	4	4	10	18
24	Switzerland	4	4	6	14
25	ROC (ROC)	4	0	4	8
26	Canada	3	7	7	17
27	Great Britain	3	4	10	17
28	North Korea	3	2	7	12
29	Uzbekistan	3	2	5	10
30	China	2	6	12	20
31	Armenia	2	5	4	11
32	Egypt	2	3	3	8
33	East Germany	2	3	2	7
34	Norway	2	2	3	7
35	Czechoslovakia	1	7	7	15
36	Kazakhstan	1	6	11	18
37	United Team of Germany	1	5	3	9
38	West Germany	1	4	4	9
39	Greece	1	3	8	12
40	Bahrain	1	0	0	1
40	Serbia	1	0	0	1
42	Belarus	0	7	7	14
43	Kyrgyzstan	0	4	7	11
44	Mongolia	0	4	6	10
45	Denmark	0	3	7	10
46	Belgium	0	3	0	3
46	Russian Empire	0	3	0	3
48	India	0	2	6	8
49	Australia	0	1	2	3
49	Lebanon	0	1	2	3
51	Lithuania	0	1	1	2
51	Moldova	0	1	1	2
51	Puerto Rico	0	1	1	2
54	Chile	0	1	0	1
54	Ecuador	0	1	0	1
54	Latvia	0	1	0	1
54	Mexico	0	1	0	1
54	Nigeria	0	1	0	1
54	Slovakia	0	1	0	1
54	Syria	0	1	0	1
54	Tajikistan	0	1	0	1
62	Colombia	0	0	3	3
63	Albania	0	0	2	2
63	Austria	0	0	2	2
65	Croatia	0	0	1	1
65	Czech Republic	0	0	1	1
65	North Macedonia	0	0	1	1
65	Pakistan	0	0	1	1
65	San Marino	0	0	1	1
65	Spain	0	0	1	1
65	Tunisia	0	0	1	1
Totals (71 entries)		446	446	536	1,428

=== All-time medal table – Greco-Roman – 1896–2024 ===
Rank	Nation	Gold	Silver	Bronze	Total
1	Soviet Union	34	16	10	60
2	Sweden	20	17	21	58
3	Finland	18	21	19	58
4	Hungary	17	13	11	41
5	Russia	12	3	7	22
6	Turkey	11	6	8	25
7	Bulgaria	10	14	9	33
8	Cuba	10	5	4	19
9	South Korea	7	2	7	16
10	Romania	6	8	13	27
11	Japan	6	7	4	17
12	Italy	6	4	9	19
13	Iran	6	2	5	13
14	Poland	5	8	8	21
15	Germany	4	10	8	22
16	United States	3	6	6	15
17	Yugoslavia	3	5	4	12
18	Unified Team	3	3	3	9
19	Estonia	3	1	4	8
20	Armenia	2	4	4	10
20	Ukraine	2	4	4	10
22	Egypt	2	3	3	8
23	France	2	2	5	9
24	Norway	2	1	2	5
25	East Germany	2	1	1	4
26	Czechoslovakia	1	6	4	11
27	Greece	1	3	5	9
28	Georgia	1	3	4	8
29	Kazakhstan	1	3	2	6
30	West Germany	1	3	1	5
31	Azerbaijan	1	2	5	8
32	ROC (ROC)	1	0	2	3
33	Uzbekistan	1	0	1	2
34	Serbia	1	0	0	1
35	United Team of Germany	0	4	3	7
36	Denmark	0	3	7	10
37	Russian Empire	0	3	0	3
38	China	0	2	6	8
39	Belarus	0	2	5	7
40	Kyrgyzstan	0	2	4	6
41	Lebanon	0	1	2	3
42	Lithuania	0	1	1	2
43	Chile	0	1	0	1
43	Latvia	0	1	0	1
43	Mexico	0	1	0	1
46	North Korea	0	0	2	2
47	Austria	0	0	1	1
47	Croatia	0	0	1	1
47	Czech Republic	0	0	1	1
47	Moldova	0	0	1	1
47	Switzerland	0	0	1	1
Totals (51 entries)		205	207	238	650

=== All-time medal table – Freestyle men's and women's – 1904–2024 ===
Rank	Nation	Gold	Silver	Bronze	Total
1	United States	56	41	37	134
2	Japan	39	16	15	70
3	Soviet Union	28	15	13	56
4	Russia	19	8	7	34
5	Turkey	18	12	13	43
6	Bulgaria	8	18	14	40
7	Sweden	8	10	10	28
8	Finland	8	7	10	25
9	Iran	7	17	18	42
10	South Korea	4	9	7	20
11	Switzerland	4	4	5	13
12	Canada	3	7	7	17
13	Azerbaijan	3	6	11	20
14	Great Britain	3	4	10	17
15	Hungary	3	4	8	15
16	Georgia	3	4	6	13
17	North Korea	3	2	5	10
18	Unified Team	3	2	2	7
19	ROC (ROC)	3	0	2	5
20	China	2	4	6	12
20	Ukraine	2	4	6	12
22	Cuba	2	2	9	13
23	France	2	2	5	9
24	Uzbekistan	2	2	4	8
25	Estonia	2	1	0	3
26	Germany	1	2	3	6
27	Yugoslavia	1	1	2	4
28	United Team of Germany	1	1	0	2
29	Romania	1	0	6	7
30	Italy	1	0	2	3
31	Bahrain	1	0	0	1
32	Belarus	0	5	2	7
33	Mongolia	0	4	6	10
34	Kazakhstan	0	3	9	12
35	Belgium	0	3	0	3
36	India	0	2	6	8
37	Kyrgyzstan	0	2	3	5
38	East Germany	0	2	1	3
39	Poland	0	1	5	6
40	Czechoslovakia	0	1	3	4
40	West Germany	0	1	3	4
42	Australia	0	1	2	3
43	Norway	0	1	1	2
43	Puerto Rico	0	1	1	2
45	Armenia	0	1	0	1
45	Ecuador	0	1	0	1
45	Moldova	0	1	0	1
45	Nigeria	0	1	0	1
45	Slovakia	0	1	0	1
45	Syria	0	1	0	1
45	Tajikistan	0	1	0	1
52	Colombia	0	0	3	3
52	Greece	0	0	3	3
54	Albania	0	0	2	2
55	Austria	0	0	1	1
55	North Macedonia	0	0	1	1
55	Pakistan	0	0	1	1
55	San Marino	0	0	1	1
55	Spain	0	0	1	1
55	Tunisia	0	0	1	1
Totals (60 entries)		241	239	299	779

== See also ==
- List of Olympic medalists in Freestyle wrestling
- List of Olympic medalists in Greco-Roman wrestling
- List of Olympic venues in wrestling
- Politics and sports
- Ancient Olympic Games
