= Deaths in November 1988 =

The following is a list of notable deaths in November 1988.

Entries for each day are listed alphabetically by surname. A typical entry lists information in the following sequence:

- Name, age, country of citizenship at birth, subsequent country of citizenship (if applicable), reason for notability, cause of death (if known), and reference.

== November 1988 ==
=== 1 ===
- Siddiq Abubakar III, 85, Nigerian Muslim leader, Sultan of Sokoto.
- Broda Otto Barnes, 82, American physician and professor of medicine (Hypothyroidism).
- Michel Fauconnet, 79, Swiss Olympic fencer (1928, 1936).
- George Folsey, 90, American cinematographer (Metro-Goldwyn-Mayer), stroke.
- Hans P. Kraus, 81, Austrian-born American rare book dealer, pneumonia .
- Lefty Sullivan, 72, American MLB player (Cleveland Indians).
- Tuomo Suomalainen, 56, Finnish architect.

=== 2 ===
- Ralph Amsden, 71, American basketball player.
- Rosalie Glynn Grylls, 83, British biographer.
- Hokuma Gurbanova, 75, Azerbaijani actress.
- Lukas Heller, 58, German-born British screenwriter (What Ever Happened to Baby Jane?, Hush...Hush, Sweet Charlotte).
- Stewart Parker, 47, Northern Irish poet and playwright, stomach cancer.
- Menachem Savidor, 71, Israeli civil servant and politician, Speaker of the Knesset.
- James R. Shepley, 71, American journalist and businessman, president of Time Inc., CEO of The Washington Star, cancer.
- P. Thanulinga Nadar, 73, Indian politician, member of Lok Sabha.

=== 3 ===
- Hussain Adam, 20, Maldivian soldier, shot.
- Rachel Andresen, 81, American social worker and founder of Youth For Understanding.
- Sidney Carroll, 75, American film and television screenwriter (The Hustler, A Big Hand for the Little Lady).
- Harold Martin, 70, Australian bomber pilot and Air Marshall in the Royal Air Force.
- Lionel C. McGarr, 84, American general in the U.S. Army.
- George Mitchell, 87, American Olympic water polo player (1924, 1928).
- Henri van Praag, 72, Dutch writer and religious historian, known also for publications on parapsychology.
- Marie Raymond, 80, French abstract painter.
- David Robilliard, 36, British poet and artist, AIDS.
- Keith Schow, 57, Australian rules footballer.
- Flora Rheta Schreiber, 70, American journalist and author (Sybil), heart attack.

=== 4 ===
- Elinor Bellingham-Smith, 81, British painter of landscapes and still life.
- Raphael Bronstein, 92, Lithuanian-born American violinist, stroke.
- Walter Coutts, 75, British colonial administrator, Governor-General of Uganda.
- Jean Gérault, 84, French Olympic long-distance runner (1928).
- Edward Thaxter Gignoux, 72, American judge (United States District Court for the District of Maine).
- Hermann Graf, 76, German World War II fighter ace.
- Ki. Va. Jagannathan, 82, Indian Tamil journalist, poet and writer.
- Ernest Lindner, 91, Austrian-born Canadian painter.
- Kimon Evan Marengo, 84, Egyptian-born British cartoonist.
- Nicholas Megura, 68, American USAAF WWII flying ace.
- André Ménard, 81, French Governor General in the French colonial empire.
- Henry Pelham-Clinton-Hope, 81, British peer and aviator, Duke of Newcastle.
- Michael Pomazansky, 99, Russian-born American theologian.
- Kleanthis Vikelidis, 73, Greek international footballer (Aris Thessaloniki, Greece).

=== 5 ===
- Mosher Joseph Blumenfeld, 84, American district judge (United States District Court for the District of Connecticut).
- Glenn Chapman, 82, American MLB player (Brooklyn Dodgers).
- C. F. Møller, 90, Danish architect.
- Jakoba Mulder, 88, Dutch architect and urban planner (Amsterdamse Bos).
- Albert Overton, 85, American Negro Leagues baseball player.
- Jean-Pierre Stirbois, 43, French far-right politician, member of the National Assembly, car crash.
- Claus Toksvig, 59, Danish journalist, broadcaster and politician.
- Rudolf Wirz, 70, Swiss Olympic handball player (1936).

=== 6 ===
- John Hubbard, 74, American television and film actor, kidney failure.
- Daniel Knox, 74, British Army officer, Governor of the Bahamas.
- Donald Wade, 84, British solicitor and politician, Member of Parliament.
- Tan Zheng, 82, Chinese general and Communist Party leader.

=== 7 ===
- Hans Baumann, 74, German poet and songwriter.
- Abram Belskie, 81, British-born American sculptor.
- Conrad Bernier, 84, French-Canadian organist, composer and conductor.
- Bill Hoest, 62, American cartoonist (The Lockhorns, Laugh Parade), lymphoma.
- Theodor V. Ionescu, 89, Romanian physicist and inventor (plasma physics).
- Morris Janowitz, 69, American sociologist and professor, Parkinson's disease.
- B. N. Kumar, Indian Army general, shot dead by militants.
- Ruth Lyons, 83, American radio and television broadcaster.
- Sy Mah, 62, Canadian long-distance runner, leukemia.
- Jean-Claude Paul, 49, Haitian military officer alleged to have been involved in the illegal drug trade in Haiti, believed to have been poisoned.

=== 8 ===
- Kingman Brewster Jr., 69, American diplomat, president of Yale University, ambassador to the U.K, brain haemorrhage.
- Warren Casey, 53, American composer, writer and actor (Grease), AIDS.
- Norm Nelson, 65, American racing driver.
- Oskar Rohr, 76, German international footballer (Strasbourg, Germany).

=== 9 ===
- Yves Baudrier, 82, French composer and Olympic sailor (1936).
- David Bauer, 64, Canadian ice hockey player and coach, pancreatic cancer.
- Billy Curtis, 79, American film and television actor (Little Cigars), heart attack.
- Clarke Hinkle, 79, American NFL footballer (Green Bay Packers).
- György Margó, 76, Hungarian Olympic field hockey player (1936).
- John N. Mitchell, 75, U.S. Attorney General, convicted for his role in the Watergate scandal, heart attack.
- Rosemary Timperley, 68, British novelist and screenwriter.
- Bob Weiland, 82, American MLB player (Chicago White Sox, Boston Red Sox, St. Louis Cardinals).
- Max-Eckart Wolff, 85, Nazi German naval commander.
- Richard S. Yeoman, 84, American commercial artist and coin collector, stroke.

=== 10 ===
- Ian Aston, 51, Australian rules footballer.
- Frederick Eccleston, 83, Australian cricketer.
- Alexandru Jar, 76, Romanian poet and prose writer.
- T. K. Rama Rao, 59, Indian Kannada novelist (Bangaarada Manushya).

=== 11 ===
- Charles Groves Wright Anderson, 91, South African-born Australian politician and soldier, member of Australian House of Representatives and Victoria Cross recipient.
- Frank Curcio, 75, Australian rules footballer (Fitzroy Lions).
- William Ifor Jones, 88, Welsh composer, conductor and organist.
- Peggy Parish, 61, American writer of children's books (Amelia Bedelia), abdominal aneurysm.

=== 12 ===
- Franco Angeli, 53, Italian artist, AIDS.
- Lev Aronson, 76, American cellist.
- Janika Balaž, 62, Yugoslavian tamburica musician and band leader.
- Ursula Graham Bower, 74, English anthropologist, guerrilla fighter against the Japanese.
- Vincent Buckley, 63, Australian poet and essayist, heart attack.
- Primo Conti, 88, Italian artist.
- Death Halladay, 88, American NFL player (Racine Legion).
- István Klimek, 75, Romanian footballer.
- Andrzej Kowerski, 76, Polish Army officer during World War II, cancer.
- Lyman Lemnitzer, 89, American general in the U.S. Army, Supreme Allied Commander Europe, kidney failure.
- Tomasz Sikorski, 48, Polish composer and pianist.

=== 13 ===
- Antal Doráti, 82, Hungarian-born American conductor (Minneapolis Symphony Orchestra).
- Vlad Georgescu, 51, Romanian historian, academic and political dissident, brain tumour.
- François Lanzi, 72, French-born British artist.
- Béla Perényi, 35, Hungarian international chess master, car crash.
- Mulugeta Seraw, 28, Ethiopian student.
- Jaromír Vejvoda, 86, Czech composer (Beer Barrel Polka).

=== 14 ===
- Julia Caba Alba, 86, Spanish actress.
- Olie Cordill, 72, American NFL player (Cleveland Rams).
- Giacomo Gaioni, 83, Italian Olympic cyclist (1928).
- Haywood S. Hansell, 85, American general in the U.S. Army Air Forces during World War II, heart failure.
- Edward Lee, 64–65, Chinese Olympic basketball player (1948).
- Davis Love Jr., 53, American professional golfer, plane crash.
- Takeo Miki, 81, Japanese politician, Prime Minister of Japan, cerebral hemorrhage.
- Haralan Popov, 81, Protestant minister, cancer.
- Augusta La Torre, 42, Peruvian communist, number two in command of Shining Path.

=== 15 ===
- Nell Dorr, 95, American photographer.
- Ieronymos I of Athens, 83, Greek monk, Archbishop of Athens.
- Johann Kastenberger, 30, Austrian marathon runner, bank robber and murderer, suicide.
- Mirko Kokotović, 75, Austro-Hungarian–born Yugoslavian international footballer (HŠK Građanski, Yugoslavia).
- Ernest Matthew Mickler, 48, American cookbook author, AIDS.
- Thomas Peirce, 71, Barbadian cricketer.
- Mona Washbourne, 84, English actress (Stevie, My Fair Lady).

=== 16 ===
- Henry Ciccarone, 50, American college lacrosse coach (Johns Hopkins), heart attack.
- Wera Engels, 83, German actress.
- Elgin Gates, 66, American hunter, firearms and ammunition technician.
- Johnny Hayes, 78, American Negro Leagues baseball player.
- Jennie Lee, 84, Scottish politician, Member of Parliament.
- Reginald Teague-Jones, 99, British political and intelligence officer.

=== 17 ===
- Ken Dow, 70, American NFL player (Washington Redskins).
- Sheilah Graham, 84, British-born American gossip columnist, heart failure.
- Michael Lambart, 77, British hereditary peer, commanding officer of the Shropshire Yeomanry.
- Ángel Reyes, 69, Cuban-born American violinist.

=== 18 ===
- Erwin Ackerknecht, 82, German-born American historian of medicine.
- Janet Gladys Aitken, 80, Canadian-born British aristocrat and socialite, director of the All England Jumping Course at Hickstead.
- Hans Frederiksen, 83, Danish Olympic wrestler (1936).
- Józef Korolkiewicz, 86, Polish painter and graph designer.
- Carl Pfeiffer, 80, American physician and biochemist, researcher of schizophrenia, heart attack.
- Anantrai Raval, 76, Indian writer and journalist.
- Lotte Stam-Beese, 85, German-Dutch architect and urban planner, led reconstruction of Rotterdam after World War II.

=== 19 ===
- Mirza Hameedullah Beg, 75, Indian politician, Chief Justice of India.
- Adolf Heuser, 81, German boxer, International Boxing Union light heavyweight champion.
- Khan Roshan Khan, 73–74, Pakistani historian and writer, president of the All-India Muslim League.
- Kid Lowe, 88, American Negro Leagues baseball player.
- Roland MacKenzie, 81, American golfer.
- Veljko Mandić, 64, Montenegrin actor.
- Christina Onassis, 37, American shipping magnate and heiress, heart attack.
- Peggy Parish, 61, American writer, abdominal aneurysm.
- Hamidur Rahman, 59–60, Bangladeshi artist and sculptor.

=== 20 ===
- Marian Fontowicz, 81, Polish Olympic footballer (1936).
- Alberto Guerrero, 85, Puerto Rican Olympic sports shooter (1952, 1968).
- Tyler Kent, 77, American diplomat, convicted of espionage.
- Nils Sønnevik, 77, Norwegian politician.
- Jenő Vincze, 80, Hungarian international footballer and manager (Bocskai, Újpest, Hungary).
- Felix Ziegel, 68, Soviet astronomer, stroke.

=== 21 ===
- Robert Bright, 86, American writer and illustrator of children's literature (Georgie), cancer.
- Tom Fraser, 77, Scottish coal miner and trade unionist, Member of Parliament, Under-Secretary of State for Scotland.
- Simon Grany, 89, French Olympic athlete (1920).
- Carl Hubbell, 85, American Major League baseball player (New York Giants), car crash due to stroke.
- Pál Kalmár, 88, Hungarian pop singer.
- Raymond Lewenthal, 65, American virtuoso pianist, heart attack.
- Theodora Llewelyn Davies, 90, British barrister, bronchopneumonia.
- Princess Sophie, 77, German princess of the House of Saxe-Weimar-Eisenach.

=== 22 ===
- Luis Barragán, 86, Mexican architect and engineer (Torres de Satélite).
- Cathy Carr, 52, American pop singer ("Ivory Tower"), ovarian cancer.
- Gordon Church, 28, American murder victim.
- Raymond Dart, 95, Australian anatomist and anthropologist (Australopithecus africanus), cerebral hemorrhage.
- Erich Fried, 67, Austrian-born British poet and writer, intestinal cancer.
- Pehr Gyllenhammar, 87, Swedish insurance company executive (Skandia).
- Ray Kelly, 74, American sportswriter (Philadelphia Bulletin).
- Hans Kruyt, 81, Dutch Olympic rower (1928).
- John C. Parkin, 66, British-born Canadian architect.
- John R. Ragazzini, 76, American electrical engineer, involved in Manhattan Project, heart failure.
- Josefina Vicens, 76, Mexican author, screenwriter and journalist.
- Terry Welch, 49, American computer scientist (Lempel–Ziv–Welch compression), brain tumour.
- Curt Wiberg, 90, Swedish Olympic sprinter (1924).

=== 23 ===
- Gamal Abdel-Rahim, 63, Egyptian classical music composer.
- F. D. Amr Bey, 79, Egyptian diplomat and squash player, multiple British Open winner, Egyptian ambassador to the U.K.
- Ludwig Franzisket, 71, German World War II Luftwaffe fighter ace.
- Hansraj Gupta, 86, Indian mathematician (partition function).
- Wieland Herzfelde, 92, German publisher and writer.
- Richard Lonsdale, 74, British Army officer in World War II.
- Kenzō Masaoka, 90, Japanese anime creator, co-founder of Toei Animation.
- Albert Raby, 54–55, American civil rights activist, heart attack.
- Marcia Ralston, 82, Australian-born American actress (The Ghost Train; Marcus Welby, M.D.).
- Kazem Sami, 52–53, Iranian politician, Minister of Health, murdered.
- Joe Schleimer, 79, Canadian Olympic wrestler (1936).
- Philip F. Tyler, 31, Irish actor and television presenter (Bosco).
- Jack White, 68, American stock car racing driver.

=== 24 ===
- Walter W. Bankhead, 91, American politician, member of the U.S. House of Representatives (1941).
- Mary Cavendish, 93, Mistress of the Robes to Queen Elizabeth II, Duchess of Devonshire.
- John William Corrington, 56, American film writer (Battle for the Planet of the Apes, General Hospital), and novelist.
- Benigno Ferrera, 95, Italian Olympic cross-country skier (1924).
- Bernard Leene, 85, Dutch Olympic track cyclist (1928, 1932, 1936).
- Harris McDowell, 82, American politician, member of the U.S. House of Representatives (1955–1957, 1959–1967), stroke.
- Lukáš Mihalák, 80, Slovak Olympic cross-country skier (1936).
- Andreas Ostler, 67, German Olympic bobsledder (1952, 1956).
- Bo Rhambo, 65, American trumpeter and tenor saxophonist.
- Irmgard Seefried, 69, German soprano, cancer.
- Jenő Szűcs, 60, Hungarian historian.

=== 25 ===
- Eddie Cameron, 86, American footballer and basketballer.
- Alphaeus Philemon Cole, 112, American artist, engraver and super-centenarian, heart failure.
- Rolf Jørgen Fuglesang, 79, Norwegian secretary to the Quisling government.
- Jack Leslie, 87, English footballer (Plymouth Argyle).
- Muhammad bin Abdulaziz Al Saud, 78, Crown Prince of Saudi Arabia.
- Robert Voigt, 75, Danish Olympic wrestler (1936).

=== 26 ===
- Hans Baron, 88, German-born American historian (civic humanism).
- Albert Barthélémy, 82, French racing cyclist.
- John Dahmer, 51, Canadian politician, member of the House of Commons (1988), cancer.
- Antonio Estévez, 72, Venezuelan musician, composer and conductor.
- Baron Michele Leone, 79, Italian-born American professional wrestler, struck by car.
- John Loder, 90, British film actor.
- Hugh Oldman, 74, British Army officer, Secretary for Defence of the Sultanate of Oman.
- Bent Peder Rasch, 54, Danish Olympic sprint canoeist (1952).

=== 27 ===
- Angela Aames, 32, American B Movie actress, heart virus.
- Carlos Botín, 88, Spanish Olympic sprinter (1920).
- John Carradine, 82, American actor (House of Frankenstein, The Grapes of Wrath), heart and kidney failure.
- Bill Dalkin, 67, Australian rules footballer.
- Jan Hein Donner, 61, Dutch chess grandmaster and writer, gastric hemorrhage.
- Max Fox, 76, Australian politician, member of the Australian House of Representatives (1955–1974).
- George Kelly, 80, Irish Olympic boxer (1928).
- Yasin Osman Kenadid, 68–69, Somalian writer.
- Wilfred "Chicken" Smallhorn, 77, Australian rules footballer (Fitzroy).
- Takieddin el-Solh, 79–80, Lebanese politician, Prime Minister of Lebanon, heart attack.
- Victor Hubert Tait, 96, Canadian-born British RAF officer and Olympic Ice hockey player (1928).

=== 28 ===
- Gus Bailey, 37, American NBA basketballer (Houston Rockets, New Orleans Jazz), murdered.
- Nuri Boytorun, 80, Turkish Olympic wrestler (1928, 1936).
- Robert E. Cook, 68, American attorney, politician, and judge, member of the United States House of Representatives (1959–1963).
- Butch Davis, 72, American Negro Leagues baseball player.
- Daniil Kazakevich, 85, Soviet Red Army officer, recipient of the Hero of the Soviet Union.
- Leonid Lubennikov, 78, Soviet politician, Deputy of the Supreme Soviet of the Soviet Union.
- Robert Stewart, 82, New Zealand Olympic sailor (1956).
- Håkon Walde, 81, Norwegian footballer.
- Edward Ronald Walker, 81, Australian diplomat, Australia's representative to the UN and ambassador to three countries.

=== 29 ===
- Nils Bejerot, 67, Swedish psychiatrist and criminologist (Stockholm syndrome), lymphoma.
- Tom Harrington, 80, Australian rules footballer.
- Donald Keyhoe, 91, American Marine Corps naval aviator, "UFO" researcher, pneumonia and cardiac arrest.
- George Lemin, 83, New Zealand cricketer.
- Elof Lindström, 90, Swedish Olympic javelin thrower (1920).
- Yevsey Moiseyenko, 72, Soviet painter.
- Ted Rosequist, 80, American NFL player (Chicago Bears, Cleveland Rams).
- Heinrich Schmidt, 84, Austrian composer.
- Mabel Strickland, 89, Maltese journalist, newspaper proprietor and politician, co-founder of the Times of Malta.
- Isabella von Thurn, 26, Austrian model and socialite, princess of the House of Hanover, overdose.

=== 30 ===
- Abdul Basit 'Abd us-Samad, 60–61, Egyptian Quran reciter and Hafiz.
- Martín Alarcón, 59, Argentine football player.
- Wally Berger, 83, American Major League baseball player (Boston Braves), stroke.
- Tom Dahms, 61, American NFL player and coach (Los Angeles Rams).
- Aleksandar Deroko, 94, Serbian architect, artist and author.
- Edward H. Feldman, 68, American director and producer (Hogan's Heroes), heart disease.
- Pannonica de Koenigswarter, 74, British-born American jazz patron, Free French fighter and writer, heart failure.
- Ricky Lawless, 28, American professional wrestler, murdered.
- Henrique Medina, 87, Portuguese painter (The Picture of Dorian Gray).
- Margaret Mee, 79, British botanical artist, car crash.
- Amiram Nir, 37, Israeli journalist, air crash.
- Paul Peter Rao, 89, American judge.
- M. K. Rocksamy, 56, Sri Lankan musician.
- Charlie Rouse, 64, American tenor saxophonist and flautist, lung cancer.
- István Szabácsy, 62, Hungarian Olympic equestrian (1972).

=== Unknown date ===
- Aper Aku, 49–50, Nigerian governor of Benue State.
- Romola Costantino, 58, Australian pianist, cancer.
