= Deaths in September 1991 =

The following is a list of notable deaths in September 1991.

Entries for each day are listed alphabetically by surname. A typical entry lists information in the following sequence:

- Name, age, country of citizenship at birth, subsequent country of citizenship (if applicable), reason for notability, cause of death (if known), and reference.

== September 1991 ==
=== 1 ===
- Otl Aicher, 69, German graphic designer and typographer, traffic collision.
- Don Campbell, 74, American football player (Pittsburgh Pirates/Steelers).
- Allan Grossman, 80, Canadian politician, cancer.
- Luis Negrón López, 82, Puerto Rican politician.
- Hannibal Valdimarsson, 88, Icelandic politician.

=== 2 ===
- Arnold Chernushevich, 58, Soviet fencer and Olympic medalist (1956, 1960).
- František Hanus, 75, Czech actor.
- Laura Riding, 90, American writer, cardiac arrest.
- Alfonso García Robles, 80, Mexican diplomat, Nobel Prize recipient (1982).
- Henri Van Poucke, 85, Belgian footballer.

=== 3 ===
- Jean Bourgoin, 78, French cinematographer (The Longest Day), Oscar winner (1963).
- Frank Capra, 94, Italian-American film director (It's a Wonderful Life, Mr. Smith Goes to Washington, It Happened One Night), Oscar winner (1935, 1937, 1939), heart attack.
- Eduardo Cordero, 69, Chilean Olympic basketball player (1948, 1952).
- Falk Harnack, 78, German film director.
- Daniel Prenn, 86, Polish-German-British tennis player, Alzheimer's disease.
- Chico Renfroe, 68, American baseball player.

=== 4 ===
- Charlie Barnet, 77, American jazz musician.
- Henri de Lubac, 95, French cardinal.
- Azellus Denis, 84, Canadian politician.
- Knud Hallest, 82, Danish film actor.
- Tom Tryon, 65, American actor and novelist, stomach cancer.
- Dottie West, 58, American country singer, complications from a traffic collision.

=== 5 ===
- Loyd Christopher, 71, American baseball player (Boston Red Sox, Chicago Cubs, Chicago White Sox).
- Raymond Dronne, 83, French resistance fighter during World War II.
- Sharad Joshi, 60, Indian poet, writer, and satirist.
- Carol Kalish, 36, American writer, editor, and comic book retailer, intracranial aneurysm.
- Åke Nilsson, 63, Swedish Olympic alpine skier (1948, 1952, 1956).
- Alexander Pushnin, 70, Soviet painter.
- Peter Slaghuis, 30, Dutch DJ, record producer and remixer, traffic collision.
- Princess Fahrelnissa Zeid, 90, Turkish artist.

=== 6 ===
- Eugene Bolden, 92, American Olympic swimmer (1920).
- Donald Henry Gaskins, 58, American convicted serial killer, execution by electric chair.
- Bob Goldham, 69, Canadian ice hockey player (Toronto Maple Leafs, Chicago Black Hawks, Detroit Red Wings).
- Mohamad Noah Omar, 93, Malaysian politician.
- Alfredo Rizzo, 89, Italian actor.
- Alois Sokol, 77, Czech Olympic fencer (1948).
- Robert Stoller, 66, American psychiatrist and researcher, traffic collision.

=== 7 ===
- Buddy Banks, 81, American jazz tenor saxophonist, pianist, and bandleader.
- Héctor-Neri Castañeda, 66, Guatemalan-American philosopher and publisher.
- John Crosby, 79, American media critic, cancer.
- John H. Lawrence, 87, American physicist.
- Edwin McMillan, 83, American physicist, first to synthesize neptunium, Nobel Prize recipient (1951), complications of diabetes mellitus.
- Chintaman Govind Pandit, 96, Indian virologist and writer.
- Haakon Pedersen, 84, Norwegian Norwegian Olympic speed skater (1928, 1932).
- Ben Piazza, 58, American actor (Mask, Santa Barbara, The Blues Brothers), AIDS-related cancer.
- Ravi Narayana Reddy, 83, Indian communist politician and peasant leader.
- Reg Richards, 73, Australian rules footballer.

=== 8 ===
- Odd Bull, 84, Norwegian Air Force general.
- Brad Davis, 41, American actor (Midnight Express, Chariots of Fire, Querelle), assisted suicide.
- Gordon Gunson, 87, English footballer.
- Latif Karimov, 84, Azerbaijani artist.
- Clem Koshorek, 66, American baseball player (Pittsburgh Pirates).
- Frank Neenan, 77, Australian rules footballer.
- Alex North, 80, American film composer (A Streetcar Named Desire, Spartacus, Cleopatra), Emmy winner (1976).
- Luigi Pareyson, 73, Italian philosopher.
- Hans Pointner, 82, Austrian Olympic wrestler (1936).
- Mack Reynolds, 56, American gridiron football player.
- Lou Rosenberg, 87, American baseball player (Chicago White Sox).

=== 9 ===
- Concetto Lo Bello, 67, Italian football referee and politician.
- Åke Holmberg, 84, Swedish writer and translator.
- Efraim Racker, 78, Austrian biochemist, stroke.
- Les Rock, 79, American baseball player (Chicago White Sox).
- Henri H. Stahl, 90, Romanian marxist cultural anthropologist and social historian.

=== 10 ===
- Jack Crawford, 83, Australian tennis player.
- Jan Józef Lipski, 65, Polish writer and politician.
- Gordon Maffina, 65, Australian rules footballer.
- Eila Pehkonen, 66, Finnish actress.
- António Reis, 64, Portuguese film director, screenwriter, and producer.
- Michel Soutter, 59, Swiss film director and screenwriter, cancer.
- Herbie Tonkes, 70, Australian rules footballer.

=== 11 ===
- Gail Borden, 84, American figure skater and Olympian (1932).
- Lois Florreich, 64, American baseball player.
- Rudy Gollomb, 79, American football player (Philadelphia Eagles).
- Rudolf Kaiser, 69, German aerospace engineer.
- Iosif Lengheriu, 77, Romanian football player.
- Wera Liessem, 78, German actress.
- Ernie Nunn, 86, Australian rules footballer.
- Frank Perantoni, 67, American football player.
- Viktor Tegelhoff, 72, Slovak football player and coach.
- María Guillermina Valdes Villalva, 51, American scholar and activist, plane crash.

=== 12 ===
- Sir Ewan Forbes, 11th Baronet, 79, Scottish nobleman, general practitioner and farmer.
- Saburo Date, 67, Japanese actor.
- Milton Harris, 85, American chemist.
- Franz Keller, 78, Swiss psychologist.
- Feliks Konarski, 84, Polish poet, songwriter, and cabaret performer.
- Bruce Matthews, 82, Canadian army officer.
- Chris Von Erich, 21, American professional wrestler, suicide.
- Joseph Wirtz, 79, French Olympic hammer thrower (1936).
- Harland G. Wood, 84, American biochemist.

=== 13 ===
- Orlando Asbury, 94, American baseball player.
- Baruch Ashlag, 84, Polish rabbi.
- Michael Harrison, 84, English detective and fantasy writer.
- Robert Irving, 78, British conductor.
- Huy Kanthoul, 82, Cambodian politician, Prime Minister.
- Erich Kern, 85, Austrian journalist, nazi propagandist during World War II, and a post-war neo-nazi.
- Metin Oktay, 55, Turkish football player, traffic collision.
- Joe Pasternak, 89, Hungarian-American film director, Parkinson's disease.
- Paul Thompson, 84, Canadian ice hockey player (New York Rangers, Chicago Black Hawks).

=== 14 ===
- Liu Dagang, 87, Chinese chemist.
- Julie Bovasso, 61, American actress (Saturday Night Fever, The Verdict, Moonstruck), cancer.
- Heinz Budde, 65, German politician and member of the Bundestag.
- Mieczysław Czechowicz, 60, Polish actor.
- John King Fairbank, 84, American historian.
- Moshe Goshen-Gottstein, 66, German-Israeli linguist.
- Russell Johnson, 71, American Olympic sports shooter (1976).
- Russell Lynes, 80, American art historian.
- Andy Nacrelli, 58, American football player (Philadelphia Eagles).

=== 15 ===
- Garnett Bankhead, 63, American baseball player.
- André Baruch, 83, French-American radio host, narrator, and sportscaster.
- Antoine Blavier, 77, Belgian football referee.
- Đorđe Božović, 35, Serbian mobster and war commander, shot.
- Otto Buggisch, 81, German mathematician.
- Petronella Burgerhof, 82, Dutch Olympic gymnast (1928).
- Smoky Burgess, 64, American baseball player.
- John Hoyt, 85, American actor (Blackboard Jungle, Julius Caesar, When Worlds Collide), lung cancer.
- Luis Miró, 78, Spanish footballer.
- Charles E. Osgood, 74, American psychologist and academic.
- K. H. Scheer, 63, German science fiction writer.
- Sulkhan Tsintsadze, 66, Georgian composer.

=== 16 ===
- Ernest Davies, 89, British journalist, author and politician.
- Ronald DeWolf, 57, American writer and critic of scientology, diabetes.
- Alan McInnes, 84, Australian cricketer.
- Murilo Rubião, 75, Brazilian writer.
- Olga Spessivtseva, 96, Russian ballerina.
- Carol White, 48, English actress (Poor Cow, I'll Never Forget What's'isname, The Fixer).

=== 17 ===
- Bernhard Bischoff, 84, German historian, paleographer, and philologist.
- Zino Francescatti, 89, French violinist.
- Frank H. Netter, 85, American surgeon.
- Song Shi-Lun, 84, Chinese general.
- John Tocher, 65, British trade unionist and communist activist.

=== 18 ===
- Leland Bell, 68, American painter, leukemia.
- John Anthony Donovan, 80, Canadian-American Roman Catholic bishop, heart ailment.
- Martin Norberg, 88, Swedish Olympic water polo player (1924).
- Harry Sandbach, 88, British academic.
- Kevin R. Smith, 59, Australian rules footballer.
- Rob Tyner, 46, American singer (MC5), heart attack.

=== 19 ===
- Lydia Cabrera, 92, Cuban-American ethnographer.
- Eurico de Freitas, 89, Brazilian Olympic athlete (1924).
- LeRoy Lemke, 55, American politician and lawyer.
- Theodore McEvoy, 86, British Royal Air Force officer.

=== 20 ===
- Ricardo Arredondo, 42, Mexican boxer.
- Anton Besold, 87, German politician.
- Jack Chase, 86, Irish Olympic boxer (1928).
- Richard Holt, 60, British politician.
- Chet Morgan, 81, American baseball player (Detroit Tigers) and manager.
- Steve Peek, 77, American baseball player (New York Yankees).
- Louis Clyde Stoumen, 74, American photographer, film director and producer, cancer.
- Seiichirō Tsuda, 85, Japanese long-distance runner and Olympian (1928, 1932).

=== 21 ===
- Gordon Bashford, 75, British automotive designer.
- Paul Henry Lang, 90, Hungarian-American musicologist and music critic.
- Henri Lemoine, 82, French cyclist and Olympian (1928).
- Mirza Masood, 82, Indian field hockey player and Olympic champion (1936).
- Ante Paradžik, 48, Croatian politician, assassinated.
- Angelo Rossitto, 83, American actor (Freaks).
- Álvaro, 59, Brazilian football player and manager.

=== 22 ===
- Tino Casal, 41, Spanish singer, songwriter and producer, traffic collision.
- Ray Cillien, 52, Luxembourgish Olympic boxer (1960).
- Louis Dugauguez, 73, French football player and football manager.
- Yevgeni Ivanovski, 73, Soviet general.
- Durga Khote, 86, Indian actress.
- Fons Steuten, 53, Dutch cyclist.

=== 23 ===
- Charles V. Dingley, 51, American pornographic film and B movie producer, screenwriter, and director.
- Harriet Hammond, 91, American silent film actress.
- Yue-Kong Pao, 72, Hong Kong businessman.
- Harold Phelps, 88, American Olympic long-distance runner (1924).
- Keith Robertson, 77, American writer, cancer.
- Philippus Vethaak, 76, Dutch Olympic cyclist (1936).

=== 24 ===
- Yusif Aliyev, 21, Azerbaijani soldier and war hero, killed in action.
- Bolesław Banaś, 79, Polish Olympic fencer (1948).
- Peter Bellamy, 47, English singer, suicide.
- Wilhelm Hennings, 86, Dutch Olympic sprinter (1928).
- Mary Lawrence, 73, American actress, pneumonia.
- Johnny Lenhart, 75, American basketball player.
- Dom Orejudos, 58, American choreographer, AIDS.
- Dr. Seuss, 87, American children's author (The Cat in the Hat, How the Grinch Stole Christmas!, Green Eggs and Ham), cancer.
- Joyce Steele, 82, Australian politician.

=== 25 ===
- LeRoy H. Anderson, 85, American politician, member of the U.S. House of Representatives (1957–1961).
- Ilse Kishauer, 85, German Olympic figure skater (1928).
- Bob Prichard, 73, American baseball player (Washington Senators).
- Viviane Romance, 79, French actress.
- Anita Traversi, 54, Swiss singer.
- Stanley Waters, 71, Canadian politician.
- Ted A. Wells, 84, American aircraft engineer.

=== 26 ===
- Leonard J. Chabert, 58, American politician.
- Helmut Kohl, 48, Austrian football referee and butcher, cancer.
- Benjamin A. Smith II, 75, American politician, member of the U.S. Senate (1960–1962).
- Billy Vaughn, 72, American singer, peritoneal carcinoma.

=== 27 ===
- Roy Fuller, 79, English writer.
- Garry Glenn, 36, American songwriter, kidney failure.
- Richard Goldner, 83, Romanian-Australian violist, pedagogue and inventor.
- Floyd Huddleston, 73, American songwriter, screenwriter, and television producer.
- Joe Hulme, 87, English football player and cricket player.
- Stefan Kisielewski, 80, Polish writer, composer and politician.
- Karl-Heinz Köpcke, 68, German journalist and news presenter (Tagesschau), cancer.
- Eryk Lipiński, 83, Polish artist.
- Oona O'Neill, 66, American socialite, widow of Charlie Chaplin, pancreatic cancer.
- Jean-Thomas Richard, 84, Canadian politician, member of the House of Commons of Canada (1945-1972).
- Roberto Rojas, 35, Peruvian football player, traffic collision.
- Alois Vansteenkiste, 63, Belgian racing cyclist.
- Øyvind Vennerød, 72, Norwegian filmmaker.

=== 28 ===
- Eugène Bozza, 86, French composer and violinist.
- Sir Clifford Campbell, 99, Jamaican politician, governor-general (1962–1973).
- Olin Hatfield Chilson, 87, American district judge of the American District Court for the District of Colorado.
- James P. Coleman, 77, American circuit judge and Governor of Mississippi (1956-1960).
- Miles Davis, 65, American jazz musician, intracerebral hemorrhage.
- Ellic Howe, 81, British author.
- Barbara Rose Johns, 56, American civil rights activist, bone cancer.
- Peter McKennan, 73, Scottish football player.
- Shankar Guha Niyogi, 48, Indian labor leader, murdered.
- Dilgo Khyentse Tashi Peljor, 81, Bhutanese Buddhist spiritual teacher and poet.
- A. L. Philpott, 72, American politician.
- Vezey Raffety, 85, English cricketer.

=== 29 ===
- Zelimir Bakša, 34, Yugoslav People's Army officer, killed in action.
- Henry Joseph Kelliher, 95, New Zealand businessman.
- Roger Lafontant, 60, Haitian military leader and politician.
- Graham Minihan, 57, Australian rules footballer.
- Ed Moriarty, 78, American baseball player (Boston Braves/Bees).
- Stojadin Mirković, 19, Yugoslav People's Army conscript, killed in action.
- Lou Nova, 78, American boxer and actor, cancer.
- Grace Zaring Stone, 100, American novelist and short-story writer.
- Yury Veksler, 51, Soviet and Russian cinematographer.

=== 30 ===
- Osman Alyanak, 79-80, Turkish actor and footballer.
- Sven Barthel, 88, Swedish writer, journalist, theatre critic and translator.
- Shmuel Gonen, 61, Israeli general.
- William Albert Hiltner, 77, American astronomer.
- King Levinsky, 81, American heavyweight boxer.
- Nancy Welford, 87, British-American actress.
- Toma Zdravković, 52, Yugoslav singer, prostate cancer.
- Claire Zeisler, 88, American fiber artist.
