= Deaths in June 1997 =

The following is a list of notable deaths in June 1997.

Entries for each day are listed alphabetically by surname. A typical entry lists information in the following sequence:

- Name, age, country of citizenship at birth, subsequent country of citizenship (if applicable), reason for notability, cause of death (if known), and reference.

== June 1997 ==
=== 1 ===
- Florence Wysinger Allen, 84, African American artists' model.
- Ruth Atkinson, 78, American cartoonist, cancer.
- Garland T. Byrd, 72, American politician from Georgia.
- Giorgos P. Livanos, 70, Greek-American shipping magnate.
- Fred Rauch, 87, Austrian singer and songwriter.
- Mickey Rocco, 81, American baseball player (Cleveland Indians).
- Bernard Segal, 89, American lawyer civil rights activist, cancer.
- Robert Serber, 88, American physicist, brain cancer.
- Irvin Studer, 96, Canadian politician, member of the House of Commons of Canada (1949-1958).
- Nikolai Tikhonov, 92, Soviet Russian-Ukrainian statesman.

=== 2 ===
- Lukas Aurednik, 79, Austrian football player and football manager.
- Zhenya Belousov, 32, Soviet/Ukrainian pop singer, stroke.
- Martin Bronfenbrenner, 82, American economist.
- Doc Cheatham, 91, American jazz trumpeter, singer, and bandleader.
- Corwin Clatt, 73, American gridiron football player (Chicago Cardinals).
- Louise Huntington, 92, American actress.
- Helen Jacobs, 88, American tennis champion, heart failure.
- William Alexander Levy, 87, American architect.
- Kenneth McNaught, 78, Canadian historian.
- Nikolai Ozerov, 74, Soviet tennis player and actor.
- Eddie Thomas, 70, Welsh boxer and manager, cancer.
- Ida Turay, 89, Hungarian film actress.

=== 3 ===
- Pidge Browne, 68, American baseball player (Houston Colt .45s).
- Salvatore Fiume, 81, Italian painter, sculptor, architect and writer.
- John Holt, 73, Jamaican cricket player.
- Dennis James, 79, American television personality and philanthropist, lung cancer.
- Meenakshi Shirodkar, 80, Indian actress.

=== 4 ===
- Thomas Boylston Adams, 86, American business executive and writer.
- Katherine Esau, 99, German-American botanist.
- Robert E. Jones Jr., 84, American politician, member of the United States House of Representatives (1947-1977).
- Ronnie Lane, 51, English musician, songwriter, and producer, pneumonia.
- Johnny "Hammond" Smith, 63, American soul jazz and hard bop organist, cancer.
- Pedro Zaballa, 58, Spanish football player.

=== 5 ===
- Jack Wilson Evans, 74, American politician and mayor of Dallas, Texas, cancer.
- Elaine Ryan Hedges, 69, American feminist.
- Olga Kirsch, 72, South African and Israeli poet, brain tumor, brain cancer.
- J. Anthony Lukas, 64, American journalist and author, suicide by hanging.
- Gustav Richter, 84, German SS officer and aide to Adolf Eichmann during World War II.

=== 6 ===
- Eitel Cantoni, 90, Uruguayan racecar driver.
- Jeffrey Ethell, 49-50, American author and pilot, plane crash.
- Magda Gabor, 81, Hungarian-American actress and socialite, and sister of Zsa Zsa and Eva Gabor, kidney failure.
- Monica Golding, 94, British Army nurse and nursing administrator.
- Jack Gravell, 83, Australian rules footballer.
- Charles Jones, 86, Canadian-American composer of contemporary classical music.
- Hannu Leminen, 87, Finnish film director, set designer and screenwriter.
- Ted Nathanson, 72, American television director, lung cancer.
- Richard Neilson, 59, British diplomat.
- Eero Salminen, 63, Finnish Olympic high jumper (1960).
- Liao Shantao, 77, Chinese mathematician.
- Alangudi Somu, 64, Indian Tamil film lyricist.

=== 7 ===
- Raghu Raj Bahadur, 73, Indian statistician.
- Lewis White Beck, 83, American philosopher and scholar of German philosophy.
- Jacques Canetti, 88, French music executive and talent manager.
- Victor Codron, 82, French cyclist.
- Stan Goletz, 79, American baseball player (Chicago White Sox).
- Paul Reade, 54, English composer.
- Stanley Schachter, 75, American social psychologist, colon cancer.
- Nadezhda Simonyan, 75, Soviet and Russian composer.
- Glyn Worsnip, 57, British radio presenter.

=== 8 ===
- Betty Andujar, 84, American civic activist and politician.
- Norman Cleaveland, 96, American rugby player and Olympian (1924).
- Ken Hunt, 62, American baseball player (New York Yankees, Los Angeles Angels, Washington Senators).
- Park Jaesam, 64, Korean poet.
- Reid Shelton, 72, American actor, stroke.
- George Turner, 80, Australian writer and critic.
- Amos Tutuola, 76, Nigerian writer, diabetes.
- Karen Wetterhahn, 48, American professor of chemistry, mercury poisoning.
- Gordon Wilson, 81, American football player.

=== 9 ===
- Károly Bajkó, 52, Hungarian Olympic wrestler (1964, 1968, 1972).
- Robert W. Hansen, 86, American lawyer and jurist.
- Ismael Huerta, 80, Chilean admiral and politician, cardiac embolism.
- Stanley Knowles, 88, Canadian politician.
- Yevgeni Lebedev, 80, Soviet and Russian film and theater actor.
- Thornton Lee, 90, American baseball player (Cleveland Indians, Chicago White Sox, New York Giants).
- Witness Lee, 91-92, Chinese christian preacher and hymnist, cancer.
- V.L. Nakum, 72, Indian cricketer.

=== 10 ===
- Hilton de Almeida, 64, Brazilian Olympic water polo player (1960).
- Carolina Cotton, 71, American singer and actress, ovarian cancer.
- Leo Fuld, 84, Dutch singer.
- Kim Ki-soo, 57, South Korean boxing champion and Olympian (1960), liver cancer.
- Ernst Krebs, 82, Swiss Olympic wrestler (1936).
- Zhou Lin, 85, Chinese politician.
- Renato Reyes, 52, Filipino basketball player and Olympian (1968).

=== 11 ===
- Herman Basudde, 38, Ugandan kadongo kamu musician, traffic accident.
- Robert Bates, 48, Northern Irish Ulster loyalist, shot.
- Noel Burrows, 86, Australian rules footballer.
- Thalassa Cruso, 88, British-American presenter and author on horticulture, Alzheimer's disease.
- Ben Dunkelman, 83, Canadian-Israeli military officer, heart attack.
- Gonzalo Fonseca, 74, Uruguayan artist, stroke.
- Ralph Kohl, 73, American football player, coach and scout.
- Jakob Nirschl, 72, German bobsledder and Olympian (1956).
- Satyanarayan Rajguru, 93, Indian litterateur, epigraphist and historian.
- Mihir Sen, 66, Indian long distance swimmer, combination of Alzheimer's and Parkinson's disease.
- Kurt Stöpel, 89, German road bicycle racer.
- Lütfiye Sultan, 87, Turkish Ottoman princess.
- Yrjö Uimonen, 65, Finnish Olympic speed skater (1956).

=== 12 ===
- Jo Backaert, 75, Belgian football player.
- Rick Baldwin, 42, American racing driver, racing accident.
- Pieter d'Hont, 80, Dutch sculptor.
- Colette Magny, 70, French singer and songwriter.
- Vittorio Mussolini, 80, Italian film critic and producer.
- Bulat Okudzhava, 73, Soviet/Russian poet, writer, musician, and singer-songwriter.
- André Prébolin, 91, French Olympic long jumper (1936).
- Arnaldo Sentimenti, 83, Italian football player and coach.
- Veikko Vennamo, 84, Finnish politician.
- Joe Ben Wheat, 81, American archaeologist and author.

=== 13 ===
- Al Berto, 49, Portuguese poet and painter, lymphoma.
- Ladislau Bonyhádi, 74, Romanian football player of Hungarian ethnicity.
- Fredrik Hultén, 30, Swedish Olympic rower (1988, 1992, 1996).
- Anand Narain Mulla, 95, Indian Urdu poet.
- George Strugar, 63. American gridiron football player (Los Angeles Rams, Pittsburgh Steelers, New York Titans/Jets), lung cancer.

=== 14 ===
- Marjorie Best, 94, American costume designer (Giant, Rio Bravo, The Greatest Story Ever Told, Oscar winner (1950).
- Helmut Fischer, 70, German actor, carcinoma.
- Jean Fournel, 40, Canadian Olympic canoeist (1976).
- Richard Jaeckel, 70, American actor (The Dirty Dozen, Sometimes a Great Notion. Starman), melanoma.
- Dorothy Prior, 85, Canadian Olympic swimmer (1928, 1932).
- Helena Sanders, 86, British India-born British cultural activist, politician, poet, and activist for feline welfare, she was both the founder and the first leader of the Cornish political party Mebyon Kernow (MK), she won a seat on the Camborne–Redruth Urban District Council in 1953

=== 15 ===
- Nicholas Danby, British organist and composer.
- George Denholm, 88, British flying ace during World War II.
- Frode Jakobsen, 90, Danish author and politician.
- Bill Lawrence, 91, American baseball player (Detroit Tigers).
- Edmond Leburton, 82, Belgian politician and Prime Minister.
- Robert C. McEwen, 77, American politician, member of the United States House of Representatives (1965-1981).
- Attilio Redolfi, 73, Italian-French racing cyclist.
- Son Sen, 67, Cambodian communist politician and soldier, summary execution.
- Dal Stivens, 85, Australian writer.

=== 16 ===
- Bill Barwick, 92, Australian Olympic middle-distance runner (1932).
- Mariya Batrakova, 74, Soviet and Russian Red Army officer and Hero of the Soviet Union.
- Rolf Ericson, 74, Swedish jazz trumpeter.
- Badi-ud-din Mahmud, 92, Sri Lankan politician.
- Elizabeth McBride, 42, American costume designer (Driving Miss Daisy, Thelma & Louise, The Shawshank Redemption), cancer.
- Michael O'Herlihy, 68, Irish television producer and director.
- Sukumaran, 49, Indian film actor and producer, heart attack.
- Sue Sumii, 95, Japanese social reformer, writer, and novelist.
- Tom Søndergaard, 53, Danish football player.
- Inge Wersin-Lantschner, 92, Austrian alpine skier and world champion.
- Andrzej Wojciechowski, 64, Polish Olympic boxer (1956).

=== 17 ===
- Frances Foster, 73, American film, television and stage actress, cerebral hemorrhage.
- Bernhard Jensen, 85, Danish flatwater canoeist and Olympian (1948).
- Maurice Rootes, 80, British film editor.
- Hari Krishna Shastri, 59, Indian politician.

=== 18 ===
- Waldo Don Carlos, 87, American football player (Green Bay Packers).
- James Willard Hurst, 86, American legal scholar and law history pioneer, cancer.
- Lev Kopelev, 85, Soviet author and dissident.
- Devon Russell, Jamaican rocksteady and reggae singer and record producer, brain tumour.
- Arvid Syrrist, 92, Norwegian footballer.
- Cândido Tavares, 85, Portuguese football goalkeeper and manager.
- José María Fernández Unsáin, 78, Argentine film director, screenwriter, and playwright.
- C. Martin Wilbur, 89, American historian and professor at Columbia University.
- Héctor Yazalde, 51, Argentine footballer, heart failure.

=== 19 ===
- Basu Bhattacharya, Indian film director, acute pancreatitis.
- Robert Francis Byrnes, 79, American professor of history, heart attack.
- Jiří David, 74, Czech Olympic sprinter (1952).
- Cathleen Delany, 89, Irish actress.
- Olga Georges-Picot, 57, French actress, suicide.
- Thurman Green, 56, American jazz trombonist.
- Bobby Helms, 63, American country music singer, emphysema and asthma.
- Robert Henrion, 81, Belgian politician and Olympic fencer (1952).
- Ed Scheiwe, 79, American basketball player.
- Julia Smith, 70, English television director and producer, cancer.
- Stan Stasiak, 60, Canadian professional wrestler known as Stan Stasiak, heart failure.

=== 20 ===
- John Akii-Bua, 47, Ugandan hurdler and the nation's first Olympic champion (1972, 1980).
- Armando Brancia, 79, Italian film and television actor.
- Paul Carell, 85, German Nazi politician and propagandist.
- Henri Haest, 70, Belgian Olympic hammer thrower (1952).
- Cahit Külebi, 80, Turkish poet and author, cancer.
- John Michael Macdonald, 91, Canadian politician.
- Lawrence Payton, 59, American tenor, songwriter, musician, and record producer, liver cancer.
- Alberto Rivera, 61, Spanish anti-Catholic religious activist, colon cancer.
- William Thoburn, 90, Canadian Olympic rower (1932).

=== 21 ===
- Eusebio Hernández, 85, Chilean Olympic basketball player (1936).
- Shintarō Katsu, 65, Japanese actor, singer, producer, and director, pharyngeal cancer.
- Bill Lane, 80, American basketball player.
- Shantilal Jamnadas Mehta, 92, Indian surgeon and medical academic.
- Werner Mensching, 63, German figure skater and Olympian (1960).
- Arthur Prysock, 68, American jazz and R&B singer.
- Karl Ridderbusch, 65, German operatic bass.
- Fidel Velázquez Sánchez, 97, Mexican union leader, cardiac and respiratory failure.
- Vladimir Vinogradov, 75, Soviet diplomat.
- Don Vosberg, 77, American football player (New York Giants).

=== 22 ===
- Lars Bergendahl, 88, Norwegian cross-country skier.
- William Slater Brown, 100, American novelist, biographer, and translator of French literature.
- Larry Grossman, 53, Canadian politician (Legislative Assembly of Ontario), brain cancer.
- Ted Gärdestad, 41, Swedish singer, songwriter, musician, and actor, suicide.
- Don Henderson, 65, English actor (Star Wars, The Paradise Club, Strangers), throat cancer.
- Paul Napolitano, 74, American basketball player (Minneapolis Lakers).
- Gérard Pelletier, 78, Canadian journalist and politician.

=== 23 ===
- Jakob Balzert, 79, German footballer.
- Tom Calder, 79, Australian rules football player.
- Rosina Lawrence, 84, British-Canadian actress and singer, cancer.
- Prince Nico Mbarga, 47, Nigerian Igbo highlife musician, motorcycle accident.
- Don Norton, 59, American gridiron football player (Los Angeles/San Diego Chargers).
- Betty Shabazz, 63, American civil rights advocate and widow of Malcolm X, burns.
- Acharya Tulsi, 82, Indian Jain religious leader.

=== 24 ===
- Marion Jones Callister, 76, American district judge (United States District Court for the District of Idaho).
- Brian Keith, 75, American actor (Family Affair, The Parent Trap, The Russians Are Coming, the Russians Are Coming), suicide.
- Paul Lavalle, 88, American conductor, composer, arranger and peron clarinet and saxophone.
- Sanjukta Panigrahi, 52, Indian Odissi dancer, cancer.
- Leonard B. Strang, 72, British professor of paediatric sciences, cancer.

=== 25 ===
- Bobby Blackwood, 62, Scottish footballer.
- Jacques Cousteau, 87, French explorer, conservationist, and oceanographer, heart attack.
- William Grinnell, 87, American football player and coach, congestive heart failure.
- Mario Salvadori, 90, American structural engineer and professor at Columbia University.
- Sotim Ulugzoda, 85, Soviet and Tajik writer.
- Richard Weiss, 33, West German-born American canoeist and Olympian (1992, 1996).

=== 26 ===
- George Bassman, 83, American composer and arranger.
- Don Bradley, 72, English football player.
- Charlie Chester, 83, English comedian, radio and television presenter and writer.
- Robert Frucht, 90, German-Chilean mathematician.
- William Grinnell, 87, American college football player and coach.
- Don Hutson, 84, American football player (Green Bay Packers) and member of the Pro Football Hall of Fame.
- Israel Kamakawiwoʻole, 38, Native Hawaiian musician and activist, respiratory failure.
- Thomas Joseph Murphy, 64, American prelate in the Catholic Church, cerebral hemorrhage.
- Armando Roche, 70, Cuban baseball player (Washington Senators).
- William Turnbull, 62, American architect, cancer.

=== 27 ===
- Ray Benge, 95, American baseball player.
- Narinder Biba, 56, Indian Punjabi singer.
- Samuel L. Devine, 81, American politician, member of the United States House of Representatives (1959-1981), cancer.
- Joseph Zong Huaide, 80, Chinese Roman Catholic bishop.
- Walter Jordan, 93, Australian rower and Olympian (1936).
- W. O. G. Lofts, 73, British researcher and author.
- Marion M. Magruder, 86, American Marines officer.
- Harrison Marks, 70, English glamour photographer and director of pornographic films.
- Kenneth Neate, 82, Australian tenor, opera producer, composer and author.
- Ken Richardson, 85, English racing and test driver.
- Ondino Viera, 95, Uruguayan football manager.

=== 28 ===
- Gary DeVore, 55, American Hollywood screenwriter, murdered.
- Forest Dewey Dodrill, 95, American doctor and inventor of the Dodrill-GMR heart machine.
- Jack Hinton, 87, New Zealand soldier during World War II and recipient of the Victoria Cross.
- Hubert Lamb, 83, English climatologist.
- Hildegard Ochse, 61, German photographer, leukemia.
- Friedrich von Mellenthin, 92, German Wehrmacht general during World War II.
- Roland Surrugue, 58, French Olympic cyclist (1960).
- Yang Yichen, 83, Chinese politician.

=== 29 ===
- Nicholas Cleaveland Bodman, 83, American linguist.
- William Hickey, 69, American actor (Prizzi's Honor, National Lampoon's Christmas Vacation, The Nightmare Before Christmas), emphysema and bronchitis.
- Marjorie Linklater, 88, Scottish arts and environment campaigner, cancer and heart failure.
- Tom Lovell, 88, American illustrator and painter, car accident.
- Petey Rosenberg, 79, American basketball player (Philadelphia Warriors).

=== 30 ===
- Gyula Benkő, 78, Hungarian actor and father of actor Péter Benkő.
- Su Bingqi, 87, Chinese archaeologist.
- Jindřich Blažek, 63, Czech Olympic rower (1960).
- William Bradley, 64, English bicycle racer and Olympian (1960).
- Leslie Melia, 67, Canadian Olympic canoeist (1956).
- Larry O'Dea, 53, Australian professional wrestler, liver cancer.
- Alcira Soust Scaffo, 73, Uruguayan teacher and poet, respiratory disease.
