= Wrestling at the 1932 Summer Olympics – Men's freestyle middleweight =

Men's freestyle middleweight at the Games of the X Olympiad
- Venue: Grand Olympic Auditorium
- Dates: 1–3 August 1932
- Competitors: 7 from 7 nations

Medalists
1st place, gold medalist(s)		Ivar Johansson	Sweden
2nd place, silver medalist(s)		Kyösti Luukko	Finland
3rd place, bronze medalist(s)		József Tunyogi	Hungary

The men's freestyle middleweight competition at the 1932 Summer Olympics in Los Angeles took place from 1 August to 3 August at the Grand Olympic Auditorium. Nations were limited to one competitor. This weight class was limited to wrestlers weighing up to 79kg.

This freestyle wrestling competition did not use the single-elimination bracket format previously used for Olympic freestyle wrestling but instead followed the format that was introduced at the 1928 Summer Olympics for Greco-Roman wrestling, using an elimination system based on the accumulation of points. Each round featured all wrestlers pairing off and wrestling one bout (with one wrestler having a bye if there were an odd number). The loser received 3 points. The winner received 1 point if the win was by decision and 0 points if the win was by fall. At the end of each round, any wrestler with at least 5 points was eliminated.

== Schedule ==
Date	Event
1 August 1932	Round 1
2 August 1932	Round 2 Round 3
3 August 1932	Final round

== Results ==
=== Round 1 ===
Hess (bye) and Kotani (win by fall) advanced with 0 points. Tunyogi and Luukko each received 1 point for winning by decision. Johansson, Poilvé, and Stockton each received 3 points as losers of their bouts.

Bouts

Winner	Nation	Victory Type	Loser	Nation
József Tunyogi	Hungary	Decision	Émile Poilvé	France
Kotani Sumiyuki	Japan	Fall	Donald Stockton	Canada
Kyösti Luukko	Finland	Decision	Ivar Johansson	Sweden
Bob Hess	United States	Bye	N/A	N/A

Points

Rank	Wrestler	Nation	Start	Earned	Total
1	Kotani Sumiyuki	Japan	0	0	0
1	Robert William Hess	United States	0	0	0
3	Kyösti Luukko	Finland	0	1	1
3	József Tunyogi	Hungary	0	1	1
5	Ivar Johansson	Sweden	0	3	3
5	Émile Poilvé	France	0	3	3
5	Donald Stockton	Canada	0	3	3

=== Round 2 ===
The two 0-point wrestlers from the first round both lost, falling to 3 points. They were joined there by two first-round losers, Poilvé and Johansson, who won by fall in the second round. The third first-round loser, Stockton, lost again and was eliminated. Luukko moved into the lowest-points position with a bye keeping him at 1; Tunyogi had the best score among wrestlers who competed in both rounds with 2 points after a second win by decision.

Bouts

Winner	Nation	Victory Type	Loser	Nation
József Tunyogi	Hungary	Decision	Robert William Hess	United States
Émile Poilvé	France	Fall	Donald Stockton	Canada
Ivar Johansson	Sweden	Fall	Kotani Sumiyuki	Japan
Kyösti Luukko	Finland	Bye	N/A	N/A

Points

Rank	Wrestler	Nation	Start	Earned	Total
1	Kyösti Luukko	Finland	1	0	1
2	József Tunyogi	Hungary	1	1	2
3	Robert William Hess	United States	0	3	3
3	Ivar Johansson	Sweden	3	0	3
3	Kotani Sumiyuki	Japan	0	3	3
3	Émile Poilvé	France	3	0	3
7	Donald Stockton	Canada	3	3	6

=== Round 3 ===
The lead continued to be elusive, as Luukko lost to move from 1 point to 4. The three winners in this round all ended the round with 3 points, Hess and Johansson staying there with wins by fall and Tunyogi moving from 2 points to 3 with his win by decision. Kotani and Poilvé were both eliminated.

Bouts

Winner	Nation	Victory Type	Loser	Nation
Robert William Hess	United States	Fall	Kyösti Luukko	Finland
József Tunyogi	Hungary	Decision	Kotani Sumiyuki	Japan
Ivar Johansson	Sweden	Fall	Émile Poilvé	France

Points

Rank	Wrestler	Nation	Start	Earned	Total
1	József Tunyogi	Hungary	2	1	3
1	Robert William Hess	United States	3	0	3
1	Ivar Johansson	Sweden	3	0	3
4	Kyösti Luukko	Finland	1	3	4
5	Kotani Sumiyuki	Japan	3	3	6
5	Émile Poilvé	France	3	3	6

=== Final round ===
With all four wrestlers at no less than 3 points, both bouts in this round would eliminate the loser. Tunyogi and Hess were the defeated wrestlers, each finishing with 6 points. Because Tunyogi had defeated Hess earlier, he was awarded the bronze medal. The winners of the round each won by fall, with Johansson staying at 3 points to Luukko's 4. As the two had already faced each other, the competition was over and Johansson took the gold medal. Johansson had lost to Luukko earlier, but won his remaining matches by fall while Luukko also had a loss (to Hess) and had received an additional point by beating Johansson by decision rather than fall.

Bouts

Winner	Nation	Victory Type	Loser	Nation
Kyösti Luukko	Finland	Fall	József Tunyogi	Hungary
Ivar Johansson	Sweden	Fall	Robert William Hess	United States

Points

Rank	Wrestler	Nation	Start	Earned	Total
1st place, gold medalist(s)	Ivar Johansson	Sweden	3	0	3
2nd place, silver medalist(s)	Kyösti Luukko	Finland	4	0	4
3rd place, bronze medalist(s)	József Tunyogi	Hungary	3	3	6
4	Robert William Hess	United States	3	3	6
