= 1937 European Wrestling Championships =

- Host city: Munchen, Nazi Germany Freestyle; Paris, France Greco-Roman
- Dates: 29-31 October 1937; 20 - 22 May 1937

Champions
- Freestyle: Germany
- Greco-Roman: Sweden

The 1937 European Wrestling Championships were held in the men's Freestyle style in Munchen 29-31 October 1937; the Greco-Roman style and in Paris 20 - 22 May 1937.

== Medal table ==
Rank	Nation	Gold	Silver	Bronze	Total
1	Germany	5	3	2	10
2	Sweden	4	5	1	10
3	Finland	2	1	2	5
4	Estonia	1	2	1	4
5	Hungary	1	1	2	4
6	Italy	1	0	0	1
7	Switzerland	0	2	2	4
8	Czechoslovakia	0	0	3	3
9	Netherlands	0	0	1	1
Totals (9 entries)		14	14	14	42

== Medal summary ==
=== Men's freestyle ===
Event	Gold	Silver	Bronze
56 kg	Jakob Brendel; Germany	Herman Tuvesson; Sweden	Wiliam Mannula; Finland
61 kg	Ferenc Tóth; Hungary	Kustaa Pihlajamäki; Finland	Josef Polák; Czechoslovakia
66 kg	Heinrich Nettesheim; Germany	Gösta Frändfors; Sweden	Fritz Vordermann; Switzerland
72 kg	Fritz Schäfer; Germany	Willy Angst; Switzerland	Antti Mäki; Finland
79 kg	Ivar Johansson; Sweden	János Riheczky; Hungary	Paul Dätwyler; Switzerland
87 kg	Axel Cadier; Sweden	Paul Böhmer; Germany	József Palotás; Hungary
87+ kg	Kurt Hornfischer; Germany	Willy Lardon; Switzerland	Gyula Bóbis; Hungary

=== Men's Greco-Roman ===
Event	Gold	Silver	Bronze
56 kg	Dante Bertoli; Italy	Egon Svensson; Sweden	Antonín Nič; Czechoslovakia
61 kg	Kustaa Pihlajamäki; Finland	Heinrich Schwarzkopf; Germany	Einar Karlsson; Sweden
66 kg	Lauri Koskela; Finland	Herbert Olofsson; Sweden	Fritz Weikart; Germany
72 kg	Fritz Schäfer; Germany	Karel Zvonař; Estonia	Walter Massop; Netherlands
79 kg	Ivar Johansson; Sweden	Ludwig Schweickert; Germany	Voldemar Mägi; Estonia
87 kg	Nils Åkerlindh; Sweden	August Neo; Estonia	Werner Seelenbinder; Germany
87+ kg	Kristjan Palusalu; Estonia	John Nyman; Sweden	Josef Klapuch; Czechoslovakia
