= Voliva =

Voliva is a surname. Notable people with the surname include:

- Richard Voliva (1912–1999), American sport wrestler and coach
- Wilbur Glenn Voliva (1870–1942), American cult leader and Flat Earth theorist

== See also ==
- Voliba
