= Wrestling at the 1936 Summer Olympics – Men's freestyle middleweight =

Men's freestyle middleweight at the Games of the XI Olympiad
- Venue: Deutschlandhalle
- Dates: 2–4 August 1936
- Competitors: 15 from 15 nations

Medalists
1st place, gold medalist(s)		Émile Poilvé	France
2nd place, silver medalist(s)		Richard Voliva	United States
3rd place, bronze medalist(s)		Ahmet Kireççi	Turkey

The men's freestyle middleweight competition at the 1936 Summer Olympics in Berlin took place from 2 August to 4 August at the Deutschlandhalle. Nations were limited to one competitor. This weight class was limited to wrestlers weighing up to 79kg.

This freestyle wrestling competition continued to use the "bad points" elimination system introduced at the 1928 Summer Olympics for Greco-Roman and at the 1932 Summer Olympics for freestyle wrestling, with a slight modification. Each round featured all wrestlers pairing off and wrestling one bout (with one wrestler having a bye if there were an odd number). The loser received 3 points if the loss was by fall or unanimous decision and 2 points if the decision was 2-1 (this was the modification from prior years, where all losses were 3 points). The winner received 1 point if the win was by decision and 0 points if the win was by fall. At the end of each round, any wrestler with at least 5 points was eliminated.

== Schedule ==
Date	Event
2 August 1936	Round 1
4 August 1936	Round 2 Round 3 Round 4 Round 5 Round 6

== Results ==
=== Round 1 ===
Of the winners, three won by fall and advanced with 0 points (a fourth man had a bye and also finished the round with 0 points) while four won by decision and moved to the second round with 1 point. The losers featured two by split decision (2 points), two by unanimous decision (3 points), and three by fall (3 points).

Bouts

Winner	Nation	Victory Type	Loser	Nation
János Riheczky	Hungary	Decision, 3–0	Karam Rasul	India
Richard Voliva	United States	Fall	Jan van der Merwe	South Africa
Ercole Gallegati	Italy	Decision, 2–1	Ludvig Lindblom	Sweden
Ahmet Kireççi	Turkey	Decision, 3–0	Hans Schedler	Germany
Kyösti Luukko	Finland	Fall	Frans Van Hoorebeke	Belgium
Émile Poilvé	France	Fall	Terry Evans	Canada
Jaroslav Sysel	Czechoslovakia	Decision, 2–1	Leslie Jeffers	Great Britain
Ernst Krebs	Switzerland	Bye	N/A	N/A

Points

Rank	Wrestler	Nation	Start	Earned	Total
1	Ernst Krebs	Switzerland	0	0	0
1	Kyösti Luukko	Finland	0	0	0
1	Émile Poilvé	France	0	0	0
1	Richard Voliva	United States	0	0	0
5	Ercole Gallegati	Italy	0	1	1
5	Ahmet Kireççi	Turkey	0	1	1
5	János Riheczky	Hungary	0	1	1
5	Jaroslav Sysel	Czechoslovakia	0	1	1
9	Leslie Jeffers	Great Britain	0	2	2
9	Ludvig Lindblom	Sweden	0	2	2
11	Terry Evans	Canada	0	3	3
11	Frans Van Hoorebeke	Belgium	0	3	3
11	Jan van der Merwe	South Africa	0	3	3
11	Karam Rasul	India	0	3	3
11	Hans Schedler	Germany	0	3	3

=== Round 2 ===
One of the quirks of the 1936 points system is that two losses did not necessarily eliminate a wrestler even though wrestlers could be eliminated with one or even no losses). This came into practice in the case of Lindblom here, who lost both the first two rounds by split decision, accumulating 2 points per loss for a total of 4—less than the 5 required for elimination. The other five men who finished the round at 0–2 had at least one loss by fall or unanimous decision, however, and were eliminated. Krebs was the only man to finish the round with 0 points, after a bye and a win by fall. The five men who were 2–0 had either 1 or 2 points. Three men were 1–1 and had either 3 or 4 points.

Bouts

Winner	Nation	Victory Type	Loser	Nation
Ernst Krebs	Switzerland	Fall	János Riheczky	Hungary
Richard Voliva	United States	Decision, 3–0	Karam Rasul	India
Ahmet Kireççi	Turkey	Decision, 2–1	Ludvig Lindblom	Sweden
Ercole Gallegati	Italy	Decision, 3–0	Hans Schedler	Germany
Émile Poilvé	France	Decision, 3–0	Kyösti Luukko	Finland
Jaroslav Sysel	Czechoslovakia	Fall	Frans Van Hoorebeke	Belgium
Leslie Jeffers	Great Britain	Decision, 2–1	Terry Evans	Canada
N/A	N/A	Withdrew	Jan van der Merwe	South Africa

Points

Rank	Wrestler	Nation	Start	Earned	Total
1	Ernst Krebs	Switzerland	0	0	0
2	Émile Poilvé	France	0	1	1
2	Jaroslav Sysel	Czechoslovakia	1	0	1
2	Richard Voliva	United States	0	1	1
5	Ercole Gallegati	Italy	1	1	2
5	Ahmet Kireççi	Turkey	1	1	2
7	Leslie Jeffers	Great Britain	2	1	3
7	Kyösti Luukko	Finland	0	3	3
9	Ludvig Lindblom	Sweden	2	2	4
9	János Riheczky	Hungary	1	3	4
11	Terry Evans	Canada	3	2	5
12	Frans Van Hoorebeke	Belgium	3	3	6
12	Jan van der Merwe	South Africa	3	3	6
12	Karam Rasul	India	3	3	6
12	Hans Schedler	Germany	3	3	6

=== Round 3 ===
Poilvé led after the round, at 3–0 and 1 point. Voliva was also 3–0, but had 2 points—the same as Krebs, who was 1–1. Kireççi was also 3–0 but had 3 points as all three wins came by decision and thus trailed Krebs. Luukko and Sysel were each 2–1. with 4 points. Gallegati (also at 2–1) was eliminated with 5 points. Further highlighting the odd results of the scoring system, the bout between Riheczky and Lindblom resulted in both being eliminated: Riheczky despite winning to improve to 2–1, while it took a third loss to finish Lindblom. Indeed, of the four men eliminated in this round, only Jeffers finished with 2 losses.

Bouts

Winner	Nation	Victory Type	Loser	Nation
Richard Voliva	United States	Decision, 2–1	Ernst Krebs	Switzerland
János Riheczky	Hungary	Decision, 3–0	Ludvig Lindblom	Sweden
Ahmet Kireççi	Turkey	Decision, 3–0	Ercole Gallegati	Italy
Kyösti Luukko	Finland	Decision, 3–0	Jaroslav Sysel	Czechoslovakia
Émile Poilvé	France	Fall	Leslie Jeffers	Great Britain

Points

Rank	Wrestler	Nation	Start	Earned	Total
1	Émile Poilvé	France	1	0	1
2	Ernst Krebs	Switzerland	0	2	2
2	Richard Voliva	United States	1	1	2
4	Ahmet Kireççi	Turkey	2	1	3
5	Kyösti Luukko	Finland	3	1	4
5	Jaroslav Sysel	Czechoslovakia	1	3	4
7	Ercole Gallegati	Italy	2	3	5
7	János Riheczky	Hungary	4	1	5
9	Leslie Jeffers	Great Britain	3	3	6
10	Ludvig Lindblom	Sweden	4	3	7

=== Round 4 ===
Krebs became the second wrestler in this event to withstand a second loss without being eliminated, moving to a 1–2 record but only 4 points because the win came by fall and both losses were by split decision. His opponent, Kireççi, also finished the round at 4 points with the win by decision adding 1 to his starting 3. Luukko was injured and could not finish the bout, leaving Voliva at 2 points. Poilvé won by fall to stay at 1 point, eliminating Sysel. The official rankings place Sysel 5th and Luukko 6th.

Bouts

Winner	Nation	Victory Type	Loser	Nation
Ahmet Kireççi	Turkey	Decision, 2–1	Ernst Krebs	Switzerland
Richard Voliva	United States	Withdrew	Kyösti Luukko	Finland
Émile Poilvé	France	Fall	Jaroslav Sysel	Czechoslovakia

Points

Rank	Wrestler	Nation	Start	Earned	Total
1	Émile Poilvé	France	1	0	1
2	Richard Voliva	United States	2	0	2
3	Ahmet Kireççi	Turkey	3	1	4
3	Ernst Krebs	Switzerland	2	2	4
5	Jaroslav Sysel	Czechoslovakia	4	3	7
6	Kyösti Luukko	Finland	4	3	7

=== Round 5 ===
Krebs managed to finish in fourth place despite winning only one bout, finally being eliminated by Poilvé. The latter man retained the lead at 1 point in his fifth win. Kireççi was also eliminated in this round, earning the bronze medal. Voliva, like Poilvé, had five wins but more had come by decision, putting Voliva at 3 points.

Bouts

Winner	Nation	Victory Type	Loser	Nation
Émile Poilvé	France	Fall	Ernst Krebs	Switzerland
Richard Voliva	United States	Decision, 2–1	Ahmet Kireççi	Turkey

Points

Rank	Wrestler	Nation	Start	Earned	Total
1	Émile Poilvé	France	1	0	1
2	Richard Voliva	United States	2	1	3
3rd place, bronze medalist(s)	Ahmet Kireççi	Turkey	4	2	6
4	Ernst Krebs	Switzerland	4	3	7

=== Round 6 ===
Points remained important into the final round, as Poilvé's 2-point advantage made the final not a direct competition for gold and silver. Instead, Voliva would need to win by fall or unanimous decision to take the gold. Poilvé would prevail even if he lost by split decision, as that result would give Voliva 4 points (adding 1 to his starting 3) but Poilvé only 3 (adding 2 to his starting 1). The Frenchman, however, won the match by fall, finishing a sterling performance of six wins with only one requiring a decision by the judges.

Bouts

Winner	Nation	Victory Type	Loser	Nation
Émile Poilvé	France	Fall	Richard Voliva	United States

Points

Rank	Wrestler	Nation	Start	Earned	Total
1st place, gold medalist(s)	Émile Poilvé	France	1	0	1
2nd place, silver medalist(s)	Richard Voliva	United States	3	3	6
