= Pigeot =

Pigeot is a surname. Notable people with the surname include:

- Édouard Pigeot (1912–1982), French wrestler
- Iris Pigeot (born 1960), German statistician
- Jacqueline Pigeot (born 1939), French Japanologist
- Nathalie Pigeot (born 1972), French politician
- Olivia Pigeot, Australian actress
