= Gogel =

Gogel is a surname. Notable people with this surname include:

- Alexander Gogel (1765–1821), Dutch politician
- Ernest Gogel (1911–1977), Swiss wrestler
- Fyodor Gogel (1775–1827), lieutenant-general of the Russian Empire
- Jane Karla Gögel (born 1975), Brazilian para archer and para table tennis player
- Matt Gogel (born 1971), American golfer and golf commentator
