= Schedler =

Schedler is a surname. Notable people with the surname include:

- Hans Schedler (1904–?), German wrestler
- Norbert Schedler (1933–2019), American professor
- Tom Schedler (born 1950), a Secretary of State of Louisiana
