= Josef Přibyl =

Josef Přibyl may refer to:

- Josef Přibyl (wrestler) (1904–?), Czech wrestler
- Josef Přibyl (chess player) (1947–2026), Czech chess player
