= Ernst Krebs =

Ernst Krebs may refer to:

- Ernst Krebs (canoeist)
- Ernst Krebs (wrestler)
- Ernst T. Krebs, American conman
