= Wrestling at the 1936 Summer Olympics – Men's Greco-Roman middleweight =

Men's Greco-Roman middleweight at the Games of the XI Olympiad
- Venue: Deutschlandhalle
- Dates: 6–9 August 1936
- Competitors: 16 from 16 nations

Medalists
1st place, gold medalist(s)		Ivar Johansson	Sweden
2nd place, silver medalist(s)		Ludwig Schweickert	Germany
3rd place, bronze medalist(s)		József Palotás	Hungary

The men's Greco-Roman middleweight competition at the 1936 Summer Olympics in Berlin took place from 6 August to 9 August at the Deutschlandhalle. Nations were limited to one competitor. This weight class was limited to wrestlers weighing up to 79kg.

This Greco-Roman wrestling competition continued to use the "bad points" elimination system introduced at the 1928 Summer Olympics, with a slight modification. Each round featured all wrestlers pairing off and wrestling one bout (with one wrestler having a bye if there were an odd number). The loser received 3 points if the loss was by fall or unanimous decision and 2 points if the decision was 2-1 (this was the modification from prior years, where all losses were 3 points). The winner received 1 point if the win was by decision and 0 points if the win was by fall. At the end of each round, any wrestler with at least 5 points was eliminated.

== Schedule ==
Date	Event
6 August 1936	Round 1
7 August 1936	Round 2
8 August 1936	Round 3 Round 4
9 August 1936	Round 5 Round 6

== Results ==
=== Round 1 ===
Of the eight bouts, five were won by fall giving the winners 0 points. The three other bouts were by decision, giving the winners 1 point apiece. Seven of the eight losers received 3 points, with Mägi the only losing by split decision and receiving only 2 point.

Bouts

Winner	Nation	Victory Type	Loser	Nation
Väinö Kokkinen	Finland	Decision, 2–1	Voldemar Mägi	Estonia
Ercole Gallegati	Italy	Decision, 3–0	Hans Frederiksen	Denmark
Francisc Cocoş	Romania	Fall	Ernest Gogel	Switzerland
Ludwig Schweickert	Germany	Fall	Hans Pointner	Austria
Ivar Johansson	Sweden	Fall	Georgios Lefakis	Greece
Ibrahim Orabi	Egypt	Decision, 3–0	Adnan Yurdaer	Turkey
József Palotás	Hungary	Fall	Édouard Pigeot	France
Kalman Kiš	Yugoslavia	Fall	Josef Přibyl	Czechoslovakia

Points

Rank	Wrestler	Nation	Start	Earned	Total
1	Francisc Cocos	Romania	0	0	0
1	Ivar Johansson	Sweden	0	0	0
1	Kalman Kis	Yugoslavia	0	0	0
1	József Palotás	Hungary	0	0	0
1	Ludwig Schweickert	Germany	0	0	0
6	Ercole Gallegati	Italy	0	1	1
6	Väinö Kokkinen	Finland	0	1	1
6	Ibrahim Orabi	Egypt	0	1	1
9	Voldemar Mägi	Estonia	0	2	2
10	Hans Frederiksen	Denmark	0	3	3
10	Ernest Gogel	Switzerland	0	3	3
10	Georgios Lefakis	Greece	0	3	3
10	Édouard Pigeot	France	0	3	3
10	Hans Pointner	Austria	0	3	3
10	Josef Přibyl	Czechoslovakia	0	3	3
10	Adnan Yurdaer	Turkey	0	3	3

=== Round 2 ===
Six men were eliminated in the eight bouts; the two losers who were not eliminated had started with 0 points and finished the round with 3. Johansson and Schweickert were the only two wrestlers to stay at 0 points, as Palotás's second win was by decision. Palotás was joined at 1 point by Kokkinen, who stayed at 1 point with a win by fall in this round. Two men had 2 points after each won two consecutive bouts by decision.

Bouts

Winner	Nation	Victory Type	Loser	Nation
Ercole Gallegati	Italy	Decision, 3–0	Voldemar Mägi	Estonia
Väinö Kokkinen	Finland	Fall	Hans Frederiksen	Denmark
Ludwig Schweickert	Germany	Fall	Francisc Cocos	Romania
Hans Pointner	Austria	Fall	Ernest Gogel	Switzerland
Ivar Johansson	Sweden	Fall	Adnan Yurdaer	Turkey
Ibrahim Orabi	Egypt	Decision, 3–0	Georgios Lefakis	Greece
Josef Přibyl	Czechoslovakia	Fall	Édouard Pigeot	France
József Palotás	Hungary	Decision, 3–0	Kalman Kis	Yugoslavia

Points

Rank	Wrestler	Nation	Start	Earned	Total
1	Ivar Johansson	Sweden	0	0	0
1	Ludwig Schweickert	Germany	0	0	0
3	Väinö Kokkinen	Finland	1	0	1
3	József Palotás	Hungary	0	1	1
5	Ercole Gallegati	Italy	1	1	2
5	Ibrahim Orabi	Egypt	1	1	2
7	Francisc Cocos	Romania	0	3	3
7	Kalman Kis	Yugoslavia	0	3	3
7	Hans Pointner	Austria	3	0	3
7	Josef Přibyl	Czechoslovakia	3	0	3
11	Voldemar Mägi	Estonia	2	3	5
12	Hans Frederiksen	Denmark	3	3	6
12	Ernest Gogel	Switzerland	3	3	6
12	Georgios Lefakis	Greece	3	3	6
12	Édouard Pigeot	France	3	3	6
12	Adnan Yurdaer	Turkey	3	3	6

=== Round 3 ===
None of the wrestlers had 0 points after this round; Johansson's win was by decision (moving him to 1 point) and Kokkinen lost by split decision (2 points). Palotás stayed at 1 point to join Johansson in the lead. Four wrestlers finished the round with 3 points. Three wrestlers received their second loss and were eliminated.

Bouts

Winner	Nation	Victory Type	Loser	Nation
Ercole Gallegati	Italy	Decision, 2–1	Väinö Kokkinen	Finland
Francisc Cocos	Romania	Fall	Hans Pointner	Austria
Ivar Johansson	Sweden	Decision, 2–1	Ludwig Schweickert	Germany
Ibrahim Orabi	Egypt	Decision, 3–0	Kalman Kis	Yugoslavia
József Palotás	Hungary	Fall	Josef Přibyl	Czechoslovakia

Points

Rank	Wrestler	Nation	Start	Earned	Total
1	Ivar Johansson	Sweden	0	1	1
1	József Palotás	Hungary	1	0	1
3	Ludwig Schweickert	Germany	0	2	2
4	Francisc Cocos	Romania	3	0	3
4	Ercole Gallegati	Italy	2	1	3
4	Väinö Kokkinen	Finland	1	2	3
4	Ibrahim Orabi	Egypt	2	1	3
8	Kalman Kis	Yugoslavia	3	3	6
8	Hans Pointner	Austria	3	3	6
8	Josef Přibyl	Czechoslovakia	3	3	6

=== Round 4 ===
Johansson and Palotás stayed at 1 point apiece with a win by fall and a bye, respectively. Kokkinen and Schweckert finished the round with 3 points each. The three losers in this round were eliminated; Cocos with his second loss, but Gallegati and Orabi each with only their first loss. Both men had won each of their first three bouts by decision and so had 3 points going into this round; one loss was enough for elimination. The official report assigns individual ranking through 6th place, leaving Orabi in 7th by default.

Bouts

Winner	Nation	Victory Type	Loser	Nation
Väinö Kokkinen	Finland	Fall	Francisc Cocos	Romania
Ludwig Schweickert	Germany	Decision, 3–0	Ercole Gallegati	Italy
Ivar Johansson	Sweden	Fall	Ibrahim Orabi	Egypt
József Palotás	Hungary	Bye	N/A	N/A

Points

Rank	Wrestler	Nation	Start	Earned	Total
1	Ivar Johansson	Sweden	1	0	1
1	József Palotás	Hungary	1	0	1
3	Väinö Kokkinen	Finland	3	0	3
3	Ludwig Schweickert	Germany	2	1	3
5	Francisc Cocos	Romania	3	3	6
6	Ercole Gallegati	Italy	3	3	6
7	Ibrahim Orabi	Egypt	3	3	6

=== Round 5 ===
Neither Palotás nor Johansson was threatened with elimination yet; Palotás lost to Schweickert to move from 1 point to 4 while Johansson prevailed by decision over Kokkinen to move to 2 points. Schweickert and Kokkinen each needed to win to continue, with Schweickert accomplishing that goal but Kokkinen falling.

Bouts

Winner	Nation	Victory Type	Loser	Nation
Ludwig Schweickert	Germany	Fall	József Palotás	Hungary
Ivar Johansson	Sweden	Decision, 3–0	Väinö Kokkinen	Finland

Points

Rank	Wrestler	Nation	Start	Earned	Total
1	Ivar Johansson	Sweden	1	1	2
2	Ludwig Schweickert	Germany	3	0	3
3	József Palotás	Hungary	1	3	4
4	Väinö Kokkinen	Finland	3	3	6

=== Round 6 ===
The only pairing among the three remaining wrestlers that had not been contested already was Johansson against Palotás (Johansson had defeated Schweickert, who had defeated Palotás). A Johansson win would give him the gold, Schweickert silver, and Palotás bronze. A Palotás win, however, would give Schweickert the gold, Palotás silver, and Johansson bronze—unless the win was by split decision, which would have reversed the silver and bronze, but still left Schweickert as the winner. Johansson defeated Palotás by fall, however, to win the gold medal.

Bouts

Winner	Nation	Victory Type	Loser	Nation
Ivar Johansson	Sweden	Fall	József Palotás	Hungary
Ludwig Schweickert	Germany	Bye	N/A	N/A

Points

Rank	Wrestler	Nation	Start	Earned	Total
1st place, gold medalist(s)	Ivar Johansson	Sweden	2	0	2
2nd place, silver medalist(s)	Ludwig Schweickert	Germany	3	0	3
3rd place, bronze medalist(s)	József Palotás	Hungary	4	3	7
