= Voliba leptomorpha =

Scientific classification
- Domain: Eukaryota
- Kingdom: Animalia
- Phylum: Arthropoda
- Class: Insecta
- Order: Lepidoptera
- Family: Crambidae
- Genus: Voliba
- Species: V. leptomorpha

Binomial name
- Voliba leptomorpha Turner, 1908

Synonyms
- Metasia dactyliota Turner, 1908

Species of moth

Voliba leptomorpha is a moth in the family Crambidae. It was described by Turner in 1908. It is found in Australia, where it has been recorded from Queensland.

The wingspan is about 11 mm. The forewings are ochreous-whitish with fuscous markings. There is a basal fascia, expanded on the costa and there is also a transverse straight linear fascia, as well as a discal dot beneath the costa and a larger discal dot beneath the costa. There is a postmedian line from the costa, bent inwards to touch the lower extremity of the posterior dot, and then to the dorsum. From the upper bend it gives off a process to the tornus. The hindwings are whitish, which a slight pale fuscous suffusion on mid-termen.
