= Karam Rasul =

Indian wrestler

Personal information
- Nationality: Indian
- Born: 17 May 1911

Sport
- Sport: Wrestling

Karam Rasul (born 17 May 1911, date of death unknown) was an Indian wrestler. He competed in the men's freestyle middleweight at the 1936 Summer Olympics.
