= Francisc Cocoș =

Romanian wrestler

Personal information
- Nationality: Romanian
- Born: 14 October 1910 Vinga, Austria-Hungary
- Died: December 1982 (aged 72) Bucharest, Romania

Sport
- Sport: Wrestling

Francisc Cocoș (14 October 1910 – December 1982) was a Romanian wrestler. He competed in the men's Greco-Roman middleweight at the 1936 Summer Olympics.
