= Kalman Kiš =

Yugoslav wrestler

Personal information
- Nationality: Yugoslav
- Born: 1 December 1914

Sport
- Sport: Wrestling

Kalman Kiš (born 1 December 1914, date of death unknown) was a Yugoslav wrestler. He competed in the men's Greco-Roman middleweight at the 1936 Summer Olympics.
