= Voliba gigantea =

Scientific classification
- Kingdom: Animalia
- Phylum: Arthropoda
- Class: Insecta
- Order: Lepidoptera
- Family: Crambidae
- Genus: Voliba
- Species: V. gigantea

Binomial name
- Voliba gigantea Hampson, 1912

Synonyms
- Cynaeda gigantea rungsi P. Leraut, 2012

Species of moth

Voliba gigantea is a moth in the family Crambidae. It was described by George Hampson in 1912. It is found in Papua New Guinea.

== Subspecies ==
- Voliba gigantea gigantea (Papua New Guinea)
- Voliba gigantea rungsi (P. Leraut, 2012) (Morocco)
