= Adnan Yurdaer =

Turkish wrestler

Personal information
- Nationality: Turkish
- Born: 7 August 1908
- Died: 16 April 1982 (aged 73)

Sport
- Sport: Wrestling

Adnan Yurdaer (7 August 1908 – 16 April 1982) was a Turkish wrestler. He competed in the men's Greco-Roman middleweight at the 1936 Summer Olympics.
