= József Tunyogi =

Hungarian wrestler (1907–1980)

Olympic medal record

Men's freestyle wrestling

Representing Hungary

Olympic Games
Bronze medal – third place	1932 Los Angeles	Middleweight

József Tunyogi (9 March 1907 - 11 April 1980) was born in Budapest, Hungary and was a Hungarian wrestler.

He won the European Greco-Roman wrestling championship in 1929 and the European freestyle wrestling in 1931.

== 1932 games ==
The following year he was selected by Hungary for the 1932 Summer Olympics in Los Angeles, United States at the age of 25. In the first round (1 August) he defeated Émile Poilvé of France, followed by Robert Hess of the USA the next day.

In the third round he defeated Sumiyuki Kutani of Japan, on the same day as he defeated Hess. All three of his victories were by decision.

In the final round, however, he was beaten by Kyösti Luukko of Finland, knocked out after 7 minutes, 29 seconds. Luukko then went on to win the silver medal.

He died in 1980 in Iváncsa, Hungary.

== See also ==
- Hungary at the 1932 Summer Olympics
