= Voliba psammoessa =

Scientific classification
- Domain: Eukaryota
- Kingdom: Animalia
- Phylum: Arthropoda
- Class: Insecta
- Order: Lepidoptera
- Family: Crambidae
- Genus: Voliba
- Species: V. psammoessa

Binomial name
- Voliba psammoessa Turner, 1908

Species of moth

Voliba psammoessa is a moth in the family Crambidae. It was described by Turner in 1908. It is found in Australia, where it has been recorded from Queensland.

The wingspan is 12–13 mm. The forewings are whitish, finely irrorated with ochreous-fuscous and with dark-fuscous markings. There is a dot on the base of the costa and a fine transverse fascia, as well as a pale-centred discal ring beyond the middle, connected by a fine dentate line with the dorsum. There is also a line from the costa, at first straight, then describing a small outward curve, and ending above the tornus. There is a fine terminal line not reaching tornus. The hindwings are whitish, with a pale-fuscous suffusion towards the apex, containing an obscure fuscous line. There is also a short dark-fuscous streak from the tornus.
