= Jaroslav Sysel =

Czech wrestler

Personal information
- Nationality: Czech
- Born: 24 October 1908 Benešov, Austria-Hungary
- Died: March 1989 (aged 80)

Sport
- Sport: Wrestling

Jaroslav Sysel (24 October 1908 – March 1989) was a Czech wrestler. He competed in the men's freestyle middleweight at the 1936 Summer Olympics.
