= Terry Evans (wrestler) =

Canadian wrestler (1911–1999)

Personal information
- Born: Terrence Jesse Evans; October 4, 1911 Ashton upon Mersey, England
- Died: May 4, 1999 (aged 87) North Bay, Ontario, Canada

Sport
- Country: Canada
- Sport: Wrestling
- Weight class: Middleweight
Medal record
Men's Freestyle wrestling
British Empire Games
Gold medal – first place	1934 London	Middleweight
Gold medal – first place	1938 Sydney	Middleweight

Terrence Jesse Evans (October 4, 1911 – May 4, 1999) was a Canadian freestyle sport wrestler who competed in the 1936 Summer Olympics.

He was born in Ashton upon Mersey, United Kingdom of Great Britain and Ireland.

In 1936 he competed in the freestyle middleweight tournament.

At the 1934 Empire Games he won the gold medal in the freestyle middleweight class. Four years later he won again the gold medal in the freestyle middleweight competition at the 1938 Empire Games. He later moved to North Bay, Ontario where he founded the North Bay Canoe Club in 1968, along with his wife Jean. He died there in 1999.
