= Voliba scoparialis =

Scientific classification
- Kingdom: Animalia
- Phylum: Arthropoda
- Class: Insecta
- Order: Lepidoptera
- Family: Crambidae
- Genus: Voliba
- Species: V. scoparialis

Binomial name
- Voliba scoparialis (Walker, 1866)

Synonyms
- Gabrisa scoparialis Walker, 1866

Species of moth

Voliba scoparialis is a moth in the family Crambidae. It was described by Francis Walker in 1866. It is found in Australia, where it has been recorded from New South Wales.

Adults are cinereous (ash grey), the wings with two undulating brown lines, of which the second is much bent in the forewings. There is a brownish tinge about the exterior border. The forewings have a reniform mark forming an oblong ringlet, which emits a short line to the costa.
