= Georgios Lefakis =

Greek wrestler

Personal information
- Nationality: Greek
- Born: 9 April 1912 Andros, Greece
- Died: August 1976 New Jersey, United States

Sport
- Sport: Wrestling

Georgios Lefakis (9 April 1912 – August 1976) was a Greek wrestler. He competed in the men's Greco-Roman middleweight at the 1936 Summer Olympics.
