= Bob Hess (wrestler) =

American wrestler (1910–1998)

Personal information
- Full name: Robert William Hess
- Born: November 10, 1910 Cresco, Iowa, U.S.
- Died: March 16, 1998 (aged 87) Oregon City, Oregon, U.S.

Sport
- Country: United States
- Sport: Wrestling
- Events: Freestyle and Folkstyle
- College team: Iowa Agricultural College
- Team: USA
Medal record
Collegiate Wrestling
Representing Iowa Agricultural College
NCAA Championships
| Gold medal – first place | 1932 Bloomington | 174 lb |
| Gold medal – first place | 1933 Bethlehem | 175 lb |
| Silver medal – second place | 1931 Providence | 165 lb |

Robert William "Bob" Hess (November 10, 1910 – March 16, 1998) was an American freestyle and folkstyle wrestler. He competed in the men's freestyle middleweight at the 1932 Summer Olympics. In college at Iowa State, Hess was a two-time NCAA champion and three-time All-American.
