= Frans Van Hoorebeke =

Belgian wrestler

Personal information
- Nationality: Belgian
- Born: 26 January 1908

Sport
- Sport: Wrestling

Frans Van Hoorebeke (26 January 1908 – 10 July 1984) was a Belgian wrestler. He competed in the men's freestyle middleweight at the 1936 Summer Olympics.
