= Voliba pycnosticta =

Scientific classification
- Domain: Eukaryota
- Kingdom: Animalia
- Phylum: Arthropoda
- Class: Insecta
- Order: Lepidoptera
- Family: Crambidae
- Genus: Voliba
- Species: V. pycnosticta

Binomial name
- Voliba pycnosticta Turner, 1908

Species of insect

Voliba pycnosticta is a moth in the family Crambidae. It was described by Turner in 1908. It is found in Australia, where it has been recorded from Queensland.

The wingspan is about 12 mm. The forewings are whitish, with fuscous, suffused markings. There is a basal patch and a transverse fascia and another in the middle, dilated on the costa. There is a spot on the costa, giving rise to a dentate line to the tornus and some fuscous suffusion on the termen. The hindwings are whitish, with some grey suffusion.
