= Voliba asphyctopa =

Scientific classification
- Domain: Eukaryota
- Kingdom: Animalia
- Phylum: Arthropoda
- Class: Insecta
- Order: Lepidoptera
- Family: Crambidae
- Genus: Voliba
- Species: V. asphyctopa

Binomial name
- Voliba asphyctopa Turner, 1908

Species of moth

Voliba asphyctopa is a moth in the family Crambidae. It was described by Turner in 1908. It is found in Australia, where it has been recorded from Queensland.

The wingspan is about 10 mm. The forewings are whitish with fuscous, distinct markings. There is an obscure basal patch and a narrow transverse fascia, succeeded by a subcostal dot. There is a larger discal dot and a fine dentate line from the costa, bent inwards to touch the discal dot, then curved in a right angle to the dorsum. There is a dot above the tornus close to the termen. The hindwings are whitish.
