= Jack Gravell =

Australian rules footballer, born 1914

Personal information
- Full name: Jack Gravell
- Born: 14 March 1914
- Died: 6 June 1997 (aged 83)
- Original team: Prahran
- Height: 178 cm (5 ft 10 in)
- Weight: 76 kg (168 lb)

Playing career^{1}
Years	Club	Games (Goals)
1943	St Kilda	1 (0)
- ^{1} Playing statistics correct to the end of 1943.

Jack Gravell (14 March 1914 – 6 June 1997) was an Australian rules footballer who played with St Kilda in the Victorian Football League (VFL).
