= Alberto Guerrero (sport shooter) =

Puerto Rican sports shooter

Personal information
- Full name: Alberto Guerrero Recio
- Born: 10 October 1903 Humacao, Puerto Rico
- Died: 20 November 1988 (aged 85) Guaynabo, Puerto Rico

Sport
- Sport: Sports shooting

Alberto Guerrero (10 October 1903 – 20 November 1988) was a Puerto Rican sports shooter. He competed at the 1952 Summer Olympics and 1968 Summer Olympics.
