= Richard Voliva =

American wrestler and coach (1912–1999)

Personal information
- Full name: Richard Lawrence Voliva
- Born: October 18, 1912 Bloomington, Indiana, U.S.
- Died: November 2, 1999 (aged 87) Amherst, Massachusetts, U.S.

Sport
- Country: United States
- Sport: Wrestling
- Events: Freestyle and Folkstyle
- College team: Indiana
- Team: USA
Medal record
Men's freestyle wrestling
Representing the United States
Olympic Games
Silver medal – second place	1936 Berlin	79 kg
Collegiate Wrestling
Representing the Indiana Hoosiers
NCAA Championships
Gold medal – first place	1934 Ann Arbor	175 lb
Silver medal – second place	1933 Bethlehem	175 lb

Richard Voliva (October 18, 1912 – November 2, 1999) was an American former wrestler and coach. He was silver medalist in freestyle wrestling at the 1936 Summer Olympics. In 1984, Voliva was inducted into the National Wrestling Hall of Fame as a Distinguished Member.
