= Arvid Syrrist =

Norwegian footballer (1905–1997)

Personal information
- Date of birth: 13 March 1905
- Date of death: 18 June 1997 (aged 92)

International career
Years	Team	Apps	(Gls)
1924–1932	Norway	5	(0)

Arvid Syrrist (13 March 1905 – 18 June 1997) was a Norwegian footballer. He played in five matches for the Norway national football team from 1924 to 1932.
