= Édouard Pigeot =

French wrestler

Personal information
- Nationality: French
- Born: 22 January 1912 Linas, Essonne, France
- Died: 27 September 1982 (aged 70) Cagnes-sur-Mer, France

Sport
- Sport: Wrestling

Édouard Fulbert Pigeot (22 January 1912 – 27 September 1982) was a French wrestler. He competed in the men's Greco-Roman middleweight at the 1936 Summer Olympics.
