= Voldemar Mägi =

Estonian wrestler

Personal information
- Nationality: Estonian
- Born: 4 November 1914 Lehtse, Estonia
- Died: 18 February 1954 (aged 39) Los Angeles, California, United States

Sport
- Sport: Wrestling

Voldemar Mägi (4 November 1914 – 18 February 1954) was an Estonian wrestler. He competed in the men's Greco-Roman middleweight at the 1936 Summer Olympics.
