= Nicholas Megura =

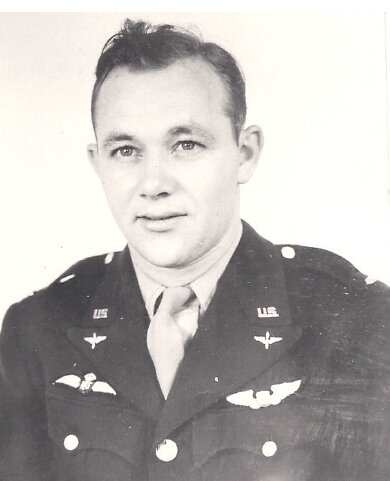
- Nickname: "Cowboy"
- Born: July 28, 1920 Ansonia, Connecticut, US
- Died: November 4, 1988 (aged 68) Bridgeport, Connecticut, US
- Allegiance: Canada; United States
- Branch: Royal Canadian Air Force; United States Army Air Forces; United States Air Force
- Rank: Lieutenant Colonel
- Conflicts: World War II
- Awards: Distinguished Service Cross; Distinguished Flying Cross (6); Air Medal (4); Purple Heart

Nicholas Megura (July 28, 1920 – November 4, 1988) was a lieutenant colonel in the United States Air Force. He served in the United States Army Air Forces as a fighter pilot during World War II, and he became an ace with 11.83 aerial victories before he himself was nearly shot down. Megura was able to crash-land his aircraft in neutral Sweden, but was not allowed to fly any more combat missions during the war due to the nature of his release from Sweden.

== Early life and service ==
Nicholas Megura was born on July 28, 1920, in Ansonia, Connecticut. While he was attending his first year at college, Megura was expelled due to his rebellious nature. He later got a job at a Vought-Sikorsky, where he took flying lessons. Before the United States entered World War II, Megura joined the Royal Canadian Air Force and became a flight instructor.

== World War II ==
In July 1943, Megura transferred to the United States Army Air Forces. He was assigned to the 334th Fighter Squadron, 4th Fighter Group, Eight Air Force, based in RAF Debden. When Megura was attached to the squadron, they flew P-47 Thunderbolts, however they switched over to P-51 Mustangs after a few months.

On March 6, 1944, First Lieutenant Megura shot down one German Messerschmitt Bf 110 and damaged a second one. Two days later, while on a B-17 bomber escort mission, five Messerschmitt Bf 109s attacked the group. Megura was able to quickly down one, and then engaged another Bf 109 which was attacking a B-17. Forcing the pilot of the Bf 109 to bail out, Megura claimed his fifth victory of the war along with ace status. Megura then damaged a third Bf 109 as it was landing at an airfield. While he was returning to Debden, Megura engaged a Junkers Ju 88 with his last operating gun, knocking out one engine before he completely ran out of ammunition. For his actions during this three day period, Megura was awarded the Distinguished Service Cross in April.

=== Internment in Sweden ===
On May 23, 1944, Captain Megura's group and several P-38s from another group engaged over 30 German fighters. While Megura was engaging three Bf 109s, his own aircraft was severely damaged by friendly fire from a P-38. The pilot of the P-38 had mistaken Megura's plane for an Bf 109.

Megura's coolant system was damaged, and he decided to bail out of his plane. However, he could not get his canopy open. Megura then nursed his plane toward Denmark, and he decided he would keep gliding toward neutral Sweden. Megura miraculously reached Sweden without crashing, and made a belly landing at the Kalmar Aerodrome.

Upon landing, Megura was interned by the Swedish military and was held until June 28. Megura chewed out his engineering officer for his faulty canopy when he returned to Debden. Due to diplomatic relations in securing his release from Sweden, Megura was no longer allowed to fly combat missions during the war and he was given an administrative job. Megura finished the war with a total of 11.83 aerial victories, plus an additional four on the ground.

== Later career and life ==
Megura stayed in the military after the war, transferring the newly established Air Force in 1947, later retiring as a lieutenant colonel. Nicholas Megura died on November 4, 1988, in Bridgeport, Connecticut.

== Awards and decorations ==
Army Air Forces Pilot Badge
Distinguished Service Cross
Distinguished Flying Cross with silver oak leaf cluster
Purple Heart
Air Medal with three bronze oak leaf clusters
Prisoner of War Medal
American Campaign Medal
European-African-Middle Eastern Campaign Medal with three bronze campaign stars
World War II Victory Medal
National Defense Service Medal
Air Force Longevity Service Award

=== Distinguished Service Cross citation ===

Megura, Nicholas
Captain (Air Corps), United States Army Air Forces
334th Fighter Squadron, 4th Fighter Group, 8th Air Force
Date of Action: March 6, 1944 and March 8, 1944

Citation:

The President of the United States of America, authorized by Act of Congress July 9, 1918, takes pleasure in presenting the Distinguished Service Cross to Captain (Air Corps), [then First Lieutenant Nicholas Megura, United States Army Air Forces, for extraordinary heroism in connection with military operations against an armed enemy while serving as Pilot of a P-51 Fighter Airplane in the 334th Fighter Squadron, 4th Fighter Group, EIGHTH Air Force, in aerial combat against enemy forces on 6 and 8 March 1944, in the European Theater of Operations. On 6 March 1944, he attacked enemy rocket fighter planes although outnumbered, destroying one and damaging another. On an escort mission on 8 March 1944, he was attacked by German fighters and destroyed one. three more enemy fighters attacked and he damaged one of them. Two more then attacked and he knocked another from the sky. With all his ammunition expended except for one gun, Captain Megura then engaged and severely damaged a Junker-88 with his few remaining rounds. Captain Megura's unquestionable valor in aerial combat is in keeping with the highest traditions of the military service and reflects great credit upon himself, the 8th Air Force, and the United States Army Air Forces.
