= János Riheczky =

Hungarian wrestler

Personal information
- Nationality: Hungarian
- Born: 23 August 1903 Budapest, Austria-Hungary
- Died: 19 February 1976 (aged 72) Cegléd, Hungary

Sport
- Sport: Wrestling

János Riheczky (23 August 1903 – 19 February 1976) was a Hungarian wrestler. He competed in the men's freestyle middleweight at the 1936 Summer Olympics.
