= Robert Francis Byrnes =

Russian historian

- Born: 30 December 1917; Waterville, New York, US
- Died: 19 June 1997 (aged 79); Ocean Isle, North Carolina, US

Academic background
- Education: Amherst College; Harvard University

Academic work
- Discipline: history
- Sub-discipline: Kremlinology
- Institutions: Rutgers University; Indiana University; Central Intelligence Agency

Robert Francis Byrnes (December 30, 1917, Waterville, New York – June 19, 1997, Ocean Isle, North Carolina) was an American professor of history, specializing in Russian history and Kremlinology.

== Life ==
Byrnes graduated from Amherst College in 1939. He became a graduate student at Harvard University in 1939, where he took a survey course in Russian history from Michael Karpovich and studied basic Russian under Samuel H. Cross. In 1943 Byrnes became a civilian employee of the military intelligence services, specializing in intelligence for the American bombing campaign against the Japanese electronics industry. In 1945 he was appointed to a one-year academic position at Swarthmore College, with an opportunity to teach Russian. He received a PhD in French history at Harvard University in 1947. In 1947 he joined the faculty of Rutgers University, where he taught European and Russian history. On a leave of absence from Rutgers, he spent two years from 1948 to 1950 as a senior postdoctoral fellow at Columbia University's new Russian Institute. In 1950 he returned to teaching at Rutgers University, but in 1951 he took another leave of absence to work as a researcher for the Office of National Estimates organized by William L. Langer under the auspices of the newly established Central Intelligence Agency (CIA). For the academic year 1950–1951 Byrnes was at the Institute for Advanced Study. From 1951 to 1954 he worked for the CIA. He was a Guggenheim Fellow for the academic year 1951–1952. From 1954 to 1956 he was the director of a CIA-funded think tank on Soviet issues.

In 1956 he joined the faculty of Indiana University Bloomington as a Russian specialist. He continued at Indiana for the remainder of his career, serving as chair of the history department from 1958 to 1965, director of the Russian and East European Institute from 1959 to 1962 and 1971 to 1975, and director of the International Affairs Center from 1965 to 1967. The Robert F. Byrnes Russian and East European Institute at Indiana University Bloomington is named in his honor.

He founded and directed for many years the Russian and East European Institute at Indiana University, which became one of the leading American centers. He served as the elected president of major scholarly societies, including the American Catholic Historical Association (in 1961) and the American Association for the Advancement of Slavic Studies, the main organization for Russian and East European studies in this country.

Byrnes specialized in the study of Russian conservative thought, Russian historical writing, anti-Semitism in France and Europe, the Soviet role in world affairs after World War II, American policy toward Eastern Europe, and Soviet American relations.

He was the author, editor, or co-editor of approximately 20 books. He was the author or coauthor of over 100 articles or book chapters. He was a member of the board of Radio Free Europe and Radio Liberty, a trustee of Boston College, a senior fellow at Georgetown University's Center for Strategic and International Studies, and a research fellow at Stanford University's Hoover Institute.

In 1942 Byrnes married Eleanor F. Jewell.

== Selected publications ==
- Antisemitism in modern France. New Brunswick, N.J.: Rutgers University Press.
- Pobedonostsev: His Life and Thought. Bloominghton: Indiana University Press. 1968; xiii+495 pp.
- Soviet-American Academic Exchanges, 1958-1975. Bloomington, IN: Indiana University Press. 1976.
- Awakening American Education to the World: The Role of Archibald Cary Coolidge, 1866-1928. University of Notre Dame Press. 1982.
- Byrnes, Robert F., ed. (1983). After Brezhnev: sources of Soviet conduct in the 1980s. Bloomington: Indiana University Press in association with the Center for Strategic and International Studies, Georgetown University, Washington.
- A History of Russian and East European Studies in United States. Selected Essays. Lanham, Maryland: University Press of America. 1994.
- V. O. Kliuchevskii, Historian of Russia. Indiana University Press. 1995.
