= Voliba =

Scientific classification
- Domain: Eukaryota
- Kingdom: Animalia
- Phylum: Arthropoda
- Class: Insecta
- Order: Lepidoptera
- Family: Crambidae
- Subfamily: Spilomelinae
- Genus: Voliba; Walker, 1866

Synonyms
- Gabrisa Walker, 1866; Stereocopa Meyrick, 1885

Genus of moths

Voliba is a genus of moths of the family Crambidae described by Walker in 1866.

== Species ==
- Voliba asphyctopa Turner, 1908
- Voliba gigantea Hampson, 1912
- Voliba leptomorpha Turner, 1908
- Voliba psammoessa Turner, 1908
- Voliba pycnosticta Turner, 1908
- Voliba scoparialis Walker, 1866
