= LeRoy Lemke =

American politician and lawyer

LeRoy Walter Lemke (September 24, 1935 – September 19, 1991) was an American politician and lawyer.

Lemke was born in Chicago, Illinois. He graduated from Drake University and John Marshall Law School. He was admitted to the Illinois bar and practice law in Chicago. Lemke served in the Illinois House of Representatives from 1973 to 1975 and was a Democrat. Lemke then served in the Illinois Senate from 1975 to 1987. Lemke died at the La Grange Memorial Hospital in La Grange, Illinois. He had lived in Willow Springs, Illinois at the time of his death.
