= Sumiyuki Kotani =

Japanese martial artist

Personal information
- Native name: 小谷 澄之
- Nationality: Japanese
- Born: August 3, 1903
- Died: October 9, 1991 (aged 88)
- Occupation: Judoka

Sport
- Sport: Judo
- Rank: 10th dan black belt
- Coached by: Jigoro Kano

Sumiyuki Kotani (小谷 澄之, Kotani Sumiyuki; August 3, 1903 – October 9, 1991) was a Japanese martial artist. He was a member of the 1932 Japanese Olympic wrestling team. He was one of the highest-ranked judoka, and was awarded a 10th dan in April 1984 by the Kodokan. He was for a long time the oldest 10th dan until Ichiro Abe was awarded the rank age of 83 years. Kotani studied at the Tokyo College of Education and studied judo directly under Jigoro Kano. As a young man, he was known to take on any challenges. Kotani was very active in promoting judo throughout the world and was the director of the international division at the Kodokan for many years. He was also a professor at Tokai University. He was the Kodokan's top representative and vice president of the All Japan Judo Federation. He died on October 19, 1991.
