= Ernest Gogel =

Swiss wrestler

Personal information
- Nationality: Swiss
- Born: 8 December 1911
- Died: 27 July 1977 (aged 65)

Sport
- Sport: Wrestling

Ernest Gogel (8 December 1911 – 27 July 1977) was a Swiss wrestler. He competed in the men's Greco-Roman middleweight at the 1936 Summer Olympics.
