= Ernie Nunn =

Australian rules footballer, born 1904

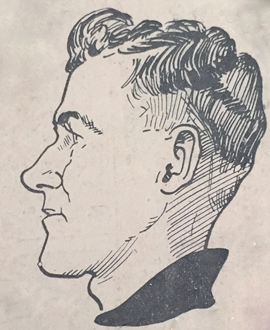

Personal information
- Full name: Ernest Henry Nunn
- Born: 23 September 1904; Mafeking, Victoria
- Died: 11 September 1991 (aged 86)
- Original team: Tiega / Ouyen
- Height: 179 cm (5 ft 10 in)
- Weight: 81 kg (179 lb)

Playing career^{1}
Years	Club	Games (Goals)
1929–31	Footscray	26 (19)
1932	Collingwood	5 (1)
Total		31 (20)
- ^{1} Playing statistics correct to the end of 1932.

Ernest Henry Nunn (23 September 1904 – 11 September 1991) was an Australian rules footballer who played with Footscray and Collingwood in the Victorian Football League (VFL).
