= Håkon Walde =

Norwegian footballer (1907-1988)

Personal information
- Date of birth: 25 April 1907
- Date of death: 28 November 1988 (aged 81)

International career
Years	Team	Apps	(Gls)
1929–1932	Norway	2	(0)

Håkon Walde (25 April 1907 – 28 November 1988) was a Norwegian footballer. He played in two matches for the Norway national football team from 1929 to 1932.
