= Josef Přibyl (wrestler) =

Czech wrestler

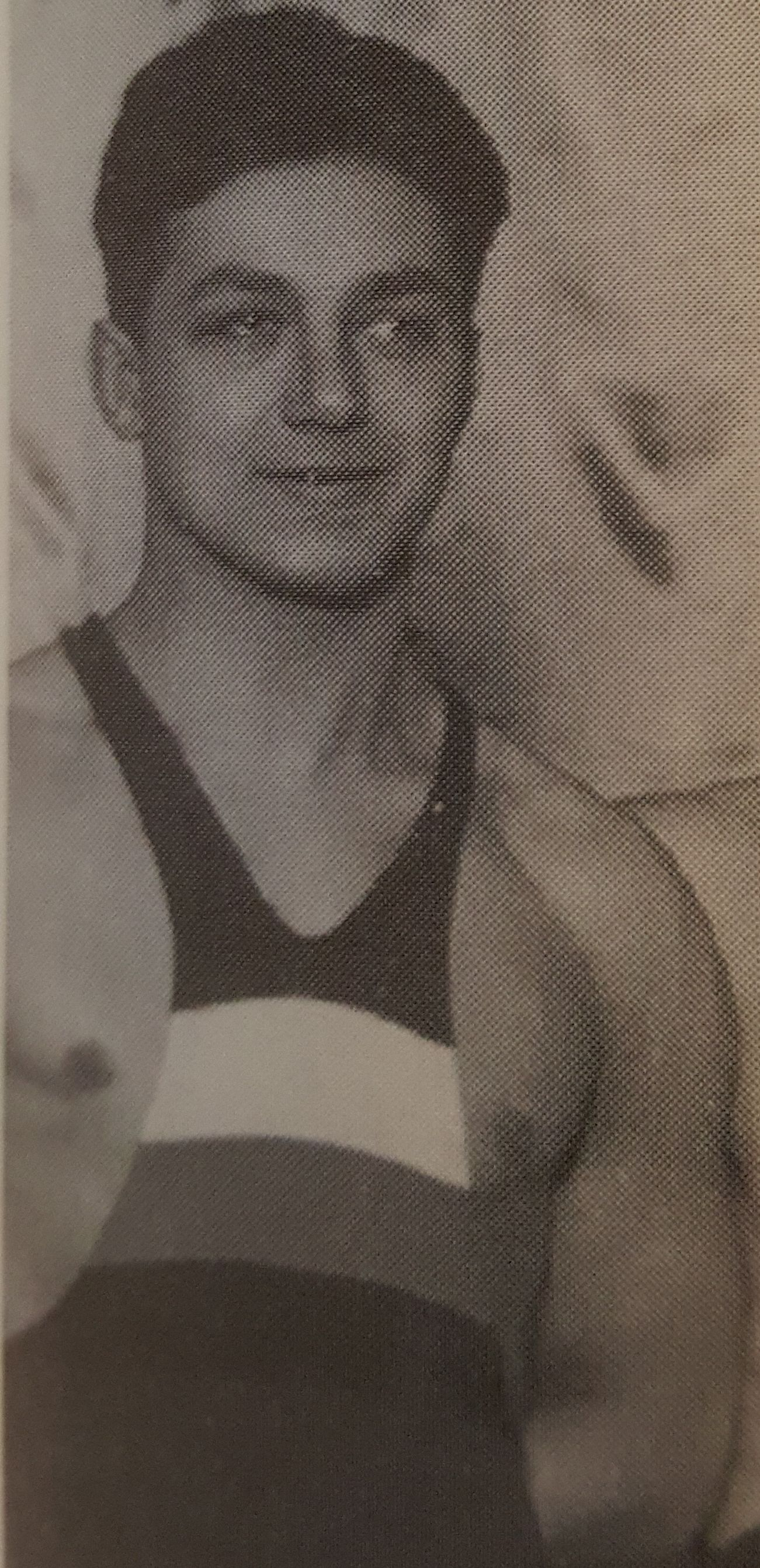
- Josef Přibyl

Personal information
- Nationality: Czech
- Born: 1 March 1904

Sport
- Sport: Wrestling

Josef Přibyl (born 1 March 1904, date of death unknown) was a Czech wrestler. He competed in the men's Greco-Roman middleweight at the 1936 Summer Olympics.
