= Hans Schedler =

German wrestler

Personal information
- Nationality: German
- Born: 12 June 1904

Sport
- Sport: Wrestling

Hans Schedler (born 12 June 1904, date of death unknown) was a German wrestler. He competed in the men's freestyle middleweight at the 1936 Summer Olympics.
