= Heinz Budde =

German politician

Member of the Bundestag
- In office 19 October 1965 – 19 October 1969

Personal details
- Born: 8 October 1925 Bochum
- Died: 14 September 1991 (aged 65) Köln, North Rhine-Westphalia, Germany
- Party: CDU

Heinz Budde (October 8, 1925 – September 14, 1991) was a German politician of the Christian Democratic Union (CDU) and former member of the German Bundestag.

== Life ==
Budde joined the CDU in January 1946, was co-founder of the Junge Union (JU) in the British occupation zone and chairman of the JU district association in Bochum. In 1963, he became a member of the main board of the Christian Democratic Workers' Union (CDA). Budde was a member of the German Bundestag from 1965 to 1969. He had entered the parliament via the state list of North Rhine-Westphalia.

== Literature ==
Herbst, Ludolf; Jahn, Bruno (2002). Vierhaus, Rudolf (ed.). Biographisches Handbuch der Mitglieder des Deutschen Bundestages. 1949–2002 [Biographical Handbook of the Members of the German Bundestag. 1949–2002] (in German). München: De Gruyter - De Gruyter Saur. p. 1715. ISBN 978-3-11-184511-1.
