= Bill Dalkin =

Australian rules footballer

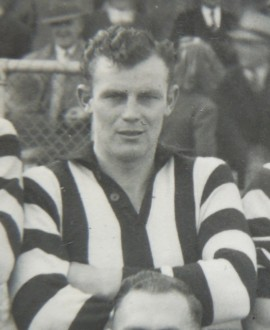
- Dalkin during his Collingwood career

Personal information
- Full name: Bill Dalkin
- Born: 15 November 1921
- Died: 27 November 1988 (aged 67)
- Original team: Wonthaggi
- Height: 183 cm (6 ft 0 in)
- Weight: 84 kg (185 lb)
- Position: Ruck / Defense

Playing career^{1}
Years	Club	Games (Goals)
1944–45	Collingwood	30 (10)
1946–49	Hawthorn	38 (10)
Total		68 (20)
- ^{1} Playing statistics correct to the end of 1949.

Bill Dalkin (15 November 1921 – 27 November 1988) was an Australian rules footballer who played with Collingwood and Hawthorn in the Victorian Football League (VFL).
