= Hans Pointner =

Austrian wrestler

Personal information
- Nationality: Austrian
- Born: 6 October 1908
- Died: 8 September 1991 (aged 82)

Sport
- Sport: Wrestling

Hans Pointner (6 October 1908 – 8 September 1991) was an Austrian wrestler. He competed in the men's Greco-Roman middleweight at the 1936 Summer Olympics.
