= Ludvig Lindblom =

Swedish wrestler

Personal information
- Nationality: Swedish
- Born: 12 January 1910; Örebro, Sweden
- Died: 4 October 1985 (aged 75); Tranås, Sweden

Sport
- Sport: Wrestling

Ludvig Lindblom (12 January 1910 – 4 October 1985) was a Swedish wrestler. He competed at the 1932 Summer Olympics and the 1936 Summer Olympics.
