= Tom Harrington (footballer) =

Australian rules footballer, born 1908

Personal information
- Full name: Thomas Harrington
- Born: 13 September 1908
- Died: 29 November 1988 (aged 80)
- Original team: North Fitzroy juniors

Playing career^{1}
| Years | Club | Games (Goals) |
| 1931 | Fitzroy | 1 (0) |
- ^{1} Playing statistics correct to the end of 1931.

Tom Harrington (13 September 1908 – 29 November 1988) was an Australian rules footballer who played with Fitzroy in the Victorian Football League (VFL).
