= Frank Neenan =

Australian rules footballer, born 1914

Personal information
- Full name: Francis Edward Neenan
- Born: 30 July 1914; Williamstown, Victoria
- Died: 8 September 1991 (aged 77); Newport, Victoria
- Original team: Williamstown CYMS (CYMSFA)
- Height: 188 cm (6 ft 2 in)
- Weight: 79 kg (174 lb)

Playing career^{1}
| Years | Club | Games (Goals) |
| 1936 | North Melbourne | 5 (2) |
- ^{1} Playing statistics correct to the end of 1936.

Francis Edward Neenan (30 July 1914 – 8 September 1991) was an Australian rules footballer who played with North Melbourne in the Victorian Football League (VFL).

Recruited from Williamstown CYMS in the CYMS Football Association, Neenan played 5 games for North Melbourne in 1936 before suffering an injury that kept him from playing in 1937.

Neenan later served in the Volunteer Defence Corps of the Australian Army during World War II.
