= Henri van Praag =

Jewish-Dutch writer, teacher, and historian

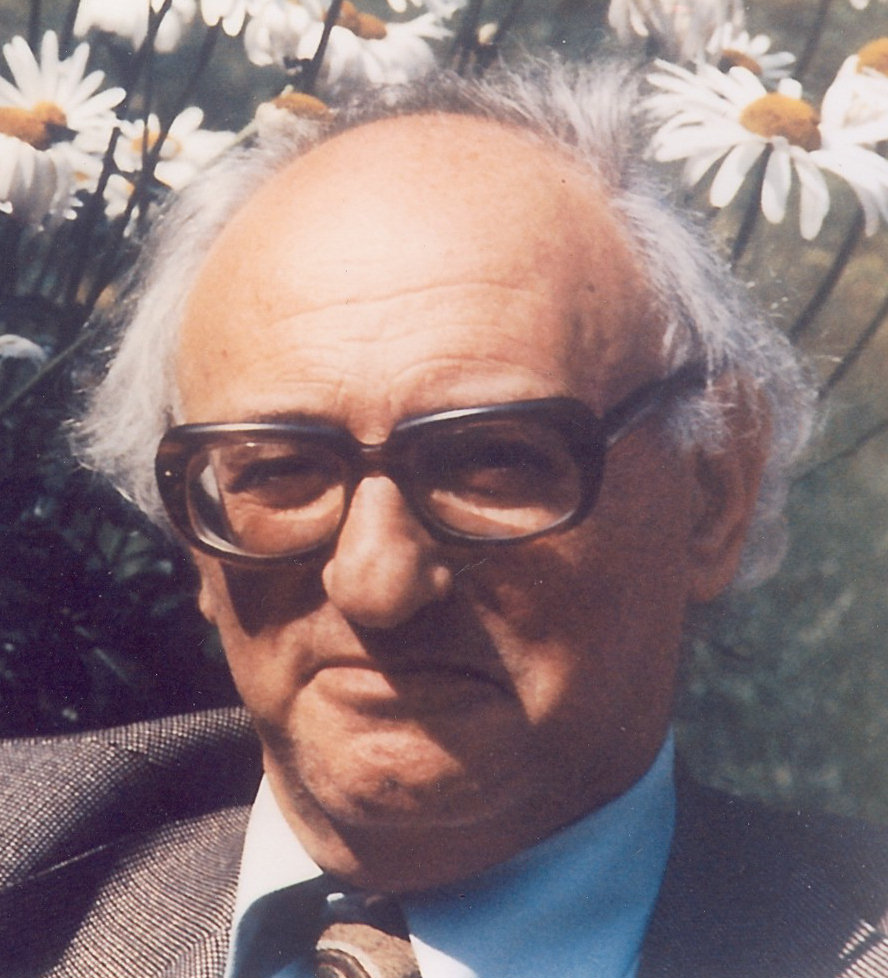
- Born: Naphthali ben Levi van Praag; 12 September 1916; Amsterdam, Netherlands
- Died: 3 November 1988 (aged 72); Hilversum
- Occupations: Educator, philosopher

Naphthali ben Levi (Henri) van Praag (September 12, 1916 in Amsterdam – November 3, 1988 in Hilversum) was a Jewish-Dutch writer, teacher, and religious historian, and became known also for his publications in the field of parapsychology.

== Childhood and education ==
Van Praag was the son of Esther Van Praag and diamond cutter Louis (Levi) van Praag. The family was Jewish but not religious. The family moved to Antwerp, where Van Praag attended elementary and high school.

In 1931 the family Van Praag was again registered in Amsterdam, and Henri attended the five-year course at the municipal training college (diploma 1936), where he met Leny van Huystee, whom he married in 1947. In 1938 he received his certificate of competency as headmaster, and in 1939 a teaching certificate in French. At this time his interest in mysticism led him to read Chinese sage Li, a Jewish mystic whose name he never mentioned, the theologian J. Eykman (1892-1945) and the philosopher-physicist-educator Dr Philip Kohnstamm (1875-1951). He also had a practice as a psychologist and psychotherapist.

Van Praag spent World War II in hiding, in Amsterdam and other places. Many of his relatives were deported to concentration camps, where more than seventy relatives were murdered. Leny maintained contact with him during this period.

== Post-war career ==
After the war, Van Praag wanted to work for peace, and "turned [...] to people across all boundaries of religion, or national cultures. He exchanged as any other information from Judaism to Buddhism, of Taoism to gnosticism, from theology to science.

After obtaining the deed Dutch Language and Literature for secondary education (1946), he began an eagerness for several university studies: general philosophy of science, physics and pedagogy (Kohnstamm), logic (Evert Willem Beth), mathematics (L.E.J. Brouwer), biology (Heimans), sociology (Mennicken), economics (Mermans), general linguistics (Marcel Cohen), history (Jacques Presser), Judaica (Joseph B. Soloveitchik), psychology (Otto Selz) and phenomenology of religion and cultural anthropology (Gerard van der Leeuw). Meanwhile, he was heavily involved with the Jews returning from the camps, especially in children. He conducted research for the Institute for the Tropics. His first, not in book form, study number, time and space, (1949) deals with the psychological foundations of mathematics and physics. His first book, The Meaning of Education (1950), was devoted to education and ends with a passionate creed. He did bachelor's degree in 1950, Master's degree in 1951. Under the pseudonym Bernard Raimond, he published a novel in the style of mystical Meyrink, is waiting for you (1953), a document that attests to his deep interest in and knowledge of China, the Jewish mysticism and reincarnation.

Shortly after the war in 1946 Van Praag was director of teaching HBS (Aid Study). Hammelburg related to the pedagogic Social Work community, working at the Dutch Institute for Psychological Research in Hilversum. In 1949 he took part in the tenth congress of philosophy in Paris. In 1951, Van Praag pedagogical consultant at the Institute of his teacher Kohnstamm, the General Social Consulting.

At an international conference in 1952 the World Organization for Mutual Understanding and Co-operation (WOMUC) set up and Henri became chairman. Van Praag included Otto Frank, Anne Frank's father, Zvi Werblowsky and Karl Thieme. One of the initiatives that emerged from the conference was the plan for a three-part series Das Lebendige Gottes Wort, an anthology with commentary from Jewish and Christian writings on revelation, prayer and promise. Many scholars, including Martin Buber, had agreed to cooperate, Thieme and Van Praag would lead. The plan was not implemented in this form by the sudden death of Thieme and the departure of Van Praag to Montevideo.

== Intermezzo Uruguay (1953–1954) ==
Intermezzo Uruguay (1953–1954) in early 1950, the Soviet Union under Joseph Stalin to anti-Semitism. Van Praag in 1953 went to Uruguay to investigate whether this country a new home for Jewish children could be. He was visiting Montevideo in psychology, pedagogy and philosophy, while he also had a practice as a psychologist-therapist. All his life he would also like therapist (counselor) for fellows remain available, people who were on something or had a question, could always go to him for an interview or an opinion. He then listened to the other, conducted an interview and ended with this advice.

He also studied Chinese language and culture in Montevideo with Professor Li Yu-Ying (Li Shizeng), former Rector of the Imperial University of Peking. With Stalin's death and the arrival of Nikita Khrushchev in 1953 compared the situation for Jews in Russia to improve, so the mission had formed the reason for the trip to South America was halted.

== In the center of society (1954–1973) ==
In the center of society was founded in 1954 with his brother Henry I. (Dorus) van Praag and I.J. Sloos, and was aimed at improving the dialogue between Jews and Christians. With Jacob Soetendorp he worked on the series Phoenix Bible Paperbacks. Soetendorp translated large parts of the Old Testament again from Hebrew into Dutch, inspired by the new German translation of Martin Buber and Franz Rosenzweig. Van Praag had to finalize the 18 parts of Hebrew Bible, J. Goudoever of the final editing of the 12 parts of the New Testament. Van Praag also wrote the entire series of some forty articles and introductory and linking between texts and other items were the result of numerous conversations between Protestant and Catholic Christians, Jews and - to a lesser extent - Muslims.

Van Praag was also active in many areas. He was appointed in 1957 as a teacher at the local training college in 4 hours per week in pedagogy and in the same year was appointed professor at the LOI (Pelman Institute). In 1958 he became director of the center for pedagogic Psychology in Amsterdam, in 1964 he was consultant and from 1966 senior lecturer of Teleac (a relationship that until 1977 would last), (main) editor for various publishers and magazines including Studium Generale, Effective Business Management and Intermediate. He was a valued partner of leading people in the scientific, religious, political and philosophical territory.

== Professor (1973–1988) ==
From 1973 to 1978 he was professor of sociology (religious schools) at the Wageningen Agricultural University. In 1974 we started with the establishment of the International Academy of Manternach (Luxembourg), with the first academic year of 1976. This academy was on March 15, 1979, as International University Lugano (Switzerland) continued and Van Praag was Chancellor and taught, among other methods, psychology and parapsychology. He was also rector of the Academy of Religion Vergleichende Geschichte in Duisburg (Germany), where he also taught religious studies.

In 1975 he founded the magazine Prana (magazine for spirituality and the periphery of science, publishing Ankh-Hermes) on. Prof. Van Praag had a good relationship with the publisher Paul Kluwer and was a consultant to the publisher.

In 1978 he succeeded Professor W.H.C. Tenhaeff as professor of parapsychology at the University of Utrecht, a position he held until 1986 would continue to play. Van Praag highlights in this field, that psychology should be seen as a border area of what is called parapsychology, as Einstein defined as a straight line curve with a degree of curvature = 0.

His wife Leny van Praag - Van Huystee died in 1981.

== Bibliography ==
- Number, time and space, Mathematisch Centrum, 1949
- The Meaning of Education, De Erven F. Bohn, 1950
- Abraham Philip Kohnstamm, a man of God, Ten Have, 1952
- Montessori for adults, World Window, 1952
- The Amsterdam Conversation on Israel, The Voice of Israel, 1952
- The message of Israel, World Window, 1952
- Conversation between East and West, World Window, 1952
- It is waiting for you, Van Stockum, 1953
- Pro Justitia, The Cycle, 1954
- Introduction to social sciences, Van Stockum, 1957
- Commemorative Book for Prof.. Dr. Ph. A. Kohnstamm, Wolters, 1957
- Psychology in theory and practice, De Haan Ph. 7, 1958
- The world of animal unlocked De Haan Ph. 28, 1959
- Mirror of Chinese civilization, Ph. De Haan. 26, 1960
- Pedagogy in theory and practice, De Haan Ph. 29, 1960
- In search of the unknown, Ph. De Haan. 33, 1960
- Mau-mau - Cats in art and literature, Ph. De Haan. 51, 1961
- À la découverte de l'algèbre, Marabout, Gerard, 1962
- Wisdom and beauty of India, Ph. De Haan. 1975, 1962
- Ethnographic encyclopedia, De Haan, 1962
- The art of parenting, Ph. De Haan. 29, 1963
- Compendium of psychology, Noordhoff, 1963 (re: Self-knowledge, mastic Press, 2005)
- Psychological encyclopedia, De Haan, 1964
- Textbook of psychology, Noordhoff, 1964
- The vocation of the youth in becoming a Europe, NJG, 1964
- The Jewish origins of Christianity, Moussault, 1964
- The phenomenon of Israel, Moussault, 1965
- Henrietta Szold, Noordhoff, 1965
- Logic, Teleac, 1966
- Sagesse de la Chine, Marabout, Gerard, 1966
- Israel and the Arabs - Open letter A.P., 1967
- The miracle of Persia, De Haan, 1967
- Psychology in theory and practice, De Haan, 1967 (= 5 ° pressure release from 1958)
- The art of parenting, De Haan, 1967
- Psychological encyclopedia, De Haan, 1967
- Humor, the secret weapon of democracy, AP, 1967
- Formal education in middle school, Wolters-Noordhoff, 1968
- Measuring and comparing Teleac / De Haan, 1968
- Agreement in the Middle East?, A.P., 1968
- The argument Solimon, V.T.B.V.D.B.D.B., 1968
- Living philosophy Teleac / Slaterus University Press, 1969
- Semitism, Zionism, De Haan, 1969
- Introduction to Psychology, Wolters-Noordhoff, 1970
- Dialogue of generations, De Haan, 1970
- Information and energy, De Haan, 1970
- Appeal to women, Ankh-Hermes, 1971
- The eight gates of salvation, Bantam, 1972
- Everything flows - Panta Rhei Teleac, 1972
- Key to the philosophy, Agon Elsevier, 1972
- Key to the philosophy (questions and assignments), Agon Elsevier, 1972
- Acupuncture, Ankh-Hermes, 1972
- Reincarnation, Remote Book, 1972
- Whether printed ... Van Gorcum, 1972
- Key words of the Bible - Our Father, Book Center, 1972
- Diary of Moses Flinker, (1942-1943) Bantam, 1973
- Inventaire de la parapsychology, France-Empire, 1973
- From chair to chair, Samsom, 1973
- Key to the I-Ching, Ankh-Hermes, 1974
- Anything goes, Tele Book, 1974
- Wisdom from East and West, Ankh-Hermes, 1974
- Para Psychological library (10 parts):
  - 1. Introduction to parapsychology Bantam, 1975
  - 2. Telepathy and telekinesis Bantam, 1975
  - 3. Psychic awareness Meulenhoff, 1975
  - 4. Paranormal physicality Bantam, 1975
  - 5. Paranormal identity Bantam, 1975
  - 6. Paranormal events Bantam, 1975
  - 7. Parapsychology and occultism Bantam, 1975
  - 8. Parapsychology and religion Bantam, 1975
  - 9. Parapsychology and evolution Bantam, 1975
  - 10. Parapsychology and transformation Bantam, 1975
- Everything else (4 parts):
  - 1. A new heaven and a new earth Bantam, 1976
  - 2. A world of one thousand artists Bantam, 1976
  - 3. Thinking like playing Bantam, 1977
  - 4. Magic in the service of mysticism Bantam, 1978
- Dialogue of generations, Tele Book, 1976
- Blueprint for a New World Book Center, 1976
- Karl Marx, a prophet of our time, Ankh-Hermes, 1976
- The four faces of Jerusalem, Bantam, 1976
- Signs of humanity, Ankh-Hermes, 1976
- The language of dreams - exploration and explanation, Bantam, 1977
- Mirror of our times, Tele Book, 1978
- Order and organization, Pandata, 1985
- It is waiting for you (Second edition), Ankh-Hermes, 1986
- Damit who blueht Erde - Das Phaenomen Israel, Scriba, 1986
- The eight paths of mysticism (2 º pressure of the eight gates of salvation from 1972), Bantam, 1986
- The language of dreams (reprint of 1977), Ankh-Hermes, 1986
- Change, Pandata, 1986
- Mystical wisdom and universal knowledge, Ankh-Hermes, 1986
- Tao Te Ching, Ankh-Hermes, 1986
- Artificial intelligence, Pandata, 1988
- Translations, introductions, contributions
- East and West seek God, The Cycle, 1955 (translation of C. Mayhew, Men Seeking God 1955)
- The Middle East, Ph. De Haan. 18, 1959
- In search of the unknown, Ph. De Haan. 33, 1960
- Africa Alive, Ph. De Haan. 41, 1960
- Encyclopedia of the Universe, De Haan, 1960
- Everything you need to know, De Haan, 1961
- À la découverte de l'algèbre, Marabout, Gerard, 1962
- Ethnographic encyclopedia, De Haan, 1962
- Le dossier Afrique, Marabout, Gerard, 1962
- Phoenix Bible Pockets, (parts 1-30) De Haan, 1962-1965
- Man and company tomorrow, Samsom, 1963
- Man in society, technology and culture, Ph. De Haan. 27, 1964
- How do we conquer the future?, Contact, 1964
- Chronicle of St. Jansoog, Moussault, 1964
- The Jewish origins of Christianity, Moussault, 1964
- Henrietta Szold, Noordhoff, 1965
- Encyclopedia for Young People (parts 1–10), De Haan, 1965-1967
- From Buddha to Sartre (the Netherlands edited and introduced by Van Praag), Moussault, 1965
- Social psychology, Wolters-Noordhoff, 1967
- The world of tomorrow (with Whitlau WAC), Worker Press, 1968
- Jewish press in the Netherlands and Germany, St. A. Frank, 1969
- Studies on the Jewish background of the OT, Van Gorcum, 1969
- Resonance of Anne Frank, Contact, 1970
- A tribute to Anne Frank, Doubleday, 1970
- Im Department für Schule, Kirche und State, Quelle & Meyer, 1970
- In-service training, VUGA, 1970
- Handbook for Managers (parts 1 and 2), Kluwer, 1970-1978
- Gay dialogicus, Samsom, 1971
- Views on ... Luitingh, 1972
- Future Research (parts 1–3), Kluwer, 1972-1975
- Whether printed ... Van Gorcum, 1972
- Printing and communications, N.D.B., 1974
- Perspektief '74, Intermediate, 1974
- Liber amicorum - Arend Hauer, NCA, 1974
- Bibeb - Interviews 1973 / 1977, Van Gennep, 1977
- Hypnosis in practice, Ankh-Hermes, 1977
- The bank in the world of tomorrow, NMB, 1978
- Animal testing in modern society, Ankh-Hermes, 1978
- My Judaism (Houwaart Dick (ed.) with contributions from Van Praag), Voorhoeve, 1980
- A tribute to Anne Frank, Shogakukan, 1981
- In 2000, Prisma, 1982
- Experiments on humans, Ankh-Hermes, 1982
- Shalom (Kruijf the TC and H. van der Sandt (eds.)), St. B. Folkertsma, 1983
- Closer to Anne, Leopold, 1985
- Man without Borders, BRT 1986
- About the Unseen - presented to Henry van Praag, Ankh-Hermes, 1986
- Psychic healing, Ankh-Hermes, 1988
