= Alan McInnes =

Australian cricketer

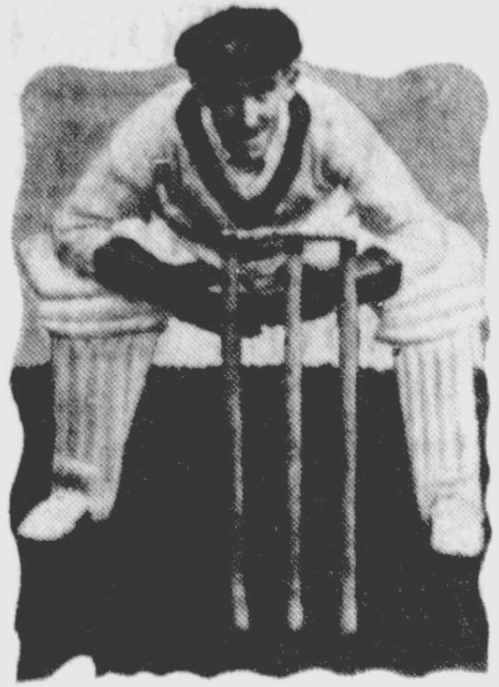

Personal information
- Born: 29 May 1907; Melbourne, Australia
- Died: 16 September 1991 (aged 84); Melbourne, Australia

Domestic team information
- Years: Team
- 1931: Victoria
- Source: Cricinfo, 22 November 2015

Alan McInnes (29 May 1907 – 16 September 1991) was an Australian cricketer. He played one first-class cricket match for Victoria in 1931. He also played for Essendon Cricket Club.

== See also ==
- List of Victoria first-class cricketers
