= Ludwig Schweickert =

German wrestler (1915–1943)

Medal record

Men's Greco-Roman wrestling

Representing Germany

Olympic Games
Silver medal – second place	1936 Berlin	Middleweight

Ludwig Schweickert (26 April 1915 in Fürth – 11 July 1943 near Oryol, Soviet Union) was a German wrestler who competed in the 1936 Summer Olympics. He also competed in the 1937 and 1939 editions of the European Wrestling Championships.

Despite serving in the Wehrmacht from 1936, he had trouble with Nazi officials due to his association with Communist wrestler Werner Seelenbinder. He was killed in action during World War II, defending Oryol from recapture by Soviet forces.
