= Hans Frederiksen =

Danish wrestler (1905–1988)

Personal information
- Nationality: Danish
- Born: 26 February 1905 Maribo, Denmark
- Died: 18 November 1988 (aged 83) Sundby, Denmark

Sport
- Sport: Wrestling

Hans Frederiksen (26 February 1905 – 18 November 1988) was a Danish wrestler. He competed in the men's Greco-Roman middleweight at the 1936 Summer Olympics.
