= Heinrich Schmidt (composer) =

Austrian composer

- Born: 25 September 1904; Wöllersdorf-Steinabrückl, Austria-Hungary
- Died: 29 November 1988 (aged 84); Vienna, Austria
- Occupation: Composer

Heinrich Schmidt (25 September 1904 – 29 November 1988) was an Austrian composer. His work was part of the music event in the art competition at the 1936 Summer Olympics.
