= Noel Burrows =

Australian rules footballer

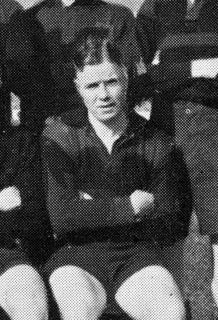
- Burrows in 1933

Personal information
- Full name: Woodley Noel Burrows
- Born: 27 March 1911; Malvern, Victoria
- Died: 11 June 1997 (aged 86); Kew, Victoria
- Original team: Xavier College
- Height: 173 cm (5 ft 8 in)
- Weight: 68 kg (150 lb)

Playing career^{1}
Years	Club	Games (Goals)
1933	Collingwood	1 (0)
- ^{1} Playing statistics correct to the end of 1933.

Woodley Noel Burrows (27 March 1911 – 11 June 1997) was an Australian rules footballer who played with Collingwood in the Victorian Football League (VFL).

Burrows enlisted to serve in World War II in July 1942 and served until the ended of the war.
