= Henri Van Poucke =

Belgian footballer

Personal information
- Date of birth: 9 May 1906
- Place of birth: Sint-Michiels, Belgium
- Date of death: 2 September 1991 (aged 85)

International career
Years	Team	Apps	(Gls)
1930	Belgium	2	(0)

Henri Van Poucke (9 May 1906 – 2 September 1991) was a Belgian footballer. He played in two matches for the Belgium national football team in 1930.
