= Émile Poilvé =

French wrestler (1903–1962)

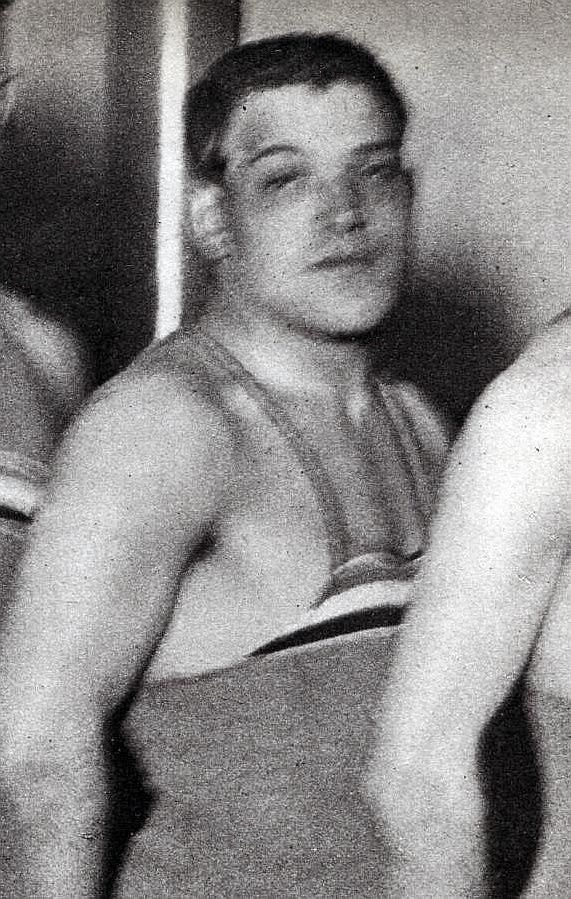
- Émile Poilvé, champion olympique de lutte 1936 en poids moyens

Personal information
- Born: September 22, 1903 Mégrit, France
- Died: October 11, 1962 (aged 59) Plénée-Jugon, France
Medal record
Men's freestyle wrestling
Representing France
Olympic Games
Gold medal – first place	1936 Berlin	Middleweight

Émile Poilvé (September 22, 1903 – October 11, 1962) was a French wrestler who won the gold medal at the 1936 Olympic Games in Berlin. France had to wait 72 years before Steeve Guenot at the 2008 Beijing Olympic Games won another gold medal in wrestling. Poilvé also competed at the 1928 Summer Olympics and the 1932 Summer Olympics.
