= Ivar Johansson (wrestler) =

Swedish wrestler (1903–1979)

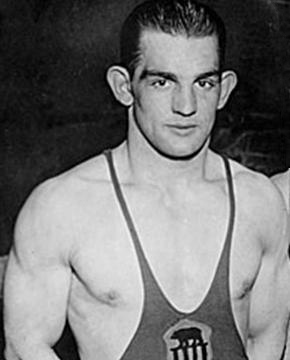
- Ivar Johansson in 1932

Personal information
- Born: 31 January 1903 Norrköping, Sweden
- Died: 4 August 1979 (aged 76) Norrköping, Sweden
- Weight: 79 kg (174 lb)

Sport
- Sport: Wrestling
- Events: Greco-Roman; Freestyle
- Club: IK Björnen, Norrköping
Medal record
Representing Sweden
Men's Greco-Roman wrestling
Olympic Games
Gold medal – first place	1932 Los Angeles	Welterweight
Gold medal – first place	1936 Berlin	Middleweight
European Championships
Bronze medal – third place	1929 Dortmund	Welterweight
Silver medal – second place	1930 Stockholm	Middleweight
Gold medal – first place	1931 Prague	Middleweight
Gold medal – first place	1934 Rome	Middleweight
Gold medal – first place	1935 Copenhagen	Middleweight
Gold medal – first place	1937 Paris	Middleweight
Gold medal – first place	1938 Tallinn	Middleweight
Gold medal – first place	1939 Oslo	Middleweight
Men's freestyle wrestling
Representing Sweden
Olympic Games
Gold medal – first place	1932 Los Angeles	Middleweight
European Championships
Gold medal – first place	1934 Stockholm	Middleweight
Gold medal – first place	1935 Brussels	Middleweight
Gold medal – first place	1937 Munich	Middleweight

Ivar Valentin Johansson (31 January 1903 – 4 August 1979) was a Swedish wrestler who competed at the 1928, 1932 and 1936 Summer Olympics. In 1932 he won the gold medal in the Greco-Roman welterweight and freestyle middleweight events. Four years later he won the gold medal in the Greco-Roman middleweight competition.

== Career ==
At the 1932 Olympics Johansson first competed as a freestyle middleweight. Despite being a favorite, he lost his first bout to Kyösti Luukko. Yet he won his all other bouts by fall, while Luukko lost in the semifinals and finished second. Two days later he was scheduled to compete as a Greco-Roman welterweight. For this purpose he shed five kilograms of bodyweight by fasting and sweating in a sauna, yet relatively easily won all four bouts. Later the same year he was awarded the Svenska Dagbladet Gold Medal.

Johansson never competed at the world championships. At the European championships he won nine titles in 1931–1939, six in Greco-Roman and three int freestyle wrestling.

Johansson grew up in a rural area near Norrköping, where he built his strength by manual labor at a farm. He then moved to Norrköping city to work as a police officer and then as a wrestling coach. The annual wrestling award "Ivars Guldsko" was established in Sweden in his honor after his death.
