= József Palotás =

Hungarian wrestler (1911–1957)

Medal record

Men's Greco-Roman wrestling

Representing Hungary

Olympic Games
Bronze medal – third place	1936 Berlin	Middleweight

József Palotás (14 May 1911 – 16 November 1957) was a Hungarian wrestler who competed in the 1936 Summer Olympics.
