= Ernst Krebs (wrestler) =

Swiss wrestler (1914–1997)

Personal information
- Nationality: Swiss
- Born: 29 November 1914

Sport
- Sport: Wrestling

Achievements and titles
- Olympic finals: 1936 Summer Olympics

Ernst Krebs (29 November 1914 – 10 June 1997) was a Swiss wrestler. He competed in the men's freestyle middleweight at the 1936 Summer Olympics.
