= Kyösti Luukko =

Finnish wrestler (1903–1970)

Medal record

Men's freestyle wrestling

Representing Finland

Olympic Games
Silver medal – second place	1932 Los Angeles	Middleweight

Kyösti Luukko (February 17, 1903 – October 27, 1970) was a Finnish wrestler and Olympic medalist. He won the silver medal in freestyle wrestling at the 1932 Summer Olympics in Los Angeles. He also competed at the 1936 Summer Olympics.
