= Deaths in April 1988 =

The following is a list of notable deaths in April 1988.

Entries for each day are listed alphabetically by surname. A typical entry lists information in the following sequence:

- Name, age, country of citizenship at birth, subsequent country of citizenship (if applicable), reason for notability, cause of death (if known), and reference.

== April 1988 ==
=== 1 ===
- Dietz Angerer, 84, Austrian Olympic sailor (1936).
- Đào Duy Anh, 83, Vietnamese historian.
- Jim Jordan, 91, American actor (Fibber McGee and Molly), stroke resulting from fall.
- Ginette Spanier, 84, French director of the House of Balmain.
- April Tinsley, 8, American murder victim.
- Nils Thune, 90, Norwegian politician.

=== 2 ===
- Jacques André, 69, French fighter pilot in World War II and Olympian (1948).
- John Baker, 70, Australian rules footballer.
- Jenő Barcsay, 88, Hungarian painter.
- Safi Darashah, 85-86, Indian cricketer.
- Talib Rasul Hakim, 48, American composer.
- Lisa Marie Kimmell, 18, American murder victim.
- Pushpaben Mehta, 83, Indian social worker and politician, member of the Rajya Sabha.
- Onar Onarheim, 77, Norwegian politician.
- Anthony Pelissier, 75, English actor, screenwriter and director (Personal Affair, The History of Mr. Polly).
- Eddie Regan, 78, Australian rules footballer.
- Vernon W. Thomson, 82, American politician, Governor of Wisconsin (1957-1959), and member of the United States House of Representatives (1961-1974).

=== 3 ===
- Milton Caniff, 81, American cartoonist (Terry and the Pirates, Steve Canyon), lung cancer.
- Lee Man Fong, 74, Chinese-born Indonesian painter.
- V. S. Wakankar, 68, Indian archaeologist.

=== 4 ===
- Jack Aragón, 72, Cuban baseball player and manager.
- Florestine Perrault Collins, 93, American professional photographer.
- Myra De Groot, 50, British-born American-Australian actress (The Sullivans, Neighbours), cancer.
- Kai Ewans, 81, Danish-American jazz reedist.
- Karol Fageros, 53, American tennis player, cancer.
- Eric A. Havelock, 84, British classicist.
- Perry Scott, 70, American NFL player (Detroit Lions).
- Charlie Snell, 94, American MLB player (St. Louis Browns).
- Archibald Southby, 77, English baronet, cricketer, and British Army officer.
- Roy Weatherby, 77, American founder and owner of Weatherby rifle company.

=== 5 ===
- Boyd Brumbaugh, 72, American NFL footballer (Brooklyn Dodgers), emphysema.
- Dutch Dorman, 85, American minor league baseball player and manager.
- Tom Earley, 71, American MLB player (Boston Bees/Braves).
- Mozaffar Firouz, 81, Iranian diplomat, ambassador to the USSR.
- Swede Halbrook, 55, American NBA basketballer (Syracuse Nationals), heart attack.
- Alf Kjellin, 68, Swedish-born American film actor and director, heart attack.
- August Kukk, 79, Estonian Olympic wrestler (1936).
- Elizabeth Linington, 67, American mystery novelist.
- Rosemary Manning, 76, British writer (The Chinese Garden).
- Robert S. Mendelsohn, 61, American pediatrician and critic of modern medical practice, cardiac arrest.
- Pierre Prévert, 71, French film director, screenwriter and actor.
- Alan Shorter, 55, American jazz trumpet and flugelhorn player, ruptured aorta.

=== 6 ===
- Gunārs Astra, 56, Latvian human rights activist and anti-Soviet dissident, heart disease.
- John Clements, 77, British actor and producer (Knight Without Armour, South Riding).
- Leroy Kirkland, 82–84, American bandleader, guitarist and songwriter.
- Hamdija Pozderac, 64, Yugoslav communist politician, President of People's Assembly of Bosnia and Herzegovina, stroke.
- Émile Roumer, 85, Haitian poet.

=== 7 ===
- Giovanni Gotti, 75, Italian racing cyclist.
- Denis Hamilton, 69, English newspaper editor (The Sunday Times, The Times).
- Dinanath Nadim, 72, Indian poet.
- Albert S. Rogell, 86, American film director.

=== 8 ===
- Vilayati Ram Katyal, 52, Indian politician, member of the Uttar Pradesh Legislative Assembly.
- Gustave Laporte, 79, Belgian Olympic wrestler (1936).
- Warren Lewis, 64, Australian rules footballer.
- Herman Roth, 92, American Negro Leagues Baseball player.
- Jim Waltermire, 39, American politician, Secretary of State of Montana (since 1981), plane crash.

=== 9 ===
- Brook Benton, 56, American singer and songwriter ("It's Just a Matter of Time", "Endlessly"), pneumonia.
- Hans Berndt, 74, German footballer.
- Syd Cohen, 81, American Major League baseball player (Washington Senators).
- John Herman Dent, 80, American politician, member of the U.S. House of Representatives (1958-1979).
- Jerry Harvey, 38, American screenwriter and film programmer (Z Channel), murder-suicide.
- Jack Lyons, 76, Australian rules footballer.
- Yvan Marie, 74, French racing cyclist.
- Jim Morris, 93, Australian rugby league footballer.
- Dave Prater, 50, American soul and rhythm & blues singer and musician, car accident.
- Arturo Rotor, 80, Filipino medical doctor, Executive Secretary of the Philippines, cancer.
- William Horace Temple, 89, Canadian politician and trade unionist.
- Sylvia Thalberg, 80, American screenwriter (Montana Moon).
- Delos Wickens, 78, American experimental research psychologist and author (Ohio State University).

=== 10 ===
- Khaqan Abbasi, Pakistani politician, Federal Minister for Production, car hit by missile.
- Turgut Atakol, 72, Turkish basketball player, referee and sports official.
- T. Glynne Davies, 62, Welsh poet, novelist and television and radio broadcaster.
- Cliff Gladwin, 72, English test cricketer (Derbyshire, England).
- Woody Kling, 62, American television writer, producer and composer, brain and lung cancer.
- Danuta Kordaczuk, 48, Polish Olympic volleyball player (1964).
- Ezekias Papaioannou, 79, Greek Cypriot politician.
- Shigeo Sugiura, 70, Japanese Olympic swimmer (1936).
- Roscoe Thompson, 65, American NASCAR driver.

=== 11 ===
- Ithell Colquhoun, 81, British painter, poet and author.
- James R. Domengeaux, 81, American politician, member of U.S. House of Representatives (1941-1949), leukemia.
- Jeff Donnell, 66, American actress (General Hospital, The Phantom Thief), heart attack.
- Wolfram Fiedler, 36, German Olympic luger (1972).
- Jesse L. Lasky Jr., 77, American screenwriter and novelist (Samson and Delilah, The Ten Commandments), pancreatic cancer.
- Francesco Pacini, 82, Italian Olympic modern pentathlete (1932).

=== 12 ===
- Tibor Benkő, 82, Hungarian Olympic athlete (1932).
- Colette Deréal, 60, French actress and singer.
- Sheridan Gibney, 84, American writer and producer in theatre and film (The Story of Louis Pasteur), cancer.
- Hartmann Lauterbacher, 78, Nazi German Deputy Reichsjugendführer, Stabsführer of Hitler Youth, unconvicted war criminal.
- Harry McShane, 96, Scottish socialist.
- Bill Montgomery, 73, Australian rules footballer.
- Krishnakant Patel, 60, Indian cricketer.
- Alan Paton, 85, South African writer and anti-Apartheid activist (Cry, the Beloved Country, Too Late the Phalarope), cancer.
- George Rock, 68, American trumpeter and singer (Spike Jones and his City Slickers).
- Frank Skaff, 77, American Major League baseball player (Brooklyn Dodgers, Philadelphia Athletics), heart attack.
- Jack Skinner, 70, Australian rules footballer.

=== 13 ===
- Roger Bailleux, 74, French racing cyclist.
- Clem Fisher, 80, Australian rules footballer.
- Jean Gascon, 67, Canadian opera director and actor, heart attack.
- Nat Singh Somnath, 72-73, Indian Olympic hammer thrower (1948).
- Leo Zeff, 75, American psychologist and psychotherapist.

=== 14 ===
- Arild Amundsen, 77, Norwegian Olympic sailor (1960).
- S. H. Barnett, 79, American screenwriter (Father Goose).
- Richard Fanshawe, 81, British Olympic equestrian (1936).
- Daniel Guérin, 83, French libertarian-communist author (Anarchism: From Theory to Practice).
- Jack McIntosh, 78, Scottish-born Canadian politician, member of the House of Commons of Canada (1958-1972).
- Pony Poindexter, 62, American jazz saxophonist.
- Camilla Ravera, 98, Italian politician, first female lifetime senator.
- John Stonehouse, 62, British businessman and minister, Member of Parliament, heart attack.
- Ralph Winegarner, 78, American MLB player (Cleveland Indians, St. Louis Browns).

=== 15 ===
- Rosemary Ames, 81, American film actress (Mr. Quincey of Monte Carlo, One More Spring).
- Fred Linkmeyer, 78, American fencer.
- George E. Mylonas, 89, Greek archaeologist, heart attack.
- Maria Ulfah Santoso, 76, Indonesian politician and women's rights activist, Minister of Social Affairs.
- Robert Skene, 79, English cricketer.
- Kenneth Williams, 62, British actor and comedian (Carry On), overdose of barbiturates.
- Robert H. York, 74, American US Army officer.

=== 16 ===
- J. Blaine Anderson, 66, American circuit judge.
- John Anderson, 79, British Army general, Deputy Chief of Imperial General Staff.
- José Dolhem, 43, French racing driver, power boat racing accident.
- Youri Egorov, 33, Soviet classical pianist, AIDS.
- George R. Howsam, 93, Canadian WWI flying ace.
- Jacques de Kadt, 90, Dutch politician, member of Dutch parliament.
- Francesco Pretti, 84, Italian Olympic racewalker (1932, 1948).
- John Reardon, 58, American baritone and actor (Mister Rogers' Neighborhood), pneumonia (AIDS).
- Clifford Roach, 84, Trinidadian test cricketer (Trinidad and Tobago, West Indies).
- Bobby Thompson, 76, English stand-up comedian and actor, emphysema and cancer.
- Khalil al-Wazir, 52, Palestinian leader, assassinated.

=== 17 ===
- Linda Batista, 68, Brazilian musician.
- Carlotta Corpron, 86, American photographer.
- Albert Fennell, 68, British film and television producer (The Avengers).
- Toni Frissell, 81, American photographer, Alzheimer's disease.
- Paul L. Freeman Jr., 80, American general in the U.S. Army, Commander in Chief of the U.S. Army Europe, heart ailment.
- Anthony Gaggi, 62, American mobster in the Gambino crime family, heart attack.
- Roger Burton Land, 47, British animal geneticist.
- Felicity Lane-Fox, 69, English member of the House of Lords, champion of disability issues.
- Patrick Mphephu, 63–64, South African politician, President of Venda.
- Louise Nevelson, 88, Ukrainian-born American sculptor.
- Eva Novak, 90, American film actress (The Romance of Runnibede, The Medicine Man), pneumonia.
- Otto Pächt, 85, Austrian art historian.
- Carlos Sotomayor, 76–77, Chilean painter, heart attack.
- George Williams, 70, American musician and composer ("Happy Days Are Here Again").
- Isaak Yaglom, 67, Soviet mathematician and author.

=== 18 ===
- Stanton Delaplane, 80, American travel writer (San Francisco Chronicle), Pulitzer Prize winner, emphysema.
- Pierre Desproges, 48, French humorist, lung cancer.
- Oktay Rıfat Horozcu, 73, Turkish writer and playwright.
- Lawrence E. Imhoff, 92, American politician, member of the United States House of Representatives (1933-1939, 1941-1943).
- Antonín Puč, 80, Czech international footballer (Slavia Prague, Czechoslovakia).
- Oktay Rifat, 73, Turkish writer and playwright.
- Phyllis Ross, 84–85, Canadian economist, chancellor of the University of British Columbia.
- Viktor Salmhofer, 78, Austrian Olympic sprint canoeist (1948).
- Ike Williams, 85, American NFL player (Staten Island Stapletons).

=== 19 ===
- Margaret A. Edwards, 85, American librarian (Enoch Pratt Free Library, American Library Association).
- Kwon Ki-ok, 87, first Korean female aviator.
- Jonasz Kofta, 45, Polish songwriter and poet, choking.
- Jeanne Rowe Skinner, 71, American Navy officer, First Lady of Guam.
- Albert Ross Tilley, 83, Canadian plastic surgeon, pioneered treatment of burned airmen.

=== 20 ===
- Héctor Félix Miranda, 46, Mexican journalist, columnist of the Zeta magazine, assassinated.
- Osias Godin, 76, Canadian politician, member of the House of Commons of Canada (1958-1965).
- Robert Jehle, 35, Swiss Olympic handball player (1980).
- Rémi Schelcher, 82, French Olympic sailor (1936).

=== 21 ===
- Carl Årmann, 93, Swedish army officer and Olympian (1924).
- Andrzej Czabański, 28, Polish murderer, last person executed in Poland.
- I. A. L. Diamond, 67, Romanian-born American screenwriter (Some Like It Hot, The Apartment), multiple myeloma.
- Princess Nadejda Petrovna of Russia, 90, Russian-French woman, child of Grand Duke Peter Nikolaevich of Russia.
- Buddy Humphrey, 52, American NFL footballer (St. Louis Cardinals), brain tumour.
- Luke Lindon, 72, American NFL player (Detroit Lions).
- Morris Rudensky, 89, American prohibition-era gangster.

=== 22 ===
- Len Church, 46, American MLB player (Chicago Cubs).
- Johnny Egan, 90, Australian rules footballer.
- Cyril Fordham, 81, English cricketer.
- Peter Helck, 94, American illustrator.
- Hugh S. Knowles, 83, American acoustical engineer and inventor, president of the Acoustical Society of America, cancer.
- Helge Meuller, 79, Swedish Olympic sports shooter (1936).
- Melvin Price, 83, American politician, member of U.S. House of Representatives (1945-1988), pancreatic cancer.
- Irene Rich, 96, American film and radio actress (Queen of the Yukon, Fort Apache), heart failure.
- Barbara Robison, 42, American singer (The Peanut Butter Conspiracy), toxic shock syndrome.
- Tchicaya U Tam'si, 56, Congolese author.

=== 23 ===
- Axel Grönberg, 69, Swedish Olympic Greco-Roman wrestler (1948, 1952).
- Karl Leonhard, 84, German psychiatrist.
- Henry Newman, 81, Australian cricketer.
- Eitaro Ozawa, 79, Japanese film and stage actor and director.
- Michael Ramsey, 83, British Church of England bishop, Archbishop of Canterbury.
- Adolf Rubi, 83, Swiss Olympic skier (1928).
- Gill Stegall, 26, American football player.

=== 24 ===
- Gioacchino Colombo, 85, Italian automobile engine designer (Ferrari Colombo engine).
- Bram Groeneweg, 83, Dutch Olympic long-distance runner (1928).
- Macon M. Long, 103, American politician, member of the Virginia House of Delegates and Senate.
- Alexander Makinsky, 87, Iranian-born American businessman, assistant vice president of the Rockefeller Foundation.
- Kenneth Payne, 75, British Olympic rower (1932).
- Cecil Smith, 60, Canadian politician, member of the House of Commons of Canada (1974-1979).
- Pavel Wonka, 35, Czech political activist, pulmonary embolism.
- Jonathan Woodner, 44, American real estate developer and road racing driver, air crash.

=== 25 ===
- René Cardona, 82, Mexican director and actor, (Allá en el Rancho Grande, Santa Claus).
- Lygia Clark, 67, Brazilian artist, co-founded the Neo-Concrete movement, heart attack.
- Carolyn Franklin, 43, American singer-songwriter, sister of Aretha Franklin ("Ain't No Way"), breast cancer.
- Erik Hysén, 81, Swedish footballer (IFK Göteborg).
- Ken Jones, 60, British conductor and composer of film and television music.
- Michael Lantz, 80, American sculptor, president of the National Sculpture Society, stroke.
- Burnita Shelton Matthews, 93, American judge of the United States District Court, stroke.
- Ferenc Pataki, 70, Hungarian Olympic gymnast (1948, 1952).
- Sir Hugh Rankin, 88–89, Tunisian-born British eccentric, president of the British Muslim Society.
- Lanny Ross, 82, American singer, pianist and songwriter, heart failure.
- Clifford D. Simak, 83, American science fiction writer (Way Station, The Visitors).
- Valerie Solanas, 52, American author and feminist, attempted to murder Andy Warhol, pneumonia.
- Zephyr Wright, 72–73, American civil rights activist and personal chef for President Lyndon Johnson, heart condition.

=== 26 ===
- Guy Boyd, 64, Australian potter and sculptor, coronary atherosclerosis.
- Paul Buckley, 74, Australian rules footballer.
- William Fox-Pitt, 92, English general in the British Army.
- Alf Hansen, 88, Norwegian footballer.
- Guillermo Haro, 75, Mexican astronomer (Herbig–Haro objects).
- Desmond Hoare, 77, British Royal Navy engineer officer.
- Frederick D. Patterson, 86, American academic administrator, founder of the United Negro College Fund, heart attack.
- Marian Porwit, 92, Polish military officer, colonel in the Polish Army.
- Bennett Stewart, 75, American politician, member of U.S. House of Representatives (1979-1981).
- Arbee Stidham, 71, American blues singer ("My Heart Belongs to You").

=== 27 ===
- Fred Bear, 86, American bow hunter and manufacturer, co-founder of Bear Archery, heart attack.
- Christina Bellin, 48, Italian-born American model, brain tumour.
- Jack Fleischman, 86, American NFL player (Providence Steamrollers).
- Valery Legasov, 51, Soviet chemist, chief of Chernobyl disaster investigation commission, suicide.
- David Scarboro, 20, English actor (EastEnders).
- Arnie Shockley, 84, American NFL player (Boston Bulldogs).
- Tommy Thomas, 88, American MLB player (Chicago White Sox, Washington Senators, St. Louis Browns).
- Robert Van Pelt, 90, American attorney, US district judge.
- Olaf Wieghorst, 88, Danish-born American painter.

=== 28 ===
- Fenner Brockway, 99, British socialist politician and anti-war activist, member of the House of Lords.
- William Potter Gale, 71, American political activist and white supremacist, emphysema.
- Michael Grumley, 45, American writer and artist (New York Native), AIDS.
- Hagop Hagopian, 36–37, leader of the Armenian Secret Army for the Liberation of Armenia, assassinated.
- Maxim Mazumdar, 36, Indian-born Canadian playwright and director (Oscar Remembered), AIDS.
- Bob Robson, 30, American soccer player.
- B. W. Stevenson, 38, American country pop singer and musician ("My Maria"), staph infection.

=== 29 ===
- Brish Bhan, 79, Indian politician, Chief Minister of Patiala and East Punjab States Union.
- Andrew Cruickshank, 80, Scottish actor (Dr. Finlay's Casebook).
- Dom Dallessandro, 74, American MLB player (Boston Red Sox, Chicago Cubs).
- Harold Dickinson, 79, Australian rules footballer.
- Irving Kolodin, 80, American music critic and historian (New York Sun, Saturday Review).
- James McCracken, 61, American operatic tenor, stroke.
- Jakob Tuggener, 84, Swiss photographer, filmmaker and painter.
- Martin Wyldeck, 74, English actor.

=== 30 ===
- Yehiel Duvdevani, 91-92, Israeli politician, member of the Knesset (1949-1951).
- Lola Hoffmann, 84, Latvian-born Chilean physiologist and psychiatrist.
- Iwakaze Kakutaro, 54, Japanese sumo wrestler.
- Man Mountain Mike, 47, American professional wrestler, staph infection.
- Carroll Righter, 88, American "astrologer".
- Alex Sanders, 61, English occultist, Wiccan high priest, lung cancer.
- Robert Leslie Stewart, 70, Scottish executioner.
- Tiger Joe Tomasso, 65–66, Canadian professional wrestler.
