= Deaths in August 1997 =

The following is a list of notable deaths in August 1997.

Entries for each day are listed alphabetically by surname. A typical entry lists information in the following sequence:

- Name, age, country of citizenship at birth, subsequent country of citizenship (if applicable), reason for notability, cause of death (if known), and reference.

== August 1997 ==
=== 1 ===
- Kenneth W. Bilby, 78, American RCA executive, leukemia.
- Berta Alves de Sousa, 91, Portuguese pianist and composer.
- Ngiratkel Etpison, 73, Palauan politician.
- Dame Bertha Isaacs, 97, Bahamian teacher, tennis player, politician and women's rights activist.
- Lawrence Alexander Sidney Johnson, 72, Australian taxonomic botanist, cancer.
- Angel Acuña Lizaña, 78, Mexican Olympic basketball player (1948).
- Norio Nagayama, 48, Japanese spree killer and novelist, execution by hanging.
- Gene Richardson, 69, American baseball player.
- Sviatoslav Richter, 82, Ukrainian pianist, heart attack.
- Janet G. Travell, 95, American physician and medical researcher, heart failure.
- Hans von Luck, 86, German Wehrmacht officer during World War II.

=== 2 ===
- William S. Burroughs, 83, American author (Naked Lunch, Junkie) and visual artist, heart attack.
- John Churcher, 91, British army general.
- Antonis Daglis, Greek serial killer, suicide by hanging.
- Joyce Dingwell, 89, Australian writer.
- Feim Ibrahimi, 61, Albanian composer.
- Harald Kihle, 92, Norwegian painter and illustrator.
- James Krüss, 71, German children's author and illustrator.
- Fela Kuti, 58, Nigerian musician and human rights activist, AIDS (disputed).
- Russ Mosley, 79, American football player (Green Bay Packers).
- Frank E. Smith, 79, American politician, member of the United States House of Representatives (1951-1962), complications from strokes.
- Ricardo Muñoz Suay, 79, Spanish film director, producer and screenwriter.
- Michèle Pujol, 46, French intellectual, feminist, and human rights activist, cancer.
- Rhydwen Williams, 80, Welsh poet, novelist and baptist minister.

=== 3 ===
- Peter A. Carruthers, 62, American physicist.
- Joan Erikson, 94, Austrian-Canadian author, educator, and dance ethnographer.
- Mladen Koščak, 60, Croatian football player and Olympian (1956).
- Pietro Rizzuto, 63, Canadian politician, member of the Senate of Canada (1976- ).
- Nirmal Chandra Sinha, 85–86, Indian tibetologist and author.
- Pete Willett, 95, American baseball player.

=== 4 ===
- Horace Bristol, 88, American photographer.
- Ces Burke, 83, New Zealand cricketer.
- Dick Bush, 65, British cinematographer (Tommy, Victor Victoria, Twins of Evil).
- Jeanne Calment, 122, French supercentenarian and the oldest person ever documented in history, senility.
- Tom Eckersley, 82, English poster artist and teacher of design.
- Nicholas J. Hoff, 91, Hungarian-American aeronautics and astronautic engineer.
- Gene Johnson, 61, American gridiron football player (Philadelphia Eagles, Minnesota Vikings, New York Giants).
- Jens Lundgaard, 86, Danish footballer.
- Lloyd Marshall, 83, American light heavyweight boxer.
- Ariel Maughan, 74, American basketball player.
- Ray Renfro, 67, American gridiron football player (Cleveland Browns).
- Sidney Simon, 80, American painter, sculptor, and muralist.
- Alexander Young, 58, Scottish musician, lung cancer.

=== 5 ===
- Dick Day, 77, Australian rules footballer.
- Clarence M. Kelley, 85, American politician and director of the FBI.
- Poul Møller, 77, Danish Conservative People's Party politician.
- Don Steele, 61, American disc jockey, lung cancer.
- Michael J. Tully Jr., 64, American lawyer and politician, heart attack.

=== 6 ===
- Lance Barnard, 78, Australian politician and diplomat.
- Bill Behr, 78, American basketball player.
- Maria Antonietta Beluzzi, 67, Italian actress, infarction.
- Birendra Kumar Bhattacharya, 72, Indian writer.
- Shin Ki-ha, 56, South Korean politician, plane crash.
- Jürgen Kuczynski, 92, German economist and communist.
- Tom Normanton, 80, British politician.
- John Porter, 93, Canadian ice hockey player and Olympian (1928).
- Noel Teggart, 55, Irish Olympic cyclist (1972).
- Samuel Paul Welles, 89, American palaeontologist.
- Bora Öztürk, 42, Turkish football player, cancer.

=== 7 ===
- Rudolf Blügel, 70, German politician and member of the Bundestag.
- Jules Goedhuys, 92, Belgian racing cyclist.
- Kay Halle, 93, American journalist, author and World War II OSS operative.
- Elisabeth Höngen, 90, German operatic mezzo-soprano and actress.
- Eugene Langenraedt, 90, Belgian Olympic sprinter (1928).
- Robert Major, 82, Canadian politician, member of the House of Commons of Canada (1968-1972).
- Volker Prechtel, 55, German actor, cancer.
- Léon Spartz, 70, Luxembourgian Olympic footballer (1952).

=== 8 ===
- Joseph Aquilina, 78, Maltese author and linguist.
- Orville H. Hampton, 80, American screenwriter.
- Dardanelle Hadley, 79, American jazz musician.
- William Lithgow, 77, English cricketer.
- Plato Malozemoff, 87, Russian-American engineer and businessman, congestive heart failure.
- Paul Rudolph, 78, American architect, peritoneal mesothelioma.
- Oad Swigart, 82, American baseball player (Pittsburgh Pirates).

=== 9 ===
- Doug Adams, 47, American gridiron football player (Cincinnati Bengals).
- Max Bloesch, 89, Swiss Olympic handball player (1936).
- Gabriel Cattand, 73, French actor.
- Herbert de Souza, 61, American sociologist and activist, AIDS-related complications.
- Ilpo Koskela, 52, Finnish ice hockey player and Olympian (1968, 1972).
- Trần Đại Nghĩa, 83, Vietnamese scientist and military engineer.

=== 10 ===
- Peter Braestrup, 66–67, American journalist, heart attack.
- Valery Chaptynov, 52, Russian politician.
- Roy Chipman, 58, American basketball coach, colorectal cancer.
- Malú Gatica, 75, Chilean actress and singer.
- William Jordy, 80, American architectural historian.
- Steve Kraftcheck, 68, Canadian ice hockey player (Boston Bruins, New York Rangers, Toronto Maple Leafs).
- Jean-Claude Lauzon, 43, Canadian filmmaker and screenwriter, plane crash.
- Carlton Moss, 88, American screenwriter, actor and film director.
- Conlon Nancarrow, 84, American-Mexican composer.
- Marie-Soleil Tougas, 27, Canadian actress and tv host, plane crash.
- Bob Welborn, 69, American racing driver.
- George Zames, 63, Polish-Canadian control theorist and professor.

=== 11 ===
- Miksa Bondi, 79, Hungarian Olympic boxer (1948).
- Bert McTaggart, 81, Australian rules footballer.
- Frank Pearson, 77, American Negro league baseball player.
- Jacques Robert, 76, French author, screenwriter and journalist.

=== 12 ===
- Luther Allison, 57, American blues guitarist, cancer.
- Anna Balakian, 82, Armenian-American professor of comparative literature, congestive heart failure.
- Rex Barney, 72, American baseball player (Brooklyn Dodgers).
- Ambrogio Bessi, 82, Italian Olympic basketball player (1936).
- Gösta Bohman, 86, Swedish politician.
- Jack Delano, 83, American photographer, kidney failure.
- Rob Denton, 89, American soccer player and Olympian (1936).
- Keith Harper, 70, Australian rules football player.
- Robert Hetzron, 58, Hungarian-born linguist.
- Gulshan Kumar, 46, Indian businessman and film producer, shot.
- Dick Marx, 73, American jazz pianist and arranger, traffic collision.
- Mario Montuori, 77, Italian film cinematographer and painter.
- Abe Newborn, 77, American talent agent and theatre producer, congestive heart failure.
- Sam Nolutshungu, 52, South African academic, cancer.
- Len Norris, 83, Canadian editorial cartoonist.
- Achilles Papapetrou, 90, Greek theoretical physicist.
- Albert L. Smith, Jr., 65, American politician, member of the United States House of Representatives (1981-1983).
- Conrad von Molo, 90, Austrian film producer and editor.
- Ali Yata, 76, Moroccan communist leader.

=== 13 ===
- Vladimir Gribov, 67, Soviet and Russian theoretical physicist.
- António de Herédia, 96, Portuguese Olympic sailor (1928, 1936, 1948).
- Robert L. Leggett, 71, American politician, member of the United States House of Representatives (1963-1979).
- Dick Mather, 56, Canadian politician, heart attack.
- Emil Mosbacher, 75, American yachtsman and Chief of Protocol of the United States, cancer.
- Harlow Rothert, 89, American Olympic shot putter (1928, 1932).
- Marjorie Lynette Sigley, 68, English artist, writer, actress, choreographer and theatre director, cancer.
- Carel Weight, 88, English painter.

=== 14 ===
- John Elliot, 79, British novelist, screenwriter and television producer.
- Charlie Fleming, 70, Scottish footballer.
- Diana E. Forsythe, 49, American anthropology researcher, hiking accident.
- Frederick Carl Galda, 79, American attorney and politician.
- George Pfister, 78, American baseball player (Brooklyn Dodgers), and coach, heart attack.
- Guido Vincenzi, 65, Italian football player and manager, A.L.S.

=== 15 ===
- Ida Gerhardt, 92, Dutch writer and poet.
- Ray Heatherton, 88, American singer, Broadway performer and television personality, Alzheimer's disease.
- Lubka Kolessa, 95, Canadian-Ukrainian pianist and educator.
- Lawrence Morgan, 82, Australian rules footballer, equestrian and Olympian (1960).
- Steve Pruski, 73, Canadian football player.
- Dave Solomon, 84, Fijian-New Zealand rugby player and coach.
- Çesk Zadeja, 70, Albanian composer.

=== 16 ===
- Yanick Dupré, 24, Canadian ice hockey player (Philadelphia Flyers), leukemia.
- Nusrat Fateh Ali Khan, 48, Pakistani Qawwali musician, heart attack.
- Robert Lang, 80, Swiss cyclist.
- Alf Malland, 80, Norwegian actor.
- Plum Mariko, 29, Japanese female professional wrestler, wrestling accident.
- Jacques Pollet, 75, French racing driver.
- Donn Reynolds, 76, Canadian country music singer and yodeler.
- Hendrik van den Bergh, 82, South African police official.
- Roger Vrigny, 77, French writer.

=== 17 ===
- Burnum Burnum, 61, Australian Aboriginal activist, actor, and author, heart disease.
- Secondo Magni, 85, Italian racing cyclist.
- Don Owens, 65, American gridiron football player (Washington Redskins, Philadelphia Eagles, St. Louis Cardinals).
- David Schweitzer, 72, Israeli football player and manager.
- Richard Skalak, 74, American biomedical engineering pioneer.

=== 18 ===
- Praphas Charusathien, 84, Thai military officer and politician.
- Fedor Hanžeković, 84, Croatian film director.
- Don Knight, 64, English actor (The Apple Dumpling Gang, Swamp Thing, The Hawaiians), stroke.
- Ante Pivčević, 71, Croatian Olympic sailor (1960).
- Maria Prymachenko, 89, Ukrainian folk art painter.
- Frank P. Sanders, 78, American Under Secretary of the Navy (1972–73).
- Robert Swenson, 40, American professional wrestler (WCCW) and actor (Batman & Robin, Bulletproof), heart failure.
- Tochiakagi Takanori, 42, Japanese sumo wrestler.
- Harry R. Wellman, 98, American academic.

=== 19 ===
- Cathleen Cordell, 82, American actress, emphysema.
- René van Hove, 84, Dutch Olympic cyclist (1936).
- Jim Karcher, 83, American gridiron football player (Boston/Washington Redskins).
- Robson Lowe, 92, English philatelist, stamp dealer and stamp auctioneer.
- Petr Novák, 51, Czech rock musician, poisoned.
- Mario Velarde, 57, Mexican football player.

=== 20 ===
- Scott Armstrong, 83, American basketball player.
- Norris Bradbury, 88, American physicist, infectious disease.
- William Humphrey, 73, American writer, cancer.
- Leo Jaffe, 88, American film executive.
- Bob Switzer, 83, American inventor, businessman and environmentalist, Parkinson's disease.

=== 21 ===
- Misael Pastrana Borrero, 73, President of Colombia.
- Somers Cox, 86, New Zealand Olympic rower (1932).
- Abdul Rahim Ghafoorzai, Afghani politician and diplomat, prime minister of afghanistan (since 1997), plane crash.
- Jean Horsley, 84, New Zealand artist.
- William Jopling, 86, Italian-British leprologist.
- Guillermo Molina, 88, American baseball player.
- Yuri Nikulin, 75, Soviet/Russian actor and clown, heart failure.

=== 22 ===
- Prince Álvaro of Orleans, 87, Spanish noble and Infante.
- James Edmund Jeffries, 72, American politician, member of the United States House of Representatives (1979-1983).
- James K. Johnson, 81, United States Air Force officer.
- François Lachenal, 79, Swiss publisher and diplomat.
- Eduardo Lopes, 79, Portuguese road and track cyclist, cerebral vascular accident.
- Bill MacIntosh, 66, Canadian Olympic sailor (1952).
- Matti Sippala, 89, Finnish athlete and Olympian (1932).
- Robin Skelton, 71, British-Canadian academic, writer, poet, and anthologist.
- Mary Louise Smith, 82, American politician and women's rights activist, lung cancer.
- Brendan Smyth, 70, Northern Irish Roman Catholic priest and convicted child molester, heart attack.
- Virgil Wagner, 75, Canadian football player.
- Roy Zimmerman, 79, American gridiron football player.

=== 23 ===
- Mike Calhoun, 40, American football player (Chicago Bears, San Francisco 49ers, Tampa Bay Buccaneers).
- Guy Curtright, 84, American baseball player (Chicago White Sox).
- Eric Gairy, 75, Prime Minister of Grenada (1974–1979).
- Jack Harris, 95, Canadian Olympic middle-distance runner (1924).
- Buddy Hassett, 85, American baseball player (Brooklyn Dodgers, Boston Bees/Braves, New York Yankees), bone cancer.
- Lucy Somerville Howorth, 102, American lawyer, feminist and politician.
- Sir John Kendrew, 80, British molecular biologist, recipient of the Nobel Prize in Chemistry.
- Elena Mayorova, 39, Soviet and Russian actress, burns.
- Jean Poperen, 72, French politician.
- Jan Šejna, 70, Czechoslovak Army Major General and defector.

=== 24 ===
- Werner Abrolat, 73, German actor.
- Davide Ancilotto, 23, Italian basketball player, brain ischemia during game.
- Hardial Bains, 58, Indian-Canadian microbiology lecturer and communist politician, cancer.
- Rex Ellsworth, 89, American thoroughbred horse breeder.
- Louis Essen, 88, English physicist.
- Tete Montoliu, 64, Spanish jazz pianist, lung cancer.
- Zofia Rydet, 86, Polish photographer.
- Edgar F. Shannon, Jr., 79, American university director, cancer.
- Luigi Villoresi, 88, Italian motor racing driver.

=== 25 ===
- Clodomiro Almeyda, 74, Chilean politician, colon cancer.
- Mauro Cristofani, 56, Linguist and researcher in Etruscan studies.
- Muriel Frances Dana, 80, American silent film era child actress.
- Peter Dews, 67, British stage director.
- James Gould, 83, New Zealand rower.
- Carl Richard Jacobi, 89, American journalist and author.
- Füreya Koral, 87, Turkish ceramics artist.
- Noé Murayama, 67, Mexican actor.
- Bijan Najdi, 55, Iranian writer and poet.
- Robert Pinget, 78, French avant-garde writer.
- Camilla Spira, 91, German actress.
- Vitaly Tulenev, 60, Soviet and Russian painter, visual artist and art teacher.

=== 26 ===
- Marcello Aliprandi, 63, Italian film director.
- Peter Bakonyi, 64, Hungarian-born Canadian fencer and Olympian (1968).
- Hone Glendinning, 85, British cinematographer.
- William Kenneth Kiernan, 81, Canadian businessman and politician.
- Brendan McCarthy, 52, American football player (Atlanta Falcons, Denver Broncos), heart attack.

=== 27 ===
- Saim Arıkan, 91, Turkish Olympic wrestler (1928, 1936).
- Sotiria Bellou, 76, Greek singer, cancer.
- Sally Blane, 87, American actress, cancer.
- Ing Chang-ki, 79, Chinese industrialist and Go player, cancer.
- Arthur Cutler, 84, New Zealand cricketer.
- Johannes Edfelt, 92, Swedish writer, poet, and literary critic.
- Noël Henderson, 69, Northern Irish rugby player.
- James Lindsay, 90, British politician.
- Dick N. Lucas, 77, American animator (The Fox and the Hound, One Hundred and One Dalmatians, The Rescuers).
- Samuel A. Peeples, 79, American writer, cancer.
- Brandon Tartikoff, 48, American television executive, Hodgkin's lymphoma.

=== 28 ===
- Frank Bencriscutto, 68, American concert band conductor and composer.
- Jim Bredar, 65, American college basketball player (Illinois Fighting Illini).
- Joyce Ebert, 64, American actress, cancer.
- Cesar Gaudard, 82, Swiss Olympic wrestler (1936).
- Tõnu Haljand, 52, Soviet Estonian skier and Olympian (1968).
- Werner Mieth, 85, American gridiron football player.
- Lou Scoffic, 84, American baseball player (St. Louis Cardinals).
- Peter Springett, 51, English footballer, cancer.
- Masaru Takumi, 61, Japanese yakuza lord, shot.
- Lloyd A. Thompson, 65, Nigerian classicist and academic.

=== 29 ===
- Richard Cottam, 72, American political scientist, Iranist and CIA operative.
- Osborne Cowles, 98, American basketball player and coach.
- Kansari Halder, 86, Indian politician.
- James Latane Noel Jr., 87, American district judge (United States District Court for the Southern District of Texas).
- Rudolf Pichlmayr, 65, German surgeon.
- Nelly Prono, 71, Paraguayan actress, cerebrovascular disease.
- Ernest Ziaja, 78, Polish Olympic ice hockey player (1948).

=== 30 ===
- John D. Craig, 94, American writer, film producer, and television host.
- Frunze Dovlatyan, 70, Armenian film director and actor.
- Toshiya Fujita, 65, Japanese film director, film actor, and screenwriter, liver failure.
- Dale Lewis, 64, American wrestler and Olympian (1956, 1960).
- Ernst Wilimowski, 81, German–Polish football player.
- Veselin Đuranović, 72, Montenegrin politician.

=== 31 ===
- Will Hare, 81, American actor (Back to the Future, The Rose, Silent Night, Deadly Night), heart attack.
- Heinz Kaufmann, 83, German rower.
- John M. Leddy, 83, United States Department of State official.
- Oscar Olson, 79, American basketball player.
- Lotus Weinstock, 54, American stand-up comedian, author, musician, and actress, brain tumor.
- People killed in the Pont de l'Alma car crash:
  - Diana, Princess of Wales, 36, British royal and ex-wife of future King Charles III, and activist.
  - Dodi Fayed, 42, Egyptian film producer (Chariots of Fire, Hook).
