= Wrestling at the 1932 Summer Olympics – Men's Greco-Roman bantamweight =

Men's Greco-Roman bantamweight at the Games of the X Olympiad
- Venue: Grand Olympic Auditorium
- Dates: 4–7 August
- Competitors: 7 from 7 nations

Medalists
1st place, gold medalist(s)		Jakob Brendel	Germany
2nd place, silver medalist(s)		Marcello Nizzola	Italy
3rd place, bronze medalist(s)		Louis François	France

The men's Greco-Roman bantamweight competition at the 1932 Summer Olympics in Los Angeles took place from 4 August to 7 August at the Grand Olympic Auditorium. Nations were limited to one competitor. This weight class was limited to wrestlers weighing up to 56kg.

This Greco-Roman wrestling competition followed the same format that was introduced at the 1928 Summer Olympics, using an elimination system based on the accumulation of points. Each round featured all wrestlers pairing off and wrestling one bout (with one wrestler having a bye if there were an odd number). The loser received 3 points. The winner received 1 point if the win was by decision and 0 points if the win was by fall. At the end of each round, any wrestler with at least 5 points was eliminated.

== Schedule ==
Date	Event
4 August 1932	Round 1
5 August 1932	Round 2
6 August 1932	Round 3 Round 4
7 August 1932	Final round

== Results ==
=== Round 1 ===
Three wrestlers finished the round with 0 points. One had 1 point. Three had 3 points.

Bouts

Winner	Nation	Victory Type	Loser	Nation
Jakob Brendel	Germany	Fall	Aatos Jaskari	Finland
Herman Tuvesson	Sweden	Decision	Louis François	France
Marcello Nizzola	Italy	Fall	László Szekfű	Hungary
Georges Zervinis	Greece	Bye	N/A	N/A

Points

Rank	Wrestler	Nation	Start	Earned	Total
1	Jakob Brendel	Germany	0	0	0
1	Marcello Nizzola	Italy	0	0	0
1	Georges Zervinis	Greece	0	0	0
4	Herman Thuvesson	Sweden	0	1	1
5	Louis François	France	0	3	3
5	Aatos Jaskari	Finland	0	3	3
5	Ladislas Szekfü	Hungary	0	3	3

=== Round 2 ===
Nizzola had a bye, maintaining his 0 point total. Brendel received his first point by winning by decision. Thuvesson's second consecutive win by decision gave him a total of 2 points. Zervinis's first bout (after a bye) was a loss, resulting in 3 points. François won by decision, adding 1 points to his previous 3 for a total of 4. Jaskari and Szekfü, losers in both the first two rounds, were eliminated.

Bouts

Winner	Nation	Victory Type	Loser	Nation
Jakob Brendel	Germany	Decision	Georges Zervinis	Greece
Herman Thuvesson	Sweden	Decision	Aatos Jaskari	Finland
Louis François	France	Decision	Ladislas Szekfü	Hungary
Marcello Nizzola	Italy	Bye	N/A	N/A

Points

Rank	Wrestler	Nation	Start	Earned	Total
1	Marcello Nizzola	Italy	0	0	0
2	Jakob Brendel	Germany	0	1	1
3	Herman Thuvesson	Sweden	1	1	2
4	Georges Zervinis	Greece	0	3	3
5	Louis François	France	3	1	4
6	Aatos Jaskari	Finland	3	3	6
6	Ladislas Szekfü	Hungary	3	3	6

=== Round 3 ===
Nizzola's perfect score ended with a win by decision and 1 point. Brendel's third win and second by decision gave him a total of 2 points. François had a bye, staying on 4 points. Zervinis (0–2 after a bye) and Thuvesson (2–1, but both wins by decision) were eliminated.

Bouts

Winner	Nation	Victory Type	Loser	Nation
Marcello Nizzola	Italy	Decision	Georges Zervinis	Greece
Jakob Brendel	Germany	Decision	Herman Thuvesson	Sweden
Louis François	France	Bye	N/A	N/A

Points

Rank	Wrestler	Nation	Start	Earned	Total
1	Marcello Nizzola	Italy	0	1	1
2	Jakob Brendel	Germany	1	1	2
3	Louis François	France	4	0	4
4	Herman Thuvesson	Sweden	2	3	5
5	Georges Zervinis	Greece	3	3	6

=== Round 4 ===
François defeated Nizzola in the only bout this round, but the winner (starting at 4 points and earning 1 due to winning by decision) was eliminated and the loser (who had made it three prior rounds with only 1 point) was not. François finished with the bronze medal, while Nizzola advanced to face Brendel (who had a bye in this round) in the final.

Bouts

Winner	Nation	Victory Type	Loser	Nation
Louis François	France	Decision	Marcello Nizzola	Italy
Jakob Brendel	Germany	Bye	N/A	N/A

Points

Rank	Wrestler	Nation	Start	Earned	Total
1	Jakob Brendel	Germany	2	0	2
2	Marcello Nizzola	Italy	1	3	4
3rd place, bronze medalist(s)	Louis François	France	4	1	5

=== Final round ===
Nizzola "gave up [the] contest" according to the Official Report. However, he was apparently dissatisfied with the result and "attacked Brendel with a knife, with a policeman intervening to prevent any serious injuries."

Bouts

Winner	Nation	Victory Type	Loser	Nation
Jakob Brendel	Germany	Decision	Marcello Nizzola	Italy

Points

Rank	Wrestler	Nation	Start	Earned	Total
1st place, gold medalist(s)	Jakob Brendel	Germany	2	0	2
2nd place, silver medalist(s)	Marcello Nizzola	Italy	4	3	7
