= Wrestling at the 1936 Summer Olympics – Men's freestyle bantamweight =

Men's freestyle bantamweight at the Games of the XI Olympiad
- Venue: Deutschlandhalle
- Dates: 2–5 August 1936
- Competitors: 14 from 14 nations

Medalists
1st place, gold medalist(s)		Ödön Zombori	Hungary
2nd place, silver medalist(s)		Ross Flood	United States
3rd place, bronze medalist(s)		Johannes Herbert	Germany

The men's freestyle bantamweight competition at the 1936 Summer Olympics in Berlin took place from 2 August to 5 August at the Deutschlandhalle. Nations were limited to one competitor. This weight class was limited to wrestlers weighing up to 56kg.

This freestyle wrestling competition continued to use the "bad points" elimination system introduced at the 1928 Summer Olympics for Greco-Roman and at the 1932 Summer Olympics for freestyle wrestling, with a slight modification. Each round featured all wrestlers pairing off and wrestling one bout (with one wrestler having a bye if there were an odd number). The loser received 3 points if the loss was by fall or unanimous decision and 2 points if the decision was 2-1 (this was the modification from prior years, where all losses were 3 points). The winner received 1 point if the win was by decision and 0 points if the win was by fall. At the end of each round, any wrestler with at least 5 points was eliminated.

== Schedule ==
Date	Event
2 August 1936	Round 1
3 August 1936	Round 2
4 August 1936	Round 3 Round 4
5 August 1936	Round 5 Round 6

== Results ==
=== Round 1 ===
The four wrestlers who won by fall took the lead, with 0 bad points. The three other winners by decision each received 1 point. All of the losers were defeated by either fall or unanimous decision, so each received 3 points.

Bouts

Winner	Nation	Victory Type	Loser	Nation
Ray Cazaux	Great Britain	Decision, 3–0	Kojiro Tamba	Japan
Johannes Herbert	Germany	Fall	Ahmet Çakıryıldız	Turkey
Ödön Zombori	Hungary	Fall	Gustave Laporte	Belgium
Marcello Nizzola	Italy	Fall	Antonín Nič	Czechoslovakia
Herman Tuvesson	Sweden	Decision, 3–0	Aatos Jaskari	Finland
Cesar Gaudard	Switzerland	Fall	Shankarrao Thorat	India
Ross Flood	United States	Decision, 3–0	Enrique Jurado	Philippines

Points

Rank	Wrestler	Nation	Start	Earned	Total
1	Cesar Gaudard	Switzerland	0	0	0
1	Johannes Herbert	Germany	0	0	0
1	Marcello Nizzola	Italy	0	0	0
1	Ödön Zombori	Hungary	0	0	0
5	Ray Cazaux	Great Britain	0	1	1
5	Ross Flood	United States	0	1	1
5	Herman Tuvesson	Sweden	0	1	1
8	Ahmet Çakiryildiz	Turkey	0	3	3
8	Aatos Jaskari	Finland	0	3	3
8	Enrique Jurado	Philippines	0	3	3
8	Gustave Laporte	Belgium	0	3	3
8	Antonín Nič	Czechoslovakia	0	3	3
8	Kojiro Tamba	Japan	0	3	3
8	Shankarrao Thorat	India	0	3	3

=== Round 2 ===
Herbert was the only wrestlers to win a second time by fall, staying at 0 points. Flood, Tuvesson, and Zombori all finished the round with 1 point, having won once by decision and once by fall. Nizzola's first points were a pair of points received for his loss by split decision to Zombori. Three men ended the round with 3 points, and two wrestlers had 4. The four competitors who lost in each of the first two rounds were eliminated.

Bouts

Winner	Nation	Victory Type	Loser	Nation
Ahmet Çakiryildiz	Turkey	Decision, 2–1	Kojiro Tamba	Japan
Johannes Herbert	Germany	Fall	Ray Cazaux	Great Britain
Gustave Laporte	Belgium	Fall	Antonín Nič	Czechoslovakia
Ödön Zombori	Hungary	Decision, 2–1	Marcello Nizzola	Italy
Herman Tuvesson	Sweden	Fall	Cesar Gaudard	Switzerland
Aatos Jaskari	Finland	Fall	Enrique Jurado	Philippines
Ross Flood	United States	Fall	Shankarrao Thorat	India

Points

Rank	Wrestler	Nation	Start	Earned	Total
1	Johannes Herbert	Germany	0	0	0
2	Ross Flood	United States	1	0	1
2	Herman Tuvesson	Sweden	1	0	1
2	Ödön Zombori	Hungary	0	1	1
5	Marcello Nizzola	Italy	0	2	2
6	Cesar Gaudard	Switzerland	0	3	3
6	Aatos Jaskari	Finland	3	0	3
6	Gustave Laporte	Belgium	3	0	3
9	Ahmet Çakiryildiz	Turkey	3	1	4
9	Ray Cazaux	Great Britain	1	3	4
11	Kojiro Tamba	Japan	3	2	5
12	Enrique Jurado	Philippines	3	3	6
12	Antonín Nič	Czechoslovakia	3	3	6
12	Shankarrao Thorat	India	3	3	6

=== Round 3 ===
Four more men suffered their second losses in this round and were eliminated with 5 points or more. Herbert continued to be the only wrestler with 0 points, winning a third bout by fall. Flood stayed at 1 point, but Tuvesson picked up a second. The three other wrestlers who remained in contention each had 4 points.

Bouts

Winner	Nation	Victory Type	Loser	Nation
Ahmet Çakiryildiz	Turkey	Fall	Ray Cazaux	Great Britain
Johannes Herbert	Germany	Fall	Gustave Laporte	Belgium
Herman Tuvesson	Sweden	Decision, 3–0	Ödön Zombori	Hungary
Aatos Jaskari	Finland	Decision, 3–0	Marcello Nizzola	Italy
Ross Flood	United States	Fall	Cesar Gaudard	Switzerland

Points

Rank	Wrestler	Nation	Start	Earned	Total
1	Johannes Herbert	Germany	0	0	0
2	Ross Flood	United States	1	0	1
2	Herman Tuvesson	Sweden	1	1	2
4	Ahmet Çakiryildiz	Turkey	4	0	4
4	Aatos Jaskari	Finland	3	1	4
4	Ödön Zombori	Hungary	1	3	4
7	Marcello Nizzola	Italy	2	3	5
8	Cesar Gaudard	Switzerland	3	3	6
8	Gustave Laporte	Belgium	3	3	6
9	Ray Cazaux	Great Britain	4	3	7

=== Round 4 ===
Herbert received his first points, 2 for a split-decision loss to Tuvesson. This moved Tuvesson from 2 points to 3, leaving Flood (who won by fall in the round) in the lead at 1 point. Jaskari and Çakiryildiz were eliminated with their losses. The official report placed Jaskari 5th and Çakiryildiz 6th.

Bouts

Winner	Nation	Victory Type	Loser	Nation
Ödön Zombori	Hungary	Fall	Ahmet Çakiryildiz	Turkey
Herman Tuvesson	Sweden	Decision, 2–1	Johannes Herbert	Germany
Ross Flood	United States	Fall	Aatos Jaskari	Finland

Points

Rank	Wrestler	Nation	Start	Earned	Total
1	Ross Flood	United States	1	0	1
2	Johannes Herbert	Germany	0	2	2
3	Herman Tuvesson	Sweden	2	1	3
4	Ödön Zombori	Hungary	4	0	4
5	Aatos Jaskari	Finland	4	3	7
6	Ahmet Çakiryildiz	Turkey	4	3	7

=== Round 5 ===
After keeping a perfect record through three rounds, Herbert's consecutive losses in rounds 4 and 5 resulted in his elimination. As he finished with fewer bad points than Tuvesson who was also eliminated in this round, however, Herbert earned the bronze medal. Tuvesson finished fourth despite losing only once; his previous three wins by decision gave him too many points to continue after a single defeat. Zombori hung on for the second straight round after reaching 4 points in round 3. Flood picked up a second point in the win by decision over Tuvesson.

Bouts

Winner	Nation	Victory Type	Loser	Nation
Ödön Zombori	Hungary	Fall	Johannes Herbert	Germany
Ross Flood	United States	Decision, 3–0	Herman Tuvesson	Sweden

Points

Rank	Wrestler	Nation	Start	Earned	Total
1	Ross Flood	United States	1	1	2
2	Ödön Zombori	Hungary	4	0	4
3rd place, bronze medalist(s)	Johannes Herbert	Germany	2	3	5
4	Herman Tuvesson	Sweden	3	3	6

=== Round 6 ===
Zombori won his third consecutive match by fall, winning the gold medal after being pushed to the brink of elimination in the third round. Flood finished with the silver medal.

Bouts

Winner	Nation	Victory Type	Loser	Nation
Ödön Zombori	Hungary	Fall	Ross Flood	United States

Points

Rank	Wrestler	Nation	Start	Earned	Total
1st place, gold medalist(s)	Ödön Zombori	Hungary	4	0	4
2nd place, silver medalist(s)	Ross Flood	United States	2	3	5
