= Wrestling at the 1932 Summer Olympics – Men's freestyle bantamweight =

Men's freestyle bantamweight at the Games of the X Olympiad
- Venue: Grand Olympic Auditorium
- Dates: 1–3 August 1932
- Competitors: 8 from 8 nations

Medalists
1st place, gold medalist(s)		Robert Pearce	United States
2nd place, silver medalist(s)		Ödön Zombori	Hungary
3rd place, bronze medalist(s)		Aatos Jaskari	Finland

The men's freestyle bantamweight competition at the 1932 Summer Olympics in Los Angeles took place from 1 August to 3 August at the Grand Olympic Auditorium. Nations were limited to one competitor. This weight class was limited to wrestlers weighing up to 56 kg.

This freestyle wrestling competition did not use the single-elimination bracket format previously used for Olympic freestyle wrestling but instead followed the format that was introduced at the 1928 Summer Olympics for Greco-Roman wrestling, using an elimination system based on the accumulation of points. Each round featured all wrestlers pairing off and wrestling one bout (with one wrestler having a bye if there were an odd number). The loser received 3 points. The winner received 1 point if the win was by decision and 0 points if the win was by fall. At the end of each round, any wrestler with at least 5 points was eliminated.

== Schedule ==
Date	Event
1 August 1932	Round 1
2 August 1932	Round 2
3 August 1932	Round 3 Final round

== Results ==
=== Round 1 ===
Two wrestlers won by fall, advancing with 0 points. Two won by decision, moving to the second round with 1 point. Four lost, receiving 3 points.

Bouts

Winner	Nation	Victory Type	Loser	Nation
Robert Pearce	United States	Decision	Ödön Zombori	Hungary
Julien Depuychaffray	France	Decision	Bror Vingren	Sweden
Aatos Jaskari	Finland	Fall	Joseph Reid	Great Britain
Georges Zervinis	Greece	Fall	James Trifunov	Canada

Points

Rank	Wrestler	Nation	Start	Earned	Total
1	Aatos Jaskari	Finland	0	0	0
1	Georges Zervinis	Greece	0	0	0
3	Julien Depuichaffray	France	0	1	1
3	Robert Pearce	United States	0	1	1
5	Joseph Reid	Great Britain	0	3	3
5	James Trifunov	Canada	0	3	3
5	Bror Wingren	Sweden	0	3	3
5	Ödön Zombori	Hungary	0	3	3

=== Round 2 ===
Jaskari won his second bout by fall, remaining at 0 points. Zervinis, the other wrestler with 0 points after one round, lost to move to 3 points. Pearce had a second consecutive win by decision, adding a second point, while Depuichaffray's loss added 3 points to his previous 1. Of the first-round losers, Zombori and Reid survived; the former won by fall to stay at 3 points while the latter earned a 4th point by winning by decision. Trifunov and Wingren each lost their second bout and were eliminated.

Bouts

Winner	Nation	Victory Type	Loser	Nation
Robert Pearce	United States	Decision	Julien Depuichaffray	France
Ödön Zombori	Hungary	Fall	Bror Wingren	Sweden
Joseph Reid	Great Britain	Decision	Georges Zervinis	Greece
Aatos Jaskari	Finland	Fall	James Trifunov	Canada

Points

Rank	Wrestler	Nation	Start	Earned	Total
1	Aatos Jaskari	Finland	0	0	0
2	Robert Pearce	United States	1	1	2
3	Georges Zervinis	Greece	0	3	3
3	Ödön Zombori	Hungary	3	0	3
5	Julien Depuichaffray	France	1	3	4
5	Joseph Reid	Great Britain	3	1	4
7	James Trifunov	Canada	3	3	6
7	Bror Wingren	Sweden	3	3	6

=== Round 3 ===
All three bouts were won by decision in this round. All three winners earned medals, as the three losers were eliminated.

Bouts

Winner	Nation	Victory Type	Loser	Nation
Robert Pearce	United States	Decision	Joseph Reid	Great Britain
Ödön Zombori	Hungary	Decision	Julien Depuichaffray	France
Aatos Jaskari	Finland	Decision	Georges Zervinis	Greece

Points

Rank	Wrestler	Nation	Start	Earned	Total
1	Aatos Jaskari	Finland	0	1	1
2	Robert Pearce	United States	2	1	3
3	Ödön Zombori	Hungary	3	1	4
4	Georges Zervinis	Greece	3	3	6
5	Julien Depuichaffray	France	4	3	7
5	Joseph Reid	Great Britain	4	3	7

=== Final round ===
Pearce's win over Jaskari put all four wrestlers at 4 points. Zombori and Jaskari had not yet faced each other, while Pearce had wrestled both men and won. The bout between Zombori and Jaskari was therefore effectively a silver/bronze bout. Zombori won by decision to take the silver medal.

Bouts

Winner	Nation	Victory Type	Loser	Nation
Robert Pearce	United States	Decision	Aatos Jaskari	Finland
Ödön Zombori	Hungary	Decision	Aatos Jaskari	Finland

Points

Rank	Wrestler	Nation	Start	Earned	Total
1st place, gold medalist(s)	Robert Pearce	United States	3	1	4
2nd place, silver medalist(s)	Ödön Zombori	Hungary	4	1	5
3rd place, bronze medalist(s)	Aatos Jaskari	Finland	1	6	7
