= Mrityunjay (Book) =

Political Science Book

- Author: Birendra Kumar Bhattacharya
- Original title: মৃত্যুঞ্জয়
- Language: Assamese
- Subject: Assam
- Genre: Political Science fiction
- Set in: Quit India movement
- Publisher: Chandra Prakash, Sterling
- Publication date: 1970
- Publication place: India
- English publication date: 1983
- Media type: Print
- Pages: 290
- Awards: Jnanpith Award
- ISBN: 978-0-86578-135-1
- OCLC: 62923015

Mrityunjay (transl. - Immortal) is an Assamese language fiction book written by Birendra Kumar Bhattacharya in 1970. The book won the highest Indian literary award Jnanpith Award in 1979. It is the first Assamese language book to receive the award, and Bhattacharya became the first Assamese Jnanpith Award recipient, followed by Mamoni Raisom Goswami. He also won Sahitya Akademi Award for his novel Yaruingam in 1961.

The book was translated to English, Hindi and Bengali languages.

== Premise ==
Set during the 1942's Quit India movement in Assam, the novel explores the reactions and moral dilemmas of the regional inhabitants as they changes their path from Gandhian non-violence to accept necessary armed rebellion and bloodshed against British colonial rule.

== Reception ==
Malaya Khaund writes for Indian Literature journal, "Mrityunjay is a reflection of the young Birendra Kumar's response to and association with India's historic freedom movement." Indian and Foreign Review wrote "well be de- scribed as an Epic of the stress".

== Awards ==
- Jnanpith Award in 1979.
