= Richard Day =

Richard Day may refer to:

- Richard J. F. Day (born c. 1964), professor of sociology and cultural studies at Queen's University, Canada, scholar-activist
- Richard Day (printer) (1552–before 1607), English printer and clergyman
- Richard R. Day, professor of language learning at the University of Hawaii
- Richard Day (writer), American film and television writer, producer and director
- Richard Day (art director) (1896–1972), Canadian art director
- Dick Day (born 1937), American politician
- Dick Day (footballer) (born 1920), former Australian rules footballer
- Richard Digby Day (born 1941), British stage director
- Richard W. Day (1916–1978), principal of Phillips Exeter Academy
