= Nizzola =

Nizzola is an Italian surname. Notable people with the surname include:

- Marcello Nizzola (1900–1947), Italian Olympic wrestler, father of Garibaldo
- Garibaldo Nizzola (1927–2012), Italian Olympic wrestler, son of Marcello
