= Vingren =

Vingren is a surname. Notable people with the surname include:

- Bror Vingren (1906–1980), Swedish wrestler
- Gunnar Vingren (1879–1933), Swedish evangelist
