= Save the Brahmaputra River =

Environmental campaign relates to the River Brahmaputra in India

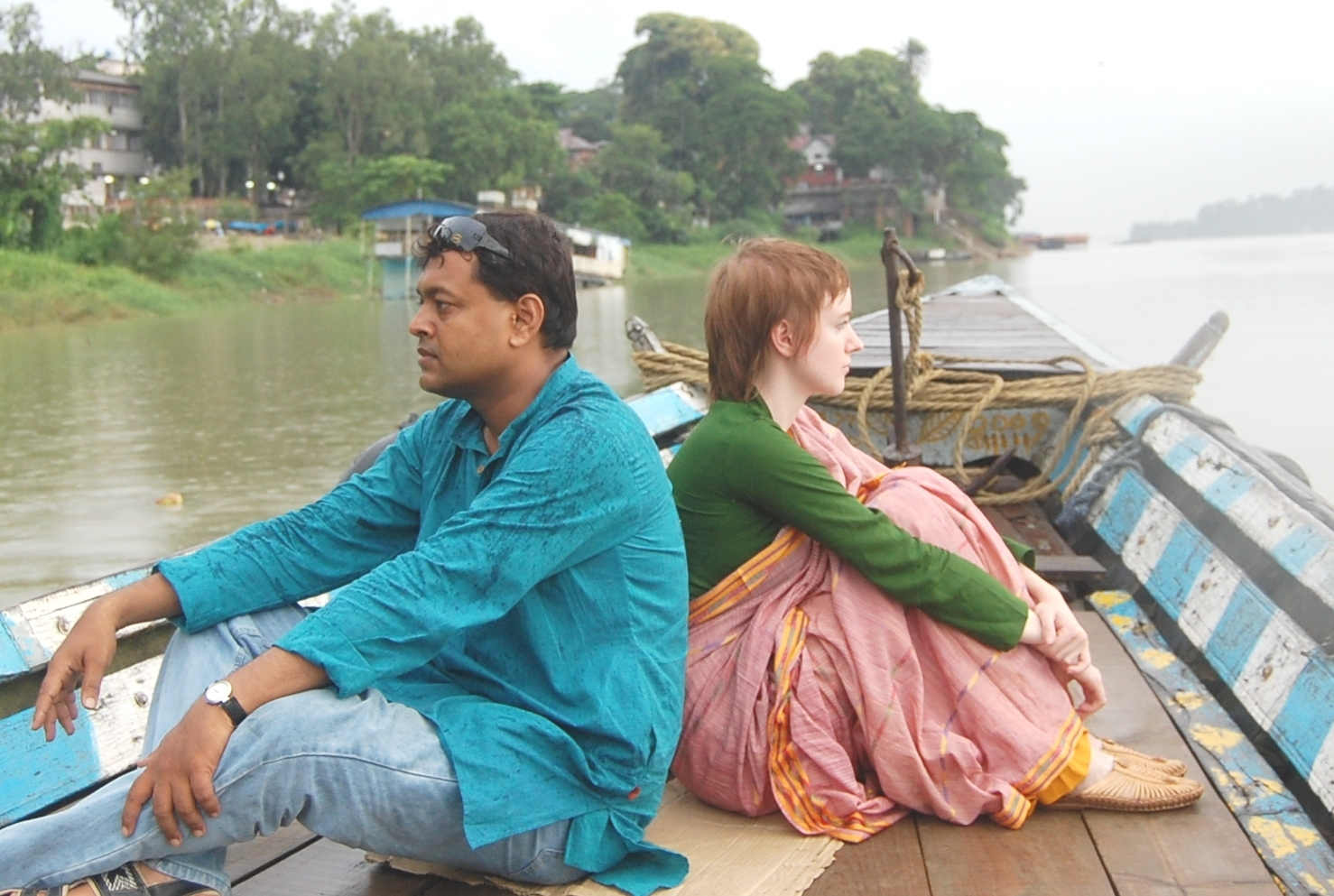
- Photo of Save Brahmaputra boatride
- Abbreviation: AFI
- Formation: 2009
- Legal status: Non-profit charity
- Purpose: Environmental conservation of the Brahmaputra River with all flora and fauna
- Location: London, Guwahati
- Region served: UK, China, India, Bangladesh, Bay of Bengal
- Members: Optional
- International Coordinator: Tess Joyce
- Main organ: Executive Council; Er. Arnab Jan Deka, International Chairman; Tess Joyce, International Coordinator
- Parent organization: Assam Foundation-India
- Website: Save the Brahmaputra River

Save the Brahmaputra River is the first joint Indo-British environmental project focusing on creating awareness about the ecological challenges faced by one of the world's mightiest rivers. This cross-continental campaign was officially launched on 31 July 2009 at Guwahati Press Club in presence of environmentalists, scholars and campaigners from both the United Kingdom and India. Within a year of its launch, the campaign received extensive international coverage and support for its proactive works in saving the river from environmental threats.

== Genesis of the Indo-British campaign ==
Popular British poet, novelist, blogger and environmentalist Tess Joyce during her visit to Brahmaputra valley in Assam for working in a techno-environmental project observed utter lack of environmental awareness and concern for the wellness of Brahmaputra river by the riverine people who settled down on both the banks of the river in the entire valley. She discussed this serious issue with famous environmental engineer, popular short-story writer, novelist, actor and poet Arnab Jan Deka and he agreed to launch the campaign Save the Brahmaputra River under the NGO headed by himself Assam Foundation-India, wherein later on Principal Bhabananda Deka Foundation joined as partner charity. They both framed the primary objectives of the campaign project, and received generous support from the general body members of the Foundation.

Agenda set out for the campaign were: (1) Creation of awareness for prevention of waste disposal and/or dumping in the River Brahmaputra; (2) Prevention of tree-felling on the banks of Brahmaputra and creation of alternative agricultural practices so as not to affect Brahmaputra in a negative way; (3) To find scientific and eco-friendly ways to prevent flood and erosion by Brahmaputra and to improve current flood taming measures for improving the living conditions of affected riverine people; (4) To raise awareness of the threats faced by declining species that live in or around the River Brahmaputra, and to find ways of ameliorating these threats; and (5) To create awareness of the potential dangers of national and international dams already constructed or awaiting constructions or planning permissions in and around Brahmaputra River, in Assam, rest of India, Tibet and China. At the formal public meet held at Guwahati Press Club on 31 July 2009 under the presidency of a top Indian environmental scientist and India's top literary award Saraswati Samman winning novelist Dr Lakshmi Nandan Bora, which was attended by many distinguished scholars, environmentalists, technocrats, actors, writers and journalists, Tess Joyce formally announced the launching of the Indo-British international campaign to save the river Brahmaputra. Arnab Jan Deka has been elected to head this campaign as its International Chairman, while Tess Joyce was elected as its International Coordinator. It was decided to establish the international office of the Indo-British campaign in London, while its registered corporate office remained in Guwahati, India. At the same meet, they also formally launched a bilingual book in English-Assamese A Stanza of Sunlight on the Banks of Brahmaputra whose entire sale proceeds will go to the said charity. Tess Joyce wrote about her experiences of launching this campaign and its resultant effect on the environment at several publications.

== Media support to the campaign ==
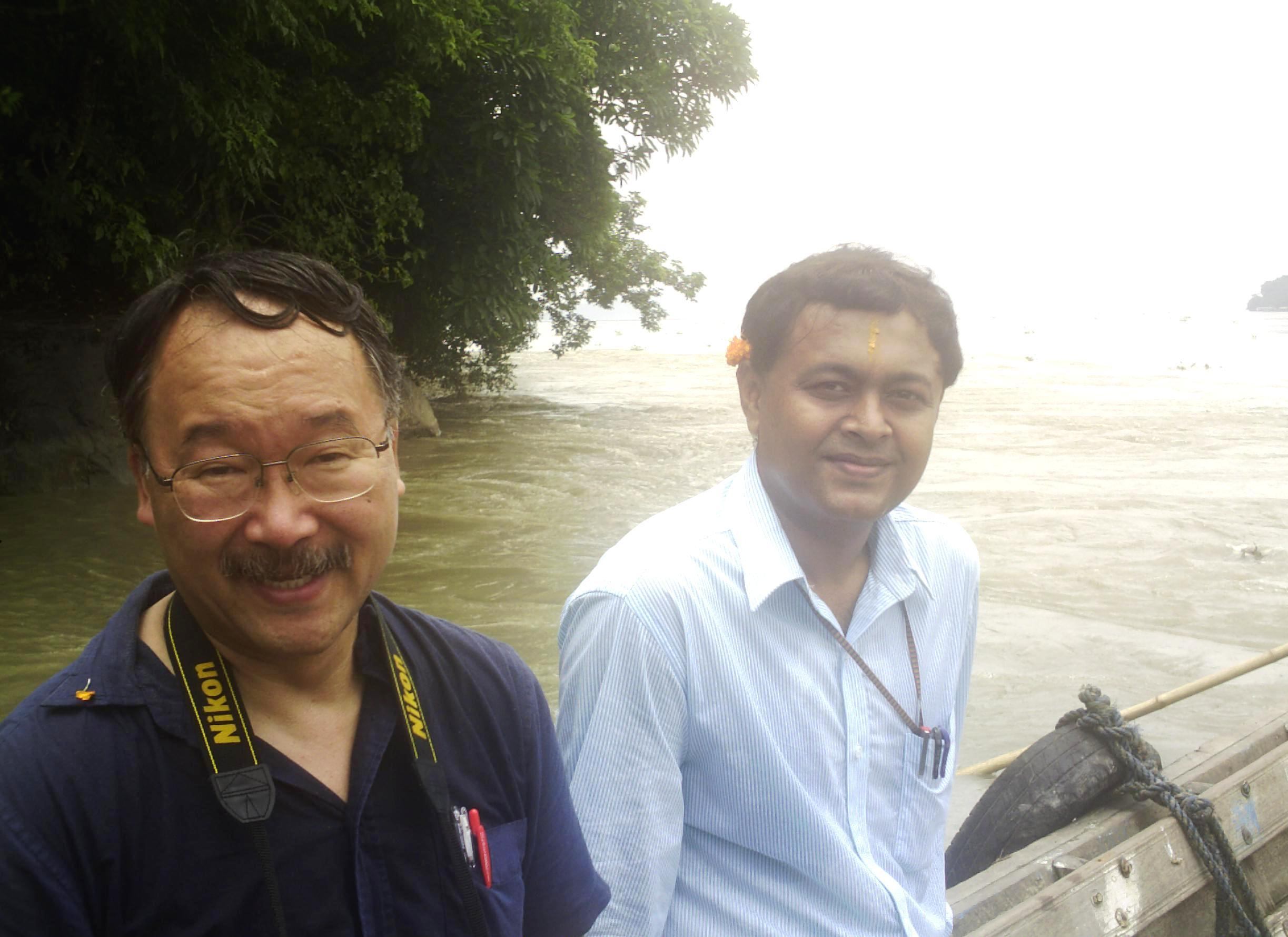
'Asahi Shimbun' journalist Yukifumi Takeuchi(Japan) & Arnab Jan Deka during Save Brahmaputra boatride (2010)

This Indo-British international campaign received wide media coverage internationally. Several leading newspapers including Asahi Shimbun, Deccan Herald, Assam Tribune, The Times of India and others published exclusive reports and by-lined articles on this unique environmental campaign. Yukifumi Takeuchi, the famous international journalist of highly circulated top Japanese daily Asahi Shimbun traveled from Tokyo to Guwahati to personally interview International Chairman of 'Save the Brahmaputra River' campaign Arnab Jan Deka and to personally observe their activities and reported back his findings in his newspaper. His landing in Brahmaputra valley in Assam created a tremendous media buzz leading to publication of a front-page headline news in the top English language daily of Northeast India The Assam Tribune. This campaign was also later on referred extensively in other write-ups on related topics.

== The campaign activities ==
This international campaign has been involved in several multinational events for attracting wider international support to the issue of environmental challenges to Brahmaputra river. Both, the International Chairman Arnab Jan Deka and International Coordinator Tess Joyce, had been highlighting at various forums the various environmental threats encountered by the mighty river. They also exposed the plan of China to divert the course of Brahmaputra river by building 9 massive Dams over it in Tibet for the very first time in Assam. They also managed to earn support of major environmentalists and groups to this cause. Various affirmative actions undertaken under this Indo-British campaign are elaborated herein below.

=== Book release on Brahmaputra by British and Assamese writers ===
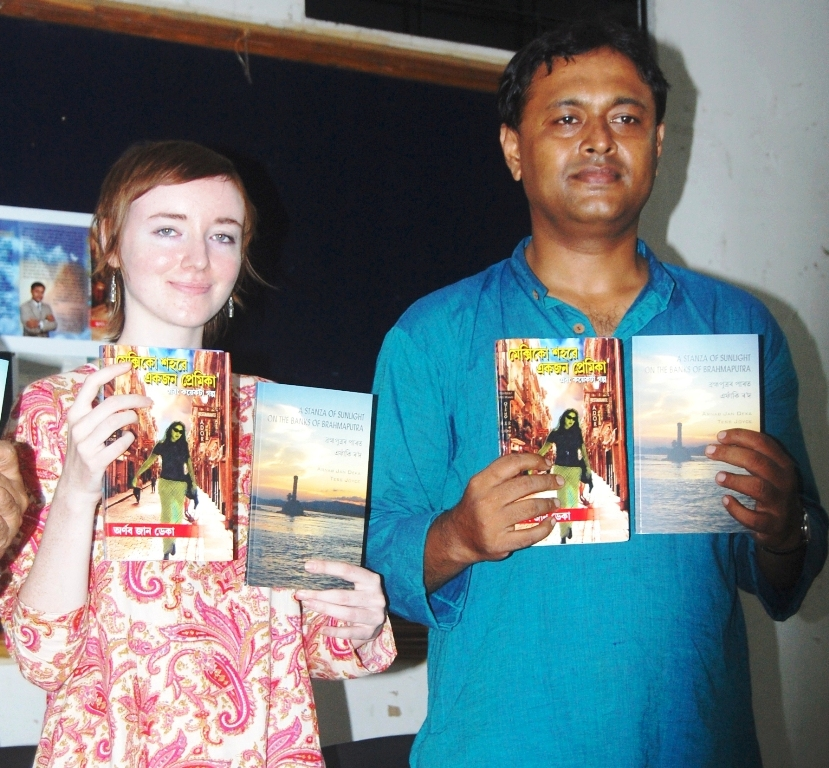
Brahmaputra book launch

A book of poetry on the aesthetics of the Brahmaputra river jointly authored by Arnab Jan Deka and Tess Joyce titled A Stanza of Sunlight on the Banks of Brahmaputra was officially launched at the inaugural programme of the campaign in Guwahati Press Club on 31 July 2009. Both the authors declared at the programme that all the author's royalty from the sale proceeds of the book shall be donated to the ‘Save the Brahmaputra River’ campaign of Assam Foundation-India. The book launch became major media event, and received extensive media coverage from leading newspapers and television channels in India like The Times of India, Deccan Herald, The Hindu, The Assam Tribune, NE TV, DY 365, Doordarshan etc. and was also highlighted in several major environmental websites.

=== At London Green Fair, Diwali Parade and book fairs ===
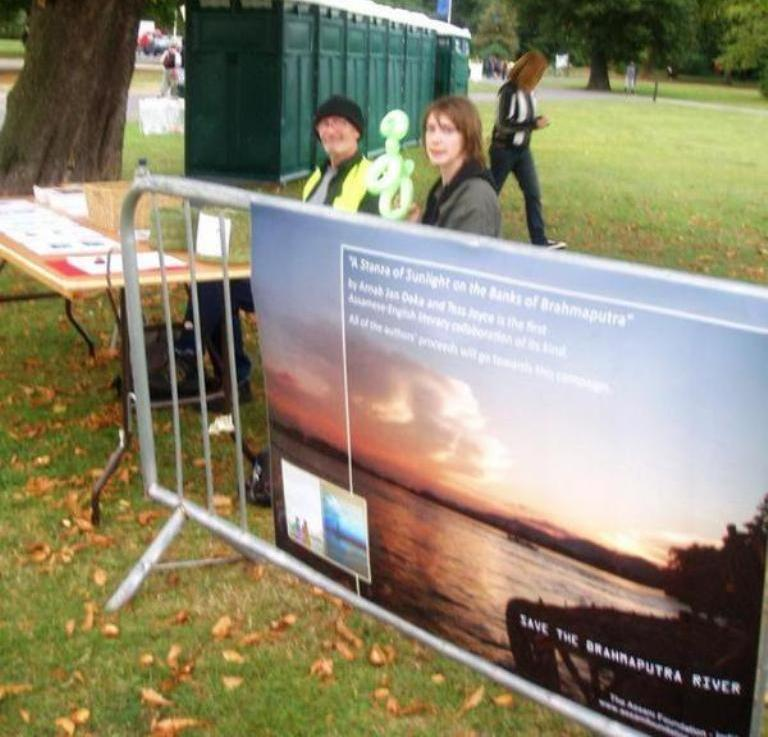
London Urban Green Fair

International Coordinator of the campaign Tess Joyce together with the UK coordinator Jenny participated at the prestigious London Urban Green Fair held in South London on 20 September 2009 along with other British Coordinators and supporters of the campaign. They set up a special desk at the Green Fair, and distributed fliers regarding the threats to the fragile eco-system of Brahmaputra River. They also sold some copies of the book A Stanza of Sunlight on the Banks of Brahmaputra to book lovers and environmental crusaders. The campaign received overwhelming response from all environmentally concerned people visiting the fair. International visitors from different corners received first-hand information and supporting materials concerning the eco-challenges of the Brahmaputra river and pledged their support to the campaign. The Urban Green Fair authorities also offered their support to the cause propagated by Assam Foundation-India, and kept the channels open for future such joint campaign, and also offered their facilities for such programmes.

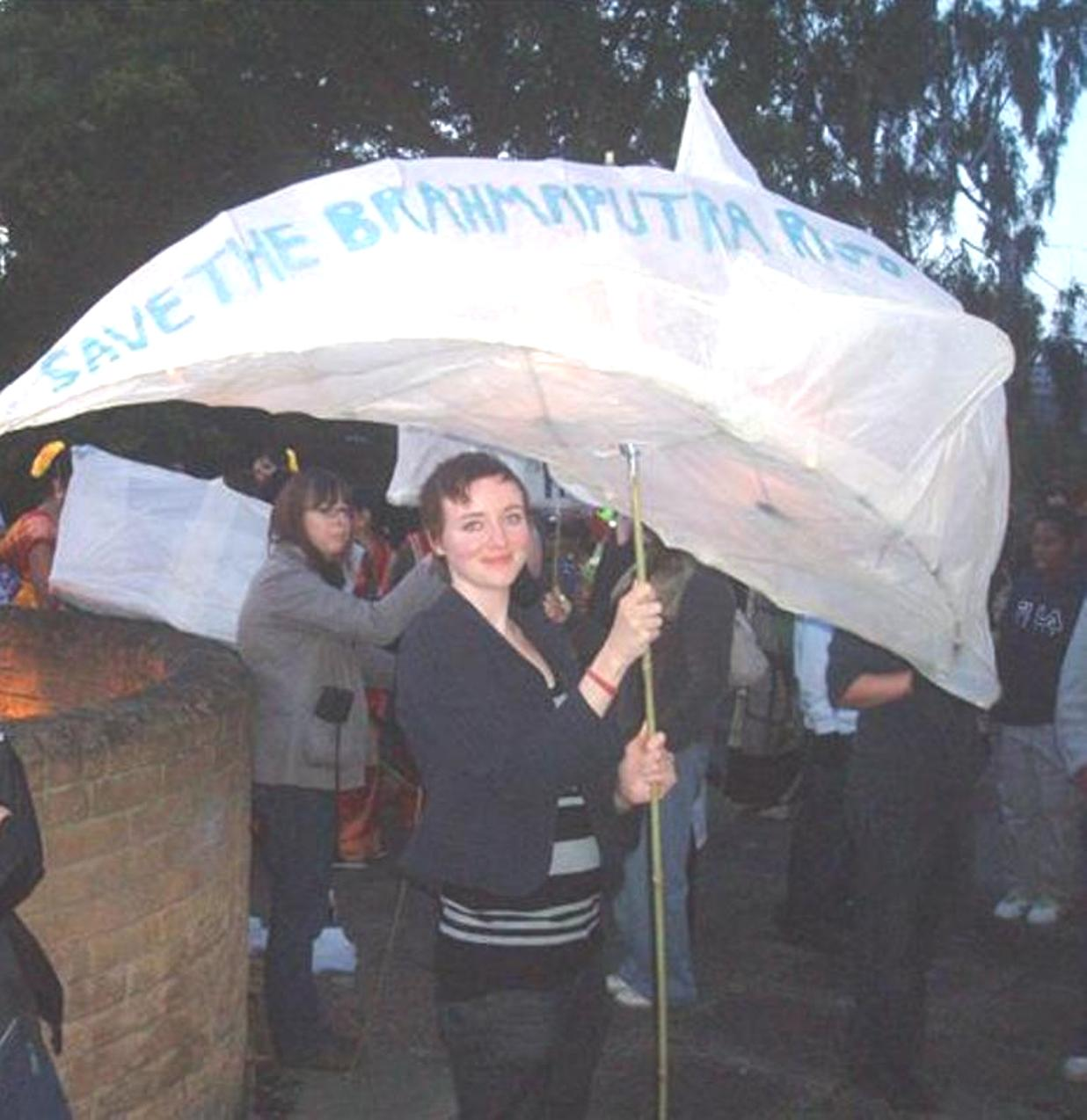
London Diwali Parade with Brahmaputra Dolphin mascot

International coordinator Tess Joyce also took part in the iconic London Diwali Parade on 23 October 2009. As part of campaign, a paper-made mascot of Brahmaputra River dolphin was built up in a workshop in London by Tess and her supporting staff. Diwali is a Hindu religious festival of light, which is celebrated all over the world including at the White House in Washington DC, and also by British Parliament. London Diwali Parade has become an eagerly waited yearly event in the festival calendar for the Londoners and other international visitors. Save the Brahmaputra River campaign had become the main highlight of the London Diwali Parade in 2009. It managed to draw attention of the co-paraders as well as other festival revelers and bystanders. Fliers and books were distributed among all those interested about the campaign regarding eco-challenges faced by Brahmaputra River.

AFI chairman and CEO of the campaign together with other members took active part in the official campaign about the environmental issues related to Brahmaputra river at the North East India Book Fair held in Guwahati during 1 to 10 December 2009. They circulated informative brochures and also managed to sell large number of the book on Brahmaputra. Since the visitors to the fair were largely educated people and enthusiastic students, there were large numbers of attentive listeners to the campaign managers of Assam Foundation-India.

AFI also participated at Assam Government-sponsored Guwahati Book Fair held at Maniram Dewan International Trade Centre, held from 4 to 10 April 2010. Its stall in the Fair managed to draw huge crowds, and many books on Brahmaputra and other issues promoted by the Foundation sold out. Assam Government extended generous support to the campaign in setting up its stall within the permanent pavilion at the International Trade Centre by waiving all the expenses related to it. All logistical support was offered free of cost by the Assam Government officials. The fair was inaugurated by Chief Minister of Assam in presence of many celebrities and prominent litterateurs and opinion makers. and they positively responded to the Save the Brahmaputra River campaign launched by Assam Foundation-India.

=== At international conferences, symposium and workshops ===
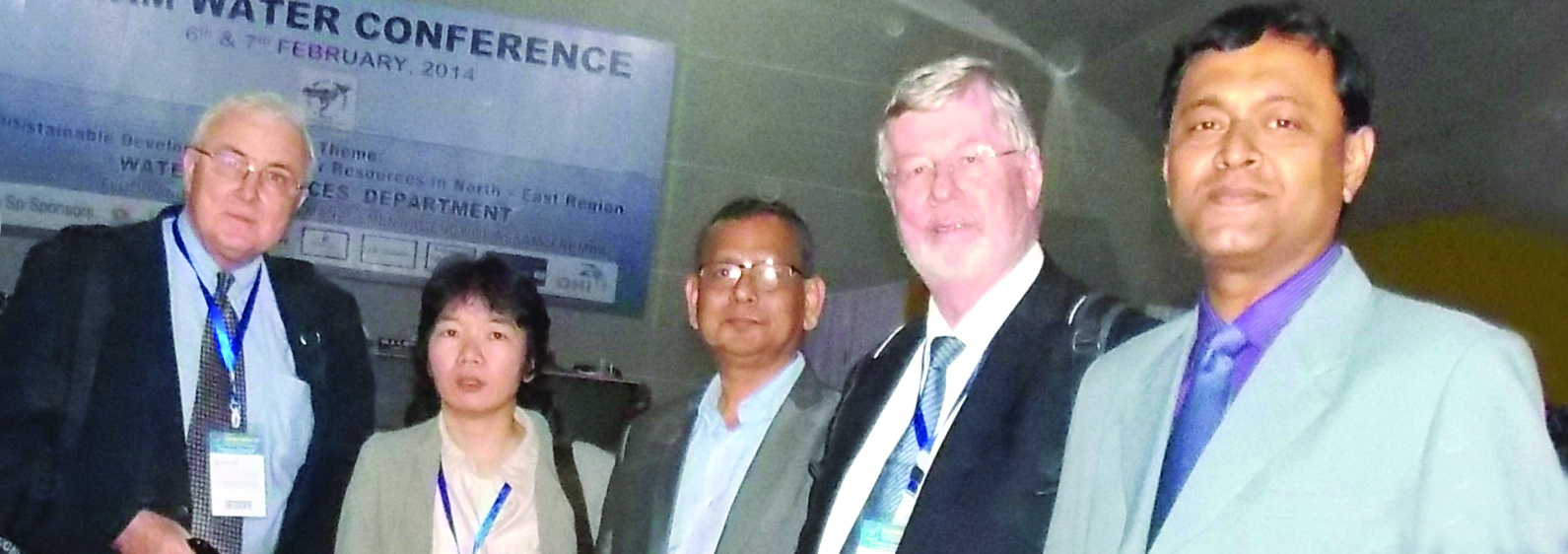
Er. Arnab Jan Deka with Dr Constantin Stere(Netherlands), Natsuko Totsuka(ADB, Japan) & Gerrit Klaassen(Netherlands)

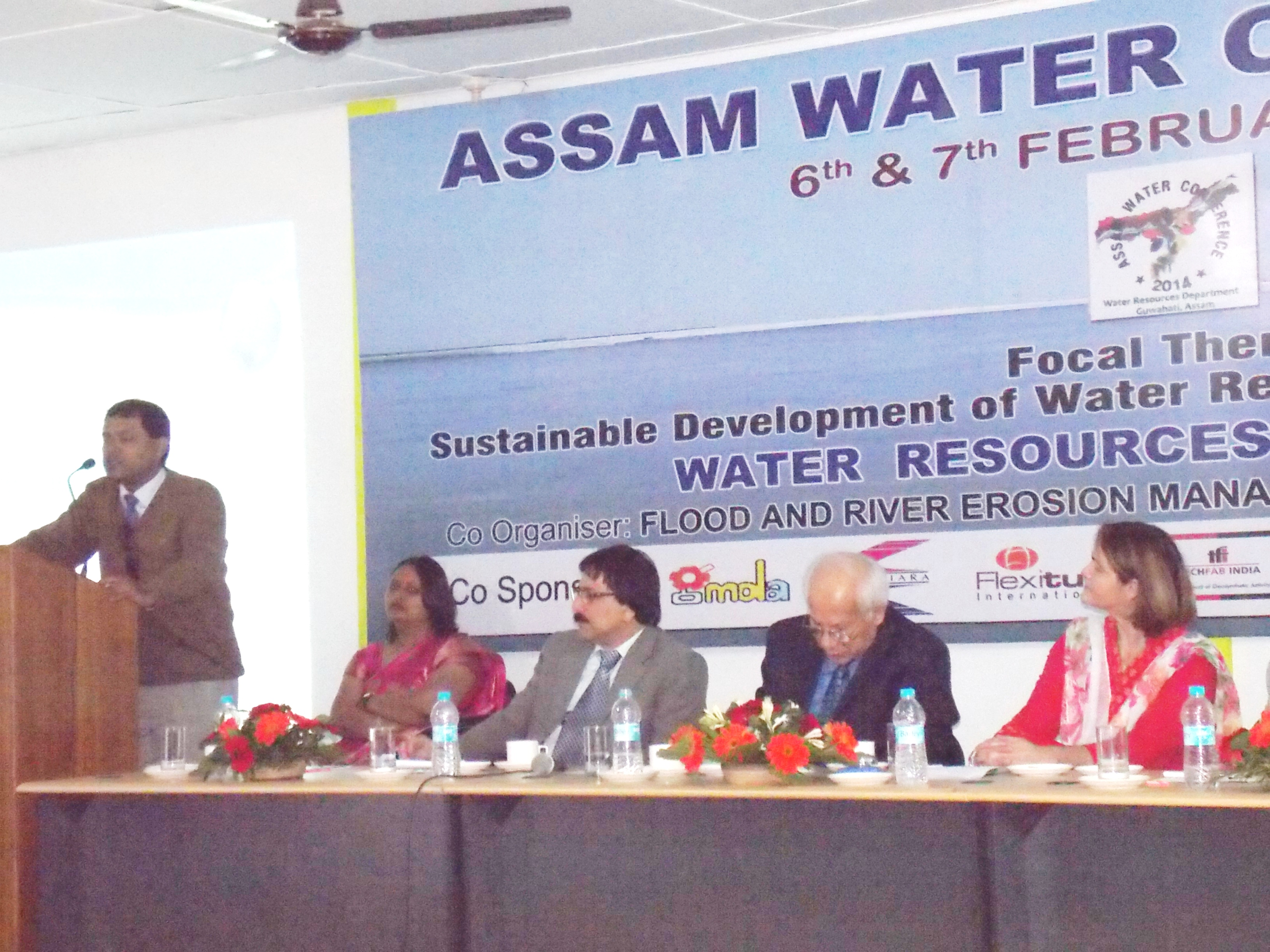
Er. Arnab Jan Deka delivering lecture at International Water Conference with foreign delegates (2014)

The chairman and CEO of the campaign received invites and took active part at several international water conferences and symposium held in 2013, 2014 and 2015, where various issues related to Brahmaputra river had been deliberated by world's leading river scientists and technocrats from Germany, the Netherlands, Denmark, Canada, the United States, Australia, Japan, Bangladesh, Sri Lanka, South Korea, Thailand, the United Kingdom, India and Nepal. These river experts, besides the representatives of World Bank, Unicef and Asian Development Bank, also personally interacted with the chairman and CEO of the Indo-British Campaign. Invitations had been extended to the chairman by several universities and other organisations from different countries for sustained future collaborations in research and exchange of information and training at multi-national level.

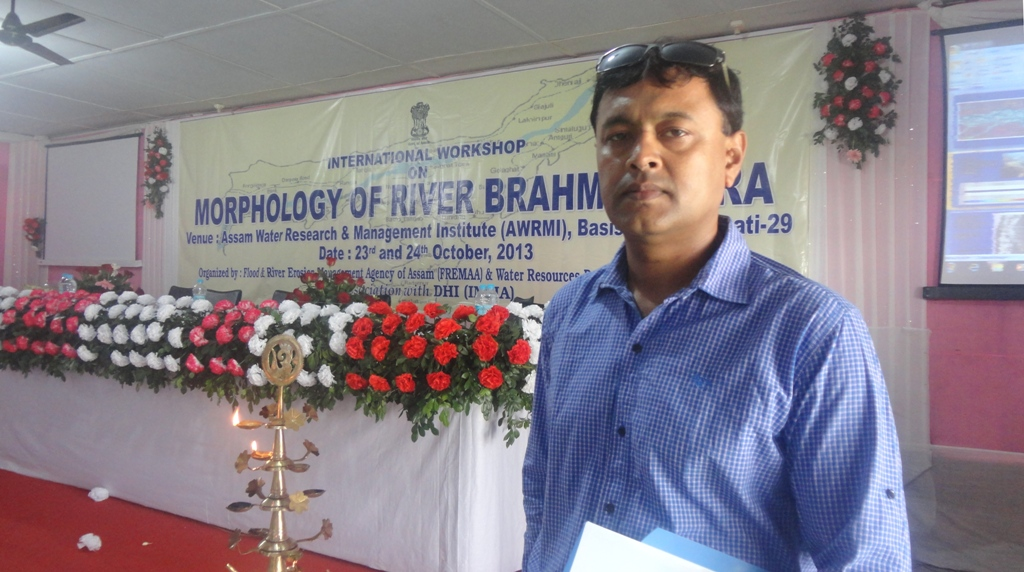
Er. Arnab Jan Deka at International Workshop on Brahmaputra Morphology (2013)

World Bank sponsored an International Workshop on Brahmaputra Morphology in Guwahati in November, 2013, wherein the chairman and CEO of the Indo-British campaign participated as an invited delegate, and exchanged knowledge with international experts and other specialists relating to behavioural pattern of the mighty river and also discussed about various scientific and engineering techniques to be adopted for mitigating flood and erosion related devastation causes by the river. Some workable benchmarks had been achieved at this international workshop, on which World Bank is currently supporting an ambitious independent project in collaboration with stake-holding states.

== Book launch and endowment lecture on Brahmaputra ==
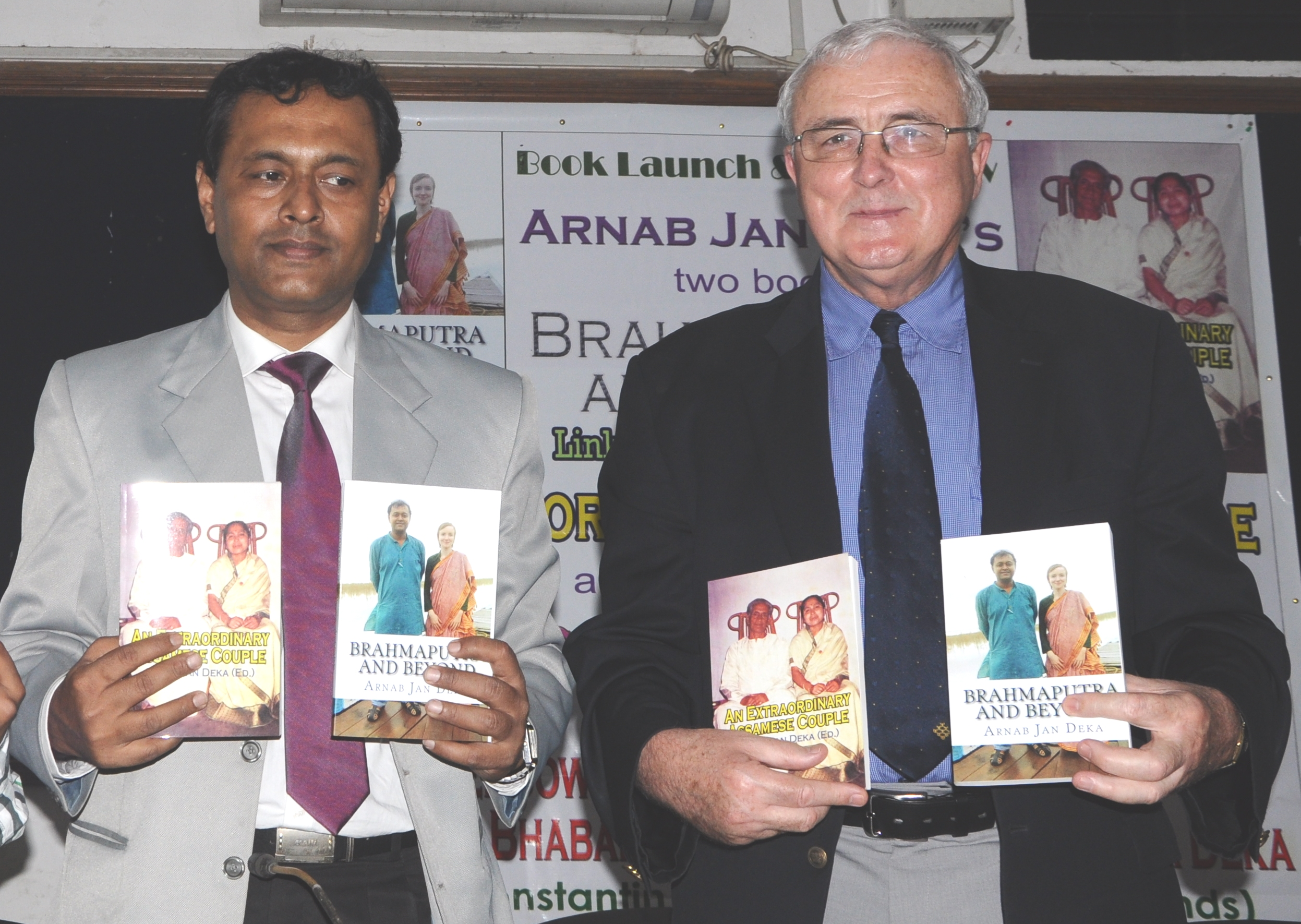
Dr Constantin Stere launches Arnab Jan Deka's two English Books (28 Feb 2015)

Famous river scientist and hydraulics expert Dr Constantin Aurel Stere traveled from the Netherlands to India to officially launch a book Brahmaputra and Beyond authored by International Chairman of 'Save the Brahmaputra River' campaign Arnab Jan Deka, which was published by Assam Foundation-India together with Universal Books, and also to deliver the first 'Principal Bhabananda Deka & Nalini Prava Deka Endowment Lecture'. Dr Stere, who was a professor of hydraulics engineering in Technical University of Civil Engineering in Romania and University of West Indies, Barbados, and the International Team Leader in various projects of UNESCO, EUROPEAN COMMISSION, World Bank, Asian Development Bank and Spanish-Dutch-British Consortium relating to river and coastal engineering in more than 30 countries, attended both the programmes held together at Guwahati Press Club on 28 February 2015, in presence of the author and many other distinguished scholars and media. News reports published subsequently in different media stated that Dr Stere "spoke highly about the extraordinary talent and vision of writer and engineer Arnab Jan Deka in carrying forward the technology and art together in sublime linking essence of Brahmaputra and projecting it to an interested world."

== Outcome of the campaign ==
In a write-up published in 'The Assam Tribune', it is stated that the Save the Brahmaputra River campaign-related "collaborations have initiated many newly developed technologies and methodologies in the sphere of Brahmaputra research, like predicting and testing flood and erosion through various mathematical models and simulations, as well as ecological problems like global warming, greenhouse effect, garbage dumping and other burning issues." Some other writings also individually praised the efforts of the leading campaigners linked to this Indo-British campaign. In such a write-up, the International Chairman's individual works have been summed up stating that he "delved deep into the spiritual and intellectual heritage along the Brahmaputra valley, and also highlighted its environmental fragility."
