= Lundgaard =

Lundgaard is a Danish surname. Notable people with the surname include:

- Ben Lundgaard (born 1995), American soccer player
- Christian Lundgaard (born 2001), Danish racing driver
- Daniel Lundgaard (born 2000), Danish badminton player
- Hans Petter Lundgaard (1935–2026), Norwegian jurist
- Henrik Lundgaard (born 1969), Danish rally driver
- Jens Lundgaard (1911–1997), Danish footballer
- Jesper Lundgaard (born 1954), Danish jazz bassist and composer
- Sara Lundgaard (born 1997), Danish badminton player
- Sofie Lundgaard (born 2002), Danish football player
