= Kojiro Tamba =

Japanese wrestler

Personal information
- Nationality: Japanese
- Born: 10 May 1912

Sport
- Sport: Wrestling

Kojiro Tamba (丹波 幸次郎, Tanba Kojirō; born 10 May 1912, date of death unknown) was a Japanese wrestler. He competed in the men's freestyle bantamweight at the 1936 Summer Olympics.
