= Ahmet Çakıryıldız =

Turkish wrestler

Personal information
- Nationality: Turkish
- Born: 20 November 1911

Sport
- Sport: Wrestling

Ahmet Çakıryıldız (born 20 November 1911, date of death unknown) was a Turkish wrestler. He competed in the men's freestyle bantamweight at the 1936 Summer Olympics.
