= Julien Depuychaffray =

French wrestler

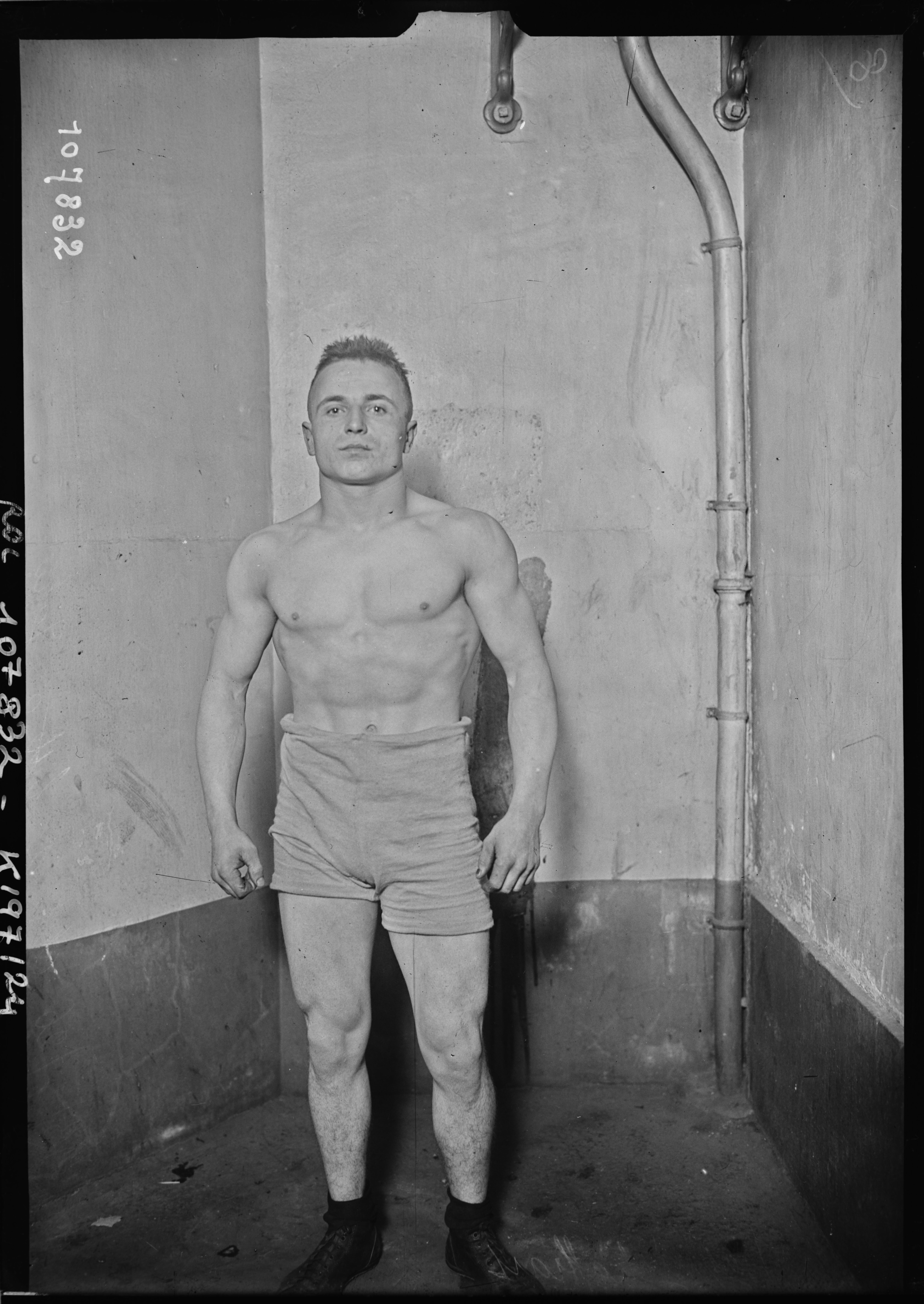
- Depuychaffray in 1926

Personal information
- Nationality: French
- Born: 6 March 1907 Bougival, France
- Died: 8 October 1942 (aged 35)

Sport
- Sport: Wrestling

Julien Depuychaffray (6 March 1907 – 8 October 1942) was a French wrestler. He competed in the men's freestyle bantamweight at the 1932 Summer Olympics.
