= László Szekfű =

Hungarian wrestler

Personal information
- Nationality: Hungarian
- Born: 16 November 1905 Somogy, Austria-Hungary
- Died: 17 December 1977 (aged 72) Kaposvár, Hungary

Sport
- Sport: Wrestling

László Szekfű (16 November 1905 – 17 December 1977) was a Hungarian wrestler. He competed in the men's Greco-Roman bantamweight at the 1932 Summer Olympics.
