= Shankarrao Thorat =

Indian wrestler

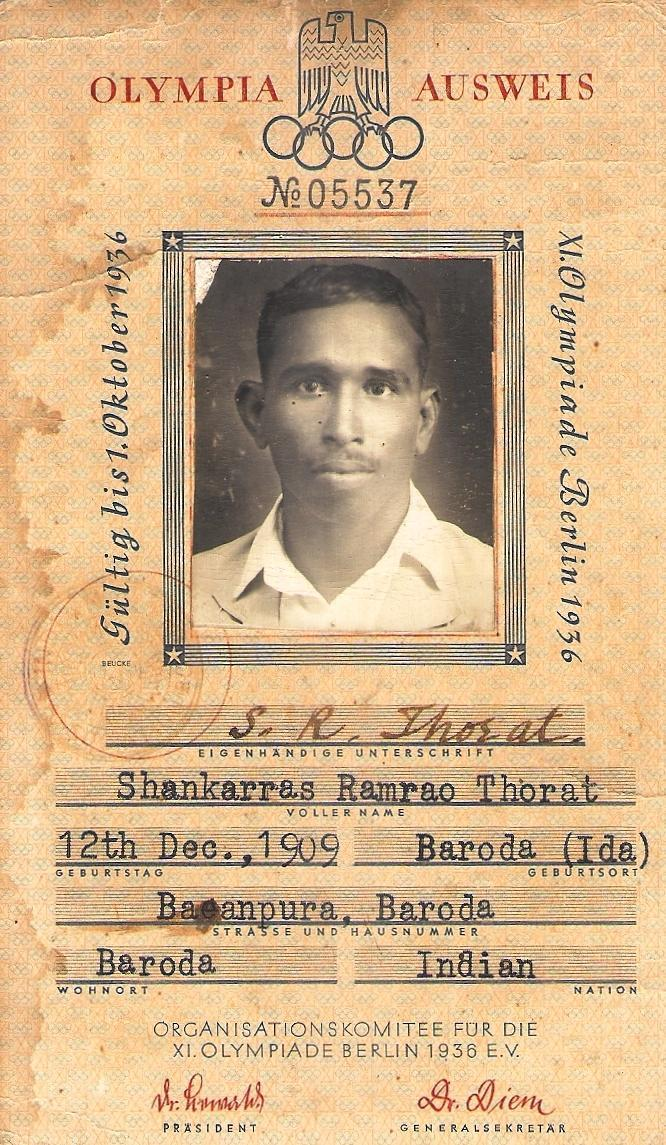

Personal information
- Nationality: Indian
- Born: 12 December 1909
- Died: September 1983

Sport
- Sport: Wrestling

Shankarrao Thorat (12 December 1909 – September 1983) was an Indian wrestler. He competed in the men's freestyle bantamweight at the 1936 Summer Olympics.
