= Yaruingam =

Sahitya Akademi Award winning Book

- File:Yaruingam.jpg Yaruingam book cover
- Author: Birendra Kumar Bhattacharya
- Working title: Iyaruingam
- Language: Assamese
- Subject: Manipur and Nagaland
- Genre: Political Science fiction
- Published: 1960
- Publication place: India
- Media type: Print
- Pages: 338
- Awards: Sahitya Akademi Award

Yaruingam (also known as Iyaruingam) is an Assamese language fiction novel written by Birendra Kumar Bhattacharya in 1960. The book won the second highest Indian literary award Sahitya Akademi in 1961.

== Premise ==
Set in pre-independent India, in Manipur and Naga hills, Rishang (the protagonist and follower of Gandhian ideals) fights for democratic people's rule (Yaruingam), while Phanitphang (a Naga nationalist) starts a radical struggle for complete independence of Nagaland. The story of the novel ends with unresolved and complex political conditions of the region.

== Reception ==
Manjeet Baruah in Economic & Political Weekly wrote "Nevertheless, a text like Yaruingam is still relevant, especially given the transformative moment that Assam, or North East India, presently inhabits. Though thematised on the Naga movement, the novel is as much about an Assamese literary imagination of the “people’s rule.”" Lemyao Shimray for LiveJournal wrote "Through the land dispute the author narrated about different ideologies the public had, about Christianity. No doubt, Christianity brought the Nagas’ education and development but if we look back at the history of education and Christianity in Naga areas, it was misinterpreted and imposed on Nagas as westernised." U A Shimray for The Morung Express observed "This is one of the first kinds of novel on Nagas, which is well researched, with good observation and meaningfully written of the times."

== Awards ==
- Sahitya Akademi Award in 1961.

== Translations ==
The book was translated to English with the name "Love in the Time of Insurgency". Muzaffar Aazim translated the book to Kashmiri language.
