= Jack Lyons (footballer, born 1912) =

Australian rules footballer, born 1912

Personal information
- Full name: Jack Lyons
- Born: 4 April 1912
- Died: 9 April 1988 (aged 76)
- Original team: Queenscliff
- Height: 180 cm (5 ft 11 in)
- Weight: 81 kg (179 lb)

Playing career^{1}
Years	Club	Games (Goals)
1934	Geelong	3 (1)
- ^{1} Playing statistics correct to the end of 1934.

Jack Lyons (4 April 1912 – 9 April 1988) was an Australian rules footballer who played with Geelong in the Victorian Football League (VFL).
