= Bill Montgomery (Australian footballer) =

Australian rules footballer (1915–1988)

Personal information
- Full name: Bill Montgomery
- Born: 22 March 1915
- Died: 12 April 1988 (aged 73)
- Original team: South Kensington
- Height: 177 cm (5 ft 10 in)
- Weight: 75 kg (165 lb)
- Position: Half back flank

Playing career^{1}
Years	Club	Games (Goals)
1936–42	North Melbourne	61 (3)
- ^{1} Playing statistics correct to the end of 1942.

Bill Montgomery (22 March 1915 – 12 April 1988) was an Australian rules footballer who played with North Melbourne in the Victorian Football League (VFL).
