= Cesar Gaudard =

Swiss wrestler

Personal information
- Nationality: Swiss
- Born: 21 January 1915

Sport
- Sport: Wrestling

Cesar Gaudard (21 January 1915 – 28 August 1997) was a Swiss wrestler. He competed in the men's freestyle bantamweight at the 1936 Summer Olympics.
