= Gustave Laporte =

Belgian wrestler

Personal information
- Nationality: Belgian
- Born: 17 February 1909

Sport
- Sport: Wrestling

Gustave Laporte (17 February 1909 – 8 April 1988) was a Belgian wrestler. He competed in the men's freestyle bantamweight at the 1936 Summer Olympics.
