= Jim Morris (rugby league) =

Australian rugby league footballer

Personal information
- Full name: James Albert Morris
- Born: 29 March 1895; Leichhardt, New South Wales, Australia
- Died: 9 April 1988 (aged 93); Arncliffe, New South Wales, Australia

Playing information
- Position: Prop, Second-row
Club
Years	Team	Pld	T	G	FG	P
1921–26	St. George	35	2	0	0	6

Jim Morris (1895-1988) was an Australian rugby league footballer who played in the 1920s.

== Playing career ==
Morris was a pioneer player at St George, who started in their very first season in Reserve Grade in 1921. He played First Grade the following year and continued playing grade with them until 1928 and spent many years in behind the scenes roles at the club after he retired. Morris was almost the last foundation year player still alive in 1988 besides Reg Fusedale and Ernie Lapham.

== Death ==
Morris died on 9 April 1988, age 93.
