= Bill MacIntosh =

Canadian sailor (1930–1997)

William Maitland Macintosh (3 September 1930 – 22 August 1997) was a Canadian sailor who competed in the 1952 Summer Olympics. Macintosh was born in Toronto, Ontario on 3 September 1930, and died in Muskoka, Ontario on 22 August 1997, at the age of 66.
