= Paul Buckley =

Australian rules footballer, born 1913

Personal information
- Full name: Paul Buckley
- Born: 13 May 1913
- Died: 26 April 1988 (aged 74)
- Original team: Fish Creek

Playing career^{1}
Years	Club	Games (Goals)
1938	Essendon	2 (0)
- ^{1} Playing statistics correct to the end of 1938.

Paul Buckley (13 May 1913 – 26 April 1988) was an Australian rules footballer who played with Essendon in the Victorian Football League (VFL).
