= Jakob Brendel =

German wrestler (1907–1964)

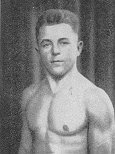

Personal information
- Born: September 18, 1907 Speyer, German Empire
- Died: February 2, 1964 (aged 56) Nuremberg, West Germany
Medal record
Men's Greco-Roman wrestling
Representing Germany
Olympic Games
Gold medal – first place	1932 Los Angeles	Bantamweight
Bronze medal – third place	1936 Berlin	Bantamweight

Jakob Brendel (18 September 1907 – 2 February 1964) was a German wrestler and Olympic champion in Greco-Roman wrestling.

== Olympics ==
Brendel competed at the 1932 Summer Olympics in Los Angeles where he received a gold medal in Greco-Roman wrestling, the bantamweight class.
