= Francesco Pacini =

Italian modern pentathlete (1905–1988)

Personal information
- Born: 7 October 1905 Fermo, Italy
- Died: 11 April 1988 (aged 82)

Sport
- Sport: Modern pentathlon

Francesco Pacini (7 October 1905 – 11 April 1988) was an Italian modern pentathlete. He competed at the 1932 Summer Olympics.
