= Eddie Regan =

Australian rules footballer, born 1909

Personal information
- Full name: Edward William Ephraim Regan
- Born: 11 September 1909; Allendale, Victoria
- Died: 2 April 1988 (aged 78); Dandenong, Victoria
- Original team: Elsternwick
- Height: 177 cm (5 ft 10 in)
- Weight: 86 kg (190 lb)

Playing career^{1}
Years	Club	Games (Goals)
1931	Essendon	1 (0)
- ^{1} Playing statistics correct to the end of 1931.

Edward William Ephraim Regan (11 September 1909 – 2 April 1988) was an Australian rules footballer who played with Essendon in the Victorian Football League (VFL).

Regan later served in the Australian Army during World War II.
