= Safi Darashah =

Indian cricketer (1902–1988)

Personal information
- Full name: Safi Darashah
- Born: 1902
- Died: 1988 (aged 85–86)
- Batting: Right-handed
- Bowling: Right-arm medium; Right-arm off-spin

Career statistics
Competition	First-class
Matches	24
Runs scored	504
Batting average	12.92
100s/50s	0/0
Top score	54
Balls bowled
Wickets	64
Bowling average	23.54
5 wickets in innings	1
10 wickets in match	0
Best bowling	5/44
Catches/stumpings	19/–
- Source: ESPNCricInfo, 20 May 2021

Safi Darashah (1902 – 2 April 1988) was an Indian cricketer who played 24 first class matches.
