= Len Norris =

Canadian cartoonist (1913–1997)

- Born: Leonard Matheson Norris; December 1, 1913 London, England
- Died: August 12, 1997 aged 83 Langley, British Columbia, Canada
- Area: Cartoonist

Leonard Matheson Norris (December 1, 1913 – August 12, 1997) was an editorial cartoonist for the Canadian newspaper Vancouver Sun from 1950 to 1988. Called "the best in the business" by Walt Kelly, the creator of Pogo, Norris skewered the foibles of British Columbia politics and social mores. His drawings were full of extraneous but intriguing detail, with more going on in them besides the main action, from sardonic pictures on the living room wall to children or animals acting up in corners, and the captions contained wry monologues. Norris's cartoons remain popular today even though much of their original political or social context is gone.

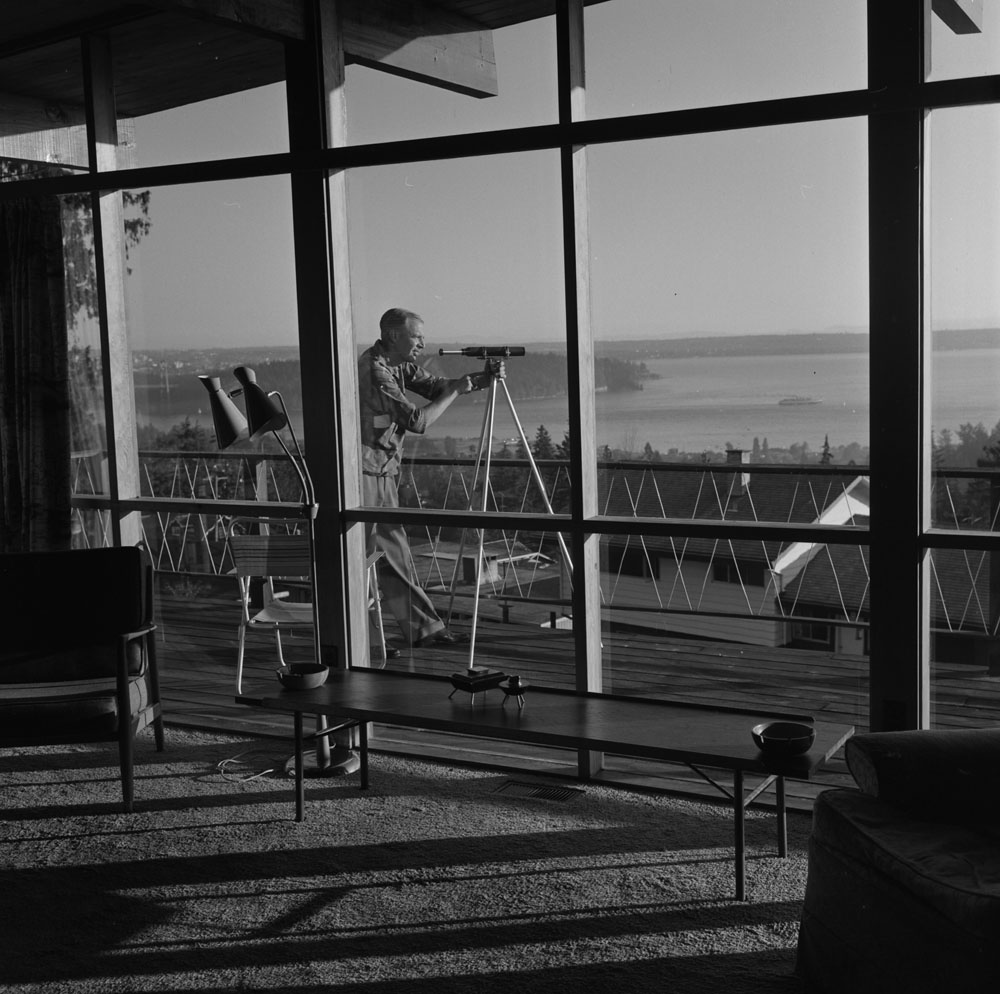
Cartoonist Len Norris looking through a telescope at his home in North Vancouver, British Columbia in 1958.

Recurring themes and characters in Norris cartoons included the setting of Amblesnide and Tiddlycove, a play on the tweedy West Vancouver neighbourhoods of Ambleside and Dundarave; Rodney, a caricature of an Anglo-centric monarchical Canadian; the "Socred cow" for the British Columbia government's liquor stores; and lampoons of the Pacific Great Eastern Railway.

One of his cartoons has been reproduced as a 15-foot mural in the resurrected Celebrity Club at PAL Place in Toronto. It shows a mythical day in the famed Studio G at CBC Radio on Jarvis Street sometime in the early 1960s, with caricatures of some of the luminaries of the great days of radio.

Norris received an honorary doctorate from the University of Windsor. In the 1960s one of his famous Brockton Oval cricket cartoons was re-produced on a limited edition T-shirt for participants in the University of Windsor's Senior Seminar. A small collection of his sketches and finished cartoons are held by a collector of political cartoons in the Windsor, Ontario, region.
