= Birendra Kumar Bhattacharya =

Indian writer (1924–1997)

- Born: 14 October 1924; Assam Province, British India (now Assam, India)
- Died: 6 August 1997 (aged 72); Guwahati, Assam, India
- Occupations: Writer; educator; journalist
- Spouse: Binita Bhattacharya
- Children: 3
- Writing career
- Language: Assamese
- Notable works: Mrityunjay; Iyaruingam; Aai
- Notable awards: Jnanpith Award (1979); Sahitya Akademi Award (1960)

Birendra Kumar Bhattacharya (14 October 1924 – 6 August 1997) was an Indian writer. He was also a recipient of Sahitya Akademi Award in Assamese in 1961 for his Assamese novel Iyaruingam, which is considered a masterpiece of Indian literature. He was one of the pioneers of modern Assamese literature. An interview of him conducted by India Today in 1980, was archived by the publication in 2014, 17 years after his death.

He was the first ever Assamese writer to receive the Jnanpith Award, which was awarded to him in the year 1979 for his novel Mrityunjay (Immortal), followed by Indira Goswami in 2001. In 2005, a translation of the work published by Katha Books with the title Love in the Time of Insurgency was released. Another famous novel written by Bhattacharya is Aai (Mother).

He was the President of Asam Sahitya Sabha (Assam Literary Society) during 1983–1985. In 1997, Bhattacharyya died due to a brief illness at the private college hospital in Guwahati.

== Editor of 'Ramdhenu' ==
Bhattacharya was a respected figure in the Assamese modern literary sphere for his role in discovering, nurturing and promoting young literary talent in Assam from 1960s as the editor of the Assamese literary journal Ramdhenu. His role as the editor of this journal was so prominent that the period of its publication in the mid-20th century in Assam is referred as Ramdhenu Era of Assamese literature and considered as a golden era.

His major discoveries of Ramdhenu Era are deemed to be the top Assamese and Indian litterateurs of the second half of the 20th century. His most prominent literary discoveries during the Ramdhenu Era who left undeniable mark in different domains of Assamese literature during the next half century are Lakshmi Nandan Bora, Bhabendra Nath Saikia, Saurav Kumar Chaliha, Navakanta Barua, Bhabananda Deka, Nirmal Prabha Bordoloi, Padma Barkataki, Homen Borgohain, Hiren Bhattacharya, Chandraprasad Saikia, Nilmoni Phukan Sr, Hiren Gohain, Mamoni Raisom Goswami and several others. Even after Ramdhenu stopped publication, he remained active as the leading Indian literary critic, and continued his mission of discovering extraordinary literary talent in Assam.

Until the mid-1980s, he continued to write literary criticism and reviews of younger authors whose works he believed showed significant promise and the potential to become influential in later decades. One of his final literary discoveries was Arnab Jan Deka, then a school student, whose first published book, A Stanza of Sunlight on the Banks of Brahmaputra (Brahmaputrar Parot Ephanki Rhode - In Assamese), appeared in 1983 while he was in the 10th standard. Dr. Bhattacharya wrote a critical essay on the work, published in the literary journal Gandhaar in 1987.

Throughout his career, Dr. Bhattacharya earned a distinguished reputation in Indian literary circles during his lifetime, playing a role in fostering the development of emerging writers. He was particularly noted for identifying and promoting promising literary talent.

== Works ==
=== Novels ===
- Dhanpur Lashkar (1986)
- Rajpathe Ringiay (1957)
- Aai (1958)
- Iyaruingam (1960) – Sahitya Akademi Award winning novel
- Sataghni (1964)
- Mrityunjay (1979) – Jnanpith award winning novel
- Pratipaad
- Ranga Megh
- Billari
- Daaini
- Love in the Time of Insurgency
- Blossoms in the Graveyard

=== Other works ===
- Kolong Aajiu Boi (1962) – collection of short stories
- Satsori (1963) – collection of short stories
- published some poems in the magazine Jayanthi.

== See also ==
- List of Indian writers
