= Johannes Herbert =

German wrestler (1912–1978)

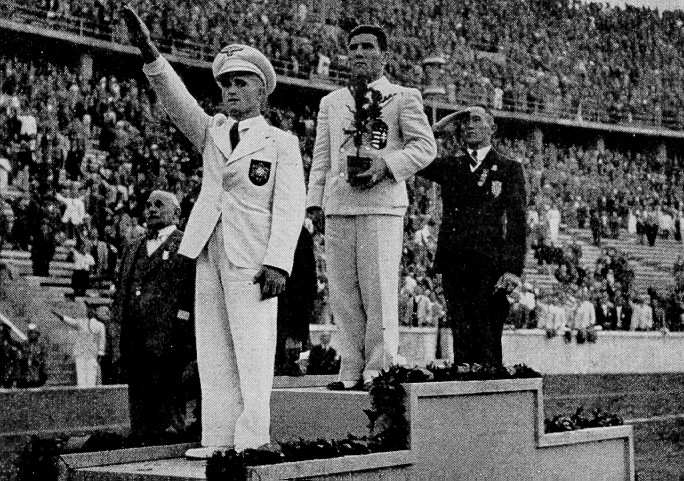
- Herbert (far left on podium) at 1936 Olympics

Medal record

Men's freestyle wrestling

Representing Germany

Olympic Games
Bronze medal – third place	1936 Berlin	bantamweight

Johannes Herbert (28 October 1912 – 30 December 1978) was a German wrestler who competed in the 1936 Summer Olympics.
