= Steve Pruski =

Canadian football player

Profile
- Position: Guard

Personal information
- Born: c. 1924; St. Catharines, Ontario, Canada
- Died: August 15, 1997 (aged 73); Hamilton, Ontario, Canada
- Listed weight: 195 lb (88 kg)

Career history
- 1945–1948: Toronto Argonauts

Awards and highlights
- Grey Cup champion (1945, 1946, 1947)

Steve Pruski (c. 1924 – August 15, 1997) was a Canadian professional football player who played for the Toronto Argonauts. He won the Grey Cup with them in 1945, 1946 and 1947.
