= Alf Hansen (footballer) =

Norwegian footballer (1899–1988)

Personal information
- Date of birth: 25 August 1899
- Date of death: 26 April 1988 (aged 88)

International career
Years	Team	Apps	(Gls)
1926	Norway	1	(0)

Alf Hansen (25 August 1899 – 26 April 1988) was a Norwegian footballer. He played in one match for the Norway national football team in 1926.
