= Bror Vingren =

Swedish wrestler

Personal information
- Nationality: Swedish
- Born: 20 March 1906 Staffanstorp, Sweden
- Died: 14 September 1980 (aged 74) Malmö, Sweden

Sport
- Sport: Wrestling

Bror Vingren (20 March 1906 – 14 September 1980) was a Swedish wrestler. He competed in the men's freestyle bantamweight at the 1932 Summer Olympics.
