= John Baker (Australian footballer) =

Australian rules footballer, born 1918

Personal information
- Full name: John Baker
- Born: 2 March 1918
- Died: 2 April 1988 (aged 70)
- Height: 158 cm (5 ft 2 in)
- Weight: 59 kg (130 lb)

Playing career^{1}
Years	Club	Games (Goals)
1938–40	North Melbourne	28 (4)
- ^{1} Playing statistics correct to the end of 1940.

John Baker (2 March 1918 – 2 April 1988) was an Australian rules footballer who played with North Melbourne in the Victorian Football League (VFL).
