= Richard R. Day =

American academic

Richard R. Day is an American academic who is a professor of English as a second or foreign language (ESL) and Second language acquisition (SLA), at the University of Hawaiʻi. He has a Ph.D. from the University of Hawaiʻi, a Master of Arts degree for TEFL from Southern Illinois University, and a Bachelor of Arts degree from Brown University. Day's book Extensive Reading Activities for Teaching Language, co-edited with Julian Bamford, was published by Cambridge University Press. He has given numerous talks and workshops at conferences around the world. He has been a visiting professor at Hanoi University of Foreign Studies, Ha Noi, Vietnam, and Assumption University, Bangkok, Thailand.

Day was awarded the Milne Award for Significant Achievements in the Field of Extensive Reading at the Second World Congress on Extensive Reading at Yonsei University, Seoul, Republic of Korea on 14 September 2013.

== See also ==
- Extensive reading
