= Ernest Ziaja =

Polish ice hockey player

- Born: April 11, 1919; Siemianowice Śląskie, Poland
- Died: August 29, 1997 (aged 78); Siemianowice Śląskie, Poland
- Position: Centre
- Played for: HKS Siemianowiczanki
- National team: Poland
- Playing career: 1938–1948

Ernest Ziaja (11 April 1919 – 29 August 1997) was a Polish ice hockey player. He played for HKS Siemianowiczanki during his career. He also played for the Polish national team at the 1948 Winter Olympics.
