= Fred Linkmeyer =

American fencer

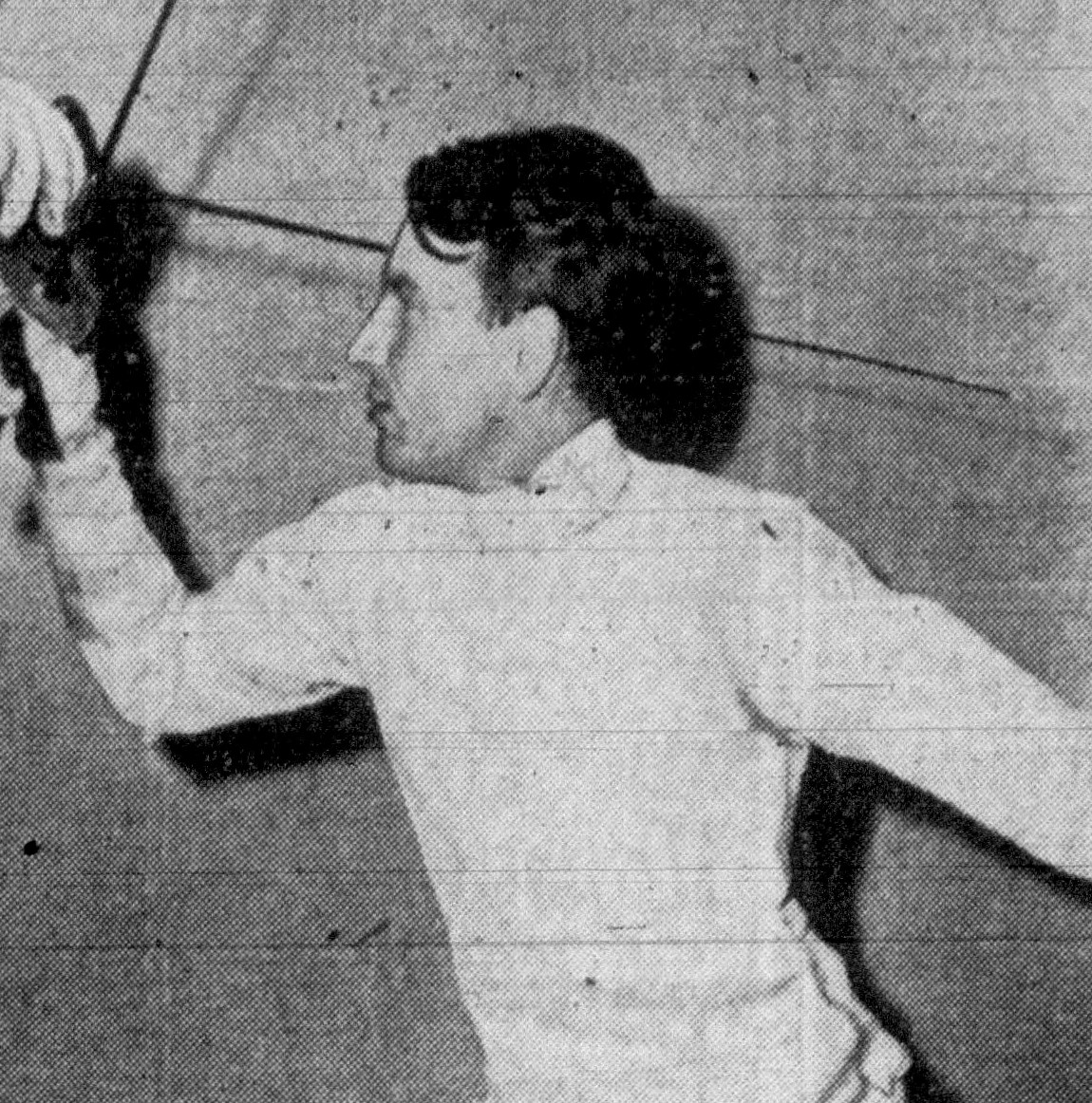
Linkmeyer, circa 1942

Fred Linkmeyer (16 June 1909 - 15 April 1988), was an American fencer, who was a 3-time national épée champion.

He fenced primarily in Los Angeles, where he attended the University of Southern California. He graduated from USC in 1931.

The USFA sanctioned USC Linkmeyer Invitational is held annually in his honor by the USC Fencing Club.

== See also ==
- Fencing
- USFA
- USFA Hall of Fame
