= Louis François (wrestler) =

French wrestler (1906–1986)

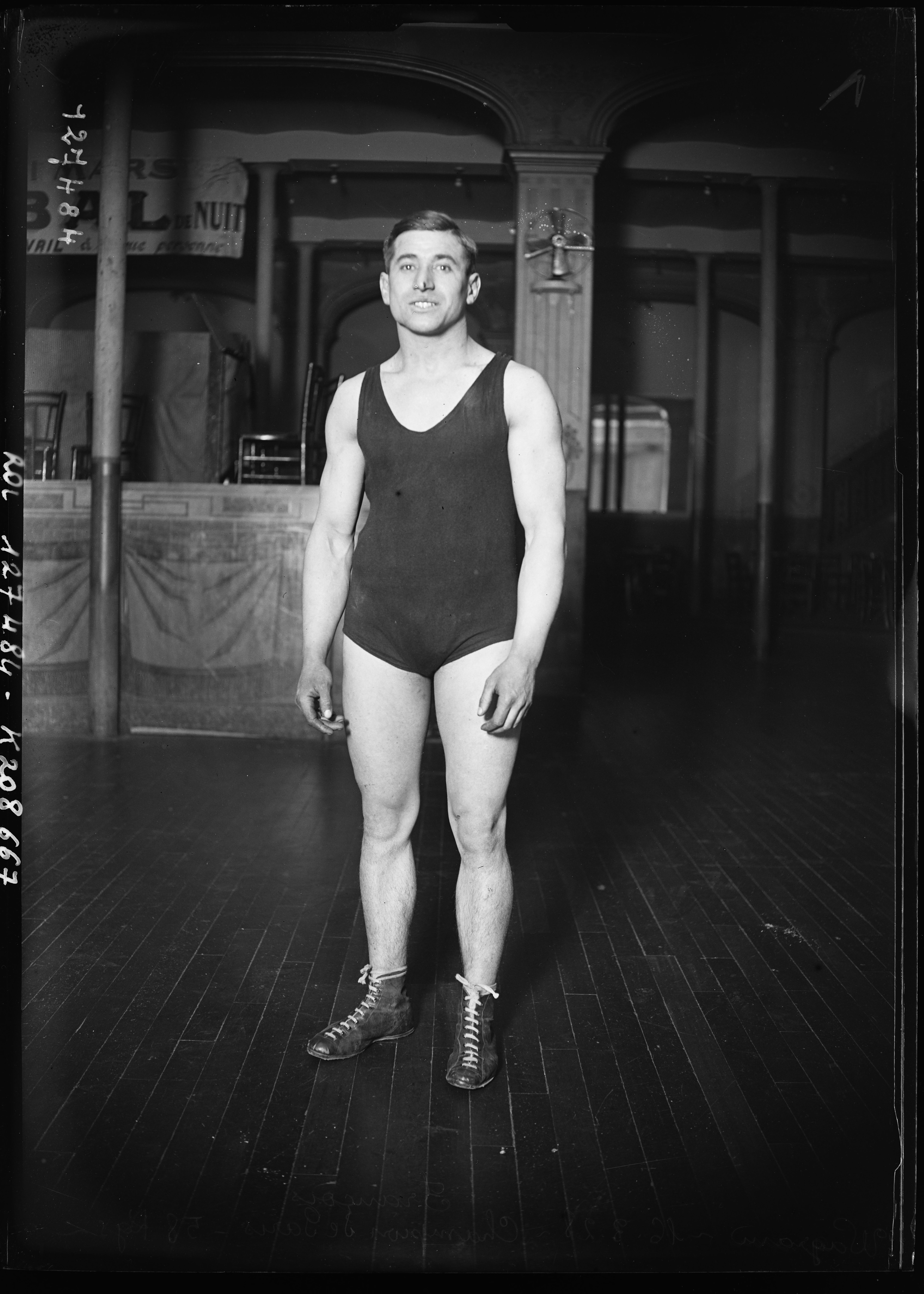
- François in 1928

Personal information
- Born: 24 July 1906 Lavaveix-les-Mines, France
- Died: 15 November 1986 (aged 80) Donnemarie-Dontilly, France

Sport
- Sport: Greco-Roman wrestling
- Club: US Métro, Paris
Medal record
Men's Greco-Roman wrestling
Representing France
Olympic Games
| Bronze medal – third place | 1932 Los Angeles | Bantamweight |

Louis Vincent François (24 July 1906 – 15 November 1986) was a Greco-Roman wrestler from France who won a bronze medal at the 1932 Summer Olympics.

François was born in a family of miners, which later moved to Paris and became cement workers. He won seven national titles, in 1928, 1930–33, 1935 and 1937. François was an RATP employee by profession, and in parallel worked as a wrestling coach at US Metro and referee.
