= Rob Denton =

American soccer player and referee (1907–1997)

Personal information
- Date of birth: November 20, 1907
- Place of birth: Philadelphia, Pennsylvania, United States
- Date of death: August 12, 1997 (aged 89)
- Place of death: United States
- Position: Goalkeeper

Senior career*
Years	Team	Apps	(Gls)
1935–	Philadelphia German-Americans		
–1939	Philadelphia Passon		
- * Club domestic league appearances and goals

Rob Denton (November 20, 1907 – August 12, 1997) was an American soccer goalkeeper who was a member of the United States soccer team at the 1936 Summer Olympics. He also played six seasons in the American Soccer League and later served as a referee.

Denton signed with the Philadelphia German-Americans in 1935, later moving to Philadelphia Passon. He left the ASL in 1939. In 1935, Denton and his teammates won the league title. A year later, they won the 1936 National Challenge Cup. He was selected for the 1936 U.S. Olympic soccer team, but did not play in the lone U.S. game of the tournament. He later served as a referee in the Philadelphia leagues.
