= Johnny Egan (Australian footballer) =

Australian rules footballer

Personal information
- Full name: William John Egan
- Born: 22 February 1898; Koo Wee Rup, Victoria
- Died: 22 April 1988 (aged 90); Berwick, Victoria
- Original team: Koo Wee Rup

Playing career^{1}
Years	Club	Games (Goals)
1924	Melbourne	3 (1)
- ^{1} Playing statistics correct to the end of 1924.

William John Egan (22 February 1898 – 22 April 1988) was an Australian rules footballer who played with Melbourne in the Victorian Football League (VFL).
