= Dick Day (footballer) =

Australian rules footballer

Personal information
- Full name: Richard James Day
- Born: 17 February 1920
- Died: 5 August 1997 (aged 77); Auchenflower, Queensland
- Original team: Yarraville
- Height: 171 cm (5 ft 7 in)
- Weight: 66 kg (146 lb)

Playing career^{1}
Years	Club	Games (Goals)
1943	North Melbourne	2 (0)
- ^{1} Playing statistics correct to the end of 1943.

Richard James Day (17 February 1920 – 5 August 1997) was an Australian rules footballer who played with North Melbourne in the Victorian Football League (VFL).
