= A Stanza of Sunlight on the Banks of Brahmaputra =

Book by Arnab Jan Deka

- Authors: Arnab Jan Deka and Tess Joyce
- Original title: Brahmaputrar Parot Ephanki Rhode (Assamese)
- Language: English & Assamese
- Genre: British Literature, Assamese Literature
- Publisher: Philling Books (UK), Spectrum Publications (India)
- Publication date: 31 July 2009
- Publication place: United Kingdom, India
- Media type: Print (Paperback),
- Pages: 97
- ISBN: 978-81-83440-20-2

A Stanza of Sunlight on the Banks of Brahmaputra is the first collaborative Indo-British bilingual book of poetry in English and Assamese, under the joint authorship of novelist, short-story writer, columnist and poet Arnab Jan Deka and poet, blogger and novelist Tess Joyce. The book received international recognition from publications in both England and India. This book was first published in 2009, in both the UK and India, by Philling Books (UK) and Spectrum Publications (India).

== Background ==
A Stanza of Sunlight is a collaboration between James Joyce descendant Tess Joyce and well-known Indian poet Arnab Jan Deka. The book contains some poems composed in 2009 by British poet, environmentalist and novelist Tess Joyce together with some of the early poems of Arnab Jan Deka composed during his days as a student. Later the author's literary biography was incorporated in the End Century Edition of the Academy's publication Who's Who of Indian Writers 1999.

The book's campaign focused on raising awareness of the ecological issues faced by the river, including pollution, floods and erosion, endangered species such as river dolphins, waste and pollution, and the planned construction of national and international dams on and around the river.

== Poetry ==
The book contains 24 poems by Deka and 21 poems by Joyce. Joyce's poems are translated into Assamese by Deka, while Deka's poems have been translated into English by Joyce.

Both poets' themes in the book revolve around the banks of the river Brahmaputra. The poems contain both scenic, evocative, and spiritual contents, and also highlights the environmental fragility of the river and its surrounding flora and fauna. Many of the poems are set in Assam, but several are set in other locations in India such as Delhi, Meghalaya, and Noida.

== Critical reception ==
Arindam Barooh wrote a review in The Assam Tribune that read "the mystical yet riveting Brahmaputra has always been the most liked metaphor in major literary works of several writers and poets, but, Arnab Deka’s and Tess Joyce’s poems have something unique to say to arouse readers’ inquisitive senses." Also noting that "the Poems are simple to read and easy to comprehend. Each of the poems is different from one another. Be its content, style of narration and imaginative aspect but, it connects and goes with the same motif."

== Preservation at London Poetry Library ==
The London Poetry Library, which collects and preserves books of poetry of high literary value, has preserved A Stanza of Sunlight on the Banks of Brahmaputra in its library in London.
