= Herman Tuvesson =

Swedish wrestler

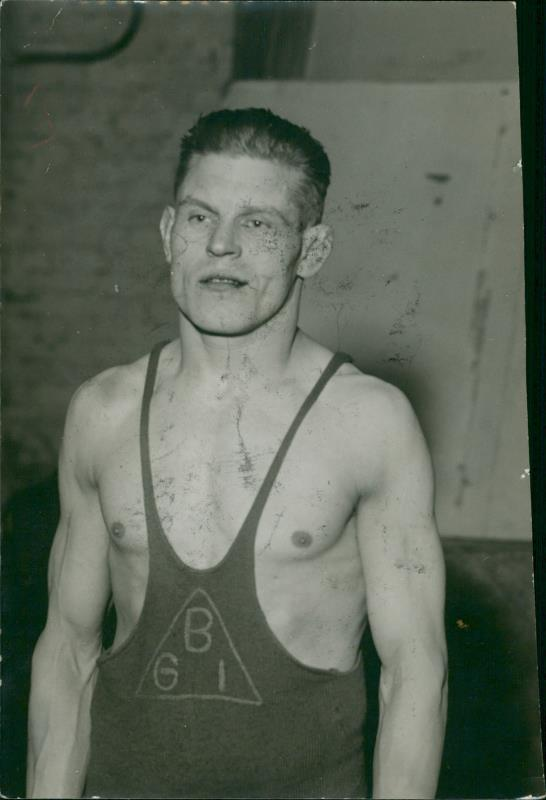

Personal information
- Nationality: Swedish
- Born: 21 October 1902; Vankiva, Sweden
- Died: 2 February 1995 (aged 92); Bjärnum, Sweden

Sport
- Sport: Wrestling

Herman Tuvesson (21 October 1902 – 2 February 1995) was a Swedish wrestler. He competed at the 1932 Summer Olympics and the 1936 Summer Olympics.
