= Ödön Zombori =

Hungarian wrestler (1906–1989)

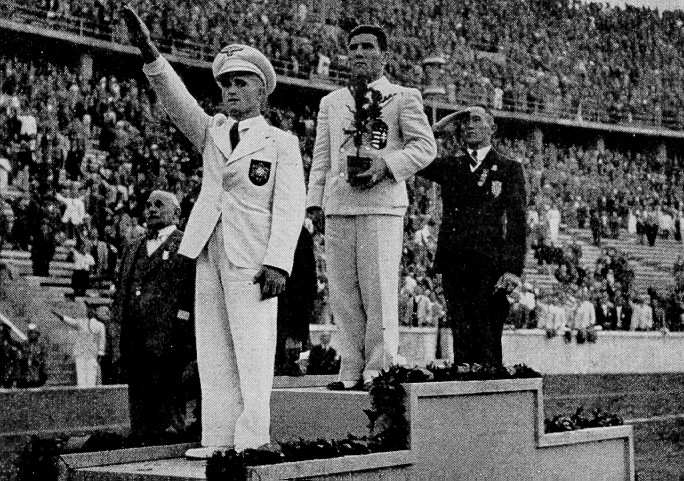
- Zombori (Olympic Champion, 1936) at the announcement of the results, holding the gift with oak sapling

Personal information
- Born: September 16, 1906 Szenta, Austro-Hungarian Empire
- Died: November 29, 1989 (aged 83) Budapest, Hungary
Medal record
Men's freestyle wrestling
Representing Hungary
Olympic Games
Gold medal – first place	1936 Berlin	Bantamweight
Silver medal – second place	1932 Los Angeles	Bantamweight

Ödön Zombori, originally Ödön Janicsek (16 September 1906 – 29 November 1989) was a Hungarian wrestler and Olympic champion in freestyle wrestling.

== Olympics ==
Zombori competed at the 1936 Summer Olympics in Berlin where he received a gold medal in Freestyle wrestling, the bantamweight class. He received a silver medal in 1932. During the 1984 Olympics in Los Angeles, California Zombori was invited to attend a number of events as he and his wife Anna lived in the Hollywood area of Los Angeles at the time. As his health began to deteriorate he wished to return to Hungary and lived for some time at a home in Hungary for retired Olympic and Sports champions. He died in 1989 due to complications from Alzheimer's disease.
