= Jens Lundgaard =

Danish footballer (1911–1997)

Personal information
- Date of birth: 13 July 1911
- Date of death: 4 August 1997 (aged 86)

International career
| Years | Team | Apps | (Gls) |
| 1937 | Denmark | 1 | (0) |

Jens Lundgaard (13 July 1911 – 4 August 1997) was a Danish footballer. He played in one match for the Denmark national football team in 1937.
