= Georgios Zervinis =

Greek wrestler

- Born: 1905; Tinos, Greece
- Died: 1983 (aged 77–78)

Georgios Zervinis (1905 – 1983) was a Greek wrestler. He competed at the 1924, 1928 and the 1932 Summer Olympics.
