= Marcello Nizzola =

Italian wrestler (1900–1947)

Medal record

Representing Italy

Men's Greco-Roman wrestling

Olympic Games
| Silver medal – second place | 1932 Los Angeles | Bantamweight |

Marcello Nizzola (7 December 1900 – 22 July 1947) was an Italian wrestler and Olympic medalist in Greco-Roman wrestling. Nizzola competed at the 1932 Summer Olympics in Los Angeles where he received a silver medal in Greco-Roman wrestling, the bantamweight class. He also competed at the 1936 Summer Olympics.
