= Aatos Jaskari =

Finnish wrestler (1904–1962)

Medal record

Men's freestyle wrestling

Representing Finland

Olympic Games
Bronze medal – third place	1932 Los Angeles	Bantamweight

Aatos Jaskari (April 26, 1904 – March 16, 1962) was a Finnish wrestler and Olympic medalist. He received a bronze medal in freestyle wrestling at the 1932 Summer Olympics in Los Angeles. He also competed at the 1936 Summer Olympics.
