= India at the 1952 Summer Olympics =

- IOC code: IND
- NOC: Indian Olympic Association

in Helsinki
- Competitors: 64 (60 men, 4 women) in 11 sports
- Flag bearer: Balbir Singh Sr.
- Medals Ranked 26th: Gold 1 Silver 0 Bronze 1 Total 2

Summer Olympics appearances (overview)
- 1900; 1904–1912; 1920; 1924; 1928; 1932; 1936; 1948; 1952; 1956; 1960; 1964; 1968; 1972; 1976; 1980; 1984; 1988; 1992; 1996; 2000; 2004; 2008; 2012; 2016; 2020; 2024

India competed at the 1952 Summer Olympics in Helsinki, Finland. 64 competitors, 60 men and 4 women, took part in 42 events in 11 sports. This marked the second time India had competed as an independent republic.

== Medalists ==
=== Gold ===
- Kunwar Digvijai Singh (c), Leslie Claudius, Keshav Dutt, Chinadorai Deshmutu, Randhir Singh Gentle, Grahanandan Singh, Ranganandhan Francis, Jaswant Singh Rajput, Balbir Singh Sr., Dharam Singh, Govind Perumal, Raghbir Lal, Udham Singh, Chaman Singh Gurung and Muniswamy Rajgopal — Field hockey, Men's Team Competition.

=== Bronze ===
- Khashaba Jadhav — Wrestling, Men's Freestyle Bantamweight

== Athletics ==
First Female Contingent

Athletics

- Mary Dsouza
- Nilima Ghose

== Boxing ==
Men's Flyweight:

- Sakti Mazumdar

1. First Round – Defeated Nguyen Van Cua of Vietnam (DNS)
2. Second Round – Lost to Han Soo-An of Korea (0 - 3)

Men's Featherweight:

- Benoy Kumar Bose

1. First Round – Defeated Edson Brown of the United States (0 - 3)

Men's Welterweight:

- Ron Norris

1. Second Round – Defeated Jacob Butula of Canada (TKO 3R)
2. Third Round – Lost to Victor Jörgensen of Denmark (0 - 3)

Men's Light Heavyweight:

- Oscar Alfred Ward

1. First Round – Lost to Karl Kistner of Germany (KO)

== Cycling ==
=== Road Competition ===
Men's Individual Road Race (190.4 km)

- Raj Kumar Mehra — did not finish (→ no ranking)
- Netai Bysack — did not finish (→ no ranking)
- Prodip Bose — did not finish (→ no ranking)
- Suprovat Chakravarty — did not finish (→ no ranking)

=== Track Competition ===
Men's 1.000m Time Trial

- Suprovat Chakravarty

- Final — 1:26.0 (→ 27th and last place)

Men's 1.000m Sprint Scratch Race

- Netai Bysack — 24th place

== Shooting ==
Two shooters represented India in 1952.

300 m rifle, three positions

- Harihar Banerjee

50 m rifle, three positions

- Harihar Banerjee

50 m rifle, prone

- Harihar Banerjee
- Souren Choudhury

== Swimming ==
Men

Ranks given are within the heat.

| Athlete | Event | Heat | | Semifinal | | Final | |
| Athlete | Event | Time | Rank | Time | Rank | Time | Rank |
|---|---|---|---|---|---|---|---|
| Isaac Mansoor | 100 m freestyle | 1:10.8 | 7 | Did not advance | | | |
| Bijoy Barman | 100 m backstroke | 1:27.3 | 5 | Did not advance | | | |
| Khamlillal Shah | 100 m backstroke | 1:18.3 | 7 | Did not advance | | | |

Women

Ranks given are within the heat.

| Athlete | Event | Heat | | Semifinal | | Final | |
| Athlete | Event | Time | Rank | Time | Rank | Time | Rank |
|---|---|---|---|---|---|---|---|
| Dolly Nazir | 100 m freestyle | 1:24.6 | 7 | Did not advance | | | |
| Dolly Nazir | 200 m breaststroke | 3:37.9 | 7 | Did not advance | | | |
| Arati Saha | 200 m breaststroke | 3:40.8 | 6 | Did not advance | | | |

== Water polo ==
Birendra Basak • David Sopher • Kedar Shah • Isaac Mansoor • Sambhu Saha • Sachin Nag • Khamlillal Shah • Bijoy Barman • Jehangir Naegamwalla • Ran Chandnani (source: olympedia.org)

== Wrestling ==
Key:

- VT - Victory by Fall.
- Pt - Decision by Points.
- Pd - Decision by Points but Judges disagree.

Men's freestyle

| Athlete | Event | Round 1 Result | Round 2 Result | Round 3 Result | Round 4 Result | Round 5 Result | Round 6 Result | Round 7 Result | Round 8 Result | Rank |
|---|---|---|---|---|---|---|---|---|---|---|
| Niranjan Das | −52 kg | Mahmoud Mollaghasemi (IRN); L ^{VT} | H. Weber (GER); L ^{VT} | Did not Advance | | | | | | − |
| Khashaba Dadasaheb Jadhav | −57 kg | A. Poliquin (CAN); W ^{VT} | P. L. Basurto (MEX); W ^{VT} | F. Schmitz (GER); W ^{Pt} | —N/a | Rashid Mammadbeyov (URS); L ^{Pt} | Shohachi Ishii (JPN); L ^{Pt} | Did not Advance | | 3rd place, bronze medalist(s) |
| Keshav Mangave | −62 kg | —N/a | I. Lugo (VEN); WalkOver | Nasser Givehchi (IRN); L ^{Pt} | A. Bernard (CAN); W ^{VT} | Josiah Henson (USA); L ^{Pt} | Did not Advance | | | 4 |
| Shrirang Jadhav | −87 kg | J. Theron (RSA); L ^{Pt} | A. Englas (URS); L ^{VT} | Did not Advance | | | | | | − |
