= Deaths in April 1997 =

The following is a list of notable deaths in April 1997.

Entries for each day are listed alphabetically by surname. A typical entry lists information in the following sequence:

- Name, age, country of citizenship at birth, subsequent country of citizenship (if applicable), reason for notability, cause of death (if known), and reference.

== April 1997 ==
=== 1 ===
- Milton Brunson, 67, American gospel musician and pastor.
- Jack Carroll, 66, Canadian Olympic sprinter (1952).
- Evsey Domar, 82, Russian American economist.
- Jolie Gabor, 100, Hungarian-American socialite.
- John R. Hargrove Sr., 73, American attorney and district judge (United States District Court for the District of Maryland).
- Makar Honcharenko, 84, Soviet-Ukrainian football player and coach.
- Jerry Pacht, 75, American judge, cerebral hemorrhage.
- Franz Seltenheim, 82, Austrian Olympic swimmer (1936).

=== 2 ===
- Zaki Badr, 71, Egyptian general and politician.
- Al Blanche, 87, American baseball player (Boston Braves/Bees).
- Anthony Bushell, 92, English film actor and director.
- Craig D. Button, 32, United States Air Force pilot, suicide by plane crash.
- Zsolt Durkó, 62, Hungarian composer.
- Orvis A. Kennedy, 89, Canadian politician, member of the House of Commons of Canada (1938-1940).
- Reg Lewis, 77, English football player.
- Yulii Meitus, 94, Ukrainian composer.
- David Shahar, 70, Israeli fiction writer, translator, and editor.
- Tomoyuki Tanaka, 86, Japanese film producer, stroke.

=== 3 ===
- Thomas Barthel, 74, German ethnologist and epigrapher.
- Jerome Cosentino, 65, American politician.
- Sergei Filatov, 70, Soviet and Russian equestrian and Olympian (1956, 1960, 1964).
- Ivor McIvor, 79, Australian rules footballer.
- Dan Swartz, 62, American basketball player (Boston Celtics).
- John Ugelstad, 76, Norwegian chemical engineer and inventor.
- Robert W. Ward, 67, American businessman and politician, cancer.
- Henriette Wyeth, 79, American artist.

=== 4 ===
- Lawrence A. Appley, 93, American organizational theorist.
- Kevin Coverdale, 56, Australian rules footballer.
- Herta Ehlert, 92, German nazi camp guard during World War II.
- Billy Graham, 61, American comics artist.
- Sugimura Haruko, 88, Japanese actress.
- Leo Picard, 96, Israeli geologist.
- Mike Raven, 72, British radio disc jockey, actor and sculptor.
- Vladimir Soloukhin, 72, Russian poet and writer.
- Shoichiro Takenaka, 84, Japanese Olympic long-distance runner (1932).
- Alparslan Türkeş, 79, Turkish politician, heart attack.
- Rudolf Ulrich, 75, German film actor.

=== 5 ===
- Ignazio Buttitta, 97, Italian poet.
- Heberto Castillo, 58, Mexican political activist.
- Richard Clifton-Dey, 66, British artist.
- Paul W. Cronin, 59, American politician, member of the United States House of Representatives (1973-1975), brain cancer.
- Paul de Bruyn, 89, German athlete and Olympian (1932, 1936).
- Stoney Edwards, 67, American country singer, stomach cancer.
- Allen Ginsberg, 70, American poet and writer, liver cancer.
- Warren Godfrey, 66, Canadian ice hockey player (Boston Bruins, Detroit Red Wings).
- August Heckscher II, 83, American public intellectual and writer, heart failure.
- Bill Holland, 81, American baseball player (Washington Senators).
- Aklilu Lemma, 61, Ethiopian scientist.
- John R. McKinney, 76, American soldier and recipient of the Medal of Honor.
- Riley Morris, 62-63, American football player (Oakland Raiders, Boston/New Bedford Sweepers).
- Albino Simões Neto, 73, Portuguese Olympic rower (1948, 1952).

=== 6 ===
- Max Alvarado, 68, Filipino actor, heart failure.
- Bernard Chevallier, 84, French Olympic equestrian (1948).
- Jack Kent Cooke, 84, Canadian-American businessman, cardiac arrest, heart attack.
- Stephan Hermlin, 81, German author.
- Peter Jeffrey, 83, Royal Australian Air Force officer and flying ace.
- David Keith-Lucas, 86, British aeronautical engineer.
- Frank Kirwin, 75, Australian rules footballer.
- Barbara Yu Ling, Singapore-British actress.
- Joaquin Mazdak Luttinger, 73, American physicist.
- Rosita Serrano, 84, Chilean singer, chronic bronchitis.
- Pierre-Henri Teitgen, 88, French lawyer, professor and politician.

=== 7 ===
- Luis Aloma, 73, Cuban baseball player (Chicago White Sox).
- Josef Deutschmann, 76, Austrian Olympic cross-country skier (1948).
- Aaron Kramer, 75, American poet and social activist.
- Sam Parks, Jr., 87, American golfer.
- Georgy Shonin, 61, Soviet cosmonaut (Soyuz 6), heart attack.

=== 8 ===
- Kwame Baah, 58, Ghanaian soldier and politician.
- Bob Cain, 72, American baseball player (Chicago White Sox, Detroit Tigers, St. Louis Browns), cancer.
- Charles Hayes, 79, American politician, member of the United States House of Representatives (1983-1993), lung cancer.
- Laura Nyro, 49, American songwriter, singer, and pianist, ovarian cancer.
- Homer Peel, 94, American baseball player (St. Louis Cardinals, Philadelphia Phillies, New York Giants), and manager.
- Alejo Peralta, 80, Mexican baseball executive.

=== 9 ===
- Mae Boren Axton, 82, American songwriter and music promoter.
- Joe Coleman, 74, American baseball player (Philadelphia Athletics, Baltimore Orioles, Detroit Tigers).
- Helene Hanff, 80, American writer, peritonitis, diabetes.
- Geoffrey Hardy-Roberts, 89, British Army officer, politician and courtier.
- John Hollar, 74, American football player (Washington Redskins, Detroit Lions).
- Yank Rachell, 94, American country blues musician.
- Stevo Teodosievski, 72, Macedonian artist and humanist.
- Wu Zuoren, 88, Chinese painter.

=== 10 ===
- Bèto Adriana, 71, Antillean sportsman and Olympian (1960, 1972).
- Erik Blumenfeld, 82, German politician.
- Michael Dorris, 52, American novelist and scholar, suicide.
- Stan Eastham, 83, English footballer and Olympian (1936).
- Fred Emery, 71, Australian psychologist.
- Alan Gibson, 73, English journalist, writer and radio broadcaster.
- Ben Gregory, 50, American football player (Buffalo Bills).
- Gösta Johansson, 68, Swedish ice hockey player and Olympian (1952), liver cancer.
- Marcel Maes, 52, Belgian cyclist.
- Toshiro Mayuzumi, 68, Japanese composer.
- Mehtab, 78, Indian actress.
- Martin Schwarzschild, 84, German-American astrophysicist.
- Edgar Sulite, 39, Filipino martial arts teacher.
- Francis Walder, 90, Belgian writer and soldier.
- Glanville Williams, 86, Welsh legal scholar.

=== 11 ===
- Castor de Andrade, 71, Brazilian mobster and bicheiro.
- Yehia Emam, 78, Egyptian footballer and Olympian (1948).
- Muriel McQueen Fergusson, 97, Canadian activist, judge and politician.
- Rajko Kojić, 40, Serbian/Yugoslav guitarist.
- Milt Smith, 68, American baseball player (Cincinnati Redlegs).
- Radovan Stojičić, 46, Serbian police general, leader of the Public Security Service and acting Minister of Internal Affairs of Serbia.
- Wang Xiaobo, 44, Chinese novelist and essayist, heart attack.
- Junzō Yoshimura, 88, Japanese architect.

=== 12 ===
- Kevin Belcher, 35, American football player (Los Angeles Raiders, Denver Broncos).
- Wally Catchlove, 90, Australian cricketer.
- Ivar Eriksson, 87, Swedish football defender.
- Nechama Leibowitz, 91, Israeli bible scholar and commentator.
- Moro Lorenzo, Filipino basketball player and executive.
- Dorothy Norman, 92, American photographer, writer, and arts patron.
- Eric Pearce, 92, Australian broadcaster.
- James Ross, 85, Scottish surgeon.
- Jørgine Stene Sørensen, 91, Norwegian chemist.
- George Wald, 90, American scientist and recipient of the Nobel Prize in Physiology or Medicine.

=== 13 ===
- Mustafa Amin or Mostafa Amin, 83, Egyptian columnist and journalist.
- Madhava Ashish, 77, British-Indian spiritualist, mystic, writer and agriculturist.
- Dorothy Frooks, 101, American author, lawyer, and suffragist.
- Josef Krejci, 86, Austrian Olympic handball player (1936).
- David McCord, 99, American poet.
- Shuhei Nishida, 86, Japanese Olympic pole vaulter (1932, 1936), heart failure.
- Harry Rosenberg, 88, American baseball player (New York Giants).
- Zbigniew Szajewski, 82, Polish Olympic wrestler (1936, 1952).
- Voldemar Väli, 94, Estonian Greco-Roman wrestler and Olympic medalist (1924, 1928, 1936).
- Foffie Williams, 83, West Indian cricketer.

=== 14 ===
- Gerda Christian, 83, German private secretary of Adolf Hitler during World War II, cancer.
- Count Geoffrey Potocki de Montalk, 93, New Zealand poet, polemicist and pretender to the Polish throne.
- Kit Denton, 68, Australian writer and broadcaster.
- Gus Dugas, 90, Canadian-born baseball outfielder (Pittsburgh Pirates, Philadelphia Phillies, Washington Senators).
- Rusty Jackson, 46, American football player (Los Angeles Rams, Buffalo Bills).
- John Jennings, 94, English footballer.
- Michael Stroka, 58, American television actor, kidney cancer.
- Walter Taylor, 84, American anthropologist and archaeologist.
- Finn Wold, 69, Norwegian-American biochemist, cancer.

=== 15 ===
- Don Bexley, 87, American actor and comedian, heart and kidney failure.
- L. Brent Bozell, Jr., 71, American conservative activist and Roman Catholic writer.
- David Dockendorf, 73, American sound engineer.
- Bob Friedrichs, 90, American baseball player (Washington Senators).
- Jaime Garcia Goulart, 89, Portuguese Catholic missionary and bishop.
- Jim Holloway, 88, American baseball player (Philadelphia Phillies).
- Zdeněk Mlynář, 66, Czech politic writer, political analyst and lawyer.
- Sam Moskowitz, 76, American writer, critic, and science fiction historian.
- Harry Nicholas, 92, British trade unionist.
- Kō Nishimura, 74, Japanese actor.
- Sipan Shiraz, 29, Armenian poet, sculptor and painter.
- Carlos Enrique Taboada, 67, Mexican screenwriter and director.
- Richard Tousey, 88, American astronomer, pneumonia.

=== 16 ===
- Doris Angleton, 46, American socialite and murder victim, shot.
- Jan Bruins, 56, Dutch motorcycle road racer.
- Esmeralda Arboleda Cadavid, 76, Colombian activist, politician and diplomat, kidney failure.
- John Elliott, 62, Australian Olympic wrestler (1952, 1956).
- Thaddeus Golas, 72, American writer.
- Doug McMahon, 79, Canadian soccer player.
- Emilio Azcárraga Milmo, 66, Mexican newspaper publisher, pancreatic cancer.
- Roland Topor, 59, French graphic artist, author and actor, cerebral hemorrhage.
- Claude Tresmontant, 71, French philosopher, hellenist and theologian.

=== 17 ===
- Mitsu Arakawa, 69, American professional wrestler, heart failure.
- Dale Burnett, 88, American gridiron football player (New York Giants).
- Tom Franckhauser, 59, American gridiron football player (Los Angeles Rams, Dallas Cowboys, Minnesota Vikings), heart attack.
- Allan Francovich, 56, American film maker, heart attack.
- Chaim Herzog, 78, Israeli politician, general, and author.
- Henry George Lang, 78, New Zealand economist, university professor and company director.
- Gérard Lecomte, 70, French arabist.
- Biju Patnaik, 81, Indian politician, aviator and businessman.
- Mary French Rockefeller, 86, American heiress, socialite and philanthropist.
- Hena Rodríguez, 81, Colombian sculptor.

=== 18 ===
- Rolf Andersson, 67, Swedish football player.
- Edward Barker, 46, English cartoonist.
- Bob Carpenter, 79, American basketball player (Fort Wayne Pistons, Tri-Cities Blackhawks).
- Herbert Czaja, 82, German politician.
- Jeanne Hoban, 72, British Trotskyist, Alzheimer's disease.
- Francis Johnson, 86, American Olympic basketball player (1936).
- Don Pietromonaco, 61, American actor and radio personality, complications from emphysema.
- Eddie Quigley, 75, English football player and manager.
- Juan Félix Sánchez, 95, Venezuelan folk artist.
- Georgia Schmidt, 92, American actress.

=== 19 ===
- Walter Gordon, 77, United States Army soldier during World War II.
- Eldon Hoke, 39, American musician, railroad accident.
- Carl Walter Liner, 82, Swiss painter.
- Alexander Slawik, 96, German nazi cryptographer and Japanese ethnologist.
- Maria Wittek, 97, Polish officer during World War II.

=== 20 ===
- Eva Blanco, 16, Spanish girl and murder victim, stabbed.
- Pai Hsiao-yen, 16, Taiwanese girl and murder victim, murdered.
- Jean Louis, 89, French-American costume designer.
- Henry Mucci, 88, United States Army Rangers colonel, stroke.
- Joseph Van Muylders, 73, Belgian Olympic field hockey player (1948).
- Sun Ma Sze Tsang, 80, Cantonese opera singer and actor in Hong Kong.
- Henri Vilbert, 93, French actor.

=== 21 ===
- Alfred Bailey, 92, Canadian poet, anthropologist and ethno-historian.
- Diosdado Macapagal, 86, President of the Philippines and poet, heart failure and pneumonia.
- Thomas H. D. Mahoney, 83, American professor and politician.
- Sayed Mekawy, 69, Egyptian singer and composer.
- József Mészáros, 74, Hungarian football player and football manager.
- Andrés Rodríguez, 73, President of Paraguay (1989–1993), cancer.
- Magda Staudinger, 94, Latvian biologist and botanist.
- Aníbal Tarabini, 55, Argentine football player, traffic collision.
- Nicolas Eugene Walsh, 80, American prelate of the Roman Catholic Church.
- Herbert Zipper, 92, Austrian-American composer, conductor, and Dachau concentration camp inmate.

=== 22 ===
- Jean Carlu, 96, French graphic designer.
- Néstor Cerpa Cartolini, 43, Peruvian communist and revolutionary, killed in action.
- Moelwyn Merchant, 83, Welsh academic, novelist, sculptor, poet and Anglican priest.
- Elliott Merrick, 91, American author.
- Pete Petrow, 72, Canadian football player.

=== 23 ===
- Allan Bouch, 94, Australian rules footballer.
- Thomas Carr, 89, American actor and film director.
- Denis Compton, 78, English cricketer, sepsis.
- Miklós Fodor, 88, Hungarian Olympic handball player (1936).
- Esther Schiff Goldfrank, 100-101, American anthropologist.
- Dorothy Hill, 89, Australian geologist and palaeontologist.
- Jerry Nuzum, 73, American football player (Pittsburgh Steelers).
- Erwin Reimer, 82, Chilean Olympic decathlete (1936).
- Camillo Ripamonti, 77, Italian politician and engineer.
- Beatrice Seear, Baroness Seear, 83, British social scientist and politician.
- Inge Viermetz, 89, Nazi Germany official.

=== 24 ===
- Abdurakhman Avtorkhanov, 88, Soviet/Chechen historian and writer.
- John A. Brown Jr., 35, American convicted murderer, execution by lethal injection.
- Robert Erickson, 80, American composer and author, polymyositis.
- Felice Ippolito, 81, Italian geologist and politician.
- Bohumil Kosour, 84, Czech Olympic skier (1948).
- Bill McArthur, 78, American football player and coach.
- Hubert McLean, 89, New Zealand rugby player.
- Roland Prout, 77, British Olympic canoeist (1952).
- Eugene Stoner, 74, American firearms designer, cancer.
- Ines Vercesi, 81, Italian Olympic gymnast (1928).

=== 25 ===
- Aleksejs Auziņš, 86, Latvian football, ice hockey player, and Olympian (1936).
- Nicholas Baker, 58, British politician and minister.
- Kay Blumetta, 73, American baseball player.
- Lidia Istrati, 55, Moldovan writer and politician.
- Frank Joyner, 78, Scottish football player and manager.
- Brian May, 62, Australian film composer (Mad Max) and conductor, heart attack.
- Pat Paulsen, 69, American comedian and satirist, complications of pneumonia and kidney failure.
- Gino Pernice, 69, Italian actor.
- Dudley Pope, 71, British writer .
- Andreas Rett, 73, Austrian neurologist and author.
- Bernard Vonnegut, 82, American atmospheric scientist, cancer.
- Joan Yarde-Buller, 89, English socialite.
- Nikolai Yegorov, 45, Russian politician, lung cancer.
- Chia-Shun Yih, 78, Chinese-American engineer and physicist, heart failure.

=== 26 ===
- John Beal, 87, American actor, stroke.
- J. J. Colledge, 89, British naval historian and author.
- Wilhelm Crinius, 76, German Luftwaffe flying ace during World War II.
- Joey Faye, American comedian and actor.
- Hideo Fujimoto, 78, Japanese baseball pitcher, heart attack.
- Valery Obodzinsky, 55, Soviet and Russian tenor, heart attack.
- Howard Ensign Simmons, Jr., 67, American chemist.
- Peng Zhen, 94, Chinese politician and chairman of the NPCSC (1983–1988).

=== 27 ===
- Lew Dietz, 90, American writer.
- Gabriel Figueroa, 90, Mexican cinematographer.
- Paul Lambert, 74, American actor.
- Dulce María Loynaz, 94, Cuban poet, cancer.
- Patrick O'Connor, 87, American painter.
- Bunny Roger, 85, English couturier and socialite.
- Piotr Skrzynecki, 66, Polish choreographer, director and cabaret impresario, cancer.
- Jeffrey Trail, 28, American naval officer, murdered.
- Peter Winch, 71, British philosopher.

=== 28 ===
- Peter Tali Coleman, 77, Samoan Governor of American Samoa (1956–1961; 1978–1985; 1989–1993), liver cancer.
- Steve Conte, 77, Italian-American actor, Alzheimer's disease.
- Ashley Harvey-Walker, 52, English cricketer (Derbyshire County Cricket Club), murdered.
- Karl-Åke Hultberg, 81, Swedish Olympic equestrian (1948).
- Una Johnson, 91, American curator and art historian.
- Jan Kielas, 80, Polish Olympic middle-distance runner (1952).
- Earl Klapstein, 75, American football player (Pittsburgh Steelers), and coach.
- Ann Petry, 88, American children's author, novelist and journalist.
- William Percy Rogers, 82, Australian zoologist.
- John P. Snyder, 71, American cartographer.
- Peter Taylor, Baron Taylor of Gosforth, 66, British Lord Chief Justice of England (1992–1996), cancer.
- Doc Urich, 68, American football player and coach, heart attack.

=== 29 ===
- Keith Ferguson, 50, American bass guitarist, liver failure.
- Paul Mullins Gervais, 71, Canadian politician, member of the House of Commons of Canada (1968-1972).
- Georgy Klimov, 68, Russian linguist.
- Günther Laukien, 72, German physicist and entrepreneur.
- R. N. Malhotra, 71, Indian banker.
- Jaroslav Plíhal, 60, Czech Olympic shot putter (1960).
- Mike Royko, 64, American newspaper columnist, brain aneurysm.

=== 30 ===
- Miklós Fodor, 88, Hungarian field handball player and Olympian (1936).
- Michael Harbottle, 80, British Army officer.
- Josiah Lincoln Lowe, 92, American mycologist.
- Jorge Mondragón, 93, Mexican actor.
- Henry Gilford Picard, 90, American golfer.
- Roohangiz Saminejad, 80, Iranian actress.
- Wolfgang Späte, 85, German Luftwaffe flying ace during World War II.
- Vladimir Sukharev, 72, Soviet sprinter and Olympian (1952, 1956).
