= Wrestling at the 1952 Summer Olympics – Men's freestyle featherweight =

Wrestling at the Olympics

Men's freestyle featherweight at the Games of the XV Olympiad
- Venue: Messuhalli
- Dates: 20–23 July 1952
- Competitors: 21 from 21 nations

Medalists
1st place, gold medalist(s)		Bayram Şit	Turkey
2nd place, silver medalist(s)		Nasser Givehchi	Iran
3rd place, bronze medalist(s)		Joe Henson	United States

The men's freestyle featherweight competition at the 1952 Summer Olympics in Helsinki took place from 20 July to 23 July at Messuhalli. Nations were limited to one competitor. Featherweight was the third-lightest category, including wrestlers weighing 57 to 62 kilograms (125.7 to 136.7 lb).

== Competition format ==
This freestyle wrestling competition continued to use the "bad points" elimination system introduced at the 1928 Summer Olympics for Greco-Roman and at the 1932 Summer Olympics for freestyle wrestling, removing the slight modification introduced in 1936 and used until 1948 (which had a reduced penalty for a loss by 2–1 decision). Each round featured all wrestlers pairing off and wrestling one bout (with one wrestler having a bye if there were an odd number). The loser received 3 points. The winner received 1 point if the win was by decision and 0 points if the win was by fall. At the end of each round, any wrestler with at least 5 points was eliminated. This elimination continued until the medal rounds, which began when 3 wrestlers remained. These 3 wrestlers each faced each other in a round-robin medal round (with earlier results counting, if any had wrestled another before); record within the medal round determined medals, with bad points breaking ties.

== Results ==
=== Round 1 ===
Bouts

Winner	Nation	Victory Type	Loser	Nation
Armand Bernard	Canada	Fall	Ignacio Lugo	Venezuela
Risaburo Tominaga	Japan	Fall	Marco Antonio Girón	Guatemala
Rauno Mäkinen	Finland	Decision, 3–0	Rolf Ellerbrock	Germany
Géza Hoffmann	Hungary	Decision, 3–0	Jef Mewis	Belgium
Próspero Mammana	Argentina	Decision, 3–0	John Elliott	Australia
Antonio Randi	Italy	Fall	Joe Henson	United States
Henry Holmberg	Sweden	Decision, 3–0	Gonzalo Monte-Manibog	Philippines
Bayram Şit	Turkey	Fall	Roger Bielle	France
Ibrahim Dadashov	Soviet Union	Fall	Abdel Fattah Essawi	Egypt
Nasser Givehchi	Iran	Decision, 3–0	Herbie Hall	Great Britain
Keshav Mangave	India	Bye	N/A	N/A

Points

Rank	Wrestler	Nation	Start	Earned	Total
1	Armand Bernard	Canada	0	0	0
1	Ibrahim Dadashov	Soviet Union	0	0	0
1	Keshav Mangave	India	0	0	0
1	Antonio Randi	Italy	0	0	0
1	Bayram Şit	Turkey	0	0	0
1	Risaburo Tominaga	Japan	0	0	0
7	Nasser Givehchi	Iran	0	1	1
7	Géza Hoffmann	Hungary	0	1	1
7	Henry Holmberg	Sweden	0	1	1
7	Rauno Mäkinen	Finland	0	1	1
7	Próspero Mammana	Argentina	0	1	1
12	Roger Bielle	France	0	3	3
12	Rolf Ellerbrock	Germany	0	3	3
12	John Elliott	Australia	0	3	3
12	Abdel Fattah Essawi	Egypt	0	3	3
12	Marco Antonio Girón	Guatemala	0	3	3
12	Herbie Hall	Great Britain	0	3	3
12	Josiah Henson	United States	0	3	3
12	Ignacio Lugo	Venezuela	0	3	3
12	Jef Mewis	Belgium	0	3	3
12	Gonzalo Monte-Manibog	Philippines	0	3	3

=== Round 2 ===
Bouts

Winner	Nation	Victory Type	Loser	Nation
Keshav Mangave	India	Walkover	Ignacio Lugo	Venezuela
Armand Bernard	Canada	Fall	Marco Antonio Girón	Guatemala
Rauno Mäkinen	Finland	Fall	Risaburo Tominaga	Japan
Jef Mewis	Belgium	Decision, 3–0	Rolf Ellerbrock	Germany
Géza Hoffmann	Hungary	Fall	Próspero Mammana	Argentina
Joe Henson	United States	Fall	John Elliott	Australia
Henry Holmberg	Sweden	Decision, 3–0	Antonio Randi	Italy
Roger Bielle	France	Decision, 3–0	Gonzalo Monte-Manibog	Philippines
Bayram Şit	Turkey	Decision, 3–0	Ibrahim Dadashov	Soviet Union
Abdel Fattah Essawi	Egypt	Fall	Herbie Hall	Great Britain
Nasser Givehchi	Iran	Bye	N/A	N/A

Points

Rank	Wrestler	Nation	Start	Earned	Total
1	Armand Bernard	Canada	0	0	0
1	Keshav Mangave	India	0	0	0
3	Nasser Givehchi	Iran	1	0	1
3	Géza Hoffmann	Hungary	1	0	1
3	Rauno Mäkinen	Finland	1	0	1
3	Bayram Şit	Turkey	0	1	1
7	Henry Holmberg	Sweden	1	1	2
8	Ibrahim Dadashov	Soviet Union	0	3	3
8	Abdel Fattah Essawi	Egypt	3	0	3
8	Josiah Henson	United States	3	0	3
8	Antonio Randi	Italy	0	3	3
8	Risaburo Tominaga	Japan	0	3	3
13	Roger Bielle	France	3	1	4
13	Próspero Mammana	Argentina	1	3	4
13	Jef Mewis	Belgium	3	1	4
16	Rolf Ellerbrock	Germany	3	3	6
16	John Elliott	Australia	3	3	6
16	Marco Antonio Girón	Guatemala	3	3	6
16	Herbie Hall	Great Britain	3	3	6
16	Ignacio Lugo	Venezuela	3	3	6
16	Gonzalo Monte-Manibog	Philippines	3	3	6

=== Round 3 ===
Bouts

Winner	Nation	Victory Type	Loser	Nation
Nasser Givehchi	Iran	Decision, 3–0	Keshav Mangave	India
Risaburo Tominaga	Japan	Fall	Armand Bernard	Canada
Rauno Mäkinen	Finland	Decision, 3–0	Jef Mewis	Belgium
Joe Henson	United States	Fall	Géza Hoffmann	Hungary
Próspero Mammana	Argentina	Decision, 2–1	Antonio Randi	Italy
Bayram Şit	Turkey	Decision, 3–0	Henry Holmberg	Sweden
Ibrahim Dadashov	Soviet Union	Decision, 3–0	Roger Bielle	France
Abdel Fattah Essawi	Egypt	Bye	N/A	N/A

Points

Rank	Wrestler	Nation	Start	Earned	Total
1	Nasser Givehchi	Iran	1	1	2
1	Rauno Mäkinen	Finland	1	1	2
1	Bayram Şit	Turkey	1	1	2
4	Armand Bernard	Canada	0	3	3
4	Abdel Fattah Essawi	Egypt	3	0	3
4	Josiah Henson	United States	3	0	3
4	Keshav Mangave	India	0	3	3
4	Risaburo Tominaga	Japan	3	0	3
9	Ibrahim Dadashov	Soviet Union	3	1	4
9	Géza Hoffmann	Hungary	1	3	4
11	Henry Holmberg	Sweden	2	3	5
11	Próspero Mammana	Argentina	4	1	5
13	Antonio Randi	Italy	3	3	6
14	Roger Bielle	France	4	3	7
14	Jef Mewis	Belgium	4	3	7

=== Round 4 ===
Bouts

Winner	Nation	Victory Type	Loser	Nation
Nasser Givehchi	Iran	Decision, 2–1	Abdel Fattah Essawi	Egypt
Keshav Mangave	India	Fall	Armand Bernard	Canada
Risaburo Tominaga	Japan	Decision, 3–0	Géza Hoffmann	Hungary
Bayram Şit	Turkey	Fall	Rauno Mäkinen	Finland
Joe Henson	United States	Decision, 2–1	Ibrahim Dadashov	Soviet Union

Points

Rank	Wrestler	Nation	Start	Earned	Total
1	Bayram Şit	Turkey	2	0	2
2	Nasser Givehchi	Iran	2	1	3
2	Keshav Mangave	India	3	0	3
4	Josiah Henson	United States	3	1	4
4	Risaburo Tominaga	Japan	3	1	4
6	Rauno Mäkinen	Finland	2	3	5
7	Armand Bernard	Canada	3	3	6
7	Abdel Fattah Essawi	Egypt	3	3	6
9	Ibrahim Dadashov	Soviet Union	4	3	7
9	Géza Hoffmann	Hungary	4	3	7

=== Round 5 ===
Bouts

Winner	Nation	Victory Type	Loser	Nation
Nasser Givehchi	Iran	Decision, 2–1	Risaburo Tominaga	Japan
Joe Henson	United States	Decision, 3–0	Keshav Mangave	India
Bayram Şit	Turkey	Bye	N/A	N/A

Points

Rank	Wrestler	Nation	Start	Earned	Total
1	Bayram Şit	Turkey	2	0	2
2	Nasser Givehchi	Iran	3	1	4
3	Josiah Henson	United States	4	1	5
4	Keshav Mangave	India	3	3	6
5	Risaburo Tominaga	Japan	4	3	7

=== Medal rounds ===
None of the three wrestlers that made it to the medal rounds had faced each other previously, so each wrestled the other two. Şit defeated each of the other two wrestlers to take the gold medal; Givehchi prevailed over Henson to take silver.

Bouts

Winner	Nation	Victory Type	Loser	Nation
Bayram Şit	Turkey	Decision, 3–0	Nasser Givehchi	Iran
Bayram Şit	Turkey	Fall	Joe Henson	United States
Nasser Givehchi	Iran	Decision, 2–1	Joe Henson	United States

Points

Rank	Wrestler	Nation	Wins	Losses	Start	Earned	Total
1st place, gold medalist(s)	Bayram Şit	Turkey	2	0	2	1	3
2nd place, silver medalist(s)	Nasser Givehchi	Iran	1	1	4	4	8
3rd place, bronze medalist(s)	Josiah Henson	United States	0	2	5	6	11
