= Wrestling at the 1952 Summer Olympics – Men's freestyle light heavyweight =

Wrestling at the Olympics

Men's freestyle light heavyweight at the Games of the XV Olympiad
- Venue: Messuhalli
- Dates: 20–23 July 1952
- Competitors: 13 from 13 nations

Medalists
1st place, gold medalist(s)		Viking Palm	Sweden
2nd place, silver medalist(s)		Henry Wittenberg	United States
3rd place, bronze medalist(s)		Adil Atan	Turkey

The men's freestyle light heavyweight competition at the 1952 Summer Olympics in Helsinki took place from 20 July to 23 July at Messuhalli. Nations were limited to one competitor. Light heavyweight was the second-heaviest category, including wrestlers weighing 79 to 87 kilograms (174.2 to 191.8 lb).

== Competition format ==
This freestyle wrestling competition continued to use the "bad points" elimination system introduced at the 1928 Summer Olympics for Greco-Roman and at the 1932 Summer Olympics for freestyle wrestling, removing the slight modification introduced in 1936 and used until 1948 (which had a reduced penalty for a loss by 2–1 decision). Each round featured all wrestlers pairing off and wrestling one bout (with one wrestler having a bye if there were an odd number). The loser received 3 points. The winner received 1 point if the win was by decision and 0 points if the win was by fall. At the end of each round, any wrestler with at least 5 points was eliminated. This elimination continued until the medal rounds, which began when 3 wrestlers remained. These 3 wrestlers each faced each other in a round-robin medal round (with earlier results counting, if any had wrestled another before); record within the medal round determined medals, with bad points breaking ties.

== Results ==
=== Round 1 ===
Bouts

Winner	Nation	Victory Type	Loser	Nation
Viking Palm	Sweden	Decision, 3–0	Kevin Coote	Australia
Henry Wittenberg	United States	Fall	Rodolfo Padron	Venezuela
Willy Lardon	Switzerland	Fall	Bob Steckle	Canada
Jan Theron	South Africa	Decision, 2–1	Shrirang Jadhav	India
August Englas	Soviet Union	Decision, 3–0	Adil Atan	Turkey
Max Leichter	Germany	Decision, 3–0	Paavo Sepponen	Finland
Abbas Zandi	Iran	Bye	N/A	N/A

Points

Rank	Wrestler	Nation	Start	Earned	Total
1	Willy Lardon	Switzerland	0	0	0
1	Henry Wittenberg	United States	0	0	0
1	Abbas Zandi	Iran	0	0	0
4	August Englas	Soviet Union	0	1	1
4	Max Leichter	Germany	0	1	1
4	Viking Palm	Sweden	0	1	1
4	Jan Theron	South Africa	0	1	1
8	Adil Atan	Turkey	0	3	3
8	Kevin Coote	Australia	0	3	3
8	Shrirang Jadhav	India	0	3	3
8	Rodolfo Padron	Venezuela	0	3	3
8	Paavo Sepponen	Finland	0	3	3
8	Bob Steckle	Canada	0	3	3

=== Round 2 ===
Lardon withdrew after his bout.

Bouts

Winner	Nation	Victory Type	Loser	Nation
Abbas Zandi	Iran	Decision, 3–0	Kevin Coote	Australia
Viking Palm	Sweden	Fall	Rodolfo Padron	Venezuela
Henry Wittenberg	United States	Fall	Willy Lardon	Switzerland
Jan Theron	South Africa	Decision, 3–0	Bob Steckle	Canada
August Englas	Soviet Union	Fall	Shrirang Jadhav	India
Adil Atan	Turkey	Fall	Max Leichter	Germany
Paavo Sepponen	Finland	Bye	N/A	N/A

Points

Rank	Wrestler	Nation	Start	Earned	Total
1	Henry Wittenberg	United States	0	0	0
2	August Englas	Soviet Union	1	0	1
2	Viking Palm	Sweden	1	0	1
2	Abbas Zandi	Iran	0	1	1
5	Jan Theron	South Africa	1	1	2
6	Adil Atan	Turkey	3	0	3
6	Paavo Sepponen	Finland	3	0	3
8	Max Leichter	Germany	1	3	4
9	Willy Lardon	Switzerland	0	3	3*
10	Kevin Coote	Australia	3	3	6
10	Shrirang Jadhav	India	3	3	6
10	Rodolfo Padron	Venezuela	3	3	6
10	Bob Steckle	Canada	3	3	6

=== Round 3 ===
Bouts

Winner	Nation	Victory Type	Loser	Nation
Abbas Zandi	Iran	Decision, 3–0	Paavo Sepponen	Finland
Viking Palm	Sweden	Decision, 3–0	Henry Wittenberg	United States
Adil Atan	Turkey	Fall	Jan Theron	South Africa
August Englas	Soviet Union	Fall	Max Leichter	Germany

Points

Rank	Wrestler	Nation	Start	Earned	Total
1	August Englas	Soviet Union	1	0	1
2	Viking Palm	Sweden	1	1	2
2	Abbas Zandi	Iran	1	1	2
4	Adil Atan	Turkey	3	0	3
4	Henry Wittenberg	United States	0	3	3
6	Jan Theron	South Africa	2	3	5
7	Paavo Sepponen	Finland	3	3	6
8	Max Leichter	Germany	4	3	7

=== Round 4 ===
Bouts

Winner	Nation	Victory Type	Loser	Nation
Viking Palm	Sweden	Decision, 2–1	Abbas Zandi	Iran
Henry Wittenberg	United States	Decision, 3–0	August Englas	Soviet Union
Adil Atan	Turkey	Bye	N/A	N/A

Points

Rank	Wrestler	Nation	Start	Earned	Total
1	Adil Atan	Turkey	3	0	3
1	Viking Palm	Sweden	2	1	3
3	August Englas	Soviet Union	1	3	4
4	Henry Wittenberg	United States	3	1	4
5	Abbas Zandi	Iran	2	3	5

=== Round 5 ===
Bouts

Winner	Nation	Victory Type	Loser	Nation
Henry Wittenberg	United States	Fall	Adil Atan	Turkey
Viking Palm	Sweden	Decision, 2–1	August Englas	Soviet Union

Points

Rank	Wrestler	Nation	Start	Earned	Total
1	Viking Palm	Sweden	3	1	4
1	Henry Wittenberg	United States	4	0	4
3	Adil Atan	Turkey	3	3	6
4	August Englas	Soviet Union	4	3	7

=== Medal rounds ===
Palm's victory over Wittenberg in round 3 and Wittenberg's victory over Atan in round 5 counted for the medal round. The only bout left for the round therefore was Palm against Atan, with Wittenberg a spectator—who had to hope for an Atan victory to create a three-way tie at 1–1 which Wittenberg would win on bad points to take gold. Palm was able to defeat Atan in a split decision, however, and the Swede thereby won the gold medal, having beaten both of the other medalists.

Bouts

Winner	Nation	Victory Type	Loser	Nation
Viking Palm	Sweden	Decision, 2–1	Adil Atan	Turkey

Points

Rank	Wrestler	Nation	Wins	Losses	Start	Earned	Total
1st place, gold medalist(s)	Viking Palm	Sweden	2	0	4	1	5
2nd place, silver medalist(s)	Henry Wittenberg	United States	1	1	4	0	4
3rd place, bronze medalist(s)	Adil Atan	Turkey	0	2	6	3	9
