= August Englas =

Estonian wrestler (1925–2017)

Personal information
- Born: 15 January 1925 Pühajärve Parish, Estonia
- Died: 21 March 2017 (aged 92)
Medal record
Representing Soviet Union
Men's Greco-Roman wrestling
World Championships
Gold medal – first place	1953 Naples	87 kg
Men's freestyle wrestling
World Championships
Gold medal – first place	1954 Tokyo	87 kg

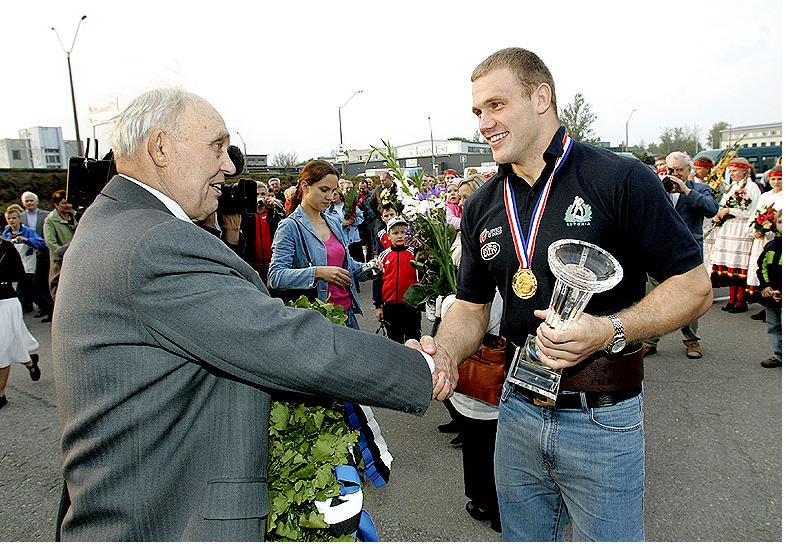
August Englas and Heiki Nabi

August Englas (15 January 1925 – 21 March 2017) was an Estonian wrestler who competed for the Soviet Union.

Englas was born in Pühajärve Parish (now part of Otepää Parish). In the 1952 Summer Olympics, after defeating Adil Atan, Shrirang Jadhav and Max Leichter, and losing against Henry Wittenberg and Viking Palm, he took fourth place. He won the gold medal at the 1953 and 1954 World Championships.

== Awards ==
- Order of the Red Banner of Labour
- Order of the White Star Fourth Class (1999)
- Order of the Estonian Olympic Committee (2008)
