= Wrestling at the 1956 Summer Olympics – Men's freestyle featherweight =

Wrestling at the Olympics

Men's freestyle featherweight at the Games of the XVI Olympiad
- Venue: Royal Exhibition Building
- Dates: 28 November–1 December 1956
- Competitors: 13 from 13 nations

Medalists
1st place, gold medalist(s)		Shozo Sasahara	Japan
2nd place, silver medalist(s)		Jef Mewis	Belgium
3rd place, bronze medalist(s)		Erkki Penttilä	Finland

The men's freestyle featherweight competition at the 1956 Summer Olympics in Melbourne took place from 28 November to 1 December at the Royal Exhibition Building. Nations were limited to one competitor. Featherweight was the third-lightest category, including wrestlers weighing 57 to 62 kilograms (125.7 to 136.7 lb).

== Competition format ==
This freestyle wrestling competition continued to use the "bad points" elimination system introduced at the 1928 Summer Olympics for Greco-Roman and at the 1932 Summer Olympics for freestyle wrestling, as modified in 1952 (adding medal rounds and making all losses worth 3 points—from 1936 to 1948 losses by split decision only cost 2). Each round featured all wrestlers pairing off and wrestling one bout (with one wrestler having a bye if there were an odd number). The loser received 3 points. The winner received 1 point if the win was by decision and 0 points if the win was by fall. At the end of each round, any wrestler with at least 5 points was eliminated. This elimination continued until the medal rounds, which began when 3 wrestlers remained. These 3 wrestlers each faced each other in a round-robin medal round (with earlier results counting, if any had wrestled another before); record within the medal round determined medals, with bad points breaking ties.

== Results ==
=== Round 1 ===
Bouts

Winner	Nation	Victory Type	Loser	Nation
Shozo Sasahara	Japan	Decision, 3–0	Muhammad Nazir	Pakistan
Bayram Şit	Turkey	Fall	John Elliott	Australia
Myron Roderick	United States	Decision, 3–0	Bálint Galántai	Hungary
Nasser Givehchi	Iran	Decision, 3–0	Abe Geldenhuys	South Africa
Erkki Penttilä	Finland	Fall	Herbie Hall	Great Britain
Jef Mewis	Belgium	Decision, 3–0	Ram Sarup	India
Linar Salimullin	Soviet Union	Bye	N/A	N/A

Points

Rank	Wrestler	Nation	Start	Earned	Total
1	Erkki Penttilä	Finland	0	0	0
1	Linar Salimullin	Soviet Union	0	0	0
1	Bayram Şit	Turkey	0	0	0
4	Nasser Givehchi	Iran	0	1	1
4	Jef Mewis	Belgium	0	1	1
4	Myron Roderick	United States	0	1	1
4	Shozo Sasahara	Japan	0	1	1
8	John Elliott	Australia	0	3	3
8	Bálint Galántai	Hungary	0	3	3
8	Abe Geldenhuys	South Africa	0	3	3
8	Herbie Hall	Great Britain	0	3	3
8	Muhammad Nazir	Pakistan	0	3	3
8	Ram Sarup	India	0	3	3

=== Round 2 ===
Bouts

Winner	Nation	Victory Type	Loser	Nation
Shozo Sasahara	Japan	Decision, 2–1	Linar Salimullin	Soviet Union
Bayram Şit	Turkey	Decision, 2–1	Muhammad Nazir	Pakistan
Myron Roderick	United States	Fall	John Elliott	Australia
Abe Geldenhuys	South Africa	Decision, 3–0	Bálint Galántai	Hungary
Nasser Givehchi	Iran	Fall	Herbie Hall	Great Britain
Jef Mewis	Belgium	Decision, 3–0	Erkki Penttilä	Finland
Ram Sarup	India	Bye	N/A	N/A

Points

Rank	Wrestler	Nation	Start	Earned	Total
1	Nasser Givehchi	Iran	1	0	1
1	Myron Roderick	United States	1	0	1
1	Bayram Şit	Turkey	0	1	1
4	Jef Mewis	Belgium	1	1	2
4	Shozo Sasahara	Japan	1	1	2
6	Erkki Penttilä	Finland	0	3	3
6	Linar Salimullin	Soviet Union	0	3	3
6	Ram Sarup	India	3	0	3
9	Abe Geldenhuys	South Africa	3	1	4
10	John Elliott	Australia	3	3	6
10	Bálint Galántai	Hungary	3	3	6
10	Herbie Hall	Great Britain	3	3	6
10	Muhammad Nazir	Pakistan	3	3	6

=== Round 3 ===
Bouts

Winner	Nation	Victory Type	Loser	Nation
Linar Salimullin	Soviet Union	Decision, 3–0	Ram Sarup	India
Shozo Sasahara	Japan	Decision, 3–0	Bayram Şit	Turkey
Myron Roderick	United States	Decision, 3–0	Abe Geldenhuys	South Africa
Erkki Penttilä	Finland	Decision, 2–1	Nasser Givehchi	Iran
Jef Mewis	Belgium	Bye	N/A	N/A

Points

Rank	Wrestler	Nation	Start	Earned	Total
1	Jef Mewis	Belgium	2	0	2
1	Myron Roderick	United States	1	1	2
3	Shozo Sasahara	Japan	2	1	3
4	Nasser Givehchi	Iran	1	3	4
4	Erkki Penttilä	Finland	3	1	4
4	Linar Salimullin	Soviet Union	3	1	4
4	Bayram Şit	Turkey	1	3	4
8	Ram Sarup	India	3	3	6
9	Abe Geldenhuys	South Africa	4	3	7

=== Round 4 ===
Bouts

Winner	Nation	Victory Type	Loser	Nation
Jef Mewis	Belgium	Decision, 3–0	Linar Salimullin	Soviet Union
Shozo Sasahara	Japan	Decision, 3–0	Myron Roderick	United States
Bayram Şit	Turkey	Decision, 3–0	Nasser Givehchi	Iran
Erkki Penttilä	Finland	Bye	N/A	N/A

Points

Rank	Wrestler	Nation	Start	Earned	Total
1	Jef Mewis	Belgium	2	1	3
2	Erkki Penttilä	Finland	4	0	4
2	Shozo Sasahara	Japan	3	1	4
4	Myron Roderick	United States	2	3	5
4	Bayram Şit	Turkey	4	1	5
6	Nasser Givehchi	Iran	4	3	7
6	Linar Salimullin	Soviet Union	4	3	7

=== Medal rounds ===
Mewis's round 2 victory over Penttilä counted for the medal rounds. Sasahara received a walkover victory over Penttilä, then defeated Mewis by decision to go 2–0 against the other medalists and win the gold medal. Mewis's 1–1 record against Sasahara and Penttilä gave the Belgian silver. Penttilä finished with bronze, 0–2 against the other two medalists.

Bouts

Winner	Nation	Victory Type	Loser	Nation
Shozo Sasahara	Japan	Walkover	Erkki Penttilä	Finland
Shozo Sasahara	Japan	Decision	Jef Mewis	Belgium

Points

Rank	Wrestler	Nation	Wins	Losses
1st place, gold medalist(s)	Shozo Sasahara	Japan	2	0
2nd place, silver medalist(s)	Jef Mewis	Belgium	1	1
3rd place, bronze medalist(s)	Erkki Penttilä	Finland	0	2
