= Ahmad Vafadar =

Iranian wrestler

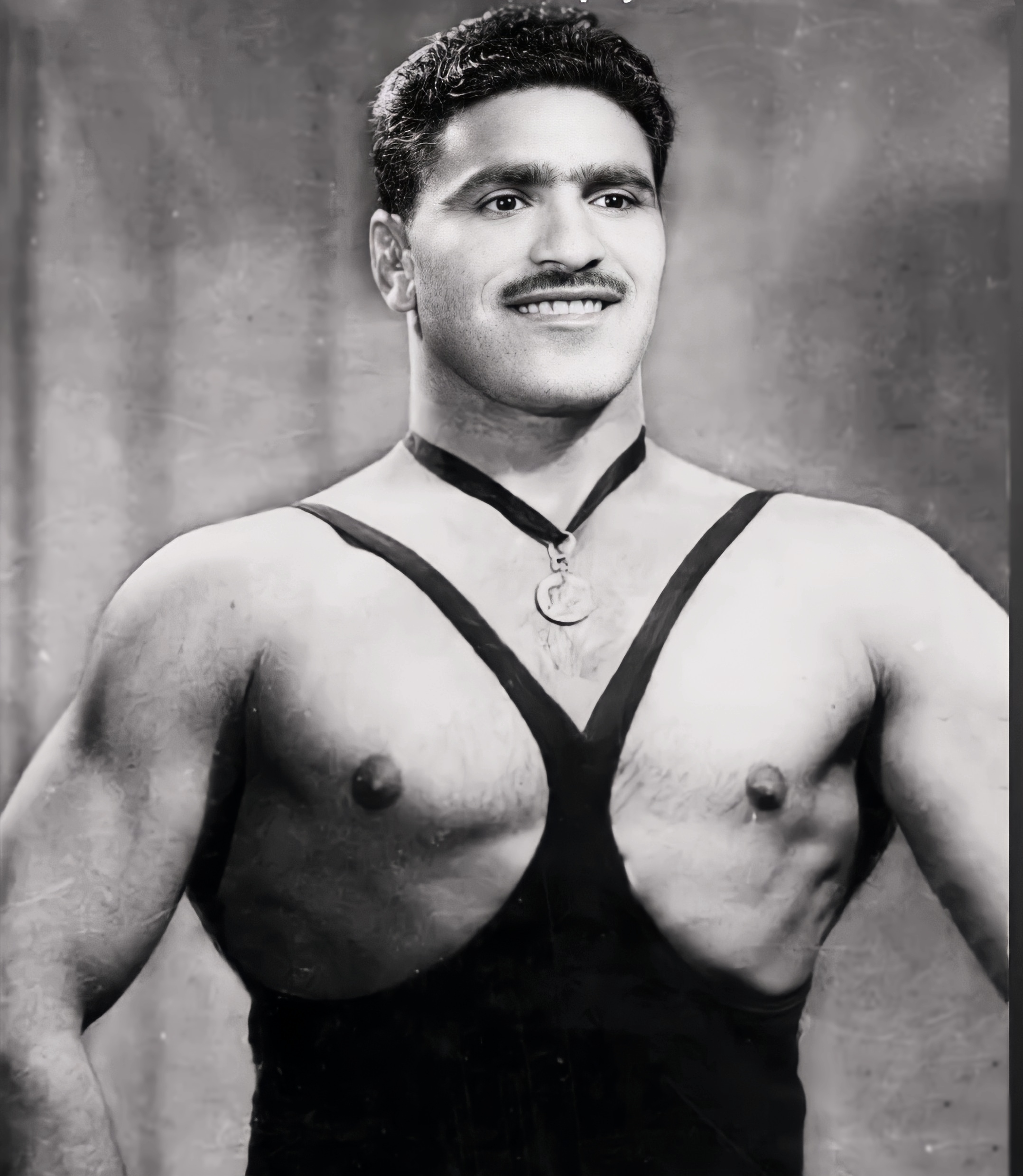

Personal information
- Born: 23 January 1927 Quchan, Imperial State of Persia
- Died: 22 February 2005 (aged 78) Mashhad, Iran
- Height: 1.75 m (5 ft 9 in)

Sport
- Sport: Freestyle wrestling, koshti pahlavāni

Ahmad Vafadar (Persian: احمد وفادار, 23 January 1927 – 22 February 2005) was an Iranian heavyweight freestyle wrestler who competed at the 1951 World Wrestling Championships, 1952 Summer Olympics and the 1954 World Wrestling Championships. He was the Pahelwan of Iran for three years, having won the national tournament between 1950 and 1953.
