= Gholamreza Takhti =

Iranian wrestler (1930–1968)

Gholam Reza Takhti
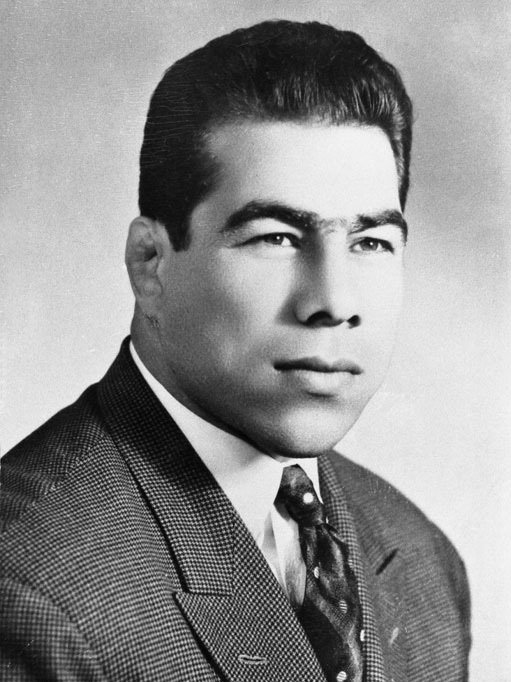
- Takhti in the 1950s

Personal information
- Nickname: Jahān Pahlevān
- Born: Gholamreza Takhti; 27 August 1930 Tehran, Imperial State of Iran
- Died: 7 January 1968 (aged 37) Tehran, Imperial State of Iran
- Resting place: Ibn Babawayh Cemetery, Rey, Iran
- Years active: 1950–1966
- Height: 1.80 m (5 ft 11 in)
- Weight: 97 kg (214 lb)

Sport
- Sport: Wrestling
- Events: Freestyle, koshti pahlavāni
- Team: Poulad Club

Achievements and titles
- Olympic finals: 1952 Summer Olympics: Freestyle 79kg – Silver; 1956 Summer Olympics: Freestyle 87kg – Gold; 1960 Summer Olympics: Freestyle 87kg – Silver; 1964 Summer Olympics: Freestyle 97kg – 4th
- World finals: 1951 World Championships: Freestyle 79kg – Silver; 1954 World Championships: Freestyle 87kg – 5th 1959 World Championships: Freestyle 87kg – Gold; 1961 World Championships: Freestyle 87kg – Gold; 1962 World Championships: Freestyle 97kg – Silver
- Regional finals: 1958 Asian Games: Freestyle 87kg – Gold
- National finals: Pahlevan of Iran (3): 1336, 1337, 1338
Medal record
Representing Iran
Men's freestyle wrestling
Olympic Games
Gold medal – first place	1956 Melbourne	87 kg
Silver medal – second place	1952 Helsinki	79 kg
Silver medal – second place	1960 Rome	87 kg
World Championships
Gold medal – first place	1959 Tehran	87 kg
Gold medal – first place	1961 Yokohama	87 kg
Silver medal – second place	1951 Helsinki	79 kg
Silver medal – second place	1962 Toledo	97 kg
Asian Games
Gold medal – first place	1958 Tokyo	87 kg
World Cup
Silver medal – second place	1958 Sofia	87 kg

Gholamreza Takhti (Azerbaijani: Qulamrza Təxti; South Azerbaijani: غلامرضا تختی; Persian: غلامرضا تختی; 27 August 1930 – 7 January 1968) was an Iranian freestyle wrestler and a practitioner of varzesh-e bastani (traditional Persian sport). He was a gold medalist at the 1956 Summer Olympics, 1958 Asian Games, 1959 World Championships, and 1961 World Championships, as well as a three-time Pahlevan of Iran.

Popularly nicknamed Jahân Pahlevân (Persian: جهان پهلوان, lit. 'World Champion') because of his chivalrous behavior and sportsmanship (Javanmardi in Iranian culture), he was the most popular athlete of Iran in the 20th century, although dozens of Iranian athletes have won more international medals than he did. Takhti is still considered a hero to many Iranians. He is listed in the UWW Hall of Fame.

== Early life ==
On 27 August 1930, Takhti, the youngest child of a poor Azerbaijani family from Hamadan, was born in the Khaniabad neighbourhood, notable for its large population of Hamadan Azeris, of south Tehran‌. At the age of 15, he entered Poulad Club in southern Tehran and began training in wrestling. He soon left Tehran to become a manual laborer in Masjed Soleyman. When he was called up for military service, his potential in wrestling was discovered and he began to train seriously after he was recruited as an Iran Railways employee in 1948.

== Career ==
Takhti won his first Iranian championship in 1950. The following year on his first trip abroad, he won a silver medal at the world freestyle championships in Helsinki - the first international medal ever gained by an Iranian wrestler. One year later, he won another silver medal, again in Helsinki, this time in the 1952 Summer Olympic Games.

The subsequent highlights of his career were the gold medals in the 1956 Summer Olympic Games, the 1959 World Championships (Tehran), and the 1961 World Championships (Yokohama). Takhti won a silver, at the 1960 Summer Olympic Games, taking his final Olympic haul to one gold and two silver medals. He finished fourth in the 1964 Summer Olympic Games.

Takhti started as a middleweight in the 79 kg and 87 kg categories, as he got older, he decided to move up in weight and competed at, 97 kg, for the 1964 Summer Olympic Games. He was unable to win a medal and finished in 4th place.

=== Character and personality ===
Takhti tended to act fairly when competing against rivals during his career, something which originated from traditional values of Zurkhaneh, a kind of heroic behaviour that epitomizes chivalrous qualities known as Javanmardi.

For instance, he once had a match with Soviet wrestler Aleksandr Medved who had an injured right knee. When Takhti found out that Medved was injured, he avoided touching the injured leg and tried to attack the other leg instead. He lost the match, but showed that he valued honourable behavior more than reaching victory.

Another example of his character comes from a match in Moscow. After defeating the then-world champion Anatoly Albul, Takhti saw the sorrow on the face of Albul's mother. Takhti went to her and said, "I'm sorry about the result, but your son is a great wrestler". She smiled and kissed him.

== Social and political activisms ==
Takhti was known for his anti-regime views. He was a pro-Mossadegh activist and member of Second National Front and his death sparked a number of anti-Shah demonstrations.

In 1962, an earthquake occurred in Buin Zahra in western Iran, killing over 12,000 people. Takhti was deeply touched by the suffering. Already one of Iran's biggest stars, he began to walk one of the main avenues of Tehran, helping out the victims and asking for assistance. He inspired others to follow in his footsteps, and thousands gave in to alleviate the suffering.

== Death and legacy ==
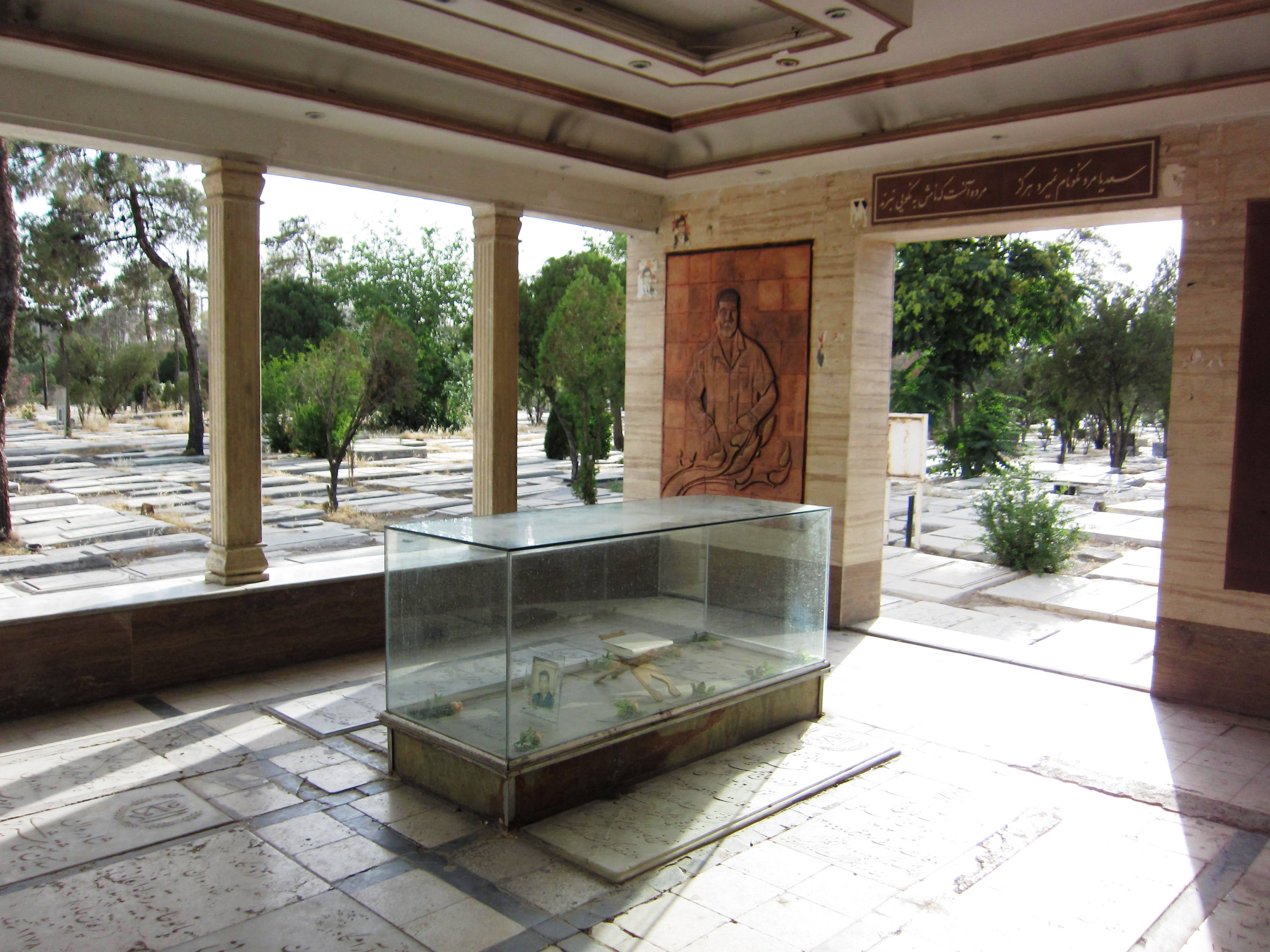
Takhti's tomb, Ibn Babawayh Cemetery

Takhti was found dead in his hotel room on 7 January 1968. The Iranian government officially proclaimed his death a suicide. However, some claim that he was murdered because of his political activities against the Pahlavi regime, accusing SAVAK, the Iranian intelligence agency at that time. Because he was a national hero, his funeral drew thousands of mourners after being organized by Hossein Towfigh, editor-in-chief of the popular Towfigh Magazine. According to reports, at least 7 people committed suicide due to their sadness over the news of Takhti's death. Towfigh issued a special edition of their popular weekly magazine on 14 January 1968, where they caricatured Takhti with angel wings flying high above the throngs of Iranian mourners at his own funeral with a caption that read "Don't cry for me, cry for yourselves." Towfigh Magazine was shut down by the Shah for several months after printing this caricature.

Takhti is buried at Ibn Babawayh Cemetery in Southern Tehran, near Ray, where he is commemorated every year by his fans.

Takhti struggled with depression particularly regarding problems with his wife. Two days before his death Takhti created his will transferring the guardianship of his son to a colleague and instructions on what to do with his properties.

Takhti was survived by his wife and son, Babak Takhti, an author and translator. Babak has heavily criticized the rumors that his father was killed and confirmed that his father took his life. The movie Takhti, begun by Ali Hatami and finished by Behrouz Afkhami, examined some of the theories about Takhti's death.

== In film ==
- Takhti (1997)
- Gholamreza Takhti (2019)
- The Sheik (2014) (documentary, shown in archive footage)
