= Turkkila =

Turkkila is a Finnish surname. Notable people with the surname include:

- Juulia Turkkila (born 1994), Finnish figure skater
- Niilo Turkkila (1921–2012), Finnish wrestler
