= Foumani =

Foumani is a surname. Notable people with the surname include:

- Kioumars Saberi Foumani (1941–2004), Iranian satirist, writer, and teacher
- Mohammad-Taqi Bahjat Foumani (1913–2009), Iranian Shia Marja
