= Risaburō =

- Gender: Male

Origin
- Origin: Japanese
- Meaning: Different meanings depending on the kanji used

Risaburō, Risaburo or Risaburou (written: 利三郎) is a masculine Japanese given name. It can also be transliterated as Rizaburo. Notable people with the name include:

- Risaburo Tominaga (富永 利三郎; born 1930), Japanese sport wrestler
- Rizaburo Toyoda (豊田 利三郎; 1884–1952), Japanese businessman
