= Shozo Sasahara =

Japanese freestyle wrestler (1929–2023)

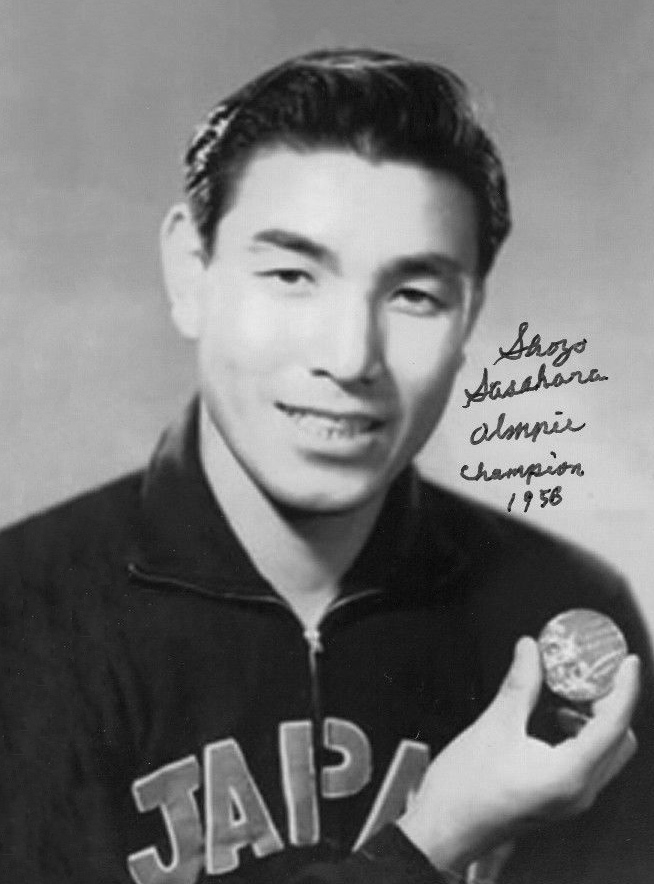
- Photograph of Sasahara at the 1956 Olympics, signed by him

Personal information
- Born: July 28, 1929 Yamagata, Japan
- Died: March 5, 2023 (aged 93)
- Education: Chuo University

Sport
- Sport: Freestyle wrestling
Medal record
Representing Japan
Olympic Games
Gold medal – first place	1956 Melbourne	Featherweight
World Wrestling Championships
Gold medal – first place	1954 Tokyo	62 kg

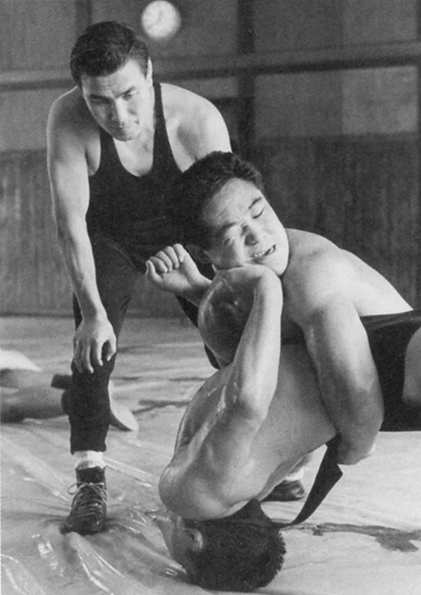
Shozo Sasahara (left) and Osamu Watanabe (top-right)

Shozo Sasahara (笹原 正三, Sasahara Shōzō; July 28, 1929 – March 5, 2023) was a Japanese freestyle wrestler who won a world title in 1954 and an Olympics gold medal in 1956. He was the flag bearer for Japan at the 1956 Games. During his career Sasahara won approximately 200 bouts. After retiring from competitions he worked as a national coach. His trainees included Osamu Watanabe.

Sasahara is credited with having designed "bound tennis" in 1980, which is a form of tennis played on a small-sized court. In 1981 he became the founding president of the Japan Bound Tennis Association. Between 1989 and 2003 Sasahara was president of Japan Wrestling Association. For many years he also served as Vice-President of United World Wrestling (FILA), and was later named its Honorary Vice-president. In 2006 he was inducted to the FILA International Wrestling Hall of Fame.

Sasahara died on March 5, 2023, at the age of 93.

== Books by Sasahara ==
- Scientific Approach to Wrestling. Chuo University Co-operation Press. 1960.
- Fundamentals of Scientific Wrestling. Taylor & Francis. 1968. ISBN 0800208013.
- FILA Wrestling Album: Free Style. FILA, Fédération internationale de lutte amateur. 1988.
