= Erkki Penttilä =

Finnish wrestler (1932–2005)

Medal record

Men's freestyle wrestling

Representing Finland

Olympic Games
Bronze medal – third place	1956 Melbourne	Featherweight

Erkki Penttilä (14 June 1932 – 19 April 2005) was a Finnish wrestler and Olympic medalist. He competed at the 1956 Summer Olympics in Melbourne where he received a bronze medal in freestyle wrestling.
