= Bálint Galántai =

Hungarian wrestler (1932–2024)

Personal information
- Nationality: Hungarian
- Born: 14 February 1932 Vary, Czechoslovakia
- Died: 30 April 2024 (aged 92) Brisbane, Australia

Sport
- Sport: Wrestling

Bálint Galántai (14 February 1932 – 30 April 2024) was a Hungarian wrestler. He competed in the men's freestyle featherweight at the 1956 Summer Olympics. Galántai died in Brisbane, Australia, on 30 April 2024, at the age of 92.
