= 1951 World Wrestling Championships =

- Host city: Helsinki, Finland
- Dates: 26–29 April 1951

Champions
- Freestyle: Turkey

The 1951 World Freestyle Wrestling Championship were held in Helsinki, Finland from 26 to 29 April 1951. That was the first ever World Championships in freestyle wrestling.

== Medal table ==
Rank	Nation	Gold	Silver	Bronze	Total
1	Turkey	6	0	1	7
2	Sweden	2	1	3	6
3	Finland	0	4	0	4
4	Iran	0	2	2	4
5	Italy	0	1	1	2
6	West Germany	0	0	1	1
Totals (6 entries)		8	8	8	24

== Team ranking ==
Rank	Men's freestyle	
Rank	Team	Points
1	Turkey	41
2	Sweden	35
3	Finland	27
4	Iran	25

== Medal summary ==
Event	Gold	Silver	Bronze
Flyweight; 52 kg	Ali Yücel; Turkey	Mahmoud Mollaghasemi; Iran	Bengt Johansson; Sweden
Bantamweight; 57 kg	Nasuh Akar; Turkey	Niilo Turkkila; Finland	Mehdi Yaghoubi; Iran
Featherweight; 62 kg	Nurettin Zafer; Turkey	Ilmari Ruikka; Finland	Henry Holmberg; Sweden
Lightweight; 67 kg	Olle Anderberg; Sweden	Garibaldo Nizzola; Italy	İbrahim Zengin; Turkey
Welterweight; 73 kg	Celal Atik; Turkey	Aleksanteri Keisala; Finland	Abdollah Mojtabavi; Iran
Middleweight; 79 kg	Haydar Zafer; Turkey	Gholamreza Takhti; Iran	Göte Ekström; Sweden
Light heavyweight 87 kg	Yaşar Doğu; Turkey	Viking Palm; Sweden	Max Leichter; West Germany
Heavyweight +87 kg	Bertil Antonsson; Sweden	Pauli Riihimäki; Finland	Natale Vecchi; Italy
