= Rodolfo Padron =

Venezuelan wrestler (1927–2007)

Personal information
- Nationality: Venezuelan
- Born: 5 November 1927 Havana, Cuba
- Died: 29 May 2007 (aged 79) Caracas, Venezuela

Sport
- Sport: Wrestling

Rodolfo Padron (5 November 1927 – 29 May 2007) was a Venezuelan wrestler. He competed in the men's freestyle light heavyweight at the 1952 Summer Olympics.
