= Próspero Mammana =

Argentine wrestler (1931–2007)

Personal information
- Nationality: Argentine
- Born: 2 May 1931
- Died: 2 August 2007 (aged 76)

Sport
- Sport: Wrestling

Próspero Mammana (2 May 1931 – 2 August 2007) was an Argentine wrestler. He competed in the men's freestyle featherweight at the 1952 Summer Olympics.
