= Ram Sarup =

Indian wrestler

Personal information
- Nationality: Indian
- Born: c. 1936

Sport
- Sport: Wrestling

Ram Sarup is an Indian wrestler. He competed in the men's freestyle featherweight at the 1956 Summer Olympics.
