= Géza Hoffmann =

Hungarian wrestler (1929–2005)

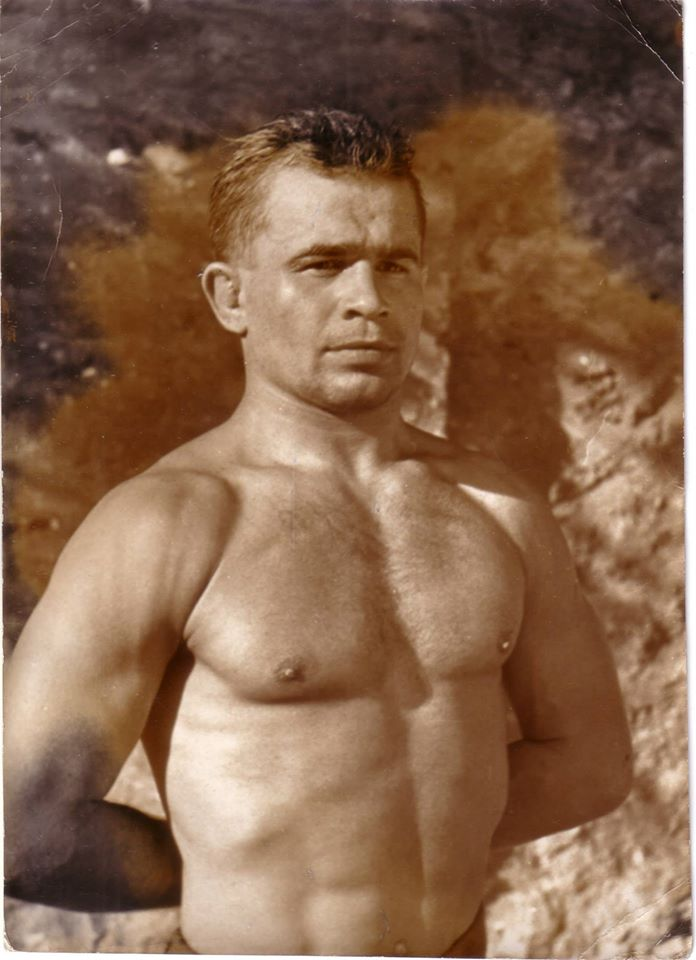
- Géza Hoffmann

Personal information
- Nationality: Hungarian
- Born: 26 February 1929 Hódmezővásárhely, Hungary
- Died: 18 April 2005 (aged 76) Budapest, Hungary

Sport
- Sport: Wrestling

Géza Hoffmann (26 February 1929 – 18 April 2005) was a Hungarian wrestler. He competed in the men's freestyle featherweight at the 1952 Summer Olympics.
