= Antonio Randi =

Italian wrestler (1921–1998)

Personal information
- Nationality: Italian
- Born: 11 March 1921 Faenza, Italy
- Died: 6 April 1998 Faenza, Italy

Sport
- Sport: Wrestling
Medal record
Men's Greco-Roman wrestling
Representing Italy
Mediterranean Games
Gold medal – first place	1951 Alexandria	featherweight -62 kg

Antonio Randi (11 March 1921 – 6 April 1998) was an Italian wrestler. He competed in the men's freestyle featherweight at the 1952 Summer Olympics.
