= Pahlevan of Iran =

Annual National championships wrestling of Iran

Pahlevan of Iran (Persian: پهلوان ایران) is a national championship for pahlevani wrestling (koshti pahlavāni) held annually in Iran. Though the competition has ancient roots, its modern form began in 1944.

The champion earns the title of Pahlevan and the right to wear the Bazouband (championship armband). Described as "tangled up with the soul of Iranian peoples", the title is athletically and culturally prestigious in Iran. The Pahlevan armband was formerly awarded by the Shah of Iran and is now presented by the president of Iran. Many Pahlevan have gone on to win medals in international competition.

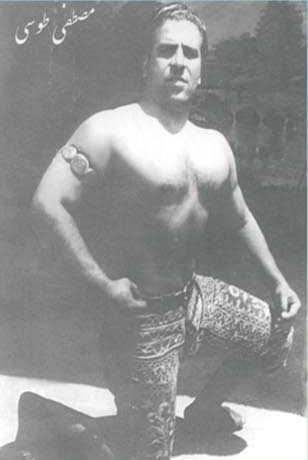
Mostafa Tousi, 3-times winner (1323–25)

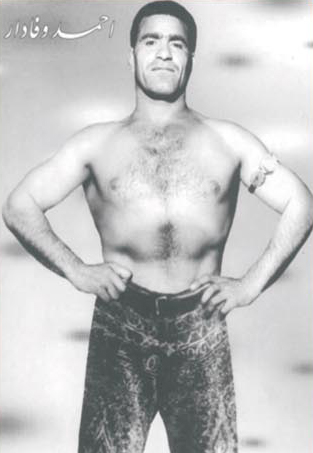
Ahmad Vafadar, 3-times winner (1329–31)

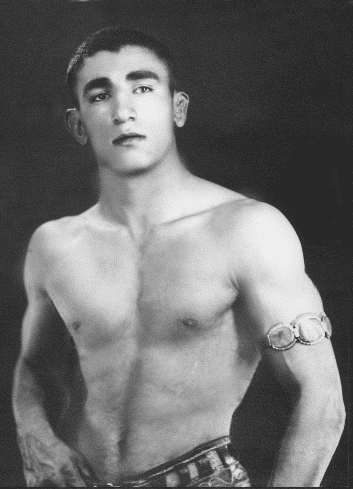
Abbas Zandi, with 4 titles (1328, 1332–35) and the youngest Pahlevan ever (18 years old)

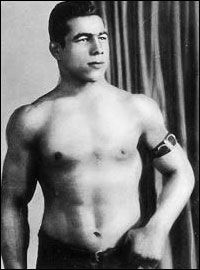
Gholamreza Takhti, 3-times winner (1336–38) was nicknamed Jahan Pahlevan

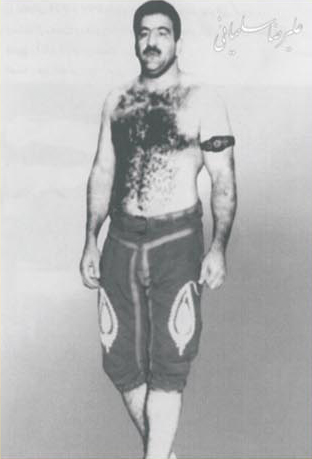
Alireza Soleimani has the most titles (6-times in total: 1358,1361–62, 1364–65, 1369) and is nicknamed Pahlevan Bashi

== Early Period (651–1450) ==
- Abu Moslem-e Khorasani
- Yaghub-e Layth
- Arslan Isra'il
- Babak khorramdin
- Asad Kermani
- Abdul Razagh Bashtini
- Shirdel Kohneh Savar
- Mahmood Kharazmi (Pahlavan-e Bozorg), was known as Pouriya-ye Vali
- Mohammad Abol-seyyed Abolkheyr
- Mahmood Malani
- Darvish Mohammad Khorassani

== Middle Period (1450–1795) ==
- Mirza Beyk-e Kashani
- Beyk-e Khorassani
- Hossein-e Kord
- Mir Baqer
- Jalal Yazdi
- Kabir-e Esfahani (Pahlavan-e Bozorg)
- Kalb Ali Aqa Jar
- Haji Yadollah Rezapoori

== Pre-Modern period (1795–present) ==
- Haj Seyyed Hasan Razaz (Pahlavan-e Bozorg), also known as Pahlavan Shoja'at
- Ali Asghar Yazdi
- Haj Reza Qoli Tehrani
- Mohammad Mazar Yazdi
- Shaban Siyah Qomi
- Yazdi Bozrog (Pahlavan-e Bozorg)
- Akbar Khorasani
- Abolqasem Qomi
- Hossein Golzar-e Kermanshahi
- Sadeq-e Qomi
- Mirza Hashem Akbarian Tefaghi, Moblsaz Esfahani
- Yazdi Kuchak (last official Pahlavan of Iran)
- Aziz Khan Rahmani /Kurdistani also known by Sanandaji(Gold Medal in 1945)

== List of Modern Pahlevans ==
Year		Pahlevan	Hometown
Gregorian	Iranian	Pahlevan	Hometown
1944–45	1323	Mostafa Tousi	Khorasan
1945–46	1324	Mostafa Tousi	Khorasan
1946–47	1325	Mostafa Tousi	Khorasan
1947–48	1326	Ziaeddin Mirghavami	Tehran
1948–49	1327	Abolghasem Sakhdari	Khorasan
1949–50	1328	Abbas Zandi	Tehran
1950–51	1329	Ahmad Vafadar	Khorasan
1951–52	1330	Ahmad Vafadar	Khorasan
1952–53	1331	Ahmad Vafadar	Khorasan
1953–54	1332	Abbas Zandi	Tehran
1954–55	1333	Abbas Zandi	Tehran
1955–56	1334	Abbas Zandi	Tehran
1956–57	1335	Not Held	
1957–58	1336	Gholamreza Takhti	Tehran
1957–58	1337	Gholamreza Takhti	Tehran
1957–58	1338	Gholamreza Takhti	Tehran
1958–59	1339	Not Held	
1959–60	1340	Yaghoub-Ali Shorouzi	Khorasan
1960–61	1341	Mansour Mehdizadeh	Tehran
1342–1343 Not Held
1965–66	1344	Mansour Mehdizadeh	Tehran
1345–1353 Not Held
1975–76	1354	Reza Soukhteh-Saraei	Mazandaran
1355–1357 Not Held
1979–80	1358	Alireza Soleimani	Tehran
1359–1360 Not Held
1982–83	1361	Alireza Soleimani	Tehran
1983–84	1362	Alireza Soleimani	Tehran
1984–85	1363	Mohammad Hassan Mohebbi	Kermanshah
1985–86	1364	Alireza Soleimani	Tehran
1986–87	1365	Alireza Soleimani	Tehran
1987–88	1366	Mohammad Reza Tupchi	Tehran
1988–89	1367	Mohammad Hassan Mohebbi	Kermanshah
1989–90	1368	Mohammad Reza Tupchi	Tehran
1990–91	1369	Alireza Soleimani	Tehran
1991–92	1370	Majid Ansari	
1992–93	1371	Ayyoub Bani-Nosrat	Azerbaijan
1993–94	1372	Ayyoub Bani-Nosrat	Azerbaijan
1994–95	1373	Mahmoud Miran	Tehran
1995–96	1374	Mahmoud Miran	Tehran
1996–97	1375	Mahmoud Miran	Tehran
1997–98	1376	Mahmoud Miran	Tehran
1998–99	1377	Hamid Ghashang	Khorasan
1999–00	1378	Hamid Ghashang	Khorasan
2000–01	1379	Mahmoud Mohammadi	Tehran
2001–02	1380	Amin Rashidlamir	Khorasan
2002–03	1381	Hamid Ghashang	Khorasan
2003–04	1382	Abdolreza Kargar	Khorasan
2004–05	1383	Abdolreza Kargar	Khorasan
2005–06	1384	Not Held	
2006–07	1385	Shahrokh Sedaghatizadeh	Mazandaran
2007–08	1386	Fardin Masoumi	Gilan
2008–09	1387	Amin Rashidlamir	Khorasan
2009–10	1388	Arash Mardani	Lorestan
2010–11	1389	Arash Mardani	Lorestan
2011–12	1390	Arash Mardani	Lorestan
2012–13	1391	Jaber Sadeghzadeh	Mazandaran
2013–14	1392	Ahmad Mirzapoor	Khorasan
2014–15	1393	Parviz Hadi	Azerbaijan
2015–16	1394	Jaber Sadeghzadeh	Mazandaran
2016–17	1395	Jaber Sadeghzadeh	Mazandaran

== In Shahnameh ==
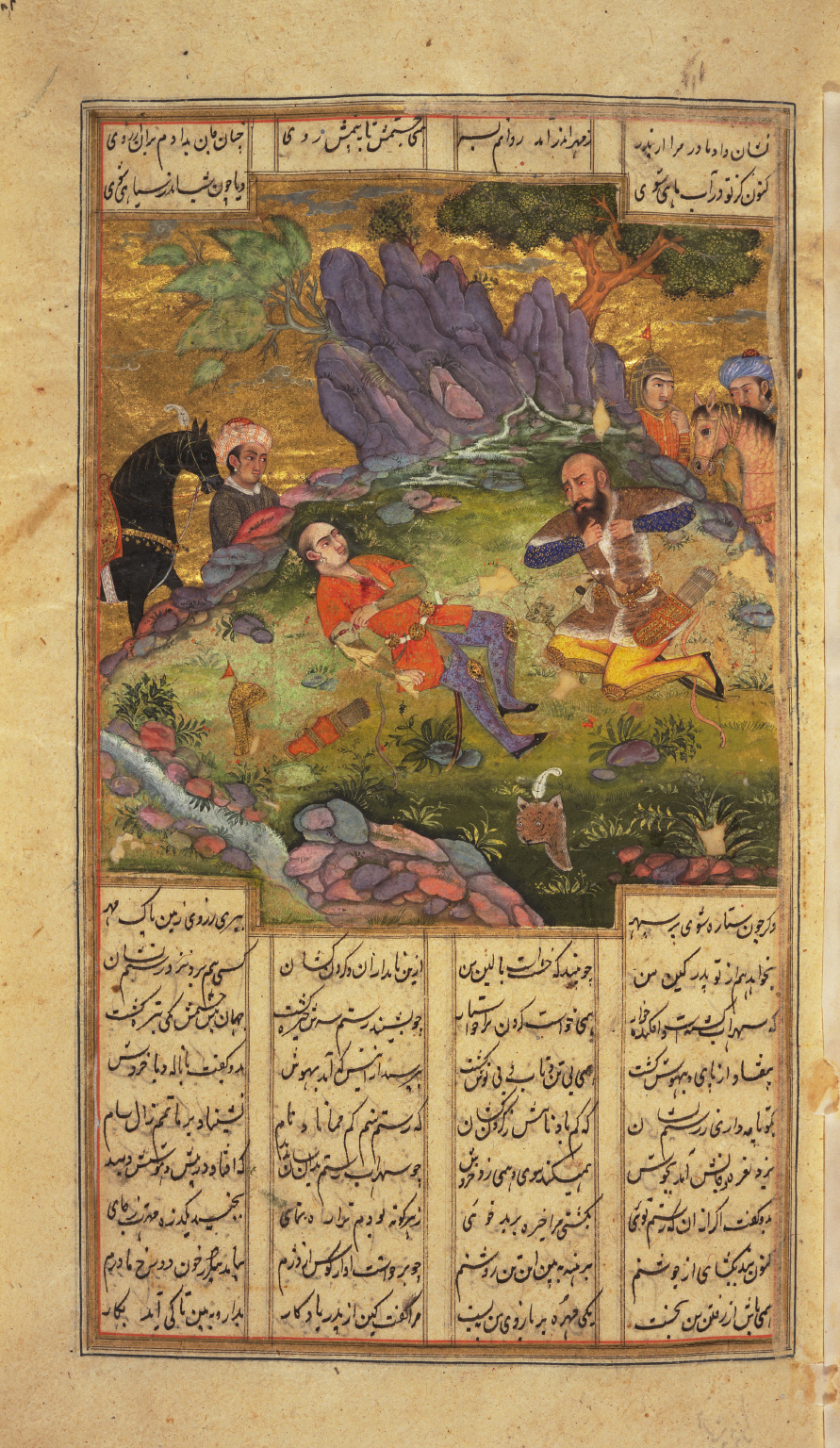
Rostam and Sohrab, two of the Pahlevan in Shahnameh

There are many Pahlevan in the epic poem Shahnameh. But the meaning of Pahlavan in Shahnameh is not only attributed to the wrestler. In Shahnameh, the word Pahlevan is referred to its ancient status as a title of honour granted by Shah of Persia. Pahlavan title was granted by the shah to the candidates whom beside their athletic manner, honesty, righteous were brave warrior; and the hero Rostam was given the title of Jahan Pahlavan (Persian: جهان پهلوان), a title higher than Pahlavan, which most recently is used for Gholamreza Takhti.
