= Ilmari Ruikka =

Finnish wrestler (1925–2013)

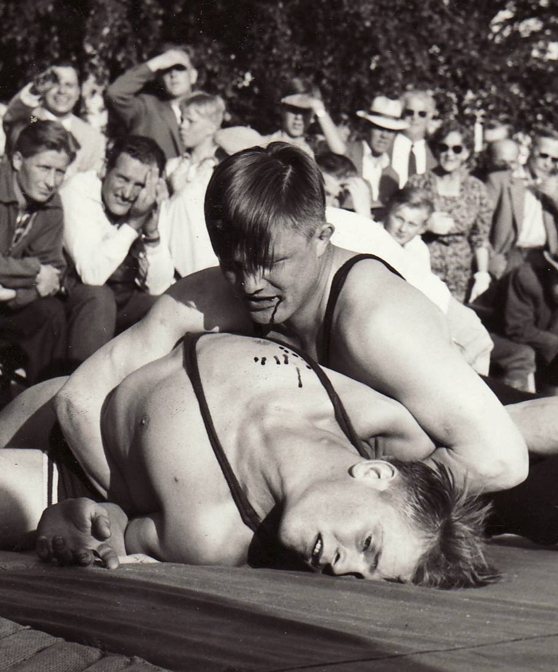
- Ruikka (top)

Personal information
- Born: 16 January 1925 Alatornio, Finland
- Died: 31 July 2013 (aged 88)

Sport
- Sport: Freestyle wrestling
- Club: TUL
Medal record
Men's wrestling (freestyle)
Representing Finland
World Championships
Silver medal – second place	1951 Helsinki	-62 kg

Ilmari Frans Ruikka (16 January 1925 – 31 July 2013) was a freestyle wrestler from Finland. In 1951 he won the national title and a silver medal at the world championships in the 62 kg division. Ruikka was a tram driver by profession. He was married and had one child, born in 1952. Besides wrestling he did cross-country skiing.
