= Hossein Towfigh =

Iranian Editor-in-Chief

- حسین توفیق
- Born: 20 July 1929; Tehran, Imperial State of Iran
- Died: 29 March 2017 (aged 87)
- Burial place: Behesht-E-Zahra, Namavaran, Tehran
- Education: Sorbonne University, Paris
- Occupations: Editor-in-Chief, Towfigh Magazine
- Years active: 1948–1972
- Movement: National Front

Hossein Towfigh (Persian: حسین توفیق; 20 July 1929 – 29 March 2017) was a pioneer of Iranian press freedom and Editor-in-Chief of Towfigh Magazine, the most popular satirical weekly publication in Iran that was active for nearly half a century.

== Biography ==
Hossein Towfigh was Editor-in-Chief of Towfigh Magazine, the highest circulating and most popular satirical weekly in Iranian history.

He attended the Dar al-Fonun high school in Tehran which was the oldest institute of higher education in Iran, established by the Royal Vizier to Naser al-Din Shah in 1851. He continued his education at the Faculty of Law of the University of Tehran. After graduating, he moved to Paris to pursue a doctorate in sociology at the Sorbonne University in Paris. He married Faranguis G. Taleghani, the great granddaughter of the former Commander in Chief of the Imperial Persian Army & four time prime minister Mohammad Vali Khan Khalatbari Tonekaboni.

After becoming Editor-in-Chief of Towfigh Magazine he remained its last Editor-in-Chief until its forced closure following heavy censorship by the regime of Shah Mohammad Reza Pahlavi in 1972. Towfigh did not work in the press after the magazine was banned in 1972, but was instrumental in founding the first Iranian constitution which emphasized press freedoms after the 1979 revolution, recommending his friend Dr. Hassan Habibi, who had also studied sociology and law in Paris and would go on to become the first Vice President and Minister of Justice, to be its main architect.

== Towfigh Magazine ==
Towfigh had chosen the language of satire to criticize the government, and the constant slogan of Towfigh remained: "The truth is bitter, but we sweeten it".

Towfigh Magazine was a satirical and critical weekly magazine that was active in Iran from 1923 to 1972. It included a monthly publication as well as several special edition books and remains the most collected and highly valued Iranian publication in history. The magazine's editorials with the signature of their mascot "Kaka Towfigh" included satirical articles on the desperate social situation such as rampant corruption, bureaucratic incompetence, poverty, inflation, unemployment, and daily injustices to the people. Its very strong and stinging criticisms were aimed at the ruling body and the parliamentarians of the majlis (parliament), National Council and the Senate.

The influence of this publication followed the reactions of the government and Towfigh came under severe censorship pressure, accompanied by repeated arrests. Hossein Towfigh, the last Editor-in-Chief of the publication, who was also the point of contact for government censors, the notorious SAVAK secret police, and prime ministers, described: "Every morning before printing, the government censors would enter the printing house with a ladder, see the pages of Towfigh and immediately censor us."

Publishing a political satire magazine during the totalitarian regime of the Shah was not an easy task. While Towfigh had to creatively navigate the politics of censorship, shutting down Towfigh did not always work in favor of the government. For example, Prime Minister Hassan Ali Mansur ordered Towfigh closed in 1964. This was not only an abuse of executive power, as such an order was only within the powers of the judiciary as a matter of law, but also caused hysteria among the public to the point that the people orally created harsh critical fictitious editorial cartoons and spread them among themselves, attributing them to Towfigh Magazine. Mansur realized that shutting down Towfigh created even greater insults on behalf of the average citizen towards himself and his government so he pleaded with Towfigh to reopen so he could at least censor their content. Realizing Mansur's strategy, Towfigh refused to reopen, but eventually agreed on the condition that they be censored less. Mansur agreed but was assassinated shortly thereafter by 21-year-old Mohammad Bokharaei, a member of Fada'iyan-e Islam.

Agents of the SAVAK secret police continued to surveil the brothers as well as their printing headquarters, often prohibiting Towfigh from being released just minutes before its weekly distribution, causing grave financial harm to the publication. When Shah Mohammad Reza Pahlavi summoned a meeting with Iran's journalists, Hossein Towfigh refused to attend, and had to be forcibly escorted by members of the SAVAK to the meeting for a photo op, whereby he asked to use the bathroom and escaped from a window to avoid the meeting. Nonetheless, the last Shah of Iran remained an ardent reader of Towfigh, but was under severe pressure after weekly critiques of his policies for years, as stated in the memoirs of his late Prime Minister Asadollah Alam. In his memoir published after his death, Alam writes "Despite it being the anniversary of the Prophet's birth and a national holiday, His Imperial Majesty (HIM) remained at his desk. During my audience he seemed depressed. Towfigh, a satirical paper, excellent in its heyday but suppressed recently, has now re-opened, much to HIM's disgust. He has severely reprimanded those he holds responsible." These pressures continued until Towfigh was banned indefinitely in 1972 by order of Shah Mohammad Reza Pahlavi via Amir Abbas Hoveyda, the then prime minister, after Towfigh refused to accept a large financial payment in exchange for full editorial control of the magazine by the Shah's government. Ironically, Prime Minister Hoveyda in interviews publicly encouraged criticism of all sorts while privately censoring the press.

Towfigh was published on Thursdays, and Kiumars Saberi and Imran Salahi were among its last writers although Towfigh Magazine had an average staff of 100 including Iraj Pezeshkzad who wrote the beloved Da'i Jan Napoleon. Kiumars Saberi went on to found Golagha Magazine after the 1979 revolution.

== Relationship with Prime Minister Mossadegh ==
Prime Minister Dr. Mohammad Mossadegh, Iran's only democratically elected prime minister during the reign of the Shah, had a close relationship with Hossein Towfigh and referred to Towfigh Magazine, to which he subscribed, as the "most respectable magazine in Iranian history". He was an active member of the National Front, which was an opposition political organization in Iran, founded by Dr. Mosaddegh in 1949. It was the oldest and largest pro-democracy group operating from inside Iran. He referred to Dr. Mossadegh's nationalization of Iran's oil industry as the most important contribution by an Iranian politician to the Iranian people. During Dr. Mossadegh's trial after his arrest following the CIA backed coup in 1953, Dr. Mossadegh would pass confidential notes to Hossein Towfigh who would then distribute them to the relevant persons outside of court, including his own lawyers.

Iranian Prime Minister Dr. Mossadegh at his trial following the CIA backed coup of 1953, accompanied by "Towfigh Magazine" Editor-in-Chief Hossein Towfigh (far right)

== Death of Olympic Gold Medalist Gholamreza Takhti ==
After the death of Gholamreza Takhti, an Iranian Olympic gold medalist in wrestling & national hero, Towfigh, who was close friends with Takhti and organized his funeral, held an emergency meeting to determine what the cover of the magazine should be. Even though the magazine was always issued on Thursdays, they decided to release a special Takhti issue on Sunday 14 January 1968, which featured one of the most memorable stinging critiques of the plight of the Iranian people. On that cover Towfigh drew a caricature of a winged Takhti in heaven looking down at the thousands of Iranians mourning his death at his funeral procession and said to them "don't cry for me, cry for yourselves."

Iranian Olympic Gold Medalist Gholamreza Takhti on the cover of Towfigh Magazine after his death telling mourners "don't cry for me, cry for yourselves.

== Death ==
Towfigh was admitted to the intensive care unit of Firouzgar Hospital in Tehran on the first day of spring 2017 due to a lung infection. He died on 29 March 2017, at the age of 87. His body was buried in the special "Namavaran" section of Behesht Zahra cemetery reserved for dignitaries.
