= Abdel Fattah Essawi =

Egyptian wrestler

Personal information
- Nationality: Egyptian
- Born: 18 June 1924

Sport
- Sport: Wrestling

Abdel Fattah Essawi (born 18 June 1924) was an Egyptian wrestler. He competed in the men's freestyle featherweight at the 1952 Summer Olympics.
