= Linar Salimullin =

Soviet wrestler (1932–1993)

Personal information
- Full name: Linar Suleymanovich Salimullin
- Nationality: Soviet
- Born: 26 March 1932 Kamskoye Uste, Russia
- Died: 20 December 1993 (aged 61) Kiev, Ukraine

Sport
- Sport: Wrestling
- Club: Dynamo Kiev
Medal record
Men's freestyle wrestling
World Cup
Silver medal – second place	1956 Istanbul	-62 kg

Linar Suleymanovich Salimullin (26 March 1932 – 20 December 1993) was a Soviet freestyle wrestler and sambist of Tatar descent. He competed in the men's freestyle featherweight at the 1956 Summer Olympics. After retirement from the competition he became a wrestling referee.
