= Abbas Zandi =

Iranian wrestler (1930–2017)

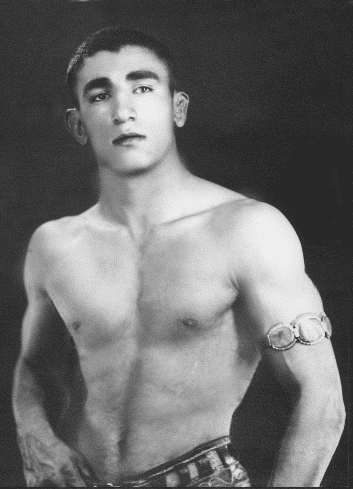

Personal information
- Born: 3 June 1930 Tehran, Imperial State of Persia
- Died: 30 October 2017 (aged 87) Tehran, Iran

Sport
- Sport: Freestyle wrestling, koshti pahlavāni

Achievements and titles
- National finals: Pahlevan of Iran (4): 1328, 1332, 1333, 1334
Medal record
Representing Iran
Men's freestyle wrestling
World Championships
Gold medal – first place	1954 Tokyo	79 kg
Asian Games
Gold medal – first place	1958 Tokyo	+87 kg

Abbas Zand more known as Abbas Zandi (Persian: عباس زندی; 3 June 1930 – 30 October 2017) was an Iranian bastani practitioner, freestyle wrestler, and coach. Zandi competed in three Olympic Games: 1948 in London, 1952 in Helsinki, and 1956 in Melbourne.

== Early life and career ==
Zandi was born in the Sang-e-laj neighborhood of Tehran. When he was 14, he began training in wrestling at Babr Club, coached by Abdolhossein Feyli and Hassan Sa'dian. At 17, he began representing Iran in international competition. At 18, Zandi won an annual tournament to become the youngest Pahlevan of Iran. He would become Pahlevan three more times between 1950 and 1953. He won gold medals at the 1954 World Wrestling Championships at 79 kg and the 1958 Asian Games at 87+ kg. Zandi died on October 30, 2017, at the age of 87.
