= Viking Palm =

Swedish wrestler (1923–2009)

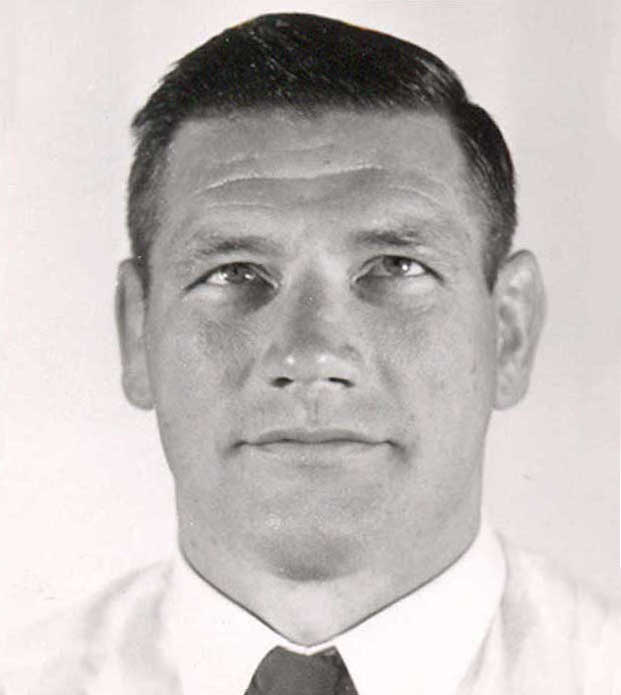

Personal information
- Born: 13 October 1923 Broby, Sweden
- Died: 19 January 2009 (aged 85) Täby, Stockholm, Sweden
- Height: 181 cm (5 ft 11 in)

Sport
- Sport: Freestyle wrestling
- Club: GAK Enighet, Malmö; Eslövs AIF; BK Viking, Broby
Medal record
Men's freestyle wrestling
Representing Sweden
Olympic Games
Gold medal – first place	1952 Helsinki	87 kg
World Championships
Silver medal – second place	1951 Helsinki	87 kg
Bronze medal – third place	1954 Tokyo	87 kg
European Championships
Silver medal – second place	1949 Istanbul	87 kg

Bror Viking Palm (13 October 1923 – 19 January 2009) was a Swedish light-heavyweight freestyle wrestler. He competed at the 1952, 1956 and 1960 Olympics and won a gold medal in 1952, finishing fourth in 1960. In 1960 his bronze medal match against Anatoly Albul ended in a draw, but Albul had a lower body weight. Palm won two medals at the world championships, in 1951 and 1954.

Palm was born to a farmer and started training in wrestling aged 16, together with his elder brother Evert. He had a long wrestling career and reached the final of his last national championships aged 47. He was a firefighter by profession, but in 1972 began working as a policeman in Solna.

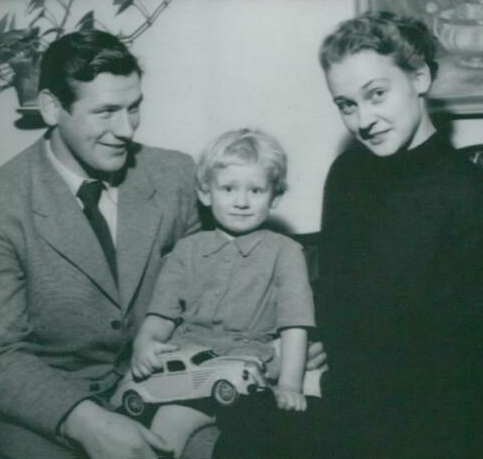
Palm with family in Malmö in 1952
