= Jozef Mewis =

Belgian wrestler (1931–2025)

Personal information
- Nickname: Zefatty
- Born: 23 March 1931 Antwerp, Belgium
- Died: 10 April 2025 (aged 94) Antwerp, Belgium
Medal record
Men's freestyle wrestling
Representing Belgium
Olympic Games
Silver medal – second place	1956 Melbourne	Featherweight

Jozef Jef Mewis (23 March 1931 – 10 April 2025) was a Belgian wrestler. He was an Olympic silver medalist in Freestyle wrestling in 1956. He also competed at the 1952, 1960 and 1964 Olympics. Mewis died in April 2025 at the age of 94. At his death, he remained the last Belgian wrestler to have won an Olympic medal in freestyle wrestling.
