= William Percy Rogers =

Australian zoologist ( 1914–1997)

Professor William Percy Rogers FAA
- Born: 23 November 1914; Katanning, Western Australia
- Died: 28 April 1997 (aged 82); Stirling, South Australia
- Spouses: Lillian Rogers (d. 1992); Marjorie Howley
- Scientific career
- Fields: Parasitology
- Institutions: Waite Agricultural Research Institute (University of Adelaide)

William Percy Rogers FAA (23 November 1914 – 28 April 1997) was an Australian zoologist known for his work in parasitology. He was Professor of Parasitology at the Waite Agricultural Research Institute 1966–1979.
