= Roger Bielle =

French wrestler

Personal information
- Nationality: French
- Born: 25 August 1928; Mérignac, France
- Died: 11 December 2014 (aged 86)

Sport
- Sport: Wrestling

Roger Bielle (25 August 1928 – 11 December 2014) was a French wrestler. He competed at the 1952, 1956, 1960 and the 1964 Summer Olympics.
