= Henry Wittenberg =

American wrestler

- Wittenberg circa 1940s

Personal information
- Born: September 18, 1918 Jersey City, New Jersey, U.S.
- Died: March 9, 2010 (aged 91) Somers, New York, U.S.

Sport
- Sport: Wrestling
- Club: City College New York, West Side YMCA, Police Association, AAU
Medal record
Men's freestyle wrestling
Representing the United States
Olympic Games
Gold medal – first place	1948 London	87 kg
Silver medal – second place	1952 Helsinki	87 kg
Maccabiah Games
Gold medal – first place	1950 Tel Aviv	+87 kg
Gold medal – first place	1953 Tel Aviv	+87 kg
Collegiate Wrestling
Representing CCNY
NCAA Championships
Silver medal – second place	1939 Lancaster	175 lb
Bronze medal – third place	1938 State College	165 lb

Henry Wittenberg (September 18, 1918 – March 9, 2010) was an American New York police officer, coach, competitor and Olympic champion in freestyle wrestling. He won two Olympic medals in freestyle wrestling (1948 and 1952), becoming the first American wrestler since 1908 to achieve this feat. He finished his career with over 400 wins and only four defeats, and was undefeated in more than 300 matches at one point. After Army service in the early 1940s, he served with commendations as a New York City Police Officer until around 1954, worked as an instructor and college wrestling coach at Yeshiva and then City College of New York from 1967 to 1979, competed in, coached, and helped to organize the Maccabiah Games, and served as an American Olympic coach in 1968 at Mexico City.

== Biography ==
Wittenberg was born in Jersey City, New Jersey. At Jersey City's William L. Dickinson High School, he remarkably did not partake in wrestling, the sport in which he would excel in college and later life, but swam and played chess. He captained his high school chess team, leading it to a New Jersey county championship.

=== College ===
As a student at City College of New York he did not consider himself athletic, but the wrestling coach Joe Sapora introduced him to the sport and he took to it quickly. By his junior year, he was placing in prestigious college tournaments. In 1939, the year he graduated with a degree in education, he was the co-captain of the CCNY wrestling team together with Stanley Graze. In 1939, he was also the runner-up at the National Collegiate Athletic Association (NCAA) 174 pound championship.

=== Wrestling highlights ===
With World War II canceling the Olympics in the early 1940s, Wittenberg served in the military, working as a hand-to-hand combat instructor in the Army. Unlike many wrestlers of his era, he effectively used weight-lifting to increase his strength during his career, though it was counter to the advice of many coaches. In the twelve years between 1938 and 1952, he entered eight National AAU freestyle tournaments and won eight non-consecutive championships, representing the West Side YMCA of New York and later the Police Sports Association. During an era when wrestling was peaking in popularity in the Northeast, Wittenberg received second place at the AAU tournament in 1940 in the 175 pound class, and won or placed highly in the tournament in 1941, 1943, 1944, 1946, 1947, 1948 and 1952, competing primarily in the 191 pound weight class.

He took a break from wrestling after the 1948 Olympics, but returned to the sport in 1951 hoping to qualify for the 1952 Olympics. Nearly undefeated, between 1939 and 1951 he wrestled and won nearly 300 matches in a row. In the first Israeli Maccabiah games in 1950 and again in 1953, he won gold medals in the freestyle heavyweight class and subsequently retired in 1953.

=== Gold and silver Olympic medals ===
He entered the 1948 Summer Olympics in London, wrestling at the weight class 191.5 pounds. Wittenberg was undefeated in five straight matches prior to receiving his gold medal. In the semifinals, he tore muscle tendons in his chest. His coach did not want him to wrestle in the finals, but Wittenberg was stubborn and wrestled anyway, eventually winning the gold medal match. When he returned to the Bronx, he received a hero's welcome. He subsequently took a break from wrestling competition until 1951, when he began training for the 1952 Olympics.

Four years after his first Olympics despite having trained only a year after a long time off, Wittenberg competed in the 1952 Summer Olympics in Helsinki as the returning champion. He again reached the final match, though he lost to Swede Wiking Palm, receiving the silver medal rather than the gold and breaking a long winning streak. He became the first American wrestler since 1908 to earn two Olympic medals. The defeat, impressively was only the third of his career.

=== Professional and civic life ===
Wittenberg had a successful professional career outside of competing as an athlete. He earned a master's degree in health education at the Teachers College, Columbia University. Shortly after completing his education, around 1941 he became an officer in the New York City Police Department, winning five commendations for bravery while on the force. He married in June 1941. He returned to the force after his military service in the 1940s. After leaving the police force in 1954 with the rank of Detective Sergeant, he worked in a more lucrative position in the printing industry in Manhattan, where he continued to work until 1967. He was actively involved in the Police Sports Association as well as becoming involved in the establishment of the Maccabiah Games, which are held every four years for Jewish athletes around the world.

==== Coaching ====
In 1959, he served as the U.S. National Team Wrestling Coach which competed in Russia. He coached the collegiate level wrestlers at Yeshiva University from 1959 to 1967 and taught physical education and coached wrestling at his alma mater City College of New York from 1967 to 1979. In 1964, he wrote a best-selling book titled Isometric Exercises in 1964 that has endured through five printings. Around 1979, he retired and moved to Somers, New York.

Impressively, he coached the 1968 Olympic team in Mexico City. Attending the Olympics that year, he was next door to the Israeli wrestling athletes who were killed by terrorists in the 1972 Olympic Games in Munich.

He died in March 2010 at his home in Somers, New York. He was survived by a daughter, Susan and a son, Michael.

== Honors ==
Wittenberg was the first inductee to the CCNY Alumni Varsity Association Hall of Fame, and was elected into the National Wrestling Hall of Fame in 1977.

From 1995 to 2015, Yeshiva University held an annual wrestling tournament named in his honor for Yeshiva high schools across the country. Yeshiva cancelled the wrestling program in 2015, and the tournament is now hosted by the Yeshiva Wrestling Association at The Frisch School in Paramus, NJ.

Wittenberg was inducted into the National Jewish Sports Hall of Fame and Museum on March 21, 1993, recognizing his gold medal-winning performances at the 1950 Maccabiah Games (in heavyweight freestyle) and the 1953 Maccabiah Games.

== See also ==
- List of select Jewish wrestlers
