= Kioumars Saberi Foumani =

Iranian satirist, writer and teacher

- Born: August 29, 1941; Fuman, Iran
- Died: April 30, 2004 (aged 62); Tehran, Iran
- Occupations: Writer, satirist and journalist

Kioumars Saberi Foumani (August 29, 1941 – April 30, 2004) (Persian: کیومرث صابری فومنی) also known with his pen name Gol-Agha (Persian: گل آقا), was an Iranian satirist, writer, and teacher.

== Education and personal life ==
Saberi was born during the Second World War in Sowme'eh Sara (Persian: صومعه سرا), a city in Gilan Province. His father, originally from Rasht, worked for the Ministry of Economic Affairs and Finance. He was transferred to Sowme'eh Sara in 1938 and then to Fuman in 1942 where he died a few months later.

His mother, who was the daughter of a respected cleric and one of the few educated women in the city, taught the Quran after the death of her husband. His brother, who was 14 years older, had to leave school at the age of 15 to work to help with the family expenses.

Education for Saberi was hard because of his family's poverty and he had to start working in a tailor shop after finishing his elementary education. He also worked in his brother's bicycle repair shop during elementary school and high school.

He started high school education at his mother's insistence. At the age of 16, he gained entry to Sari's Agriculture teacher's college (Persian: دانشسراي كشاورزي ساري) that only accepted one student from Fuman each year. He continued his college education and graduated in 1959. He worked as a teacher from 1959 to 1961.

At the age of 20, he took his high school exams and received his high school diploma. He continued his education at the University of Tehran while working as a teacher. He achieved his Bachelor of Science degree in political science in 1965.

He spent most of the 1970s reading and teaching and in 1978 he obtained his master's degree in comparative literature from the University of Tehran.

Saberi got married in 1966 and he had a daughter and a son. His son died in a car accident in 1985 but this sad incident did not stop him from reaching his goal, which was to make people smile.

Kioumars Saberi Foumani died on April 30, 2004.

== Political involvement ==
During his first year at university, Saberi was arrested for participating in student demonstrations and started to write political satire in Towfigh magazine. Towfigh magazine was Iran's most respected pro-democracy political satire magazine, with the highest circulation in Iranian history. Its editor in chief was Hossein Towfigh who, along with his brothers Hassan and Abbas, turned Towfigh magazine into the most influential journal in Iranian history. Saberi became one of the many staff writers of Towfigh magazine.

After the Iranian Revolution, he became the cultural advisor for Mohammad Ali Rajai. One of his other political posts was as the counselor to the minister of Housing and Urban Development of Iran.

== Writings ==
Saberi composed his first poem of the ghazal form when he was 14 and he named it "Orphan" (Persian: یتیم). His first published writing was another poem called "Orphan" which was published in Omid Iran magazine. His writings before the Iranian Revolution were mainly published in Towfigh.

He was one of the contributors of a political satire magazine Tawfiq. His pen names in the magazine included Mirza-Gol (Persian: ميرزاگل), Abdolfanoos (Persian: عبدالفانوس), Rish-Sefid (Persian: ريش سفيد; meaning a white-bearded and knowledgeable person), Lode (Persian: لوده clown), Gardan-Shekasteye-Fumani (Persian: گردن شكستة فومني; meaning "a person from Fuman with broken neck").

Following the Revolution, Saberi worked in different political positions before deciding to leave politics. He was in charge of Roshde-Adabe-Farsi magazine and sometimes he wrote for the Ettelaat newspaper. He started a column called "Do-Kalame-Harfe-Hesab" in Ettelaat in 1984 that was a starting point for political satires after the revolution. He continued writing for this column for six years until he started his own magazine called Gol-Agha in 1990. His courageous and powerful writings were appreciated by many famous authors such as Mohammad Ali Jamalzadeh. Saberi received first prize in press exhibition of 1992 and 1994 and second prize in 1993. He stopped writing for Ettelaat in 1993.

The main characters in his writings are Gol-Agha, Shagholam, Mamasadegh, Kamineh (The wife of Mamasadegh), Mash-Rajab and Ghazanfar.

In 2003 in his last editorial in Gol-Agha, Saberi announced that publishing Gol-Agha would be stopped without providing any reasons, explicitly. He wrote that he has been thinking most of his time for the last three months, and tried to write this announcement many times.

His publications include:

1. The Command from Ali to Malik ibn Ashter (1978) (Persian: برداشتي از فرمان حضرت علي (ع) به مالك اشتر)
2. Analyzing the story of Zahhak and Kaveh the Blacksmith (Persian: تحليل داستان ضحاك و كاوه آهنگر)
3. The Correspondence between Shahid Rajai and Banisadr (Persian: مكاتبات شهيد رجايي و بنيصدر)
4. The First interpellation in the Islamic Republic of Iran (Persian: اولين استيضاح در جمهوري اسلامي ايران)
5. Visiting the Soviet Union (Persian: ديدار از شوروي)
6. Collection of Do-Kalame-Harfe-Hesab (Volume 1, 2, 3, 4) (Persian: گزيدة دو كلمه حرف حساب جلد اول دوم سوم چهارم)

== See also ==
- Iraj Mirza
- Seyyed Ebrahim Nabavi
- Persian literature
