= Adil Atan =

Turkish wrestler (1929–1989)

Personal information
- Born: 1 January 1929 Adapazarı, Turkey
- Died: 18 April 1989 (aged 60)
Medal record
Men's freestyle wrestling
Representing Turkey
Olympic Games
Bronze medal – third place	1952 Helsinki	87 kg
World Championships
Silver medal – second place	1954 Tokyo	87 kg
World Cup
Gold medal – first place	1956 Istanbul	87 kg

Adil Atan (Abkhaz: name Twanba, 1 January 1929 – 18 April 1989) was a Turkish wrestler. He was born in Adapazarı in the Sakarya Province. He was Olympic bronze medalist in Freestyle wrestling in 1952, and also competed at the 1956 Olympics.
