= Frank Kirwin =

Australian rules footballer

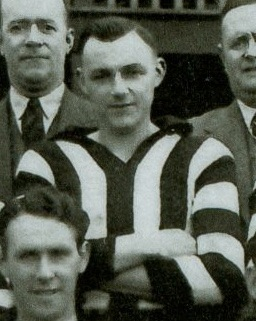
- Kirwin in 1943

Personal information
- Full name: Frank Kirwin
- Born: 20 October 1921
- Died: 6 April 1997 (aged 75)
- Original team: Abbotsford
- Height: 180 cm (5 ft 11 in)
- Weight: 80 kg (176 lb)

Playing career^{1}
Years	Club	Games (Goals)
1943	Collingwood	3 (0)
- ^{1} Playing statistics correct to the end of 1943.

Frank Kirwin (20 October 1921 – 6 April 1997) was an Australian rules footballer who played with Collingwood in the Victorian Football League (VFL).
