= Risaburo Tominaga =

Japanese wrestler

Personal information
- Nationality: Japanese
- Born: 14 February 1930 Osaka, Japan

Sport
- Sport: Wrestling

Risaburo Tominaga (富永 利三郎, Tominaga Risaburō; born 14 February 1930) is a Japanese wrestler. He competed in the men's freestyle featherweight at the 1952 Summer Olympics.
