= Nasser Givehchi =

Iranian wrestler (1932–2017)

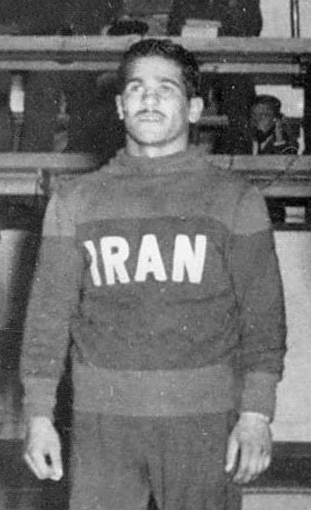
- Givehchi at the 1952 Olympics

Personal information
- Native name: ناصر گیوه‌چی
- Born: 12 November 1932 Tehran, Imperial State of Persia
- Died: 15 May 2017 (aged 84) Tehran, Iran

Sport
- Sport: Freestyle wrestling
Medal record
Representing Iran
Olympic Games
Silver medal – second place	1952 Helsinki	62 kg
Asian Games
Bronze medal – third place	1958 Tokyo	62 kg

Nasser Givehchi (Persian: ناصر گیوه‌چی, 12 November 1932 – 15 May 2017) was an Iranian featherweight freestyle wrestler. He competed at the 1952 and 1956 Olympics and won a silver medal in 1952. He ranked fifth at the 1954 World Wrestling Championships and won a bronze medal at the 1958 Asian Games. After retiring from competitions he had a long career as a national wrestling coach and international referee.
