= Harihar Banerjee =

Indian sports shooter (1922–1999)

Personal information
- Born: 1 March 1918

Sport
- Sport: Sports shooting
- Club: South Calcutta Rifle Club, Kolkata

Harihar Banerjee (15 April 1922 - 28 March 1999) was an Indian sports shooter. He competed at the 1952 Summer Olympics and 1956 Summer Olympics.
