= Niilo Turkkila =

Finnish wrestler (1921–2012)

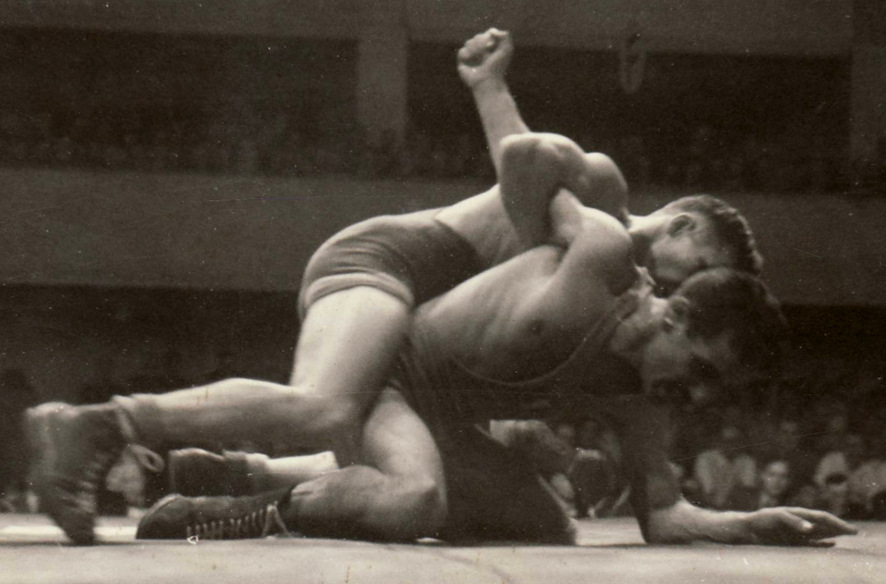
- Turkkila (top) at the 1951 World Championships

Personal information
- Born: 22 March 1921 Kymi, Finland
- Died: 25 August 2012 (aged 91) Helsinki, Finland

Sport
- Sport: Freestyle wrestling Greco-Roman wrestling
- Club: TUL
Medal record
Men's wrestling
Representing Finland
World Championships
Silver medal – second place	1951 Helsinki	Freestyle -57 kg

Niilo Ensio Turkkila (22 March 1921 – 25 August 2012) was a Finnish wrestler. Competing in the 57 kg division he won national titles in Greco-Roman wrestling in 1949–50 and in freestyle wrestling in 1950–51, and placed second in freestyle at the 1951 World Championships. After retiring from competitions he worked as a wrestling referee and sports functionary. He was married and had three children, born in 1946, 1948 and 1954.
