= Armand Bernard (wrestler) =

Canadian wrestler

Personal information
- Born: 22 June 1928 Montreal, Quebec, Canada
- Died: 24 June 2010 (aged 82) Bathurst, New Brunswick, Canada

Sport
- Sport: Wrestling

Armand Bernard (22 June 1928 – 24 June 2010) was a Canadian wrestler. He competed in the men's freestyle featherweight at the 1952 Summer Olympics.
