= Bayram Şit =

Turkish wrestler and coach (1930–2019)

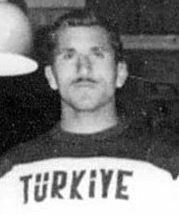
- Şit at the 1952 Olympics

Personal information
- Born: 1930 Akşar, Acıpayam, Turkey
- Died: 29 May 2019 (aged 89)

Sport
- Sport: Freestyle wrestling
Medal record
Representing Turkey
Olympic Games
Gold medal – first place	1952 Helsinki	62 kg
World Championships
Silver medal – second place	1954 Tokyo	62 kg
World Cup
Bronze medal – third place	1956 Istanbul	62 kg
Mediterranean Games
Gold medal – first place	1951 Alexandria	62 kg

Bayram Şit (1930 – 29 May 2019) was a Turkish featherweight freestyle wrestler and coach. He competed at the 1952 and 1956 Olympics and won a gold medal in 1952, placing fourth in 1956. He also won a silver medal at the 1954 World Championships.
