= Henry Holmberg =

Swedish freestyle wrestler

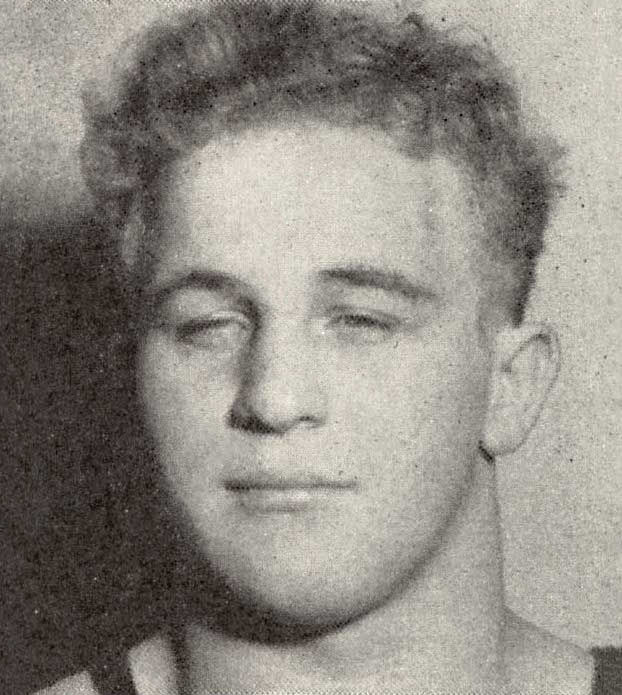

Personal information
- Full name: Henry Arthur Vilhelm Holmberg
- Born: 23 April 1924 Nättraby, Sweden
- Died: 21 July 1981 (aged 57) Stockholm, Sweden

Sport
- Sport: Freestyle wrestling
- Club: BK Athén, Stockholm
Medal record
Men's wrestling (freestyle)
Representing Sweden
World Championships
Bronze medal – third place	1951 Helsinki	-62 kg

Henry Arthur Vilhelm Holmberg (23 April 1924 – 21 July 1981) was a featherweight freestyle wrestler from Sweden who won a bronze medal at the 1951 World Championships. He competed at the 1952 Summer Olympics, but was eliminated in the third bout.
