= Joseph Van Muylders =

Belgian hockey player (1923–1997)

Personal information
- Nationality: Belgian
- Born: 5 May 1923 Woluwe-Saint-Pierre, Belgium
- Died: 20 April 1997 (aged 73) Woluwé-Saint-Pierre, Belgium

Sport
- Sport: Field hockey

Joseph Van Muylders (5 May 1923 – 20 April 1997) was a Belgian field hockey player. He competed in the men's tournament at the 1948 Summer Olympics. Van Muylders died on 20 April 1997, at the age of 73.
