= Keshav Mangave =

Indian wrestler

Personal information
- Nationality: Indian
- Born: 10 June 1926
- Died: 11 July 1997 (aged 71) Miraj, Maharashtra, India

Sport
- Sport: Wrestling

Keshav Mangave (10 June 1926 – 11 July 1997) was an Indian wrestler. He competed in the men's freestyle featherweight at the 1952 Summer Olympics.
