= Josiah Henson (wrestler) =

American wrestler

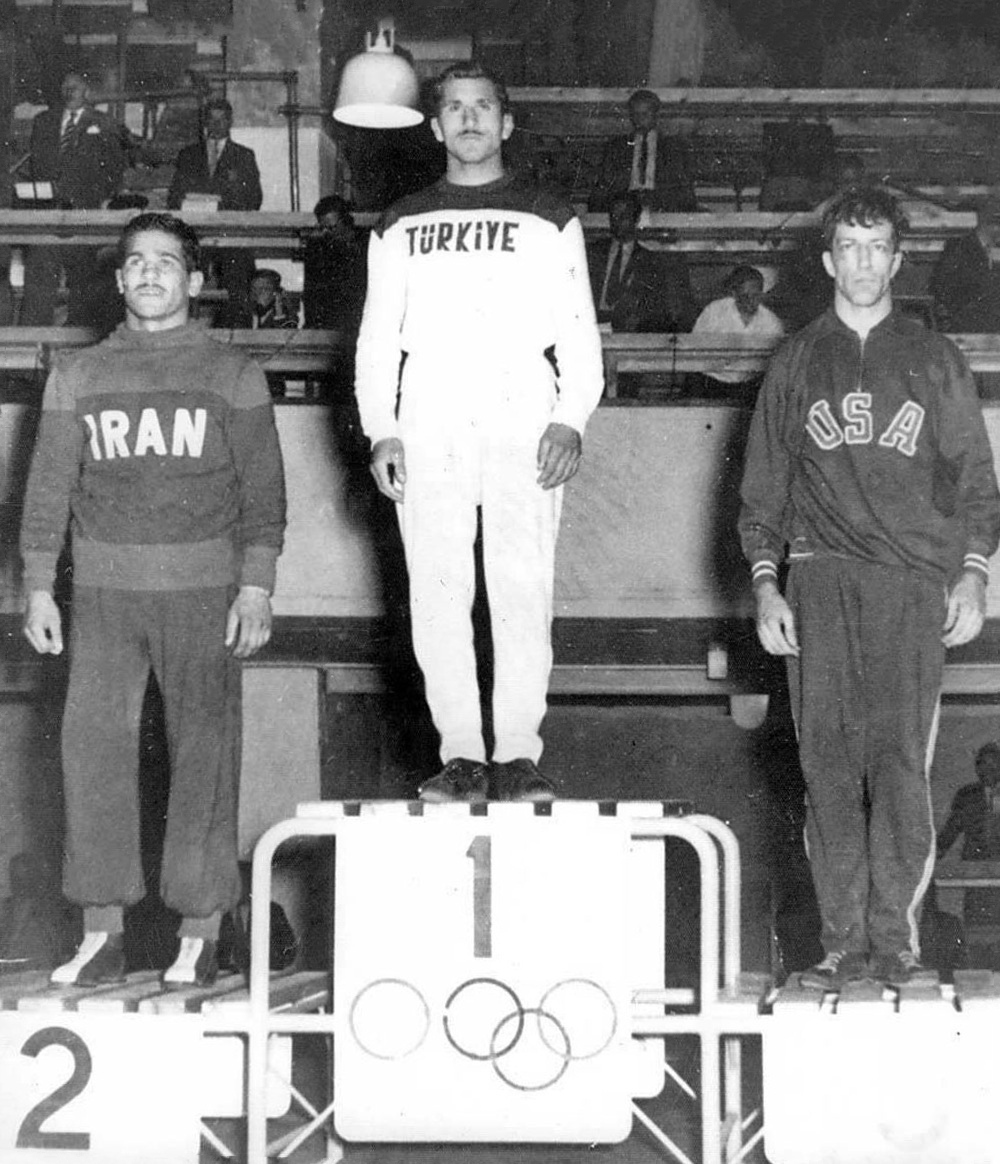
- Henson (right) at the 1952 Olympics

Personal information
- Born: 24 February 1922 Bristow, Oklahoma, U.S.
- Died: 4 April 2012 (aged 90) Tulsa, Oklahoma, U.S.

Sport
- Country: United States
- Sport: Wrestling
- Event: Freestyle
- Club: U.S. Navy
- Team: USA
Medal record
Men's freestyle wrestling
Representing United States
Olympic Games
Bronze medal – third place	1952 Helsinki	62 kg

Josiah "Joe" Henson (24 February 1922 – 4 April 2012) was an American freestyle wrestler and a career U.S. Navy officer. In 1952 he won the AAU wrestling championships without losing a single point and was named the tournament's outstanding wrestler. The same year he won an Olympic bronze medal. Henson attended every Summer Olympics from 1952 to 2000 in various capacities, as a competitor, referee, member of the U.S. Olympic Committee, and acting president of the World Taekwondo Federation. He served a four-year term as chairman of the U.S. Olympic Wrestling Committee and later became the AAU president.

In 2006, he was named a Distinguished Member of the National Wrestling Hall of Fame, joining his elder brother and former Naval Academy Assistant Wrestling Coach Dr. Stanley W. Henson. He was elected to the Eastern Intercollegiate Wrestling Association Wrestling Hall of Fame in 2012.

== Biography ==
Henson was born to Stanley Willard Henson and Irene Hopkins Henson. On 7 June 1944 he graduated from the United States Naval Academy and then had a long career as a military officer. He saw action in the Battle of Leyte Gulf, but shortly after the end of World War II was detached from ship-related duties and began his flight training. He then served in Panama and Guantanamo Bay, eventually becoming Captain (1965) and Commanding Officer of VS-31 at NAS Quonset Point. In the 1940s–60s he flew every major type of Navy plane and conducted more than 300 carrier landings. He also served as a gunnery and aviation instructor at the U.S. Naval Academy and as the Navy's aviation and missile officer with the Military Assistance Advisory Group operating out of the American Embassy in Paris, France.

After retiring from the Navy, he founded the Henson Company in Virginia, which specialized in producing wrestling equipment and in distributing Adidas wrestling equipment in North America. In 1967 he earned a master's degree in international relations from George Washington University.

Henson was a long-term resident of Arlington and Falls Church, Virginia, where he arrived while on duty with U.S. Navy in 1963. He died aged 90, following a stroke and a heart attack. He was survived by his wife, Gloria, a daughter, and two sons.
