= Towfigh =

Iranian political and satirical weekly magazine (1923–1971)

- Cover of the issue 19
- Editor: Hossein Towfigh
- Categories: Satirical magazine
- Frequency: Weekly
- Founder: Hossein Towfigh
- Founded: 1923
- Final issue: 1971
- Country: Qajar Iran; Pahlavi Iran
- Based in: Tehran
- Language: Persian

Towfigh, also known as Tawfiq, (Persian: توفیق) was a weekly satirical magazine which was published between 1923 and 1971 in Tehran, Iran, with some interruptions. It was among the critics of the Pahlavi rule.

The journal went through three phases: from 1923 until 1939, under founding editor Hossein Towfigh the magazine was more nationalistic; from 1941 until 1953, under the son Mohammad-Ali Towfigh, the magazine was more politically and government-critical; and later versions of the magazine, under Towfigh brothers Hassan, Hossein, and Abbas, focused on pure satire.

== History ==
Towfigh was launched in 1923 as a four-page weekly. However, there are other reports giving its foundation date as 1922. The headquarters of the magazine was in Tehran. Its founder was the Iranian journalist Hossein Towfigh who edited the magazine until his death in 1939. During his editorship the magazine ceased publication between 1932 and 1938.

He was succeeded by his son Mohammad Ali Towfigh as editor, who restarted the publication in 1941. In 1949 the magazine was banned following the frequent publication of cartoons mocking Prime Minister Abdolhossein Hazhir. Mohammad Ali Towfigh edited Towfigh until 1953 when the magazine was again closed down by the Iranian authorities after the overthrow of the government of Prime Minister Mohammad Mosaddegh.

It was restarted on 20 March 1958 with the title Fokāhi (Persian: Humorous). Later it began to be published under its original title and was edited by three nephews of Hossein Towfigh (named Hassan, Hossein and Abbas Towfigh). One of its frequent targets was Prime Minister Amir-Abbas Hoveyda who was instrumental in its closure by the censorship agency in 1971.

== Content, contributors and political stance ==
Towfigh had a changing political stance throughout its existence. It targeted and expressed the political views of lower- and middle-class Iranians. Its contributors were liberal and secular writers and artists. Major contributors included Abolqasem Halat, Abbas Forat, Iraj Pezeshkzad, Parviz Khatibi, Manouchehr Mahjoubi, Omran Salahi, Manouchehr Ehterami, Kioumars Saberi Foumani, Kambiz Derambakhsh and Naser Pakshir. Hadi Khorsandi started his journalistic career in the magazine which contributed to when he was a high school student.

The magazine featured political caricatures which appeared five years after its start when the Iranian government allowed their publication. These cartoons mostly attacked the members of the Pahlavi dynasty in a covert manner to avoid censorship. From 1938 the magazine began to contain literary material instead of political satire due to the strict censorship exerted by the government. Following the abdication of Reza Shah in 1941 Towfigh continued to publish political cartoons and political satire until its closure in 1971. In these satirical materials the Shah, Mohammad Reza Pahlavi, prime ministers and cabinet members were criticized for their alleged inefficiency and incompetency.

== Legacy ==
The Chicago Persian Microfilms Project initiated by the University of Chicago in 1985 archived the issues of Towfigh.

== Towfigh cover pages ==
Cover page dated 1967 (Salnameh Tawfiq)
