= Ibrahim Dadashov =

Soviet wrestler

Personal information
- Born: 10 April 1926 Baku, Transcaucasian SFSR, Soviet Union
- Died: 16 July 1990 (aged 64)

Sport
- Sport: Greco-Roman wrestling
- Club: Dynamo Baku

Ibrahim Pasha-ogly Dadashov (Russian: Ибрагим Паша-оглы Дадашёв, 10 April 1926 – 16 July 1990) was an Azerbaijani and Soviet featherweight freestyle wrestler. He competed for the Soviet Union at the 1952 Summer Olympics, but was eliminated after four bouts. Domestically he won the Soviet title in 1949, 1951, 1952 and 1956, placing second in 1954–55, and third in 1950. After retiring from competitions, he worked as a wrestling coach. His trainees included Aydin Ibrahimov.
