= Ignacio Lugo =

Venezuelan wrestler

Personal information
- Nationality: Venezuelan
- Born: 19 December 1932 (age 93)

Sport
- Sport: Wrestling

Ignacio Lugo (born 19 December 1932) is a Venezuelan wrestler. He competed in the men's freestyle featherweight at the 1952 Summer Olympics.
