= Pete Petrow =

Profile
- Position: Quarterback

Personal information
- Born: December 11, 1924; Saint Boniface, Manitoba, Canada
- Died: April 22, 1997 (aged 72); Saint Boniface, Manitoba, Canada
- Listed height: 5 ft 9 in (1.75 m)
- Listed weight: 165 lb (75 kg)

Career history
- 1949–1951: Winnipeg Blue Bombers

Peter Petrow (December 11, 1924 – April 22, 1997) was a Canadian professional football player who played for the Winnipeg Blue Bombers. He played football previously for the Manitoba Intermediate club.
