= Shrirang Jadhav =

Indian wrestler

Personal information
- Nationality: Indian
- Born: 15 November 1927
- Died: 1984 (aged 56–57)

Sport
- Sport: Wrestling

Shrirang Jadhav (15 November 1927 – 1984) was an Indian wrestler. He competed in the men's freestyle light heavyweight at the 1952 Summer Olympics.
