= 1954 World Wrestling Championships =

- Host city: Tokyo, Japan
- Dates: 22–25 May 1954

Champions
- Freestyle: Turkey

The 1954 World Freestyle Wrestling Championship were held in Tokyo, Japan from 22 to 25 May 1954.

== Medal table ==
Rank	Nation	Gold	Silver	Bronze	Total
1	Soviet Union	3	0	3	6
2	Turkey	2	3	1	6
3	Iran	2	1	0	3
4	Japan	1	1	2	4
5	Sweden	0	2	1	3
6	Hungary	0	1	0	1
7	Finland	0	0	1	1
Totals (7 entries)		8	8	8	24

== Team ranking ==
Rank	Men's freestyle	
Rank	Team	Points
1	Turkey	37
2	Soviet Union	35
3	Iran	24

== Medal summary ==
Event	Gold	Silver	Bronze
Flyweight; 52 kg	Hüseyin Akbaş; Turkey	Yushu Kitano; Japan	Mirian Tsalkalamanidze; Soviet Union
Bantamweight; 57 kg	Mustafa Dağıstanlı; Turkey	Lajos Bencze; Hungary	Tauno Jaskari; Finland
Featherweight; 62 kg	Shozo Sasahara; Japan	Bayram Şit; Turkey	Nikolay Muzashvili; Soviet Union
Lightweight; 67 kg	Tofigh Jahanbakht; Iran	Olle Anderberg; Sweden	Sergey Gabaraev; Soviet Union
Welterweight; 73 kg	Vakhtang Balavadze; Soviet Union	Mohammad Ali Fardin; Iran	Yutaka Kaneko; Japan
Middleweight; 79 kg	Abbas Zandi; Iran	İsmet Atlı; Turkey	Kazuo Katsuramoto; Japan
Light heavyweight 87 kg	August Englas; Soviet Union	Adil Atan; Turkey	Viking Palm; Sweden
Heavyweight +87 kg	Arsen Mekokishvili; Soviet Union	Bertil Antonsson; Sweden	İrfan Atan; Turkey
