= John Elliott (wrestler) =

Australian wrestler (1934–1997)

Personal information
- Nationality: Australian
- Born: 4 November 1934
- Died: 16 April 1997 (aged 62); Australia

Sport
- Sport: Wrestling

Richard John Elliott (4 November 1934 – 16 April 1997) was an Australian wrestler. He competed at the 1952 Summer Olympics and the 1956 Summer Olympics. Elliott died in Austria on 16 April 1997, at the age of 62.
