= Max Leichter =

German wrestler

Personal information
- Nationality: German
- Born: 20 April 1920; Frankfurt, Luxembourg
- Died: 11 February 1981 (aged 60); Frankfurt, Luxembourg

Sport
- Sport: Wrestling

Max Leichter (20 April 1920 – 11 February 1981) was a German wrestler. He competed in two events at the 1952 Summer Olympics.
