= 2007 World Wrestling Championships – Men's Greco-Roman 60 kg =

Men's Greco-Roman 60 kg at the 2007 World Championships
- Venue: Heydar Aliyev Sports and Concert Complex
- Dates: 17 September 2007
- Competitors: 41 from 41 nations

Medalists
gold medal	David Bedinadze	Georgia
silver medal	Makoto Sasamoto	Japan
bronze medal	Jung Ji-hyun	South Korea
bronze medal	Eusebiu Diaconu	Romania

The men's Greco-Roman 60 kilograms is a competition featured at the 2007 World Wrestling Championships, and was held at the Heydar Aliyev Sports and Concert Complex in Baku, Azerbaijan on 17 September 2007.

== Results ==
Legend

- F — Won by fall
- WO — Won by walkover

=== Finals ===
Semifinals				Final
Makoto Sasamoto (JPN)	1	2	1
Jung Ji-hyun (KOR)	2	1	1	Makoto Sasamoto (JPN)	3	1	0
David Bedinadze (GEO)	3	4		David Bedinadze (GEO)	0	1	4
Eusebiu Diaconu (ROU)	3	2

=== Top half ===
==== Section 1 ====
Round of 64

Round of 32
Håkan Nyblom (DEN)	1	2	0
Jurij Kohl (GER)	2	1	3
Ravinder Singh (IND)	0	0
László Kliment (HUN)	2	2
Emil Milev (BUL)	2	2
Yury Dubinin (BLR)	4	4
Svajūnas Adomaitis (LTU)	0	1
Makoto Sasamoto (JPN)	4	1

Round of 16
Jurij Kohl (GER)	1	0	1
László Kliment (HUN)	1	2	1
Yury Dubinin (BLR)	0	0
Makoto Sasamoto (JPN)	5	3

Quarterfinals
László Kliment (HUN)	2	0
Makoto Sasamoto (JPN)	1	4^{F}

==== Section 2 ====
Round of 64

Round of 32
Bünyamin Emik (TUR)	0	0
Sheng Jiang (CHN)	2	4
Petr Švehla (CZE)	0	1
Roberto Monzón (CUB)	3	3
Jung Ji-hyun (KOR)	2	1
Vitaliy Rahimov (AZE)	0	1
Ali Ashkani (IRI)	8	5^{F}
Ahmed Juma (IRQ)	0	1

Round of 16
Sheng Jiang (CHN)	5	2
Roberto Monzón (CUB)	0	0
Jung Ji-hyun (KOR)	4	7
Ali Ashkani (IRI)	0	1

Quarterfinals
Sheng Jiang (CHN)	1	1
Jung Ji-hyun (KOR)	2	3

=== Bottom half ===
==== Section 3 ====
Round of 64
Jansel Ramírez (DOM)
Andrejs Zjatkovs (LAT)	W	O

Round of 32
David Bedinadze (GEO)	2	0	3
Jarkko Ala-Huikku (FIN)	2	2	0
Christos Gikas (GRE)	2	3
Ashraf El-Gharably (EGY)	2	0
Ho Song-il (PRK)	4	4
Marger Pormann (EST)	0	2
Hannes Lienbacher (AUT)	3	3
Andrejs Zjatkovs (LAT)	0	0

Round of 16
David Bedinadze (GEO)	1	1	7
Christos Gikas (GRE)	2	1	0
Ho Song-il (PRK)	1	2
Hannes Lienbacher (AUT)	1	1

Quarterfinals
David Bedinadze (GEO)	3	4
Ho Song-il (PRK)	3	2

==== Section 4 ====
Round of 64
Khosrov Melikyan (ARM)	1	1	0
Suren Gevorkyan (UKR)	1	2	3
Eusebiu Diaconu (ROU)	1	3	2
Éric Buisson (FRA)	1	0	1
Davor Štefanek (SRB)	6	6
Paolo Fucile (ITA)	0	0
Stig-André Berge (NOR)	3	1
Joe Betterman (USA)	0	1
Dilshod Aripov (UZB)	4	3
Iván Duque (COL)	0	0
Islambek Albiev (RUS)	6	6
Mohamed Zoghbi (ALG)	0	0
Ruslan Tyumenbayev (KGZ)	6	0	4
Luis Liendo (VEN)	0	2	5
Tomasz Świerk (POL)	1	1
Nurbakyt Tengizbayev (KAZ)	4	2

Round of 32
Suren Gevorkyan (UKR)	1	1
Eusebiu Diaconu (ROU)	1	1
Davor Štefanek (SRB)	0	2	4
Stig-André Berge (NOR)	4	1	1
Dilshod Aripov (UZB)	0	1
Islambek Albiev (RUS)	3	1
Luis Liendo (VEN)	1	0
Nurbakyt Tengizbayev (KAZ)	4	2

Round of 16
Eusebiu Diaconu (ROU)	2	2
Davor Štefanek (SRB)	1	0
Islambek Albiev (RUS)	0	7	1
Nurbakyt Tengizbayev (KAZ)	5	0	2

Quarterfinals
Eusebiu Diaconu (ROU)	3	1	1
Nurbakyt Tengizbayev (KAZ)	2	4	1

=== Repechage ===
Repechage round 2
Svajūnas Adomaitis (LTU)	2	1	1
Yury Dubinin (BLR)	1	1	1
Jarkko Ala-Huikku (FIN)	3	3
Christos Gikas (GRE)	1	0

Repechage round 3
Yury Dubinin (BLR)	2	2
László Kliment (HUN)	1	0
Jarkko Ala-Huikku (FIN)	4	4
Ho Song-il (PRK)	2	0

Bronze medals
Yury Dubinin (BLR)	1	2	0
Jung Ji-hyun (KOR)	1	3	7
Jarkko Ala-Huikku (FIN)	1	1
Eusebiu Diaconu (ROU)	2	1
