= 2003 World Wrestling Championships – Men's Greco-Roman 60 kg =

Men's Greco-Roman 60 kg at the 2003 World Championships
- Venue: Palais des Sports Robert Oubron
- Dates: 3–5 October 2003
- Competitors: 42 from 42 nations

Medalists
gold medal	Armen Nazaryan	Bulgaria
silver medal	Roberto Monzón	Cuba
bronze medal	Eusebiu Diaconu	Romania

The men's Greco-Roman 60 kilograms is a competition featured at the 2003 World Wrestling Championships, and was held at the Palais des Sports Robert Oubron in Créteil, France from 3 to 5 October 2003.

== Results ==
Legend

- F — Won by fall
- R — Retired
- WO — Won by walkover

=== Preliminary round ===
==== Pool 1 ====
Pos	Athlete	Pld	W	L	CP	TP	UKR	IND	CZE
1	Oleksandr Khvoshch (UKR)	2	2	0	6	6	—	3–0	3–0
2	Ravinder Singh (IND)	2	1	1	4	13	0–3 PO	—	13–2
3	Jan Hocko (CZE)	2	0	2	1	2	0–3 PO	1–4 SP	—

Source: Official website

==== Pool 2 ====
Pos	Athlete	Pld	W	L	CP	TP	POL	MDA	POR
1	Włodzimierz Zawadzki (POL)	2	2	0	6	12	—	4–0	8–0
2	Ion Gaimer (MDA)	2	1	1	3	8	0–3 PO	—	8–5
3	Hugo Passos (POR)	2	0	2	1	5	0–3 PO	1–3 PP	—

Source: Official website

==== Pool 3 ====
Pos	Athlete	Pld	W	L	CP	TP	GER	LTU	NED
1	Jurij Kohl (GER)	2	2	0	8	24	—	13–0	11–0
2	Aleksej Djakonov (LTU)	2	1	1	3	5	0–4 ST	—	5–1
3	Arash Rayhaniasl (NED)	2	0	2	1	1	0–4 ST	1–3 PP	—

Source: Official website

==== Pool 4 ====
Pos	Athlete	Pld	W	L	CP	TP	CUB	RUS	FRA
1	Roberto Monzón (CUB)	2	2	0	7	16	—	10–0	6–0
2	Nikolay Baraban (RUS)	2	1	1	3	3	0–4 ST	—	3–1
3	Djamel Ainaoui (FRA)	2	0	2	1	1	0–3 PO	1–3 PP	—

Source: Official website

==== Pool 5 ====
Pos	Athlete	Pld	W	L	CP	TP	KAZ	JPN	SUI
1	Nurlan Koizhaiganov (KAZ)	2	2	0	7	17	—	4–3	13–0
2	Makoto Sasamoto (JPN)	2	1	1	5	13	1–3 PP	—	10–0
3	Alois Fässler (SUI)	2	0	2	0	0	0–4 ST	0–4 ST	—

Source: Official website

==== Pool 6 ====
Pos	Athlete	Pld	W	L	CP	TP	TUR	PER	NOR
1	Bünyamin Emik (TUR)	2	2	0	6	17	—	9–4	8–2
2	Sidney Guzman (PER)	2	1	1	5	4	1–3 PP	—	WO
3	Robert Sollie (NOR)	2	0	2	1	2	1–3 PP	0–4 PA	—

Source: Official website

==== Pool 7 ====
Pos	Athlete	Pld	W	L	CP	TP	KOR	GRE	AZE
1	Kang Kyung-il (KOR)	2	2	0	6	13	—	5–2	8–0
2	Christos Gikas (GRE)	2	1	1	4	5	1–3 PP	—	3–0
3	Nuraddin Rajabov (AZE)	2	0	2	0	0	0–3 PO	0–3 PO	—

Source: Official website

==== Pool 8 ====
Pos	Athlete	Pld	W	L	CP	TP	ROM	ITA	ESP
1	Eusebiu Diaconu (ROM)	2	2	0	7	20	—	7–0	13–0
2	Riccardo Magni (ITA)	2	1	1	4	12	0–3 PO	—	12–1
3	Joaquín Martínez (ESP)	2	0	2	1	1	0–4 ST	1–4 SP	—

Source: Official website

==== Pool 9 ====
Pos	Athlete	Pld	W	L	CP	TP	FIN	IRI	CHN
1	Jarkko Ala-Huikku (FIN)	2	2	0	6	12	—	3–0	9–3
2	Ali Ashkani (IRI)	2	1	1	4	10	0–3 PO	—	10–0
3	Sheng Jiang (CHN)	2	0	2	1	3	1–3 PP	0–4 ST	—

Source: Official website

==== Pool 10 ====
Pos	Athlete	Pld	W	L	CP	TP	BUL	TKM	AUS
1	Armen Nazaryan (BUL)	2	2	0	7	17	—	10–0	7–0
2	Döwletberdi Mamedow (TKM)	2	1	1	3	3	0–4 ST	—	3–1
3	Aleksandr Tsertsvadze (AUS)	2	0	2	1	1	0–3 PO	1–3 PP	—

Source: Official website

==== Pool 11 ====
Pos	Athlete	Pld	W	L	CP	TP	GEO	SCG	ISR
1	Akaki Chachua (GEO)	2	2	0	8	31	—	19–6	12–0
2	Davor Štefanek (SCG)	2	1	1	5	21	1–4 SP	—	15–0 Fall
3	Alexander Khudish (ISR)	2	0	2	0	0	0–4 ST	0–4 TO	—

Source: Official website

==== Pool 12 ====
Pos	Athlete	Pld	W	L	CP	TP	AUT	BLR	KGZ
1	Hannes Lienbacher (AUT)	2	1	1	4	8	—	6–1	2–4
2	Vadzim Bukrei (BLR)	2	1	1	4	5	1–3 PP	—	4–1
3	Maksat Ubukeev (KGZ)	2	1	1	4	5	3–1 PP	1–3 PP	—

Source: Official website

==== Pool 13 ====
Pos	Athlete	Pld	W	L	CP	TP	USA	ARM	HUN
1	Jim Gruenwald (USA)	2	1	1	4	7	—	6–3	1–4
2	Karen Mnatsakanyan (ARM)	2	1	1	4	7	1–3 PP	—	4–0
3	László Bóna (HUN)	2	1	1	3	4	3–1 PP	0–3 PO	—

Source: Official website

==== Pool 14 ====
Pos	Athlete	Pld	W	L	CP	TP	EGY	UZB	IRQ
1	Ashraf El-Gharably (EGY)	2	2	0	7	17	—	5–1	12–0
2	Dilshod Aripov (UZB)	2	1	1	5	14	1–3 PP	—	13–0
3	Ali Mohammed (IRQ)	2	0	2	0	0	0–4 ST	0–4 ST	—

Source: Official website

=== Knockout round ===
Round of 16
Oleksandr Khvoshch (UKR)	11
Włodzimierz Zawadzki (POL)	14
Jurij Kohl (GER)	8
Roberto Monzón (CUB)	21
Nurlan Koizhaiganov (KAZ)	2
Bünyamin Emik (TUR)	5
Kang Kyung-il (KOR)	1
Eusebiu Diaconu (ROM)	3
Jarkko Ala-Huikku (FIN)	0
Armen Nazaryan (BUL)	6
Akaki Chachua (GEO)	12
Hannes Lienbacher (AUT)	5

Quarterfinals
Włodzimierz Zawadzki (POL)	1
Roberto Monzón (CUB)	3
Bünyamin Emik (TUR)	2
Eusebiu Diaconu (ROM)	11^{F}
Armen Nazaryan (BUL)	6
Akaki Chachua (GEO)	5
Jim Gruenwald (USA)	5
Ashraf El-Gharably (EGY)	0

Semifinals
Roberto Monzón (CUB)	8
Eusebiu Diaconu (ROM)	5
Armen Nazaryan (BUL)	4
Jim Gruenwald (USA)	1^{R}

Final
Roberto Monzón (CUB)	2
Armen Nazaryan (BUL)	6
Bronze medal match
Eusebiu Diaconu (ROM)	WO
Jim Gruenwald (USA)
