= 2005 World Wrestling Championships – Men's Greco-Roman 60 kg =

Men's Greco-Roman 60 kg at the 2005 World Championships
- Venue: László Papp Budapest Sports Arena
- Dates: 2 October 2005
- Competitors: 35 from 35 nations

Medalists
gold medal	Armen Nazaryan	Bulgaria
silver medal	Ali Ashkani	Iran
bronze medal	Eusebiu Diaconu	Romania
bronze medal	Petr Švehla	Czech Republic

The men's Greco-Roman 60 kilograms is a competition featured at the 2005 World Wrestling Championships, and was held at the László Papp Budapest Sports Arena in Budapest, Hungary on 2 October 2005.

== Results ==
Legend

- C — Won by 3 cautions given to the opponent
- F — Won by fall

=== Finals ===
Semifinals			Final
Ali Ashkani (IRI)	7	2
Eusebiu Diaconu (ROM)	6	1	Ali Ashkani (IRI)	0	3
Armen Nazaryan (BUL)	5	5	Armen Nazaryan (BUL)	6	4^{C}
Petr Švehla (CZE)	1	0

=== Top half ===
==== Section 1 ====
Round of 64

Round of 32
Joe Warren (USA)	2	6^{F}
Éric Buisson (FRA)	1	0
Mekhty Saparov (KAZ)	0	5	1
Luis Liendo (VEN)	3	1	4^{C}
David Bedinadze (GEO)	7	7
Haytham Chamas (LIB)	0	1
Ali Ashkani (IRI)	2	4
Vahan Juharyan (ARM)	1	0

Round of 16
Joe Warren (USA)	9	7
Luis Liendo (VEN)	6	0
David Bedinadze (GEO)	0	0
Ali Ashkani (IRI)	4	9

Quarterfinals
Joe Warren (USA)	1	0
Ali Ashkani (IRI)	2	7

==== Section 2 ====
Round of 64

Round of 32
Aleksey Shevtsov (RUS)	0	6	0
Makoto Sasamoto (JPN)	6	0	6
Joaquín Martínez (ESP)	1	1
Jung Kyung-ho (KOR)	4	5
Ravinder Singh (IND)	0	0
Eusebiu Diaconu (ROM)	9	7
Davor Štefanek (SCG)	5	1	6
Vitaliy Rahimov (AZE)	1	4	2

Round of 16
Makoto Sasamoto (JPN)	1	3
Jung Kyung-ho (KOR)	1	0
Eusebiu Diaconu (ROM)	7	4	7
Davor Štefanek (SCG)	0	5	0

Quarterfinals
Makoto Sasamoto (JPN)	0	0
Eusebiu Diaconu (ROM)	4	6

=== Bottom half ===
==== Section 3 ====
Round of 64

Round of 32
Jurij Kohl (GER)	0	8	6
Mikhail Siamionau (BLR)	2	4	3
Dilshod Aripov (UZB)	6	4^{C}
Ivan Alexandrov (ISR)	0	1
László Kliment (HUN)	2	3
Stig-André Berge (NOR)	1	0
Edgaras Venckaitis (LTU)	0	3
Armen Nazaryan (BUL)	9	11

Round of 16
Jurij Kohl (GER)	1	1
Dilshod Aripov (UZB)	1	3^{F}
László Kliment (HUN)	0	0
Armen Nazaryan (BUL)	6	5

Quarterfinals
Dilshod Aripov (UZB)	0	1	0
Armen Nazaryan (BUL)	4	1	3^{C}

==== Section 4 ====
Round of 64
Rinat Usupjanov (KGZ)	2	0
Bünyamin Emik (TUR)	5	3^{C}
Hugo Passos (POR)	2	2
Li Shujin (CHN)	1	0
Oleksiy Vakulenko (UKR)	6	8
Christos Gikas (GRE)	0	0

Round of 32
Ashraf El-Gharably (EGY)	5	2	6
Roberto Monzón (CUB)	0	5	0
Marko Isokoski (FIN)	2	0
Petr Švehla (CZE)	3	6
Milton Bailey (GUA)	0	0
Bünyamin Emik (TUR)	3	3
Hugo Passos (POR)	2	0
Oleksiy Vakulenko (UKR)	5	4

Round of 16
Ashraf El-Gharably (EGY)	2	6	0
Petr Švehla (CZE)	5	0	3
Bünyamin Emik (TUR)	8	0	0
Oleksiy Vakulenko (UKR)	1	5	5^{F}

Quarterfinals
Petr Švehla (CZE)	3	1^{C}
Oleksiy Vakulenko (UKR)	0	1

=== Repechage ===
Repechage round 2
Vahan Juharyan (ARM)	5	1	1
David Bedinadze (GEO)	0	2	1
Edgaras Venckaitis (LTU)	2	1
László Kliment (HUN)	4	1

Repechage round 3
Vahan Juharyan (ARM)	2	1
Joe Warren (USA)	0	1
László Kliment (HUN)	5	5
Dilshod Aripov (UZB)	0	1

Bronze medals
Vahan Juharyan (ARM)	1	0	0
Eusebiu Diaconu (ROM)	1	6	5
László Kliment (HUN)	1	0	1
Petr Švehla (CZE)	1	2	1^{C}
