= 2006 World Wrestling Championships – Men's Greco-Roman 60 kg =

Men's Greco-Roman 60 kg at the 2006 World Championships
- Venue: Tianhe Gymnasium
- Dates: 25 September 2006
- Competitors: 34 from 34 nations

Medalists
gold medal	Joe Warren	United States
silver medal	David Bedinadze	Georgia
bronze medal	Bünyamin Emik	Turkey
bronze medal	Vyacheslav Dzhaste	Russia

The men's Greco-Roman 60 kilograms is a competition featured at the 2006 World Wrestling Championships, and was held at the Tianhe Gymnasium in Guangzhou, China on 25 September 2006.

== Results ==
Legend

- F — Won by fall
- WO — Won by walkover

=== Finals ===
Semifinals			Final
Bünyamin Emik (TUR)	0	0
David Bedinadze (GEO)	2	3	David Bedinadze (GEO)	1	1	1
Joe Warren (USA)	1	2	Joe Warren (USA)	1	5	2
Eusebiu Diaconu (ROM)	1	1

=== Top half ===
==== Section 1 ====
Round of 64

Round of 32
Davor Štefanek (SCG)	9	8^{F}
Đặng Đình Huệ (VIE)	0	0
Makoto Sasamoto (JPN)	1	3	0
Nurbakyt Tengizbayev (KAZ)	2	0	6
Tomasz Świerk (POL)	1	3
Kang Kyung-il (KOR)	1	0
Armen Nazaryan (BUL)	3	1
Bünyamin Emik (TUR)	5	1

Round of 16
Davor Štefanek (SCG)	0	0
Nurbakyt Tengizbayev (KAZ)	6	4
Tomasz Świerk (POL)	0	1
Bünyamin Emik (TUR)	3	1

Quarterfinals
Nurbakyt Tengizbayev (KAZ)	0	1
Bünyamin Emik (TUR)	2	2

==== Section 2 ====
Round of 64

Round of 32
Nam Kyong-jin (PRK)	0	5	0
István Majoros (HUN)	2	5	2
Heinz Marnette (GER)	5	0	1
David Bedinadze (GEO)	1	4	1
Nikolaos Kaisidis (GRE)	3	0
Vitaliy Rahimov (AZE)	3	7
Xie Zhen (CHN)	1	0	1
Oleksiy Vakulenko (UKR)	1	6	3

Round of 16
István Majoros (HUN)	0	1
David Bedinadze (GEO)	6	1
Vitaliy Rahimov (AZE)	1	3	2
Oleksiy Vakulenko (UKR)	6	0	2

Quarterfinals
David Bedinadze (GEO)	5	3	5
Oleksiy Vakulenko (UKR)	5	0	3

=== Bottom half ===
==== Section 3 ====
Round of 64

Round of 32
Vyacheslav Dzhaste (RUS)	3	1
Jani Hermansson (FIN)	0	1
Lee Chun-nan (TPE)	5	3
Milton Bailey (GUA)	1	2
Joe Warren (USA)	2	3	3
Dilshod Aripov (UZB)	4	1	1
Ali Ashkani (IRI)	5	3
Petr Švehla (CZE)	1	2

Round of 16
Vyacheslav Dzhaste (RUS)	6	6
Lee Chun-nan (TPE)	0	0
Joe Warren (USA)	2	1
Ali Ashkani (IRI)	1	1

Quarterfinals
Vyacheslav Dzhaste (RUS)	1	0
Joe Warren (USA)	4	2

==== Section 4 ====
Round of 64
Hugo Passos (POR)	0	1	3
Ashraf El-Gharably (EGY)	4	1	1
Svajūnas Adomaitis (LTU)	2	2
Joaquín Martínez (ESP)	0	0

Round of 32
Håkan Nyblom (DEN)	4	3
Mikhail Siamionau (BLR)	0	0
Stig-André Berge (NOR)	0	1
Eusebiu Diaconu (ROM)	3	2
Roberto Monzón (CUB)	3	5
Karen Mnatsakanyan (ARM)	0	0
Hugo Passos (POR)	1	1
Svajūnas Adomaitis (LTU)	2	1

Round of 16
Håkan Nyblom (DEN)	2	3	2
Eusebiu Diaconu (ROM)	2	7	7
Roberto Monzón (CUB)	2	6
Svajūnas Adomaitis (LTU)	1	0

Quarterfinals
Eusebiu Diaconu (ROM)	3	6
Roberto Monzón (CUB)	0	0

=== Repechage ===
Repechage round 2
Heinz Marnette (GER)	W	O
István Majoros (HUN)
Dilshod Aripov (UZB)	1	0
Ali Ashkani (IRI)	2	2

Repechage round 3
Heinz Marnette (GER)	0	1
Oleksiy Vakulenko (UKR)	6	7
Ali Ashkani (IRI)	2	1
Vyacheslav Dzhaste (RUS)	4	2

Bronze medals
Oleksiy Vakulenko (UKR)	2	1
Bünyamin Emik (TUR)	6	3
Vyacheslav Dzhaste (RUS)	3	3
Eusebiu Diaconu (ROM)	2	2
