= 2002 World Wrestling Championships – Men's Greco-Roman 60 kg =

Men's Greco-Roman 60 kg at the 2002 World Championships
- Venue: Universal Sports Hall CSKA
- Dates: 21–22 September 2002
- Competitors: 37 from 37 nations

Medalists
gold medal	Armen Nazaryan	Bulgaria
silver medal	Włodzimierz Zawadzki	Poland
bronze medal	Roberto Monzón	Cuba

The men's Greco-Roman 60 kilograms is a competition featured at the 2002 World Wrestling Championships, and was held at the Universal Sports Hall CSKA in Moscow, Russia from 21 to 22 September 2002.

== Results ==
Legend

- F — Won by fall

=== Preliminary round ===
==== Pool 1 ====
Pos	Athlete	Pld	W	L	CP	TP	RUS	BLR	POR
1	Rustem Mambetov (RUS)	2	2	0	6	15	—	9–0	6–0
2	Yury Dubinin (BLR)	2	1	1	3	5	0–3 PO	—	5–0
3	Hugo Passos (POR)	2	0	2	0	0	0–3 PO	0–3 PO	—

Source: Official website

==== Pool 2 ====
Pos	Athlete	Pld	W	L	CP	TP	CUB	CHN	ISR
1	Roberto Monzón (CUB)	2	2	0	7	16	—	6–3	10–0
2	Yang Chang (CHN)	2	1	1	5	3	1–3 PP	—	WO
3	Ivan Alexandrov (ISR)	2	0	2	0	0	0–4 ST	0–4 PA	—

Source: Official website

==== Pool 3 ====
Pos	Athlete	Pld	W	L	CP	TP	UZB	KOR	GER
1	Asliddin Khudoyberdiev (UZB)	2	2	0	6	12	—	8–0	4–1
2	Bae Myung-hwan (KOR)	2	1	1	3	3	0–3 PO	—	3–2
3	Jurij Kohl (GER)	2	0	2	2	3	1–3 PP	1–3 PP	—

Source: Official website

==== Pool 4 ====
Pos	Athlete	Pld	W	L	CP	TP	JPN	AUS	NOR
1	Makoto Sasamoto (JPN)	2	2	0	7	13	—	3–2	10–0
2	Plamen Tchoukanov (AUS)	2	1	1	4	11	1–3 PP	—	9–0
3	Stig-André Berge (NOR)	2	0	2	0	0	0–4 ST	0–3 PO	—

Source: Official website

==== Pool 5 ====
Pos	Athlete	Pld	W	L	CP	TP	GEO	DEN	TPE
1	Akaki Chachua (GEO)	2	2	0	8	20	—	4–0 Fall	16–3
2	Håkan Nyblom (DEN)	2	1	1	4	10	0–4 TO	—	10–0
3	Lin Chien-liang (TPE)	2	0	2	1	3	1–4 SP	0–4 ST	—

Source: Official website

==== Pool 6 ====
Pos	Athlete	Pld	W	L	CP	TP	ROM	VEN	CZE
1	Eusebiu Diaconu (ROM)	2	2	0	6	12	—	5–3	7–0
2	Luis Liendo (VEN)	2	1	1	5	3	1–3 PP	—	WO
3	Petr Švehla (CZE)	2	0	2	0	0	0–3 PO	0–4 PA	—

Source: Official website

==== Pool 7 ====
Pos	Athlete	Pld	W	L	CP	TP	FRA	ARM	HUN
1	Djamel Ainaoui (FRA)	2	1	1	4	4	—	3–2	1–3
2	Karen Mnatsakanyan (ARM)	2	1	1	4	5	1–3 PP	—	3–0
3	László Bóna (HUN)	2	1	1	3	3	3–1 PP	0–3 PO	—

Source: Official website

==== Pool 8 ====
Pos	Athlete	Pld	W	L	CP	TP	POL	PER	YUG
1	Włodzimierz Zawadzki (POL)	2	2	0	8	14	—	4–1 Fall	10–0
2	Sidney Guzman (PER)	2	1	1	3	8	0–4 TO	—	7–3
3	Norbert Futo (YUG)	2	0	2	1	3	0–4 ST	1–3 PP	—

Source: Official website

==== Pool 9 ====
Pos	Athlete	Pld	W	L	CP	TP	MDA	AZE	ESP
1	Ion Gaimer (MDA)	2	2	0	7	14	—	4–3	10–0
2	Nuraddin Rajabov (AZE)	2	1	1	4	9	1–3 PP	—	6–4
3	Joaquín Martínez (ESP)	2	0	2	1	4	0–4 ST	1–3 PP	—

Source: Official website

==== Pool 10 ====
Pos	Athlete	Pld	W	L	CP	TP	UKR	FIN	KAZ
1	Oleksandr Khvoshch (UKR)	2	2	0	6	11	—	6–4	5–0
2	Jarkko Ala-Huikku (FIN)	2	1	1	4	12	1–3 PP	—	8–0
3	Yermek Zhumabekov (KAZ)	2	0	2	0	0	0–3 PO	0–3 PO	—

Source: Official website

==== Pool 11 ====
Pos	Athlete	Pld	W	L	CP	TP	USA	TUR	KGZ
1	Jim Gruenwald (USA)	2	2	0	6	8	—	4–2	4–0
2	Şeref Tüfenk (TUR)	2	1	1	5	13	1–3 PP	—	11–0
3	Valentin Malutin (KGZ)	2	0	2	0	0	0–3 PO	0–4 ST	—

Source: Official website

==== Pool 12 ====
Pos	Athlete	Pld	W	L	CP	TP	BUL	TKM	IRI	GRE
1	Armen Nazaryan (BUL)	3	3	0	9	15	—	3–1	5–0	7–0
2	Döwletberdi Mamedow (TKM)	3	2	1	7	8	1–3 PP	—	4–1	3–1
3	Bahman Tayyebi (IRI)	3	1	2	4	5	0–3 PO	1–3 PP	—	4–3
4	Christos Gikas (GRE)	3	0	3	2	4	0–3 PO	1–3 PP	1–3 PP	—

Source: Official website

=== Knockout round ===
Round of 16
Rustem Mambetov (RUS)	0
Roberto Monzón (CUB)	5^{F}
Asliddin Khudoyberdiev (UZB)	10
Makoto Sasamoto (JPN)	0
Akaki Chachua (GEO)	16^{F}
Eusebiu Diaconu (ROM)	7
Djamel Ainaoui (FRA)	0
Włodzimierz Zawadzki (POL)	4

Quarterfinals
Roberto Monzón (CUB)	6
Asliddin Khudoyberdiev (UZB)	4
Akaki Chachua (GEO)	6
Włodzimierz Zawadzki (POL)	7
Ion Gaimer (MDA)	1
Oleksandr Khvoshch (UKR)	6
Jim Gruenwald (USA)	0
Armen Nazaryan (BUL)	10

Semifinals
Roberto Monzón (CUB)	0
Włodzimierz Zawadzki (POL)	4
Oleksandr Khvoshch (UKR)	3
Armen Nazaryan (BUL)	5

Final
Włodzimierz Zawadzki (POL)	0
Armen Nazaryan (BUL)	3
Bronze medal match
Roberto Monzón (CUB)	3
Oleksandr Khvoshch (UKR)	0
