= 2001 World Wrestling Championships – Men's Greco-Roman 58 kg =

Men's Greco-Roman 58 kg at the 2001 World Championships
- Venue: Dimitris Tofalos Arena
- Dates: 7–9 December 2001
- Competitors: 37 from 37 nations

Medalists
gold medal	Dilshod Aripov	Uzbekistan
silver medal	Karen Mnatsakanyan	Armenia
bronze medal	Roberto Monzón	Cuba

The men's Greco-Roman 58 kilograms is a competition featured at the 2001 World Wrestling Championships, and was held at the Dimitris Tofalos Arena in Patras, Greece from 7 to 9 December 2001.

== Results ==
=== Preliminary round ===
==== Pool 1 ====
Pos	Athlete	Pld	W	L	CP	TP	CUB	FIN	RUS
1	Roberto Monzón (CUB)	2	2	0	7	14	—	11–0	3–0
2	Pasi Huhtala (FIN)	2	1	1	3	5	0–4 ST	—	5–2
3	Stanislav Lomachinsky (RUS)	2	0	2	1	2	0–3 PO	1–3 PP	—

Source: Japan Wrestling

==== Pool 2 ====
Pos	Athlete	Pld	W	L	CP	TP	CZE	KAZ	VEN
1	Petr Švehla (CZE)	2	2	0	6	9	—	4–2	5–1
2	Asset Imanbayev (KAZ)	2	1	1	4	6	1–3 PP	—	4–1
3	Jorge Cardozo (VEN)	2	0	2	2	2	1–3 PP	1–3 PP	—

Source: Japan Wrestling

==== Pool 3 ====
Pos	Athlete	Pld	W	L	CP	TP	IRI	SUI	ESP
1	Ali Ashkani (IRI)	2	2	0	8	22	—	10–0	12–0 Fall
2	Alois Fässler (SUI)	2	1	1	4	5	0–4 ST	—	5–0 Fall
3	Joaquín Martínez (ESP)	2	0	2	0	0	0–4 TO	0–4 TO	—

Source: Japan Wrestling

==== Pool 4 ====
Pos	Athlete	Pld	W	L	CP	TP	USA	AUT	UKR
1	Jim Gruenwald (USA)	2	2	0	7	13	—	10–0	3–2
2	Thomas Kathan (AUT)	2	1	1	3	5	0–4 ST	—	5–3
3	Ruslan Khakymov (UKR)	2	0	2	2	5	1–3 PP	1–3 PP	—

Source: Japan Wrestling

==== Pool 5 ====
Pos	Athlete	Pld	W	L	CP	TP	ISR	GRE	NOR
1	Ivan Alexandrov (ISR)	2	2	0	6	9	—	5–4	4–1
2	Efstathios Theodosiadis (GRE)	2	1	1	4	7	1–3 PP	—	3–0
3	Robert Sollie (NOR)	2	0	2	1	1	1–3 PP	0–3 PO	—

Source: Japan Wrestling

==== Pool 6 ====
Pos	Athlete	Pld	W	L	CP	TP	FRA	BLR	NED
1	Djamel Ainaoui (FRA)	2	2	0	7	13	—	3–2	10–0
2	Yury Khrabrou (BLR)	2	1	1	5	13	1–3 PP	—	11–1
3	Arash Rayhaniasl (NED)	2	0	2	1	1	0–4 ST	1–4 SP	—

Source: Japan Wrestling

==== Pool 7 ====
Pos	Athlete	Pld	W	L	CP	TP	UZB	TUR	PER
1	Dilshod Aripov (UZB)	2	2	0	7	20	—	7–4	13–0
2	Şeref Tüfenk (TUR)	2	1	1	4	10	1–3 PP	—	6–4
3	Sidney Guzman (PER)	2	0	2	1	4	0–4 ST	1–3 PP	—

Source: Japan Wrestling

==== Pool 8 ====
Pos	Athlete	Pld	W	L	CP	TP	ROM	AUS	POL
1	Marian Sandu (ROM)	2	2	0	6	15	—	6–1	9–0
2	Plamen Tchoukanov (AUS)	2	1	1	4	10	1–3 PP	—	9–0
3	Julian Kwit (POL)	2	0	2	0	0	0–3 PO	0–3 PO	—

Source: Japan Wrestling

==== Pool 9 ====
Pos	Athlete	Pld	W	L	CP	TP	ARM	YUG	BRA
1	Karen Mnatsakanyan (ARM)	2	2	0	6	17	—	7–5	10–1
2	Norbert Futo (YUG)	2	1	1	5	19	1–3 PP	—	14–0
3	Iuri Estevão (BRA)	2	0	2	1	1	1–3 PP	0–4 ST	—

Source: Japan Wrestling

==== Pool 10 ====
Pos	Athlete	Pld	W	L	CP	TP	KOR	CAN	AZE
1	Kang Kyung-il (KOR)	2	2	0	7	19	—	10–0	9–0
2	Saeed Azarbayjani (CAN)	2	1	1	3	13	0–4 ST	—	13–5
3	Nuraddin Rajabov (AZE)	2	0	2	1	5	0–3 PO	1–3 PP	—

Source: Japan Wrestling

==== Pool 11 ====
Pos	Athlete	Pld	W	L	CP	TP	JPN	IND	POR
1	Makoto Sasamoto (JPN)	2	2	0	7	21	—	10–0 Fall	11–2
2	Ravinder Singh (IND)	2	1	1	3	5	0–4 TO	—	5–2
3	Hugo Passos (POR)	2	0	2	2	4	1–3 PP	1–3 PP	—

Source: Japan Wrestling

==== Pool 12 ====
Pos	Athlete	Pld	W	L	CP	TP	BUL	HUN	GEO	GER
1	Armen Nazaryan (BUL)	3	3	0	11	25	—	4–0	12–1	9–7 Ret
2	István Majoros (HUN)	3	2	1	7	6	0–3 PO	—	6–3	WO
3	Irakli Chochua (GEO)	3	1	2	6	4	1–4 SP	1–3 PP	—	WO
4	Alfred Ter-Mkrtchyan (GER)	3	0	3	0	7	0–4 PA	0–4 PA	0–4 PA	—

Source: Japan Wrestling

=== Knockout round ===
Round of 16
Roberto Monzón (CUB)	9
Petr Švehla (CZE)	0
Ali Ashkani (IRI)	6
Jim Gruenwald (USA)	3
Ivan Alexandrov (ISR)	0
Djamel Ainaoui (FRA)	4
Dilshod Aripov (UZB)	14
Marian Sandu (ROM)	3

Quarterfinals
Roberto Monzón (CUB)	6
Ali Ashkani (IRI)	2
Djamel Ainaoui (FRA)	2
Dilshod Aripov (UZB)	3
Karen Mnatsakanyan (ARM)	4
Kang Kyung-il (KOR)	0
Makoto Sasamoto (JPN)	2
Armen Nazaryan (BUL)	8

Semifinals
Roberto Monzón (CUB)	2
Dilshod Aripov (UZB)	4
Karen Mnatsakanyan (ARM)	5
Armen Nazaryan (BUL)	4

Final
Dilshod Aripov (UZB)	6
Karen Mnatsakanyan (ARM)	3
Bronze medal match
Roberto Monzón (CUB)	3
Armen Nazaryan (BUL)	1
