= Wrestling at the 2008 Summer Olympics – Men's Greco-Roman 60 kg =

Men's Greco-Roman 60 kg at the Games of the XXIX Olympiad
- Venue: China Agricultural University Gymnasium
- Date: 12 August 2008
- Competitors: 20 from 20 nations

Medalists
1st place, gold medalist(s)		Islambek Albiev	Russia
2nd place, silver medalist(s)		Nurbakyt Tengizbayev	Kazakhstan
3rd place, bronze medalist(s)		Ruslan Tyumenbayev	Kyrgyzstan
3rd place, bronze medalist(s)		Sheng Jiang	China

Men's Greco-Roman 60 kilograms competition at the 2008 Summer Olympics in Beijing, China, was held on August 12 at the China Agricultural University Gymnasium.

This Greco-Roman wrestling competition consists of a single-elimination tournament, with a repechage used to determine the winner of two bronze medals. The two finalists face off for gold and silver medals. Each wrestler who loses to one of the two finalists moves into the repechage, culminating in a pair of bronze medal matches featuring the semifinal losers each facing the remaining repechage opponent from their half of the bracket.

Each bout consists of up to three rounds, lasting two minutes apiece. The wrestler who scores more points in each round is the winner of that rounds; the bout ends when one wrestler has won two rounds (and thus the match).

== Schedule ==
All times are China Standard Time (UTC+08:00)

Date	Time	Event
12 August 2008	09:30	Qualification rounds
12 August 2008	16:00	Repechage
12 August 2008	17:00	Finals

== Results ==
=== Final ===
Final
Islambek Albiev (RUS)	2	4
Vitaliy Rahimov (AZE)	0	0

=== Top half ===
Qualifications

1/8 finals
Islambek Albiev (RUS)	6	6
Soner Sucu (TUR)	0	0
Roberto Monzón (CUB)	2	3	6
Sébastien Hidalgo (FRA)	1	3	0
Davor Štefanek (SRB)	1	1
Dilshod Aripov (UZB)	1	4
Ruslan Tyumenbayev (KGZ)	3	4
Jarkko Ala-Huikku (FIN)	1	0

Quarterfinals
Islambek Albiev (RUS)	6	2
Roberto Monzón (CUB)	0	0
Dilshod Aripov (UZB)	0	3	1
Ruslan Tyumenbayev (KGZ)	2	0	2

Semifinals
Islambek Albiev (RUS)	6	4
Ruslan Tyumenbayev (KGZ)	0	0

=== Bottom half ===
Qualifications
Sheng Jiang (CHN)	0	1
Vitaliy Rahimov (AZE)	3	2
Eusebiu Diaconu (ROU)	1	1	1
Ashraf El-Gharably (EGY)	1	1	1
Makoto Sasamoto (JPN)	2	3
Karen Mnatsakanyan (ARM)	1	0
Armen Nazaryan (BUL)	1	4	5
David Bedinadze (GEO)	1	1	0

1/8 finals
Stig-André Berge (NOR)	0	0
Nurbakyt Tengizbayev (KAZ)	3	3
Jung Ji-hyun (KOR)	3	6
Yury Dubinin (BLR)	0	0
Vitaliy Rahimov (AZE)	1	0	4
Eusebiu Diaconu (ROU)	1	3	2
Makoto Sasamoto (JPN)	4	0	0
Armen Nazaryan (BUL)	0	2	2

Quarterfinals
Nurbakyt Tengizbayev (KAZ)	1	3	2
Jung Ji-hyun (KOR)	2	2	0
Vitaliy Rahimov (AZE)	0	3	7
Armen Nazaryan (BUL)	2	0	0

Semifinals
Nurbakyt Tengizbayev (KAZ)	1	0
Vitaliy Rahimov (AZE)	1	7

=== Repechage ===
Repechage round 1
Sheng Jiang (CHN)	5	1	2
Eusebiu Diaconu (ROU)	1	3	1

Repechage round 2
Soner Sucu (TUR)	3	2	1
Roberto Monzón (CUB)	1	4	1
Sheng Jiang (CHN)	4	6
Armen Nazaryan (BUL)	1	0

Bronze medals
Roberto Monzón (CUB)	0	0
Ruslan Tyumenbayev (KGZ)	6	3
Sheng Jiang (CHN)	1	2	0
Nurbakyt Tengizbayev (KAZ)	4	1	3

== Final standing ==
Rank	Athlete
1st place, gold medalist(s)	Islambek Albiev (RUS)
2nd place, silver medalist(s)	Nurbakyt Tengizbayev (KAZ)
3rd place, bronze medalist(s)	Ruslan Tyumenbayev (KGZ)
3rd place, bronze medalist(s)	Sheng Jiang (CHN)
5	Roberto Monzón (CUB)
6	Armen Nazaryan (BUL)
7	Eusebiu Diaconu (ROU)
8	Jung Ji-hyun (KOR)
9	Makoto Sasamoto (JPN)
10	Dilshod Aripov (UZB)
11	Soner Sucu (TUR)
12	Sébastien Hidalgo (FRA)
13	Ashraf El-Gharably (EGY)
14	Davor Štefanek (SRB)
15	David Bedinadze (GEO)
16	Karen Mnatsakanyan (ARM)
17	Jarkko Ala-Huikku (FIN)
18	Stig-André Berge (NOR)
19	Yury Dubinin (BLR)
DQ	Vitaliy Rahimov (AZE)

- Vitaliy Rahimov of Azerbaijan originally won the silver medal, but he was disqualified after he tested positive for Chlorodehydromethyltestosterone.
