= Aleksey Shevtsov =

Russian Greco-Roman wrestler

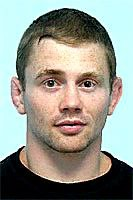
- 2023

Personal information
- Full name: Aleksey Viktorovich Shevtsov
- Nationality: Russian
- Born: 29 January 1979 (age 47) Fergana, Uzbek SSR, Soviet Union
- Height: 1.63 m (5 ft 4 in)
- Weight: 60 kg (132 lb)

Sport
- Style: Greco-Roman
- Club: Moscow Academy of Combat Sports
- Coach: Yevgeny Peremishin
Medal record
Men's Greco-Roman wrestling
Representing Russia
European Championships
Bronze medal – third place	2005 Varna	60 kg

Aleksey Viktorovich Shevtsov (Russian: Алексéй Ви́кторович Шéвцов; born January 29, 1979) is a retired amateur Russian Greco-Roman wrestler, who competed in the men's lightweight category. He represented Russia in two editions of the Olympic Games (2000 and 2004), and later capped off his wrestling career with a bronze medal in the 60-kg division at the 2005 European Championships in Varna, Bulgaria. Shevtsov also trained as a member of the wrestling team at the Moscow Academy of Combat Sports in Moscow, under his personal coach Yevgeny Peremishin.

Shevtsov made his official debut at the 2000 Summer Olympics in Sydney, where he competed in the men's bantamweight category (54 kg). He lost his opening match 5–10 to North Korea's Kang Yong-gyun, but vowed his own revenge to tame three-time Olympic veteran Marian Sandu of Romania by a rigid 11–8 verdict. Placing second in the prelim pool due to technical point system and twelfth overall, Shevtsov's performance was not enough to put him through to the medal rounds.

At the 2004 Summer Olympics in Athens, Shevtsov qualified for his second Russian squad, as a 25-year-old, in the men's 60 kg class. Earlier in the process, he finished fourth at the Olympic Qualification Tournament in Novi Sad, Serbia and Montenegro to guarantee his spot on the Russian wrestling team. Unlike his previous Olympics, Shevtsov dominated the prelim pool with a pair of remarkably strong victories over neighboring China's Ailinuer (4–2) and Germany's Jurij Kohl (7–0) to secure him a place for the medal rounds. Shevtsov edged past Kazakhstan's Nurlan Koizhaiganov in the quarterfinals with a 3–1 decision, before being overwhelmed by Cuba's Roberto Monzón in the semifinal match 3–6. Shevtsov challenged against reigning Olympic champion Armen Nazaryan of Bulgaria for the bronze medal, but quickly fell behind him by a single-point deficit with a 3–4 decision, dropping the Russian to fourth.

In 2005, Shevtsov recovered from an Olympic setback to flourish his wrestling career with a bronze medal over Georgia's David Bedinadze at the European Championships.
