= Wrestling at the 2002 Asian Games – Men's Greco-Roman 60 kg =

Men's Greco-Roman 60 kg at the 2002 Asian Games
- Venue: Yangsan Gymnasium
- Date: 3–4 October 2002
- Competitors: 16 from 16 nations

Medalists
gold medal	Kang Kyung-il	South Korea
silver medal	Dilshod Aripov	Uzbekistan
bronze medal	Makoto Sasamoto	Japan

The men's Greco-Roman 60 kilograms wrestling competition at the 2002 Asian Games in Busan was held on 3 October and 4 October at the Yangsan Gymnasium.

The competition held with an elimination system of three or four wrestlers in each pool, with the winners qualify for the quarterfinals, semifinals and final by way of direct elimination.

== Schedule ==
All times are Korea Standard Time (UTC+09:00)

Date	Time	Event
Thursday, 3 October 2002	10:00	Round 1
Thursday, 3 October 2002	16:00	Round 2
Friday, 4 October 2002	10:00	Round 3
Friday, 4 October 2002	10:00	1/4 finals
Friday, 4 October 2002	16:00	1/2 finals
Friday, 4 October 2002	16:00	Finals

== Results ==
=== Preliminary ===
==== Pool 1 ====
Pos	Athlete	Pld	W	L	CP	TP	Qualification
1	Nurlan Koizhaiganov (KAZ)	2	2	0	8	25	Knockout round
2	Wang Shugang (CHN)	2	1	1	5	11	
3	Zakaria Nashed (SYR)	2	0	2	0	0	

Source: Report

	Score		CP
Nurlan Koizhaiganov (KAZ)	12–0	Zakaria Nashed (SYR)	4–0 ST
Wang Shugang (CHN)	1–13	Nurlan Koizhaiganov (KAZ)	1–4 SP
Zakaria Nashed (SYR)	0–10	Wang Shugang (CHN)	0–4 ST

==== Pool 2 ====
Pos	Athlete	Pld	W	L	CP	TP	Qualification
1	Ali Ashkani (IRI)	2	2	0	7	14	Knockout round
2	Döwletberdi Mamedow (TKM)	2	1	1	5	12	
3	Ahmed Al-Mandi (YEM)	2	0	2	0	0	

Source: Report

	Score		CP
Ahmed Al-Mandi (YEM)	0–10	Döwletberdi Mamedow (TKM)	0–4 ST
Ali Ashkani (IRI)	11–0	Ahmed Al-Mandi (YEM)	4–0 ST
Döwletberdi Mamedow (TKM)	2–3	Ali Ashkani (IRI)	1–3 PP

==== Pool 3 ====
Pos	Athlete	Pld	W	L	CP	TP	Qualification
1	Dilshod Aripov (UZB)	2	2	0	7	19	Knockout round
2	Cha Kwang-su (PRK)	2	1	1	5	9	
3	Rabee Fora (PLE)	2	0	2	0	0	

Source: Report

	Score		CP
Dilshod Aripov (UZB)	9–0 Fall	Rabee Fora (PLE)	4–0 TO
Cha Kwang-su (PRK)	4–10	Dilshod Aripov (UZB)	1–3 PP
Rabee Fora (PLE)	0–5 Fall	Cha Kwang-su (PRK)	0–4 TO

==== Pool 4 ====
Pos	Athlete	Pld	W	L	CP	TP	Qualification
1	Kang Kyung-il (KOR)	2	2	0	7	15	Knockout round
2	Nurjan Jusupov (KGZ)	2	1	1	4	14	
3	Abdullatif Abdulla (QAT)	2	0	2	0	0	

Source: Report

	Score		CP
Nurjan Jusupov (KGZ)	0–4	Kang Kyung-il (KOR)	0–3 PO
Abdullatif Abdulla (QAT)	0–14 Fall	Nurjan Jusupov (KGZ)	0–4 TO
Kang Kyung-il (KOR)	11–0	Abdullatif Abdulla (QAT)	4–0 ST

==== Pool 5 ====
Pos	Athlete	Pld	W	L	CP	TP	Qualification
1	Makoto Sasamoto (JPN)	3	3	0	12	32	Knockout round
2	Ravinder Singh (IND)	3	2	1	8	22	
3	Badamsaikhany Enkhtör (MGL)	3	1	2	5	4	
4	Melchor Tumasis (PHI)	3	0	3	0	4	

Source: Report

	Score		CP
Badamsaikhany Enkhtör (MGL)	1–11	Makoto Sasamoto (JPN)	1–4 SP
Ravinder Singh (IND)	12–0	Melchor Tumasis (PHI)	4–0 ST
Badamsaikhany Enkhtör (MGL)	0–10	Ravinder Singh (IND)	0–4 ST
Makoto Sasamoto (JPN)	10–0 Fall	Melchor Tumasis (PHI)	4–0 TO
Badamsaikhany Enkhtör (MGL)	3–4 Fall	Melchor Tumasis (PHI)	4–0 TO
Makoto Sasamoto (JPN)	11–0 Fall	Ravinder Singh (IND)	4–0 TO

=== Knockout round ===
1/4 finals
Nurlan Koizhaiganov (KAZ)	4
Ali Ashkani (IRI)	1

1/2 finals
Nurlan Koizhaiganov (KAZ)	4
Dilshod Aripov (UZB)	6
Kang Kyung-il (KOR)	3
Makoto Sasamoto (JPN)	1

Final
Dilshod Aripov (UZB)	1
Kang Kyung-il (KOR)	2
3rd–4th place
Nurlan Koizhaiganov (KAZ)	1
Makoto Sasamoto (JPN)	2

== Final standing ==
Rank	Athlete
1st place, gold medalist(s)	Kang Kyung-il (KOR)
2nd place, silver medalist(s)	Dilshod Aripov (UZB)
3rd place, bronze medalist(s)	Makoto Sasamoto (JPN)
4	Nurlan Koizhaiganov (KAZ)
5	Ali Ashkani (IRI)
6	Ravinder Singh (IND)
7	Döwletberdi Mamedow (TKM)
8	Wang Shugang (CHN)
9	Cha Kwang-su (PRK)
10	Badamsaikhany Enkhtör (MGL)
11	Nurjan Jusupov (KGZ)
12	Melchor Tumasis (PHI)
13	Rabee Fora (PLE)
14	Zakaria Nashed (SYR)
15	Abdullatif Abdulla (QAT)
16	Ahmed Al-Mandi (YEM)
