= 2014 World Wrestling Championships – Men's Greco-Roman 66 kg =

Men's Greco-Roman 66 kg at the 2014 World Championships
- Venue: Gymnastics Sport Palace
- Dates: 13 September 2014
- Competitors: 38 from 38 nations

Medalists
gold medal	Davor Štefanek	Serbia
silver medal	Omid Norouzi	Iran
bronze medal	Tamás Lőrincz	Hungary
bronze medal	Edgaras Venckaitis	Lithuania

The men's Greco-Roman 66 kilograms is a competition featured at the 2014 World Wrestling Championships, and was held in Tashkent, Uzbekistan on 13 September 2014.

== Results ==
Legend

- C — Won by 3 cautions given to the opponent
- F — Won by fall

=== Finals ===
Semifinals		Final
Tamás Lőrincz (HUN)	1
Omid Norouzi (IRI)	4	Omid Norouzi (IRI)	3
Davor Štefanek (SRB)	5	Davor Štefanek (SRB)	7
Hasan Aliyev (AZE)	3

=== Top half ===
==== Section 1 ====
Round of 64

Round of 32
Mihran Harutyunyan (ARM)	8
Mathias Günther (SWE)	0
Atakan Yüksel (TUR)	4
Oh Sang-hun (KOR)	0
Ismael Navarro (ESP)	0
Adam Kurak (RUS)	9
Tamás Lőrincz (HUN)	9
Artak Margaryan (FRA)	0

Round of 16
Mihran Harutyunyan (ARM)	7
Atakan Yüksel (TUR)	1
Adam Kurak (RUS)	2
Tamás Lőrincz (HUN)	6

Quarterfinals
Mihran Harutyunyan (ARM)	4
Tamás Lőrincz (HUN)	6

==== Section 2 ====
Round of 64

Round of 32
Davide Cascavilla (ITA)	0
Omid Norouzi (IRI)	8
Frank Stäbler (GER)	4^{C}
Atai Koichukulov (KGZ)	0
Aibek Yensekhanov (KAZ)	3
Konstantin Stas (BUL)	5
Grzegorz Wanke (POL)	1
Yaraslau Kardash (BLR)	7

Round of 16
Omid Norouzi (IRI)	4
Frank Stäbler (GER)	3
Konstantin Stas (BUL)	14
Yaraslau Kardash (BLR)	12

Quarterfinals
Omid Norouzi (IRI)	3
Konstantin Stas (BUL)	2

=== Bottom half ===
==== Section 3 ====
Round of 64

Round of 32
Edgaras Venckaitis (LTU)	3
Dominik Etlinger (CRO)	3
István Lévai (SVK)	5
Georgian Carpen (ROU)	4
Hugo Passos (POR)	0
Davor Štefanek (SRB)	8
Su Ersa (CHN)	8
Didar Amannazarow (TKM)	0

Round of 16
Edgaras Venckaitis (LTU)	6
István Lévai (SVK)	5
Davor Štefanek (SRB)	7^{C}
Su Ersa (CHN)	0

Quarterfinals
Edgaras Venckaitis (LTU)	3
Davor Štefanek (SRB)	4

==== Section 4 ====
Round of 64
Revaz Lashkhi (GEO)	5
Bobirbek Zaylobidinov (UZB)	0
Bryce Saddoris (USA)	6^{F}
Loiqi Amirkhonzoda (TJK)	2
Donior Islamov (MDA)	7
Marius Thommesen (NOR)	5
Hideyuki Otoizumi (JPN)	5
Fredrik Bjerrehuus (DEN)	0
Hasan Aliyev (AZE)	4
Tero Välimäki (FIN)	0
Matouš Morbitzer (CZE)	2
Sandeep Tulsi Yadav (IND)	5

Round of 32
Benedikt Puffer (AUT)	4
Denys Demyankov (UKR)	7
Revaz Lashkhi (GEO)	1
Bryce Saddoris (USA)	0
Donior Islamov (MDA)	0
Hideyuki Otoizumi (JPN)	2^{C}
Hasan Aliyev (AZE)	6
Sandeep Tulsi Yadav (IND)	5

Round of 16
Denys Demyankov (UKR)	0
Revaz Lashkhi (GEO)	4
Hideyuki Otoizumi (JPN)	0
Hasan Aliyev (AZE)	6

Quarterfinals
Revaz Lashkhi (GEO)	0
Hasan Aliyev (AZE)	5

=== Repechage ===
Repechage round 2
Davide Cascavilla (ITA)	0
Frank Stäbler (GER)	10
Hugo Passos (POR)	1
Su Ersa (CHN)	2

Repechage round 3
Frank Stäbler (GER)	4
Konstantin Stas (BUL)	1
Su Ersa (CHN)	1
Edgaras Venckaitis (LTU)	4

Bronze medals
Frank Stäbler (GER)	0
Tamás Lőrincz (HUN)	5
Edgaras Venckaitis (LTU)	4^{F}
Hasan Aliyev (AZE)	0
