= Wrestling at the 2004 Summer Olympics – Men's Greco-Roman 60 kg =

Men's Greco-Roman 60 kg at the Games of the XXVIII Olympiad
- Venue: Ano Liosia Olympic Hall
- Date: 25–26 August 2004
- Competitors: 22 from 22 nations

Medalists
1st place, gold medalist(s)		Jung Ji-hyun	South Korea
2nd place, silver medalist(s)		Roberto Monzón	Cuba
3rd place, bronze medalist(s)		Armen Nazaryan	Bulgaria

The men's Greco-Roman 60 kilograms at the 2004 Summer Olympics as part of the wrestling program were held at the Ano Liosia Olympic Hall, August 25 to August 26.

The competition held with an elimination system of three or four wrestlers in each pool, with the winners qualify for the quarterfinals, semifinals and final by way of direct elimination.

== Schedule ==
All times are Eastern European Summer Time (UTC+03:00)

Date	Time	Event
25 August 2004	09:30	Round 1
25 August 2004	09:30	Round 2
25 August 2004	17:30	Round 3
26 August 2004	09:30	Qualification
26 August 2004	09:30	Semifinals
26 August 2004	17:30	Finals

== Results ==
=== Elimination pools ===
==== Pool 1 ====
Pos	Athlete	Pld	W	L	CP	TP	Qualification
1	Jung Ji-hyun (KOR)	2	2	0	6	13	Knockout round
2	Vitaliy Rahimov (AZE)	2	1	1	3	4	
3	Włodzimierz Zawadzki (POL)	2	0	2	2	4	

Source: Official website

	Score		CP
Włodzimierz Zawadzki (POL)	2–10	Jung Ji-hyun (KOR)	1–3 PP
Vitaliy Rahimov (AZE)	4–2	Włodzimierz Zawadzki (POL)	3–1 PP
Jung Ji-hyun (KOR)	3–0	Vitaliy Rahimov (AZE)	3–0 PO

==== Pool 2 ====
Pos	Athlete	Pld	W	L	CP	TP	Qualification
1	Eusebiu Diaconu (ROM)	2	2	0	7	13	Knockout round
2	Jim Gruenwald (USA)	2	1	1	5	13	
3	Hugo Passos (POR)	2	0	2	0	7	

Source: Official website

	Score		CP
Hugo Passos (POR)	0–10	Eusebiu Diaconu (ROM)	0–4 ST
Jim Gruenwald (USA)	12–7 Fall	Hugo Passos (POR)	4–0 TO
Eusebiu Diaconu (ROM)	3–1	Jim Gruenwald (USA)	3–1 PP

==== Pool 3 ====
Pos	Athlete	Pld	W	L	CP	TP	Qualification
1	Armen Nazaryan (BUL)	2	2	0	6	15	Knockout round
2	Ashraf El-Gharably (EGY)	2	1	1	4	15	
3	Oleksandr Khvoshch (UKR)	2	0	2	2	4	

Source: Official website

	Score		CP
Armen Nazaryan (BUL)	7–3	Ashraf El-Gharably (EGY)	3–1 PP
Oleksandr Khvoshch (UKR)	1–8	Armen Nazaryan (BUL)	1–3 PP
Ashraf El-Gharably (EGY)	12–3	Oleksandr Khvoshch (UKR)	3–1 PP

==== Pool 4 ====
Pos	Athlete	Pld	W	L	CP	TP	Qualification
1	Makoto Sasamoto (JPN)	2	2	0	7	20	Knockout round
2	Sidney Guzman (PER)	2	1	1	3	3	
3	Davor Štefanek (SCG)	2	0	2	2	2	

Source: Official website

	Score		CP
Sidney Guzman (PER)	0–11	Makoto Sasamoto (JPN)	0–4 ST
Davor Štefanek (SCG)	1–3	Sidney Guzman (PER)	1–3 PP
Makoto Sasamoto (JPN)	9–1	Davor Štefanek (SCG)	3–1 PP

==== Pool 5 ====
Pos	Athlete	Pld	W	L	CP	TP	Qualification
1	Nurlan Koizhaiganov (KAZ)	2	2	0	6	14	Knockout round
2	Akaki Chachua (GEO)	2	1	1	5	16	
3	Paolo Fucile (ITA)	2	0	2	0	0	

Source: Official website

	Score		CP
Paolo Fucile (ITA)	0–10	Akaki Chachua (GEO)	0–4 ST
Nurlan Koizhaiganov (KAZ)	7–0	Paolo Fucile (ITA)	3–0 PO
Akaki Chachua (GEO)	6–7	Nurlan Koizhaiganov (KAZ)	1–3 PP

==== Pool 6 ====
Pos	Athlete	Pld	W	L	CP	TP	Qualification
1	Aleksey Shevtsov (RUS)	2	2	0	6	11	Knockout round
2	Ailinuer (CHN)	2	1	1	4	5	
3	Jurij Kohl (GER)	2	0	2	1	2	

Source: Official website

	Score		CP
Ailinuer (CHN)	2–4	Aleksey Shevtsov (RUS)	1–3 PP
Jurij Kohl (GER)	2–3	Ailinuer (CHN)	1–3 PP
Aleksey Shevtsov (RUS)	7–0	Jurij Kohl (GER)	3–0 PO

==== Pool 7 ====
Pos	Athlete	Pld	W	L	CP	TP	Qualification
1	Roberto Monzón (CUB)	3	3	0	9	16	Knockout round
2	Şeref Tüfenk (TUR)	3	2	1	6	8	
3	Ali Ashkani (IRI)	3	1	2	5	8	
4	Christos Gikas (GRE)	3	0	3	1	1	

Source: Official website

	Score		CP
Christos Gikas (GRE)	0–5	Şeref Tüfenk (TUR)	0–3 PO
Roberto Monzón (CUB)	4–1	Ali Ashkani (IRI)	3–1 PP
Christos Gikas (GRE)	0–7	Roberto Monzón (CUB)	0–3 PO
Şeref Tüfenk (TUR)	3–1	Ali Ashkani (IRI)	3–1 PP
Christos Gikas (GRE)	1–6	Ali Ashkani (IRI)	1–3 PP
Şeref Tüfenk (TUR)	0–5	Roberto Monzón (CUB)	0–3 PO

=== Knockout round ===
Qualification
Jung Ji-hyun (KOR)	6
Eusebiu Diaconu (ROM)	0
Armen Nazaryan (BUL)	5
Makoto Sasamoto (JPN)	3
Nurlan Koizhaiganov (KAZ)	1
Aleksey Shevtsov (RUS)	3

Semifinals
Jung Ji-hyun (KOR)	3
Armen Nazaryan (BUL)	1
Aleksey Shevtsov (RUS)	3
Roberto Monzón (CUB)	6

Gold medal match
Jung Ji-hyun (KOR)	3
Roberto Monzón (CUB)	0
Bronze medal match
Armen Nazaryan (BUL)	4
Aleksey Shevtsov (RUS)	3

Classification 5–6
Makoto Sasamoto (JPN)	4
Nurlan Koizhaiganov (KAZ)	0

== Final standing ==
Rank	Athlete
1st place, gold medalist(s)	Jung Ji-hyun (KOR)
2nd place, silver medalist(s)	Roberto Monzón (CUB)
3rd place, bronze medalist(s)	Armen Nazaryan (BUL)
4	Aleksey Shevtsov (RUS)
5	Makoto Sasamoto (JPN)
6	Nurlan Koizhaiganov (KAZ)
7	Eusebiu Diaconu (ROM)
8	Şeref Tüfenk (TUR)
9	Akaki Chachua (GEO)
10	Jim Gruenwald (USA)
11	Ali Ashkani (IRI)
12	Ashraf El-Gharably (EGY)
13	Ailinuer (CHN)
14	Vitaliy Rahimov (AZE)
15	Sidney Guzman (PER)
16	Włodzimierz Zawadzki (POL)
17	Oleksandr Khvoshch (UKR)
18	Davor Štefanek (SCG)
19	Jurij Kohl (GER)
20	Christos Gikas (GRE)
21	Hugo Passos (POR)
22	Paolo Fucile (ITA)
