= 2015 World Wrestling Championships – Men's Greco-Roman 66 kg =

Men's Greco-Roman 66 kg at the 2015 World Championships
- Venue: Orleans Arena
- Dates: 7 September 2015
- Competitors: 48 from 48 nations

Medalists
gold medal	Frank Stäbler	Germany
silver medal	Ryu Han-su	South Korea
bronze medal	Davor Štefanek	Serbia
bronze medal	Artem Surkov	Russia

The men's Greco-Roman 66 kilograms is a competition featured at the 2015 World Wrestling Championships, and was held in Las Vegas, United States on 7 September 2015.

== Results ==
Legend

- F — Won by fall

=== Finals ===
Semifinals		Final
Davor Štefanek (SRB)	1
Frank Stäbler (GER)	5	Frank Stäbler (GER)	5
Mihran Harutyunyan (ARM)	4	Ryu Han-su (KOR)	1
Ryu Han-su (KOR)	4

=== Top half ===
==== Section 1 ====
Round of 64

Round of 32
Ismael Navarro (ESP)	9
André Feitosa (BRA)	0
Demeu Zhadrayev (KAZ)	2
Miguel Martínez (CUB)	0
Ruslan Tsarev (KGZ)	1
Davor Štefanek (SRB)	10
Daniel Cataraga (MDA)	8
Cristian Nova (BOL)	0

Round of 16
Ismael Navarro (ESP)	4
Demeu Zhadrayev (KAZ)	4
Davor Štefanek (SRB)	8
Daniel Cataraga (MDA)	1

Quarterfinals
Demeu Zhadrayev (KAZ)	3
Davor Štefanek (SRB)	4

==== Section 2 ====
Round of 64

Round of 32
Konstantin Stas (BUL)	3
Matouš Morbitzer (CZE)	1
Bryce Saddoris (USA)	3
Hugo Passos (POR)	0
Tarek Benaissa (ALG)	0
Frank Stäbler (GER)	8^{F}
Nicolas Christen (SUI)	0
Wuileixis Rivas (VEN)	7

Round of 16
Konstantin Stas (BUL)	3
Bryce Saddoris (USA)	6
Frank Stäbler (GER)	5
Wuileixis Rivas (VEN)	0

Quarterfinals
Bryce Saddoris (USA)	0
Frank Stäbler (GER)	5

=== Bottom half ===
==== Section 3 ====
Round of 64
Mihran Harutyunyan (ARM)	9
Jefrin Mejía (HON)	0
Vladimiros Matias (GRE)	16^{F}
Deepak Kumar (IND)	0
Tamás Lőrincz (HUN)	3
Edgaras Venckaitis (LTU)	0
Mikhail Siamionau (BLR)	3
Frunze Harutyunyan (SWE)	4
Denys Demyankov (UKR)	8
Pang Jin-chol (PRK)	0
István Lévai (SVK)	4
Mehdi Zeidvand (IRI)	0
Aleksandr Lokhov (UZB)	0
Abdulsamet Günal (TUR)	8
Shmagi Bolkvadze (GEO)	8
Jair Cuero (COL)	0

Round of 32
Mihran Harutyunyan (ARM)	9
Vladimiros Matias (GRE)	0
Tamás Lőrincz (HUN)	6^{F}
Frunze Harutyunyan (SWE)	0
Denys Demyankov (UKR)	9
István Lévai (SVK)	13
Abdulsamet Günal (TUR)	3
Shmagi Bolkvadze (GEO)	6

Round of 16
Mihran Harutyunyan (ARM)	4
Tamás Lőrincz (HUN)	1
István Lévai (SVK)	0
Shmagi Bolkvadze (GEO)	6

Quarterfinals
Mihran Harutyunyan (ARM)	10
Shmagi Bolkvadze (GEO)	1

==== Section 4 ====
Round of 64
Lowe Bingham (NRU)	0
Marius Thommesen (NOR)	10
Tero Välimäki (FIN)	4
Víctor Méndez (MEX)	0
Ryu Han-su (KOR)	7
Zheng Pan (CHN)	0
Artem Surkov (RUS)	2
Hasan Aliyev (AZE)	0
Mario Molina (PER)	0
Dominik Etlinger (CRO)	9
Khusrav Obloberdiev (TJK)	4
Benedikt Puffer (AUT)	4
Mateusz Bernatek (POL)	8
Davide Cascavilla (ITA)	0
Takeshi Izumi (JPN)	4
Lukas Thomas (NAM)	0

Round of 32
Marius Thommesen (NOR)	6
Tero Välimäki (FIN)	0
Ryu Han-su (KOR)	1
Artem Surkov (RUS)	0
Dominik Etlinger (CRO)	7
Benedikt Puffer (AUT)	0
Mateusz Bernatek (POL)	4
Takeshi Izumi (JPN)	3

Round of 16
Marius Thommesen (NOR)	0
Ryu Han-su (KOR)	6
Dominik Etlinger (CRO)	8
Mateusz Bernatek (POL)	1

Quarterfinals
Ryu Han-su (KOR)	3
Dominik Etlinger (CRO)	0

=== Repechage ===
Repechage round 1
Zheng Pan (CHN)	0
Artem Surkov (RUS)	6

Repechage round 2
Tarek Benaissa (ALG)	5
Wuileixis Rivas (VEN)	2
Artem Surkov (RUS)	9
Marius Thommesen (NOR)	0

Repechage round 3
Tarek Benaissa (ALG)	5
Bryce Saddoris (USA)	4
Artem Surkov (RUS)	8
Dominik Etlinger (CRO)	0

Bronze medals
Tarek Benaissa (ALG)	0
Davor Štefanek (SRB)	4
Artem Surkov (RUS)	6
Mihran Harutyunyan (ARM)	2
