= Sébastien Hidalgo =

French Greco-Roman wrestler

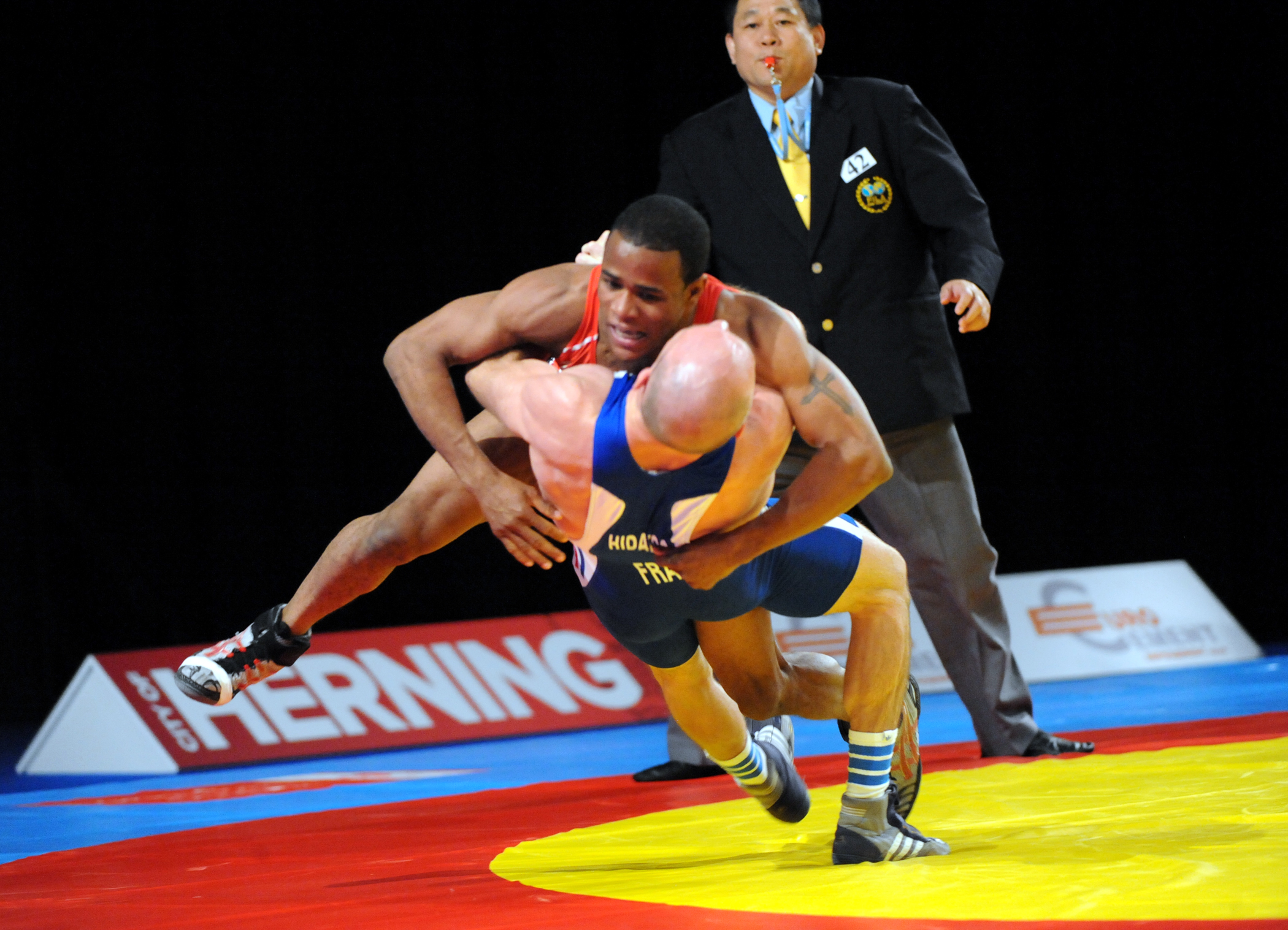
- Hidalgo at the 2009 World Wrestling Championships

Personal information
- Full name: Sébastien Serge Hidalgo
- Nationality: France
- Born: 11 January 1978 (age 48) Melun, France
- Height: 1.70 m (5 ft 7 in)
- Weight: 60 kg (132 lb)

Sport
- Sport: Wrestling
- Event: Greco-Roman
- Club: US Métro Paris
- Coached by: Patrice Mourier

Sébastien Serge Hidalgo (born 11 January 1978 in Melun) is a French amateur Greco-Roman wrestler in the men's lightweight category. He is a member of US Métro Paris and is coached and trained by Patrice Mourier.

At age 30, Hidalgo competed in the men's 60 kg class at the 2008 Summer Olympics in Beijing. He received a bye for the second preliminary round, before losing to the former Olympic silver medalist, Roberto Monzón of Cuba, with a technical score of 4–11.
