= Fucile =

Fucile is a surname. Notable people with the surname include:

- Jorge Fucile (born 1984), Uruguayan footballer
- Paolo Fucile (born 1981), Italian sport wrestler
