= Oleksandr Khvoshch =

Ukrainian wrestler (born 1981)

Personal information
- Full name: Oleksandr Petrovych Khvoshch
- Nationality: Ukraine
- Born: 1 October 1981 (age 44) Kadiivka, Ukrainian SSR, Soviet Union
- Height: 1.71 m (5 ft 7 1/2 in)
- Weight: 60 kg (132 lb)

Sport
- Style: Greco-Roman
- Club: Dynamo Zaporizhzhia
- Coach: Viktor Michienko
Medal record
Men's Greco-Roman wrestling
Representing Ukraine
European Championships
Silver medal – second place	2007 Sofia	66 kg
Bronze medal – third place	2006 Budapest	66 kg

Oleksandr Petrovych Khvoshch (Ukrainian: Олександр Петрович Хвощ; born 1 October 1981 in Kadiivka, Ukrainian SSR) is an amateur Ukrainian Greco-Roman wrestler, who competed in the men's lightweight category. He scored two career medals (one silver and one bronze) in the 60-kg division at the European Championships, and also represented his nation Ukraine at the 2004 Summer Olympics. Throughout his sporting career, Khvoshch has been training full-time as a member of the wrestling team for Dynamo Sports Club in Zaporizhzhia, under head coach Viktor Michienko.

Khvoshch qualified for the Ukrainian squad in the men's 60 kg class at the 2004 Summer Olympics in Athens. Earlier in the process, he placed ninth in the lightweight category from the 2003 World Wrestling Championships in Créteil, France to guarantee his spot on the Ukrainian wrestling team. Khvoshch lost two straight matches each to reigning world champion Armen Nazaryan of Bulgaria (1–8) and Egypt's Ashraf El-Gharably (3–12), leaving him on the bottom of the prelim pool and placing seventeenth in the final standings.
