= Adham Ahmed Saleh =

Egyptian Greco-Roman wrestler

Adham Ahmed Saleh (born June 27, 1993) is an Egyptian Greco-Roman wrestler. He competed at the 2016 Summer Olympics in the men's Greco-Roman 66 kg event, in which he was eliminated in the repechage by Ryu Han-su.
