= Wrestling at the 2016 Summer Olympics – Men's Greco-Roman 66 kg =

Men's Greco-Roman 66 kg at the Games of the XXXI Olympiad
- Venue: Carioca Arena 2
- Date: 16 August 2016
- Competitors: 18 from 18 nations

Medalists
1st place, gold medalist(s)		Davor Štefanek	Serbia
2nd place, silver medalist(s)		Mihran Harutyunyan	Armenia
3rd place, bronze medalist(s)		Shmagi Bolkvadze	Georgia
3rd place, bronze medalist(s)		Rasul Chunayev	Azerbaijan

Men's Greco-Roman 66 kilograms competition at the 2016 Summer Olympics in Rio de Janeiro, Brazil, took place on August 16 at the Carioca Arena 2 in Barra da Tijuca.

This Greco-Roman wrestling competition consists of a single-elimination tournament, with a repechage used to determine the winner of two bronze medals. The two finalists face off for gold and silver medals. Each wrestler who loses to one of the two finalists moves into the repechage, culminating in a pair of bronze medal matches featuring the semifinal losers each facing the remaining repechage opponent from their half of the bracket.

== Schedule ==
All times are Brasília Standard Time (UTC−03:00)

Date	Time	Event
16 August 2016	10:00	Qualification rounds
16 August 2016	16:00	Repechage
16 August 2016	17:00	Finals

== Results ==
Legend

- F — Won by fall

=== Final ===
Final
Davor Štefanek (SRB)	1
Mihran Harutyunyan (ARM)	1

=== Top half ===
Qualifications

1/8 finals
Frank Stäbler (GER)	3
Edgaras Venckaitis (LTU)	2
Tomohiro Inoue (JPN)	0
Davor Štefanek (SRB)	9
Tero Välimäki (FIN)	0
Shmagi Bolkvadze (GEO)	3
Omid Norouzi (IRI)	2
Wuileixis Rivas (VEN)	1

1/4 finals
Frank Stäbler (GER)	2
Davor Štefanek (SRB)	6
Shmagi Bolkvadze (GEO)	2
Omid Norouzi (IRI)	0

Semifinals
Davor Štefanek (SRB)	7^{F}
Shmagi Bolkvadze (GEO)	0

=== Bottom half ===
Qualifications
Islambek Albiev (RUS)	4
Ion Panait (ROU)	2
Miguel Martínez (CUB)	2
Rasul Chunayev (AZE)	4

1/8 finals
Ryu Han-su (KOR)	4
Tamás Lőrincz (HUN)	0
Mihran Harutyunyan (ARM)	9
Adham Ahmed Saleh (EGY)	0
Ruslan Tsarev (KGZ)	0
Tarek Benaissa (ALG)	6
Islambek Albiev (RUS)	2
Rasul Chunayev (AZE)	3

1/4 finals
Ryu Han-su (KOR)	1
Mihran Harutyunyan (ARM)	2
Tarek Benaissa (ALG)	2
Rasul Chunayev (AZE)	10

Semifinals
Mihran Harutyunyan (ARM)	4
Rasul Chunayev (AZE)	1

=== Repechage ===
Repechage round 2
Tomohiro Inoue (JPN)	2
Frank Stäbler (GER)	2
Adham Ahmed Saleh (EGY)	0
Ryu Han-su (KOR)	5

Bronze medals
Tomohiro Inoue (JPN)	0
Shmagi Bolkvadze (GEO)	1
Ryu Han-su (KOR)	0
Rasul Chunayev (AZE)	8

== Final standing ==
Rank	Athlete
1st place, gold medalist(s)	Davor Štefanek (SRB)
2nd place, silver medalist(s)	Mihran Harutyunyan (ARM)
3rd place, bronze medalist(s)	Shmagi Bolkvadze (GEO)
3rd place, bronze medalist(s)	Rasul Chunayev (AZE)
5	Tomohiro Inoue (JPN)
5	Ryu Han-su (KOR)
7	Frank Stäbler (GER)
8	Tarek Benaissa (ALG)
9	Islambek Albiev (RUS)
10	Omid Norouzi (IRI)
11	Edgaras Venckaitis (LTU)
12	Miguel Martínez (CUB)
12	Ion Panait (ROU)
14	Wuileixis Rivas (VEN)
15	Tero Välimäki (FIN)
16	Tamás Lőrincz (HUN)
17	Ruslan Tsarev (KGZ)
18	Adham Ahmed Saleh (EGY)
