= Jim Gruenwald =

American Greco-Roman wrestler (born 1970)

Personal information
- Full name: James Matthew Gruenwald
- Born: June 9, 1970 (age 56) Milwaukee, Wisconsin, U.S.
- Height: 5 ft 4 in (163 cm)
- Weight: 60 kg (132 lb)

Sport
- Style: Greco-Roman
- Club: Sunkist Kids Wrestling Club
- College team: Maranatha Baptist
- Coach: Anatoly Petrosyan; Momir Petković
Medal record
Men's Greco-Roman wrestling
Representing the United States
Pan American Games
Bronze medal – third place	2003 Santo Domingo	60 kg

James Matthew Gruenwald (born June 9, 1970) is a retired amateur American Greco-Roman wrestler, who competed in the men's lightweight category. He won three U.S. national titles (2003–2004, 2008), picked up a bronze medal in the 60-kg division at the 2003 Pan American Games, and represented the United States in two editions of the Olympic Games (2000 and 2004), finishing sixth in Sydney and tenth in Athens respectively. Since his sporting career ended in late 2004, Gruenwald served as an assistant coach for the Greco-Roman wrestling team at the United States Olympic Training Center in Marquette, Michigan from 2005 - 2009, and currently, heads the Wheaton College wrestling program in Illinois.

== Career ==
=== Early years ===
Gruenwald began his sporting career as a stellar high school wrestler at Greendale High School in Wisconsin. He placed 2nd in 1986 and 1988 and won a state championship title in 1987. Gruenwald won a Cadet National title in Greco Roman wrestling and placed second at the 1988 Junior Nationals to rival Dennis Hall. After graduating from high school in 1988, Gruenwald attended the Maranatha Baptist University in Watertown, Wisconsin, where he trained and competed for the wrestling team coached by 1972 Olympic champion Ben Peterson.

While wrestling for Maranatha, Gruenwald compiled a 154–19 overall record in his four-year career. He claimed three titles (one at 126 pound weight class and two at the 134 pound weight class), at the National Christian College Athletic Association (NCCAA) Championships, which held his distinction of being named the Most Valuable Player twice during the 1989 and 1991 season. In 1994, Gruenwald graduated from Maranatha with a bachelor's degree in secondary math education, and then taught at Hilltop Baptist School in Colorado for 12 years before he moved to Michigan in 2005.

Gruenwald's career blossomed in Greco-Roman wrestling, when he became a resident athlete for the United States Olympic Training Center in Colorado Springs, Colorado in 1993, and later trained for the wrestling squad under head coaches: 1985 Greco Roman World Champion Mike Houck, 1984 Greco Roman Olympic Champion Steve Fraser, Anatoly Petrosyan and 1976 Olympic Greco Roman Champion Momir Petković from the former Yugoslavia.

=== Greco-Roman wrestling ===
For many years, Gruenwald labored in the obscurity of his longtime rival Dennis Hall, who made the U.S. wrestling team at the 1992 and 1996 Summer Olympics. His breakthrough in the sporting scene came in 2000, when he upset Hall from the Olympic Trials to earn his spot on the Olympic squad.

Gruenwald made his official debut at the 2000 Summer Olympics in Sydney, where he competed in the men's bantamweight category (58 kg). He dominated the field by beating Armenia's Karen Mnatsakanyan (4–3) and Belarus' Igor Petrenko (4–0) in the prelim pool to secure a place in the next round. Gruenwald lost the quarterfinal match to Chinese wrestler and eventual bronze medalist Sheng Zetian with a superb 11–1 verdict, and could not hold enough to edge Iran's Ali Ashkani off the mat by a tough 3–2 score in the fifth-place match, dropping him to sixth.

After his first Olympics, Gruenwald proved particularly successful in his career with two U.S. national titles (2003 and 2004) and obtained a World Cup series trophy in 2002, reaching into the top spot for his weight class in the wrestling team. He also reeled off three-straight top-ten finishes at the World Championships, and then captured a bronze medal in the 60-kg class at the 2003 Pan American Games in Santo Domingo, Dominican Republic.

Gruenwald emerged himself as a top medal favorite at the 2003 World Wrestling Championships in Créteil, France, where he placed fourth in men's lightweight division. He withdrew from the bronze medal match against Romania's Eusebiu Diaconu with a shoulder injury, after losing to Bulgarian wrestler and double Olympic champion Armen Nazaryan in an astounding semifinal bout.

Gruenwald entered the 2004 Summer Olympics in Athens, as the oldest member of the U.S. wrestling team (aged 34), in the men's 60 kg class. Earlier in the process, he finished fourth at the World Championships that left him injured and empty-handed, and then guaranteed a spot on the U.S. team from the Olympic Trials. Gruenwald pinned Portugal's Hugo Passos with only nineteen seconds left in his opening match, but fell behind Romania's Eusebiu Diaconu by a 3–1 decision to close the pool round. Unlike his previous Games, Gruenwald's performance was not enough to advance him to the quarterfinals, placing tenth in the final standings.

In late 2004, Gruenwald made his decision to take a temporary leave from the competition to pursue on his coaching career, but came back three years later in an attempt to qualify for his third Olympic bid and a spot on the U.S. Olympic team at 60 kg class. He claimed his third career title in the same division at the 2008 U.S. Open, but suffered a dislocated shoulder in his opening match against Azerbaijan's Vitaliy Rahimov at the Olympic Qualification Tournament in Rome, Italy, ending his bid to compete for the 2008 Summer Olympics. Because of sustained injuries, Gruenwald officially announced his retirement from competitive wrestling.

=== Coaching ===
Since joining the United States Olympic Training Center in 1993, Gruenwald had a number of certifications in his coaching career. In the summer of 2005, he moved to Northern Michigan University in Marquette, Michigan to work with head coach Ivan Ivanov for the USOEC Resident Program.

In 2009, Gruenwald left the Olympic program to become the current head coach for the Thunder's wrestling team at Wheaton College in Illinois.

== Personal life ==
Gruenwald currently resides in Wheaton, Illinois with his wife Rachel and their seven children: son Adin and six daughters Arwyn, Ava, Autumn, Aleyse, Ashley, and Amber. He also enjoys reading, hunting, fishing and playing computer games in his spare time.
