= Mihran Harutyunyan =

Armenian-Russian wrestler

Personal information
- Full name: Mihran Ediki Harutyunyan
- Nationality: Armenian; Russian
- Born: March 25, 1989 (age 37) Vagharshapat, Armenian SSR, Soviet Union
- Height: 1.66 m (5 ft 5 in)
- Weight: 67 kg (148 lb)

Sport
- Country: Armenia; Russia (former)
- Sport: Wrestling
- Event: Greco-Roman
- Coached by: Aram Sarkisyan, Ruben Tatulyan
Medal record
Representing Armenia
Olympic Games
| Silver medal – second place | 2016 Rio de Janeiro | 66 kg |
European Games
| Silver medal – second place | 2015 Baku | 66 kg |
Representing Russia
Golden Grand Prix Ivan Poddubny
| Silver medal – second place | 2009 Tyumen | 66 kg |
| Silver medal – second place | 2010 Tyumen | 66 kg |
| Silver medal – second place | 2011 Tyumen | 66 kg |

Mihran Ediki Harutyunyan (Armenian: Միհրան Էդիկի Հարությունյան, Russian: Мигран Эдикович Арутюнян; born 25 March 1989) is an Armenian-Russian Greco-Roman wrestler and mixed martial artist. He competed at the 2016 Summer Olympics for Armenia where in the final he lost to Davor Štefanek of Serbia. The decision is still considered to be very doubtful, and a lot of people signed petition to award gold medal to Harutyunyan. He is also a Russian national champion (2012) and runner-up (2011).

== Mixed martial arts record ==
Professional record breakdown
| 5 matches | 4 wins | 1 loss |
| By knockout | 2 | 1 |
| By submission | 2 | 0 |

| Res. | Record | Opponent | Method | Event | Date | Round | Time | Location | Notes |
|---|---|---|---|---|---|---|---|---|---|
| Win | 4–1 | Akhmedkhan Akhmedov | TKO (punches) | EFC 35: Dakaev vs Abdurakov | April 6, 2021 | 1 | 3:17 | Moscow, Russia | |
| Loss | 3–1 | Zhasulan Akimzhanov | KO (spinning back kick) | GFC 19: Krepost Selection 6 | October 20, 2019 | 3 | 4:48 | Sochi, Russia | |
| Win | 3–0 | Muratkhan Saytkhanov | Submission (guillotine choke) | Krepost Fight Club: Selection 5 | September 7, 2019 | 1 | 1:17 | Moscow, Russia | |
| Win | 2–0 | Evgeny Perepechin | TKO (punches) | Battle on Volga 8 | December 14, 2018 | 1 | 4:50 | Samara, Russia | |
| Win | 1–0 | Ali Yousefi | Submission (shoulder choke) | Fight Nights Global 87: Khachatryan vs. Queally | May 19, 2018 | 2 | 0:47 | Rostov-on-Don, Russia | Featherweight debut. |

== Personal life ==
He is married and has a daughter named Monica. In 2020, following the outbreak of the Nagorno-Karabakh war, he volunteered to join the defense of Artsakh.
