= Yury Dubinin (wrestler) =

Belarusian freestyle wrestler

Yury Dubinin (born 10 September 1976 in Beloretsk) is a male freestyle wrestler from Belarus. He participated in men's freestyle 60 kg at the 2008 Summer Olympics. Dubinin lost to South Korea's Jung Ji-Hyun and did not advance past the first round.
