= Vitaliy Rahimov =

Azerbaijani wrestler (born 1984)

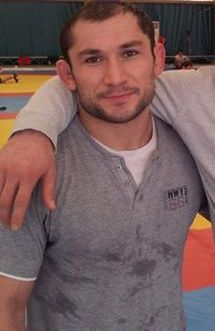

Medal record

Men's Greco-Roman wrestling

Representing Azerbaijan

World Championships
Bronze medal – third place	2009 Herning	60 kg
Bronze medal – third place	2010 Moscow	66 kg

European Championships
Gold medal – first place	2005 Varna	60 kg
Bronze medal – third place	2011 Dortmund	66 kg

Vitaliy Medzhidovich Rahimov (Russian: Вита́лий Меджи́дович Раги́мов born 27 August 1984, Meghri, Armenian SSR) is an Azerbaijani athlete.

Rahimov moved with his family to Azerbaijan in 1990. He has been trained in Greco-Roman wrestling since 1994. He made the Azerbaijani Olympic teams in 2004 and 2008. In the 2004 Olympics in Athens, Rahimov beat Jim Gruenwald of the United States (7–0) but was later defeated by the Serbian Davor Stefanek.

In the 2008 Beijing Olympics, Rahimov reached the final having beaten Sheng Jiang (China), Eusebiu Diaconu (Romania), Armen Nazaryan (Bulgaria), and Nurbakyt Tengizbayev (Turkmenistan) but lost to Islambek Albiev from Russia. On 17 November 2016 the IOC disqualified him from the 2008 Olympic Games, stripped his Olympic silver medal and struck his results from the record for failing a drugs test in a re-analysis of his doping sample from 2008.
