= Jarkko Ala-Huikku =

Finnish wrestler (born 1980)

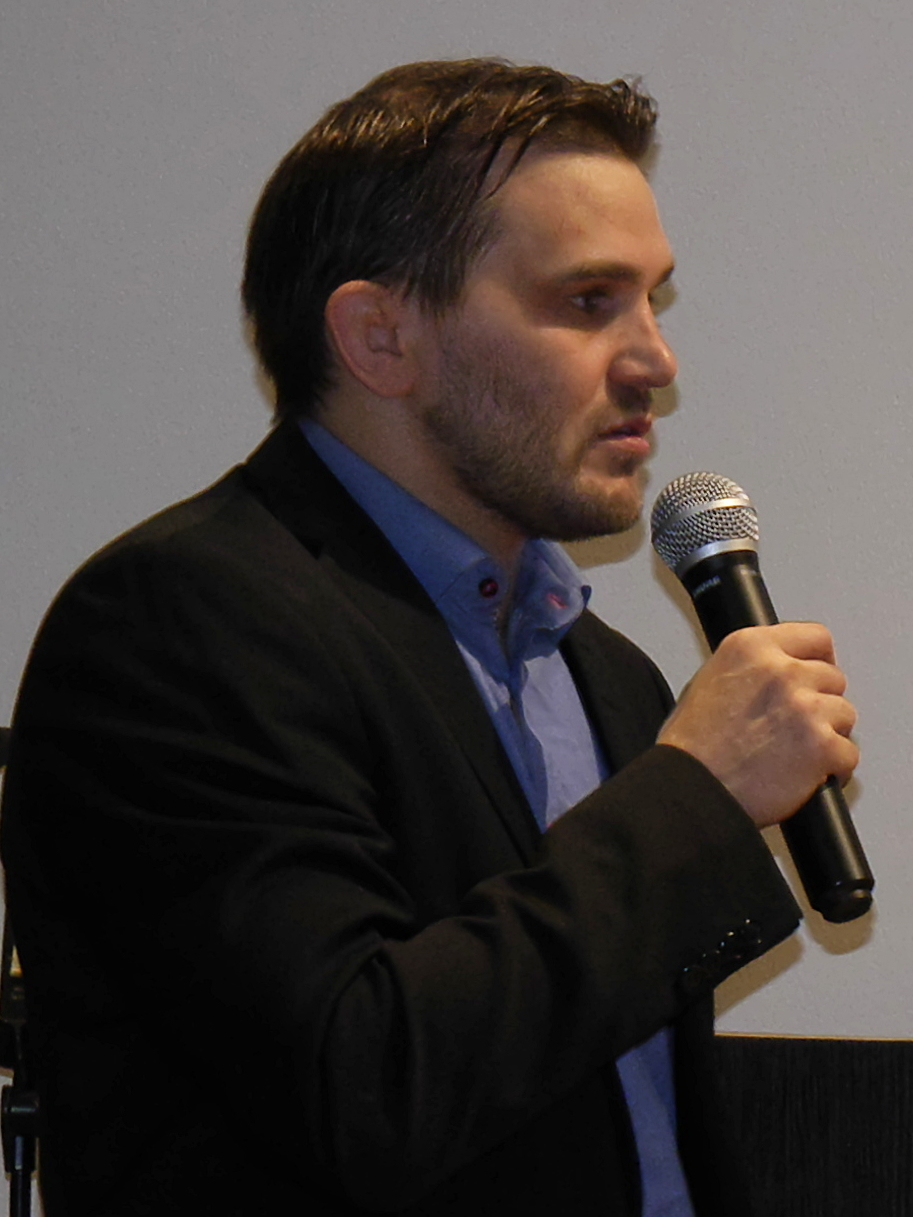
- Jarkko Ala-Huikku

Personal information
- Nationality: Finland
- Born: 31 January 1980 (age 46) Seinäjoki, Finland
- Height: 1.64 m (5 ft 4 1/2 in)
- Weight: 60 kg (132 lb)

Sport
- Sport: Wrestling
- Event: Greco-Roman
- Club: Ilmajoen Kisailijat
- Coached by: Seppo Yli-Hannuksela
Medal record
Men's Greco-Roman wrestling
Representing Finland
European Championships
Gold medal – first place	2008 Tampere	60 kg
Bronze medal – third place	2007 Sofia	60 kg

Tapani Jarkko Ala-Huikku (born January 31, 1980, in Seinäjoki) is an amateur Finnish Greco-Roman wrestler, who played for the men's lightweight category. He won the bronze medal for his division at the 2007 European Wrestling Championships in Sofia, Bulgaria, and gold at the 2008 European Wrestling Championships in Tampere. He is also a member of Ilmajoen Kisailijat Wrestling Club in Ilmajoki, and is coached and trained by Seppo Yli-Hannuksela, the father of two-time Olympic medalist Marko Yli-Hannuksela.

At age twenty-eight, Ala-Huikku made his official debut at the 2008 Summer Olympics in Beijing, where he competed in the men's 60 kg class. He received a bye for the second preliminary match, before losing out to Kyrgyzstan's Ruslan Tumenbaev, who was able to score seven points in two straight periods, leaving Ala-Huikku with a single point.

At the 2012 Summer Olympics in London, Ala-Huikku, however, lost again in the second preliminary match of men's 60 kg class to France's Tarik Belmadani, with a technical score of 0–4.

Nowadays Ala-Huikku is working as sport journalist and commentator in Finnish Broadcasting Company YLE.
