= Ailinuer =

Chinese freestyle wrestler (born 1979)

Ailinu'er (simplified Chinese: 艾力努尔; traditional Chinese: 艾力努爾; pinyin: Àilìnǔ'ěr; born July 16, 1979) is a male Chinese freestyle wrestler who competed at the 2004 Summer Olympics.

He finished 13th in the 60 kg Greco-Roman competition.
