= Tero Välimäki =

Finnish Greco-Roman wrestler

Tero Välimäki (born 21 March 1982) is a Finnish Greco-Roman wrestler. He competed in the men's Greco-Roman 66 kg event at the 2016 Summer Olympics, in which he was eliminated in the round of 16 by Shmagi Bolkvadze.
