= Ashraf El-Gharably =

Egyptian Greco-Roman wrestler

Personal information
- Full name: Ashraf Mohamed El-Meligy; El-Gharably
- Nationality: Egyptian
- Born: 14 January 1979 (age 47) Al-Minufiyah, Egypt
- Height: 1.65 m (5 ft 5 in)
- Weight: 60 kg (132 lb)

Sport
- Sport: Wrestling
- Event: Greco-Roman
- Club: Cairo Police Sports Club
- Coached by: Muhammed Abu Shahim
Medal record
Men's Greco-Roman wrestling
Representing Egypt
Mediterranean Games
Gold medal – first place	2005 Almería	60 kg
Bronze medal – third place	2001 Tunis	60 kg

Ashraf Mohamed El-Meligy El-Gharably (Arabic: أشرف محمد المليجي الغرابلى; born 14 January 1979) is an amateur Egyptian Greco-Roman wrestler, who played for the men's lightweight category. He is a two-time All-Africa Games gold medalist, a three-time Olympian, and a multiple-time African wrestling champion. He also captured a bronze medal at the 2001 Mediterranean Games in Tunis, Tunisia, and eventually defeated Serbia and Montenegro's Davor Štefanek for the gold at the 2005 Mediterranean Games in Almería, Spain.

El-Gharably made his official debut for the 2004 Summer Olympics in Athens, where he placed second in the preliminary pool of the men's 60 kg class, against Bulgaria's Armen Nazaryan and Ukraine's Oleksandr Khvoshch.

At the 2008 Summer Olympics in Beijing, El-Gharably competed for the second time in the men's 60 kg class. He lost the qualifying round match by a superiority decision to Romania's Eusebiu Diaconu, after the pair had tied 3–3.

At the 2012 Summer Olympics in London, El-Gharably switched to a heavier category by competing in the men's welterweight class (66 kg). He defeated Ecuador's Orlando Huacón in the preliminary round of sixteen, before losing out the quarterfinal match to Georgian wrestler Manuchar Tskhadaia, who was able to score six points in two straight periods, leaving El-Gharably without a single point.
