= Nurbakyt Tengizbayev =

Kazakhstani wrestler (born 1983)

Personal information
- Born: 10 April 1983 (age 43) Usharal, Kazakh SSR, Soviet Union
- Height: 168 cm (5 ft 6 in)
- Weight: 60 kg (132 lb)
Medal record
Men's Greco-Roman wrestling
Representing Kazakhstan
Olympic Games
| Silver medal – second place | 2008 Beijing | 60 kg |
World Championships
| Bronze medal – third place | 2009 Herning | 60 kg |

Nurbakyt Moldakhmetuly Tengizbayev (Kazakh: Нұрбақыт Молдахметұлы Теңізбаев, romanized: Nūrbaqyt Moldahmetūly Teñızbaev; born 10 April 1983) is a Kazakh former wrestler and politician who won the silver medal in the Men's Greco-Roman 60 kg in the 2008 Summer Olympics in Beijing. Tengizbayev now serves as Member of the Kurultai of the first convocation from the Ädilet party list since 28 August 2026.

Originally, Nurbakyt Tengizbayev was awarded the bronze medal. However, on 17 November 2016, the IOC disqualified Vitaliy Rahimov from the 2008 Olympic Games, stripped his Olympic silver medal, and struck his results from the record for failing a drugs test in a re-analysis of his doping sample from 2008. As a result, Nurbakyt Tengizbayev was awarded the silver medal.

After the 2026 Kazakh legislative election, Tengizbayev was elected to the 1st Kurultai of Kazakhstan from the Ädilet party list.
