= Sidney Guzman =

Peruvian Greco-Roman wrestler

Personal information
- Full name: Sidney Guzman Villacosta
- Nationality: Peru
- Born: 12 October 1977 (age 48) Lobitos, Talara, Peru
- Height: 1.65 m (5 ft 5 in)
- Weight: 60 kg (132 lb)

Sport
- Style: Greco-Roman
- Club: Club Lucha Orlando Ochoa
- Coach: Luis Jery Caceres
Medal record
Men's Greco-Roman wrestling
Representing Peru
Pan American Games
Bronze medal – third place	1999 Winnipeg	58 kg

Sidney Guzman Villacosta (born October 12, 1977 in Lobitos, Talara) is a retired Peruvian Greco-Roman wrestler, who competed in the men's lightweight category. He earned a bronze medal in the 58-kg division at the 1999 Pan American Games in Winnipeg, Manitoba, Canada, and later represented his nation Peru at the 2004 Summer Olympics, finishing fifteenth in the process. Guzman also trained throughout his sporting career for Orlando Ochoa Wrestling Club in Lima under his personal coach and mentor Luis Jery Caceres.

Guzman qualified as a lone wrestler for the Peruvian squad in the men's 60 kg class at the 2004 Summer Olympics in Athens. Earlier in the process, he placed second at the Pan American Championships in Guatemala City, Guatemala, but managed to fill up an entry by the International Federation of Association Wrestling through a tripartite invitation. He lost his opening match to Japan's Makoto Sasamoto on technical superiority, but bounced back to eclipse Serbia and Montenegro's Davor Štefanek in overtime with a 3–1 decision during the prelim pool round. Placing second in the pool and fifteenth in the final standings, Guzman failed to advance to the quarterfinals.
