= Ali Ashkani =

Iranian Greco-Roman wrestler

Personal information
- Full name: Ali Ashkani Aghbolagh
- Nationality: Iran
- Born: 16 November 1978 (age 47) Ardabil, Iran
- Height: 1.66 m (5 ft 5 1/2 in)
- Weight: 60 kg (132 lb)

Sport
- Style: Greco-Roman
- Club: Takhti Wrestling Club
- Coach: Djafar Damirchi
Medal record
Men's Greco-Roman wrestling
Representing Iran
World Championships
Silver medal – second place	2005 Budapest	60 kg
Universiade
Gold medal – first place	2005 İzmir	60 kg
Asian Championships
Gold medal – first place	2000 Seoul	58 kg
Gold medal – first place	2001 Ulaanbaatar	58 kg
Gold medal – first place	2005 Wuhan	60 kg
Silver medal – second place	2003 New Delhi	60 kg

Ali Ashkani Aghbolagh (Persian: علی اشکانی آق بلاغ; born 16 November 1978) is an Iranian retired amateur Greco-Roman wrestler who competed in the men's lightweight category. As of 2020, he is the coach of Iranian Greco-Roman wrestling, . He won four Asian Championship medals (three golds and one silver), picked up a silver in the 60-kg division at the 2005 World Wrestling Championships in Budapest, Hungary, and represented Iran in two editions of the Olympic Games (2000 and 2004), finishing fifth in Sydney and eleventh in Athens respectively. Throughout his sporting career, Ashkani trained full-time for Takhti Wrestling Club in Ardabil under his coach and mentor Jafar Damirchi.

Ashkani reached sporting headlines at the 2000 Asian Wrestling Championships in Seoul, South Korea, where he won his first title in the 58-kg division over Uzbekistan's Dilshod Aripov. A few months later, Ashkani entered the 2000 Summer Olympics in Sydney as a dark horse in the men's featherweight category (58 kg). He dominated the field by thrashing Hungary's István Majoros (1–5) and Georgia's Koba Guliashvili in the prelim pool to secure his place in the next round of the tournament. Ashkani lost the quarterfinal match to eventual silver medalist Kim In-Sub of South Korea with a powerful 3–1 decision, but bounced back to turn down U.S. wrestler Jim Gruenwald on the mat 3–2 for a fifth-place finish.

After his first Olympics, Ashkani proved particularly successful in his career with two more medals in both 58 and 60-kg division at the Asian Championships (2001 and 2003). Determined to return to the wrestling scene and medal, Ashkani emerged himself as a top medal favorite at the 2002 Asian Games in South Korea, but lost to Kazakhstan's Nurlan Koizhaiganov in the quarterfinal match 4–1.

At the 2004 Summer Olympics in Athens, Ashkani qualified for his second Iranian squad, as a 25-year-old, in the men's 60 kg class. Earlier in the process, he finished third at the Olympic Qualification Tournament in Tashkent, Uzbekistan to guarantee his spot on the Iranian wrestling team. Ashkani lost two opening matches each to Cuba's Roberto Monzón (1–4) and Turkey's Şeref Tüfenk (1–3), but stunned the home crowd to tame Greek wrestler Christos Gikas with a 1–6 verdict at the end of the prelim pool. Unlike his previous Games, Ashkani's performance was not enough to advance him to the quarterfinals, placing eleventh in the final standings.

In 2005, Ashkani recovered from an Olympic setback to flourish his wrestling career with two more medals. He reaped the men's 60-kg title over South Korea's Kim Keum-Hae at the Summer Universiade in İzmir, Turkey, and then picked up a silver medal from the World Championships in Budapest, Hungary, losing out to defending titleholder Armen Nazaryan of Bulgaria due to a three-caution violation by the referee.
