= Christos Gikas =

Greek wrestler (born 1976)

Personal information
- Full name: Christos Gikas
- Nationality: Greece
- Born: 12 August 1976 (age 49) Gjirokastër, Albania
- Height: 1.66 m (5 ft 5 1/2 in)
- Weight: 60 kg (132 lb)

Sport
- Style: Greco-Roman
- Club: Olympiacos
- Coach: Aristidis Rubenyan
Medal record
Men's Greco-Roman wrestling
Representing Greece
Mediterranean Games
Silver medal – second place	2001 Tunis	63 kg

Christos Gikas (Greek: Χρήστος Γκίκας; born August 12, 1976, in Gjirokastër, Albania) is a retired amateur Greek Greco-Roman wrestler, who competed in the men's lightweight category. He won a silver medal in the 63-kg division at the 2001 Mediterranean Games in Tunis, Tunisia, and had been selected to the nation's Olympic wrestling team when Greece hosted the 2004 Summer Olympics in Athens. Gikas also trained as a member of the wrestling squad for Olympiacos in Athens, under his personal coach Aristidis Rubenyan. As a player of Olympiacos, he won the European CELA Cup in 2006.

Gikas qualified for his naturalized Greek squad in the men's 60 kg class at the 2004 Summer Olympics in Athens. He filled up an entry by the International Federation of Association Wrestling and the Hellenic Olympic Committee, as Greece received an automatic berth for being the host nation. In front of the home crowd inside Ano Liossia Olympic Hall, Gikas lost three straight matches each to Turkey's Şeref Tüfenk (0–5), eventual Olympic silver medalist Roberto Monzón of Cuba (0–7), and two-time Olympian Ali Ashkani of Iran (1–6), leaving him on the bottom of the prelim pool and placing twentieth in the final standings.
