= Paolo Fucile =

Italian Greco-Roman wrestler

Personal information
- Full name: Paolo Fucile
- Nationality: Italy
- Born: 29 June 1981 (age 45) Catania, Italy
- Height: 1.65 m (5 ft 5 in)
- Weight: 60 kg (132 lb)

Sport
- Style: Greco-Roman
- Club: Fiamme Oro
- Coach: Mauro Massaro
Medal record
Men's Greco-Roman wrestling
Representing Italy
Mediterranean Games
Bronze medal – third place	2009 Pescara	60 kg

Paolo Fucile (born June 29, 1981, in Catania) is a retired amateur Italian Greco-Roman wrestler, who competed in the men's lightweight category. He represented his nation Italy at the 2004 Summer Olympics, and later scored a bronze medal in the 60-kg division at the 2009 Mediterranean Games in Pescara. Having worked as a police officer for Polizia di Stato, Fucile trained full-time for the wrestling squad at Gruppo Sportivo Fiamme Oro in Rome, under head coach Mauro Massaro.

== Biography ==
Fucile qualified for the Italian squad in the men's 60 kg class at the 2004 Summer Olympics in Athens. Earlier in the process, he finished third from the Olympic Qualification Tournament in Novi Sad, Serbia and Montenegro to guarantee his spot on the Italian wrestling team. Fucile lost his opening match to 2000 Olympic bronze medalist Akaki Chachua of Georgia on technical superiority, and could not score enough points to tame Kazakhstan's Nurlan Koizhaiganov by a 7–0 deficit, leaving him on the bottom of the prelim pool and placing last out of 22 wrestlers in the final standings.

When Italy hosted the 2009 Mediterranean Games in Pescara, Fucile overpowered his opponents to pick up a bronze medal in the 60-kg division, to the delight of the home crowd.
