= David Bedinadze =

Georgian Greco-Roman wrestler

Personal information
- Nationality: Georgia
- Born: 5 February 1985 (age 41) Batumi, Georgian SSR, Soviet Union
- Height: 1.68 m (5 ft 6 in)
- Weight: 60 kg (132 lb)

Sport
- Sport: Wrestling
- Event: Greco-Roman
- Club: Dynamo Tbilisi
- Coached by: Vaza Gravishvili
Medal record
Men's Greco-Roman wrestling
Representing Georgia
World Championships
Gold medal – first place	2007 Baku	60 kg
Silver medal – second place	2006 Guangzhou	60 kg
European Championships
Bronze medal – third place	2005 Varna	60 kg
Silver medal – second place	2006 Moscow	60 kg

David Bedinadze (Georgian: დავით ბედინაძე; born February 5, 1985, in Batumi) is an amateur Georgian Greco-Roman wrestler, who played for the men's lightweight category. He won a silver medal at the 2006 World Wrestling Championships in Guangzhou, China, and eventually defeated Japan's Makoto Sasamoto for the gold in his division at the 2007 World Wrestling Championships in Baku, Azerbaijan. He also added a bronze medal to his collection from the 2005 European Wrestling Championships in Varna, Bulgaria. Bedinadze is a member of the wrestling team for Dynamo Tbilisi, and is coached and trained by Vaza Gravishvili.

Bedinadze represented Georgia at the 2008 Summer Olympics, where he competed for the men's 60 kg class. He lost the qualifying round match to Bulgarian wrestler and two-time Olympic champion Armen Nazaryan, with a three-set technical score (1–1, 4–1, 5–0), and a classification point score of 1–3.
