= Ruslan Tyumenbayev =

Kyrgyzstani wrestler (born 1986)

Medal record

Men's Greco-Roman wrestling

Representing Kyrgyzstan

Olympic Games
Bronze medal – third place	2008 Beijing	60 kg

Asian Championships
Gold medal – first place	2008 Jeju City	60 kg

1st World Qualification Tournament
Bronze medal – third place	2012 Taiyuan ( CHN)	66 kg

2nd World Qualification Tournament
Bronze medal – third place	2012 Helsinki (FIN)	66 kg

Ruslan Tyumenbayev (Kyrgyz: Руслан Түмөнбай уулу; Russian: Руслан Самаганович Тюменбаев; born May 28, 1986, in Frunze) is a Kyrgyz wrestler who won the bronze medal in the Men's Greco-Roman 60 kg in the 2008 Summer Olympics in Beijing.
