= Sheng Jiang =

Chinese Greco-Roman wrestler

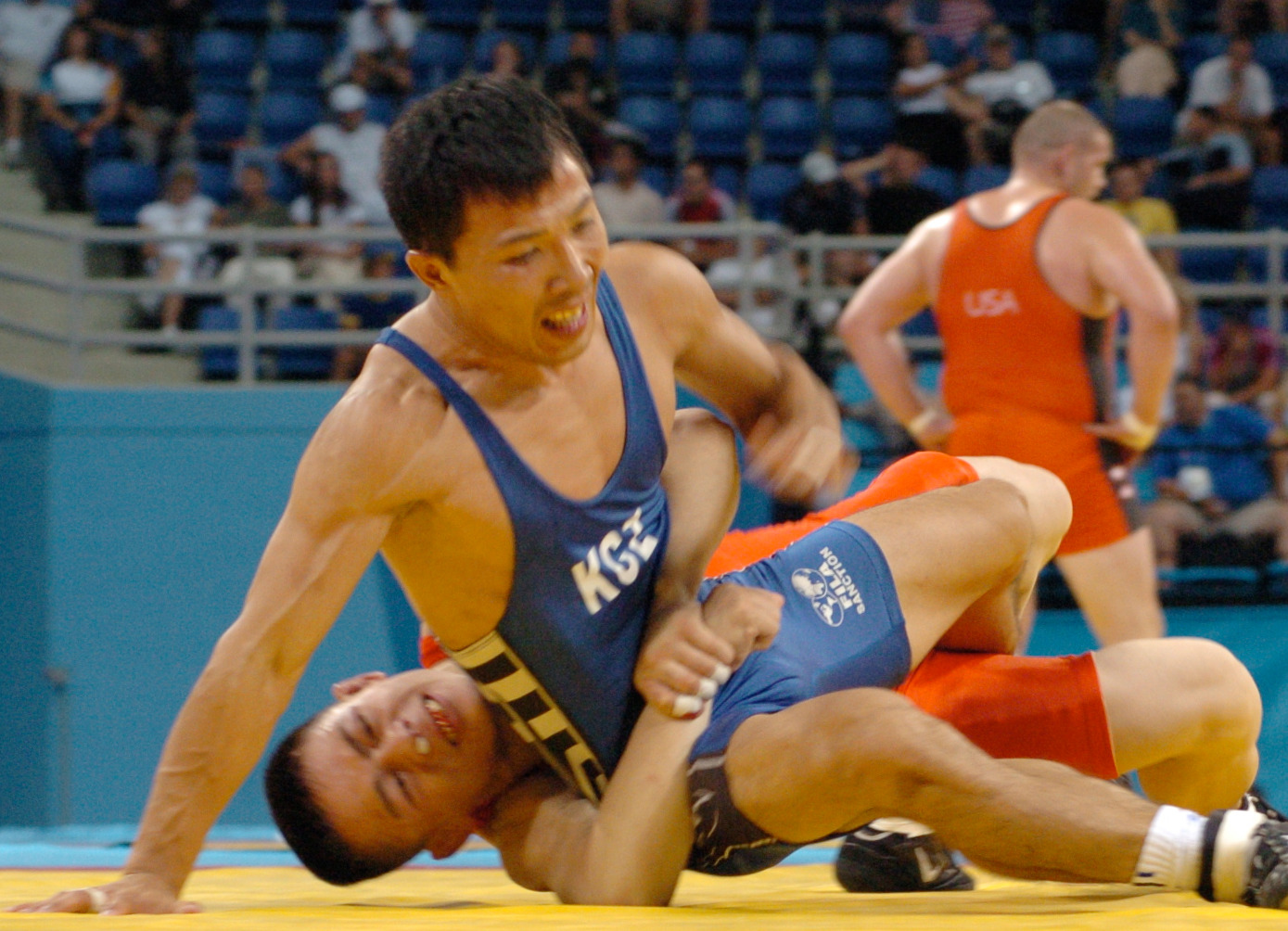
- Sheng Jiang (bottom) at the 2004 Olympics

Personal information
- Born: March 25, 1983 (age 43) Hangzhou, China
- Height: 1.62 m (5 ft 4 in)
- Weight: 60 kg (132 lb)

Sport
- Style: Greco-Roman
- Club: Zhenjiang
Medal record
Men's Greco-Roman wrestling
Representing China
Olympic Games
Bronze medal – third place	2008 Beijing	60 kg
Asian Games
Silver medal – second place	2006 Doha	60 kg
Asian Championships
Bronze medal – third place	2006 Almaty	60 kg

Sheng Jiang (Chinese: 盛江; pinyin: Shèng Jiāng; born March 25, 1983) is a retired Greco-Roman wrestler from China. In 2006 he won silver medals at the Asian Games and Asian Championships. He competed at the 2004, 2008 and 2012 Olympics with the best result of a bronze medal in 2008.
