= Jurij Kohl =

German Greco-Roman wrestler

Personal information
- Full name: Jurij Kohl
- Nationality: Germany
- Born: 17 May 1975 (age 51) Jambyl, Kazakh SSR, Soviet Union
- Height: 1.69 m (5 ft 6 1/2 in)
- Weight: 67 kg (148 lb)

Sport
- Style: Greco-Roman
- Club: KSV Köllerbach
- Coach: Frank Hartmann

Jurij Kohl (born May 17, 1975 in Jambyl, Kazakh SSR) is a retired amateur German Greco-Roman wrestler, who competed in the men's lightweight category. He achieved top five finishes in the 60-kg division at the European Championships, and also represented his nation Germany at the 2004 Summer Olympics. Before his competitive sporting career ended in 2012, Kohl trained full-time as a member of the wrestling club for KSV Köllerbach and ASV Mainz 88, under his personal coach Frank Hartmann. Born and raised in the former Soviet Union, Kohl also held a dual citizenship to compete for Germany in numerous wrestling tournaments, including the Olympic Games.

Kohl qualified for his naturalized German squad in the men's 60 kg class at the 2004 Summer Olympics in Athens by receiving a berth and rounding out the top ten spot from the 2003 World Wrestling Championships in Créteil, France. He lost two straight matches each to Russian wrestler and two-time Olympian Aleksey Shvetsov (0–7) and China's Ailinuer with a 2–3 sudden death decision, leaving him on the bottom of the pool and finishing nineteenth overall in the final standings.
