= Nurlan Koizhaiganov =

Kazakhstani wrestler

Personal information
- Full name: Nurlan Altynbekovich Koizhaiganov
- Nationality: Kazakhstan
- Born: 27 March 1977 (age 49) Ayagoz, Kazakh SSR, Soviet Union
- Height: 1.70 m (5 ft 7 in)
- Weight: 60 kg (132 lb)

Sport
- Style: Greco-Roman
- Club: Professional Sport Club; Daulet
- Coach: Kanat Nurlasiev

Nurlan Altynbekovich Koizhaiganov (Kazakh: Нұрлан Алтынбекұлы Қойжайғанов, Nūrlan Altynbekūly Qoijaiğanov; born March 27, 1977, in Ayagoz) is a retired amateur Kazakh Greco-Roman wrestler, who competed in the men's lightweight category. He scored top five finishes in the 60-kg division in two consecutive editions of the Asian Games (1998 and 2002), and later represented his nation Kazakhstan at the 2004 Summer Olympics. Before being retired from wrestling in 2005, Koizhaiganov also trained throughout his sporting career at Professional Sport Club Daulet in Semipalatinsk, under his personal coach Kanat Nurlasiev.

Koizhaiganov qualified for the Kazakh squad in the men's 60 kg class at the 2004 Summer Olympics in Athens. Earlier in the process, he placed first in his respective category from the Olympic Qualification Tournament in Tashkent, Uzbekistan to guarantee a spot on the Kazakh wrestling team. He easily ousted Italy's Paolo Fucile in his opening match by a quick 7–0 margin, and then overwhelmed 2000 Olympic bronze medalist Akaki Chachua of Georgia 7–6 in the prelim pool to clinch his spot for the next round of the competition. Koizhaiganov lost to neighboring Russia's Aleksey Shvetsov in the quarterfinal match at 1–3, and to Japan's Makoto Sasamoto in a consolation playoff with a comfortable 4–0 verdict, dropping him to sixth in the final standings.
