= Dilshod Aripov =

Uzbekistani Greco-Roman wrestler

Personal information
- Nationality: Uzbekistan
- Born: 20 May 1977 (age 49) Tashkent, Uzbek SSR
- Height: 1.70 m (5 ft 7 in)
- Weight: 60 kg (132 lb)

Sport
- Sport: Wrestling
- Event: Greco-Roman
- Club: Spartak Tashkent
- Coached by: Kamil Fatkulin
Medal record
Men's Greco-Roman wrestling
Representing Uzbekistan
Asian Games
Silver medal – second place	2002 Busan	60 kg
Bronze medal – third place	2006 Doha	60 kg
World Championships
Gold medal – first place	2001 Patras	58 kg
Silver medal – second place	2009 Herning	60 kg
Asian Championships
Gold medal – first place	1997 Tehran	54 kg
Silver medal – second place	2000 Seoul	58 kg
Silver medal – second place	2008 Jeju City	60 kg
Bronze medal – third place	1999 Tashkent	58 kg
Bronze medal – third place	2004 Almaty	60 kg

Dilshod Aripov (Uzbek: Дильшод Арипов; born May 20, 1977, in Tashkent) is an amateur Uzbekistani Greco-Roman wrestler, who played for the men's lightweight category. He is a two-time medalist at the Asian Games, and five-time at the Asian Wrestling Championships. Aripov also achieved his early international success by defeating Armenia's Karen Mnatsakanyan for a gold medal in the 58 kg class at the 2001 World Wrestling Championships in Patras, Greece.

Aripov made his official debut for the 2000 Summer Olympics in Sydney, where he competed in the men's featherweight division (58 kg). He placed second in the preliminary pool round against Kazakhstan's Yuriy Melnichenko and two-time Asian wrestling champion Kim In-Sub of South Korea, with a total score of two technical points, finishing in eleventh overall position.

Eight years later, Aripov qualified for the men's 60 kg class at the 2008 Summer Olympics in Beijing after placing second from the Asian Wrestling Championships in Jeju City, South Korea. He first defeated Serbia's Davor Štefanek in the qualifying round, before losing out his next match to Kyrgyzstan's Ruslan Tumenbaev, who eventually won the bronze medal in this event.

At the 2009 World Wrestling Championships in Herning, Denmark, Aripov recaptured his success from an eight-year drought by claiming a silver medal in the final match against defending Olympic champion Islambek Albiev of Russia, with a technical score of 0–4.
