= Makoto Sasamoto =

Japanese Greco-Roman wrestler

Personal information
- Full name: Makoto Sasamoto
- Nationality: Japan
- Born: 21 January 1977 (age 49) Sagamihara, Kanagawa, Japan
- Height: 1.63 m (5 ft 4 in)
- Weight: 60 kg (132 lb)

Sport
- Style: Greco-Roman
- Club: Sogokeibi Sports Club
- Coach: Hideo Fujimoto
Medal record
Men's Greco-Roman wrestling
Representing Japan
Asian Games
| Gold medal – first place | 2006 Doha | 60 kg |
| Bronze medal – third place | 2002 Busan | 60 kg |
World Championships
| Silver medal – second place | 2007 Baku | 60 kg |
Asian Championships
| Bronze medal – third place | 2005 Wuhan | 60 kg |

Makoto Sasamoto (笹本 睦, Sasamoto Makoto; born January 21, 1977, in Sagamihara, Kanagawa) is an amateur Japanese Greco-Roman wrestler, who competed in the men's lightweight category. He is a three-time Olympian, a two-time Asian Games medalist (2002 in Busan, South Korea and 2006 in Doha, Qatar), and a bronze medalist at the 2005 Asian Wrestling Championships in Wuhan, China. He also won a silver medal for his division at the 2007 World Wrestling Championships in Baku, Azerbaijan, losing out to Georgia's David Bedinadze. Sasamoto is a member of the wrestling team for Sogokeibi Sports Club in Tokyo, and is coached and trained by Hideo Fujimoto.

Sasamoto made his official debut for the 2000 Summer Olympics in Sydney, where he placed second in the four-man prelim pool of the men's 58 kg class, against Bulgarian wrestler and two-time Olympic champion Armen Nazaryan, Turkmenistan's Nepes Gukulov, and Australia's Brett Cash.

At the 2004 Summer Olympics in Athens, Sasamoto switched to a heavier class by competing in the 60 kg class. He reached the knock-out stage of the competition, by winning the preliminary pool round against Peru's Sidney Guzman, and Serbia and Montenegro's Davor Štefanek. He lost a controversial ruling to Nazaryan in the quarterfinal match, with a score of 3–5, but bounced back to clinch the fifth spot in a consolation playoff against Kazakhstan's Nurlan Koizhaiganov with a comfortable 4–0 decision.

At the 2008 Summer Olympics in Beijing, Sasamoto defeated Armenia's Karen Mnatsakanyan in the qualifying rounds of the men's 60 kg class, before losing out his next match for the third consecutive time to Nazaryan, with a three-set technical score (4–0, 0–2, 0–2), and a classification point score of 1–3.
