= Ravinder Singh (wrestler) =

Indian wrestler (born 1982)

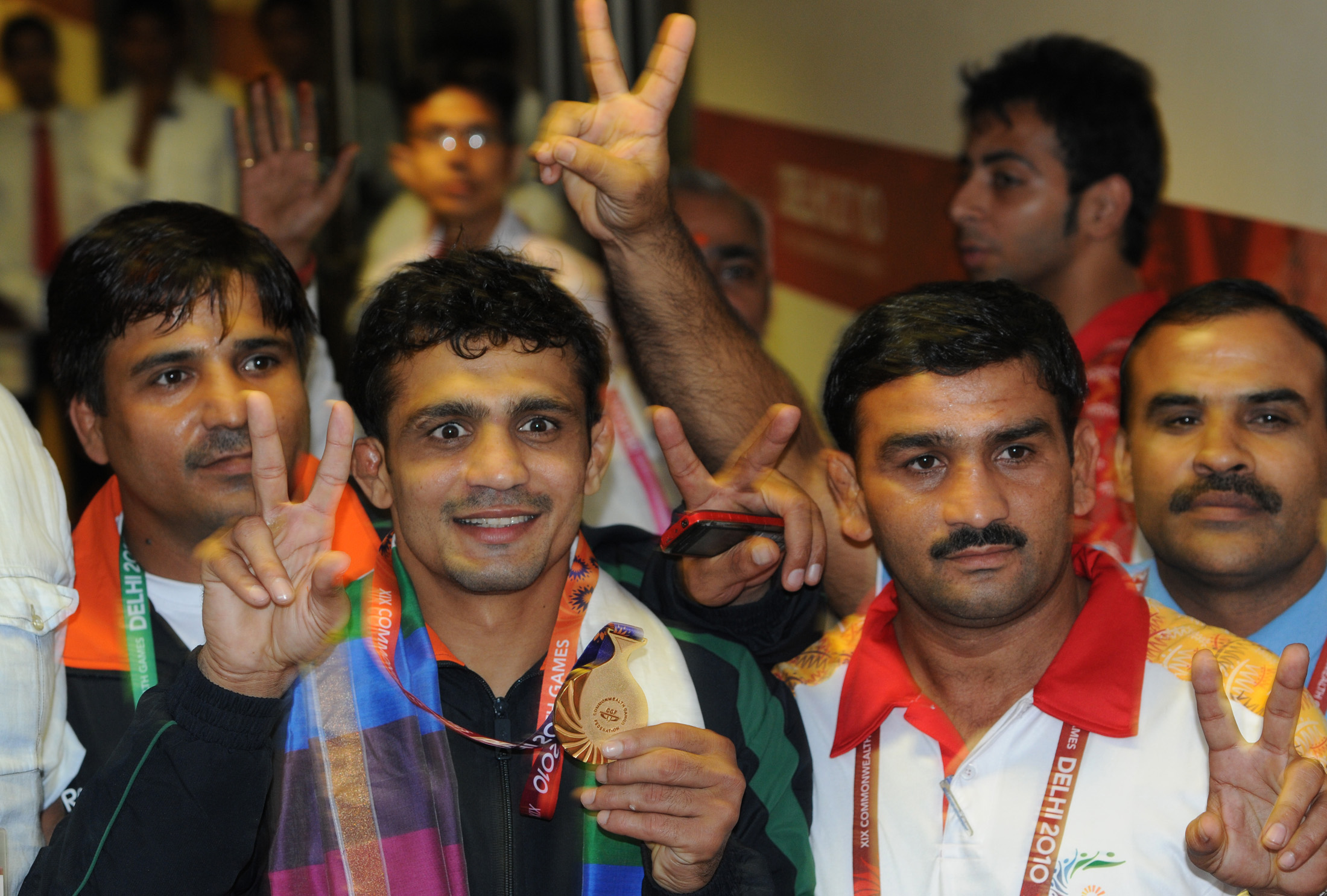
- XIX Commonwealth Games-2010 Delhi (Men’s) Wrestling Greco Roman 60 Kg, Ravinder Singh of India, won the gold medal, at Indira Gandhi Stadium, in New Delhi on October 05, 2010

Personal information
- Nationality: Indian
- Born: 30 September 1982 (age 43) Kharman, Jhajjar district, Haryana, India)
- Height: 165 cm (5 ft 5 in)
- Weight: 59 kg (130 lb)

Sport
- Sport: Greco-Roman wrestling
Medal record
Commonwealth Games
Gold medal – first place	2010	60 kg
Asian Games
Bronze medal – third place	2010	60 kg
Commonwealth Wrestling Championship
Gold medal – first place	2005	60 kg
Gold medal – first place	2007	60 kg
Gold medal – first place	2009	60 kg
Gold medal – first place	2011	60 kg

Ravinder Singh Sangwan (born 3 September 1982) is an Indian Greco-Roman wrestler. Singh has won 15 national championships and gold medals in the 2005, 2007, 2009 and 2011 Commonwealth Wrestling Championships. At the 2010 Commonwealth Games, he won a gold in the Men's Greco-Roman 60 kg wrestling category. At the 2010 Asian Games he won a bronze medal in the same category. Singh also competed in the 2013 World Wrestling Championships in Budapest, Hungary where he reached the quarter-finals.

Ravinder Singh is employed as a deputy superintendent within the Haryana police force. He received an Arjuna Award in 2011.
