= Jung Ji-hyun =

South Korean wrestler (born 1983)

- Hangul: 정지현
- Hanja: 鄭智鉉
- RR: Jeong Jihyeon
- MR: Chŏng Chihyŏn

Jung Ji-hyun
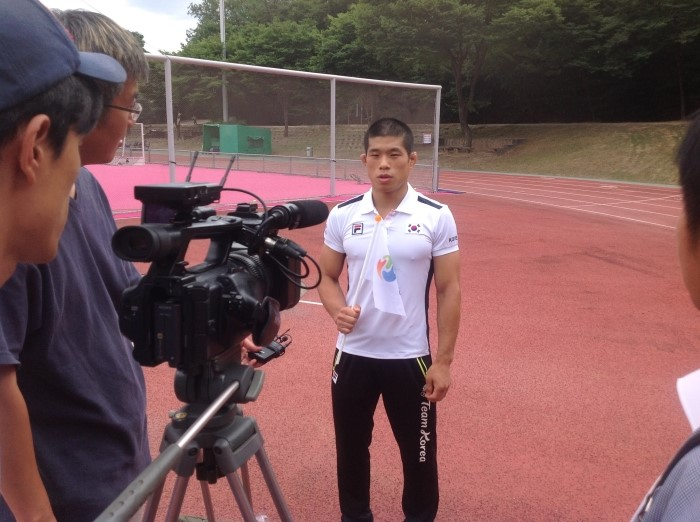

Medal record

Men's Greco-Roman wrestling

Representing South Korea

Olympic Games
Gold medal – first place	2004 Athens	60 kg

World Championships
Bronze medal – third place	2007 Baku	60 kg
Bronze medal – third place	2010 Moscow	60 kg

Asian Championships
Gold medal – first place	2004 Almaty	60 kg
Gold medal – first place	2006 Almaty	66 kg
Silver medal – second place	2007 Bishkek	66 kg

Jung Ji-hyun (Korean: 정지현; born March 26, 1983) is a South Korean former wrestler who won a gold medal at the 2004 Summer Olympics in Greco-Roman wrestling. Jung was born in Seoul, South Korea.

== Filmography ==
=== Web shows ===
Year	Title	Role	Notes	Ref.
2024	Physical: 100	Contestant	Season 2	
