= Eusebiu Diaconu =

Romanian Greco-Roman wrestler

Personal information
- Full name: Eusebiu Iancu Diaconu
- Nationality: Romania
- Born: 16 March 1981 (age 45) Bacău, Romania
- Height: 1.68 m (5 ft 6 in)
- Weight: 60 kg (132 lb)

Sport
- Sport: Wrestling
- Event: Greco-Roman
- Club: CCS Bacau
- Coached by: Gheorghe Mocanu
Medal record
Men's Greco-Roman wrestling
Representing Romania
World Championships
Bronze medal – third place	2003 Créteil	60 kg
Bronze medal – third place	2005 Budapest	60 kg
Bronze medal – third place	2007 Baku	60 kg
European Championships
Gold medal – first place	2007 Sofia	60 kg
Silver medal – second place	2005 Varna	60 kg
Bronze medal – third place	2009 Vilnius	60 kg

Eusebiu Iancu Diaconu (born March 16, 1981, in Bacău) is an amateur Romanian Greco-Roman wrestler, who played for the men's lightweight category. He is a two-time Olympian, a three-time medalist at the European Championships, and a three-time bronze medalist (2003, 2005, and 2007) for his division at the World Championships. He is also a member of CCS Bacau Wrestling, and is coached and trained by Gheorghe Mocanu.

Diaconu made his official debut for the 2004 Summer Olympics in Athens, where he reached the knock-out stage of the men's 60 kg, by winning the preliminary pool round against U.S. wrestler Jim Gruenwald and Portugal's Hugo Passos. He lost the quarterfinal match to South Korea's Jung Ji-Hyun, with a final score of 0–6.

At the 2008 Summer Olympics in Beijing, Diaconu competed for the second time in the men's 60 kg class. He first defeated Egypt's Ashraf El-Gharably by a superiority decision in the qualifying round, before losing out the preliminary round of sixteen to Azerbaijan's Vitaliy Rahimov, with a classification score of 1–3. Because his opponent advanced further into the final match, Diaconu offered another shot for the bronze medal by entering the repechage bouts. He was defeated by China's Sheng Jiang in the first round, with a score of 5–8.
