= Hugo Passos =

Portuguese Greco-Roman wrestler

Personal information
- Full name: Hugo Miguel da Silva Passos
- Nationality: Portugal
- Born: 27 September 1979 (age 46) Lisbon, Portugal
- Height: 1.65 m (5 ft 5 in)
- Weight: 60 kg (132 lb)

Sport
- Style: Greco-Roman
- Club: Casa Pia Atlético Clube
- Coach: David Maia

Hugo Miguel da Silva Passos, ComIH (born 27 September 1979 in Lisbon) is a former amateur Portuguese Greco-Roman wrestler, who competed in the men's lightweight category. He won four gold medals in his respective category at the Deaflympics (2001, 2005, 2009 and 2013), and set a historic milestone as the first legally deaf athlete to represent Portugal at the 2004 Summer Olympics. Despite having a hearing disability, Passos trained throughout his sporting career as a member of the wrestling team for Casa Pia Athletics Club (Portuguese: Casa Pia Atlético Clube) with the assistance of his personal coach and 1996 Olympic wrestler David Maia.

Passos qualified as a lone wrestler for the Portuguese squad in the men's 60 kg class at the 2004 Summer Olympics in Athens. Earlier in the process, he finished twenty-eighth in the Olympic Qualification Tournament in Novi Sad, Serbia and Montenegro but managed to fill up an entry by the International Federation of Association Wrestling through a tripartite invitation. Passos lost his opening match to Romania's Eusebiu Diaconu on technical superiority, and was wretchedly pinned by U.S. wrestler and two-time Olympian Jim Gruenwald with only nineteen seconds left in time, leaving him on the bottom of the prelim pool and placing penultimate out of 22 wrestlers in the final standings.
