= Karen Mnatsakanyan =

Armenian Greco-Roman wrestler

Personal information
- Born: 3 March 1977 (age 49) Yerevan, Armenian SSR, Soviet Union
- Height: 1.70 m (5 ft 7 in)
- Weight: 60 kg (130 lb)

Sport
- Sport: Wrestling
- Event: Greco-Roman
- Club: Dynamo Yerevan
- Coached by: Samvel Gevorgyan
Medal record
Men's Greco-Roman wrestling
Representing Armenia
World Championships
Silver medal – second place	2001 Patras	58 kg
European Championships
Gold medal – first place	1997 Kouvola	58 kg
Bronze medal – third place	1999 Sofia	58 kg
Gold medal – first place	2006 Moscow	60 kg

Karen Mnatsakanyan (Armenian: Կարեն Մնացականյան, born 3 March 1977) is a retired Armenian Greco-Roman wrestler. He is a World Championships silver medalist and two-time European Champion. Mnatsakanyan is only the second Wrestling European Champion in Greco-Roman wrestling from Armenia, after Armen Nazaryan. He also came in first place at the 1993 Cadet World Championships and 1997 Junior European Championships and competed at the 2000 Summer Olympics and 2008 Summer Olympics.
