= Roberto Monzón =

Cuban wrestler (born 1978)

Personal information
- Full name: Roberto Monzón González
- Born: 30 March 1978 (age 48) Havana, Cuba
Medal record
Men's Greco-Roman wrestling
Representing Cuba
Olympic Games
Silver medal – second place	2004 Athens	60 kg
Pan American Games
Gold medal – first place	2003 Santo Domingo	60 kg

Roberto Monzón González (born 30 March 1978) is a Cuban wrestler who competed in the 2004 Summer Olympics and in the 2008 Summer Olympics. He was born in Havana.
