= Davor Štefanek =

Serbian Greco-Roman wrestler

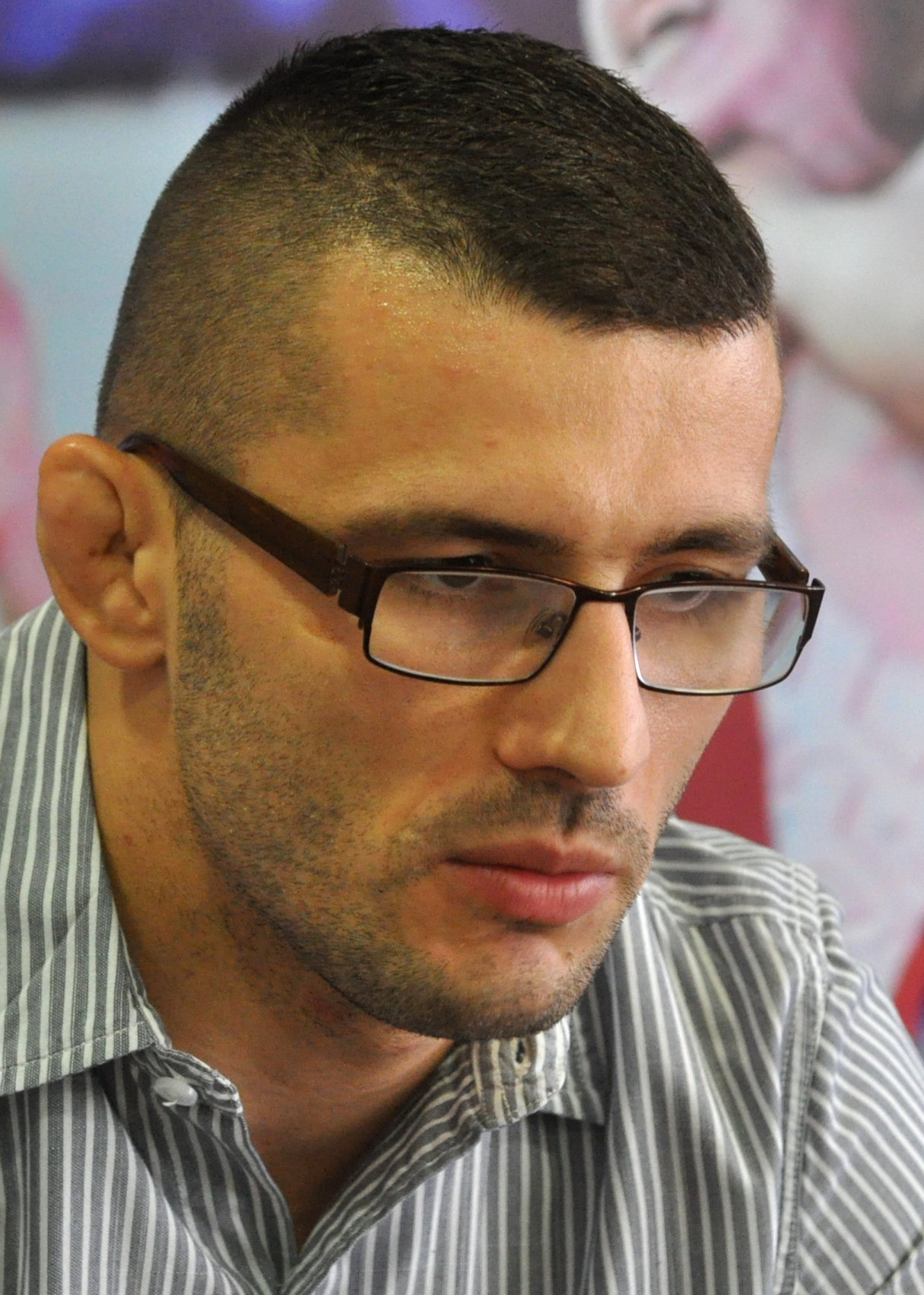
- Štefanek in 2015

Personal information
- Born: 12 September 1985 (age 40) Subotica, SR Serbia, SFR Yugoslavia
- Height: 1.70 m (5 ft 7 in)
- Weight: 66 kg (146 lb)

Sport
- Country: Serbia and Montenegro (2004–2006); Serbia (2006–)
- Sport: Wrestling
- Event: Greco-Roman
Medal record
Olympic Games
Gold medal – first place	2016 Rio de Janeiro	66 kg
World Championships
Gold medal – first place	2014 Tashkent	66 kg
Silver medal – second place	2018 Budapest	67 kg
Bronze medal – third place	2015 Las Vegas	66 kg
European Championships
Silver medal – second place	2004 Haparanda	60 kg
Silver medal – second place	2016 Riga	66 kg
Silver medal – second place	2017 Novi Sad	66 kg
Bronze medal – third place	2008 Tampere	60 kg
Bronze medal – third place	2012 Belgrade	60 kg
Mediterranean Games
Gold medal – first place	2009 Pescara	60 kg
Silver medal – second place	2005 Almeria	60 kg
Silver medal – second place	2018 Tarragona	77 kg

Davor Štefanek (Serbian Cyrillic: Давор Штефанек; born 12 September 1985) is a Serbian representative in Greco-Roman wrestling, he was the 2014 World champion and the 2016 Olympic champion in the Greco-Roman 66 kg category.

== Biography ==
At the Mediterranean Games, he has won two silver medals at the 2005 and 2018 renditions as well as a gold medal in 2009. At the European Wrestling Championships, he has won three silver and two bronze medals. At the World Wrestling Championships, he won a gold medal in 2014, silver medal in 2018, and bronze medal in 2015.

Štefanek represented Serbia and Montenegro at the 2004 Summer Olympics in Athens, as well as Serbia at the 2008 Summer Olympics in Beijing and 2016 Summer Olympics in Rio de Janeiro, where he won the gold medal in the 66kg event. Štefanek was the first Serbian athlete to win a medal in Rio de Janeiro after 11 days of disappointing results and was credited by other Serbian athletes for raising their spirits. The Serbian team then proceeded to win 7 more medals in the following days, making the 2016 Olympic Games edition by far the most successful in Serbia's history as an independent nation until that point.

He was awarded the golden Medal for Merits by the Republic of Serbia in 2019.

Awards and achievements
Preceded by Emir Bekrić	The Best Athlete of Serbia; 2014	Succeeded by Novak Djokovic
