= Armen Nazaryan =

Armenian Greco-Roman wrestler

Armen Lyudvigovich Nazaryan
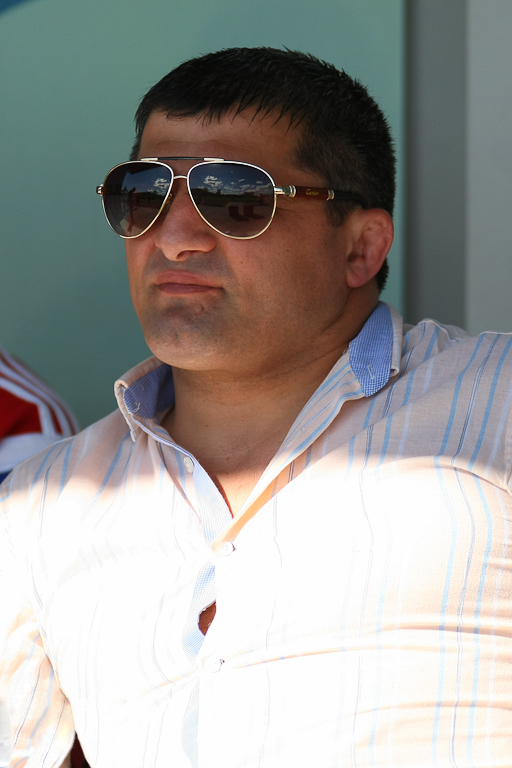

Personal information
- Nationality: Armenian
- Born: 9 March 1974 (age 52) Masis, Armenian SSR, Soviet Union
- Height: 1.62 m (5 ft 4 in)
- Weight: 60 kg (132 lb)

Sport
- Country: Armenia; Bulgaria
- Sport: Wrestling
- Event: Greco-Roman
- Club: Slavia Sofia
- Coached by: Robert Nersesyan; Bratan Tzenov
Medal record
Event	1st	2nd	3rd
Olympic Games	2	-	1
World Championships	3	2	3
European Championships	6	3	-
Total	11	5	4
Men's Greco-Roman wrestling
Representing Armenia
Olympic Games
Gold medal – first place	1996 Atlanta	52 kg
World Championships
Silver medal – second place	1993 Stockholm	52 kg
Silver medal – second place	1995 Prague	52 kg
European Championships
Gold medal – first place	1994 Athens	52 kg
Gold medal – first place	1995 Bezanson	52 kg
Silver medal – second place	1996 Budapest	52 kg
Representing Bulgaria
Olympic Games
Gold medal – first place	2000 Sydney	58 kg
Bronze medal – third place	2004 Athens	60 kg
World Championships
Gold medal – first place	2002 Moscow	60 kg
Gold medal – first place	2003 Créteil	60 kg
Gold medal – first place	2005 Budapest	60 kg
Bronze medal – third place	1997 Wrocław	58 kg
Bronze medal – third place	1998 Gävle	58 kg
Bronze medal – third place	1999 Athens	58 kg
European Championships
Gold medal – first place	1998 Minsk	58 kg
Gold medal – first place	1999 Sofia	58 kg
Gold medal – first place	2002 Seinayoky	60 kg
Gold medal – first place	2003 Belgrade	60 kg
Silver medal – second place	2000 Moscow	58 kg
Silver medal – second place	2008 Tampere	60 kg

Armen Lyudvigovich Nazaryan (Armenian: Արմեն Նազարյան, Bulgarian: Армен Назарян, born 9 March 1974) is an Armenian Greco-Roman wrestler who later represented Bulgaria. Nazaryan is a two-time Olympic Champion (1996, 2000), a three-time World Champion (2002, 2003, 2005), and a six-time European Champion (1994, 1995, 1998, 1999, 2002, 2003). After Armenia regained independence in 1991, Nazaryan became the first Olympic gold medalist for the country. He was recognized by the FILA as the best wrestler of the year in 1998 and 2003. In 2007, Nazaryan was inducted as a member of the FILA Hall of Fame.

== Early life ==
Nazaryan was born on 9 March 1974 in Masis, Armenia. He started wrestling at the age of eight under the coaching of Robert Nersesyan and entered the Yerevan Sports School in 1987.

== Career ==
In 1993, Nazaryan became an Espoir World Wrestling Champion and won a silver medal at the senior 1993 World Wrestling Championships. This marked the debut of Armenia in the World Wrestling Championships. Nazaryan had won the first ever medal for the independent Republic of Armenia at the World Wrestling Championships.

The following year, Nazaryan won a gold medal at the 1994 European Wrestling Championships, as both a senior and an espoir. Nazaryan became the first European Wrestling Champion from independent Armenia in the country's debut in the European Wrestling Championships. Turning 21 in the coming year, Nazaryan would soon become no longer eligible to compete in younger tournaments and competed only as a senior from then on.

Nazaryan repeated both the European Wrestling Championships gold medal and World Wrestling Championships silver medal in 1995, the former making him only the second European Wrestling Champion from Armenia. Because of his international success, Nazaryan was eligible to compete at the 1996 Summer Olympics.

=== 1996 Summer Olympics ===
Both Armen and his country made their debut at the 1996 Summer Olympics. Already a decorated sportsman, Nazaryan was one of the gold medal favorites of the competition in his weight class. He won a landslide victory in all five fights, defeating reigning World Wrestling Champion Samvel Danielyan, who defeated Nazaryan at the 1995 World Championships final, in the quarterfinals and home country favorite Brandon Paulson in the finals. Nazaryan became an Olympic gold medalist, the first ever Armenian athlete to become an Olympic medalist and Olympic Champion under the country's flag. He was voted the Armenian Athlete of the Year for 1996.

Over a year later, Nazaryan became a citizen of Bulgaria and began participating in international competitions for this country instead of his native Armenia. Many Armenians expressed great disappointment in their only Olympic Champion changing countries. Nazaryan would later state, “I love my country and I have always done the utmost for it. However, after I became an Olympic champion, our government didn’t appreciate me. I was offered to return to Armenia only in 2001, but my demands remained unsatisfied.”

Following the 1996 Olympics, Nazaryan moved up from the flyweight (52 kg) weight class to the heavier featherweight (58 kg) division. Nazaryan became a European Wrestling Champion in 1998 and 1999 in this new weight class. He had, however, been unable to win a World Wrestling Championship, coming in third place at every World Championship leading up to the 2000 Summer Olympics. Nazaryan had also lost his European Championship in 2000, just months before the Olympics that year.

=== 2000 Summer Olympics ===
After defeating three of his first four opponents via grand superiority, Nazaryan successfully advanced to the finals at the 2000 Olympics in Sydney, where he faced the larger, taller and reigning World Wrestling Champion, Kim In-Sub. In-Sub scored a stand-up takedown (0–3) in less than thirty seconds into the match. Nazaryan quickly got on top of In-Sub and both men were ordered to get up by the referee. A period of inactivity followed, with both wrestlers struggling to overcome the other in the clinch. The referee soon ordered for them to go on the mat, with Nazaryan in the top position. After much effort, Nazaryan successfully lifted In-Sub up overhead and scored a full takedown (5–3). Nazaryan then scored another takedown by lifting up In-Sub and turning him over (6–3) and then scored an exposure (9–3) by pinning In-Sub to the mat and finishing him via fall. Nazaryan had now become a two-time Olympic gold medalist.

=== 2004 Summer Olympics ===
After defending his Olympic Championship, Nazaryan moved up in weight again, this time to lightweight (60 kg). Nazaryan had a very successful 2002 and 2003, becoming a World Wrestling Champion and European Wrestling Champion in both years. It had seemed Nazaryan might become one of only a few people to become three-time Olympic Champions in wrestling, but this would not be the case. At the 2004 Summer Olympics, Nazaryan was defeated by eventual Olympic gold medalist Jung Ji-Hyun in the semifinals. Nazaryan did, however, defeat Aleksey Shevtsov in the bronze medal match to win the Olympic bronze medal, Nazaryan's third and final Olympic medal.

Despite the Olympic upset, Nazaryan won his third World Wrestling Championship gold medal in 2005. Nazaryan next competed at the 2006 World Wrestling Championships, where he was defeated in the first round in a poor performance. In 2007, Nazaryan was inducted as a member of the FILA Hall of Fame. Nazaryan made a comeback at the 2008 European Wrestling Championships, where he came in second place, thus qualifying for the 2008 Summer Olympics. Although he defeated reigning World Wrestling Champion David Berdinadze in the first round, Nazaryan competed without any medal success. Nazaryan has not competed since the 2008 Olympics.

After three years of inactivity, Nazaryan returned to sports to attempt to qualify for the 2012 Summer Olympics. However, after receiving an injury, Nazaryan was forced to abandon any hopes of returning to the Olympics.

== Post career ==
On 23 November 2012, Nazaryan became the head coach of the Bulgarian national Greco-Roman wrestling team. When asked if he wouldn't like to coach the Armenian national Greco-Roman wrestling team, Nazaryan praised the coaching of the Armenian national Greco-Roman wrestling head coach Levon Julfalakyan as doing everything to give good results. Nazaryan also expressed a desire for the Armenian and Bulgarian wrestling teams to practice together.

He was named the Coach of the year (for all sports) in Bulgaria for 2013.

== Personal life ==
Armen is married to Inga Nazaryan. He has two sons and one daughter. His son Edmond Nazaryan also competes in Greco-Roman wrestling and in 2020 he won the gold medal in the 55 kg event at the 2020 European Wrestling Championships held in Rome, Italy.
