= Wrestling at the 2004 Summer Olympics – Qualification =

This article details the Wrestling at the 2004 Summer Olympics qualifying phase.

Host nation Greece has reserved a spot in each of all 18 events, while twelve quotas were allocated to the countries which participated in all three qualification phases but failed to qualify any wrestler. It was based on the results obtained in the three competition phases, taking into consideration nations and continents with no qualified wrestlers. A further 4 invitational places were decided by the Tripartite Commission. Those quotas went to Afghanistan, Palau, Guinea-Bissau and Guam.

== Timeline ==
Event		Date	Venue
2003 World Championships	Freestyle	September 12–14, 2003	New York, United States
2003 World Championships	Women	September 12–14, 2003	New York, United States
2003 World Championships	Greco-Roman	October 2–5, 2003	Créteil, France
1st Qualification Tournaments	Freestyle	February 1–2, 2004	Bratislava, Slovakia
1st Qualification Tournaments	Greco-Roman	February 28–29, 2004	Novi Sad, Serbia and Montenegro
1st Qualification Tournaments	Women	March 6–7, 2004	Tunis, Tunisia
2nd Qualification Tournaments	Freestyle	February 14–15, 2004	Sofia, Bulgaria
2nd Qualification Tournaments	Greco-Roman	March 13–14, 2004	Tashkent, Uzbekistan
2nd Qualification Tournaments	Women	March 20–21, 2004	Madrid, Spain

== Qualification summary ==
NOC	Men's freestyle							Men's Greco-Roman							Women's freestyle				Total
NOC	55	60	66	74	84	96	120	55	60	66	74	84	96	120	48	55	63	72	Total
Afghanistan	X																		1
Albania		X																	1
Algeria								X											1
Armenia	X		X	X	X					X		X		X					7
Australia				X															1
Austria		X				X												X	3
Azerbaijan	X	X	X	X		X			X	X	X								8
Belarus	X			X	X	X	X				X	X	X	X			X		10
Brazil						X													1
Bulgaria	X	X	X	X	X	X	X		X	X		X	X	X				X	13
Canada		X	X	X											X	X	X	X	7
China	X					X		X	X		X				X	X	X	X	9
Colombia										X									1
Cuba	X	X	X	X	X		X	X	X	X	X		X	X					12
Czech Republic								X						X					2
Denmark								X											1
Dominican Republic								X											1
Egypt									X			X	X						3
Estonia												X							1
Finland											X			X					2
France					X							X		X	X	X	X		6
Georgia		X	X	X	X	X	X	X	X	X		X	X	X					12
Germany					X		X		X	X	X		X		X		X	X	9
Great Britain				X															1
Greece	X	X	X	X	X	X	X	X	X	X	X	X	X	X	X	X	X	X	18
Guam					X														1
Guinea-Bissau															X				1
Hungary		X	X	X			X	X		X	X		X	X					9
India	X	X	X	X	X		X	X											7
Iran	X	X	X	X	X	X	X	X	X	X		X	X	X					13
Israel											X	X		X					3
Italy				X			X		X			X				X		X	6
Japan	X	X	X	X	X			X	X		X	X			X	X	X	X	13
Kazakhstan	X		X	X	X	X	X	X	X	X	X		X	X					12
Kyrgyzstan		X				X	X	X		X	X	X	X						8
Latvia													X						1
Lithuania								X					X	X					3
Macedonia				X	X														2
Moldova	X		X																2
Mongolia	X	X				X	X								X			X	6
Namibia						X													1
Nigeria			X																1
North Korea	X																		1
Norway												X							1
Palau													X						1
Peru									X										1
Poland				X		X	X	X	X	X	X		X	X					9
Portugal									X										1
Puerto Rico																X			1
Qatar		X																	1
Romania					X		X	X	X				X						5
Russia	X	X	X	X	X	X	X	X	X	X	X	X	X	X	X	X	X	X	18
Senegal					X														1
Serbia and Montenegro									X										1
Slovakia			X			X						X							3
South Africa	X																		1
South Korea	X	X	X		X			X	X	X	X					X			9
Spain										X	X								2
Sweden										X	X	X	X	X		X	X		7
Switzerland						X					X								2
Tajikistan				X	X										X		X		4
Tunisia															X				1
Turkey	X	X	X		X	X	X	X	X	X		X	X	X					12
Ukraine	X	X	X		X	X	X	X	X	X	X	X	X		X	X	X	X	16
United States	X	X	X	X	X	X	X	X	X	X		X	X	X	X	X	X	X	17
Uzbekistan	X	X	X			X	X				X		X						7
Venezuela														X	X				2
Total: 67 NOCs	22	21	21	21	22	21	20	22	22	20	20	20	22	20	14	12	12	12	344

== Men's freestyle events ==
=== 55 kg ===
Competition	Places	Qualified wrestlers
Host Country	1	Amiran Kardanov (GRE)
2003 World Championships	10	Dilshod Mansurov (UZB); Ghenadie Tulbea (MDA); Oleksandr Zakharuk (UKR); Mohammad Aslani (IRI); Stephen Abas (USA); Chikara Tanabe (JPN); Ramazan Demir (TUR); Bauyrzhan Orazgaliyev (KAZ); Bayaraagiin Naranbaatar (MGL); Shaun Williams (RSA)
1st Qualification Tournament	5	René Montero (CUB); Herman Kantoyeu (BLR); Martin Berberyan (ARM); Namig Abdullayev (AZE); Li Zhengyu (CHN)
2nd Qualification Tournament	4	Yogeshwar Dutt (IND); Kim Hyo-sub (KOR); Aleksandr Kontoev (RUS); Radoslav Velikov (BUL)
Invitational	2	Bashir Ahmad Rahmati (AFG); O Song-nam (PRK)
Total	22	

=== 60 kg ===
Competition	Places	Qualified wrestlers
Host Country	1	Besik Aslanasvili (GRE)
2003 World Championships	10	Arif Abdullayev (AZE) (Note: The quota remained unused); Yandro Quintana (CUB); Song Jae-myung (KOR); Sushil Kumar (IND); David Pogosian (GEO); Tevfik Odabaşı (TUR); Ulan Nadyrbek Uulu (KGZ); Damir Zakhartdinov (UZB); Lubos Cikel (AUT); Eric Guerrero (USA)
1st Qualification Tournament	5	Kamal Ustarkhanov (RUS); Anatolie Guidea (BUL); Vasyl Fedoryshyn (UKR); Guivi Sissaouri (CAN); Masoud Mostafa-Jokar (IRI)
2nd Qualification Tournament	4	Kenji Inoue (JPN); Abdulrahman Ibrahim (QAT); Gergõ Wöller (HUN); Oyuunbilegiin Pürevbaatar (MGL)
Invitational	1	Sahit Prizreni (ALB)
Total	21	

=== 66 kg ===
Competition	Places	Qualified wrestlers
Host Country	1	Nikolaos Loizidis (GRE)
2003 World Championships	10	Irbek Farniev (RUS); Serafim Barzakov (BUL); Kazuhiko Ikematsu (JPN); Serguei Rondón (CUB); Otar Tushishvili (GEO); Elbrus Tedeyev (UKR); Evan MacDonald (CAN); Gergő Szabó (HUN); Štefan Fernyák (SVK); Ruslan Bodișteanu (MDA)
1st Qualification Tournament	5	Leonid Spiridonov (KAZ); Artur Tavkazakhov (UZB); Chris Bono (USA); Baek Jin-kuk (KOR); Alireza Dabir (IRI)
2nd Qualification Tournament	4	Zhirayr Hovhannisyan (ARM); Elman Asgarov (AZE); Ramesh Kumar (IND); Ömer Çubukçu (TUR)
Invitational	1	Fred Jessey (NGR)
Total	21	

=== 74 kg ===
Competition	Places	Qualified wrestlers
Host Country	1	Felix Polianidis (GRE)
2003 World Championships	10	Buvaisar Saitiev (RUS); Murad Gaidarov (BLR); Gennadiy Laliyev (KAZ); Hadi Habibi (IRI); Sihamir Osmanov (MKD); Talgat Ilyasov (AUS); Árpád Ritter (HUN); Sujeet Maan (IND); Elnur Aslanov (AZE); Kunihiko Obata (JPN)
1st Qualification Tournament	5	Joe Williams (USA); Iván Fundora (CUB); Arayik Gevorgyan (ARM); Daniel Igali (CAN); Krystian Brzozowski (POL)
2nd Qualification Tournament	4	Nikolay Paslar (BUL); Gela Saghirashvili (GEO); Salvatore Rinella (ITA); Yusup Abdusalomov (TJK)
Invitational	1	Nate Ackerman (GBR)
Total	21	

=== 84 kg ===
Competition	Places	Qualified wrestlers
Host Country	1	Lazaros Loizidis (GRE)
2003 World Championships	10	Sazhid Sazhidov (RUS); Cael Sanderson (USA); Revaz Mindorashvili (GEO); Siarhei Borchanka (BLR); Magomed Kurugliyev (KAZ); Yoel Romero (CUB); Gökhan Yavaşer (TUR); Mamed Aghaev (ARM); Nicolae Ghiță (ROM); Vincent Aka-Akesse (FRA)
1st Qualification Tournament	5	Eldar Assanov (UKR); Hidekazu Yokoyama (JPN); Fereydoun Ghanbari (IRI); Moon Eui-jae (KOR); Arkadiy Tzopa (BUL)
2nd Qualification Tournament	4	Davyd Bichinashvili (GER); Shamil Aliev (TJK); Anuj Chaudhary (IND); Magomed Ibragimov (MKD)
Invitational	2	Jeff Cobb (GUM); Matar Sène (SEN)
Total	22	

=== 96 kg ===
Competition	Places	Qualified wrestlers
Host Country	1	Aftantil Xanthopoulos (GRE)
2003 World Championships	10	Eldar Kurtanidze (GEO); Alireza Heidari (IRI); Krasimir Kochev (BUL); Tüvshintöriin Enkhtuyaa (MGL); Daniel Cormier (USA); Nico Jacobs (NAM); Bartłomiej Bartnicki (POL); Vadim Tasoyev (UKR); Radovan Valach (AUT); Aleksandr Shemarov (BLR)
1st Qualification Tournament	5	Magomed Ibragimov (UZB); Fatih Çakıroğlu (TUR); Rustam Aghayev (AZE); Wang Yuanyuan (CHN); Rolf Scherrer (SUI)
2nd Qualification Tournament	4	Aleksey Krupnyakov (KGZ); Peter Pecha (SVK); Islam Bayramukov (KAZ); Giorgi Gogshelidze (RUS)
Invitational	1	Antoine Jaoude (BRA)
Total	21	

=== 120 kg ===
Competition	Places	Qualified wrestlers
Host Country	1	Efstathios Topalidis (GRE)
2003 World Championships	10	Artur Taymazov (UZB); Kerry McCoy (USA); Alireza Rezaei (IRI); Serhii Priadun (UKR); Marid Mutalimov (KAZ); Barys Hrynkevich (BLR); Alex Modebadze (GEO); Ottó Aubéli (HUN); Gelegjamtsyn Ösökhbayar (MGL); Sven Thiele (GER)
1st Qualification Tournament	5	Alexis Rodríguez (CUB); Kuramagomed Kuramagomedov (RUS); Francesco Miano-Petta (ITA); Marek Garmulewicz (POL); Recep Kara (TUR)
2nd Qualification Tournament	4	Bozhidar Boyadzhiev (BUL); Palwinder Singh Cheema (IND); Rareș Chintoan (ROM); Yury Mildzihov (KGZ)
Invitational	0	—
Total	20	

== Men's Greco-Roman events ==
=== 55 kg ===
Competition	Places	Qualified wrestlers
Host Country	1	Artiom Kiouregkian (GRE)
2003 World Championships	10	Dariusz Jabłoński (POL); Im Dae-won (KOR); Lázaro Rivas (CUB); Petr Švehla (CZE); Marian Sandu (ROM); Uran Kalilov (KGZ); Hassan Rangraz (IRI); Håkan Nyblom (DEN); Svajūnas Adomaitis (LTU); Oleksiy Vakulenko (UKR)
1st Qualification Tournament	5	Brandon Paulson (USA); Ercan Yıldız (TUR); István Majoros (HUN); Irakli Chochua (GEO); Sheng Jiang (CHN)
2nd Qualification Tournament	4	Masatoshi Toyota (JPN); Geidar Mamedaliyev (RUS); Nurbakyt Tengizbayev (KAZ); Mukesh Khatri (IND)
Invitational	2	Samir Benchenaf (ALG); Jansel Ramírez (DOM)
Total	22	

=== 60 kg ===
Competition	Places	Qualified wrestlers
Host Country	1	Christos Gikas (GRE)
2003 World Championships	10	Armen Nazaryan (BUL); Roberto Monzón (CUB); Eusebiu Diaconu (ROM); Jim Gruenwald (USA); Akaki Chachua (GEO); Włodzimierz Zawadzki (POL); Bünyamin Emik (TUR); Ashraf El-Gharably (EGY); Oleksandr Khvoshch (UKR); Jurij Kohl (GER)
1st Qualification Tournament	5	Makoto Sasamoto (JPN); Jung Ji-hyun (KOR); Paolo Fucile (ITA); Aleksey Shevtsov (RUS); Wang Shugang (CHN) (Note: Sherzod Khudoyberdiev from Uzbekistan initially finished first and secured a quota place at the first Olympic Qualifier but failed the drug test, the nation's license would have been awarded to Serbia and Montenegro, but the country also earned the quota at the second Olympic Qualifier. Instead, China, who finished in seventh, took the unused berth.)
2nd Qualification Tournament	4	Nurlan Koizhaiganov (KAZ); Davor Štefanek (SCG); Ali Ashkani (IRI); Vitaliy Rahimov (AZE)
Invitational	2	Sidney Guzman (PER); Hugo Passos (POR)
Total	22	

=== 66 kg ===
Competition	Places	Qualified wrestlers
Host Country	1	Georgios Boukis (GRE)
2003 World Championships	10	Manuchar Kvirkvelia (GEO); Armen Vardanyan (UKR); Levente Füredy (HUN); Vaghinak Galstyan (ARM); Şeref Eroğlu (TUR); Kim In-sub (KOR); Jannis Zamanduridis (GER); Farid Mansurov (AZE); Luis Izquierdo (COL); Jimmy Samuelsson (SWE)
1st Qualification Tournament	5	Nikolay Gergov (BUL); Parviz Zeidvand (IRI); Ambako Vachadze (RUS); Mkhitar Manukyan (KAZ); Kevin Bracken (USA)
2nd Qualification Tournament	4	Juan Marén (CUB); Moisés Sánchez (ESP); Kanatbek Begaliev (KGZ); Ryszard Wolny (POL)
Invitational	0	—
Total	20	

=== 74 kg ===
Competition	Places	Qualified wrestlers
Host Country	1	Georgios Tziolas (GRE)
2003 World Championships	10	Aleksey Glushkov (RUS); Konstantin Schneider (GER); Kim Jin-soo (KOR); Danil Khalimov (KAZ); Volodymyr Shatskykh (UKR); Aliaksandr Kikiniou (BLR); Marko Yli-Hannuksela (FIN); Yasha Manasherov (ISR); Vugar Aslanov (AZE); Katsuhiko Nagata (JPN)
1st Qualification Tournament	5	Filiberto Azcuy (CUB); Aleksandr Dokturishvili (UZB); Mohammad Babulfath (SWE); Saiyinjiya (CHN); Radosław Truszkowski (POL)
2nd Qualification Tournament	4	Tamás Berzicza (HUN); Daniar Kobonov (KGZ); Reto Bucher (SUI); José Alberto Recuero (ESP)
Invitational	0	—
Total	20	

=== 84 kg ===
Competition	Places	Qualified wrestlers
Host Country	1	Theodoros Tounousidis (GRE)
2003 World Championships	10	Gocha Tsitsiashvili (ISR); Ara Abrahamian (SWE); Attila Bátky (SVK); Fritz Aanes (NOR); Brad Vering (USA); Mukhran Vakhtangadze (GEO); Hamza Yerlikaya (TUR); Viachaslau Makaranka (BLR); Mélonin Noumonvi (FRA); Tarvi Thomberg (EST)
1st Qualification Tournament	5	Aleksey Mishin (RUS); Oleksandr Daragan (UKR); Andrea Minguzzi (ITA); Janarbek Kenjeev (KGZ); Mohamed Abdelfatah (EGY)
2nd Qualification Tournament	4	Behrouz Jamshidi (IRI); Levon Geghamyan (ARM); Shingo Matsumoto (JPN); Vladislav Metodiev (BUL)
Invitational	0	—
Total	20	

=== 96 kg ===
Competition	Places	Qualified wrestlers
Host Country	1	Konstantinos Thanos (GRE)
2003 World Championships	10	Martin Lidberg (SWE); Karam Gaber (EGY); Ramaz Nozadze (GEO); Davyd Saldadze (UKR); Aleksey Cheglakov (UZB); Aleksandr Bezruchkin (RUS); Gennady Chkhaidze (KGZ); Lajos Virág (HUN); Mirko Englich (GER); Marek Sitnik (POL)
1st Qualification Tournament	5	Ernesto Peña (CUB); Mindaugas Ežerskis (LTU); Mehmet Özal (TUR); Ali Mollov (BUL); Garrett Lowney (USA)
2nd Qualification Tournament	4	Masoud Hashemzadeh (IRI); Sergey Lishtvan (BLR); Petru Sudureac (ROM); Asset Mambetov (KAZ)
Invitational	2	Igors Kostins (LAT); John Tarkong (PLW)
Total	22	

=== 120 kg ===
Competition	Places	Qualified wrestlers
Host Country	1	Xenofon Koutsioumpas (GRE)
2003 World Championships	10	Khasan Baroev (RUS); Mihály Deák-Bárdos (HUN); Georgiy Tsurtsumia (KAZ); Mindaugas Mizgaitis (LTU); Sergei Mureiko (BUL); Juha Ahokas (FIN); Yannick Szczepaniak (FRA); Haykaz Galstyan (ARM); Rulon Gardner (USA); Dmitry Debelka (BLR)
1st Qualification Tournament	5	Mijaín López (CUB); Yekta Yılmaz Gül (TUR); Mirian Giorgadze (GEO); Yuri Evseichik (ISR); Eddy Bengtsson (SWE)
2nd Qualification Tournament	4	Sajjad Barzi (IRI); Marek Mikulski (POL); David Vála (CZE); Rafael Barreno (VEN) (Note: Giuseppe Giunta from Italy originally finished fourth and secured a quota place but was injured later, Italy didn't replace him with another wrestler, the quota went to the fifth ranked wrestler from Venezuela.)
Invitational	0	—
Total	20	

== Women's freestyle events ==
=== 48 kg ===
Competition	Places	Qualified wrestlers
Host Country	1	Fani Psatha (GRE)
2003 World Championships	5	Iryna Merleni (UKR); Patricia Miranda (USA); Li Hui (CHN); Makiko Sakamoto (JPN); Angélique Berthenet (FRA)
1st Qualification Tournament	3	Brigitte Wagner (GER); Lilia Kaskarakova (RUS); Mayelis Caripá (VEN)
2nd Qualification Tournament	3	Lyndsay Belisle (CAN); Tsogtbazaryn Enkhjargal (MGL); Lidiya Karamchakova (TJK)
Invitational	2	Leopoldina Ross (GBS); Fadhila Louati (TUN)
Total	14	

=== 55 kg ===
Competition	Places	Qualified wrestlers
Host Country	1	Sofia Poumpouridou (GRE)
2003 World Championships	5	Saori Yoshida (JPN); Tina George (USA); Natalia Golts (RUS); Sun Dongmei (CHN); Mabel Fonseca (PUR)
1st Qualification Tournament	3	Lee Na-lae (KOR); Diletta Giampiccolo (ITA); Tetyana Lazareva (UKR)
2nd Qualification Tournament	3	Anna Gomis (FRA); Ida-Theres Karlsson (SWE); Tonya Verbeek (CAN)
Invitational	0	—
Total	12	

=== 63 kg ===
Competition	Places	Qualified wrestlers
Host Country	1	Agoro Papavasileiou (GRE)
2003 World Championships	5	Kaori Icho (JPN); Sara McMann (USA); Viola Yanik (CAN); Lyudmyla Holovchenko (UKR); Alena Kartashova (RUS)
1st Qualification Tournament	3	Meng Lili (CHN); Sara Eriksson (SWE); Natalia Ivanova (TJK)
2nd Qualification Tournament	3	Lise Legrand (FRA); Stéphanie Groß (GER); Volha Khilko (BLR)
Invitational	0	—
Total	12	

=== 72 kg ===
Competition	Places	Qualified wrestlers
Host Country	1	Aikaterini Siavou (GRE)
2003 World Championships	5	Kyoko Hamaguchi (JPN); Toccara Montgomery (USA); Wang Xu (CHN); Stanka Zlateva (BUL); Anita Schätzle (GER)
1st Qualification Tournament	3	Christine Nordhagen (CAN); Svetlana Saenko (UKR); Guzel Manyurova (RUS)
2nd Qualification Tournament	3	Marina Gastl (AUT); Katarzyna Juszczak (ITA); Ochirbatyn Burmaa (MGL)
Invitational	0	—
Total	12	
