= 2003 World Wrestling Championships – Men's Greco-Roman 55 kg =

Men's Greco-Roman 55 kg at the 2003 World Championships
- Venue: Palais des Sports Robert Oubron
- Dates: 2–4 October 2003
- Competitors: 35 from 35 nations

Medalists
gold medal	Dariusz Jabłoński	Poland
silver medal	Im Dae-won	South Korea
bronze medal	Lázaro Rivas	Cuba

The men's Greco-Roman 55 kilograms is a competition featured at the 2003 World Wrestling Championships, and was held at the Palais des Sports Robert Oubron in Créteil, France from 2 to 4 October 2003.

== Results ==
=== Preliminary round ===
==== Pool 1 ====
Pos	Athlete	Pld	W	L	CP	TP	UKR	AZE	POR
1	Oleksiy Vakulenko (UKR)	2	2	0	7	23	—	8–2	15–4
2	Natig Eyvazov (AZE)	2	1	1	4	12	1–3 PP	—	10–0
3	Paulo Gonçalves (POR)	2	0	2	1	4	1–4 SP	0–4 ST	—

Source: Official website

==== Pool 2 ====
Pos	Athlete	Pld	W	L	CP	TP	KOR	JPN	FIN
1	Im Dae-won (KOR)	2	2	0	7	14	—	4–0	10–0
2	Masatoshi Toyota (JPN)	2	1	1	3	5	0–3 PO	—	5–3
3	Tero Katajisto (FIN)	2	0	2	1	3	0–4 ST	1–3 PP	—

Source: Official website

==== Pool 3 ====
Pos	Athlete	Pld	W	L	CP	TP	ROM	RUS	GER
1	Marian Sandu (ROM)	2	2	0	6	11	—	7–0	4–3
2	Oleg Nemchenko (RUS)	2	1	1	3	3	0–3 PO	—	3–1
3	Oleg Kutscherenko (GER)	2	0	2	2	4	1–3 PP	1–3 PP	—

Source: Official website

==== Pool 4 ====
Pos	Athlete	Pld	W	L	CP	TP	BLR	CHN	NOR
1	Barys Radkevich (BLR)	2	1	1	4	6	—	4–2	2–5
2	Wang Hui (CHN)	2	1	1	4	5	1–3 PP	—	3–0
3	Stig-André Berge (NOR)	2	1	1	3	5	3–1 PP	0–3 PO	—

Source: Official website

==== Pool 5 ====
Pos	Athlete	Pld	W	L	CP	TP	KGZ	VEN	ESP
1	Uran Kalilov (KGZ)	2	2	0	8	21	—	10–0	11–0
2	Eduardo Freites (VEN)	2	1	1	3	7	0–4 ST	—	7–0
3	Vicente Lillo (ESP)	2	0	2	0	0	0–4 ST	0–3 PO	—

Source: Official website

==== Pool 6 ====
Pos	Athlete	Pld	W	L	CP	TP	LTU	SWE	FRA
1	Svajūnas Adomaitis (LTU)	2	2	0	6	6	—	3–0	3–2
2	Kim Holk (SWE)	2	1	1	3	5	0–3 PO	—	5–4
3	Hamou Oubrick (FRA)	2	0	2	2	6	1–3 PP	1–3 PP	—

Source: Official website

==== Pool 7 ====
Pos	Athlete	Pld	W	L	CP	TP	CUB	USA	UZB
1	Lázaro Rivas (CUB)	2	2	0	7	17	—	5–0	12–1
2	Brandon Paulson (USA)	2	1	1	3	5	0–3 PO	—	5–0
3	Kamol Kholmatov (UZB)	2	0	2	1	1	1–4 SP	0–3 PO	—

Source: Official website

==== Pool 8 ====
Pos	Athlete	Pld	W	L	CP	TP	POL	ARM	KAZ
1	Dariusz Jabłoński (POL)	2	1	1	4	5	—	3–0	2–3
2	Roman Amoyan (ARM)	2	1	1	3	3	0–3 PO	—	3–0
3	Asset Imanbayev (KAZ)	2	1	1	3	3	3–1 PP	0–3 PO	—

Source: Official website

==== Pool 9 ====
Pos	Athlete	Pld	W	L	CP	TP	DEN	GRE	EGY
1	Håkan Nyblom (DEN)	2	2	0	6	6	—	3–2	3–0
2	Artiom Kiouregkian (GRE)	2	1	1	4	5	1–3 PP	—	3–0
3	Mohamed Abou El-Ela (EGY)	2	0	2	0	0	0–3 PO	0–3 PO	—

Source: Official website

==== Pool 10 ====
Pos	Athlete	Pld	W	L	CP	TP	CZE	HUN	QAT	BUL
1	Petr Švehla (CZE)	3	3	0	9	12	—	3–0	4–0	5–0
2	István Majoros (HUN)	3	2	1	8	21	0–3 PO	—	10–0	11–0
3	Mahmoud Ibrahim Ahmed (QAT)	3	1	2	3	5	0–3 PO	0–4 ST	—	5–1
4	Tenyo Tenev (BUL)	3	0	3	1	1	0–3 PO	0–4 ST	1–3 PP	—

Source: Official website

==== Pool 11 ====
Pos	Athlete	Pld	W	L	CP	TP	IRI	GEO	TUR	IND
1	Hassan Rangraz (IRI)	3	3	0	9	16	—	6–0	4–2	6–0
2	Irakli Chochua (GEO)	3	1	2	4	6	0–3 PO	—	4–0	2–9
3	Ercan Yıldız (TUR)	3	1	2	4	5	1–3 PP	0–3 PO	—	3–0
4	Mukesh Khatri (IND)	3	1	2	3	9	0–3 PO	3–1 PP	0–3 PO	—

Source: Official website

=== Knockout round ===
Round of 16
Oleksiy Vakulenko (UKR)	4
Im Dae-won (KOR)	12
Marian Sandu (ROM)	4
Barys Radkevich (BLR)	0
Uran Kalilov (KGZ)	7
Svajūnas Adomaitis (LTU)	4

Quarterfinals
Im Dae-won (KOR)	5
Marian Sandu (ROM)	2
Uran Kalilov (KGZ)	2
Lázaro Rivas (CUB)	4
Dariusz Jabłoński (POL)	5
Håkan Nyblom (DEN)	0
Petr Švehla (CZE)	3
Hassan Rangraz (IRI)	0

Semifinals
Im Dae-won (KOR)	4
Lázaro Rivas (CUB)	1
Dariusz Jabłoński (POL)	3
Petr Švehla (CZE)	0

Final
Im Dae-won (KOR)	5
Dariusz Jabłoński (POL)	6
Bronze medal match
Lázaro Rivas (CUB)	5
Petr Švehla (CZE)	1
