= 1999 World Wrestling Championships – Men's Greco-Roman 54 kg =

Men's Greco-Roman 54 kg at the 1999 World Championships
- Venue: Peace and Friendship Stadium
- Dates: 23–25 September 1999
- Competitors: 38 from 38 nations

Medalists
gold medal	Lázaro Rivas	Cuba
silver medal	Ha Tae-yeon	South Korea
bronze medal	Alfred Ter-Mkrtchyan	Germany

The men's Greco-Roman 54 kilograms is a competition featured at the 1999 World Wrestling Championships, and was held at the Peace and Friendship Stadium in Piraeus, Athens, Greece from 23 to 25 September 1999.

== Results ==
Legend

- F — Won by fall

=== Preliminary round ===
==== Pool 1 ====
Pos	Athlete	Pld	W	L	CP	TP	FIN	GRE	MEX
1	Tero Katajisto (FIN)	2	2	0	7	16	—	5–0	11–4 Fall
2	Viatseslav Giali (GRE)	2	1	1	4	19	0–3 PO	—	19–8
3	Ernesto Salazar (MEX)	2	0	2	1	12	0–4 TO	1–4 SP	—

Source: Official website

==== Pool 2 ====
Pos	Athlete	Pld	W	L	CP	TP	CUB	ROM	JPN
1	Lázaro Rivas (CUB)	2	2	0	8	22	—	10–0	12–0
2	Marian Sandu (ROM)	2	1	1	4	15	0–4 ST	—	15–3
3	Masatsune Sasaki (JPN)	2	0	2	1	3	0–4 ST	1–4 SP	—

Source: Official website

==== Pool 3 ====
Pos	Athlete	Pld	W	L	CP	TP	BUL	GEO	LTU
1	Simeon Milev (BUL)	2	2	0	6	6	—	3–1	3–1
2	Aleksandr Tsertsvadze (GEO)	2	1	1	5	8	1–3 PP	—	7–1 Fall
3	Ruslan Vartanov (LTU)	2	0	2	1	2	1–3 PP	0–4 TO	—

Source: Official website

==== Pool 4 ====
Pos	Athlete	Pld	W	L	CP	TP	PRK	TUR	ITA
1	Kang Yong-gyun (PRK)	2	2	0	6	11	—	6–1	5–3
2	Ercan Yıldız (TUR)	2	1	1	4	9	1–3 PP	—	8–4
3	Francesco Costantino (ITA)	2	0	2	2	7	1–3 PP	1–3 PP	—

Source: Official website

==== Pool 5 ====
Pos	Athlete	Pld	W	L	CP	TP	ARM	USA	KGZ
1	Artashes Minasyan (ARM)	2	2	0	6	7	—	3–0	4–3
2	Steven Mays (USA)	2	1	1	3	8	0–3 PO	—	8–2
3	Uran Kalilov (KGZ)	2	0	2	2	5	1–3 PP	1–3 PP	—

Source: Official website

==== Pool 6 ====
Pos	Athlete	Pld	W	L	CP	TP	RUS	POL	LAT
1	Boris Ambartsumov (RUS)	2	2	0	6	17	—	8–0	9–0
2	Dariusz Jabłoński (POL)	2	1	1	3	4	0–3 PO	—	4–0
3	Zigmunds Jansons (LAT)	2	0	2	0	0	0–3 PO	0–3 PO	—

Source: Official website

==== Pool 7 ====
Pos	Athlete	Pld	W	L	CP	TP	CHN	FRA	SWE
1	Wang Hui (CHN)	2	2	0	7	10	—	4–1	6–8 Fall
2	Salah Belguidoum (FRA)	2	1	1	5	12	1–3 PP	—	11–0
3	Kim Holk (SWE)	2	0	2	0	8	0–4 TO	0–4 ST	—

Source: Official website

==== Pool 8 ====
Pos	Athlete	Pld	W	L	CP	TP	GER	UKR	IRI
1	Alfred Ter-Mkrtchyan (GER)	2	2	0	7	16	—	5–1	11–0 Fall
2	Andriy Kalashnikov (UKR)	2	1	1	4	4	1–3 PP	—	3–2
3	Hassan Rangraz (IRI)	2	0	2	1	2	0–4 TO	1–3 PP	—

Source: Official website

==== Pool 9 ====
Pos	Athlete	Pld	W	L	CP	TP	CZE	MDA	ESP
1	Petr Švehla (CZE)	2	2	0	7	16	—	10–0	6–0
2	Grigore Buliga (MDA)	2	1	1	3	9	0–4 ST	—	9–1
3	Vicente Lillo (ESP)	2	0	2	1	1	0–3 PO	1–3 PP	—

Source: Official website

==== Pool 10 ====
Pos	Athlete	Pld	W	L	CP	TP	AZE	NOR	TKM
1	Natig Eyvazov (AZE)	2	2	0	8	21	—	10–0	11–0
2	Robert Sollie (NOR)	2	1	1	3	3	0–4 ST	—	3–2
3	Nepes Gukulow (TKM)	2	0	2	1	2	0–4 ST	1–3 PP	—

Source: Official website

==== Pool 11 ====
Pos	Athlete	Pld	W	L	CP	TP	KOR	BLR	YEM	POR
1	Ha Tae-yeon (KOR)	3	3	0	11	9	—	3–0	4–0 Fall	2–0 Ret
2	Barys Radkevich (BLR)	3	2	1	8	10	0–3 PO	—	10–0	WO
3	Abdullah Al-Izani (YEM)	3	1	2	4	0	0–4 TO	0–4 ST	—	WO
4	Paulo Gonçalves (POR)	3	0	3	0	0	0–4 PA	0–4 PA	0–4 PA	—

Source: Official website

==== Pool 12 ====
Pos	Athlete	Pld	W	L	CP	TP	UZB	KAZ	HUN	DEN
1	Shamsiddin Khudoyberdiev (UZB)	3	3	0	10	20	—	4–2	6–2	10–0
2	Rakymzhan Assembekov (KAZ)	3	2	1	8	11	1–3 PP	—	5–1	4–0 Fall
3	Tibor Oláh (HUN)	3	1	2	5	10	1–3 PP	1–3 PP	—	7–5
4	Håkan Nyblom (DEN)	3	0	3	1	5	0–4 ST	0–4 TO	1–3 PP	—

Source: Official website

=== Knockout round ===
Round of 16
Tero Katajisto (FIN)	2
Lázaro Rivas (CUB)	7
Simeon Milev (BUL)	0
Kang Yong-gyun (PRK)	10
Artashes Minasyan (ARM)	0
Boris Ambartsumov (RUS)	7
Wang Hui (CHN)	0
Alfred Ter-Mkrtchyan (GER)	8
Petr Švehla (CZE)	3
Natig Eyvazov (AZE)	1
Ha Tae-yeon (KOR)	3
Shamsiddin Khudoyberdiev (UZB)	0
Aleksandr Tsertsvadze (GEO)	4
Salah Belguidoum (FRA)	4
Barys Radkevich (BLR)	2
Rakymzhan Assembekov (KAZ)	6^{F}

Quarterfinals
Lázaro Rivas (CUB)	11
Kang Yong-gyun (PRK)	0
Boris Ambartsumov (RUS)	1
Alfred Ter-Mkrtchyan (GER)	4
Petr Švehla (CZE)	0
Ha Tae-yeon (KOR)	4
Aleksandr Tsertsvadze (GEO)	0
Rakymzhan Assembekov (KAZ)	7

Semifinals
Lázaro Rivas (CUB)	5
Alfred Ter-Mkrtchyan (GER)	3
Ha Tae-yeon (KOR)	2
Rakymzhan Assembekov (KAZ)	0

Final
Lázaro Rivas (CUB)	7
Ha Tae-yeon (KOR)	0
Bronze medal match
Alfred Ter-Mkrtchyan (GER)	3
Rakymzhan Assembekov (KAZ)	0
