= 2002 World Wrestling Championships – Men's Greco-Roman 55 kg =

Men's Greco-Roman 55 kg at the 2002 World Championships
- Venue: Universal Sports Hall CSKA
- Dates: 20–21 September 2002
- Competitors: 29 from 29 nations

Medalists
gold medal	Geidar Mamedaliyev	Russia
silver medal	Nepes Gukulow	Turkmenistan
bronze medal	Hassan Rangraz	Iran

The men's Greco-Roman 55 kilograms is a competition featured at the 2002 World Wrestling Championships, and was held at the Universal Sports Hall CSKA in Moscow, Russia from 20 to 21 September 2002.

== Results ==
Legend

- F — Won by fall

=== Preliminary round ===
==== Pool 1 ====
Pos	Athlete	Pld	W	L	CP	TP	IRI	BLR	HUN
1	Hassan Rangraz (IRI)	2	2	0	7	22	—	12–3 Fall	10–9
2	Barys Radkevich (BLR)	2	1	1	3	9	0–4 TO	—	6–3
3	Tibor Oláh (HUN)	2	0	2	2	12	1–3 PP	1–3 PP	—

Source: Official website

==== Pool 2 ====
Pos	Athlete	Pld	W	L	CP	TP	GEO	UZB	DEN
1	Irakli Chochua (GEO)	2	2	0	6	14	—	8–5	6–2
2	Kamol Kholmatov (UZB)	2	1	1	4	11	1–3 PP	—	6–0
3	Anders Nyblom (DEN)	2	0	2	1	2	1–3 PP	0–3 PO	—

Source: Official website

==== Pool 3 ====
Pos	Athlete	Pld	W	L	CP	TP	TUR	KAZ	SWE
1	Ercan Yıldız (TUR)	2	2	0	6	5	—	1–1	4–0
2	Rakymzhan Assembekov (KAZ)	2	1	1	4	6	1–3 PP	—	5–0
3	Kim Holk (SWE)	2	0	2	0	0	0–3 PO	0–3 PO	—

Source: Official website

==== Pool 4 ====
Pos	Athlete	Pld	W	L	CP	TP	ROM	VEN	BUL
1	Marian Sandu (ROM)	2	2	0	7	16	—	11–0	5–3
2	Jorge Cardozo (VEN)	2	1	1	3	9	0–4 ST	—	9–4
3	Tenyo Tenev (BUL)	2	0	2	2	7	1–3 PP	1–3 PP	—

Source: Official website

==== Pool 5 ====
Pos	Athlete	Pld	W	L	CP	TP	TKM	JPN	KOR
1	Nepes Gukulow (TKM)	2	2	0	6	11	—	6–5	5–4
2	Tomoya Murata (JPN)	2	1	1	4	9	1–3 PP	—	4–2
3	Ha Tae-yeon (KOR)	2	0	2	2	6	1–3 PP	1–3 PP	—

Source: Official website

==== Pool 6 ====
Pos	Athlete	Pld	W	L	CP	TP	RUS	POL	KGZ
1	Geidar Mamedaliyev (RUS)	2	2	0	6	6	—	3–0	3–0
2	Dariusz Jabłoński (POL)	2	1	1	4	0	0–3 PO	—	WO
3	Uran Kalilov (KGZ)	2	0	2	0	0	0–3 PO	0–4 EF	—

Source: Official website

==== Pool 7 ====
Pos	Athlete	Pld	W	L	CP	TP	USA	FIN	FRA
1	Brandon Paulson (USA)	2	2	0	7	15	—	4–0	11–0
2	Pasi Huhtala (FIN)	2	1	1	3	8	0–3 PO	—	8–2
3	Hamou Oubrick (FRA)	2	0	2	1	2	0–4 ST	1–3 PP	—

Source: Official website

==== Pool 8 ====
Pos	Athlete	Pld	W	L	CP	TP	ARM	GER	CUB	CHN
1	Ashot Khachatryan (ARM)	3	3	0	10	17	—	4–2	3–0	10–0
2	Alfred Ter-Mkrtchyan (GER)	3	2	1	7	10	1–3 PP	—	4–0	4–0
3	Osmany Duca (CUB)	3	1	2	3	3	0–3 PO	0–3 PO	—	3–0
4	Hu Kewei (CHN)	3	0	3	0	0	0–4 ST	0–3 PO	0–3 PO	—

Source: Official website

==== Pool 9 ====
Pos	Athlete	Pld	W	L	CP	TP	GRE	UKR	EGY	TPE
1	Artiom Kiouregkian (GRE)	3	3	0	10	23	—	6–5	6–1	11–0
2	Oleksiy Vakulenko (UKR)	3	2	1	9	28	1–3 PP	—	10–0	13–0
3	Mohamed Abou El-Ela (EGY)	3	1	2	5	12	1–3 PP	0–4 ST	—	11–0
4	Kuo Sheng-pin (TPE)	3	0	3	0	0	0–4 ST	0–4 ST	0–4 ST	—

Source: Official website

=== Knockout round ===
Round of 16
Hassan Rangraz (IRI)	13^{F}
Irakli Chochua (GEO)	4

Quarterfinals
Hassan Rangraz (IRI)	8
Ercan Yıldız (TUR)	3
Marian Sandu (ROM)	3
Nepes Gukulow (TKM)	7
Geidar Mamedaliyev (RUS)	3
Brandon Paulson (USA)	1
Ashot Khachatryan (ARM)	9
Artiom Kiouregkian (GRE)	3

Semifinals
Hassan Rangraz (IRI)	11
Nepes Gukulow (TKM)	3^{F}
Geidar Mamedaliyev (RUS)	4
Ashot Khachatryan (ARM)	3

Final
Nepes Gukulow (TKM)	0
Geidar Mamedaliyev (RUS)	4
Bronze medal match
Hassan Rangraz (IRI)	10
Ashot Khachatryan (ARM)	0
