= 1998 World Wrestling Championships – Men's Greco-Roman 54 kg =

Men's Greco-Roman 54 kg at the 1998 World Championships
- Venue: Gavlerinken
- Dates: 27–29 August 1998
- Competitors: 30 from 30 nations

Medalists
gold medal	Sim Kwon-ho	South Korea
silver medal	Marian Sandu	Romania
bronze medal	Khaled Al-Faraj	Syria

The men's Greco-Roman 54 kilograms is a competition featured at the 1998 World Wrestling Championships, and was held at the Gavlerinken in Gävle, Sweden from 27 to 29 August 1998.

== Results ==
=== Round 1 ===
	Score	
Round of 32
Marian Sandu (ROM)	11–0	Robert Sollie (NOR)
Armen Tovmasyan (ARM)	6–0	Bahman Tayyebi (IRI)
Khaled Al-Faraj (SYR)	8–2	Dariusz Jabłoński (POL)
József Hamzok (HUN)	9–0	Andrew Hutchinson (CAN)
Andriy Kalashnikov (UKR)	3–9	Zigmunds Jansons (LAT)
Boris Ambartsumov (RUS)	9–0	Vitalie Ceban (MDA)
Tero Katajisto (FIN)	10–0	Boban Petrov (AUS)
Francesco Costantino (ITA)	7–3	Paulo Gonçalves (POR)
Yordan Anev (BUL)	0–7	Oleg Kutscherenko (GER)
Ruslan Vartanov (LTU)	0–1	Shawn Sheldon (USA)
Vicente Lillo (ESP)	1–3	Ercan Yıldız (TUR)
Barys Radkevich (BLR)	4–1	Joachim Söderman (SWE)
Salah Belguidoum (FRA)	1–5	Dilshod Aripov (UZB)
Sim Kwon-ho (KOR)	14–3	Moshe Grimberg (ISR)
Masatsune Sasaki (JPN)	3–7	Wang Hui (CHN)

=== Round 2 ===
	Score	
Round of 16
Marian Sandu (ROM)	11–3	Armen Tovmasyan (ARM)
Khaled Al-Faraj (SYR)	8–0 Fall	József Hamzok (HUN)
Zigmunds Jansons (LAT)	0–7	Boris Ambartsumov (RUS)
Tero Katajisto (FIN)	2–3	Francesco Costantino (ITA)
Oleg Kutscherenko (GER)	5–0	Shawn Sheldon (USA)
Ercan Yıldız (TUR)	1–2 Fall	Barys Radkevich (BLR)
Dilshod Aripov (UZB)	0–10	Sim Kwon-ho (KOR)
Wang Hui (CHN)		Bye
Repechage
Robert Sollie (NOR)	2–1	Bahman Tayyebi (IRI)
Dariusz Jabłoński (POL)	6–3	Andrew Hutchinson (CAN)
Andriy Kalashnikov (UKR)	2–0	Vitalie Ceban (MDA)
Boban Petrov (AUS)	6–16	Paulo Gonçalves (POR)
Yordan Anev (BUL)	0–1	Ruslan Vartanov (LTU)
Vicente Lillo (ESP)	0–2	Joachim Söderman (SWE)
Salah Belguidoum (FRA)	6–1	Moshe Grimberg (ISR)
Masatsune Sasaki (JPN)		Bye

=== Round 3 ===
	Score	
Quarterfinals
Wang Hui (CHN)	2–5	Marian Sandu (ROM)
Khaled Al-Faraj (SYR)	3–5 Fall	Boris Ambartsumov (RUS)
Francesco Costantino (ITA)	0–1	Oleg Kutscherenko (GER)
Barys Radkevich (BLR)	0–11	Sim Kwon-ho (KOR)
Repechage
Masatsune Sasaki (JPN)	5–1	Robert Sollie (NOR)
Dariusz Jabłoński (POL)	3–0	Andriy Kalashnikov (UKR)
Paulo Gonçalves (POR)	1–5 Fall	Ruslan Vartanov (LTU)
Joachim Söderman (SWE)	2–5	Salah Belguidoum (FRA)
Armen Tovmasyan (ARM)	10–0 Fall	József Hamzok (HUN)
Zigmunds Jansons (LAT)	3–0	Tero Katajisto (FIN)
Shawn Sheldon (USA)	2–1	Ercan Yıldız (TUR)
Dilshod Aripov (UZB)		Bye

=== Round 4 ===
	Score	
Repechage
Dilshod Aripov (UZB)	11–1	Masatsune Sasaki (JPN)
Dariusz Jabłoński (POL)	3–0	Ruslan Vartanov (LTU)
Salah Belguidoum (FRA)	8–4	Armen Tovmasyan (ARM)
Zigmunds Jansons (LAT)	0–0	Shawn Sheldon (USA)
Wang Hui (CHN)	1–3	Boris Ambartsumov (RUS)
Francesco Costantino (ITA)	4–7	Barys Radkevich (BLR)

=== Round 5 ===
	Score	
Semifinals
Marian Sandu (ROM)	6–5	Khaled Al-Faraj (SYR)
Oleg Kutscherenko (GER)	2–3	Sim Kwon-ho (KOR)
Repechage
Dilshod Aripov (UZB)	0–4	Dariusz Jabłoński (POL)
Salah Belguidoum (FRA)	0–4	Zigmunds Jansons (LAT)
Boris Ambartsumov (RUS)	10–0	Barys Radkevich (BLR)

=== Round 6 ===
	Score	
Repechage
Dariusz Jabłoński (POL)	3–1	Zigmunds Jansons (LAT)
Boris Ambartsumov (RUS)		Bye

=== Round 7 ===
	Score	
Repechage
Khaled Al-Faraj (SYR)	2–0	Oleg Kutscherenko (GER)
Boris Ambartsumov (RUS)	5–1	Dariusz Jabłoński (POL)

=== Finals ===
	Score	
Bronze medal match
Khaled Al-Faraj (SYR)	4–2	Boris Ambartsumov (RUS)
Final
Marian Sandu (ROM)	3–5	Sim Kwon-ho (KOR)
