= 1997 World Wrestling Championships – Men's Greco-Roman 54 kg =

Men's Greco-Roman 54 kg at the 1997 World Championships
- Venue: Hala Ludowa
- Dates: 10–12 September 1997
- Competitors: 28 from 28 nations

Medalists
gold medal	Ercan Yıldız	Turkey
silver medal	Vahan Juharyan	Armenia
bronze medal	Alfred Ter-Mkrtchyan	Germany

The men's Greco-Roman 54 kilograms is a competition featured at the 1997 World Wrestling Championships, and was held in Wrocław, Poland from 10 to 12 September 1997.

== Results ==
=== Round 1 ===
	Score	
Round of 32
Rakymzhan Assembekov (KAZ)	0–6	Lázaro Rivas (CUB)
Alfred Ter-Mkrtchyan (GER)	8–0	Charalampos Mouratidis (GRE)
Marian Sandu (ROM)	3–0	Ha Tae-yeon (KOR)
Piotr Jabłoński (POL)	3–2	Erik Charaturov (GEO)
Broderick Lee (USA)	0–1	Joachim Söderman (SWE)
Han Yuwei (CHN)	10–0	Francesco Costantino (ITA)
Salah Belguidoum (FRA)	1–4	Simeon Milev (BUL)
Oleg Nemchenko (RUS)	12–0	Petr Švehla (CZE)
Farhat Mageramov (BLR)	3–2	Masatsune Sasaki (JPN)
Andriy Kalashnikov (UKR)	12–0	Grigore Buliga (MDA)
Ercan Yıldız (TUR)	2–2	Tero Katajisto (FIN)
Dilshod Aripov (UZB)	5–0	David Ochoa (VEN)
Nik Zagranitchni (ISR)	0–4	Vahan Juharyan (ARM)
Zigmunds Jansons (LAT)	6–2	Namig Mustafayev (AZE)

=== Round 2 ===
	Score	
Round of 16
Lázaro Rivas (CUB)	0–4	Alfred Ter-Mkrtchyan (GER)
Marian Sandu (ROM)	1–0	Piotr Jabłoński (POL)
Joachim Söderman (SWE)	0–10	Han Yuwei (CHN)
Simeon Milev (BUL)	6–3	Oleg Nemchenko (RUS)
Farhat Mageramov (BLR)	3–7	Andriy Kalashnikov (UKR)
Ercan Yıldız (TUR)	3–2	Dilshod Aripov (UZB)
Vahan Juharyan (ARM)	4–2	Zigmunds Jansons (LAT)
Repechage
Rakymzhan Assembekov (KAZ)	3–4	Charalampos Mouratidis (GRE)
Ha Tae-yeon (KOR)	12–0	Erik Charaturov (GEO)
Broderick Lee (USA)	5–0	Francesco Costantino (ITA)
Salah Belguidoum (FRA)	5–0	Petr Švehla (CZE)
Masatsune Sasaki (JPN)	3–4	Grigore Buliga (MDA)
Tero Katajisto (FIN)	11–0	David Ochoa (VEN)
Nik Zagranitchni (ISR)	0–13	Namig Mustafayev (AZE)

=== Round 3 ===
	Score	
Quarterfinals
Alfred Ter-Mkrtchyan (GER)	2–4	Marian Sandu (ROM)
Han Yuwei (CHN)	2–3	Simeon Milev (BUL)
Andriy Kalashnikov (UKR)	0–1	Ercan Yıldız (TUR)
Vahan Juharyan (ARM)		Bye
Repechage
Charalampos Mouratidis (GRE)	0–10	Ha Tae-yeon (KOR)
Broderick Lee (USA)	1–4	Salah Belguidoum (FRA)
Grigore Buliga (MDA)	0–10	Tero Katajisto (FIN)
Namig Mustafayev (AZE)	3–4	Lázaro Rivas (CUB)
Piotr Jabłoński (POL)	3–0	Joachim Söderman (SWE)
Oleg Nemchenko (RUS)	6–5	Farhat Mageramov (BLR)
Dilshod Aripov (UZB)	0–6	Zigmunds Jansons (LAT)

=== Round 4 ===
	Score	
Repechage
Ha Tae-yeon (KOR)	6–0	Salah Belguidoum (FRA)
Tero Katajisto (FIN)	0–4	Lázaro Rivas (CUB)
Piotr Jabłoński (POL)	9–16	Oleg Nemchenko (RUS)
Zigmunds Jansons (LAT)	0–5	Alfred Ter-Mkrtchyan (GER)
Han Yuwei (CHN)	5–4	Andriy Kalashnikov (UKR)

=== Round 5 ===
	Score	
Semifinals
Vahan Juharyan (ARM)	2–1	Marian Sandu (ROM)
Simeon Milev (BUL)	0–1	Ercan Yıldız (TUR)
Repechage
Ha Tae-yeon (KOR)	5–2	Lázaro Rivas (CUB)
Oleg Nemchenko (RUS)	0–4	Alfred Ter-Mkrtchyan (GER)
Han Yuwei (CHN)		Bye

=== Round 6 ===
	Score	
Repechage
Han Yuwei (CHN)	4–10	Ha Tae-yeon (KOR)
Alfred Ter-Mkrtchyan (GER)		Bye

=== Round 7 ===
	Score	
Repechage
Marian Sandu (ROM)	4–0	Simeon Milev (BUL)
Alfred Ter-Mkrtchyan (GER)	4–0	Ha Tae-yeon (KOR)

=== Finals ===
	Score	
5th place match
Simeon Milev (BUL)	6–4	Ha Tae-yeon (KOR)
Bronze medal match
Marian Sandu (ROM)	0–1	Alfred Ter-Mkrtchyan (GER)
Final
Vahan Juharyan (ARM)	0–1	Ercan Yıldız (TUR)
