= 2001 World Wrestling Championships – Men's Greco-Roman 54 kg =

Men's Greco-Roman 54 kg at the 2001 World Championships
- Venue: Dimitris Tofalos Arena
- Dates: 6–8 December 2001
- Competitors: 27 from 27 nations

Medalists
gold medal	Hassan Rangraz	Iran
silver medal	Brandon Paulson	United States
bronze medal	Lázaro Rivas	Cuba

The men's Greco-Roman 55 kilograms is a competition featured at the 2001 World Wrestling Championships, and was held at the Dimitris Tofalos Arena in Patras, Greece from 6 to 8 December 2001.

== Results ==
=== Preliminary round ===
==== Pool 1 ====
Pos	Athlete	Pld	W	L	CP	TP	JPN	TUR	DEN
1	Tomoya Murata (JPN)	2	2	0	6	6	—	3–1	3–0
2	Bayram Özdemir (TUR)	2	1	1	4	10	1–3 PP	—	9–0
3	Anders Nyblom (DEN)	2	0	2	0	0	0–3 PO	0–3 PO	—

Source: Official website

==== Pool 2 ====
Pos	Athlete	Pld	W	L	CP	TP	IND	GEO	UKR
1	Mukesh Khatri (IND)	2	2	0	8	8	—	5–2 Fall	3–5 Fall
2	Vaja Omanidze (GEO)	2	1	1	3	5	0–4 TO	—	3–0
3	Serhiy Sobakar (UKR)	2	0	2	0	5	0–4 TO	0–3 PO	—

Source: Official website

==== Pool 3 ====
Pos	Athlete	Pld	W	L	CP	TP	CUB	ARM	ROM
1	Lázaro Rivas (CUB)	2	2	0	7	15	—	4–3	12–0
2	Artashes Minasyan (ARM)	2	1	1	4	14	1–3 PP	—	11–7
3	Florin Gavrilă (ROM)	2	0	2	1	7	0–4 ST	1–3 PP	—

Source: Official website

==== Pool 4 ====
Pos	Athlete	Pld	W	L	CP	TP	BUL	RUS	AUS
1	Tenyo Tenev (BUL)	2	2	0	6	8	—	5–0	3–0
2	Aleksey Shevtsov (RUS)	2	1	1	4	10	0–3 PO	—	10–0 Fall
3	Nikolay Goranov (AUS)	2	0	2	0	0	0–3 PO	0–4 TO	—

Source: Official website

==== Pool 5 ====
Pos	Athlete	Pld	W	L	CP	TP	IRI	CHN	CZE
1	Hassan Rangraz (IRI)	2	2	0	8	21	—	11–0	10–0
2	Chen Yungang (CHN)	2	1	1	3	6	0–4 ST	—	6–2
3	Jan Hocko (CZE)	2	0	2	1	2	0–4 ST	1–3 PP	—

Source: Official website

==== Pool 6 ====
Pos	Athlete	Pld	W	L	CP	TP	BLR	FIN	HUN
1	Barys Radkevich (BLR)	2	2	0	7	21	—	14–2	7–0
2	Tero Katajisto (FIN)	2	1	1	4	6	1–4 SP	—	4–1
3	Tibor Oláh (HUN)	2	0	2	1	1	0–3 PO	1–3 PP	—

Source: Official website

==== Pool 7 ====
Pos	Athlete	Pld	W	L	CP	TP	KGZ	FRA	KOR
1	Uran Kalilov (KGZ)	2	1	1	4	8	—	7–1	1–3
2	Hamou Oubrick (FRA)	2	1	1	4	8	1–3 PP	—	7–4
3	Ha Tae-yeon (KOR)	2	1	1	4	7	3–1 PP	1–3 PP	—

Source: Official website

==== Pool 8 ====
Pos	Athlete	Pld	W	L	CP	TP	KAZ	GER	AZE
1	Rakymzhan Assembekov (KAZ)	2	2	0	7	3	—	3–2	WO
2	Oleg Kutscherenko (GER)	2	1	1	5	13	1–3 PP	—	11–0
3	Natig Eyvazov (AZE)	2	0	2	0	0	0–4 PA	0–4 ST	—

Source: Official website

==== Pool 9 ====
Pos	Athlete	Pld	W	L	CP	TP	USA	POL	MDA
1	Brandon Paulson (USA)	2	2	0	6	17	—	11–2	6–1
2	Dariusz Jabłoński (POL)	2	1	1	4	10	1–3 PP	—	8–0
3	Vitalie Ceban (MDA)	2	0	2	1	1	1–3 PP	0–3 PO	—

Source: Official website

=== Knockout round ===
Round of 16
Tomoya Murata (JPN)	1
Mukesh Khatri (IND)	7

Quarterfinals
Mukesh Khatri (IND)	3
Lázaro Rivas (CUB)	4
Tenyo Tenev (BUL)	0
Hassan Rangraz (IRI)	13
Barys Radkevich (BLR)	2
Uran Kalilov (KGZ)	3
Rakymzhan Assembekov (KAZ)	0
Brandon Paulson (USA)	3

Semifinals
Lázaro Rivas (CUB)	3
Hassan Rangraz (IRI)	6
Uran Kalilov (KGZ)	1
Brandon Paulson (USA)	1

Final
Hassan Rangraz (IRI)	8
Brandon Paulson (USA)	4
Bronze medal match
Lázaro Rivas (CUB)	3
Uran Kalilov (KGZ)	1
