= Wrestling at the 2002 Asian Games – Men's Greco-Roman 55 kg =

Men's Greco-Roman 55 kg at the 2002 Asian Games
- Venue: Yangsan Gymnasium
- Date: 2–3 October 2002
- Competitors: 11 from 11 nations

Medalists
gold medal	Asset Imanbayev	Kazakhstan
silver medal	Kang Yong-gyun	North Korea
bronze medal	Uran Kalilov	Kyrgyzstan

The men's Greco-Roman 55 kilograms wrestling competition at the 2002 Asian Games in Busan was held on 2 October and 3 October at the Yangsan Gymnasium.

The competition held with an elimination system of three or four wrestlers in each pool, with the winners qualify for the semifinals and final by way of direct elimination.

== Schedule ==
All times are Korea Standard Time (UTC+09:00)

Date	Time	Event
Wednesday, 2 October 2002	10:00	Round 1
Wednesday, 2 October 2002	16:00	Round 2
Wednesday, 2 October 2002	16:00	Round 3
Wednesday, 2 October 2002	16:00	Repechage 1
Wednesday, 2 October 2002	16:00	Repechage 2
Thursday, 3 October 2002	10:00	Repechage 3
Thursday, 3 October 2002	10:00	1/2 finals
Thursday, 3 October 2002	16:00	Finals

== Results ==
=== Preliminary ===
==== Pool 1 ====
Pos	Athlete	Pld	W	L	CP	TP	Qualification
1	Kang Yong-gyun (PRK)	2	2	0	7	16	Knockout round
2	Mukesh Khatri (IND)	2	1	1	3	6	Repechage
3	Hamid Banitamim (IRI)	2	0	2	1	5	

Source: Report

	Score		CP
Kang Yong-gyun (PRK)	10–0	Mukesh Khatri (IND)	4–0 ST
Hamid Banitamim (IRI)	0–6	Kang Yong-gyun (PRK)	0–3 PO
Mukesh Khatri (IND)	6–5	Hamid Banitamim (IRI)	3–1 PP

==== Pool 2 ====
Pos	Athlete	Pld	W	L	CP	TP	Qualification
1	Wang Hui (CHN)	3	3	0	10	19	Knockout round
2	Jung Ji-hyun (KOR)	3	2	1	8	16	Repechage
3	Kamol Kholmatov (UZB)	3	1	2	5	13	
4	Dhaher Ahmed (QAT)	3	0	3	0	0	

Source: Report

	Score		CP
Wang Hui (CHN)	10–0 Fall	Dhaher Ahmed (QAT)	4–0 ST
Kamol Kholmatov (UZB)	0–3	Jung Ji-hyun (KOR)	0–3 PO
Wang Hui (CHN)	5–1	Kamol Kholmatov (UZB)	3–1 PP
Dhaher Ahmed (QAT)	0–10	Jung Ji-hyun (KOR)	0–4 ST
Wang Hui (CHN)	4–3	Jung Ji-hyun (KOR)	3–1 PP
Dhaher Ahmed (QAT)	0–12	Kamol Kholmatov (UZB)	0–4 ST

==== Pool 3 ====
Pos	Athlete	Pld	W	L	CP	TP	Qualification
1	Uran Kalilov (KGZ)	3	3	0	10	21	Knockout round
2	Asset Imanbayev (KAZ)	3	2	1	8	21	Repechage
3	Tomoya Murata (JPN)	3	1	2	5	15	
4	Nguyễn Thế Hải (VIE)	3	0	3	0	0	

Source: Report

	Score		CP
Asset Imanbayev (KAZ)	0–3	Uran Kalilov (KGZ)	0–3 PO
Nguyễn Thế Hải (VIE)	0–13 Fall	Tomoya Murata (JPN)	0–4 TO
Asset Imanbayev (KAZ)	10–0	Nguyễn Thế Hải (VIE)	4–0 ST
Uran Kalilov (KGZ)	3–2	Tomoya Murata (JPN)	3–1 PP
Asset Imanbayev (KAZ)	11–0	Tomoya Murata (JPN)	4–0 ST
Uran Kalilov (KGZ)	15–0	Nguyễn Thế Hải (VIE)	4–0 ST

=== Repechage ===
Pos	Athlete	Pld	W	L	CP	TP	Qualification
1	Asset Imanbayev (KAZ)	2	2	0	6	12	Knockout round
2	Mukesh Khatri (IND)	2	1	1	4	4	
3	Jung Ji-hyun (KOR)	2	0	2	1	2	

Source: Report

	Score		CP
Mukesh Khatri (IND)	3–0	Jung Ji-hyun (KOR)	3–0 PO
Asset Imanbayev (KAZ)	6–1	Mukesh Khatri (IND)	3–1 PP
Jung Ji-hyun (KOR)	2–6	Asset Imanbayev (KAZ)	1–3 PP

=== Knockout round ===
1/2 finals
Kang Yong-gyun (PRK)	13
Uran Kalilov (KGZ)	0
Wang Hui (CHN)	4
Asset Imanbayev (KAZ)	8

Final
Kang Yong-gyun (PRK)	1
Asset Imanbayev (KAZ)	6
3rd–4th place
Uran Kalilov (KGZ)	6
Wang Hui (CHN)	5

== Final standing ==
Rank	Athlete
1st place, gold medalist(s)	Asset Imanbayev (KAZ)
2nd place, silver medalist(s)	Kang Yong-gyun (PRK)
3rd place, bronze medalist(s)	Uran Kalilov (KGZ)
4	Wang Hui (CHN)
5	Mukesh Khatri (IND)
6	Jung Ji-hyun (KOR)
7	Tomoya Murata (JPN)
8	Kamol Kholmatov (UZB)
9	Hamid Banitamim (IRI)
10	Nguyễn Thế Hải (VIE)
11	Dhaher Ahmed (QAT)
