= Wrestling at the 2004 Summer Olympics – Men's Greco-Roman 55 kg =

Men's Greco-Roman 55 kg at the Games of the XXVIII Olympiad
- Venue: Ano Liosia Olympic Hall
- Date: 24–25 August 2004
- Competitors: 22 from 22 nations

Medalists
1st place, gold medalist(s)		István Majoros	Hungary
2nd place, silver medalist(s)		Geidar Mamedaliyev	Russia
3rd place, bronze medalist(s)		Artiom Kiouregkian	Greece

The men's Greco-Roman 55 kilograms at the 2004 Summer Olympics as part of the wrestling program were held at the Ano Liosia Olympic Hall, August 24 to August 25. The competition held with an elimination system of three or four wrestlers in each pool, with the winners qualify for the quarterfinals, semifinals and final by way of direct elimination.

== Schedule ==
All times are Eastern European Summer Time (UTC+03:00)

Date	Time	Event
24 August 2004	09:30	Round 1
24 August 2004	09:30	Round 2
24 August 2004	17:30	Round 3
24 August 2004	17:30	Qualification
25 August 2004	09:30	Semifinals
25 August 2004	17:30	Finals

== Results ==
=== Elimination pools ===
==== Pool 1 ====
Pos	Athlete	Pld	W	L	CP	TP	Qualification
1	István Majoros (HUN)	2	2	0	6	10	Knockout round
2	Masatoshi Toyota (JPN)	2	1	1	5	14	
3	Jansel Ramírez (DOM)	2	0	2	0	0	

Source: Official website

	Score		CP
Masatoshi Toyota (JPN)	3–5	István Majoros (HUN)	1–3 PP
Jansel Ramírez (DOM)	0–11	Masatoshi Toyota (JPN)	0–4 ST
István Majoros (HUN)	5–0	Jansel Ramírez (DOM)	3–0 PO

==== Pool 2 ====
Pos	Athlete	Pld	W	L	CP	TP	Qualification
1	Lázaro Rivas (CUB)	2	2	0	7	17	Knockout round
2	Hassan Rangraz (IRI)	2	1	1	5	14	
3	Samir Benchenaf (ALG)	2	0	2	0	0	

Source: Official website

	Score		CP
Lázaro Rivas (CUB)	11–0	Samir Benchenaf (ALG)	4–0 ST
Hassan Rangraz (IRI)	4–6	Lázaro Rivas (CUB)	1–3 PP
Samir Benchenaf (ALG)	0–10	Hassan Rangraz (IRI)	0–4 ST

==== Pool 3 ====
Pos	Athlete	Pld	W	L	CP	TP	Qualification
1	Irakli Chochua (GEO)	2	2	0	6	7	Knockout round
2	Ercan Yıldız (TUR)	2	1	1	4	4	
3	Svajūnas Adomaitis (LTU)	2	0	2	2	2	

Source: Official website

	Score		CP
Irakli Chochua (GEO)	4–1	Ercan Yıldız (TUR)	3–1 PP
Svajūnas Adomaitis (LTU)	1–3	Irakli Chochua (GEO)	1–3 PP
Ercan Yıldız (TUR)	3–1	Svajūnas Adomaitis (LTU)	3–1 PP

==== Pool 4 ====
Pos	Athlete	Pld	W	L	CP	TP	Qualification
1	Oleksiy Vakulenko (UKR)	2	2	0	6	7	Knockout round
2	Dennis Hall (USA)	2	1	1	3	3	
3	Petr Švehla (CZE)	2	0	2	1	2	

Source: Official website

	Score		CP
Petr Švehla (CZE)	2–3	Dennis Hall (USA)	1–3 PP
Oleksiy Vakulenko (UKR)	4–0	Petr Švehla (CZE)	3–0 PO
Dennis Hall (USA)	0–3	Oleksiy Vakulenko (UKR)	0–3 PO

==== Pool 5 ====
Pos	Athlete	Pld	W	L	CP	TP	Qualification
1	Im Dae-won (KOR)	2	2	0	6	10	Knockout round
2	Marian Sandu (ROM)	2	1	1	4	9	
3	Nurbakyt Tengizbayev (KAZ)	2	0	2	1	4	

Source: Official website

	Score		CP
Im Dae-won (KOR)	4–4	Nurbakyt Tengizbayev (KAZ)	3–1 PP
Marian Sandu (ROM)	3–6	Im Dae-won (KOR)	1–3 PP
Nurbakyt Tengizbayev (KAZ)	0–6	Marian Sandu (ROM)	0–3 PO

==== Pool 6 ====
Pos	Athlete	Pld	W	L	CP	TP	Qualification
1	Geidar Mamedaliyev (RUS)	2	2	0	6	6	Knockout round
2	Dariusz Jabłoński (POL)	2	1	1	3	3	
3	Mukesh Khatri (IND)	2	0	2	0	0	

Source: Official website

	Score		CP
Geidar Mamedaliyev (RUS)	3–0	Mukesh Khatri (IND)	3–0 PO
Dariusz Jabłoński (POL)	0–3	Geidar Mamedaliyev (RUS)	0–3 PO
Mukesh Khatri (IND)	0–3	Dariusz Jabłoński (POL)	0–3 PO

==== Pool 7 ====
Pos	Athlete	Pld	W	L	CP	TP	Qualification
1	Artiom Kiouregkian (GRE)	3	3	0	10	17	Knockout round
2	Håkan Nyblom (DEN)	3	2	1	6	5	
3	Sheng Jiang (CHN)	3	1	2	4	4	
4	Uran Kalilov (KGZ)	3	0	3	1	3	

Source: Official website

	Score		CP
Håkan Nyblom (DEN)	0–3	Artiom Kiouregkian (GRE)	0–3 PO
Sheng Jiang (CHN)	3–3	Uran Kalilov (KGZ)	3–1 PP
Håkan Nyblom (DEN)	2–1	Sheng Jiang (CHN)	3–1 PP
Artiom Kiouregkian (GRE)	6–0 Fall	Uran Kalilov (KGZ)	4–0 TO
Håkan Nyblom (DEN)	3–0	Uran Kalilov (KGZ)	3–0 PO
Artiom Kiouregkian (GRE)	8–0	Sheng Jiang (CHN)	3–0 PO

=== Knockout round ===
Qualification
István Majoros (HUN)	6
Lázaro Rivas (CUB)	1
Irakli Chochua (GEO)	12
Oleksiy Vakulenko (UKR)	14
Im Dae-won (KOR)	0
Geidar Mamedaliyev (RUS)	3

Semifinals
István Majoros (HUN)	3
Oleksiy Vakulenko (UKR)	1
Geidar Mamedaliyev (RUS)	7
Artiom Kiouregkian (GRE)	2

Gold medal match
István Majoros (HUN)	3
Geidar Mamedaliyev (RUS)	1
Bronze medal match
Oleksiy Vakulenko (UKR)	1
Artiom Kiouregkian (GRE)	6

Classification 5–6
Lázaro Rivas (CUB)	11
Irakli Chochua (GEO)	0

== Final standing ==
Rank	Athlete
1st place, gold medalist(s)	István Majoros (HUN)
2nd place, silver medalist(s)	Geidar Mamedaliyev (RUS)
3rd place, bronze medalist(s)	Artiom Kiouregkian (GRE)
4	Oleksiy Vakulenko (UKR)
5	Lázaro Rivas (CUB)
6	Irakli Chochua (GEO)
7	Im Dae-won (KOR)
8	Håkan Nyblom (DEN)
9	Hassan Rangraz (IRI)
10	Masatoshi Toyota (JPN)
11	Marian Sandu (ROM)
12	Ercan Yıldız (TUR)
13	Sheng Jiang (CHN)
14	Dennis Hall (USA)
15	Dariusz Jabłoński (POL)
16	Svajūnas Adomaitis (LTU)
17	Nurbakyt Tengizbayev (KAZ)
18	Uran Kalilov (KGZ)
19	Petr Švehla (CZE)
20	Samir Benchenaf (ALG)
21	Mukesh Khatri (IND)
22	Jansel Ramírez (DOM)
