= 2001 European Wrestling Championships =

- Host city: Istanbul, Turkey Greco-Roman; Budapest, Hungary Freestyle
- Dates: 11–12 May 2001; 19–22 April 2001

Champions
- Freestyle: Russia
- Greco-Roman: Turkey
- Women: Russia

The 2001 European Wrestling Championships were held in the Greco-Romane in Istanbul and the men's Freestyle style, and the women's freestyle in Budapest.

== Medal table ==
Rank	Nation	Gold	Silver	Bronze	Total
1	Russia	7	8	0	15
2	Turkey	3	2	1	6
3	Georgia	2	2	1	5
4	Poland	2	1	2	5
5	Hungary	2	0	1	3
6	Ukraine	1	3	1	5
7	Bulgaria	1	2	3	6
8	Greece	1	1	1	3
9	Belarus	1	0	4	5
10	Czech Republic	1	0	0	1
10	Moldova	1	0	0	1
12	Sweden	0	2	0	2
13	France	0	1	0	1
14	Germany	0	0	3	3
15	Armenia	0	0	2	2
15	Romania	0	0	2	2
17	Norway	0	0	1	1
Totals (17 entries)		22	22	22	66

== Medal summary ==
=== Men's freestyle ===
Event	Gold	Silver	Bronze
54 kg	Ghenadie Tulbea; Moldova	Amiran Kardanov; Greece	Armen Mkrtchyan; Armenia
58 kg	Zsolt Bánkuti; Hungary	Vasyl Fedoryshyn; Ukraine	Aliaxandr Karnitski; Belarus
63 kg	Serafim Barzakov; Bulgaria	Soslan Tomayev; Russia	Otar Tushishvili; Georgia
69 kg	Ahmet Gülhan; Turkey	Irbek Farniyev; Russia	Nikolay Paslar; Bulgaria
76 kg	Buvaisar Saitiev; Russia	Miroslav Gochev; Bulgaria	Árpád Ritter; Hungary
85 kg	Sazhid Sazhidov; Russia	Davyd Bichinashvili; Ukraine	Beibulat Musaev; Belarus
97 kg	Eldar Kurtanidze; Georgia	Giorgi Gogshelidze; Russia	Aleksandr Shemarov; Belarus
130 kg	David Musulbes; Russia	Alex Modebadze; Georgia	Sven Thiele; Germany

=== Men's Greco-Roman ===
Event	Gold	Silver	Bronze
54 kg	Boris Radkevich; Belarus	Ercan Yıldız; Turkey	Dariusz Jabłoński; Poland
58 kg	Petr Švehla; Czech Republic	Irakli Chochua; Georgia	Marian Sandu; Romania
63 kg	Şeref Eroğlu; Turkey	Temur Tejumov; Russia	Włodzimierz Zawadzki; Poland
69 kg	Aleksandr Dokturishvili; Georgia	Mihail Ivanchenko; Russia	Movses Karapetyan; Armenia
76 kg	Aleksey Mishin; Russia	Ara Abrahamian; Sweden	Nazmi Avluca; Turkey
85 kg	Hamza Yerlikaya; Turkey	Marcin Letki; Poland	Oleksandr Daragan; Ukraine
97 kg	Alexandr Bezruchkin; Russia	Ali Mollov; Bulgaria	Petru Sudureac; Romania
130 kg	Mihály Deák-Bárdos; Hungary	Fatih Bakir; Turkey	Sergei Mureiko; Bulgaria

=== Women's freestyle ===
Event	Gold	Silver	Bronze
46 kg	Inga Karamchakova; Russia	Iryna Merleni; Ukraine	Kamelia Tsekova; Bulgaria
51 kg	Sofia Poumpouridou; Greece	Natalia Gushina; Russia	Alena Kareicha; Belarus
56 kg	Tetyana Lazareva; Ukraine	Ida-Theres Karlsson-Nerell; Sweden	Konstantina Tsibanaku; Greece
62 kg	Małgorzata Bassa-Roguska; Poland	Natalia Ivanova; Russia	Lene Aanes; Norway
68 kg	Natalia Gavrilova; Russia	Lise Legrand; France	Anita Schätzle; Germany
75 kg	Edyta Witkowska; Poland	Svetlana Martinenko; Russia	Nina Englich; Germany
