= Wrestling at the 1998 Asian Games – Men's Greco-Roman 54 kg =

Men's Greco-Roman 54 kg at the 1998 Asian Games
- Venue: Thammasat Gymnasium 1
- Dates: 12–13 December 1998
- Competitors: 15 from 15 nations

Medalists
gold medal	Sim Kwon-ho	South Korea
silver medal	Kang Yong-gyun	North Korea
bronze medal	Wang Hui	China

The men's Greco-Roman 54 kilograms wrestling competition at the 1998 Asian Games in Bangkok was held on 12 December and 13 December at the Thammasat Gymnasium 1.

The gold and silver medalists were determined by the final match of the main single-elimination bracket. The losers advanced to the repechage. These matches determined the bronze medalist for the event.

== Schedule ==
All times are Indochina Time (UTC+07:00)

Date	Time	Event
Saturday, 12 December 1998	09:00	Round 1
Saturday, 12 December 1998	16:00	Round 2
Saturday, 12 December 1998	16:00	Round 3
Sunday, 13 December 1998	09:00	Round 4
Sunday, 13 December 1998	09:00	Round 5
Sunday, 13 December 1998	16:00	Finals

== Results ==
Legend

- WO — Won by walkover

=== Round 1 ===
	Score		CP
1/8 finals
Ali Ashkani (IRI)	10–0	Thanet Suwanna (THA)	4–0 ST
Uran Kalilov (KGZ)	0–3	Kang Yong-gyun (PRK)	0–3 PO
Dilshod Aripov (UZB)	7–6	Masatsune Sasaki (JPN)	3–1 PP
Renerio Rapisora (PHI)	0–12	Sim Kwon-ho (KOR)	0–4 ST
Nepes Gukulow (TKM)	12–0	Abdullah Al-Izani (YEM)	4–0 ST
Kaka Pawar (IND)	11–0	Nguyễn Như Thịnh (VIE)	4–0 ST
Nurym Dyusenov (KAZ)	0–6	Khaled Al-Faraj (SYR)	0–3 PO
Wang Hui (CHN)		Bye	

=== Round 2 ===
	Score		CP
Quarterfinals
Wang Hui (CHN)	9–4	Ali Ashkani (IRI)	3–1 PP
Kang Yong-gyun (PRK)	5–0	Dilshod Aripov (UZB)	3–0 PO
Sim Kwon-ho (KOR)	8–6	Nepes Gukulow (TKM)	3–1 PP
Kaka Pawar (IND)	0–12	Khaled Al-Faraj (SYR)	0–4 ST
Repechage
Thanet Suwanna (THA)	0–12	Uran Kalilov (KGZ)	0–4 ST
Masatsune Sasaki (JPN)	11–0	Renerio Rapisora (PHI)	4–0 ST
Abdullah Al-Izani (YEM)	16–5	Nguyễn Như Thịnh (VIE)	4–1 SP
Nurym Dyusenov (KAZ)		Bye	

=== Round 3 ===
	Score		CP
Semifinals
Wang Hui (CHN)	4–12	Kang Yong-gyun (PRK)	1–3 PP
Sim Kwon-ho (KOR)	6–3	Khaled Al-Faraj (SYR)	3–1 PP
Repechage
Nurym Dyusenov (KAZ)	1–8	Uran Kalilov (KGZ)	1–3 PP
Masatsune Sasaki (JPN)	11–1	Abdullah Al-Izani (YEM)	4–1 SP
Ali Ashkani (IRI)	2–3	Dilshod Aripov (UZB)	1–3 PP
Nepes Gukulow (TKM)	12–2	Kaka Pawar (IND)	4–1 SP

=== Round 4 ===
	Score		CP
Repechage
Uran Kalilov (KGZ)	WO	Masatsune Sasaki (JPN)	0–4 EF
Dilshod Aripov (UZB)	4–1	Nepes Gukulow (TKM)	3–1 PP

=== Round 5 ===
	Score		CP
Repechage
Wang Hui (CHN)	5–0	Masatsune Sasaki (JPN)	3–0 PO
Dilshod Aripov (UZB)	6–4	Khaled Al-Faraj (SYR)	3–1 PP

=== Finals ===
	Score		CP
Bronze medal match
Wang Hui (CHN)	7–0 Fall	Dilshod Aripov (UZB)	4–0 TO
Gold medal match
Kang Yong-gyun (PRK)	5–5	Sim Kwon-ho (KOR)	1–3 PP

== Final standing ==
Rank	Athlete
1st place, gold medalist(s)	Sim Kwon-ho (KOR)
2nd place, silver medalist(s)	Kang Yong-gyun (PRK)
3rd place, bronze medalist(s)	Wang Hui (CHN)
4	Dilshod Aripov (UZB)
5	Masatsune Sasaki (JPN)
6	Khaled Al-Faraj (SYR)
7	Nepes Gukulow (TKM)
8	Ali Ashkani (IRI)
9	Abdullah Al-Izani (YEM)
10	Kaka Pawar (IND)
11	Nurym Dyusenov (KAZ)
12	Nguyễn Như Thịnh (VIE)
13	Renerio Rapisora (PHI)
13	Thanet Suwanna (THA)
—	Uran Kalilov (KGZ)
