= 2003 World Wrestling Championships – Women's freestyle 48 kg =

Women's freestyle 48 kg at the 2003 World Championships
- Venue: Madison Square Garden
- Dates: 12–14 September 2003
- Competitors: 29 from 29 nations

Medalists
| gold medal | Iryna Merleni | Ukraine |
| silver medal | Patricia Miranda | United States |
| bronze medal | Li Hui | China |

The women's freestyle 48 kilograms is a competition featured at the 2003 World Wrestling Championships, and was held at the Madison Square Garden in New York, United States from 12 to 14 September 2003.

== Results ==
Legend

- F — Won by fall

=== Preliminary round ===
==== Pool 1 ====
| Pos | Athlete | Pld | W | L | CP | TP | FRA | POL | PER |
|---|---|---|---|---|---|---|---|---|---|
| 1 | Angélique Berthenet (FRA) | 2 | 2 | 0 | 6 | 9 | — | 5–2 | 4–2 |
| 2 | Iwona Sadowska (POL) | 2 | 1 | 1 | 4 | 5 | 1–3 PP | — | 3–0 |
| 3 | Flor Quispe (PER) | 2 | 0 | 2 | 1 | 2 | 1–3 PP | 0–3 PO | — |

Source: Official website

==== Pool 2 ====
| Pos | Athlete | Pld | W | L | CP | TP | BUL | KOR | GER |
|---|---|---|---|---|---|---|---|---|---|
| 1 | Kamelia Tzekova (BUL) | 2 | 2 | 0 | 7 | 12 | — | 8–6 | 4–0 Fall |
| 2 | Park Ji-young (KOR) | 2 | 1 | 1 | 4 | 9 | 1–3 PP | — | 3–1 |
| 3 | Sigrun Dobner (GER) | 2 | 0 | 2 | 1 | 1 | 0–4 TO | 1–3 PP | — |

Source: Official website

==== Pool 3 ====
| Pos | Athlete | Pld | W | L | CP | TP | USA | CAN | ESP |
|---|---|---|---|---|---|---|---|---|---|
| 1 | Patricia Miranda (USA) | 2 | 2 | 0 | 7 | 14 | — | 3–1 | 11–0 |
| 2 | Lyndsay Belisle (CAN) | 2 | 1 | 1 | 5 | 8 | 1–3 PP | — | 7–0 Fall |
| 3 | María del Mar Peralta (ESP) | 2 | 0 | 2 | 0 | 0 | 0–4 ST | 0–4 TO | — |

Source: Official website

==== Pool 4 ====
| Pos | Athlete | Pld | W | L | CP | TP | GRE | IND | AUS |
|---|---|---|---|---|---|---|---|---|---|
| 1 | Fani Psatha (GRE) | 2 | 2 | 0 | 6 | 12 | — | 8–5 | 4–3 |
| 2 | Kamini Yadav (IND) | 2 | 1 | 1 | 4 | 8 | 1–3 PP | — | 3–1 |
| 3 | Lila Ristevska (AUS) | 2 | 0 | 2 | 2 | 4 | 1–3 PP | 1–3 PP | — |

Source: Official website

==== Pool 5 ====
| Pos | Athlete | Pld | W | L | CP | TP | KGZ | TPE | KAZ |
|---|---|---|---|---|---|---|---|---|---|
| 1 | Alfia Zaynulina (KGZ) | 2 | 2 | 0 | 6 | 8 | — | 4–2 | 4–2 |
| 2 | Wang Ying-chi (TPE) | 2 | 1 | 1 | 4 | 11 | 1–3 PP | — | 9–0 |
| 3 | Zhanar Amangaliyeva (KAZ) | 2 | 0 | 2 | 1 | 2 | 1–3 PP | 0–3 PO | — |

Source: Official website

==== Pool 6 ====
| Pos | Athlete | Pld | W | L | CP | TP | RUS | NOR | SWE |
|---|---|---|---|---|---|---|---|---|---|
| 1 | Inga Karamchakova (RUS) | 2 | 2 | 0 | 6 | 8 | — | 5–3 | 3–2 |
| 2 | Gudrun Høie (NOR) | 2 | 1 | 1 | 5 | 3 | 1–3 PP | — | WO |
| 3 | Ida Hellström (SWE) | 2 | 0 | 2 | 1 | 2 | 1–3 PP | 0–4 PA | — |

Source: Official website

==== Pool 7 ====
| Pos | Athlete | Pld | W | L | CP | TP | CHN | ITA | BRA |
|---|---|---|---|---|---|---|---|---|---|
| 1 | Li Hui (CHN) | 2 | 2 | 0 | 8 | 20 | — | 13–3 | 7–2 Fall |
| 2 | Francine De Paola (ITA) | 2 | 1 | 1 | 5 | 13 | 1–4 SP | — | 10–0 |
| 3 | Susana Santos (BRA) | 2 | 0 | 2 | 0 | 2 | 0–4 TO | 0–4 ST | — |

Source: Official website

==== Pool 8 ====
| Pos | Athlete | Pld | W | L | CP | TP | JPN | VEN | TJK | ROM |
|---|---|---|---|---|---|---|---|---|---|---|
| 1 | Makiko Sakamoto (JPN) | 3 | 3 | 0 | 9 | 14 | — | 3–0 | 6–5 | 5–0 |
| 2 | Mayelis Caripá (VEN) | 3 | 2 | 1 | 7 | 16 | 0–3 PO | — | 5–1 | 11–3 Fall |
| 3 | Lidiya Karamchakova (TJK) | 3 | 1 | 2 | 5 | 9 | 1–3 PP | 1–3 PP | — | 3–2 |
| 4 | Nicoleta Badea (ROM) | 3 | 0 | 3 | 1 | 5 | 0–3 PO | 0–4 TO | 1–3 PP | — |

Source: Official website

==== Pool 9 ====
| Pos | Athlete | Pld | W | L | CP | TP | UKR | TUR | PUR | SUI |
|---|---|---|---|---|---|---|---|---|---|---|
| 1 | Iryna Merleni (UKR) | 3 | 3 | 0 | 12 | 26 | — | 11–0 | 7–0 Fall | 8–0 Fall |
| 2 | Nadir Uğrun Perçin (TUR) | 3 | 2 | 1 | 6 | 10 | 0–4 ST | — | 4–0 | 6–3 |
| 3 | Livanis Rivera (PUR) | 3 | 1 | 2 | 3 | 4 | 0–4 TO | 0–3 PO | — | 4–3 |
| 4 | Karin Wild (SUI) | 3 | 0 | 3 | 2 | 6 | 0–4 TO | 1–3 PP | 1–3 PP | — |

Source: Official website

=== Knockout round ===
Round of 16
Angélique Berthenet (FRA) | 5^{F}
Kamelia Tzekova (BUL) | 2

Quarterfinals
Angélique Berthenet (FRA) | 1
Patricia Miranda (USA) | 11
Fani Psatha (GRE) | 5
Alfia Zaynulina (KGZ) | 1
Inga Karamchakova (RUS) | 0
Li Hui (CHN) | 3^{F}
Makiko Sakamoto (JPN) | 2
Iryna Merleni (UKR) | 5

Semifinals
Patricia Miranda (USA) | 7^{F}
Fani Psatha (GRE) | 0
Li Hui (CHN) | 1
Iryna Merleni (UKR) | 6

Final
Patricia Miranda (USA) | 4
Iryna Merleni (UKR) | 5
Bronze medal match
Fani Psatha (GRE) | 3
Li Hui (CHN) | 15^{F}
