= 2004 European Wrestling Championships =

- Host city: Haparanda, Sweden Greco-Roman; Ankara, Turkey Freestyle
- Dates: 8 – 11 April 2004; 23 – 25 April 2004

Champions
- Freestyle: Russia
- Greco-Roman: Ukraine
- Women: Ukraine

The 2004 European Wrestling Championships were held in the men's freestyle in Ankara and men's Greco-Roman style, and the women's freestyle in Haparanda.

== Medal table ==
Rank	Nation	Gold	Silver	Bronze	Total
1	Russia	7	3	3	13
2	Turkey	5	0	1	6
3	Ukraine	4	6	2	12
4	Sweden	3	1	1	5
5	Armenia	2	0	0	2
6	Belarus	0	3	2	5
7	Greece	0	2	3	5
8	Germany	0	2	0	2
9	France	0	1	0	1
9	Georgia	0	1	0	1
9	Italy	0	1	0	1
9	Serbia and Montenegro	0	1	0	1
13	Bulgaria	0	0	2	2
13	Czech Republic	0	0	2	2
15	Azerbaijan	0	0	1	1
15	Finland	0	0	1	1
15	Hungary	0	0	1	1
15	Israel	0	0	1	1
15	Poland	0	0	1	1
Totals (19 entries)		21	21	21	63

== Medal summary ==
=== Men's freestyle ===
Event	Gold	Silver	Bronze
55 kg	Martin Berberyan; Armenia	Adam Batirov; Russia	Ivan Djorev; Bulgaria
60 kg	Tevfik Odabaşı; Turkey	Alan Dudayev; Russia	Vasyl Fedoryshyn; Ukraine
66 kg	Makhach Murtazaliev; Russia	Elbrus Tedeyev; Ukraine	Ömer Çubukçu; Turkey
74 kg	Ruslan Kokayev; Russia	Murad Gaidarov; Belarus	Emzarios Bentinidis; Greece
84 kg	Gökhan Yavaşer; Turkey	Revaz Mindorashvili; Georgia	RLázaros Loizidis; Greece
96 kg	Khadzhimurat Gatsalov; Russia	Vadym Tasoyev; Ukraine	Rustam Aghayev; Azerbaijan
120 kg	Aydın Polatçı; Turkey	Kuramagomed Kuramagomedov; Russia	Serhii Priadun; Ukraine

=== Men's Greco-Roman ===
Event	Gold	Silver	Bronze
55 kg	Bayram Özdemir; Turkey	Artiom Kiouregkian; Greece	Petr Švehla; Czech Republic
60 kg	Vahan Juharyan; Armenia	Davor Štefanek; Serbia and Montenegro	Ivan Alexandrov; Israel
66 kg	Armen Vardanyan; Ukraine	Vitaly Zhuk; Belarus	Ari-Pekka Härkänen; Finland
74 kg	Mikhail Ivanchenko; Russia	Vasyl Rachyba; Ukraine	Aleh Mikhalovich; Belarus
84 kg	Nazmi Avluca; Turkey	Dimitrios Avramis; Greece	Sándor Bárdosi; Hungary
96 kg	Martin Lidberg; Sweden	Sergey Lishtvan; Belarus	Marek Švec; Czech Republic
120 kg	Yury Patrikeyev; Russia	Kostiantyn Stryzhak; Ukraine	Sergei Mureiko; Bulgaria

=== Women's freestyle ===
Event	Gold	Silver	Bronze
48 kg	Iryna Merleni; Ukraine	Brigitte Wagner; Germany	Myrsini Koloni; Greece
51 kg	Inesa Rebar; Ukraine	Ida-Theres Karlsson-Nerell; Sweden	Alena Kareicha; Belarus
55 kg	Ida Hellström; Sweden	Tetyana Lazareva; Ukraine	Natalia Karamchakova; Russia
59 kg	Helena Allandi; Sweden	Sabrina Esposito; Italy	Lubov Volosova; Russia
63 kg	Alena Kartashova; Russia	Stéphanie Groß; Germany	Sara Eriksson; Sweden
67 kg	Kateryna Burmistrova; Ukraine	Lise Legrand; France	Svetlana Martinenko; Russia
72 kg	Guzel Manyurova; Russia	Svetlana Saenko; Ukraine	Anna Wawrzycka; Poland
