= Samir Benchenaf =

Algerian Greco-Roman wrestler

Personal information
- Full name: Samir Benchenaf
- Nationality: Algeria
- Born: 7 March 1980 (age 46)
- Height: 1.67 m (5 ft 5 1/2 in)
- Weight: 55 kg (121 lb)

Sport
- Style: Greco-Roman

Samir Benchenaf (Arabic: سمير بن شناف; born March 7, 1980) is a retired amateur Algerian Greco-Roman wrestler, who competed in the men's featherweight category. He qualified as a lone wrestler for the Algerian squad in the men's 55 kg class at the 2004 Summer Olympics in Athens, by receiving a wildcard entry from the International Federation of Associated Wrestling (FILA). He lost two straight matches each to Cuba's Lázaro Rivas (0–11) and Iran's Hassan Rangraz (0–10) due to the ten-point superiority limit, leaving him on the bottom of the pool and finishing twentieth overall in the final standings.
