= Im Dae-won =

South Korean Greco-Roman wrestler

Personal information
- Full name: Im Dae-won
- Nationality: South Korea
- Born: 16 August 1976 (age 49) Imsil, Jeollabuk-do, South Korea
- Height: 1.62 m (5 ft 4 in)
- Weight: 55 kg (121 lb)

Sport
- Style: Greco-Roman
- Club: Samsung Sports
- Coach: Ahn Han-bong
Medal record
Men's Greco-Roman wrestling
Representing South Korea
World Championships
Silver medal – second place	2003 Créteil	55 kg
Asian Championships
Silver medal – second place	2004 Almaty	55 kg
Bronze medal – third place	2003 Delhi	55 kg

Im Dae-won (Korean: 임대원; born August 16, 1976, in Imsil, Jeollabuk-do) is a retired amateur South Korean Greco-Roman wrestler, who competed in the men's featherweight category. He produced a remarkable tally of three career medals, including a silver in the 55-kg division at the 2003 World Wrestling Championships in Créteil, France, and also finished seventh at the 2004 Summer Olympics, representing his nation South Korea. Having worked as a full-time employee for Samsung Sports, Im trained throughout his sporting career as a member of its wrestling team under head coach Ahn Han-bong.

Im highlighted his sporting career at the 2003 World Wrestling Championships in Créteil, France, where he picked up a silver medal in the 55-kg division, losing 5–6 to three-time Olympic veteran Dariusz Jabłoński of Poland. Because of his unprecedented success, Im emerged as one of the top favorites to win a medal for the Olympic Games, and went on to grab another silver at the Asian Championships in Almaty, Kazakhstan by the following year.

At the 2004 Summer Olympics in Athens, Im qualified for the South Korean squad, as a 28-year-old, in the men's 55 kg class. Earlier in the process, he placed second behind Jablonski at the World Championships and guaranteed a spot on South Korea's Olympic wrestling team by obtaining a silver medal from the Asian Championships. He dominated the prelim pool by pulling into a 4–4 tie over Kazakhstan's Nurbakyt Tengizbayev, and dismantling another Olympic veteran Marian Sandu of Romania with a 3–6 verdict to secure him a spot for the next round. As he faced off against eventual Olympic silver medalist Geidar Mamedaliyev of Russia, Im could not hold him tightly to score enough points and lost the match 3–0, placing seventh in the final standings.
