= Nepes Gukulow =

Turkmenistan wrestler (born 1978)

Nepes Gukulov
Personal information
- Born: 10 September 1977 (age 48) Turkmenistan
- Height: 1.65 m (5 ft 5 in)
- Weight: 58 kg (128 lb)

Sport
- Sport: Greco-Roman wrestling
- Club: University Sports Club, Ashgabat
- Coached by: Mihail Chakmazyan
Medal record
Men's Greco-Roman wrestling
Representing Turkmenistan
World Championships
Silver medal – second place	2002 Moscow	-55 kg
Central Asian Games
Bronze medal – third place	1997 Almaty	-54 kg
Central Asian Games
Silver medal – second place	1999 Bishkek	-54 kg
West Asian Games
Bronze medal – third place	1997 Tehran	-54 kg

Nepes Gukulov (born 10 September 1977) is a retired Greco-Roman wrestler from Turkmenistan. He represented his country at the 2000 Summer Olympics in Sydney as a featherweight (-58 kg), finishing 10th overall (with a 1-2 record).

He is also the only Turkmen to ever medal at the World Wrestling Championships, winning a silver in 2002 in Moscow at -55 kg. He defeated defending world champion Hassan Rangraz in the semifinals before losing to Geidar Mamedaliyev in the gold medal match.
