= Svajūnas Adomaitis =

Lithuanian Greco-Roman wrestler (born 1985)

Personal information
- Full name: Svajūnas Adomaitis
- Nationality: Lithuania
- Born: 9 March 1985 (age 41) Tauragė, Lithuanian SSR, Soviet Union
- Height: 1.75 m (5 ft 9 in)
- Weight: 55 kg (121 lb)

Sport
- Style: Greco-Roman
- Club: LOSC Vilnius
- Coach: Jonas Sabutis

Svajūnas Adomaitis (born March 9, 1985, in Tauragė) is a retired amateur Lithuanian Greco-Roman wrestler, who competed in the men's featherweight category. He scored a ninth-place finish in the 55-kg division at the 2003 World Wrestling Championships in Créteil, France, and later represented his nation Lithuania at the 2004 Summer Olympics. Throughout his sporting career, Adomaitis trained as a member of the wrestling squad for the Lithuanian Olympic Sports Center (Lithuanian: Lietuvos olimpinis sporto centras) under head coach Jonas Sabutis.

Adomaitis qualified for the Lithuanian squad in the men's 55 kg class at the 2004 Summer Olympics in Athens. Earlier in the process, he received a berth and rounded out the ninth spot from the 2003 World Wrestling Championships in Créteil, France. He lost two straight matches each to Georgia's Irakli Chochua and two-time Olympian Ercan Yıldız of Turkey, both by a 1–3 verdict, leaving him on the bottom of the prelim pool and placing sixteenth in the final standings.
