= Oleksiy Vakulenko =

Ukrainian Olympic wrestler (born 1981)

Personal information
- Full name: Oleksiy Borysovych Vakulenko
- Nationality: Ukraine
- Born: 28 March 1981 Kramatorsk, Ukrainian SSR, Soviet Union
- Died: 3 March 2007 (aged 25) Kramatorsk, Ukraine
- Height: 1.60 m (5 ft 3 in)
- Weight: 55 kg (121 lb)

Sport
- Style: Greco-Roman
- Club: Asovmash Wrestling Club
- Coach: Oleg Evtuchenko
Medal record
Men's Greco-Roman wrestling
Representing Ukraine
European Championships
Bronze medal – third place	2003 Belgrade	55 kg

Oleksiy Borysovych Vakulenko (Ukrainian: Олексій Борисович Вакуленко; March 28, 1981 – March 3, 2007) was an amateur Ukrainian Greco-Roman wrestler, who competed in the men's featherweight category. He won a bronze medal in the 55-kg division at the 2003 European Wrestling Championships in Belgrade, Serbia and Montenegro, and then finished fourth at the 2004 Summer Olympics, representing his nation Ukraine. Throughout his sporting career, Vakulenko trained full-time for Asovmash Wrestling Club in Mariupol, under his personal coach Oleg Evtuchenko.

== Career ==
Vakulenko qualified for the Ukrainian squad in the men's 55 kg class at the 2004 Summer Olympics in Athens. Earlier in the process, he received a berth and rounded out the top ten spots from the 2003 World Wrestling Championships in Créteil, France. Vakulenko opened the prelim pool with a shut out 4–0 victory over Czech Republic's Petr Švehla, and followed it with a stunning 3–0 upset over U.S. wrestler and 1996 Olympic silver medalist Dennis Hall to secure him a spot for the medal rounds. Vakulenko edged past Georgia's Irakli Chochua (14–12) in the quarterfinals, before being overwhelmed by eventual Olympic champion István Majoros of Hungary with a 3–1 verdict. Vakulenko challenged against Greek wrestler Artiom Kiouregkian for the bronze medal, but could not throw him off the mat in front of the home crowd and lost the match 1–6, dropping the Ukrainian to fourth.

On March 3, 2007, at age 25, Vakulenko returned from his friend's wedding in Kramatorsk, when his car collided into an electric pylon, killing him and severely injuring three of his colleagues. Since 2013, a memorial wrestling tournament has been held in Donetsk to remember him.
