= Masatoshi Toyota =

Japanese Greco-Roman wrestler

Personal information
- Full name: Masatoshi Toyota
- Nationality: Japan
- Born: 25 October 1976 (age 49) Itano, Tokushima, Japan
- Height: 1.62 m (5 ft 4 in)
- Weight: 55 kg (121 lb)

Sport
- Style: Greco-Roman
- Club: Tokyo Metropolitan Police; Department
- Coach: Masakazu Hijikata

Masatoshi Toyota (豊田 雅俊, Toyota Masatoshi; born October 25, 1976) is a retired amateur Japanese Greco-Roman wrestler, who competed in the men's featherweight category. He represented his nation Japan at the 2004 Summer Olympics, and then finished eighth in the 55-kg division at the 2006 Asian Games in Doha, Qatar. Having worked as a police officer in the Tokyo Metropolitan Police Department, Toyota also served as a member of its wrestling squad under head coach Masakazu Hijikata.

Toyota qualified for the Japanese squad in the men's 55 kg class at the 2004 Summer Olympics in Athens. Earlier in the process, he defeated Russia's Geidar Mamedaliyev in the final match and received a berth from the second Olympic Qualification Tournament in Tashkent, Uzbekistan. He lost his opening match 3–5 to Hungarian wrestler and eventual Olympic champion István Majoros, but wrestled his stretch to score a 10–0 technical fall over Dominican Republic's Jansel Ramírez to close the prelim pool. Placing behind Majoros in the pool and tenth in the final standings, Toyota failed to advance further into the quarterfinals.
