= Ruslan Vartanov =

Lithuanian Greco-Roman wrestler and coach

Personal information
- Born: 18 August 1971 (age 54) Vilnius, Lithuanian SSR, Soviet Union
- Height: 1.64 m (5 ft 4 1/2 in)
- Weight: 58 kg (128 lb)

Sport
- Sport: Wrestling
- Event: Greco-Roman
- Coached by: Eduard Fainstein; Victor Ivankin

Ruslan Vartanov (born 18 August 1971; Lithuanian: Ruslanas Vartanovas) is a retired Lithuanian Greco-Roman wrestler and coach. He is a fifteen-time Lithuanian Champion in several weight classes and won the Baltic Sea Games in 1993. Vartanov competed at the 1996 Summer Olympics in Atlanta. He is currently one of the coaches of the Lithuanian national Greco-Roman wrestling team. In 2002, he graduated from the Lithuanian University of Educational Sciences.
