= Asset Imanbayev =

Kazakhstani Greco-Roman wrestler

Personal information
- Full name: Aset Zhumashovich Imanbayev
- Nationality: Kazakhstan
- Born: 23 September 1981 (age 44) Urzhar, East Kazakhstan Province, Kazakh SSR, Soviet Union
- Height: 1.60 m (5 ft 3 in)
- Weight: 55 kg (121 lb)

Sport
- Sport: Wrestling
- Event: Greco-Roman
- Club: PSK Daulet
- Coached by: Nurgasin Ryspek
Medal record
Men's Greco-Roman wrestling
Representing Kazakhstan
Asian Games
Gold medal – first place	2002 Busan	55 kg
Asian Championships
Gold medal – first place	2003 Delhi	55 kg
Gold medal – first place	2004 Almaty	55 kg

Aset Zhumashovich Imanbayev (also Asset Imanbayev, Kazakh: Әсет Жұмашұлы Иманбаев; born September 23, 1981) is an amateur Kazakhstani Greco-Roman wrestler, who played for the men's featherweight category. He is a two-time Asian wrestling champion (2003 and 2004), and a gold medalist for his division at the 2002 Asian Games in Busan, South Korea.

Imanbayev represented Kazakhstan at the 2008 Summer Olympics, where he competed for the men's 55 kg class. He received a bye for the second preliminary round, before losing out to Armenia's Roman Amoyan, with a two-set technical score (1–4, 1–3), and classification point score of 1–3.
