= Uran Kalilov =

Kyrgyzstani wrestler (born 1980)

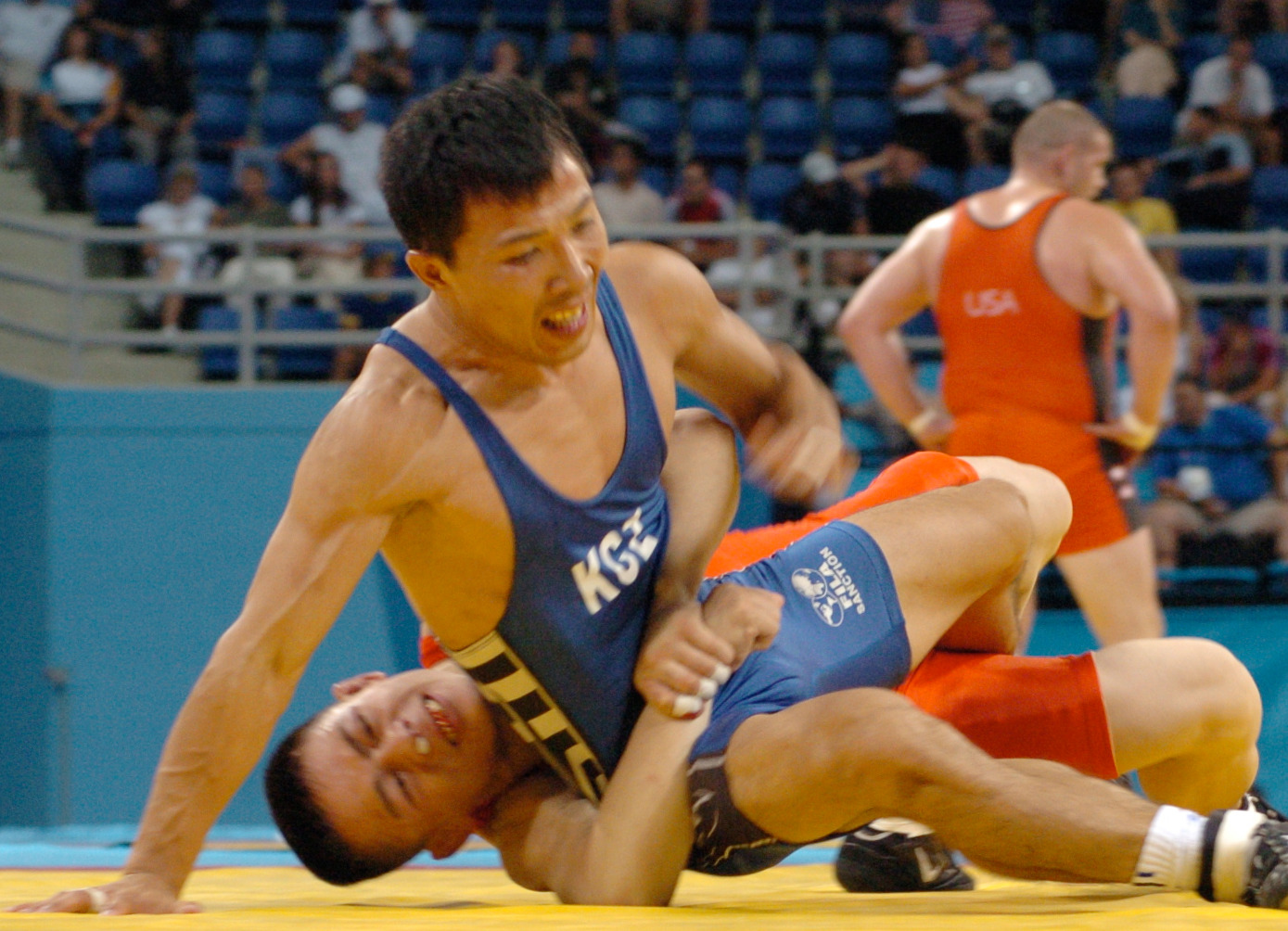
- Kalilov (front) at the 2004 Olympics

Personal information
- Full name: Uran Kalilov
- Nationality: Kyrgyzstan
- Born: 20 December 1980 (age 45) Talas, Kirghiz SSR, Soviet Union
- Height: 1.65 m (5 ft 5 in)
- Weight: 55 kg (121 lb)

Sport
- Style: Greco-Roman
- Club: Ryon Wrestling Club
- Coach: Yusup Kalilov
Medal record
Representing Kyrgyzstan
Asian Games
Bronze medal – third place	2002 Busan	55 kg
Asian Championships
Bronze medal – third place	2001 Ulaanbaatar	54 kg

Uran Kalilov (Russian: Уран Калилов; born 20 December 1980) is a Kyrgyz former amateur Greco-Roman wrestler, who competed in the men's featherweight category. He represented his nation Kyrgyzstan in two editions of the Olympic Games (2000 and 2004) and also captured two silver medals each in the 54 and 55-kg division at the 2001 Asian Wrestling Championships in Ulaanbaatar, Mongolia and at the 2002 Asian Games in Busan, South Korea. Kalilov also trained throughout his sporting career for Ryon Wrestling Club in Bishkek under his father and personal coach Yusup Kalilov.

Kalilov made his international debut at the 2000 Summer Olympics in Sydney, competing in the men's bantamweight division (54 kg (119 lb)). In the preliminary pool, he opened his match by easily throwing U.S. wrestler Steven Mays off the mat on technical superiority and wrestled his way to edge past Egypt's Mohamed Abou Elela with a 3–1 verdict. Facing against Ukraine's Andriy Kalashnykov to close the pool, Kalilov could not hold tightly over his opponent and lost the match by a comfortable 3–0 decision. Placing second in the pool and eighth in the final standings, Kalilov's performance fell short to put him through to the next round.

Shortly after the Games, Kalilov came strong with a bronze medal effort at the 2001 Asian Wrestling Championships in Ulaanbaatar, Mongolia, and went on to finish fourth at the World Championships in Patras, Greece few months later, losing 1–3 to Olympic silver medalist Lázaro Rivas of Cuba. He also entered the 2002 Asian Games in Busan, South Korea as a medal favorite in the 55 kg class, and picked up a bronze over China's Wang Hui by a close 6–5 verdict.

At the 2004 Summer Olympics in Athens, Kalilov qualified for his second Kyrgyz squad, as a 23-year-old, in the men's 55 kg class. Earlier in the process, he placed sixth and received a spot on the Kyrgyz wrestling team from the 2003 World Wrestling Championships in Créteil, France. Unlike his previous Olympics, Kalilov delivered a catastrophic game plan in the prelim pool. He lost three straight matches each to China's Sheng Jiang by a 3–3 draw and a double warning, to Greece's Artiom Kiouregkian by a pin, and to Denmark's Håkan Nyblom by a satisfying 3–0 verdict, leaving him on the bottom of the pool and placing eighteenth in the final standings.
