= Vahan Juharyan =

Armenian Greco-Roman wrestler

Personal information
- Born: 26 January 1978 (age 48) Gyumri, Armenia
- Height: 1.62 m (5 ft 4 in)
- Weight: 64 kg (141 lb)

Sport
- Sport: Wrestling
- Event: Greco-Roman
- Club: Hayastan Gyumri
- Coached by: Ara Abrahamian
Medal record
Men's Greco-Roman wrestling
World Championships
Silver medal – second place	1997 Wroclaw	54 kg
European Championship
Gold medal – first place	2004 Haparanda	60 kg

Vahan Juharyan (Armenian: Վահան Ջուհարյանին; born 26 January 1978) is an Armenian wrestler. He won the silver medal at the 1997 World Wrestling Championships in Wrocław and gold medal at the 2004 European Wrestling Championships in Haparanda.

Juharyan was a member of the Armenian Greco-Roman wrestling team at the 2010 Wrestling World Cup. The Armenian team came in third place.
