= Petr Švehla =

Czech Olympic wrestler (born 1972)

Personal information
- Full name: Petr Švehla
- Nationality: Czech Republic
- Born: 1 April 1972 (age 54) Hodonín, Czechoslovakia
- Height: 1.67 m (5 ft 5 1/2 in)
- Weight: 60 kg (132 lb)

Sport
- Style: Greco-Roman
- Club: PSK Olymp Praha
- Coach: Ervin Varga
Medal record
Men's Greco-Roman wrestling
Representing Czech Republic
World Championships
Bronze medal – third place	2005 Budapest	60 kg
European Championships
Gold medal – first place	2001 Istanbul	58 kg
Bronze medal – third place	2004 Haparanda	55 kg

Petr Švehla (born 1 April 1972 in Hodonín) is a retired amateur Czech Greco-Roman wrestler, who competed in the men's featherweight category. He picked up two career medals at the European Championships (2001 and 2004), scored a bronze in the 60-kg division at the 2005 World Wrestling Championships in Budapest, Hungary, and also represented as part of the Czech Republic team in two editions of the Olympic Games (2000 and 2004). Before his sporting career ended in 2009, Svehla trained as a member of the wrestling squad for PSK Olymp Praha in Prague, under his longtime coach Ervin Varga.

Svehla made his official debut at the 2000 Summer Olympics in Sydney, where he competed in the men's bantamweight division (54 kg). He lost two matches in the prelim pool each to China's Wang Hui (3–8) and Iran's Hassan Rangraz (2–8). Placing on the bottom of the pool and sixteenth overall, Svehla failed to advance to the quarterfinals.

Shortly after the Games, Svehla came stronger from his Olympic setback with a marvelous victory and a gold medal effort over Georgia's Irakli Chochua in the 58-kg division at the 2001 European Championships in Istanbul, Turkey. Although he missed his title defense in the same tournament twice, Svehla managed to halt his medal drought by picking up the bronze in Haparanda, Sweden three years later.

Determined to return to the Olympic scene and medal, Svehla entered the 2004 Summer Olympics in Athens on his second debut, as a 30-year-old veteran, in the men's 55 kg class. Earlier in the process, he placed fourth from the 2003 World Wrestling Championships in Créteil, France to guarantee his spot on the Czech wrestling team to the Games. As a resemblance to his previous Olympics, Svehla delivered the same fate with a pair of unprecedented defeats from U.S. wrestler and 1996 Olympic silver medalist Dennis Hall (2–3) and Ukraine's Oleksiy Vakulenko (0–4), leaving him again on the bottom and placing nineteenth in the final standings.

At the 2005 World Wrestling Championships in Budapest, Hungary, Svehla overcame from his another Olympic setback to capture the bronze medal over the host nation's Laszlo Kliment with a striking 2–1 effort in the 60-kg category.
