= Li Hui (wrestler) =

Chinese freestyle wrestler

Personal information
- Born: March 25, 1985 (age 41)

Sport
- Country: China
- Sport: Amateur wrestling
- Event: Freestyle wrestling

Li Hui (simplified Chinese: 李绘; traditional Chinese: 李繪; pinyin: Lǐ Huì; born March 25, 1985, in Guangxi) is a female Chinese freestyle wrestler who competed at the 2004 Summer Olympics.

She finished ninth in the 48 kg freestyle competition.
