= Ercan Yıldız =

Turkish Greco-Roman wrestler

Personal information
- Full name: Ercan Yıldız
- Nationality: Turkey
- Born: 29 May 1974 (age 52) Kırıkkale, Turkey
- Height: 1.63 m (5 ft 4 in)
- Weight: 55 kg (121 lb)

Sport
- Style: Greco-Roman
- Club: İstanbul B.B.
- Coach: Gazi Özbilgin
Medal record
Men's Greco-Roman wrestling
Representing Turkey
World Championships
Gold medal – first place	1997 Wrocław	54 kg
European Championships
Silver medal – second place	2001 Istanbul	54 kg
Mediterranean Games
Bronze medal – third place	1997 Bari	54 kg

Ercan Yıldız (born May 29, 1974, in Kırıkkale) is a retired amateur Turkish Greco-Roman wrestler, who competed in the men's featherweight category. Considered one of Turkey's most prominent wrestlers of his decade, Yildiz has produced a full set of three career medals in different color, including his prestigious gold from the 1997 World Wrestling Championships, and later represented as part of the Turkish team in two editions of the Olympic Games (2000 and 2004). Before his sporting career ended shortly after the 2004 Summer Olympics, Yildiz trained as a member of the wrestling squad for the Istanbul Metropolitan Sports Club (Turkish: İstanbul Büyükşehir Belediyespor), under his longtime coach Gazi Özbilgin.

Yildiz emerged himself into a sporting fame at the 1997 Mediterranean Games in Bari, Italy, where he ousted his former Yugoslav rival Senad Rizvanović for the bronze medal in the 54-kg division. Two months later, Yildiz celebrated his first victory for the Turks with a prestigious gold medal over Armenia's Vahan Juharyan on his final match 1–0 at the World Championships in Wrocław, Poland.

At the 2000 Summer Olympics in Sydney, Yildiz qualified for the Turkish squad in the men's bantamweight division (54 kg). In the prelim pool, he lost his opening match 10–0 to eventual Olympic silver medalist Lázaro Rivas of Cuba on technical superiority, but picked up a tremendous victory over New Zealand's Jotham Pellew by a rare 16–0 thrashing. Facing against Azerbaijan's Natig Eyvazov to close the pool, Yildiz could not turn down his opponent on the ring, and lost the match by a comfortable 3–0 decision. Placing third in the pool and eleventh overall, Yildiz failed to advance to the medal rounds.

Determined to return to the Olympic scene and medal, Yildiz entered the 2004 Summer Olympics in Athens on his second debut, as a 30-year-old veteran, in the men's 55 kg class. Earlier in the process, he placed second behind U.S. wrestler and 1996 Olympic silver medalist Brandon Paulson from the Olympic Qualification Tournament in Novi Sad, Serbia and Montenegro to guarantee his spot on the Turkish wrestling team to the Games. Yildiz started the prelim pool with a 4–1 defeat to Georgian neophyte Irakli Chochua. He bounced back to dismantle Lithuanian teen Svajūnas Adomaitis with a 3–1 verdict, but his performance was not enough to put him again into the medal rounds, leaving the Games empty-handed in twelfth position.

Since his sporting career shortly ended after the 2004 Summer Olympics, Yildiz has served as one of the assistant coaches for the national team, and later became the vice-president of the Turkish Wrestling Federation (Turkish: Türkiye Güreş Federasyonu, TGF). Since 2007, Yildiz is also married to fellow 2004 Olympian and race walker Yeliz Ay.
