= Mukesh Khatri =

Italian Greco-Roman wrestler

Personal information
- Full name: Mukesh Khatri
- Nationality: India
- Born: 8 October 1982 (age 43) Madhya Pradesh, India
- Height: 1.65 m (5 ft 5 in)
- Weight: 55 kg (121 lb)

Sport
- Country: INDIA/USA
- Style: Greco-Roman
- Club: Sonkar Wrestling Club
- Coach: R.P. Thakran
Medal record
Men's Greco-Roman wrestling
Representing India
Asian Championships
Bronze medal – third place	2005 Wuhan	55 kg

Mukesh Khatri (born October 8, 1982 in Madhya Pradesh) is a retired amateur Indian Greco-Roman wrestler, who competed in the men's featherweight category. He represented his nation India at the 2004 Summer Olympics, and then scored a bronze medal in the 55-kg division at the 2005 Asian Wrestling Championships in Wuhan, China. Khatri also served as a member of and trained for Sonkar Wrestling Club in Delhi, under his coach and mentor R.P. Thakran.

Khatri qualified for the Indian squad, as a lone Greco-Roman wrestler, in the men's 55 kg class at the 2004 Summer Olympics in Athens. Earlier in the process, he placed fourth and received a berth on the Indian team from the Olympic Qualification Tournament in Tashkent, Uzbekistan. He lost two straight matches each by a 3–0 identical margin to eventual silver medalist Geidar Mamedaliyev of Russia, and reigning world champion Dariusz Jabłoński of Poland, leaving him on the bottom of the prelim pool and placing penultimate out of 22 wrestlers in the final standings.
