= Wang Hui (wrestler) =

Chinese wrestler (born 1976)

Wang Hui (Chinese: 王辉, born 28 November 1976) is a Chinese former wrestler. He won a bronze medal at the 1998 Asian Games, competing in Men's Greco-Roman 54 kg. He also competed in the 2000 Summer Olympics.
