= Dariusz Jabłoński (wrestler) =

Polish Greco-Roman wrestler

Personal information
- Full name: Dariusz Jabłoński
- Nationality: Poland
- Born: 28 April 1973 (age 53) Chełm, Poland
- Height: 1.64 m (5 ft 4 1/2 in)
- Weight: 55 kg (121 lb)

Sport
- Style: Greco-Roman
- Club: Cement Gryf
- Coach: Krzysztof Grabczuk; Andrzej Głąb
Medal record
Men's Greco-Roman wrestling
Representing Poland
World Championships
Gold medal – first place	2003 Créteil	55 kg
European Championships
Gold medal – first place	1997 Kouvola	54 kg
Silver medal – second place	1999 Sofia	54 kg
Bronze medal – third place	2001 Istanbul	54 kg
Bronze medal – third place	2002 Seinäjoki	55 kg

Dariusz Jabłoński (born 28 April 1973 in Chełm) is a retired amateur Polish Greco-Roman wrestler, who competed in the men's featherweight category. Considering one of the world's top Greco-Roman wrestlers in his decade, Jablonski has yielded a remarkable tally of five career medals, including his prestigious gold from the 2003 World Wrestling Championships, and later represented as part of the Polish team in three editions of the Olympic Games (1996, 2000, and 2004). Throughout his sporting career, Jablonski trained for Cement Gryf Wrestling Club in Chełm, under his personal coaches Krzysztof Grabczuk and 1988 Olympic silver medalist Andrzej Głąb.

Jablonski made his official debut at the 1996 Summer Olympics in Atlanta, where he competed in the men's flyweight division (52 kg). He pinned Romania's Valentin Rebegea in the opening bout, before losing his next match 0–8 to Russia's Samvel Danielyan. Entering the repechage rounds, Jablonski wrestled his way to successfully defeat Dominican Republic's Ulises Valentin with another pin and South Korea's Ha Tae-yeon with a rigid 3–2 decision. He fell behind Ukraine's Andriy Kalashnykov in the fifth round 5–8, and had an astounding 2–3 upset from Ha in their rematch for seventh place, dropping Jablonski to eighth.

At the 2000 Summer Olympics in Sydney, Jablonski qualified for his second Polish squad in the men's bantamweight division (54 kg). Unlike his previous Olympics, Jablonski undermined his gaming strategy in the prelim pool. He lost his opening match to eventual Olympic champion Sim Kwon-ho of South Korea on technical superiority and was wretchedly pinned by Kazakhstan's Rakymzhan Assembekov, leaving him on the bottom of the pool and placing penultimate out of 22 wrestlers in the final standings.

Shortly after the Games, Jablonski regained his form and came powerful with two bronze medals in the bantamweight division at the European Championships. Upon entering the 2003 World Wrestling Championships in Créteil, France, Jablonski ousted South Korea's Im Dae-won on his final match to capture the featherweight title and guarantee a spot on the Polish Olympic team.

Determined to return to the Olympic scene and medal, Jablonski arrived at the 2004 Summer Olympics in Athens on his third stint, as a 31-year-old veteran, in the men's 55 kg class. Earlier in the process, he won a gold medal over South Korea's Im at the World Championships. Jablonski lost his opening match to eventual Olympic silver medalist Geidar Mamedaliyev of Russia by a 3–0 verdict, but sailed smoothly to turn down India's Mukesh Khatri on the mat with an identical margin during the prelim pool round. Finishing second in the pool and fifteenth overall, Jablonski's performance was not enough to advance him to the quarterfinals.
