= Håkan Nyblom =

Danish Greco-Roman wrestler

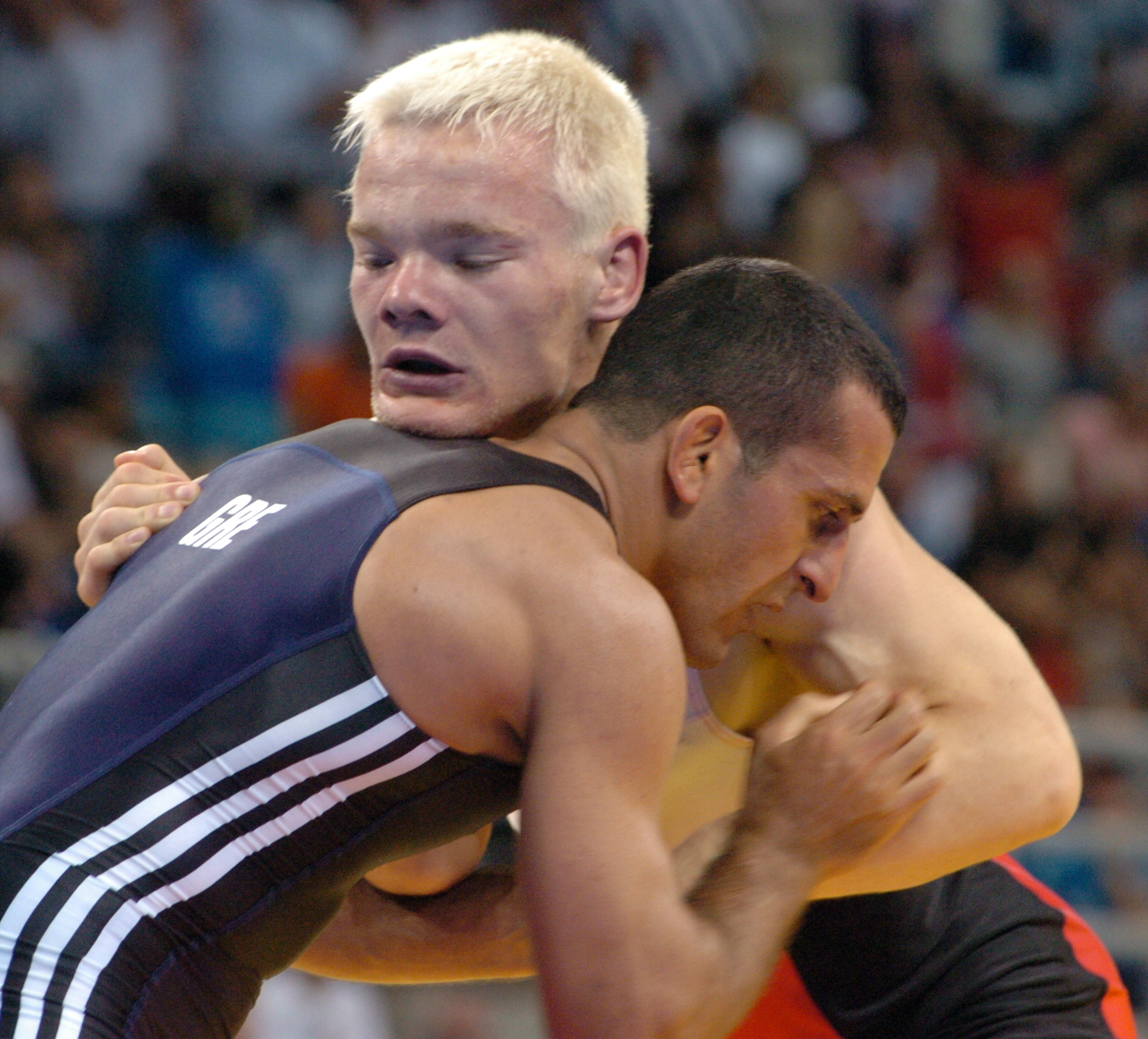
- Nyblom (behind) at the 2004 Olympics

Personal information
- Full name: Håkan Erik Nyblom
- Nationality: Denmark
- Born: 26 November 1981 (age 44) Vaasa, Finland
- Height: 1.58 m (5 ft 2 in)
- Weight: 55 kg (121 lb)

Sport
- Sport: Wrestling
- Event: Greco-Roman
- Club: Herning Brydeklub (DEN)
- Coached by: Jarek Pzyara (since 2005); Szymon Kogut (national)
Medal record
Representing Denmark
World Championships
| Bronze medal – third place | 2009 Herning | 55 kg |

Håkan Erik Nyblom (born 26 November 1981) is a retired Greco-Roman wrestler. He and his twin brother Anders were born in Vaasa, Finland, and they moved to Ølgod, Denmark, when they were young. Their mother is Helena Susanne Konster, born in Vaasa. They competed throughout their careers for Denmark in the 55 kg featherweight division - Håkan qualified for the 2004 and 2012 Olympics, where he placed eighth and fifth, respectively, while Anders finished 11th in 2008. In 2009 Håkan won a bronze medal at the world championships, after losing to Hamid Sourian in the semifinal.

At the 2004 Olympics Håkan placed second in the preliminary pool. At the 2012 Olympics, he lost to Sourian in the semifinal, and then to Péter Módos in the bronze medal bout.
