= Irakli Chochua =

Georgian Greco-Roman wrestler

Personal information
- Full name: Irakli Chochua
- Nationality: Georgia
- Born: 15 September 1979 (age 46) Poti, Georgian SSR, Soviet Union
- Height: 1.60 m (5 ft 3 in)
- Weight: 55 kg (121 lb)

Sport
- Style: Greco-Roman
- Club: Tshevardani Tbilisi
- Coach: Villiam Kharazov
Medal record
Men's Greco-Roman wrestling
Representing Georgia
European Championships
| Silver medal – second place | 2001 Istanbul | 54 kg |

Irakli Chochua (Georgian: ირაკლი ჭოჭუა; born September 15, 1979, in Poti) is a retired amateur Georgian Greco-Roman wrestler, who competed in the men's featherweight category. He claimed a silver medal in the 54-kg division at the 2001 European Championships in Istanbul, Turkey, and later represented his nation Georgia at the 2004 Summer Olympics. Chochua also trained for Tshevardani Wrestling Club in Tbilisi, under his personal coach Villiam Kharazov.

Chochua qualified for the Georgian wrestling squad in the men's 55 kg class at the 2004 Summer Olympics in Athens, by receiving a berth and placing fourth from the Olympic Qualification Tournament in Novi Sad, Serbia and Montenegro. He upset Turkish wrestler and two-time Olympian Ercan Yıldız with a striking 4–1 decision on his opening bout, and then overpowered Lithuania's Svajūnas Adomaitis to earn a coveted spot in the quarterfinals. Fighting against Ukraine's Oleksiy Vakulenko in his knockout match, Chochua could not score two more points to push him off the mat with a score 12–14, before he faced a fifth-place battle with Cuba's Lázaro Rivas and then fell short from the ring by a technical superiority rule.
