= Ha Tae-yeon =

South Korean wrestler

Medal record

Representing South Korea

Men's Greco-Roman wrestling

World Championships
| Silver medal – second place | 1999 Athens | 54 kg |

Asian Championships
| Gold medal – first place | 2000 Seoul | 54 kg |
| Silver medal – second place | 1996 Xiaoshan | 52 kg |

Ha Tae-yeon (Korean: 하태연; Hanja: 河泰連; born March 27, 1976) is a retired South Korean wrestler. He was born in Daegu, South Korea.

== Bibliography ==
- Ha Tae-yeon's profile from sports-reference
