= Artiom Kiouregkian =

Greek wrestler (born 1976)

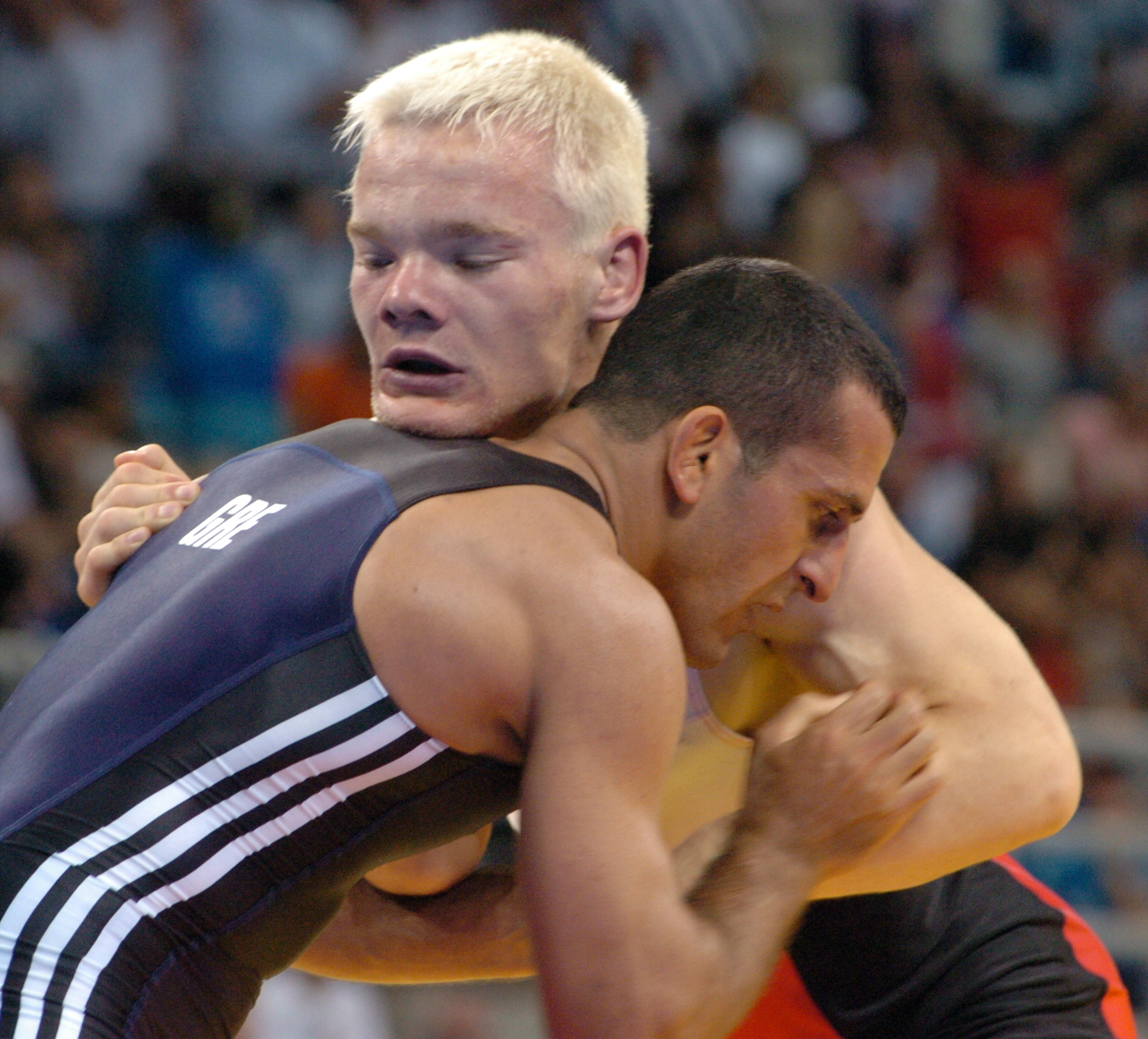
- Kyuregyan (front) at the 2004 Olympics

Personal information
- Nationality: Greek
- Born: 9 September 1976 (age 49) Gyumri, Armenia
- Height: 1.57 m (5 ft 2 in)
- Weight: 55 kg (121 lb)

Sport
- Sport: Wrestling
- Event: Greco-Roman
- Club: Olympiacos
- Coached by: Khachatur Vardanyan; Arutika Rubenian
Medal record
Men's Greco-Roman wrestling
Representing Greece
Olympic Games
Bronze medal – third place	2004 Athens	55 kg
European Championships
Silver medal – second place	2004 Haparanda	55 kg

Artiom Kiouregkian (Greek: Αρτιόμ Κιουρεγκιάν, born 9 September 1976) is an Armenian-born Greek wrestler. He won a bronze medal at the 2004 Summer Olympic Games in the Greco-Roman featherweight division.

== Biography ==
Kyuregyan was born on 9 September 1976 in Leninakan (now Gyumri), Armenia. He took up Greco-Roman wrestling at the age of 6 years under Khachatur Vardanyan. From 1992 to 1999 he lived in Ulyanovsk, Russia, where he was trained at Dynamo club by Anatoly Vinnik. In 1997 he placed second at the Russian championships. In 1999 he moved to Greece, where he continued wrestling under the guidance of his cousin Arutika Rubenian.

The greatest success of his career came in 2004. At the European Wrestling Championships in Haparanda he reached the final. At the 2004 Summer Olympics in Athens, he won his first three bouts, then lost in the semifinal, and won a bronze medal match.

In 2001–2007 Kyuregyan competed for the German club KSV Aalen, and then in 2010–2011 for RKG Freiburg.
