= Tero Katajisto =

Finnish wrestler

Personal information
- Nationality: Finnish
- Born: 12 September 1971 (age 54) Jurva, Finland

Sport
- Sport: Wrestling

Tero Katajisto (born 12 September 1971) is a Finnish wrestler. He competed in the men's Greco-Roman 54 kg at the 2000 Summer Olympics.
