= 2003 World Wrestling Championships =

Freestyle
- Host city: New York City, United States
- Dates: 12–14 September 2003
- Stadium: Madison Square Garden

Greco-Roman
- Host city: Créteil, France
- Dates: 2–5 October 2003
- Stadium: Palais des Sports Robert Oubron

Champions
- Freestyle: Georgia
- Greco-Roman: Georgia
- Women: Japan

The following is the final results of the 2003 World Wrestling Championships. The Freestyle Competition was held in New York City, New York, while the Greco-Roman Competition was held in Créteil, France.

== Medal table ==
Rank	Nation	Gold	Silver	Bronze	Total
1	Russia	5	2	2	9
2	Japan	5	0	1	6
3	Georgia	2	0	2	4
4	Uzbekistan	2	0	0	2
5	United States	1	6	2	9
6	Bulgaria	1	1	1	3
6	Ukraine	1	1	1	3
8	Poland	1	1	0	2
8	Sweden	1	1	0	2
10	Azerbaijan	1	0	0	1
10	Israel	1	0	0	1
12	Cuba	0	2	1	3
13	South Korea	0	1	2	3
14	Hungary	0	1	1	2
14	Iran	0	1	1	2
16	Belarus	0	1	0	1
16	Egypt	0	1	0	1
16	Germany	0	1	0	1
16	Moldova	0	1	0	1
20	China	0	0	2	2
20	Kazakhstan	0	0	2	2
22	Canada	0	0	1	1
22	Romania	0	0	1	1
22	Slovakia	0	0	1	1
Totals (24 entries)		21	21	21	63

== Team ranking ==
Rank	Men's freestyle		Men's Greco-Roman		Women's freestyle	
Rank	Team	Points	Team	Points	Team	Points
1	Georgia	33	Georgia	29	Japan	62
2	United States	31	Russia	25	United States	62
3	Iran	31	Ukraine	25	Russia	45
4	Russia	30	South Korea	22	China	33
5	Uzbekistan	23	Sweden	20	Ukraine	27
6	Ukraine	23	Hungary	19	Canada	24
7	Cuba	21	Cuba	17	Poland	19
8	Belarus	21	Bulgaria; Poland	15	Greece	15
9	Kazakhstan	21	Bulgaria; Poland	15	France	14
10	Bulgaria	17	Germany	15	Germany	12

== Medal summary ==
=== Men's freestyle ===
Event	Gold	Silver	Bronze
55 kg	Dilshod Mansurov; Uzbekistan	Ghenadie Tulbea; Moldova	Oleksandr Zakharuk; Ukraine
60 kg	Arif Abdullayev; Azerbaijan	Yandro Quintana; Cuba	Song Jae-myung; South Korea
66 kg	Irbek Farniev; Russia	Serafim Barzakov; Bulgaria	Kazuhiko Ikematsu; Japan
74 kg	Buvaisar Saitiev; Russia	Murad Gaidarov; Belarus	Gennadiy Laliyev; Kazakhstan
84 kg	Sazhid Sazhidov; Russia	Cael Sanderson; United States	Revaz Mindorashvili; Georgia
96 kg	Eldar Kurtanidze; Georgia	Alireza Heidari; Iran	Krasimir Kochev; Bulgaria
120 kg	Artur Taymazov; Uzbekistan	Kerry McCoy; United States	Alireza Rezaei; Iran

=== Men's Greco-Roman ===
Event	Gold	Silver	Bronze
55 kg	Dariusz Jabłoński; Poland	Im Dae-won; South Korea	Lázaro Rivas; Cuba
60 kg	Armen Nazaryan; Bulgaria	Roberto Monzón; Cuba	Eusebiu Diaconu; Romania
66 kg	Manuchar Kvirkvelia; Georgia	Armen Vardanyan; Ukraine	Levente Füredy; Hungary
74 kg	Aleksey Glushkov; Russia	Konstantin Schneider; Germany	Kim Jin-soo; South Korea
84 kg	Gocha Tsitsiashvili; Israel	Ara Abrahamian; Sweden	Attila Bátky; Slovakia
96 kg	Martin Lidberg; Sweden	Karam Gaber; Egypt	Ramaz Nozadze; Georgia
120 kg	Khasan Baroev; Russia	Mihály Deák-Bárdos; Hungary	Georgiy Tsurtsumia; Kazakhstan

=== Women's freestyle ===
Event	Gold	Silver	Bronze
48 kg	Iryna Merleni; Ukraine	Patricia Miranda; United States	Li Hui; China
51 kg	Chiharu Icho; Japan	Natalia Karamchakova; Russia	Jenny Wong; United States
55 kg	Saori Yoshida; Japan	Tina George; United States	Natalia Golts; Russia
59 kg	Seiko Yamamoto; Japan	Natalia Ivashko; Russia	Sally Roberts; United States
63 kg	Kaori Icho; Japan	Sara McMann; United States	Viola Yanik; Canada
67 kg	Kristie Marano; United States	Ewelina Pruszko; Poland	Svetlana Martinenko; Russia
72 kg	Kyoko Hamaguchi; Japan	Toccara Montgomery; United States	Wang Xu; China

== Participating nations ==
=== Freestyle ===
400 competitors from 64 nations participated.

- Albania (2)
- Armenia (5)
- Australia (9)
- Austria (6)
- Azerbaijan (5)
- Belarus (11)
- Brazil (7)
- Bulgaria (11)
- Cameroon (1)
- Canada (14)
- China (12)
- Chinese Taipei (10)
- Colombia (2)
- Cuba (3)
- Czech Republic (4)
- El Salvador (1)
- Estonia (2)
- Finland (1)
- France (9)
- Georgia (7)
- Germany (14)
- Great Britain (4)
- Greece (14)
- Guam (2)
- Hungary (12)
- India (10)
- Iran (7)
- Ireland (1)
- Israel (4)
- Italy (8)
- Japan (14)
- Kazakhstan (10)
- Kyrgyzstan (8)
- Latvia (3)
- Lithuania (1)
- Macedonia (3)
- Moldova (5)
- Mongolia (8)
- Namibia (1)
- Netherlands (2)
- New Zealand (2)
- Norway (2)
- Palestine (1)
- Panama (2)
- Peru (3)
- Poland (10)
- Puerto Rico (6)
- Romania (7)
- Russia (14)
- Senegal (7)
- Slovakia (5)
- South Africa (2)
- South Korea (10)
- Spain (7)
- Sweden (4)
- Switzerland (7)
- Tajikistan (3)
- Turkey (11)
- Turkmenistan (2)
- Uganda (1)
- Ukraine (14)
- United States (14)
- Uzbekistan (6)
- Venezuela (7)

=== Greco-Roman ===
283 competitors from 62 nations participated.

- Albania (1)
- Armenia (7)
- Australia (4)
- Austria (4)
- Azerbaijan (4)
- Belarus (7)
- Belgium (1)
- Bosnia and Herzegovina (1)
- Bulgaria (7)
- Canada (2)
- China (7)
- Chinese Taipei (3)
- Colombia (3)
- Croatia (2)
- Cuba (7)
- Czech Republic (6)
- Denmark (4)
- Egypt (4)
- Estonia (5)
- Finland (6)
- France (7)
- Georgia (7)
- Germany (7)
- Great Britain (1)
- Greece (7)
- Hungary (7)
- India (7)
- Iran (7)
- Iraq (3)
- Israel (6)
- Italy (4)
- Japan (7)
- Kazakhstan (7)
- Kyrgyzstan (7)
- Latvia (2)
- Lithuania (7)
- Macedonia (1)
- Moldova (4)
- Netherlands (4)
- Norway (5)
- Palau (1)
- Peru (2)
- Poland (7)
- Portugal (2)
- Qatar (1)
- Romania (5)
- Russia (7)
- Serbia and Montenegro (4)
- Slovakia (2)
- South Korea (7)
- Spain (5)
- Sweden (6)
- Switzerland (5)
- Syria (1)
- Tajikistan (1)
- Tunisia (2)
- Turkey (7)
- Turkmenistan (1)
- Ukraine (7)
- United States (7)
- Uzbekistan (6)
- Venezuela (5)
