= Hassan Rangraz =

Iranian wrestler (born 1980)

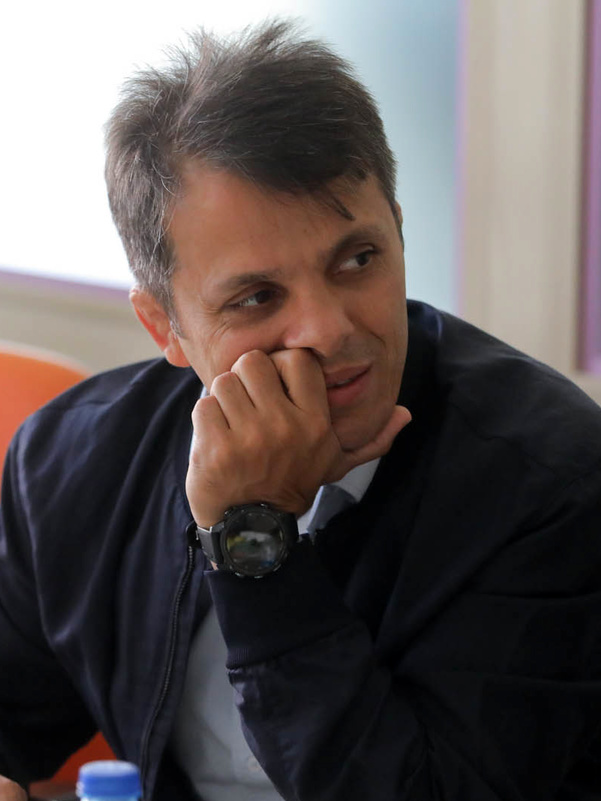
- Rangraz in 2025

Personal information
- Nationality: Iranian
- Born: 21 March 1980 (age 46) Nowshahr, Mazandaran, Iran
- Height: 167 см
- Weight: 56 kg (123 lb)

Sport
- Country: Iran
- Sport: Wrestling
- Event: Greco-Roman
- Club: Pourya-ye Vali
- Now coaching: Iran National Greco-Roman Wrestling (2023–present)
Medal record
Men's Greco-Roman wrestling
Representing Iran
World Championships
Gold medal – first place	2001 Patras	54 kg
Bronze medal – third place	2002 Moscow	55 kg
World Junior Championship
Bronze medal – third place	1999 Bucharest	54 kg
Asian Championships
Silver medal – second place	2001 Ulaanbaatar	54 kg
Bronze medal – third place	2000 Seoul	54 kg
Bronze medal – third place	2004 Almaty	55 kg

Hassan Rangraz (born March 21, 1980 in Nowshahr) is a former wrestler, coach and sports manager from Iran. He is the head coach of Iran's national wrestling team and the official instructor of the United World Wrestling. He is the head coach of the Iranian national wrestling team and an official instructor of the World Wrestling Federation and before that he was the manager of the national wrestling teams, the spokesperson of the Iran Wrestling Federation and the director general of sports and youth of Mazandaran. He has other executive responsibilities. He was the advisor to the vice president and the advisor to the head of the physical education organization from 2008 to 2010, managed the National Museum of Sports, Olympics and Paralympics, and was the vice president of the wrestling federation.

Rangraz, as a phenomenon of wrestling in Iran and the world, in the 2001 World Wrestling Championship, with a decisive victory against their opponents and contenders such as Cuban Lazaro Rivas, silver medal winner of the 2000 Sydney Olympics, and American Brandon Pelson, silver winner of the 1996 Atlanta Olympics, for the first time after the Islamic Revolution. won the world gold medal for Iranian wrestling. He also won the bronze medal at the 2002 World Championship and the gold medal at the World University Championship the following year, and was selected by Fila as the most technical freestyle wrestler in the world in 2001 and 2002, which holds the record for winning this award. In 2002, Rangraz was recognized as the country's sportsman of the year and in 2003, the sportsman of the year was.

== Other work ==
=== Education ===
- Bachelor of Public Administration - Islamic Azad University, Chalus branch.
- Master's degree in political science - Islamic Azad University, Chalus branch.
- Master's degree in physical education and sports science, management and planning in sports - University of Tehran.
- Ph.D. in Physical Education and Sports Sciences, Department of Sports Management and Planning, Islamic Azad University, Research Sciences Branch, Tehran.

=== Work experience ===
- In 2013, Hassan Rengarz was elected as the vice president of the Asian Wrestling Council.
- On 29 September 2019, Rengarz was appointed as the General Director of Sports and Youth of Mazandaran.
- In 2019, Advisor to the Vice President on Sports Affairs.

Awards
Preceded by Hossein Rezazadeh	Iran Sportsperson of the year 2001	Succeeded by Hossein Rezazadeh
