= Geidar Mamedaliyev =

Russian wrestler (born 1974)

Medal record

Representing Russia

Men's Greco-Roman wrestling

Olympic Games
Silver medal – second place	2004 Athens	55 kg

World Championships
Gold medal – first place	2002 Moscow	55 kg

World Cup
Gold medal – first place	2003 Almaty	55 kg

Geidar Mamedaliyev (Russian: Гейдар Нураддинович Мамедалиев) or Heydar Nuraddin oglu Mammadaliyev (Azerbaijani: Heydər Nürəddin oğlu Məmmədəliyev) (born April 2, 1974, in Qubadlı, Azerbaijani SSR) is a Russian wrestler of Azerbaijani descent. He currently reside in Yekaterinburg, Russia and he is the head coach of Ural Wrestlers Team.
