= Marian Sandu =

Romanian wrestler (born 1972)

Medal record

Representing Romania

Men's Greco-Roman wrestling

World Championships
Silver medal – second place	1998 Gävle	54 kg

European Championships
Gold medal – first place	2000 Moscow	54 kg
Gold medal – first place	2003 Belgrade	55 kg
Silver medal – second place	1991 Aschaffenburg	57 kg
Silver medal – second place	1992 Copenhagen	57 kg
Silver medal – second place	1996 Budapest	57 kg
Bronze medal – third place	1993 Istanbul	57 kg
Bronze medal – third place	1994 Athens	57 kg
Bronze medal – third place	1998 Minsk	54 kg
Bronze medal – third place	2001 Istanbul	58 kg

Marian Sandu (born 5 May 1972 in Ploieşti, Prahova, Romania) is a retired Romanian wrestler and Olympic champion in Greco-Roman wrestling.

Sandu has competed in four Olympics, from 1992 to 2004. At the 1992 Summer Olympics in Barcelona he was ranked sixth in Greco-Roman wrestling, the bantamweight class.
