= Lázaro Rivas =

Cuban wrestler (1975–2013)

Personal information
- Full name: Lázaro Rivas Scull
- Born: 4 April 1975 Havana, Cuba
- Died: 22 December 2013 (aged 38) San José de las Lajas, Cuba
Medal record
Men's Greco-Roman wrestling
Representing Cuba
Olympic Games
Silver medal – second place	2000 Sydney	54 kg
World Championships
Gold medal – first place	1999 Athens	54 kg
Bronze medal – third place	2001 Patras	54 kg
Bronze medal – third place	2003 Créteil	55 kg
Pan American Games
Gold medal – first place	1999 Winnipeg	54 kg
Gold medal – first place	2003 Santo Domingo	55 kg

Lázaro Rivas Scull (4 April 1975 – 22 December 2013) was a Cuban wrestler who competed in the 1996 Summer Olympics, in the 2000 Summer Olympics, and in the 2004 Summer Olympics. He was born in Havana and died in San José de las Lajas.
