= United States results in Greco-Roman wrestling =

The United States first took part in Greco-Roman wrestling competition at the Olympics in 1912. The United States first appearance at the World Championships in Greco-Roman was in 1961. Greco-Roman wrestling was held at the first modern Olympics in 1896 and the first World Championships in Greco-Roman was in 1904.

== Olympics and World Championships (Note: No official team standings are kept for the Olympics. Some team finishes are approximate.) ==
=== 1896 ===
Year	Team	Unlimited Weight
1896	DNC	Did not compete

=== 1904 ===
Year	Team	75 kg	Unlimited Weight
1904	DNC	Did not compete	Did not compete

=== 1905 ===
Year	Team	68 kg	80 kg	Unlimited Weight
1905	DNC	Did not compete	Did not compete	Did not compete

=== 1906–1907 ===
Year	Team	75 kg	85 kg	Unlimited Weight
1906	DNC	Did not compete	Did not compete	Did not compete
1907	DNC	Did not compete	Did not compete	Did not compete

=== 1908–1909 ===
Year	Team	66 kg	73 kg	93 kg	Unlimited Weight
1908	DNC	Did not compete	Did not compete	Did not compete	Did not compete

Year	Team	75 kg	Unlimited Weight
1908	DNC	Did not compete	Did not compete
1909	DNC	Did not compete	Did not compete

=== 1910 ===
Year	Team	60 kg	70 kg	85 kg	Unlimited Weight
1910	DNC	Did not compete	Did not compete	Did not compete	Did not compete

=== 1911 ===
Year	Team	60 kg	67 kg	73 kg	83 kg	Unlimited Weight
1911	DNC	Did not compete	Did not compete	Did not compete	Did not compete	Did not compete

=== 1912 ===
Year	Team	60 kg	67.5 kg	75 kg	82.5 kg	Unlimited Weight
1912	N/A	Lysohn, William (DNP)	No Competitor	No Competitor	No Competitor	No Competitor
		Retzer, George (DNP)				

=== 1913 ===
Year	Team	67.5 kg	75 kg	82.5 kg	Unlimited Weight
1913	DNC	Did not compete	Did not compete	Did not compete	Did not compete

=== 1920 ===
Year	Team	60 kg	67.5 kg	75 kg	82.5 kg	Unlimited Weight
1920	N/A	Brian, Adrian (DNP)	Metropoulos, George (DNP)	Szymanski, Henry (DNP)	Maichle, Frank (DNP)	Weyand, Alexander (4th)
		Gallery, Daniel (DNP)	Swigart, Oral (DNP)	Zanoline, Paul (DNP)	Pendleton, Nat (DNP)	Willkie, Edward (5th)

Year	Team	60 kg	67.5 kg	75 kg	82.5 kg	Unlimited Weight
1920	DNC	Did not compete	Did not compete	Did not compete	Did not compete	Did not compete

=== 1921–1928 ===
Year	Team	58 kg	62 kg	67.5 kg	75 kg	82.5 kg	Unlimited Weight
1921	DNC	Did not compete	Did not compete	Did not compete	Did not compete	Did not compete	Did not compete
1922	DNC	Did not compete	Did not compete	Did not compete	Did not compete	Did not compete	Did not compete
1924	DNC	Did not compete	Did not compete	Did not compete	Did not compete	Did not compete	Did not compete
1928	DNC	Did not compete	Did not compete	Did not compete	Did not compete	Did not compete	Did not compete

=== 1932–1936 ===
Year	Team	56 kg	61 kg	66 kg	72 kg	79 kg	87 kg	Unlimited Weight
1932	DNC	Did not compete	Did not compete	Did not compete	Did not compete	Did not compete	Did not compete	Did not compete
1936	DNC	Did not compete	Did not compete	Did not compete	Did not compete	Did not compete	Did not compete	Did not compete

=== 1948–1968 ===
Year	Team	52 kg	57 kg	62 kg (−1961), 63 kg (1962–1968)	67 kg (−1961), 70 kg (1962–1968)	73 kg (−1961), 78 kg (1962–1968)	79 kg (−1961), 87 kg (1962–1968)	87 kg (−1961), 97 kg (1962–1968)	Unlimited Weight
1948	DNC	Did not compete	Did not compete	Did not compete	Did not compete	Did not compete	Did not compete	Did not compete	Did not compete
1949	N/A	No Championships Held							
1950	DNC	Did not compete	Did not compete	Did not compete	Did not compete	Did not compete	Did not compete	Did not compete	Did not compete
1951	N/A	No Championships Held							
1952	DNC	Did not compete	Did not compete	Did not compete	Did not compete	Did not compete	Did not compete	Did not compete	Did not compete
1953	DNC	Did not compete	Did not compete	Did not compete	Did not compete	Did not compete	Did not compete	Did not compete	Did not compete
1954	N/A	No Championships Held							
1955	DNC	Did not compete	Did not compete	Did not compete	Did not compete	Did not compete	Did not compete	Did not compete	Did not compete
1956	12th	Wilson, Richard (DNP)	Townley, Kent (DNP)	Rice, Alan (DNP)	Evans, Jay (DNP)	Holt, James (5th)	Peckham, James (7th)	Thomas, Dale (5th)	Lewis, Dale (DNP)
1957	N/A	No Championships Held							
1958	DNC	Did not compete	Did not compete	Did not compete	Did not compete	Did not compete	Did not compete	Did not compete	Did not compete
1959	N/A	No Championships Held							
1960	N/A	Wilson, Richard (DNP)	Lauchle, Larry (DNP)	Allen, Lee (8th)	Northrup, Ben (DNP)	Fivian, Fritz (DNP)	Camilleri, Russell (8th)	George, Howard (DNP)	Lewis, Dale (DNP)
1961	10th	Wilson, Richard (5th)	Gomes, Joseph (DNP)	Finley, Ron (DNP)	Northrup, Ben (4th)	Weick, Bill (DNP)	Camilleri, Russell (DNP)	Brand, Daniel (5th)	Lovell, Patrick (6th)
1962	10th	Wilson, Richard (DNP)	Molino, Carmen (DNP)	Grubbs, Lee (DNP)	Burke, James (3rd)	Williams, Rudy (5th)	Camilleri, Russell (DNP)	Lovell, Patrick (6th)	Wilson, Hallow (5th)
1963	12th	Fitch, Andrew (DNP)	Molino, Carmen (DNP)	Douglas, Bobby (DNP)	Northrup, Ben (DNP)	Fitzgerald, Dennis (DNP)	Baughman, Wayne (DNP)	Ferguson, James (DNP)	Raschke, James (3rd)
1964	12th	Wilson, Richard (4th)	Fitch, Andrew (DNP)	Finley, Ron (4th)	Burke, James (DNP)	Camilleri, Russell (7th)	Baughman, Wayne (7th)	Lovell, Patrick (DNP)	Pickens, Robert (6th)
1965	DNP	Sanders, Rick (DNP)	No Competitor	Douglas, Bobby (DNP)	Burke, James (DNP)	Camilleri, Russell (DNP)	Baughman, Wayne (DNP)	Conine, Gerald (DNP)	Kristoff, Larry (DNP)
1966	15th	Hazewinkel, Jim (6th)	Coffee, Charles (DNP)	Finley, Ron (6th)	Northrup, Ben (DNP)	Camilleri, Russell (DNP)	Baughman, Wayne (DNP)	Conine, Gerald (DNP)	Raschke, James (DNP)
1967	DNP	Hazewinkel, David (DNP)	Hazewinkel, Jim (DNP)	Coffee, Charles (DNP)	No Competitor	Williams, Rudy (DNP)	No Competitor	Stensland, Garry (DNP)	No Competitor
1968	14th	Tamble, Richard (DNP)	Hazewinkel, David (DNP)	Hazewinkel, Jim (7th)	Holzer, Werner (6th)	Lyden, Larry (DNP)	Baughman, Wayne (5th)	Schenk, Henk (DNP)	Roop, Robert (DNP)

=== 1969–1996 ===
Year	Team	48 kg	52 kg	57 kg	62 kg	68 kg	74 kg	82 kg	90 kg	100 kg	100+ kg (−1984), 130 kg (1985–1996)
1969	10th	No Competitor	Chavez, Art (DNP)	Hazewinkel, David (3rd)	Hazewinkel, Jim (4th)	Buzzard, Robert (DNP)	Lyden, Larry (5th)	Wells, Phil (DNP)	Deadrich, Buck (6th)	No Competitor	No Competitor
1970	9th	Kestel, Dave (DNP)	Davids, William (DNP)	Hazewinkel, David (2nd)	Hazewinkel, Jim (DNP)	Ali, Abdul Raheem (DNP)	Mihal, Richard (DNP)	Robinson, J (4th)	Baughman, Wayne (DNP)	Williams, Willie (6th)	Taylor, Chris (4th)
1971	14th	Holmes, Wayne (DNP)	Kestel, Dave (DNP)	Hazewinkel, David (DNP)	Hazewinkel, Jim (DNP)	Alexander, Gary (DNP)	Neist, Gary (DNP)	Robinson, J (5th)	Baughman, Wayne (DNP)	Williams, Willie (DNP)	No Competitor
1972	N/A	Holmes, Wayne (DNP)	Steiger, James (DNP)	Hazewinkel, David (DNP)	Hazewinkel, Jim (DNP)	Buzzard, Robert (DNP)	Neist, Gary (DNP)	Robinson, J (DNP)	Baughman, Wayne (DNP)	Deadrich, Buck (DNP)	Taylor, Chris (DNP)
1973	DNP	Kancsar, Karoly (DNP)	Thompson, Bruce (DNP)	Sade, Joseph (DNP)	Alexander, Gary (DNP)	Frey, Phil (DNP)	Ali, Abdul Raheem (DNP)	Gallego, Mike (DNP)	Williams, Willie (DNP)	Duschen, James (DNP)	McCrady, Mark (DNP)
1974	12th	Kancsar, Karoly (6th)	Thompson, Bruce (DNP)	Gust, Brian (DNP)	Lamphere, Reid (DNP)	Marcy, Patrick (DNP)	Ali, Abdul Raheem (DNP)	Nigos, Joseph (DNP)	Williams, Willie (6th)	Galler, Bill (DNP)	No Competitor
1975	14th	Kancsar, Karoly (5th)	Thompson, Bruce (DNP)	Mello, Dan (DNP)	Alexander, Gary (DNP)	Marcy, Patrick (DNP)	Ali, Abdul Raheem (DNP)	Chandler, Dan (DNP)	Williams, Willie (DNP)	Rheingans, Brad (DNP)	Van Worth, William (6th)
1976	13th	Farina, Michael (8th)	Thompson, Bruce (DNP)	Sade, Joseph (DNP)	Alexander, Gary (DNP)	Marcy, Patrick (DNP)	Matthews, John (DNP)	Chandler, Dan (DNP)	Johnson, Evan (DNP)	Rheingans, Brad (4th)	Lee, Pete (5th)
1977	13th	Howard, James (DNP)	Flemming, Michael (DNP)	Gust, Brian (DNP)	Lamphere, Reid (DNP)	Marcy, Patrick (DNP)	Matthews, John (DNP)	Chandler, Dan (6th)	Hull, Mitch (DNP)	Simons, Jeff (4th)	Lee, Pete (6th)
1978	10th	Leiva, Wilfredo (DNP)	Flemming, Michael (DNP)	Mello, Dan (DNP)	Kuzu, Abdurrahim (DNP)	Minkel, Tom (DNP)	Matthews, John (4th)	Chandler, Dan (6th)	Simons, Jeff (DNP)	Rheingans, Brad (6th)	Schoene, Craig (DNP)
1979	7th	Williams, Greg (5th)	Thompson, Bruce (DNP)	Mello, Dan (DNP)	Kuzu, Abdurrahim (2nd)	Pelci, Gary (DNP)	Matthews, John (DNP)	Chandler, Dan (5th)	Fraser, Steve (DNP)	Rheingans, Brad (3rd)	Walker, Bob (3rd)
1980	DNC	Fuller, Mark (DNC)	Thompson, Bruce (DNC)	Gust, Brian (DNC)	Mello, Dan (DNC)	Minkel, Tom (DNC)	Matthews, John (DNC)	Chandler, Dan (DNC)	Johnson, Mark (DNC)	Rheingans, Brad (DNC)	Blatnick Jeff (DNC)
1981	14th	Fuller, Mark (DNP)	Leiva, Wilfredo (DNP)	Mello, Dan (DNP)	Kuzu, Abdurrahim (6th)	Bliss, Scott (DNP)	Andre, Jim (DNP)	Chandler, Dan (DNP)	Houck, Michael (DNP)	Gibson, Greg (4th)	Carlisle, Ron (DNP)
1982	13th	Jones, TJ (DNP)	Dorrance, Lew (DNP)	Hermann, Rob (DNP)	Kuzu, Abdurrahim (DNP)	Selmon, John (DNP)	Matthews, John (DNP)	Press, Tom (DNP)	Fraser, Steve (DNP)	Gibson, Greg (DNP)	Lee, Pete (6th)
1983	18th	Fuller, Mark (7th)	Clark, Jeff (DNP)	Hermann, Rob (DNP)	Kuzu, Abdurrahim (DNP)	Martinez, Jim (DNP)	Andre, Jim (DNP)	Chandler, Dan (DNP)	Houck, Michael (DNP)	Koslowski, Dennis (6th)	Lee, Pete (DNP)
1984	1st	Fuller, Mark (DNP)	Govig, Bert (DNP)	Famiano, Frank (5th)	Kuzu, Abdurrahim (4th)	Martinez, Jim (3rd)	Catalfo, Chris (DNP)	Chandler, Dan (DNP)	Fraser, Steve (1st)	Gibson, Greg (2nd)	Blatnick Jeff (1st)
1985	5th	Jones, TJ (5th)	Fuller, Mark (DNP)	Hermann, Rob (DNP)	Wasmund, Dalen (10th)	Martinez, Jim (3rd)	Oliver, Dale (DNP)	Catalfo, Chris (6th)	Houck, Michael (1st)	Gibson, Greg (DNP)	Koslowski, Dennis (6th)
1986	15th	Wetzel, Eric (6th)	Sheldon, Shawn (DNP)	Amado, Anthony (9th)	Famiano, Frank (DNP)	Martinez, Jim (DNP)	Butler, David (DNP)	Gholar, Darrell (6th)	Waldroup, Derrick (DNP)	Koslowski, Dennis (7th)	Koslowski, Duane (4th)
1987	9th	Dorrance, Lew (10th)	Sheldon, Shawn (15th)	Amado, Anthony (4th)	Wasmund, Dalen (8th)	Martinez, Jim (10th)	Butler, David (DNP)	Catalfo, Chris (9th)	Waldroup, Derrick (11th)	Koslowski, Dennis (2nd)	Koslowski, Duane (5th)
1988	12th	Fuller, Mark (DNP)	Sheldon, Shawn (DNP)	Amado, Anthony (DNP)	Anderson, Ike (6th)	Seras, Andy (DNP)	Butler, David (DNP)	Morgan, John (7th)	Foy, Michial (DNP)	Koslowski, Dennis (3rd)	Koslowski, Duane (8th)
1989	7th	Dorrance, Lew (4th)	Fuller, Mark (9th)	Parseghian, Gogi (DNP)	Lee, Buddy (10th)	Seras, Andy (9th)	Butler, David (7th)	Morgan, John (5th)	Foy, Michial (2nd)	Johnson, James (DNP)	Pittman, Craig (DNP)
1990	16th	Wetzel, Eric (DNP)	Sheldon, Shawn (5th)	Hall, Dennis (DNP)	Lee, Buddy (4th)	Seras, Andy (6th)	Morgan, Gordy (DNP)	Morgan, John (6th)	Foy, Michial (DNP)	Tironi, Chris (6th)	Ghaffari, Matt (6th)
1991	6th	Fuller, Mark (9th)	Sheldon, Shawn (2nd)	Famiano, Frank (DNP)	Anderson, Ike (DNP)	Seras, Andy (6th)	Butler, David (DNP)	Morgan, John (7th)	Couture, Randy (DNP)	Koslowski, Dennis (7th)	Ghaffari, Matt (2nd)
1992	10th	Fuller, Mark (11th)	Sheldon, Shawn (4th)	Hall, Dennis (8th)	Lee, Buddy (6th)	Smith, Rodney (3rd)	West, Travis (11th)	Henderson, Dan (10th)	Foy, Mike (6th)	Koslowski, Dennis (2nd)	Ghaffari, Matt (11th)
1993	21st	Wetzel, Eric (DNP)	Sheldon, Shawn (8th)	Hall, Dennis (9th)	Lewis, Shon (DNP)	Seras, Andy (DNP)	Morgan, Gordy (8th)	Morgan, Marty (DNP)	Couture, Randy (DNP)	Johnson, James (5th)	Ghaffari, Matt (DNP)
1994	9th	Maynard, Mujaahid (10th)	Sheldon, Shawn (16th)	Hall, Dennis (3rd)	Zuniga, David (4th)	Seras, Andy (10th)	Morgan, Gordy (14th)	Henderson, Dan (12th)	Foy, Michial (5th)	Johnson, James (15th)	Ghaffari, Matt (6th)
1995	5th	Maynard, Mujaahid (5th)	Sheldon, Shawn (5th)	Hall, Dennis (1st)	Zuniga, David (14th)	Sims, Heath (11th)	Morgan, Gordy (14th)	Morgan, Marty (13th)	Couture, Randy (16th)	Oostendorp, John (16th)	Ghaffari, Matt (3rd)
1996	9th	Maynard, Mujaahid (13th)	Paulson, Brandon (2nd)	Hall, Dennis (2nd)	Zuniga, David (10th)	Smith, Rodney (9th)	Morgan, Gordy (9th)	Henderson, Dan (12th)	Waldroup, Derrick (7th)	Gleasman, Jason (12th)	Ghaffari, Matt (2nd)

=== 1997–2001 ===
Year	Team	54 kg	58 kg	63 kg	69 kg	76 kg	85 kg	97 kg	130 kg
1997	18th	Lee, Broderick (18th)	Hall, Dennis (6th)	Zuniga, David (16th)	Saba, Chris (27th)	Lindland, Matt (17th)	Henderson, Dan (7th)	Couture, Randy (9th)	Gardner, Rulon (5th)
1998	8th	Sheldon, Shawn (14th)	Hall, Dennis (20th)	Bracken, Kevin (12th)	Saba, Chris (15th)	Lindland, Matt (6th)	Clark, Quincey (9th)	Klohs, Jason (18th)	Ghaffari, Matt (2nd)
1999	22nd	Mays, Steven (24th)	Hall, Dennis (28th)	Lewis, Shon (26th)	Zuniga, David (26th)	Lindland, Matt (24th)	Clark, Quincey (8th)	Klohs, Jason (7th)	Byers, Dremiel (6th)
2000	3rd	Mays, Steven (17th)	Gruenwald, Jim (6th)	Bracken, Kevin (6th)	Sims, Heath (12th)	Lindland, Matt (2nd)	Clark, Quincey (19th)	Lowney, Garrett (3rd)	Gardner, Rulon (1st)
2001	3rd	Paulson, Brandon (2nd)	Gruenwald, Jim (10th)	Bracken, Kevin (7th)	Cooper, Marcel (21st)	Sieracki, Keith (11th)	Lindland, Matt (2nd)	Loukides, Jason (30th)	Gardner, Rulon (1st)

=== 2002–2013 ===
Year	Team	55 kg	60 kg	66 kg	74 kg	84 kg	96 kg	120 kg
2002	5th	Paulson, Brandon (8th)	Gruenwald, Jim (8th)	Bracken, Kevin (14th)	Dantzler, T. C. (11th)	Vering, Brad (5th)	Lowney, Garrett (28th)	Byers, Dremiel (1st)
2003	16th	Paulson, Brandon (21st)	Gruenwald, Jim (4th)	Bracken, Kevin (17th)	Dantzler, T. C. (21st)	Vering, Brad (5th)	Ruiz, Justin (27th)	Gardner, Rulon (10th)
2004	14th	Hall, Dennis (14th)	Gruenwald, Jim (10th)	Wood, Oscar (12th)	Did not qualify	Vering, Brad (11th)	Lowney, Garrett (19th)	Gardner, Rulon (3rd)
2005	12th	Durlacher, Lindsey (18th)	Warren, Joe (9th)	Lester, Justin (24th)	Dantzler, T. C. (28th)	Vering, Brad (29th)	Ruiz, Justin (3rd)	Byers, Dremiel (13th)
2006	3rd	Durlacher, Lindsey (3rd)	Warren, Joe (1st)	Lester, Justin (3rd)	Dantzler, T. C. (5th)	Clark, Jake (12th)	Ruiz, Justin (12th)	Byers, Dremiel (9th)
2007	1st	Durlacher, Lindsey (5th)	Betterman, Joe (33rd)	Lester, Justin (3rd)	Dantzler, T. C. (22nd)	Vering, Brad (2nd)	Ruiz, Justin (13th)	Byers, Dremiel (3rd)
2008	16th	Mango, Spenser (9th)	Did not qualify	Deitchler, Jake (12th)	Dantzler, T. C. (16th)	Vering, Brad (12th)	Wheeler, Adam (3rd)	Byers, Dremiel (7th)
2009	12th	Mango, Spenser (9th)	Davis, Jeremiah (34th)	Sahin, Faruk (14th)	Lester, Justin (20th)	Betts, Chas (32nd)	Johnson, Raoul Christopher (23rd)	Byers, Dremiel (2nd)
2010	16th	Mango, Spenser (19th)	Davis, Jeremiah (17th)	Sahin, Faruk (11th)	Fisher, Jake (23rd)	Clark, Jake (11th)	Ruiz, Justin (5th)	Byers, Dremiel (5th)
2011	21st	Mango, Spenser (27th)	Betterman, Joe (38th)	Lester, Justin (5th)	Bisek, Andy (20th)	Haight, Cheney (26th)	Ruiz, Justin (20th)	Byers, Dremiel (24th)
2012	19th	Mango, Spenser (9th)	Coleman, Ellis (14th)	Lester, Justin (8th)	Provisor, Ben (11th)	Betts, Chas (9th)	Johnson, Raul Christopher (DNQ)	Byers, Dremiel (9th)
2013	10th	Mango, Spenser (5th)	Thielke, Jesse (8th)	Coleman, Ellis (25th)	Bisek, Andy (17th)	Holm, Jordan (15th)	Williams, Caylor (30th)	Smith, Robby (5th)

=== 2014–2017 ===
Year	Team	59 kg	66 kg	71 kg	75 kg	80 kg	85 kg	98 kg	125 kg
2014	12th	Mango, Spenser (5th)	Saddoris, Bryce (17th)	Lester, Justin (18th)	Bisek, Andy (3rd)	Rau, Joe (29th)	Holm, Jordan (29th)	Williams, Caylor (25th)	Smith, Robby (9th)
2015	11th	Mango, Spenser (13th)	Saddoris, Bryce (9th)	Lester, Justin (9th)	Bisek, Andy (3rd)	Martinez, Patrick (9th)	Holm, Jordan (27th)	Williams, Caylor (15th)	Smith, Robby (3rd)
2016	N/A	Thielke, Jesse (9th)	Perkins, RaVaughan (DNQ)	Gonzalez, Matthew^ (10th)	Bisek, Andy (12th)	Martinez, Patrick^ (26th)	Provisor, Ben (12th)	Rau, Joe (DNQ)	Smith, Robby (12th)
2017	31st	Hafizov, Ildar (19th)	Coleman, Ellis (12th)	Smith, Patrick (15th)	Manville, Mason (16th)	Haight, Cheney (26th)	Provisor, Ben (21st)	Hancock, G'Angelo (13th)	Smith, Robby (10th)

^: 71 kg and 80 kg were non-Olympic weights and were therefore wrestled at the 2016 World Wrestling Championships.

=== 2018– ===
Year	Team	55 kg	60 kg	63 kg	67 kg	72 kg	77 kg	82 kg	87 kg	97 kg	130 kg
2018	17th	Hazewinkel, Sam (18th)	Roberts, Dalton (31st)	Thielke, Jesse (14th)	Coleman, Ellis (11th)	Perkins, Ravaughn (17th)	Bey, Kamal (8th)	Speiller, Geordan (24th)	Martinez, Patrick (25th)	Hancock, G'Angelo (23rd)	Coon, Adam (2nd)
2019	20th	Nowry, Max (5th)	Hafizov, Ildar (16th)	Mango, Ryan (7th)	Coleman, Ellis (16th)	Bunker III, Raymond (12th)	Smith, Patrick (23rd)	Stefanowicz, John (23rd)	Rau, Joe (16th)	Hancock, G'Angelo (15th)	Coon, Adam (21st)
2020	N/A	Non-Olympic Weight	Hafizov, Ildar (12th)	Non-Olympic Weight	Sancho, Alejandro (10th)	Non-Olympic Weight	Porter, Jesse (DNQ)	Non-Olympic Weight	Stefanowicz, John (12th)	Hancock, G'Angelo (7th)	Coon, Adam (DNQ)
2021	18th	Nowry, Max (9th)	Roberts, Dalton (12th)	Jones, Sammy (17th)	Omania, Peyton (26th)	Smith, Patrick (19th)	Porter, Jesse (23rd)	Provisor, Ben (14th)	Garcia, Alan (23rd)	Hancock, G'Angelo (3rd)	Schultz, Cohlton (14th)
2022	21st	Nowry, Max (5th)	Hafizov, Ildar (10th)	Jones, Sammy (23rd)	Sancho, Alejandro (11th)	Peak, Benjamin (22nd)	Bey, Kamal (31st)	Woods, Spencer (22nd)	Garcia, Alan (18th)	Amos, Braxton (10th)	Schultz, Cohlton (7th)
2023	22nd	Koontz, Brady (10th)	Hafizov, Ildar (33rd)	Johnson, Xavier (10th)	Sancho, Alejandro (12th)	Smith, Patrick (8th)	Bey, Kamal (10th)	Woods, Spencer (18th)	Braunagel, Zac (17th)	Rau, Joe (19th)	Schultz, Cohlton (10th)
2024	N/A	Koontz, Brady^ (11th)	Roberts, Dalton (DNQ)	Hafizov, Ildar^ (17th)	Coleman, Ellis (DNQ)	Peak, Benji^ (13th)	Bey, Kamal (11th)	Kikiiniou, Aliaksandr^ (21st)	Jacobson, Payton (15th)	Rau, Joe (9th)	Coon, Adam (12th)
2025	18th	Raney, Jayden (7th)	Black, Max (13th)	Coleman, Ellis (11th)	Nutter, Alston (33rd)	Sancho, Alejandro (22nd)	Bey, Kamal (10th)	Melelashvili, Beka (19th)	Jacobson, Payton (7th)	Foy Jr., Michial (16th)	Schultz, Cohlton (16th)
2026	31st	Nowry, Max (11th)	Roberts, Dalton (20th)	Johnson, Xavier (22nd)	Black, Otto (10th)	Peak, Benji (11th)	Adams, Joel (23rd)	Bey, Kamal (19th)	Melelashvili, Beka (25th)	Young, Timothy (16th)	Schultz, Cohlton (17th)

^: 55 kg, 63 kg, 72 kg and 82 kg were non-Olympic weights and were therefore wrestled at the 2024 World Wrestling Championships.

== Multiple-time gold medalists ==
The table below shows American wrestlers who have won at least two gold medals at the World Championships or Olympic Games in Greco-Roman wrestling.

Rank	Wrestler	Weights	From	To	Gold	Silver	Bronze	Total
1	Rulon Gardner	120 kg / 130 kg	2000	2004	2	-	1	3

== See also ==
- USA Wrestling
- Wrestling in the United States
- United States results in men's freestyle wrestling
- United States results in women's freestyle wrestling
- List of World and Olympic Champions in Greco-Roman wrestling
