= Wrestling at the 1976 Summer Olympics – Men's Greco-Roman 90 kg =

Men's Greco-Roman 90 kg at the Games of the XXI Olympiad
- Venue: Maurice Richard Arena
- Dates: 20–24 July 1976
- Competitors: 13 from 13 nations

Medalists
1st place, gold medalist(s)		Valery Rezantsev	Soviet Union
2nd place, silver medalist(s)		Stoyan Ivanov	Bulgaria
3rd place, bronze medalist(s)		Czesław Kwieciński	Poland

The Men's Greco-Roman 90 kg at the 1976 Summer Olympics was an event held as part of the wrestling program. The competition took place from July 20 to July 24 at the Maurice Richard Arena in Montreal, Canada. A total of 13 wrestlers from 13 nations competed in the event.

The gold medal was won by Valery Rezantsev of the Soviet Union. Stoyan Ivanov of Bulgaria won the silver medal, and Czesław Kwieciński of Poland took the bronze.

== Medalists ==
Gold	Valery Rezantsev; Soviet Union
Silver	Stoyan Ivanov; Bulgaria
Bronze	Czesław Kwieciński; Poland

== Tournament results ==
The competition used a form of negative points tournament, with negative points given for any result short of a fall. Accumulation of 6 negative points eliminated the loser wrestler. When only three wrestlers remain, a special final round is used to determine the order of the medals.

Legend

- TF — Won by Fall
- IN — Won by Opponent Injury
- DQ — Won by Passivity
- D1 — Won by Passivity, the winner is passive too
- D2 — Both wrestlers lost by Passivity
- FF — Won by Forfeit
- DNA — Did not appear
- TPP — Total penalty points
- MPP — Match penalty points

Penalties

- 0 — Won by Fall, Technical Superiority, Passivity, Injury and Forfeit
- 0.5 — Won by Points, 8-11 points difference
- 1 — Won by Points, 1-7 points difference
- 2 — Won by Passivity, the winner is passive too
- 3 — Lost by Points, 1-7 points difference
- 3.5 — Lost by Points, 8-11 points difference
- 4 — Lost by Fall, Technical Superiority, Passivity, Injury and Forfeit

=== Round 1 ===
TPP	MPP		Score		MPP	TPP
0	0	Sadao Sato (JPN)	TF / 2:00	Fred Theobald (FRG)	4	4
4	4	Michel Grangier (FRA)	DQ / 7:54	Valery Rezantsev (URS)	0	0
3	3	Petre Dicu (ROU)	2 - 7	István Séllyei (HUN)	1	1
3	3	Darko Nišavić (YUG)	3 - 10	Stoyan Ivanov (BUL)	1	1
0	0	James Johnson (USA)	TF / 1:20	Ambroise Sarr (SEN)	4	4
0	0	Frank Andersson (SWE)	25 - 9	Hashem Kolahi (IRI)	4	4
0		Czesław Kwieciński (POL)		Bye		

=== Round 2 ===
TPP	MPP		Score		MPP	TPP
0	0	Czesław Kwieciński (POL)	TF / 2:00	Sadao Sato (JPN)	4	4
5	1	Fred Theobald (FRG)	11 - 4	Michel Grangier (FRA)	3	7
0	0	Valery Rezantsev (URS)	TF / 2:51	Petre Dicu (ROU)	4	7
4	3	István Séllyei (HUN)	2 - 4	Darko Nišavić (YUG)	1	4
1	0	Stoyan Ivanov (BUL)	TF / 8:02	James Johnson (USA)	4	4
8	4	Ambroise Sarr (SEN)	TF / 1:32	Frank Andersson (SWE)	0	0
4		Hashem Kolahi (IRI)		Bye		

=== Round 3 ===
TPP	MPP		Score		MPP	TPP
8	4	Hashem Kolahi (IRI)	TF / 0:12	Czesław Kwieciński (POL)	0	0
8	4	Sadao Sato (JPN)	TF / 3:55	Valery Rezantsev (URS)	0	0
9	4	Fred Theobald (FRG)	DQ / 5:06	István Séllyei (HUN)	0	4
4	0	Darko Nišavić (YUG)	DQ / 7:28	James Johnson (USA)	4	8
2	1	Stoyan Ivanov (BUL)	10 - 4	Frank Andersson (SWE)	3	3

=== Round 4 ===
TPP	MPP		Score		MPP	TPP
3	3	Czesław Kwieciński (POL)	3 - 9	Valery Rezantsev (URS)	1	1
8	4	István Séllyei (HUN)	DQ / 4:55	Stoyan Ivanov (BUL)	0	2
5	1	Darko Nišavić (YUG)	3 - 2	Frank Andersson (SWE)	3	6

=== Round 5 ===
TPP	MPP		Score		MPP	TPP
3	0	Czesław Kwieciński (POL)	DQ / 8:00	Darko Nišavić (YUG)	4	9
2	1	Valery Rezantsev (URS)	6 - 6	Stoyan Ivanov (BUL)	3	5

=== Final ===
Results from the preliminary round are carried forward into the final (shown in yellow).

TPP	MPP		Score		MPP	TPP
	3	Czesław Kwieciński (POL)	3 - 9	Valeri Rezantsev (URS)	1	
2	1	Valery Rezantsev (URS)	6 - 6	Stoyan Ivanov (BUL)	3	
5	2	Stoyan Ivanov (BUL)	D1 / 6:46	Czesław Kwieciński (POL)	4	7

== Final standings ==
1. Valery Rezantsev (URS)
2. Stoyan Ivanov (BUL)
3. Czesław Kwieciński (POL)
4. Darko Nišavić (YUG)
5. Frank Andersson (SWE)
6. István Séllyei (HUN)
7. Sadao Sato (JPN) and James Johnson (USA)
