= Wrestling at the 1975 Pan American Games =

Wrestling at the Pan American Games

This page shows the results of the Men's Wrestling Competition at the 1975 Pan American Games, held from October 12 to October 26, 1971, in Mexico City, Mexico.

== Men's freestyle ==
=== Freestyle (– 48 kg) ===
Rank	Name
Gold medal	Jorge Frias (MEX)
Silver medal	David Cowan (USA)
Bronze medal	Miguel Alonso (CUB)

=== Freestyle (– 52 kg) ===
Rank	Name
Gold medal	Eloy Abreu (CUB)
Silver medal	James Haines (USA)
Bronze medal	Julio Gómez (MEX)

=== Freestyle (– 57 kg) ===
Rank	Name
Gold medal	Jorge Ramos (CUB)
Silver medal	Moisés López (MEX)
Bronze medal	Mark Massery (USA)

=== Freestyle (– 62 kg) ===
Rank	Name
Gold medal	Egon Beiler (CAN)
Silver medal	José Ramos (CUB)
Bronze medal	James Humphrey (USA)

=== Freestyle (– 68 kg) ===
Rank	Name
Gold medal	Lloyd Keaser (USA)
Silver medal	Clive Lewellyn (CAN)
Bronze medal	Daniel Pozo (CUB)

=== Freestyle (– 74 kg) ===
Rank	Name
Gold medal	Francisco Lebeque (CUB)
Silver medal	Carl Adams (USA)
Bronze medal	James Miller (CAN)

=== Freestyle (– 82 kg) ===
Rank	Name
Gold medal	George Hicks (USA)
Silver medal	Richard Deschatelets (CAN)
Bronze medal	Fernando Goldschmied (MEX)

=== Freestyle (– 90 kg) ===
Rank	Name
Gold medal	Benjamin Patterson (USA)
Silver medal	Bárbaro Morgan (CUB)
Bronze medal	Terry Paice (CAN)

=== Freestyle (– 100 kg) ===
Rank	Name
Gold medal	Russell Hellickson (USA)
Silver medal	Lupe Lara (CUB)
Bronze medal	Claude Pilon (CAN)

=== Freestyle (+ 100 kg) ===
Rank	Name
Gold medal	Michael McCready (USA)
Silver medal	Lázaro Morales (CUB)
Bronze medal	Carlos Braconi (ARG)

== Men's Greco-Roman ==
=== Greco-Roman (– 48 kg) ===
Rank	Name
Gold medal	Silvano Valdés (CUB)
Silver medal	Karoly Kancsar (USA)
Bronze medal	Alfredo Olvera (MEX)

=== Greco-Roman (– 52 kg) ===
Rank	Name
Gold medal	Bruce Thompson (USA)
Silver medal	Enrique Jiménez (MEX)
Bronze medal	Raúl Trujillo (CUB)

=== Greco-Roman (– 57 kg) ===
Rank	Name
Gold medal	Daniel Mello (USA)
Silver medal	Leonel Pérez (CUB)
Bronze medal	Alfredo López (MEX)

=== Greco-Roman (– 62 kg) ===
Rank	Name
Gold medal	Howard Stupp (CAN)
Silver medal	Gary Alexander (USA)
Bronze medal	Julio Gutierrez (MEX)

=== Greco-Roman (– 68 kg) ===
Rank	Name
Gold medal	Patrick Marcy (USA)
Silver medal	Erasmo Estrada (CUB)
Bronze medal	John McPhedron (CAN)

=== Greco-Roman (– 74 kg) ===
Rank	Name
Gold medal	Idalberto Barban (CUB)
Silver medal	Michael Jones (USA)
Bronze medal	Segundo Olmedo (PAN)

=== Greco-Roman (– 82 kg) ===
Rank	Name
Gold medal	Daniel Chandler (USA)
Silver medal	René Vidal (CUB)
Bronze medal	Juan Flores (MEX)

=== Greco-Roman (– 90 kg) ===
Rank	Name
Gold medal	Willie Williams (USA)
Silver medal	Bárbaro Morgan (CUB)
Bronze medal	Javier Serrano (MEX)

=== Greco-Roman (– 100 kg) ===
Rank	Name
Gold medal	Brad Rheingans (USA)
Silver medal	Daniel Vernik (ARG)
Bronze medal	Lupe Lara (CUB)

=== Greco-Roman (+ 100 kg) ===
Rank	Name
Gold medal	William van Worth (USA)
Silver medal	Francisco Lonchán (CUB)
Bronze medal	Harry Geris (CAN)

== Medal table ==
Rank	Nation	Gold	Silver	Bronze	Total
1	United States	12	6	2	20
2	Cuba	5	9	4	18
3	Canada	2	2	5	9
4	Mexico	1	2	7	10
5	Argentina	0	1	1	2
6	Panama	0	0	1	1
Totals (6 entries)		20	20	20	60

== See also ==
- Wrestling at the 1976 Summer Olympics
