= Wrestling at the 1980 Summer Olympics – Men's Greco-Roman 90 kg =

Men's Greco-Roman 90 kg at the Games of the XXII Olympiad
- Venue: Central Sports Club of the Army
- Dates: 20–22 July 1980
- Competitors: 15 from 15 nations

Medalists
| 1st place, gold medalist(s) | | Norbert Növényi | Hungary |
| 2nd place, silver medalist(s) | | Igor Kanygin | Soviet Union |
| 3rd place, bronze medalist(s) | | Petre Dicu | Romania |

The men's Greco-Roman 90 kg at the 1980 Summer Olympics as part of the wrestling program were held at the Athletics Fieldhouse, Central Sports Club of the Army.

== Medalists ==
| Gold | Norbert Növényi; Hungary |
| Silver | Igor Kanygin; Soviet Union |
| Bronze | Petre Dicu; Romania |

== Tournament results ==
The competition used a form of negative points tournament, with negative points given for any result short of a fall. Accumulation of 6 negative points eliminated the loser wrestler. When only three wrestlers remain, a special final round is used to determine the order of the medals.

Legend

- TF — Won by Fall
- IN — Won by Opponent Injury
- DQ — Won by Passivity
- D1 — Won by Passivity, the winner is passive too
- D2 — Both wrestlers lost by Passivity
- FF — Won by Forfeit
- DNA — Did not appear
- TPP — Total penalty points
- MPP — Match penalty points

Penalties

- 0 — Won by Fall, Technical Superiority, Passivity, Injury and Forfeit
- 0.5 — Won by Points, 8-11 points difference
- 1 — Won by Points, 1-7 points difference
- 2 — Won by Passivity, the winner is passive too
- 3 — Lost by Points, 1-7 points difference
- 3.5 — Lost by Points, 8-11 points difference
- 4 — Lost by Fall, Technical Superiority, Passivity, Injury and Forfeit

=== Round 1 ===
| TPP | MPP | | Score | | MPP | TPP |
|---|---|---|---|---|---|---|
| 4 | 4 | Keijo Manni (FIN) | TF / 2:22 | Norbert Növényi (HUN) | 0 | 0 |
| 4 | 4 | Atef Mahayri (SYR) | TF / 5:39 | Thomas Horschel (GDR) | 0 | 0 |
| 3 | 3 | Georgios Pozidis (GRE) | 13 - 16 | Frank Andersson (SWE) | 1 | 1 |
| 0.5 | 0.5 | Czesław Kwieciński (POL) | 11 - 3 | Jamtsyn Bor (MGL) | 3.5 | 3.5 |
| 4 | 4 | Franz Pitschmann (AUT) | DQ / 7:50 | Petre Dicu (ROU) | 0 | 0 |
| 0 | 0 | Igor Kanygin (URS) | DQ / 7:09 | Stoyan Ivanov (BUL) | 4 | 4 |
| 2 | 2 | Darko Nišavić (YUG) | D1 / 4:38 | José Poll (CUB) | 4 | 4 |
| 0 | | Christophe Andanson (FRA) | | Bye | | |

=== Round 2 ===
| TPP | MPP | | Score | | MPP | TPP |
|---|---|---|---|---|---|---|
| 3 | 3 | Christophe Andanson (FRA) | 9 - 15 | Keijo Manni (FIN) | 1 | 5 |
| 0 | 0 | Norbert Növényi (HUN) | TF / 2:38 | Atef Mahayri (SYR) | 4 | 8 |
| 4 | 4 | Thomas Horschel (GDR) | TF / 1:10 | Georgios Pozidis (GRE) | 0 | 3 |
| 1 | 0 | Frank Andersson (SWE) | 19 - 0 | Czesław Kwieciński (POL) | 4 | 4.5 |
| 7.5 | 4 | Jamtsyn Bor (MGL) | TF / 5:53 | Franz Pitschmann (AUT) | 0 | 4 |
| 4 | 4 | Petre Dicu (ROU) | D1 / 6:50 | Igor Kanygin (URS) | 2 | 2 |
| 4 | 0 | Stoyan Ivanov (BUL) | DQ / 4:58 | Darko Nišavić (YUG) | 4 | 6 |
| 4 | | José Poll (CUB) | | Bye | | |

=== Round 3 ===
| TPP | MPP | | Score | | MPP | TPP |
|---|---|---|---|---|---|---|
| 4.5 | 0.5 | José Poll (CUB) | 9 - 1 | Christophe Andanson (FRA) | 3.5 | 6.5 |
| 9 | 4 | Keijo Manni (FIN) | TF / 4:46 | Thomas Horschel (GDR) | 0 | 4 |
| 0 | 0 | Norbert Növényi (HUN) | TF / 5:25 | Georgios Pozidis (GRE) | 4 | 7 |
| 1 | 0 | Frank Andersson (SWE) | TF / 1:45 | Franz Pitschmann (AUT) | 4 | 8 |
| 8 | 3.5 | Czesław Kwieciński (POL) | 2 - 10 | Igor Kanygin (URS) | 0.5 | 2.5 |
| 5 | 1 | Petre Dicu (ROU) | 6 - 2 | Stoyan Ivanov (BUL) | 3 | 7 |

=== Round 4 ===
| TPP | MPP | | Score | | MPP | TPP |
|---|---|---|---|---|---|---|
| 8.5 | 4 | José Poll (CUB) | TF / 5:57 | Norbert Növényi (HUN) | 0 | 0 |
| 8 | 4 | Thomas Horschel (GDR) | TF / 5:29 | Petre Dicu (ROU) | 0 | 5 |
| 4 | 3 | Frank Andersson (SWE) | 5 - 7 | Igor Kanygin (URS) | 1 | 3.5 |

=== Round 5 ===
| TPP | MPP | | Score | | MPP | TPP |
|---|---|---|---|---|---|---|
| 1 | 1 | Norbert Növényi (HUN) | 7 - 6 | Igor Kanygin (URS) | 3 | 6.5 |
| 7 | 3 | Frank Andersson (SWE) | 2 - 3 | Petre Dicu (ROU) | 1 | 6 |

=== Final ===
Results from the preliminary round are carried forward into the final (shown in yellow).

| TPP | MPP | | Score | | MPP | TPP |
|---|---|---|---|---|---|---|
| | 4 | Petre Dicu (ROU) | D1 / 6:50 | Igor Kanygin (URS) | 2 | |
| | 1 | Norbert Növényi (HUN) | 7 - 6 | Igor Kanygin (URS) | 3 | 5 |
| 2 | 1 | Norbert Növényi (HUN) | 4 - 1 | Petre Dicu (ROU) | 3 | 7 |

== Final standings ==
1. Norbert Növényi (HUN)
2. Igor Kanygin (URS)
3. Petre Dicu (ROU)
4. Frank Andersson (SWE)
5. Thomas Horschel (GDR)
6. José Poll (CUB)
7. Christophe Andanson (FRA)
8. Georgios Pozidis (GRE)
