= Dustin Schlatter =

American folkstyle wrestler (born 1986)

Personal information
- Born: May 15, 1986 (age 40) Westerville, Ohio, U.S.

Sport
- Country: United States
- Sport: Wrestling
- Events: Freestyle and Folkstyle
- College team: Minnesota
- Club: Minnesota Storm
- Team: USA
Medal record
Men's freestyle wrestling
Representing the United States
Pan American Championships
Gold medal – first place	2015 Santiago de Chile	70 kg
Aleksandr Medved Prizes
Bronze medal – third place	2011 Minsk	74 kg
Men's collegiate wrestling
Representing the Minnesota Golden Gophers
NCAA Division I Championships
Gold medal – first place	2006 Oklahoma City	149 lb
Bronze medal – third place	2007 Auburn Hills	149 lb

Dustin Schlatter is an American former wrestler. He won the 2006 NCAA wrestling title and was a three-time NCAA All-American at 149 pounds for the University of Minnesota. As a high school wrestler, Schlatter was a NHSCA Senior national title, USA Wrestling Junior and Cadet national titles in freestyle and Greco-Roman wrestling, and was a four-time Ohio high school state champion. He represented the United States in freestyle wrestling at the 2009 World Championships at 74 kg.

== High School ==
Schlatter attended Perry High School in Perry Township, Ohio during his junior and senior years (from 2003 to 2005), and Graham High School in St. Paris, Ohio during his freshman and sophomore years (from 2001 to 2003) where he compiled a 154-4 overall record. He also won four OHSAA state championships (two in Division 1 and two in Division 2) and the 145 pound NHSCA Senior National wrestling championship in 2005. Dustin was also a two-time champion of the Beast of the East tournament. He was undefeated at the USA Wrestling Freestyle and Greco-Roman National Championships in Fargo, North Dakota, where he won the Junior National Freestyle championship at the 135 pound weight class in 2003.

In Dustin's senior year, he twice met Brent Metcalf, who was considered the #2 wrestler in the nation behind Schlatter that year. Metcalf won the first match, 4-3 on a rideout in double overtime, at the Medina Invitational Tournament in Medina, Ohio, while Schlatter won the rematch, 4-3, at the NHSCA Senior National Tournament in Cleveland for the national championship and thus reclaimed the #1 ranking.

== College ==
=== Freshman season (2005-06) ===
Competing for the University of Minnesota, Schlatter won the 2006 149-pound NCAA Division I wrestling championship as a true freshman by defeating Tyler Eustice of the University of Iowa by a score of 4-0, giving him his first All-American honor. Schlatter also was the Big Ten Conference champion at 149 pounds defeating Illinois redshirt freshman Troy Tirapelle (who had defeated Eustice) 14-1 in the championship bout. In his freshman campaign, Schlatter twice defeated senior Zack Esposito of Oklahoma State University, the defending 149-pound NCAA Division I champion, once by a major decision. He finished the regular season with a record of 42-1, the lone loss to Mark DiSalvo of Central Michigan. Schlatter later avenged this loss.

=== Sophomore season (2006-07) ===
Schlatter finished 3rd in the NCAA Championships and finished the season with a 37-1 record. After accumulating 65 consecutive wins dating back to the 2006 season, Schlatter was upset in the semi-finals of the 149 weight class by Gregor Gillespie of Edinboro. Schlatter rebounded with two more wins to take the third-place trophy. Previous to this, Schlatter won his second consecutive Big Ten individual title.

=== Junior Season (2007-08) ===
Schlatter finished his junior season with a 21-5 record and his third All-American finish at the NCAA Tournament while competing at 149 pounds. He suffered a mid-season injury which kept him out of the Minnesota lineup for an extended period of time. Upon returning he made the Big 10 Tournament finals for the third time in three attempts. Schlatter's Big 10 championship match was against Iowa's top-ranked Brent Metcalf. Metcalf won the match by a 5-3 decision.

=== Redshirt Year (2008-09) ===
Dustin took a redshirt year to train in freestyle. He also redshirted to recover, stating in interviews "I was hurt, sprained knee, sprained ankle, hamstring. I needed to give my body a rest."

He qualified for his first World Team (at 74 kg / 163 lbs.) by defeating top seeded Travis Paulson (1-0, 1-0) (1-0, 1-0). He won the ball toss each time and won each leg clinch. He competed in the World Freestyle Championships in Herning, Denmark on September. 23, 2009. He lost his first round match to Ramash Kumar of India. The match went a full three periods before it was decided, with scores of 1-0, 2-2, and 1-1. (Kumar would go on to win the bronze medal after making it to the semi-finals.)

=== Senior Season (2009-10) ===
Dustin started off the season ranked #1 at 165 lbs by intermatwrestle.com. He was 8-1 on the season. His lone loss by a score of 3-2 came from Redshirt Freshman Alex Meade of Oklahoma State. He dropped to #4 in the rankings but rebounded by winning the Southern Scuffle defeating Ricky Schmulyen of Bloomsburg in the finals. He also defeated #3 John Reader of Iowa State and moved up to #2 in the rankings at 165 lbs. On January 28, Minnesota head coach Jay Robinson issued a press release stating Dustin Schlatter will be dropping to the 157 lb weight class. Robinson had conferred with the coaching staff at Minnesota and asked Dustin to move down. He said he would do whatever was best for the team. The coaching staff said they made this decision after Olympian Freshman Jake Deitchler was ruled ineligible for the season. Schlatter was originally planning on going 157 lbs for the 2009-2010 season but moved up to make room in the lineup for Deitchler and to increase Minnesota's chances for success.

After a leg injury put Dustin off the mat for the latter part of the 09-10 season, he attempted to make a comeback in the NCAA tournament. Schlatter's injury defaulted from the competition after his leg was hurt further during a first round sprawl.

== Personal ==
Schlatter is a native of Westerville, Ohio where he was born to Pat and Joyce Schlatter. He has one brother, C.P., who was also a four-time Ohio high school wrestling state champion.
