= Charlie Coffey (disambiguation) =

Charlie Coffey (1934–2015) was an American college football player and coach.

Charles or Charlie Coffey or Coffee may also refer to:

- Charlie Coffey (writer), American writer, actor and producer
- Charles Coffey (died 1745), Irish playwright and composer
- Charles Coffee, see United States results in Greco-Roman wrestling
- Shelby Coffey III (Charles Shelby Coffey III), American journalist and editor
