= Minnesota Golden Gophers wrestling =

Wrestling team of the University of Minnesota

- University: University of Minnesota
- Head coach: Brandon Eggum (11th season)
- Conference: Big Ten
- Location: Minneapolis, MN
- Arena: Maturi Pavilion (capacity: 5,700)
- Nickname: Gophers
- Colors: Maroon and gold

Team national championships
- 3

National championship years
- 2001, 2002, 2007

NCAA individual champions
- 25 (by 19 athletes)

All-Americans
- 195 (by 100 athletes)

Conference championships
- 94 (by 61 athletes)

Conference Tournament championships
- Big Ten: 1913, 1941, 1957, 1959, 1999, 2001, 2002, 2003, 2006, 2007

The Minnesota Golden Gophers wrestling program is an intercollegiate varsity sport at the University of Minnesota. They are a member of the Big Ten Conference and NCAA. The Gophers have won the NCAA Division I Wrestling Championship team title three times, in 2001, 2002, and 2007.

== History ==
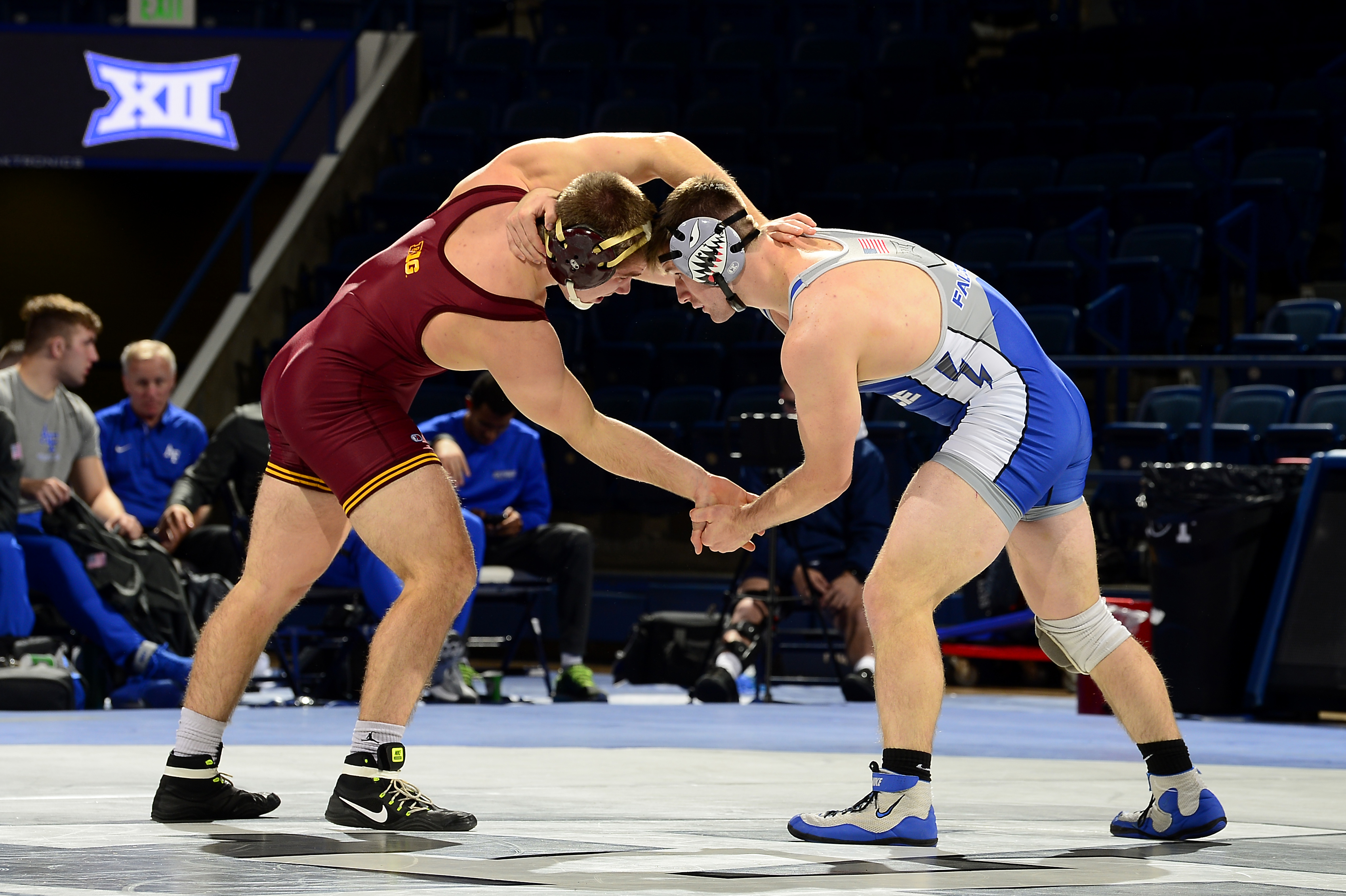
A Golden Gophers wrestler grapples with an Air Force opponent during a match in 2018

Wrestling began at the University of Minnesota in 1910, but the first formal dual meet was not until 1921, when coach Frank Gilman led the team to a victory over Wisconsin.

J Robinson served as head coach for the team for thirty years, from 1986 to 2016. He led the Golden Gophers to three NCAA Division I national championships during his tenure, winning in 2001, 2002, and 2007. Robinson's tenure ended in 2016, when he was fired over his handling of a prescription drug scandal involving his wrestlers. Robinson's career record at Minnesota was 437-134-4.

On January 26, 2017, three-time Golden Gopher All-American Brandon Eggum was named as the programs head coach. Eggum has been on the Minnesota wrestling coaching staff since the 2000–2001 season.

== Home meets ==
Home meets are held in the 5,700-seat Maturi Pavilion in Minneapolis. When large crowds are expected, meets are held in Williams Arena, which has a capacity of 14,625. This often happens for matches against archrivals Iowa and Oklahoma State. Several home matches each year are televised by the Big Ten Network. The school has also used Target Center in downtown Minneapolis for some matches.

== Team championships ==
- NCAA Division I: 2001, 2002, 2007
- Big Ten Conference: 1913, 1941, 1957, 1959, 1999, 2001, 2002, 2003, 2006, 2007

The 2001 national championship team has two unique distinctions: all ten wrestlers in each weight class earned All-American (top eight) honors and the school won the national team championship despite not having a single finalist.

== NCAA individual champions ==
The Gophers have had nineteen NCAA individual champions. Six of those were two-time champions.

- John Whitaker: 1937
- Dale Hanson: 1939 (Most Valuable Wrestler)
- Leonard Levy: 1941
- Verne Gagne: 1948, 1949
- Dick Mueller: 1953
- Evan Johnson: 1976
- Pat Neu: 1977
- Marty Morgan: 1991
- Tim Hartung: 1998, 1999
- Brock Lesnar: 2000
- Luke Becker: 2002
- Jared Lawrence: 2002
- Damion Hahn: 2003, 2004
- Dustin Schlatter: 2006
- Cole Konrad: 2006, 2007
- Jayson Ness: 2010
- Tony Nelson: 2012, 2013
- Gable Steveson: 2021, 2022
- Max McEnelly: 2026

== Dan Hodge Trophy ==
- 2010: Jayson Ness
- 2021: Gable Steveson
- 2022: Gable Steveson

== Olympians ==
Minnesota wrestlers in the Olympics
Year	Name	Country	Style	Weight Class	Place
1948 London	Verne Gagne	United States	Freestyle	87 kg	ALT
1956 Melbourne	Alan Rice	United States	Greco-Roman	62 kg	DNP
1976 Montreal	Gary Alexander	United States	Greco-Roman	62 kg	DNP
1976 Montreal	James "Evan" Johnson	United States	Greco-Roman	90 kg	7th
1976 Montreal	Dan Chandler	United States	Greco-Roman	82 kg	DNP
1980 Moscow	Dan Chandler	United States	Greco-Roman	82 kg	Boycott
1984 Los Angeles	Dan Chandler	United States	Greco-Roman	82 kg	DNP
1984 Los Angeles	Jim Martinez	United States	Greco-Roman	68 kg	Bronze
1988 Seoul	Evan Bernstein	Israel	Greco-Roman	90 kg	DNP
1996 Atlanta	Brandon Paulson	United States	Greco-Roman	52 kg	Silver
1996 Atlanta	Gordy Morgan	United States	Greco-Roman	74 kg	9th
1996 Atlanta	David Zuniga	United States	Greco-Roman	62 kg	10th
2000 Sydney	Garrett Lowney	United States	Greco-Roman	97 kg	Bronze
2004 Athens	Garrett Lowney	United States	Greco-Roman	96 kg	19th
2008 Beijing	Jake Deitchler	United States	Greco-Roman	66 kg	12th
2020 Tokyo	Gable Steveson	United States	Freestyle	125 kg	Gold

== Notable Minnesota wrestlers ==
- Gary Alexander – Olympian in Greco-Roman wrestling at 1976 Summer Olympics
- Evan Bernstein – Olympian in Greco-Roman wrestling at 1988 Summer Olympics
- Norman Borlaug – Wrestled for the Golden Gophers in the 1930s; went on to be recognized as the "Father of the Green Revolution" and Nobel Peace Prize laureate
- Dan Chandler – Olympian in Greco-Roman wrestling at 1976, 1980, and 1984 Summer Olympics
- Jake Deitchler – Olympian in Greco-Roman wrestling at 2008 Summer Olympics
- Verne Gagne – two-time NCAA Champion and Olympic freestyle wrestling alternate at 1948 Summer Olympics
- James "Evan" Johnson – Olympian in Greco-Roman wrestling at 1976 Summer Olympics, NCAA Champion and two-time finalist
- Cole Konrad – MMA fighter, first Bellator Heavyweight World Champion, two-time NCAA Champion and three-time finalist
- Nik Lentz – UFC fighter
- Brock Lesnar – UFC Heavyweight Champion, professional wrestler, NCAA Champion and two-time finalist
- Leonard Levy – NFL player, professional wrestler, NCAA Champion
- Garrett Lowney – Olympic bronze medalist in Greco-Roman wrestling at 2000 Summer Olympics
- James Martinez – Olympic bronze medalist in Greco-Roman wrestling at 1984 Summer Olympics, NCAA All-American
- Gordy Morgan – Olympian in Greco-Roman wrestling at 1996 Summer Olympics, NCAA All-American
- Marty Morgan – NCAA Champion and three-time All-American at Minnesota
- Brandon Paulson – Olympic silver medalist in Greco-Roman wrestling at 1996 Summer Olympics, NCAA All-American
- Alan Rice – Olympian in Greco-Roman wrestling at 1956 Summer Olympics
- Dustin Schlatter – NCAA Champion and three-time All-American
- Gable Steveson – Olympic gold medalist in freestyle wrestling at 2020 Summer Olympics, professional wrestler, NFL player, two-time NCAA Champion and three-time All-American, two-time Hodge Trophy winner
- Jacob Volkmann – UFC fighter, three-time NCAA All-American
- David Zuniga – Olympian in Greco-Roman wrestling at 1996 Summer Olympics
