= Jamtsyn =

Jamtsyn (Mongolian: Жамцын) is a Mongolian masculine given name. Notable people with the name include:

- Jamtsyn Bor (born 1958), Mongolian wrestler
- Jamtsyn Davaajav (1953–2000), Mongolian wrestler
