= Samir Bouguerra =

Algerian Greco-Roman wrestler

Personal information
- Nationality: Algeria
- Born: 18 July 1982 (age 44)
- Height: 1.76 m (5 ft 9 1/2 in)
- Weight: 96 kg (212 lb)

Sport
- Sport: Wrestling
- Event: Greco-Roman
Medal record
Men's freestyle wrestling
Representing Algeria
All-Africa Games
Silver medal – second place	2007 Algiers	96 kg

Samir Bouguerra (Arabic: سمير بوقرة; born 18 July 1982) is an amateur Algerian Greco-Roman wrestler, who played for the men's heavyweight category. He won a silver medal for his division at the 2007 All-Africa Games in Algiers, losing out to Egyptian wrestler and defending Olympic champion Karam Gaber.

Bouguerra represented Algeria at the 2008 Summer Olympics in Beijing, where he competed for the men's 96 kg class. He received a bye for the preliminary round of sixteen match, before losing out to China's Jiang Huachen, who was able to score eight points in two straight periods, leaving Bouguerra without a single point.
