= José Poll =

Cuban wrestler (1950–2020)

Personal information
- Full name: José Poll Martínez
- Nationality: Cuban
- Born: 24 September 1950
- Died: April 2020 (aged 69)
- Height: 180 cm (5 ft 11 in)
- Weight: 90 kg (198 lb)

Sport
- Sport: Wrestling
Medal record
Representing Cuba
Pan American Games
Men's Greco-Roman wrestling
Gold medal – first place	1979 San Juan	90 kg
Men's Freestyle Wrestling
Silver medal – second place	1979 San Juan	90 kg

José Poll Martínez (24 September 1950 – April 2020) was a Cuban wrestler. He competed in the men's Greco-Roman 90 kg at the 1980 Summer Olympics.
