= Oleg Kryoka =

Ukrainian Greco-Roman wrestler

Personal information
- Full name: Oleh Olegovych Kroka
- Nationality: Ukraine
- Born: 17 January 1987 (age 39) Dnipropetrovsk, Ukrainian SSR, Soviet Union
- Height: 1.87 m (6 ft 1 1/2 in)
- Weight: 96 kg (212 lb)

Sport
- Sport: Wrestling
- Event: Greco-Roman
- Club: ZS Zaporizhzhia
- Coached by: Evgeniy Chertkov

Oleh Olegovych Kroka (also Oleg Kryoka, Ukrainian: Олег Олегович Крьока; born January 17, 1987, in Dnipropetrovsk) is an amateur Ukrainian Greco-Roman wrestler, who played for the men's heavyweight category. Kryoka represented Ukraine at the 2008 Summer Olympics in Beijing, where he competed for the men's 96 kg class. He lost the qualifying round match to Turkish wrestler and Olympic bronze medalist Mehmet Özal, with a three-set technical score (2–4, 2–1, 1–1), and a classification point score of 1–3.
