= Oganes Arutunyan =

Armenian wrestler (born 1960)

Personal information
- Born: 15 October 1960 (age 65) Talin, Armenia
- Weight: 57 kg (126 lb)

Sport
- Sport: Wrestling
- Event: Greco-Roman
- Coached by: Yuri Karapetyan; Alexander Sheleg
Medal record
Men's Greco-Roman wrestling
Representing the Soviet Union
World Championships
Silver medal – second place	1985 Kolbotn	57 kg
European Championships
Gold medal – first place	1985 Leipzig	57 kg

Oganes Arutunyan (Armenian: Հովհաննես Հարությունյան, born 15 October 1960) is a former Soviet Armenian Greco-Roman wrestler and current coach. He won a gold medal at the 1985 European Wrestling Championships and silver medal at the 1985 World Wrestling Championships at 57 kg.

== Biography ==
Arutunyan was born on 15 October 1960 in Talin, Armenia. His family moved to Gyumri in 1966, where he began studying Greco-Roman wrestling in 1972 under the coaching of Yuri Karapetyan. In 1977, he became the USSR Champion as a junior.

In 1978, Arutunyan entered the Belarusian State University of Physical Training and moved to Minsk, where he continued to train under honored coach of the USSR Alexander Sheleg. He won the USSR Championship in 1984 and 1985. Arutunyan won the gold medal at the 1985 European Wrestling Championships in Leipzig and the silver medal at the 1985 World Wrestling Championships in Kolbotn. In 1989, he completed his career.

Later he participated in the veterans tournament and as a coach worked on a master's degree at the College of Sports and Olympic Games preparations. Since 2007, he works as a coach on physical training for FC Dinamo Minsk.
