= Vasily Gogolev =

Personal information
- Native name: Василий Николаевич Гоголев
- Born: October 9, 1957 Churapcha, Churapchinsky District, Yakut ASSR, RSFSR, USSR
- Height: 153 cm (5 ft 0 in)
- Weight: 48 kg (106 lb)

Sport
- Country: Soviet Union
- Sport: Freestyle wrestling
- Club: Armed forces (Yakutsk)
- Coached by: Dmitry Korkin; B. Molchanov.
Medal record
Men's Freestyle wrestling
Wrestling World Cup
Silver medal – second place	1983 Toledo, Ohio	48 kg
World Wrestling Championships
Bronze medal – third place	1985 Budapest	48 kg
FILA Wrestling European Championships
Bronze medal – third place	1982 Varna	48 kg
Gold medal – first place	1985 Leipzig	48 kg
Gold medal – first place	1988 Manchester	48 kg
Goodwill Games
Gold medal – first place	1986 Moscow	48 kg
- Updated on 16 September 2016

Vasily Gogolev (Russian: Василий Николаевич Гоголев) is a Soviet Freestyle wrestler, champion of the USSR and Europe, winner of the USSR Cup, and winner of the Goodwill Games.

== Sport results ==
- 1981 USSR Freestyle Wrestling championship — (silver)
- 1982 USSR Freestyle Wrestling championship — (bronze)
- 1983 USSR Freestyle Wrestling championship — (silver)
- 1984 USSR Freestyle Wrestling championship — (gold)
- 1985 USSR Freestyle Wrestling championship — (gold)
- 1986 USSR Freestyle Wrestling championship — (gold)
- Commonwealth of Independent States Freestyle Wrestling championship — (silver) ;
