= Thomas Horschel =

German wrestler

Personal information
- Nationality: East German
- Born: 13 December 1960 (age 65) Suhl, East Germany

Sport
- Sport: Wrestling
Medal record
Representing East Germany
European Championships
Silver medal – second place	1984 Jönköping	-90 kg
Silver medal – second place	1986 Piraeus	-90 kg
Summer Universiade
Silver medal – second place	1981 Bucharest	-90 kg

Thomas Horschel (born 13 December 1960) is a former East German wrestler. He competed in the men's Greco-Roman 90 kg at the 1980 Summer Olympics.
