= István Séllyei =

Hungarian wrestler (1950–2020)

Personal information
- Nationality: Hungarian
- Born: 8 June 1950 Eger, Hungary
- Died: 19 July 2020 (aged 70) Budapest, Hungary

Sport
- Sport: Wrestling

István Séllyei (8 June 1950 – 19 July 2020) was a Hungarian wrestler. He competed in the men's Greco-Roman 90 kg at the 1976 Summer Olympics.
