= Norbert Növényi =

Hungarian Olympic wrestler, kickboxer and actor

Personal information
- Born: May 15, 1957 (age 69) Budapest, Hungary

Sport
- Country: Hungary
- Sport: Wrestling, kickboxing, mixed martial arts
- Weight class: Light heavyweight
Medal record
Men's Greco-Roman wrestling
Representing Hungary
Olympic Games
| Gold medal – first place | 1980 Moscow | 90 kg |

Norbert Nottny Növényi (born 15 May 1957) is a Hungarian light heavyweight wrestling Olympic champion of the 1980 Summer Olympics, two times kickboxing world champion and currently an actor in Hungary. In January 2009, he became the oldest WFCA mixed martial arts world champion.

== Acting career ==
He appeared in a minor role in the Hollywood film Red Heat, which starred Arnold Schwarzenegger. He played a Moscow thug who was smuggling cocaine in his artificial leg. He played a longer role in Péter Tímár's satire Zimmer Feri in 1997. He also attended a drama course of Mária Gór-Nagy. His longest role was in Az Alkimista és a Szűz (The Alchemist and the Virgin, 1999) by Zoltán Kamondi. He played the role of the title virgin's boyfriend. He also appeared in the award-winning Taxidermia by György Pálfi.

== Sport titles ==
- 2009 W.F.C.A. world champion (MMA)
- 1987 W.A.K.O. World Championships Munich (gold) +91 kg (Full-Contact)
- 1980 Olympic Games Moscow (gold) -90 kg (Wrestling)
