= Igor Kanygin =

Belarusian wrestler (born 1956)

Medal record

Men's Greco-Roman wrestling

Representing the Soviet Union

Olympic Games
Silver medal – second place	1980 Moscow	light-heavyweight

Friendship Games
Gold medal – first place	1984 Budapest	-90 kg

World Championships
Gold medal – first place	1981 Oslo	-90 kg
Bronze medal – third place	1982 Katowice	-90 kg
Gold medal – first place	1983 Kyiv	-90 kg
Silver medal – second place	1985 Kolbotn	-90 kg

European Championships
Gold medal – first place	1980 Prievidza	-90 kg
Gold medal – first place	1982 Varna	-90 kg
Gold medal – first place	1983 Budapest	-90 kg
Silver medal – second place	1984 Jönköping	-90 kg
Gold medal – first place	1985 Leipzig	-90 kg

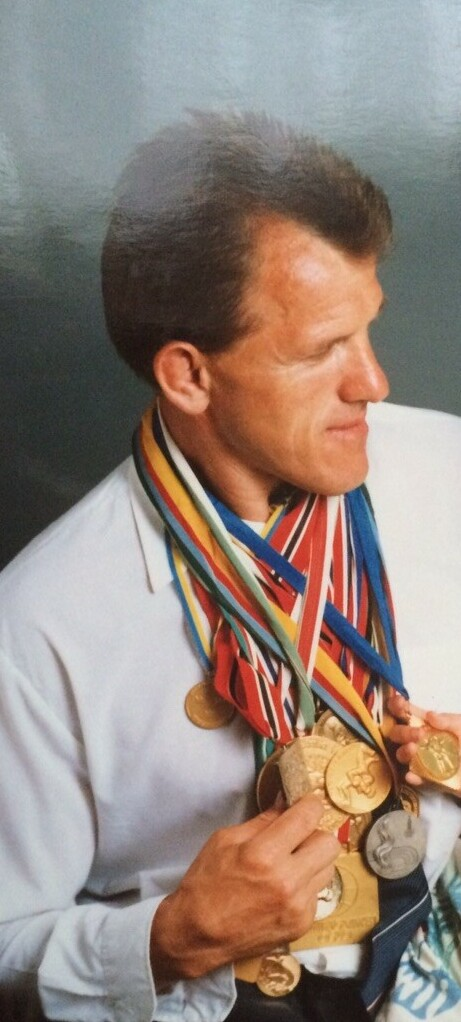
Kanygin in 2019

Igor Kanygin (born 6 June 1956 in Vitebsk) is a Belarusian former wrestler who competed in the 1980 Summer Olympics.
