= Maranatha Baptist University =

Private Baptist university in Watertown, Wisconsin

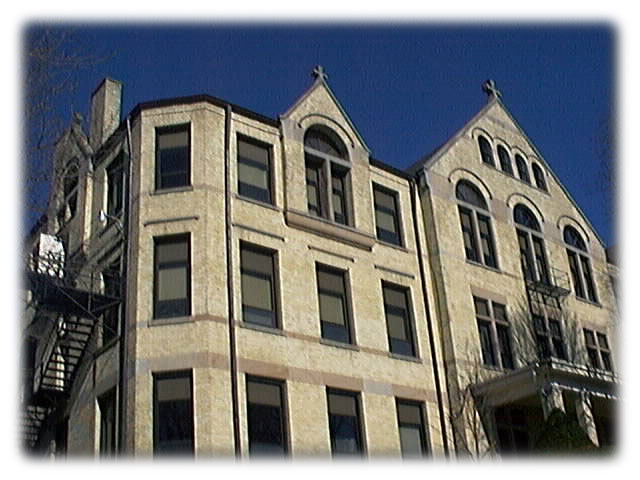
- Maranatha's Old Main
- Former name: Maranatha Baptist Bible College (1968–2013)
- Motto: "To the Praise of His Glory"
- Type: Private university
- Established: 1968
- Founder: B. Myron Cedarholm
- Religious affiliation: Foundations Baptist Fellowship International (informal)
- Chancellor: S. Martin Marriott
- President: David Anderson
- Undergraduates: c. 920
- Postgraduates: c. 300
- Location: Watertown, Wisconsin, U.S. 43.1955°N 88.7391°W
- Campus: Urban, 79 acres (32 ha)
- Colors: Navy blue, gold, & red
- Sporting affiliations: NCAA Division III – Independent
- Mascot: Sabercats
- Website: www.mbu.edu

Maranatha Baptist University is a private Baptist university in Watertown, Wisconsin.

== History ==
The institution was founded in 1968 as Maranatha Baptist Bible College by B. Myron Cedarholm. The college was named for the Aramaic phrase Maranatha, which means "Lo, He cometh" (I Corinthians 16:22). Cedarholm helped raise $150,000 to purchase the Watertown campus, now valued at $18 million, from the Brothers of the Holy Cross located in South Bend, Indiana. Maranatha Baptist Bible College opened just three months later, on September 10, 1968, with 173 students and 27 faculty members. Maranatha awarded degrees to the first graduating class, 13 students, on May 31, 1969.

Maranatha was chartered by the State of Wisconsin in 1968 and accredited by the Higher Learning Commission in 1993. In 2013, the institution changed its name to Maranatha Baptist University.

The current president is David Anderson, who began his duties during the summer of 2023. Since 2021, Matthew Davis has functioned as the university's CEO. At the end of the spring semester of 2023, former president Marty Marriott transitioned to the role of chancellor, only the second person to hold that title in Maranatha's history.

Since the college's beginning, more than 40 different building projects, including the Cedarholm Library, dormitories, a science lab and classroom building, and the Dining Complex, have been completed. The second decade of the 21st century saw Maranatha Online and Distance Learning and Maranatha Baptist Seminary solidly established.

=== Presidents ===
- B. Myron Cedarholm (1968–1983)
- Arno Q. Weniger, Jr. (1983–1998)
- David Jaspers (1998–2006)
- Charles Phelps (2007–2009)
- S. Martin Marriott (2009–2023)
- David Anderson (2023-present)

== Academics ==
Maranatha Baptist University offers nine associate degrees, twenty-nine bachelor's degrees, nine master's degrees and one doctorate. Maranatha Baptist Bible Institute and Maranatha Baptist Seminary, operated by the university and located on the Watertown campus, offer specialized degrees for those pursuing Christian ministry. The university has two colleges, three schools and a Seminary and Bible Institute:

- College of Bible and Church Ministries
- College of Arts and Sciences (Humanities, Music, Science)
- School of Business
- School of Education
- School of Nursing
- Maranatha Baptist Seminary
- Maranatha Baptist Bible Institute

Maranatha has 78.5% of classes with fewer than 20 students and has a 12:1 student-faculty ratio.

=== Accreditation and memberships ===
Maranatha has been accredited by the Higher Learning Commission since 1993. Education programs at MBU are recognized by the Wisconsin Department of Public Instruction for purposes of teacher certification. The university's nursing department is approved by the Wisconsin State Board of Nursing Department and accredited by the Commission on Collegiate Nursing Education (CCNE).

MBU maintains memberships in various organizations including the American Association of Collegiate Registrars and Admissions Officers, American Association of Christian Colleges and Seminaries, National Christian College Athletic Association- Division II, and the National Collegiate Athletic Association- Division III.

=== Rankings ===
For its 2022 rankings, U.S. News & World Report ranked Maranatha #25 in Regional Colleges Midwest and #3 in Top Performers on Social Mobility.

== Campus ==
=== Old Main ===
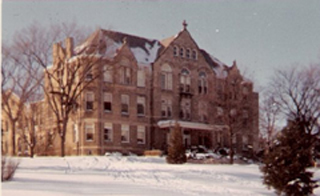
Old Main in winter

Construction of Old Main was started in 1873 and completed in four phases over the course of 21 years. Originally home to Sacred Heart College, the building was purchased from the Brothers of Holy Cross by B. Myron Cedarholm in 1968. It now houses three floors of classrooms, administrative offices, Maranatha Baptist Academy, the campus post office, and two fine arts performance halls. Old Main is also home to the campus coffeehouse Old Main Cafe which was established in 2007.

=== Dining complex ===
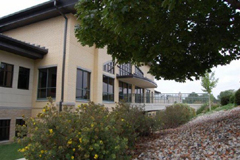
Dining complex east entrance

The 40,568-square-foot (3,768.9 m^{2}) dining complex was completed in 2005, and serves nearly 1,500 meals every weekday. It seats almost 400 in a variety of seating arrangements. It also has eight classrooms, two computer labs, and wireless networking.

=== Cedarholm Library ===
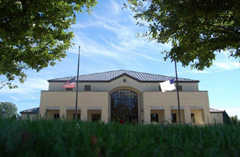
Cedarholm Library from the north

Opened in 1996, the Cedarholm Library has resources for research and casual reading. A web-based OPAC (online public access catalog), computer-equipped workstations, a media center, and instructional material curriculum are some of the resources available.

=== Gymnasium ===
The gymnasium houses Maranatha's athletic facilities, including two gymnasiums, a weight room, fitness area, trainer and faculty offices, several locker room facilities, and the Alumni Hall of Fame. The main gymnasium also doubles as an auditorium, which is used for chapel services, special meetings, drama performances, and music concerts.

=== Hanneman Hall ===
Named after the late Robert Hanneman, Jr., a potato geneticist at the University of Wisconsin and friend of the college, Hanneman Hall houses Maranatha's nursing program and science department.

== Student life ==
Students can participate in a variety of campus activities, including intramural sports, blood drives, special lectures, Fine arts, music and drama, student service societies, and intercollegiate athletics. Chapel services are also a part of life at Maranatha. Maranatha requires its students to follow a code of personal conduct based on New Testament Biblical principles. Those who violate Maranatha's student life policies are subject to disciplinary action.

All undergraduate students are required to live on campus until age 23, unless living with parents and commuting to classes. Dorm leadership consists of "room leaders," "resident assistants," and "dorm supervisors."

Students may also be elected to student body offices, where they participate in planning campus events and leading special student meetings and programs. Additional leadership opportunities exist in numerous resident student organizations on campus.

== ROTC ==
Maranatha's army ROTC detachment, Charlie Company of Badger Battalion, established in 2006, partnered with the University of Wisconsin to produce 65 United States Army Officers for the Active, Reserve, and National Guard components. The 2021–2022 academic year was the last year of operation for Charlie Company due to Army ROTC downsizing that closed a number of small programs. Charlie Company won the five-man category of the Badger Ranger Challenge competition on numerous occasions. MBU still partners with nearby colleges and universities to offer an Air Force ROTC program.

== Athletics ==
Maranatha Baptist athletic teams are called the Sabercats. Since 1999, the university has been a member of the Division III level of the National Collegiate Athletic Association (NCAA), primarily competing as an NCAA D-III Independent since the 2013–14 academic year. They currently are a member of the National Christian College Athletic Association (NCCAA), primarily competing the Mid-West Region of the Division II level. Sabercats previously competed as a charter member of the Northern Athletics Conference (NAC; now known as the Northern Athletics Collegiate Conference (NACC) since the 2013–14 school year) from 2006–07 to 2012–13.

Maranatha Baptist competes in ten intercollegiate varsity sports: Men's sports baseball, basketball, cross country, soccer and volleyball; while women's sports include basketball, cross country, soccer, softball and volleyball.

=== Nickname ===
The athletics teams were named the Crusaders, but in the fall of 2014, the name was changed to the Sabercats, while keeping the colors blue and gold.

=== Football ===
MBU's overall program record is 141-250-3. Over the course of 47 years of history, the football program won 6 conference Championships: 1975, 1976, 1990, 1996, 1998, and 2002. The team appeared in one bowl game in 1998. MBU was affiliated with the Upper Midwest Conference and the Northern Athletics Conference. As of February 2, 2017, Maranatha discontinued its football program.

=== Women's volleyball ===
Maranatha has a winning tradition in women's volleyball. The overall program record is 602-323 (.651) The team has won 23 NCCAA Regional Championships and eight NCCAA National Championships (1987, 1989, 1990, 1991, 1992, 1994, 2015, 2016, 2017).

=== Men's basketball ===
MBU's men's basketball team has an overall program record of 537–748. The team has won six conference championships (Lake Michigan Conference, WCIC), 11 NCCAA regional championships and one NCCAA National Championship (1990). The Sabercats compete in both the NCAA Division III and the NCCAA Division II.

== Notable alumni ==
- Tom Allen - college football coach
- Daniel Davis - politician
- Jim Gruenwald - Greco-Roman wrestler
- Mike Houck - Greco-Roman wrestler
- Sam Low - politician
- Nate Oats - college basketball coach
- Benjamin Lee Peterson - Olympic wrestler
- Wira Wama - professional soccer player
