= Adam Wheeler (wrestler) =

American wrestler (born 1981)

Personal information
- Born: March 24, 1981 (age 45) Lancaster, California, U.S.
- Height: 6 ft 3 in (191 cm)
- Weight: 96 kg (212 lb)

Sport
- Country: United States
- Sport: Wrestling
- Event: Greco-Roman
- College team: Northern Michigan
- Club: Gator Wrestling Club
- Team: USA
- Coached by: Rob Hermann, Ivan Ivanov, Steve Fraser
Medal record
Men's Greco-Roman wrestling
Representing United States
Olympic Games
Bronze medal – third place	2008 Beijing	96 kg

Adam Wheeler (born March 24, 1981) is an American former Greco-Roman wrestler, best known for his bronze medal performance at the 2008 Summer Olympics.
