= Fred Theobald =

German wrestler

Personal information
- Nationality: German
- Born: 19 June 1950 (age 76) Pirmasens, Germany

Sport
- Sport: Wrestling

Fred Theobald (born 19 June 1950) is a German wrestler. He competed in the men's Greco-Roman 90 kg at the 1976 Summer Olympics.
