= Atef Mahayri =

Syrian wrestler

Personal information
- Nationality: Syrian
- Born: 3 June 1952 (age 74)

Sport
- Sport: Wrestling

Atef Mahayri (born 3 June 1952) is a Syrian wrestler. He competed in the men's Greco-Roman 90 kg at the 1980 Summer Olympics, where he lost both of his matches.
