= USA Wrestling =

Sports governing organization

USA Wrestling (United States of America Wrestling Association, Inc.)
- Formation: 1983 (founded as the United States Wrestling Federation in 1968)
- Type: Sports federation for amateur wrestling
- Headquarters: Colorado Springs, Colorado, U.S.
- Members: State wrestling federations, amateur wrestling associations, and individuals ranging from wrestlers, coaches, officials, parents, and devotees of wrestling
- Executive Director: Rich Bender
- Website: www.themat.com

USA Wrestling (formerly known as the United States Wrestling Federation and as the United States Wrestling Association) is the organization that currently governs freestyle wrestling and Greco-Roman wrestling in the United States. USA Wrestling is also the official representative to the United States Olympic & Paralympic Committee (USOPC) and to United World Wrestling (UWW) and is considered the national governing body of the sport at the competitive level.

== History ==
When amateur wrestling, especially freestyle wrestling, gained prominence as an amateur sport after the Civil War, the Amateur Athletic Union first began to regulate it, sponsoring national tournaments and local athletic clubs in amateur wrestling. But collegiate wrestling (particularly in institutions of higher education and secondary schools) began to differ from freestyle wrestling. With the larger crowds drawn to the wrestling matches sponsored by schools than by the Amateur Athletic Union, the AAU's prominence soon gave way to governing bodies such as the National Collegiate Athletic Association (NCAA).

The decline of amateurism in the United States loosened the AAU's hold over the governance of amateur sports. Yet because the AAU regulated a vast assortment of sports, the collegiate wrestling authorities still had little say about its governance. The lackluster performance of the United States Olympic teams sponsored by the AAU in 1964, and a similar performance by its World Teams the following year, prompted many to call for a national wrestling federation that would challenge the AAU in its regulation of the sport. The efforts were led by Terry McCann, a 1960 Olympic gold medalist who was then stationed at the U.S. Jaycees national office in Tulsa, Oklahoma, and Myron Roderick, a member of the U.S. Olympic team in 1956 and who later became wrestling coach at Oklahoma State University. Supported by such officials as Walter Byers, then the executive director of the NCAA, wrestling officials sought to establish a new national governing organization.

A preliminary meeting was held at O'Hare Airport in January 1968, chaired by Dr. Albert de Ferrari, in his role as the delegate from the United States to UWW, then known as the International Federation of Associated Wrestling Styles (FILA). There was still much discord between those who were partial to the AAU, who still held ties to FILA, and with spokesmen from the NCAA and high school associations. Steering and finance committees soon met together to discuss a constitution and bylaws for the new organization and a proposed budget, which called for national offices and an executive director. In the summer of 1968 between July 31 and August 1, another conference at O'Hare Inn in Chicago set the stage for the founding of the United States Wrestling Federation (USWF).

Early on, the new organization sought to build grassroots support at the state level by recruiting athletes as members and also by sponsoring international exchanges by high schools and colleges, which preceded today's state and national exchange programs. Clinics were also held that taught skills need for the international styles. At the organizational meeting in July 1968, most of the twenty-nine delegates were either collegiate wrestling coaches, representatives of collegiate athletic conferences, or spokesmen from other college and high school associations. Two international wrestling referees were present, as well as a delegate representative active wrestlers. Wallace T. "Wally" Johnson, then wrestling coach at the University of Minnesota, was elected its first president. For the first twelve years of the organization, the presidents of the USWF were collegiate coaches.

FILA soon declared that it would no longer accept "umbrella" organizations (organizations that governed a variety of sports, such as the AAU) as members, and so would look for single sport governing bodies as members. With this decision, the new United States Wrestling Federation still had the opportunity to supplant the AAU. In April 1969, the USWF held its first freestyle and Greco-Roman wrestling championships in Evanston, Illinois. Michael Kaye won the first United States Wrestling Federation National Championship when he won the 105.5 LB Freestyle National Championship in 1969. Mylon Roderick was soon appointed by the Governing Council (the board of directors) its first executive director in August of that year. With the national offices now located in Stillwater, Oklahoma, Roderick set about establishing the state federations that would form the backbone of the USWF, recruiting wrestling coaches officials to serve as state chairmen, regional supervisors, and state directors.

In 1970, following the disenfranchising trial by FILA, the sport's international governing body, the new federation had a handbook, which set international rules, bylaws, the USWF national structure, international rules, honors for wrestlers and coaches, and advertising for summer wrestling camps and wrestling products. This was sent to more than 11,000 high school and college coaches. Senior and junior teams soon emerged from the federation to compete against other countries, and other countries agreed to wrestle members of the federation. Vince Zuaro from New York, an Olympic wrestling referee, established the United States Wrestling Officials Association. Technique and coaching clinics, membership forms, and event sanctions were established and in 1972 Bob Dellinger was appointed assistant executive director. In 1971, international responsibilities caused the federation to face financial difficulties; this was also the case in 1982, in which the federation was almost bankrupt. Olympic funds from Los Angeles soon handled the difficulties.

Steve Combs, a suburban Chicago high school wrestling coach, succeeded Roderick as executive director in 1974 and from then on membership increased tenfold. Combs sought to strengthen the state wrestling federations and provided them with literature, films, clinics, and other educational resources to promote the sport. The U.S. Wrestling Officials Association expanded, and the United States Kids Wrestling Federation was created in 1974, which soon merged into the national federation as a voting member in its Governing Council.

The National Wrestling Hall of Fame and Museum was established in Stillwater, Oklahoma on September 11, 1976. This was a major boost in the USWF's goal in becoming the national sport governing body when it faced legal battles. The Amateur Sports Act of 1978 specified the operations of the United States Olympic Committee (USOC; now USOPC) and the national governing bodies. The USOC refused to seat the USWF as a Group A member, and told the federation it could not be recognized as the national governing body until it was recognized by FILA. A federal judge in Washington, D.C. ruled that the AAU and the USOC should support the Federation's bid at the 1980 FILA Congress, but still ordered that funds be supplied to the AAU in the meantime.

The United States Congress later amended the Amateur Sports Act to include the provision that the USOC would not recognize any arbitration loser, and the federation was again in arbitration. On August 20, 1982, federal judge Ann Aldrich ordered the AAU to resign from and sever all ties with the United States Olympic Committee and FILA, and also ordered the USOC to remove the AAU as a Group A member. William E. Simon, the USOC's president at the time, convened on September 23 a panel to create the new United States Wrestling Association (USWA). The offices would be located in the Hall of Fame in Stillwater, with Combs as executive director and the departments of the USWF kept intact. Other committees would be added that emphasized the individual styles and the development and financing of the sport. An executive committee was created that included five representatives from the USWF, five from the AAU, and three elected by active wrestlers. The AAU eventually refused to participate, but the new executive committee established a board of directors and a national structure built on the state federations. The USWA sent its first international team in November of that year to Hungary for the Greco-Roman World Cup. After further conflicts with the AAU, the team from the USWA was finally permitted to wrestle by FILA.

In March 1983, the executive committee met again and incorporated the United States of America Wrestling Association, Inc., to be known publicly as USA Wrestling (USAW). Officers were elected and the association was recognized as a Group A member of the United States Olympic Committee and as the official representative to FILA. USA Wrestling soon competed in many international tournaments in freestyle and Greco-Roman, including the 1984 Summer Olympics in Los Angeles. On April 25, 1984, USA Wrestling became a voting member of the FILA Congress, with a probation period that expired in 1986. In 1987, the board of directors voted to move the headquarters from Stillwater, Oklahoma (where the Hall of Fame and Museum were still to be maintained) to Colorado Springs, Colorado, where the USOC had its headquarters.

== Organization and governance ==
USA Wrestling today has more than 159,000 members, composed of wrestlers, coaches, officials, state federations, and others interested in the sport. The organization is governed by a board of directors, including of a President, the preceding past President, two Vice Presidents, a Secretary, a Treasurer, and various members, including active wrestlers, the chairman of the state chairmen's council, representatives from the Kids and Junior Divisions, and representatives from the NCAA, the NAIA, the NFHS, the NJCAA, the National Wrestling Coaches Association, the Armed Forces Sports Council, the United States Wrestling Officials Association, and other associations that may be involved in amateur wrestling. An executive director (currently Rich Bender) supervises the day-to-day operations of USA Wrestling with his staff.

The foundation of USA Wrestling is found in its various state federations, which regulate freestyle and Greco-Roman competition and sponsor tournaments and dual meets in every state. Through the state federations, USA Wrestling charters over 2,900 wrestling clubs every year. These wrestling clubs often give the chance for people, especially youth, to learn the basics of wrestling and to enter competition.

== National teams ==
As of 2021 World Championships

=== U.S. Freestyle men's national team ===
Weight	First	Second	Third
57 kg	Thomas Gilman		
61 kg	Dayton Fix	Nathan Tomaselo	Carter Young
65 kg	Yianni Diakomihalis	Joseph McKenna	Evan Henderson
70 kg	James Green	Ryan Deakin	Zain Retherford
74 kg	Kyle Dake		
79 kg	Jordan Burroughs	Alex Dieringer	Carter Starocci
86 kg	David Taylor		
92 kg	J'den Cox	Kolin Moore	Trent Hidlay
97 kg	Kyle Snyder		
125 kg	Nick Gwiazdowski	Mason Parris	Hayden Zilmer

=== U.S. Freestyle women's national team ===
Weight	First	Second	Third
50 kg	Sara Hildebrandt		
53 kg	Amy Fearnside	Ronna Heaton	Areana Villaescusa
55 kg	Jenna Burkert	Jacarra Winchester	Marissa Gallegos
57 kg	Helen Maroulis		
59 kg	Maya Nelson	Megan Black	Xochitl Mota-Pettis
62 kg	Kayla Miracle	Mallory Velte	Jennifer Rogers
65 kg	Forrest Molinari	Emma Bruntil	Alara Boyd
68 kg	Tamyra Mensah-Stock		
72 kg	Kylie Welker	Kennedy Blades	Yelena Makoyed
76 kg	Adeline Gray		

=== U.S. Greco Roman men's national team ===
Weight	First	Second	Third
55 kg	Max Nowry	Brady Koontz	Dalton Duffield
60 kg	Dalton Roberts	Ildar Hafizov	King Sandoval
63 kg	Sammy Jones	David Stephania	Dylan Gregerson
67 kg	Peyton Omania	Alejandro Sancho	Hayden Tuma
72 kg	Patrick Smith	Benjamin Peak	Jamel Johnson
77 kg	Jesse Porter	Fritz Schierl	Britton Holmes
82 kg	Ben Provisor	Spencer Woods	Richard Carlson
87 kg	Alan Vera	Ryan Epps	Tyler Hannah
97 kg	G'Angelo Hancock	Nicolas Boykin	Khymba Johnson
130 kg	Cohlton Schultz	Jacob Mitchell	Tanner Farmer

== Current sponsorships ==
- Nike
- US Marines
- Dollamur
- NCSA
- Opro
- Pure Clean Sports
- Suples
- Usana
- Takedown
- Tanita
- Veintentours
- Hasty
- PinTV

== See also ==
- National Wrestling Hall of Fame and Museum
- United World Wrestling
- United States Olympic & Paralympic Committee
