= Marty Morgan =

American wrestler

Personal information
- Born: August 12, 1966 (age 60) Minneapolis, Minnesota, U.S.

Sport
- Country: United States
- Sport: Wrestling
- Events: Greco-Roman and Folkstyle
- College team: Minnesota; North Dakota State
- Club: Minnesota Storm
- Team: USA
Medal record
Collegiate Wrestling
Representing the Minnesota Golden Gophers
NCAA Division I Championships
Gold medal – first place	1991 Iowa City	177 lb
Silver medal – second place	1990 College Park	177 lb
Representing the North Dakota State Bison
NCAA Division II Championships
Gold medal – first place	1987 Edwardsville	167 lb

Marty Morgan (born August 12, 1966) is a former American wrestler. He was the 1991 NCAA National Champion (177 pounds; 39–0 record for season, the first wrestler ever in U of MN history to have undefeated national championship season) and was an overall 4-time All-American in college.

== Early life ==
Morgan wrestled at Kennedy High School in Bloomington, Minnesota.

== College ==
Morgan first wrestled for one year at North Dakota State University, where he was an NCAA Division II National Champion as a freshman. Morgan then finished his collegiate career at the University of Minnesota where he was an undefeated NCAA Division I National Champion as a senior.

== International ==
After college, Morgan won 2 US Open National Greco Titles and represented the US on the World Team in 1993 and 1995. He placed 2nd at the 1996 US Olympic Trials, losing in overtime to Dan Henderson.

In 2001, the Minnesota Wrestling Coaches Association inducted Morgan into the Dave Bartelma Hall of Fame. In 2018, Morgan was inducted into the National Wrestling Hall of Fame.
