= Brandon Paulson =

American Greco-Roman wrestler (born 1973)

Personal information
- Full name: Brandon Douglas Paulson
- Born: October 22, 1973 (age 52) Coon Rapids, Minnesota, U.S.

Sport
- Country: United States
- Sport: Wrestling
- Events: Greco-Roman and Folkstyle
- College team: Minnesota
- Club: Minnesota Storm
- Team: USA
Medal record
Men's Greco-Roman wrestling
Representing United States
Olympic Games
Silver medal – second place	1996 Atlanta	52 kg
World Championships
Silver medal – second place	2001 Sofia	54 kg

Brandon Douglas Paulson (born October 22, 1973) is a former Olympic Greco-Roman wrestler and current wrestling coach.Born in Coon Rapids, Minnesota,Paulson is a 1992 graduate of Anoka High School. At Anoka High, Paulson was a three time state champion in his weight class and was named Mr. Minnesota Wrestling in his senior year after finishing with a career record of 155–12–1. Paulson was the first high school wrestler to earn a spot on the U.S. National Senior team when he qualified for the 1991–1992 team. In 1993 he was a Junior World Silver Medalist. Overall, he earned 16 national titles in Greco-Roman and Freestyle wrestling, and was a 1996 Olympic silver medalist in the 114.5 lbs weight class in Greco-Roman wrestling.

Following the 1996 Olympics, Paulson wrestled for the University of Minnesota, becoming an NCAA All-American in 1998. After his collegiate career, Paulson continued to focus on Greco-Roman Wrestling, as he went on to represent the United States in the World Championships in 2001, 2002, and 2003, winning a silver medal in 2001. After retiring from wrestling, Paulson served as assistant coach for the Anoka High School wrestling team from 2005 to 2008 (helping to produce seven individual championships at his alma mater) and was named USA Wrestling's Greco-Roman Coach Of The Year in 2008. Paulson was also the trainer and personal mentor for Greco-Roman wrestler, and fellow Anoka alumni, Jake Deitchler as he prepared to compete in the 2008 Beijing Summer Olympics. Paulson went on to be a club coach for the Minnesota Storm and currently is the co-director of the Pinnacle Wrestling School in Shoreview, MN and continues to be a coach for USA Wrestling. In September, 2011, Paulson was named to the inaugural class of the Anoka High School Hall of Fame.

In 2019, Paulson was inducted into the National Wrestling Hall of Fame as a Distinguished Member.

Paulson, his wife Rochell, and his three children, Elijah, Abby, and Sydney reside in Anoka. Abby was an elite gymnast training at Twin City Twisters, and is now a gymnast at the University of Utah. She qualified to the P&G Championships in 2015, 2016 and 2017. She also qualified for the 2017 Jesolo Trophy, Jesolo, Italy - 1st-Team, FX(T); 3rd-AA.
