= James Martinez (wrestler) =

American wrestler (born 1958)

Personal information
- Born: November 14, 1958 (age 67) Osseo, Minnesota, U.S.

Sport
- Country: United States
- Sport: Wrestling
- Events: Greco-Roman and Folkstyle
- College team: Minnesota
- Club: Minnesota Wrestling Club
- Team: USA
- Coached by: Ronald Finley
Medal record
Representing the United States
Men's Greco-Roman wrestling
Olympic Games
Bronze medal – third place	1984 Los Angeles	68 kg
World Championships
Bronze medal – third place	1985 Kolbotn	68 kg

James "Jim" Martinez (born November 14, 1958) is an American former wrestler. He was born in Osseo, Minnesota. Martinez was an Olympic bronze medalist in Greco-Roman wrestling at the 1984 Summer Olympics. Martinez did professional wrestling in Minnesota for the American Wrestling Association in 1984. He also won a bronze medal at the 1985 World Wrestling Championships.

Martinez wrestled for the University of Minnesota, where he was a Big Ten Champion and NCAA Division I All-American. From 2009 to 2019, he was the head coach of Corona del Sol High School wrestling team, where he won two state championships in 2010 and 2017. As a head coach, the Corona wrestling team consistently finished in the top 10 teams in the state every year. He resigned in 2019.

On October 18, 2014, Martinez was inducted into the Alan and Gloria Rice Hall of Champions as part of the National Wrestling Hall of Fame.
