= Sammy Jones (wrestler) =

American wrestler (born 1993)

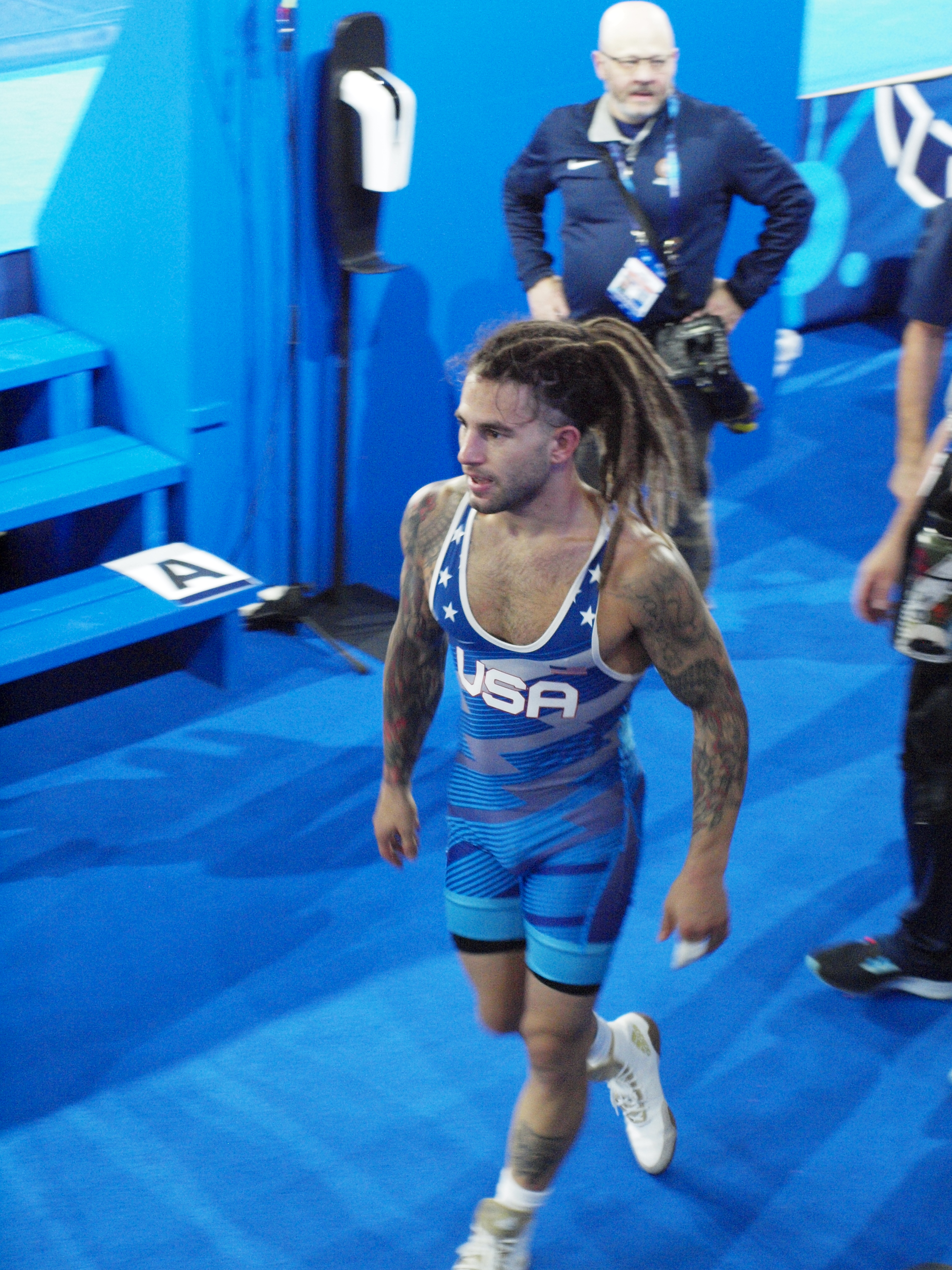
- Jones at the 2021 World Wrestling Championships

Personal information
- Full name: Samuel Lee Jones
- Born: November 9, 1993 (age 32) Folsom, Louisiana, U.S.

Sport
- Country: United States
- Sport: Wrestling
- Event: Greco-Roman
- College team: Northern Michigan
- Club: New York Athletic Club
- Team: USA
Medal record
Men's Greco-Roman wrestling
Representing the United States
University World Championships
Bronze medal – third place	2014 Pecs	59 kg
Pan American Championships
Gold medal – first place	2022 Acapulco	63 kg
Bronze medal – third place	2016 Frisco	59 kg

Samuel Lee Jones (born November 9, 1993) is an American Greco-Roman wrestler. He represented the United States at the World Championships in Greco-Roman wrestling at 63 kg in 2021 and 2022.

== Early life and college ==
Jones grew up in Folsom, Louisiana, where he was homeschooled. Starting his freshman year of high school, Jones focused only on the Olympic styles of wrestling, freestyle and Greco-Roman. While in high school, Jones built a relationship with Rob Hermann, a Greco-Roman wrestling coach at Northern Michigan University. After initially taking a year off from wrestling his freshman year of college, Jones reached back out to Hermann about wrestling Greco-Roman at Northern Michigan, and from there, was welcomed to come up and start training.

== Greco-Roman wrestling ==
Jones won a bronze medal at the 2014 University World Championships at 59 kg, his first medal at a tournament on the Senior level.

He broke through to make his first United States Greco-Roman World Team in 2021, winning the 63 kg spot. Jones earned a spot on the United States World Team again in 2022 at 63 kg.

Other Greco-Roman wrestling accomplishments for Jones include being a two-time medalist at the Pan American Championships, winning in 2022.
