= Petre Dicu =

Romanian Greco-Roman wrestler

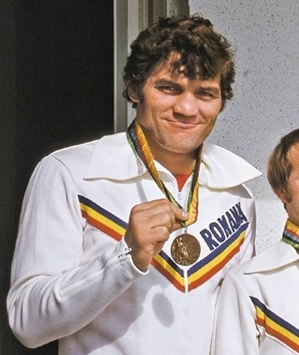
- Dicu at the 1980 Olympics

Personal information
- Born: 27 May 1954 (age 72) Gostavăţu, Romania
- Height: 183 cm (6 ft 0 in)

Sport
- Sport: Greco-Roman wrestling CS Dinamo București
Medal record
Representing Romania
Olympic Games
| Bronze medal – third place | 1980 Moscow | -90 kg |
World Championships
| Silver medal – second place | 1977 Gothenburg | -90 kg |
European Championships
| Bronze medal – third place | 1978 Sofia | -90 kg |
| Bronze medal – third place | 1979 Bucharest | -90 kg |
Summer Universiade
| Bronze medal – third place | 1977 Sofia | -90 kg |

Petre Dicu (born 27 May 1954) is a retired light-heavyweight Greco-Roman wrestler from Romania. He competed at the 1976 and 1980 Olympics and won a bronze medal in 1980. He won two more bronze medals at European championships in 1978 and 1979 and a silver medal at the 1977 World Championships.
