= John Matthews (wrestler) =

American wrestler (born 1951)

Personal information
- Full name: John Kelly Matthews
- Born: December 27, 1951 (age 74) Flint, Michigan, U.S.
- Height: 5 ft 9 in (175 cm)
- Weight: 74 kg (163 lb)

Sport
- Country: United States
- Sport: Wrestling
- Event: Greco-Roman
- College team: Central Michigan
- Club: Michigan Wrestling Club
- Team: USA
Medal record
Men's Greco-Roman wrestling
Representing United States
Pan American Games
| Gold medal – first place | 1979 San Juan | 74 kg |

John Kelly Matthews (born December 27, 1951) is an American wrestler. He competed in the men's Greco-Roman 74 kg at the 1976 Summer Olympics. He began wrestling at age 12, with the hope of one day being an Olympic wrestler.
