= J Robinson =

American wrestler and coach (1946–2026)

Personal information
- Full name: Jay Paul Robinson
- Born: June 7, 1946 San Diego, California, U.S.
- Died: March 29, 2026 (aged 79) Spring Valley, California, U.S.

Sport
- Country: United States
- Sport: Wrestling
- Events: Greco-Roman, Freestyle, and Folkstyle
- College team: Oklahoma State
- Club: Minnesota Wrestling Club
- Team: USA

Jay Paul Robinson (June 7, 1946 – March 29, 2026), commonly known as J Robinson, was an American wrestler who competed in the 1972 Summer Olympics, where he competed as a middleweight Greco-Roman wrestler.

== Competitive career ==
As a Greco-Roman wrestler in the 82 kilogram weight class, Robinson finished 4th at the 1970 World Championships, held in Edmonton, Canada. He finished 5th at the 1971 World Championships in Sofia, Bulgaria. Robinson was also on the USA Greco-Roman Olympic team at the 1972 Summer Olympics in Munich, Germany.

== Coaching career ==
Robinson served as the head wrestling coach at the University of Minnesota for 30 years. His career record at Minnesota was 437-134-4.

His tenure ended on September 7, 2016, when the university fired him following an investigation into a prescription drug scandal involving members of the Golden Gophers wrestling program. Although Robinson was not accused of personally participating in the drug distribution, the university concluded that his handling of the incident warranted his dismissal.

During his tenure as head coach of Minnesota from 1986 to 2016, Minnesota won three NCAA Division I national championships (2001, 2002, 2007), six Big Ten conference tournament championships (1999, 2001, 2002, 2003, 2006, 2007), and had 14 individual NCAA Division I national champions.

== Death ==
Robinson died on March 29, 2026, at the age of 79.

== Honors ==
In 2005, Robinson was inducted into the National Wrestling Hall of Fame as a Distinguished Member.

In 2013, he was honored with the Alan and Gloria Rice Greco – Leadership Award.

In 2018, he was honored with the Lifetime Service to Wrestling for the Minnesota Chapter of the National Wrestling Hall of Fame.
