= Sadao Sato =

Japanese wrestler (born 1949)

Sadao Sato (佐藤 貞雄, Satō Sadao; 8 May 1949 – 23 October 2003) was a Japanese wrestler who competed in the 1972 Summer Olympics and in the 1976 Summer Olympics.
