= Gordy Morgan =

American wrestler

Personal information
- Born: August 12, 1966 (age 59) Minneapolis, Minnesota, U.S.

Sport
- Country: United States
- Sport: Wrestling
- Event: Greco-Roman
- College team: Minnesota
- Club: Minnesota Storm
- Team: USA

Gordy Morgan (born August 12, 1966) is an American former wrestler. He wrestled in the 74 kg weight class at the 1996 Olympics, finishing ninth, and was a 1990 and 1993–95 world team member. He was a 3-time National Greco-Roman champion (1991, 1993, 1994). In NCAA competition, he was the 1989 Big Ten champion in the 158 pound class and an NCAA All-American. He was also a 1985 Minnesota State High School champion in the 155 pound class.

In 2004, the Minnesota Wrestling Coaches Association inducted Morgan into the Dave Bartelma Hall of Fame

In 2006, Morgan was named USA Wrestling FILA Junior/University Person of the Year for his commitment to the sport and development of wrestlers.

== Early life ==
Morgan was born in Bloomington, Minnesota and attended Kennedy High School in Bloomington and the University of Minnesota, where he graduated with a degree in business.
