= Jamtsyn Bor =

Mongolian wrestler (born 1958)

Personal information
- Nationality: Mongolian
- Born: 24 March 1958 (age 68)

Sport
- Sport: Wrestling
Medal record
Men's freestyle wrestling
Representing Mongolia
Asian Games
Silver medal – second place	1978 Bangkok	100 kg

Jamtsyn Bor (born 24 March 1958) is a Mongolian wrestler. He competed in the men's Greco-Roman 90 kg at the 1980 Summer Olympics.
