= David Hazewinkel =

American wrestler (born 1944)

Dave Hazewinkel
Personal information
- Full name: David Gene Hazewinkel
- Born: September 8, 1944 (age 81) Detroit, Michigan, U.S.
- Home town: Anoka, Minnesota, U.S.

Sport
- Country: United States
- Sport: Wrestling
- Events: Greco-Roman and Folkstyle
- College team: St. Cloud State
- Club: U.S. Army and Minnesota Wrestling Club
- Team: USA
Medal record
Men's Greco-Roman wrestling
Representing the United States
World Championships
Silver medal – second place	1970 Edmonton	57 kg
Bronze medal – third place	1969 Mar del Plata	57 kg
Men's collegiate wrestling
Representing the St. Cloud State Huskies
NAIA Championships
Silver medal – second place	1965 Terre Haute	115 lb
Silver medal – second place	1966 St. Cloud	115 lb

David Gene "Dave" Hazewinkel (born September 8, 1944) is an American former wrestler who competed in the 1968 Summer Olympics and in the 1972 Summer Olympics in Greco-Roman wrestling. In college, Hazewinkel was a two-time NAIA wrestling All-American at St. Cloud State College. Born in Detroit, Michigan, he is the twin brother of Jim Hazewinkel and father of Sam Hazewinkel.

He was a bronze medalist in Brazil at the 1969 World Championships and a silver medalist in Canada at the 1970 World Championships. Hazewinkel was the first American to win a silver medal at the World Championships in Greco-Roman wrestling, the first American to win two world medals in Greco-Roman, and the first American to win two consecutive World medals in Greco-Roman.

His son Sam Hazewinkel was also an Olympic wrestler, making them the first father and son to each make the U.S. Olympic team.
