= Stoyan Nikolov =

Bulgarian wrestler (born 1949)

Medal record

Men's Greco-Roman wrestling

Representing Bulgaria

Olympic Games
Silver medal – second place	1976 Montreal	light-heavyweight

Stoyan Nikolov Ivanov (Bulgarian: Стоян Николов Иванов; born 2 April 1949) is a Bulgarian former wrestler who competed in the 1972 Summer Olympics, in the 1976 Summer Olympics, and in the 1980 Summer Olympics.
