= Daniel Chandler (wrestler) =

American wrestler (born 1951)

Dan Chandler
Personal information
- Full name: Daniel Christie Chandler
- Born: November 21, 1951 (age 74) Minneapolis, Minnesota, U.S.

Sport
- Country: United States
- Sport: Wrestling
- Event: Greco-Roman
- College team: Minnesota
- Club: Haddad Wrestling Club; Minnesota Wrestling Club
- Team: USA
Medal record
Men's Greco-Roman wrestling
Representing United States
Pan American Games
Gold medal – first place	1975 Mexico City	82 kg
Gold medal – first place	1979 San Juan	82 kg
Bronze medal – third place	1983 Caracas	82 kg

Daniel Christie "Dan" Chandler (born November 29, 1951) is an American wrestler. He competed at the 1976 Summer Olympics and the 1984 Summer Olympics. In 2013, Chandler was inducted into the National Wrestling Hall of Fame as a Distinguished Member.
