= Bruce Thompson (wrestler) =

American wrestler (born 1951)

Personal information
- Full name: Bruce Jerome Thompson
- Born: November 13, 1951 (age 74) Morris, Minnesota, U.S.
- Height: 5 ft 5 in (165 cm)
- Weight: 52 kg (115 lb)

Sport
- Country: United States
- Sport: Wrestling
- Event: Greco-Roman
- College team: St. Cloud State
- Club: Minnesota Wrestling Club
- Team: USA
Medal record
Men's Greco-Roman wrestling
Representing United States
Pan American Games
Gold medal – first place	1975 Mexico City	52 kg
Gold medal – first place	1979 San Juan	52 kg

Bruce Jerome Thompson (born November 13, 1951) is an American wrestler. He competed in the men's Greco-Roman 52 kg at the 1976 Summer Olympics.
