= Wrestling in the United States =

- Country: United States
- Governing body: USA Wrestling
- National team: United States Olympics team

International competitions
- Summer Olympics; World Wrestling Championships

Wrestling in the United States include the styles of folkstyle, along with the Olympic styles of freestyle and Greco-Roman. These three styles make up the main forms of amateur wrestling that are contested competitively within the country, not to be confused with the sportive entertainment form of professional wrestling. Folkstyle is a form of wrestling that is only contested in the United States at the youth levels through college. Wrestling in the United States is contested and practiced throughout the country, with the sport having a strong regional presence in areas such as the Midwest, Mid-Atlantic, and Southwest.

== History ==
Folkstyle wrestling is the form of wrestling practiced in Elementary School, Middle School, High School, and (for males) Collegiately in the United States. Freestyle and Greco-Roman wrestling is practiced at all age levels as well, by different wrestling clubs and teams across the country, and by Team USA at international competitions.

Freestyle and Greco-Roman have an ancient history, dating back to the Greek and Roman empires. Wrestling was used for various purposes back then including sport, dominance, and competition. In 708 B.C., wrestling was inducted into the Olympic games where Milo of Croton established his name as one of the greatest Greek athletes ever by winning the Olympic title six times. In addition to this story, wrestling makes another debut in history within Greek mythology as the God Zeus beating his father Cronus in a wrestling match in order to obtain full control over the universe and all that comes with it. Wrestling and its various styles were practiced all over the world for hundreds of years. There are less common practices such as the pankration style, a much more vicious style where it was legal to attack regions such as the eyes, as well as the practice of biting. For these reasons, the pankration style did not take hold. Eventually, the ancient sport migrated over to the United States when the British began to colonize the land.

In comparison to Greco-Roman, freestyle wrestling was first introduced at the 1904 Summer Olympics and was only disputed by American wrestlers. As seen above, freestyle wrestling has less history and tradition compared to Greco-Roman on the international level, but possessed great popularity and developed into a form of entertainment which was performed at fairs and festivals across the United States.

Naturally, the rules were much different then than they were today. Most moves and holds were legal in the sport, regardless of danger it could cause. Throughout the evolution of wrestling, there have been numerous regulations and rules put in place. It wasn't until around 1941, where Art Griffith developed a point system and standardized rules for safety. Some of these regulations include the possible ways of winning a match: disqualification, pin, technical, decision, and default. In addition to this, there are five different avenues to score points in freestyle: takedown (2-5 points), reversal (1 point), out of bounds step (1 point), placing opponent's shoulders at a 45-degree angle (2 points), and misuse of blood time or acting out (1 point). For Greco-Roman points, they are similar but if one opponent touches the legs of another, this will result in a point.

== National Governing board ==
USA Wrestling is the national governing for wrestling in the United States. It is also the representative to the UWW (United World Wrestling) which is the international federation for wrestling and the USOC (United States Olympic Committee). USA wrestling consists of over 233,000 members which includes numerous age ranges, coaches, and officials. It is divided into State Associations where each state has its own set of bylaws for which it operates. USA wrestling is accountable for the assortment of contestants to represent the United States in the Olympic and World competitions.

== Olympics ==
The United States is a powerhouse in Wrestling at the Summer Olympics winning 54 gold medals, 43 silvers and 35 bronzes winning 132 medals. At the 2000 Summer Olympics in Sydney, American wrestler Rulon Gardner scored one of the biggest upsets in wrestling history by defeating three-time defending Olympic gold medalist Aleksandr Karelin to take the gold.
