= James Johnson (wrestler, born 1954) =

American wrestler (born 1954)

Evan Johnson
Personal information
- Full name: James Evan Johnson
- Born: April 7, 1954 (age 72) Cokato, Minnesota, U.S.
- Home town: Orono, Minnesota, U.S.

Sport
- Country: United States
- Sport: Wrestling
- Events: Greco-Roman and Folkstyle
- College team: Minnesota
- Club: Minnesota Wrestling Club
- Team: USA
Medal record
Collegiate Wrestling
Representing the Minnesota Golden Gophers
NCAA Division I Championships
Gold medal – first place	1976 Tucson	190 lb
Silver medal – second place	1977 Norman	190 lb

James "Evan" Johnson (born April 7, 1954) is an American former wrestler. He competed in the men's Greco-Roman 90 kg at the 1976 Summer Olympics. He wrestled collegiately for the University of Minnesota, where we was an NCAA wrestling champion and two-time finalist. Johnson was inducted into the David Bartelma Minnesota Wrestling Hall of Fame in 1995 and the "M" Club Hall of Fame in 2002.
