= Gary Neist =

American wrestler

Personal information
- Born: November 1, 1946 (age 79) Albert Lea, Minnesota, U.S.

Sport
- Country: United States
- Sport: Wrestling
- Event: Greco-Roman
- College team: Luther
- Club: Minnesota Wrestling Club
- Team: USA

Gary Neist (born November 1, 1946) is an American former wrestler who competed in the 1972 Summer Olympics.
