= Sam Hazewinkel =

American wrestler (born 1983)

Personal information
- Born: March 4, 1983 (age 43) Edina, Minnesota, U.S.
- Home town: Pensacola, Florida, U.S.

Sport
- Country: United States
- Sport: Wrestling
- Events: Freestyle, Greco-Roman and Folkstyle
- College team: Oklahoma
- Club: Sunkist Kids Wrestling Club
- Team: USA
Medal record
Men's freestyle wrestling
Representing the United States
Pan American Championships
Gold medal – first place	2012 Colorado Springs	55 kg
Silver medal – second place	2011 Rionegro	55 kg
Men's Greco-Roman wrestling
Representing the United States
University World Championships
Gold medal – first place	2008 Thessaloniki	55 kg
Pan American Championships
Bronze medal – third place	2007 San Salvador	55 kg
Men's collegiate wrestling
Representing the Oklahoma Sooners
NCAA Division I Championships
Silver medal – second place	2007 Auburn Hills	125 lb
Bronze medal – third place	2004 St. Louis	125 lb
Bronze medal – third place	2005 St. Louis	125 lb
Bronze medal – third place	2006 Oklahoma City	125 lb

Sam Hazewinkel (born March 4, 1983) is an American former wrestler who won the 2012 U.S. Olympic Trials and competed at the 2012 Olympics in freestyle 55 kg division. Hazewinkel previously served as head wrestling coach at Oklahoma City University during the 2019 and 2020 seasons. He has since returned to the University of Oklahoma, where he is a Volunteer Assistant Coach with his alma mater.

== High school ==
Hazewinkel completed a 140–0 record while wrestling in high school at Pensacola Christian Academy in Pensacola, Florida. He was a three-time Florida state champion. Hazewinkel was also a two-time Junior National Greco-Roman Champion.

== College ==
As a collegiate wrestler, Hazewinkel was a four-time All-American at the University of Oklahoma, with a best finish of 2nd place at the NCAA Championships.

== International ==
Hazewinkel was a 2008 University World Champion in Greco-Roman wrestling.

He defeated wrestler Nick Simmons 2 matches to 1, in a best of 3 series at the finals of the 2012 U.S. freestyle wrestling Olympic Trials, with a final and deciding period victory of 3–0. At the 2012 Olympics, Hazewinkel lost to in his opening match to Daulet Niyazbekov of Kazakhstan.

Hazewinkel would also represent the United States at the 2018 World Championships in Greco-Roman at 55 kg.

== Family ==
Sam's father David Hazewinkel and uncle Jim Hazewinkel were both Olympic wrestlers. Dave and Sam were the first father and son to each make the U.S. Olympic team.
