= Mike Houck =

American Greco-Roman wrestler (born 1959)

Personal information
- Born: April 29, 1959 (age 67)
- Home town: Robbinsdale, Minnesota, U.S.
- Weight: 90 kg (198 lb)
- Spouse: Bonnie Houck

Sport
- Country: United States
- Sport: Wrestling
- Event: Greco-Roman
- College team: Maranatha Baptist
- Club: Minnesota Wrestling Club
- Team: USA
Medal record
Men's Greco-Roman wrestling
Representing the United States
World Championships
| Gold medal – first place | 1985 Kolbotn | 90 kg |

Mike Houck (born April 29, 1959) is an American former Greco-Roman wrestler. In 1985, he became the first American to win a World Championship in Greco-Roman wrestling, winning the 90 kg title. In 2008, Houck was inducted into the National Wrestling Hall of Fame as a Distinguished Member.

== Early life and education ==
Houck wrestled at Robbinsdale High School in Minnesota. He would then attend Maranatha Baptist Bible College, where he won two National Christian College Athletic Association (NCCAA) titles, before focusing on Greco-Roman wrestling.

== Greco-Roman wrestling career ==
Houck won the first ever World Championship in United States Greco-Roman wrestling history, by winning the 90 kg title at the 1985 World Championships in Kolbotn, Norway.

He won three U.S. Wrestling national Greco-Roman titles and one AAU title. He competed on three U.S. World Teams, and made two World Cup appearances. Houck barely missed the Olympic Games, finishing second at the U.S. Olympic trials in 1984 and 1988.
