= Caylor Williams =

American wrestler (born 1991)

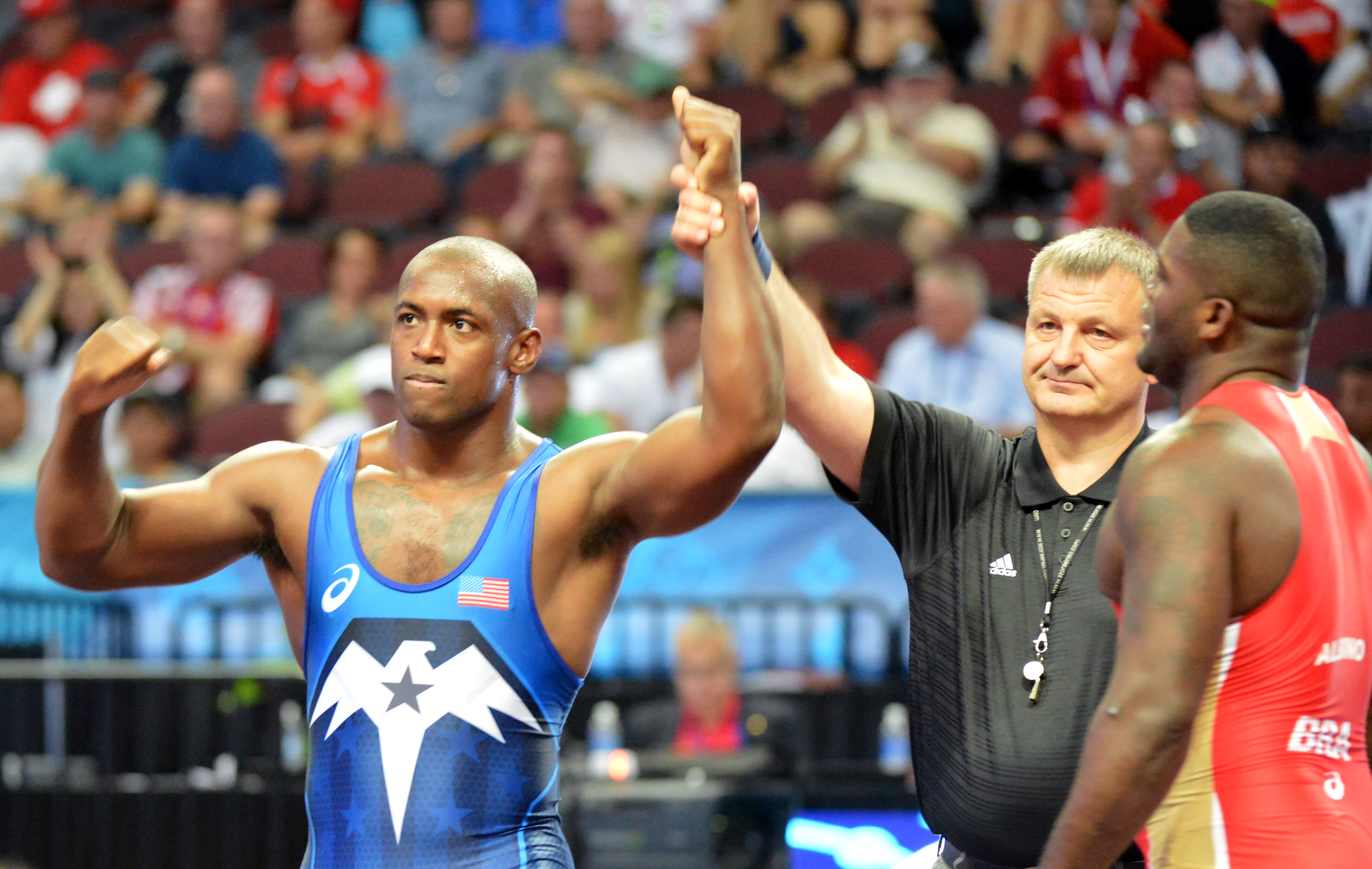
- Williams in blue at 2015 World Championships

Personal information
- Full name: Caylor Ryan Williams
- Born: January 7, 1991 (age 35) Palm Bay, Florida, U.S.

Sport
- Country: United States
- Sport: Wrestling
- Events: Greco-Roman and Folkstyle
- College team: UNC Greensboro
- Club: U.S. Army WCAP
- Team: USA
Medal record
Men's Greco-Roman wrestling
Representing the United States
Pan American Championships
Bronze medal – third place	2013 Panama City	96 kg
Bronze medal – third place	2015 Santiago de Chile	98 kg
US Open Championships
Gold medal – first place	2014 Las Vegas	98 kg
Gold medal – first place	2015 Las Vegas	98 kg
Dave Schultz Memorial International
Silver medal – second place	2015 Colorado Springs	98 kg
Men's collegiate wrestling
Representing the UNC Greensboro Spartans
SoCon Championships
Gold medal – first place	2011 Boone	197 lb

Caylor Ryan Williams (born January 7, 1991) is an American former Greco-Roman wrestler. He represented the United States at the World Championships in Greco-Roman wrestling at 96 kg in 2013, and 98 kg in 2014 and 2015.

== High School ==
Williams attended Palm Bay High School in Melbourne, Florida. His senior year, he posted a 50–0 record and won the 2009 Florida 3A 189-pound state championship. Williams also finished third at the state championships his junior year.

== College ==
He wrestled collegiately at the University of North Carolina at Greensboro. Williams redshirt freshman year, he won the SoCon championship at 197-pounds, qualified for the 2011 NCAA Division I Championships and also earned Southern Conference Freshman of the Year honors. Three days before the NCAA championships, it was announced that UNC Greensboro was dropping their wrestling program. Instead of transferring, Williams and a handful of his teammates stayed at the school, training for the YES Wrestling Club in Greco-Roman wrestling. They trained under former UNC Greensboro head coach, Jason Loukides, who was a past U.S. World Team member in Greco-Roman.

== Senior level ==
Williams latter became an E-4 with the Colorado Army National Guard, where he trained with the U.S. Army World Class Athlete Program, following his graduation from UNC Greensboro.

He made his first U.S. World Team in Greco-Roman in 2013 at 96 kg. Williams would also win the U.S. World Team spot in Greco-Roman at 98 kg in 2014 and 2015. Williams finished runner-up at the 2016 Olympic Trials at 98 kg, losing to Joe Rau.

Other Greco-Roman wrestling accomplishments for Williams include being a bronze medalist at the Pan American Championships in 2013 and 2015.
