= Larry Lyden =

American wrestler

Personal information
- Born: November 11, 1943 (age 82) Minneapolis, Minnesota, U.S.

Sport
- Country: United States
- Sport: Wrestling
- Event: Greco-Roman
- College team: Wisconsin–Oshkosh
- Club: Minnesota Wrestling Club
- Team: USA

Larry Lyden (born November 11, 1943) is an American wrestler. He competed in the men's Greco-Roman 78 kg at the 1968 Summer Olympics.
