= Jake Deitchler =

American wrestler (born 1989)

Jacob Deitchler
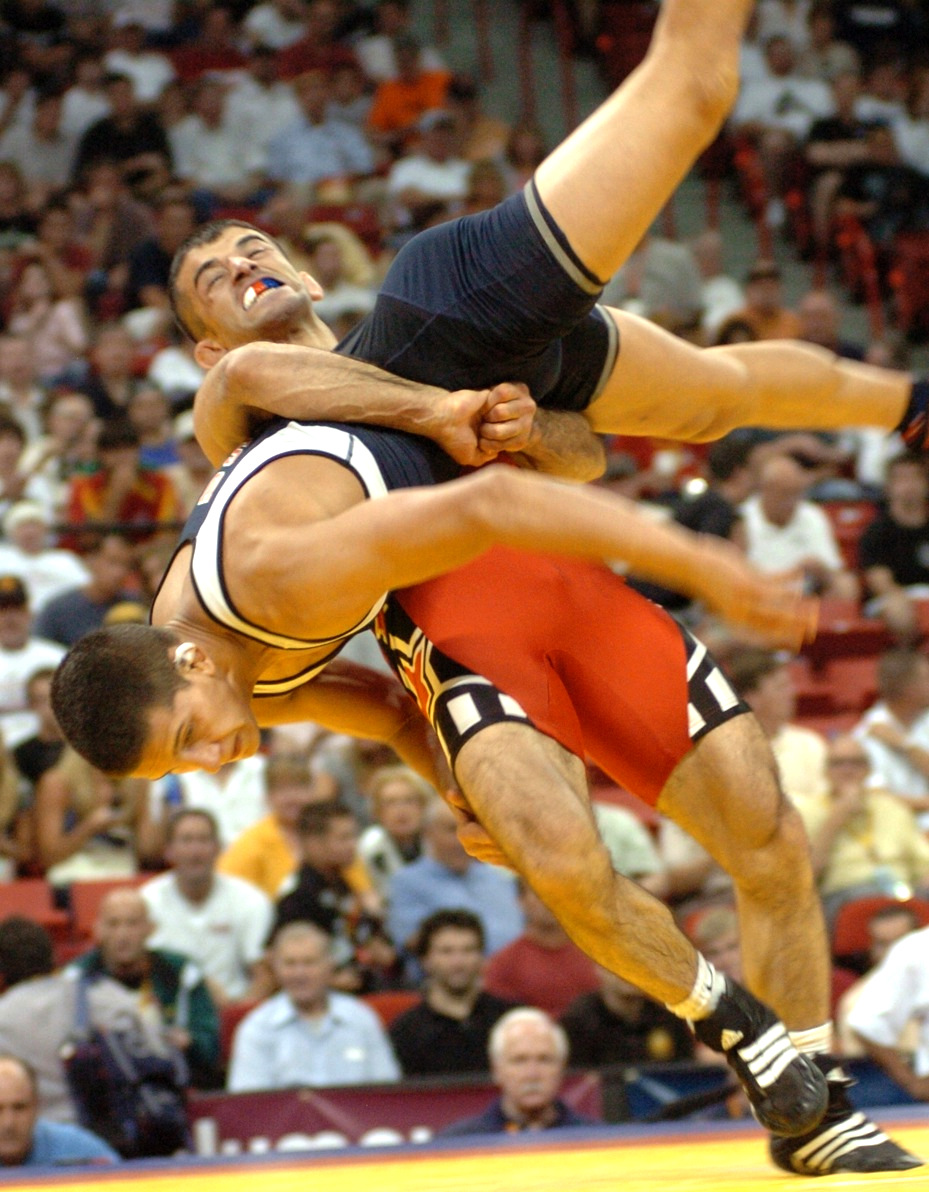
- Deitchler (in blue) wrestling Faruk Sahin (in red) at the 2008 U.S. Olympic trials

Personal information
- Born: December 1, 1989 (age 36) Mayville, North Dakota, U.S.
- Home town: Ramsey, Minnesota, U.S.
- Height: 5 ft 8 in (173 cm)
- Weight: 66 kg (146 lb)

Sport
- Country: United States
- Sport: Greco-Roman and Folkstyle
- College team: Minnesota
- Club: Minnesota Storm
- Team: USA

Jacob Deitchler (born December 1, 1989) is an American former wrestler who competed for the United States Greco-Roman wrestling team at the 2008 Summer Olympics. Deitchler, from Ramsey, Minnesota, is a former University of Minnesota wrestler and became the third wrestler in American history to go directly from high school and earn a spot on an Olympic Team.

== Competitive career ==
Deitchler began wrestling in first grade in Coon Rapids, Minnesota and moved to Anoka, Minnesota to wrestle in the sixth grade. This eventually lead to meeting his mentor and coach, Anoka High School alumnus Brandon Paulson. While at Anoka, Deitchler was a three-time Minnesota state wrestling champion.

He stunned the Greco-Roman wrestling community in the U.S. in 2008, when he won an Olympic berth in the 145.5-pound weight class, becoming the first high school wrestler in 32 years to make the U.S. Olympic team in his sport. In the Beijing Olympics, Deitchler lost both his matches in the 66 kg weight class, the first to the eventual silver medalist Kanatbek Begaliev of Kyrgyzstan and then to Armen Vardanyan of Ukraine, who later received the bronze medal. He finished the Olympics in 12th place in his weight class.

Deitchler left the Minnesota Golden Gopher wrestling team to train at the Olympic Training Center to pursue international competition in 2008–2009, but returned to the Gophers for the 2009–2010 season, finishing 8–2 in open meets. In January 2010, Deitchler was suspended by the NCAA for the rest of the 2009–2010 for taking $4,000 in prize money while wrestling internationally following the Olympics. He then took the entire 2010–2011 season off after experiencing continued concussion symptoms. After starting the 2011–2012 season ranked as high as 8th nationally in the 157-pound weight class, on January 4, 2012 Deitchler announced he was retiring from competitive wrestling due to lingering effects from concussions. After receiving his first concussion when he was seven in a dirt bike accident, Deitchler estimates that he had suffered 10 to 12 concussions over the next 15 years and was advised by his physician to immediately stop wrestling after experiencing headaches and fogginess following his last dual meet match on November 20, 2011.

He would continue to help with coaching young wrestlers alongside Brandon Paulson and former Gophers wrestler Chad Erikson.

== Personal life ==
Dietchler lives in the Twin Cities suburb of St. Michael, Minnesota with his wife.
