= 1985 World Wrestling Championships =

Freestyle
- Host city: Budapest, Hungary
- Dates: 10–13 October 1985

Greco-Roman
- Host city: Kolbotn, Norway
- Dates: 8–11 August 1985

Champions
- Freestyle: Soviet Union
- Greco-Roman: Soviet Union

The following is the final results of the 1985 World Wrestling Championships. Freestyle competition were held in Budapest, Hungary and Greco-Roman competition were held in Kolbotn, Norway.

== Medal table ==
Rank	Nation	Gold	Silver	Bronze	Total
1	Soviet Union	8	6	3	17
2	Bulgaria	4	2	5	11
3	United States	3	2	2	7
4	Romania	1	2	2	5
5	Poland	1	1	0	2
6	Cuba	1	0	1	2
6	Norway	1	0	1	2
8	North Korea	1	0	0	1
9	Hungary	0	2	1	3
9	Mongolia	0	2	1	3
11	Canada	0	1	1	2
11	East Germany	0	1	1	2
13	Iran	0	1	0	1
14	Finland	0	0	1	1
14	Japan	0	0	1	1
Totals (15 entries)		20	20	20	60

== Team ranking ==
Rank	Men's freestyle		Men's Greco-Roman	
Rank	Team	Points	Team	Points
1	Soviet Union	49	Soviet Union	48
2	United States	30	Bulgaria	34
3	Bulgaria	28	Romania	30
4	Mongolia	18	Poland	19
5	Hungary	17	Hungary	15
6	East Germany	12	United States	14

== Medal summary ==
=== Freestyle ===
Event	Gold	Silver	Bronze
48 kg	Kim Chol-han; North Korea	Majid Torkan; Iran	Vasily Gogolev; Soviet Union
52 kg	Valentin Yordanov; Bulgaria	Minatulla Daibov; Soviet Union	Mitsuru Sato; Japan
57 kg	Sergey Beloglazov; Soviet Union	Kevin Darkus; United States	Georgi Kalchev; Bulgaria
62 kg	Viktor Alekseev; Soviet Union	Avirmediin Enkhee; Mongolia	Alben Kumbarov; Bulgaria
68 kg	Arsen Fadzaev; Soviet Union	Buyandelgeriin Bold; Mongolia	Pat Sullivan; Canada
74 kg	Raúl Cascaret; Cuba	Dave Schultz; United States	Luvsangiin Enkhbayar; Mongolia
82 kg	Mark Schultz; United States	Aleksandar Nanev; Bulgaria	Aleksandr Tambovtsev; Soviet Union
90 kg	Bill Scherr; United States	Roland Dudziak; East Germany	Kamen Tomov; Bulgaria
100 kg	Leri Khabelov; Soviet Union	Clark Davis; Canada	Uwe Neupert; East Germany
130 kg	David Gobejishvili; Soviet Union	József Balla; Hungary	Bruce Baumgartner; United States

=== Greco-Roman ===
Event	Gold	Silver	Bronze
48 kg	Mahaddin Allahverdiyev; Soviet Union	Bratan Tsenov; Bulgaria	Csaba Vadász; Hungary
52 kg	Jon Rønningen; Norway	Minseit Tazetdinov; Soviet Union	Mihai Cișmaș; Romania
57 kg	Stoyan Balov; Bulgaria	Oganes Arutunyan; Soviet Union	Amadoris González; Cuba
62 kg	Zhivko Vangelov; Bulgaria	Bogusław Klozik; Poland	Gheorghe Savu; Romania
68 kg	Ștefan Negrișan; Romania	Mikhail Prokudin; Soviet Union	James Martinez; United States
74 kg	Mikhail Mamiashvili; Soviet Union	Ștefan Rusu; Romania	Jouko Salomäki; Finland
82 kg	Bogdan Daras; Poland	Abdulbasir Battalov; Soviet Union	Klaus Mysen; Norway
90 kg	Mike Houck; United States	Igor Kanygin; Soviet Union	Atanas Komchev; Bulgaria
100 kg	Andrey Dimitrov; Bulgaria	Tamás Gáspár; Hungary	Anatoly Fedorenko; Soviet Union
130 kg	Igor Rostorotsky; Soviet Union	Ioan Grigoraș; Romania	Rangel Gerovski; Bulgaria
