= Jim Hazewinkel =

American wrestler (born 1944)

Personal information
- Full name: James Arthur Hazewinkel
- Born: September 8, 1944 (age 81) Detroit, Michigan, U.S.
- Home town: Anoka, Minnesota, U.S.

Sport
- Country: United States
- Sport: Wrestling
- Events: Greco-Roman and Folkstyle
- College team: St. Cloud State
- Club: U.S. Army and Minnesota Wrestling Club
- Team: USA
Medal record
Collegiate Wrestling
Representing the St. Cloud State Huskies
NAIA Championships
| Gold medal – first place | 1963 Bloomsburg | 115 lb |
| Gold medal – first place | 1964 Spearfish | 115 lb |
| Gold medal – first place | 1965 Terre Haute | 123 lb |
| Gold medal – first place | 1967 Lock Haven | 123 lb |

James Arthur "Jim" Hazewinkel (born September 8, 1944) is an American former wrestler who competed in the 1968 Summer Olympics and in the 1972 Summer Olympics in Greco-Roman wrestling. In college, Hazewinkel was a four-time NAIA wrestling champion at St. Cloud State College. Born in Detroit, Michigan, he is the twin brother of David Hazewinkel and uncle of Sam Hazewinkel.
