= Patrick Marcy =

American wrestler (born 1950)

Personal information
- Born: October 6, 1950 (age 75) Minneapolis, Minnesota, U.S.

Sport
- Country: United States
- Sport: Wrestling
- Events: Greco-Roman and Folkstyle
- College team: Augsburg
- Club: Minnesota Wrestling Club
- Team: USA
Medal record
Men's Greco-Roman wrestling
Representing the United States
Pan American Games
Gold medal – first place	1975 Mexico City	68 kg
Collegiate Wrestling
Representing Augsburg
NAIA Championships
Gold medal – first place	1972 Klamath Falls	150 lb

Patrick Marcy (born October 6, 1950) is an American wrestler. He competed in the men's Greco-Roman 68 kg at the 1976 Summer Olympics.
