= Darko Nišavić =

Serbian wrestler (1952–2005)

Personal information
- Born: May 28, 1952 Zrenjanin, Yugoslavia
- Died: May 9, 2005 (aged 52) Zrenjanin, Serbia

Sport
- Sport: Greco-Roman wrestling
Medal record
Representing Yugoslavia
European Championships
Bronze medal – third place	1972 Katowice	90 kg
Mediterranean Games
Gold medal – first place	1979 Split	90 kg
Silver medal – second place	1975 Algiers	90 kg
Summer Universiade
Silver medal – second place	1973 Moscow	90 kg
Silver medal – second place	1977 Sofia	90 kg

Darko Nišavić (May 28, 1952 – May 9, 2005) was a Serbian wrestler who competed in the 1976 Summer Olympics where he won 4th place and in the 1980 Summer Olympics.
