= Gary Alexander (wrestler) =

American wrestler (born 1944)

Personal information
- Born: February 10, 1944 (age 82) Minneapolis, Minnesota, U.S.

Sport
- Country: United States
- Sport: Wrestling
- Event: Greco-Roman
- College team: Minnesota
- Club: Minnesota Wrestling Club
- Team: USA

Gary Alexander (born February 10, 1944) is an American wrestler. Alexander was in line to compete at the 1972 Summer Olympics, but was shot in the jaw two months prior to the Games. Alexander would recover by the next Olympic Games, where he competed in the men's Greco-Roman 62 kg at the 1976 Summer Olympics.
