= Rob Hermann =

American wrestler and coach (born 1957)

Personal information
- Born: January 15, 1957 (age 69) Chicago, Illinois, U.S.
- Home town: Crystal River, Florida, U.S.

Sport
- Country: United States
- Sport: Wrestling
- Event: Greco-Roman
- Club: U.S. Navy
- Team: USA
Medal record
Men's Greco-Roman wrestling
Representing the United States
Pan American Games
Bronze medal – third place	1983 Caracas	57 kg

Robert Hermann (born January 15, 1957) is an American former Greco-Roman wrestler and coach. He competed on three US Greco-Roman World Teams and was a bronze medalist at the 1983 Pan American Games. Hermann also won 11 Armed Forces title, competing for the U.S. Navy. In 2003, he was inducted into the Florida Chapter of the National Wrestling Hall of Fame.
