= Peru at the 1996 Summer Olympics =

- IOC code: PER
- NOC: Peruvian Olympic Committee
- Website: www.coperu.org (in Spanish)

in Atlanta
- Competitors: 29 (15 men and 14 women) in 8 sports
- Flag bearer: Juan Giha
- Medals: Gold 0 Silver 0 Bronze 0 Total 0

Summer Olympics appearances (overview)
- 1900; 1904–1932; 1936; 1948; 1952; 1956; 1960; 1964; 1968; 1972; 1976; 1980; 1984; 1988; 1992; 1996; 2000; 2004; 2008; 2012; 2016; 2020; 2024

Peru competed at the 1996 Summer Olympics in Atlanta, United States.

== Competitors ==
The following is the list of number of competitors in the Games.

Sport	Men	Women	Total
Athletics	4	1	5
Badminton	1	0	1
Boxing	1	–	1
Shooting	3	0	3
Swimming	1	1	2
Table tennis	0	2	2
Volleyball	0	10	10
Wrestling	5	–	5
Total	15	14	29

== Athletics ==
Men
Track and road events

Athlete	Event	Heat		Quarterfinal		Semifinal		Final	
Athlete	Event	Result	Rank	Result	Rank	Result	Rank	Result	Rank
Javier Verne	100 m	10.91	91	Did not advance					
Miguel Mallqui	Marathon	—N/a						2:25:56	71
José Riesco	110 metres hurdles	14.29	54	Did not advance					

Field events

Athlete	Event	Qualification		Final	
Athlete	Event	Distance	Position	Distance	Position
Hugo Muñoz	High jump	NM		Did not advance	

Women
Track and road events

Athlete	Event	Heat		Quarterfinal		Semifinal		Final	
Athlete	Event	Result	Rank	Result	Rank	Result	Rank	Result	Rank
Marilú Salazar	Marathon	—N/a						2:48:58	54

== Badminton ==
Men

Athlete	Event	Round of 64	Round of 32	Round of 16	Quarterfinals	Semifinals	Final	
Athlete	Event	Opposition Result	Opposition Result	Opposition Result	Opposition Result	Opposition Result	Opposition Result	Rank
Mario Carulla	Singles	Wapp (SUI); L 8–15, 15–10, 11–15	Did not advance					

== Boxing ==
Athlete	Event	Round of 32	Round of 16	Quarterfinals	Semifinals	Final	
Athlete	Event	Opposition Result	Opposition Result	Opposition Result	Opposition Result	Opposition Result	Rank
Alberto Rossel	Light flyweight	Yang (CHN); L 7–16	Did not advance				

== Shooting ==
Men

Athlete	Event	Qualification		Final	
Athlete	Event	Points	Rank	Points	Rank
Esteban Boza	Skeet	116	38	Did not advance	
Francisco Boza	Trap	114	49	Did not advance	
Francisco Boza	Double trap	135	12	Did not advance	
Juan Giha	Skeet	115	42	Did not advance	

== Swimming ==
Men

Athlete	Event	Heats		Final A/B	
Athlete	Event	Time	Rank	Time	Rank
Jorge Arias	100 m breaststroke	1:06.03	39	Did not advance	

Women

Athlete	Event	Heats		Final A/B	
Athlete	Event	Time	Rank	Time	Rank
Maritza Chiaway	200 m freestyle	2:07.80	37	Did not advance	
Maritza Chiaway	400 m freestyle	4:27.11	36	Did not advance	
Maritza Chiaway	800 m freestyle	9:09.12	26	Did not advance	

== Table tennis ==
Women

Athlete	Event	Group Stage				Round of 16	Quarterfinal	Semifinal	Final	
Athlete	Event	Opposition Result	Opposition Result	Opposition Result	Rank	Opposition Result	Opposition Result	Opposition Result	Opposition Result	Rank
Eliana González	Singles	Tu (PRK); L 0–2	Ryu (KOR); L 0–2	Svensson (SWE); L 0–2	4	Did not advance				
Eliana González; Milagritos Gorriti	Doubles	Chai / Chan (HKG); L 0–2	Svensson / Pettersson (SWE); L 0–2	Tu / Kim (PRK); L 0–2	4	—N/a	Did not advance			

== Volleyball ==
=== Indoor ===
Summary

Team	Event	Group stage						Quarterfinal	Semifinal	Final / BM	
Team	Event	Opposition Score	Opposition Score	Opposition Score	Opposition Score	Opposition Score	Rank	Opposition Score	Opposition Score	Opposition Score	Rank
Peru women's	Women's tournament	Brazil; L 0–3	Germany; L 0–3	Cuba; L 0–3	Russia; L 0–3	Canada; L 2–3	6	Did not advance			

Team roster

- Sara Joya
- Iris Falcón
- Verónica Contreras
- Paola Ramos
- Milagros Cámere
- Milagros Moy
- Sandra Rodriguez
- Luren Baylon
- Yulissa Zamudio
- Yolanda Delgado
- Leyla Chihuán
- Marjorie Vilchez

Head coach: Park Jong-duk

Group play

Pos	Team	Pld	W	L	Pts	SW	SL	SR	SPW	SPL	SPR	Qualification
1	Brazil	5	5	0	10	15	1	15.000	238	121	1.967	Quarterfinals
2	Russia	5	4	1	9	12	4	3.000	217	140	1.550	Quarterfinals
3	Cuba	5	3	2	8	10	6	1.667	196	156	1.256	Quarterfinals
4	Germany	5	2	3	7	7	9	0.778	163	191	0.853	Quarterfinals
5	Canada	5	1	4	6	3	14	0.214	156	239	0.653	
6	Peru	5	0	5	5	2	15	0.133	129	252	0.512	

20 July 1996	Brazil	3–0	Peru
20 July 1996	(15–7, 15–1, 15–5); Report

22 July 1996	Germany	3–0	Peru
22 July 1996	(15–11, 15–6, 15–3); Report

24 July 1996	Peru	0–3	Cuba
24 July 1996	(2–15, 5–15, 10–15); Report

26 July 1996	Russia	3–0	Peru
26 July 1996	(15–11, 15–8, 15–1); Report

28 July 1996	Peru	2–3	Canada
28 July 1996	(17–16, 6–15, 15–11, 9–15, 12–15); Report

== Wrestling ==
Greco-Roman

Athlete	Event	Round of 32	Round of 16	Quarterfinals	Semifinals	Repechage					Final	
Athlete	Event	Round of 32	Round of 16	Quarterfinals	Semifinals	Round 1	Round 2	Round 3	Round 4	Round 5	Final	
Athlete	Event	Opposition Result	Opposition Result	Opposition Result	Opposition Result	Opposition Result	Opposition Result	Opposition Result	Opposition Result	Opposition Result	Opposition Result	Rank
Jorge Yllescas	–48 kg	Agatzanian (GRE); L 0–10	Did not advance			Costantino (ITA); L 0–10	Did not advance					
Joel Basaldua	–52 kg	Paulson (USA); L Fall	Did not advance			Valentin (DOM); L Fall	Did not advance					
Félix Isisola	–82 kg	Zander (GER); L 0–10	Did not advance			Karila (FIN); L 0–11	Did not advance					
Lucio Vásquez	–90 kg	Konstantinidis (GRE); L 0–10	Did not advance			Švec (CZE); L 0–10	Did not advance					

Freestyle

Athlete	Event	Round of 32	Round of 16	Quarterfinals	Semifinals	Repechage					Final	
Athlete	Event	Round of 32	Round of 16	Quarterfinals	Semifinals	Round 1	Round 2	Round 3	Round 4	Round 5	Final	
Athlete	Event	Opposition Result	Opposition Result	Opposition Result	Opposition Result	Opposition Result	Opposition Result	Opposition Result	Opposition Result	Opposition Result	Opposition Result	Rank
Enrique Cubas	–62 kg	Krzesiak (POL); W 7–7	Jang (KOR); L 0–3	Did not advance		—N/a	Demeter (HUN); L 1–11	Did not advance				

== See also ==
- Peru at the 1995 Pan American Games
