= Wrestling at the 1996 Summer Olympics – Men's Greco-Roman 52 kg =

Men's Greco-Roman 52 kg at the Games of the XXVI Olympiad
- Venue: Georgia World Congress Center
- Dates: 22–23 July 1996
- Competitors: 20 from 20 nations

Medalists
| 1st place, gold medalist(s) | | Armen Nazaryan | Armenia |
| 2nd place, silver medalist(s) | | Brandon Paulson | United States |
| 3rd place, bronze medalist(s) | | Andriy Kalashnikov | Ukraine |

The men's Greco-Roman 52 kilograms at the 1996 Summer Olympics as part of the wrestling program were held at the Georgia World Congress Center from July 22 to July 23. The gold and silver medalists were determined by the final match of the main single-elimination bracket. The losers advanced to the repechage. These matches determined the bronze medalist for the event.

== Results ==
=== Round 1 ===
| | Score | | CP |
1/16 finals
| Valentin Rebegea (ROM) | 0–6 Fall | Dariusz Jabłoński (POL) | 0–4 TO |
| Samvel Danielyan (RUS) | 11–4 | Shamsiddin Khudoyberdiev (UZB) | 3–1 PP |
| Pappu Yadav (IND) | 0–10 | Ha Tae-yeon (KOR) | 0–4 ST |
| Andriy Kalashnikov (UKR) | 0–10 | Armen Nazaryan (ARM) | 0–4 ST |
| Jon Rønningen (NOR) | 0–5 | Lázaro Rivas (CUB) | 0–3 PO |
| Alfred Ter-Mkrtchyan (GER) | 1–3 | Khaled Al-Faraj (SYR) | 1–3 PP |
| Yordan Anev (BUL) | 11–0 | Tiebiri Godswill (NGR) | 4–0 ST |
| Ruslan Vartanov (LTU) | 1–4 | Nurym Dyusenov (KAZ) | 1–3 PP |
| Ibad Akhmedov (BLR) | 11–0 | Ulises Valentin (DOM) | 4–0 ST |
| Joel Basaldúa (PER) | 0–6 Fall | Brandon Paulson (USA) | 0–4 TO |

=== Round 2 ===
| | Score | | CP |
1/8 finals
| Dariusz Jabłoński (POL) | 0–8 | Samvel Danielyan (RUS) | 0–3 PO |
| Ha Tae-yeon (KOR) | 2–12 | Armen Nazaryan (ARM) | 1–4 SP |
| Lázaro Rivas (CUB) | 5–0 | Khaled Al-Faraj (SYR) | 3–0 PO |
| Yordan Anev (BUL) | 9–6 | Nurym Dyusenov (KAZ) | 3–1 PP |
| Ibad Akhmedov (BLR) | 1–6 | Brandon Paulson (USA) | 1–3 PP |
Repechage
| Valentin Rebegea (ROM) | 12–0 Fall | Shamsiddin Khudoyberdiev (UZB) | 4–0 TO |
| Pappu Yadav (IND) | 0–11 | Andriy Kalashnikov (UKR) | 0–4 ST |
| Jon Rønningen (NOR) | 0–9 | Alfred Ter-Mkrtchyan (GER) | 0–3 PO |
| Tiebiri Godswill (NGR) | 0–4 | Ruslan Vartanov (LTU) | 0–3 PO |
| Ulises Valentin (DOM) | 14–1 Fall | Joel Basaldúa (PER) | 4–0 TO |

=== Round 3 ===
| | Score | | CP |
Quarterfinals
| Samvel Danielyan (RUS) | 0–3 | Armen Nazaryan (ARM) | 0–3 PO |
| Lázaro Rivas (CUB) | | Bye | |
| Yordan Anev (BUL) | | Bye | |
| Brandon Paulson (USA) | | Bye | |
Repechage
| Valentin Rebegea (ROM) | 1–3 | Andriy Kalashnikov (UKR) | 1–3 PP |
| Alfred Ter-Mkrtchyan (GER) | 8–0 | Ruslan Vartanov (LTU) | 3–0 PO |
| Ulises Valentin (DOM) | 0–3 Fall | Dariusz Jabłoński (POL) | 0–4 TO |
| Ha Tae-yeon (KOR) | 10–0 | Khaled Al-Faraj (SYR) | 4–0 ST |
| Nurym Dyusenov (KAZ) | 5–4 | Ibad Akhmedov (BLR) | 3–1 PP |

=== Round 4 ===
| | Score | | CP |
Semifinals
| Armen Nazaryan (ARM) | 7–1 | Lázaro Rivas (CUB) | 3–1 PP |
| Yordan Anev (BUL) | 2–6 | Brandon Paulson (USA) | 1–3 PP |
Repechage
| Andriy Kalashnikov (UKR) | 3–0 Fall | Alfred Ter-Mkrtchyan (GER) | 4–0 TO |
| Dariusz Jabłoński (POL) | 3–2 | Ha Tae-yeon (KOR) | 3–1 PP |
| Nurym Dyusenov (KAZ) | 0–11 | Samvel Danielyan (RUS) | 0–4 ST |

=== Round 5 ===
| | Score | | CP |
Repechage
| Andriy Kalashnikov (UKR) | 8–5 | Dariusz Jabłoński (POL) | 3–1 PP |
| Samvel Danielyan (RUS) | | Bye | |

=== Round 6 ===
| | Score | | CP |
Repechage
| Lázaro Rivas (CUB) | 8–9 | Samvel Danielyan (RUS) | 1–3 PP |
| Andriy Kalashnikov (UKR) | 5–0 | Yordan Anev (BUL) | 3–0 PO |

=== Finals ===
| | Score | | CP |
Classification 7th–8th
| Dariusz Jabłoński (POL) | 2–3 | Ha Tae-yeon (KOR) | 1–3 PP |
Classification 5th–6th
| Lázaro Rivas (CUB) | 5–0 | Yordan Anev (BUL) | 3–0 PO |
Bronze medal match
| Samvel Danielyan (RUS) | 1–4 | Andriy Kalashnikov (UKR) | 1–3 PP |
Gold medal match
| Armen Nazaryan (ARM) | 5–1 | Brandon Paulson (USA) | 3–1 PP |

== Final standing ==
| Rank | Athlete |
|---|---|
| 1st place, gold medalist(s) | Armen Nazaryan (ARM) |
| 2nd place, silver medalist(s) | Brandon Paulson (USA) |
| 3rd place, bronze medalist(s) | Andriy Kalashnikov (UKR) |
| 4 | Samvel Danielyan (RUS) |
| 5 | Lázaro Rivas (CUB) |
| 6 | Yordan Anev (BUL) |
| 7 | Ha Tae-yeon (KOR) |
| 8 | Dariusz Jabłoński (POL) |
| 9 | Alfred Ter-Mkrtchyan (GER) |
| 10 | Nurym Dyusenov (KAZ) |
| 11 | Ibad Akhmedov (BLR) |
| 12 | Valentin Rebegea (ROM) |
| 13 | Ulises Valentin (DOM) |
| 14 | Ruslan Vartanov (LTU) |
| 15 | Khaled Al-Faraj (SYR) |
| 16 | Shamsiddin Khudoyberdiev (UZB) |
| 17 | Pappu Yadav (IND) |
| 17 | Tiebiri Godswill (NGR) |
| 17 | Jon Rønningen (NOR) |
| 17 | Joel Basaldúa (PER) |
