= Wrestling at the 2000 Summer Olympics – Men's Greco-Roman 54 kg =

Men's Greco-Roman 54 kg at the Games of the XXVII Olympiad
- Venue: Sydney Convention and Exhibition Centre
- Date: 24–26 September 2000
- Competitors: 20 from 20 nations

Medalists
1st place, gold medalist(s)		Sim Kwon-ho	South Korea
2nd place, silver medalist(s)		Lázaro Rivas	Cuba
3rd place, bronze medalist(s)		Kang Yong-gyun	North Korea

The men's Greco-Roman 54 kilograms at the 2000 Summer Olympics as part of the wrestling program was held at the Sydney Convention and Exhibition Centre from September 24 to 26. The competition held with an elimination system of three or four wrestlers in each pool, with the winners qualify for the quarterfinals, semifinals and final by way of direct elimination.

== Schedule ==
All times are Australian Eastern Daylight Time (UTC+11:00)

Date	Time	Event
24 September 2000	09:30	Round 1
24 September 2000	09:30	Round 2
24 September 2000	17:00	Round 3
25 September 2000	09:30	Quarterfinals
25 September 2000	17:00	Semifinals
26 September 2000	17:00	Finals

== Results ==
=== Elimination pools ===
==== Pool 1 ====
Pos	Athlete	Pld	W	L	CP	TP	Qualification
1	Alfred Ter-Mkrtchyan (GER)	2	2	0	6	8	Knockout round
2	Aleksandr Tsertsvadze (GEO)	2	1	1	3	4	
3	Tero Katajisto (FIN)	2	0	2	1	2	

Source: Official Report

	Score		CP
Alfred Ter-Mkrtchyan (GER)	5–0	Aleksandr Tsertsvadze (GEO)	3–0 PO
Tero Katajisto (FIN)	0–3	Alfred Ter-Mkrtchyan (GER)	0–3 PO
Aleksandr Tsertsvadze (GEO)	4–2	Tero Katajisto (FIN)	3–1 PP

==== Pool 2 ====
Pos	Athlete	Pld	W	L	CP	TP	Qualification
1	Sim Kwon-ho (KOR)	2	2	0	7	12	Knockout round
2	Rakymzhan Assembekov (KAZ)	2	1	1	5	9	
3	Dariusz Jabłoński (POL)	2	0	2	0	2	

Source: Official Report

	Score		CP
Dariusz Jabłoński (POL)	0–10	Sim Kwon-ho (KOR)	0–4 ST
Rakymzhan Assembekov (KAZ)	7–2 Fall	Dariusz Jabłoński (POL)	4–0 TO
Sim Kwon-ho (KOR)	2–2	Rakymzhan Assembekov (KAZ)	3–1 PP

==== Pool 3 ====
Pos	Athlete	Pld	W	L	CP	TP	Qualification
1	Wang Hui (CHN)	2	2	0	6	16	Knockout round
2	Hassan Rangraz (IRI)	2	1	1	4	10	
3	Petr Švehla (CZE)	2	0	2	2	5	

Source: Official Report

	Score		CP
Petr Švehla (CZE)	3–8	Wang Hui (CHN)	1–3 PP
Hassan Rangraz (IRI)	8–2	Petr Švehla (CZE)	3–1 PP
Wang Hui (CHN)	8–2	Hassan Rangraz (IRI)	3–1 PP

==== Pool 4 ====
Pos	Athlete	Pld	W	L	CP	TP	Qualification
1	Kang Yong-gyun (PRK)	2	1	1	4	17	Knockout round
2	Aleksey Shevtsov (RUS)	2	1	1	4 (Note: Head-to-head result: RUS 3–1 ROM.)	16	
3	Marian Sandu (ROM)	2	1	1	4	16	

Source: Official Report
Notes:

	Score		CP
Kang Yong-gyun (PRK)	7–8	Marian Sandu (ROM)	1–3 PP
Aleksey Shevtsov (RUS)	5–10	Kang Yong-gyun (PRK)	1–3 PP
Marian Sandu (ROM)	8–11	Aleksey Shevtsov (RUS)	1–3 PP

==== Pool 5 ====
Pos	Athlete	Pld	W	L	CP	TP	Qualification
1	Andriy Kalashnikov (UKR)	3	3	0	11	30	Knockout round
2	Uran Kalilov (KGZ)	3	2	1	7	13	
3	Mohamed Abou El-Ela (EGY)	3	1	2	5	8	
4	Steven Mays (USA)	3	0	3	1	3	

Source: Official Report

	Score		CP
Uran Kalilov (KGZ)	10–0	Steven Mays (USA)	4–0 ST
Mohamed Abou El-Ela (EGY)	2–16	Andriy Kalashnikov (UKR)	1–4 SP
Uran Kalilov (KGZ)	3–1	Mohamed Abou El-Ela (EGY)	3–1 PP
Steven Mays (USA)	0–11	Andriy Kalashnikov (UKR)	0–4 ST
Uran Kalilov (KGZ)	0–3	Andriy Kalashnikov (UKR)	0–3 PO
Steven Mays (USA)	3–5	Mohamed Abou El-Ela (EGY)	1–3 PP

==== Pool 6 ====
Pos	Athlete	Pld	W	L	CP	TP	Qualification
1	Lázaro Rivas (CUB)	3	3	0	11	31	Knockout round
2	Natig Eyvazov (AZE)	3	2	1	8	14	
3	Ercan Yıldız (TUR)	3	1	2	4	16	
4	Jotham Pellew (NZL)	3	0	3	0	0	

Source: Official Report

	Score		CP
Ercan Yıldız (TUR)	0–10	Lázaro Rivas (CUB)	0–4 ST
Jotham Pellew (NZL)	0–10	Natig Eyvazov (AZE)	0–4 ST
Ercan Yıldız (TUR)	16–0	Jotham Pellew (NZL)	4–0 ST
Lázaro Rivas (CUB)	6–1	Natig Eyvazov (AZE)	3–1 PP
Ercan Yıldız (TUR)	0–3	Natig Eyvazov (AZE)	0–3 PO
Lázaro Rivas (CUB)	15–0	Jotham Pellew (NZL)	4–0 ST

=== Knockout round ===
Quarterfinals
Alfred Ter-Mkrtchyan (GER)	4
Sim Kwon-ho (KOR)	6
Wang Hui (CHN)	5
Kang Yong-gyun (PRK)	10

Semifinals
Sim Kwon-ho (KOR)	10
Kang Yong-gyun (PRK)	0
Andriy Kalashnikov (UKR)	0
Lázaro Rivas (CUB)	11

Gold medal match
Sim Kwon-ho (KOR)	8
Lázaro Rivas (CUB)	0
Bronze medal match
Kang Yong-gyun (PRK)	7
Andriy Kalashnikov (UKR)	0

Classification 5th–6th
Alfred Ter-Mkrtchyan (GER)	6
Wang Hui (CHN)	0

== Final standing ==
Rank	Athlete
1st place, gold medalist(s)	Sim Kwon-ho (KOR)
2nd place, silver medalist(s)	Lázaro Rivas (CUB)
3rd place, bronze medalist(s)	Kang Yong-gyun (PRK)
4	Andriy Kalashnikov (UKR)
5	Alfred Ter-Mkrtchyan (GER)
6	Wang Hui (CHN)
7	Natig Eyvazov (AZE)
8	Uran Kalilov (KGZ)
9	Rakymzhan Assembekov (KAZ)
10	Mohamed Abou El-Ela (EGY)
11	Ercan Yıldız (TUR)
12	Aleksey Shevtsov (RUS)
13	Marian Sandu (ROM)
14	Hassan Rangraz (IRI)
15	Aleksandr Tsertsvadze (GEO)
16	Petr Švehla (CZE)
17	Steven Mays (USA)
18	Tero Katajisto (FIN)
19	Dariusz Jabłoński (POL)
20	Jotham Pellew (NZL)
