= Wrestling at the 1992 Summer Olympics – Men's Greco-Roman 52 kg =

Men's Greco-Roman 52 kg at the Games of the XXV Olympiad
- Venue: Institut Nacional d'Educació Física de Catalunya
- Dates: 26–28 July 1992
- Competitors: 17 from 17 nations

Medalists
1st place, gold medalist(s)		Jon Rønningen	Norway
2nd place, silver medalist(s)		Alfred Ter-Mkrtchyan	Unified Team
3rd place, bronze medalist(s)		Min Kyung-gab	South Korea

The men's Greco-Roman 52 kilograms at the 1992 Summer Olympics as part of the wrestling program were held at the Institut Nacional d'Educació Física de Catalunya from July 26 to July 28. The wrestlers were divided into 2 groups. The winner of each group was decided by a double-elimination system. The bronze medal match was scratched and Min Kyung-gab was awarded the bronze medal because Shawn Sheldon weighed in over the weight limit.

== Results ==
Legend

- WO — Won by walkover

=== Elimination A ===
==== Round 1 ====
	Score		CP
Min Kyung-gab (KOR)	11–2 Ret	Majid Jahandideh (IRI)	4–0 PA
Ismo Kamesaki (FIN)	2–1	Serge Robert (FRA)	3–1 PP
Valentin Rebegea (ROM)	5–3	Raúl Martínez (CUB)	3–1 PP
Olaf Brandt (GER)	0–13	Alfred Ter-Mkrtchyan (EUN)	0–3.5 SO
Khaled Al-Faraj (SYR)		Bye	

==== Round 2 ====
	Score		CP
Khaled Al-Faraj (SYR)	5–8	Min Kyung-gab (KOR)	1–3 PP
Majid Jahandideh (IRI)	0–6	Ismo Kamesaki (FIN)	0–3 PO
Serge Robert (FRA)	1–2	Valentin Rebegea (ROM)	1–3 PP
Raúl Martínez (CUB)	15–0	Olaf Brandt (GER)	4–0 ST
Alfred Ter-Mkrtchyan (EUN)		Bye	

==== Round 3 ====
	Score		CP
Alfred Ter-Mkrtchyan (EUN)	4–1	Khaled Al-Faraj (SYR)	3–1 PP
Min Kyung-gab (KOR)	12–1	Valentin Rebegea (ROM)	3–1 PP
Ismo Kamesaki (FIN)	4–2	Raúl Martínez (CUB)	3–1 PP

==== Round 4 ====
	Score		CP
Alfred Ter-Mkrtchyan (EUN)	3–0	Min Kyung-gab (KOR)	3–0 PO
Ismo Kamesaki (FIN)	0–7	Valentin Rebegea (ROM)	0–3 PO

==== Round 5 ====
	Score		CP
Alfred Ter-Mkrtchyan (EUN)	5–0	Valentin Rebegea (ROM)	3–0 PO
Min Kyung-gab (KOR)	10–2	Ismo Kamesaki (FIN)	3–1 PP

==== Summary ====
Pos	Athlete	Pld	W	L	R	CP	TP
1	Alfred Ter-Mkrtchyan (EUN)	4	4	0	X (Note: EUN 3–0 KOR)	12.5	25
2	Min Kyung-gab (KOR)	5	4	1	X	13	41
3	Valentin Rebegea (ROM)	5	3	2	5	10	15
4	Ismo Kamesaki (FIN)	5	3	2	5	10	14
5	Raúl Martínez (CUB)	3	1	2	3	6	20
—	Khaled Al-Faraj (SYR)	2	0	2	3	2	6
—	Serge Robert (FRA)	2	0	2	2	2	2
—	Majid Jahandideh (IRI)	2	0	2	2	0	2
—	Olaf Brandt (GER)	2	0	2	2	0	0

Source: Official Report

=== Elimination B ===
==== Round 1 ====
	Score		CP
Ulises Valentin (DOM)	0–16	Bratan Tsenov (BUL)	0–4 ST
Senad Rizvanović (IOP)	10–0	Remzi Öztürk (TUR)	3–0 PO
Jon Rønningen (NOR)	17–0	Ramón Meña (PAN)	4–0 ST
Shawn Sheldon (USA)	7–0	Saïd Tango (MAR)	3–0 PO

==== Round 2 ====
	Score		CP
Ulises Valentin (DOM)	3–21	Senad Rizvanović (IOP)	0–4 ST
Bratan Tsenov (BUL)	2–0	Remzi Öztürk (TUR)	3–0 PO
Jon Rønningen (NOR)	5–0	Shawn Sheldon (USA)	3–0 PO
Ramón Meña (PAN)	5–2	Saïd Tango (MAR)	3–1 PP

==== Round 3 ====
	Score		CP
Bratan Tsenov (BUL)	3–5	Jon Rønningen (NOR)	1–3 PP
Senad Rizvanović (IOP)	1–3	Shawn Sheldon (USA)	1–3 PP

- Ramón Meña (PAN) was disqualified for failing to make weight before the third round.

==== Round 4 ====
	Score		CP
Bratan Tsenov (BUL)	2–5	Shawn Sheldon (USA)	1–3 PP
Senad Rizvanović (IOP)	0–11	Jon Rønningen (NOR)	0–3 PO

==== Summary ====
Pos	Athlete	Pld	W	L	R	CP	TP
1	Jon Rønningen (NOR)	4	4	0	X (Note: NOR 3–0 USA)	13	38
2	Shawn Sheldon (USA)	4	3	1	X	9	15
3	Bratan Tsenov (BUL)	4	2	2	4	9	23
4	Senad Rizvanović (IOP)	4	2	2	4	8	32
—	Ramón Meña (PAN)	2	1	1	2	3	5
5	Saïd Tango (MAR)	2	0	2	2	1	2
—	Ulises Valentin (DOM)	2	0	2	2	0	3
—	Remzi Öztürk (TUR)	2	0	2	2	0	0

Source: Official Report

=== Finals ===
	Score		CP
9th place match
Raúl Martínez (CUB)	15–0	Saïd Tango (MAR)	4–0 ST
7th place match
Ismo Kamesaki (FIN)	2–1	Senad Rizvanović (IOP)	3–1 PP
5th place match
Valentin Rebegea (ROM)	1–6	Bratan Tsenov (BUL)	1–3 PP
Bronze medal match
Min Kyung-gab (KOR)	WO	Shawn Sheldon (USA)	
Gold medal match
Alfred Ter-Mkrtchyan (EUN)	1–2	Jon Rønningen (NOR)	1–3 PP

== Final standing ==
Rank	Athlete
1st place, gold medalist(s)	Jon Rønningen (NOR)
2nd place, silver medalist(s)	Alfred Ter-Mkrtchyan (EUN)
3rd place, bronze medalist(s)	Min Kyung-gab (KOR)
4	Shawn Sheldon (USA)
5	Bratan Tsenov (BUL)
6	Valentin Rebegea (ROM)
7	Ismo Kamesaki (FIN)
8	Senad Rizvanović (IOP)
9	Raúl Martínez (CUB)
10	Saïd Tango (MAR)
