= Sim Kwon-ho =

South Korean Greco-Roman wrestler

Medal record

Men's Greco-Roman wrestling

Representing South Korea

Olympic Games
Gold medal – first place	2000 Sydney	54 kg
Gold medal – first place	1996 Atlanta	48 kg

World Championships
Gold medal – first place	1998 Gävle	54 kg
Gold medal – first place	1995 Prague	48 kg
Bronze medal – third place	1993 Stockholm	48 kg

Asian Games
Gold medal – first place	1998 Bangkok	54 kg
Gold medal – first place	1994 Hiroshima	48 kg

Asian Championships
Gold medal – first place	1999 Tashkent	54 kg
Gold medal – first place	1996 Xiaoshan	48 kg
Gold medal – first place	1995 Manila	48 kg
Silver medal – second place	1993 Hiroshima	48 kg

Sim Kwon-Ho (Korean: 심권호; Hanja: 沈權虎; born October 10, 1972, in Seongnam, South Korea) is a retired South Korean Greco Roman wrestler. He won gold medals at the 1996 and 2000 Olympic Games, and is the only South Korean wrestler to win two gold medals in the Olympics.

== Career ==
Sim was born on October 10, 1972, in Seongnam, Gyeonggi Province, and started wrestling at the age of 13. While attending Seoul Physical Education High School in 1990, Sim was first selected for the South Korean national wrestling team.

Sim first gained attention at the 1993 World Wrestling Championships where he won the bronze medal in the 48 kg category. Next year, Sim won the gold medal in the Men's Greco-Roman 48 kg at the Asian Games. Since the 1994 Asian Games, Sim swept gold medals in the Greco-Roman light flyweight(48 kg) and flyweight(54 kg) categories never losing a match at major international competitions such as Olympic Games, World Championships, Asian Games and Asian Championships until his retirement in 2000.

=== 1992 Olympic trials ===
While trying to earn his spot to compete for the 1992 Summer Olympics, in Barcelona, Sim was ranked first in the Men's Greco-Roman 48 kg at the South Korean national trials, beating 1991 World Champion Goun Duk-Yong. Amid controversy, however, Goun was selected by Korea Wrestling Federation over Sim in the 48 kg category at the Barcelona Games, despite being ranked lower in the trials. At the Barcelona Games Goun was eventually eliminated in Round 1.

=== 1996 Olympics ===
At the Atlanta Games in 1996, Sim won his first Olympic title by defeating Aleksandr Pavlov of Belarus in the final. He scored two points with a chest-high roll-through with 42 seconds left in regulation time and then added two more points with another roll in overtime to score a 4–0 victory.

In November 1996 Sim became the last world light flyweight (48 kg) champion at the 1996 World Cup where the FILA's final international 48 kg class competitions were held, dominating all the opponents by technical fall including two-time World Champion Wilber Sánchez of Cuba.

=== 2000 Olympics ===
Sim moved up in weight from 48 kg to 54 kg in 1997 when the new weight classes were established by FILA. In the semifinals of the Sydney Games in 2000, he defeated Kang Yong-Gyun of North Korea 10–0. At the Opening Ceremony, the North and South Koreans had marched together. In this spirit, before the medal matches, Sim gave advice to Kang about the man he would be facing in the bronze-medal match-Andriy Kalashnikov of Ukraine, while Kang gave Sim a scouting report on his opponent in the gold-medal match-Lázaro Rivas of Cuba. Both Koreans won, with Sim scoring early and often against Rivas and prevailing 8–0.

== Post career ==
Sim is currently a wrestling commentator for SBS Sports and serving as an assistant coach for the KOMSCO wrestling team.

== Notable final matches ==
Opponent	Res.	Class	Score	Date	Competition	Notes
Win	(Cuba) Lázaro Rivas	54kg	8:0	2000-06-09	(Australia) 2000 Summer Olympics	Won second Olympic gold medal.
Win	(Uzbekistan) Shamseddin Khudoyberdiev	54kg	3:2	1999-05-31	(Uzbekistan) 1999 Asian Championships	Won third Asian Championship gold medal.
Win	(North Korea) Kang Yong-Gyun	54kg	5:5	1998-12-13	(Thailand) 1998 Asian Games	Won second Asian Games gold medal.
Win	(Romania) Marian Sandu	54kg	5:3	1998-08-30	(Sweden) 1998 World Championships	Won second World Championship gold medal.
Win	(Belarus) Aleksandr Pavlov	48kg	4:0	1996-07-21	(United States) 1996 Summer Olympics	Won first Olympic gold medal.
Win	(North Korea) Kang Yong-Gyun	48kg	11:0	1996-04-06	(China) 1996 Asian Championships	Won second Asian Championship gold medal.
Win	(Japan) Hiroshi Kado	48kg	6:0	1995-10-14	(Czech Republic) 1995 World Championships	Won first World Championship gold medal.
Win	(Uzbekistan) Dmitri Korshunov	48kg	12:0	1995-06-28	(Philippines) 1995 Asian Championships	Won first Asian Championship gold medal.
Win	(Iran) Reza Simkhah	48kg	7:0	1994-10-05	(Japan) 1994 Asian Games	Won first Asian Games gold medal.
