= Wrestling at the 1996 Summer Olympics – Men's Greco-Roman 48 kg =

Men's Greco-Roman 48 kg at the Games of the XXVI Olympiad
- Venue: Georgia World Congress Center
- Dates: 20–21 July 1996
- Competitors: 19 from 19 nations

Medalists
1st place, gold medalist(s)		Sim Kwon-ho	South Korea
2nd place, silver medalist(s)		Aleksandr Pavlov	Belarus
3rd place, bronze medalist(s)		Zafar Guliev	Russia

The men's Greco-Roman 48 kilograms at the 1996 Summer Olympics as part of the wrestling program were held at the Georgia World Congress Center from July 20 to July 21. The gold and silver medalists were determined by the final match of the main single-elimination bracket. The losers advanced to the repechage. These matches determined the bronze medalist for the event.

== Results ==
=== Round 1 ===
	Score		CP
1/16 finals
Zafar Guliev (RUS)	3–2	Hiroshi Kado (JPN)	3–1 PP
Bayram Özdemir (TUR)	11–0	Enrique Aguilar (MEX)	4–0 ST
Jorge Yllescas (PER)	0–10	Ioannis Agatzanian (GRE)	0–4 ST
Francesco Costantino (ITA)	6–8	Gela Papashvili (GEO)	1–3 PP
Bratan Tsenov (BUL)	10–0	Abdullah Al-Izani (YEM)	4–0 ST
Oleg Kutscherenko (GER)	10–0	Tahir Zahidov (AZE)	4–0 ST
Wilber Sánchez (CUB)	12–3	Mujaahid Maynard (USA)	3–1 PP
Aleksandr Pavlov (BLR)	11–0	José Ochoa (VEN)	4–0 ST
Kang Yong-gyun (PRK)	9–3	Piotr Jabłoński (POL)	3–1 PP
Sim Kwon-ho (KOR)		Bye	

=== Round 2 ===
	Score		CP
1/8 finals
Sim Kwon-ho (KOR)	2–1	Zafar Guliev (RUS)	3–1 PP
Bayram Özdemir (TUR)	2–3	Ioannis Agatzanian (GRE)	0–4 EF
Gela Papashvili (GEO)	7–4	Bratan Tsenov (BUL)	3–1 PP
Oleg Kutscherenko (GER)	1–1	Wilber Sánchez (CUB)	1–3 PP
Aleksandr Pavlov (BLR)	3–2	Kang Yong-gyun (PRK)	3–1 PP
Repechage
Hiroshi Kado (JPN)	10–0	Enrique Aguilar (MEX)	4–0 ST
Jorge Yllescas (PER)	0–10	Francesco Costantino (ITA)	0–4 ST
Abdullah Al-Izani (YEM)	0–11	Tahir Zahidov (AZE)	0–4 ST
Mujaahid Maynard (USA)	4–2 Fall	José Ochoa (VEN)	4–0 TO
Piotr Jabłoński (POL)		Bye	

=== Round 3 ===
	Score		CP
Quarterfinals
Sim Kwon-ho (KOR)	4–1	Ioannis Agatzanian (GRE)	3–1 PP
Gela Papashvili (GEO)		Bye	
Wilber Sánchez (CUB)		Bye	
Aleksandr Pavlov (BLR)		Bye	
Repechage
Piotr Jabłoński (POL)	1–9	Hiroshi Kado (JPN)	1–3 PP
Francesco Costantino (ITA)	5–0	Tahir Zahidov (AZE)	3–0 PO
Mujaahid Maynard (USA)	0–6	Zafar Guliev (RUS)	0–3 PO
Bayram Özdemir (TUR)	4–0	Bratan Tsenov (BUL)	3–0 PO
Oleg Kutscherenko (GER)	0–3	Kang Yong-gyun (PRK)	0–3 PO

=== Round 4 ===
	Score		CP
Semifinals
Sim Kwon-ho (KOR)	11–0	Gela Papashvili (GEO)	4–0 ST
Wilber Sánchez (CUB)	0–5	Aleksandr Pavlov (BLR)	0–3 PO
Repechage
Hiroshi Kado (JPN)	4–0	Francesco Costantino (ITA)	3–0 PO
Zafar Guliev (RUS)	7–0	Bayram Özdemir (TUR)	3–0 PO
Kang Yong-gyun (PRK)	10–0	Ioannis Agatzanian (GRE)	4–0 ST

=== Round 5 ===
	Score		CP
Repechage
Hiroshi Kado (JPN)	0–11	Kang Yong-gyun (PRK)	0–4 ST
Zafar Guliev (RUS)		Bye	

=== Round 6 ===
	Score		CP
Repechage
Gela Papashvili (GEO)	0–6	Zafar Guliev (RUS)	0–3 PO
Kang Yong-gyun (PRK)	7–0	Wilber Sánchez (CUB)	3–0 PO

=== Finals ===
	Score		CP
Classification 7th–8th
Hiroshi Kado (JPN)	1–0 Ret	Ioannis Agatzanian (GRE)	4–0 PA
Classification 5th–6th
Gela Papashvili (GEO)	0–4	Wilber Sánchez (CUB)	0–3 PO
Bronze medal match
Zafar Guliev (RUS)	4–0	Kang Yong-gyun (PRK)	3–0 PO
Gold medal match
Sim Kwon-ho (KOR)	4–0	Aleksandr Pavlov (BLR)	3–0 PO

== Final standing ==
Rank	Athlete
1st place, gold medalist(s)	Sim Kwon-ho (KOR)
2nd place, silver medalist(s)	Aleksandr Pavlov (BLR)
3rd place, bronze medalist(s)	Zafar Guliev (RUS)
4	Kang Yong-gyun (PRK)
5	Wilber Sánchez (CUB)
6	Gela Papashvili (GEO)
7	Hiroshi Kado (JPN)
8	Ioannis Agatzanian (GRE)
9	Francesco Costantino (ITA)
10	Bayram Özdemir (TUR)
11	Bratan Tsenov (BUL)
12	Oleg Kutscherenko (GER)
13	Mujaahid Maynard (USA)
14	Tahir Zahidov (AZE)
15	Piotr Jabłoński (POL)
16	José Ochoa (VEN)
17	Enrique Aguilar (MEX)
18	Jorge Yllescas (PER)
19	Abdullah Al-Izani (YEM)
