= Sport in Moldova =

Sport in Moldova has reached international levels as individuals compete at the European, World and Olympic levels. Most notably, Moldova has won a range of medals at the European championships in boxing, Judo, weightlifting and wrestling, and also is known for being skilled in soccer as well.

== Sports ==
=== Basketball ===
Moldova has an increasingly successful team at the FIBA European Championship for Small Countries. There, Moldova has won two silver medals (in 2008 and 2012) for men and two bronze medals (in 2006 and 2016) for women.

The country has a professional basketball league, the Moldovan National Division.

=== Cycling ===
The most prestigious cycling race is the Moldova President's Cup, which was first run in 2004.

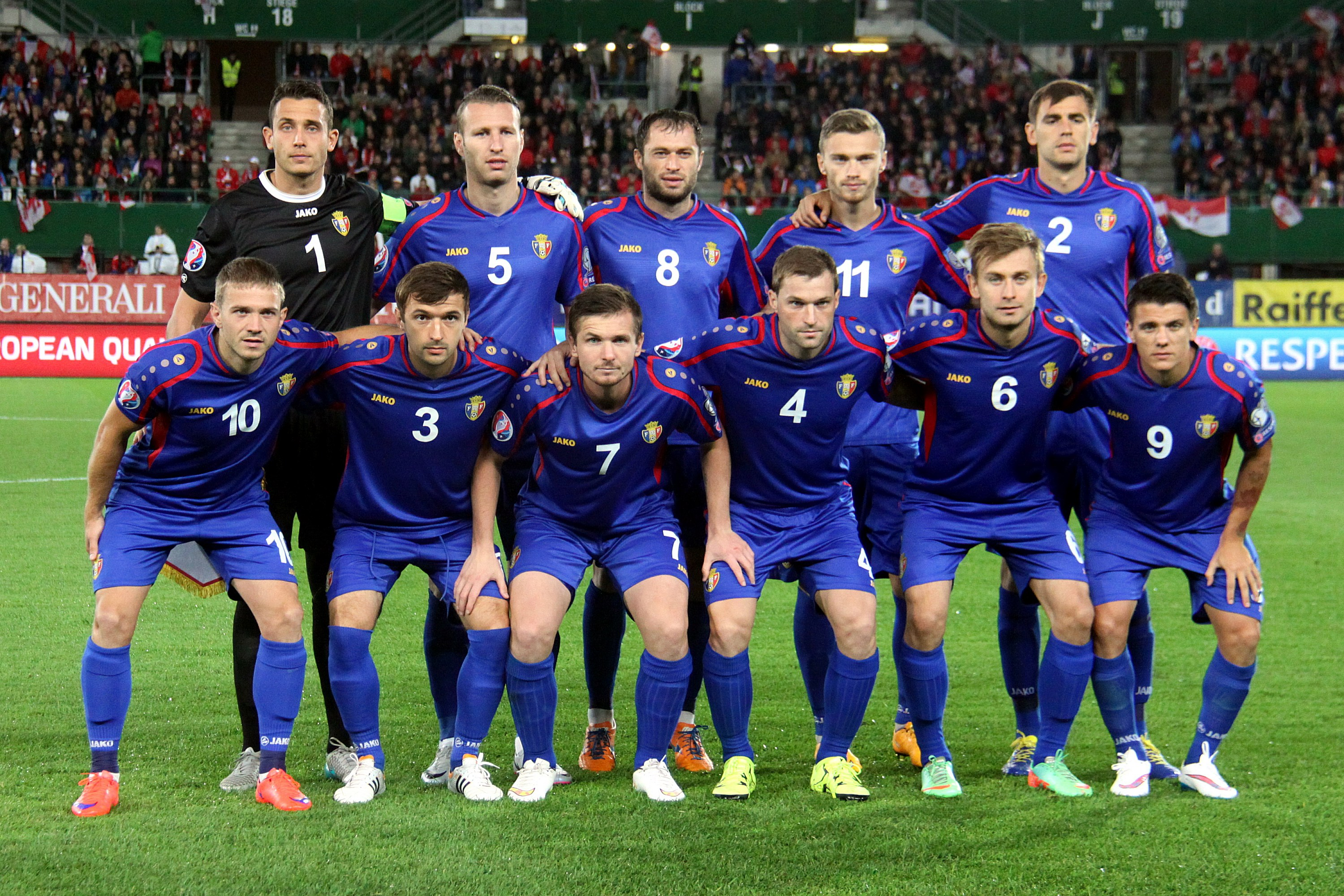
Moldova national football team in 2015

=== Football ===
Football is the most popular sport in Moldova.

=== Rugby ===
Rugby union is becoming more popular. Since 2004, the number of players at all levels has doubled to 3,200. Despite the hardships and deprivations the national team are ranked 34th in the world. More than 10,000 supporters turn out for home internationals.

=== Wrestling ===
Trânta (a form of wrestling) is the national sport in Moldova.

== Major achievements by sporting event ==
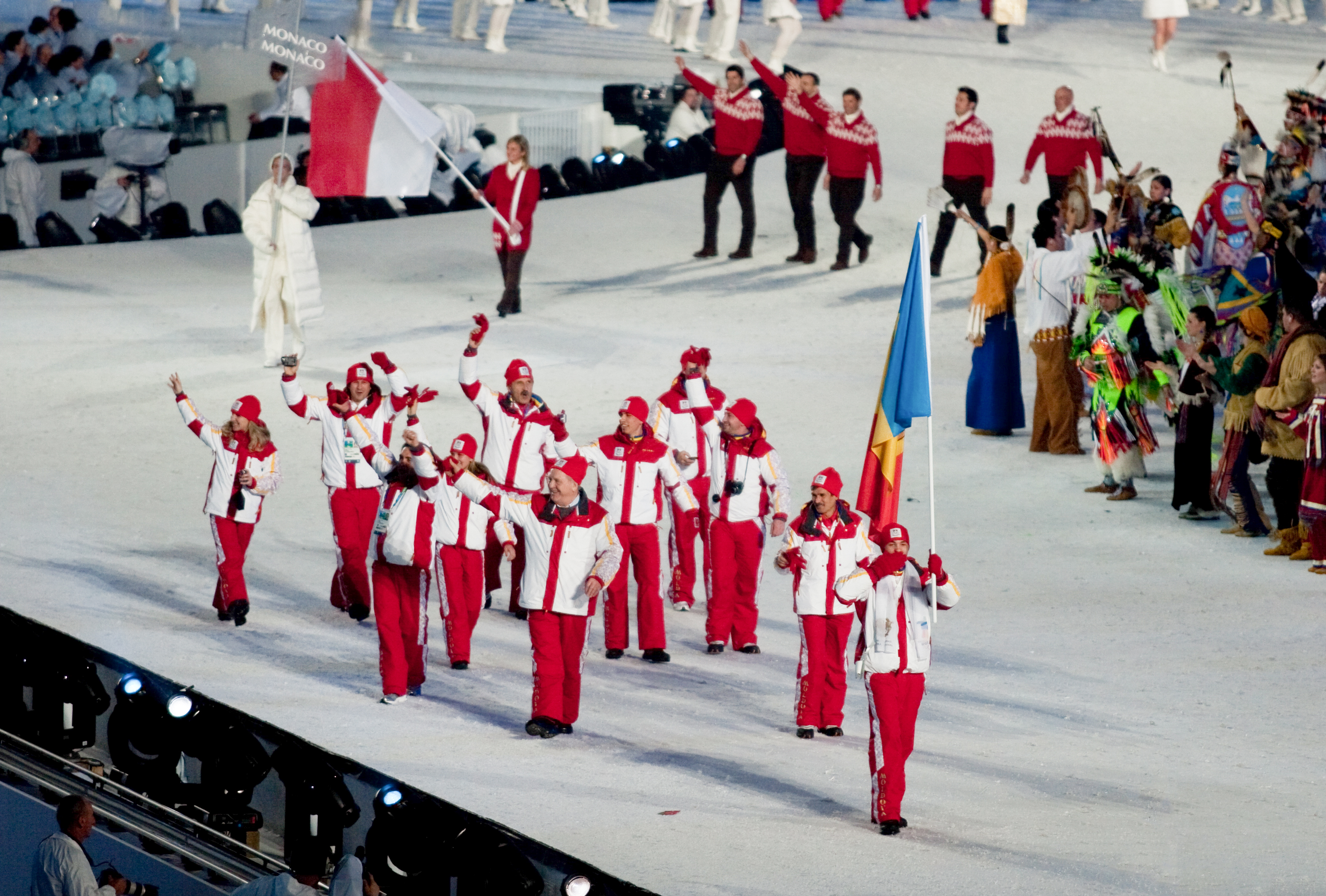
Moldova at the 2010 Winter Olympics

=== Olympic Games ===
| Sport | Event | Athlete(s) | Result |
|---|---|---|---|
| Boxing | 2000 Summer Olympics | Vitalie Gruşac | 3rd place, bronze medalist(s) |
| Boxing | 2008 Summer Olympics | Veaceslav Gojan | 3rd place, bronze medalist(s) |
| Canoeing | 1996 Summer Olympics | Nicolae Juravschi; Viktor Reneysky | 2nd place, silver medalist(s) |
| Shooting | 2000 Summer Olympics | Oleg Moldovan | 2nd place, silver medalist(s) |
| Wrestling | 1996 Summer Olympics | Sergei Mureiko | 3rd place, bronze medalist(s) |

=== Paralympic Games ===
| Sport | Event | Athlete(s) | Result |
|---|---|---|---|
| Athletics | 1996 Summer Paralympics | Nikolai Tchoumak | 3rd place, bronze medalist(s) |
| Table tennis | 1996 Summer Paralympics | Vladimir Polkanov | 3rd place, bronze medalist(s) |

=== Youth Olympic Games ===
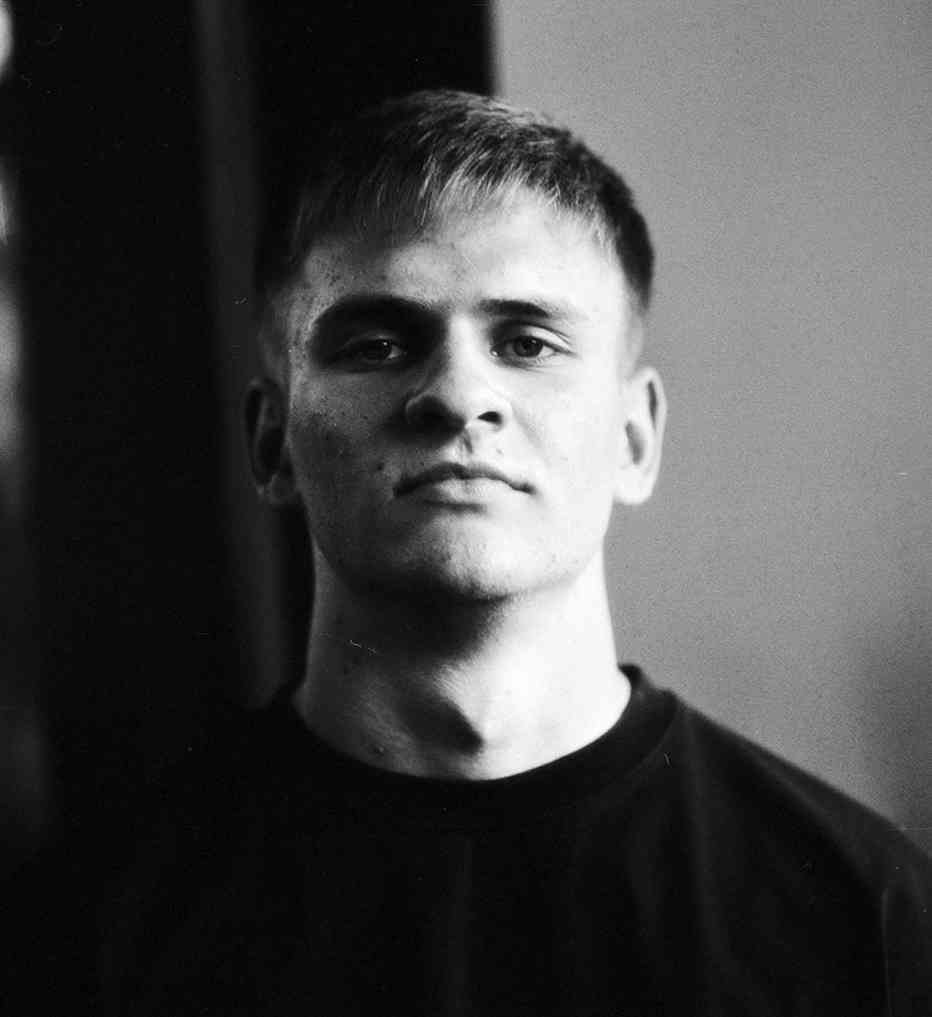
Traian Anitoi

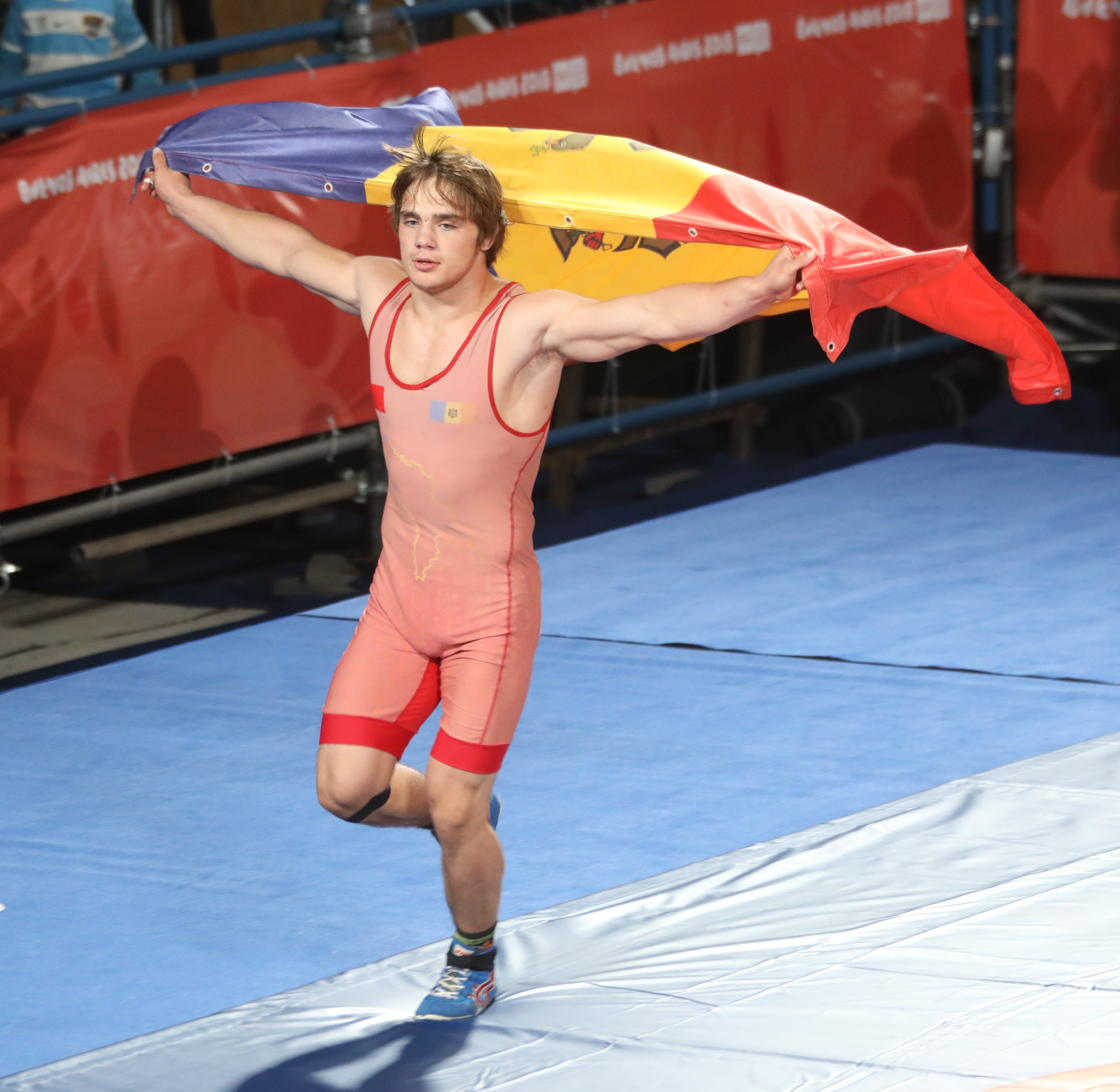
Alexandrin Guţu

| Sport | Event | Athlete(s) | Result |
|---|---|---|---|
| Boxing | 2010 Summer Youth Olympics | Daniil Svaresciuc | 3rd place, bronze medalist(s) |
| Canoeing | 2014 Summer Youth Olympics | Serghei Tarnovschi | 1st place, gold medalist(s) |
| Wrestling | 2010 Summer Youth Olympics | Iulia Leorda | 2nd place, silver medalist(s) |
| Wrestling | 2014 Summer Youth Olympics | Dmitri Ceacusta | 2nd place, silver medalist(s) |
| Wrestling | 2014 Summer Youth Olympics | Tatiano Doncila | 3rd place, bronze medalist(s) |

=== World Championships ===
| Sport | Event | Athlete(s) | Result |
|---|---|---|---|
| Archery | 1993 World Indoor Archery Championships | Natalia Valeeva | 2nd place, silver medalist(s) |
| Archery | 1995 World Archery Championships | Natalia Valeeva | 1st place, gold medalist(s) |
| Archery | 1995 World Indoor Archery Championships | Natalia Valeeva | 1st place, gold medalist(s) |
| Boxing | 2001 Women's World Amateur Boxing Championships | Irina Smirnova | 3rd place, bronze medalist(s) |
| Canoeing | 1995 ICF Canoe Sprint World Championships | Nicolae Juravschi; Viktor Reneysky | 2nd place, silver medalist(s) |
| Canoeing | 2015 ICF Canoe Sprint World Championships | Oleg Tarnovschi | 2nd place, silver medalist(s) |
| Canoeing | 2015 ICF Canoe Sprint World Championships | Serghei Tarnovschi | 3rd place, bronze medalist(s) |
| Judo | 1997 World Judo Championships | Victor Florescu | 2nd place, silver medalist(s) |
| Judo | 1997 World Judo Championships | Victor Bivol | 3rd place, bronze medalist(s) |
| Judo | 2011 World Judo Championships | Sergiu Toma | 3rd place, bronze medalist(s) |
| Swimming | 1993 FINA World Swimming Championships (25 m) | Serghei Mariniuc | 2nd place, silver medalist(s) |
| Taekwondo | 2015 World Taekwondo Championships | Aaron Cook | 3rd place, bronze medalist(s) |
| Weightlifting | 1995 World Weightlifting Championships | Vadim Vacarciuc | 3rd place, bronze medalist(s) |
| Weightlifting | 2003 World Weightlifting Championships | Vadim Vacarciuc | 3rd place, bronze medalist(s) |
| Weightlifting | 2005 World Weightlifting Championships | Alexandru Bratan | 2nd place, silver medalist(s) |
| Wrestling | 1993 World Wrestling Championships | Sergei Mureiko | 2nd place, silver medalist(s) |
| Wrestling | 1994 World Wrestling Championships | Lukman Jabrailov | 1st place, gold medalist(s) |
| Wrestling | 1994 World Wrestling Championships | Victor Peicov | 2nd place, silver medalist(s) |
| Wrestling | 1995 World Wrestling Championships | Sergei Mureiko | 2nd place, silver medalist(s) |
| Wrestling | 2003 World Wrestling Championships | Ghenadie Tulbea | 2nd place, silver medalist(s) |
| Wrestling | 2014 World Wrestling Championships | Mihai Sava | 3rd place, bronze medalist(s) |

=== World Games ===
| Sport | Event | Athlete(s) | Result |
|---|---|---|---|
| Dancesport | 2013 World Games | Gabriele Pasquale Goffredo; Anna Matus | 1st place, gold medalist(s) |

=== European Championships ===
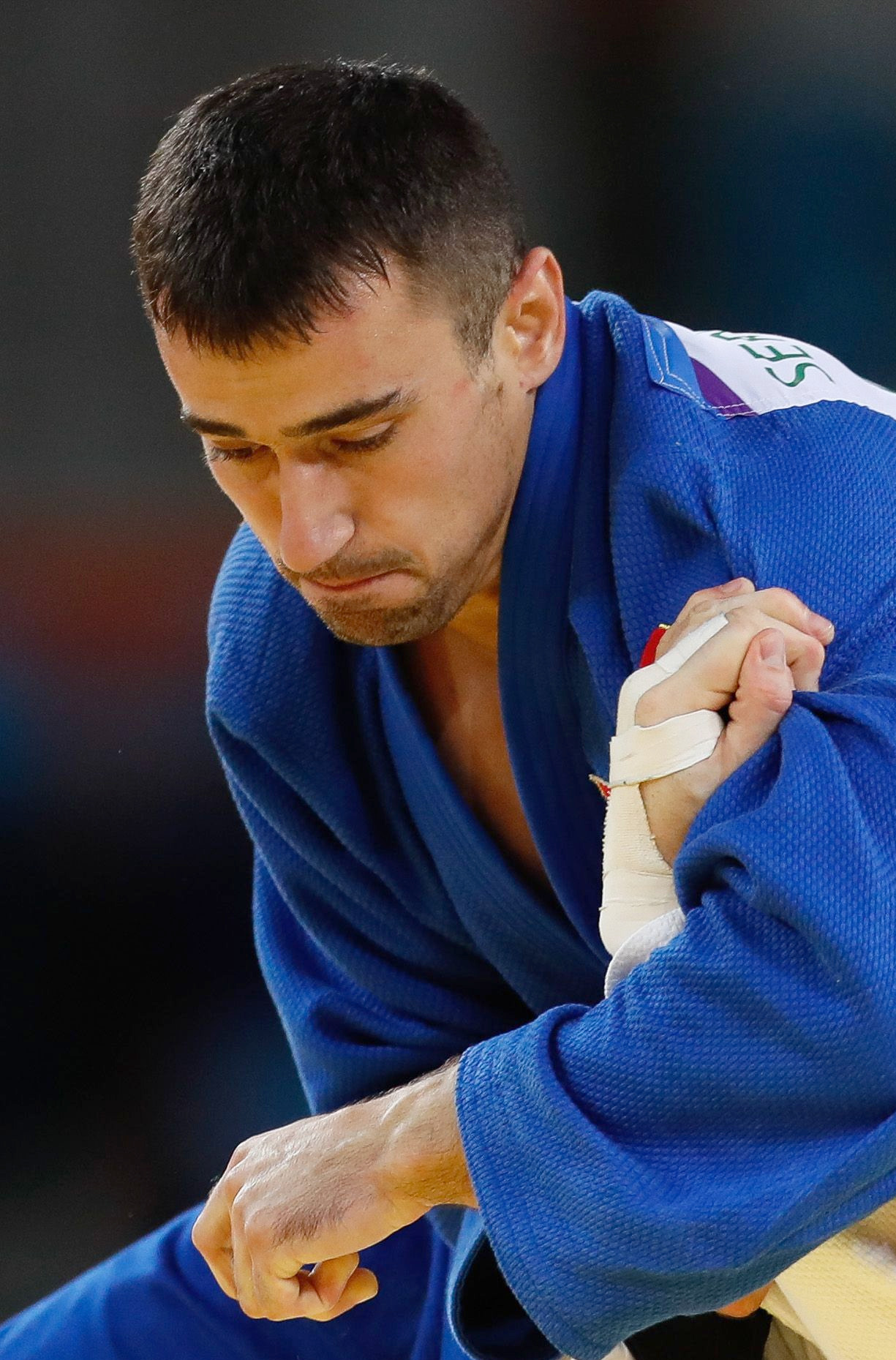
Sergiu Toma

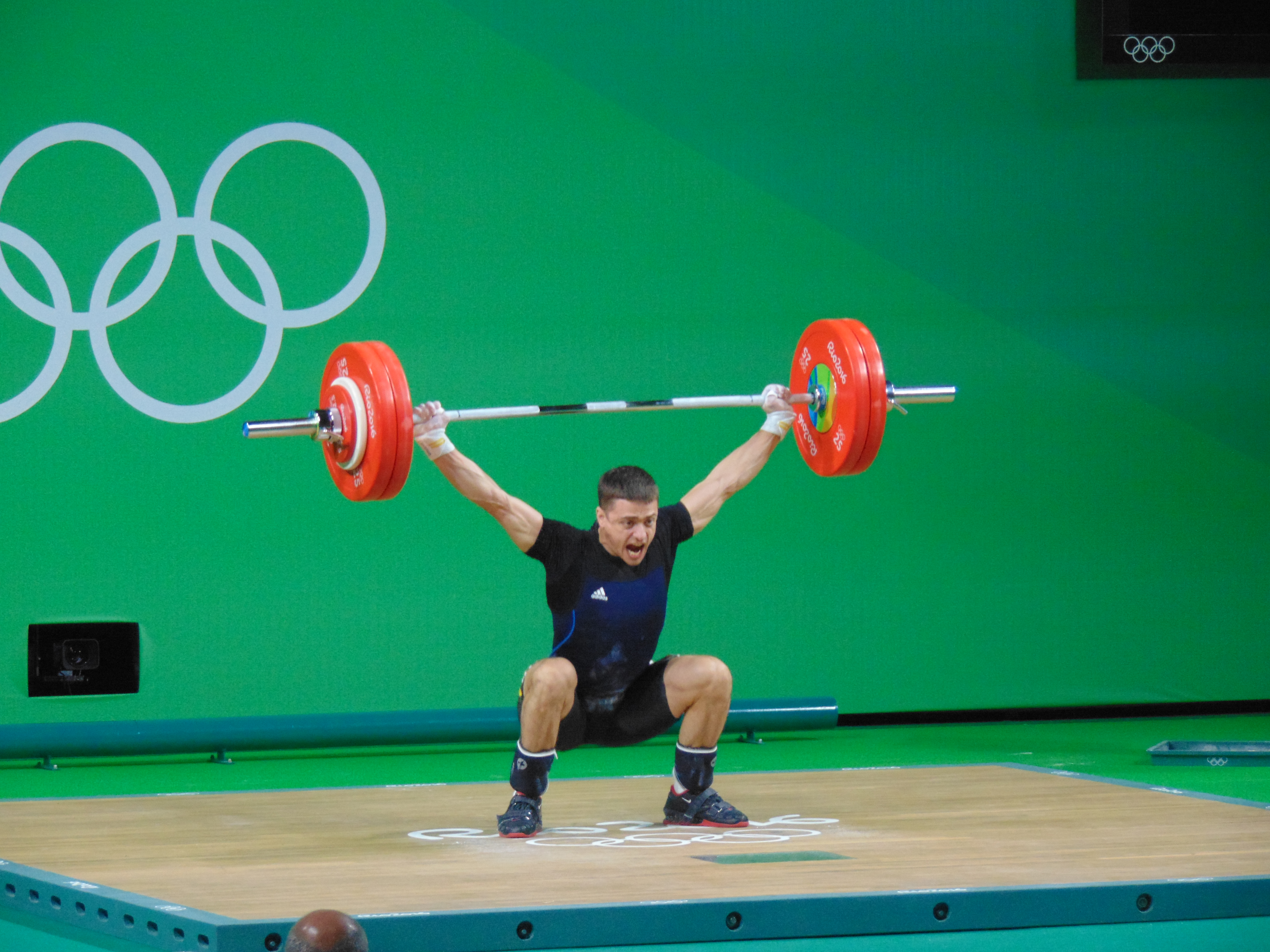
Serghei Cechir

| Sport | Event | Athlete(s) | Result |
|---|---|---|---|
| Athletics | 1996 European Athletics Indoor Championships | Olga Bolşova | 3rd place, bronze medalist(s) |
| Athletics | 2010 European Athletics Championships | Ion Luchianov | 3rd place, bronze medalist(s) |
| Biathlon | Biathlon European Championships 2008 | Natalia Levchenkova | 1st place, gold medalist(s) |
| Boxing | 2001 Women's European Amateur Boxing Championships | Elena Hadji | 2nd place, silver medalist(s) |
| Boxing | 2002 European Amateur Boxing Championships | Veaceslav Gojan | 2nd place, silver medalist(s) |
| Boxing | 2002 European Amateur Boxing Championships | Igor Samoilenco | 3rd place, bronze medalist(s) |
| Boxing | 2008 European Amateur Boxing Championships | Alexandr Riscan | 3rd place, bronze medalist(s) |
| Boxing | 2008 European Amateur Boxing Championships | Victor Cotiujanschi | 3rd place, bronze medalist(s) |
| Boxing | 2011 European Amateur Boxing Championships | Veaceslav Gojan | 1st place, gold medalist(s) |
| Boxing | 2011 European Amateur Boxing Championships | Alexandr Riscan | 3rd place, bronze medalist(s) |
| Boxing | 2013 European Amateur Boxing Championships | Dmitri Galagot | 2nd place, silver medalist(s) |
| Boxing | 2013 European Amateur Boxing Championships | Petru Ciobanu | 3rd place, bronze medalist(s) |
| Canoeing | 2016 Canoe Sprint European Championships | Oleg Tarnovschi | 3rd place, bronze medalist(s) |
| Canoeing | 2016 Canoe Sprint European Championships | Serghei Tarnovschi | 2nd place, silver medalist(s) |
| Football | 2011 EMF miniEURO | National team | 3rd place, bronze medalist(s) |
| Gymnastics | 2000 European Trampoline Championships | Vladimir Cojoc | 3rd place, bronze medalist(s) |
| Judo | 1993 European Judo Championships | Apti Magomadov | 2nd place, silver medalist(s) |
| Judo | 1993 European Judo Championships | Tudor Lazarenko | 3rd place, bronze medalist(s) |
| Judo | 1996 European Judo Championships | Oleg Crețul | 2nd place, silver medalist(s) |
| Judo | 1998 European Judo Championships | Andrei Golban | 2nd place, silver medalist(s) |
| Judo | 1999 European Judo Championships | Victor Bivol | 3rd place, bronze medalist(s) |
| Judo | 2001 European Judo Championships | Nicolai Belokosov | 3rd place, bronze medalist(s) |
| Judo | 2009 European Judo Championships | Marcel Trudov | 3rd place, bronze medalist(s) |
| Judo | 2011 European Judo Championships | Sergiu Toma | 2nd place, silver medalist(s) |
| Taekwondo | 2010 European Taekwondo Championships | Vladislav Arventii | 3rd place, bronze medalist(s) |
| Taekwondo | 2014 European Taekwondo Championships | Stepan Dimitrov | 1st place, gold medalist(s) |
| Taekwondo | 2014 European Taekwondo Championships | Vladislav Arventii | 3rd place, bronze medalist(s) |
| Taekwondo | 2016 European Taekwondo Championships | Aaron Cook | 3rd place, bronze medalist(s) |
| Weightlifting | 1994 European Weightlifting Championships | Vadim Vacarciuc | 3rd place, bronze medalist(s) |
| Weightlifting | 2000 European Weightlifting Championships | Vadim Vacarciuc | 2nd place, silver medalist(s) |
| Weightlifting | 2001 European Weightlifting Championships | Vladimir Popov | 3rd place, bronze medalist(s) |
| Weightlifting | 2002 European Weightlifting Championships | Igor Grabucea | 3rd place, bronze medalist(s) |
| Weightlifting | 2004 European Weightlifting Championships | Alexandru Bratan | 3rd place, bronze medalist(s) |
| Weightlifting | 2006 European Weightlifting Championships | Igor Grabucea | 2nd place, silver medalist(s) |
| Weightlifting | 2006 European Weightlifting Championships | Alexandru Bratan | 3rd place, bronze medalist(s) |
| Weightlifting | 2007 European Weightlifting Championships | Igor Bour | 1st place, gold medalist(s) |
| Weightlifting | 2007 European Weightlifting Championships | Eugen Bratan | 3rd place, bronze medalist(s) |
| Weightlifting | 2007 European Weightlifting Championships | Igor Grabucea | 3rd place, bronze medalist(s) |
| Weightlifting | 2009 European Weightlifting Championships | Cristina Iovu | 2nd place, silver medalist(s) |
| Weightlifting | 2009 European Weightlifting Championships | Igor Grabucea | 3rd place, bronze medalist(s) |
| Weightlifting | 2011 European Weightlifting Championships | Oleg Sîrghi | 1st place, gold medalist(s) |
| Weightlifting | 2011 European Weightlifting Championships | Anatolie Cîrîcu | 2nd place, silver medalist(s) |
| Weightlifting | 2012 European Weightlifting Championships | Anatolie Cîrîcu | 1st place, gold medalist(s) |
| Weightlifting | 2012 European Weightlifting Championships | Cristina Iovu | 1st place, gold medalist(s) |
| Weightlifting | 2012 European Weightlifting Championships | Oleg Sîrghi | 2nd place, silver medalist(s) |
| Weightlifting | 2012 European Weightlifting Championships | Serghei Cechir | 2nd place, silver medalist(s) |
| Weightlifting | 2012 European Weightlifting Championships | Alexandru Spac | 3rd place, bronze medalist(s) |
| Weightlifting | 2013 European Weightlifting Championships | Oleg Sîrghi | 1st place, gold medalist(s) |
| Weightlifting | 2013 European Weightlifting Championships | Alexandru Spac | 2nd place, silver medalist(s) |
| Weightlifting | 2013 European Weightlifting Championships | Igor Bour | 2nd place, silver medalist(s) |
| Weightlifting | 2014 European Weightlifting Championships | Serghei Cechir | 3rd place, bronze medalist(s) |
| Weightlifting | 2015 European Weightlifting Championships | Oleg Sîrghi | 1st place, gold medalist(s) |
| Weightlifting | 2015 European Weightlifting Championships | Alexandru Dudoglo | 2nd place, silver medalist(s) |
| Weightlifting | 2015 European Weightlifting Championships | Andrian Zbirnea | 2nd place, silver medalist(s) |
| Weightlifting | 2016 European Weightlifting Championships | Iurie Dudoglo | 3rd place, bronze medalist(s) |
| Wrestling | 1993 European Wrestling Championships | Oleg Tokarev | 2nd place, silver medalist(s) |
| Wrestling | 1993 European Wrestling Championships | Victor Peicov | 3rd place, bronze medalist(s) |
| Wrestling | 1993 European Wrestling Championships | Sergei Mureiko | 3rd place, bronze medalist(s) |
| Wrestling | 1994 European Wrestling Championships | Lukman Jabrailov | 2nd place, silver medalist(s) |
| Wrestling | 1995 European Wrestling Championships | Sergei Mureiko | 3rd place, bronze medalist(s) |
| Wrestling | 1996 European Wrestling Championships | Igor Grabovetchi | 2nd place, silver medalist(s) |
| Wrestling | 1996 European Wrestling Championships | Sergei Mureiko | 3rd place, bronze medalist(s) |
| Wrestling | 2001 European Wrestling Championships | Ghenadie Tulbea | 1st place, gold medalist(s) |
| Wrestling | 2002 European Wrestling Championships | Ghenadie Tulbea | 2nd place, silver medalist(s) |
| Wrestling | 2005 European Wrestling Championships | Ghenadie Tulbea | 1st place, gold medalist(s) |
| Wrestling | 2006 European Wrestling Championships | Ludmila Cristea | 2nd place, silver medalist(s) |
| Wrestling | 2010 European Wrestling Championships | Andrei Perpeliță | 3rd place, bronze medalist(s) |
| Wrestling | 2011 European Wrestling Championships | Ludmila Cristea | 2nd place, silver medalist(s) |
| Wrestling | 2011 European Wrestling Championships | Natalia Budu | 3rd place, bronze medalist(s) |
| Wrestling | 2011 European Wrestling Championships | Nicolae Ceban | 3rd place, bronze medalist(s) |
| Wrestling | 2012 European Wrestling Championships | Ludmila Cristea | 3rd place, bronze medalist(s) |
| Wrestling | 2014 European Wrestling Championships | Victor Ciobanu | 2nd place, silver medalist(s) |
| Wrestling | 2014 European Wrestling Championships | Andrei Perpeliță | 3rd place, bronze medalist(s) |
| Wrestling | 2014 European Wrestling Championships | Nicolae Ceban | 3rd place, bronze medalist(s) |
| Wrestling | 2014 European Wrestling Championships | Natalia Budu | 3rd place, bronze medalist(s) |
| Wrestling | 2016 European Wrestling Championships | Donior Islamov | 3rd place, bronze medalist(s) |
| Wrestling | 2017 European Wrestling Championships | Andrei Perpeliță | 3rd place, bronze medalist(s) |

=== European Games ===
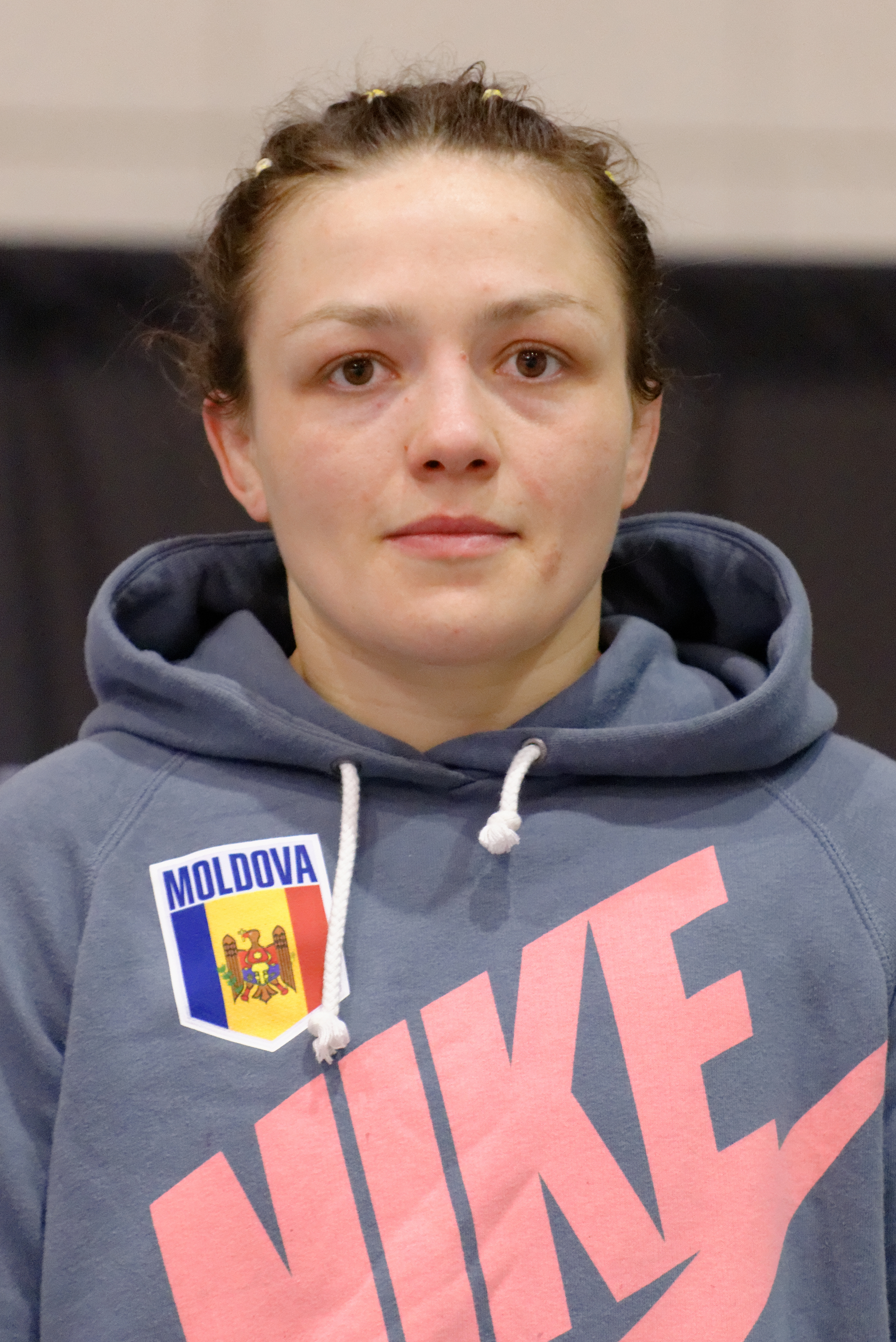
Svetlana Saenko

| Sport | Event | Athlete(s) | Result |
|---|---|---|---|
| Wrestling | 2015 European Games | Piotr Ianulov | 2nd place, silver medalist(s) |
| Wrestling | 2015 European Games | Svetlana Saenko | 3rd place, bronze medalist(s) |
| Wrestling | 2015 European Games | Alexandru Chirtoaca | 3rd place, bronze medalist(s) |

== See also ==
- Football in Moldova
- Moldova at the Olympics
- Rugby union in Moldova
