= 1996 European Wrestling Championships =

- Host city: Budapest, Hungary Greco-Roman; Oslo, Norway Freestyle
- Dates: 21 – 30 March 1996; 1 – 3 June 1996

Champions
- Freestyle: Russia
- Greco-Roman: Russia
- Women: France

The 1996 European Wrestling Championships were held in the Greco-Romane and the men's Freestyle style in Budapest 21 – 30 March 1996; the women's Freestyle style in Oslo 1 – 3 June 1996 .

== Medal table ==
| Rank | Nation | Gold | Silver | Bronze | Total |
|---|---|---|---|---|---|
| 1 | Russia | 9 | 4 | 5 | 18 |
| 2 | Turkey | 4 | 1 | 0 | 5 |
| 3 | Ukraine | 3 | 3 | 5 | 11 |
| 4 | France | 3 | 0 | 2 | 5 |
| 5 | Poland | 2 | 1 | 3 | 6 |
| 6 | Germany | 1 | 4 | 4 | 9 |
| 7 | Hungary | 1 | 2 | 0 | 3 |
| 8 | Belarus | 1 | 1 | 1 | 3 |
| 9 | Austria | 1 | 1 | 0 | 2 |
| 9 | Bulgaria | 1 | 1 | 0 | 2 |
| 11 | Azerbaijan | 1 | 0 | 2 | 3 |
| 12 | Georgia | 1 | 0 | 0 | 1 |
| 12 | Sweden | 1 | 0 | 0 | 1 |
| 14 | Armenia | 0 | 3 | 1 | 4 |
| 15 | Italy | 0 | 2 | 1 | 3 |
| 16 | Slovakia | 0 | 2 | 0 | 2 |
| 17 | Moldova | 0 | 1 | 1 | 2 |
| 17 | Norway | 0 | 1 | 1 | 2 |
| 19 | Greece | 0 | 1 | 0 | 1 |
| 19 | Romania | 0 | 1 | 0 | 1 |
| 21 | Israel | 0 | 0 | 1 | 1 |
| 21 | North Macedonia | 0 | 0 | 1 | 1 |
| Totals (22 entries) | | 29 | 29 | 28 | 86 |

== Medal summary ==
=== Men's freestyle ===
| Event | Gold | Silver | Bronze |
|---|---|---|---|
| 48 kg | Viktor Yefteni; Ukraine | Armen Mkrtchyan; Armenia | Vugar Orujov; Russia |
| 52 kg | Vladimir Toguzov; Ukraine | Ivan Tsonov; Bulgaria | Namig Abdullayev; Azerbaijan |
| 57 kg | Serafim Barzakov; Bulgaria | Harun Doğan; Turkey | Arif Abdullayev; Azerbaijan |
| 62 kg | Magomed Azizov; Russia | Giovanni Schillaci; Italy | Sergey Smal; Belarus |
| 68 kg | Vadim Bogiev; Russia | Arayik Gevorgyan; Armenia | Zaza Zazirov; Ukraine |
| 74 kg | Buvaisar Saitiev; Russia | Radion Kertanti; Slovakia | Valerij Verhušin; North Macedonia |
| 82 kg | Magomed Ibragimov; Azerbaijan | László Dvorák; Hungary | Khadzhimurad Magomedov; Russia |
| 90 kg | Eldar Kurtanidze; Georgia | Heiko Balz; Germany | Sagid Murtazaliev; Ukraine |
| 100 kg | Marek Garmulewicz; Poland | Milan Mazáč; Slovakia | David Musulbes; Russia |
| 130 kg | Mahmut Demir; Turkey | Sven Thiele; Germany | Merab Valiyev; Ukraine |

=== Men's Greco-Roman ===
| Event | Gold | Silver | Bronze |
|---|---|---|---|
| 48 kg | Zafar Guliev; Russia | Ioannis Agatzanian; Greece | Francesco Costantino; Italy |
| 52 kg | Andriy Kalashnykov; Ukraine | Armen Nazaryan; Armenia | Alfred Ter-Mkrtchyan; Germany |
| 57 kg | Şeref Eroğlu; Turkey | Marian Sandu; Romania | Rıfat Yıldız; Germany |
| 62 kg | Sergey Martynov; Russia | Hrihoriy Kamyshenko; Ukraine | Mkhitar Manukyan; Armenia |
| 68 kg | Attila Repka; Hungary | Aleksandr Tretyakov; Russia | Ghani Yalouz; France |
| 74 kg | Nazmi Avluca; Turkey | Vladimir Kopytov; Belarus | Erik Hahn; Germany |
| 82 kg | Hamza Yerlikaya; Turkey | Péter Farkas; Hungary | Gocha Tsitsiashvili; Israel |
| 90 kg | Gogi Koguashvili; Russia | Maik Bullmann; Germany | Vyacheslav Oliynyk; Ukraine |
| 100 kg | Sergey Lishtvan; Belarus | Igor Grabovetchi; Moldova | Andrzej Wroński; Poland |
| 130 kg | Alexandr Karelin; Russia | Petro Kotok; Ukraine | Sergei Mureiko; Moldova |

=== Women's freestyle ===
| Event | Gold | Silver | Bronze |
|---|---|---|---|
| 44 kg | Svetlana Kolatirina; Russia | Almuth Leitgeb; Austria | Yuliya Voitova; Ukraine |
| 47 kg | Angélique Berthenet; France | Olga Kosmak; Russia | Mette Barlie; Norway |
| 50 kg | Yelena Yegoshina; Russia | Tanja Sauter; Germany | Joanna Urbańska; Poland |
| 53 kg | Anna Gomis; France | Angela Lattanzio; Italy | Olga Smirnova; Russia |
| 57 kg | Sara Eriksson; Sweden | Lene Aanes; Norway | Natalia Ivanova; Russia |
| 61 kg | Nikola Hartmann; Austria | Anna Udycz; Poland | Elmira Mahammadova; Azerbaijan |
| 65 kg | Małgorzata Bassa-Roguska; Poland | Elmira Kurbanova; Russia | Sandra Gronert; Germany |
| 70 kg | Nina Englich; Germany | Yevgueniya Osipenko; Russia | Lise Legrand; France |
| 75 kg | Vanessa Civit; France | Tetiana Komarnytska; Ukraine | Monika Kowalska; Poland |
