= 1995 European Wrestling Championships =

- Host city: France, Besançon Greco-Roman; Switzerland, Fribourg Freestyle
- Dates: 26 – 30 April 1995; 8 – 11 April 1995

Champions
- Freestyle: Russia
- Greco-Roman: Russia

The 1995 European Wrestling Championships were held in the Greco-Romane in Besançon 26 – 30 April 1995; the men's Freestyle style in Fribourg 8 – 11 April 1995.

== Medal table ==
Rank	Nation	Gold	Silver	Bronze	Total
1	Russia	8	2	3	13
2	Ukraine	2	3	4	9
3	Azerbaijan	2	0	1	3
4	Turkey	1	4	0	5
5	Germany	1	3	3	7
6	Bulgaria	1	2	1	4
7	Armenia	1	1	1	3
8	Poland	1	1	0	2
9	France	1	0	0	1
9	Greece	1	0	0	1
9	Sweden	1	0	0	1
12	Georgia	0	1	0	1
12	Hungary	0	1	0	1
12	Romania	0	1	0	1
12	Slovakia	0	1	0	1
16	Belarus	0	0	4	4
17	Finland	0	0	1	1
17	Israel	0	0	1	1
17	Moldova	0	0	1	1
Totals (19 entries)		20	20	20	60

== Medal summary ==
=== Men's freestyle ===
Event	Gold	Silver	Bronze
48 kg	Vugar Orujov; Russia	László Óváry; Hungary	Viktor Yefteni; Ukraine
52 kg	Namig Abdullayev; Azerbaijan	Metin Topaktaş; Turkey	Ivan Tsonov; Bulgaria
57 kg	Aslanbek Fidarov; Ukraine	Serafim Barzakov; Bulgaria	Arif Abdullayev; Azerbaijan
62 kg	Magomed Azizov; Russia	Jürgen Scheibe; Germany	Sergey Smal; Belarus
68 kg	Vadim Bogiev; Russia	Yüksel Şanlı; Turkey	Arayik Gevorgyan; Armenia
74 kg	Alexander Leipold; Germany	Turan Ceylan; Turkey	Nasir Gadžihanov; Russia
82 kg	Magomed Ibragimov; Azerbaijan	Serhiy Hubrynyuk; Ukraine	Rasul Katinovasov; Russia
90 kg	Makharbek Khadartsev; Russia	Eldar Kurtanidze; Georgia	Sagid Murtazaliev; Ukraine
100 kg	David Musulbes; Russia	Milan Mazáč; Slovakia	Arawat Sabejew; Germany
130 kg	Mahmut Demir; Turkey	Mirabi Valiyev; Ukraine	Leri Khabelov; Russia

=== Men's Greco-Roman ===
Event	Gold	Silver	Bronze
48 kg	Ioannis Agatzanian; Greece	Zafar Guliev; Russia	Oleg Kutscherenko; Germany
52 kg	Armen Nazaryan; Armenia	Alfred Ter-Mkrtchyan; Germany	Andriy Kalashnykov; Ukraine
57 kg	Ruslan Khakymov; Ukraine	Aghasi Manukyan; Armenia	Jan Ulbrich; Germany
62 kg	Włodzimierz Zawadzki; Poland	Sergey Martynov; Russia	Igor Petrenko; Belarus
68 kg	Ghani Yalouz; France	Ryszard Wolny; Poland	Marko Yli-Hannuksela; Finland
74 kg	Stoyan Stoyanov; Bulgaria	Mircea Constantin; Romania	Vladimir Kopytov; Belarus
82 kg	Sergey Tsvir; Russia	Hristo Stanchev; Bulgaria	Gocha Tsitsiashvili; Israel
90 kg	Gogi Koguashvili; Russia	Maik Bullmann; Germany	Vyacheslav Oliynyk; Ukraine
100 kg	Mikael Ljungberg; Sweden	Georgiy Saldadze; Ukraine	Sergey Lishtvan; Belarus
130 kg	Aleksandr Karelin; Russia	Şaban Donat; Turkey	Sergei Mureiko; Moldova
