= Table tennis at the 1996 Summer Olympics – Women's doubles =

Table tennis at the Olympics

Table tennis – Women's doubles at the Games of the XXVI Olympiad
- Venue: Georgia World Congress Center
- Date: 23 to 29 July 1996
- Competitors: 62 from 24 nations

Medalists
1st place, gold medalist(s)		Deng Yaping; Qiao Hong	China
2nd place, silver medalist(s)		Liu Wei; Qiao Yunping	China
3rd place, bronze medalist(s)		Park Hae-jung; Ryu Ji-hae	South Korea

These are the results of the women's doubles competition, one of two events for female competitors in table tennis at the 1996 Summer Olympics in Atlanta.

== Group stage ==
=== Group A ===
Rank	Athlete	W	L	GW	GL	PW	PL	CHN	FRA	CAN
1	Deng Yaping and Qiao Hong (CHN)	2	0	4	0	86	39	X	2–0	2–0
2	Emmanuelle Coubat and Xiaoming Wang-Dréchou (FRA)	1	1	2	2	53	71	0–2	X	2–0
3	Barbara Chiu and Lijuan Geng (CAN)	0	2	0	4	57	86	0–2	0–2	X

=== Group B ===
Rank	Athlete	W	L	GW	GL	PW	PL	CHN	GER	GBR	CHI
1	Liu Wei and Qiao Yunping (CHN)	3	0	6	1	146	65	X	2–1	2–0	2–0
2	Olga Nemes and Jie Schopp (GER)	2	1	5	2	128	120	1–2	X	2–0	2–0
3	Andrea Holt and Lisa Lomas (GBR)	1	2	2	4	96	119	0–2	0–2	X	2–0
4	Berta Rodríguez and Sofija Tepes (CHI)	0	3	0	6	60	126	0–2	0–2	0–2	X

=== Group C ===
Rank	Athlete	W	L	GW	GL	PW	PL	HKG	PRK	SWE	PER
1	Chia Po Wa and Chan Tan Lui (HKG)	2	1	4	2	122	91	X	0–2	2–0	2–0
2	Kim Hyon and Tu Jong-Sil (PRK)	2	1	4	2	122	92	2–0	X	0–2	2–0
3	Pernilla Pettersson and Asa Svensson (SWE)	2	1	4	2	120	108	0–2	2–0	X	2–0
4	Eliana Gonzalez and Milagritos Gorriti (PER)	0	3	0	6	53	126	0–2	0–2	0–2	X

=== Group D ===
Rank	Athlete	W	L	GW	GL	PW	PL	KOR	TPE	ROU	UGA
1	Park Hae-Jung and Ryu Ji-Hae (KOR)	3	0	6	0	126	82	X	2–0	2–0	2–0
2	Bai Hui-yun and Xu Jing (TPE)	2	1	4	3	130	118	0–2	X	2–1	2–0
3	Emilia Ciosu and Georgeta Cojocaru (ROU)	1	2	3	4	132	118	0–2	1–2	X	2–0
4	Nadunga Kyadobye and Mary Musoke (UGA)	0	3	0	6	56	126	0–2	0–2	0–2	X

=== Group E ===
Rank	Athlete	W	L	GW	GL	PW	PL	TPE	HUN	PRK	AUS
1	Chen Chiu-tan and Chen Jing (TPE)	2	1	5	3	159	138	X	2–0	1–2	2–1
2	Csilla Bátorfi and Krisztina Tóth (HUN)	2	1	4	2	119	100	0–2	X	2–0	2–0
3	Kim Hyang and Son Mi (PRK)	2	1	4	4	141	149	2–1	0–2	X	2–1
4	Shirley Zhou and Stella Zhou (AUS)	0	3	2	6	123	155	1–2	0–2	1–2	X

=== Group F ===
Rank	Athlete	W	L	GW	GL	PW	PL	RUS	USA	NED	NGR
1	Irina Palina and Elena Timina (RUS)	3	0	6	0	126	75	X	2–0	2–0	2–0
2	Wei Wang and Lily Yip (USA)	2	1	4	4	130	137	0–2	X	2–1	2–1
3	Emily Noor and Huberta Vriesekoop (NED)	1	2	3	4	122	131	0–2	1–2	X	2–0
4	Bose Kaffo and Olufunke Oshonaike (NGR)	0	3	1	6	102	136	0–2	1–2	0–2	X

=== Group G ===
Rank	Athlete	W	L	GW	GL	PW	PL	JPN	GER	NED	ITA
1	Chire Koyama and Taeko Todo (JPN)	3	0	6	2	148	123	X	2–1	2–0	2–1
2	Elke Schall and Nicole Struse (GER)	2	1	5	3	160	124	1–2	X	2–1	2–0
3	Geertje Keen and Mirjam Hooman-Kloppenburg (NED)	1	2	3	5	126	161	0–2	1–2	X	2–1
4	Alessia Arisi and Laura Negrisoli (ITA)	0	3	2	6	129	155	1–2	0–2	1–2	X

=== Group H ===
Rank	Athlete	W	L	GW	GL	PW	PL	KOR	JPN	CRO	BRA
1	Kim Moo-Kyo and Park Kyung-Ae (KOR)	3	0	6	0	126	79	X	2–0	2–0	2–0
2	Fumiyo Kaizu and Rika Sato (JPN)	2	1	4	2	113	89	0–2	X	2–0	2–0
3	Eldijana Aganovic and Tamara Boroš (CRO)	1	2	2	4	101	117	0–2	0–2	X	2–0
4	Monica Doti and Lyanne Kosaka (BRA)	0	3	0	6	71	126	0–2	0–2	0–2	X

== Knockout stage ==
Quarterfinals
A1	Deng Yaping (CHN); Qiao Hong (CHN)	18	21	21	22	23
E1	Chen Chiu-tan (TPE); Chen Jing (TPE)	21	16	19	24	21
H1	Kim Moo-kyo (KOR); Park Kyung-ae (KOR)	21	21	21
C1	Chai Po Wa (HKG); Chan Tan Lui (HKG)	18	13	13
D1	Park Hae-jung (KOR); Ryu Ji-hae (KOR)	23	21	20	21
F1	Irina Palina (RUS); Elena Timina (RUS)	21	18	22	15
G1	Chire Koyama (JPN); Taeko Todo (JPN)	9	15	15
B1	Liu Wei (CHN); Qiao Yunping (CHN)	21	21	21

Semifinals
A1	Deng Yaping (CHN); Qiao Hong (CHN)	21	19	21	21
H1	Kim Moo-kyo (KOR); Park Kyung-ae (KOR)	15	21	15	19
D1	Park Hae-jung (KOR); Ryu Ji-hae (KOR)	13	21	20	11
B1	Liu Wei (CHN); Qiao Yunping (CHN)	21	16	22	21

Gold medal match
A1	Deng Yaping (CHN); Qiao Hong (CHN)	18	25	21	21
B1	Liu Wei (CHN); Qiao Yunping (CHN)	21	23	15	11
Bronze medal match
H1	Kim Moo-kyo (KOR); Park Kyung-ae (KOR)	16	8	21	13
D1	Park Hae-jung (KOR); Ryu Ji-hae (KOR)	21	21	14	21
