= 1993 European Wrestling Championships =

Wrestling Championship

- Host city: Turkey Istanbul, Greco-Roman;Freestyle; Russia Ivanovo, Women's Freestyle
- Dates: 7 – 16 May 1993; 22 – 23 May 1993

Champions
- Freestyle: Turkey
- Greco-Roman: Russia
- Women: Russia

The 1993 European Wrestling Championships were held in the Greco-Romane and the men's Freestyle style in Istanbul 7 – 16 May 1993; and the women's Freestyle style in Ivanovo 22 – 23 May 1993.

== Medal table ==
Rank	Nation	Gold	Silver	Bronze	Total
1	Russia	16	3	5	24
2	Turkey	3	3	3	9
3	Germany	3	0	0	3
4	Ukraine	2	10	4	16
5	Azerbaijan	1	2	0	3
6	Belarus	1	1	3	5
7	Bulgaria	1	1	1	3
8	Finland	1	0	0	1
8	Sweden	1	0	0	1
10	Greece	0	2	0	2
10	Hungary	0	2	0	2
12	France	0	1	4	5
13	Georgia	0	1	2	3
13	Moldova	0	1	2	3
15	Armenia	0	1	0	1
15	Israel	0	1	0	1
17	Luxembourg	0	0	1	1
17	Romania	0	0	1	1
17	Slovakia	0	0	1	1
17	Switzerland	0	0	1	1
Totals (20 entries)		29	29	28	86

== Medal summary ==
=== Men's freestyle ===
Event	Gold	Silver	Bronze
48 kg	Marian Avramov; Bulgaria	İlyas Şükrüoğlu; Turkey	Viktor Yefteni; Ukraine
52 kg	Ahmet Örel; Turkey	Sultan Davudov; Russia	Mijail Kushnir; Ukraine
57 kg	Remzi Musaoğlu; Turkey	Sergey Smal; Belarus	Abdulaziz Azizov; Russia
62 kg	Magomed Azizov; Russia	İlham Abbasov; Azerbaijan	Štefan Fernyák; Slovakia
68 kg	Zaza Zazirov; Ukraine	Arayik Gevorgyan; Armenia	Gocha Makoyev; Russia
74 kg	André Backhaus; Germany	János Nagy; Hungary	Victor Peicov; Moldova
82 kg	Rustem Kelejsayev; Russia	Sebahattin Öztürk; Turkey	Aleksandr Savko; Belarus
90 kg	Dzhambolat Tedeyev; Ukraine	Eldar Kurtanidze; Georgia	Kenan Şimşek; Turkey
100 kg	Arawat Sabejew; Germany	Alexei Nechipurenko; Ukraine	Ali Kayalı; Turkey
130 kg	Mahmut Demir; Turkey	Mirabi Valiyev; Ukraine	Guennadi Zhiltsov; Russia

=== Men's Greco-Roman ===
Event	Gold	Silver	Bronze
48 kg	Zafar Guliev; Russia	Nik Zagranitchni; Israel	Gela Papashvili; Georgia
52 kg	Natig Eyvazov; Azerbaijan	Andriy Kalashnykov; Ukraine	Samvel Danielyan; Russia
57 kg	Mikael Lindgren; Finland	Ruslan Khakymov; Ukraine	Marian Sandu; Romania
62 kg	Sergey Martynov; Russia	Jenő Bódi; Hungary	Gueorgui Saskavets; Belarus
68 kg	Islam Dugushiev; Russia	Oleg Tokarev; Moldova	Kamandar Madzhidov; Belarus
74 kg	Beslan Chaguiyev; Russia	Esad Aliyev; Azerbaijan	Stoyan Stoyanov; Bulgaria
82 kg	Thomas Zander; Germany	Hamza Yerlikaya; Turkey	Murat Kardanov; Russia
90 kg	Jörgen Olsson; Sweden	Ali Mollov; Bulgaria	Hakkı Başar; Turkey
100 kg	Sergey Demyashkevich; Belarus	Ibragim Shovjalov; Russia	Tenguiz Tedoradze; Georgia
130 kg	Alexandr Karelin; Russia	Petro Kotok; Ukraine	Sergei Mureiko; Moldova

=== Women's freestyle ===
Event	Gold	Silver	Bronze
44 kg	Tatiana Karamchakova; Russia	Liubov Shupina; Russia	Oxana Nazarko; Ukraine
47 kg	Tetei Alibekova; Russia	Svetlana Odai; Ukraine	Ulrike Boehme; Luxembourg
50 kg	Liliya Islamova; Russia	Anguela Belous; Ukraine	Anna Gomis; France
53 kg	Yelena Yegoshina; Russia	Tatiana Antonova; Ukraine	Agnès Canna-Ferina; France
57 kg	Natalia Vinogradova; Russia	Oxana Lapshina; Ukraine	Not awarded
61 kg	Zeinab Kazavatova; Russia	Evdokia Grigoria; Greece	Isabelle Dourthe; France
65 kg	Elmira Kurbanova; Russia	Sylvie Thomé; France	Nathalie Zengaffinnen; Switzerland
70 kg	Natalia Lazarenko; Russia	Evanguelía Nikolau; Greece	Svetlana Yashkina; Ukraine
75 kg	Yevgueniya Osipenko; Russia	Tetiana Komarnytska; Ukraine	Vanessa Civit; France
