= Yllescas =

Yllescas is a surname. Notable people with the surname include:

- Clarivett Yllescas (born 1993), Peruvian volleyball player
- Jorge Yllescas (born 1973), Peruvian wrestler
- Robert J. Yllescas (October 7, 1977 – December 1, 2008) was a US Army captain who served in the Afghanistan War
