= José Ochoa =

José Ochoa may refer to:

- José Ochoa (footballer) (1894-unknown), Spanish footballer and president of Recreativo de Huelva
- José Ochoa (wrestler) (born 1972), Venezuelan wrestler
