= Steven Mays =

American wrestler (born 1966)

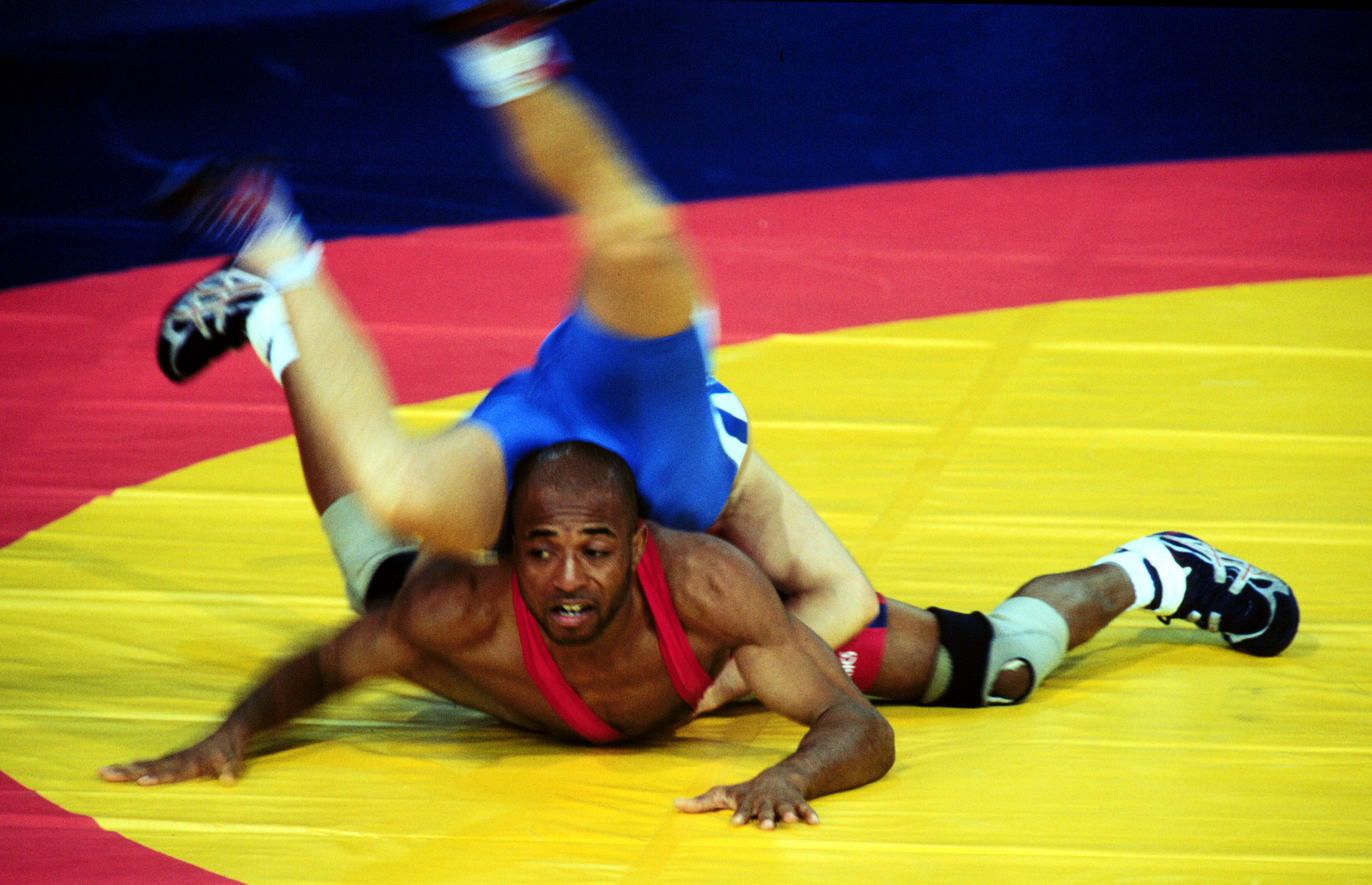
- Mays in red at the 2000 Summer Olympics

Personal information
- Born: June 17, 1966 (age 60) Pensacola, Florida, U.S.
- Home town: Kalamazoo, Michigan, U.S.

Sport
- Country: United States
- Sport: Wrestling
- Event: Greco-Roman
- Club: Navy Sports Club
- Team: USA
Medal record
Men's Greco-Roman wrestling
Representing United States
Pan American Games
Bronze medal – third place	1999 Winnipeg	54 kg

Steven Mays (born June 17, 1966) is an American wrestler. He competed in the men's Greco-Roman 54 kg at the 2000 Summer Olympics. Mays was a bronze medalist in the men's Greco-Roman 54 kg event at the 1999 Pan American Games. He competed on the All Navy Greco-Roman team from 1987–2001. In 2012, Mays was honored with the Outstanding American award by the National Wrestling Hall of Fame Michigan Chapter.
