= Majid Jahandideh =

Iranian wrestler (born 1968)

Personal information
- Nationality: Iranian
- Born: 7 August 1968 (age 57) Tehran, Iran

Sport
- Sport: Wrestling
Medal record
Representing Iran
Asian Championships
Bronze medal – third place	1992 Tehran	52 kg

Majid Jahandideh (Persian: مجید جهاندیده, born 7 August 1968) is an Iranian wrestler. He competed in the men's Greco-Roman 52 kg at the 1992 Summer Olympics.
