= Olaf Brandt =

German wrestler

Personal information
- Nationality: German
- Born: 2 July 1971 (age 55) Greifswald, Germany

Sport
- Sport: Wrestling

Olaf Brandt (born 2 July 1971) is a German wrestler. He competed in the men's Greco-Roman 52 kg at the 1992 Summer Olympics.
