= Samvel Danielyan =

Armenian-Russian Greco-Roman wrestler

Personal information
- Born: 4 February 1971 (age 55) Baku, Soviet Azerbaijan
- Height: 1.65 m (5 ft 5 in)
- Weight: 55 kg (121 lb)

Sport
- Sport: Wrestling
- Event: Greco-Roman
- Club: SKA Rostov-on-Don
- Coached by: Pjotr Tchinibaljan
Medal record
Men's Greco-Roman wrestling
Representing Russia
World Championships
Gold medal – first place	1995 Prague	52 kg
European Championships
Bronze medal – third place	1993 Istanbul	52 kg
Gold medal – first place	1999 Sofia	54 kg
World Cup
Silver medal – second place	1992 Besançon	52 kg
Representing Soviet Union
World Cup
Gold medal – first place	1991 Thessaloniki	52 kg

Samvel Danielyan (Armenian: Սամվել Դանիելյան, Russian: Самвел Владимирович Даниелян, born 4 February 1971) is a retired Armenian-Russian Greco-Roman wrestler. He is a three-time Russian Champion, World Cup winner, European Champion, and World Champion.

== Biography ==
Danielyan was born on 4 February 1971 in Baku. He started practicing Greco-Roman wrestling in 1978 under the teaching of Felix Avakov and the honored coach of the USSR, Edward Kasparov. In 1987, he was made a member of the Soviet junior team. He became a Junior European Champion in 1987, Espoir European Champion, Junior World Champion, and Espoir World Cup winner in 1989, and Junior European Champion again in 1989. During the First Nagorno-Karabakh War, he moved to Krasnodar in 1989, and later to Rostov-on-Don where he continued wrestling under Pjotr Tchinibaljan. In 1991, he won the Espoir World Championship and the Wrestling World Cup as a senior.

Starting in 1992, Danielyan transitioned to the Russian national team, winning silver at the World Cup that year and winning bronze at the 1993 European Wrestling Championships. Danielyan won the 1995 World Wrestling Championships gold medal, defeating Armen Nazaryan in the final round. At the 1996 Summer Olympics, Danielyan was defeated by Nazaryan, who would go on to win the Olympic gold medal, in the semifinals. Danielyan lost to Andriy Kalashnykov in the bronze medal match. He won the European Wrestling Championships in 1999.

He completed his career in 2001. In March 2008, he moved to Moscow, and has been working in the Sports School No.64 at the Ivan Yarygin Sports Palace.
