= Hiroshi Kado =

Japanese Greco-Roman wrestler

Medal record

Representing Japan

Men's Greco-Roman wrestling

World Championships
Silver medal – second place	1995 Prague	48 kg

Asian Championships
Bronze medal – third place	1996 Xiaoshan	48 kg

Hiroshi Kado (嘉戸 洋, Kado Hiroshi) (born September 20, 1971) is a Japanese Greco-Roman wrestler.

Kado won the silver medal in the Men's 48 kg Greco-Roman wrestling at the 1995 World Wrestling Championships held in Prague. Next year he completed in the Men's 48 kg Greco-Roman wrestling at the 1996 Summer Olympics but finished in 7th place, losing to two-time European Champion Zafar Guliyev of Russia in Round One.
