= Piotr Jabłoński =

Polish wrestler

Personal information
- Nationality: Polish
- Born: 15 January 1975 (age 51) Chełm, Poland

Sport
- Sport: Wrestling

Piotr Jabłoński (born 15 January 1975) is a Polish wrestler. He competed in the men's Greco-Roman 48 kg at the 1996 Summer Olympics.
