= Aleksandr Tsertsvadze =

Georgian wrestler

Personal information
- Nationality: Georgian
- Born: 7 October 1977 (age 48)

Sport
- Sport: Wrestling

Alexander Tsertsvadze (born 7 October 1977) is a Georgian amateur wrestler. He competed in the men's Greco-Roman 54 kg at the 2000 Summer Olympics.
