= Ibad Akhmedov =

Belarusian wrestler

Personal information
- Nationality: Belarusian
- Born: 18 January 1975 (age 51) Şirvan, Azerbaijani SSR, Soviet Union

Sport
- Sport: Wrestling

Ibad Amiravich Akhmedov (born 18 January 1975) is a Belarusian wrestler. He competed in the men's Greco-Roman 52 kg at the 1996 Summer Olympics.
