= Jotham Pellew =

New Zealand wrestler

Personal information
- Full name: Jotham Clement Pellew
- Born: 13 September 1978 Hamilton, New Zealand
- Died: 18 August 2006 (aged 27)
- Height: 175 cm (5 ft 9 in)
- Weight: 54 kg (119 lb)

Sport
- Country: New Zealand
- Sport: Wrestling
- Club: Hamilton Hawks

Jotham Clement Pellew (13 September 1978 – 18 August 2006) was a New Zealand wrestler. He competed in the men's Greco-Roman 54 kg at the 2000 Summer Olympics where he finished in 20th and last place. Pellew was educated at Ngaruawahia High School beginning in 1992. He died on 18 August 2006 and was buried at Hamilton Park Cemetery.
