= Viktor Yefteni =

Ukrainian wrestler (born 1973)

Personal information
- Nationality: Ukrainian
- Born: 2 February 1973 (age 53) Beșghioz, Moldavian SSR, Soviet Union

Sport
- Sport: Wrestling
Medal record
Men's wrestling
Representing Ukraine
Goodwill Games
| Silver medal – second place | 1994 Saint Petersburg | 48 kg |
European Championships
| Gold medal – first place | 1996 Budapest | 48 kg |
| Bronze medal – third place | 1993 Istanbul | 48 kg |
| Bronze medal – third place | 1994 Rome | 48 kg |
| Bronze medal – third place | 1995 Fribourg | 48 kg |

Viktor Mikhailovich Yefteni (Ukrainian: Віктор Михайлович Єфтені; born 2 February 1973) is a Ukrainian wrestler. He competed in the men's freestyle 48 kg at the 1996 Summer Olympics. He graduated from the K. D. Ushinsky South Ukrainian National Pedagogical University in 2009.
