= Saïd Tango =

Moroccan wrestler

Personal information
- Nationality: Moroccan
- Born: 24 March 1971 (age 55)

Sport
- Sport: Wrestling

Saïd Tango (born 24 March 1971) is a Moroccan wrestler. He competed in the men's Greco-Roman 52 kg at the 1992 Summer Olympics.
