= Bai Hui-yun =

Taiwanese table tennis player

Personal information
- Nationality: Taiwanese
- Born: 9 April 1973 (age 51)

Sport
- Sport: Table tennis

Bai Hui-yun (Chinese: 白慧嬰; born 9 April 1973) is a Taiwanese table tennis player. She competed in the women's doubles event at the 1996 Summer Olympics.
