= Zafar Guliev =

Russian wrestler of Azerbaijani descent (born 1972)

Medal record

Men's Greco-Roman wrestling

Representing Russia

Olympic Games
Bronze medal – third place	1996 Atlanta	48 kg

World Championships
Silver medal – second place	1993 Stockholm	48 kg
Bronze medal – third place	1995 Prague	48 kg

European Championships
Bronze medal – third place	1992 Copenhagen	48 kg
Gold medal – first place	1993 Istanbul	48 kg
Gold medal – first place	1994 Athens	48 kg
Silver medal – second place	1995 Besançon	48 kg
Gold medal – first place	1996 Budapest	48 kg

Zafar Safar oglu Guliyev (Azerbaijani: Zəfər Səfər oğlu Quliyev, Russian: Зафар Сафар оглы Гулиев; born June 17, 1972, in Lüvəsər, Azerbaijani SSR) is a Russian wrestler of Azerbaijani descent, who won a bronze medal at the 1996 Summer Olympics.
