= Remzi Öztürk =

Turkish wrestler

Personal information
- Nationality: Turkish
- Born: 2 May 1964 (age 62)

Sport
- Sport: Wrestling

Remzi Öztürk (born 2 May 1964) is a Turkish wrestler. He competed in the men's Greco-Roman 52 kg at the 1992 Summer Olympics.
