= Min Kyung-gab =

South Korean wrestler (born 1970)

- Hangul: 민경갑
- Hanja: 閔庚甲
- RR: Min Gyeonggap
- MR: Min Kyŏnggap

Min Kyung-gab
Medal record

Men's Greco-Roman wrestling

Representing South Korea

Olympic Games
Bronze medal – third place	1992 Barcelona	52 kg

Min Kyung-Gab (born 27 August 1970) is a South Korean former wrestler who competed in the 1992 Summer Olympics.
