= Nurym Dyusenov =

Kazakhstani wrestler

Personal information
- Full name: Nurym Dyusenov Saparovich
- Nationality: Kazakhstani
- Born: 17 November 1969 (age 56)

Sport
- Sport: Wrestling

Nurym Dyusenov (born 17 November 1969) is a Kazakhstani wrestler. Honored Trainer of the Republic of Kazakhstan. He competed in the men's Greco-Roman 52 kg at the 1996 Summer Olympics.
