= Raúl Martínez (wrestler) =

Cuban wrestler (born 1971)

Personal information
- Nationality: Cuban
- Born: 14 May 1971 (age 55) Santiago de Cuba, Cuba

Sport
- Sport: Wrestling
Medal record
Representing Cuba
World Championships
Gold medal – first place	1991 Varna	Flyweight
Gold medal – first place	1993 Stockholm	Flyweight
Pan American Games
Gold medal – first place	1991 Havana	Flyweight
Gold medal – first place	1995 Mar del Plata	Flyweight
Central American and Caribbean Games
Gold medal – first place	1990 Mexico City	Flyweight
Gold medal – first place	1993 Ponce	Flyweight

Raúl Francisco Martínez Alemán (born 14 May 1971) is a Cuban wrestler. He competed in the men's Greco-Roman 52 kg at the 1992 Summer Olympics.
