= Mujaahid Maynard =

American wrestler (born 1971)

Personal information
- Born: April 9, 1971 (age 55) Brooklyn, New York, U.S.
- Home town: Denver, Colorado, U.S.

Sport
- Country: United States
- Sport: Wrestling
- Weight class: 48 kg
- Event: Greco-Roman
- Club: Sunkist Kids Wrestling Club; U.S. Army WCAP
- Team: USA
Medal record
Men's Greco-Roman wrestling
Representing the United States
Pan American Games
Gold medal – first place	1995 Mar del Plata	48 kg

Mujaahid Maynard (born April 9, 1971) is an American wrestler. He competed in the men's Greco-Roman 48 kg at the 1996 Summer Olympics.
