= Ismo Kamesaki =

Finnish wrestler

Personal information
- Nationality: Finnish
- Born: 3 February 1970 (age 56) Kuusankoski, Finland

Sport
- Sport: Wrestling

Ismo Kamesaki (born 3 February 1970) is a Finnish wrestler. He competed in the men's Greco-Roman 52 kg at the 1992 Summer Olympics. He is of Japanese descent through his father, Katsuhiro.
