= Yordan Anev =

Bulgarian wrestler

Personal information
- Nationality: Bulgarian
- Born: 23 August 1973 (age 52) Peshtera, Bulgaria

Sport
- Sport: Wrestling

Yordan Anev (born 23 August 1973) is a Bulgarian wrestler. He competed in the men's Greco-Roman 52 kg at the 1996 Summer Olympics.
