= Rakymzhan Assembekov =

Kazakhstani wrestler

Personal information
- Nationality: Kazakhstani
- Born: 6 April 1978 (age 48) Shymkent, Kazakhstan

Sport
- Sport: Wrestling

Rakymzhan Assembekov (born 6 April 1978) is a Kazakhstani wrestler. He competed in the men's Greco-Roman 54 kg at the 2000 Summer Olympics, where he placed 9th.

In 1999, Assembekov won a bronze medal at the Asian Championships and placed fourth at the World Championships. He placed sixth at the 2000 Asian Championships, seventh at the 2001 World Championships, and 15th at the 2002 World Championships.
