= Tahir Zahidov =

Azerbaijani wrestler

Personal information
- Nationality: Azerbaijani
- Born: 10 February 1979 (age 47) Baku

Sport
- Sport: Wrestling

Tahir Zahidov (born 10 February 1979) is an Azerbaijani wrestler. He competed in the men's Greco-Roman 48 kg at the 1996 Summer Olympics.
