= Tiebiri Godswill =

Nigerian wrestler

Personal information
- Nationality: Nigerian
- Born: 22 August 1972 (age 53)

Sport
- Sport: Wrestling

Tiebiri Godswill (born 22 August 1972) is a Nigerian wrestler. He competed in the men's Greco-Roman 52 kg at the 1996 Summer Olympics.
