= Son Mi =

North Korean table tennis player

Personal information
- Nationality: North Korean
- Born: 13 September 1979 (age 45)

Sport
- Sport: Table tennis

Son Mi (born 13 September 1979) is a North Korean table tennis player. She competed in the women's doubles event at the 1996 Summer Olympics.
