= Shamsiddin Khudoyberdiev =

Uzbekistani sport wrestler

Medal record

Representing Uzbekistan

Men's Greco-Roman wrestling

Asian Games
| Bronze medal – third place | 1994 Hiroshima | 52 kg |

Asian Championships
| Gold medal – first place | 2003 Delhi | 60 kg |
| Silver medal – second place | 1999 Tashkent | 54 kg |

Shamsiddin Khudoyberdiyev (Uzbek: Шамсиддин Худойбердиев, born 8 February 1966, in Urgut, Samarqand, Uzbekistan) is an Uzbek wrestler who competed in the Greco-Roman 52 kg event at the 1996 Summer Olympics and finished 16th.
