= Natig Eyvazov =

Azerbaijani wrestler (born 1970)

Medal record

Men's Greco-Roman wrestling

Representing Azerbaijan

World Championships
Silver medal – second place	1994 Istanbul	52 kg

European Championships
Gold medal – first place	1993 İstanbul	52 kg
Silver medal – second place	1998 Minsk	54 kg
Bronze medal – third place	1999 Sofia	54 kg

Natig Eyvazov (Azerbaijani: Natiq Eyvazov; born 2 November 1970, Baku, Azerbaijani SSR) is an Azerbaijani wrestler.
