= Joel Basaldúa =

Peruvian wrestler

Personal information
- Nationality: Peruvian
- Born: 22 June 1974 (age 52)

Sport
- Sport: Wrestling

Joel Basaldúa (born 22 June 1974) is a Peruvian wrestler. He competed in the men's Greco-Roman 52 kg at the 1996 Summer Olympics.
