= Pernilla Pettersson =

Swedish table tennis player

Personal information
- Nationality: Swedish
- Born: 12 January 1972 (age 53)

Sport
- Sport: Table tennis

Pernilla Pettersson (born 12 January 1972) is a Swedish table tennis player. She competed in the women's doubles event at the 1996 Summer Olympics.
