= Senad Rizvanović =

Yugoslav wrestler (born 1968)

Medal record

Representing Yugoslavia

Men's Wrestling

European Championships
Gold medal – first place	1989 Oulu	52kg

Senad Rizvanović (April 24, 1968) is a Yugoslav former wrestler who competed in the 1992 Summer Olympics as an independent participant and won 8th place.
