= Wrestling at the 1996 Summer Olympics =

Wrestling at the Games of the XXVI Olympiad
- Venue: Georgia World Congress Center
- Dates: 20 July – 2 August 1996
- No. of events: 20
- Competitors: 401 from 75 nations

At the 1996 Summer Olympics, two different wrestling disciplines were contested: freestyle wrestling and Greco-Roman wrestling.

== Medalists ==
=== Freestyle ===
Event	Gold	Silver	Bronze
48 kg	Kim Il; North Korea	Armen Mkrtchyan; Armenia	Alexis Vila; Cuba
52 kg	Valentin Yordanov; Bulgaria	Namig Abdullayev; Azerbaijan	Maulen Mamyrov; Kazakhstan
57 kg	Kendall Cross; United States	Guivi Sissaouri; Canada	Ri Yong-sam; North Korea
62 kg	Tom Brands; United States	Jang Jae-sung; South Korea	Elbrus Tedeyev; Ukraine
68 kg	Vadim Bogiev; Russia	Townsend Saunders; United States	Zaza Zazirov; Ukraine
74 kg	Buvaisar Saitiev; Russia	Park Jang-soon; South Korea	Takuya Ota; Japan
82 kg	Khadzhimurad Magomedov; Russia	Yang Hyung-mo; South Korea	Amir Reza Khadem; Iran
90 kg	Rasoul Khadem; Iran	Makharbek Khadartsev; Russia	Eldar Kurtanidze; Georgia
100 kg	Kurt Angle; United States	Abbas Jadidi; Iran	Arawat Sabejew; Germany
130 kg	Mahmut Demir; Turkey	Aleksey Medvedev; Belarus	Bruce Baumgartner; United States

=== Greco-Roman ===
Event	Gold	Silver	Bronze
48 kg	Sim Kwon-ho; South Korea	Aleksandr Pavlov; Belarus	Zafar Guliev; Russia
52 kg	Armen Nazaryan; Armenia	Brandon Paulson; United States	Andriy Kalashnikov; Ukraine
57 kg	Yuriy Melnichenko; Kazakhstan	Dennis Hall; United States	Sheng Zetian; China
62 kg	Włodzimierz Zawadzki; Poland	Juan Marén; Cuba	Mehmet Akif Pirim; Turkey
68 kg	Ryszard Wolny; Poland	Ghani Yalouz; France	Aleksandr Tretyakov; Russia
74 kg	Filiberto Azcuy; Cuba	Marko Asell; Finland	Józef Tracz; Poland
82 kg	Hamza Yerlikaya; Turkey	Thomas Zander; Germany	Valery Tsilent; Belarus
90 kg	Vyacheslav Oliynyk; Ukraine	Jacek Fafiński; Poland	Maik Bullmann; Germany
100 kg	Andrzej Wroński; Poland	Sergey Lishtvan; Belarus	Mikael Ljungberg; Sweden
130 kg	Aleksandr Karelin; Russia	Matt Ghaffari; United States	Sergei Mureiko; Moldova

== Medal table ==
Rank	Nation	Gold	Silver	Bronze	Total
1	Russia	4	1	2	7
2	United States	3	4	1	8
3	Poland	3	1	1	5
4	Turkey	2	0	1	3
5	South Korea	1	3	0	4
6	Cuba	1	1	1	3
6	Iran	1	1	1	3
8	Armenia	1	1	0	2
9	Ukraine	1	0	3	4
10	Kazakhstan	1	0	1	2
10	North Korea	1	0	1	2
12	Bulgaria	1	0	0	1
13	Belarus	0	3	1	4
14	Germany	0	1	2	3
15	Azerbaijan	0	1	0	1
15	Canada	0	1	0	1
15	Finland	0	1	0	1
15	France	0	1	0	1
19	China	0	0	1	1
19	Georgia	0	0	1	1
19	Japan	0	0	1	1
19	Moldova	0	0	1	1
19	Sweden	0	0	1	1
Totals (23 entries)		20	20	20	60

== Participating nations ==
A total of 401 wrestlers from 75 nations competed at the Atlanta Games:

- Albania (1)
- Algeria (2)
- American Samoa (1)
- Argentina (1)
- Armenia (8)
- Australia (9)
- Azerbaijan (8)
- Belarus (16)
- Belgium (1)
- Bosnia and Herzegovina (1)
- Bulgaria (11)
- Cambodia (1)
- Cameroon (1)
- Canada (14)
- China (5)
- Colombia (3)
- Croatia (1)
- Cuba (15)
- Cyprus (1)
- Czech Republic (3)
- Dominican Republic (1)
- Egypt (1)
- Estonia (4)
- Finland (5)
- France (2)
- Georgia (8)
- Germany (11)
- Great Britain (1)
- Greece (10)
- Guam (1)
- Guatemala (1)
- Guinea-Bissau (1)
- Hungary (11)
- India (1)
- Iran (10)
- Israel (1)
- Italy (4)
- Japan (12)
- Kazakhstan (11)
- Kyrgyzstan (4)
- Latvia (1)
- Lithuania (3)
- Macedonia (3)
- Mexico (7)
- Moldova (6)
- Mongolia (4)
- Morocco (5)
- Nigeria (4)
- North Korea (3)
- Norway (1)
- Pakistan (1)
- Panama (1)
- Peru (5)
- Poland (11)
- Portugal (1)
- Puerto Rico (5)
- Romania (10)
- Russia (20)
- Senegal (2)
- Slovakia (4)
- South Africa (1)
- South Korea (15)
- Sweden (7)
- Switzerland (2)
- Syria (2)
- Tajikistan (1)
- Tunisia (3)
- Turkey (13)
- Turkmenistan (1)
- Ukraine (17)
- United States (20)
- Uzbekistan (10)
- Venezuela (6)
- Yemen (1)
- FR Yugoslavia (2)
