= José Ochoa (wrestler) =

Venezuelan wrestler

Personal information
- Nationality: Venezuelan
- Born: 2 February 1972 (age 54)

Sport
- Sport: Wrestling

José Ochoa (born 2 February 1972) is a Venezuelan wrestler. He competed in the men's Greco-Roman 48 kg at the 1996 Summer Olympics.
