= Kang Yong-gyun =

North Korean wrestler (born 1974)

- Hangul: 강영균
- RR: Gang Yeonggyun
- MR: Kang Yŏnggyun

Kang Yong-gyun
Medal record

Men's Greco-Roman wrestling

Representing North Korea

Olympic Games
Bronze medal – third place	2000 Sydney	54 kg

Asian Games
Silver medal – second place	2002 Busan	55 kg
Silver medal – second place	1998 Bangkok	54 kg

Asian Championships
Gold medal – first place	2001 Ulaanbaatar	54 kg
Silver medal – second place	1996 Xiaoshan	48 kg

Kang Yong-gyun (Korean: 강영균; born July 23, 1974) is a North Korean wrestler who competed in the Men's Graeco-Roman 54 kg at the 2000 Summer Olympics and won the bronze medal. He finished 4th at the 1996 Summer Olympics at 48 kg. He was two-time gold medallist at the World Military Games and two-time silver medallist at the 1998 and 2002 Asian Games.
