= Lüvəsər =

- Municipality
- Location within Azerbaijan
- Coordinates: 38°42′00″N 48°48′46″E
- Country: Azerbaijan
- Rayon: Lankaran

Population
  - Total: 1,121
- Time zone: UTC+4 (AZT)
  - Summer (DST): UTC+5 (AZT)

Lüvəsər is a village and municipality in the Lankaran Rayon of Azerbaijan. It has a population of 1,121.
