= Ramón Meña =

Panamanian wrestler (born 1967)

Personal information
- Nationality: Panamanian
- Born: 14 December 1967 (age 58)

Sport
- Sport: Wrestling
Medal record
Representing Panama
Pan American Games
Silver medal – second place	1987 Indianapolis	Greco-Roman -57kg
Silver medal – second place	1991 Havana	Greco-Roman -52kg
Central American and Caribbean Games
Bronze medal – third place	1993 Ponce	Greco-Roman -57kg

Ramón Meña (born 14 December 1967) is a Panamanian wrestler. He competed at the 1988 Summer Olympics and the 1992 Summer Olympics.
