= Mohamed Abou El-Ela =

Egyptian wrestler

Mohamed Abou Elela
Personal information
- Nationality: Egyptian
- Born: 25 June 1980 (age 46)
- Height: 1.68 m (5 ft 6 in)
- Weight: 54 kg (119 lb)

Sport
- Sport: Wrestling

Mohamed Moustafa Abou Elela (born 25 June 1980) is an Egyptian wrestler. He competed in the 2000 Summer Olympics.
