= Milagritos Gorriti =

Peruvian table tennis player

Personal information
- Nationality: Peruvian
- Born: 25 September 1973 (age 51)

Sport
- Sport: Table tennis

Milagritos Gorriti (born 25 September 1973) is a Peruvian table tennis player. She competed in the women's doubles event at the 1996 Summer Olympics.
