= Gela Papashvili =

Georgian wrestler

Personal information
- Nationality: Georgian
- Born: 14 April 1969 (age 55); Tbilisi, Georgia

Sport
- Sport: Wrestling

Gela Papashvili (born 14 April 1969) is a Georgian wrestler. He competed in the men's Greco-Roman 48 kg at the 1996 Summer Olympics.
