= Jorge Yllescas =

Peruvian wrestler

Personal information
- Nationality: Peruvian
- Born: 22 August 1973 (age 52)

Sport
- Sport: Wrestling

Jorge Yllescas (born 22 August 1973) is a Peruvian wrestler. He competed in the men's Greco-Roman 48 kg at the 1996 Summer Olympics.
