= Valentin Rebegea =

Romanian wrestler

Personal information
- Nationality: Romanian
- Born: 15 May 1971 (age 53)

Sport
- Sport: Wrestling

Valentin Rebegea (born 15 May 1971) is a Romanian wrestler. He competed at the 1992 Summer Olympics and the 1996 Summer Olympics.
