= Francesco Costantino =

Italian wrestler

Personal information
- Nationality: Italian
- Born: 20 September 1972 (age 53) Bari, Italy

Sport
- Sport: Wrestling

Francesco Costantino (born 20 September 1972) is an Italian wrestler. He competed in the men's Greco-Roman 48 kg at the 1996 Summer Olympics.
