= Aleksandr Pavlov (wrestler) =

Belarusian wrestler (born 1973)

Medal record

Men's Greco-Roman wrestling

Representing Belarus

Olympic Games
| Silver medal – second place | 1996 Atlanta | 48 kg |

World Championships
| Silver medal – second place | 1994 Tampere | 48 kg |

Aleksandr Pavlov (born July 9, 1973) is a Belarusian wrestler. At the 1996 Summer Olympics he won the silver medal in the men's Greco-Roman Light Flyweight (under 48 kg) category. Pavlov also won a silver medal in the same weight category at the 1994 World Championships.
