= North Korea at the 1996 Summer Olympics =

- IOC code: PRK
- NOC: Olympic Committee of the Democratic People's Republic of Korea

in Atlanta
- Competitors: 24 in 9 sports
- Flag bearer: Chae Ra-U (Table Tennis Official)
- Medals Ranked 33rd: Gold 2 Silver 1 Bronze 2 Total 5

Summer Olympics appearances (overview)
- 1972; 1976; 1980; 1984–1988; 1992; 1996; 2000; 2004; 2008; 2012; 2016; 2020; 2024; 2028

North Korea competed as the Democratic People's Republic of Korea at the 1996 Summer Olympics in Atlanta, United States.

== Medalists ==
=== Medalists ===
Medal	Name	Sport	Event	Date
Gold	Kye Sun-hui	Judo	Women's 48 kg	26 July
Gold	Kim Il	Wrestling	Men's freestyle 48 kg	31 July
Silver	Kim Myong-nam	Weightlifting	Men's 70 kg	23 July
Bronze	Jon Chol-ho	Weightlifting	Men's 76 kg	24 July
Bronze	Ri Yong-sam	Wrestling	Men's freestyle 57 kg	31 July

=== Medals by sport ===
Medals by sport
Sport	Gold	Silver	Bronze	Total
Judo	1	0	0	1
Weightlifting	0	1	1	2
Wrestling	1	0	1	2
Total	2	1	2	5

=== Medals by day ===
Medals by day
Day	Date	Gold	Silver	Bronze	Total
1	23 July	0	1	0	1
2	24 July	0	0	1	1
3	26 July	1	0	0	1
4	31 July	1	0	1	2
	Total	2	1	2	5

=== Medals by gender ===
Medals by gender
Gender	Gold	Silver	Bronze	Total
Female	1	0	0	1
Male	1	1	2	4
Total	2	1	2	5

== Results by event ==
=== Athletics ===
Men's Marathon

- Kim Jung-Won → 38th place (2:19.54)
- Kim Jong-Su → 40th place (2:20.19)

Women's Marathon

- Jong Song-Ok → 20th place (2:35.31)
- Kim Chang-Ok → 26th place (2:36.31)

=== Boxing ===
Men's Bantamweight (54 kg)

- Jong Gil Hoe

- First Round — Lost to Zahir Raheem (United States) on points (4-19)

=== Diving ===
Women's 3m Springnboard

- Ri Ok-Rim

- Preliminary Heat — 219.63 (→ did not advance, 22nd place)

Women's 10m Platform

- Ri Ok-Rim

- Preliminary Heat — 230.16 (→ did not advance, 23rd place)
