= Alfred Ter-Mkrtchyan =

Armenian Greco-Roman wrestler (born 1971)

Personal information
- Born: 19 March 1971 (age 55) Yerevan, Armenian SSR, Soviet Union
- Height: 1.64 m (5 ft 5 in)
- Weight: 54 kg (119 lb)

Sport
- Sport: Wrestling
- Event: Greco-Roman
- Club: Dynamo Moscow; VfK 07 Schifferstadt; KSV Köllerbach
- Coached by: Frank Hartmann
Medal record
Men's Greco-Roman wrestling
Representing Soviet Union
European Championships
Bronze medal – third place	1991 Aschaffenburg	52 kg
Representing Unified Team
Olympic Games
Silver medal – second place	1992 Barcelona	52 kg
European Championships
Gold medal – first place	1992 Copenhagen	52 kg
Representing Germany
World Championships
Bronze medal – third place	1993 Stockholm	52 kg
Gold medal – first place	1994 Tampere	52 kg
Bronze medal – third place	1995 Prague	52 kg
Bronze medal – third place	1997 Wrocław	54 kg
Bronze medal – third place	1999 Athens	54 kg
European Championships
Bronze medal – third place	1994 Athens	52 kg
Silver medal – second place	1995 Besançon	52 kg
Bronze medal – third place	1996 Budapest	52 kg
Bronze medal – third place	2000 Moscow	54 kg

Alfred Ter-Mkrtchyan (Armenian: Ալֆրեդ Տեր-Մկրտչյան, born 19 March 1971) is a former Armenian Greco-Roman wrestler for the Soviet Union, Unified Team, and Germany. He is an Olympic silver medalist and European Champion for the Unified Team and World Champion for Germany.

== Biography ==
Ter-Mkrtchyan was born on 19 March 1971 in Yerevan. In 1985, he took up Greco-Roman wrestling in Moscow and became fascinated with the sport. He won the Junior European Championships in 1990 and competed as a senior from then on. He became a member of the Soviet national Greco-Roman wrestling team soon afterward. Following the collapse of the Soviet Union, he won a gold medal at the 1992 European Wrestling Championships and competed for the Unified Team at the 1992 Summer Olympics in Barcelona. Ter-Mkrtchyan advanced to the finals, where he faced reigning Olympic Champion Jon Rønningen. Ter-Mkrtchyan was ahead 1-0 for most of the fight but Rønningen scored 2 points in the final seven seconds, resulting in Ter-Mkrtchyan's defeat. He won an Olympic silver medal. Ter-Mkrtchyan received Armenian citizenship that same year. He later went with his parents to the United States.

Seeking a better wrestling environment, he got in touch with his former Soviet national teammate Arawat Sabejew, who had been living in Germany. Sabejew recommended him to the German Federal Government and, in 1993, Ter-Mkrtchyan received German citizenship with the help of the Chairman of German wrestling club VfK Schifferstadt, Litzenburger Robert, who had good relations with various government authorities. Ter-Mkrtchyan was naturalized in November 1993. In Germany, he wrestled for the first for VfK Schifferstadt, but changed clubs to KSV Köllerbach.

Ter-Mkrtchyan continued to have a successful wrestling career in Germany. He won a gold medal at the 1994 World Wrestling Championships in Tampere. He became the first German to become a World Wrestling Champion at bantamweight (52 kg).

He competed at the 1996 Summer Olympics in Atlanta, but didn't win a medal. Ter-Mkrtchyan lost in the first round, but dominated Rønningen with a score of 9-0 in the second. He ended up in ninth place.

Ter-Mkrtchyan returned to the Olympics a third time at the 2000 Summer Olympics in Sydney. He made it to the quarterfinals, where he was defeated by eventual gold medalist Sim Kwon-Ho of South Korea. Ter-Mkrtchyan was ahead in the first round with a score of 3-2, but was defeated in the end by score of 4-6. He won the fifth place match afterward.

His sporting ambitions were slowed by knee surgery in early 2001. He often had injury problems during the further course of his career. After failing to qualify for the 2004 Summer Olympics, Ter-Mkrtchyan retired from competitive wrestling.
