= Ulises Valentin =

Dominican Republic wrestler

Personal information
- Nationality: Dominican
- Born: 6 June 1968 (age 57)

Sport
- Sport: Wrestling

Ulises Valentin (born 6 June 1968) is a Dominican Republic wrestler. He competed at the 1992 Summer Olympics and the 1996 Summer Olympics.
