= Ioannis Agatzanian =

Greek wrestler (born 1971)

Personal information
- Born: 21 March 1971 (age 55) Yerevan, Armenian SSR, Soviet Union
- Height: 1.60 m (5 ft 3 in)
- Weight: 53 kg (117 lb)

Sport
- Sport: Wrestling
- Event: Greco-Roman
- Club: Prodos Athens
- Coached by: Robert Asriyan; Robert Nersesyan
Medal record
Men's Greco-Roman wrestling
Representing Greece
European Championships
Bronze medal – third place	1994 Athens	48 kg
Gold medal – first place	1995 Besançon	48 kg
Silver medal – second place	1996 Budapest	48 kg

Ioannis (Vardan) Agatzanian (Armenian: Վարդան Աղաջանյան, Greek: Ιωάννης Αγκατζανιαν; born 21 March 1971) is a retired Armenian-born Greek Greco-Roman wrestler. He became a European Champion in 1995 and competed at the 1996 Olympics.

== Biography ==
Vardan Agatzanian was born on 21 March 1971 in Yerevan, Armenia. He started practicing Greco-Roman wrestling at the age of 10 years under the leadership of Robert Asriyan, and in the future he was also taught by Robert Nersesyan. In 1988, he was the world champion among juniors (under 18).

He moved to Greece in 1993 and later played for the country under the name of Ioannis Agatzanian. Agatzanian won three medals at the European Wrestling Championships, winning bronze in 1994, gold in 1995, and silver in 1996. He participated at the 1996 Summer Olympics in Atlanta, where he came in 8th place at 48 kg.

In 1997, after a decision was made to reduce the number of weight categories and resulted in the elimination of flyweight category, Agatzanian, as well as many flyweight wrestlers, was forced to finish his career. After retiring from the sport, he engaged in business activity in Greece and Armenia.
