= Andriy Kalashnikov =

Ukrainian wrestler (born 1964)

Medal record

Men's Greco-Roman wrestling

Representing Ukraine

Olympic Games
Bronze medal – third place	1996 Atlanta	52 kg

World Championships
Bronze medal – third place	1994 Tampere	52 kg

European Championships
Gold medal – first place	1996 Budapest	52 kg
Silver medal – second place	1993 Istanbul	52 kg
Bronze medal – third place	1995 Besançon	52 kg

Representing Soviet Union

European Championships
Gold medal – first place	1987 Tampere	52 kg

Andriy Mykolaiovych Kalashnikov (Ukrainian: Калашніков Андрій Миколайович; born November 20, 1964) is a former Ukrainian wrestler and Olympic medalist. He received a bronze medal at the 1996 Summer Olympics in Atlanta. He trained at Sports Club Kolos Kiev.
