= Women's sports =

Sports participated by women and girls

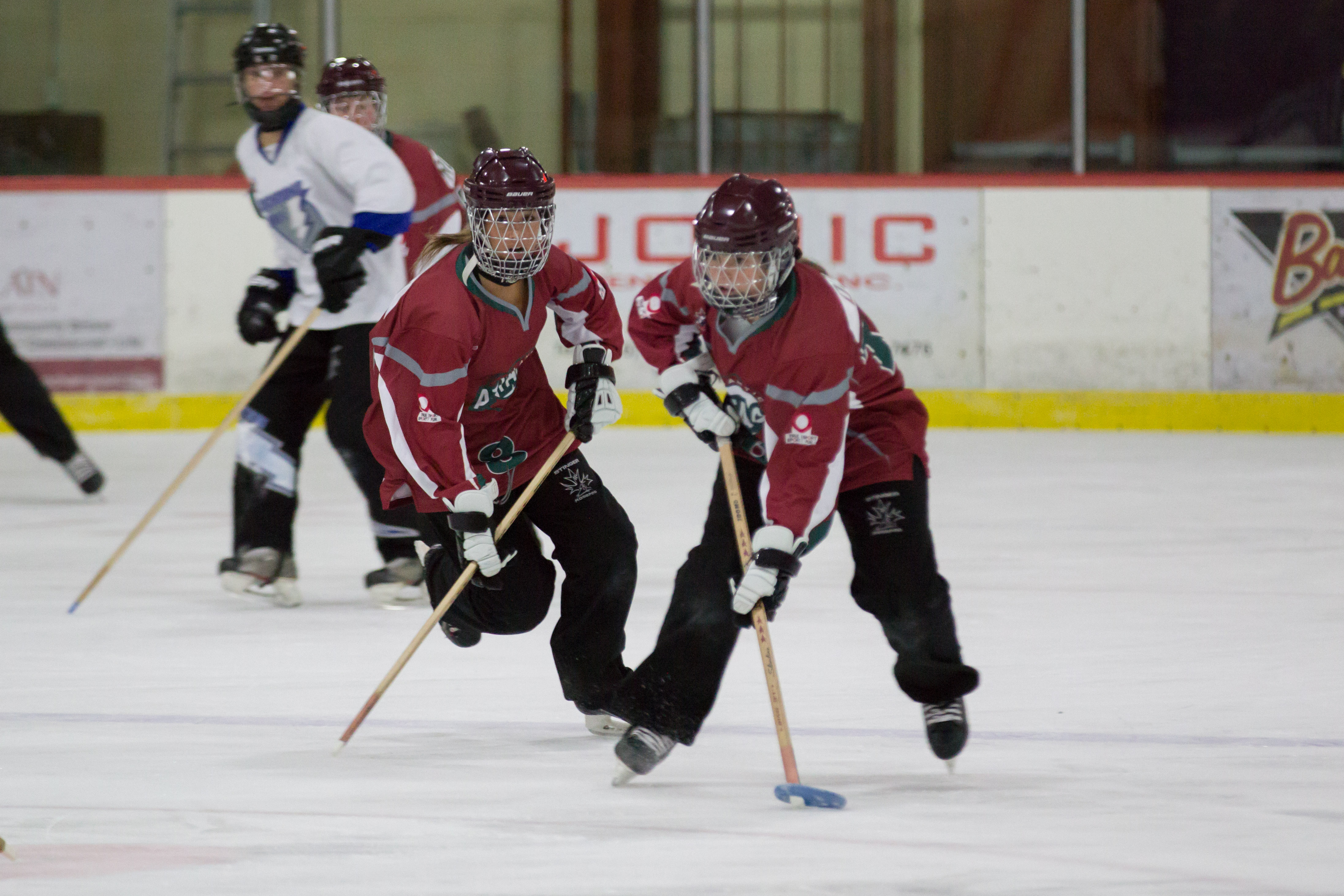
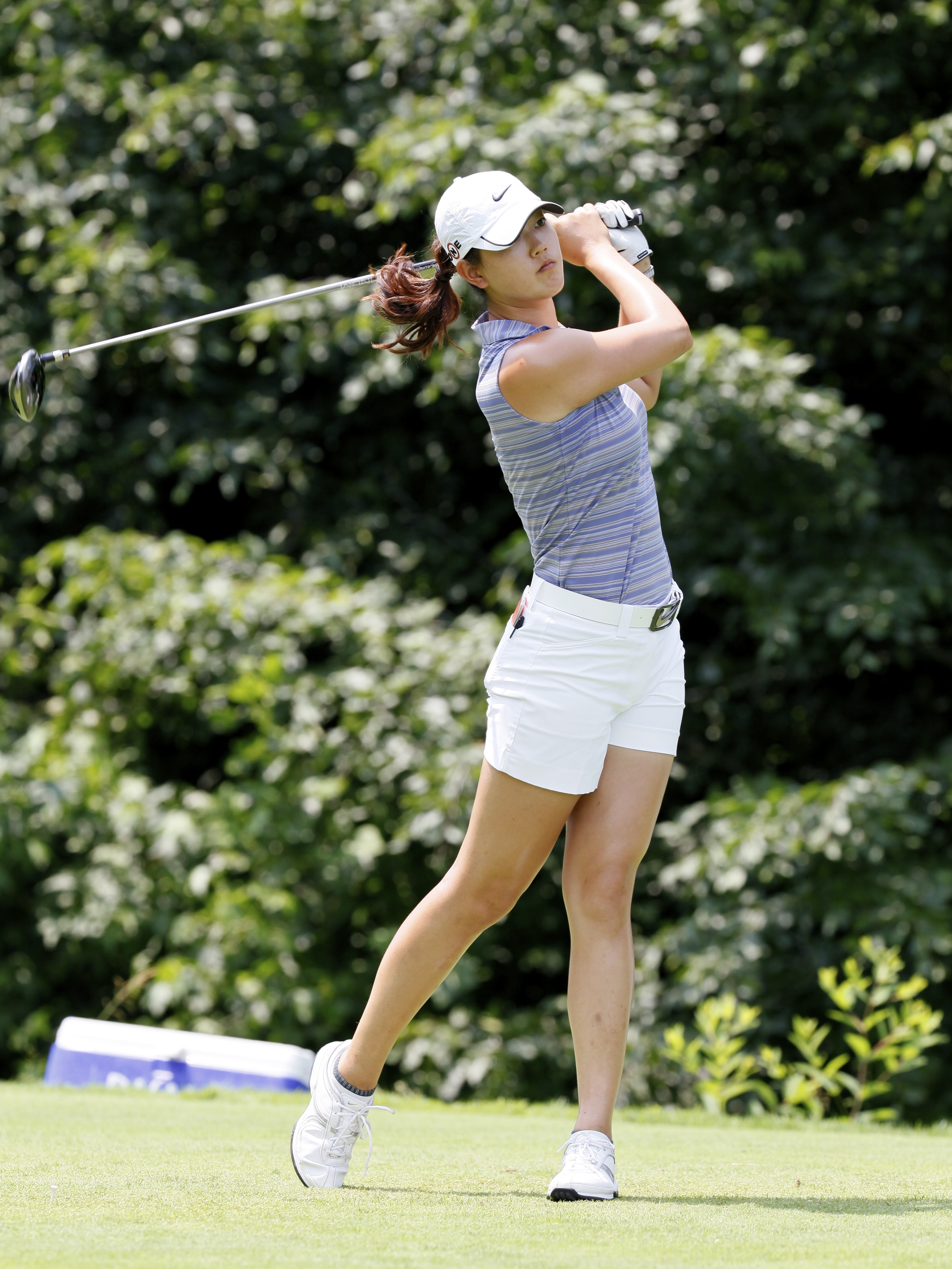
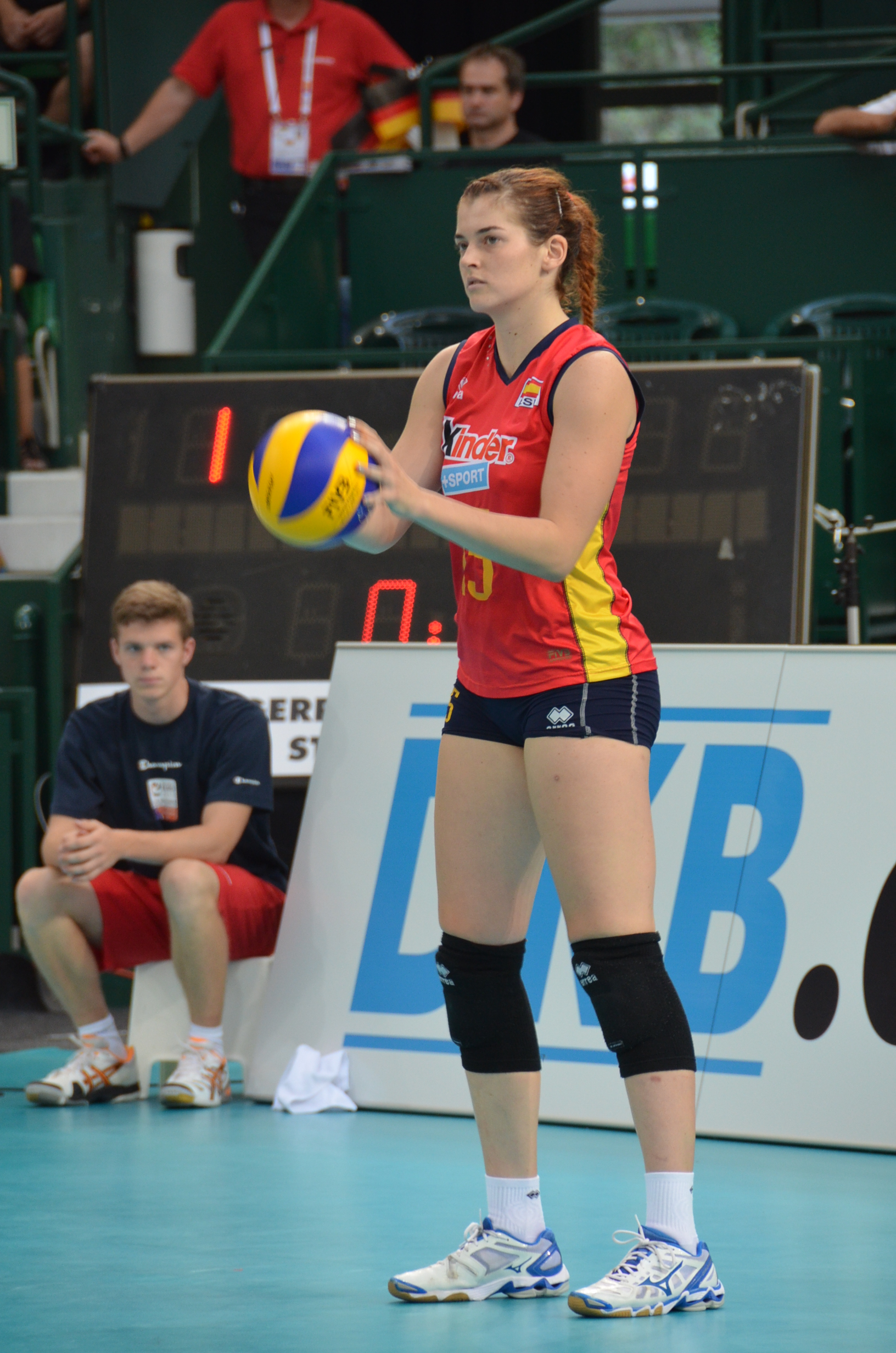
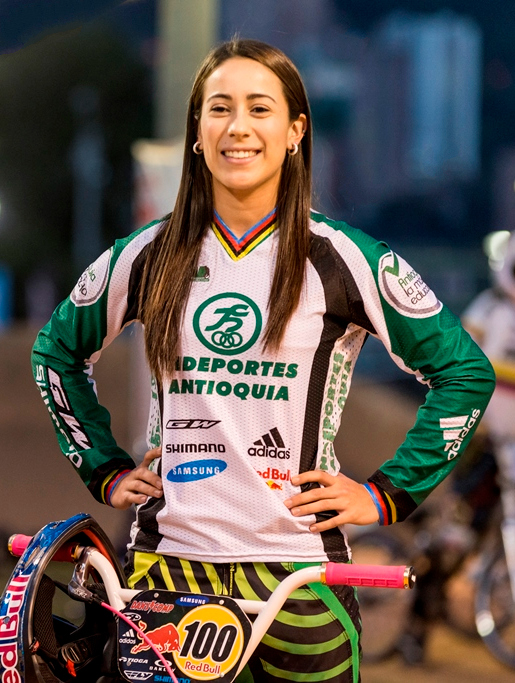
Left to right; top to bottom: Canadian women playing ringette; U.S. golfer, Michelle Wie West; Spanish volleyball player, Mireya Delgado; Colombian cyclist Mariana Pajón

The participation of women and girls in sports, physical fitness, and exercise has existed throughout history. However, participation rates and activities vary in accordance with nation, era, geography, and stage of economic development.

Until roughly 1870, women's activities tended to be informal and recreational in nature, lacked rules codes, and emphasized physical activity rather than competition. Today, women's sports are more sport-specific and have developed into both amateur levels and professional levels in various places internationally, but is found primarily within developed countries where conscious organization and accumulation of wealth has occurred. In the mid-to-latter part of the 20th century, female participation in sport and the popularization of their involvement increased, particularly during its last quarter. Very few organized sports have been invented by women. Sports such as Newcomb ball, netball, acrobatic gymnastics, and tumbling, and possibly stoolball, are examples.

Women's involvement in sports is more visible in well-developed countries and today their level of participation and performance still varies greatly by country and by sport. Despite an increase in women's participation in sport, the male demographic is still the larger of the two. These demographic differences are observed globally. Female dominated sports are the one exception. Girls' participation in sports tends to be higher in the United States than in other parts of the world like Western Europe and Latin America. Girls' participation in more violent contact sports is far less than that of their male counterparts.

Two important divisions exist in relation to female sporting categories. These sports either emerged exclusively as an organized female sport with male exclusion or were developed as an organized female variant of a sport first popularized by a male demographic and therefore became a female category. In all but a few exceptional cases, such as in the case of camogie, a female variant, or "women's game" uses the same name of the sport popularly played by men, but is classified into a different category which is differentiated by sex: men's or women's, or girls or boys. Female variants are widely common while organized female sports by comparison are rare and include team sports such as netball, throwball, artistic (née synchronized) swimming, and ringette. In female sports, the supposed benefits of gender parity, gender equity and sex segregation are controversial.

Except in a few rare cases like women's professional tennis, professional women's sport rarely provide competitors with a livable income. In addition, competing for media coverage of the women's variant of a sport which is primarily popular among males, creates complex barriers. More recently, there has been an increasing amount of interest, research, investment and production in regards to equipment design for female athletes. Interest and research involving the identification of sex-specific injuries, particularly though not exclusively among high performance female athletes, has increased as well, such as in the case of concussions and the female athlete triad, a.k.a. "Relative energy deficiency in sport" (RED-S).

At times female athletes have engaged in social activism in conjunction with their participation in sport. Protest methods have included playing strikes, social media campaigns, and in the case of America, federal lawsuits on grounds of inequality, usually as it relates to gender parity principles, American law and Title IX which demand schools that any funds given to support students' sports should be equally distributed between boys and girls. Public service oriented promotional campaigns for girls in sport involve a variety of media campaign styles.

== History ==
=== Ancient civilizations ===
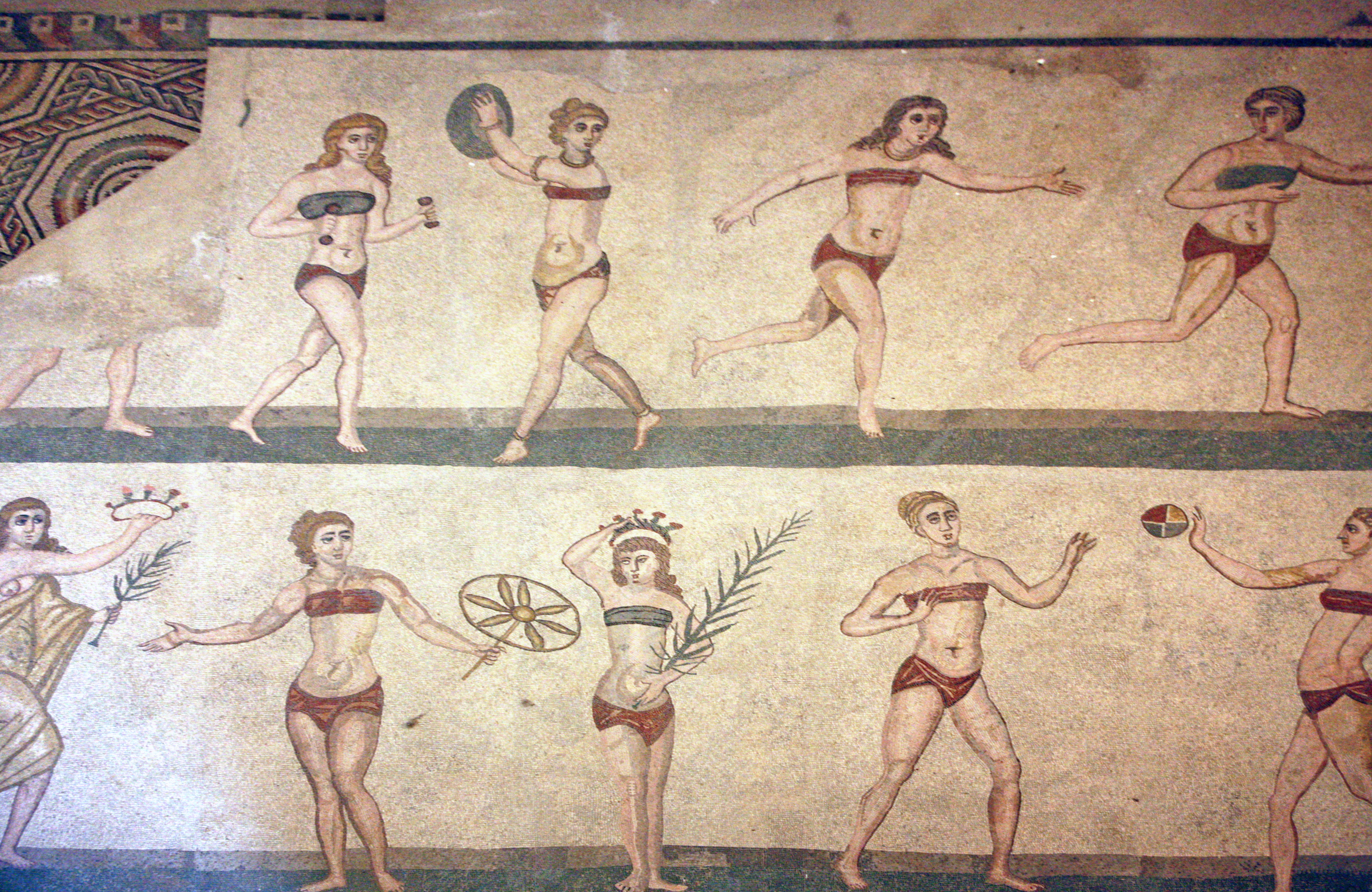
Roman women engaged in sports. Mosaic at the Villa Romana del Casale near Piazza Armerina in Sicily.

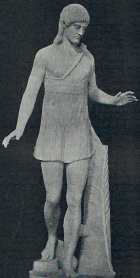
A statue of a victress of the Heraean Games, represented near the start of a race

Before each ancient Olympic Games a separate women's athletic event was held at the stadium in Olympia, called the Heraean Games and dedicated to the goddess Hera. In ancient Greek mythology there was the belief that Heraea was founded by Hippodameia, the wife of the king who founded the Olympics. According to E. Norman Gardiner:

At the festival there were races for maidens of various ages. Their course was 500 feet, or one-sixth less than the men's stadium. The maidens ran with their hair down their backs, a short tunic reaching just below the knee, and their right shoulder bare to the breast. The victors received crowns of olive and a share of the heifer sacrificed to Hera. They had, too, the right of setting up their statues in the Heraeum.

Although married women were excluded from the Olympics even as spectators, Cynisca won an Olympic game as owner of a chariot (champions of chariot races were owners not riders), as did Euryleonis, Belistiche, Zeuxo, Encrateia and Hermione, Timarete, Theodota and Kassia.

After the classical period, there was some participation by women in men's athletic festivals. Women in Sparta began to practice the same athletic exercises that men did, exhibiting the qualities of Spartan soldiers. Plato even supported women in sports by advocating running and sword-fighting for women.

Notably, cultural representations of a pronounced female physicality were not limited to sport in Ancient Greece and can also be found in representations of a group of female warriors known as the Amazons.

In Book Six of the Odyssey, Nausicaa and her handmaidens engage in light sport as they're waiting for the clothes they've washed to dry:

Then they bathed, and gave

Their limbs the delicate oil, and took their meal
Upon the river's border—while the robes
Beneath the sun's warm rays were growing dry.
And now, when they were all refreshed by food,
Mistress and maidens laid their veils aside
And played at ball.

=== Early modern ===
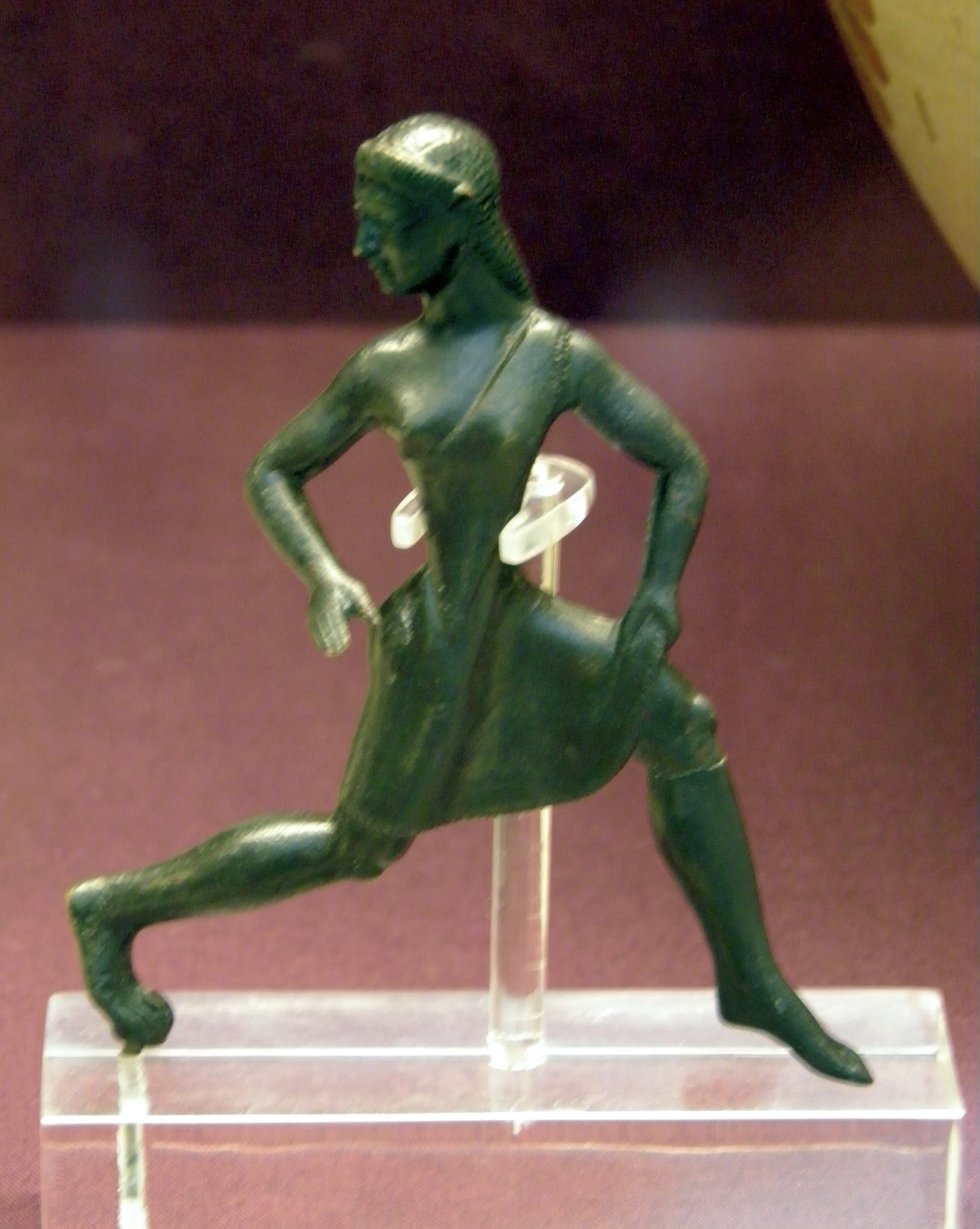
A Greek bronze figurine depicting a woman running. The bare right breast is indicative of her being an athlete.

During the Song, Yuan, and Ming dynasties, women played in professional Cuju teams. Cuju, also known as Tsu Chu, was an ancient Chinese ball game that is considered to be the predecessor of modern-day football (soccer). The sport of Cuju reached climax in the Song dynasty and was one of the most popular sports in Chinese society during that time. It was first recorded in the 3rd century BC and was played by both men and women. Women's Cuju was different from men's Cuju in a few ways. First, the women's ball was smaller and lighter. Second, the women played with smaller teams and on a smaller field. Third, the women were not allowed to use their hands or feet to touch the ball. Instead, they used their heads and chests to control the ball. Women's Cuju was a popular sport for centuries in China. It was played by women of all social classes and ages. The game was often played during festivals and holidays.

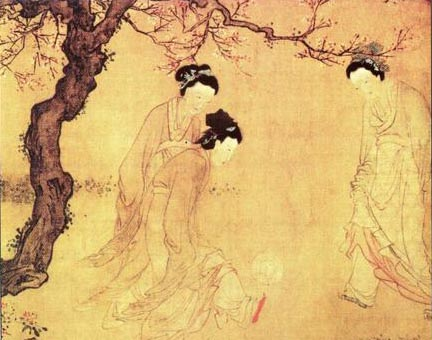
Chinese ladies playing cuju, by the Ming dynasty painter Du Jin

=== Modern era ===
==== Late 18th century ====
The educational committees of the French Revolution (1789) included intellectual, moral, and physical education for both girls and boys. With the victory of Napoleon less than twenty years later, physical education was reduced to military preparedness for boys and men. In Germany, the physical education of GutsMuths (1793) included girl's education. This included the measurement of performances of girls. This led to women's sport being more actively pursued in Germany than in most other countries. When the Fédération Sportive Féminine Internationale was formed as an all women's international organization it had a German male vice-president in addition to German international success in elite sports.

==== 19th and early 20th centuries ====
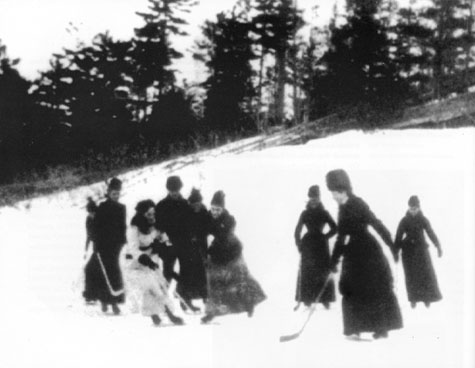
Women playing ice hockey in Canada between 1888 and 1893

Few women competed in sports in Europe and North America before the late nineteenth and early twentieth centuries. Although women were technically permitted to participate in many sports, relatively few did. Those who did participate often faced disapproval. Early women's professional sports leagues during the early part of the 20th century foundered. These women's "sports" were more focused on fitness, beauty, weight, and health. There are also records of exhibitions, focused on the novelty of seeing a woman excel in a "male" field or inviting women to watch a "masculine" activity in a male-dominated venue (such as Frances Anderson's billiards exhibitions in early 20th century).

Women's sports in the late 1800s focused on correct posture, facial and bodily beauty, muscles, and health. Before 1870, activities for women were recreational rather than sport-specific and emphasized physical activity rather than competition. Sports for women before the 20th century placed more emphasis on fitness rather than the competitive aspects we now associate with organized sports.

In 1916 the Amateur Athletic Union (AAU) held its first national championship for women (in swimming), In 1923 the AAU also sponsored the First American Track & Field championships for women. Earlier that year the Women's Amateur Athletic Association (WAAA) held the first WAAA Championships.

Bicycling became a popular activity among women in the suffragette era. "Bicycling has done more to emancipate women than anything else in the world," Susan B. Anthony said. "I stand and rejoice every time I see a woman ride on a wheel. It gives women a feeling of freedom and self-reliance."

==== The Olympics and women ====
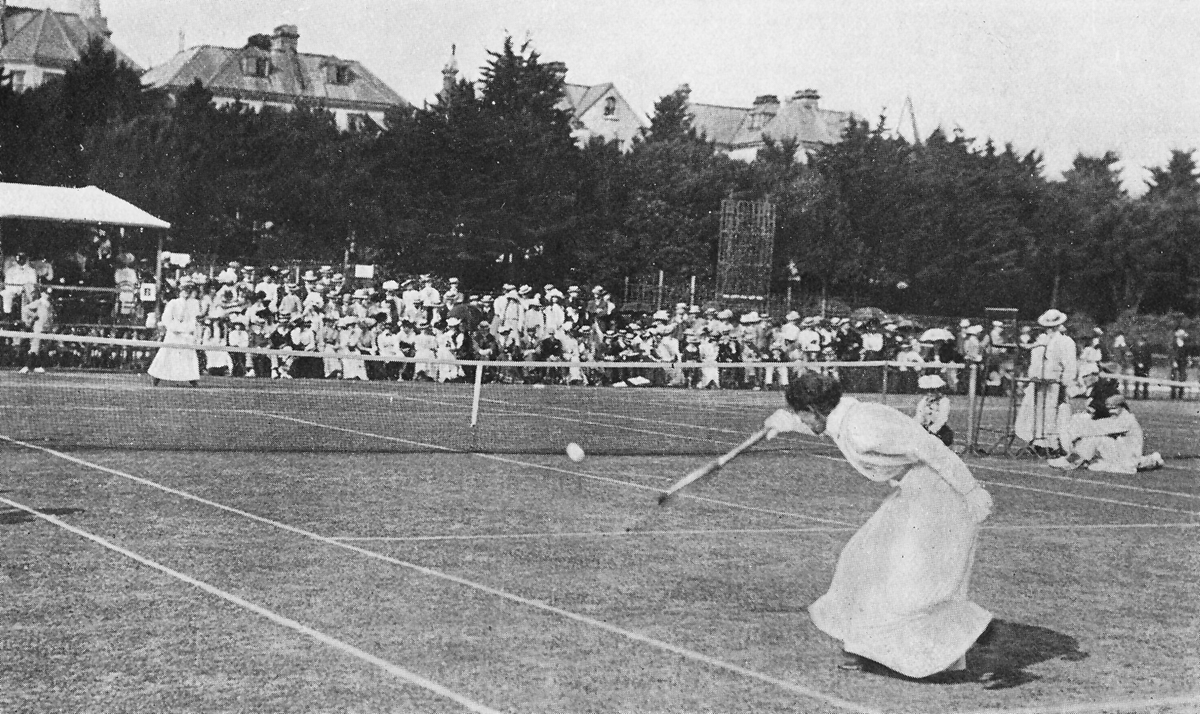
Charlotte Cooper Sterry, the first female Olympic tennis champion as well as the first individual female Olympic champion

The first Olympic games in the modern era in 1896 were not open to women. Since then the number of women who have participated in the Olympic games have increased substantially. Many girls and women had lots of opportunities to join the Olympics.

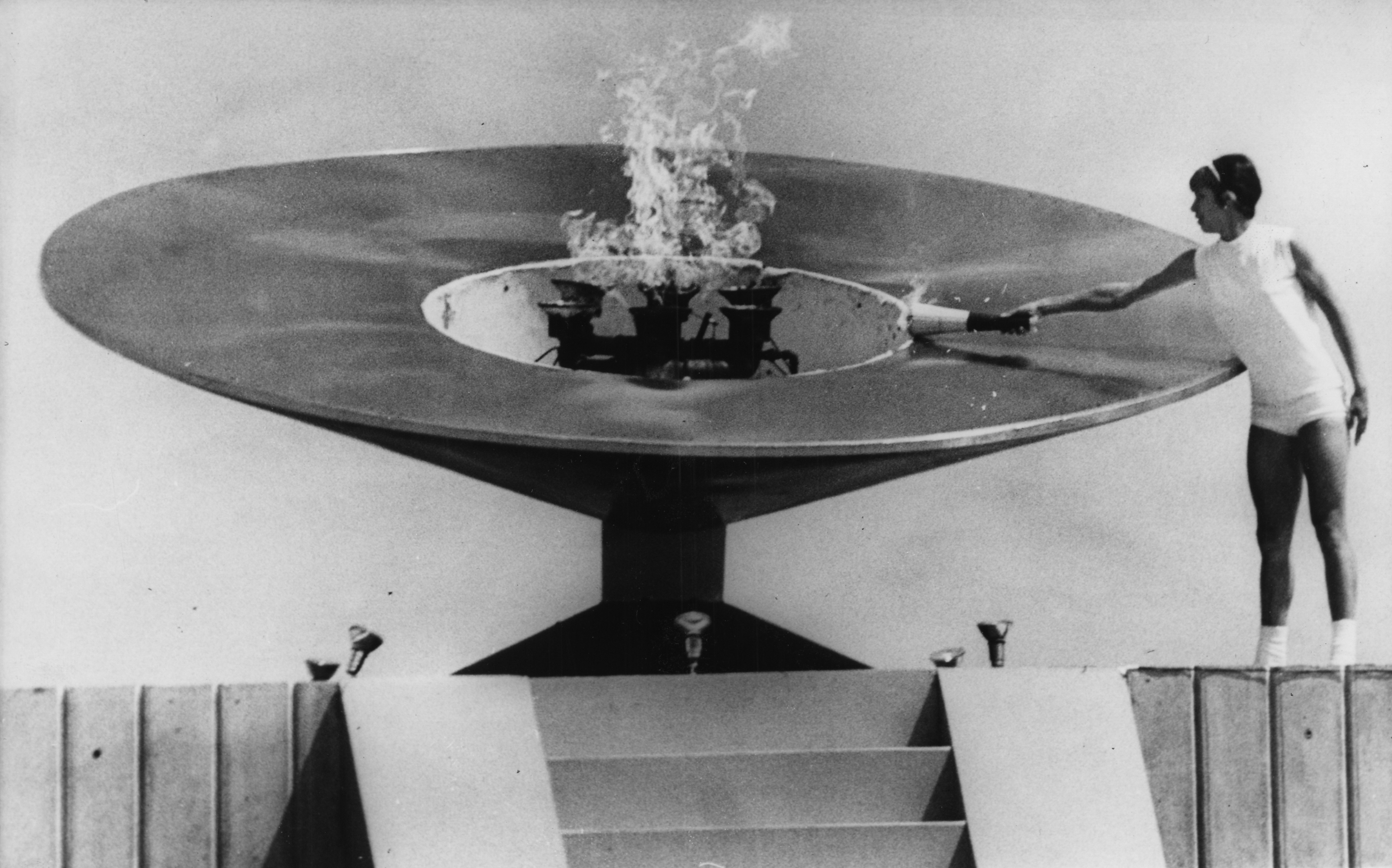
Enriqueta Basilio carrying the Olympic torch and lighting the cauldron. Becoming the first woman in the entire Olympic history in having done so.

The modern Olympics had female competitors from 1900 onward, though women at first participated in considerably fewer events than men. Women first made their appearance in the Olympic Games in Paris in 1900. That year, 22 women competed in tennis, sailing, croquet, equestrian, and golf. The International Olympic Committee founder Pierre de Coubertin described women's sports "impractical, uninteresting, unaesthetic, and we are not afraid to add: incorrect". However, the 6th IOC Congress in Paris 1914 decided that a woman's medal had formally the same weight as a man's in the official medal table. This left the decisions about women's participation to the individual international sports federations. Concern over the physical strength and stamina of women led to the discouragement of female participation in more physically strenuous sports.

In response to the lack of support for women's international sport the Fédération Sportive Féminine Internationale was founded in France by Alice Milliat. This organization initiated the Women's Olympiad (held 1921, 1922 and 1923) and the Women's World Games, which attracted participation of nearly 20 countries and was held four times (1922, 1926, 1930 and 1934). In 1924 the 1924 Women's Olympiad was held at Stamford Bridge in London. The International Olympic Committee began to incorporate greater participation of women at the Olympics in response. The number of Olympic women athletes increased over five-fold in the period, going from 65 at the 1920 Summer Olympics to 331 at the 1936 Summer Olympics.

Amateur competitions became the primary venue for women's sports. Throughout the mid-twentieth century, Communist countries dominated many Olympic sports, including women's sports, due to state-sponsored athletic programs that were technically regarded as amateur. The legacy of these programs endured, as former Communist countries continue to produce many of the top female athletes. Germany and Scandinavia also developed strong women's athletic programs in this period.

Women's sports in history

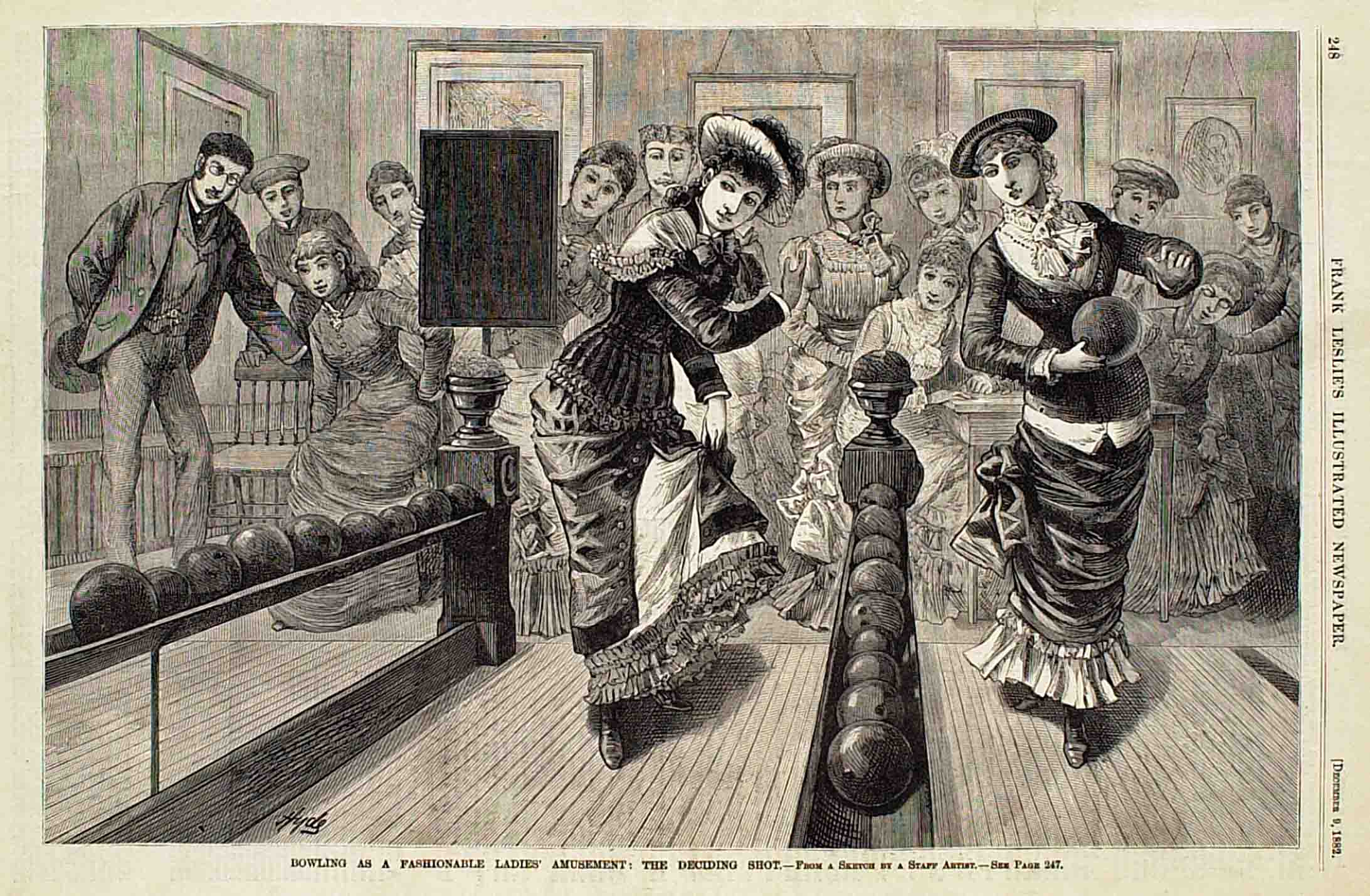
Women bowling—called a "fashionable ladies amusement"—in 1882

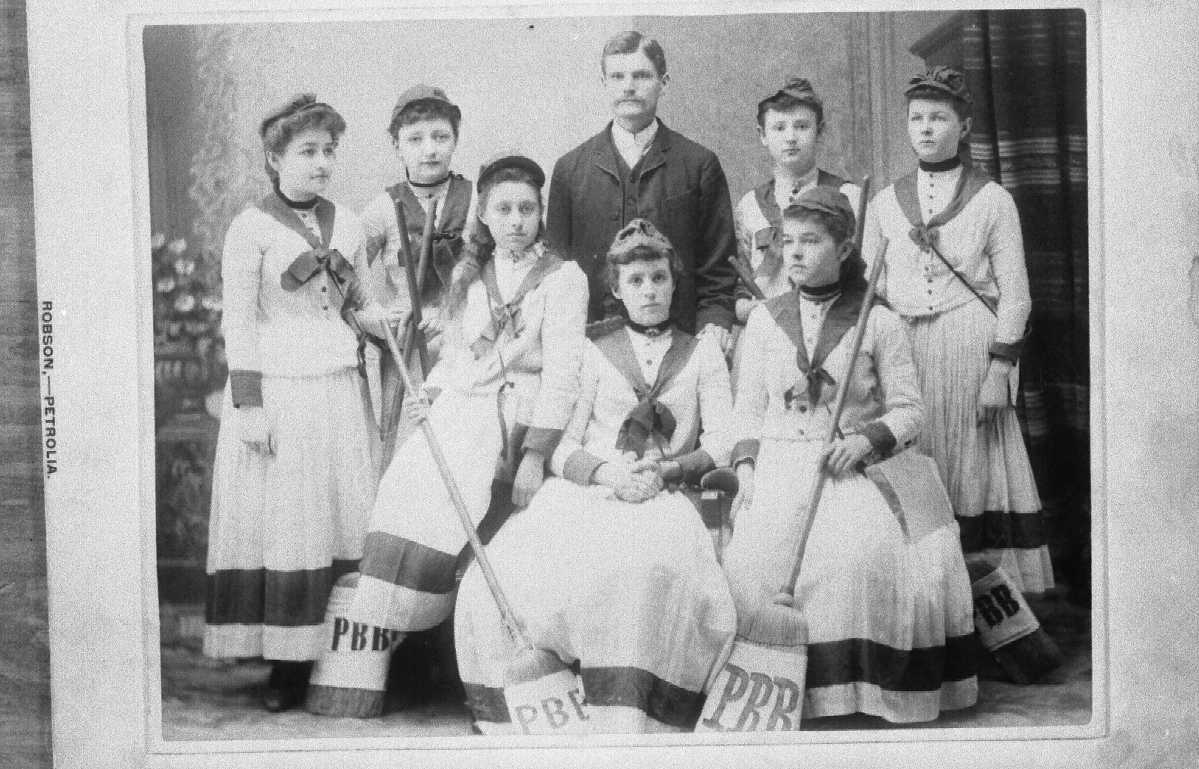
Early 1900s: Girls broomball team in Canada

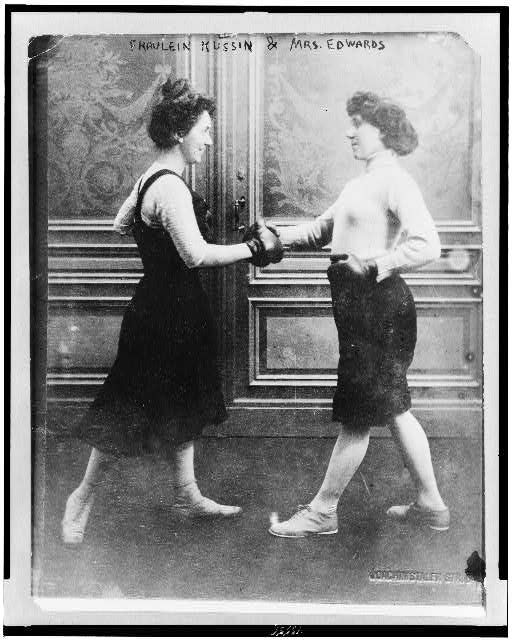
1912: Fraulein Kussinn and Mrs. Edwards boxing

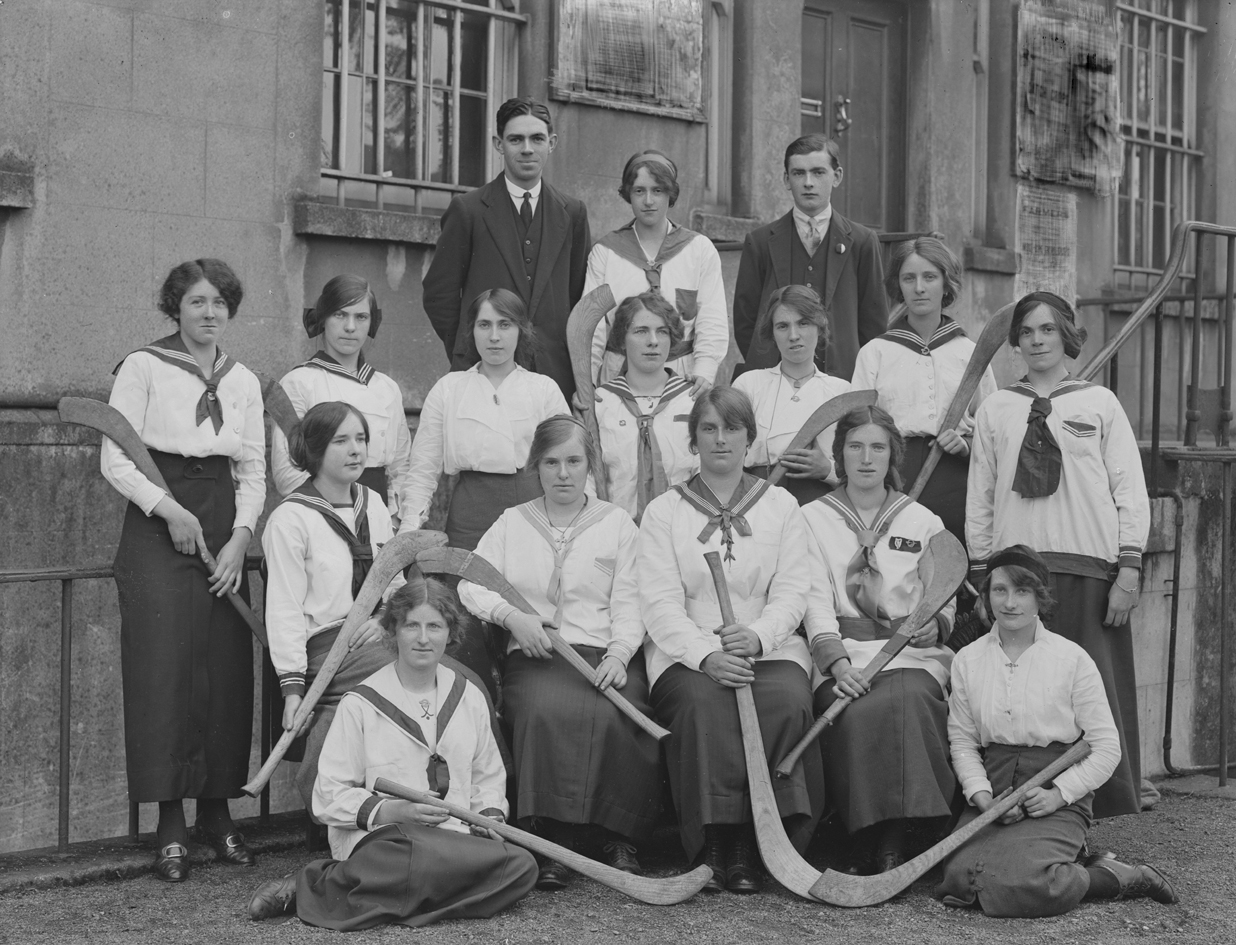
1915: Camogie team in Ireland posing with their hurleys/camáns

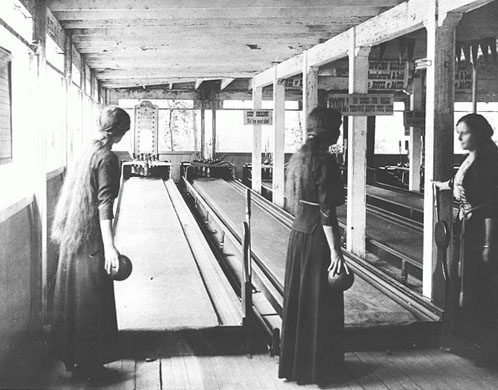
Women bowling in formal attire, probably ca. 1915.

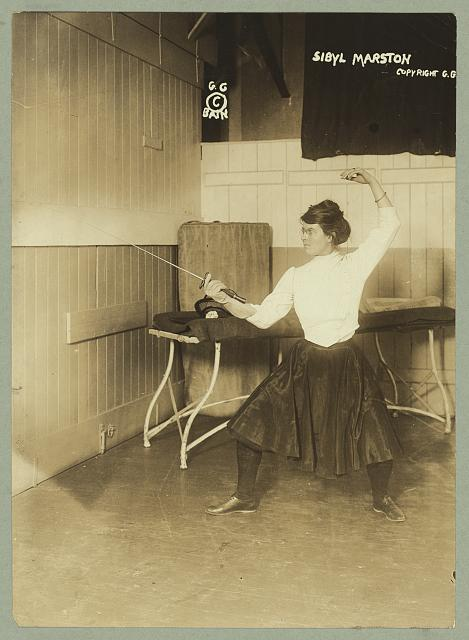
C. 1915: fencer Sibyl Marston holding a foil

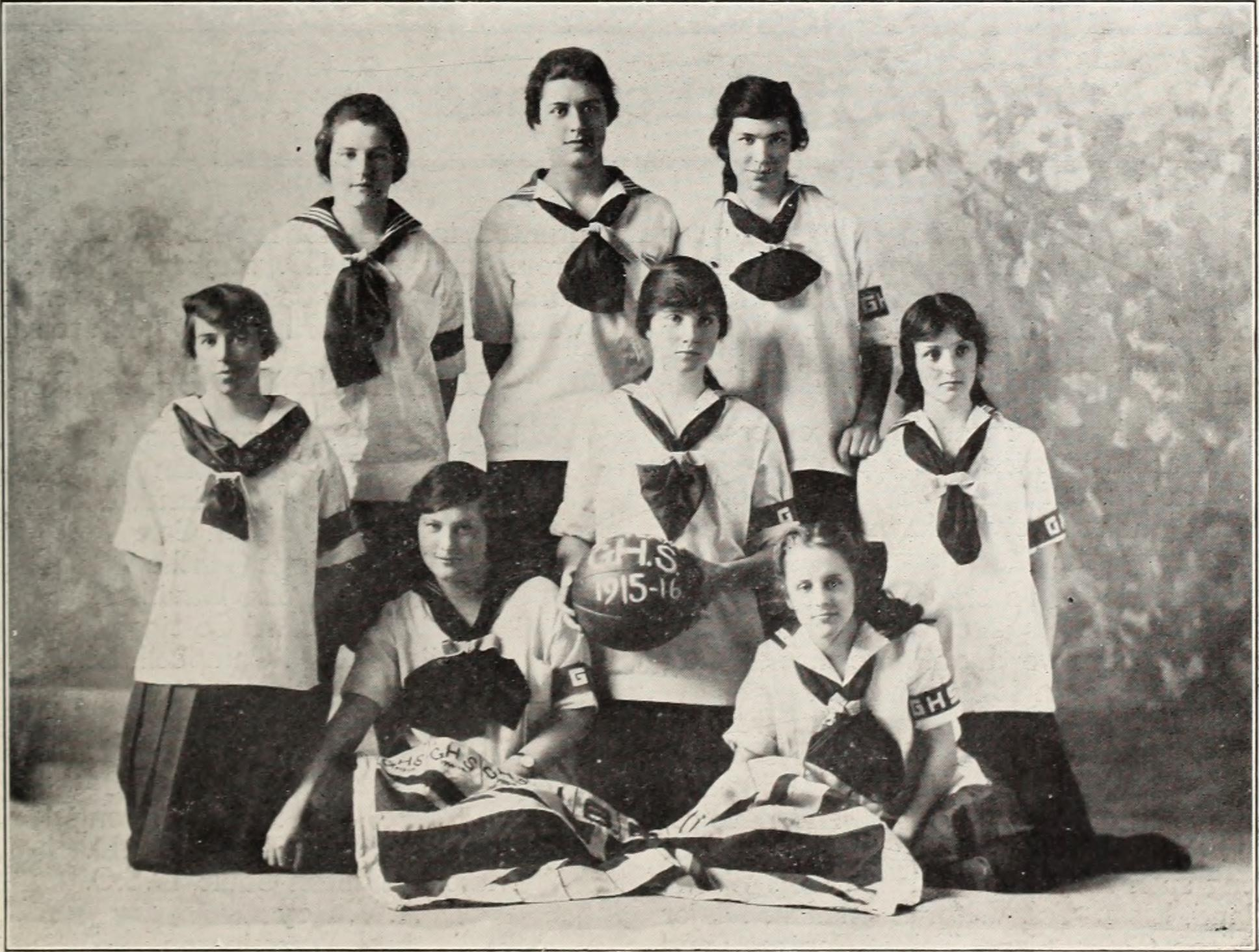
1915–1916: Girls Junior basketball team in Canada

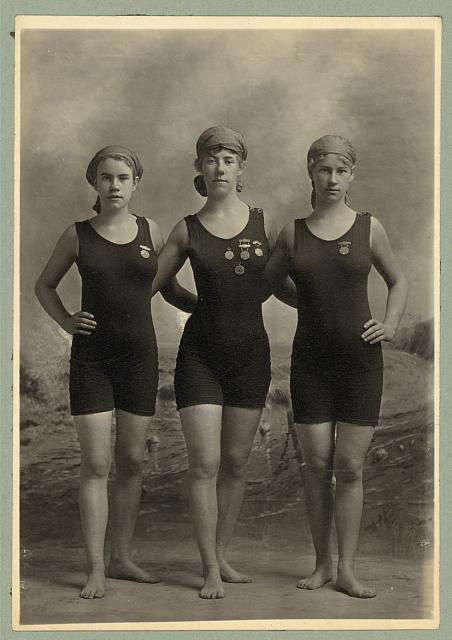
c. 1920: young women wearing swimming competition medals

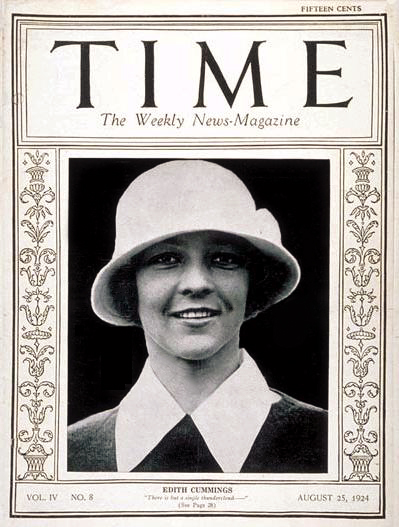
1924: Edith Cummings was the first woman athlete to appear on the cover of Time magazine, a major step in women's athletic history

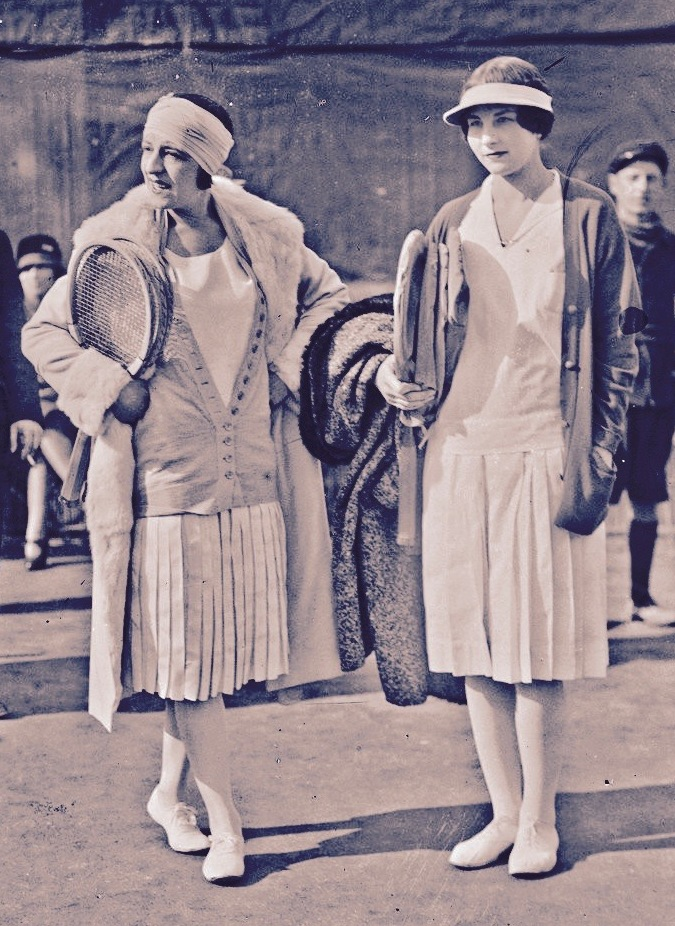
1926: tennis players Suzanne Lenglen and Helen Wills during the Match of the Century

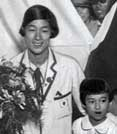
Kinue Hitomi, first Japanese woman to win an Olympic medal in 1928.

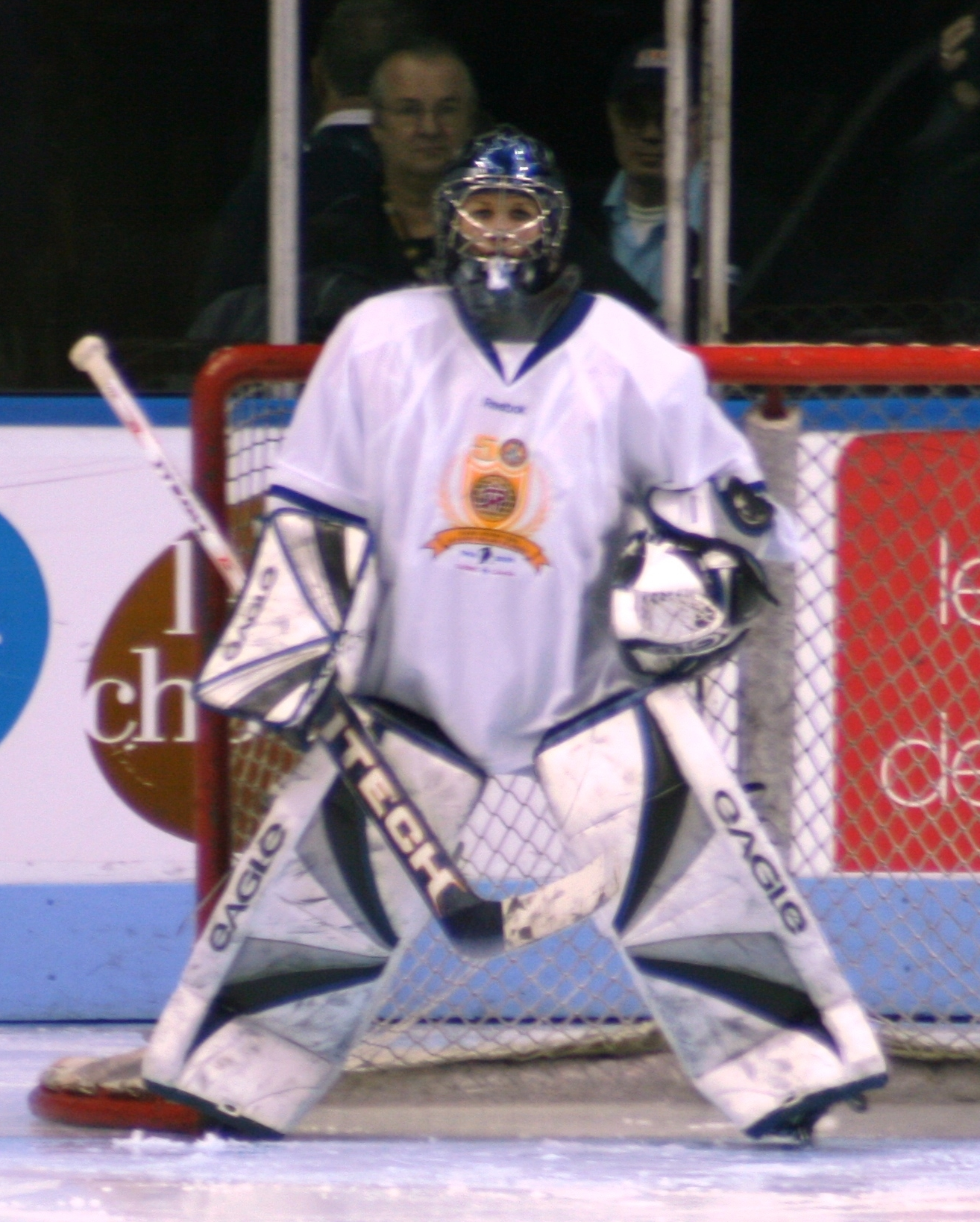
Manon Rhéaume, ice hockey goalie, first woman to play in a men's North American pro league

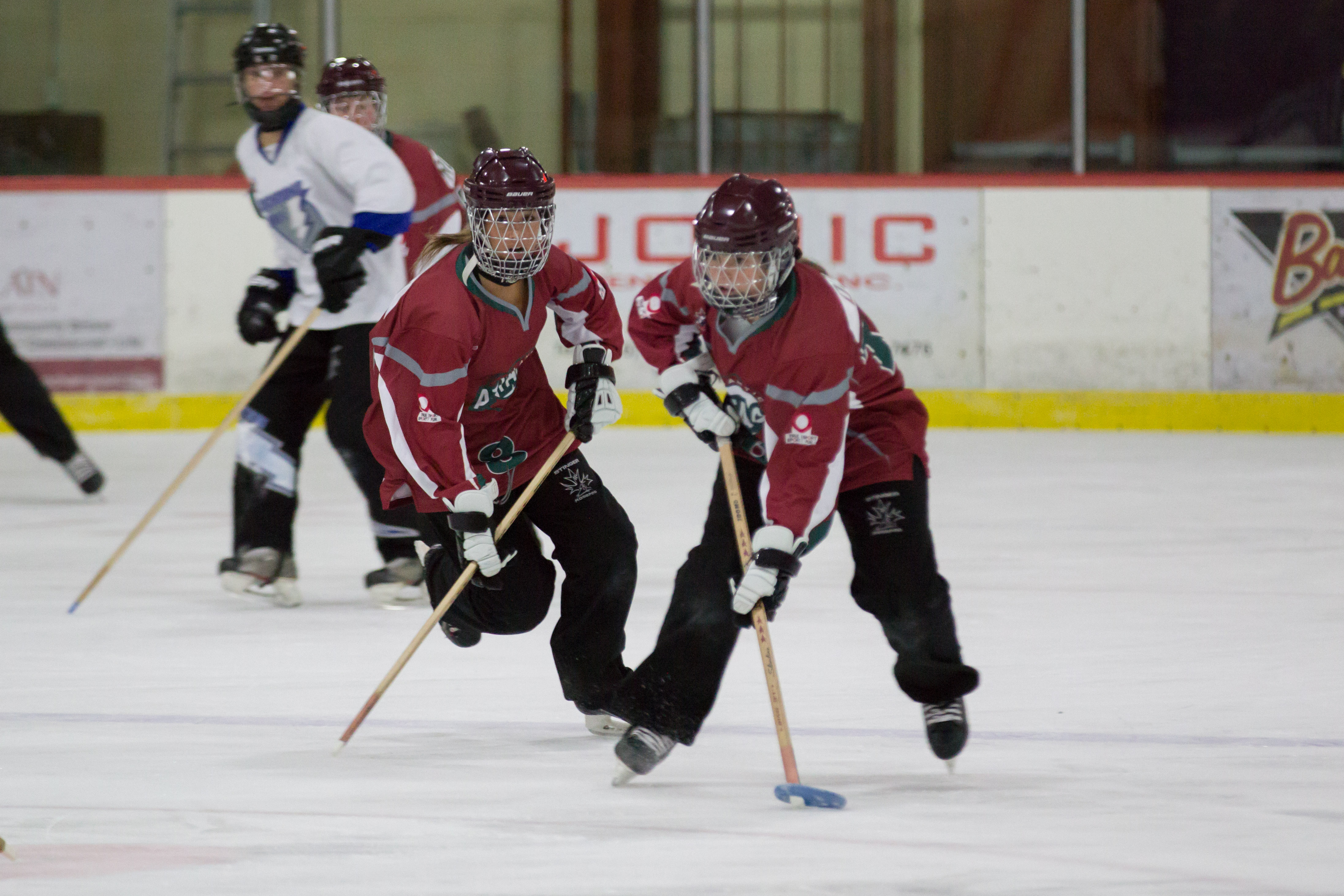
National Ringette League, first winter team sports league in North America where elite players are exclusively female

== United States ==
Women have steadily received more opportunities to participate in sports in the United States over the centuries, with Title IX having played a major role since 1972 in ensuring sex-equal opportunity. Today there are a number of professional women's sport leagues in the United States.

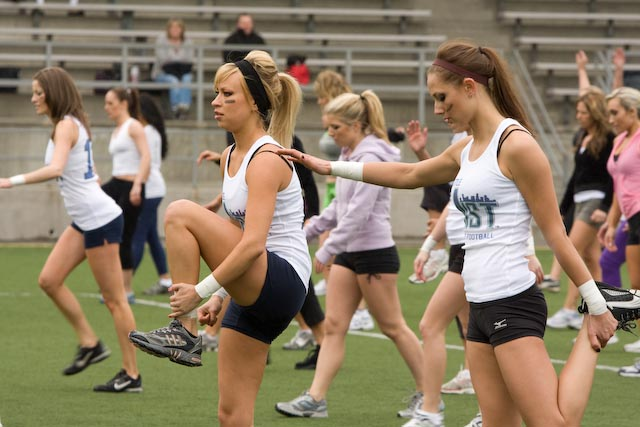
Some players of the X League doing a warming up exercise

In 1972 the United States Congress passed the Title IX legislation as a part of the additional Amendment Act to the 1964 Civil Rights Act. Title IX states that: "no person shall on the basis of sex, be excluded from participating in, be denied benefits of, or be subjected to discrimination under any educational programs or activities receiving federal financial assistance"; Title IX prohibits discrimination based on sex in schools receiving federal funds through grants, scholarships, or other support for students. The law states that federal funds can be withdrawn from a school engaging in intentional sex-based discrimination in the provision of curriculum, counseling, academic support, or general educational opportunities.

Contrary to popular belief, Title IX initially had nothing to do with sports and would not include interscholastic or varsity sports until later. Today the law from the Education Act requires that both male and female athletes have equal facilities and equal benefits. The equal benefits are considered necessities such as equal equipment, uniforms, supplies, training, practice, quality in coaches and opponents, awards, cheerleaders and bands at the game.

A stadium screen depicting the Dallas Cowboys Cheerleaders

In 1975, the Department of Health, Education, and Welfare's Office for Civil Rights (OCR) published a Title IX regulation that required institutions sponsoring athletic programs to provide equal athletic opportunities for students by accommodating both sexes' athletic interests and abilities.

1. Providing athletic participation opportunities that are substantially proportionate to the student enrollment. This prong of the test is satisfied when participation opportunities for women and men are "substantially proportionate" to their respective undergraduate enrollment.
2. Demonstrating a continual expansion of athletic opportunities for the underrepresented sex. This prong of the test is satisfied when an institution has a history and continuing practice of program expansion that is responsive to the developing interests and abilities of the underrepresented sex (typically female).
3. Accommodating the interest and ability of the underrepresented sex. This prong of the test is satisfied when an institution is meeting the interests and abilities of its female students even where there are disproportionately fewer females than males participating in sports.

==== Compliance standards ====
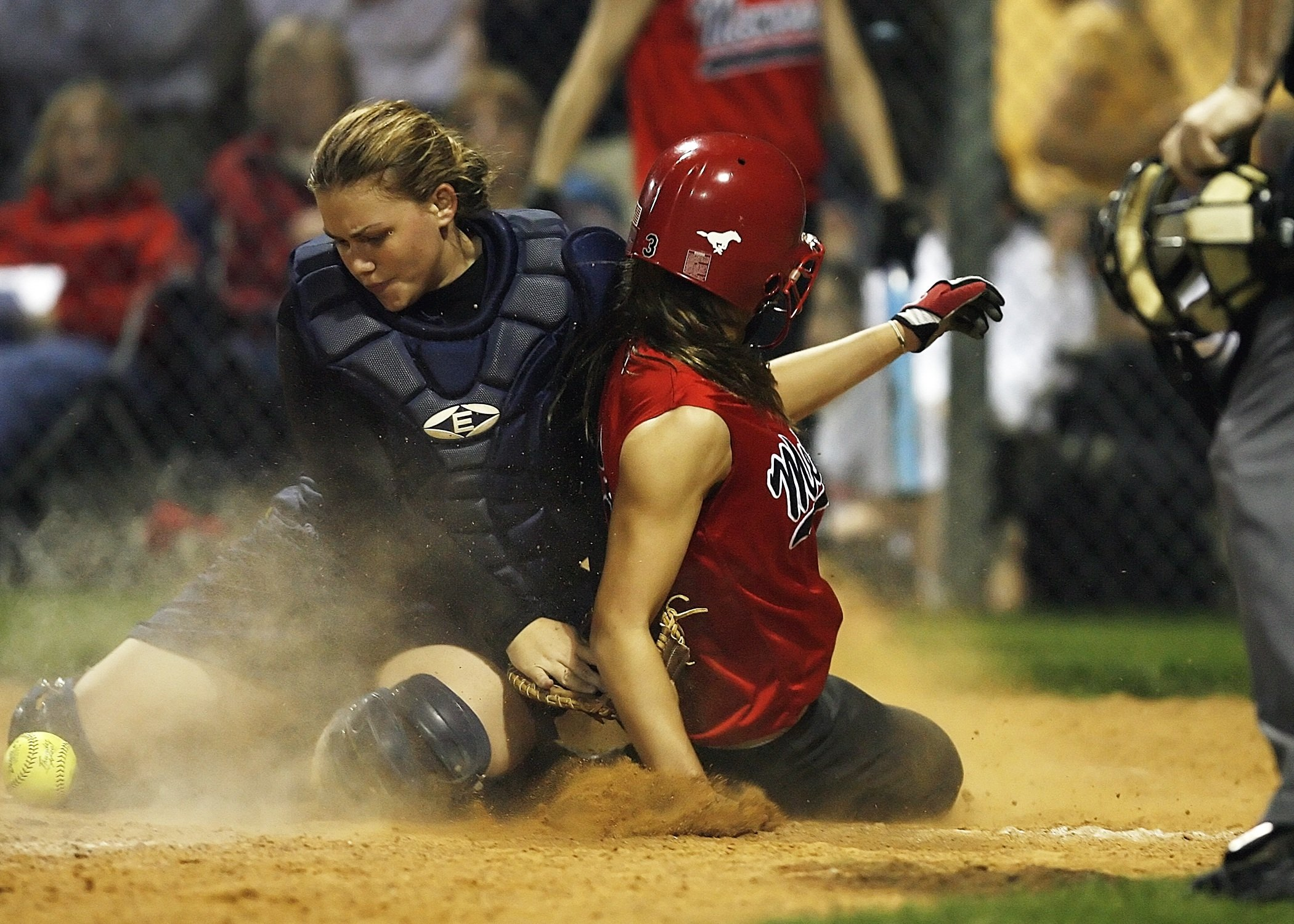
Softball home plate collision

==== Effect of Title IX on women's sports ====
Though women have been pro athletes in the United States since the early 1900s, paid teams and leagues are still uncommon and, as of 2013, female athletes are paid far less than their male counterparts. For instance, the WNBA had its first season in 1997, 51 years after the inception of the men's NBA. The WNBA (under the NBA Board of Governors) pays the top women's players less than 1% of the salary that the top men's players are capable of earning; in 2021, the maximum salary for any WNBA player was $221,450, while the maximum NBA salary was $38,199,000. In 2005, the WNBA team salary cap was $0.673 million; by 2021, this amount had nearly doubled to $1.339 million. However, during this period, the NBA's cap more than doubled, from $43.87 million in 2005 to $109.14 million in 2021.

The Women's United Soccer Association became the first American women's pro league in 2001, but lasted only briefly because of financial sponsorship. Fans enjoyed women's pro soccer for three seasons before executives announced the suspension of the league, despite the women's national soccer team (USWNT) rating it as one of the world's top teams. The absence of a Women's professional football (soccer) league in the United States made it difficult for the USWNT to find new players until Women's Professional Soccer was founded. A 2004 effort to revive the WUSA was launched. On September 4, 2007, a new North American women's professional football league, tentatively named Women's Soccer LLC, was announced, and ultimately launched in 2009 as Women's Professional Soccer. That league folded after its 2012 season, with the current National Women's Soccer League established later that year and beginning play in 2013.

== Canada ==
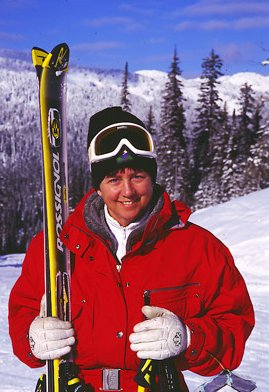
Nancy Greene Alpine skiing

Organized sports hold a high priority status in Canadian culture. The growth of female participation in sport in Canada has historically been slower than that among males. One notable exception is the female sport of ringette, which is not a variant of a popular men's sport and whose players are predominantly female. Different arguments exist as to why there are less female participants in sport in Canada and what factors are and should be considered most relevant.

=== Academic prejudice ===
In most cases, Canadian studies involving female participation in sport fail to involve methodologies that account for and make observable the difference between participation rates in exclusively or predominantly female sports such as artistic (née synchronized) swimming and ringette in comparison to sports involving male and female categories of the same sport, such as basketball.

=== Canadian feminists in sport ===
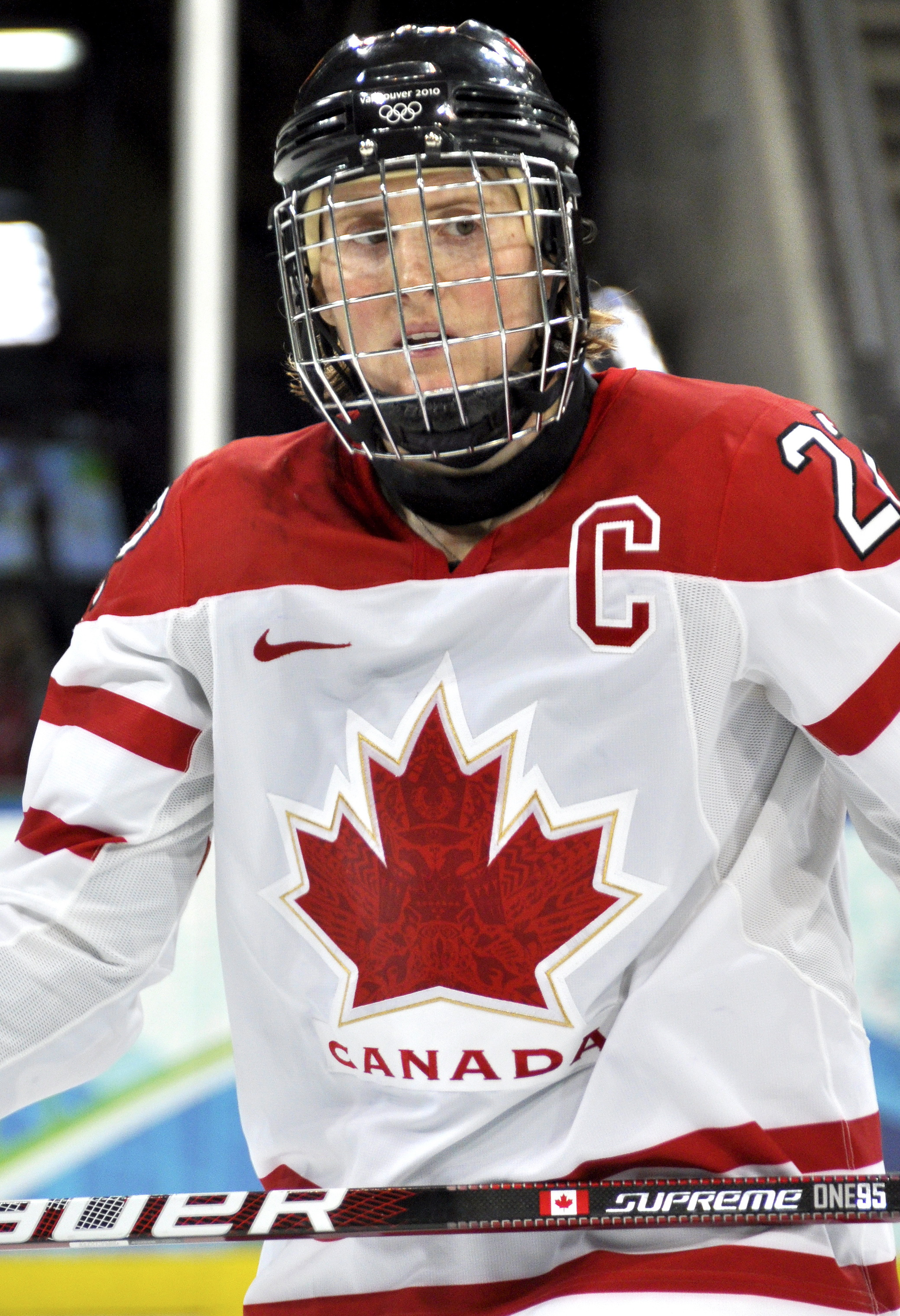
Hayley Wickenheiser captained Canada to a gold medal at the 2010 Winter Olympics.

In Canada, the majority of feminist ideologues in sport claim slow growth in participation in girls' and women's sports programs (with male and female categories) are due to a number of factors. While both girls and women have historically had low levels of interest and participation, sports feminists in Canada have contended that these differences are largely due to patriarchy and the fact that there are fewer women than men in leadership positions in academic administration, student affairs, athletics, and coaching.

In Canada as well as in other societies worldwide, organized sports have been used and viewed as a traditional way to demonstrate and develop masculinity. With an increasing number of girls and women with a serious interest in sports, the cross-cultural divide between the sexes began to narrow with the male sports establishment becoming actively hostile. During the 1960s with the arrival of second wave feminism, a number of feminists dismissed female sports and thought of them as an unworthy cause and one in no need of their support.

Among other feminists, women's progress in sport involved the belief that their needed to be an effort to counter a common and unfounded notion that vigorous physical activity was dangerous for women. These notions where first challenged around 1900. These women, called, "new women", started with bicycling. By the 1920s, a marked change for women occurred involving young working-class women in addition to the pioneering middle class sportswomen. However, more recent scientific research in the sport sciences, particularly sports medicine have shown differences between women and men in terms of types of sports injuries, their rate of occurrence, and injury recovery times. Female athletes participating in contact and combat sports are an area of particular concern, especially in the case of concussions. Concern also involves consequences to women during pregnancy.

=== Differences in codes ===
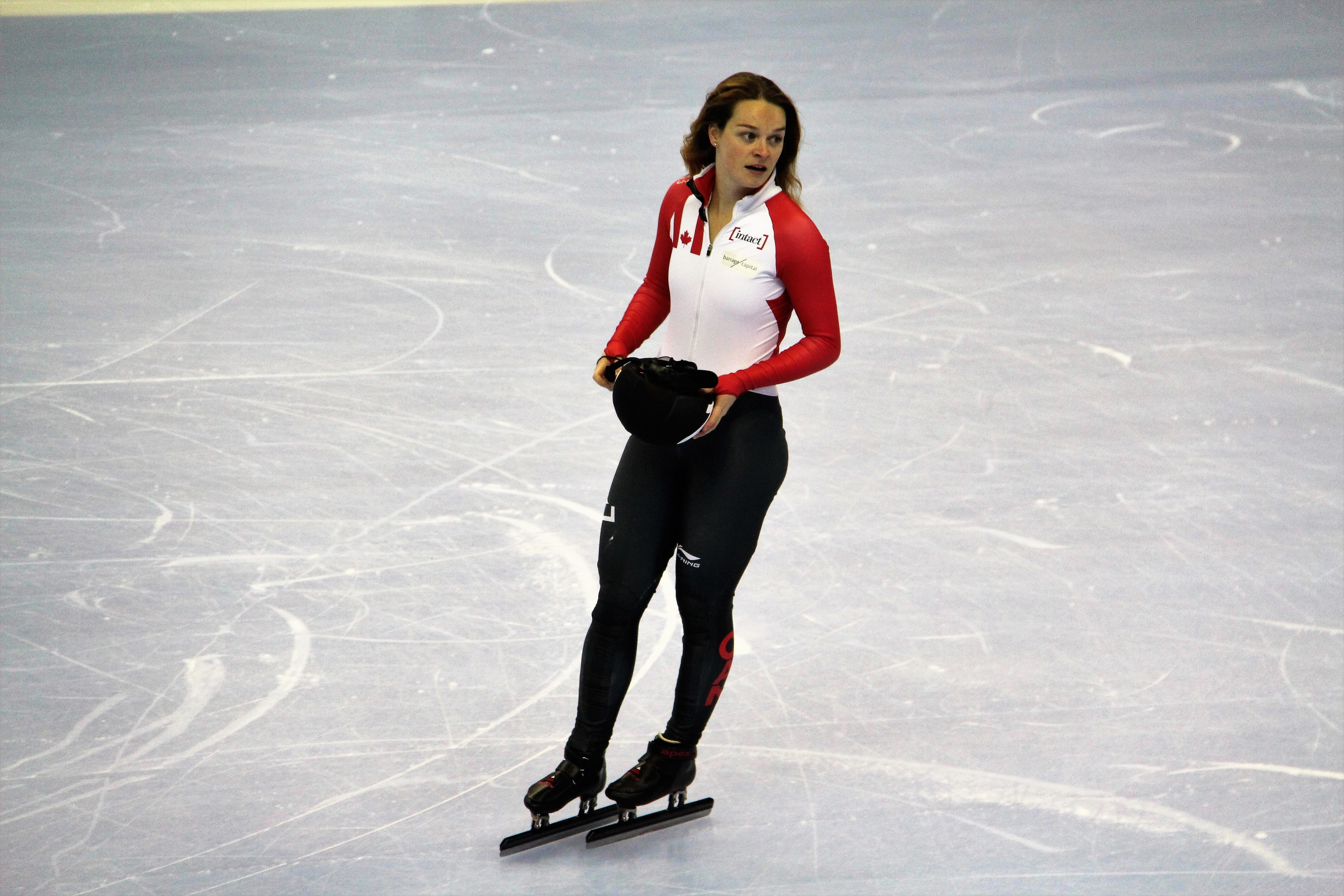
Kim Boutin a Canadian short track speed skater.

Historically, regional differences in Canada are recorded to have existed in regards to codified rules in sport involving male and female programs. One such example involves the Eastern provinces of Canada which for a time included a different game code for the female category of basketball, while the Western provinces opted for a simplified identical rules structure in relation to both sexes. This disparity is claimed as evidence of sexism among the more radical feminist polemicists in Canadian sport.

=== First elite all-female winter team sports league ===
Canada is home to the first elite all-female winter team sports league in North America, the National Ringette League (NRL). The league was established for the sport of ringette in Canada in 2004. The league recruits the best ringette talent in North America, largely from Canada, but some players originate from Finland or the United States. The league's players are unpaid as the league is not a professional one and acts as a showcase league instead.

Ringette was created exclusively for females in Canada in 1963 and excluded male athletes. As a result, the elite level of the sport consists entirely of players who are women. Because the sport has developed a female category, and a male category does not exist, the league has no opportunity to form a partnership with a male league counterpart. However, it does not have to compete with the men's sports leagues themselves, unlike Canadian women's soccer's Northern Super League (NSL) which must contend with the men's Major League Soccer (MLS) & Canadian Premier League (CPL), the Women's National Basketball Association (WNBA) which must contend with the men's National Basketball Association (NBA) or the North American women's Professional Women's Hockey League (PWHL) which must contend with the men's National Hockey League (NHL).

== Germany ==
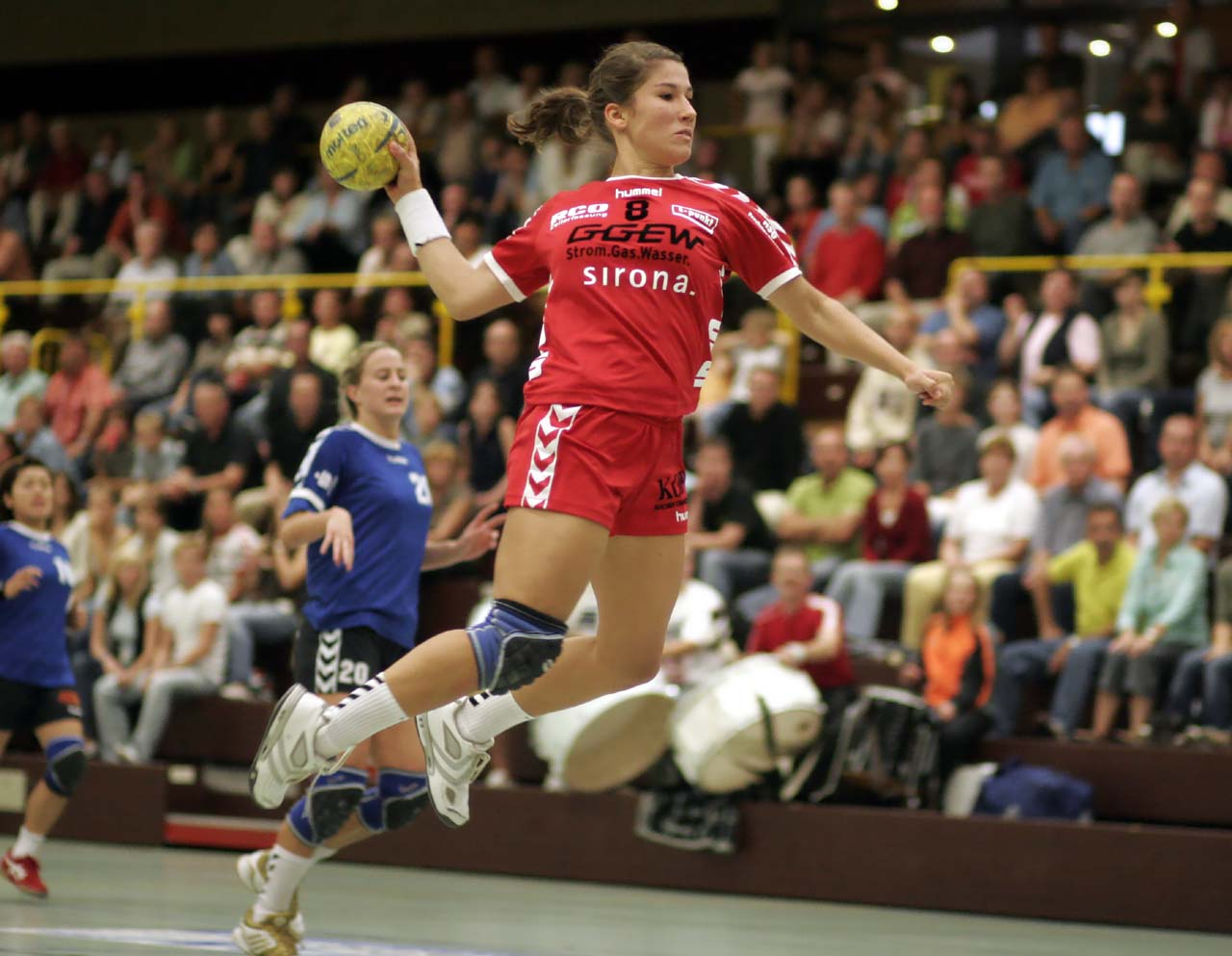
German handball player Mara Friton in 2006

Female athletic dominance grew during the Weimar period in Germany with several factors contributing to this new era. Many opportunities made it possible for women to join sports programs and push boundaries within society. These included the enrollment of women in German universities, the rise in female employment, as well as involvement in war industries. All of these are examples of economic changes due to World War I. Women's fashion reflected the changes that women perceived in themselves. Women's magazines showed them in sporting outfits as they were motivated to create an appearance that featured them as healthy and fit. The same women were known at night in more fashionable outfits, displaying femininity. Women were becoming more competitive in sport. The competitive sports that women began participating in, included swimming, ski-jumping, and soccer. Participation in masculine sports including boxing and weightlifting, drew the attention of the press. The growing participation of women in sport also sparked a rise in satirical exaggerations of women that downplayed their role in the athletic world. Pictures of women in sporting attire were produced with the intention of publicizing a negative image of their bodies as a consequence of their participation in sport. As issues surrounding women's sexuality began to grow in the public sphere, women also gained more publicity and attention in relationship to their place in sports.

== United Kingdom ==
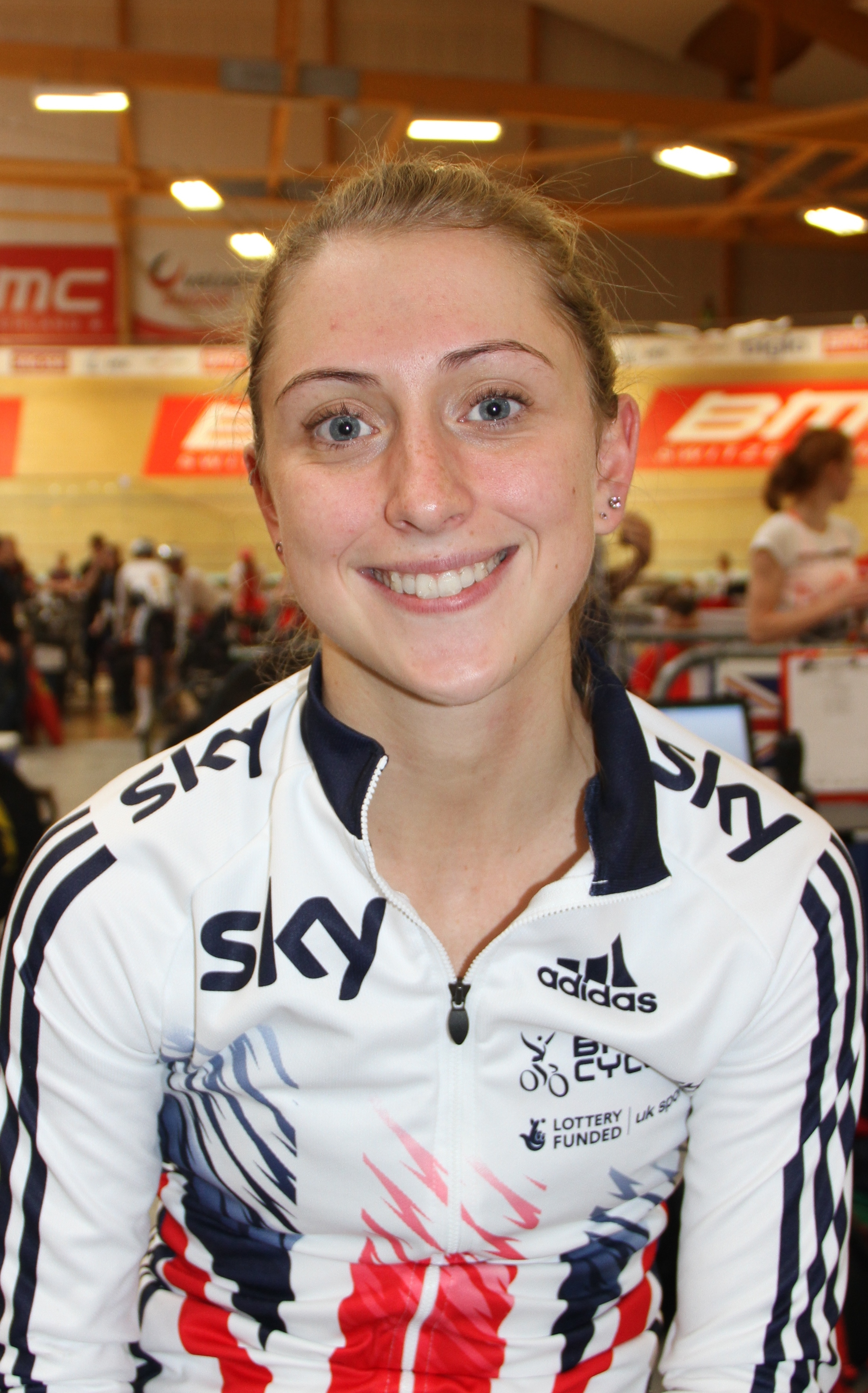
Laura Kenny has the most gold medals of any female British Olympian, with five.

The United Kingdom has produced a range of major international sports including: association football, rugby (union and league), cricket, netball, darts, golf, tennis, table tennis, badminton, squash, bowls, rounders, modern rowing, field hockey, boxing, snooker, billiards, and curling. In the 19th century, women primarily participated in the "new games" which included golf, lawn tennis, cycling, and field hockey. Now, women also participate at a professional/international level in soccer, rugby, cricket, and netball.

Since the late 1980s, Women in Sport, a non-profit organization based in London, has hoped to transform sport for the benefit of women and girls in the UK.

The Henley Royal Regatta, more recently allowed women to compete at this prestigious rowing race. Although the benefits that men receive at this race versus what women receive is still drastically different, there is progress within allowing women to compete competitively.

=== 1800s to present ===
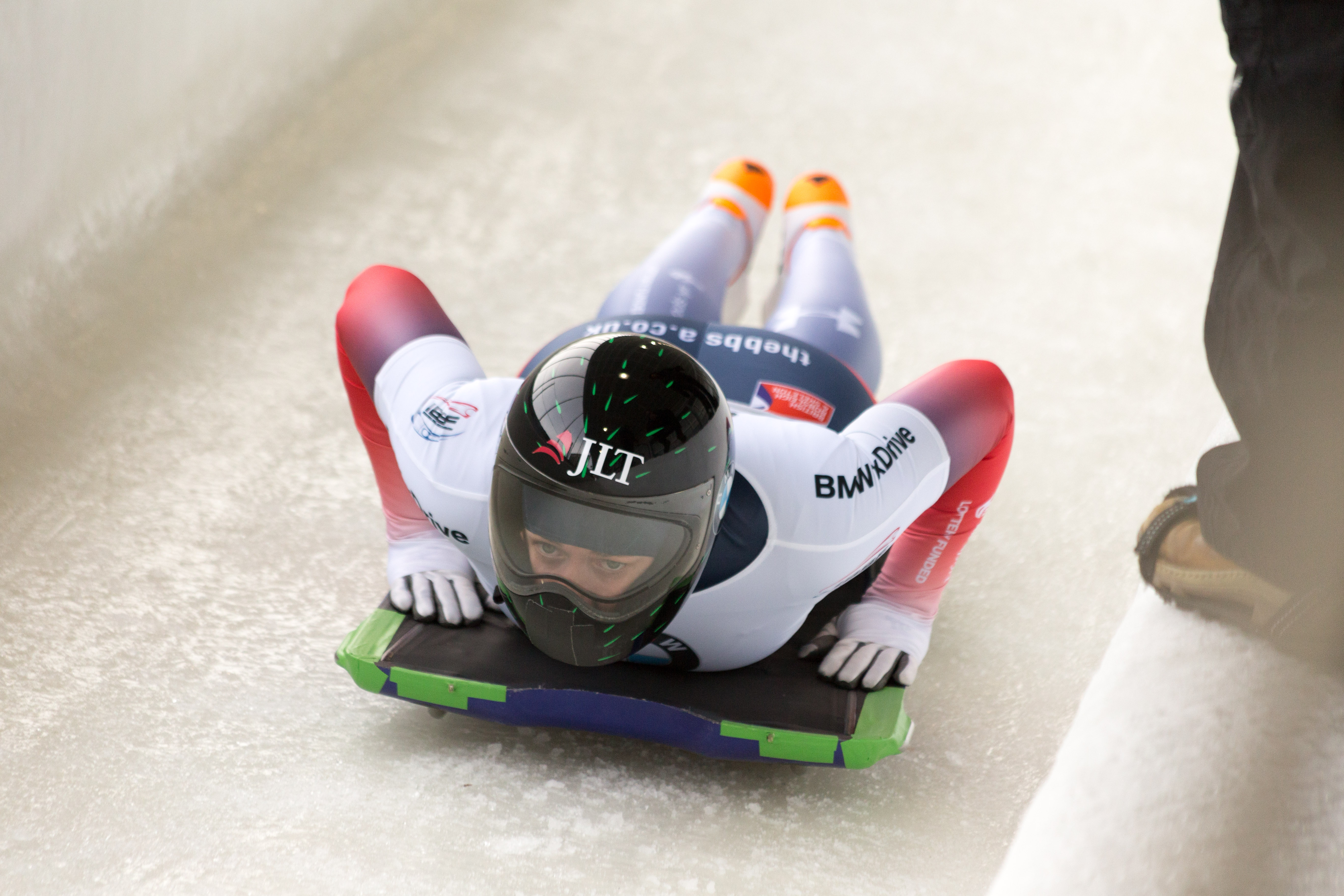
Lizzy Yarnold, 2017, Lake Placid

In the early 1800s women romped, skated, played ball games and some even boxed. The early half of the 1900s saw an increase in interest in regards to the development of physical education programs for public schools for both sexes as well as developing public recreation programming and facilities (a.k.a. parks and recreation) which became a new emerging field.

By 1920 women's football had become extremely popular, largely due to the suspension of men's football due to war efforts. Matches were held with large numbers of spectators, with the Boxing Day match at St Helens in 1920 reaching 53,000 fans-an attendance record that would not be beaten until Team GB beat Brazil at Wembley during the London 2012 Olympics 92 years later.

One year later, the Football Association voted to ban women's game from FA-Affiliated grounds for 51 years. The FA's Consultative Committee's ruling stated:

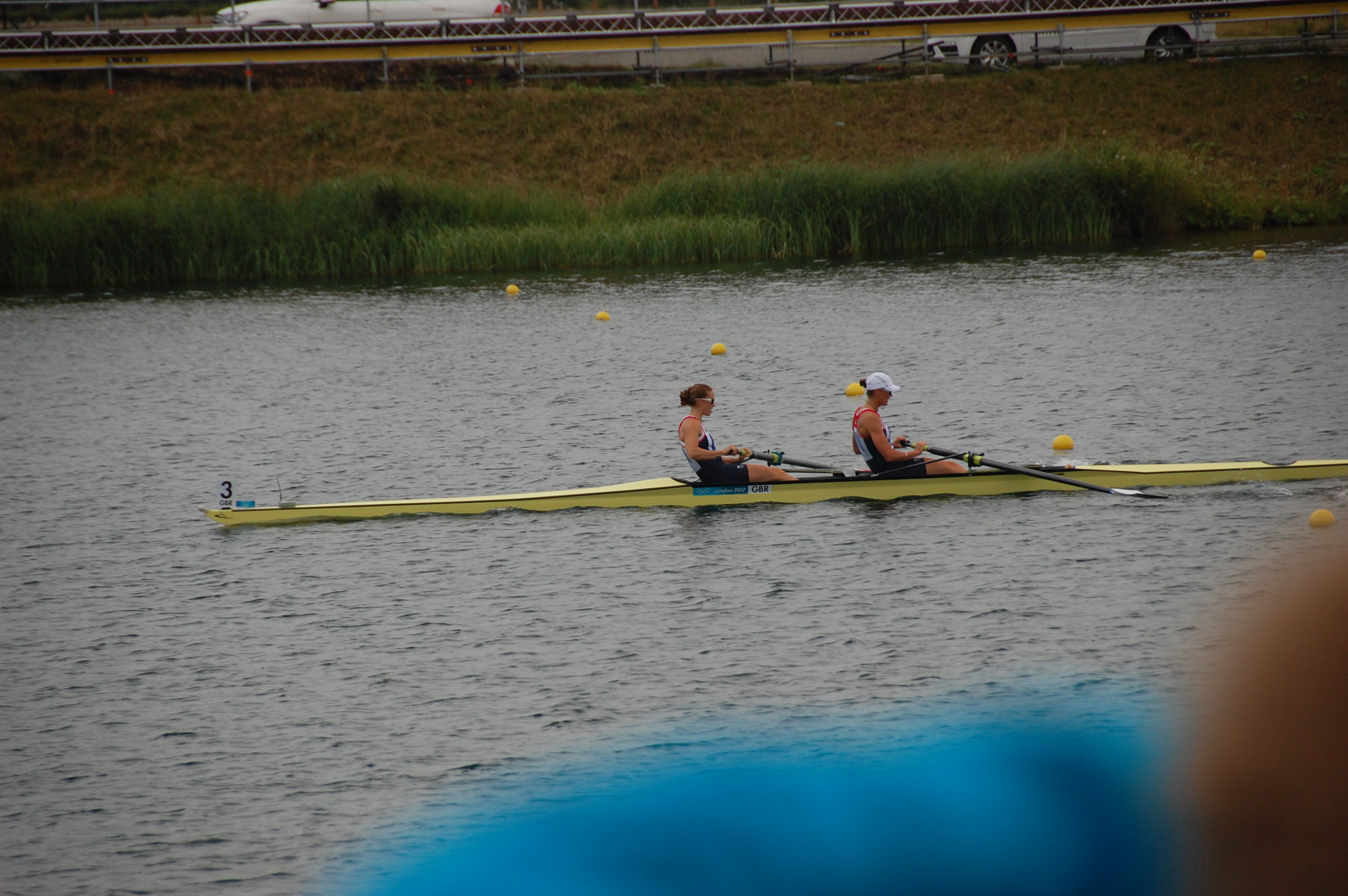
Helen Glover and Heather Stanning at Dorney Lake during the 2012 Summer Olympics

"Complaints having been made as to football being played by women, Council felt impelled to express the strong opinion that the game of football is quite unsuitable for females and should not be encouraged. Complaints have also been made as to the conditions under which some of the matches have been arranged and played, and the appropriation of receipts to other than charitable objects. The Council are further of the opinion that an excessive proportion of the receipts are absorbed in expenses and an inadequate percentage devoted to charitable objects. For these reasons the Council requests the Clubs belonging to the Association refuse the use of their grounds for such matches."

Beginning in the 1970s, women's tennis grew as a popular professional sport and provided the occasion for a symbolic "battle of the sexes" between Billie Jean King and Bobby Riggs, which King won. The contest was strictly for show after Riggs bragged he would win, despite his age and lack of fitness. Nevertheless, the competition gained media popular media exposure thus enhancing the profile of female athletics.

The later success of Serena and Venus Williams helped raise the profile of women's tennis again, but faced hostility once in the media spotlight. They were critiqued for their personal upbringings, their muscular builds, and the clothes they wore. James McKay and Helen Johnson described them as "Ghetto Cinderellas".

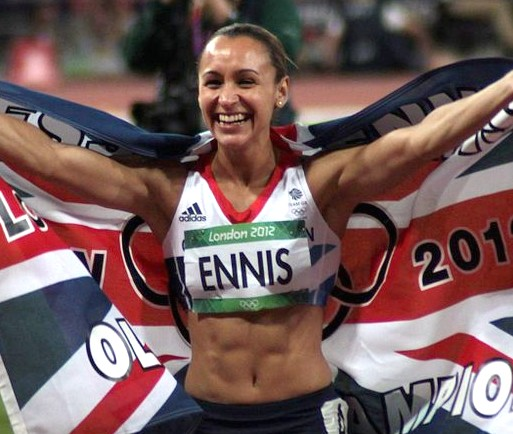
Jessica Ennis at the Olympics

Women's professional team sports began to achieve prominence in the 1990s, particularly in basketball and football (soccer). The WNBA was formed and the first Women's World Cups and women's Olympic soccer matches were held.

In 1999, at the 1999 FIFA Women's World Cup Final in Pasadena, California, after scoring the fifth kick in the penalty shootout to give the United States the win over China in the final game, Brandi Chastain celebrated by spontaneously taking off her jersey and falling to her knees in a sports bra. While removing a jersey in celebration of a goal was common in men's soccer, it was highly unusual in women's football at the international level. The image of her celebration has been considered one of the more famous and controversial photographs of a woman celebrating an athletic victory. In 2019, it was announced that a statue of Chastain's celebration would be displayed at the Rose Bowl to commemorate the twenty-year anniversary of the team's win.

Girls' participation in more violent contact sports is far less than their male counterparts. In such sports, boys overwhelmingly outnumber girls, particularly American football, wrestling, and boxing.

Leagues for girls do exist in such sports, such as the Utah Girls Football League and Professional Girl Wrestling Association. Katie Hnida became the first woman ever to score points in a Division I NCAA American football game when she kicked two extra points for the University of New Mexico in 2003. In 2023, Haley Van Voorhis became the first woman to play a non-kicking position in NCAA football, playing as a safety for Division III Shenandoah.

Heather Watson and Fu Yuanhui were considered to have challenged a taboo in women's sport when both openly admitted they were menstruating, Watson after a self-described poor performance in a tennis match in 2015, and Fu at the Olympics in Rio de Janeiro.

== Female sports ==
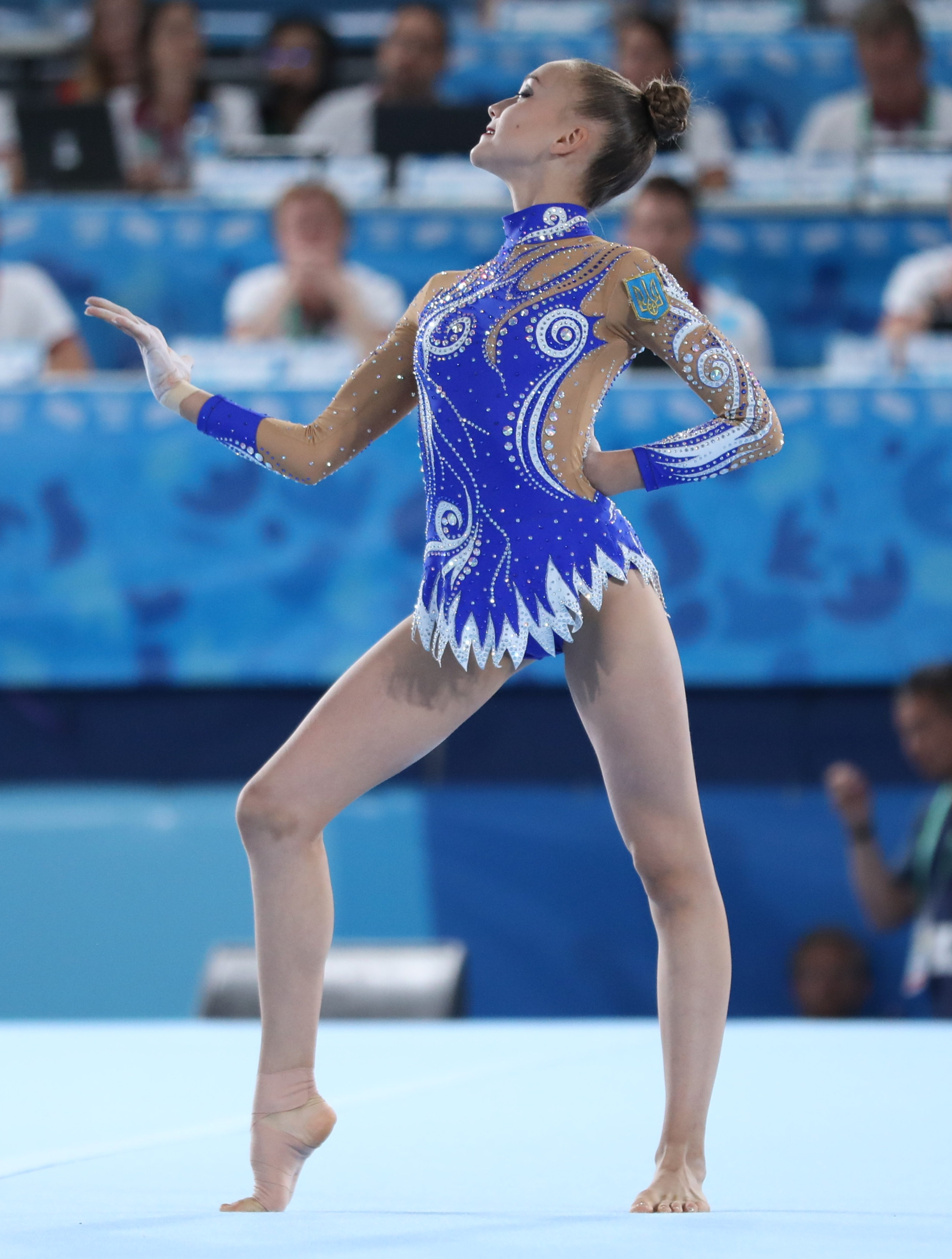
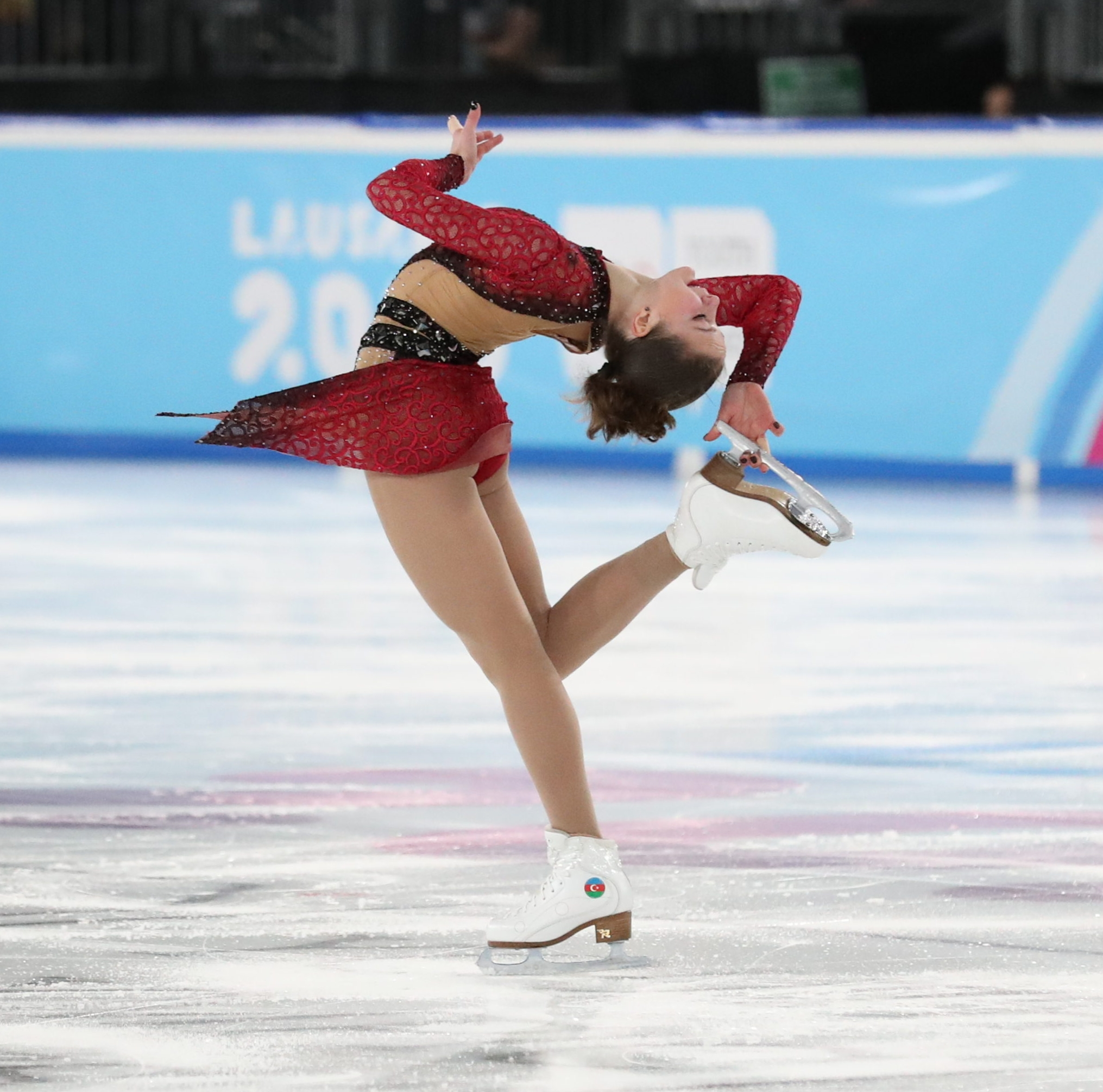
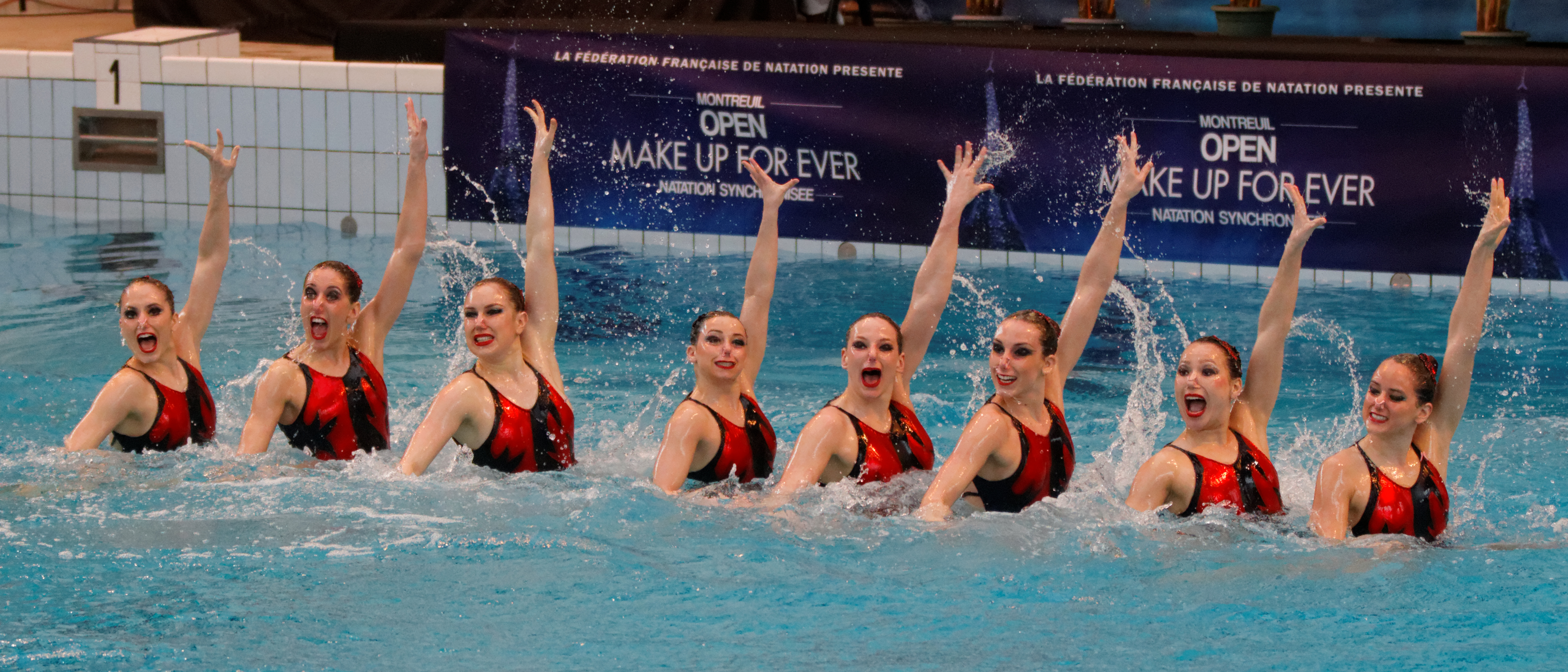
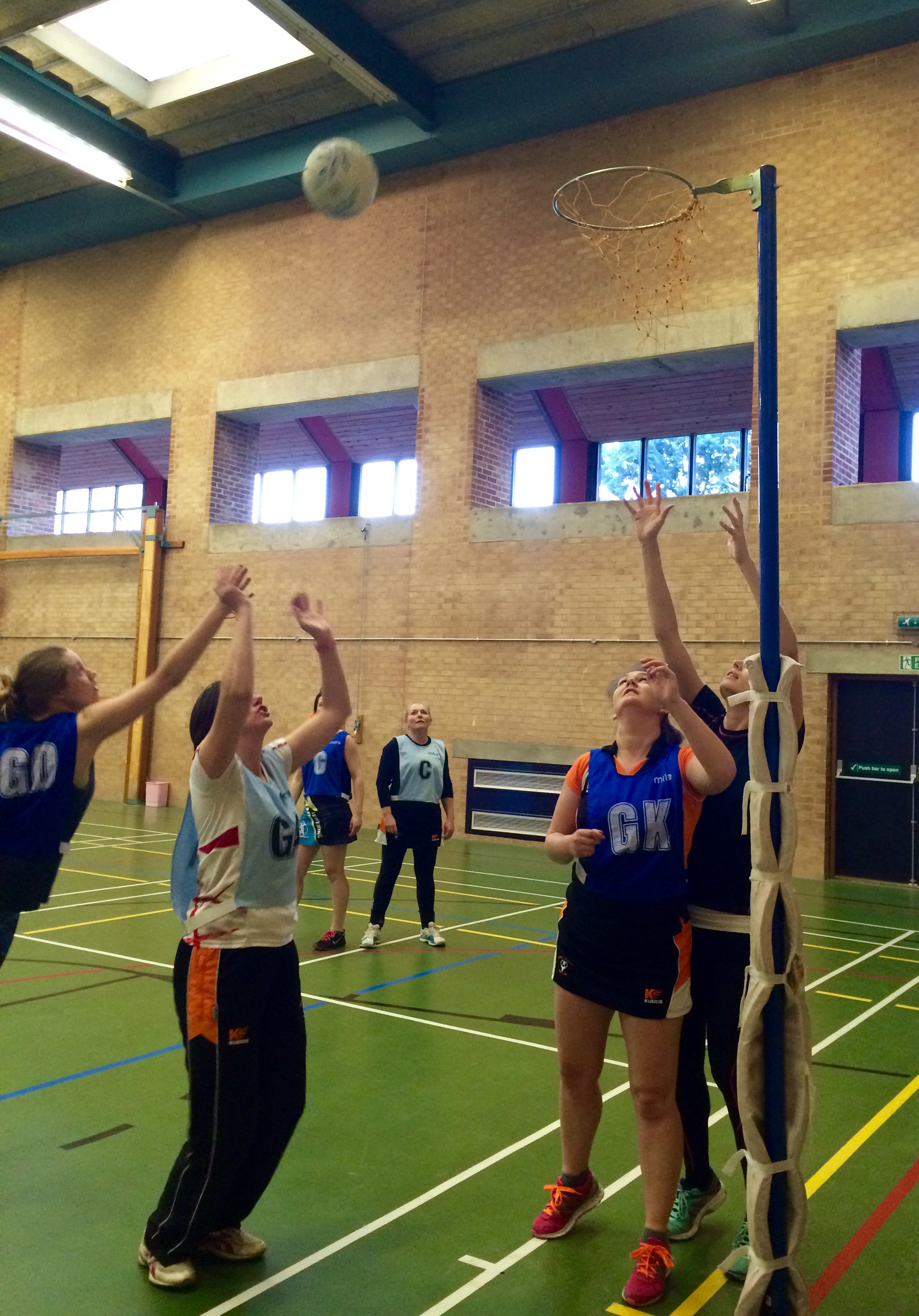
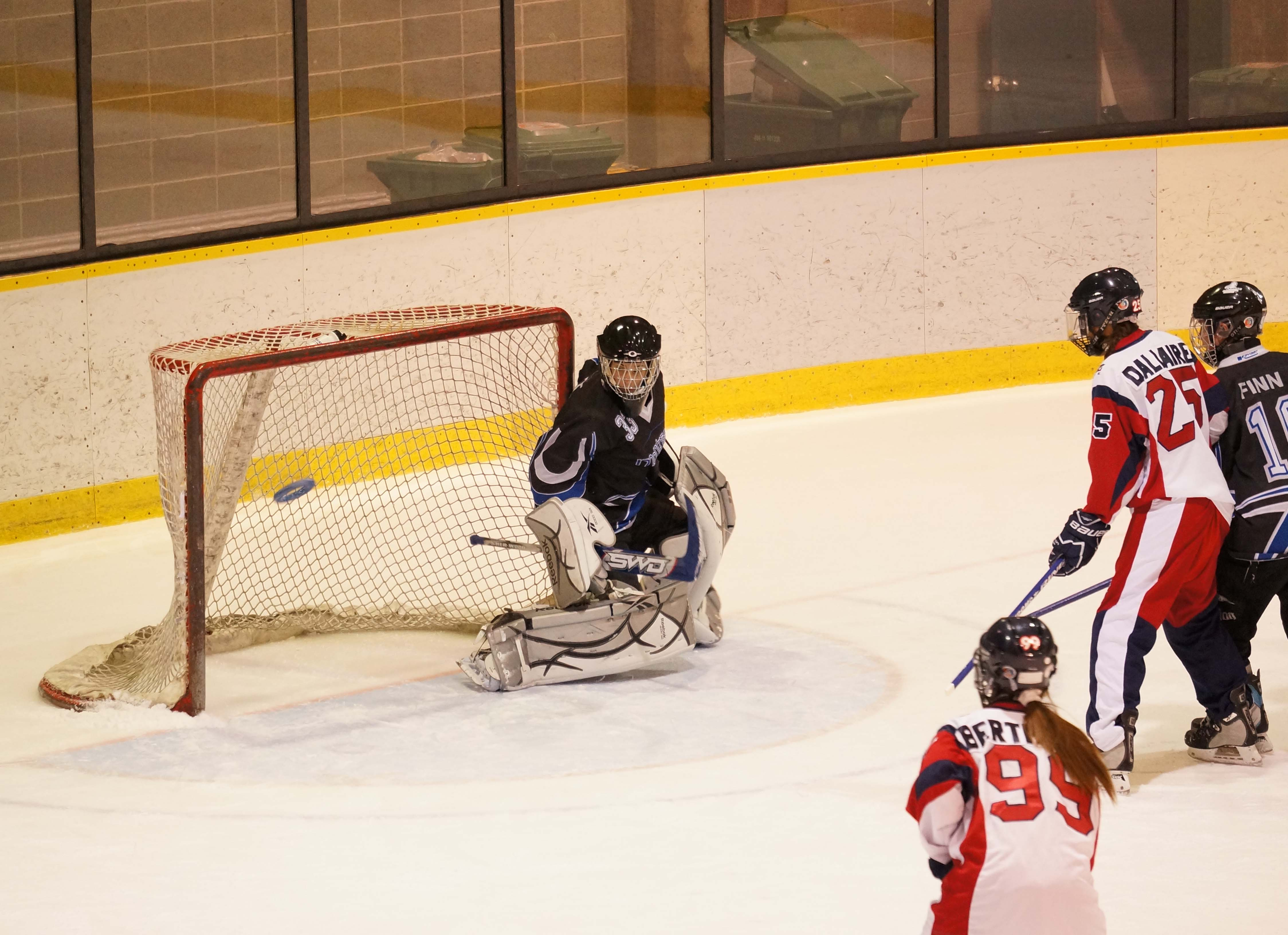
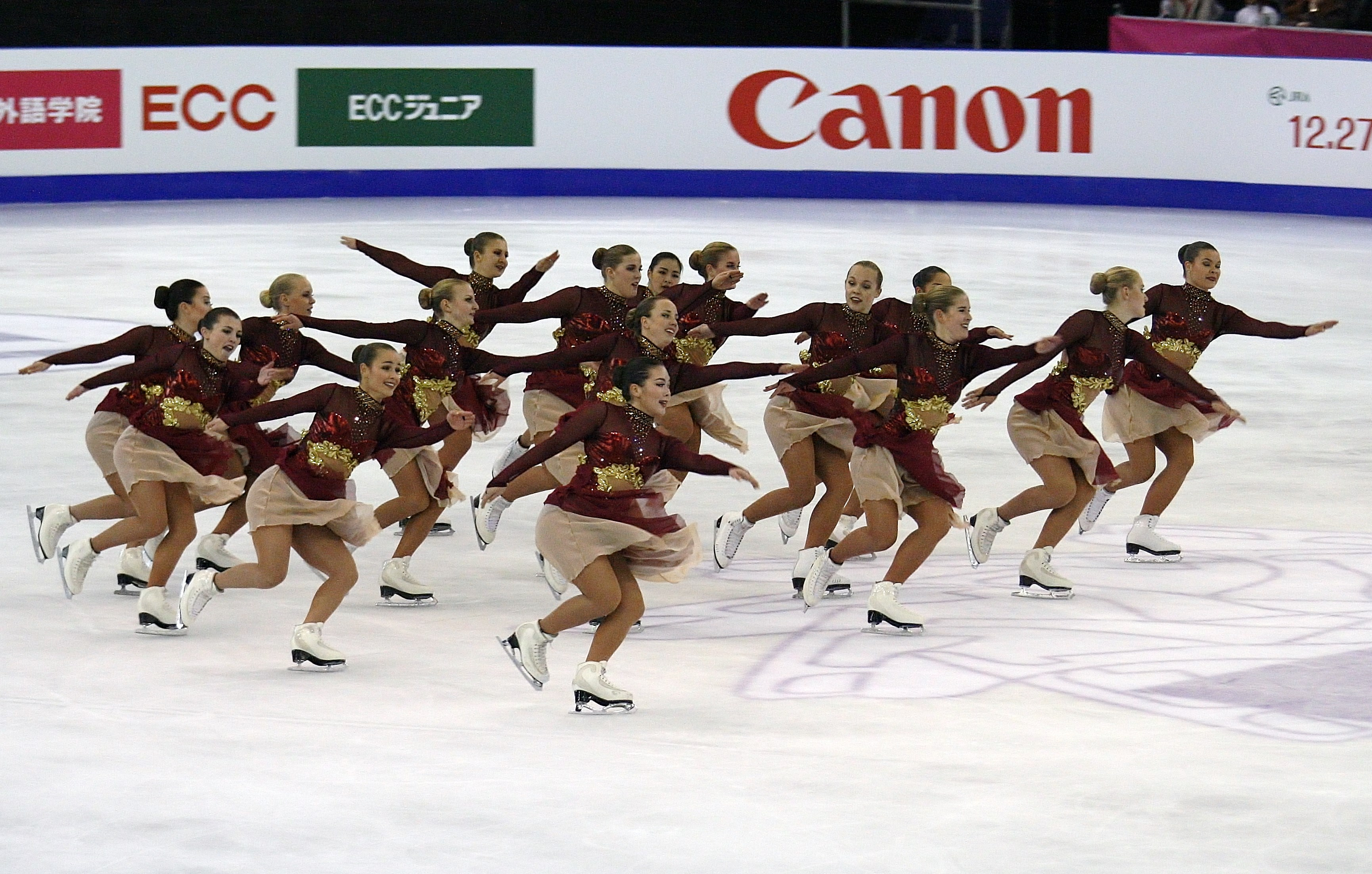
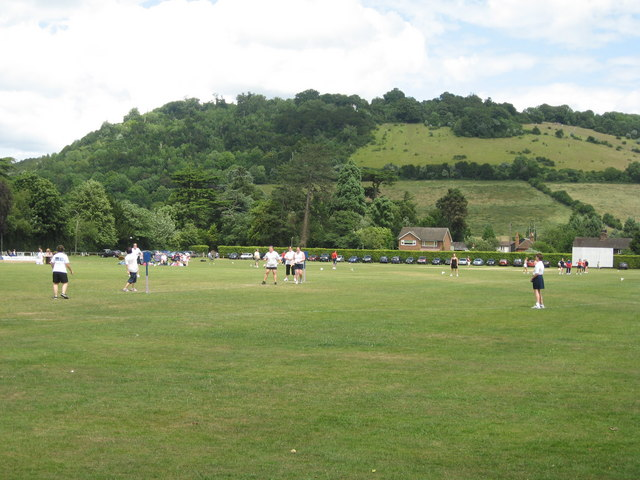
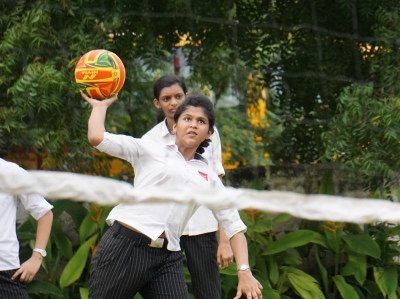
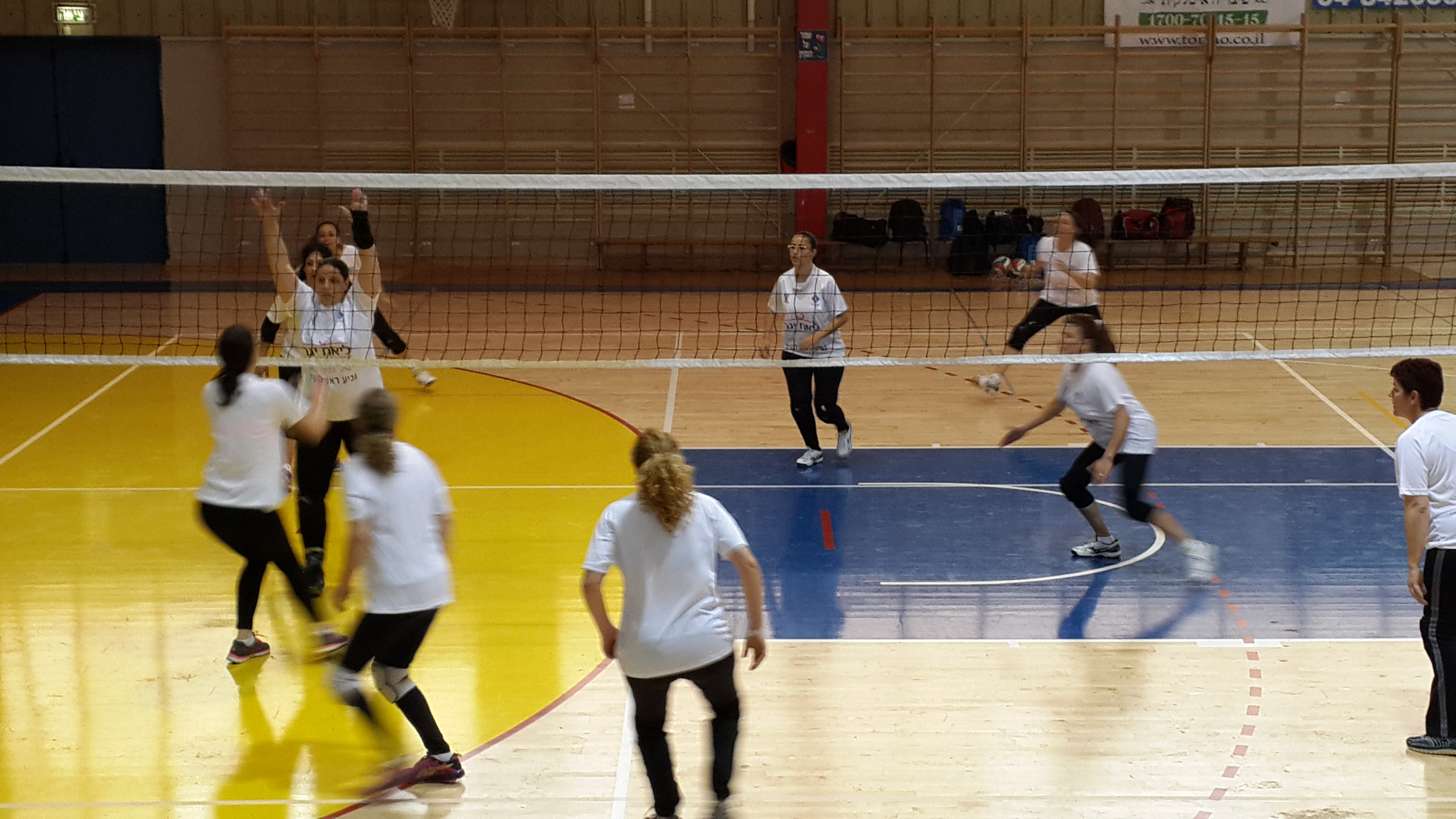
Female sports: female gymnastics; female figure skating (individual); synchronized swimming; netball; ringette; synchronized skating; stoolball; throwball; Newcomb ball

"Female sports" are rare and have been created specifically for the female sex and are not variants of popular men's sports. While sports which involve female participation are often collectively called, "women's sports", the overwhelming majority are not, and are in fact "female variants" a.k.a. "the female equivalent" of sports which were first played by and popularized by men and boys, making these two sporting groups distinct.

Some female sports can be traced back to a single inventor while others cannot and are difficult to identify. Some female sports are or can be attributed to a variety of individuals who helped contribute to its early development instead.

Below is a list of female sports.

Female sports
Female sport name	Type	Team or Single	First played	Inventor
Stoolball	bat and ball	Team	Sussex, England; 1500; 526 years ago	Unknown
Tumbling	discipline; artistic; gymnastics	Single	Possibly Prussia though probably older; 1776; 250 years ago	Unknown
Figure skating	singles discipline; ice sport; artistic; ice skating	Single	United States; 1860; 166 years ago	Jackson Haines, US
Synchronized swimming	aquatic; artistic; swimming	Team	Berlin, Germany; Canada; 1891; 135 years ago	Unknown
Newcomb ball	court sport; ball sport	Team	United Kingdom; 1895; 131 years ago	Clara Baer, US
Netball	court sport; ball sport	Team	England; 1895; 131 years ago; Madame Ostenburg's College	Clara Baer, US; Sweden; Martina Bergman-Österberg, UK
Throwball	court sport; ball sport	Team	England, Australia; 1930; 96 years ago	Unknown, YMCA
Acrobatic gymnastics	discipline; artistic; gymnastics	Single	Soviet Union; 1930; 96 years ago	Unknown
Synchronized skating	discipline; ice sport; artistic; ice skating	Team	US; 1956; 70 years ago; Ann Arbor, Michigan	US, Richard Porter
Ringette	ice sport; ice skating	Team	Canada; 1963; 63 years ago; Espanola, Ontario, Canada	Canada, Sam Jacks; Canada, Red McCarthy (first rules); Canada, Northern Ontario Recreation Directors Association (NORDA)
Barrel racing	Rodeo event	Horse and rider	Texas, year unknown	Unknown

== Professional sports ==
=== Overview ===
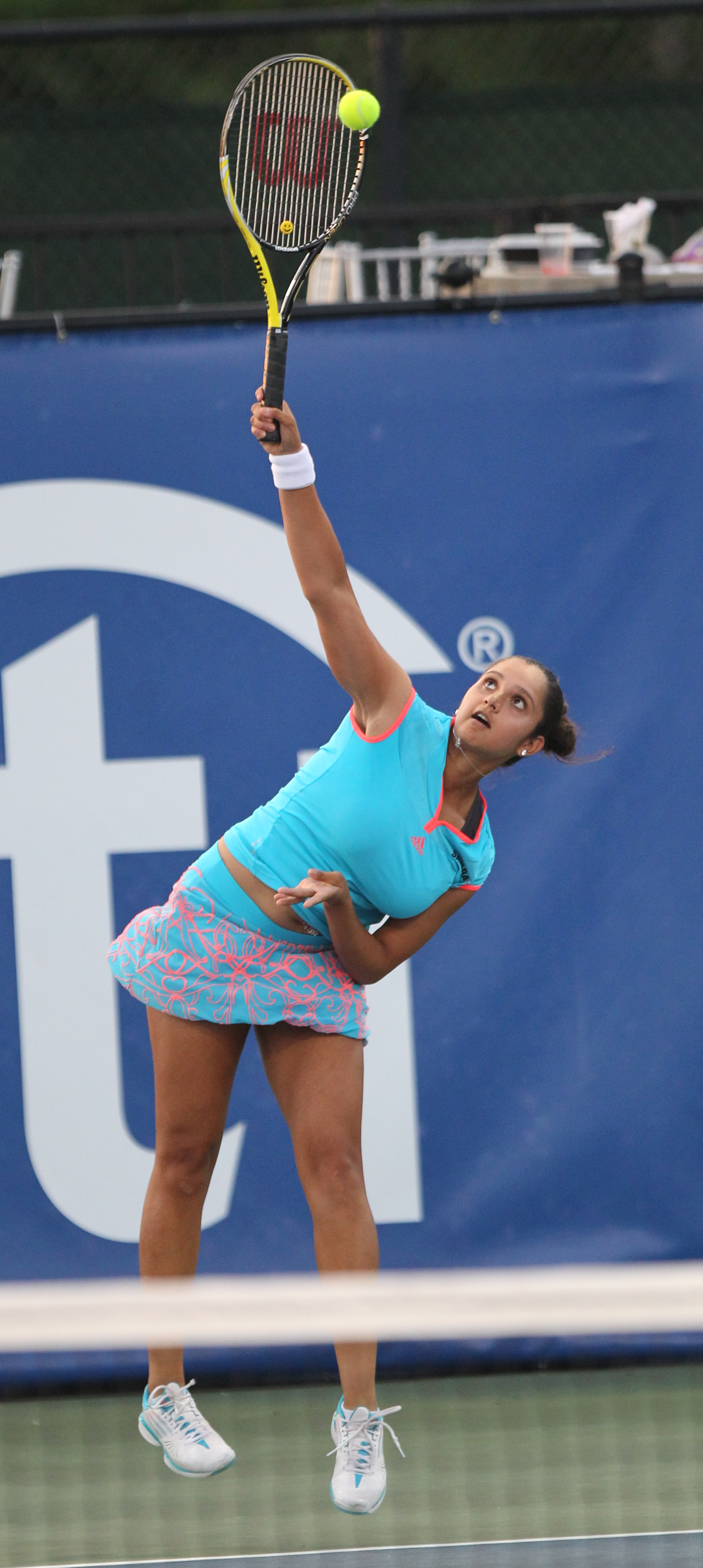
Sania Mirza, a former world No. 1 in women's tennis doubles

Professional sports refers to sports in which athletes are paid for their performance. Opportunities for women to play professional sports vary by country. Some women's professional sports leagues are directly affiliated with a men's professional sports league like the WNBA. Others are independently owned and operated like the Professional Women's Hockey League.

Global revenue from women's elite sports reached an estimated US$2.4 billion in 2025, led by basketball and association football, after growing 248 percent from 2022 to 2025. Deloitte forecast that revenue would reach at least US$3 billion in 2026, with commercial, matchday, and broadcast income included in the estimate. Deloitte projected that commercial revenue would account for 45 percent of the 2026 total, with matchday revenue at 30 percent and broadcast revenue at 25 percent. It projected that North America would generate 54 percent of the total and Europe 14 percent.

While women today do have the opportunity to play professional sports, the pay for women's professional sports is significantly lower than it is in men's professional sports. An American feminist theory known as the gender pay gap in sports is an attempt to explain the causes behind these differences.

It is not uncommon for professional athletes to hold second jobs in order to supplement their income due to low salary. Female professional athletes often play in smaller lower-quality facilities than male professional athletes due to low attendance. Women's professional sports are rarely broadcast regularly on live television. New developments in digital technology have created an opportunity for female leagues to live-stream competitions and events on social media platforms such as Twitter or Twitch instead.

Women face increasing challenges once they look to enter the business side of sports. Some research suggests that women occupy leadership positions in the sports industry at a lower rate than men however, the majority of these are positions are in men's professional sports rather than women's. When women do occupy the same positions as men, they may be paid less, although some research has shown revenue-specific variables may be more relevant than gender-specific variables when examining compensation levels.

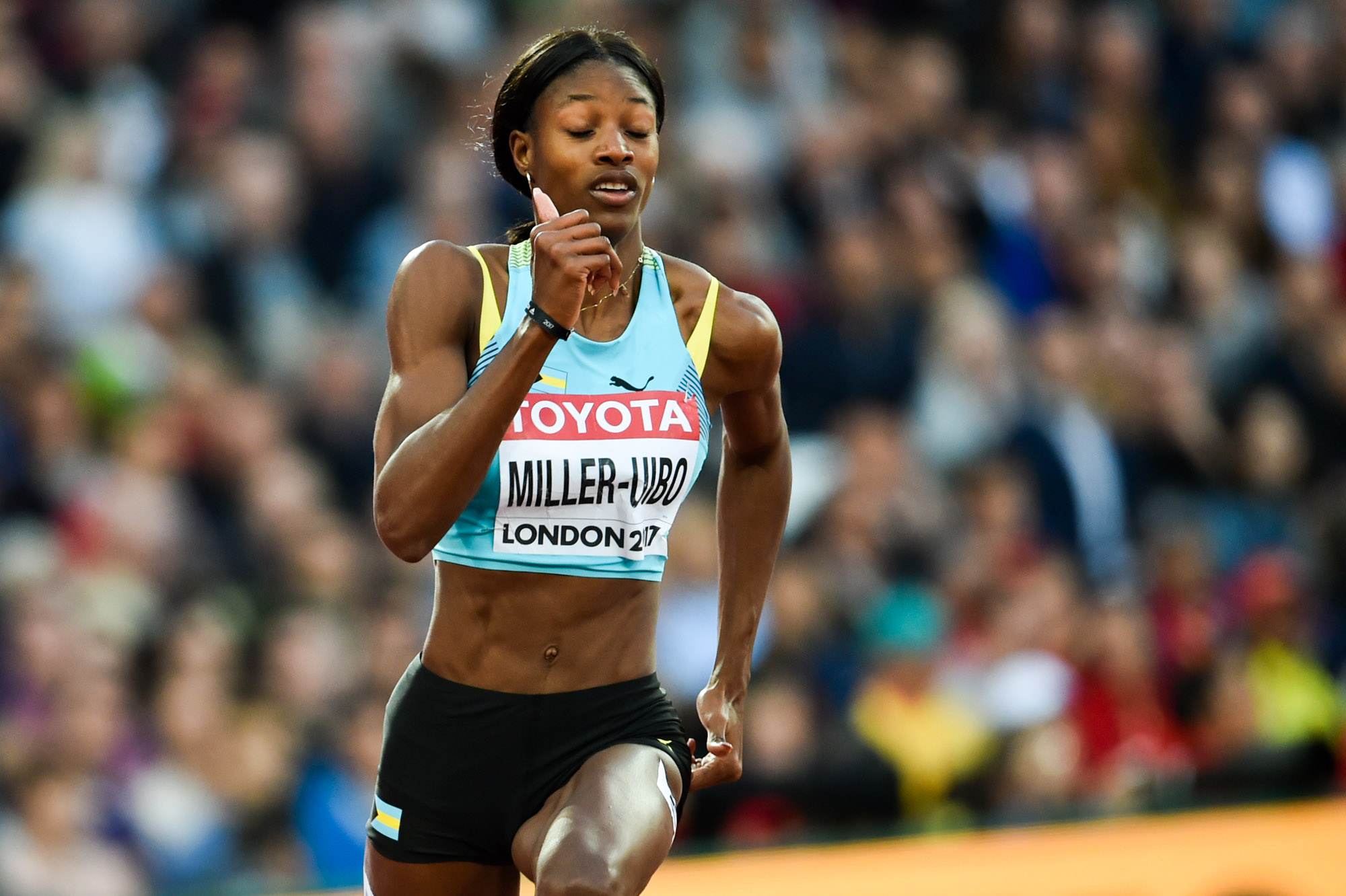
Shaunae Miller-Uibo races the 200 m at the 2017 World Championships in Athletics.

Although several professional women's sports leagues have been established throughout the world in the post-Title IX era, they are generally behind in terms of exposure, funding, and attendance compared to the men's teams. However, there are notable exceptions. The 2015 Women's World Cup final was the most-watched soccer game ever in the United States. And in 2017, Portland Thorns FC of the NWSL had higher average attendance than several men's professional teams, including 15 NBA teams, 13 NHL teams, and 1 MLB team. The Thorns' 2019 season saw an even higher average attendance of 20,098. This was higher than all but one of the 30 NBA teams in the 2018–19 season, all but three of the 31 NHL teams in the 2018–19 season, 15 of the 24 MLS teams in the 2019 season, and 6 of the 30 MLB teams in the 2019 season.

On August 30, 2023, the Nebraska Cornhuskers women's volleyball team hosted the Omaha Mavericks in front of 92,003 spectators at Memorial Stadium, setting a new documented attendance record for a women's sporting event. The record for a professional women's sporting event–91,648 spectators at Camp Nou—was set in 2022 by FC Barcelona Femení during a UEFA Women's Champions League match.

In April 2024, the 2023–24 A-League Women season set the record for the most attended season of any women's sport in Australian history, with the season recording a total attendance of 284,551 on 15 April 2024, and finishing with a final total attendance of 312,199.

=== Active women's professional leagues and associations ===
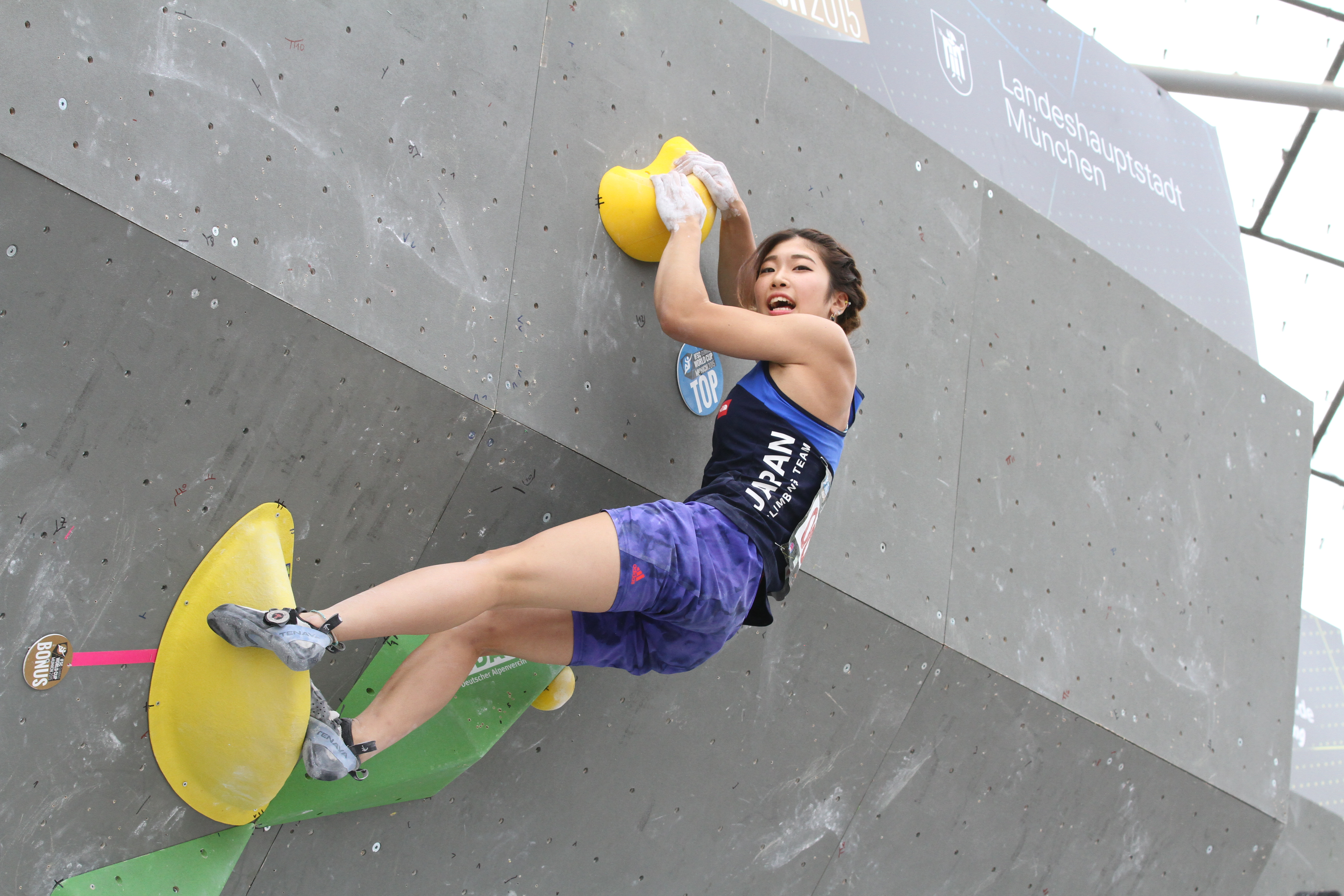
Miho Nonaka at the Bouldering World Cup, Munich, 2015

International

Region	Sport	League / Association Name
Europe	Golf	Ladies European Tour
United States and Canada	Ice hockey	Professional Women's Hockey League
Worldwide	Tennis	Women's Tennis Association

National

Country	Sport	League / Association Name
Australia	Association football	A-League Women
Australia	Basketball	Women's National Basketball League
Australia	Cricket	Women's Big Bash League
Australia	Golf	ALPG Tour
Australia	Netball	Super Netball
Canada	Association football	Northern Super League
China	Basketball	Women's Chinese Basketball Association
China	Golf	China LPGA Tour
Denmark	Handball	HTH Ligaen
England	Association football	Women's Super League
England	Association football	Women's Championship
England	Rugby union	Premiership Women's Rugby
France	Association football	Première Ligue
France	Association football	Seconde Ligue
Germany	Association football	Frauen-Bundesliga
India	Association football	Indian Women's League
India	Cricket	Women's Premier League
India	Field Hockey	Hockey India League
Italy	Association football	Serie A (women's football)
Japan	Association football	WE League
Japan	Golf	LPGA of Japan Tour
Mexico	Association football	Liga MX Femenil
New Zealand	Netball	ANZ Premiership
Philippines	Basketball	Women's National Basketball League
Philippines	Volleyball	Premier Volleyball League
Russia	Basketball	Russian Women's Basketball Premier League
South Korea	Golf	LPGA of Korea Tour
Spain	Association football	Liga F
Sweden	Association football	Damallsvenskan
Sweden	Ice hockey	Swedish Women's Hockey League
Turkey	Volleyball	Turkish Women's Volleyball League
United States	Association football	National Women's Soccer League
United States	Association football	USL Super League
United States	Basketball	Women's National Basketball Association
United States	Basketball	Athletes Unlimited Pro Basketball
United States	Golf	Ladies Professional Golf Association
United States	Golf	Legends Tour (age 45 and over)
United States	Golf	Epson Tour (second-tier tour)
United States	Lacrosse	Athletes Unlimited Lacrosse
United States	Lacrosse	Women's Lacrosse League
United States	Softball	Association of Fastpitch Professionals
United States	Softball	Athletes Unlimited Softball
United States	Softball	Women's Professional Fastpitch
United States	Volleyball	Athletes Unlimited Volleyball
United States	Volleyball	League One Volleyball Pro
Pro Volleyball Federation	Volleyball	

=== Battle for equality ===
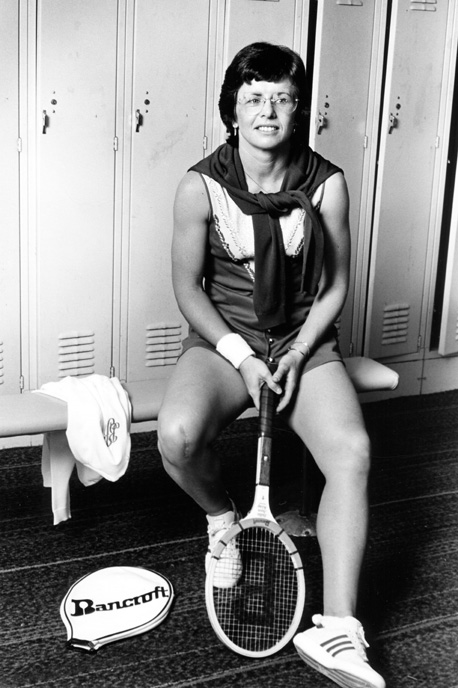
Billie Jean King in 1978 photographed by Lynn Gilbert (1978)

Equal representation in organized sport for girls and women is commonly referred to as the "battle for equality" and includes a variety of competing feminist ideologies. Worldwide, the dominant representative sex in sport is male both financially and globally except in the rare case of sports created specifically for girls and women and certain sport disciplines. Sports dominated by women instead of men are few and the majority of organized sports dubbed "women's sports" or the "women's game" were created as the female equivalent of sports which were first popularized by men and male athletes. Over time there have been gradual and increasing efforts by different groups, individuals and lobbies in different countries to find ways which enable women to gain equal representation and support like their male counterparts. This change can be witnessed at the national level in different countries and in women's professional leagues. In terms of finding ways to acquire better pay and better funding, efforts largely began in the 20th century. A significant historical marker occurred during the 2012 London Olympics where it became the first Olympic games in which women competed in every sport.

In some areas, sex and gender can serve as a selective and primary factor in terms of determining if women's sports should receive the same treatment as men's. Whether or not women are as able-bodied as men can serve as the basis of decision making criteria. Gender-based characteristics associated with masculinity and femininity can become the deciding factor for individuals in terms of their potential sports participation, but can also affect organizing sporting bodies where this has been held as a justifiable dismissal of sports equity for female participants- Colateral to these beliefs about femininity arise health related issues historically unspoken: the menstrual health of female athletes; in a recent review by Mendez-Dominguez & cols. authors state that the limited evidence of clinical trials regarding menstrual health and menstrual-cycle-associated symptoms indicates a need for specific sports medicine research and emphasizes that routine assessment of menstrual symptoms, perceived recovery, fatigue, training tolerance, and readiness to compete may help identify opportunities to optimize athletes menstrual health, well-being and performance.

Although there are various goals and reasons behind organized team sports participation in Western cultures, one perspective claims that sport is principally organized around the political project of physically and symbolically elevating men over women. One study has claimed that notions of audience interest or preference were based on personal beliefs and assumptions rather than evidence or research and that in some cases these beliefs and assumptions were the reason why coverage of men's professional sports is prioritized.

Pay gap

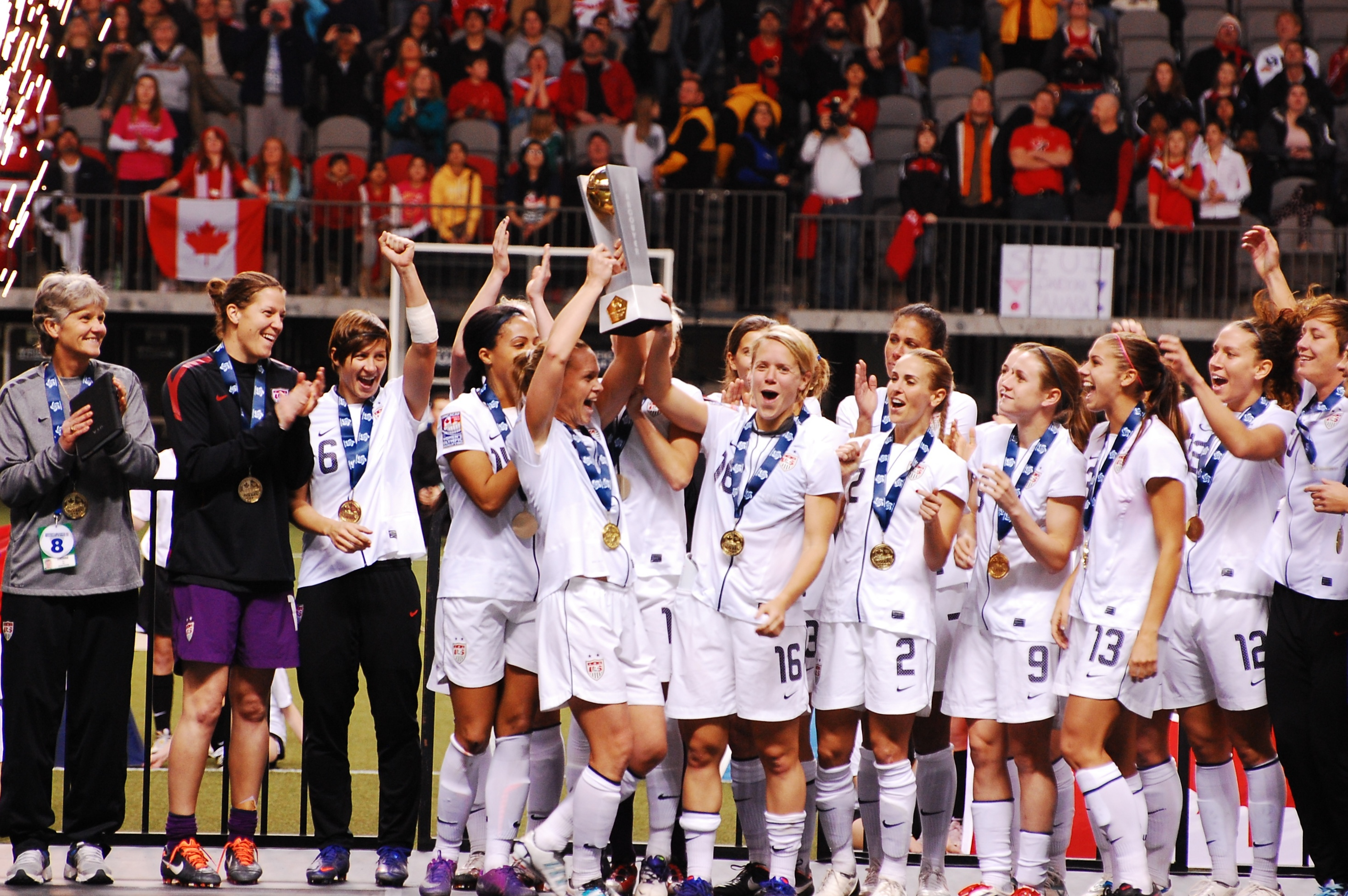
The United States Women's National Soccer Team celebrating their 2012 CONCACAF Olympic Qualifiers Tournament championship

The pay gap in women sports is a controversial issue. Women athletes, in their respective sports, are often paid far less than their male counterparts. The difference between the American women's and men's soccer teams' salaries has been used as an example regarding pay inequality. Women on the U.S. national team earned $99,000 per year, while men earned $263,320 if they were to win 20 exhibition matches. There is a substantial gap in rewards in regards to winning the FIFA World Cup. The German men's national team earned 35 million dollars, while the American women's national team earned 2 million dollars after winning the World Cup. The battle in equality for fair pay divulges in to other sports in which men earn far more than women. Golf is another sport which has a significant rising female presence. In 2014, the PGA Tour awarded US$340 million in prize money for men's tournaments, compared to 62 million dollars awarded to the LPGA Tour. Basketball is another sport which has surged in popularity in the last few decades and has significant female presence. In the United States, the NBA organizes top-level professional basketball competition for both sexes, with men playing in the NBA proper and women in the WNBA. As of 2021, a WNBA player's minimum salary is $57,000, while an NBA player's minimum salary is $898,310. An average NBA player makes over $5 million while an average WNBA player makes $72,000. In September 2018, the World Surf League announced equal pay for both male and female athletes for all events, contributing to the conversation in the world of professional sports surrounding equality.

Social media

The advent of social media has had a positive impact on women's sports by providing more platforms for advertising and conversation. It has created more opportunities to increase the promotion of women's sports and helped form the establishment of communities both online and offline around women's and girls sports, including access to women's sports news. This pattern is expected to continue into the future and has been presented as a powerful tool to help offset the issues of gender bias and other disparities.

==== Australia ====
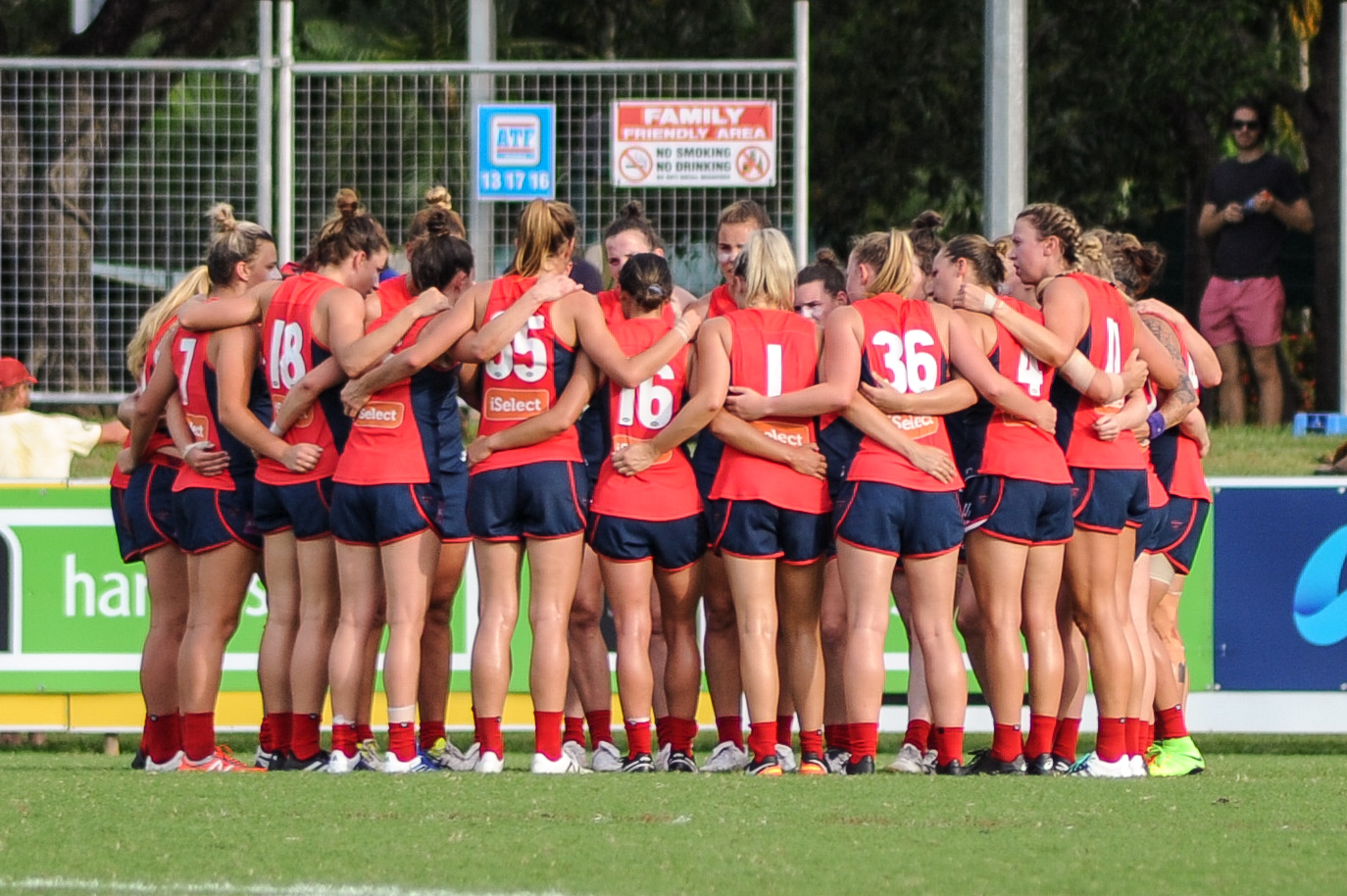
Melbourne women's Australian rules football team discussing game-plan

In September 2015, the Australia women's national soccer team (nicknamed the Matildas) announced that it had canceled a sold-out tour of the United States due to a dispute with Football Federation Australia (FFA; known since November 2020 as Football Australia) over their pay. Their salary was below minimum wage levels in Australia. The Matildas requested health care, maternity leave, and improved travel arrangements, as well as an increased salary. The players also said that their low salaries forced them to remain living at home, since they could not afford rent, and their strict training schedule meant they were unable to get another job.

In September 2017, a new pay deal was announced for players in Australia's national soccer league, the W-League. The deal included an increase in wages, an increase in the salary cap, improved medical standards, and a formal maternity policy. Some commentators have attributed the success of the new W-League deal to the Matildas' boycott in 2015.

In November 2019, the FFA announced a new contract with the union Professional Footballers Australia (PFA) in which the Matildas and the men's national team (the Caltex Socceroos) will receive equal shares of total player revenue and equal resources. In addition, the guaranteed minimum salary for a player on the Matildas will increase as a result of this deal.

In December 2020, Football Australia announced that it had unbundled the Australian Professional Leagues (APL) from the rest of the governing body, giving APL control of operational, commercial, and marketing for the top level of women's, men's, and youth soccer in the country. APL soon rebranded the W-League as A-League Women.

==== China ====
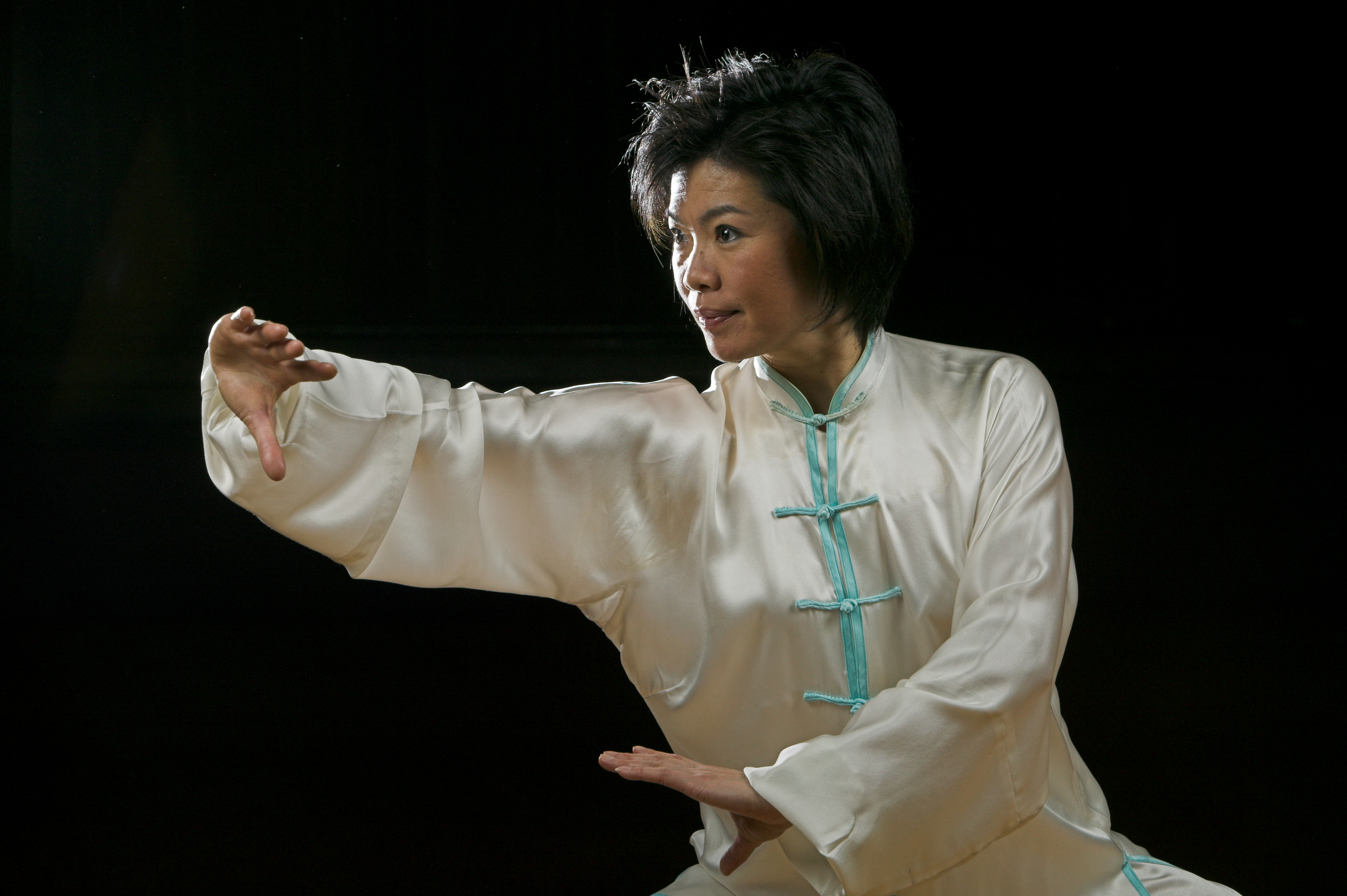
Hao Zhihua

One of the earliest examples of women's sports in modern China was Qiu Jin. Qiu Jin, a Chinese revolutionary during the late 1800s and early 1900s, trained women to be soldiers alongside men in sports societies. They were taught fencing, riding, and gymnastics. According to Susan Bronwell, the most important moment for women's sports in China came in 1981 with a Chinese victory in the 1981 FIVB Women's World Cup in Tokyo, Japan. This victory made the female volleyball players household names in China, though the victory was portrayed as the work of leading male government officials like Ma Qiwei, He Long, and Zhou Enlai, who helped contribute at various stages to the success of the team. The victory symbolized a growth of women's sports in China after the Cultural Revolution of the 1960s and 1970s, wherein many athletes were suppressed: In 1994, the International Society for Sports Psychiatry (ISSP) treated many athletes. Like teaching and collaborating with clinicians in sports medicine, helping fairness in sports, etc.

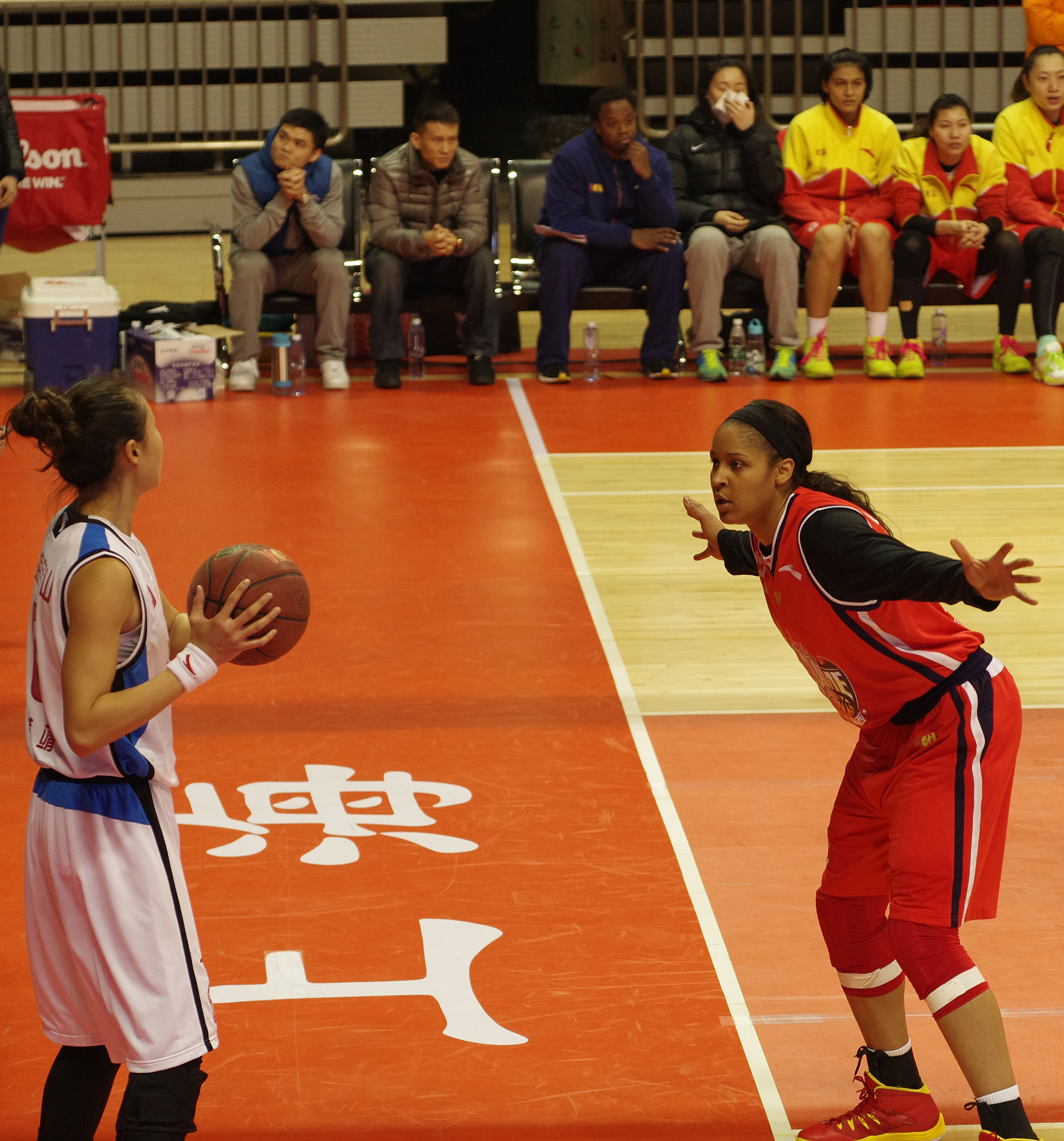
Shanxi Flame's Maya Moore defending an inbound pass from Shanghai Octopus's Huang Jing during a January 2014 WCBA game in Shanghai

In the years following the women's volleyball victory, female athletes generally had greater success in international sports than males, and so they became the symbolic figureheads in the revival of Chinese nationalism.

— Susan Bronwell, Beijing's Games, Pg. 107

Contemporary Chinese sports teams are noted for their wide breadth of participation by female athletes, specifically in the Olympic Games. A Herfindahl Index (a measure often used in economics to show the degree of concentration when individuals are classified by type, and a lower number indicates higher diversity) showing Female Participation in the 2012 Olympics indicated China's female Olympic delegation, the fourth largest present, to be the second most spread out across all events at 0.050, compared to higher numbers from over 190 other delegations. The same index showed the ratio of women to men to be 7 to 10. 213 total female athletes participated. In total, approximately 60% of Chinese Olympic gold medals were earned by female athletes over the last 8 Olympic games. Challenges to equality remain such as media representation. According to Yu Chia Chen, female Asian athletes receive much less coverage than their male counterparts. Another report indicates Chinese girls and women are also less likely to be exposed to sports programming on television.

==== Ireland ====
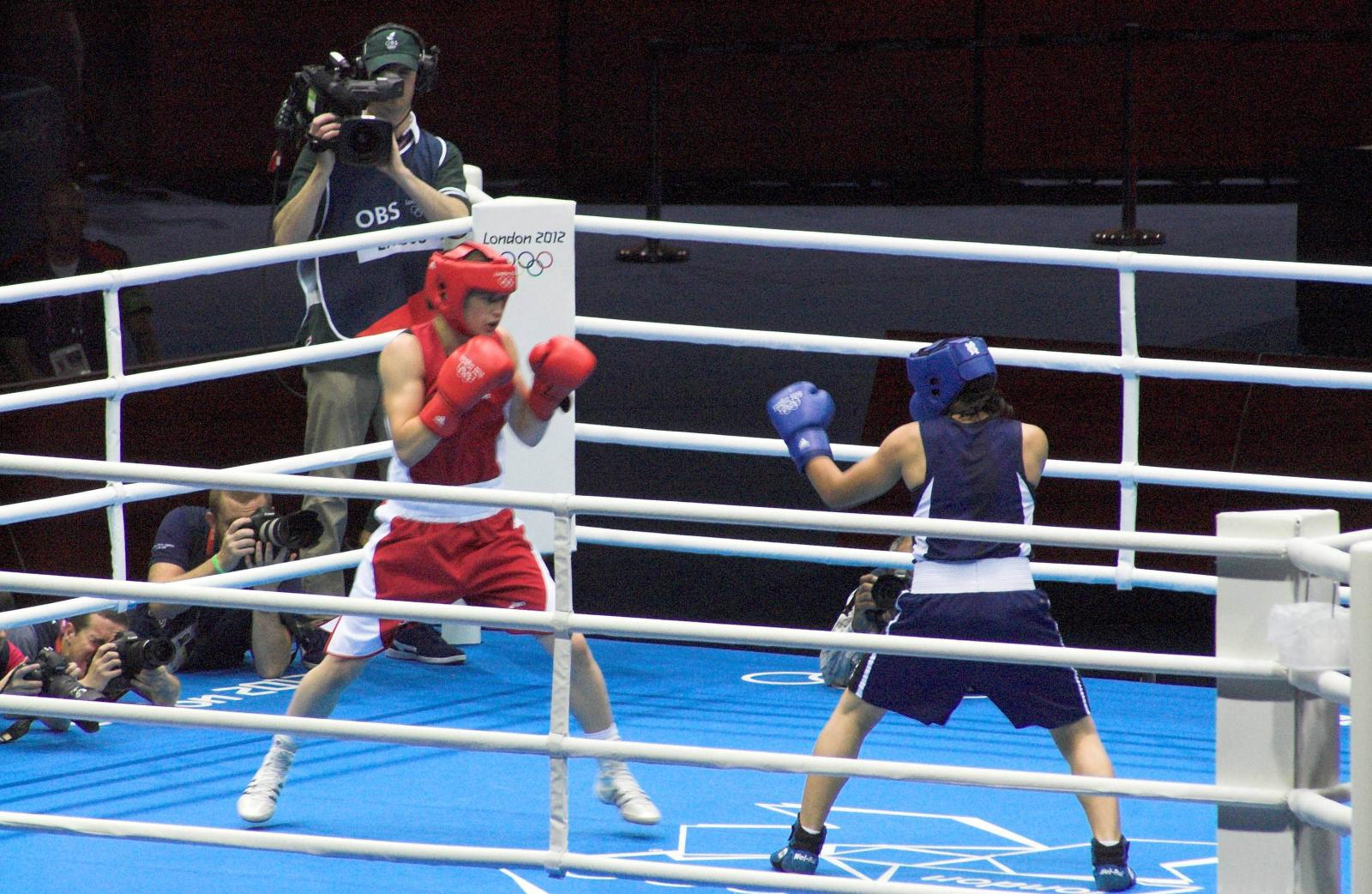
Katie Taylor (in red) vs. Mavzuna Chorieva at the 2012 Olympic semi-finals

In October 2017, the Irish Rugby Football Union (IRFU) advertised an available position for head coach of the Irish women's national rugby team. The job was advertised as "part-time", "casual", and available on six-month basis. Players expressed their disagreement with the decision, believing it was a sign that the IRFU was disrespecting and not prioritizing the women's game. In response to this announcement, the players highlighted what they perceived as the IRFU's lack of commitment to the long-term development of the women's game by wearing bracelets with "#Legacy" written on them for games with their club teams in the All Ireland League.

==== Jamaica ====
The Jamaican women's national soccer team (nicknamed the Reggae Girlz) participated in the 2019 FIFA Women's World Cup. This was the first Women's World Cup the country had qualified for, and the country was also the first Caribbean country to ever qualify. However, in September 2019, members of the team, including Khadija Shaw and Allyson Swaby, posted a graphic on Instagram with captions stating that they had not been paid by the Jamaica Football Federation (JFF) for nine months of work. They announced that the team would not participate in any future tournaments until they received payment. JFF President Michael Ricketts later announced that the team would be paid by the end of September. In October 2019, the Reggae Girlz began playing again, and they won their group in the Qualification Tournament for the 2020 CONCACAF Women's Olympic Qualifying Competition.

The Jamaican national netball team (nicknamed the Sunshine Girls) is ranked fourth in the world, as of July 2019. However, the team has not been well-funded, and had to resort to crowdfunding to attend the 2019 Netball World Cup. After receiving support from sponsors, the Sunshine Girls were able to go to the tournament, where they placed fifth overall.

==== Muslim world ====
Muslim women are less likely to take part in sport than Western non-Muslims. This is particularly so for women in Arab societies. The traditions of Islamic modesty in dress and requirements for women's sport to take place in a single-sex environment make sports participation more difficult for devout female adherents. The lack of availability of suitably modest sports clothing and sports facilities that allow women to play in private contributes to the lack of participation. Cultural norms of women's roles and responsibilities towards the family may also be a source of discouragement from time-consuming sports practice.

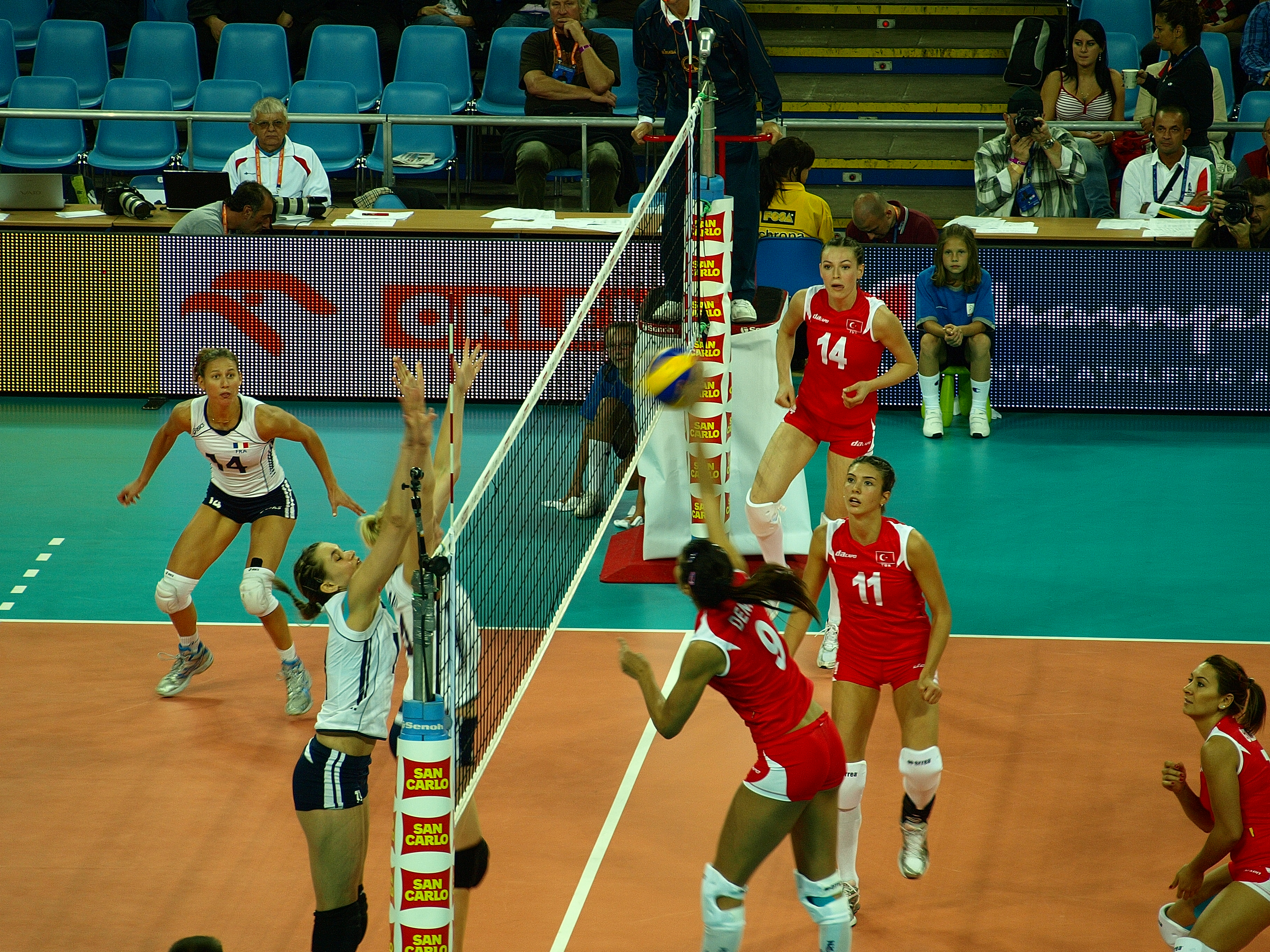
2009 Women's European Volleyball Championship match between Turkey and France in Hala Stulecia in Wrocław (Poland)

Islamic tenets and religious texts suggest that women's sports in general should be promoted and are not against the values of the religion. The Quranic statements that followers of Islam should be healthy, fit and make time for leisure are not sex-specific. Muhammad is said to have raced his wife Aisha on several occasions, with Aisha beating him the first couple of times. Correspondingly, some scholars have proposed that Muslim women's lack of engagement with sport is due to cultural or societal reasons, rather than strictly religious ones.

However, besides religious testaments, there are many barriers for Muslim women in relation to sports participation. A significant barrier to Muslim women's sports participation is bans on the Islamic headscarf, commonly known as the hijab. FIFA instituted such a ban in 2011, preventing the Iranian women's national football team from competing. They have since repealed the ban, but other organizations, including FIBA, maintain such regulations. At the same time, many Muslim female athletes have achieved significant success in athletic competitions. Some have also used sports towards their own empowerment, working for women's rights, education, and health and wellbeing.

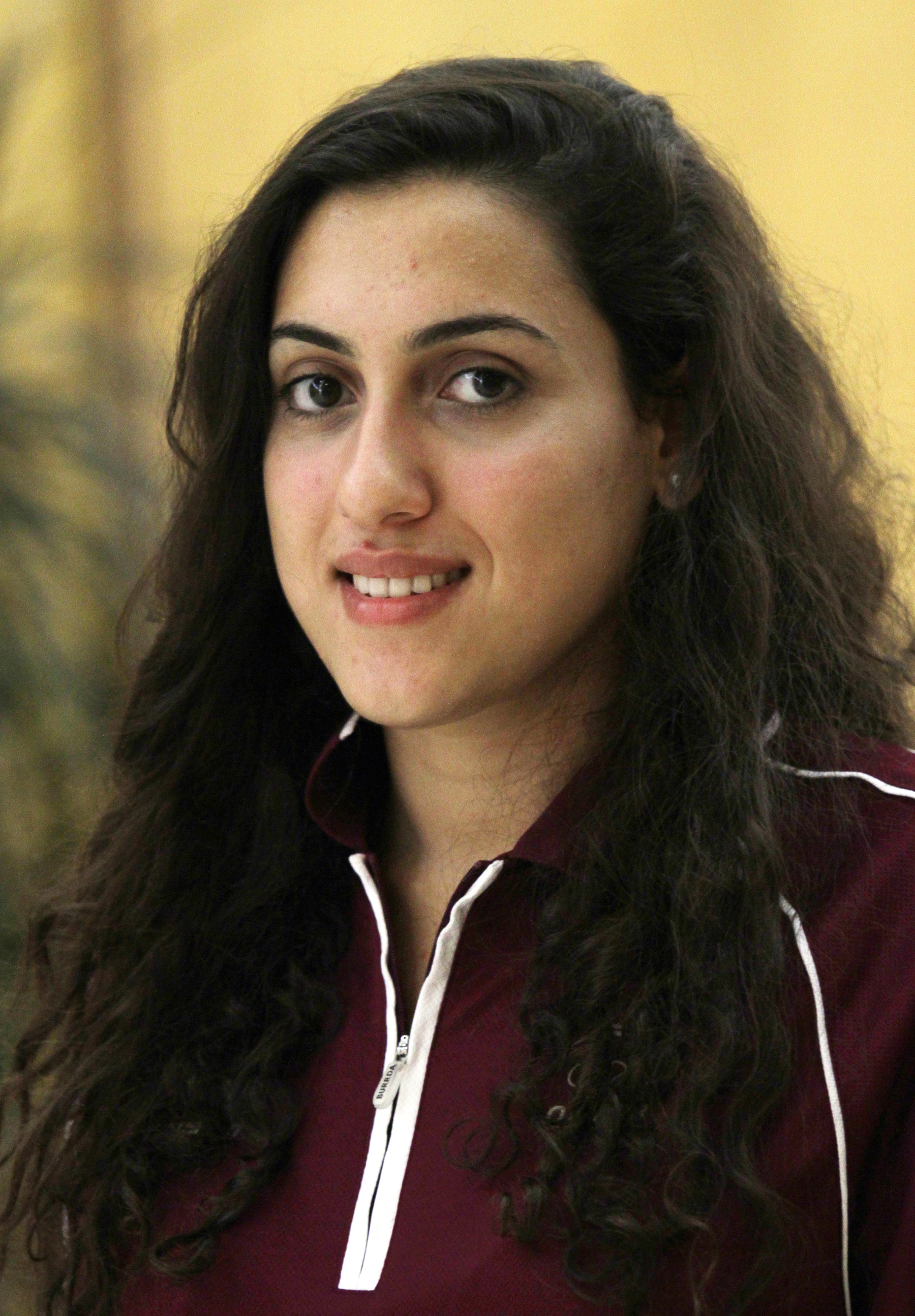
Nada Arkaji first woman to represent Qatar at the Olympics.

Iranian women were banned from attending a volleyball game and an Iranian girl was arrested for attending a match. Iran was given the right to host the International Beach Volleyball tournament, and many Iranian women were looking forward to attending the event. However, when the women tried to attend the event, they were disallowed, and told it was forbidden to attend by the FIVB. The women took to social media to share their outrage; however the Federation of International Beach volleyball refuted the accusations, saying it was a misunderstanding. This is one of the instances of unfair treatment of women, trying to participate in supporting their teams in Iran.

In October 2018 Iran announced that, after 40 years, it would allow women to enter sport arenas. On September 22, 2019, the Iranian authorities assured FIFA that women would be able to attend the October qualifier of 2022 World Cup in Tehran, stated Gianni Infantino.

==== Nigeria ====
In 2016, the Nigerian women's national soccer team, known as the Super Falcons, won the 2016 Africa Women Cup of Nations. The players alleged that they had not received their earned bonuses from winning the tournament owed to them by the Nigeria Football Federation (NFF). The NFF promised that it would pay them, but said the "money [was] not readily available at the moment." In response, players engaged in a sit-in at their hotel as well as publicly demonstrated outside Nigeria's National Assembly.

In 2019, the Super Falcons participated in the 2019 Women's World Cup and were eliminated from the tournament in the Round of 16. Following their elimination, the players engaged in another sit-in at their hotel, refusing to leave Paris until the NFF paid them the bonuses and daily allowances they had earned both from the World Cup as well as from other matches played in 2016 and 2017.

==== Norway ====
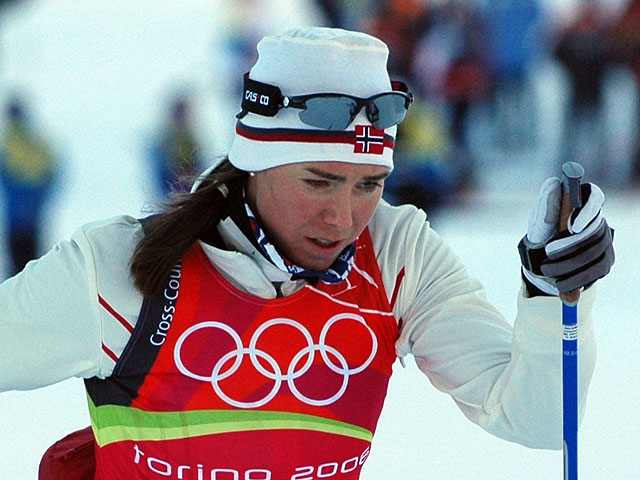
Ella Gjømle at the 2006 Olympics in Torino.

Norwegian sports are shaped by the values associated with them. For example, aggression generally is associated with males and being personable, with females. However, in terms of Norwegian handball, a study done by the Norwegian School of Sports and Sciences shows that gender is disregarded when the sport is covered in the media. The same study revealed that Women's handball is covered and followed as equally if not more than the men's team. In contrast to international handball coverage, the Norwegian coverage of Women's and Men's handball are discussed in the media using the same or similar verbiage. While they are especially noticeable in handball, equality and opportunity in Norwegian sports is not limited to the handball. Many top-female athletes from a number of sports have come from Norway. The act of playing or coaching were described slightly differently but categorized as successful using similar terms despite the gender of the coach or the player.

Ada Hegerberg is a highly skilled and decorated Norwegian soccer player, having won numerous Champions League and Division 1 Féminine titles with French club Olympique Lyonnais. She also won the first-ever women's Ballon D'Or, a prestigious award given to the best soccer player in the world. However, in 2017, she stopped playing with the Norwegian national team, citing unequal pay and conditions between the women's team and the men's team as her reason for stepping away from the team. She said she would no longer play for the national team until she felt that it was more respected by the Norwegian Football Federation and the culture surrounding women's soccer had improved, which meant she did not participate in the high-profile 2019 FIFA Women's World Cup.

==== Philippines ====
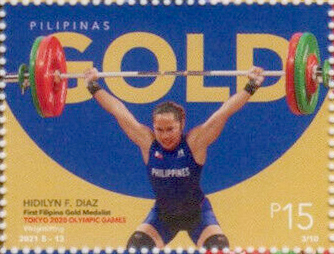
Hidilyn Diaz on a 2021 stamp

The Magna Carta for Women in the Philippines (Republic Act No. 9710.) mandates equal participation of women in sports among other non-sports related provisions.

In the Philippines, basketball which is often referred to as the country's most popular sport is male-dominated although there are efforts to promote the sport to Filipino women. In 2020, the Women's National Basketball League became the country's first professional women's basketball league.

Prior attempts to provide female players to play competitive basketball included the semi-professional Women's Philippine Basketball League which ran from 1998 to 1999, and in 2008. In 3x3 basketball, the men's professional league the Philippine Basketball Association, organized the short-lived PBA Women's 3x3 which was controversial for its haircut rules which barred women from sporting a "boy's cut".

==== South Africa ====
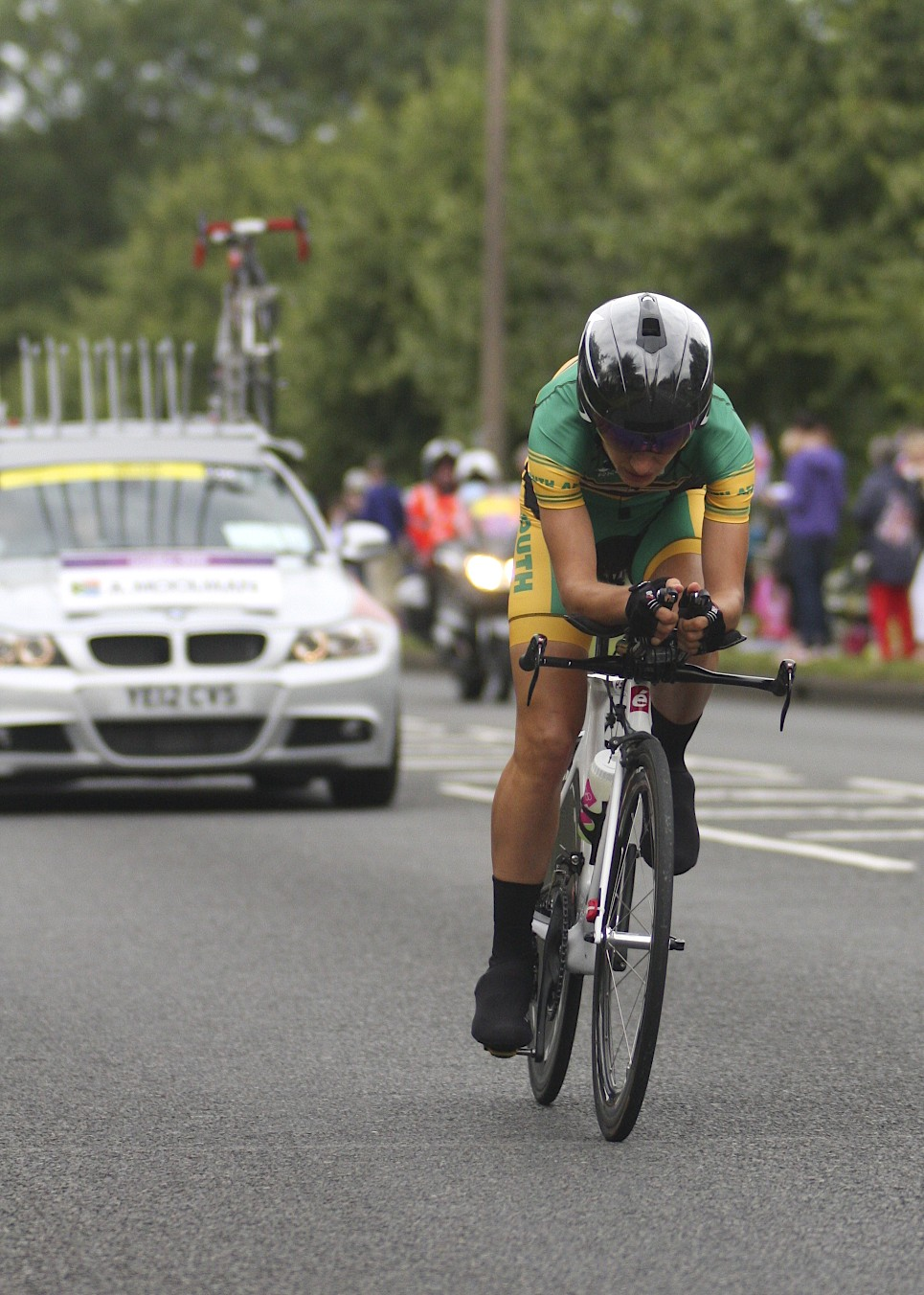
Ashleigh Moolman Pasio during the road time trial at the 2012 London Olympics

Between 2004 and 2008, the previously highly successful South African women's national soccer team, known as Banyana Banyana, began to struggle on the field due to a lack of a permanent coach. Members of the South African Football Association (SAFA) attributed the declining quality of play to the players' "lack of femininity" (Engh 2010), and the players were instructed to take etiquette classes and maintain stereotypical feminine hairstyles, as well as wear more feminine uniforms while playing. In response, players threatened to strike unless they were able to return to their preferred styles of dress.

In 2018, Banyana Banyana was not paid the agreed-upon amount owed to them after qualifying for the 2018 Africa Women Cup of Nations (AWCON), and they protested by not returning their official national team uniforms. In January 2019, the team was again not paid their stipends and bonuses, despite finishing in second place at AWCON. They threatened to strike by not attending interviews or team practices, as well as not playing in a game against the Dutch national team. However, in May 2019, it was announced that Banyana Banyana would receive equal pay with the men's team heading into the 2019 FIFA Women's World Cup.

==== Sweden ====
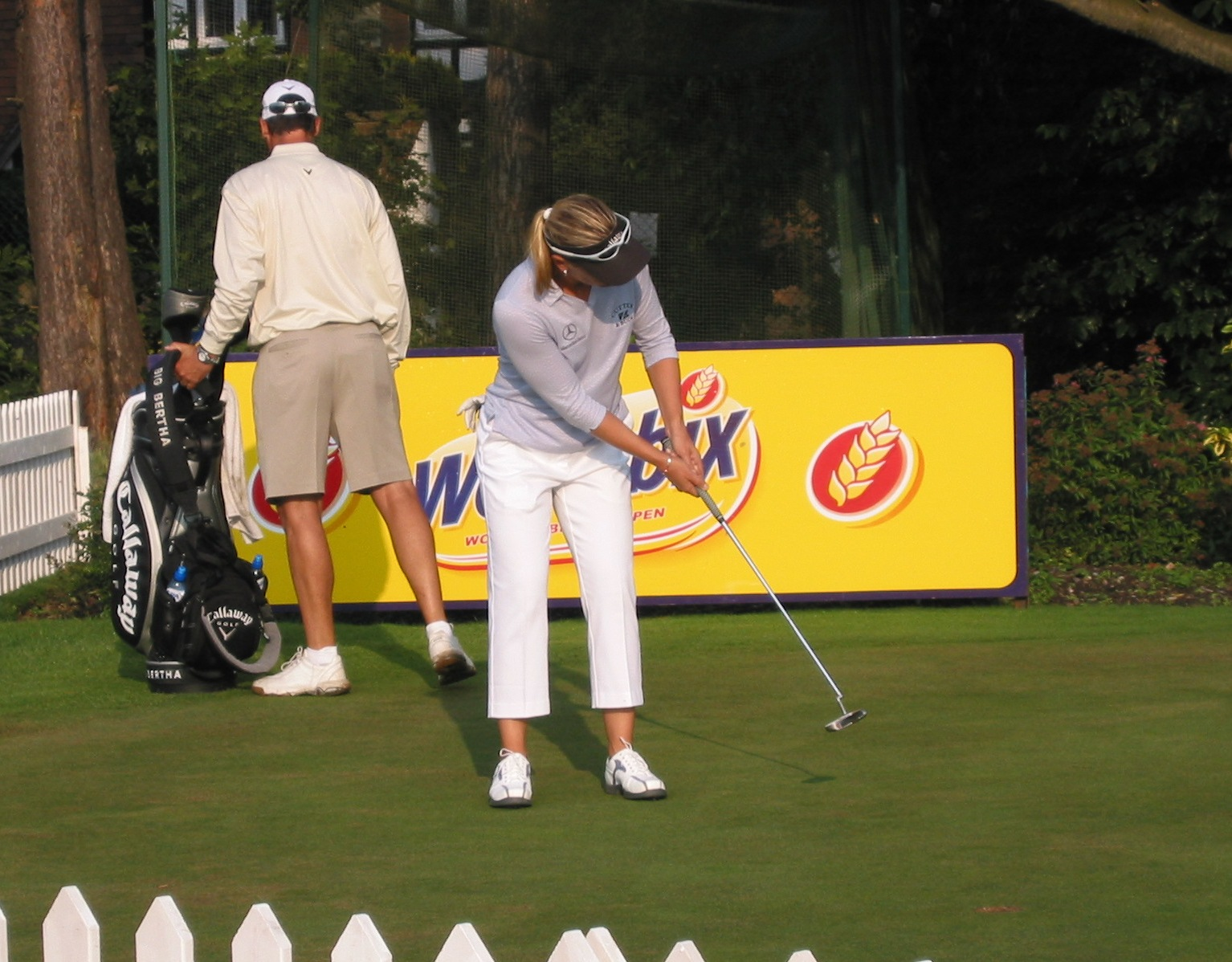
Annika Sörenstam is a Swedish professional golfer.

In Sweden, public funds are mostly given to men's hockey and football, and the women's team are left without proper funding. In 2016, Al Jazeera published an article bringing the discrimination that female Swedish athletes face to light by mentioning the double standard put on female athletes in terms of having to work double and still not receive the recognition or pay of the men's teams. Sweden is recognized as being a feminist country; however, the wage gap is significant between male and female athletes. In 2013, Swedish striker, Zlatan Ibrahimovic earned $16.7 million a year playing for Paris Saint-German, whereas Lotta Schellin who played for Lyon in France only earned $239,720. The wage gap is also evident among coaches. The difference in pay is evident in how male athletes and female athletes are able to spend their time between games. Women often have to work between training and games to make a living and to pay for their training camps, whereas men have that time to recuperate and relax; men also do not pay to attend training camps.

In August 2019, the Swedish women's national ice hockey team boycotted the team's training camp and the Five Nations Tournament. In a movement they called #FörFramtiden (in English, "For the Future"), all 43 players invited to camp cited lack of equal pay as well as various instances of poor treatment by Svenska Ishockeyförbundet (the Swedish Ice Hockey Association, or SIF) toward the national team, including, but not limited to:

- Team travel conditions – traveling by ferry instead of by plane to games; arriving to games one day before a tournament began, without accounting for time differences and jet lag
- Team uniforms – players are provided men's clothing by SIF, not women's clothing
- Nutrition – players are provided expired products
- Lack of development – players allege that SIF has not adequately created a program to foster development of women's hockey at the youth level

The Four Nations Cup, originally scheduled for November 2019, was canceled by SIF due to the players' dispute with the federation.

Following the boycott, it was announced in October 2019 that the players had reached a new agreement with the federation, and that the team will begin training in November 2019 and play in a tournament against Switzerland, Finland, and Germany in December 2019. The new deal includes terms guaranteeing performance-based bonuses and additional compensation.

==== United States ====
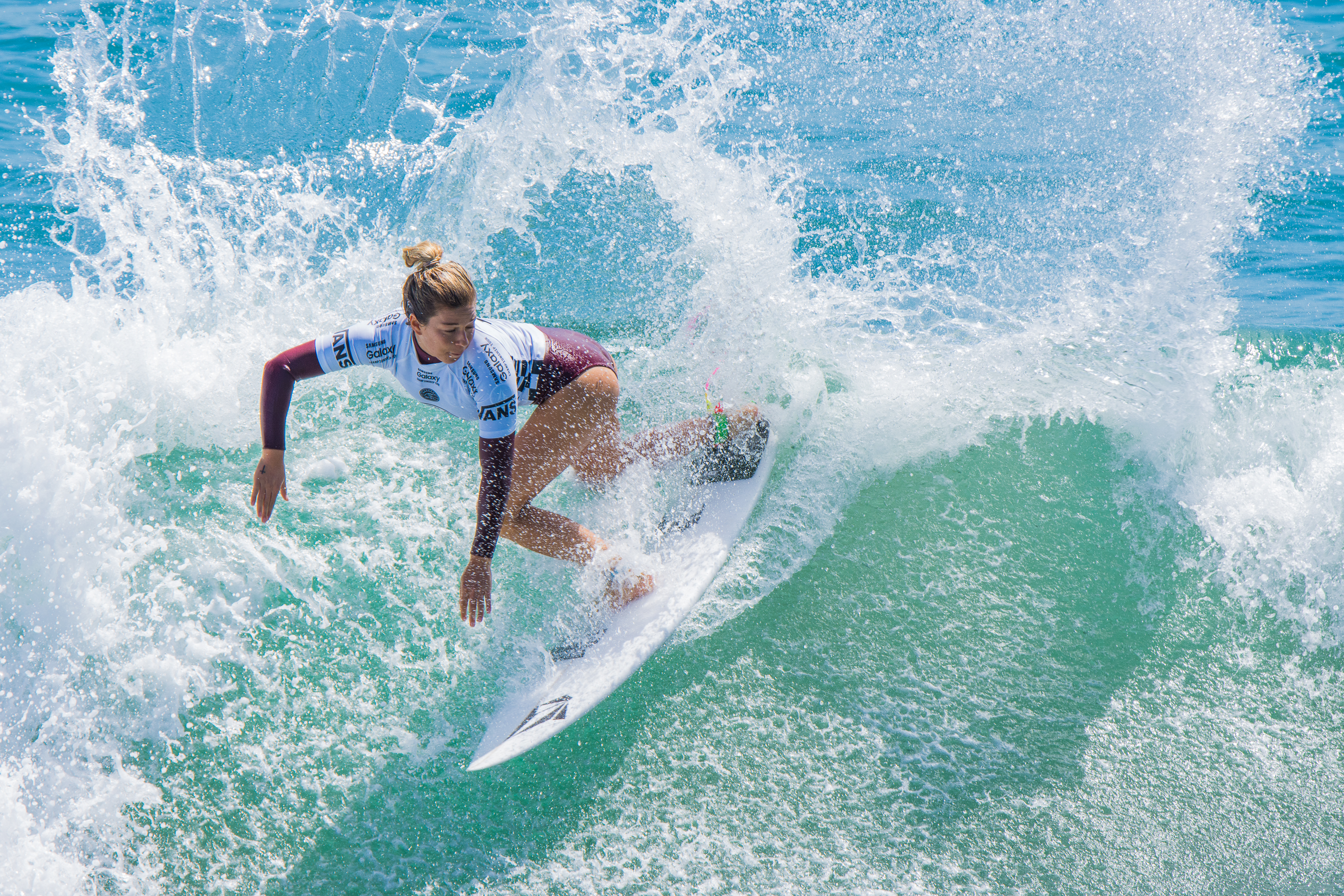
Coco Ho lors du Vans US Open of Surfing 2015 à Huntington Beach (États-Unis).

Women make up 54% of enrollment at 832 schools that responded to an NCAA gender equity study in 2000; however, females at these institutions only account for 41% of the athletes. Before Title IX, 90% of women's college athletic programs were run by women, but by 1992 the number dropped to 42% since Title IX requires that there are equal opportunities for both genders. Many of the issues today often revolve around the amount of money going into women's and men's sports. According to 2000–2001 figures, men's college programs still have many advantages over women's in the average number of scholarships (60.5%), operating expenses (64.5%), recruiting expenses (68.2%) and head coaching salaries (59.5%). Other forms of inequality are in the coaching positions. Before Title IX, women coached 90% of women's teams; in 1978 that percentage dropped to 58, and in 2004 it dropped even more to 44 percent. In 1972, women administered 90 percent of women's athletic programs, and in 2004 this fell to 19 percent. Also in 2004, 18 percent of all women's programs had no women administrators. In 2004, there were 3,356 administrative jobs in NCAA women's athletic programs and of those jobs, women held 35 percent of them.

The fight for equality extends to the wallet. On March 30, 2016, five players from the U.S. women's soccer team filed a federal complaint of wage discrimination against U.S. Soccer, the governing body that pays both the women's and men's team. The complaint argues that U.S. Soccer pays players on the women's team as little as forty percent of what it pays players on the men's team. This pay discrepancy exists despite the fact that the women's team has been much more successful in international competitions; the women's team has won four Olympic gold medals and three of the last five Women's World Cups, while the men's team has never won either of these competitions. This case was largely dismissed with the judge noting that the women's team had been offered and rejected the same pay structure as the men's team.

== World conferences ==
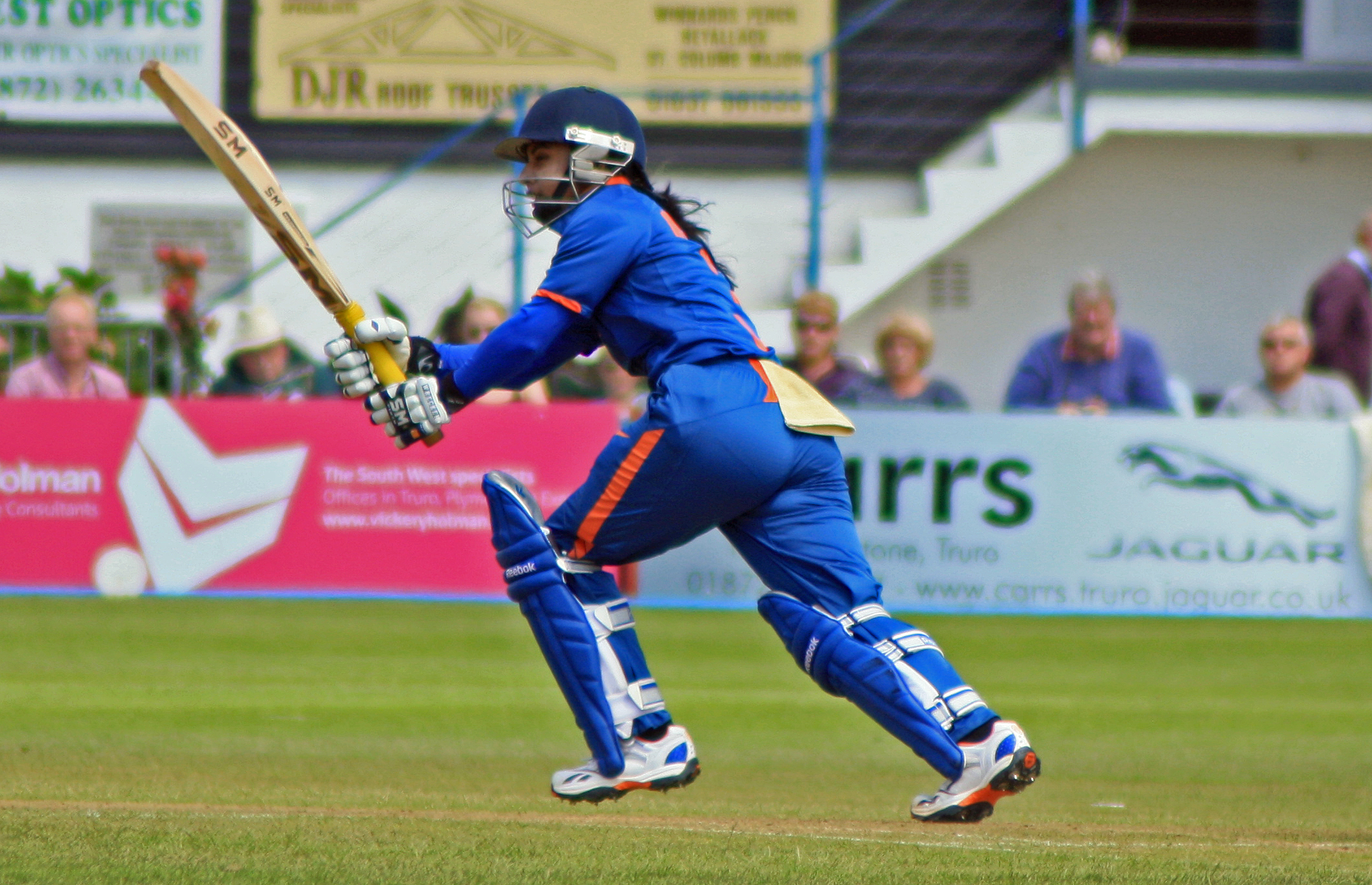
Mithali Raj of India is the only player to surpass the 6,000 run mark in Women's One Day International cricket.

In 1994, the International Working Group on Women and Sport (IWG) organized the first World Conference on Women and Sport in Brighton, United Kingdom, where the Brighton Declaration was published. The IWG hosted further world conferences every four years, with the result of the Windfoek Call for Action (1998), Montreal Tool Kit (2002) and Brighton Plus Helsinki 2014 Declaration (2014). The conferences aim to "develop a sporting culture that enables and values the full involvement of women in every aspect of sport and physical activity", by "increasing the involvement of women in sport at all levels and in all functions and roles".

== Media coverage ==
Compared to men's sports, women´s sports tend to receive significantly less media coverage despite similar performance and marketability. Historical estimates of women's sports coverage have ranged from 3% to 5.5% of total sports coverage. Studies show that less than 25% of all articles in newspapers and online sources about the NCAA Division 1 March Madness tournaments focus on women’s teams. Likewise, female athletes receive less than one-third of high school sports coverage in newspapers. A similar trend is seen in the Olympics, where men’s events continue to receive significantly more attention than women’s.

Research suggests this discrepancy could be attributed to three particular factors that govern sports newswork: the male-dominated sports newsroom; ingrained assumptions about readership; and the systematic, repetitive nature of sports news. In 1989, a study was conducted that recorded and compared the amount of media coverage of women's and men's sports on popular sports commentary shows. Michael Messner and his team in 2010 analyzed three different two-week periods by recording the amount of time that the stories were on air and the content of the stories. After recording sports news and highlights, they wrote a quantitative description of what they saw and a qualitative description of the amount of time that story received.

This unequal media coverage not only sidelines female athletes but also shapes how the public views women’s role in sports. Often, when women in sports get media coverage opportunities they are unrelated to their athletic achievements and instead focused on their physical appearance or personal events. This further neglects their public image as professional athletes while also shaping their public perception, reinforcing the idea that women's sports are less valuable for the population. Additionally, women in sports struggle to gain new exposure, directly impacting their sponsorship and opportunities along with the overall attention given to women´s sports.

Media coverage of women's sports

While great progress has been made in recent years regarding this difference in pay and attention, primarily thanks to the help of social media and the global reach of international competitions, there is still a significantly substantial gap that remains. Thanks to the high-profile female athletes that have emerged in the past years, and these being so successful along with the major tournaments and events helping to promote them, the visibility and audience engagement with female athletes has notably improved in comparison to the past. However, the problem still is present today because consistent and equal media representation between both genders is still lacking, which suggests the need for new structural changes within the sports and media industry.

Another reason for the gap in media coverage is the current structure of the sports industry. Less favorable time slots and less promotion makes it harder for a sport or team or even a gender to attract audiences. This results in overall lower visibility which then leads to lower demand, and these lower demand is then used to justify less coverage which ends up creatinf this neverending cycle. However, with the introduction of newer platforms that don't discrimante, such as social media, these issues are starting to slowly be solved as women’s sports are being given more opportunities to reach audiences directly and thus improve their engagement with the public.

Gender inequality in sports

The issue affecting gender inequality continues to be present in the sports industry today in areas that affect the players directly, such as pay, sponsorship, and media representation.Even when performance and marketability are similar in size and reacheability with other great male athletes, female athletes are usually misrepresented which results in them making significantly lower salaries than male athletes. This difference present in endorsement deals even when marketability is similar demonstrates the inequalities that are imbeded in the system that not only affect the world of sports but also the economic struggles and differences that are seen in many aspects of society.

Furthermore, female athletes face greater backlash when they start to be confronted about their appearance and personality on camera, which often brings shade to their actual performance and media makes it a more important subject than their athletic performance. These affect them not only in their public perception but also in the willingness of brands that are looking for media popularity to promote them and make them marketable. This pattern can be related to long-standing societal gender norms, which even today continue to influence expectations and opportunities not only in the world of sports, but also in the corporate world. Addressing these issues requires greater visibility and a complete shift in how women's sports are given value to and represented.

The inequality is also present in funding and facilities. Women’s teams suffer from fewer resources, which directly affects their performance and development. Moreover, women in coaching positions or executive roles are less common, which means their influence and decision making is affected negatively, which explains why gender gaps in sports continue to exist today.

=== Feminist patriarchal theory ===
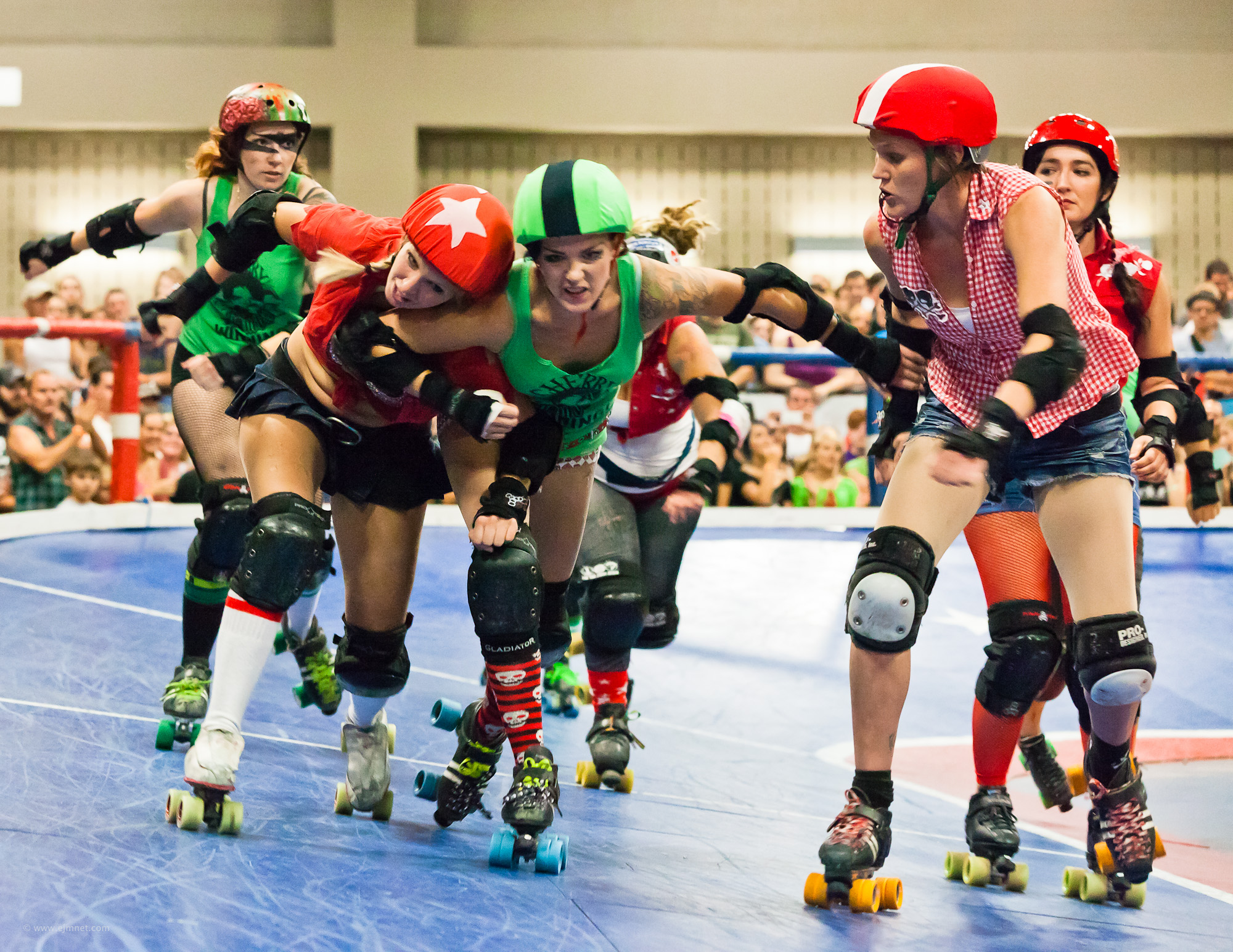
Lonestar Rollergirls in Austin, Texas, play on a banked track (2011) in the sport of Roller derby.

More often than not, modern research in regards to media and women's sport is focused on comparing women's sport with men's sport. Gender feminists in particular consider the lower levels of media representation in women's sport cause for alarm though this view is not shared among all women in sport, with some circles concerned more about increasing female participation itself. While one group maintains that these two factors, participation and media exposure, are inextricably linked, others disagree with this view and do not consider a media agenda or goal to be of importance.

Modern research involving the feminist theory of patriarchy aimed at determining the cause of a perceived lack of media representation is based predominantly upon two driving assumptions: the theory of patriarchy as fact in every case, and the belief that participation in sport by females should also serve a type of feminist agenda in order to be valid.

==== Recent work ====
In the United States, recent work attributed this perceived lack of representation in women's sport to three particular factors that govern sports newswork: the "male-dominated sports newsroom", "ingrained assumptions about readership", and the "systematic, repetitive nature of sports news".

In 1989, a study was conducted that recorded and compared the amount of media coverage of women's and men's sports on popular sports commentary shows. Michael Messner and his team in 2010 analyzed three different two-week periods by recording the amount of time that the stories were on air and the content of the stories. After recording sports news and highlights, they wrote a quantitative description of what they saw and a qualitative description of the amount of time that story received.

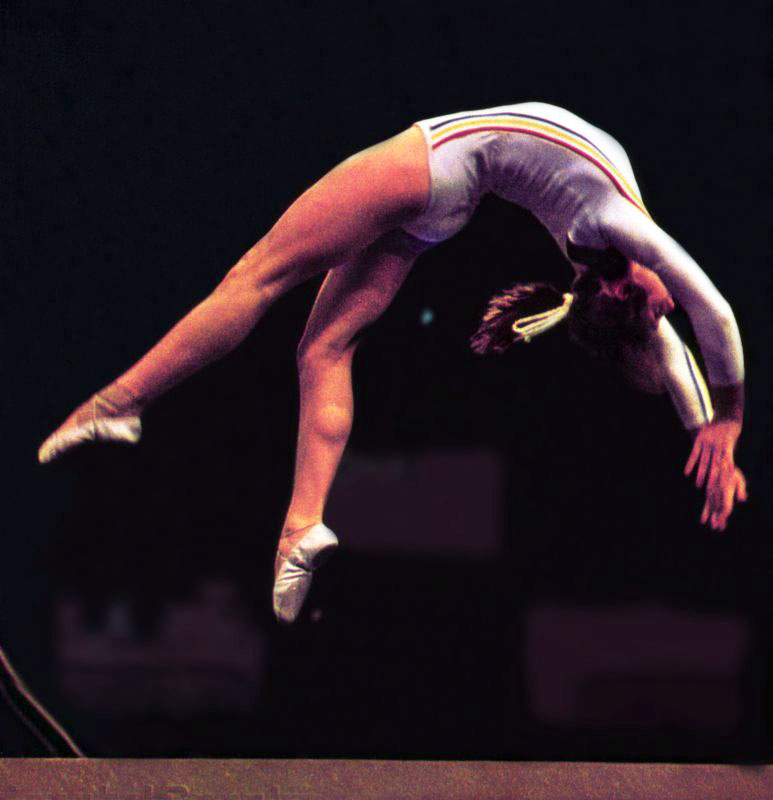
Nadia Comăneci at the 1976 Olympics

During that first year that the research was conducted in 1989, it was recorded that 5% of the sports segments were based on women's sports, compared to the 92% that were based on men's sports and the 3% that was a combination of both. In the late 1900s Women's Sports started to gain popularity in the media because of their talent in the Olympics. In 1999, women's sports coverage reached an all-time high when it was recorded at 8.7%. It maintained its higher percentages until it reached an all-time low in 2009, decreasing to 1.6%. The researchers also measured the amount of time that women's sports were reported in the news ticker, the strip that displays information at the bottom of most news broadcasts. When recorded in 2009, 5% of ticker coverage was based on women's sports, compared to the 95% that was based on men's sports. These percentages were recorded in order to compare the amount of media coverage for each gender.

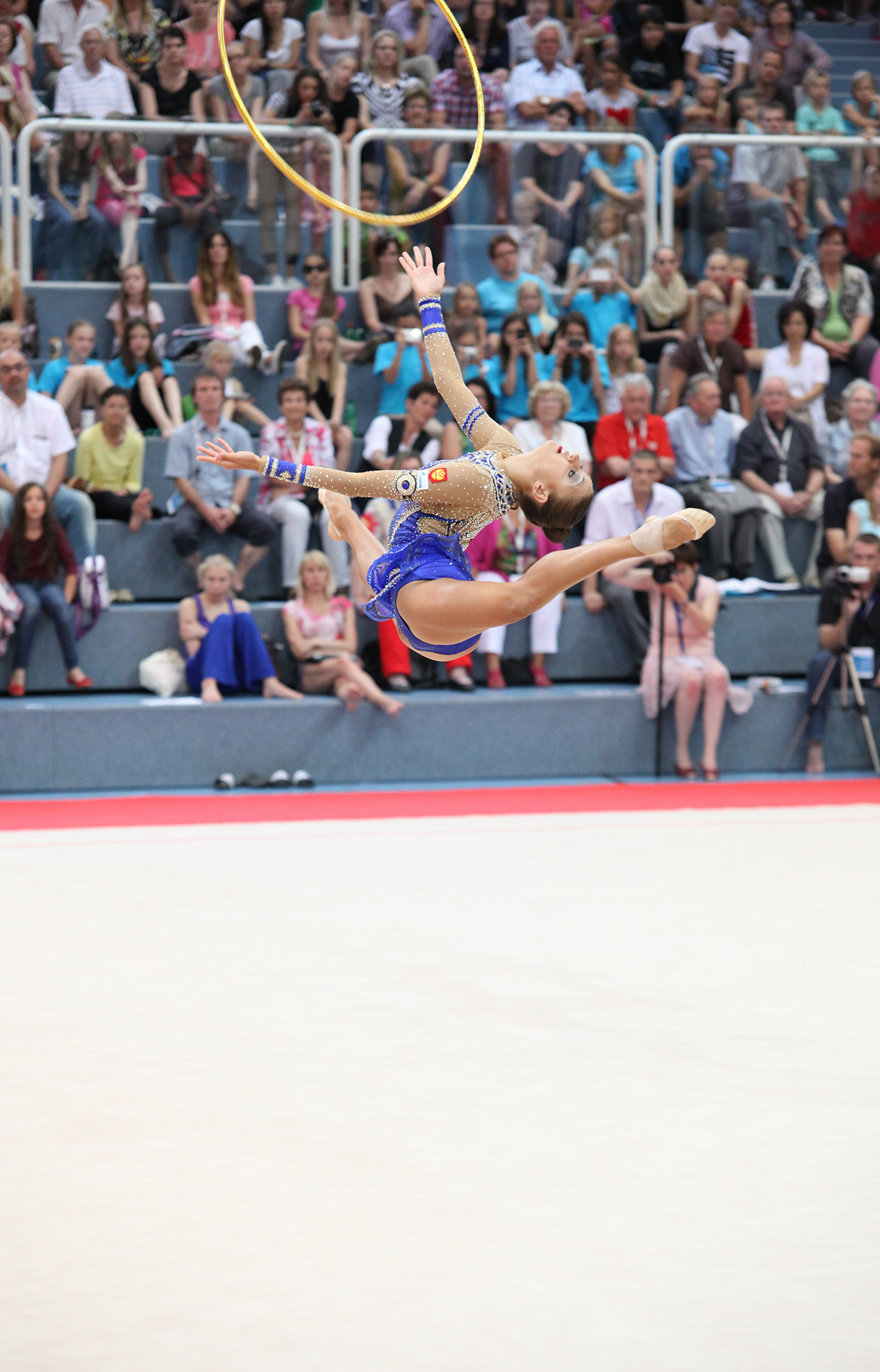
Evgenia Kanaeva doing a Split leap in her hoop routine

When researching the actual amount of time that women's sports stories were mentioned, they focused specifically on differences between the National Basketball Association (NBA) and the Women's National Basketball Association. They recorded two different time periods: when they were in season and when they were off-season. The WNBA had 8 stories, totaling 5:31 minutes, during their season, which was less than the NBA, which had a total of 72 stories, totaling approximately 65:51 minutes. During the off-season, the WNBA did not receive any stories or time on the ticker, while the NBA received a total of 81, which were approximately 50:15 minutes. When compared, the WNBA had a total of 8 stories and 5:31 minutes while the NBA had 153 stories and 1:56:06 hours. A recent study showed that in July, -The NBA summer league receives more coverage and attention than a regular season game in the WNBA. The actual games had several differences in the way the games were presented. The findings were that WNBA games had lower sound quality, more editing mistakes, fewer views of the shot clock and fewer camera angles. There was less verbal commentary and visual statistics about the players throughout the games as well. The quality of the stories has also significantly changed. In past studies, women were sexualized, portrayed as violent, or portrayed as girlfriends, wives and mothers. Female athletes were often included in gag stories that involved sexual dialogue or emphasized their bodies. In Australia, the wives of the men's cricket team members were given more media coverage than the players on the women's cricket team, who also had won more games than the men's rugby team. In 2009, SportsCenter broadcast segments called "Her Story", which was a commentary that highlighted women's athletic careers.

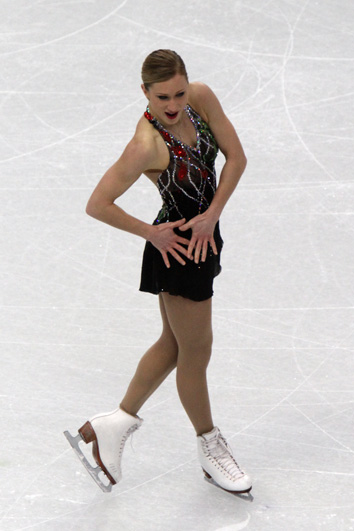
Canadian skater Joannie Rochette at the 2010 Winter Olympics

In newspapers articles, coverage on men's sports once again had a greater number of articles than women's sports in a ratio of 23–1. In 1990, a study was conducted that recorded and compared the amount of media coverage of women's and men's sports on popular newspapers. They analyzed four different sports magazines for three months and recorded the number of women's sports stories that were featured and the content of the stories. Women's sports made up 3.5%, compared to the 81% of men's coverage. The lengths of these articles were 25–27% shorter than the length of men's articles. There was an international frenzy in 2012 when the first woman that represented Saudi Arabia in the 2012 Olympics competed in track. That was the most women's sports coverage that there had been in several years. Women played 90 minutes of football, 80 minutes of rugby, 18 holes of golf and ran the same distance in a marathon as men. Exactly 12 months later, the newspapers returned to featuring 4% of articles on women's sports. This same trend can be seen with regards to the FIFA World Cup. The 2015 Women's World Cup Final had an average of 25.4 million American viewers throughout the duration of the match, and peaked at 30.9 million viewers. It was the most-viewed game of soccer ever in the United States–men's or women's–by a margin of almost 7 million viewers. Despite this jump in viewership of women's soccer in the U.S., television broadcasting of the women's professional soccer league in the U.S. remained much lower than that of the men's league. Fox Sports Network (the company that owns the rights to broadcast the National Women's Soccer League) broadcast 3 regular season NWSL games and 34 Major League Soccer regular-season games during the 2016 seasons. The dearth of coverage of women's sports is evidenced by the low number of segments (i.e., stories) in our sample. Of the 934 local network affiliate news segments (over 12 hr of broadcasts), 880 were on men's sports (or approximately 11½ hr), 22 segments (or nearly 18 min) were on gender-neutral sports (e.g., a horse race, coverage of the Los Angeles [LA] marathon, and a recreational sports event), and only 32 segments (about 23 min) featured women's sports. SportsCenter's numbers were similar. Of the 405 total SportsCenter segments in our sample (nearly 14 hr), 376 covered men's sports (slightly over 13 hr), 16 segments were on gender-neutral sports (just over 20 min), and only 13 segments featured women's sports (approximately 17 min).

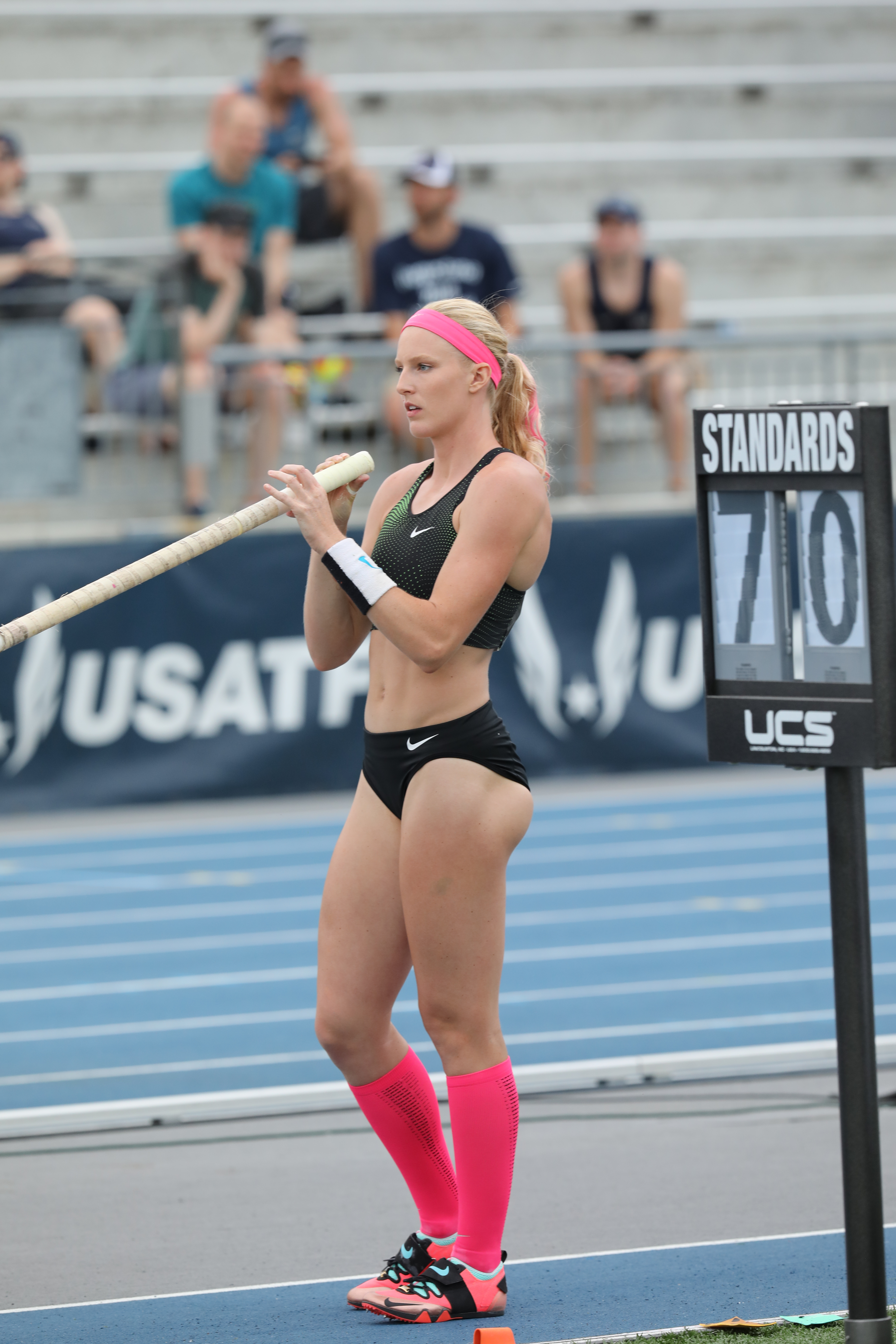
U.S. Olympics medalist Sandi Morris during a pole vault event

A recent article from the Wall Street Journal states "from 2016 to 2018, women's games generated about $50.8 million in revenue compared with $49.9 million for the men, according to U.S. soccer's audited financial statements" (Bachman, 2019). These numbers contrast the idea that women's sports are not entertaining enough for the viewer or typical fan by $1.9 million. This idea stems from the male-dominated sports perspective, which constantly undermines the perception of quality, effort, and potential that women's soccer exhibits. However, we can see through the caliber of women's soccer displayed most recently within the Women's FIFA World Cup of 2019 that it was on par with, if not better than, the level of play of their male counterparts. The U.S. Women's National Team scored 13 goals against Thailand in their opening match, the most goals scored in any World Cup match in history. Media outlets, though, may remain concerned that increased coverage of women's sport will lead to a reduction in audience draw and advertising revenue.

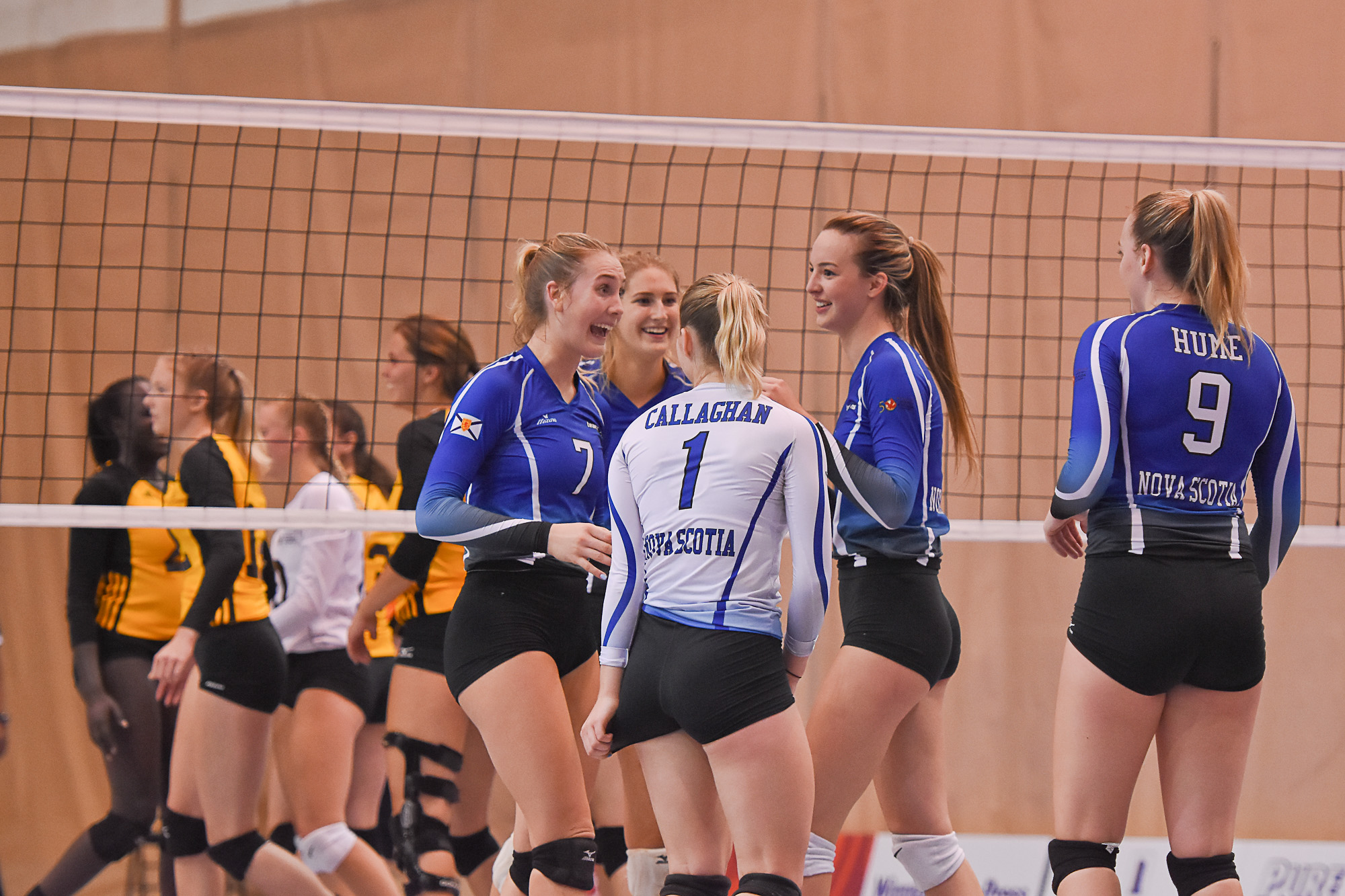
Women's volleyball at Canada Summer Games, 2017

Amy Godoy-Pressland conducted a study that investigated the relationship between sports reporting and gender in Great Britain. She studied Great Britain's newspapers from January 2008 to December 2009 and documented how media coverage of men's sports and women's sports was fairly equal during the Olympics and then altered after the Olympics were over. "Sportswomen are disproportionately under-represented and the sheer quantity and quality of news items on sportsmen demonstrates how male athletes are represented as dominant and superior to females." She also documented how women's bodies were sexualized in photographs and written coverage, noting that the women featured were either nude, semi-nude, or wearing revealing clothing. "The sexualization of sportswomen in Sunday reporting is commonplace and aimed at the mostly male readership. It promotes the idea of female aesthetics over achievements, while the coverage of women not directly involved in sport misrepresents the place of women in sport and inferiorizes real sportswomen's achievements." The media has the ability to create or prevent interest in women's sports. Excluding women's sports from the media makes it much less likely for young girls to have role models that are women athletes. According to Tucker Center for Research on Girls & Women in Sport at the University of Minnesota 40% of all athletes in the United States are women but women's sports only receive about 4% of sports media coverage. This amount of coverage has decreased in the last 20 years although there has been a major increase in women athletes.

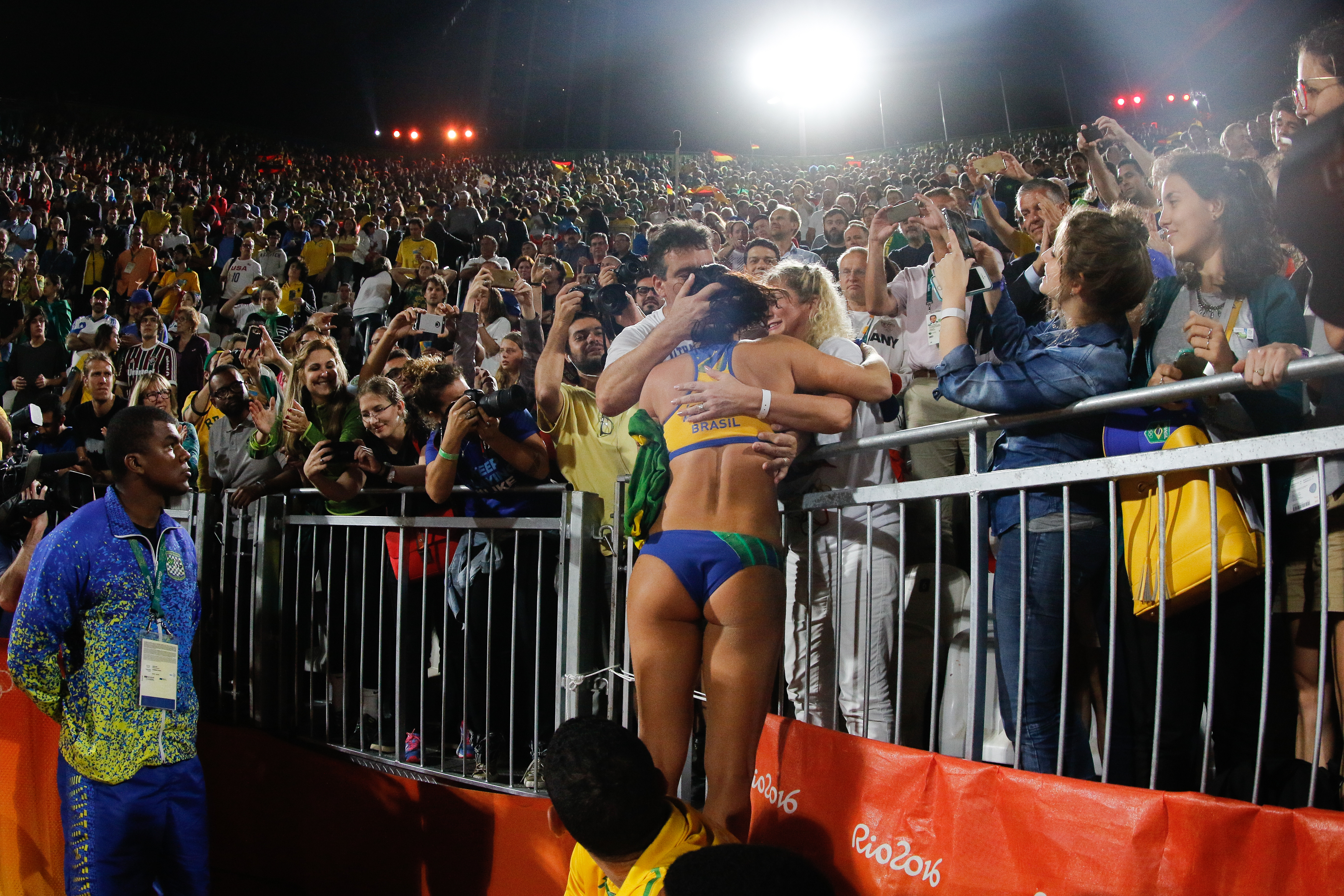
Spectators and media personnel take photos even as Brazil's Ágatha Bednarczuk hugs her support staff after winning a women's beach volleyball match in 2016 Summer Olympics.

Media coverage has slightly increased and this is mostly due to social networking. Social media has further exposed women sports out to the public world, and often at a much greater rate than traditional news media. Traditional media has also improved its coverage of women's sports through more exposure time and using better equipment to record the events. Recent research has shown that in the past twenty years, camera angles, slow motion replays, quality and graphics regarding the presentation of women sports has gradually improved. However, mainstream media still is far behind in its showcasing of female sports in comparison to that of men's. A study has shown that ESPN, which began airing women NCAA tournament in 2003, aired eleven women tournament segments in comparison to one-hundred men's tournament segments. ESPN and other sports outlets are airing more female-oriented sporting events; however the length of the segments are very small. This representative data is showcases a main part of the minimal interaction the media has with women athletes. Media coverage of women sports in the United States has further justified the divisional hierarchy faced by women athletes in terms of popularity and coverage. Scholarly studies (Kane, M. J., LaVoi, N. M., Fink, J. S. (2013) also show that when women athletes were given the option to pick a photo of a picture that would increase respect for their sport, they picked an on-the-court competency picture. However, when women athletes were told to pick a picture that would increase interest in their sport, 47% picked a picture that sexualized the women athlete. The UK is more representative than the United States with the BBC giving women's sports about 20% of their sports coverage (BBC spokesperson). Many women athletes in the UK do not see this as adequate coverage for the 36% of women who participate in sports. NewsChain is the first commercial publisher totally dedicated to women's sport coverage based in the UK.

It is shown that only 5 percent of sports coverage on Sports Center is of women sport.

== Sports equipment for girls and women ==
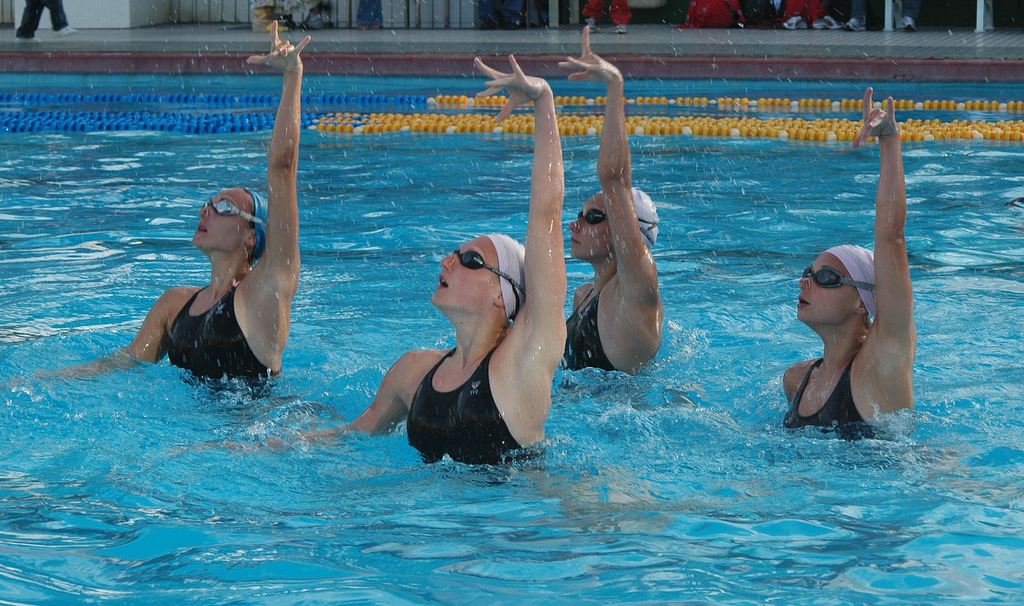
Russian team synchronized swimming. The sport is female-dominated.

Sports equipment designed for the female body is a more recent development in women's and girl's sport. Historically, men's organized sport develops first, often leaving girls and women with the only option of using equipment originally designed for the male body, a common practice to this day. Over time these practices have revealed sports equipment can present design issues for female participants, particularly for those whose participation continues after the onset of puberty. Typically, anatomical differences between male and female bodies do not receive first consideration during the first stage of equipment design since the male body often serves as the base model due to the predominance of male participants and market demand. Women and girls will often use equipment designed for smaller men, or even boys. In some sports these differences are not adversely significant, but can be so in the case of others. Sports equipment can create sizing issues for girls and women and can also affect performance, enjoyment and satisfaction. Designers can also fail to develop equipment made to protective sensitive areas such as female genitalia and the chest area.

=== Sports bra ===
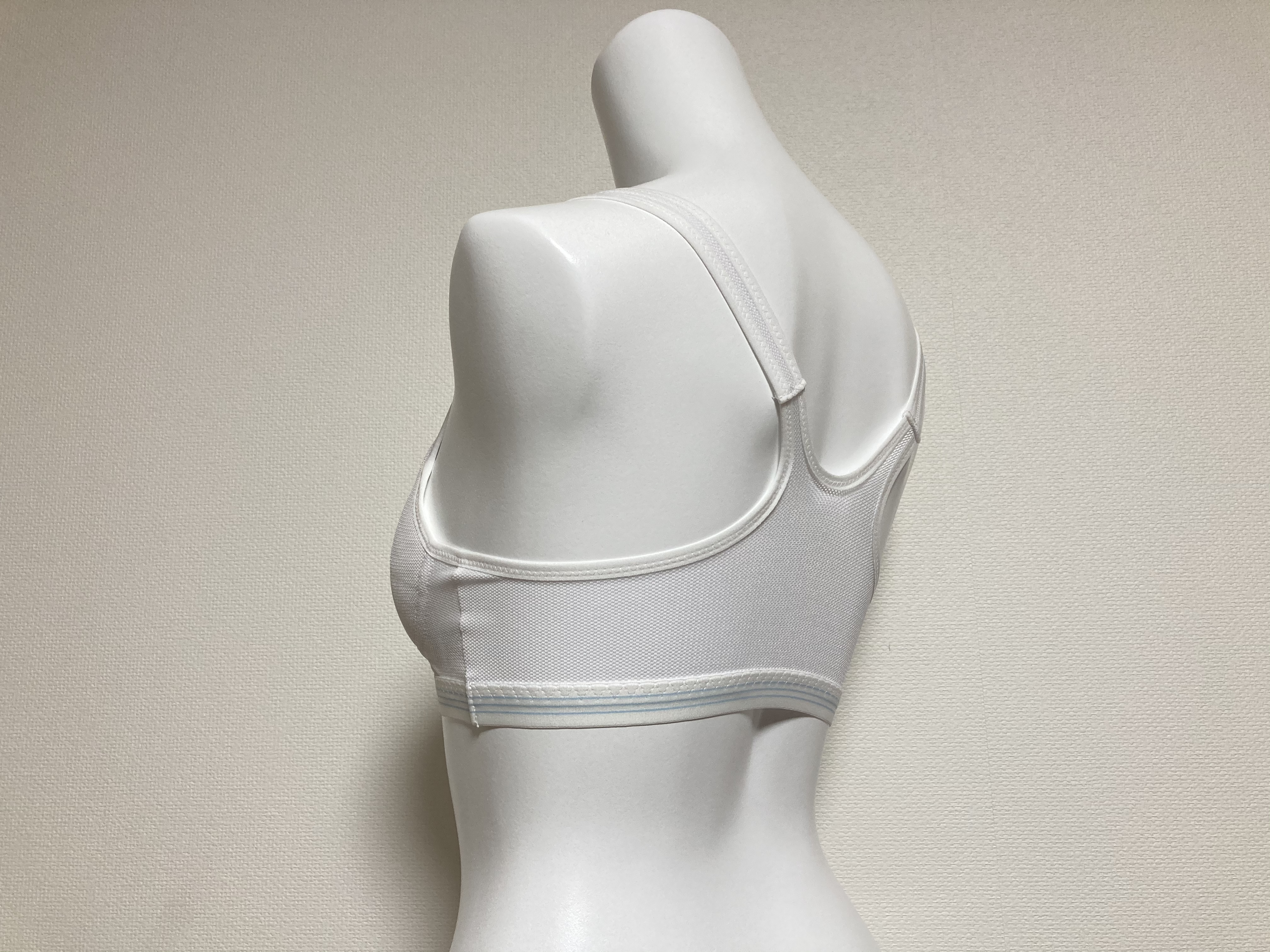
The design of sports bra provides special care for the comfortness of women in sports activities

One important recent development is the sports bra. Commercially available sports bras first came to market in the 1970s. The development of sports bra significantly improves the performance of women in sports activities and offers several benefits that contribute to a more comfortable and efficient sports experience for women. By the research of Norris etal, breast movements show a noticeable drop when women engage in sports activities wearing sports bra and a more stable body contributes to better performance in sports. Sports bra address the physical needs and promote body acceptance of women by providing support, compression, and encapsulation, which allows women to exercise comfortably and safely and symbols women's participation in sports and their right to engage in physical activity without limitations. This can challenge traditional gender stereotypes and contribute to a more inclusive and equitable sporting landscape.

=== Female genital protection ===
Some sports require female players wear a type of female genital protection. The female equivalent of the male jockstrap is the pelvic protector, essentially a jockstrap for females, known colloquially called a "jill" or "jillstrap".

== Sex-specific sports injuries ==
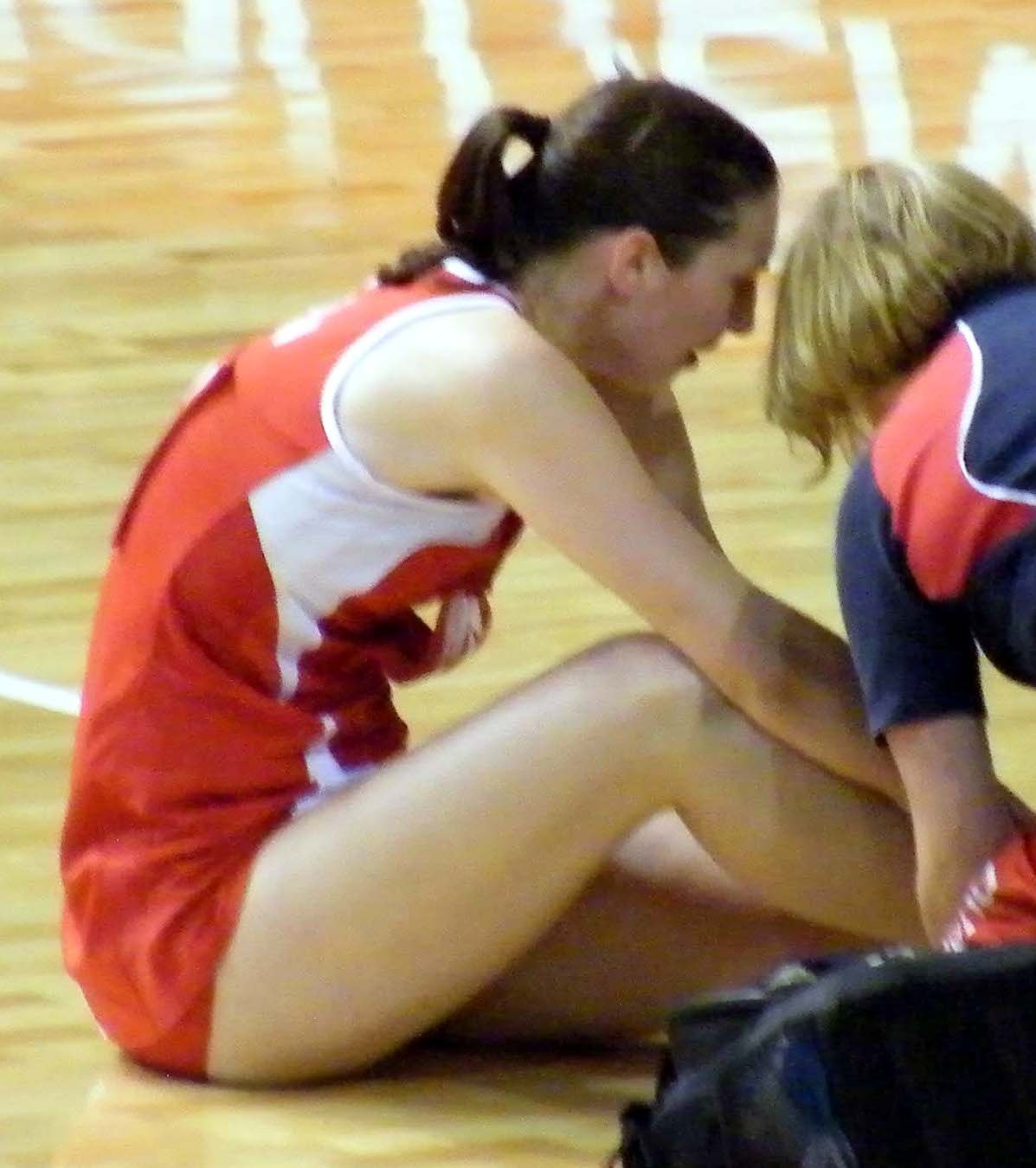
Netball player Rachel Dunn from England with an ankle injury

There are some common sports injuries for which female athletes may be at a higher risk than male athletes.

=== Female Athlete Triad (RED-S) ===
One area of interest involves studying the female athlete triad, a.k.a. "Relative energy deficiency in sport", (RED-S).

=== Knee injuries ===
Several studies have shown that female athletes are more likely to tear their anterior cruciate ligaments (ACLs) than male athletes. According to William Levine, director of sports medicine at Columbia University and the head physician for its varsity teams, female athletes are four or five times more likely than male athletes to have ACL tears.

There are several different theories about why women are more prone to this injury, including the "Q theory" which highlights specific differences in male and female anatomy and kinesiology. The difference in injury risk may be due to female-specific hormonal changes associated with the menstrual cycle, or due to different skeletal and muscular structures (like a wider pelvis, stronger quadriceps than hamstrings, or more elastic ligaments) that cause women to place more stress on and more easily stretch the ACL than men.

=== Concussions ===
Female athletes are also more prone to concussions than male athletes. They exhibit more visible symptoms of a concussion than male athletes and for a longer period of time than male athletes, a phenomenon known as the "concussion gap". However, there is no consensus on the reason women are more prone to concussions than men or experience symptoms differently. Some theories have proposed that women have smaller, more fragile nerve fibers in their brains, that their necks are weaker and so their brains accelerate more sharply on impact, or fluctuating hormones during menstrual cycles that make them more susceptible.

== Attendances ==
The 2024-25 and 2025 seasons for women's professional sports leagues saw several clubs attract average home league attendances of at least 10,000:

#	Club	Country	Sport	League	Average
1	Arsenal	United Kingdom	Association football	WSL	28,808
2	Portland Thorns	United States	Association football	NWSL	18,173
3	Golden State Valkyries	United States	Basketball	WNBA	18,064
4	Indiana Fever	United States	Basketball	WNBA	16,560
5	Angel City	United States	Association football	NWSL	16,257
6	Washington Spirit	United States	Association football	NWSL	15,259
7	Bay FC	United States	Association football	NWSL	14,823
8	San Diego Wave	United States	Association football	NWSL	13,427
9	Los Angeles Sparks	United States	Basketball	WNBA	12,441
10	Seattle Storm	United States	Basketball	WNBA	11,835
11	Las Vegas Aces	United States	Basketball	WNBA	11,553
12	Kansas City Current	United States	Association football	NWSL	11,500
13	Phoenix Mercury	United States	Basketball	WNBA	11,306

== See also ==
- Women's professional sports
- Fairness in Women's Sports Act
- Mixed-sex sports
- Sportswear
- Sex verification in sports
- Timeline of women's sports
- Women's Sports Foundation
- Major women's sport leagues in North America
- WTSN (TV channel)
- Misogyny in sports
- Participation of women in the Olympics
- Sportswear (activewear)
- Legends Football League
- Cheerleading
- Women in WWE
- Janet Guthrie
- Rayon Sportif Féminin
- Sexualization of women athletes in sports broadcasting
