= List of flag bearers for Tajikistan at the Olympics =

Tajikistan at the Olympics
- IOC code: TJK
- NOC: National Olympic Committee of the Republic of Tajikistan
- Website: www.olympic.tj (in Tajik)
- Medals: Gold 1 Silver 1 Bronze 5 Total 7

Summer appearances
- 1996; 2000; 2004; 2008; 2012; 2016; 2020; 2024

Winter appearances
- 2002; 2006; 2010; 2014; 2018–2026

Other related appearances
- Russian Empire (1900–1912); Soviet Union (1952–1988); Unified Team (1992)

This is a list of flag bearers who have represented Tajikistan at the Olympics.

Flag bearers carry the national flag of their country at the opening ceremony of the Olympic Games.

#	Event year	Season	Flag bearer	Sport
1	1996	Summer	Andrey Abduvaliyev	Athletics (did not compete)
2	2000	Summer	Khurshed Hasanov	Boxing (did not compete)
3	2002	Winter	Gafar Mirzoyev	Official
4	2004	Summer	Nargis Nabieva	Archery
5	2006	Winter	Andrey Drygin	Alpine skiing
6	2008	Summer	Dilshod Nazarov	Athletics
7	2010	Winter	Alisher Kudratov	Alpine skiing (did not compete)
8	2012	Summer	Mavzuna Chorieva	Boxing
9	2014	Winter	Alisher Kudratov	Alpine skiing
10	2016	Summer	Dilshod Nazarov	Athletics
11	2020	Summer	Temur Rakhimov	Judo
12	2024	Summer	Temur Rakhimov	Judo
12	2024	Summer	Mijgona Samadova	Boxing

== See also ==
- Tajikistan at the Olympics
