= 2007 World Wrestling Championships – Women's freestyle 48 kg =

Women's freestyle 48 kg at the 2007 World Championships
- Venue: Heydar Aliyev Sports and Concert Complex
- Dates: 21 September 2007
- Competitors: 38 from 38 nations

Medalists
gold medal	Chiharu Icho	Japan
silver medal	Iryna Merleni	Ukraine
bronze medal	Mayelis Caripá	Venezuela
bronze medal	Li Xiaomei	China

The women's freestyle 48 kilograms is a competition featured at the 2007 World Wrestling Championships, and was held at the Heydar Aliyev Sports and Concert Complex in Baku, Azerbaijan on 21 September 2007.

== Results ==
Legend

- F — Won by fall

=== Finals ===
Semifinals			Final
Mayelis Caripá (VEN)	0
Iryna Merleni (UKR)	7^{F}		Iryna Merleni (UKR)	0	1	0
Li Xiaomei (CHN)	0	0	Chiharu Icho (JPN)	1	0	2
Chiharu Icho (JPN)	1	1

=== Top half ===
==== Section 1 ====
Round of 64

Round of 32
Kyla Bremner (AUS)	2	3	2
Sarianne Savola (FIN)	3	2	1
Mayelis Caripá (VEN)	3	1
Iwona Sadowska (POL)	0	0
Francine De Paola (ITA)	1	1
Hannah Askren (ISR)	0	0
Guadalupe Pérez (MEX)	0
Sofia Mattsson (SWE)	3^{F}

Round of 16
Kyla Bremner (AUS)	0	2
Mayelis Caripá (VEN)	6	9^{F}
Francine De Paola (ITA)	2	0
Sofia Mattsson (SWE)	4	1

Quarterfinals
Mayelis Caripá (VEN)	4^{F}
Sofia Mattsson (SWE)	0

==== Section 2 ====
Round of 64

Round of 32
Nirmala Devi (IND)	0
Lilia Kaskarakova (RUS)	7^{F}
Liliya Shakirova (UZB)	0
Carol Huynh (CAN)	7^{F}
Katiuska Toaza (ECU)	0
Iryna Merleni (UKR)	6^{F}
Sara Sánchez (ESP)	2	1
Olena Bondarenko (NZL)	1	0

Round of 16
Lilia Kaskarakova (RUS)	0	0
Carol Huynh (CAN)	3	1
Iryna Merleni (UKR)	6^{F}
Sara Sánchez (ESP)	0

Quarterfinals
Carol Huynh (CAN)	0	0
Iryna Merleni (UKR)	4	1

=== Bottom half ===
==== Section 3 ====
Round of 64

Round of 32
Wu Li-chuan (TPE)	1	1
Julieta Okot (BUL)	0	0
Li Xiaomei (CHN)	6	6
Wassila Rawafi (TUN)	2	0
Vanessa Boubryemm (FRA)	6	1
Mona Samir (EGY)	0	1
Yuliana Alzate (COL)	0	4^{F}
Rebecca Muambo (CMR)	2	2

Round of 16
Wu Li-chuan (TPE)	0	0
Li Xiaomei (CHN)	1	7
Vanessa Boubryemm (FRA)	5	5^{F}
Yuliana Alzate (COL)	0	0

Quarterfinals
Li Xiaomei (CHN)	3	3	5^{F}
Vanessa Boubryemm (FRA)	3	0	0

==== Section 4 ====
Round of 64
Stephanie Murata (USA)	1	7
Natalia Budu (MDA)	0	0
Chiharu Icho (JPN)	2	3
Isabelle Sambou (SEN)	0	0
Brigitte Wagner (GER)	2	2
Yuliya Staravoitava (BLR)	1	0
Lê Thị Trang (VIE)	4	6
Íngrid Medrano (ESA)	3	0
Tsogtbazaryn Enkhjargal (MGL)	1	0
Kim Hyung-joo (KOR)	3	1
Cristina Croitoru (ROU)	0	0
Mariya Stadnik (AZE)	6	4

Round of 32
Zhuldyz Eshimova (KAZ)	2	1
Fani Psatha (GRE)	0	0
Stephanie Murata (USA)	0	0
Chiharu Icho (JPN)	1	1
Brigitte Wagner (GER)	6	1
Lê Thị Trang (VIE)	0	0
Kim Hyung-joo (KOR)	0	0
Mariya Stadnik (AZE)	2	7

Round of 16
Zhuldyz Eshimova (KAZ)	0	0
Chiharu Icho (JPN)	1	6
Brigitte Wagner (GER)	0	2
Mariya Stadnik (AZE)	1	3

Quarterfinals
Chiharu Icho (JPN)	0	1	1
Mariya Stadnik (AZE)	1	1	1

=== Repechage ===
Repechage round 1
Isabelle Sambou (SEN)	2	1
Stephanie Murata (USA)	3	2

Repechage round 2
Katiuska Toaza (ECU)	1	0
Sara Sánchez (ESP)	1	2
Stephanie Murata (USA)	4^{F}
Zhuldyz Eshimova (KAZ)	0

Repechage round 3
Sara Sánchez (ESP)	3	0
Carol Huynh (CAN)	5	2
Stephanie Murata (USA)	2	1
Mariya Stadnik (AZE)	1	1

Bronze medals
Carol Huynh (CAN)	4	1	1
Mayelis Caripá (VEN)	3	4	1
Stephanie Murata (USA)	1	0	0
Li Xiaomei (CHN)	0	1	2

- Mariya Stadnik of Azerbaijan originally finished 7th, but later the CAS decided that all results obtained by her between 26 April 2006 and 25 April 2008 must be disqualified.
