= Tajikistan at the 2004 Summer Olympics =

- IOC code: TJK
- NOC: National Olympic Committee of the Republic of Tajikistan
- Website: www.olympic.tj (in Tajik)

in Athens
- Competitors: 9 in 5 sports
- Flag bearer: Nargis Nabieva
- Medals: Gold 0 Silver 0 Bronze 0 Total 0

Summer Olympics appearances (overview)
- 1996; 2000; 2004; 2008; 2012; 2016; 2020; 2024; 2028

Other related appearances
- Russian Empire (1900–1912); Soviet Union (1952–1988); Unified Team (1992)

Tajikistan was represented at the 2004 Summer Olympics in Athens, Greece by the National Olympic Committee of the Republic of Tajikistan.

In total, nine athletes including five men and four women represented Tajikistan in five different sports including archery, athletics, boxing, shooting and wrestling.

== Competitors ==
In total, nine athletes represented Tajikistan at the 2004 Summer Olympics in Athens, Greece across five different sports.

Sport	Men	Women	Total
Archery	0	1	1
Athletics	1	1	2
Boxing	1	—	1
Shooting	1	0	1
Wrestling	2	2	4
Total	5	4	9

== Archery ==
In total, one Tajikistani athlete participated in the archery events – Nargis Nabieva in the women's individual.

The archery events took place at the Panathenaic Stadium in Pangrati, Athens from 15 to 21 August 2004.

Athlete	Event	Ranking round		Round of 64	Round of 32	Round of 16	Quarterfinals	Semifinals	Final / BM	
Athlete	Event	Score	Seed	Opposition Score	Opposition Score	Opposition Score	Opposition Score	Opposition Score	Opposition Score	Rank
Nargis Nabieva	Women's individual	600	55	Wu H-J (TPE); L 142–156	did not advance					

== Athletics ==
In total, two Tajikistani athletes participated in the athletics events – Gulsara Dadabaeva in the women's marathon and Dilshod Nazarov in the men's hammer throw.

Most of the athletics events took place at the Athens Olympic Stadium in Marousi, Athens from 18 to 29 August 2004. The men's and women's marathons took place at the Panathenaic Stadium in Pangrati, Athens.

Men

Athlete	Event	Qualification		Final	
Athlete	Event	Distance	Position	Distance	Position
Dilshod Nazarov	Hammer throw	NM	—	did not advance	

Women

Athlete	Event	Final	
Athlete	Event	Result	Rank
Gulsara Dadabaeva	Marathon	2:50:45	53

== Boxing ==
In total, one Tajikistani athlete participated in the boxing events – Sherali Dostiev in the light flyweight category.

The boxing events took place at the Peristeri Olympic Boxing Hall in Peristeri, Athens from 14 to 29 August 2004.

Athlete	Event	Round of 32	Round of 16	Quarterfinals	Semifinals	Final	
Athlete	Event	Opposition Result	Opposition Result	Opposition Result	Opposition Result	Opposition Result	Rank
Sherali Dostiev	Light flyweight	Tanamor (PHI); L 12–17	did not advance				

== Shooting ==
In total, one Tajikistani athlete participated in the shooting events – Sergey Babikov in the men's 10 m air pistol.

The shooting events took place at the Markopoulo Olympic Shooting Centre in Markopoulo Mesogaias, East Attica from 9 to 17 August 2004.

Athlete	Event	Qualification		Final	
Athlete	Event	Points	Rank	Points	Rank
Sergey Babikov	10 m air pistol	581	10	did not advance	

== Wrestling ==
In total, four Tajikistani athletes participated in the wrestling events – Yusup Abdusalomov in the men's freestyle −74 kg category, Shamil Aliev in the men's freestyle −84 kg category, Natalia Ivanova in the women's freestyle −63 kg and Lidiya Karamchakova in the women's freestyle −48 kg.

The wrestling events took place at the Ano Liosia Olympic Hall in Ano Liosia, Athens from 22 to 29 August 2004.

Men

Athlete	Event	Elimination Pool				Quarterfinal	Semifinal	Final / BM	
Athlete	Event	Opposition Result	Opposition Result	Opposition Result	Rank	Opposition Result	Opposition Result	Opposition Result	Rank
Yusup Abdusalomov	−74 kg	Aslanov (AZE); W 3–1 ^{PP}	Igali (CAN); L 1–3 ^{PP}	—N/a	2	did not advance			9
Shamil Aliev	−84 kg	Ghiţă (ROM); W 3–1 ^{PP}	Sène (SEN); W 3–1 ^{PP}	Sazhidov (RUS); L 0–3 ^{PO}	2	did not advance			8

Women

Athlete	Event	Elimination Pool				Classification	Semifinal	Final / BM	
Athlete	Event	Opposition Result	Opposition Result	Opposition Result	Rank	Opposition Result	Opposition Result	Opposition Result	Rank
Lidiya Karamchakova	−48 kg	Merleni (UKR); L 0–4 ^{ST}	Psatha (GRE); W 3–1 ^{PP}	Louati (TUN); W 5–0 ^{VT}	2	Oorzhak (RUS); L 0–4 ^{ST}	did not advance		7
Natalia Ivanova	−63 kg	Khilko (BLR); L 1–3 ^{PP}	Legrand (FRA); L 0–3 ^{PO}	—N/a	3	did not advance			11

== See also ==
- Tajikistan at the 2002 Asian Games
- Tajikistan at the 2004 Summer Paralympics
