= 2006 World Wrestling Championships – Women's freestyle 51 kg =

Women's freestyle 51 kg at the 2006 World Championships
- Venue: Tianhe Gymnasium
- Dates: 30 September 2006
- Competitors: 20 from 20 nations

Medalists
gold medal	Hitomi Sakamoto	Japan
silver medal	Lyndsay Belisle	Canada
bronze medal	Patricia Miranda	United States
bronze medal	Alena Adashinskaya	Russia

The women's freestyle 51 kilograms is a competition featured at the 2006 World Wrestling Championships, and was held at the Tianhe Gymnasium in Guangzhou, China on 30 September 2006.

This freestyle wrestling competition consists of a single-elimination tournament, with a repechage used to determine the winner of two bronze medals.

== Results ==
Legend

- F — Won by fall
- WO — Won by walkover

=== Final ===
Final
Hitomi Sakamoto (JPN)	4	4
Lyndsay Belisle (CAN)	0	0

=== Top half ===
Round of 32

Round of 16
Marta Podedworna (POL)	0	0
Patricia Miranda (USA)	5	6
Bekzat Mustafina (KAZ)	0	0
Hitomi Sakamoto (JPN)	6	6
Juliette Willocq (FRA)	1	0
Oleksandra Kohut (UKR)	3	1
Yuragiin Gandolgor (MGL)	0	0
Liao Donghua (CHN)	3	6

Quarterfinals
Patricia Miranda (USA)	0	0
Hitomi Sakamoto (JPN)	3	2
Oleksandra Kohut (UKR)	6	3^{F}
Liao Donghua (CHN)	3	1

Semifinals
Hitomi Sakamoto (JPN)	4	8
Oleksandra Kohut (UKR)	0	0

=== Bottom half ===
Round of 32
Dinara Mirzaeva (UZB)	3	1
Cristina Villanueva (PHI)	0	0
Neha Rathi (IND)	1	0
Park Yeon-jin (KOR)	2	1
Phạm Thị Huệ (VIE)	1	1
Alena Adashinskaya (RUS)	4	1
Sriprapa Thokaew (THA)	0
Lyndsay Belisle (CAN)	7^{F}

Round of 16
Tatsiana Hryhoryeva (BLR)	0	1
Brigitte Wagner (GER)	1	4
Viktoria Kalandarova (KGZ)	1	1
María del Mar Serrano (ESP)	1	1
Dinara Mirzaeva (UZB)	5	3	0
Park Yeon-jin (KOR)	0	4	1
Alena Adashinskaya (RUS)	0
Lyndsay Belisle (CAN)	7^{F}

Quarterfinals
Brigitte Wagner (GER)	4^{F}
María del Mar Serrano (ESP)	0
Park Yeon-jin (KOR)	0	0
Lyndsay Belisle (CAN)	6	3^{F}

Semifinals
Brigitte Wagner (GER)	0	0
Lyndsay Belisle (CAN)	1	2

=== Repechage ===
Repechage round 1
Sriprapa Thokaew (THA)	0	0
Alena Adashinskaya (RUS)	6	3^{F}

Repechage round 2
Bekzat Mustafina (KAZ)
Patricia Miranda (USA)	W	O
Alena Adashinskaya (RUS)	4^{F}
Park Yeon-jin (KOR)	0

Bronze medals
Patricia Miranda (USA)	1	1
Oleksandra Kohut (UKR)	0	0
Alena Adashinskaya (RUS)	4^{F}
Brigitte Wagner (GER)	0
