= 2002 World Wrestling Championships – Women's freestyle 48 kg =

Women's freestyle 48 kg at the 2002 World Championships
- Venue: Tasos Kampouris Hall
- Dates: 2–3 November 2002
- Competitors: 26 from 26 nations

Medalists
gold medal	Brigitte Wagner	Germany
silver medal	Inga Karamchakova	Russia
bronze medal	Ida Hellström	Sweden

The women's freestyle 48 kilograms is a competition featured at the 2002 World Wrestling Championships, and was held at the Tasos Kampouris Hall in Chalcis, Greece from 2 to 3 November 2002.

== Results ==
Legend

- F — Won by fall

=== Preliminary round ===
==== Pool 1 ====
Pos	Athlete	Pld	W	L	CP	TP	RUS	POL	KOR
1	Inga Karamchakova (RUS)	2	2	0	8	11	—	6–0 Fall	5–0 Fall
2	Iwona Matkowska (POL)	2	1	1	3	3	0–4 TO	—	3–0
3	Park Ji-young (KOR)	2	0	2	0	0	0–4 TO	0–3 PO	—

Source: Japan Wrestling

==== Pool 2 ====
Pos	Athlete	Pld	W	L	CP	TP	VEN	NOR	BUL
1	Mayelis Caripá (VEN)	2	2	0	7	13	—	3–0	10–0 Fall
2	Nora Lauvstad (NOR)	2	1	1	3	7	0–3 PO	—	7–1
3	Vladislava Petrova (BUL)	2	0	2	1	1	0–4 TO	1–3 PP	—

Source: Japan Wrestling

==== Pool 3 ====
Pos	Athlete	Pld	W	L	CP	TP	SWE	USA	MGL
1	Ida Hellström (SWE)	2	2	0	7	8	—	3–2	6–0 Fall
2	Patricia Miranda (USA)	2	1	1	5	15	1–3 PP	—	13–1
3	Tsogtbazaryn Enkhjargal (MGL)	2	0	2	1	1	0–4 TO	1–4 SP	—

Source: Japan Wrestling

==== Pool 4 ====
Pos	Athlete	Pld	W	L	CP	TP	CAN	UKR	IND
1	Carol Huynh (CAN)	2	2	0	6	10	—	4–0	6–2
2	Inessa Rebar (UKR)	2	1	1	3	8	0–3 PO	—	8–0
3	Kamini Yadav (IND)	2	0	2	1	2	1–3 PP	0–3 PO	—

Source: Japan Wrestling

==== Pool 5 ====
Pos	Athlete	Pld	W	L	CP	TP	GER	JPN	CHN
1	Brigitte Wagner (GER)	2	1	1	5	12	—	4–6	8–4 Fall
2	Mika Noguchi (JPN)	2	1	1	4	7	3–1 PP	—	1–6
3	Li Hui (CHN)	2	1	1	3	10	0–4 TO	3–1 PP	—

Source: Japan Wrestling

==== Pool 6 ====
Pos	Athlete	Pld	W	L	CP	TP	FRA	BLR	SUI
1	Laurianne Mary (FRA)	2	2	0	7	11	—	8–0	3–0 Fall
2	Tatsiana Kalesnikava (BLR)	2	1	1	3	8	0–3 PO	—	8–2
3	Karin Wild (SUI)	2	0	2	1	2	0–4 TO	1–3 PP	—

Source: Japan Wrestling

==== Pool 7 ====
Pos	Athlete	Pld	W	L	CP	TP	MEX	GRE	ESP	AUS
1	María Barraza (MEX)	3	3	0	12	20	—	7–6 Fall	7–0 Fall	6–7 Fall
2	Myrsini Koloni (GRE)	3	2	1	6	16	0–4 TO	—	6–0	4–1
3	Alicia Abuja (ESP)	3	1	2	4	4	0–4 TO	0–3 PO	—	4–1 Fall
4	Lila Ristevska (AUS)	3	0	3	1	9	0–4 TO	1–3 PP	0–4 TO	—

Source: Japan Wrestling

==== Pool 8 ====
Pos	Athlete	Pld	W	L	CP	TP	ROU	PER	ITA	TUR
1	Nicoleta Badea (ROM)	3	3	0	9	16	—	5–4	5–0	6–1
2	Flor Quispe (PER)	3	2	1	8	22	1–3 PP	—	7–0 Fall	11–5
3	Annalisa Debiasi (ITA)	3	1	2	4	8	0–3 PO	0–4 TO	—	8–0 Fall
4	Ayşe Güneri (TUR)	3	0	3	2	6	1–3 PP	1–3 PP	0–4 TO	—

Source: Japan Wrestling

=== Knockout round ===
Quarterfinals
Inga Karamchakova (RUS)	4^{F}
Mayelis Caripá (VEN)	0
Ida Hellström (SWE)	4
Carol Huynh (CAN)	3
Brigitte Wagner (GER)	6
Laurianne Mary (FRA)	1
María Barraza (MEX)	0
Nicoleta Badea (ROM)	4^{F}

Semifinals
Inga Karamchakova (RUS)	8
Ida Hellström (SWE)	5
Brigitte Wagner (GER)	5^{F}
Nicoleta Badea (ROM)	0

Final
Inga Karamchakova (RUS)	3
Brigitte Wagner (GER)	4
Bronze medal match
Ida Hellström (SWE)	3^{F}
Nicoleta Badea (ROM)	0
