= 2001 World Wrestling Championships – Women's freestyle 46 kg =

Women's freestyle 46 kg at the 2001 World Championships
- Venue: Winter Sports Palace
- Dates: 22–24 November 2001
- Competitors: 16 from 16 nations

Medalists
gold medal	Iryna Melnik	Ukraine
silver medal	Carol Huynh	Canada
bronze medal	Brigitte Wagner	Germany

The women's freestyle 46 kilograms is a competition featured at the 2001 World Wrestling Championships, and was held at the Winter Sports Palace in Sofia, Bulgaria from 22 to 24 November 2001.

== Results ==
Legend

- F — Won by fall

=== Preliminary round ===
==== Pool 1 ====
Pos	Athlete	Pld	W	L	CP	TP	JPN	TUR	USA
1	Misato Shimizu (JPN)	2	2	0	7	16	—	13–0 Fall	3–2
2	Ayşe Güneri (TUR)	2	1	1	4	0	0–4 TO	—	WO
3	Tricia Saunders (USA)	2	0	2	1	2	1–3 PP	0–4 PA	—

Source: Official website

==== Pool 2 ====
Pos	Athlete	Pld	W	L	CP	TP	GER	BLR	CZE
1	Brigitte Wagner (GER)	2	2	0	8	21	—	10–0	11–0
2	Volha Prydanikava (BLR)	2	1	1	4	3	0–4 ST	—	3–0 Fall
3	Olina Orlovská (CZE)	2	0	2	0	0	0–4 ST	0–4 TO	—

Source: Official website

==== Pool 3 ====
Pos	Athlete	Pld	W	L	CP	TP	UKR	RUS	CHN
1	Iryna Melnik (UKR)	2	2	0	6	14	—	7–2	7–3
2	Inga Karamchakova (RUS)	2	1	1	4	7	1–3 PP	—	5–1
3	Cui Ying (CHN)	2	0	2	2	4	1–3 PP	1–3 PP	—

Source: Official website

==== Pool 4 ====
Pos	Athlete	Pld	W	L	CP	TP	CAN	BUL	VEN
1	Carol Huynh (CAN)	2	2	0	6	14	—	5–2	9–8
2	Kamelia Tzekova (BUL)	2	1	1	4	10	1–3 PP	—	8–4
3	Mayelis Caripá (VEN)	2	0	2	2	12	1–3 PP	1–3 PP	—

Source: Official website

==== Pool 5 ====
Pos	Athlete	Pld	W	L	CP	TP	FRA	GRE	MGL	POL
1	Farah Touchi (FRA)	3	3	0	10	20	—	3–2	9–5 Fall	8–1
2	Agoro Papavasileiou (GRE)	3	2	1	8	21	1–3 PP	—	9–8 Fall	10–6
3	Tsogtbazaryn Enkhjargal (MGL)	3	1	2	3	20	0–4 TO	0–4 TO	—	7–3
4	Katarzyna Zalewska (POL)	3	0	3	3	10	1–3 PP	1–3 PP	1–3 PP	—

Source: Official website

=== Knockout round ===
Quarterfinals
Misato Shimizu (JPN)	2
Brigitte Wagner (GER)	12^{F}

Semifinals
Brigitte Wagner (GER)	1
Iryna Melnik (UKR)	5
Carol Huynh (CAN)	6
Farah Touchi (FRA)	0

Final
Iryna Melnik (UKR)	3
Carol Huynh (CAN)	0
Bronze medal match
Brigitte Wagner (GER)	4
Farah Touchi (FRA)	2
