= Tajikistan at the 2010 Winter Olympics =

- IOC code: TJK
- NOC: National Olympic Committee of the Republic of Tajikistan
- Website: www.olympic.tj (in Tajik)

in Vancouver
- Competitors: 1 in 1 sport
- Flag bearer: Alisher Kudratov
- Medals: Gold 0 Silver 0 Bronze 0 Total 0

Winter Olympics appearances (overview)
- 2002; 2006; 2010; 2014; 2018–2022; 2026; 2030

Other related appearances
- Soviet Union (1956–1988)

Tajikistan sent a delegation to compete at the 2010 Winter Olympics in Vancouver, British Columbia, Canada from 12–28 February 2010. The nation was participating in its third Winter Olympic Games. The Tajikistani delegation consisted of a single athlete: alpine skier Andrei Drygin. Drygin's best finish in any of his events was 44th in the super-G.

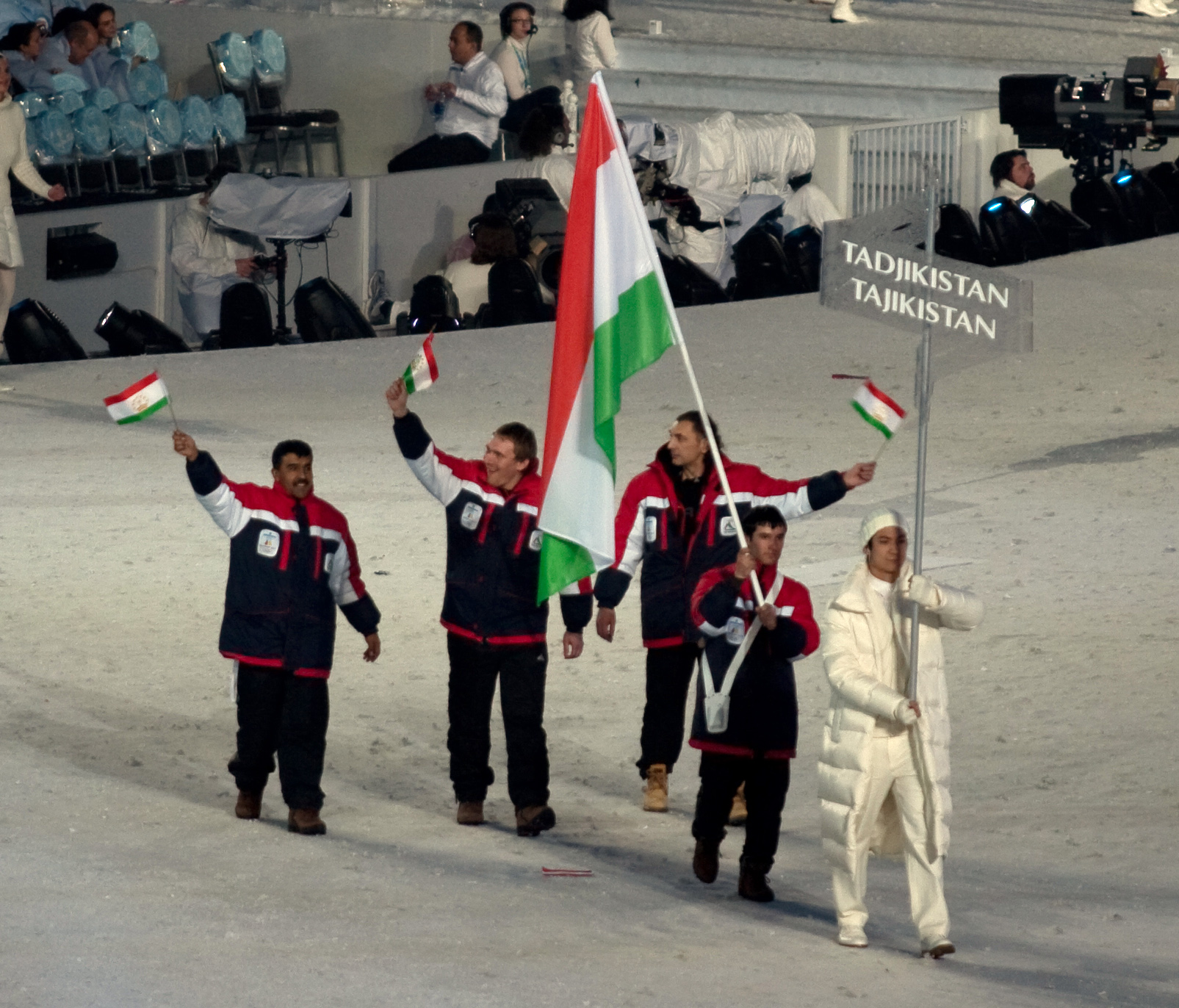
The delegation entering the stadium during the opening ceremony.

== Background ==
The National Olympic Committee of the Republic of Tajikistan was first recognized by the International Olympic Committee in 1993, and Tajikistan made its Olympic debut at the 1996 Atlanta Summer Olympics. The nation made its Winter Olympic Games debut in 2002 in Salt Lake City, and was making its third Winter Olympics appearance in Vancouver. The country has never won a Winter Olympics medal. The Tajikistani delegation in these Olympics consisted of a single alpine skier, Andrei Drygin, who was making his third appearance at the Winter Olympics. Alisher Kudratov, an alpine skier who was not competing in these Olympics, was chosen as the flag bearer for the opening ceremony and official Alisher Quadraton was the flag bearer for the closing ceremony. Kudratov would go on to represent Tajikistan four years later in the Sochi Olympics.

== Alpine skiing ==
Andrei Drygin was 32 years old at the time of the Vancouver Olympics. He took part in four races in these Games, the first, the downhill, took place on 13 February. In the single-run race, he posted a time of 2 minutes and 4 seconds, which placed him 59th and last among the competitors who finished the competition. The super-G was next, on 19 February, and was also a single-run race. Drygin posted a time of 1 minute and 38 seconds, good for 44th place out of 45 competitors to finish the race. Four days later, the giant slalom was a two-run race, and Drygin posted run times of 1 minute and 25 seconds and 1 minute and 29 seconds. His combined time of 3 minutes and 9 seconds was good for 57th place out of 81 competitors who finished both runs. In his final event, the slalom, held on 27 February, he failed to finish the first run in challenging weather conditions.

Men

| Athlete | Event | Run 1 | Run 2 | Total | Rank |
|---|---|---|---|---|---|
| Andrei Drygin | Giant slalom | 1:25.82 | 1:29.47 | 2:55.29 | 57 |
| Andrei Drygin | Slalom | DNF | | | |
| Andrei Drygin | Downhill | — | | 2:04.44 | 59 |
| Andrei Drygin | Super-G | — | | 1:38.03 | 44 |

== See also ==
- Tajikistan at the 2010 Summer Youth Olympics
