= Tajikistan at the 2014 Winter Olympics =

- IOC code: TJK
- NOC: National Olympic Committee of the Republic of Tajikistan
- Website: www.olympic.tj (in Tajik)

in Sochi
- Competitors: 1 in 1 sport
- Flag bearers: Alisher Qudratov (opening and closing)
- Medals: Gold 0 Silver 0 Bronze 0 Total 0

Winter Olympics appearances (overview)
- 2002; 2006; 2010; 2014; 2018–2026

Other related appearances
- Soviet Union (1956–1988)

Tajikistan competed at the 2014 Winter Olympics in Sochi, Russia, from 7 to 23 February 2014. The country's participation in Sochi marked its fourth appearance at the Winter Olympics since its debut in 2002. The team consisted of one alpine skier, Alisher Qudratov. Qudratov served as the flag-bearer during the opening ceremony and closing ceremonies. Tajikistan did not win a medal, and as of these Games, Tajikistan had not earned a Winter Olympic medal.

== Background ==
The National Olympic Committee of the Republic of Tajikistan was first recognized by the International Olympic Committee in 1993. While Tajik athletes competed as a part of Soviet Union since 1952, Tajikistan made its Olympic debut at the 1996 Summer Olympics. The nation made its debut at the Winter Olympics in the 2002 edition held at Salt Lake City.

The 2014 Winter Olympics was held in Sochi, Russia, from 7 to 23 February 2014. This edition of the Games marked Tajikistan's fourth appearance at the Winter Olympics. The Tajikistani delegation consisted of a single alpine skier, Alisher Qudratov. Muhamadsho Abdulloev served as the chef de mission. Tajikistan president Emomali Rahmon attended the opening ceremony. Qudratov served as the nation's flag bearer during the Parade of Nations in the opening ceremony. Previously, he served as the flag bearer for Tajikistan during the opening and the closing ceremonies of the 2010 Winter Olympics, though he did not compete in the Games. He also carried the flag during the closing ceremony. The country did not win a medal at the Games, and has never won a Winter Olympics medal.

== Competitors ==
The Tajik contingent consisted of one athlete competing in a single sport.

Sport	Men	Women	Total
Alpine skiing	1	0	1
Total	1	0	1

== Alpine skiing ==
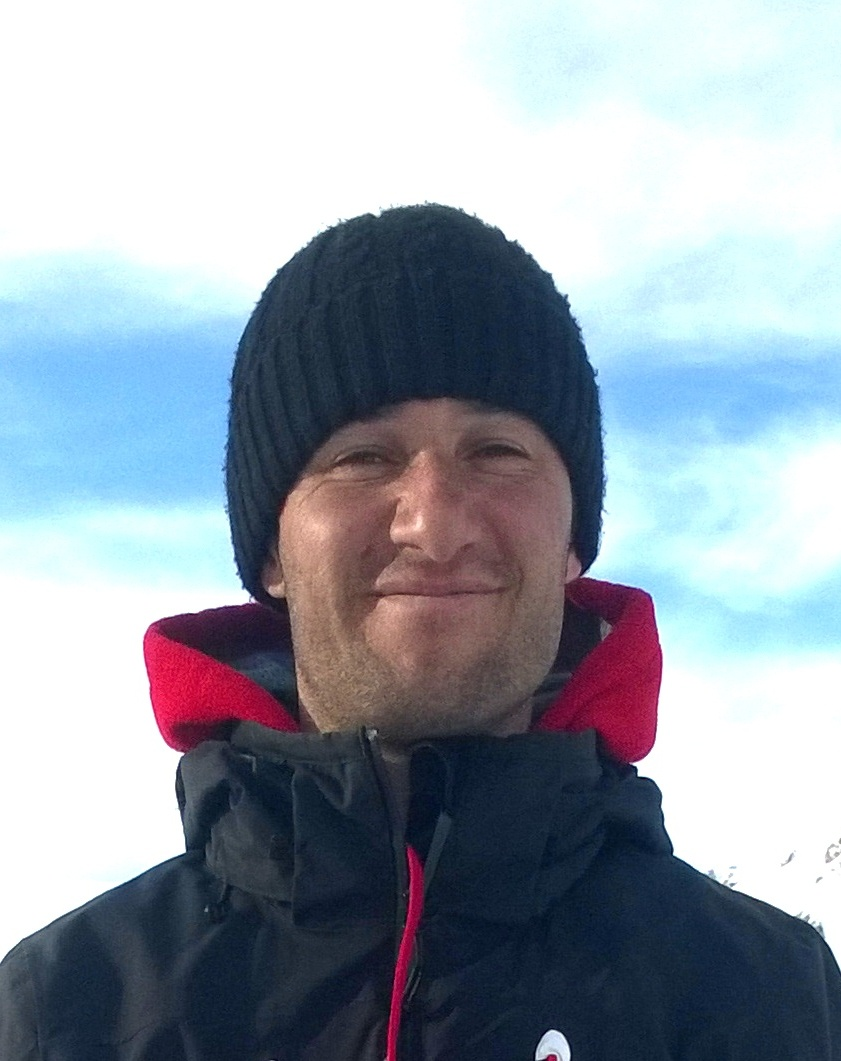
Alisher Qudratov was the lone Tajik participant at the Games

The basic qualification mark for slalom and giant slalom events stipulated an average of less than 140 points in the list published by the International Ski Federation (FIS) as of 19 January 2014 for competitors ranked outside the top 100. The quotas were allocated further based on athletes satisfying other criteria, with a maximum of 22 athletes (maximum of 14 male or 14 female athletes) from a single participating NOC with not more than four participants in a single event. As per the final quota allocation released on 20 January 2014, Tajikistan secured one quota for the slalom event at the Games.

Alisher Qudratov and Andrei Drygin, who was the lone athlete to represent the nation in the previous three editions, initially trained to compete in the Games. The team struggled with lack of funding and resources to train for the Games. Ultimately, as Tajikistan secured only a single quota place, Qudratov represented the nation at the Games. He was only the second athlete from Tajikistan to compete at the Winter Olympics after Drygin. He was born on 11 January 1986 at Saffedara, and competed in international skiing events since 2006. In the 2011 Asian Winter Games in Kazakhstan, he finished in the top ten in the men's Super-G event with a time of 1:15.83. The 2014 edition was Qudratov's only Olympic appearance.

The slalom event was held on 22 February 2014 at the Rosa Khutor Alpine Resort in Krasnodar Krai. Qudratov did not complete his first run and was not classified in the final ranking.

Athlete	Event	Run 1		Run 2		Total	
Athlete	Event	Time	Rank	Time	Rank	Time	Rank
Alisher Qudratov	Men's slalom	DNF					
