= 2001 World Wrestling Championships – Women's freestyle 51 kg =

Women's freestyle 51 kg at the 2001 World Championships
- Venue: Winter Sports Palace
- Dates: 23–25 November 2001
- Competitors: 18 from 18 nations

Medalists
gold medal	Hitomi Sakamoto	Japan
silver medal	Stephanie Murata	United States
bronze medal	Gao Yanzhi	China

The women's freestyle 51 kilograms is a competition featured at the 2001 World Wrestling Championships, and was held at the Winter Sports Palace in Sofia, Bulgaria from 23 to 25 November 2001.

== Results ==
Legend

- F — Won by fall

=== Preliminary round ===
==== Pool 1 ====
Pos	Athlete	Pld	W	L	CP	TP	FRA	BUL	KOR
1	Vanessa Boubryemm (FRA)	2	2	0	7	8	—	4–2	4–1 Fall
2	Julieta Okot (BUL)	2	1	1	5	10	1–3 PP	—	8–5 Fall
3	Park Ji-young (KOR)	2	0	2	0	6	0–4 TO	0–4 TO	—

Source: Official website

==== Pool 2 ====
Pos	Athlete	Pld	W	L	CP	TP	JPN	BLR	SWE
1	Hitomi Sakamoto (JPN)	2	2	0	8	26	—	13–3 Fall	13–2 Fall
2	Alena Kareisha (BLR)	2	1	1	4	3	0–4 TO	—	WO
3	Ida Hellström (SWE)	2	0	2	0	2	0–4 TO	0–4 PA	—

Source: Official website

==== Pool 3 ====
Pos	Athlete	Pld	W	L	CP	TP	RUS	GER	KGZ
1	Natalia Karamchakova (RUS)	2	2	0	8	16	—	5–0 Fall	11–0 Fall
2	Jessica Bechtel (GER)	2	1	1	3	6	0–4 TO	—	6–0
3	Alfia Zaynulina (KGZ)	2	0	2	0	0	0–4 TO	0–3 PO	—

Source: Official website

==== Pool 4 ====
Pos	Athlete	Pld	W	L	CP	TP	SWE	UKR	TUR
1	Gao Yanzhi (CHN)	2	2	0	7	14	—	8–2	6–0 Fall
2	Inessa Rebar (UKR)	2	1	1	4	9	1–3 PP	—	7–1
3	Nadir Uğrun Perçin (TUR)	2	0	2	1	1	0–4 TO	1–3 PP	—

Source: Official website

==== Pool 5 ====
Pos	Athlete	Pld	W	L	CP	TP	CAN	POL	MGL
1	Lyndsay Belisle (CAN)	2	2	0	8	11	—	3–0 Fall	8–0 Fall
2	Marta Wojtanowska (POL)	2	1	1	3	5	0–4 TO	—	5–0
3	Naidangiin Otgonjargal (MGL)	2	0	2	0	0	0–4 TO	0–3 PO	—

Source: Official website

==== Pool 6 ====
Pos	Athlete	Pld	W	L	CP	TP	USA	GRE	AUS
1	Stephanie Murata (USA)	2	2	0	7	18	—	9–3	9–0 Fall
2	Sofia Poumpouridou (GRE)	2	1	1	4	11	1–3 PP	—	8–1
3	Kyla Bremner (AUS)	2	0	2	1	1	0–4 TO	1–3 PP	—

Source: Official website

=== Knockout round ===
Quarterfinals
Vanessa Boubryemm (FRA)	0
Hitomi Sakamoto (JPN)	10^{F}
Natalia Karamchakova (RUS)	1
Gao Yanzhi (CHN)	4

Semifinals
Hitomi Sakamoto (JPN)	6
Gao Yanzhi (CHN)	1
Lyndsay Belisle (CAN)	1
Stephanie Murata (USA)	4

Final
Hitomi Sakamoto (JPN)	12
Stephanie Murata (USA)	1
Bronze medal match
Gao Yanzhi (CHN)	4^{F}
Lyndsay Belisle (CAN)	1
