= 2000 World Wrestling Championships – Women's freestyle 51 kg =

Women's freestyle 51 kg at the 2000 World Championships
- Venue: Universiada Hall
- Dates: 1–3 September 2000
- Competitors: 16 from 16 nations

Medalists
gold medal	Hitomi Sakamoto	Japan
silver medal	Patricia Miranda	United States
bronze medal	Ida Hellström	Sweden

The women's freestyle 51 kilograms is a competition featured at the 2000 World Wrestling Championships, and was held at the Universiada Hall in Sofia, Bulgaria from 1 to 3 September 2000.

== Results ==
=== Preliminary round ===
==== Pool 1 ====
Pos	Athlete	Pld	W	L	CP	TP	JPN	CAN	FRA
1	Hitomi Sakamoto (JPN)	2	2	0	8	20	—	10–0	10–0
2	Lyndsay Belisle (CAN)	2	1	1	4	5	0–4 ST	—	5–1 Fall
3	Anne-Catherine Deluntsch (FRA)	2	0	2	0	1	0–4 ST	0–4 TO	—

Source: Japan Wrestling

==== Pool 2 ====
Pos	Athlete	Pld	W	L	CP	TP	RUS	POL	CZE
1	Elena Egoshina (RUS)	2	2	0	7	9	—	5–0	4–0 Fall
2	Marta Wojtanowska (POL)	2	1	1	4	10	0–3 PO	—	10–0
3	Olina Orlovská (CZE)	2	0	2	0	0	0–4 TO	0–4 ST	—

Source: Japan Wrestling

==== Pool 3 ====
Pos	Athlete	Pld	W	L	CP	TP	UKR	GER	ESP
1	Inessa Rebar (UKR)	2	2	0	7	20	—	9–3	11–0
2	Yvonne Hees (GER)	2	1	1	5	6	1–3 PP	—	3–0 Fall
3	Ana Belén Fernández (ESP)	2	0	2	0	0	0–4 ST	0–4 TO	—

Source: Japan Wrestling

==== Pool 4 ====
Pos	Athlete	Pld	W	L	CP	TP	USA	TPE	TUR
1	Patricia Miranda (USA)	2	2	0	8	23	—	12–1	11–0
2	Wu Li-chuan (TPE)	2	1	1	4	13	1–4 SP	—	12–4
3	Semra Aydın (TUR)	2	0	2	1	4	0–4 ST	1–3 PP	—

Source: Japan Wrestling

==== Pool 5 ====
Pos	Athlete	Pld	W	L	CP	TP	SWE	MEX	TUN	BUL
1	Ida Hellström (SWE)	3	3	0	11	25	—	10–3	5–0 Fall	10–0
2	Magdalena Arellano (MEX)	3	2	1	9	22	1–3 PP	—	13–11 Fall	6–0 Fall
3	Faiza Bejaoui (TUN)	3	1	2	4	15	0–4 TO	0–4 TO	—	4–2 Fall
4	Liliana Shtereva (BUL)	3	0	3	0	2	0–4 ST	0–4 TO	0–4 TO	—

Source: Japan Wrestling

=== Knockout round ===
Quarterfinals
Hitomi Sakamoto (JPN)	10
Elena Egoshina (RUS)	0

Semifinals
Hitomi Sakamoto (JPN)	10
Inessa Rebar (UKR)	0
Patricia Miranda (USA)	4
Ida Hellström (SWE)	2

Final
Hitomi Sakamoto (JPN)	10
Patricia Miranda (USA)	0
Bronze medal match
Inessa Rebar (UKR)	1
Ida Hellström (SWE)	4
