= 2002 World Wrestling Championships – Women's freestyle 51 kg =

Women's freestyle 51 kg at the 2002 World Championships
- Venue: Tasos Kampouris Hall
- Dates: 2–3 November 2002
- Competitors: 18 from 18 nations

Medalists
gold medal	Sofia Poumpouridou	Greece
silver medal	Chiharu Icho	Japan
bronze medal	Natalia Golts	Russia

The women's freestyle 51 kilograms is a competition featured at the 2002 World Wrestling Championships, and was held at the Tasos Kampouris Hall in Chalcis, Greece from 2 to 3 November 2002.

== Results ==
Legend

- F — Won by fall

=== Preliminary round ===
==== Pool 1 ====
Pos	Athlete	Pld	W	L	CP	TP	JPN	USA	POL
1	Chiharu Icho (JPN)	2	2	0	7	10	—	4–1	6–0 Ret
2	Stephanie Murata (USA)	2	1	1	5	1	1–3 PP	—	WO
3	Marta Wojtanowska (POL)	2	0	2	0	0	0–4 PA	0–4 PA	—

Source: Japan Wrestling

==== Pool 2 ====
Pos	Athlete	Pld	W	L	CP	TP	TUR	BUL	FRA
1	Nadir Uğrun Perçin (TUR)	2	2	0	6	11	—	8–5	3–0
2	Julieta Okot (BUL)	2	1	1	4	8	1–3 PP	—	3–0
3	Farah Touchi (FRA)	2	0	2	0	0	0–3 PO	0–3 PO	—

Source: Japan Wrestling

==== Pool 3 ====
Pos	Athlete	Pld	W	L	CP	TP	RUS	CHN	GER
1	Natalia Golts (RUS)	2	2	0	7	14	—	5–3	9–0 Fall
2	Wen Juling (CHN)	2	1	1	5	18	1–3 PP	—	15–4
3	Jessica Bechtel (GER)	2	0	2	1	4	0–4 TO	1–4 SP	—

Source: Japan Wrestling

==== Pool 4 ====
Pos	Athlete	Pld	W	L	CP	TP	UKR	BLR	IND
1	Viktoriya Brandush (UKR)	2	2	0	7	6	—	3–2	3–0 Fall
2	Alena Kareisha (BLR)	2	1	1	5	12	1–3 PP	—	10–0
3	Neha Rathi (IND)	2	0	2	0	0	0–4 TO	0–4 ST	—

Source: Japan Wrestling

==== Pool 5 ====
Pos	Athlete	Pld	W	L	CP	TP	CAN	MGL	AUS
1	Lyndsay Belisle (CAN)	2	2	0	8	14	—	4–0 Fall	10–0
2	Yuragiin Gandolgor (MGL)	2	1	1	4	6	0–4 TO	—	6–2 Fall
3	Kyla Bremner (AUS)	2	0	2	0	2	0–4 ST	0–4 TO	—

Source: Japan Wrestling

==== Pool 6 ====
Pos	Athlete	Pld	W	L	CP	TP	GRE	MEX	PUR
1	Sofia Poumpouridou (GRE)	2	2	0	7	17	—	7–2	10–0
2	Magdalena Arellano (MEX)	2	1	1	5	13	1–3 PP	—	11–0
3	Livanis Rivera (PUR)	2	0	2	0	0	0–4 ST	0–4 ST	—

Source: Japan Wrestling

=== Knockout round ===
Quarterfinals
Chiharu Icho (JPN)	4^{F}
Nadir Uğrun Perçin (TUR)	0
Natalia Golts (RUS)	3^{F}
Viktoriya Brandush (UKR)	0

Semifinals
Chiharu Icho (JPN)	4
Natalia Golts (RUS)	0
Lyndsay Belisle (CAN)	3
Sofia Poumpouridou (GRE)	6

Final
Chiharu Icho (JPN)	0
Sofia Poumpouridou (GRE)	3
Bronze medal match
Natalia Golts (RUS)	3
Lyndsay Belisle (CAN)	0
