= 2005 World Wrestling Championships – Women's freestyle 48 kg =

Women's freestyle 48 kg at the 2005 World Championships
- Venue: László Papp Budapest Sports Arena
- Dates: 28 September 2005
- Competitors: 26 from 26 nations

Medalists
| gold medal | Ren Xuecheng | China |
| silver medal | Iryna Merleni | Ukraine |
| bronze medal | Carol Huynh | Canada |
| bronze medal | Makiko Sakamoto | Japan |

The women's freestyle 48 kilograms is a competition featured at the 2005 World Wrestling Championships, and was held at the László Papp Budapest Sports Arena in Budapest, Hungary on 28 September 2005.

This freestyle wrestling competition consists of a single-elimination tournament, with a repechage used to determine the winner of two bronze medals.

== Results ==
Legend

- F — Won by fall

=== Final ===
| Final |
| Iryna Merleni (UKR) | 2 | 1 |
| Ren Xuecheng (CHN) | 1 | 2^{F} |

=== Top half ===
Round of 32
Mayelis Caripá (VEN) | 3 | 3
Kawtar Othmani (MAR) | 0 | 0
Andrea Vadász-Ember (HUN) | 0 | 0
Zhuldyz Eshimova (KGZ) | 4 | 7

Round of 16
Carol Huynh (CAN) | 2 | 8^{F}
Shumel Khan (IND) | 0 | 0
Iryna Merleni (UKR) | 4^{F}
Sarianne Savola (FIN) | 0
Maryna Markevich (BLR) | 0 | 4 | 5
Olena Bondarenko (NZL) | 1 | 0 | 0
Mayelis Caripá (VEN) | 4 | 3
Zhuldyz Eshimova (KGZ) | 4 | 2

Quarterfinals
Carol Huynh (CAN) | 1 | 1 | 1
Iryna Merleni (UKR) | 1 | 5 | 2
Maryna Markevich (BLR) | 0 | 0
Mayelis Caripá (VEN) | 1 | 4

Semifinals
Iryna Merleni (UKR) | 3^{F}
Mayelis Caripá (VEN) | 0

=== Bottom half ===
Round of 32
Jenny Wong (USA) | 2 | 2 | 3
Dashdavaagiin Baasanjargal (MGL) | 3 | 0 | 0
Sunisa Klahan (THA) | 0
Francine De Paola (ITA) | 6^{F}
Makiko Sakamoto (JPN) | 2 | 1 | 5
Anne-Catherine Deluntsch (FRA) | 1 | 1 | 0
Sigrun Dobner (GER) | 6 | 6
Fernanda Peres (BRA) | 0 | 0
Ren Xuecheng (CHN) | 1 | 6
Fani Psatha (GRE) | 0 | 0
Park Bo-ra (KOR) | 1 | 2
Bekzat Mustafina (KAZ) | 0 | 0
Cristina Croitoru (ROM) | 8 | 0 | 1
Iwona Sadowska (POL) | 2 | 1 | 3
Lilia Kaskarakova (RUS) | 6 | 2
Filiz Çıkrıkçı (TUR) | 0 | 0

Round of 16
Jenny Wong (USA) | 2 | 0 | 6
Francine De Paola (ITA) | 0 | 2 | 1
Makiko Sakamoto (JPN) | 2 | 4^{F}
Sigrun Dobner (GER) | 0 | 0
Ren Xuecheng (CHN) | 7 | 7
Park Bo-ra (KOR) | 0 | 0
Iwona Sadowska (POL) | 0 | 0
Lilia Kaskarakova (RUS) | 3 | 1

Quarterfinals
Jenny Wong (USA) | 0 | 2
Makiko Sakamoto (JPN) | 6 | 6
Ren Xuecheng (CHN) | 2 | 4
Lilia Kaskarakova (RUS) | 0 | 0

Semifinals
Makiko Sakamoto (JPN) | 1 | 1
Ren Xuecheng (CHN) | 1 | 5

=== Repechage ===
Repechage round 1
Fani Psatha (GRE) | 4 | 1
Park Bo-ra (KOR) | 0 | 0

Repechage round 2
Sarianne Savola (FIN) | 0 | 0
Carol Huynh (CAN) | 4 | 1
Fani Psatha (GRE) | 0 | 0
Lilia Kaskarakova (RUS) | 4 | 4

Bronze medals
Carol Huynh (CAN) | 1 | 0 | 1
Mayelis Caripá (VEN) | 0 | 1 | 0
Lilia Kaskarakova (RUS) | 1 | 0 | 0
Makiko Sakamoto (JPN) | 0 | 1 | 7
