= 2008 World Wrestling Championships – Women's freestyle 48 kg =

Women's freestyle 48 kg at the 2008 World Championships
- Venue: Yoyogi National Gymnasium
- Dates: 12 October 2008
- Competitors: 22 from 22 nations

Medalists
gold medal	Clarissa Chun	United States
silver medal	Zhuldyz Eshimova	Kazakhstan
bronze medal	Makiko Sakamoto	Japan
bronze medal	Su Guibei	China

The women's freestyle 48 kilograms is a competition featured at the 2008 World Wrestling Championships, and was held at the Yoyogi National Gymnasium in Tokyo, Japan on 12 October.

This freestyle wrestling competition consists of a single-elimination tournament, with a repechage used to determine the winner of two bronze medals.

== Results ==
Legend

- F — Won by fall

=== Final ===
Final
Clarissa Chun (USA)	1	1
Zhuldyz Eshimova (KAZ)	0	0

=== Top half ===
Round of 32

Round of 16
Makiko Sakamoto (JPN)	3	2
Estera Dobre (ROU)	0	0
Mikhrniso Nurmatova (KGZ)	0	0
Priyanka Singh (IND)	1	1
Dina Tsilavina Mioranirina (MAD)	1	1
Tsai Pei-ching (TPE)	2	4
Clarissa Chun (USA)	5^{F}
Demet Kaya (TUR)	0

Quarterfinals
Makiko Sakamoto (JPN)	4^{F}
Priyanka Singh (IND)	0
Tsai Pei-ching (TPE)	0
Clarissa Chun (USA)	3^{F}

Semifinals
Makiko Sakamoto (JPN)	1	0	1
Clarissa Chun (USA)	0	3	1

=== Bottom half ===
Round of 32
Lindsay Rushton (CAN)	7	1
Silvia Felice (ITA)	1	0
Su Guibei (CHN)	4	3
Elza Tazetdinova (RUS)	0	2
Iwona Sadowska (POL)	1	1
Guadalupe Pérez (MEX)	0	0
Tsogtbazaryn Enkhjargal (MGL)	3	4
Lenka Matejová (SVK)	0	0
Fani Psatha (GRE)	5	1
Nguyễn Thị Lụa (VIE)	0	0
Zhuldyz Eshimova (KAZ)	1	4
Tatsiana Hurnovich (BLR)	0	1

Round of 16
Maribel Jambora (PHI)	0	0
Oleksandra Kohut (UKR)	6	6
Lindsay Rushton (CAN)	0	0
Su Guibei (CHN)	7	1
Iwona Sadowska (POL)	0	0
Tsogtbazaryn Enkhjargal (MGL)	4	7
Fani Psatha (GRE)	4	0	0
Zhuldyz Eshimova (KAZ)	4	1	3

Quarterfinals
Oleksandra Kohut (UKR)	1	1	0
Su Guibei (CHN)	0	4	4
Tsogtbazaryn Enkhjargal (MGL)	0	0
Zhuldyz Eshimova (KAZ)	1	3

Semifinals
Su Guibei (CHN)	0	0
Zhuldyz Eshimova (KAZ)	3	3

=== Repechage ===
Repechage round 1
Tatsiana Hurnovich (BLR)	1	0	0
Fani Psatha (GRE)	0	1	4^{F}

Repechage round 2
Demet Kaya (TUR)	1	2
Tsai Pei-ching (TPE)	0	0
Fani Psatha (GRE)	0	0
Tsogtbazaryn Enkhjargal (MGL)	1	4^{F}

Bronze medals
Demet Kaya (TUR)	0
Makiko Sakamoto (JPN)	2^{F}
Tsogtbazaryn Enkhjargal (MGL)	1	1
Su Guibei (CHN)	1	2
