= Tajikistan at the 2002 Winter Olympics =

- IOC code: TJK
- NOC: National Olympic Committee of the Republic of Tajikistan
- Website: www.olympic.tj (in Tajik)

in Salt Lake City
- Competitors: 1 in 1 sport
- Flag bearer: Gafar Mirzoyev
- Medals: Gold 0 Silver 0 Bronze 0 Total 0

Winter Olympics appearances (overview)
- 2002; 2006; 2010; 2014; 2018–2022; 2026

Other related appearances
- Soviet Union (1956–1988)

Tajikistan sent a delegation to compete in the 2002 Winter Olympics in Salt Lake City, United States, held 8–24 February 2002. This was Tajikistan's first time participating in a Winter Olympic Games. The country sent one representative, alpine skier Andrey Drygin. He failed to finish either of his events.

== Background ==
The National Olympic Committee of the Republic of Tajikistan (NOC) was first recognized by the International Olympic Committee (IOC) in 1993, and Tajikistan made its Olympic debut at the 1996 Atlanta Summer Olympics. The nation was making its Winter Olympic Games debut in these Salt Lake City Games. The country sent one representative, alpine skier Andrey Drygin. Gafar Mirzoyev, the president of the NOC, was selected as the flag bearer for the opening ceremony.

== Alpine skiing ==
Andrey Drygin was 24 years old at the time of the Salt Lake City Olympics. In the super-G held on 16 February, he failed to finish the single run race. On 21 February, in the giant slalom, he finished the first run in a time of 1 minute and 22.01 seconds, which put him in a tie for 68th place. However, he failed to complete the second run, and therefore unclassified for the event. Drygin would later go on to represent Tajikistan twice more, at the 2006 Winter Olympics and the 2010 Winter Olympics.

Athlete	Event	Run 1		Run 2		Final/Total		
Athlete	Event	Time	Rank	Time	Rank	Time	Diff	Rank
Andrey Drygin	Super-G	—N/a				Did not finish		
Andrey Drygin	Giant slalom	1:22.01	68	Did not finish	—N/a	Did not finish		
