= Tajikistan at the Olympics =

- IOC code: TJK
- NOC: National Olympic Committee of the Republic of Tajikistan
- Website: www.olympic.tj (in Tajik)
- Medals Ranked 104th: Gold 1 Silver 1 Bronze 5 Total 7

Summer appearances
- 1996; 2000; 2004; 2008; 2012; 2016; 2020; 2024; 2028

Winter appearances
- 2002; 2006; 2010; 2014; 2018–2026

Other related appearances
- Russian Empire (1900–1912); Soviet Union (1952–1988); Unified Team (1992)

Tajikistan first participated at the Olympic Games as an independent nation in 1996, and has sent athletes to compete in every Summer Olympic Games since then. The nation has also competed at the Winter Olympic Games from 2002 to 2014 as of 2026. To date, Andrei Drygin is one of two people ever to have represented Tajikistan at the Winter Olympic Games, being his country's sole competitor in 2002, 2006, and 2010.

Previously, Tajik athletes competed as part of the Soviet Union until 1988, and after the dissolution of the Soviet Union, Tajikistan was part of the Unified Team in 1992. The following athletes from Tajik SSR were medallists for the Soviet Union: Yuri Lobanov, Zebiniso Rustamova, Nellie Kim and Andrey Abduvaliyev.

Tajikistan won its first Olympic medal at the 2008 Summer Olympics, when Rasul Boqiev took the bronze medal in Men's Judo - 73kg. Dilshod Nazarov won the first gold medal for Tajikistan at the 2016 Summer Olympics in the hammer throw.

The National Olympic Committee for Tajikistan was created in 1992 and recognized by the International Olympic Committee in 1993.

== Medal tables ==
=== Medals by Summer Games ===
Games	Athletes	Gold	Silver	Bronze	Total	Rank
1900–1912	as part of the Russian Empire					
1920–1948	did not participate					
1952–1988	as part of the Soviet Union					
1992 Barcelona	as part of the Unified Team					
1996 Atlanta	8	0	0	0	0	–
2000 Sydney	4	0	0	0	0	–
2004 Athens	9	0	0	0	0	–
2008 Beijing	13	0	1	1	2	64
2012 London	16	0	0	1	1	79
2016 Rio de Janeiro	7	1	0	0	1	54
2020 Tokyo	11	0	0	0	0	–
2024 Paris	15	0	0	3	3	79
2028 Los Angeles	future event					
2032 Brisbane	future event					
Total		1	1	5	7	104

=== Medals by Winter Games ===
Games	Athletes	Gold	Silver	Bronze	Total	Rank
1956–1988	as part of the Soviet Union					
1992 Albertville	as part of the Unified Team					
1994 Lillehammer	did not participate					
1998 Nagano	did not participate					
2002 Salt Lake City	1	0	0	0	0	–
2006 Turin	1	0	0	0	0	–
2010 Vancouver	1	0	0	0	0	–
2014 Sochi	1	0	0	0	0	–
2018 Pyeongchang	did not participate					
2022 Beijing	did not participate					
2026 Milano Cortina	did not participate					
2030 French Alps	future event					
2034 Utah	future event					
Total		0	0	0	0	–

=== Medals by summer sport ===
Sport	Gold	Silver	Bronze	Total
Athletics	1	0	0	1
Wrestling	0	1	0	1
Judo	0	0	3	3
Boxing	0	0	2	2
Totals (4 entries)	1	1	5	7

== List of medalists ==
Medal	Name	Games	Sport	Event
Silver	Yusup Abdusalomov	2008 Beijing	Wrestling	Men's freestyle 84 kg
Bronze	Rasul Boqiev	2008 Beijing	Judo	Men's 73 kg
Bronze	Mavzuna Chorieva	2012 London	Boxing	Women's lightweight
Gold	Dilshod Nazarov	2016 Rio de Janeiro	Athletics	Men's hammer throw
Bronze	Somon Makhmadbekov	2024 Paris	Judo	Men's 81 kg
Bronze	Temur Rakhimov	2024 Paris	Judo	Men's +100 kg
Bronze	Davlat Boltaev	2024 Paris	Boxing	Men's 92 kg

== See also ==
- List of flag bearers for Tajikistan at the Olympics
- Category:Olympic competitors for Tajikistan
- Tajikistan at the Paralympics
