= 2003 World Wrestling Championships – Women's freestyle 51 kg =

Women's freestyle 51 kg at the 2003 World Championships
- Venue: Madison Square Garden
- Dates: 12–14 September 2003
- Competitors: 18 from 18 nations

Medalists
gold medal	Chiharu Icho	Japan
silver medal	Natalia Karamchakova	Russia
bronze medal	Jenny Wong	United States

The women's freestyle 51 kilograms is a competition featured at the 2003 World Wrestling Championships, and was held at the Madison Square Garden in New York, United States from 12 to 14 September 2003.

== Results ==
=== Preliminary round ===
==== Pool 1 ====
Pos	Athlete	Pld	W	L	CP	TP	FRA	POL	TPE
1	Anne-Catherine Deluntsch (FRA)	2	2	0	6	12	—	6–1	6–0
2	Elżbieta Stryczek (POL)	2	1	1	5	5	1–3 PP	—	4–0 Fall
3	Wu Li-chuan (TPE)	2	0	2	0	0	0–3 PO	0–4 TO	—

Source: Official website

==== Pool 2 ====
Pos	Athlete	Pld	W	L	CP	TP	USA	CAN	MGL
1	Jenny Wong (USA)	2	2	0	6	11	—	6–1	5–0
2	Teresa Piotrowski (CAN)	2	1	1	4	6	1–3 PP	—	5–0
3	Yuragiin Gandolgor (MGL)	2	0	2	0	0	0–3 PO	0–3 PO	—

Source: Official website

==== Pool 3 ====
Pos	Athlete	Pld	W	L	CP	TP	CHN	GRE	GBR
1	Wen Juling (CHN)	2	2	0	8	21	—	10–0	11–0
2	Myrsini Koloni (GRE)	2	1	1	4	4	0–4 ST	—	4–0 Fall
3	Joanna Mills (GBR)	2	0	2	0	0	0–4 ST	0–4 TO	—

Source: Official website

==== Pool 4 ====
Pos	Athlete	Pld	W	L	CP	TP	RUS	SUI	SEN
1	Natalia Karamchakova (RUS)	2	2	0	8	21	—	10–0	11–0
2	Nadine Tokar (SUI)	2	1	1	4	3	0–4 ST	—	3–4 Fall
3	Évelyne Diatta (SEN)	2	0	2	0	4	0–4 ST	0–4 TO	—

Source: Official website

==== Pool 5 ====
Pos	Athlete	Pld	W	L	CP	TP	JPN	GER	HUN
1	Chiharu Icho (JPN)	2	2	0	8	15	—	11–0	4–0 Fall
2	Alexandra Demmel (GER)	2	1	1	4	6	0–4 ST	—	6–1 Fall
3	Emese Szabó (HUN)	2	0	2	0	1	0–4 TO	0–4 TO	—

Source: Official website

==== Pool 6 ====
Pos	Athlete	Pld	W	L	CP	TP	BLR	UKR	AUT
1	Alena Kareisha (BLR)	2	2	0	6	6	—	3–1	3–0
2	Inessa Rebar (UKR)	2	1	1	4	11	1–3 PP	—	10–2
3	Alexandra Hinterbauer (AUT)	2	0	2	1	2	0–3 PO	1–3 PP	—

Source: Official website

=== Knockout round ===
Quarterfinals
Anne-Catherine Deluntsch (FRA)	2
Jenny Wong (USA)	6
Wen Juling (CHN)	3
Natalia Karamchakova (RUS)	4

Semifinals
Jenny Wong (USA)	0
Natalia Karamchakova (RUS)	3
Chiharu Icho (JPN)	10
Alena Kareisha (BLR)	0

Final
Natalia Karamchakova (RUS)	0
Chiharu Icho (JPN)	3
Bronze medal match
Jenny Wong (USA)	3
Alena Kareisha (BLR)	2
