= Tajikistan at the 2012 Summer Olympics =

- IOC code: TJK
- NOC: National Olympic Committee of the Republic of Tajikistan
- Website: www.olympic.tj (in Tajik)

in London
- Competitors: 16 in 7 sports
- Flag bearer: Mavzuna Chorieva
- Medals Ranked 79th: Gold 0 Silver 0 Bronze 1 Total 1

Summer Olympics appearances (overview)
- 1996; 2000; 2004; 2008; 2012; 2016; 2020; 2024

Other related appearances
- Russian Empire (1900–1912); Soviet Union (1952–1988); Unified Team (1992)

Tajikistan competed at the 2012 Summer Olympics in London, from 27 July to 12 August 2012. This was the nation's fifth consecutive appearance at the Olympics. The National Olympic Committee of the Republic of Tajikistan sent the nation's largest delegation to the Games. A total of 16 athletes, 13 men and 3 women, competed in 7 sports. Six of these athletes had competed in Beijing, including judoka Rasul Boqiev and freestyle wrestler Yusup Abdusalomov, who both won Tajikistan's first ever Olympic medals.

Tajikistan left London with only a single medal, following its successful Olympics in Beijing. Boxer Mavzuna Chorieva, who won the bronze in women's lightweight division, set a historic Olympic record, as the nation's first female medalist in history, and first female flag bearer at the opening ceremony.

== Medalists ==
Medal	Name	Sport	Event	Date
Bronze	Mavzuna Chorieva	Boxing	Women's lightweight	8 August

== Athletics ==
Tajikistani athletes have so far achieved qualifying standards in the following athletics events (up to a maximum of 3 athletes in each event at the 'A' Standard, and 1 at the 'B' Standard):

Key

- Note – Ranks given for track events are within the athlete's heat only
- Q = Qualified for the next round
- q = Qualified for the next round as a fastest loser or, in field events, by position without achieving the qualifying target
- NR = National record
- N/A = Round not applicable for the event
- Bye = Athlete not required to compete in round

Men

Athlete	Event	Qualification		Final	
Athlete	Event	Distance	Position	Distance	Position
Dilshod Nazarov	Hammer throw	75.91	8 q	73.80	10

Women

Athlete	Event	Heat		Semifinal		Final	
Athlete	Event	Result	Rank	Result	Rank	Result	Rank
Vladislava Ovcharenko	200 m	24.39	9	Did not advance			

== Boxing ==
Tajikistan has so far qualified boxers for the following events

Men

Athlete	Event	Round of 32	Round of 16	Quarterfinals	Semifinals	Final	
Athlete	Event	Opposition Result	Opposition Result	Opposition Result	Opposition Result	Opposition Result	Rank
Anvar Yunusov	Bantamweight	Bye	Valdez (MEX); L 7–13	did not advance			
Sobirdzhon Nazarov	Middleweight	Kasuto (NAM); L 8–11	Did not advance				
Jahon Qurbonov	Light heavyweight	El-Mekachari (TUN); L 6–8	did not advance				

Women

Athlete	Event	Round of 16	Quarterfinals	Semifinals	Final	
Athlete	Event	Opposition Result	Opposition Result	Opposition Result	Opposition Result	Rank
Mavzuna Chorieva	Lightweight	Bye	Dong C (CHN); W 13–8	Taylor (IRL); L 9–17	Did not advance	3rd place, bronze medalist(s)

== Judo ==
Tajikistan has qualified 2 judokas

Athlete	Event	Round of 64	Round of 32	Round of 16	Quarterfinals	Semifinals	Repechage	Final / BM	
Athlete	Event	Opposition Result	Opposition Result	Opposition Result	Opposition Result	Opposition Result	Opposition Result	Opposition Result	Rank
Rasul Boqiev	Men's −73 kg	Bye	Williams (GBR); W 1001–0000	Jurakobilov (UZB); W 1001–0001	Nakaya (JPN); L 0002–0011	Did not advance	Legrand (FRA); L 0002–0010	Did not advance	7
Parviz Sobirov	Men's −90 kg	—N/a	Meloni (ITA); L 0013–0101	Did not advance					

== Shooting ==
Men

Athlete	Event	Qualification		Final	
Athlete	Event	Points	Rank	Points	Rank
Sergey Babikov	10 m air pistol	562	44	Did not advance	

== Swimming ==
Women

Athlete	Event	Heat		Semifinal		Final	
Athlete	Event	Time	Rank	Time	Rank	Time	Rank
Katerina Izmaylova	50 m freestyle	31.27	60	Did not advance			

== Taekwondo ==
Tajikistan has qualified the following quota places.

Athlete	Event	Round of 16	Quarterfinals	Semifinals	Repechage	Bronze medal	Final	
Athlete	Event	Opposition Result	Opposition Result	Opposition Result	Opposition Result	Opposition Result	Opposition Result	Rank
Farkhod Negmatov	Men's −80 kg	Muhammad (GBR); L 1–7	Did not advance					
Alisher Gulov	Men's +80 kg	Molfetta (ITA); L 3–7	Did not advance		Liu Xb (CHN); L 1–6	Did not advance		

== Wrestling ==
Tajikistan has qualified the following athletes at the wrestling competition.

Key

- VT - Victory by Fall.
- PP - Decision by Points - the loser with technical points.
- PO - Decision by Points - the loser without technical points.

Men's freestyle

Athlete	Event	Qualification	Round of 16	Quarterfinal	Semifinal	Repechage 1	Repechage 2	Final / BM	
Athlete	Event	Opposition Result	Opposition Result	Opposition Result	Opposition Result	Opposition Result	Opposition Result	Opposition Result	Rank
Nikolay Noev	−55 kg	Velikov (BUL); L 0–3 ^{PO}	Did not advance						18
Zalimkhan Yusupov	−66 kg	Gogaev (RUS); W 3–0 ^{PO}	Garcia (CAN); L 1–3 ^{PP}	Did not advance					11
Yusup Abdusalomov	−84 kg	Nurmagomedov (ARM); L 1–3 ^{PP}	Did not advance						15
Rustam Iskandari	−96 kg	Bye	Andriitsev (UKR); L 1–3 ^{PP}	Did not advance		Bye	Gazyumov (AZE); L 1–3 ^{PP}	Did not advance	12
