= Tajikistan at the 2006 Winter Olympics =

- IOC code: TJK
- NOC: National Olympic Committee of the Republic of Tajikistan
- Website: www.olympic.tj (in Tajik)

in Turin
- Competitors: 1 (1 man) in 1 sport
- Flag bearers: Andrei Drygin (opening); Abdugafar Sharipov (closing)
- Medals: Gold 0 Silver 0 Bronze 0 Total 0

Winter Olympics appearances (overview)
- 2002; 2006; 2010; 2014; 2018–2026

Other related appearances
- Soviet Union (1956–1988)

Tajikistan sent a delegation to compete at the 2006 Winter Olympics in Turin, Italy from 10–26 February 2010. This was the second time Tajikistan had participated in a Winter Olympic Games. The Tajikistani delegation consisted of one alpine skier, Andrei Drygin. He finished 51st in both the super-G and the downhill.

== Background ==
The National Olympic Committee of the Republic of Tajikistan was first recognized by the International Olympic Committee (IOC) in 1993, and Tajikistan made its Olympic debut at the 1996 Atlanta Summer Olympics. The nation debuted at the Winter Olympic Games in 2002 in Salt Lake City, and was making its second Winter Olympics appearance in Turin. The Tajikistani delegation to Turin consisted of one alpine skier, Andrei Drygin. He was the flag bearer for the opening ceremony while Abdugafar Sharipov performed the duties for the closing ceremony. Sharipov was a non-competitor at these Olympics however, he was listed by the IOC as an alpine skier.

== Alpine skiing ==
Andrei Drygin was 28 years old at the time of the Turin Olympics. He had previously represented Tajikistan at the 2002 Winter Olympics. According to the official report of these Olympics, he finished last in each of the first two downhill training runs. His performance in the actual race of the downhill, held on 12 February, was better. He finished the race in a time of 1 minute and 59.41 seconds, good for 51st place out of 53 competitors who completed the competition. On 18 February he took part in the super-G, finishing in a time of 1 minute and 37.85 seconds, again finishing 51st, this time out of 56 classified finishers. On 20 February, in the giant slalom, he failed to finish the first run. Drygin would go on to represent Tajikistan again four years later at the Vancouver Olympics.

| Athlete | Event | Final | | | |
| Athlete | Event | Run 1 | Run 2 | Total | Rank |
|---|---|---|---|---|---|
| Andrei Drygin | Men's downhill | n/a | | 1:59.41 | 51 |
| Andrei Drygin | Men's super-G | n/a | | 1:37.85 | 51 |
| Andrei Drygin | Men's giant slalom | did not finish | | | |
