= Lee Jong-hwa =

Lee Jong-hwa may refer to:

- Lee Jong-hwa (footballer)
- Lee Jong-hwa (actor)
- Lee Jong-hwa (diver)
