= Lidiya Karamchakova =

Russian-Tajikistani freestyle wrestler

Personal information
- Full name: Lidiya Karamchakova
- Nationality: Russia; Tajikistan
- Born: 17 February 1968 (age 58) Abakan, Russian SFSR, Soviet Union
- Height: 1.62 m (5 ft 4 in)
- Weight: 48 kg (106 lb)

Sport
- Style: Freestyle
- Club: Viktor Wrestling (RUS)
- Coach: Viktor Raiko (RUS)
Medal record
Women's freestyle wrestling
Representing Russia
European Championships
Gold medal – first place	2000 Budapest	46 kg
Bronze medal – third place	1997 Warsaw	46 kg
Representing Tajikistan
Asian Games
Silver medal – second place	2002 Busan	48 kg

Lidiya Karamchakova (Russian: Лидия Карамчакова; born February 17, 1968, in Abakan, Russian SFSR) is a retired amateur Russian-Tajikistani freestyle wrestler, who competed in the women's flyweight category. Karamchakova's wrestling career emerged with two career medals at the European Championships (1997 and 2000), before acquiring a dual citizenship to compete for Tajikistan in 2002. Since then, she scored a silver in the 48-kg division at the 2002 Asian Games in Busan, South Korea, and also finished seventh at the 2004 Summer Olympics. Karamchakova is also a member of the Viktor Wrestling Club in Krasnoyarsk, under her personal coach Viktor Raiko.

Karamchakova reached sporting headlines at the 2002 Asian Games in Busan, South Korea, where she picked up a silver medal in the women's flyweight category (48 kg), being pinned by China's Zhong Xiue.

When women's wrestling made its debut at the 2004 Summer Olympics in Athens, Karamchakova qualified for her naturalized Tajik squad in the inaugural 48 kg class. Earlier in the process, she placed third and guaranteed a spot on the Tajik wrestling team from the Olympic Qualification Tournament in Madrid, Spain. Karamchakova lost her opening match to eventual Olympic champion Irini Merleni of Ukraine on technical superiority, but bounced back to upset Greece's Fani Psatha in front of the home audience with a 5–3 verdict, and then pinned Tunisia's Fadhila Louati before reaching the two-minute mark. Despite missing a spot for the semifinals, Karamchakova had a chance to compete against Russia's Lorisa Oorzhak, but she fell behind her fellow Russian rival by a rare 11–0 defeat, placing seventh in the final standings.
