= Nabiyev =

Nabiyev or Nabiev (Azerbaijani: Nəbiyev, Russian: Набиев) is a Russianized Turkic (Tatar, Kazakh, Uzbek, Azerbaijani), Iranian (Tajik), and Caucasian (Dagestan) family name. Notable people with the surname include:

- Agil Nabiyev (born 1982), Azerbaijani football player
- Khurshid Nabiev (born 1985), Uzbek judoka
- Nadir Nabiyev (born 1980), Azerbaijani football player
- Narguis Nabieva (born 1985), Tajik athlete
- Rahmon Nabiyev (1930–1993), Tajik politician and President
- Tatiana Nabieva (born 1994), Russian gymnast
