= Wrestling at the 2004 Summer Olympics – Women's freestyle 48 kg =

2004 Summer Olympics event

Women's freestyle 48 kg at the Games of the XXVIII Olympiad
- Venue: Ano Liosia Olympic Hall
- Date: 22–23 August 2004
- Competitors: 14 from 14 nations

Medalists
1st place, gold medalist(s)		Iryna Merleni	Ukraine
2nd place, silver medalist(s)		Chiharu Icho	Japan
3rd place, bronze medalist(s)		Patricia Miranda	United States

The women's freestyle 48 kilograms at the 2004 Summer Olympics as part of the wrestling program were held at the Ano Liosia Olympic Hall, in Athens, Greece from August 22 to August 23.

The competition is held with an elimination system of three or four wrestlers in each pool, with the winners qualify for the semifinals and final by way of direct elimination.

== Schedule ==
All times are Eastern European Summer Time (UTC+03:00)

Date	Time	Event
22 August 2004	09:30	Round 1
22 August 2004	09:30	Round 2
22 August 2004	17:30	Round 3
23 August 2004	09:30	Semifinals
23 August 2004	17:30	Finals

== Results ==
Legend

- F — Won by fall

=== Elimination pools ===
==== Pool 1 ====
Pos	Athlete	Pld	W	L	CP	TP	Qualification
1	Chiharu Icho (JPN)	2	2	0	8	19	Semifinals
2	Brigitte Wagner (GER)	2	1	1	3	4	Classification 5–8
3	Lyndsay Belisle (CAN)	2	0	2	1	3	

Source: Official website

	Score		CP
Chiharu Icho (JPN)	12–0	Lyndsay Belisle (CAN)	4–0 ST
Brigitte Wagner (GER)	0–7 Fall	Chiharu Icho (JPN)	0–4 TO
Lyndsay Belisle (CAN)	3–4	Brigitte Wagner (GER)	1–3 PP

==== Pool 2 ====
Pos	Athlete	Pld	W	L	CP	TP	Qualification
1	Angélique Berthenet (FRA)	2	2	0	7	10	Semifinals
2	Tsogtbazaryn Enkhjargal (MGL)	2	1	1	5	16	Classification 5–8
3	Leopoldina Ross (GBS)	2	0	2	0	0	

Source: Official website

	Score		CP
Angélique Berthenet (FRA)	7–4	Tsogtbazaryn Enkhjargal (MGL)	3–1 PP
Leopoldina Ross (GBS)	0–3 Fall	Angélique Berthenet (FRA)	0–4 TO
Tsogtbazaryn Enkhjargal (MGL)	12–0	Leopoldina Ross (GBS)	4–0 ST

==== Pool 3 ====
Pos	Athlete	Pld	W	L	CP	TP	Qualification
1	Iryna Merleni (UKR)	3	3	0	12	31	Semifinals
2	Lidiya Karamchakova (TJK)	3	2	1	7	8	Classification 5–8
3	Fani Psatha (GRE)	3	1	2	5	8	
4	Fadhila Louati (TUN)	3	0	3	0	0	

Source: Official website

	Score		CP
Fani Psatha (GRE)	5–0 Fall	Fadhila Louati (TUN)	4–0 TO
Lidiya Karamchakova (TJK)	0–11	Iryna Merleni (UKR)	0–4 ST
Fani Psatha (GRE)	3–5	Lidiya Karamchakova (TJK)	1–3 PP
Fadhila Louati (TUN)	0–10	Iryna Merleni (UKR)	0–4 ST
Fani Psatha (GRE)	0–10	Iryna Merleni (UKR)	0–4 ST
Fadhila Louati (TUN)	0–3 Fall	Lidiya Karamchakova (TJK)	0–4 TO

==== Pool 4 ====
Pos	Athlete	Pld	W	L	CP	TP	Qualification
1	Patricia Miranda (USA)	3	3	0	10	26	Semifinals
2	Lorisa Oorzhak (RUS)	3	2	1	7	22	Classification 5–8
3	Li Hui (CHN)	3	1	2	6	24	
4	Mayelis Caripá (VEN)	3	0	3	1	1	

Source: Official website

	Score		CP
Patricia Miranda (USA)	8–5	Li Hui (CHN)	3–1 PP
Lorisa Oorzhak (RUS)	7–0	Mayelis Caripá (VEN)	3–0 PO
Patricia Miranda (USA)	7–3	Lorisa Oorzhak (RUS)	3–1 PP
Li Hui (CHN)	10–0	Mayelis Caripá (VEN)	4–0 ST
Patricia Miranda (USA)	11–1	Mayelis Caripá (VEN)	4–1 SP
Li Hui (CHN)	9–12	Lorisa Oorzhak (RUS)	1–3 PP

=== Classification 5–8 ===
Qualification 5–6		Classification 5–6
Brigitte Wagner (GER)	3^{F}
Tsogtbazaryn Enkhjargal (MGL)	0	Brigitte Wagner (GER)	1
Lidiya Karamchakova (TJK)	0	Lorisa Oorzhak (RUS)	3
Lorisa Oorzhak (RUS)	11

=== Final round ===
Semifinals
Chiharu Icho (JPN)	12
Angélique Berthenet (FRA)	1
Iryna Merleni (UKR)	9
Patricia Miranda (USA)	0

Gold medal match
Chiharu Icho (JPN)	2
Iryna Merleni (UKR)	2
Bronze medal match
Angélique Berthenet (FRA)	4
Patricia Miranda (USA)	12

== Final standing ==
Rank	Athlete
1st place, gold medalist(s)	Iryna Merleni (UKR)
2nd place, silver medalist(s)	Chiharu Icho (JPN)
3rd place, bronze medalist(s)	Patricia Miranda (USA)
4	Angélique Berthenet (FRA)
5	Lorisa Oorzhak (RUS)
6	Brigitte Wagner (GER)
7	Lidiya Karamchakova (TJK)
8	Tsogtbazaryn Enkhjargal (MGL)
9	Li Hui (CHN)
10	Fani Psatha (GRE)
11	Lyndsay Belisle (CAN)
12	Mayelis Caripá (VEN)
13	Leopoldina Ross (GBS)
14	Fadhila Louati (TUN)
