= Tajikistan at the 2000 Summer Olympics =

- IOC code: TJK
- NOC: National Olympic Committee of the Republic of Tajikistan
- Website: www.olympic.tj (in Tajik)

in Sydney
- Competitors: 4 in 2 sports
- Flag bearer: Khurshed Hasanov
- Medals: Gold 0 Silver 0 Bronze 0 Total 0

Summer Olympics appearances (overview)
- 1996; 2000; 2004; 2008; 2012; 2016; 2020; 2024

Other related appearances
- Russian Empire (1900–1912); Soviet Union (1952–1988); Unified Team (1992)

Tajikistan competed at the 2000 Summer Olympics in Sydney, Australia.

== Athletics ==
Men

Athlete	Event	Final	
Athlete	Event	Result	Rank
Sergey Zabavsky	Marathon	2:30:29	68

Women

Athlete	Event	Final	
Athlete	Event	Result	Rank
Gulsara Dadabayeva	Marathon	2:51:03	41

== Swimming ==
Men

Athlete	Event	Heat		Semifinal		Final	
Athlete	Event	Time	Rank	Time	Rank	Time	Rank
Farkhod Oripov	100 m freestyle	DSQ		did not advance			

Women

Athlete	Event	Heat		Semifinal		Final	
Athlete	Event	Time	Rank	Time	Rank	Time	Rank
Katerina Izmaylova	100 m freestyle	1:19.12	54	did not advance			

== Sources ==
- Official Olympic Reports
- https://www.topendsports.com/events/summer/countries/tajikistan.htm
