= Mavzuna Chorieva =

Tajikistani boxer (born 1992)

Personal information
- Nationality: Tajikistani
- Born: 1 October 1992 (age 33) Kulob, Tajikistan
- Height: 1.6 m (5 ft 3 in)
Medal record
Women's amateur boxing
Representing Tajikistan
Olympic Games
Bronze medal – third place	2012 London	Lightweight
World Amateur Championships
Bronze medal – third place	2012 Qinhuangdao	Lightweight

Mavzuna Chorieva (born 1 October 1992 in Kulob, Tajikistan) is a Tajikistani boxer. She won bronze at the 2012 Summer Olympics in the lightweight event. Mavzuna Chorieva became the first woman to win an Olympic medal for Tajikistan.

Olympic Games
Preceded by Alisher Kudratov	Flagbearer for Tajikistan; 2012 London	Succeeded by Dilshod Nazarov
