= Tajikistan at the 2024 Summer Olympics =

- IOC code: TJK
- NOC: National Olympic Committee of the Republic of Tajikistan
- Website: www.olympic.tj (in Tajik)

in Paris, France 26 July 2024 – 11 August 2024
- Competitors: 14 (11 men and 3 women) in 6 sports
- Flag bearers: Temur Rakhimov & Mijgona Samadova
- Medals Ranked 79th: Gold 0 Silver 0 Bronze 3 Total 3

Summer Olympics appearances (overview)
- 1996; 2000; 2004; 2008; 2012; 2016; 2020; 2024

Other related appearances
- Russian Empire (1900–1912); Soviet Union (1952–1988); Unified Team (1992)

Tajikistan competed at the 2024 Summer Olympics in Paris from 26 July to 11 August 2024. It was the nation's eighth consecutive appearance at the Summer Olympics in the post-Soviet era.

== Medalists ==
Medal	Name	Sport	Event	Date
Bronze	Somon Makhmadbekov	Judo	Men's 81 kg	30 July
Bronze	Temur Rakhimov	Judo	Men's +100 kg	2 August
Bronze	Davlat Boltaev	Boxing	Men's 92 kg	4 August

Medals by sport
Sport	1st place, gold medalist(s)	2nd place, silver medalist(s)	3rd place, bronze medalist(s)	Total
Judo	0	0	2	2
Boxing	0	0	1	1
Total	0	0	3	3

Medals by gender
Gender	1st place, gold medalist(s)	2nd place, silver medalist(s)	3rd place, bronze medalist(s)	Total
Male	0	0	3	3
Female	0	0	0	0
Mixed	0	0	0	0
Total	0	0	3	3

Medals by date
Date	1st place, gold medalist(s)	2nd place, silver medalist(s)	3rd place, bronze medalist(s)	Total
30 July	0	0	1	1
02 August	0	0	1	1
04 August	0	0	1	1
Total	0	0	3	3

== Competitors ==
The following is the list of number of competitors in the Games.

Sport	Men	Women	Total
Athletics	1	0	1
Boxing	2	1	3
Judo	6	0	6
Swimming	1	1	2
Taekwondo	0	1	1
Wrestling	1	0	1
Total	11	3	14

== Athletics ==
Tajikistan sent one sprinter to compete at the 2024 Summer Olympics.

Key

- Note–Ranks given for track events are within the athlete's heat only
- Q = Qualified for the next round
- q = Qualified for the next round as a fastest loser or, in field events, by position without achieving the qualifying target
- NR = National record
- N/A = Round not applicable for the event
- Bye = Athlete not required to compete in round

Track events

Athlete	Event	Preliminaries		Heat		Semifinal		Final	
Athlete	Event	Result	Rank	Result	Rank	Result	Rank	Result	Rank
Favoriz Muzrapov	Men's 100 m	10.60	3	Did not advance					

== Boxing ==
Tajikistan entered three boxers into the Olympic tournament. Davlat Boltaev (men's heavyweight) and Mijgona Samadova (women's featherweight) secured their spots in their respective division, by advancing to the final and semifinal round at the 2022 Asian Games in Hangzhou, China. Later on, Bakhodur Usmonov (men's lightweight) qualified for Paris 2024, by winning the quota bouts round, at the 2024 World Olympic Qualification Tournament 1 in Busto Arsizio, Italy.

Athlete	Event	Round of 32	Round of 16	Quarterfinals	Semifinals	Final	
Athlete	Event	Opposition Result	Opposition Result	Opposition Result	Opposition Result	Opposition Result	Rank
Bakhodur Usmonov	Men's 63.5 kg	Rosenov (HUN); L 0–5	Did not advance				
Davlat Boltaev	Men's 92 kg	—N/a	Kushitashvili (GEO); W 3–2	Marley (IRL); W 4–1	Mullojonov (UZB); L 1–4	Did not advance	3rd place, bronze medalist(s)
Mijgona Samadova	Women's 57 kg	Mendoza (USA); L 2–3	Did not advance				

== Judo ==
Tajikistan qualified five judokas for the following weight classes at the Games. Nurali Emomali (men's half-lightweight, 66 kg), Behruzi Khojazoda (men's lightweight, 73 kg), Somon Makhmadbekov (men's half-middleweight, 81 kg), Komronshokh Ustopiriyon (men's middleweight, 90 kg), and Temur Rakhimov (men's heavyweight, +100 kg) got qualified via quota based on IJF World Ranking List and continental quota based on Olympic point rankings.

Athlete	Event	Round of 64	Round of 32	Round of 16	Quarterfinals	Semifinals	Repechage	Final / BM	
Athlete	Event	Opposition Result	Opposition Result	Opposition Result	Opposition Result	Opposition Result	Opposition Result	Opposition Result	Rank
Nurali Emomali	Men's −66 kg	—N/a	Bye	Shmailov (ISR); W 01–00	Abe (JPN); L 00–10	—N/a	Bunčić (SRB) withdrew	Did not advance	
Behruzi Khojazoda	Men's −73 kg	—N/a	Margelidon (CAN); L 01–00	Did not advance					
Somon Makhmadbekov	Men's −81 kg	Bye	Badawi (PLE); W 10–00	de Wit (NED); W 01–00	Grigalashvili (GEO); L 00–01	—N/a	Boltaboev (UZB); W 10–00	Esposito (ITA); W 10–00	3rd place, bronze medalist(s)
Komronshokh Ustopiriyon	Men's −90 kg	—N/a	Mosakhlishvili (ESP); L 10–00	Did not advance					
Dzhakhongir Madzhidov	Men's −100 kg	—N/a	Diesse (FRA); L 00–10	Did not advance					
Temur Rakhimov	Men's +100 kg	—N/a	Bye	Erik Abramov (GER); W 10–01	Alisher Yusupov (UZB); W 11–01	Teddy Riner (FRA); L 00–10	Bye	Andy Granda (CUB); W 01–00	3rd place, bronze medalist(s)

== Swimming ==
Tajikistan sent two swimmers to compete at the 2024 Paris Olympics.

Athlete	Event	Heat		Semifinal		Final	
Athlete	Event	Time	Rank	Time	Rank	Time	Rank
Fakhriddin Madkamov	Men's 50 m freestyle	26.23	56	Did not advance			
Ekaterina Bordachyova	Women's 50 m freestyle	28.85	53	Did not advance			

== Taekwondo ==
Tajikistan qualified one athlete to compete at the games. Munira Abdusalomova qualified for the games, after winning the semifinal rounds in her class, at the 2024 Asian Qualification Tournament in Tai'an, China; marking the nations returning to these sport since the last participation at 2012.

Athlete	Event	Qualification	Round of 16	Quarterfinals	Semifinals	Repechage	Final / BM	
Athlete	Event	Opposition Result	Opposition Result	Opposition Result	Opposition Result	Opposition Result	Opposition Result	Rank
Munira Abdusalomova	Women's +67 kg	Bye	Laurin (FRA); L 0–2	—N/a		Brandl (GER); L 0–2	Did not advance	

== Wrestling ==
For the first time since 2012, Tajikistan qualified one wrestler for the following class in the Olympic competition. Viktor Rassadin qualified for the games through the 2024 World Qualification Tournament in Istanbul, Turkey.

Key:

- VT (ranking points: 5–0 or 0–5) – Victory by fall.
- VB (ranking points: 5–0 or 0–5) – Victory by injury (VF for forfeit, VA for withdrawal or disqualification)
- PP (ranking points: 3–1 or 1–3) – Decision by points – the loser with technical points.
- PO (ranking points: 3–0 or 0–3) – Decision by points – the loser without technical points.
- ST (ranking points: 4–0 or 0–4) – Great superiority – the loser without technical points and a margin of victory of at least 8 (Greco-Roman) or 10 (freestyle) points.
- SP (ranking points: 4–1 or 1–4) – Technical superiority – the loser with technical points and a margin of victory of at least 8 (Greco-Roman) or 10 (freestyle) points.

Freestyle

Athlete	Event	Round of 16	Quarterfinal	Semifinal	Repechage	Final / BM	
Athlete	Event	Opposition Result	Opposition Result	Opposition Result	Opposition Result	Opposition Result	Rank
Viktor Rassadin	Men's −74 kg	Kougioumtsidis (GRE); W 8–2	Lu (CHN); W 7–4	Jamalov (UZB); L 2–8	—N/a	Valiev (ALB); L 2–6	=5
