= Lyndsay Belisle =

Canadian freestyle wrestler

Personal information
- Full name: Lyndsay Belisle
- Nationality: Canada
- Born: 1 October 1977 (age 48) Hazelton, British Columbia, Canada
- Height: 1.50 m (4 ft 11 in)
- Weight: 48 kg (106 lb)

Sport
- Style: Freestyle
- Club: BMWC Burnaby
- Coach: Mike Jones
Medal record
Women's freestyle wrestling
Representing Canada
Pan American Games
Silver medal – second place	2003 Santo Domingo	48 kg
World Championships
Silver medal – second place	2006 Guangzhou	51 kg

Lyndsay Belisle (born October 1, 1977, in Hazelton, British Columbia) is a retired amateur Canadian freestyle wrestler, who competed in the women's flyweight category. Considering one of the world's top female freestyle wrestlers in her decade, Belisle has claimed two silver medals each in the 48 and 51-kg division at the 2003 Pan American Games in Santo Domingo, Dominican Republic, and at the 2006 World Wrestling Championships in Guangzhou, China, and seized an opportunity to compete for Canada at the 2004 Summer Olympics. Throughout her sporting career, Belisle trained full-time for the Burnaby Mountain Wrestling Club in Burnaby, British Columbia under her personal coach Mike Jones.

Belisle made sporting headlines at the 2003 Pan American Games in Santo Domingo, Dominican Republic, where she captured a silver medal in the women's 48-kg division, losing to U.S. wrestler Patricia Miranda by a powerful pin.

When women's wrestling made its debut at the 2004 Summer Olympics in Athens, Belisle qualified for the Canadian squad in the inaugural 48 kg class. Earlier in the process, she outclassed Mongolia's Tsogtbazaryn Enkhjargal to snatch both the trophy and ticket from the Olympic Qualification Tournament in Madrid, Spain. She lost two straight matches each to Japan's Chiharu Icho on technical superiority, and Germany's Brigitte Wagner by a formidable 4–3 verdict, leaving her on the bottom of the prelim pool and placing eleventh in the final standings.

At the 2006 World Wrestling Championships in Guangzhou, China, Belisle grappled her way at three kilograms heavier to pick up a silver medal in the final match against Japan's Hitomi Sakamoto in the 51-kg division.
