= Fadhila Louati =

Tunisian wrestler (born 1979)

Personal information
- Full name: Fadhila Louati
- Nationality: Tunisia
- Born: 3 March 1979 (age 47) Tunis, Tunisia
- Height: 1.55 m (5 ft 1 in)
- Weight: 42 kg (93 lb)

Sport
- Style: Freestyle
- Club: Centre Integrer de Rades
- Coach: Noureddine Mefri
Medal record
Women's freestyle wrestling
Representing Tunisia
All-Africa Games
Gold medal – first place	1999 Johannesburg	46 kg
Gold medal – first place	2003 Abuja	48 kg
Mediterranean Games
Gold medal – first place	2001 Tunis	46 kg

Fadhila Louati (Arabic: فضيلة لواتي; born March 3, 1979, in Tunis) is a retired amateur Tunisian freestyle wrestler, who competed in the women's flyweight category. Considered one of the nation's top wrestlers in her decade, Louati has yielded a record of three gold medals in her career at the All-Africa Games (1999 and 2003), and at the 2001 Mediterranean Games in Tunis. She also had an opportunity to represent her nation Tunisia in the 48-kg division at the 2004 Summer Olympics, finishing fourteenth in the process. Louati is also a member of the wrestling squad for Centre Intégré de Radès in her native Tunis, under her personal coach Noureddine Mefri.

When Tunisia hosted the 2001 Mediterranean Games in Tunis, Louati emerged herself into a sporting fame, as she beat Greece's Agora Papavasiliou for the gold medal in the 46-kg division. Following her immediate sporting success, Louati went on to produce another boastful victory for the Tunisians for the women's flyweight title at the 2003 All-Africa Games in Abuja, Nigeria.

At the 2004 Summer Olympics in Athens, Louati qualified for her Tunisian squad, as a lone wrestler, in the inaugural 48 kg class. Earlier in the process, she placed fourth from the Olympic Qualification Tournament in Madrid, Spain, but managed to fill up an entry by the International Federation of Association Wrestling through a tripartite invitation. Louati lost two matches each to Greece's Fani Psatha and Tajikistan's Lidiya Karamchakova on technical fall, and was immediately halted by eventual Olympic champion Irini Merleni of Ukraine before reaching the two-minute mark due to a 10-point superiority rule, leaving her on the bottom of the prelim pool and placing last out of fourteen wrestlers in the final standings.
