= Maksym Lapyn =

Ukrainian diver

Personal information
- Nationality: Ukrainian
- Born: 27 July 1975
- Died: 11 April 2010 (aged 34)

Sport
- Sport: Diving

Maksym Lapyn (27 July 1975 – 11 April 2010) was a Ukrainian diver. He competed in the men's 3 metre springboard event at the 1996 Summer Olympics.
