= Katerina Izmailova (swimmer) =

Tajikistani swimmer

Personal information
- Nationality: Tajikistan
- Born: June 10, 1977 (age 49) Dushanbe, Tajik SSR, Soviet Union
- Height: 1.72 m (5 ft 7 1/2 in)
- Weight: 60 kg (132 lb)

Sport
- Sport: Swimming

Katerina Izmailova (born June 10, 1977) is a 3-time Olympic freestyle swimmer from Tajikistan. She competed for Tajikistan at the 2000, 2008 Olympics and 2012 Olympics.
