= Wrestling at the 2002 Asian Games – Women's freestyle 48 kg =

Women's freestyle 48 kg at the 2002 Asian Games
- Venue: Yangsan Gymnasium
- Date: 2–3 October 2002
- Competitors: 7 from 7 nations

Medalists
gold medal	Zhong Xiue	China
silver medal	Lidiya Karamchakova	Tajikistan
bronze medal	Tsogtbazaryn Enkhjargal	Mongolia

The women's freestyle 48 kilograms wrestling competition at the 2002 Asian Games in Busan was held on 2 October and 3 October at the Yangsan Gymnasium.

The competition held with an elimination system of three or four wrestlers in each pool, with the winners qualify for the final.

== Schedule ==
All times are Korea Standard Time (UTC+09:00)

Date	Time	Event
Wednesday, 2 October 2002	10:00	Round 1
Wednesday, 2 October 2002	16:00	Round 2
Wednesday, 2 October 2002	16:00	Round 3
Thursday, 3 October 2002	16:00	Finals

== Results ==
Legend

- F — Won by fall

=== Preliminary ===
==== Pool 1 ====
Pos	Athlete	Pld	W	L	CP	TP	Qualification
1	Lidiya Karamchakova (TJK)	2	2	0	7	13	Final
2	Tsogtbazaryn Enkhjargal (MGL)	2	1	1	5	13	3rd–4th place
3	Cristina Villanueva (PHI)	2	0	2	1	1	

Source: Report

	Score		CP
Lidiya Karamchakova (TJK)	6–1	Tsogtbazaryn Enkhjargal (MGL)	3–1 PP
Cristina Villanueva (PHI)	0–7 Fall	Lidiya Karamchakova (TJK)	0–4 TO
Tsogtbazaryn Enkhjargal (MGL)	12–1	Cristina Villanueva (PHI)	4–1 SP

==== Pool 2 ====
Pos	Athlete	Pld	W	L	CP	TP	Qualification
1	Zhong Xiue (CHN)	3	3	0	11	26	Final
2	Kamini Yadav (IND)	3	2	1	8	17	3rd–4th place
3	Kao Wei-chien (TPE)	3	1	2	5	11	
4	Altyn Muradowa (TKM)	3	0	3	0	4	

Source: Report

	Score		CP
Zhong Xiue (CHN)	6–2	Kamini Yadav (IND)	3–1 PP
Kao Wei-chien (TPE)	8–0 Fall	Altyn Muradowa (TKM)	4–0 TO
Zhong Xiue (CHN)	9–1 Fall	Kao Wei-chien (TPE)	4–0 TO
Kamini Yadav (IND)	10–4 Fall	Altyn Muradowa (TKM)	4–0 TO
Zhong Xiue (CHN)	11–0	Altyn Muradowa (TKM)	4–0 ST
Kamini Yadav (IND)	5–2	Kao Wei-chien (TPE)	3–1 PP

=== Final round ===
Final
Lidiya Karamchakova (TJK)	2
Zhong Xiue (CHN)	2^{F}

3rd–4th place
Tsogtbazaryn Enkhjargal (MGL)	5
Kamini Yadav (IND)	1

== Final standing ==
Rank	Athlete
1st place, gold medalist(s)	Zhong Xiue (CHN)
2nd place, silver medalist(s)	Lidiya Karamchakova (TJK)
3rd place, bronze medalist(s)	Tsogtbazaryn Enkhjargal (MGL)
4	Kamini Yadav (IND)
5	Kao Wei-chien (TPE)
6	Cristina Villanueva (PHI)
7	Altyn Muradowa (TKM)
