= Diving at the 1996 Summer Olympics – Men's 3 metre springboard =

Men's 3 metre springboard at the Games of the XXVI Olympiad
- Venue: Georgia Tech Aquatic Center
- Date: 28 July 1996 (qualifying round); 29 July 1996 (semi-final & final)
- Competitors: 39 from 27 nations

Medalists
1st place, gold medalist(s)		Xiong Ni	China
2nd place, silver medalist(s)		Yu Zhuocheng	China
3rd place, bronze medalist(s)		Mark Lenzi	United States

The men's 3 metre springboard was one of four diving events included in the Diving at the 1996 Summer Olympics programme.

The competition was split into three phases:

Preliminary round
29 July — Each diver performed a set number of dives without any limitation on the difficulty degree. The 18 divers with the highest total score advanced to the semi-final.
Semi-final
28 July — Each diver performed a set number of dives without any limitation on the difficulty degree. The 12 divers with the highest combined score from the semi-final and preliminary dives advanced to the final.
Final
29 July — Each diver performed a set number of dives, without limitation on the difficulty degree. The final ranking was determined by the combined score from the final and semi-final dives.

== Results ==
Rank	Diver	Nation	Preliminary		Semi-final				Final		
Rank	Diver	Nation	Points	Rank	Points	Rank	Total	Rank	Points	Rank	Total
1st place, gold medalist(s)	Xiong Ni	China	463.02	1	231.45	1	694.47	1	470.01	1	701.46
2nd place, silver medalist(s)	Yu Zhuocheng	China	438.93	2	223.41	5	662.34	2	467.52	2	690.93
3rd place, bronze medalist(s)	Mark Lenzi	United States	372.03	9	229.74	2	601.77	7	456.76	3	686.49
4	Scott Donie	United States	414.03	4	223.86	4	637.89	4	443.07	4	666.93
5	Dmitri Sautin	Russia	391.74	6	229.74	2	621.48	5	414.93	6	644.67
6	Michael Murphy	Australia	419.13	3	220.08	6	639.21	3	420.87	5	640.95
7	Jan Hempel	Germany	358.26	13	219.99	7	578.25	10	402.33	8	622.32
8	Fernando Platas	Mexico	382.83	8	217.62	8	600.45	8	402.36	7	619.98
9	Valery Statsenko	Russia	357.18	15	217.53	9	574.71	11	380.16	11	597.69
10	Andrey Semenyuk	Belarus	385.32	7	202.23	16	587.55	9	393.33	9	595.56
11	Roman Volod'kov	Ukraine	359.85	12	210.30	10	570.15	12	382.83	10	593.13
12	Andreas Wels	Germany	405.33	5	207.21	11	612.54	6	376.35	12	583.56
13	Evan Stewart	Zimbabwe	361.53	11	206.43	12	567.96	13	did not advance		
14	Richard Frece	Austria	365.73	10	197.91	17	563.64	14	did not advance		
15	Davide Lorenzini	Italy	356.55	16	202.80	15	559.35	15	did not advance		
16	Philippe Comtois	Canada	357.75	14	193.53	18	551.28	16	did not advance		
17	Imre Lengyel	Hungary	346.74	17	204.51	13	551.25	17	did not advance		
18	Tony Ally	Great Britain	345.33	18	203.46	14	548.79	18	did not advance		
19	David Bédard	Canada	342.33	19	did not advance						
20	Jimmy Sjödin	Sweden	339.93	20	did not advance						
21	Vyacheslav Khamulkin	Belarus	331.86	21	did not advance						
22	Joakim Andersson	Sweden	331.83	22	did not advance						
23	Maksym Lapyn	Ukraine	328.23	23	did not advance						
24	Bob Morgan	Great Britain	318.69	24	did not advance						
25	Dario di Fazio	Venezuela	317.04	25	did not advance						
26	Nikolaos Siranidis	Greece	316.50	26	did not advance						
27	Tony Iglesias	Bolivia	307.83	27	did not advance						
28	Russell Butler	Australia	305.79	28	did not advance						
29	Ramon Sandin	Puerto Rico	302.55	29	did not advance						
30	Joel Rodríguez	Mexico	296.91	30	did not advance						
31	José Miguel Gil	Spain	295.47	31	did not advance						
32	Lee Jong-hwa	South Korea	293.52	32	did not advance						
33	Ali Al-Hasan	Kuwait	272.40	33	did not advance						
34	Suchart Pichi	Thailand	257.13	34	did not advance						
35	Janaka Biyanwila	Sri Lanka	247.44	35	did not advance						
36	Rafael Álvarez	Spain	208.83	36	did not advance						
37	Chen Han-hung	Chinese Taipei	194.13	37	did not advance						
38	Siniša Žugić	FR Yugoslavia	181.17	38	did not advance						
39	Sergey Orin	Tajikistan	162.66	39	did not advance						

== Sources ==
- The Atlanta Committee for the Olympic Games (ACOG) (1997). The Official Report of the Centennial Olympic Games - Volume III: The Competition Results (pdf) (in English and French). Atlanta, GA: Peachtree Publishers. p. 31. ISBN 1-56145-169-X. OCLC 36994823.
