= Tajikistan at the 2016 Summer Olympics =

- IOC code: TJK
- NOC: National Olympic Committee of the Republic of Tajikistan
- Website: www.olympic.tj (in Tajik)

in Rio de Janeiro
- Competitors: 7 in 4 sports
- Flag bearer: Dilshod Nazarov
- Medals Ranked 54th: Gold 1 Silver 0 Bronze 0 Total 1

Summer Olympics appearances (overview)
- 1996; 2000; 2004; 2008; 2012; 2016; 2020; 2024

Other related appearances
- Russian Empire (1900–1912); Soviet Union (1952–1988); Unified Team (1992)

Tajikistan competed at the 2016 Summer Olympics in Rio de Janeiro, Brazil, from 5 to 21 August 2016. This was the nation's sixth consecutive appearance at the Summer Olympics in the post-Soviet era.

The National Olympic Committee of the Republic of Tajikistan sent the nation's smallest delegation to the Olympics since 2000. Seven athletes, five men and two women, were selected to the Tajikistan team across four different sports (athletics, boxing, judo, and swimming). For the first time since its official debut in 1996, Tajikistan did not register any of its athletes in wrestling at these Games.

Among the nation's athletes on the roster were London 2012 lightweight boxer Anvar Yunusov, 15-year-old freestyle swimmer Anastasia Tyurina, who made history as Tajikistan's youngest ever Olympian, and hammer thrower and reigning Asian Games champion Dilshod Nazarov, who became the first ever Tajikistani to compete in four successive Olympic Games. The oldest and most experienced participant (aged 30), Nazarov reprised his role to lead the Tajikistan delegation for the second time as the team captain and flag bearer in the opening ceremony, the first having done so eight years earlier in Beijing.

Tajikistan left Rio de Janeiro with a historic first Olympic gold medal, won by Nazarov.

== Medalists ==
Medal	Name	Sport	Event	Date
Gold	Dilshod Nazarov	Athletics	Men's hammer throw	20 August

== Athletics ==
Tajik athletes have so far achieved qualifying standards in the following athletics events (up to a maximum of 3 athletes in each event):

Key

- Note–Ranks given for track events are within the athlete's heat only
- Q = Qualified for the next round
- q = Qualified for the next round as a fastest loser or, in field events, by position without achieving the qualifying target
- NR = National record
- N/A = Round not applicable for the event
- Bye = Athlete not required to compete in round

Track & road events

Athlete	Event	Heat		Semifinal		Final	
Athlete	Event	Result	Rank	Result	Rank	Result	Rank
Kristina Pronzhenko	Women's 200 m	25.53	8	Did not advance			

Field events

Athlete	Event	Qualification		Final	
Athlete	Event	Distance	Position	Distance	Position
Dilshod Nazarov	Men's hammer throw	76.39	3 q	78.68	1st place, gold medalist(s)

== Boxing ==
Tajikistan entered one boxer to compete in the men's lightweight division in the Olympic boxing tournament. London 2012 Olympian Anvar Yunusov claimed his Olympic place with a quarterfinal victory at the 2016 AIBA World Qualifying Tournament in Baku, Azerbaijan.

Athlete	Event	Round of 32	Round of 16	Quarterfinals	Semifinals	Final	
Athlete	Event	Opposition Result	Opposition Result	Opposition Result	Opposition Result	Opposition Result	Rank
Anvar Yunusov	Men's lightweight	Shan J (CHN); W 3–0	Conceição (BRA); L TKO	Did not advance			

== Judo ==
Tajikistan qualified two judokas for each of the following weight classes at the Games: Men's -90kg and Men's +100 kg. Komronshokh Ustopiriyon was ranked among the top 22 eligible judokas for men in the IJF World Ranking List of May 30, 2016, while Mukhamadmurod Abdurakhmonov at men's half-heavyweight (+100 kg) earned a continental quota spot from the Asian region, as the highest-ranked Tajik judoka outside of direct qualifying position.

Athlete	Event	Round of 64	Round of 32	Round of 16	Quarterfinals	Semifinals	Repechage	Final / BM	
Athlete	Event	Opposition Result	Opposition Result	Opposition Result	Opposition Result	Opposition Result	Opposition Result	Opposition Result	Rank
Komronshokh Ustopiriyon	Men's −90 kg	Bye	Liparteliani (GEO); L 000–100	Did not advance					
Mukhamadmurod Abdurakhmonov	Men's +100 kg	—	García (CUB); L 000–100	Did not advance					

== Swimming ==
Tajikistan received a Universality invitation from FINA to send two swimmers (one male and one female) to the Olympics.

Athlete	Event	Heat		Semifinal		Final	
Athlete	Event	Time	Rank	Time	Rank	Time	Rank
Olim Qurbonov	Men's 50 m freestyle	25.77	62	Did not advance			
Anastasia Tyurina	Women's 50 m freestyle	31.15	73	Did not advance			
