= Tajikistan at the 2020 Summer Olympics =

- IOC code: TJK
- NOC: National Olympic Committee of the Republic of Tajikistan
- Website: www.olympic.tj (in Tajik)

in Tokyo, Japan July 23, 2021 – August 8, 2021
- Competitors: 10 in 4 sports
- Flag bearer (opening): Temur Rakhimov
- Flag bearer (closing): N/A
- Medals: Gold 0 Silver 0 Bronze 0 Total 0

Summer Olympics appearances (overview)
- 1996; 2000; 2004; 2008; 2012; 2016; 2020; 2024

Other related appearances
- Russian Empire (1900–1912); Soviet Union (1952–1988); Unified Team (1992)

Tajikistan competed at the 2020 Summer Olympics in Tokyo. Originally scheduled to take place from 24 July to 9 August 2020, the Games were postponed to 23 July to 8 August 2021, because of the COVID-19 pandemic. It was the nation's seventh consecutive appearance at the Summer Olympics in the post-Soviet era.

== Competitors ==
The following is the list of number of competitors in the Games.

Sport	Men	Women	Total
Athletics	1	0	1
Boxing	3	0	3
Judo	4	0	4
Swimming	1	1	2
Total	9	1	10

== Athletics ==
One Tajik athlete received a wildcard to enter the competitions:

Key

- Note–Ranks given for track events are within the athlete's heat only
- Q = Qualified for the next round
- q = Qualified for the next round as a fastest loser or, in field events, by position without achieving the qualifying target
- NR = National record
- N/A = Round not applicable for the event
- Bye = Athlete not required to compete in round

Track & road events

Athlete	Event	Heat		Quarterfinal		Semifinal		Final	
Athlete	Event	Result	Rank	Result	Rank	Result	Rank	Result	Rank
Ildar Akhmadiev	Men's 100 m	10.66 PB	4	Did not advance					

== Boxing ==
Tajikistan entered two male boxers into the Olympic tournament. Reigning Asian amateur champion Bakhodur Usmonov (men's lightweight) and Shabbos Negmatulloev (men's light heavyweight) secured the spots on the Tajik squad, by scoring a box-off triumph each in their respective weight divisions at the 2020 Asia & Oceania Qualification Tournament in Amman, Jordan.

Athlete	Event	Round of 32	Round of 16	Quarterfinals	Semifinals	Final	
Athlete	Event	Opposition Result	Opposition Result	Opposition Result	Opposition Result	Opposition Result	Rank
Bakhodur Usmonov	Men's lightweight	de los Santos (DOM); W 4–1	Abduraimov (UZB); L 0–5	Did not advance			
Shabbos Negmatulloev	Men's light heavyweight	Chen Dx (CHN); L 0–4	Did not advance				
Siyovush Zukhurov	Men's super heavyweight	Bye	Aliev (FRA); L 0–5	Did not advance			

== Judo ==
Tajikistan entered four judoka into the Olympic tournament based on the International Judo Federation Olympics Individual Ranking.

Athlete	Event	Round of 64	Round of 32	Round of 16	Quarterfinals	Semifinals	Repechage	Final / BM	
Athlete	Event	Opposition Result	Opposition Result	Opposition Result	Opposition Result	Opposition Result	Opposition Result	Opposition Result	Rank
Somon Makhmadbekov	Men's −73 kg	Alikaj (EOR); W 10–00	Njie (GAM); W 10–00	Orujov (AZE); L 00–01	Did not advance				
Akmal Murodov	Men's –81 kg	Andrew (GUM); W 10–00	Grigalashvili (GEO); L 00–11	Did not advance					
Komronshokh Ustopiriyon	Men's −90 kg	Bye	Clerget (FRA); L 00–10	Did not advance					
Temur Rakhimov	Men's +100 kg	—	Granda (CUB); W 01–00	Tushishvili (GEO); L 00–10	Did not advance				

== Swimming ==
Tajikistan received a universality invitation from FINA to send two top-ranked swimmers (one per gender) in their respective individual events to the Olympics, based on the FINA Points System of June 28, 2021.

Athlete	Event	Heat		Semifinal		Final	
Athlete	Event	Time	Rank	Time	Rank	Time	Rank
Olimjon Ishanov	Men's 50 m freestyle	26.12	60	Did not advance			
Anastasiya Tyurina	Women's 50 m freestyle	29.05	62	Did not advance			
