= Lee Jong-hwa (diver) =

South Korean diver

Personal information
- Nationality: South Korean
- Born: 28 April 1974 (age 50)

Sport
- Sport: Diving

Lee Jong-hwa (born 28 April 1974) is a South Korean diver. He competed in the men's 3 metre springboard event at the 1996 Summer Olympics.
