= Li Xiaomei =

Chinese freestyle wrestler (born 1987)

Li Xiaomei (born August 20, 1987, in Dongguan, Guangdong) is a Chinese female freestyle wrestler. She competed at the 2008 Summer Olympics.

Her personal best was coming 3rd at the 2007 World Championships.
