= 2005 European Wrestling Championships =

2005 in Bulgarian sport

- Host city: Varna, Bulgaria
- Dates: 12–17 April 2005

Champions
- Freestyle: Ukraine
- Greco-Roman: Russia
- Women: Russia

The 2005 European Wrestling Championships was held from 12 to 17 April 2005 in Varna, Bulgaria.

== Medal table ==
Rank	Nation	Gold	Silver	Bronze	Total
1	Russia	5	4	5	14
2	Ukraine	4	1	3	8
3	Bulgaria	3	2	3	8
4	Turkey	1	3	3	7
5	Belarus	1	1	4	6
6	Poland	1	1	2	4
7	Germany	1	1	1	3
8	Armenia	1	1	0	2
8	Azerbaijan	1	1	0	2
8	Sweden	1	1	0	2
11	Georgia	1	0	4	5
12	Moldova	1	0	0	1
13	France	0	4	3	7
14	Romania	0	1	2	3
15	Greece	0	0	3	3
16	Lithuania	0	0	2	2
16	Spain	0	0	2	2
18	Austria	0	0	1	1
18	Croatia	0	0	1	1
18	Hungary	0	0	1	1
18	Italy	0	0	1	1
18	North Macedonia	0	0	1	1
Totals (22 entries)		21	21	42	84

== Medal summary ==
=== Men's freestyle ===
Event	Gold	Silver	Bronze
55 kg	(Moldova) Ghenadie Tulbea	(Bulgaria) Radoslav Velikov	(Russia) Alexandr Kontoyev
55 kg	(Moldova) Ghenadie Tulbea	(Bulgaria) Radoslav Velikov	(Georgia (country)) Besarion Gochashvili
60 kg	(Ukraine) Vasyl Fedoryshyn	(France) Didier Païs	(North Macedonia) Murad Ramazanov
60 kg	(Ukraine) Vasyl Fedoryshyn	(France) Didier Païs	(Poland) Łukasz Góral
66 kg	(Bulgaria) Serafim Barzakov	(Azerbaijan) Elman Asgarov	(Ukraine) Andri Stadnik
66 kg	(Bulgaria) Serafim Barzakov	(Azerbaijan) Elman Asgarov	(Belarus) Albert Batyrov
74 kg	(Bulgaria) Nikolai Paslar	(Russia) Serguei Vitkovski	(Turkey) Ahmet Gülhan
74 kg	(Bulgaria) Nikolai Paslar	(Russia) Serguei Vitkovski	(Ukraine) Volodymyr Syrotin
84 kg	(Ukraine) Taras Danko	(Turkey) Serhat Balcı	(Greece) Lázaros Loizidis
84 kg	(Ukraine) Taras Danko	(Turkey) Serhat Balcı	(Russia) Nauruz Temrezov
96 kg	(Georgia (country)) Eldar Kurtanidze	(France) Vincent Aka-Akesse	(Russia) Khadzhimurat Gatsalov
96 kg	(Georgia (country)) Eldar Kurtanidze	(France) Vincent Aka-Akesse	(Turkey) Fatih Çakıroğlu
120 kg	(Russia) Kuramagomed Kuramagomedov	(Ukraine) Vadym Tasoyev	(Greece) Efstathios Topalidis
120 kg	(Russia) Kuramagomed Kuramagomedov	(Ukraine) Vadym Tasoyev	(Hungary) Ottó Aubéli

=== Men's Greco-Roman ===
Event	Gold	Silver	Bronze
55 kg	(Russia) Viktor Korabliov	(Armenia) Roman Amoyan	(Bulgaria) Ivo Anguelov
55 kg	(Russia) Viktor Korabliov	(Armenia) Roman Amoyan	(Turkey) Bayram Özdemir
60 kg	(Azerbaijan) Vitaliy Rahimov	(Romania) Eusebiu Diaconu	(Russia) Alexei Shevtsov
60 kg	(Azerbaijan) Vitaliy Rahimov	(Romania) Eusebiu Diaconu	(Georgia (country)) Davit Bedinadze
66 kg	(Bulgaria) Nikolay Gergov	(Germany) Christian Fetzer	(Spain) Moisés Sánchez
66 kg	(Bulgaria) Nikolay Gergov	(Germany) Christian Fetzer	(Russia) Sergey Kovalenko
74 kg	(Armenia) Movses Karapetian	(Bulgaria) Velin Marinov	(Croatia) Neven Žugaj
74 kg	(Armenia) Movses Karapetian	(Bulgaria) Velin Marinov	(Germany) Adam Juretzko
84 kg	(Russia) Alexei Mishin	(Turkey) Serkan Özden	(Lithuania) Laimutis Adomaitis
84 kg	(Russia) Alexei Mishin	(Turkey) Serkan Özden	(Georgia (country)) Badri Jasaia
96 kg	(Turkey) Hamza Yerlikaya	(Sweden) Jimmy Lidberg	(Lithuania) Mindaugas Ežerskis
96 kg	(Turkey) Hamza Yerlikaya	(Sweden) Jimmy Lidberg	(Ukraine) Dimitriy Timchenko
120 kg	(Belarus) Siarhei Artsiukhin	(Turkey) Yekta Yılmaz Gül	(Georgia (country)) Mirian Guiorgadze
120 kg	(Belarus) Siarhei Artsiukhin	(Turkey) Yekta Yılmaz Gül	(Bulgaria) Krasimir Kochev

=== Women's freestyle ===
Event	Gold	Silver	Bronze
48 kg	(Russia) Lorissa Oorzhak	(Poland) Iwona Matkowska	(France) Anne-Catherine Deluntsch
48 kg	(Russia) Lorissa Oorzhak	(Poland) Iwona Matkowska	(Greece) Faní Psathá
51 kg	(Ukraine) Iryna Merleni	(Russia) Natalia Smirnova	(France) Vanessa Boubryemm
51 kg	(Ukraine) Iryna Merleni	(Russia) Natalia Smirnova	(Romania) Ana Maria Pavăl
55 kg	(Russia) Natalia Golts	(France) Anna Gomis	(Belarus) Mariya Yahorava
55 kg	(Russia) Natalia Golts	(France) Anna Gomis	(Poland) Sylwia Bileńska
59 kg	(Sweden) Ida-Theres Karlsson	(France) Audrey Prieto	(Belarus) Yuliya Ratkevich
59 kg	(Sweden) Ida-Theres Karlsson	(France) Audrey Prieto	(Italy) Diletta Giampiccolo
63 kg	(Poland) Monika Michalik	(Belarus) Volha Jilko	(Austria) Nikola Hartmann
63 kg	(Poland) Monika Michalik	(Belarus) Volha Jilko	(Romania) Mihaela Panait
67 kg	(Ukraine) Kateryna Burmistrova	(Russia) Yelena Perepiolkina	(France) Lise Legrand
67 kg	(Ukraine) Kateryna Burmistrova	(Russia) Yelena Perepiolkina	(Spain) María Teresa Méndez
72 kg	(Germany) Anita Schätzle	(Russia) Svetlana Martinenko	(Belarus) Vasilisa Marzaliuk
72 kg	(Germany) Anita Schätzle	(Russia) Svetlana Martinenko	(Bulgaria) Stanka Zlateva
