= Sergey Orin =

Tajikistani diver

Personal information
- Nationality: Tajikistani
- Born: 17 August 1978 (age 46)

Sport
- Sport: Diving

Sergey Orin (born 17 August 1978) is a Tajikistani diver. He competed in the men's 3 metre springboard event at the 1996 Summer Olympics.
