= Brigitte Wagner =

German freestyle wrestler

Personal information
- Full name: Brigitte Wagner
- Nationality: Germany
- Born: 22 November 1983 (age 42) Freising, West Germany
- Height: 1.57 m (5 ft 2 in)
- Weight: 53 kg (117 lb)

Sport
- Style: Freestyle
- Club: SV Siegfried
- Coach: Jürgen Scheibe
Medal record
Women's freestyle wrestling
Representing Germany
World Championships
Gold medal – first place	2002 Chalcis	48 kg
Bronze medal – third place	2001 Sofia	46 kg
European Championships
Gold medal – first place	2003 Riga	47 kg
Silver medal – second place	2002 Seinäjoki	47 kg
Bronze medal – third place	2007 Sofia	48 kg

Brigitte Wagner (born November 22, 1983, in Freising, West Germany) is a retired amateur German freestyle wrestler, who competed in the women's flyweight category. Considering one of the world's top female freestyle wrestlers in her decade, Wagner has claimed a gold and a silver medal in the 48-kg division at the World Championships, and seized an opportunity to compete for Germany at the 2004 Summer Olympics. Throughout her sporting career, Wagner trained full-time as a member of the wrestling squad for Siegfried Sports Club in Hallbergmoos, under her coach and four-time Olympian Jürgen Scheibe.

Wagner made sporting headlines, as an 18-year-old teen, at the 2001 World Wrestling Championships in Sofia, Bulgaria, where she took home the bronze medal in the women's 46-kg division. Wagner's early success in wrestling blossomed her career, as she dominated both the 2002 World and 2003 European Championships with two unprecedented gold medals produced in her hardware.

When women's wrestling made its debut at the 2004 Summer Olympics in Athens, Wagner seized her opportunity to compete in the inaugural 48 kg class. Earlier in the process, she outclassed Russia's Liliya Kaskarakova to snatch both the trophy and Olympic ticket from the Olympic Qualification Tournament in Tunis, Tunisia. She was powerfully pinned by Japan's Chiharu Icho with only two seconds left in the second period during her opening match, but managed to score a 4–3 sudden-death victory over Canada's Lyndsay Belisle in the prelim pool. Despite missing a spot for the semifinals, Wagner wrestled her way to pin Mongolia's Tsogtbazaryn Enkhjargal in a consolation round, before losing out to Russia's Lorisa Oorzhak with a 1–3 decision for a fifth-place finish.
