= Fani Psatha =

Greek freestyle wrestler

Personal information
- Full name: Fani Psatha
- Nationality: Greece
- Born: 2 February 1976 (age 50) Psachna, Euboea, Greece
- Height: 1.50 m (4 ft 11 in)
- Weight: 48 kg (106 lb)

Sport
- Style: Freestyle
- Club: Psachna Evia Wrestling Club
- Coach: Ioannis Tabounidis
Medal record
Women's freestyle wrestling
Representing Greece
Mediterranean Games
Gold medal – first place	2005 Almería	48 kg
European Championships
Silver medal – second place	2006 Moscow	48 kg
Bronze medal – third place	2005 Varna	48 kg

Fani Psatha (Greek: Φανή Ψαθά; born February 2, 1976, in Psachna, Euboea) is a retired amateur Greek freestyle wrestler, who competed in the women's flyweight category. Psatha has produced a full set of three career medals in different color, including her prestigious gold from the 2005 Mediterranean Games in Almería, Spain, and also finished tenth in the 48-kg division in Athens, when Greece hosted the 2004 Summer Olympics. Psatha trained throughout her sporting career for Psachna Evia Wrestling Club in Chalcis, under her personal coach Ioannis Tabounidis.

Psatha qualified for the Greek squad, as a 28-year-old, in the inaugural 48 kg class at the 2004 Summer Olympics in Athens. Earlier in the process, she placed fourth from the 2003 World Wrestling Championships in New York City, New York, United States, but managed to fill up an entry by the International Federation of Association Wrestling and the Hellenic Olympic Committee, as Greece received an automatic berth for being the host nation. Psatha began the preliminary competition early by pinning Tunisia's Fadhila Louati with only forty seconds left in front of the boisterous home crowd inside Ano Liossia Olympic Hall. She lost her succeeding match 3–5 in overtime to Tajikistan's Lidiya Karamchakova, and was immediately halted by Ukraine's Irini Merleni at the one-minute mark due to a 10–point superiority rule. Psatha placed third in the preliminary competition and tenth overall; She did not advance to the quarterfinals.

At the 2005 Mediterranean Games in Almería, Spain, Psatha overcame her Olympic setback to edge France's Anne Deluntsch off the mat for the gold medal in the same class.
