= Mayelis Caripá =

Venezuelan freestyle wrestler

Personal information
- Nationality: Venezuela
- Born: 16 August 1980 (age 45) Valencia, Carabobo

Sport
- Sport: Wrestling
- Event: Freestyle
Medal record
Women's freestyle wrestling
Representing Venezuela

Mayelis Yesenia Caripá Castillo (born 16 August 1980 in Valencia) is a Venezuelan freestyle wrestler. She competed at the 2004, 2008 and 2012 Summer Olympics.

In 2004, she did not get out of her pool in the 48 kg freestyle event. At the 2008 Summer Olympics, she lost to Vanessa Boubryemm in the first round of the 48 kg event. She competed in the freestyle 48 kg event at the 2012 Summer Olympics; she defeated Alexandra Engelhardt in the 1/8 finals and was eliminated by Irini Merleni in the quarterfinals.
