= Tajikistan at the 1996 Summer Olympics =

- IOC code: TJK
- NOC: National Olympic Committee of the Republic of Tajikistan
- Website: www.olympic.tj (in Tajik)

in Atlanta
- Competitors: 8 in 5 sports
- Flag bearer: Andrey Abduvaliyev
- Medals: Gold 0 Silver 0 Bronze 0 Total 0

Summer Olympics appearances (overview)
- 1996; 2000; 2004; 2008; 2012; 2016; 2020; 2024

Other related appearances
- Russian Empire (1900–1912); Soviet Union (1952–1988); Unified Team (1992)

Tajikistan competed in the Summer Olympic Games as an independent nation for the first time at the 1996 Summer Olympics in Atlanta, United States. Previously, Tajik athletes competed for the Unified Team at the 1992 Summer Olympics.

== Athletics ==
Women
Track

Athlete	Event	Final	
Athlete	Event	Result	Rank
Gulsara Dadabayeva	Marathon	3:09:06	61

== Boxing ==
Athlete	Event	Round of 32	Round of 16	Quarterfinals	Semifinals	Final	
Athlete	Event	Opposition Result	Opposition Result	Opposition Result	Opposition Result	Opposition Result	Rank
Khurshed Hasanov	Bantamweight	Aweda (NGR); W	Kovács (HUN); L 3–17	did not advance			

== Diving ==
Men

Athlete	Event	Preliminaries		Semifinals		Final	
Athlete	Event	Points	Rank	Points	Rank	Points	Rank
Sergey Orin	3 m springboard	162.66	39	did not advance			

Women

Athlete	Event	Preliminaries		Semifinals		Final	
Athlete	Event	Points	Rank	Points	Rank	Points	Rank
Nataliya Shlemova	3 m springboard	180.54	29	did not advance			

== Judo ==
Athlete	Event	Preliminary	Round of 32	Round of 16	Quarterfinals	Semifinals	Final / BM	
Athlete	Event	Opposition Result	Opposition Result	Opposition Result	Opposition Result	Opposition Result	Opposition Result	Rank
Rustam Boqiev	Men's −60 kg	Bye	Chorfi (MAR); L	did not advance				
Khayrullo Nazriev	Men's −95 kg	Bye	Guido (ITA); L	did not advance				
Saidahtam Rahimov	Men's +95 kg	Bye	Baccino (ARG); W	Krieger (AUT); L	did not advance			

== Wrestling ==
Greco–Roman

Athlete	Event	Round 1	Round 2	Round 3	Round 4	Round 5	Final / BM	
Athlete	Event	Opposition Result	Opposition Result	Opposition Result	Opposition Result	Opposition Result	Opposition Result	Rank
Raoul Dgvareli	+130 kg	Kotok (UKR); L 0-5	Díaz (MEX); W 4-2	Johl (CAN); W 2-0	Suzuki (CUB); L 0-8	did not advance		9
