= Nargis Nabieva =

Tajikistani archer

Narguis Nabieva (born 20 February 1985) is an athlete from Tajikistan. She competes in archery.

Nabieva represented Tajikistan at the 2004 Summer Olympics. She placed 55th in the women's individual ranking round with a 72-arrow score of 600. In the first round of elimination, she faced 10th-ranked Wu Hui Ju of Chinese Taipei. Nabieva lost 156-142 in the 18-arrow match, placing 45th overall in women's individual archery.
