= Kyla Bremner =

Australian freestyle wrestler

Personal information
- Born: Kyla Bremner; 28 January 1977 Powell River, British Columbia
- Height: 158 cm (5 ft 2 in)
- Weight: 48 kg (106 lb)

Sport
- Style: Freestyle wrestling
- Club: Sydney University Wrestling Club

Kyla Bremner (born 28 January 1977 in Powell River, British Columbia, Canada) is an Australian freestyle wrestler. She competed for Australia at the 2008 Olympics. She lost to Korean Hyung-Joo Kim in the first round and was eliminated.
