= Hitomi Obara =

Japanese sport wrestler (1981–2025)

- Obara at the 2012 Summer Olympics

Medal record

Women's freestyle wrestling

Representing Japan

Olympic Games
Gold medal – first place	2012 London	48 kg

World Championships
Gold medal – first place	2000 Sofia	51 kg
Gold medal – first place	2001 Sofia	51 kg
Gold medal – first place	2005 Budapest	51 kg
Gold medal – first place	2006 Guangzhou	51 kg
Gold medal – first place	2007 Baku	51 kg
Gold medal – first place	2008 Tokyo	51 kg
Gold medal – first place	2010 Moscow	48 kg
Gold medal – first place	2011 Istanbul	48 kg

Asian Games
Bronze medal – third place	2010 Guangzhou	48 kg

Asian Championships
Gold medal – first place	2000 Seoul	51 kg
Gold medal – first place	2005 Wuhan	51 kg

Hitomi Obara née Sakamoto (小原 日登美, Obara Hitomi; 4 January 1981 – 18 July 2025) was a Japanese female wrestler from Hachinohe, Aomori. She was Captain in the Japan Ground Self-Defense Force. On 8 August 2012, Obara won the women's 48kg freestyle wrestling gold in her first Olympic Games at London's Excel Arena.

She had retired from competitive wrestling after winning the gold medal at the London Olympics.

Hitomi Obara died on 18 July 2025, at the age of 44. She had previously been diagnosed with depression and an eating disorder.

== Awards ==
- Tokyo Sports
  - Wrestling Special Award (2000, 2001, 2005, 2006, 2011, 2012)
