= Alisher Qudratov =

Tajikistani alpine skier (born 1986)

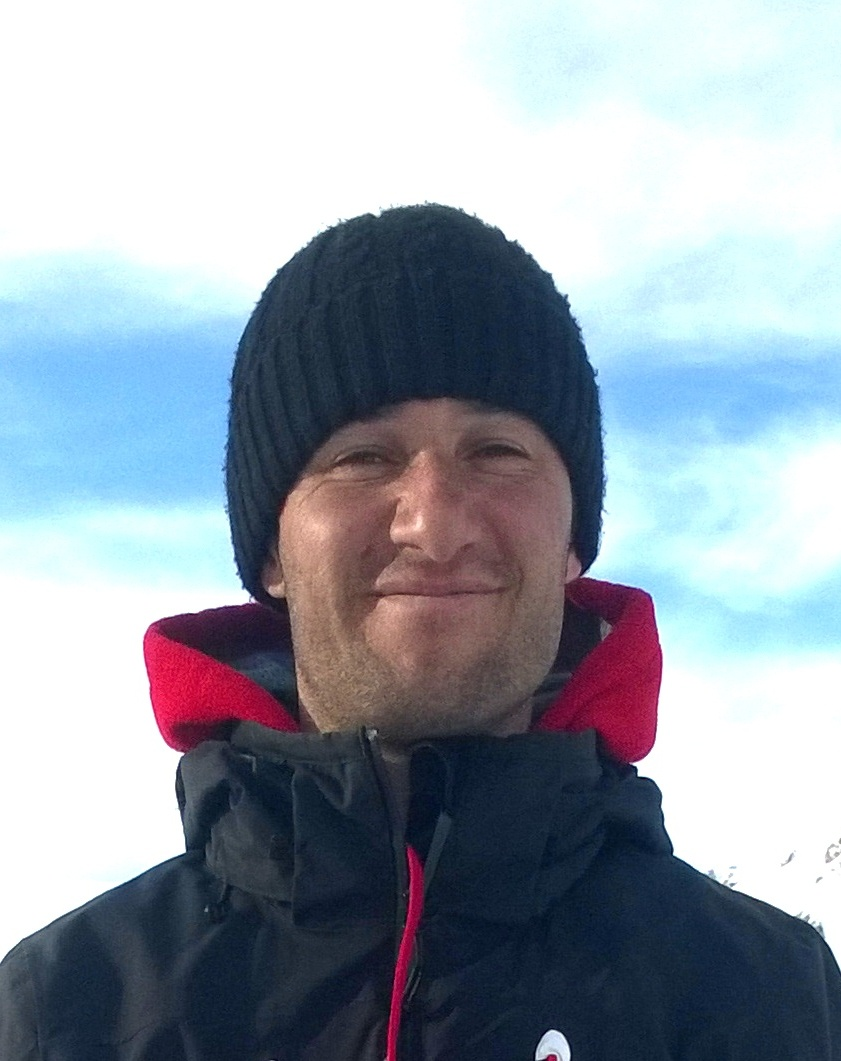
Alisher Qudratov

Alisher Qudratov (Tajik: Алишер Қудратов; born 11 January 1986, in Varzob) is an alpine skier from Tajikistan. Kudratov was Tajikistan's flag bearer during the 2010 Winter Olympics opening ceremony despite not being slated to compete in the Games themselves. He competed at the 2014 Winter Olympics in Sochi, Russia. He also carried the Tajik flag during the opening ceremony in Sochi.
