= Patricia Miranda =

American freestyle wrestler (born 1979)

Personal information
- Born: June 11, 1979 (age 47) Manteca, California, United States

Sport
- Sport: Freestyle wrestling
Medal record
Women's freestyle wrestling
Representing the United States
Olympic Games
Bronze medal – third place	2004 Athens	48 kg
World Championships
Silver medal – second place	2000 Sofia	51 kg
Silver medal – second place	2003 New York	48 kg
Bronze medal – third place	2006 Guangzhou	51 kg
World Cup
Gold medal – first place	2003 Tokyo	51 kg
Gold medal – first place	2007 Krasnoyarsk	51 kg
Pan American Games
Gold medal – first place	2003 Santo Domingo	48 kg

Patricia Noriko Miranda (born June 11, 1979) is a former American collegiate wrestler. She became the first American woman in Olympic history to receive a medal in woman's Olympic wrestling, winning the bronze at the 2004 Summer Olympics in the 48 kg or 106 lb weight class.

As the daughter of political refugees from Brazil, Miranda began her wrestling career at age eleven by becoming the first female to wrestle at Redwood Middle School and Saratoga High School. Her father initially opposed her wrestling and once threatened to sue her high school for allowing his daughter to wrestle on the boys' team. He eventually allowed her to wrestle as long as she maintained a 4.0 grade point average.

She continued wrestling at Stanford University and eventually earned a spot on the all-male NCAA Division 1 roster as a 125-pound starter. During her senior year, Miranda became only the second woman in NCAA history to beat a male opponent in competition and the first in more than a decade to do so at the time. In female competition, Miranda has had strong success including two World Championship silver medals and an Olympic bronze medal.

Miranda earned a bachelor's degree in Economics and a Master’s in International Policy Studies from Stanford University. In 2005, she won a highly competitive The Paul & Daisy Soros Fellowships for New Americans to help support her graduate studies in law. In 2007, she received her Juris Doctor from Yale Law School. Her coach and husband, Levi Weikel-Magden, is also a law school graduate, earning his degree at the University of Virginia. She is currently a partner at Miranda, Magden & Miranda LLP.

== Career Highlights and Honors ==
Olympic Games
Bronze Medal – Freestyle – 48 kg 2004 – Athens, Greece
World Championships
Bronze Medal – Freestyle – 51 kg 2006 – China
Silver Medal – Freestyle – 48 kg 2003 – New York, NY, United States
Silver Medal – Freestyle – 51 kg 2000 – Sofia, Bulgaria
World Cup Championships
Gold Medal – Freestyle – 51 kg 2007 – Krasnoyarsk, Russia
Gold Medal – Freestyle – 51 kg 2003
(Named Most Outstanding Wrestler, 2003)
Pan American Games
Gold Medal – Freestyle – 48 kg 2003 – Santa Domingo, Dominican Republic

=== Honors ===
Miranda was inducted as a Distinguished Member of the National Wrestling Hall of Fame in 2023
