= Lorisa Oorzhak =

Russian freestyle wrestler (born 1985)

Medal record

Women's wrestling

Representing Russia

World Championships
Silver medal – second place	2009 Herning	48 kg
Silver medal – second place	2010 Moscow	48 kg

European Championships
Gold medal – first place	2005 Varna	48 kg
Gold medal – first place	2007 Sofia	48 kg
Gold medal – first place	2010 Baku	48 kg

Lorisa Byurbyuyevna Oorzhak (Russian: Лориса Бюрбюевна Ооржак; born August 10, 1985) is a female wrestler from Russia.
