= Chiharu Icho =

Japanese freestyle wrestler

Medal record

Women's freestyle wrestling

Representing Japan

Olympic Games
Silver medal – second place	2004 Athens	48 kg
Silver medal – second place	2008 Beijing	48 kg

World Championships
Gold medal – first place	2003 New York City	51 kg
Gold medal – first place	2006 Guangzhou	48 kg
Gold medal – first place	2007 Baku	48 kg

Chiharu Icho (伊調 千春, Ichō Chiharu; born October 6, 1981 in Hachinohe, Aomori) is a Japanese wrestler who competed in the 48 kg weight class at the 2004 and 2008 Summer Olympics, winning the silver medal at both Games.

Her younger sister Kaori is also a wrestler who competed in the 63 kg weight class at the 2004, 2008, 2012 and 2016 Summer Olympics, winning the gold medal in her event at each of the four Olympics.

Chiharu has won the Asian Championship twice and the World Championships three times.

== Awards ==
- Tokyo Sports
  - Wrestling Special Award (2003, 2004, 2006)
