= Tsogtbazaryn Enkhjargal =

Mongolian freestyle wrestler

Personal information
- Full name: Tsogtbazaryn Enkhjargal
- Nationality: (Mongolia) Mongol
- Born: 6 April 1981 (age 45) Erdenebüren sum, Khovd aimag, Mongolia
- Height: 1.53 m (5 ft 0 in)
- Weight: 48 kg (106 lb)

Sport
- Style: Freestyle
- Club: Zamchin Wrestling Club
- Coach: Se Dubcin
Medal record
Women's freestyle wrestling
Representing Mongolia
World Championships
Bronze medal – third place	2005 Budapest	51 kg
Asian Games
Bronze medal – third place	2002 Busan	48 kg
Bronze medal – third place	2006 Doha	48 kg
Asian Championships
Gold medal – first place	2004 Tokyo	51 kg
Gold medal – first place	2007 Bishkek	48 kg
Silver medal – second place	2001 Ulaanbaatar	46 kg
Silver medal – second place	2003 New Delhi	51 kg
Silver medal – second place	2011 Tashkent	48 kg
Bronze medal – third place	2005 Wuhan	51 kg
FILA World Team Championships
Silver medal – second place	2013 Ulaanbaatar	48 kg

Tsogtbazaryn Enkhjargal (Mongolian: Цогтбазарын Энхжаргал; born April 6, 1981, in Erdenebüren sum, Khovd aimag) is an amateur Mongolian freestyle wrestler, who competed in the women's flyweight category. Between 2001 and 2011, Enkhjargal had won a total of six medals (two golds, three silver, and one bronze) for the 46, 48, and 51 kg classes at the Asian Wrestling Championships. She also captured three bronze medals in the same division at the Asian Games (2002 in Busan, South Korea and 2006 in Doha, Qatar), and at the 2005 World Wrestling Championships in Budapest, Hungary.

Enkhjargal made her official debut for the 2004 Summer Olympics in Athens, where she placed second in the preliminary pool of the women's 48 kg class, against France's Angélique Berthenet, and Guinea-Bissau's Leopoldina Ross. Tsogtbazar, however, lost to Germany's Brigitte Wagner in the quarterfinal match, with a score of 0–3.

Four years after competing in her last Olympics, Enkhjargal qualified for her second Mongolian team, as a 27-year-old, at the 2008 Summer Olympics in Beijing, by claiming the gold medal in the flyweight division from the 2007 Asian Wrestling Championships in Bishkek, Kyrgyzstan. Enkhjargal received a bye for the second preliminary round of the women's 48 kg class, before she was pinned by Ukrainian wrestler and Olympic bronze medalist Iryna Merleni.
