= Andrei Drygin =

Tajikistani alpine skier (born 1977)

Andrei Sergeyevich Drygin (Russian: Андре́й Сергее́вич Дры́гин; born 12 June 1977 in Krasnoyarsk, Russian SFSR), is a Tajikistani alpine skier, originating from Russian family that emigrated to Tajikistan.

Drygin was the flag-bearer and only representative of Tajikistan at the 2002 and 2006 Winter Olympics. He also competed at the 2010 Winter Olympics in Vancouver as the only competitor again but was not the flag bearer. In 2002, he competed in the giant slalom and Super-G, and failed to finish in either event. In 2006, he finished 51st in the downhill event, with a time of 1:59.41, failed to finish the giant slalom, and finished 51st in the Super-G, with a time of 1:37.85.
