= Iryna Merleni =

Ukrainian wrestler (born 1982)

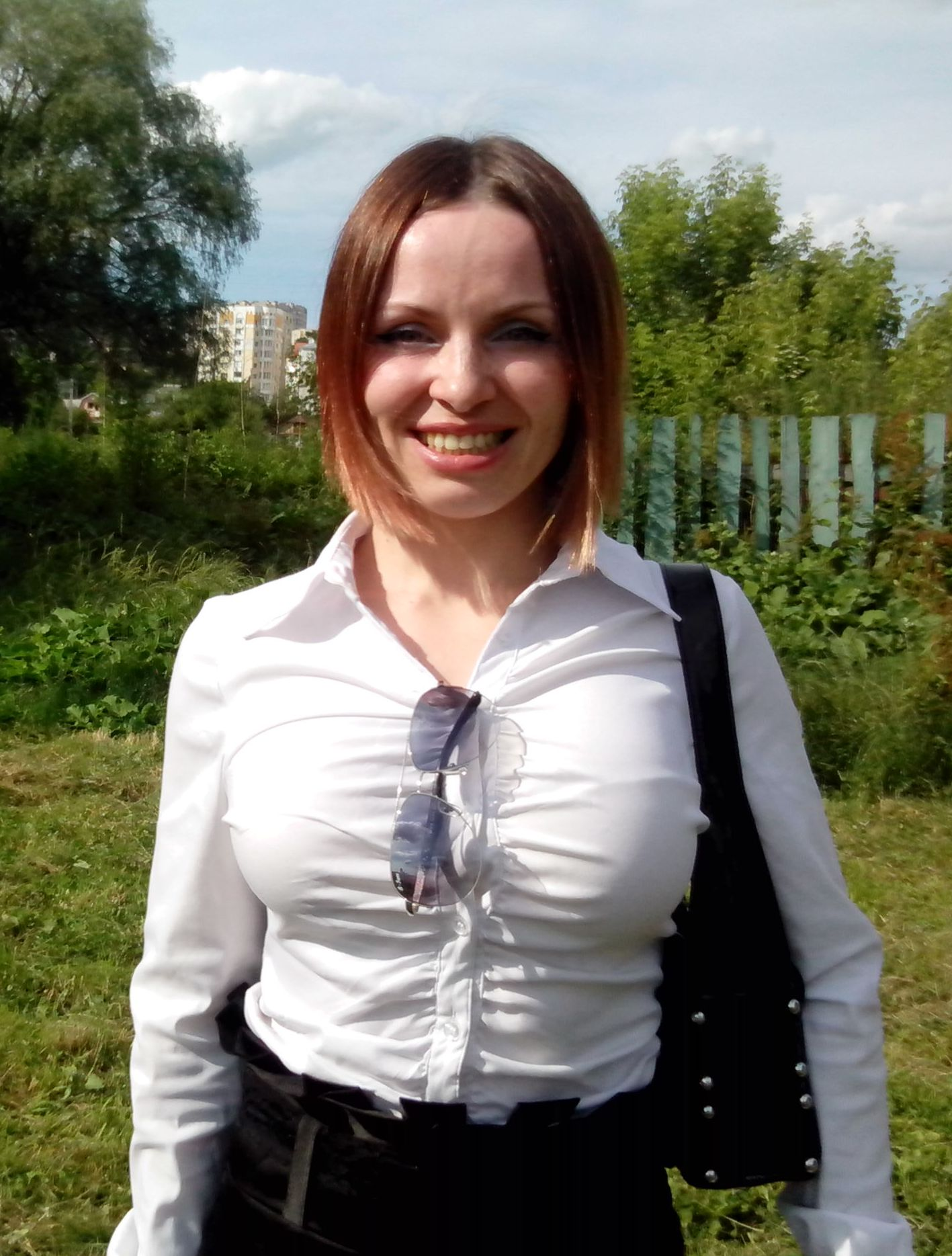
- Merleni in 2014

Personal information
- Native name: Ірина Олексіївна; Мельник / Мерлені / Микульчин
- Full name: Iryna Oleksiyivna; Melnyk / Merleni / Mykulchyn
- Born: 8 February 1982 (age 44) Kamianets-Podilskyi, Khmelnytskyi Oblast, Ukrainian SSR, Soviet Union
Medal record
Women's freestyle wrestling
Representing Ukraine
Olympic Games
| Gold medal – first place | 2004 Athens | 48 kg |
| Bronze medal – third place | 2008 Beijing | 48 kg |
World Championships
| Gold medal – first place | 2000 Sofia | 46 kg |
| Gold medal – first place | 2001 Sofia | 46 kg |
| Gold medal – first place | 2003 New York | 48 kg |
| Silver medal – second place | 2005 Budapest | 48 kg |
| Silver medal – second place | 2007 Baku | 48 kg |
European Championships
| Gold medal – first place | 2004 Haparanda | 48 kg |
| Gold medal – first place | 2005 Varna | 51 kg |
| Silver medal – second place | 2001 Budapest | 46 kg |
Summer Universiade
| Gold medal – first place | 2005 İzmir | 51 kg |

Iryna Oleksiyivna Merleni (Ukrainian: Ірина Олексіївна Мерлені), née Melnyk (Мельник), married name Mykulchyn (Микульчин) (born 8 February 1982) is a Ukrainian wrestler, who competed in the – 48 kg weight class at the 2004 Summer Olympics and claimed the gold medal. She is first female olympic champion in women`s wrestling. In the same event at the 2008 Summer Olympics, she won a bronze medal. She is a three-time world champion, and has also won the European Championships once.

Merleni was born in Kamianets-Podilskyi, Khmelnytskyi Oblast. In February 2006, she married Andriy Mykulchyn, with whom she has two sons – Artur and Adam. She was inducted into the Women's Wrestling Hall of Fame in 2023.

Due to the Russian invasion of Ukraine she fled to Haparanda, Sweden, where she now works at the local Systembolaget. In her spare time she acts as a wrestling coach for the club Haparanda SKT.

== Championships and accomplishments ==
- Women's Wrestling Hall of Fame
  - Class of 2023
