= National Olympic Committee of the Republic of Tajikistan =

National Olympic Committee

- Country: Tajikistan
- Code: TJK
- Created: 1992
- Recognized: 1993
- Continental Association: OCA
- Headquarters: Dushanbe, Tajikistan
- President: Emomalii Rahmon
- Secretary General: Bahrullo Radhzabaliev
- Website: www.olympic.tj

old logo

The National Olympic Committee of the Republic of Tajikistan (NOC) is a sports governing body that was established in 1992 to manage Tajikistan's activities in relation to the Olympics. The office of the NOC is located in the center of the city, on Aini Street in Dushanbe.

The current National Olympic Committee of Tajikistan is headed by Bakhrullo Radzhabaliev (President) and Shirinjon Mamadsafoev (Secretary General).

Tajikistan made its debut as an independent nation at the 1996 Olympic Games in Atlanta, United States. The 2008 Beijing Olympic Games marked the country's fourth appearance and first Olympic medal wins, with Rasul Boqiev winning bronze in the Judo under 73 kg category and Yusup Abdusalomov winning the silver medal in the freestyle wrestling under 84 kg category. The 2016 Summer Olympics marked the country's first gold medal, won by Dilshod Nazarov in men's hammer throw.
