= 2011 World Wrestling Championships – Women's freestyle 48 kg =

Women's freestyle 48 kg at the 2011 World Championships
- Venue: Sinan Erdem Dome
- Dates: 14 September 2011
- Competitors: 40 from 40 nations

Medalists
gold medal	Hitomi Obara	Japan
silver medal	Mariya Stadnik	Azerbaijan
bronze medal	Zhao Shasha	China
bronze medal	Zhuldyz Eshimova	Kazakhstan

The women's freestyle 48 kilograms is a competition featured at the 2011 World Wrestling Championships, and was held at the Sinan Erdem Dome in Istanbul, Turkey on 14 September 2011.

== Results ==
Legend

- F — Won by fall

=== Finals ===
Semifinals			Final
Hitomi Obara (JPN)	6^{F}
Zhao Shasha (CHN)	2		Hitomi Obara (JPN)	2	1	1
Carolina Castillo (COL)	0	0	Mariya Stadnik (AZE)	3	0	0
Mariya Stadnik (AZE)	6	4

=== Top half ===
==== Section 1 ====
Round of 64

Round of 32
Burcu Kebiç (TUR)	0	1
Henriette Slattum (NOR)	1	1
Hitomi Obara (JPN)	6	7
Lenka Matejová (SVK)	2	0
Tsogtbazaryn Enkhjargal (MGL)	1	1	0
Jaqueline Schellin (GER)	0	1	4^{F}
Carol Huynh (CAN)	1	2
Vanessa Boubryemm (FRA)	0	0

Round of 16
Henriette Slattum (NOR)	0	0
Hitomi Obara (JPN)	3	6
Jaqueline Schellin (GER)	0	0
Carol Huynh (CAN)	1	5

Quarterfinals
Hitomi Obara (JPN)	1	1
Carol Huynh (CAN)	0	0

==== Section 2 ====
Round of 64

Round of 32
Zhao Shasha (CHN)	6	6
Babita Kumari (IND)	2	1
Jessica Blaszka (NED)	5	5
Guadalupe Pérez (MEX)	1	1
Jennifer González (GUA)	0
Tatiana Samkova (RUS)	4^{F}
Íngrid Medrano (ESA)	0	1
Liliana Santos (POR)	1	2

Round of 16
Zhao Shasha (CHN)	6	3	3
Jessica Blaszka (NED)	0	3	0
Tatiana Samkova (RUS)	7	1
Liliana Santos (POR)	1	0

Quarterfinals
Zhao Shasha (CHN)	4	4
Tatiana Samkova (RUS)	3	2

=== Bottom half ===
==== Section 3 ====
Round of 64

Round of 32
Nguyễn Thị Lụa (VIE)	0	1
Carolina Castillo (COL)	3	1
Tanoh Benie (CIV)	0	0
Silvia Felice (ITA)	5	4^{F}
Sarianne Savola (FIN)	0	0
Isabelle Sambou (SEN)	3	2
Cristina Croitoru (ROU)	1	4
Desislava Kancheva (BUL)	0	2

Round of 16
Carolina Castillo (COL)	3	0	1
Silvia Felice (ITA)	0	1	0
Isabelle Sambou (SEN)	1	1
Cristina Croitoru (ROU)	0	0

Quarterfinals
Carolina Castillo (COL)	1	0	4
Isabelle Sambou (SEN)	1	2	1

==== Section 4 ====
Round of 64
Maroi Mezien (TUN)	2	6	3^{F}
Maftuna Miralieva (UZB)	2	4	0
Oleksandra Kohut (UKR)	1	2	3
Sara Sánchez (ESP)	1	1	0
So Sim-hyang (PRK)	1	6
Rebecca Muambo (CMR)	0	0
Iwona Matkowska (POL)	1	0
Clarissa Chun (USA)	3	4
Patricia Bermúdez (ARG)	0	0
Mariya Stadnik (AZE)	2	6
Lee Yu-mi (KOR)	0	1	0
Zhuldyz Eshimova (KAZ)	1	0	1
Iulia Leorda (MDA)	2	1	1
Mayelis Caripá (VEN)	3	1	1
Mikhrniso Nurmatova (KGZ)	0	0
Vanesa Kaladzinskaya (BLR)	1	1

Round of 32
Maroi Mezien (TUN)	0	0
Oleksandra Kohut (UKR)	1	1
So Sim-hyang (PRK)	0	3
Clarissa Chun (USA)	1	4
Mariya Stadnik (AZE)	3	2
Zhuldyz Eshimova (KAZ)	0	0
Mayelis Caripá (VEN)	0	3^{F}
Vanesa Kaladzinskaya (BLR)	1	0

Round of 16
Oleksandra Kohut (UKR)	1	0
Clarissa Chun (USA)	5	1
Mariya Stadnik (AZE)	5	7
Mayelis Caripá (VEN)	0	0

Quarterfinals
Clarissa Chun (USA)	1	0
Mariya Stadnik (AZE)	3	3

=== Repechage ===
Repechage round 1
Patricia Bermúdez (ARG)	0	0
Zhuldyz Eshimova (KAZ)	1	5

Repechage round 2
Lenka Matejová (SVK)	2	1	0
Henriette Slattum (NOR)	1	2	1
Zhuldyz Eshimova (KAZ)	1	1
Mayelis Caripá (VEN)	0	0

Repechage round 3
Henriette Slattum (NOR)	0	0
Carol Huynh (CAN)	1	1
Zhuldyz Eshimova (KAZ)	1	0	2
Clarissa Chun (USA)	0	1	0

Bronze medals
Carol Huynh (CAN)	1	0	0
Zhao Shasha (CHN)	1	2	1
Zhuldyz Eshimova (KAZ)	1	3
Carolina Castillo (COL)	0	0
