= 2010 World Wrestling Championships – Women's freestyle 51 kg =

Women's freestyle 51 kg at the 2010 World Championships
- Venue: Olympic Stadium
- Dates: 8 September 2010
- Competitors: 20 from 20 nations

Medalists
gold medal	Oleksandra Kohut	Ukraine
silver medal	Yu Horiuchi	Japan
bronze medal	Sofia Mattsson	Sweden
bronze medal	Zamira Rakhmanova	Russia

The women's freestyle 51 kilograms is a competition featured at the 2010 World Wrestling Championships, and was held at the Olympic Stadium in Moscow, Russia on 8 September.

This freestyle wrestling competition consists of a single-elimination tournament, with a repechage used to determine the winner of two bronze medals.

== Results ==
Legend

- F — Won by fall

=== Final ===
Final
Yu Horiuchi (JPN)	0	0
Oleksandra Kohut (UKR)	1	2

=== Top half ===
Round of 32

Round of 16
Babita Kumari (IND)	0	0
Roksana Zasina (POL)	1	1
María del Mar Serrano (ESP)	0	0
Jessica Medina (USA)	3	2
Vanessa Boubryemm (FRA)	0	0
Anzhela Dorogan (AZE)	8	4
Sofia Mattsson (SWE)	1	0	0
Yu Horiuchi (JPN)	0	1	2

Quarterfinals
Roksana Zasina (POL)	1	3
Jessica Medina (USA)	0	2
Anzhela Dorogan (AZE)	0	0
Yu Horiuchi (JPN)	5	2

Semifinals
Roksana Zasina (POL)	0	0
Yu Horiuchi (JPN)	1	3

=== Bottom half ===
Round of 32
Isabelle Sambou (SEN)	4^{F}
Li Hui (CHN)	0
Tatyana Bakatyuk (KAZ)	3	1
Jessica MacDonald (CAN)	0	0
Natalia Budu (MDA)	0	0
Tiina Ylinen (FIN)	1	2
Estera Dobre (ROU)	2	5^{F}
Davaasükhiin Otgontsetseg (MGL)	0	0

Round of 16
Nadine Tokar (SUI)	0	0
Zamira Rakhmanova (RUS)	4	5
Oleksandra Kohut (UKR)	0	1	3
Mariya Ivanova (BLR)	1	0	0
Isabelle Sambou (SEN)	0	1
Tatyana Bakatyuk (KAZ)	2	1
Tiina Ylinen (FIN)	0	0
Estera Dobre (ROU)	1	4^{F}

Quarterfinals
Zamira Rakhmanova (RUS)	0	0
Oleksandra Kohut (UKR)	2	1
Tatyana Bakatyuk (KAZ)	1	4	4
Estera Dobre (ROU)	3	0	0

Semifinals
Oleksandra Kohut (UKR)	4	1
Tatyana Bakatyuk (KAZ)	3	0

=== Repechage ===
Repechage round 2
Sofia Mattsson (SWE)	3^{F}
Anzhela Dorogan (AZE)	0
Mariya Ivanova (BLR)	0	0
Zamira Rakhmanova (RUS)	1	4

Bronze medals
Sofia Mattsson (SWE)	6	5^{F}
Roksana Zasina (POL)	0	0
Zamira Rakhmanova (RUS)	3	1
Tatyana Bakatyuk (KAZ)	2	0
