= 2006 World Wrestling Championships – Women's freestyle 48 kg =

Women's freestyle 48 kg at the 2006 World Championships
- Venue: Tianhe Gymnasium
- Dates: 29 September 2006
- Competitors: 27 from 27 nations

Medalists
| gold medal | Chiharu Icho | Japan |
| silver medal | Ren Xuecheng | China |
| bronze medal | Iwona Sadowska | Poland |
| bronze medal | Francine De Paola | Italy |

The women's freestyle 48 kilograms is a competition featured at the 2006 World Wrestling Championships, and was held at the Tianhe Gymnasium in Guangzhou, China on 29 September 2006.

This freestyle wrestling competition consists of a single-elimination tournament, with a repechage used to determine the winner of two bronze medals.

== Results ==
Legend

- F — Won by fall

=== Final ===
| Final |
| Ren Xuecheng (CHN) | 0 |
| Chiharu Icho (JPN) | 3^{F} |

=== Top half ===
Round of 32
Sammy Oziti (NGR) | 1 | 0
Ren Xuecheng (CHN) | 4 | 5^{F}
Alexandra Engelhardt (GER) | 1 | 1 | 3
Lilia Kaskarakova (RUS) | 0 | 3 | 0
Tsogtbazaryn Enkhjargal (MGL) | 0 | 2
Maryna Markevich (BLR) | 4 | 4

Round of 16
Iwona Sadowska (POL) | 1 | 1 | 1
Wu Li-chuan (TPE) | 0 | 1 | 1
Jennifer González (GUA) | 4 | 0
Sunisa Klahan (THA) | 0 | 4^{F}
Hajar Ashtiani (FIN) | 3
Ren Xuecheng (CHN) | 7^{F}
Alexandra Engelhardt (GER) | 2 | 2
Maryna Markevich (BLR) | 3 | 5

Quarterfinals
Iwona Sadowska (POL) | 3^{F}
Sunisa Klahan (THA) | 0
Ren Xuecheng (CHN) | 3^{F}
Maryna Markevich (BLR) | 0

Semifinals
Iwona Sadowska (POL) | 0
Ren Xuecheng (CHN) | 4^{F}

=== Bottom half ===
Round of 32
Shumel Khan (IND) | 0 | 4^{F}
Olena Bondarenko (NZL) | 1 | 0
Nataliya Pulkovska (UKR) | 0 | 6 | 2
Guadalupe Pérez (MEX) | 2 | 0 | 0
Lê Thị Trang (VIE) | 0
Mary Kelly (USA) | 3^{F}
Francine De Paola (ITA) | 6 | 1 | 1
Anne-Catherine Deluntsch (FRA) | 0 | 1 | 0
Fani Psatha (GRE) | 3 | 0 | 0
Kang Son-a (PRK) | 0 | 1 | 2
Cristina Croitoru (ROM) | 0 | 0
Carol Huynh (CAN) | 4 | 6
Chiharu Icho (JPN) | 1 | 6
Mayelis Caripá (VEN) | 0 | 0
Kim Hyung-joo (KOR) | 0 | 1
Tatyana Bakatyuk (KAZ) | 3 | 1

Round of 16
Shumel Khan (IND) | 1 | 0 | 0
Nataliya Pulkovska (UKR) | 0 | 2 | 4^{F}
Mary Kelly (USA) | 2 | 1 | 1
Francine De Paola (ITA) | 0 | 1 | 2
Kang Son-a (PRK) | 0
Carol Huynh (CAN) | 4^{F}
Chiharu Icho (JPN) | 6 | 7
Tatyana Bakatyuk (KAZ) | 0 | 0

Quarterfinals
Nataliya Pulkovska (UKR) | 0 | 1
Francine De Paola (ITA) | 1 | 3
Carol Huynh (CAN) | 0 | 0
Chiharu Icho (JPN) | 1 | 1

Semifinals
Francine De Paola (ITA) | 3 | 0
Chiharu Icho (JPN) | 0 | 4^{F}

=== Repechage ===
Repechage round 1
Sammy Oziti (NGR) | 3 | 1
Hajar Ashtiani (FIN) | 1 | 4^{F}
Mayelis Caripá (VEN) | 6 | 1
Tatyana Bakatyuk (KAZ) | 1 | 1

Repechage round 2
Hajar Ashtiani (FIN) | 0 | 7 | 0
Maryna Markevich (BLR) | 2 | 1 | 2
Mayelis Caripá (VEN) | 1 | 1
Carol Huynh (CAN) | 2 | 4

Bronze medals
Maryna Markevich (BLR) | 0 | 0
Iwona Sadowska (POL) | 1 | 1
Carol Huynh (CAN) | 3 | 1 | 0
Francine De Paola (ITA) | 0 | 1 | 1
