= 2007 World Wrestling Championships – Women's freestyle 51 kg =

Competition featured at 2007 World Wrestling Championships

Women's freestyle 51 kg at the 2007 World Championships
- Venue: Heydar Aliyev Sports and Concert Complex
- Dates: 22 September 2007
- Competitors: 18 from 18 nations

Medalists
gold medal	Hitomi Sakamoto	Japan
silver medal	Ren Xuecheng	China
bronze medal	Anne-Catherine Deluntsch	France
bronze medal	Erica Sharp	Canada

The women's freestyle 51 kilograms is a competition featured at the 2007 World Wrestling Championships, and was held at the Heydar Aliyev Sports and Concert Complex in Baku, Azerbaijan on 22 September 2007.

This freestyle wrestling competition consists of a single-elimination tournament, with a repechage used to determine the winner of two bronze medals.

== Results ==
Legend

- F — Won by fall

=== Final ===
Final
Ren Xuecheng (CHN)	0	0
Hitomi Sakamoto (JPN)	3	2

=== Top half ===
Round of 32

Round of 16
Emese Barka (HUN)	4	1	0
Anne-Catherine Deluntsch (FRA)	2	3	5
Um Hye-jin (KOR)	0	1
Ren Xuecheng (CHN)	5	3^{F}
Jamsrangiin Nyamkhishig (MGL)	0	0
Alexandra Engelhardt (GER)	1	3
Jenny Wong (USA)	0	2
Oleksandra Kohut (UKR)	1	3

Quarterfinals
Anne-Catherine Deluntsch (FRA)	0	3	0
Ren Xuecheng (CHN)	4	3	3
Alexandra Engelhardt (GER)	1	2	4
Oleksandra Kohut (UKR)	0	3	1

Semifinals
Ren Xuecheng (CHN)	8^{F}
Alexandra Engelhardt (GER)	0

=== Bottom half ===
Round of 32
Erica Sharp (CAN)	6^{F}
Dilek Atakol (TUR)	0
Mariya Yahorava (BLR)	1	0
Zamira Rakhmanova (RUS)	3	5

Round of 16
Babita Kumari (IND)	0	2	3
Mihaela Radoi (ROU)	7	0	0
Evdoxia Pavlidou (GRE)	0	0
Tatyana Bakatyuk (KAZ)	1	2
Hitomi Sakamoto (JPN)	4^{F}
María del Mar Serrano (ESP)	0
Erica Sharp (CAN)	0	3	1
Zamira Rakhmanova (RUS)	2	2	1

Quarterfinals
Babita Kumari (IND)	2	0
Tatyana Bakatyuk (KAZ)	3	2
Hitomi Sakamoto (JPN)	6	6
Erica Sharp (CAN)	2	0

Semifinals
Tatyana Bakatyuk (KAZ)	0	0
Hitomi Sakamoto (JPN)	7	4^{F}

=== Repechage ===
Repechage round 2
Um Hye-jin (KOR)	0	0
Anne-Catherine Deluntsch (FRA)	6	5^{F}
María del Mar Serrano (ESP)	0	1	1
Erica Sharp (CAN)	2	1	2

Bronze medals
Anne-Catherine Deluntsch (FRA)	1	4	4
Alexandra Engelhardt (GER)	5	0	2
Erica Sharp (CAN)	1	3
Tatyana Bakatyuk (KAZ)	0	2
