= 2009 World Wrestling Championships – Women's freestyle 48 kg =

Women's freestyle 48 kg at the 2009 World Championships
- Venue: Messecenter Herning
- Dates: 23 September 2009
- Competitors: 25 from 25 nations

Medalists
| gold medal | Mariya Stadnik | Azerbaijan |
| silver medal | Lorisa Oorzhak | Russia |
| bronze medal | So Sim-hyang | North Korea |
| bronze medal | Lyudmyla Balushka | Ukraine |

The women's freestyle 48 kilograms is a competition featured at the 2009 World Wrestling Championships, and was held at the Messecenter Herning exhibition center in Herning, Denmark on September 23.

This freestyle wrestling competition consists of a single-elimination tournament, with a repechage used to determine the winner of two bronze medals.

== Results ==
Legend

- F — Won by fall

=== Final ===
| Final |
| Lorisa Oorzhak (RUS) | 0 | 0 |
| Mariya Stadnik (AZE) | 3 | 2 |

=== Top half ===
Round of 32
Nguyễn Thị Lụa (VIE) | 0 | 1 | 0
Lorisa Oorzhak (RUS) | 1 | 1 | 1

Round of 16
Melvynna Tambunan (SIN) | 0 | 0
Clarissa Chun (USA) | 6 | 6
So Sim-hyang (PRK) | 8 | 7
Lee Yu-mi (KOR) | 0 | 0
Erdenesükhiin Narangerel (MGL) | 0 | 1
Zhuldyz Eshimova (KAZ) | 1 | 1
Sarianne Savola (FIN) | 0 | 0
Lorisa Oorzhak (RUS) | 3 | 3

Quarterfinals
Clarissa Chun (USA) | 0 | 2 | 0
So Sim-hyang (PRK) | 4 | 2 | 1
Zhuldyz Eshimova (KAZ) | 0 | 4
Lorisa Oorzhak (RUS) | 1 | 4

Semifinals
So Sim-hyang (PRK) | 2 | 0 | 0
Lorisa Oorzhak (RUS) | 0 | 3 | 1

=== Bottom half ===
Round of 32
Lindsay Rushton (CAN) | 3 | 0 | 4^{F}
Tang Yan (CHN) | 1 | 1 | 1
Makiko Sakamoto (JPN) | 4^{F}
Onmariel Valenzuela (VEN) | 0
Nirmala Devi (IND) | 0
Yana Stadnik (GBR) | 3^{F}
Anna Łukasiak (POL) | 0 | 0
Naziha Hamza (TUN) | 1 | 1
Sara Sánchez (ESP) | 1 | 0 | 5
Guadalupe Pérez (MEX) | 0 | 1 | 1
Tatsiana Hurnovich (BLR) | 0
Mariya Stadnik (AZE) | 6^{F}
Jaqueline Schellin (GER) | 1 | 2
Sümeyye Sezer (TUR) | 0 | 0
Estera Dobre (ROU) | 0 | 3
Lyudmyla Balushka (UKR) | 4 | 3

Round of 16
Lindsay Rushton (CAN) | 0 | 6 | 3
Makiko Sakamoto (JPN) | 2 | 4 | 2
Yana Stadnik (GBR) | 5^{F}
Naziha Hamza (TUN) | 0
Sara Sánchez (ESP) | 0
Mariya Stadnik (AZE) | 4^{F}
Jaqueline Schellin (GER) | 0
Lyudmyla Balushka (UKR) | 3^{F}

Quarterfinals
Lindsay Rushton (CAN) | 1 | 2
Yana Stadnik (GBR) | 8 | 5
Mariya Stadnik (AZE) | 4 | 4
Lyudmyla Balushka (UKR) | 3 | 2

Semifinals
Yana Stadnik (GBR) | 0 | 0
Mariya Stadnik (AZE) | 2 | 6

=== Repechage ===
Repechage round 1
Nguyễn Thị Lụa (VIE) | 6 | 1
Sarianne Savola (FIN) | 0 | 0
Tatsiana Hurnovich (BLR) | 0 | 1 | 1
Sara Sánchez (ESP) | 4 | 0 | 0

Repechage round 2
Nguyễn Thị Lụa (VIE) | 1 | 1
Zhuldyz Eshimova (KAZ) | 0 | 0
Tatsiana Hurnovich (BLR) | 0
Lyudmyla Balushka (UKR) | 6^{F}

Bronze medals
Nguyễn Thị Lụa (VIE) | 0 | 2
So Sim-hyang (PRK) | 3 | 3
Lyudmyla Balushka (UKR) | 2 | 3^{F}
Yana Stadnik (GBR) | 0 | 4
