= 2000 World Wrestling Championships – Women's freestyle 46 kg =

Women's freestyle 46 kg at the 2000 World Championships
- Venue: Universiada Hall
- Dates: 1–3 September 2000
- Competitors: 15 from 15 nations

Medalists
gold medal	Iryna Melnik	Ukraine
silver medal	Inga Karamchakova	Russia
bronze medal	Carol Huynh	Canada

The women's freestyle 46 kilograms is a competition featured at the 2000 World Wrestling Championships, and was held at the Universiada Hall in Sofia, Bulgaria from 1 to 3 September 2000.

== Results ==
=== Preliminary round ===
==== Pool 1 ====
Pos	Athlete	Pld	W	L	CP	TP	UKR	JPN	CZE
1	Iryna Melnik (UKR)	2	2	0	7	6	—	3–2	3–0 Fall
2	Misato Shimizu (JPN)	2	1	1	5	5	1–3 PP	—	3–0 Fall
3	Veronika Balcarová (CZE)	2	0	2	0	0	0–4 TO	0–4 TO	—

Source: Japan Wrestling

==== Pool 2 ====
Pos	Athlete	Pld	W	L	CP	TP	BUL	GRE	TUR
1	Kamelia Tzekova (BUL)	2	2	0	7	16	—	4–0	12–2
2	Agoro Papavasileiou (GRE)	2	1	1	4	10	0–3 PO	—	10–0
3	Ayşe Güneri (TUR)	2	0	2	1	2	1–4 SP	0–4 ST	—

Source: Japan Wrestling

==== Pool 3 ====
Pos	Athlete	Pld	W	L	CP	TP	FRA	GER	ESA
1	Farah Touchi (FRA)	2	2	0	6	11	—	4–3	7–4
2	Sarah Ehinger (GER)	2	1	1	4	15	1–3 PP	—	12–5
3	Íngrid Medrano (ESA)	2	0	2	2	9	1–3 PP	1–3 PP	—

Source: Japan Wrestling

==== Pool 4 ====
Pos	Athlete	Pld	W	L	CP	TP	RUS	MEX	USA
1	Inga Karamchakova (RUS)	2	2	0	8	19	—	12–2	7–4 Fall
2	María Barraza (MEX)	2	1	1	5	9	1–4 SP	—	8–3 Fall
3	Clarissa Chun (USA)	2	0	2	0	7	0–4 TO	0–4 TO	—

Source: Japan Wrestling

==== Pool 5 ====
Pos	Athlete	Pld	W	L	CP	TP	CAN	TPE	VEN
1	Carol Huynh (CAN)	2	2	0	8	15	—	11–1	4–1 Fall
2	Kao Wei-chien (TPE)	2	1	1	5	8	1–4 SP	—	7–0 Fall
3	Mayelis Caripá (VEN)	2	0	2	0	1	0–4 TO	0–4 TO	—

Source: Japan Wrestling

=== Knockout round ===
Quarterfinals
Iryna Melnik (UKR)	8
Kamelia Tzekova (BUL)	4

Semifinals
Iryna Melnik (UKR)	5
Farah Touchi (FRA)	1
Inga Karamchakova (RUS)	8
Carol Huynh (CAN)	3

Final
Iryna Melnik (UKR)	5
Inga Karamchakova (RUS)	2
Bronze medal match
Farah Touchi (FRA)	3
Carol Huynh (CAN)	4
