= 2009 World Wrestling Championships – Women's freestyle 51 kg =

Women's freestyle 51 kg at the 2009 World Championships
- Venue: Messecenter Herning
- Dates: 23 September 2009
- Competitors: 27 from 27 nations

Medalists
gold medal	Sofia Mattsson	Sweden
silver medal	Han Kum-ok	North Korea
bronze medal	Oleksandra Kohut	Ukraine
bronze medal	Yuri Kai	Japan

The women's freestyle 51 kilograms is a competition featured at the 2009 World Wrestling Championships, and was held at the Messecenter Herning exhibition center in Herning, Denmark on September 23.

This freestyle wrestling competition consists of a single-elimination tournament, with a repechage used to determine the winner of two bronze medals.

== Results ==
Legend

- F — Won by fall

=== Final ===
Final
Han Kum-ok (PRK)	0	0
Sofia Mattsson (SWE)	3	4

=== Top half ===
Round of 32
Manuela Andriantsalama (MAD)	0	0
Babita Kumari (IND)	4	6
Davaasükhiin Otgontsetseg (MGL)	5	4
Nadine Tokar (SUI)	1	2
Natalia Budu (MDA)	1	1
Cristina Croitoru (ROU)	0	0

Round of 16
Roksana Zasina (POL)	3	3
Jessica MacDonald (CAN)	0	0
Han Kum-ok (PRK)	1	0	5
Oleksandra Kohut (UKR)	0	2	0
Marina Vilmova (RUS)	2	1	1
Babita Kumari (IND)	1	2	3
Davaasükhiin Otgontsetseg (MGL)	1	0
Natalia Budu (MDA)	4	4^{F}

Quarterfinals
Roksana Zasina (POL)	0	2
Han Kum-ok (PRK)	3	3
Babita Kumari (IND)	1	2
Natalia Budu (MDA)	4	3

Semifinals
Han Kum-ok (PRK)	4	5	5
Natalia Budu (MDA)	7	3	4

=== Bottom half ===
Round of 32
Jessica Medina (USA)	3	3
Trần Thị Diệu Ninh (VIE)	0	3
Hong Di (CHN)	0
Sofia Mattsson (SWE)	5^{F}
Alexandra Engelhardt (GER)	8^{F}
Kyla Bremner (AUS)	0
María del Mar Serrano (ESP)	0	0
Kim Hyung-joo (KOR)	6	3
Yuri Kai (JPN)	1	1
Mariya Ivanova (BLR)	0	0
Burcu Kebiç (TUR)	0	0
Emese Szabó (HUN)	1	4^{F}
Romina González (ARG)	0	0
Tatyana Bakatyuk (KAZ)	1	4^{F}
Isabelle Sambou (SEN)	1	3
Hadia Trabelsi (TUN)	0	1

Round of 16
Jessica Medina (USA)	0	0
Sofia Mattsson (SWE)	6	1
Alexandra Engelhardt (GER)	2^{F}
Kim Hyung-joo (KOR)	1
Yuri Kai (JPN)	0	1	1
Emese Szabó (HUN)	1	0	0
Tatyana Bakatyuk (KAZ)	0	4	0
Isabelle Sambou (SEN)	1	1	2

Quarterfinals
Sofia Mattsson (SWE)	4	6
Alexandra Engelhardt (GER)	0	0
Yuri Kai (JPN)	1	5^{F}
Isabelle Sambou (SEN)	0	0

Semifinals
Sofia Mattsson (SWE)	3	2
Yuri Kai (JPN)	0	0

=== Repechage ===
Repechage round 1
Hong Di (CHN)	1	1
Jessica Medina (USA)	0	0

Repechage round 2
Oleksandra Kohut (UKR)	2	0	1
Roksana Zasina (POL)	1	1	0
Hong Di (CHN)	1	1
Alexandra Engelhardt (GER)	0	0

Bronze medals
Oleksandra Kohut (UKR)	1	1
Natalia Budu (MDA)	0	0
Hong Di (CHN)	0
Yuri Kai (JPN)	3^{F}
