= Mariya Stadnik =

Ukrainian-Azerbaijani freestyle wrestler

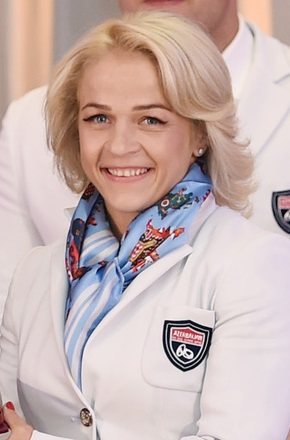
- Stadnik in 2016

Personal information
- Native name: Марія Василівна Стадник
- Full name: Mariya Vasylivna Stadnyk
- Born: 3 December 1988 (age 37) Lviv, Ukrainian SSR, Soviet Union
- Height: 1.57 m (5 ft 2 in)
- Weight: 50 kg (110 lb)

Sport
- Country: Ukraine (2003–2007); Azerbaijan (2007–2025)
- Sport: Amateur wrestling
Medal record
Event	1st	2nd	3rd
Olympic Games	-	2	2
World Championships	2	3	1
European Championships	11	-	-
European Games	2	-	-
Islamic Solidarity Games	2	-	-
Other	21	2	1
Total	38	7	4
Women's freestyle wrestling
Representing Azerbaijan
Olympic Games
Silver medal – second place	2012 London	48 kg
Silver medal – second place	2016 Rio de Janeiro	48 kg
Bronze medal – third place	2008 Beijing	48 kg
Bronze medal – third place	2020 Tokyo	50 kg
World Championships
Gold medal – first place	2009 Herning	48 kg
Gold medal – first place	2019 Nur-Sultan	50 kg
Silver medal – second place	2011 Istanbul	48 kg
Silver medal – second place	2015 Las Vegas	48 kg
Silver medal – second place	2018 Budapest	50 kg
Bronze medal – third place	2014 Tashkent	48 kg
European Championships
Gold medal – first place	2008 Tampere	48 kg
Gold medal – first place	2009 Vilnius	48 kg
Gold medal – first place	2011 Dortmund	48 kg
Gold medal – first place	2014 Vantaa	48 kg
Gold medal – first place	2016 Riga	48 kg
Gold medal – first place	2017 Novi Sad	48 kg
Gold medal – first place	2018 Kaspiysk	50 kg
Gold medal – first place	2021 Warsaw	50 kg
Gold medal – first place	2023 Zagreb	50 kg
Gold medal – first place	2024 Bucharest	50 kg
European Games
Gold medal – first place	2015 Baku	48 kg
Gold medal – first place	2019 Minsk	50 kg
Islamic Solidarity Games
Gold medal – first place	2017 Baku	48 kg
Gold medal – first place	2021 Konya	50 kg
Golden Grand Prix
Gold medal – first place	2008 Baku	48 kg
Gold medal – first place	2011 Baku	48 kg
Gold medal – first place	2014 Baku	48 kg
Gold medal – first place	2014 Paris	48 kg
Bronze medal – third place	2009 Baku	48 kg
Grand Prix
Gold medal – first place	2011 Goetzis	48 kg
Gold medal – first place	2012 London	48 kg
Gold medal – first place	2012 Kyiv	48 kg
Gold medal – first place	2012 Dormagen	48 kg
Gold medal – first place	2014 Klippan	48 kg
Gold medal – first place	2014 Dormagen	48 kg
Gold medal – first place	2015 Klippan	48 kg
Gold medal – first place	2016 Kyiv	48 kg
Silver medal – second place	2018 Klippan	48 kg
Yasar Dogu Tournament
Gold medal – first place	2011 Istanbul	48 kg
Dan Kolov & Nikola Petrov Tournament
Gold medal – first place	2018 Sofia	50 kg
Gold medal – first place	2023 Sofia	50 kg
Poland Open
Gold medal – first place	2015 Warsaw	48 kg
Gold medal – first place	2016 Spala	48 kg
Gold medal – first place	2018 Warsaw	50 kg
Gold medal – first place	2021 Warsaw	50 kg
Representing Ukraine
World Juniors Championships
Gold medal – first place	2005 Vilnius	44 kg
European Cadets Championships
Gold medal – first place	2003 Sevilla	38 kg
Silver medal – second place	2004 Albena	43 kg

Mariya Stadnik (Ukrainian: Марія Василівна Стадник; Mariya Vasylivna Stadnyk; born 3 December 1988) is a retired Ukrainian-born Azerbaijani female wrestler who won four Olympic medals, two World Championship and ten European Championship, senior coach of Azerbaijan's U-15 and U-17 national wrestling teams.

== Personal life ==
Stadnik was born on 3 December 1988 in Lviv, Ukrainian SSR, Soviet Union. She started wrestling in 2000, graduated from Lviv State University of Physical Culture. She is married to Ukrainian wrestler Andriy Stadnik. The couple have a son, Igor, born in 2010, and a daughter, Mia, born in 2013. Her sister-in-law, Yana Rattigan, competes for Ukraine in the same weight category as Mariya, and has wrestled with Stadnik three times in international competitions, all won by Stadnik.

== Career ==
Mariya Stadnik competed at the European Junior Championship, which took place in August 2003 in Seville, Spain. In the final match of the tournament, Stadnik won against Romania's Alina Pogachan and became the winner of the European Junior Championship. This gold medal was the first that 14-year-old Stadnik won at international tournaments. A year later, in July 2004, Stadnik once again competed at the European Junior Championships. In the final match of the tournament, which took place in Albena, Bulgaria, Stadnik lost to Swedish wrestler Sofia Mattsson and won the silver medal of the tournament. Stadnik next competed in the Junior World Championship, which took place in July 2005 in Vilnius, Lithuania. She faced India's Sudes Kumar in the 1/8 finals of the tournament. In that match, Stadnik won ahead of Schedule (2:44 minutes) over her rival and reached the 1/4 final stage. Her opponent at this stage was the representative of Germany Anniha Hofmann. In this match, Stadnik won ahead of time (1:44 minutes) over her rival and reached the semi-final stage of the tournament. At this stage, her opponent was the representative of Turkey Demet Kaya. Also in the third match, Stadnik won ahead of schedule over her rival and qualified for the final match of the championship. And in the decisive match, her opponent was the representative of Vietnam Ti Han Nguyen. In the final match, Stadnik also won ahead of schedule. Having defeated her opponent in 2:50 minutes with a score of 8:0, 16-year-old Mariya Stadnik became the winner of the World Junior Championship.

Mariya Stadnik, who won the European Junior Championship and the World Junior Championship in three years, competed in 2006 at the European Championship, which took place in Russia on 25–30 April. There she faced Greek representative Fani Psata in the 1/8 finals of the tournament. In that match, Mariya Stadnik won over the opponent (2:0) and reached the 1/4 finals. Her opponent at this stage was the representative of Finland Hagar Ashtiani. Mariya Stadnik defeated her rival (2:0) and reached the semi-final stage of the tournament. On the way to the final, her rival was the representative of Romania Christina Kroitor. Stadnik won over her rival in the third match (2:0) and qualified for the final match of the championship. In the decisive match, her opponent was the representative of Russia Lilia Kasharova. In the third part of the match, which took place in a tense Sports struggle, Stadnik won a victory over her rival and won the Gold Medal of the European Championship. However, in June 2006, International Wrestling Federation (FILA) reported that Furosemide, a prohibited drug, was found in the blood test taken from Mariya Stadnik, and she was deprived of her gold medal at the European Championship. She was also forbidden from competing in international tournaments.

In April 2007, Mariya Stadnik's penalty for not competing in international tournaments for a year ended. The main tournament of the year was the World Championship, which will take place in September. That tournament licensed the 2008 Olympics. But there was intense competition to become the "number one" of the national team. The winner of the 2004 Olympics, Iryna Merleni, completed her maternity leave and regained her athletic form. Its main goal was the 2008 Olympics. The coaches of the team said that 18-year-old Mariya Stadnik was young and inexperienced, and Iryna Merleni would go to the World Championship in September. Young Stadnik, whose main goal was to compete at the 2008 Olympics, left the Ukrainian national team. In 2007, the World Championship would take place in Azerbaijan. On the eve, the Azerbaijan Wrestling Federation (AWF) began recruiting wrestlers from other national teams to form the Azerbaijani women's national team. Maria Kachina from Russia, Olesya Zamula from Latvia, and Yulia Ratkevich from Belarus were recruited to the Azerbaijani national team. The Azerbaijan Wrestling Federation (AWF) also invited Mariya Stadnik to compete in the Azerbaijani national team. She accepted the invitation and thus began to compete in international tournaments for the Azerbaijani national team.

The main tournament of 2007 was the World Championship, which took place on 16–24 September. Mariya Stadnik competed in the tournament held at the Heydar Aliyev Sports Arena on 21 September.[17] in the 1/32 finals of the tournament, her rival was the representative of Romania Christina Croitoru. In that match, Stadnik won a premature victory over her rival (6:0, 4:0) and reached the 1/16 final stage. Her opponent at this stage was the representative of South Korea Kim Hyun-Jo. In this match, Stadnik won a premature victory over her rival (2:0, 8: 0) and reached the 1/8 finals. Her rival at this stage was the representative of Germany Brigitte Wagner, who won the world and European Championships. In the match, which took place in a tense sports struggle, Stadnik won 2:0 (1:0, 4:2) and advanced to the 1/4 finals of the championship. At this stage, her rival was Chiharu Icho, a representative of Japan, who was a finalist of the 2004 Athens Olympics, this meeting took place in an atmosphere of intense sports struggle. As a result, Stadnik 1:2 (1:0, 1:1, 1:1) she lost with her score and continued the fight in the repechage group. Stadnik faced US representative Stephanie Murata in the first meeting of this group. Stadnik lost to her rival in that match (1:2, 1:1). Mariya Stadnik finished 7th, but later the CAS decided that all results obtained by her between 26 April 2006 and 25 April 2008 must be disqualified.

Competing in the freestyle – 48 kg weight class, she won gold at the 2008 European Championships in Tampere and bronze at the 2008 Summer Olympics in Beijing.

Stadnik went on to win gold at the 2009 European Championships in Vilnius, the 2009 World Championships in Herning, the 2019 World Championships in Nur-Sultan, and the 2011 European Championships in Dortmund. At the 2012 Summer Olympics in London, she was awarded the silver medal.

She won silver at the 2016 Summer Olympics in Rio de Janeiro, Brazil.

In 2018, she won the silver medal in the women's 50 kg event at the Klippan Lady Open in Klippan, Sweden. In 2021, she won the gold medal in her event at the 2021 Poland Open held in Warsaw, Poland.

In 2022, she won the gold medal in the 50 kg event at the 2021 Islamic Solidarity Games held in Konya, Turkey. She won the gold medal in the women's 50 kg event at the 2023 Dan Kolov & Nikola Petrov Tournament held in Sofia, Bulgaria.

She won the gold medal in the women's 50 kg event at the 2024 European Wrestling Championships held in Bucharest, Romania. In the final, she defeated Evin Demirhan Yavuz of Turkey. She competed at the 2024 European Wrestling Olympic Qualification Tournament in Baku, Azerbaijan hoping to qualify for the 2024 Summer Olympics in Paris, France. She was eliminated in her second match. A month later, Stadnik competed at the 2024 World Wrestling Olympic Qualification Tournament held in Istanbul, Turkey and she earned a quota place for Azerbaijan for the Olympics. She competed in the women's 50 kg event at the Olympics. She was eliminated in her second match by Dolgorjavyn Otgonjargal of Mongolia.

On February 2, 2025, Stadnik retired from her career, and the next day, it was announced that she would serve as the coordinator for women's wrestling at the Azerbaijan Wrestling Federation.

On February 23, 2026, Stadnik has been appointed senior coach of Azerbaijan's U-15 and U-17 national wrestling teams.

== At the Summer Olympics ==
Olympic Games	Event	Qualification	Round of 16	Quarterfinal	Semifinal	Repechage 1	Repechage 2	Final / BM	
Olympic Games	Event	Opposition Result	Opposition Result	Opposition Result	Opposition Result	Opposition Result	Opposition Result	Opposition Result	Rank
2008 Beijing	−48 kg	BYE	Huynh (CAN); L 3–4, 0–2	BYE			Kim (KOR); W 1–0, 3–2	3rd place match Bakatyuk (KAZ); W 2–1, 8–0	Bronze medal
2012 London	−48 kg	BYE	Chun (USA); W 3–0 ^{PO}	Matkowska (POL); W 3–1 ^{PP}	Merleni (UKR); W 3–0 ^{PO}	BYE		Obara (JPN); L 3–1 ^{PP}	2nd place, silver medalist(s)
2016 Rio de Janeiro	−48 kg	BYE	Bermúdez (ARG); W 4–0 ^{ST}	Matkowska (POL); W 4–0 ^{ST}	Yankova (BUL); W 5–0 ^{VT}	BYE		Tosaka (JPN); L 2–3 ^{VT}	2nd place, silver medalist(s)
2020 Tokyo	−50 kg	BYE	Orshush (ROC); W 11–7 ^{PP}	Hamdi (TUN); W 4–0 ^{ST}	Susaki (JPN); L 0–4 ^{ST}	BYE		3rd place match Tsogt-Ochiryn (MGL); W 4–0 ^{ST}	3rd place, bronze medalist(s)
