= Wrestling at the 2008 Summer Olympics – Women's freestyle 48 kg =

Women's freestyle 48 kg at the Games of the XXIX Olympiad
- Venue: China Agricultural University Gymnasium
- Date: 16 August 2008
- Competitors: 17 from 17 nations

Medalists
1st place, gold medalist(s)		Carol Huynh	Canada
2nd place, silver medalist(s)		Chiharu Icho	Japan
3rd place, bronze medalist(s)		Mariya Stadnik	Azerbaijan
3rd place, bronze medalist(s)		Iryna Merleni	Ukraine

Women's freestyle 48 kilograms competition at the 2008 Summer Olympics in Beijing, China, was held on August 16 at the China Agricultural University Gymnasium.

This freestyle wrestling competition consisted of a single-elimination tournament, with a repechage used to determine the winner of two bronze medals. The two finalists faced off for gold and silver medals. Each wrestler who lost to one of the two finalists moved into the repechage, culminating in a pair of bronze medal matches featuring the semifinal losers each facing the remaining repechage opponent from their half of the bracket.

Each bout consisted of up to three rounds, lasting two minutes apiece. The wrestler who scored more points in each round was the winner of that rounds; the bout finished when one wrestler had won two rounds (and thus the match).

== Schedule ==
All times are China Standard Time (UTC+08:00)

Date	Time	Event
16 August 2008	09:30	Qualification rounds
16 August 2008	16:00	Repechage
16 August 2008	16:30	Finals

== Results ==
Legend

- F — Won by fall

=== Final ===
Final
Carol Huynh (CAN)	4	2
Chiharu Icho (JPN)	0	1

=== Top half ===
Qualifications

1/8 finals
Tatyana Bakatyuk (KAZ)	1	1
Alexandra Engelhardt (GER)	0	0
Íngrid Medrano (ESA)	5	7
Estera Dobre (ROU)	1	7
Carol Huynh (CAN)	4	2
Mariya Stadnik (AZE)	3	0
Kim Hyung-joo (KOR)	6	4
Kyla Bremner (AUS)	0	0

Quarterfinals
Tatyana Bakatyuk (KAZ)	5	2
Íngrid Medrano (ESA)	0	0
Carol Huynh (CAN)	1	1
Kim Hyung-joo (KOR)	0	0

Semifinals
Tatyana Bakatyuk (KAZ)	0	0
Carol Huynh (CAN)	1	4

=== Bottom half ===
Qualifications
Vanessa Boubryemm (FRA)	1	1
Mayelis Caripá (VEN)	0	0

1/8 finals
Chiharu Icho (JPN)	0	1	1
Li Xiaomei (CHN)	1	0	0
Iryna Merleni (UKR)	5^{F}
Tsogtbazaryn Enkhjargal (MGL)	0
Sofia Mattsson (SWE)	1	1
Clarissa Chun (USA)	2	4
Zamira Rakhmanova (RUS)	1	2
Vanessa Boubryemm (FRA)	3	3

Quarterfinals
Chiharu Icho (JPN)	0	3^{F}
Iryna Merleni (UKR)	1	1
Clarissa Chun (USA)	6	2
Vanessa Boubryemm (FRA)	1	1

Semifinals
Chiharu Icho (JPN)	1	0	1
Clarissa Chun (USA)	0	3	1

=== Repechage ===
Repechage round 2
Mariya Stadnik (AZE)	1	3
Kim Hyung-joo (KOR)	0	2
Li Xiaomei (CHN)	1	0	0
Iryna Merleni (UKR)	0	4	4^{F}

Bronze medals
Mariya Stadnik (AZE)	2	8
Tatyana Bakatyuk (KAZ)	1	0
Iryna Merleni (UKR)	2	4^{F}
Clarissa Chun (USA)	0	1

== Final standing ==
Rank	Athlete
1st place, gold medalist(s)	Carol Huynh (CAN)
2nd place, silver medalist(s)	Chiharu Icho (JPN)
3rd place, bronze medalist(s)	Mariya Stadnik (AZE)
3rd place, bronze medalist(s)	Iryna Merleni (UKR)
5	Tatyana Bakatyuk (KAZ)
5	Clarissa Chun (USA)
7	Vanessa Boubryemm (FRA)
8	Kim Hyung-joo (KOR)
9	Íngrid Medrano (ESA)
10	Estera Dobre (ROU)
11	Zamira Rakhmanova (RUS)
12	Sofia Mattsson (SWE)
13	Li Xiaomei (CHN)
14	Mayelis Caripá (VEN)
14	Alexandra Engelhardt (GER)
16	Tsogtbazaryn Enkhjargal (MGL)
17	Kyla Bremner (AUS)
