= 2011 World Wrestling Championships – Women's freestyle 59 kg =

Women's freestyle 59 kg at the 2011 World Championships
- Venue: Sinan Erdem Dome
- Dates: 15 September 2011
- Competitors: 21 from 21 nations

Medalists
gold medal	Hanna Vasylenko	Ukraine
silver medal	Sofia Mattsson	Sweden
bronze medal	Takako Saito	Japan
bronze medal	Sona Ahmadli	Azerbaijan

The women's freestyle 59 kilograms is a competition featured at the 2011 World Wrestling Championships, and was held at the Sinan Erdem Dome in Istanbul, Turkey on 15 September 2011.

This freestyle wrestling competition consists of a single-elimination tournament, with a repechage used to determine the winner of two bronze medals.

== Results ==
Legend

- F — Won by fall

=== Final ===
Final
Sofia Mattsson (SWE)	2	1
Hanna Vasylenko (UKR)	2	2

=== Top half ===
Round of 32

Round of 16
Dorjiin Narmandakh (MGL)	0
Sofia Mattsson (SWE)	5^{F}
Leyla Metin (TUR)	1	1
Gabriella Sleisz (HUN)	0	0
Yuliana Alzate (COL)	0	0
Takako Saito (JPN)	4	3^{F}
Adeline Vescan (FRA)	3^{F}
Rosell Utne (NOR)	0

Quarterfinals
Sofia Mattsson (SWE)	4^{F}
Leyla Metin (TUR)	0
Takako Saito (JPN)	4	3
Adeline Vescan (FRA)	1	0

Semifinals
Sofia Mattsson (SWE)	1	2
Takako Saito (JPN)	0	0

=== Bottom half ===
Round of 32
Camila Fama (BRA)	1	0
Amanda Gerhart (CAN)	4	1
Valeria Zholobova (RUS)	5	4
Irina Petrova (LAT)	0	0
Sona Ahmadli (AZE)	1	2
Olga Kalinina (KAZ)	0	0
Dương Thị Lan (VIE)	0	2
Nadzeya Mikhalkova (BLR)	2	6^{F}
Kelsey Campbell (USA)	0	2	1
Agata Pietrzyk (POL)	1	0	6

Round of 16
Yang Chen (CHN)	0	2	3
Dzhanan Manolova (BUL)	3	0	0
Hanna Vasylenko (UKR)	5	3
Amanda Gerhart (CAN)	0	0
Valeria Zholobova (RUS)	2	1	1
Sona Ahmadli (AZE)	0	2	2
Nadzeya Mikhalkova (BLR)	2	0	2
Agata Pietrzyk (POL)	0	1	0

Quarterfinals
Yang Chen (CHN)	0	0
Hanna Vasylenko (UKR)	2	1
Sona Ahmadli (AZE)	3	3
Nadzeya Mikhalkova (BLR)	1	2

Semifinals
Hanna Vasylenko (UKR)	8^{F}
Sona Ahmadli (AZE)	4

=== Repechage ===
Repechage round 2
Dorjiin Narmandakh (MGL)	7	1
Leyla Metin (TUR)	1	0
Amanda Gerhart (CAN)	1	1
Yang Chen (CHN)	0	0

Bronze medals
Dorjiin Narmandakh (MGL)	4	0	0
Takako Saito (JPN)	4	5	3^{F}
Amanda Gerhart (CAN)	0	1
Sona Ahmadli (AZE)	1	2
