= Benie =

Benie is both a given name and a surname. Notable people with the name include:

- Bénie Traoré (born 2002), Ivorian footballer
- Tanoh Benie (born 1993), Ivorian wrestler
