= Wrestling at the 2011 Pan American Games – Women's freestyle 48 kg =

Women's Freestyle 48 kg at the 2011 Pan American Games
- Venue: CODE II Gymnasium
- Dates: October 22
- Competitors: 9 from 9 nations

Medalists
Gold medal	Carol Huynh	Canada
Silver medal	Clarissa Chun	United States
Bronze medal	Patricia Bermudez	Argentina
Bronze medal	Carolina Castillo	Colombia

The women's freestyle 48 kg competition of the wrestling events at the 2011 Pan American Games in Guadalajara, Mexico, was held on October 22 at the CODE II Gymanasium. The defending champion was Carol Huynh from Canada.

This freestyle wrestling competition consisted of a single-elimination tournament, with a repechage used to determine the winner of two bronze medals. The two finalists faced off for gold and silver medals. Each wrestler who lost to one of the two finalists moved into the repechage, culminating in a pair of bronze medal matches featuring the semifinal losers each facing the remaining repechage opponent from their half of the bracket.

Each bout consisted of up to three rounds, lasting two minutes apiece. The wrestler who scored more points in each round was the winner of that rounds; the bout finished when one wrestler had won two rounds (and thus the match).

== Schedule ==
All times are Central Standard Time (UTC-6).

Date	Time	Round
October 22, 2011	10:00	Preliminary bouts
October 22, 2011	10:08	Quarterfinals
October 22, 2011	11:12	Semifinals
October 22, 2011	18:00	Bronze medal matches
October 22, 2011	18:08	Final

== Results ==
=== Main bracket ===
1/8 Finals
Ingrid Medrano (ESA)	0
Patricia Bermudez (ARG)	2

Quarterfinals
Flor Quispe (PER)	0	0
Carolina Castillo (COL)	1	1
Guadalupe Perez (MEX)	0	0
Clarissa Chun (USA)	6	5
Luisa Valverde (ECU)	6	4
Nesmarie Rodriguez (PUR)	0	1
Carol Huynh (CAN)	3	0	3
Patricia Bermudez (ARG)	0	1	0

Semifinals
Carolina Castillo (COL)	1	0	0
Clarissa Chun (USA)	0	2	5
Luisa Valverde (ECU)	0	0
Carol Huynh (CAN)	2	3

Finals
Clarissa Chun (USA)	3	0
Carol Huynh (CAN)	2	4

=== Repechage round ===
Two bronze medals were awarded.

Repechage round 1	Bronze Medal Bout
	Carolina Castillo (COL)	1 0 2
Guadalupe Perez (MEX)	Guadalupe Perez (MEX)	0 1 0
Bye

Repechage round 1	Bronze Medal Bout
	Luisa Valverde (ECU)	0 1 1
Patricia Bermudez (ARG)	Patricia Bermudez (ARG)	0 1 1
Bye
