= 2010 Asian Wrestling Championships =

- Host city: New Delhi, India
- Dates: 12–16 May 2010
- Stadium: Indira Gandhi Arena

Champions
- Freestyle: Iran
- Greco-Roman: South Korea
- Women: China

The 2010 Asian Wrestling Championships were held at the Indira Gandhi Arena, New Delhi, India. The event took place from 12 to 16 May 2010.

== Medal table ==
Rank	Nation	Gold	Silver	Bronze	Total
1	China	5	3	5	13
2	South Korea	5	2	4	11
3	Iran	5	1	3	9
4	Japan	2	4	6	12
5	Kazakhstan	2	4	5	11
6	India	2	1	4	7
7	Mongolia	0	4	2	6
8	Uzbekistan	0	1	4	5
9	Jordan	0	1	0	1
10	North Korea	0	0	4	4
11	Kyrgyzstan	0	0	3	3
12	Tajikistan	0	0	1	1
12	Vietnam	0	0	1	1
Totals (13 entries)		21	21	42	84

== Team ranking ==
Rank	Men's freestyle		Men's Greco-Roman		Women's freestyle	
Rank	Team	Points	Team	Points	Team	Points
1	Iran	53	South Korea	56	China	65
2	Kazakhstan	48	China	49	Japan	60
3	South Korea	46	India	49	Kazakhstan	49
4	Japan	41	Iran	46	Mongolia	42
5	India	37	Kazakhstan	42	India	42
6	Uzbekistan	33	Kyrgyzstan	37	North Korea	25
7	Kyrgyzstan	32	Uzbekistan	33	South Korea	22
8	China	30	Jordan	18	Vietnam	22
9	Mongolia	25	Japan	17	Chinese Taipei	21
10	North Korea	21	Tajikistan	13	Kyrgyzstan	16

== Medal summary ==
=== Men's freestyle ===
Event	Gold	Silver	Bronze
55 kg	Shinichi Yumoto; Japan	Nasibullo Kurbanov; Uzbekistan	Lee Woo-joo; South Korea
55 kg	Shinichi Yumoto; Japan	Nasibullo Kurbanov; Uzbekistan	Yang Kyong-il; North Korea
60 kg	Masoud Esmaeilpour; Iran	Shogo Maeda; Japan	Lee Seung-chul; South Korea
60 kg	Masoud Esmaeilpour; Iran	Shogo Maeda; Japan	Dauren Zhumagaziyev; Kazakhstan
66 kg	Sushil Kumar; India	Kim Dai-sung; South Korea	Ikhtiyor Navruzov; Uzbekistan
66 kg	Sushil Kumar; India	Kim Dai-sung; South Korea	Pürevjavyn Önörbat; Mongolia
74 kg	Narsingh Yadav; India	Saeid Riahi; Iran	Seifaddin Osmanov; Kazakhstan
74 kg	Narsingh Yadav; India	Saeid Riahi; Iran	Lee Yun-seok; South Korea
84 kg	Ehsan Lashgari; Iran	Semyon Semyonov; Kazakhstan	Shinya Matsumoto; Japan
84 kg	Ehsan Lashgari; Iran	Semyon Semyonov; Kazakhstan	Zhang Feng; China
96 kg	Reza Yazdani; Iran	Nurzhan Katayev; Kazakhstan	Takao Isokawa; Japan
96 kg	Reza Yazdani; Iran	Nurzhan Katayev; Kazakhstan	Kim Jae-gang; South Korea
120 kg	Marid Mutalimov; Kazakhstan	Jargalsaikhany Chuluunbat; Mongolia	Mohammad Reza Azarshakib; Iran
120 kg	Marid Mutalimov; Kazakhstan	Jargalsaikhany Chuluunbat; Mongolia	Aiaal Lazarev; Kyrgyzstan

=== Men's Greco-Roman ===
Event	Gold	Silver	Bronze
55 kg	Choi Gyu-jin; South Korea	Rajender Kumar; India	Marat Garipov; Kazakhstan
55 kg	Choi Gyu-jin; South Korea	Rajender Kumar; India	Kanybek Zholchubekov; Kyrgyzstan
60 kg	Sheng Jiang; China	Woo Seung-jae; South Korea	Sanjarbek Jumashev; Uzbekistan
60 kg	Sheng Jiang; China	Woo Seung-jae; South Korea	Ravinder Singh; India
66 kg	Kim Hyeon-woo; South Korea	Aibek Yensekhanov; Kazakhstan	Sunil Kumar Rana; India
66 kg	Kim Hyeon-woo; South Korea	Aibek Yensekhanov; Kazakhstan	Yan Pengfei; China
74 kg	Park Jin-sung; South Korea	Saren Mandula; China	Mehdi Mohammadi; Iran
74 kg	Park Jin-sung; South Korea	Saren Mandula; China	Vsevolod Mihaylovskiy; Uzbekistan
84 kg	Lee Se-yeol; South Korea	Norikatsu Saikawa; Japan	Davoud Abedinzadeh; Iran
84 kg	Lee Se-yeol; South Korea	Norikatsu Saikawa; Japan	Janarbek Kenjeev; Kyrgyzstan
96 kg	Babak Ghorbani; Iran	Zhai Ningchao; China	Margulan Assembekov; Kazakhstan
96 kg	Babak Ghorbani; Iran	Zhai Ningchao; China	Muminjon Abdullaev; Uzbekistan
120 kg	Mohammad Ghorbani; Iran	Hani Al-Marafi; Jordan	Liu Deli; China
120 kg	Mohammad Ghorbani; Iran	Hani Al-Marafi; Jordan	Murodjon Tuychiev; Tajikistan

=== Women's freestyle ===
Event	Gold	Silver	Bronze
48 kg	Zhao Shasha; China	Fuyuko Mimura; Japan	So Sim-hyang; North Korea
48 kg	Zhao Shasha; China	Fuyuko Mimura; Japan	Nguyễn Thị Lụa; Vietnam
51 kg	Li Hui; China	Zhuldyz Eshimova; Kazakhstan	Hiromi Sakurai; Japan
51 kg	Li Hui; China	Zhuldyz Eshimova; Kazakhstan	Han Kum-ok; North Korea
55 kg	Yang Senlian; China	Chikako Matsukawa; Japan	Choe Hung-yong; North Korea
55 kg	Yang Senlian; China	Chikako Matsukawa; Japan	Sündeviin Byambatseren; Mongolia
59 kg	Liu Fengming; China	Soronzonboldyn Battsetseg; Mongolia	Yurika Ito; Japan
59 kg	Liu Fengming; China	Soronzonboldyn Battsetseg; Mongolia	Alka Tomar; India
63 kg	Park Sang-eun; South Korea	Cui Haili; China	Suman Kundu; India
63 kg	Park Sang-eun; South Korea	Cui Haili; China	Seiko Nagashima; Japan
67 kg	Chiaki Iijima; Japan	Banzragchiin Oyuunsüren; Mongolia	Olga Zhanibekova; Kazakhstan
67 kg	Chiaki Iijima; Japan	Banzragchiin Oyuunsüren; Mongolia	Chen Ying; China
72 kg	Guzel Manyurova; Kazakhstan	Gelegjamtsyn Naranchimeg; Mongolia	Yoshiko Inoue; Japan
72 kg	Guzel Manyurova; Kazakhstan	Gelegjamtsyn Naranchimeg; Mongolia	Li Dan; China

== Participating nations ==
231 competitors from 19 nations competed.

- China (21)
- Chinese Taipei (16)
- India (21)
- Iran (14)
- Japan (21)
- Jordan (4)
- Kazakhstan (21)
- Kyrgyzstan (17)
- Mongolia (14)
- North Korea (12)
- Qatar (2)
- Singapore (2)
- South Korea (19)
- Tajikistan (7)
- Thailand (5)
- Turkmenistan (10)
- United Arab Emirates (1)
- Uzbekistan (16)
- Vietnam (8)
