= 2010 European Wrestling Championships =

2010 European Championship
- Host city: Baku, Azerbaijan
- Dates: 13–18 April
- Stadium: Heydar Aliyev Sports and Exhibition Complex

Champions
- Freestyle: Russia
- Greco-Roman: Russia
- Women: Russia

The 2010 FILA European Wrestling Championships was held in Baku, Azerbaijan, from 13 April to 18 April 2010.

Because of the ongoing dispute over Karabakh between Armenia and Azerbaijan, Armenia chose not to compete at this event for the safety of their wrestlers.

== Medal table ==
Rank	Nation	Gold	Silver	Bronze	Total
1	Russia (RUS)	8	5	3	16
2	Azerbaijan (AZE)	7	2	1	10
3	Turkey (TUR)	2	1	3	6
4	Bulgaria (BUL)	1	3	3	7
5	Belarus (BLR)	1	1	3	5
6	Sweden (SWE)	1	0	2	3
7	Latvia (LAT)	1	0	0	1
8	Ukraine (UKR)	0	2	5	7
9	Georgia (GEO)	0	2	2	4
9	Romania (ROM)	0	2	2	4
11	France (FRA)	0	1	4	5
12	Great Britain (GBR)	0	1	0	1
12	Serbia (SRB)	0	1	0	1
14	Hungary (HUN)	0	0	4	4
15	Germany (GER)	0	0	3	3
15	Poland (POL)	0	0	3	3
17	Croatia (CRO)	0	0	1	1
17	Lithuania (LTU)	0	0	1	1
17	Moldova (MDA)	0	0	1	1
17	Spain (ESP)	0	0	1	1
Totals (20 entries)		21	21	42	84

== Team ranking ==
Rank	Men's freestyle		Men's Greco-Roman		Women's freestyle	
Rank	Team	Points	Team	Points	Team	Points
1	Russia	61	Russia	52	Russia	52
2	Azerbaijan	50	Turkey	38	Ukraine	38
3	Bulgaria	42	Ukraine	38	Bulgaria	34
4	Georgia	34	Azerbaijan	31	Azerbaijan	33
5	Turkey	34	Georgia	27	Sweden	28
6	Ukraine	27	Belarus	26	France	28
7	Belarus	23	Hungary	25	Poland	28
8	Moldova	21	Romania	19	Romania	25
9	Poland	20	Croatia	17	Belarus	19
10	Germany	16	France	16	Turkey	14

== Medal summary ==
=== Men's freestyle ===
Event	Gold	Silver	Bronze
55 kg	(Azerbaijan) Mahmud Magomedov	(Bulgaria) Radoslav Velikov	(Germany) Marcel Ewald
55 kg	(Azerbaijan) Mahmud Magomedov	(Bulgaria) Radoslav Velikov	(Russia) Viktor Lebedev
60 kg	(Russia) Opan Sat	(Georgia (country)) Malkhaz Zarkua	(Moldova) Andrei Perpelita
60 kg	(Russia) Opan Sat	(Georgia (country)) Malkhaz Zarkua	(Ukraine) Vasyl Fedoryshyn
66 kg	(Azerbaijan) Jabrayil Hasanov	(Russia) Magomedmurad Gadzhiev	(Georgia (country)) Otar Tushishvili
66 kg	(Azerbaijan) Jabrayil Hasanov	(Russia) Magomedmurad Gadzhiev	(Poland) Adam Sobieraj
74 kg	(Russia) Denis Tsargush	(Bulgaria) Kiril Terziev	(Azerbaijan) Chamsulvara Chamsulvarayev
74 kg	(Russia) Denis Tsargush	(Bulgaria) Kiril Terziev	(Turkey) Batuhan Demirçin
84 kg	(Russia) Anzor Urishev	(Azerbaijan) Sharif Sharifov	(Romania) Stefan Gheorghita
84 kg	(Russia) Anzor Urishev	(Azerbaijan) Sharif Sharifov	(Bulgaria) Mikhail Ganev
96 kg	(Azerbaijan) Khetag Gazyumov	(Georgia (country)) Giorgi Gogshelidze	(Turkey) Serhat Balcı
96 kg	(Azerbaijan) Khetag Gazyumov	(Georgia (country)) Giorgi Gogshelidze	(Belarus) Aliaksei Dubko
120 kg	(Russia) Beylal Makhov	(Turkey) Fatih Çakıroğlu	(Belarus) Aliaksei Shamarau
120 kg	(Russia) Beylal Makhov	(Turkey) Fatih Çakıroğlu	(Bulgaria) Dimitar Kumchev

=== Men's Greco-Roman ===
Event	Gold	Silver	Bronze
55 kg	(Azerbaijan) Elchin Aliyev	(Russia) Nazyr Mankiev	(Ukraine) Vyuhar Rahimov
55 kg	(Azerbaijan) Elchin Aliyev	(Russia) Nazyr Mankiev	(Hungary) Péter Módos
60 kg	(Azerbaijan) Hasan Aliyev	(Ukraine) Kostyantyn Balitskyy	(Russia) Zaur Kuramagomedov
60 kg	(Azerbaijan) Hasan Aliyev	(Ukraine) Kostyantyn Balitskyy	(Croatia) Tonimir Sokol
66 kg	(Russia) Ambako Vachadze	(Romania) Ion Panait	(France) Steeve Guénot
66 kg	(Russia) Ambako Vachadze	(Romania) Ion Panait	(Hungary) Tamás Lőrincz
74 kg	(Belarus) Aliaksandr Kikiniou	(Azerbaijan) Elvin Mursaliyev	(Ukraine) Dmytro Pyshkov
74 kg	(Belarus) Aliaksandr Kikiniou	(Azerbaijan) Elvin Mursaliyev	(Hungary) Péter Bácsi
84 kg	(Turkey) Nazmi Avluca	(Russia) Alexei Mishin	(France) Mélonin Noumonvi
84 kg	(Turkey) Nazmi Avluca	(Russia) Alexei Mishin	(Germany) Jan Fischer
96 kg	(Russia) Aslanbek Khushtov	(Belarus) Tsimafei Dzeinichenka	(Georgia (country)) Soso Jabidze
96 kg	(Russia) Aslanbek Khushtov	(Belarus) Tsimafei Dzeinichenka	(Turkey) Cenk İldem
120 kg	(Turkey) Rıza Kayaalp	(Serbia) Radomir Petković	(Sweden) Johan Eurén
120 kg	(Turkey) Rıza Kayaalp	(Serbia) Radomir Petković	(Lithuania) Mindaugas Mizgaitis

=== Women's freestyle ===
Event	Gold	Silver	Bronze
48 kg	(Russia) Lorissa Oorzhak	(United Kingdom) Yana Stadnik	(France) Melanie Lesaffre
48 kg	(Russia) Lorissa Oorzhak	(United Kingdom) Yana Stadnik	(Poland) Iwona Matkowska
51 kg	(Sweden) Sofia Mattsson	(Romania) Estera Dobre	(Ukraine) Oleksandra Kohut
51 kg	(Sweden) Sofia Mattsson	(Romania) Estera Dobre	(Germany) Alexandra Engelhardt
55 kg	(Latvia) Anastasija Grigorjeva	(Russia) Natalia Golts	(Poland) Agata Pietrzyk
55 kg	(Latvia) Anastasija Grigorjeva	(Russia) Natalia Golts	(Romania) Ana Paval
59 kg	(Azerbaijan) Sona Ahmadli	(Bulgaria) Taybe Yusein	(France) Meryem Seloum Fatah
59 kg	(Azerbaijan) Sona Ahmadli	(Bulgaria) Taybe Yusein	(Hungary) Marianna Sastin
63 kg	(Russia) Lubov Volosova	(France) Audrey Prieto-Bokhashvili	(Ukraine) Yuliya Ostapchuk
63 kg	(Russia) Lubov Volosova	(France) Audrey Prieto-Bokhashvili	(Bulgaria) Elina Vaseva
67 kg	(Azerbaijan) Nadya Sementsova	(Ukraine) Kateryna Burmistrova	(Russia) Alena Kartashova
67 kg	(Azerbaijan) Nadya Sementsova	(Ukraine) Kateryna Burmistrova	(Belarus) Iryna Tsyrkevich
72 kg	(Bulgaria) Stanka Zlateva	(Russia) Ekaterina Bukina	(Sweden) Emma Weberg
72 kg	(Bulgaria) Stanka Zlateva	(Russia) Ekaterina Bukina	(Spain) Maider Unda
