= Wrestling at the 2012 Summer Olympics – Women's freestyle 48 kg =

Women's freestyle 48 kg at the Games of the XXX Olympiad
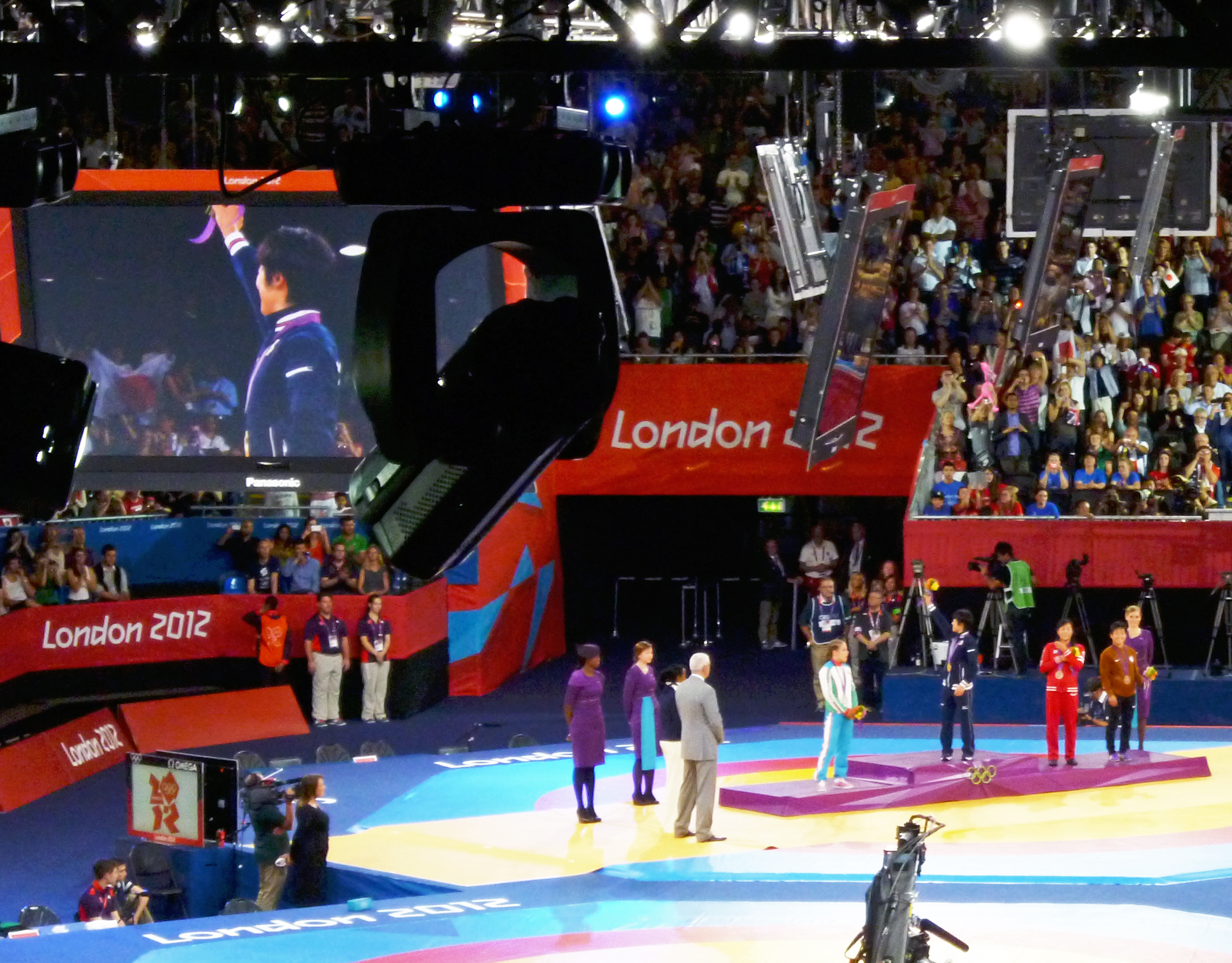
- Women's freestyle 48 kg victory ceremony
- Venue: ExCeL London
- Date: 8 August 2012
- Competitors: 19 from 19 nations

Medalists
1st place, gold medalist(s)		Hitomi Obara	Japan
2nd place, silver medalist(s)		Mariya Stadnik	Azerbaijan
3rd place, bronze medalist(s)		Carol Huynh	Canada
3rd place, bronze medalist(s)		Clarissa Chun	United States

Women's freestyle 48 kilograms competition at the 2012 Summer Olympics in London, United Kingdom, took place on 8 August at ExCeL London.

This freestyle wrestling competition consists of a single-elimination tournament, with a repechage used to determine the winner of two bronze medals. The two finalists face off for gold and silver medals. Each wrestler who loses to one of the two finalists moves into the repechage, culminating in a pair of bronze medal matches featuring the semifinal losers each facing the remaining repechage opponent from their half of the bracket.

Each bout consists of up to three rounds, lasting two minutes apiece. The wrestler who scores more points in each round is the winner of that rounds; the bout ends when one wrestler has won two rounds (and thus the match).

== Schedule ==
All times are British Summer Time (UTC+01:00)

Date	Time	Event
8 August 2012	13:00	Qualification rounds
8 August 2012	17:45	Repechage
8 August 2012	18:45	Finals

== Results ==
Legend

- F — Won by fall

=== Final ===
Final
Hitomi Obara (JPN)	0	1	2
Mariya Stadnik (AZE)	4	0	0

=== Top half ===
Qualifications

1/8 finals
Zhuldyz Eshimova (KAZ)	0	1
Vanesa Kaladzinskaya (BLR)	5	4^{F}
Carol Huynh (CAN)	3^{F}
Nguyễn Thị Lụa (VIE)	0
Isabelle Sambou (SEN)	7	6
Tanoh Benie (CIV)	0	0
Maroi Mezien (TUN)	0
Hitomi Obara (JPN)	4^{F}

1/4 finals
Vanesa Kaladzinskaya (BLR)	0	0
Carol Huynh (CAN)	6	3
Isabelle Sambou (SEN)	0	0
Hitomi Obara (JPN)	2	5

Semifinals
Carol Huynh (CAN)	0	1
Hitomi Obara (JPN)	2	2

=== Bottom half ===
Qualifications
Clarissa Chun (USA)	5	1
Zhao Shasha (CHN)	0	0
Davaasükhiin Otgontsetseg (MGL)	2	2
Carolina Castillo (COL)	1	0
Iwona Matkowska (POL)	1	3
Patricia Bermúdez (ARG)	0	0

1/8 finals
Mayelis Caripá (VEN)	2	2
Alexandra Engelhardt (GER)	0	1
Iryna Merleni (UKR)	1	4
Kim Hyung-joo (KOR)	1	0
Mariya Stadnik (AZE)	2	3
Clarissa Chun (USA)	0	0
Davaasükhiin Otgontsetseg (MGL)	1	1	0
Iwona Matkowska (POL)	0	2	4^{F}

1/4 finals
Mayelis Caripá (VEN)	0
Iryna Merleni (UKR)	4^{F}
Mariya Stadnik (AZE)	2	4
Iwona Matkowska (POL)	0	1

Semifinals
Iryna Merleni (UKR)	0	0
Mariya Stadnik (AZE)	1	3

=== Repechage ===
Repechage round 2
Maroi Mezien (TUN)	4	0	0
Isabelle Sambou (SEN)	0	2	4^{F}
Clarissa Chun (USA)	0	4^{F}
Iwona Matkowska (POL)	1	0

Bronze medals
Isabelle Sambou (SEN)	0	0
Carol Huynh (CAN)	1	3
Clarissa Chun (USA)	1	3
Iryna Merleni (UKR)	0	0

== Final standing ==
Rank	Athlete
1st place, gold medalist(s)	Hitomi Obara (JPN)
2nd place, silver medalist(s)	Mariya Stadnik (AZE)
3rd place, bronze medalist(s)	Carol Huynh (CAN)
3rd place, bronze medalist(s)	Clarissa Chun (USA)
5	Isabelle Sambou (SEN)
5	Iryna Merleni (UKR)
7	Iwona Matkowska (POL)
8	Vanesa Kaladzinskaya (BLR)
9	Davaasükhiin Otgontsetseg (MGL)
10	Mayelis Caripá (VEN)
11	Alexandra Engelhardt (GER)
11	Carolina Castillo (COL)
13	Kim Hyung-joo (KOR)
14	Maroi Mezien (TUN)
15	Zhuldyz Eshimova (KAZ)
16	Nguyễn Thị Lụa (VIE)
17	Patricia Bermúdez (ARG)
18	Zhao Shasha (CHN)
19	Tanoh Benie (CIV)
