= Sofia Mattsson =

Swedish wrestler (born 1989)

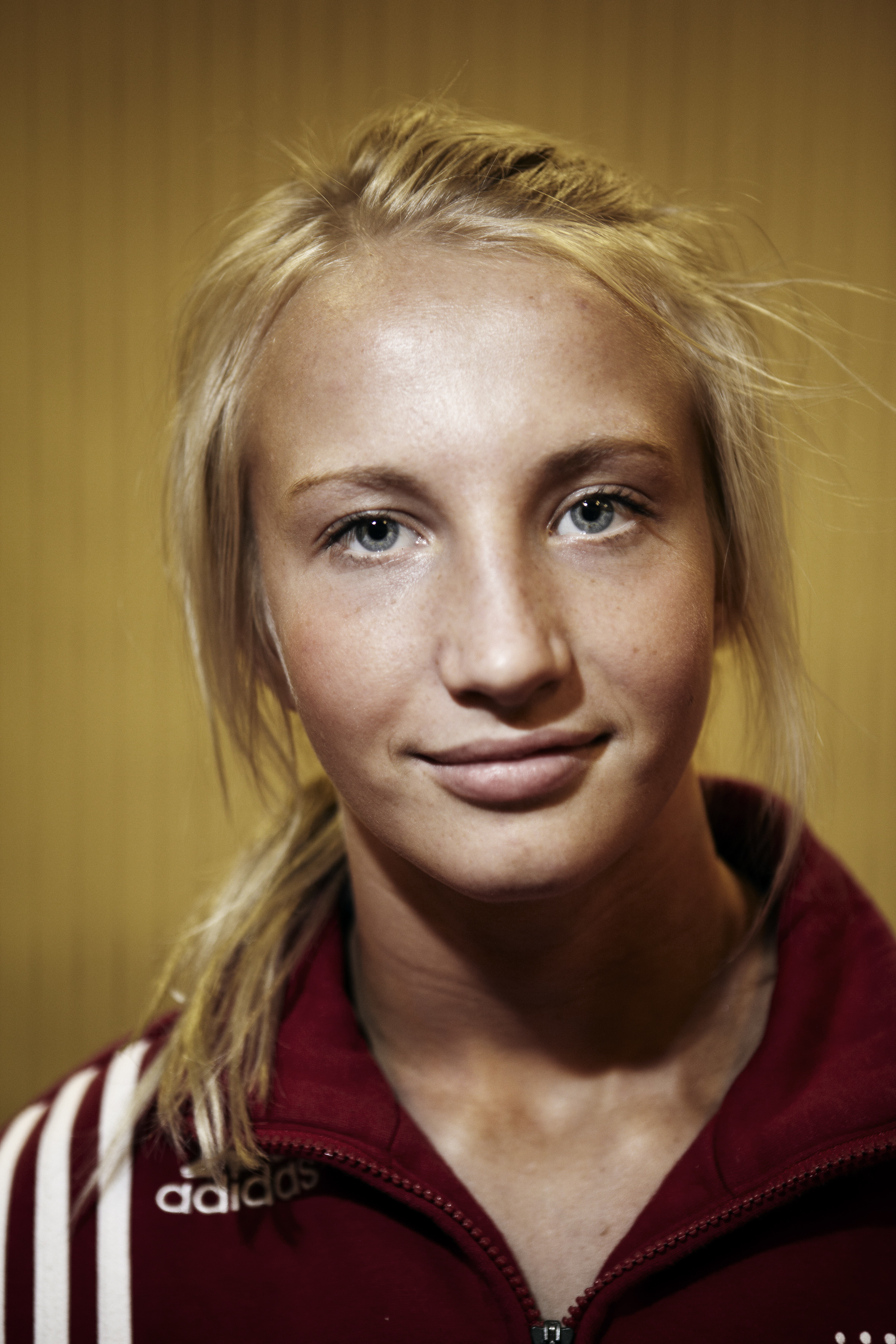
- Mattsson in 2010

Personal information
- Full name: Sofia Magdalena Mattsson
- Nationality: Swedish
- Born: 11 November 1989 (age 36) Gällivare, Sweden
- Home town: Ljungbyhed
- Height: 164 cm (5 ft 5 in)
- Weight: 53 kg (117 lb)

Sport
- Country: Sweden
- Sport: Freestyle wrestling
- Club: Gällivare SK
- Coached by: Fariborz Besarati
Medal record
Women's freestyle wrestling
Representing Sweden
Olympic Games
Bronze medal – third place	2016 Rio de Janeiro	53 kg
World Championships
Gold medal – first place	2009 Herning	51 kg
Bronze medal – third place	2010 Moscow	51 kg
Silver medal – second place	2011 Istanbul	59 kg
Silver medal – second place	2013 Budapest	55 kg
Silver medal – second place	2014 Tashkent	53 kg
Silver medal – second place	2015 Las Vegas	53 kg
European Games
Gold medal – first place	2015 Baku	55 kg
Gold medal – first place	2019 Minsk	53 kg
European Championships
Bronze medal – third place	2007 Sofia	48 kg
Silver medal – second place	2008 Tampere	51 kg
Gold medal – first place	2010 Baku	51 kg
Silver medal – second place	2012 Belgrade	55 kg
Gold medal – first place	2013 Tbilisi	55 kg
Gold medal – first place	2014 Vantaa	55 kg
Gold medal – first place	2016 Riga	53 kg
Bronze medal – third place	2020 Rome	55 kg

Sofia Magdalena Mattsson (born 11 November 1989) is a Swedish wrestler, who has won a World Championship, four European championships and an Olympic bronze medal.

== Profile ==
Born in Gällivare, she is one of the highest-ranking female wrestlers in Europe. She wrestles in the 48 kilo division for the Gällivare SK Wrestling club, coached by Håkan Johansson and Kalle Taivalsaari. Since 2001, she has won eleven Swedish National Championships (six at cadet level, two at junior level and three at senior level).

In 2007 she competed at the European Championship in Sofia, her first ever international championship at senior level. Despite her young age and inexperience, she won her first match; however, in the following match she was defeated by the Russian wrestler Larisa Oorzhak (who went on to win the gold medal). In the repechage, Mattsson defeated her other two opponents and won the bronze medal.

In August 2007, Mattsson became Junior World Champion for the second time after she defeated the Japanese wrestler Fuyuko Mimura in Beijing.

In September the same year, she competed at her first ever World Championship at senior level in Baku, Azerbaijan, where she placed 8th, assuring herself qualification for the 2008 Summer Olympics.

In April 2008 the young Swedish wrestler won a silver medal at her second ever European Championship at senior level. That summer, she was defeated in the second round at the Olympics by Clarissa Chun.

In September 2009, Mattsson won the Senior World Championship in 51 kg.

At the 2012 Summer Olympics, Mattsson competed in the women's lightweight (-55 kg) division. She beat Sündeviin Byambatseren in the first round and Marwa Amri in the second, but lost to Valeria Zholobova in the quarterfinals.

In 2014, Mattsson competed on the Swedish version of the television show Fort Boyard.

In June 2015, she competed in the inaugural European Games, for Sweden in wrestling, more specifically, the women's freestyle 55 kg division. She earned a gold medal.

On 9 March 2016 Mattsson won the 2016 European Wrestling Championships, she won all wrestling matches by fall. She won the bronze medal in 53 kg (featherweight) at the 2016 Olympic Games in Rio de Janeiro. She did this by beating Odunayo Adekuoroye in the last 16, then Katarzyna Krawczyk in the quarterfinals. She lost to eventual gold medalist Helen Maroulis in the semifinals. Mattsson was entered into the repechage, where she beat Zhong Xuechun to win a bronze medal.

In March 2021, she qualified at the European Qualification Tournament to compete at the 2020 Summer Olympics in Tokyo, Japan. She competed in the women's 53 kg event.

She is in the team of Haryana Hammers pro wrestling season2 held in New Delhi.

== National results ==
- 2008 – 1st at the Swedish National Championship
- 2007 – 1st at the Junior Swedish National Championship
- 2007 – 1st at the Swedish National Championship
- 2006 – 1st at the Swedish National Championship
- 2006 – 1st at the Junior Swedish National Championship
- 2006 – 1st at the Cadet Swedish National Championship
- 2005 – 1st at the Cadet Swedish National Championship
- 2004 – 1st at the Cadet Swedish National Championship
- 2003 – 1st at the Cadet Swedish National Championship
- 2002 – 1st at the Cadet Swedish National Championship
- 2001 – 1st at the Cadet Swedish National Championship

== International results ==
=== Senior ===
Year	Competition	Venue	Position	Event	Notes
2007	European Championships	Sofia, Bulgaria	3rd	48 kg	
2007	World Championships	Baku, Azerbaijan	8th	48 kg	
2008	European Championships	Tampere, Finland	2nd	51 kg	
2008	Olympic Games	Beijing, China	12th	48 kg	
2009	European Championships	Vilnius, Lithuania	10th	51 kg	
2009	World Championships	Herning, Denmark	1st	51 kg	
2010	European Championships	Baku, Azerbaijan	1st	51 kg	
2010	World Championships	Moscow, Russia	3rd	51 kg	
2011	World Championships	Istanbul, Turkey	2nd	59 kg	
2012	European Championships	Belgrade, Serbia	2nd	55 kg	
2012	Olympic Games	London, Great Britain	7th	55 kg	
2013	European Championships	Tbilisi, Georgia	1st	55 kg	
2014	European Championships	Vantaa, Finland	1st	55 kg	
2015	2015 World Wrestling Championships	Las Vegas, United States	2nd	53 kg	
2016	Olympic Games	Rio de Janeiro, Brazil	3rd	53 kg	

=== Junior and cadet ===
- 2007 – 1st at the Junior World Championship in Beijing, China
- 2006 – 1st at the Junior World Championship in Guatemala
- 2006 – 1st at the Cadet European Championship in Turkey
- 2005 – 1st at the Cadet European Championship in Albania
- 2004 – 1st at the Cadet European Championship in Bulgaria

== Trivia ==
- At the European Championship in Sofia, the organisers of the event awarded her with the title "Miss Europe", a prize reserved for the prettiest wrestler at the tournament. However, she refused to accept the prize and commented: "This is not part of the sport. We are here to excel and win at wrestling. There are some people who compete in that other thing too but we don't do that here".
