= Iwona Matkowska =

Polish freestyle wrestler (born 1982)

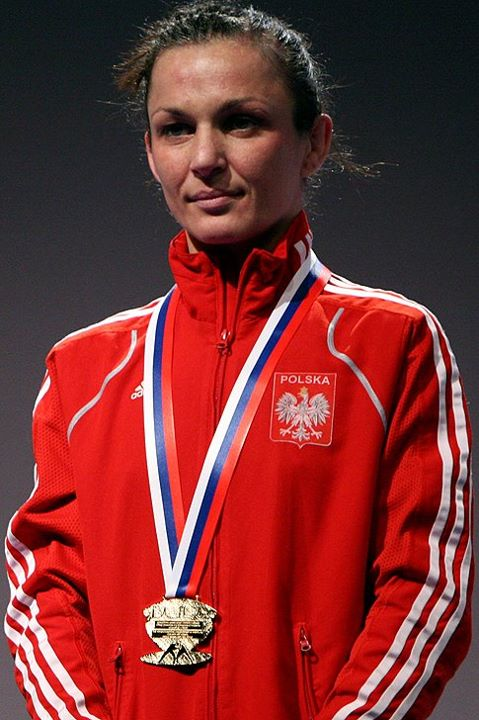

Personal information
- Full name: Iwona Nina Matkowska
- Born: 28 May 1982 (age 44) Żary, Poland
Medal record
Women's freestyle wrestling
Representing Poland
World Championships
Silver medal – second place	2014 Tashkent	48 kg
Bronze medal – third place	2006 Guangzhou	48 kg
European Championships
Gold medal – first place	2012 Belgrad	51 kg
Bronze medal – third place	2008 Tampere	48 kg
Bronze medal – third place	2010 Baku	48 kg
Bronze medal – third place	2011 Dortmund	48 kg
European Games
Bronze medal – third place	2015 Baku	48 kg

Iwona Nina Matkowska-Sadowska (Polish pronunciation: [iˈvɔna ˈnina matˈkɔfska]; born 28 May 1982 in Żary) is a Polish freestyle wrestler. She competed in the freestyle 48 kg event at the 2012 Summer Olympics; after beating Patricia Bermúdez in the qualifications and Davaasükhiin Otgontsetseg in the 1/8 finals, she was defeated by Mariya Stadnik in the quarterfinals and eliminated by Clarissa Chun in the repechage round. In June 2015, she competed in the inaugural European Games, for Poland in wrestling, more specifically, Women's Freestyle in the 48 kilogram range. She earned a bronze medal.

In March 2021, she competed at the European Qualification Tournament in Budapest, Hungary hoping to qualify for the 2020 Summer Olympics in Tokyo, Japan.
