= 2009 World Wrestling Championships – Women's freestyle 55 kg =

Women's freestyle 55 kg at the 2009 World Championships
- Venue: Messecenter Herning
- Dates: 24 September 2009
- Competitors: 27 from 27 nations

Medalists
| gold medal | Saori Yoshida | Japan |
| silver medal | Sona Ahmadli | Azerbaijan |
| bronze medal | Alena Filipava | Belarus |
| bronze medal | Tonya Verbeek | Canada |

The women's freestyle 55 kilograms is a competition featured at the 2009 World Wrestling Championships, and was held at the Messecenter Herning exhibition center in Herning, Denmark on September 24.

This freestyle wrestling competition consists of a single-elimination tournament, with a repechage used to determine the winner of two bronze medals.

== Results ==
Legend

- F — Won by fall

=== Final ===
| Final |
| Sona Ahmadli (AZE) | 0 | 0 |
| Saori Yoshida (JPN) | 3 | 6 |

=== Top half ===
Round of 32
Lenka Martináková (CZE) | 4 | 0 | 1
Gudrun Høie (NOR) | 1 | 1 | 4
Tamara Kazaryan (UZB) | 3 | 0
Geeta Phogat (IND) | 4 | 4
Nanna Pedersen (DEN) | 0 | 0
Marwa Amri (TUN) | 1 | 1

Round of 16
Sona Ahmadli (AZE) | 1 | 0 | 2
Alena Filipava (BLR) | 0 | 1 | 2
Chen Juan (CHN) | 0 | 4 | 0
Valentina Minguzzi (ITA) | 2 | 1 | 1
Tatiana Suarez (USA) | 3 | 6
Gudrun Høie (NOR) | 0 | 0
Geeta Phogat (IND) | 1 | 2
Marwa Amri (TUN) | 0 | 0

Quarterfinals
Sona Ahmadli (AZE) | 1 | 2
Valentina Minguzzi (ITA) | 0 | 0
Tatiana Suarez (USA) | 3 | 1 | 3^{F}
Geeta Phogat (IND) | 0 | 4 | 1

Semifinals
Sona Ahmadli (AZE) | 1 | 2
Tatiana Suarez (USA) | 0 | 1

=== Bottom half ===
Round of 32
Maminirina Rafaliharisolo (MAD) | 0 | 0
Saori Yoshida (JPN) | 8 | 7
Anna Gomis (FRA) | 0 | 1 | 2
Natalia Golts (RUS) | 2 | 0 | 0
Minerva Montero (ESP) | 0 | 0
Ana Maria Pavăl (ROU) | 2 | 1
Nataliya Synyshyn (UKR) | 4^{F}
Um Ji-eun (KOR) | 0
Aiyim Abdildina (KAZ) | 1 | 5^{F}
Nurzat Shailobaeva (KGZ) | 0 | 0
Lovina Odohi (NGR) | 2 | 5
Yuragiin Gandolgor (MGL) | 0 | 2^{F}
Tonya Verbeek (CAN) | 2 | 7
Sylwia Bileńska (POL) | 0 | 0
Choe Jong-bok (PRK) | 1 | 3 | 2
Marcia Andrades (VEN) | 1 | 0 | 0

Round of 16
Saori Yoshida (JPN) | 1 | 2
Anna Gomis (FRA) | 0 | 1
Ana Maria Pavăl (ROU) | 1 | 2 | 6^{F}
Nataliya Synyshyn (UKR) | 1 | 0 | 3
Aiyim Abdildina (KAZ) | 3 | 2
Yuragiin Gandolgor (MGL) | 1 | 0
Tonya Verbeek (CAN) | 6 | 7
Choe Jong-bok (PRK) | 0 | 0

Quarterfinals
Saori Yoshida (JPN) | 3 | 3^{F}
Ana Maria Pavăl (ROU) | 0 | 0
Aiyim Abdildina (KAZ) | 1 | 0
Tonya Verbeek (CAN) | 3 | 5

Semifinals
Saori Yoshida (JPN) | 3 | 3
Tonya Verbeek (CAN) | 0 | 2

=== Repechage ===
Repechage round 1
Maminirina Rafaliharisolo (MAD) | 0
Anna Gomis (FRA) | 4^{F}

Repechage round 2
Alena Filipava (BLR) | 1 | 4^{F}
Valentina Minguzzi (ITA) | 4 | 0
Anna Gomis (FRA) | 0 | 3 | 1
Ana Maria Pavăl (ROU) | 3 | 0 | 0

Bronze medals
Alena Filipava (BLR) | 5 | 3
Tatiana Suarez (USA) | 2 | 0
Anna Gomis (FRA) | 0 | 2
Tonya Verbeek (CAN) | 1 | 6
