= Sona Ahmadli =

Azerbaijani wrestler (born 1988)

Medal record

Representing Azerbaijan

Women's freestyle wrestling

World Championships
Silver medal – second place	2009 Herning	55 kg
Bronze medal – third place	2011 Istanbul	59 kg

European Championship
Gold medal – first place	2010 Baku	59 kg
Bronze medal – third place	2012 Belgrade	59 kg

Women's judo

European Cadet Championships
Silver medal – second place	2004 Rotterdam	63 kg

Sona Ahmadli (born 5 October 1988 in Baku) is a wrestler from Azerbaijan.
