= 2014 European Wrestling Championships – Women's freestyle 48 kg =

Wrestling competitions

The women's freestyle 48 kg is a competition featured at the 2014 European Wrestling Championships, and was held in Vantaa, Finland on April 2.

== Medalists ==
Gold	Mariya Stadnik; Azerbaijan
Silver	Natalya Pulkovska; Ukraine
Bronze	Fredrika Petersson; Sweden
Bronze	Nadezhda Fedorova; Russia

== Results ==
Legend

- F — Won by fall

=== Final ===
Final
Natalya Pulkovska (UKR)	0
Mariya Stadnik (AZE)	11

=== Top half ===
Round of 32

Round of 16
Silvia Felice (ITA)	6^{F}
Violeta Ponomarjova (LAT)	0
Elitsa Yankova (BUL)	4
Fredrika Petersson (SWE)	7
Anna Łukasiak (POL)	8
Liliana Santos (POR)	0
Natalya Pulkovska (UKR)	16^{F}
Emilia Cîrîcu (MDA)	5

Quarterfinals
Silvia Felice (ITA)	0
Fredrika Petersson (SWE)	2
Anna Łukasiak (POL)	0
Natalya Pulkovska (UKR)	8

Semifinals
Fredrika Petersson (SWE)	0
Natalya Pulkovska (UKR)	4^{F}

=== Bottom half ===
Round of 32
Nadezhda Fedorova (RUS)	6^{F}
Sarianne Savola (FIN)	3
Mercédesz Dénes (HUN)	10
Lenka Matejová (SVK)	0
Sümeyye Sezer (TUR)	10
Nekane Cepas (ESP)	0

Round of 16
Mădălina Linguraru (ROU)	4
Viyaleta Chyryk (BLR)	2
Jaqueline Schellin (GER)	5
Julie Sabatié (FRA)	6
Mariya Stadnik (AZE)	14
Nadezhda Fedorova (RUS)	2
Mercédesz Dénes (HUN)	6^{F}
Sümeyye Sezer (TUR)	1

Quarterfinals
Mădălina Linguraru (ROU)	6
Julie Sabatié (FRA)	2
Mariya Stadnik (AZE)	10
Mercédesz Dénes (HUN)	0

Semifinals
Mădălina Linguraru (ROU)	0
Mariya Stadnik (AZE)	11

=== Repechage ===
Repechage round 2
Emilia Cîrîcu (MDA)	6
Anna Łukasiak (POL)	14
Nadezhda Fedorova (RUS)	6^{F}
Mercédesz Dénes (HUN)	0

Bronze medals
Anna Łukasiak (POL)	4
Fredrika Petersson (SWE)	6
Nadezhda Fedorova (RUS)	3
Mădălina Linguraru (ROU)	0
