= Vanessa Boubryemm =

French freestyle wrestler

Personal information
- Nationality: France
- Born: 16 January 1982 (age 44) Tourcoing, France
- Height: 1.66 m (5 ft 5 1/2 in)
- Weight: 48 kg (106 lb)

Sport
- Sport: Wrestling
- Event: Freestyle
- Club: Lutte Club Tourcoing
- Coached by: Gerard Santoro (2003–2010); Nodar Bokashvili (2010– )
Medal record
Women's freestyle wrestling
Representing France
Mediterranean Games
Gold medal – first place	2005 Almería	51 kg
World Championships
Silver medal – second place	2005 Budapest	51 kg
Bronze medal – third place	2008 Tokyo	51 kg
European Championships
Gold medal – first place	2006 Moscow	51 kg
Silver medal – second place	2008 Tampere	48 kg
Bronze medal – third place	2005 Varna	51 kg

Vanessa Boubryemm (born 16 January 1982 in Tourcoing) is an amateur French freestyle wrestler, who played for the women's flyweight category. She is a three-time national wrestling champion, a two-time medalist at the World Championships, and a three-time medalist for the 48 and 51 kg classes at the European Championships. She also won a gold medal in the women's 51 kg division at the 2005 Mediterranean Games in Almería, Spain. Boubryemm is a member of Lutte Club Tourcoing, and is currently coached and trained by Nodar Bokashvili.

Boubryemm represented France at the 2008 Summer Olympics in Beijing, where she competed for the women's 48 kg class. She defeated Venezuela's Mayelis Caripá and Russia's Zamira Rakhmanova in the preliminaries, before losing out the quarterfinal match to U.S. wrestler Clarissa Chun, with a two-set technical score (1–6, 2–6), and a classification point score of 1–3.
