= Zhao Shasha =

Chinese freestyle wrestler (born 1987)

Personal information
- Born: September 17, 1987 (age 38) Binzhou, Shandong, China
- Height: 160 cm (5 ft 3 in)

Sport
- Weight class: 48–51 kg (106–112 lb)
Medal record
Women's freestyle wrestling
Representing China
World Championships
Bronze medal – third place	2010 Moscow	48 kg
Bronze medal – third place	2011 Istanbul	48 kg
Asian Championships
Gold medal – first place	2010 New Delhi	48 kg
Gold medal – first place	2011 Tashkent	51 kg

Zhao Shasha (Chinese: 赵 沙沙, born September 17, 1987) is a female wrestler from China who competed at the 2012 Summer Olympics in the women's freestyle 48 kg event.

== See also ==
- China at the 2012 Summer Olympics
