= Yu Horiuchi =

Japanese sport wrestler

Medal record

Women's wrestling

Representing Japan

World Championships
| Silver medal – second place | 2010 Moscow | 51 kg |

Yu Horiuchi (堀内優, Horiuchi Yū) (born December 23, 1990) is a female wrestler from Japan. She won a silver medal at the 2010 World Wrestling Championships in Moscow.
