= Lyudmyla Balushka =

Ukrainian freestyle wrestler

Personal information
- Nationality: Ukrainian
- Born: July 27, 1985 (age 40) Lviv, Ukraine

Sport
- Sport: Sport wrestling
- Event: Freestyle
Medal record
Women's freestyle wrestling
Representing Ukraine
World Championships
Bronze medal – third place	2009 Herning	48 kg
World Cup
Gold medal – first place	2009 Taiyuan	48 кг
European Championships
Gold medal – first place	2012 Belgrad	48 кг
Junior World Championships
Gold medal – first place	2001 Istanbul	44 kg
Junior European Championships
Gold medal – first place	2002 Tirana	43 кг

Lyudmyla Balushka (born July 27, 1985, in Lviv) is a female wrestler from Ukraine.

She was educated at the Lviv State University of International Affairs, and the Lviv State School of Physical Culture.
