= Patricia Bermúdez =

Argentine freestyle wrestler

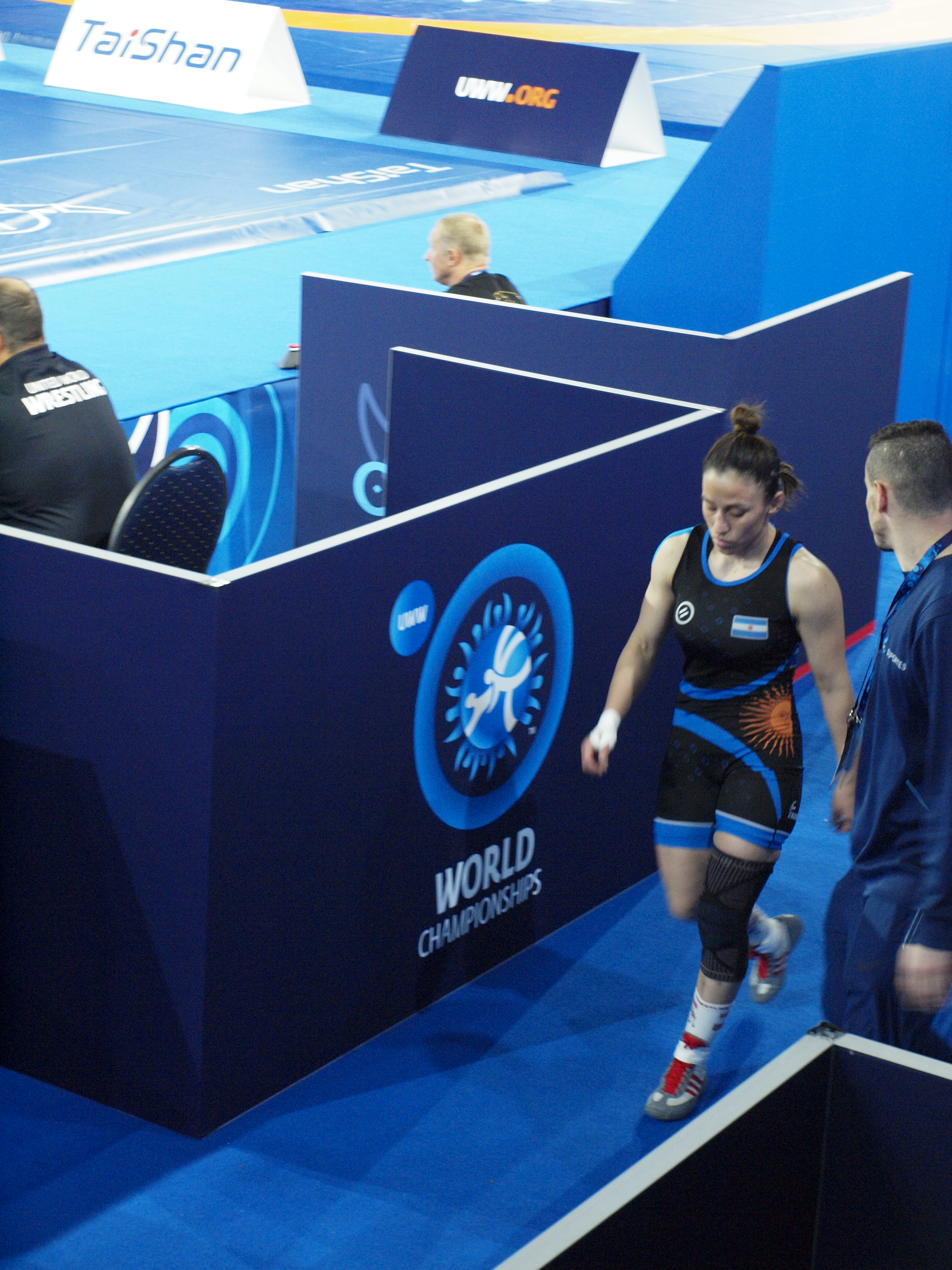
- Bermúdez at the 2021 World Wrestling Championships in Oslo, Norway

Personal information
- Full name: Patricia Alejandra Bermúdez
- Born: 5 February 1987 (age 39)
- Height: 150 cm (4 ft 11 in)

Sport
- Country: Argentina
- Sport: Amateur wrestling
- Weight class: 50kg
- Event: Freestyle
Medal record
Women's freestyle wrestling
Representing Argentina
Pan American Championships
Gold medal – first place	2012 Colorado	51 kg
Silver medal – second place	2011 Rionegro	51 kg
Bronze medal – third place	2013 Panama	51 kg
Bronze medal – third place	2017 Bahia	48 kg
Bronze medal – third place	2019 Buenos Aires	50 kg
Bronze medal – third place	2021 Guatemala City	50 kg
Bronze medal – third place	2022 Acapulco	50 kg
Bronze medal – third place	2023 Buenos Aires	50 kg
South American Championships
Gold medal – first place	2013 Santiago	51 kg
Gold medal – first place	2014 Lima	53 kg
Gold medal – first place	2015 Buenos Aires	48 kg
Pan American Games
Bronze medal – third place	2011 Guadalajara	48 kg
South American Games
Silver medal – second place	2014 Santiago	48 kg
Bronze medal – third place	2010 Medellin	51 kg
Dan Kolov - Nikola Petrov Tournament
Silver medal – second place	2016 Sofia	48 kg
Bronze medal – third place	2023 Sofia	53 kg

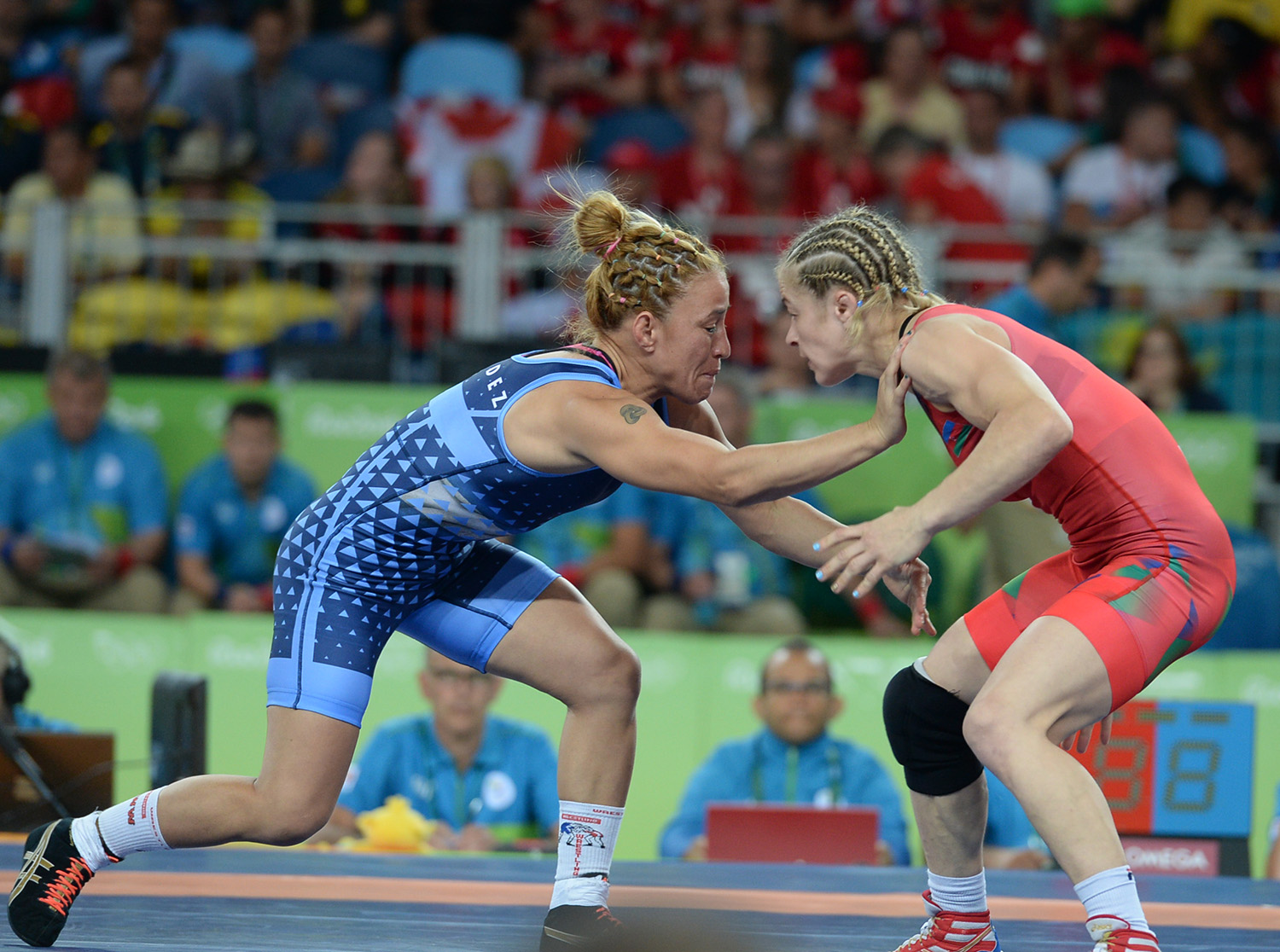
Bermúdez (left) against Mariya Stadnik during the 2016 Olympics

Patricia Alejandra Bermúdez (born 5 February 1987 in Santiago del Estero) is an Argentine freestyle wrestler. She competed in the freestyle 48 kg event at the 2012 Summer Olympics and was eliminated in the qualifications by Iwona Matkowska. She won the bronze medal at the 2011 Pan American Games.

In 2020, Bermúdez competed in the Pan American Olympic Qualification Tournament, held in Ottawa, Canada, without qualifying for the 2020 Summer Olympics in Tokyo, Japan. In 2021, she won one of the bronze medals in the women's 50 kg event at the 2021 Pan American Wrestling Championships held in Guatemala City, Guatemala. In October 2021, she was eliminated in her first match in the women's 50 kg event at the World Wrestling Championships held in Oslo, Norway.

Bermúdez won one of the bronze medals in her event at the 2022 Pan American Wrestling Championships held in Acapulco, Mexico. She also won one of the bronze medals in her event at the 2022 Tunis Ranking Series event held in Tunis, Tunisia. She competed in the 50 kg event at the 2022 World Wrestling Championships held in Belgrade, Serbia.

In 2023, Bermúdez won one of the bronze medals in her event at the Pan American Wrestling Championships held in Buenos Aires, Argentina.
