= Takako Saito (wrestler) =

Japanese wrestler (born 1983)

Medal record

Women's wrestling

Representing Japan

World Championships
Bronze medal – third place	2011 Istanbul	59 kg

Asian Championships
Gold medal – first place	2011 Tashkent	59 kg

Takako Saito (斉藤 貴子, Saitō Takako; born August 10, 1983) is a female wrestler from Japan.
