= Estera Dobre =

Romanian wrestler (born 1987)

Personal information
- Nationality: Romania
- Born: 10 February 1987 (age 39) Râmnicu Vâlcea, Romania
- Height: 1.59 m (5 ft 2 1/2 in)
- Weight: 48 kg (106 lb)

Sport
- Sport: Wrestling
- Event: Freestyle
- Club: CSA Steaua Bucuresti
- Coached by: Arpad Matefi
Medal record
Women's freestyle wrestling
Representing Romania
European Championships
Silver medal – second place	2009 Vilnius	48 kg
Silver medal – second place	2010 Baku	51 kg
Silver medal – second place	2011 Dortmund	51 kg
Silver medal – second place	2012 Belgrade	48 kg

Estera Dobre (born February 10, 1987, in Râmnicu Vâlcea) is an amateur Romanian wrestler, who competed in the women's flyweight category. Between 2009 and 2012, Dobre won a total of four silver medals for the 48 and 51 kg classes at the European Wrestling Championships. She was disqualified from the 2013 European Wrestling Championships on a positive doping sample and given a two-year ban. She is also a member of CSA Steaua Bucuresti, and is coached and trained by Arpad Matefi.

Dobre represented Romania at the 2008 Summer Olympics in Beijing, where she competed for the women's 48 kg class. She received a bye for the second preliminary round, before losing out to El Salvador's Íngrid Medrano, with a technical score of 8–12.
