= Ren Xuecheng =

Chinese freestyle wrestler

Personal information
- Born: 21 May 1985 (age 41)

Sport
- Country: China
- Sport: Amateur wrestling
- Event: Freestyle
Medal record
Women's freestyle wrestling
Representing China
World Championships
Gold medal – first place	2005 Budapest	48 kg
Silver medal – second place	2006 Guangzhou	48 kg
Silver medal – second place	2007 Baku	51 kg
Asian Championships
Gold medal – first place	2005 Wuhan	48 kg
Silver medal – second place	2008 Jeju City	48 kg

Ren Xuecheng (born 21 May 1985) is a Chinese freestyle wrestler. She won one gold and two silver medals at the World Wrestling Championships in the years 2005, 2006 and 2007. She also won the gold medal in the women's 48 kg event at the 2005 Asian Wrestling Championships and the silver medal in that event at the 2008 Asian Wrestling Championships.
