= Tatyana Akhmetova-Amanzhol =

Kazakhstani freestyle wrestler

Personal information
- Nationality: Kazakhstani
- Born: 17 October 1985 (age 40) Alma-Ata, Kazakh SSR, Soviet Union
- Height: 1.55 m (5 ft 1 in)
- Weight: 48 kg (106 lb)

Sport
- Sport: Wrestling
- Event: Freestyle
- Club: Dynamo Almaty
- Coached by: Shakir Tubluk
Medal record
Women's freestyle wrestling
Representing Kazakhstan
Asian Games
Bronze medal – third place	2014 Incheon	48 kg
Asian Championships
Gold medal – first place	2009 Pattaya	51 kg
Gold medal – first place	2013 New Delhi	51 kg
Gold medal – first place	2020 New Delhi	53 kg

Tatyana Akhmetova-Amanzhol (also Tatyana Bakatyuk, Kazakh: Татьяна Аманжол; born 17 October 1985 in Alma-Ata) is an amateur Kazakh freestyle wrestler, who wrestled in the women's flyweight category. In 2009, Bakatyuk won a gold medal for the 51 kg class at the Asian Wrestling Championships in Pattaya, Thailand, and at the FILA Golden Grand Prix in Baku, Azerbaijan.

Bakatyuk represented Kazakhstan at the 2008 Summer Olympics in Beijing, where she competed for the women's 48 kg class. She defeated Germany's Alexandra Engelhardt and El Salvador's Íngrid Medrano in the preliminary rounds, before losing out the semi-final match to Canada's Carol Huynh, who was able to score five points in two straight periods, leaving Bakatyuk without a single point. Because her opponent advanced further into the final, Bakatyuk automatically qualified for the bronze medal bout, where she was defeated by Azerbaijan's Mariya Stadnik, with a technical score of 1–10.

At the 2020 Asian Championships in New Delhi, she pulled off a stunning victory in the 53kg final over two-time world champion Mayu Mukaida of Japan. Mukaida was leading 8-0 when she attempted to turn Akhmetova-Amanzhol over for the points that would give her a technical fall victory. But Akhmetova-Amanzhol stopped the move midway to catch Mukaida on her back, then secured a victory by fall. It was her first Asian title since winning back-to-back golds in 2013 and 2014.

She competed in the women's 53 kg event at the 2020 Summer Olympics in Tokyo, Japan.
