= Zhuldyz Eshimova =

Kyrgyz-born Kazakhstani freestyle wrestler

Personal information
- Born: 2 January 1988 (age 38) Talas, Kirghiz SSR, Soviet Union
- Height: 152 cm (5 ft 0 in)

Sport
- Weight class: 48–53 kg (106–117 lb)
Medal record
Women's freestyle wrestling
Representing Kazakhstan
World Championships
Silver medal – second place	2008 Tokyo	48 kg
Bronze medal – third place	2011 Istanbul	48 kg
Asian Games
Silver medal – second place	2018 Jakarta	53 kg
Asian Championships
Gold medal – first place	2007 Bishkek	51 kg
Silver medal – second place	2008 Jeju City	51 kg
Silver medal – second place	2009 Pattaya	48 kg
Silver medal – second place	2010 New Delhi	51 kg
Bronze medal – third place	2018 Bishkek	53 kg
Bronze medal – third place	2022 Ulaanbaatar	53 kg
Bolat Turlykhanov Cup
Silver medal – second place	2022 Almaty	53 kg

Zhuldyz Eshimova (born 2 January 1988 in Talas) is a Kyrgyz-born female wrestler who competes for Kazakhstan. At the 2012 Summer Olympics, she competed in the women's -48 kg freestyle division, losing to Vanessa Kolodinskaya in the second round. At the 2016 Summer Olympics, she competed in the same division. She lost to eventual gold medalist Eri Tosaka in her first match. Because Tosaka reached the gold medal round, Eshimova took part in the repechage. She beat Haley Augello in the first round of the repechage, but lost to Sun Yanan in her bronze medal match.

In 2022, she competed at the Yasar Dogu Tournament held in Istanbul, Turkey. She won the bronze medal in her event at the 2022 Asian Wrestling Championships held in Ulaanbaatar, Mongolia. She competed in the 53 kg event at the 2022 World Wrestling Championships held in Belgrade, Serbia.

She competed at the 2024 Asian Wrestling Olympic Qualification Tournament in Bishkek, Kyrgyzstan hoping to qualify for the 2024 Summer Olympics in Paris, France. She was eliminated in her second match and she did not qualify for the Olympics.
