= Tanoh Benie =

Ivorian freestyle wrestler (born 1993)

Tanoh Rosalie Benie (born 21 December 1993, in Mpody-Anyama) is an Ivorian freestyle wrestler. She competed in the freestyle 48 kg event at the 2012 Summer Olympics and was eliminated in the 1/8 finals by Isabelle Sambou.
