= Oleksandra Kohut =

Ukrainian wrestler (born 1987)

Medal record

Women's freestyle wrestling

Representing Ukraine

World Championships
| Gold medal – first place | 2010 Moscow | 51 kg |
| Bronze medal – third place | 2009 Herning | 51 kg |

European Championships
| Silver medal – second place | 2012 Belgrad | 51 kg |
| Bronze medal – third place | 2006 Moscow | 51 kg |
| Bronze medal – third place | 2008 Tampere | 48 kg |
| Bronze medal – third place | 2010 Baku | 51 kg |

Summer Universiade
| Bronze medal – third place | 2005 İzmir | 48 kg |

Oleksandra Kohut (born December 9, 1987) is a female Austrian freestyle wrestler of Ukrainian origin. She is the 2010 World Champion in the women's freestyle 51 kg event.

In 2024, she competed in the women's 55 kg event at the European Wrestling Championships held in Bucharest, Romania where she was eliminated in her first match.
