= So Sim-hyang =

North Korean freestyle wrestler

Personal information
- Nationality: North Korea
- Born: July 1, 1992 (age 34) North Korea

Sport
- Sport: Sport wrestling
- Event: Freestyle
- Team: Amnokgang Sports Team

Korean name
- Hangul: 서심향
- RR: Seo Simhyang
- MR: Sŏ Simhyang
Medal record
Women's freestyle wrestling
FILA Wrestling World Championships
Bronze medal – third place	2013 Budapest	51 kg
Bronze medal – third place	2009 Herning	48 kg
Asian Games
Gold medal – first place	2010 Guangzhou	48 kg
Asian Wrestling Championships
Bronze medal – third place	2010 New Delhi	48 kg
Bronze medal – third place	2011 Tashkent	48 kg
Bronze medal – third place	2013 New Delhi	51 kg

So Sim-hyang (Korean: 서심향; born on 1 July 1992) is a freestyle wrestler from North Korea. She competed in 48 kg division, but in 2013 she moved to the 51 kg division. She was the gold medalist at the 2010 Asian Games and three times Asian Championships bronze medalist. She also has two world Championship bronze medals under her name. So is also considered the best female wrestler of North Korea. She represents the Amnokgang Sports Team.
