= Kim Hyung-joo =

South Korean freestyle wrestler

- Hangul: 김형주
- RR: Gim Hyeongju
- MR: Kim Hyŏngju

Kim Hyung-joo (Korean: 김형주; born 12 September 1984) is a South Korean freestyle wrestler. In the women's 48 kg freestyle wrestling event at the 2008 Summer Olympics, she reached the quarter-finals, losing to Carol Huynh. She competed in the freestyle 48 kg event at the 2012 Summer Olympics and was eliminated in the 1/8 finals by Iryna Merleni. Kim was born in North Gyeongsang Province, South Korea.
