= Zamira Rakhmanova =

Russian wrestler

Medal record

Women's freestyle wrestling

Representing Russia

World Championships
Gold medal – first place	2011 Istanbul	51 kg
Bronze medal – third place	2010 Moscow	51 kg

European Championships
Gold medal – first place	2007 Sofia	51 kg

Zamira Alimradovna Rakhmanova (Russian: Замира Алимрадовна Рахманова; born December 28, 1985, Kaspiysk, Dagestan ASSR, USSR) is a female wrestler from Russia of Lezgin ancestry. Zamira participated at the 2008 Summer Olympics.
