= Íngrid Medrano =

Salvadoran wrestler (born 1979)

Personal information
- Born: July 6, 1979 (age 47) San Salvador, El Salvador

Sport
- Sport: Freestyle wrestling
Medal record
Representing El Salvador
Pan American Games
Silver medal – second place	2007 Rio de Janeiro	48kg
Central American and Caribbean Games
Silver medal – second place	2002 San Salvador	48kg

Íngrid Xiomara Medrano Cuéllar (born July 6, 1979) is a freestyle wrestler from El Salvador. She participated in Women's freestyle 48 kg at 2008 Summer Olympics. In the eighth final she beat Erica Dobre from Romania. In the quarter final Medrano lost to Kazakh Tatyana Bakatyuk. She won a silver medal at the 2007 Pan American Games.
