= Alexandra Engelhardt =

German freestyle wrestler

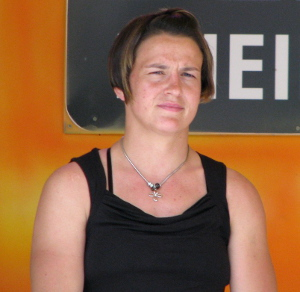
Alexandra Engelhardt in 2012

Alexandra Engelhardt (née Demmel, born 29 December 1982 in Munich) is a German freestyle wrestler. She competed in the freestyle 48 kg event at the 2012 Summer Olympics and was eliminated in the 1/8 finals by Mayelis Caripá. At the 2008 Games she was knocked out in the second round.
