= Clarissa Chun =

American freestyle wrestler (born 1981)

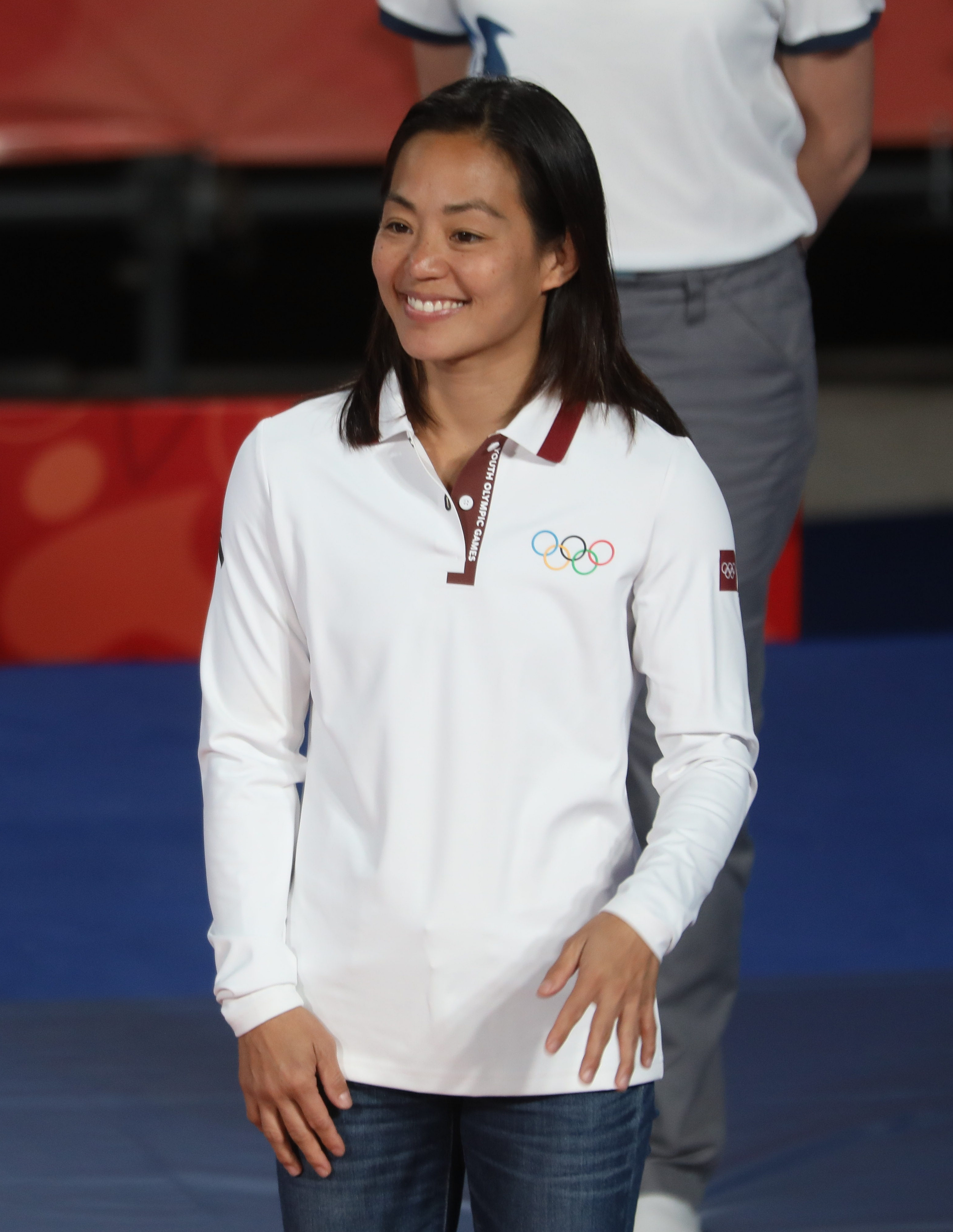

Personal information
- Born: August 27, 1981 (age 45) Honolulu, Hawaii, U.S.
- Weight: 105.5 lb (48 kg)

Sport
- Country: United States
- Sport: Wrestling
- Event: Freestyle
- College team: Missouri Valley College
- Club: Sunkist Kids Wrestling Club
- Team: USA
Medal record
Women's freestyle wrestling
Representing the United States
Olympic Games
| Bronze medal – third place | 2012 London | 48 kg |
World Championships
| Gold medal – first place | 2008 Tokyo | 48 kg |
Pan American Games
| Silver medal – second place | 2011 Guadalajara | 48 kg |
Pan American Championships
| Gold medal – first place | 2008 Colorado Springs | 48 kg |
| Gold medal – first place | 2009 Maracaibo | 48 kg |
| Gold medal – first place | 2010 Monterrey | 48 kg |
| Gold medal – first place | 2012 Kissimmee | 48 kg |
| Gold medal – first place | 2016 Frisco | 48 kg |

Clarissa Kyoko Mei Ling Chun (陳美玲) is the head coach of the Iowa Hawkeyes Women's wrestling program, formerly, the USA Wrestling assistant National coach and an American Olympic women's freestyle 48 kg (105.5 lbs) wrestler. Chun was the first female wrestler from Hawaii to win a medal at the Olympics. She was inducted into the 2018 Hawaii Sports Hall of Fame and 2022 National Wrestling Hall of Fame as a Distinguished Member.

In 2022, it marked the first time that more than one female was inducted into the National Wrestling Hall of Fame as a Distinguished Member, with Chun and Sara McMann becoming the third and fourth female Distinguished Members, joining fellow female wrestlers Tricia Saunders (2006) and Kristie Davis (2018). Chun was also among the inductees of the 2023 class of the National Federation of State High School Associations (NFHS) National High School Hall of Fame.

On November 18, 2021, Chun was announced as the first head coach of the University of Iowa's women's wrestling program.

== Biography ==
Chun was born in Honolulu, Hawaii and raised in Kapolei, Hawaii. She is Asian-American. Her mother, Gail Higashi, is Japanese-American from Līhuʻe, Kauaʻi. Her father, Bryan Chun, is Chinese-American from ʻAiea, Oʻahu.

In 2008, Chun taught English to kindergarten students in Japan. Chun had a guest starring role in Hawaii Five-0 in Season three episode twenty as a contestant.

On November 19, 2021, Chun was announced as the first ever Head Coach of the Iowa Hawkeyes Women's Wrestling Program. The program concluded its inaugural year in 2024 by going undefeated in dual meet competitions at 16–0, by winning the 2024 NWCA National Dual Team Championships in Cedar Falls Iowa, and by capturing the team title at the 2024 National Collegiate Women's Wrestling Championships in Cedar Rapids Iowa. The Hawkeyes brought home 12 All-Americans and 6 individual championships with Emilie Gonzalez (101), Ava Bayless (109), Felicity Taylor (116), Reese Laramendy (143), Marlynee Deede (155), and Kylie Welker (170) all capturing titles.

== Athletic career ==
Chun came from a judo background, winning five junior national championships before she tried wrestling in her junior year at Roosevelt High School in Honolulu, Hawaii. She captured the state wrestling title in 1998, the first year girls wrestling was a sanctioned sport.

Chun attended Missouri Valley College in Marshall, Missouri and earned a communications degree from the University of Colorado Colorado Springs.

Chun was one of the charter members of the Valley program when it began in 1999, and was one of its most decorated. She placed second in the U.S. World Team Trials and medaled in both the U.S. Nationals and Pan American Games during all three of her seasons in Marshall—along with winning several college-level competitions.

Prior to her senior campaign, Chun accepted an invitation to attend the U.S. Olympic Training Center in Colorado Springs, eventually earning her degree from the University of Colorado branch there. After placing second in the U.S. Olympic Trials in 2004, the first year women's wrestling competition was held at the Games, she made the squad four years later.

At the 2008 U.S. Olympic wrestling team trials in June, Chun gained the admiration of fans and media alike by staging a huge upset of seven-time national champion and 2004 Olympic bronze medalist Patricia Miranda. In the process, Chun, who stands 4 feet 11 inches (1.50 m), fulfilled a lifelong dream, becoming the first wrestler from Hawai'i to qualify for a U.S. Olympic team.

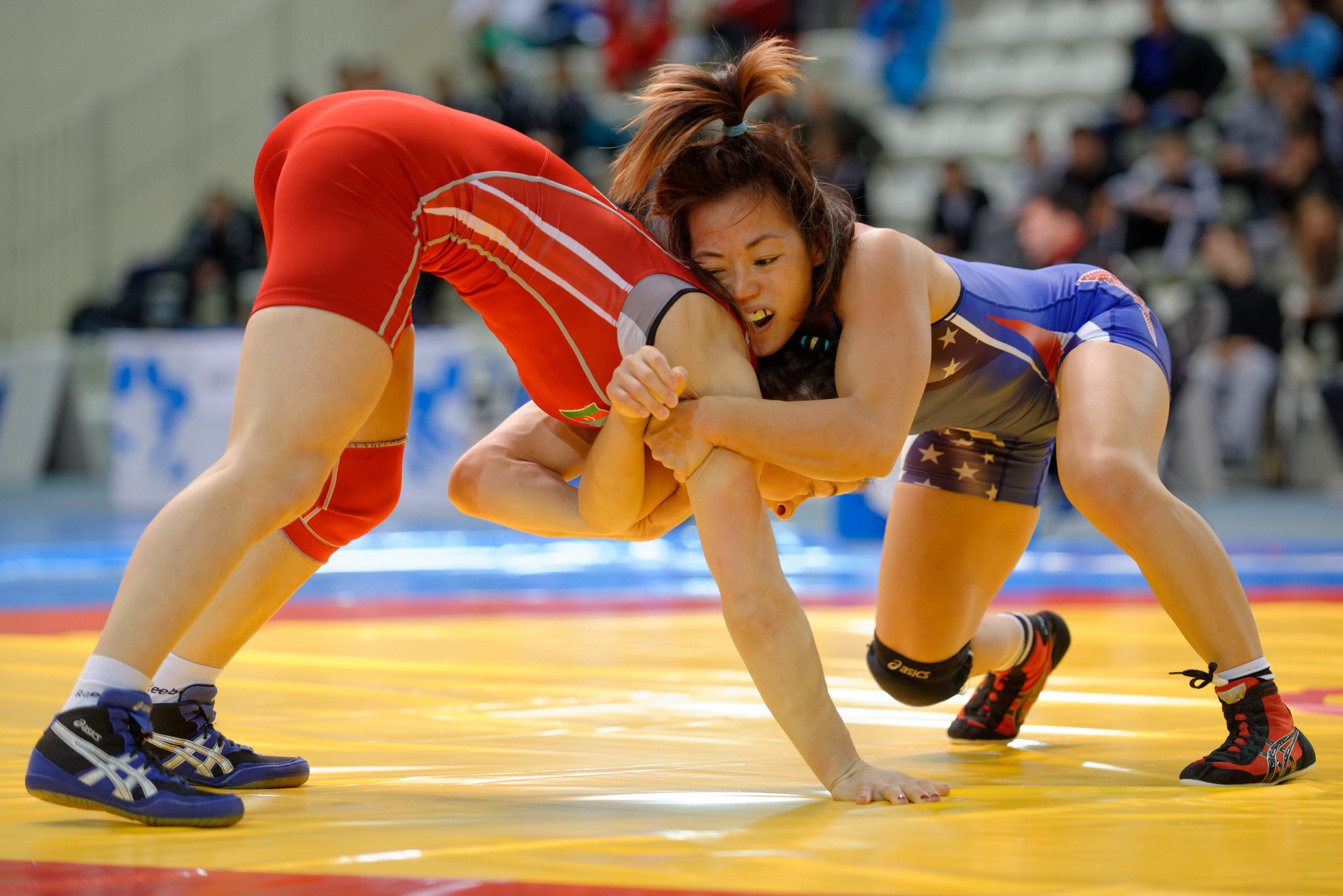
Chun (blue) wrestles Mariya Stadnik at the 2014 Paris Grand Prix

Wrestling at the 2008 Summer Olympics – Women's freestyle 48 kg, after winning the first two matches, Chun fell to world champion Chiharu Icho of Japan in the semifinals in an overtime tiebreaker (last to score). She lost in the bronze-medal match to 2004 gold medalist Irini Merleni of Ukraine, and made her mark at the international level by finishing fifth.

Two months after the 2008 Olympic Games, Chun turned in a superb effort to capture a gold medal at the World 2008 Championships in Tokyo, Japan. She relied on her defense in pulling out a gritty 1–0, 1–0 finals win over Kazakhstan's Jyldyz Eshimova-Turtbayeva at the Yoyogi National Stadium.

Chun's successful seasons included winning the U.S. Senior National titles, and international titles from the Canada Cup, New York AC Freestyle International, Poland Open, Mongolia Championships, Russia International and Pan American Games. Chun also represented the U.S. at the FILA Women's World Cup in China in 2009 and Japan in 2012.

Chun became the first women's freestyle wrestler to be nominated to her second Olympic Team after her stellar performance at the 2012 U.S. Olympic Team Trials for Wrestling in Iowa City, Iowa, on April 22, 2012.

Wrestling at the 2012 Summer Olympics – Women's freestyle 48 kg, Chun qualified for the bronze-medal match by launching World bronze medalist Iwona Matkowska of Poland to her back and recording a dramatic second-period fall in the repechage. Chun knocked off 2004 Olympic gold medalist Iryna Merleni of Ukraine 1–0, 3–0 to capture a bronze medal in women's freestyle wrestling at the 2012 London Olympics. Chun twice wrestled in the bronze medal match at the Olympics, winning her medal in London and taking fifth in Beijing. She was a five-time world team member, winning the world title in 2008.

Chun is currently an assistant coach for USA Wrestling's women's national team. On May 15, 2018, she was inducted into the Hawaii Sports Hall of Fame.

USA Wrestling National Women's Freestyle Assistant Coach Clarissa Chun has been invited as a United World Wrestling Ambassador to be a part of a program, reaching out to Syrian Refugees in Azraq, Jordan, on July 19.

The initiative, called Inspire Together for Peace, is a joint effort with UWW and World Taekwondo/Taekwondo Humanitarian Foundation. WT/THF already has an existing presence there with a facility and program to help get other sports established.

The goal of this initiative is to introduce these combat sports to the community.

On November 18, 2021, Chun was chosen as the inaugural coach for the women's wrestling program at the University of Iowa, the first women's wrestling program among Power 5 schools. As of 4/19/22, Iowa and Chun have attracted an array of the top recruits in the country to commit to the Hawkeyes; including four #1 prospects in their respective weight divisions.

Team USA had three gold, two silver and four bronze at the Tokyo 2021 Olympics. It is the most medals won by the US in a non-boycotted Olympics, and is only surpassed by the 1984 Los Angeles team which won 13 medals. The USA had all five of its men's freestyle entries win a medal, as well as a record four women's freestyle medalists.

== International award winning wrestler ==
- 2016: U.S. Olympic Team Trials champion – Third place – women's freestyle wrestling
- 2016: Gold Medal – Pan Am Games women's freestyle, FRISCO, Texas.
- 2016: 2nd place – Dave Schultz Memorial International tournament, Colorado Springs, Colorado
- 2015: Gold Medal – Open Cup of Russia, CHEBOKSARY, Russia
- 2015: 3rd place – Henri Deglane Challenge, Nice, France
- 2015: 3rd place – U.S. World Team Trials in Madison, Wisconsin
- 2015: 3rd place – 2015 Las Vegas/ASICS U.S. Senior Open. May 8–9 at Las Vegas, Nevada.
- 2015: 2nd place – Dave Schultz Memorial International tournament, Colorado Springs, Colorado
- 2014: 3rd place – U.S. World Team Trials in Madison, Wisconsin
- 2014: 3rd place – in U.S. Nationals Open
- 2014: Bronze Medal – Grand Prix of Paris, France.
- 2012: 9th Place – Women's Freestyle World Championships, SHERWOOD PARK, Canada
- 2012: Bronze medal – The Games of the XXX Olympiad (London, England, Great Briton, United Kingdom)
- 2012: 5th Place – Canada Cup, Guelph, Canada
- 2012: Women's World Cup in Tokyo, Japan
- 2012: U.S. Olympic Team Trials champion – First place – women's freestyle wrestling
- 2012: Gold Medal – FILA Pan American Qualifier women's freestyle, KISSIMMEE, Florida.
- 2011: 5th Place: Mongolia Open, ULAN BAATAR, Mongolia.
- 2011: Gold Medal: U.S. Open Wrestling Championships in Arlington, Texas.
- 2011: 2nd Place: New York AC Freestyle International.
- 2011: Silver Medal – Pan Am Games women's freestyle, GUADALAJARA, Mexico
- 2011: 7th Place – Women's Freestyle World Championships, ISTANBUL, Turkey
- 2011: 1st place – Gold Medal – Poland Open, Poznan, Poland
- 2011: 1st place – U.S. World Team Trials in Oklahoma City
- 2011: Bronze: Mongolian National Wrestling Championship
- 2011: Gold Medal: ASICS U.S. Open Wrestling Championships in Cleveland, Ohio.
- 2011: Silver Medal: Grand Prix of Tourcoing, Tourcoing, France.
- 2010: Gold Medal: Open Cup in Russia International.
- 2010: 1st Place: New York AC Freestyle International.
- 2010: Bronze Medal: German Grand Prix.
- 2010: 2nd place – in U.S. World Team Trials
- 2010: Gold Medal: Pan American Wrestling Championships in MONTERREY, Mexico.
- 2009:Women's World Cup in Taiyuan, China
- 2009: Gold Medal: Canada Cup, Guelph, Canada
- 2009: Women's Freestyle World Championships – Herning, Denmark
- 2009: 1st place – in U.S. World Team Trials
- 2009: Gold Medal: Pan American Wrestling Championships in Maracaibo, Venezuela.
- 2009: 1st place – in U.S. Nationals
- 2008: Women's Freestyle World Championships – First place – Gold Medal – 48 kg
- 2008: 1st place – in U.S. World Team Trials
- 2008: 5th place – Olympics – Beijing, China
- 2008: U.S. Olympic Team Trials champion – First place – women's freestyle wrestling

105.5-pound division at the U.S. Olympic Team Trials for Wrestling and Judo – Beijing, China.

- 2008: Fourth in U.S. Nationals
- 2008: Gold Medal: Pan American Wrestling Championships in Colorado Springs, Colo.
- 2008: Silver Medal: Guelph Open, Guelph, Canada
- 2007: Fourth in U.S. World Team Trials
- 2007: Third in U.S. Nationals
- 2007: Third in Guelph Open (Canada)
- 2006: U.S. Senior Nationals – Gold Medal
- 2006: Second in New York AC Holiday International Open
- 2006: Sunkist Kids/ASU International Open champion
- 2006: U.S. Nationals champion
- 2006: Vehbi Emre Golden Grand Prix champion (Turkey)
- 2006: Tenth in Ivan Yarygin Memorial International (Russia)
- 2006: Second in Klippan Ladies Golden Grand Prix (Sweden)
- 2005: Sunkist Kids/ASU International champion – 1st Place 2005 Sunkist Kids / ASU International Open
- 2005: Second in NYAC Holiday Championships
- 2005: Clansmen International champion (Canada)
- 2005: Third in U.S. World Team Trials
- 2004: Second in Sunkist Kids International Open
- 2004: Fourth in World Cup
- 2004: Second at the U.S. Olympic Trials in women's wrestling (the first year with the style in the Olympics) (48 kg)
- 2004: Second in U.S. Nationals
- 2004: Sixth in Ivan Yarygin Memorial International (Russia)
- 2004: Fourth in Dave Schultz Memorial International

USA Wrestling's Women's University National Champion

Consistently ranked No. 2 by USA Wrestling

- 2003: Second in Sunkist Kids International Open
- 2003: Second in U.S. World Team Trials
- 2003: Second in U.S. Nationals
- 2003: Fourth in Klippan Ladies Open (Sweden)
- April 14, 2003: USA Wrestling's Women's University National Champion in St. Joseph, Minn.
- 2002: Second in U.S. World Team Trials – Runner-up
- 2002: Fourth in U.S. Nationals
- 2002: Third in Pan American Championships
- 2002: was among the charter group of about 20 women invited to the U.S. Olympic Training Center when its women's wrestling facility opened.
- 2001: Sunkist Kids International Open champion
- 2001: Fourth in World Cup
- 2001: Second in U.S. World Team Trials – Runner-up
- 2001: Third in U.S. Nationals
- 2001: Klippan Ladies Open champion (Sweden)
- 2001: Second in Pan American Championships
- 2001: Missouri Valley International Open champion
- 2001: Second in Minnesota – Morris Women's Open
- 2001: Third in Manitoba Open (Canada)
- 2001: Represented USA in first Women's World Cup 2001 in Levalois, France
- 2001: Won international open in Phoenix
- 2001: USA Wrestling's Women's University National Champion
- 2001: Fifth in Junior World Championships
- 2000: DNP in World Championships
- 2000: Second in Pan American Championships
- 2000: Second in U.S. World Team Trials
- 2000: Second in U.S. Nationals
- 2000: Dave Schultz Memorial International champion
- 2000: Minnesota-Morris Women's Open champion
- 2000–02: Silver medal at Pan American Championships
- 2000–01: FILA Junior Nationals champion
- 2000: Third in University Nationals
- 2000: U.S. World Team member
- 2000: U.S. Collegiate Nationals champion
- 2000: Eighth in Junior World Championships
- 1999: Third in Sunkist Kids International Open
- 1999: Third in Sunkist Kids International Open
- 1999: USA Age-Group: Fourth in 2004 University World Championships
- 1999: Hawaii State champion wrestler

Wrestling USA Magazine's High School Girls All-America Team

- 1999 USGWA High School Nationals – Third
- 1998: Hawaii State champion wrestler – the first year girls wrestling was a sanctioned sport.

CAREER NOTES: (themat.com)

== Honors ==
Chun was inducted as a Distinguished Member of the National Wrestling Hall of Fame in 2022.
