= Carol Huynh =

Canadian freestyle wrestler (b. 1980)

Carol Huynh OLY
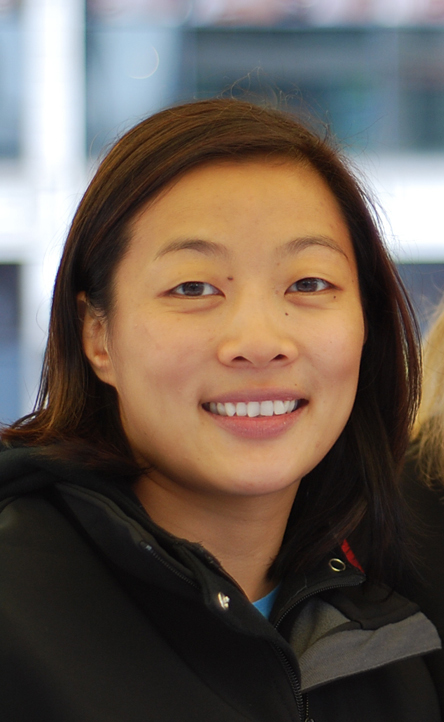
- Huynh in 2009

Personal information
- Born: 16 November 1980 (age 45) Hazelton, British Columbia, Canada
- Height: 154 cm (5 ft 1 in)
- Weight: 52 kg (115 lb)

Sport
- Sport: Wrestling
- Event: Freestyle
- Club: Dinos Wrestling Club
Medal record
Women's freestyle wrestling
Representing Canada
Olympic Games
Gold medal – first place	2008 Beijing	48 kg
Bronze medal – third place	2012 London	48 kg
World Championships
Silver medal – second place	2001 Sofia	46 kg
Bronze medal – third place	2000 Sofia	46 kg
Bronze medal – third place	2005 Budapest	48 kg
Bronze medal – third place	2010 Moscow	48 kg
Commonwealth Games
Gold medal – first place	2010 Delhi	48 kg
Pan American Games
Gold medal – first place	2007 Rio de Janeiro	48 kg
Gold medal – first place	2011 Guadalajara	48 kg

Carol Huynh (/ˈwɪn/; born 16 November 1980) is a retired Canadian freestyle wrestler. Huynh was the first gold medalist for Canada in women's wrestling and the first gold medallist for the country at the 2008 Beijing Olympics. She is also the 2010 Commonwealth Games and two-time Pan American Games champion. She has also achieved success at the world championships where Huynh has totaled one silver and three bronze medals. Huynh is also an eleven time national champion. Following the 2012 Olympics, Huynh retired from competition and started coaching the University of Calgary Dinos wrestling team. Huynh was elected to the United World Wrestling Hall of Fame in 2013. In early 2015 she was selected as a United World Wrestling Super 8 Ambassador for the global campaign focusing on the development of women in wrestling and has also served as the Chair of the United World Wrestling Athletes Commission from 2013 to 2017. As of 2020 she is the current coach of Wrestling Canada's Next Gen team based in Calgary.

== Career ==
Huynh broke onto the international scene as a wrestler beginning at the World Championships in 2000 where she won bronze. She continued to build on this success at the next World Championships in 2001 where she won silver. She would have to wait four more years till she would medal again at the Worlds when she won a bronze again in 2005. Success never dropped off though, Huynh would win the title in her 48 kg weight class at the 2007 Pan American Games.

She competed in the 48 kg weight class at the 2008 Summer Olympics, winning a gold medal. This broke Canada's gold medal drought at the 2008 Games. She is the second ever female medallist for Canada in Olympic wrestling, after Tonya Verbeek, the 2004 Athens freestyle silver medallist. Huynh was the first gold medallist in women's wrestling for Canada.

Following the Olympic games she continued to perform at a top level, winning bronze at the 2010 World Championships. That same year she won the Commonwealth Games title. Huynh then won the 2011 Canadian title again for 48 kg and then successfully defended her Pan Am Games title in Guadalajara. She was named to the 2012 Summer Olympics team in London for Canada. There she won a second Olympic medal, this time a bronze in the 48 kg class.

=== Coaching and leadership ===
In 2013, after retiring from competitive wrestling and being inducted to the FILA (renamed in 2014 as United World Wrestling) Hall of Fame, she was appointed as a chairwoman to the international wrestling federation. On 8 December 2015, Huynh was named Canada's assistant chef de mission for Rio Olympics. She was awarded the Order of Sport, marking her induction into Canada's Sports Hall of Fame in 2017. Since 2015 and as of December 2020, Huynh has served as Wrestling Canada's Next Gen coach based out of Calgary.

== Personal ==
Huynh was born in British Columbia to parents who were ethnic Chinese refugees from northern Vietnam. Her father was born in China, but moved to Vietnam when he was three; her mother was born in Vietnam. They settled in the town of New Hazelton, British Columbia, after being sponsored by the local United Church. Coming from a wrestling family, where both of her sisters wrestled, she started wrestling at 15. She started studies at Simon Fraser University in 1998, then moved to the University of Calgary in 2007. Huynh married Dan Biggs, a social worker and former wrestler, in 2005. She was coached by Paul Ragusa, former National team member and Olympian, as well as Leigh Vierling, ex-husband of former World Champion Christine Nordhagen.

== Competitive record ==
Competition	Event	Result	Notes
1999 Junior Worlds	46 kg (female)	7th	
2000 Junior Worlds	46 kg (female)	9th	
2000 FILA Senior World Championships	46 kg Freestyle (female)	Bronze	
2001 FILA Senior World Championships	46 kg Freestyle (female)	Silver	
2002 FILA Senior World Championships	44 kg Freestyle (female)	5th	
2002 NAIA	48 kg women	Champion	Carol Huynh was also the tournament MVP, and came out of it ranked #1 in CIS and NAIA rankings.
2002 Canadian senior wrestling championships		Champion	
2003 World Cup	44 kg	Bronze	
2003 Canadian senior wrestling championships		Champion	
2004 Canadian Olympic trials		2nd	Carol Huynh was an alternate for the wrestling contingent at the 2004 Olympics. She had finished second to Lyndsay Belisle. At the time, she was ranked #1 at 48 kg in NAIA and CIS rankings.
World Cup 2004	48 kg Freestyle (female)	Bronze	
2005 Summer Universiade		Gold	(University World Championships)
2005 FILA Senior World Championships	48 kg Freestyle (female)	Bronze	
2005 Canadian senior wrestling championships	48 kg women	Champion	
2006 Kiev International		1st	
2006 Golden Grand Prix		1st	
2006 Canada Cup		2nd	
2006 World Cup	48 kg Freestyle (female)	Silver	
2006 FILA Senior World Championships		5th	
2006 CIS		Champion	
2006 Canadian senior wrestling championships	48 kg women	Champion	
2007 Pan Am	48 kg Freestyle (female)	Gold	
2007 FILA Senior World Championships	48 kg Freestyle (female)	5th	Carol Huynh lost the bronze medal match 3–4, 4–1, 1–1 to Mayelis Caripa-Castillo
2008 Canadian Olympic trials	48 kg Freestyle (female)	1st	Carol Huynh wins a spot on the Olympic team against Erica Sharp
2008 Canada Cup		withdrew	The Canadian women's Olympic wrestling team were slated to compete, but withdrew to rest up for the Olympics. The Canada Cup is a mandatory event in non-Olympic years.
2008 Summer Olympics	48 kg Freestyle (female)	Gold	First Canadian to win a gold medal at the 2008 Summer Olympics.
2010 Commonwealth games	48 kg Freestyle (female)	Gold	
2011 Pan Am	48 kg Freestyle (female)	Gold	
2012 Summer Olympics	48 kg Freestyle (female)	Bronze	

== See also ==
- Wrestling in Canada
- Canadian Interuniversity Sport
- National Association of Intercollegiate Athletics

Olympic Games
Preceded by Irini Merleni (UKR)	Olympic Champion; Wrestling; 48kg Freestyle – Women; 2008	Succeeded by Hitomi Obara (JPN)
Preceded by	2008 Olympic medallist 48 kg Freestyle Wrestling; Women; GOLD	Succeeded by Chiharu Icho (JPN); Silver
