= 1999 World Wrestling Championships – Men's freestyle 130 kg =

Men's freestyle 130 kg at the 1999 World Championships
- Venue: Atatürk Sport Hall
- Dates: 8–10 October 1999
- Competitors: 24 from 24 nations

Medalists
gold medal	Stephen Neal	United States
silver medal	Andrey Shumilin	Russia
bronze medal	Abbas Jadidi	Iran

The men's freestyle 130 kilograms is a competition featured at the 1999 World Wrestling Championships, and was held at the Atatürk Sport Hall in Ankara, Turkey from 8 to 10 October 1999.

== Results ==
=== Preliminary round ===
==== Pool 1 ====
Pos	Athlete	Pld	W	L	CP	TP	RUS	CUB	BLR
1	Andrey Shumilin (RUS)	2	2	0	6	6	—	4–0	2–0
2	Alexis Rodríguez (CUB)	2	1	1	3	4	0–3 PO	—	4–0
3	Aleksey Medvedev (BLR)	2	0	2	0	0	0–3 PO	0–3 PO	—

Source: Official website

==== Pool 2 ====
Pos	Athlete	Pld	W	L	CP	TP	UKR	BUL	JPN
1	Mirabi Valiyev (UKR)	2	2	0	6	8	—	5–3	3–0
2	Bozhidar Boyadzhiev (BUL)	2	1	1	4	8	1–3 PP	—	5–1
3	Hiroyuki Obata (JPN)	2	0	2	1	1	0–3 PO	1–3 PP	—

Source: Official website

==== Pool 3 ====
Pos	Athlete	Pld	W	L	CP	TP	IRI	POL	KOR
1	Abbas Jadidi (IRI)	2	2	0	6	10	—	3–0	7–0
2	Tomasz Szewczyk (POL)	2	1	1	4	4	0–3 PO	—	4–0 Fall
3	Shin Jung-hoon (KOR)	2	0	2	0	0	0–3 PO	0–4 TO	—

Source: Official website

==== Pool 4 ====
Pos	Athlete	Pld	W	L	CP	TP	KGZ	HUN	MGL
1	Aleksandr Kovalevsky (KGZ)	2	2	0	6	9	—	3–1	6–0
2	Zsolt Gombos (HUN)	2	1	1	5	1	1–3 PP	—	WO
3	Gelegjamtsyn Ösökhbayar (MGL)	2	0	2	0	0	0–3 PO	0–4 PA	—

Source: Official website

==== Pool 5 ====
Pos	Athlete	Pld	W	L	CP	TP	GER	UZB	GBR
1	Sven Thiele (GER)	2	2	0	7	14	—	3–0	11–0
2	Georgy Kaysinov (UZB)	2	1	1	3	4	0–3 PO	—	4–0
3	Amarjit Singh (GBR)	2	0	2	0	0	0–4 ST	0–3 PO	—

Source: Official website

==== Pool 6 ====
Pos	Athlete	Pld	W	L	CP	TP	AZE	SVK	AUS
1	Rajab Ashabaliyev (AZE)	2	2	0	7	14	—	4–0	10–0
2	Peter Pecha (SVK)	2	1	1	4	4	0–3 PO	—	4–0 Fall
3	Mushtaq Abdullah (AUS)	2	0	2	0	0	0–4 ST	0–4 TO	—

Source: Official website

==== Pool 7 ====
Pos	Athlete	Pld	W	L	CP	TP	USA	GRE	RSA
1	Stephen Neal (USA)	2	2	0	8	15	—	12–2	3–0 Fall
2	Anastasios Symeonidis (GRE)	2	1	1	4	10	1–4 SP	—	8–5
3	Frans van den Heever (RSA)	2	0	2	1	5	0–4 TO	1–3 PP	—

Source: Official website

==== Pool 8 ====
Pos	Athlete	Pld	W	L	CP	TP	TUR	CHN	GEO
1	Aydın Polatçı (TUR)	2	2	0	6	5	—	3–0	2–0
2	Chen Xingqiang (CHN)	2	1	1	3	5	0–3 PO	—	5–4
3	Alex Modebadze (GEO)	2	0	2	1	4	0–3 PO	1–3 PP	—

Source: Official website

=== Knockout round ===
Quarterfinals
Andrey Shumilin (RUS)	2
Mirabi Valiyev (UKR)	0
Abbas Jadidi (IRI)	3
Aleksandr Kovalevsky (KGZ)	0
Sven Thiele (GER)	3
Rajab Ashabaliyev (AZE)	7
Stephen Neal (USA)	10
Aydın Polatçı (TUR)	6

Semifinals
Andrey Shumilin (RUS)	1
Abbas Jadidi (IRI)	1
Rajab Ashabaliyev (AZE)	2
Stephen Neal (USA)	8

Final
Andrey Shumilin (RUS)	3
Stephen Neal (USA)	4
Bronze medal match
Abbas Jadidi (IRI)	3
Rajab Ashabaliyev (AZE)	1
