= Wrestling at the 1996 Summer Olympics – Men's freestyle 130 kg =

Men's freestyle 130 kg at the Games of the XXVI Olympiad
- Venue: Georgia World Congress Center
- Dates: 1–2 August 1996
- Competitors: 18 from 18 nations

Medalists
1st place, gold medalist(s)		Mahmut Demir	Turkey
2nd place, silver medalist(s)		Aleksey Medvedev	Belarus
3rd place, bronze medalist(s)		Bruce Baumgartner	United States

The men's freestyle 130 kilograms at the 1996 Summer Olympics as part of the wrestling program were held at the Georgia World Congress Center on August 1 and 2. The gold and silver medalists were determined by the final match of the main single-elimination bracket. The losers advanced to the repechage. These matches determined the bronze medalist for the event.

== Results ==
=== Round 1 ===
	Score		CP
1/16 finals
Amarjit Singh (GBR)	2–6	Ebrahim Mehraban (IRI)	1–3 PP
Zsolt Gombos (HUN)	7–0	Neal Kranz (GUM)	3–0 PO
Bruce Baumgartner (USA)	10–0	Andy Borodow (CAN)	4–0 ST
Igor Klimov (KAZ)	1–4	Andrey Shumilin (RUS)	1–3 PP
Zaza Turmanidze (GEO)	8–0 Fall	Mick Pikos (AUS)	4–0 TO
Aleksey Medvedev (BLR)	7–1	Petros Bourdoulis (GRE)	3–1 PP
Alfredo Far (PAN)	0–11	Feng Aigang (CHN)	0–4 ST
Sven Thiele (GER)	1–0	Aleksandr Kovalevsky (KGZ)	3–0 PO
Mirabi Valiyev (UKR)	1–1	Mahmut Demir (TUR)	1–3 PP

=== Round 2 ===
	Score		CP
1/8 finals
Ebrahim Mehraban (IRI)	0–3	Zsolt Gombos (HUN)	0–3 PO
Bruce Baumgartner (USA)	1–6	Andrey Shumilin (RUS)	1–3 PP
Zaza Turmanidze (GEO)	1–3	Aleksey Medvedev (BLR)	1–3 PP
Feng Aigang (CHN)	1–1	Sven Thiele (GER)	1–3 PP
Mahmut Demir (TUR)		Bye	
Repechage
Amarjit Singh (GBR)	3–0	Neal Kranz (GUM)	3–0 PO
Andy Borodow (CAN)	5–3	Igor Klimov (KAZ)	3–1 PP
Mick Pikos (AUS)	0–6 Fall	Petros Bourdoulis (GRE)	0–4 TO
Alfredo Far (PAN)	0–4 Fall	Aleksandr Kovalevsky (KGZ)	0–4 TO
Mirabi Valiyev (UKR)		Bye	

=== Round 3 ===
	Score		CP
Quarterfinals
Mahmut Demir (TUR)	4–0	Zsolt Gombos (HUN)	3–0 PO
Andrey Shumilin (RUS)		Bye	
Aleksey Medvedev (BLR)		Bye	
Sven Thiele (GER)		Bye	
Repechage
Mirabi Valiyev (UKR)	4–0	Amarjit Singh (GBR)	3–0 PO
Andy Borodow (CAN)	0–1	Petros Bourdoulis (GRE)	0–3 PO
Aleksandr Kovalevsky (KGZ)	3–2	Ebrahim Mehraban (IRI)	3–1 PP
Bruce Baumgartner (USA)	14–2	Zaza Turmanidze (GEO)	4–1 SP
Feng Aigang (CHN)		Bye	

=== Round 4 ===
	Score		CP
Semifinals
Mahmut Demir (TUR)	1–0	Andrey Shumilin (RUS)	3–0 PO
Aleksey Medvedev (BLR)	0–0	Sven Thiele (GER)	3–0 PO
Repechage
Feng Aigang (CHN)	1–3	Mirabi Valiyev (UKR)	1–3 PP
Petros Bourdoulis (GRE)	1–7	Aleksandr Kovalevsky (KGZ)	1–3 PP
Bruce Baumgartner (USA)	11–0	Zsolt Gombos (HUN)	4–0 ST

=== Round 5 ===
	Score		CP
Repechage
Mirabi Valiyev (UKR)	1–3	Aleksandr Kovalevsky (KGZ)	1–3 PP
Bruce Baumgartner (USA)		Bye	

=== Round 6 ===
	Score		CP
Repechage
Andrey Shumilin (RUS)	3–0 Fall	Aleksandr Kovalevsky (KGZ)	4–0 TO
Bruce Baumgartner (USA)	3–0	Sven Thiele (GER)	3–0 PO

=== Finals ===
	Score		CP
Classification 7th–8th
Mirabi Valiyev (UKR)	5–1	Petros Bourdoulis (GRE)	3–1 PP
Classification 5th–6th
Aleksandr Kovalevsky (KGZ)	3–1	Sven Thiele (GER)	3–1 PP
Bronze medal match
Andrey Shumilin (RUS)	1–1	Bruce Baumgartner (USA)	1–3 PP
Gold medal match
Mahmut Demir (TUR)	3–0	Aleksey Medvedev (BLR)	3–0 PO

== Final standing ==
Rank	Athlete
1st place, gold medalist(s)	Mahmut Demir (TUR)
2nd place, silver medalist(s)	Aleksey Medvedev (BLR)
3rd place, bronze medalist(s)	Bruce Baumgartner (USA)
4	Andrey Shumilin (RUS)
5	Aleksandr Kovalevsky (KGZ)
6	Sven Thiele (GER)
7	Mirabi Valiyev (UKR)
8	Petros Bourdoulis (GRE)
9	Feng Aigang (CHN)
10	Zaza Turmanidze (GEO)
11	Zsolt Gombos (HUN)
12	Ebrahim Mehraban (IRI)
13	Amarjit Singh (GBR)
14	Andy Borodow (CAN)
15	Igor Klimov (KAZ)
16	Mick Pikos (AUS)
16	Neal Kranz (GUM)
16	Alfredo Far (PAN)
