= 1998 World Wrestling Championships – Men's freestyle 130 kg =

Men's freestyle 130 kg at the 1998 World Championships
- Venue: Azadi Indoor Stadium
- Dates: 9–11 September 1998
- Competitors: 20 from 20 nations

Medalists
| gold medal | Alexis Rodríguez | Cuba |
| silver medal | Rasoul Khadem | Iran |
| bronze medal | Andrey Shumilin | Russia |

The men's freestyle 130 kilograms is a competition featured at the 1998 World Wrestling Championships, and was held at the Azadi Indoor Stadium in Tehran, Iran from 9 to 11 September 1998.

== Results ==
=== Round 1 ===
| | Score | |
Round of 32
| Jagdish Singh (IND) | 0–7 | Mushtaq Abdullah (AUS) |
| Yuri Chobitko (UKR) | 10–0 | Andrew Davidson (RSA) |
| Alex Modebadze (GEO) | 3–0 | Georgy Kaysinov (UZB) |
| Tomasz Szewczyk (POL) | 0–5 | Rasoul Khadem (IRI) |
| Aleksey Medvedev (BLR) | 5–0 Fall | Kim Tae-ho (KOR) |
| Gelegjamtsyn Ösökhbayar (MGL) | 3–0 | Oleg Ladik (CAN) |
| Feng Aigang (CHN) | 0–4 | Alexis Rodríguez (CUB) |
| Aleksandar Enev (BUL) | 2–3 | Hiroyuki Obata (JPN) |
| Andrey Shumilin (RUS) | 1–0 | Aydın Polatçı (TUR) |
| Sven Thiele (GER) | 0–2 | Kerry McCoy (USA) |

=== Round 2 ===
| | Score | |
Round of 16
| Mushtaq Abdullah (AUS) | 0–7 | Yuri Chobitko (UKR) |
| Alex Modebadze (GEO) | 0–9 | Rasoul Khadem (IRI) |
| Aleksey Medvedev (BLR) | 2–0 | Gelegjamtsyn Ösökhbayar (MGL) |
| Alexis Rodríguez (CUB) | 4–0 | Hiroyuki Obata (JPN) |
| Andrey Shumilin (RUS) | 1–1 | Kerry McCoy (USA) |
Repechage
| Jagdish Singh (IND) | 8–0 Fall | Andrew Davidson (RSA) |
| Georgy Kaysinov (UZB) | 1–1 | Tomasz Szewczyk (POL) |
| Kim Tae-ho (KOR) | 0–3 Fall | Feng Aigang (CHN) |
| Aleksandar Enev (BUL) | 0–10 | Aydın Polatçı (TUR) |
| Sven Thiele (GER) | | Bye |

=== Round 3 ===
| | Score | |
Quarterfinals
| Yuri Chobitko (UKR) | 0–4 | Rasoul Khadem (IRI) |
| Aleksey Medvedev (BLR) | | Bye |
| Alexis Rodríguez (CUB) | | Bye |
| Kerry McCoy (USA) | | Bye |
Repechage
| Sven Thiele (GER) | 5–0 Fall | Jagdish Singh (IND) |
| Georgy Kaysinov (UZB) | 5–6 | Feng Aigang (CHN) |
| Aydın Polatçı (TUR) | 10–0 | Mushtaq Abdullah (AUS) |
| Alex Modebadze (GEO) | 4–0 | Gelegjamtsyn Ösökhbayar (MGL) |
| Hiroyuki Obata (JPN) | 0–8 Fall | Andrey Shumilin (RUS) |

=== Round 4 ===
| | Score | |
Semifinals
| Rasoul Khadem (IRI) | 3–0 | Aleksey Medvedev (BLR) |
| Alexis Rodríguez (CUB) | 4–1 | Kerry McCoy (USA) |
Repechage
| Sven Thiele (GER) | 3–1 | Feng Aigang (CHN) |
| Aydın Polatçı (TUR) | 3–0 | Alex Modebadze (GEO) |
| Andrey Shumilin (RUS) | 8–4 | Yuri Chobitko (UKR) |

=== Round 5 ===
| | Score | |
Repechage
| Sven Thiele (GER) | 1–4 | Aydın Polatçı (TUR) |
| Andrey Shumilin (RUS) | | Bye |

=== Round 6 ===
| | Score | |
Repechage
| Aleksey Medvedev (BLR) | 1–3 | Andrey Shumilin (RUS) |
| Aydın Polatçı (TUR) | 2–3 | Kerry McCoy (USA) |

=== Finals ===
| | Score | |
Bronze medal match
| Andrey Shumilin (RUS) | 3–0 | Kerry McCoy (USA) |
Final
| Rasoul Khadem (IRI) | 0–6 | Alexis Rodríguez (CUB) |
