= Wrestling at the 2000 Summer Olympics – Men's freestyle 130 kg =

Men's freestyle 130 kg at the Games of the XXVII Olympiad
- Venue: Sydney Convention and Exhibition Centre
- Date: 29 September – 1 October 2000
- Competitors: 18 from 18 nations

Medalists
1st place, gold medalist(s)		David Musulbes	Russia
2nd place, silver medalist(s)		Artur Taymazov	Uzbekistan
3rd place, bronze medalist(s)		Alexis Rodríguez	Cuba

The men's freestyle 130 kilograms at the 2000 Summer Olympics as part of the wrestling program was held at the Sydney Convention and Exhibition Centre from September 29 to October 1. The competition held with an elimination system of three or four wrestlers in each pool, with the winners qualify for the quarterfinals, semifinals and final by way of direct elimination.

== Schedule ==
All times are Australian Eastern Daylight Time (UTC+11:00)

Date	Time	Event
29 September 2000	09:30	Round 1
29 September 2000	17:00	Round 2
30 September 2000	09:30	Round 3
1 October 2000	09:00	Quarterfinals
1 October 2000	09:00	Semifinals
1 October 2000	14:30	Finals

== Results ==
Legend

- F — Won by fall
- WO — Won by walkover

=== Elimination pools ===
==== Pool 1 ====
Pos	Athlete	Pld	W	L	CP	TP	Qualification
1	Alexis Rodríguez (CUB)	2	2	0	6	3	Knockout round
2	Krasimir Kochev (BUL)	2	1	1	3	1	
3	Dolgorsürengiin Sumiyaabazar (MGL)	2	0	2	2	2	

Source: Official Report

	Score		CP
Alexis Rodríguez (CUB)	2–0	Krasimir Kochev (BUL)	3–0 PO
Dolgorsürengiin Sumiyaabazar (MGL)	1–1	Alexis Rodríguez (CUB)	1–3 PP
Krasimir Kochev (BUL)	1–1	Dolgorsürengiin Sumiyaabazar (MGL)	3–1 PP

==== Pool 2 ====
Pos	Athlete	Pld	W	L	CP	TP	Qualification
1	Aleksey Medvedev (BLR)	2	2	0	6	6	Knockout round
2	Aleksandr Kovalevsky (KGZ)	2	1	1	4	6	
3	Chen Xingqiang (CHN)	2	0	2	1	2	

Source: Official Report

	Score		CP
Aleksandr Kovalevsky (KGZ)	2–3	Aleksey Medvedev (BLR)	1–3 PP
Chen Xingqiang (CHN)	2–4	Aleksandr Kovalevsky (KGZ)	1–3 PP
Aleksey Medvedev (BLR)	3–0	Chen Xingqiang (CHN)	3–0 PO

==== Pool 3 ====
Pos	Athlete	Pld	W	L	CP	TP	Qualification
1	Kerry McCoy (USA)	2	2	0	7	13	Knockout round
2	Rajab Ashabaliyev (AZE)	2	1	1	4	4	
3	Mirabi Valiyev (UKR)	2	0	2	0	0	

Source: Official Report

	Score		CP
Mirabi Valiyev (UKR)	0–3	Kerry McCoy (USA)	0–3 PO
Rajab Ashabaliyev (AZE)	4–0 Fall	Mirabi Valiyev (UKR)	4–0 TO
Kerry McCoy (USA)	10–0	Rajab Ashabaliyev (AZE)	4–0 ST

==== Pool 4 ====
Pos	Athlete	Pld	W	L	CP	TP	Qualification
1	Artur Taymazov (UZB)	2	2	0	7	13	Knockout round
2	Aydın Polatçı (TUR)	2	1	1	3	3	
3	Zsolt Gombos (HUN)	2	0	2	0	0	

Source: Official Report

	Score		CP
Zsolt Gombos (HUN)	0–10	Artur Taymazov (UZB)	0–4 ST
Aydın Polatçı (TUR)	3–0	Zsolt Gombos (HUN)	3–0 PO
Artur Taymazov (UZB)	3–0	Aydın Polatçı (TUR)	3–0 PO

==== Pool 5 ====
Pos	Athlete	Pld	W	L	CP	TP	Qualification
1	David Musulbes (RUS)	2	2	0	7	5	Knockout round
2	Sven Thiele (GER)	2	1	1	4	10	
3	Peter Pecha (SVK)	2	0	2	0	0	

Source: Official Report

	Score		CP
Sven Thiele (GER)	10–0	Peter Pecha (SVK)	4–0 ST
David Musulbes (RUS)	5–0	Sven Thiele (GER)	3–0 PO
Peter Pecha (SVK)	WO	David Musulbes (RUS)	0–4 PA

==== Pool 6 ====
Pos	Athlete	Pld	W	L	CP	TP	Qualification
1	Abbas Jadidi (IRI)	2	2	0	6	13	Knockout round
2	Alex Modebadze (GEO)	2	1	1	3	5	
3	Efstathios Topalidis (GRE)	2	0	2	1	1	

Source: Official Report

	Score		CP
Efstathios Topalidis (GRE)	1–9	Abbas Jadidi (IRI)	1–3 PP
Alex Modebadze (GEO)	5–0	Efstathios Topalidis (GRE)	3–0 PO
Abbas Jadidi (IRI)	4–0	Alex Modebadze (GEO)	3–0 PO

=== Knockout round ===
Quarterfinals
Alexis Rodríguez (CUB)	4
Aleksey Medvedev (BLR)	0
Kerry McCoy (USA)	9
Artur Taymazov (UZB)	11

Semifinals
Alexis Rodríguez (CUB)	0
Artur Taymazov (UZB)	4^{F}
David Musulbes (RUS)	3
Abbas Jadidi (IRI)	0

Gold medal match
Artur Taymazov (UZB)	2
David Musulbes (RUS)	5
Bronze medal match
Alexis Rodríguez (CUB)	1
Abbas Jadidi (IRI)	0

Classification 5th–6th
Aleksey Medvedev (BLR)
Kerry McCoy (USA)	WO

== Final standing ==
Rank	Athlete
1st place, gold medalist(s)	David Musulbes (RUS)
2nd place, silver medalist(s)	Artur Taymazov (UZB)
3rd place, bronze medalist(s)	Alexis Rodríguez (CUB)
4	Abbas Jadidi (IRI)
5	Kerry McCoy (USA)
6	Aleksey Medvedev (BLR)
7	Sven Thiele (GER)
8	Aleksandr Kovalevsky (KGZ)
9	Rajab Ashabaliyev (AZE)
10	Alex Modebadze (GEO)
11	Aydın Polatçı (TUR)
12	Krasimir Kochev (BUL)
13	Dolgorsürengiin Sumiyaabazar (MGL)
14	Chen Xingqiang (CHN)
15	Efstathios Topalidis (GRE)
16	Peter Pecha (SVK)
17	Zsolt Gombos (HUN)
18	Mirabi Valiyev (UKR)
