= 1997 World Wrestling Championships – Men's freestyle 130 kg =

Men's freestyle 130 kg at the 1997 World Championships
- Venue: Yenisey Sports Palace
- Dates: 29–31 August 1997
- Competitors: 21 from 21 nations

Medalists
gold medal	Zekeriya Güçlü	Turkey
silver medal	Alexis Rodríguez	Cuba
bronze medal	David Musulbes	Russia

The men's freestyle 130 kilograms is a competition featured at the 1997 World Wrestling Championships, and was held at the Yenisey Sports Palace in Krasnoyarsk, Russia from 29 to 31 August 1997.

== Results ==
=== Round 1 ===
	Score	
Round of 32
Zsolt Gombos (HUN)	4–9	Feng Aigang (CHN)
Milan Mazáč (SVK)	1–3	Ebrahim Mehraban (IRI)
Zekeriya Güçlü (TUR)	4–1	Aleksey Medvedev (BLR)
Oleg Ladik (CAN)	3–2	Igor Klimov (KAZ)
Gelegjamtsyn Ösökhbayar (MGL)	4–2	Kim Kil-soo (KOR)
Krasimir Kochev (BUL)	3–0	Oleg Naniev (UZB)
Juan García (VEN)	0–11	Alexis Rodríguez (CUB)
Mamuka Pretsuashvili (GEO)	0–8	David Musulbes (RUS)
Sven Thiele (GER)	1–6 Fall	Tom Erikson (USA)
Tasos Simonidis (GRE)	0–5	Yuri Chobitko (UKR)
Hiroyuki Obata (JPN)		Bye

=== Round 2 ===
	Score	
Round of 16
Hiroyuki Obata (JPN)	0–3	Feng Aigang (CHN)
Ebrahim Mehraban (IRI)	0–3	Zekeriya Güçlü (TUR)
Oleg Ladik (CAN)	4–1	Gelegjamtsyn Ösökhbayar (MGL)
Krasimir Kochev (BUL)	1–3	Alexis Rodríguez (CUB)
David Musulbes (RUS)	0–2	Tom Erikson (USA)
Yuri Chobitko (UKR)		Bye
Repechage
Zsolt Gombos (HUN)	0–0	Milan Mazáč (SVK)
Aleksey Medvedev (BLR)	3–0	Igor Klimov (KAZ)
Kim Kil-soo (KOR)	1–4	Oleg Naniev (UZB)
Juan García (VEN)	0–4 Fall	Mamuka Pretsuashvili (GEO)
Sven Thiele (GER)	7–0 Fall	Tasos Simonidis (GRE)

=== Round 3 ===
	Score	
Quarterfinals
Yuri Chobitko (UKR)	2–1 Fall	Feng Aigang (CHN)
Zekeriya Güçlü (TUR)	3–1	Oleg Ladik (CAN)
Alexis Rodríguez (CUB)		Bye
Tom Erikson (USA)		Bye
Repechage
Milan Mazáč (SVK)	1–3	Aleksey Medvedev (BLR)
Oleg Naniev (UZB)	0–0	Mamuka Pretsuashvili (GEO)
Sven Thiele (GER)	5–0	Hiroyuki Obata (JPN)
Ebrahim Mehraban (IRI)	4–0	Gelegjamtsyn Ösökhbayar (MGL)
Krasimir Kochev (BUL)	0–2	David Musulbes (RUS)

=== Round 4 ===
	Score	
Semifinals
Yuri Chobitko (UKR)	0–1	Zekeriya Güçlü (TUR)
Alexis Rodríguez (CUB)	4–1	Tom Erikson (USA)
Repechage
Aleksey Medvedev (BLR)	3–0	Oleg Naniev (UZB)
Sven Thiele (GER)	3–1	Ebrahim Mehraban (IRI)
David Musulbes (RUS)	9–4	Feng Aigang (CHN)
Oleg Ladik (CAN)		Bye

=== Round 5 ===
	Score	
Repechage
Oleg Ladik (CAN)	1–4	Aleksey Medvedev (BLR)
Sven Thiele (GER)	0–4	David Musulbes (RUS)

=== Round 6 ===
	Score	
Repechage
Yuri Chobitko (UKR)	0–4	David Musulbes (RUS)
Aleksey Medvedev (BLR)	3–4	Tom Erikson (USA)

=== Finals ===
	Score	
5th place match
Yuri Chobitko (UKR)	2–4	Aleksey Medvedev (BLR)
Bronze medal match
David Musulbes (RUS)	4–0	Tom Erikson (USA)
Final
Zekeriya Güçlü (TUR)	4–0	Alexis Rodríguez (CUB)
