= 1995 Yasar Dogu Tournament =

Yasar Dogu 1995
- Host city: Ankara, Turkey
- Dates: 11–13 March 1995

The Yasar Dogu Tournament 1995, was a wrestling event held in Ankara, Turkey between 11 and 13 March 1995. This tournament was held as 23rd.

This international tournament includes competition includes competition in men's freestyle wrestling. This ranking tournament was held in honor of the two time Olympic Champion, Yaşar Doğu.

== Medal table ==
Rank	Nation	Gold	Silver	Bronze	Total
1	Turkey	4	3	2	9
2	Russia	4	2	1	7
3	South Korea	2	2	0	4
4	Ukraine	0	2	3	5
5	Kazakhstan	0	1	1	2
6	Bulgaria	0	0	1	1
6	Kyrgyzstan	0	0	1	1
6	Uzbekistan	0	0	1	1
Totals (8 entries)		10	10	10	30

== Medal overview ==
=== Men's freestyle ===
Event	Gold	Silver	Bronze
48 kg	Moon Myung Seok; South Korea	Soon-Won Jung; South Korea	Sherzod Yuldashev; Kyrgyzstan
52 kg	Metin Topaktaş; Turkey	Maulen Mamyrov; Kazakhstan	Vladimir Torgovkin; Russia
57 kg	Harun Doğan; Turkey	İsmail Zurnacı; Turkey	Aslanbek Fidarov; Ukraine
62 kg	Muharrem Demireğen; Turkey	Jae-Sung Jang; South Korea	Elbrus Tedeev; Ukraine
68 kg	Ho Hwang Sang; South Korea	Adem Kaya; Turkey	Plamen Paskalev; Bulgaria
74 kg	Kamil Kocaağaoğlu; Turkey	Tahmuras Ourosov; Russia	Woo Hee Jong; Kazakhstan
82 kg	Stanislav Albergor; Russia	Sergey Gusrunuk; Ukraine	K.Rovtan; Uzbekistan
90 kg	Vitaly Gizeo; Russia	Mihail Kondratov; Russia	Sait Murtazaaliev; Ukraine
100 kg	Sergey Kovalevsky; Russia	Kenan Şimşek; Turkey	Ahmet Doğu; Turkey
130 kg	Andrey Shumilin; Russia	Yuriy Cobutko; Ukraine	Zekeriya Güçlü; Turkey

== Participating nations ==
- Turkey
- Russia
- Ukraine
- South Korea
- Kazakhstan
- Bulgaria
- Iran
- Hungary
- Belarus
- Kyrgyzstan
- Azerbaijan
- Syria
- Poland
- Macedonia
- Turkmenistan
- Japan
- Albania
- Slovenia
- Moldova
- Mongolia
