= Mirabi Valiyev =

Ukrainian wrestler (born 1970)

Mirabi Valiyev (Ukrainian: Мірабі Валієв; born 13 September 1970) is a Ukrainian former wrestler. A former European champion, Valiyev competed at the 1996 Summer Olympics in Atlanta, Georgia, United States and the 2000 Summer Olympics in Sydney, New South Wales, Australia.

== Early life ==
Valiyev was born on 13 September 1970 in Akhalgori, Georgian Soviet Socialist Republic, Soviet Union (now in South Ossetia).

== Career ==
Valiyev competed at the 1993 European Wrestling Championships in Istanbul, Turkey. He finished as runner-up, winning a silver medal, after losing to Mahmut Demir of Turkey in the gold medal bout of the men's freestyle –130 kg category. He was also runner-up in the same category at the 1993 World Wrestling Championships in Toronto, Ontario, Canada, losing to Bruce Baumgartner of the United States in the final of the men's freestyle –130 kg category.

The following year, at the 1994 European Wrestling Championships in Rome, Italy, he became European champion after exacting revenge on Demir, defeating him in the gold medal bout of the men's freestyle –130 kg category. At the 1994 World Wrestling Championships, Valiyev finished fourth after losing to Aleksey Medvedev of Belarus in the bronze medal bout of the men's freestyle –130 kg category.

Defending his title, he again faced Demir in the final of the men's freestyle –130 kg category at the 1995 European Wrestling Championships in Fribourg, Switzerland. However, he was unable to retain the championship after losing to Demir.

At the 1996 European Wrestling Championships in Oslo, Norway, he won bronze in the men's freestyle –130 kg category.

Valiyev was selected to take part in the 1996 Summer Olympics in Atlanta, Georgia, United States. He faced his rival Demir in the first round of the men's freestyle –130 kg category but lost and was eliminated at the first hurdle. In the classification rounds, he defeated Amarjit Singh of Great Britain and Feng Aigang of China before losing to Aleksandr Kovalevsky of Kyrgyzstan. He then defeated Petros Bourdoulis of Greece to finish seventh overall.

Valiyev finished eighth in the men's freestyle –130 kg category at both the 1999 European Wrestling Championships in Minsk, Belarus and the 1999 World Wrestling Championships in Ankara, Turkey.

He was selected to take part in the 2000 Summer Olympics in Sydney, New South Wales, Australia. In the pool stage of the men's freestyle –130 kg, Valiyev lost both his matches against Kerry McCoy of the United States and Rajab Ashabaliyev of Azerbaijan.
