= 2002 Yasar Dogu Tournament =

Yasar Dogu 2002
- Host city: Ankara, Turkey
- Dates: 2–3 March 2003
- Stadium: Ataturk Sports Complex

The Yasar Dogu Tournament 2002, was a wrestling event held in Ankara, Turkey between 2 and 3 March 2002. This tournament was held as 30th.

This international tournament includes competition includes competition in men's freestyle wrestling. This ranking tournament was held in honor of the two time Olympic Champion, Yaşar Doğu.

== Medal table ==
Rank	Nation	Gold	Silver	Bronze	Total
1	Turkey	5	5	3	13
2	South Korea	1	0	1	2
2	United States	1	0	1	2
4	Japan	0	2	0	2
5	Azerbaijan	0	0	1	1
5	Kazakhstan	0	0	1	1
Totals (6 entries)		7	7	7	21

== Medal overview ==
=== Men's freestyle ===
Event	Gold	Silver	Bronze
55 kg	Teague Moore; United States	Tomohiro Matsunaga; Japan	Ersin Çetin; Turkey
60 kg	Tevfik Odabaşı; Turkey	Arif Kama; Turkey	Nazım Alijanov; Azerbaijan
66 kg	Jang Jae Sung; South Korea	Kazuhiko Ikematsu; Japan	Jin-Kuk Bae; South Korea
74 kg	Fahrettin Özata; Turkey	Ahmet Gülhan; Turkey	Joes Williams; United States
84 kg	Serhat Balcı; Turkey	Nuri Zengin; Turkey	Osman Özgün; Turkey
96 kg	Fatih Çakıroğlu; Turkey	Ahmet Doğu; Turkey	İslam Bayramukov; Kazakhstan
120 kg	Zekeriya Güçlü; Turkey	Aydın Polatçı; Turkey	Recep Kara; Turkey

== Participating nations ==
- Turkey
- United States
- Kazakhstan
- South Korea
- Iran
- Japan
- Bulgaria
- Georgia
- Azerbaijan
- Mongolia
- Kyrgyzstan
- Romania
- Poland
- Russia
- Turkmenistan
