= Remzi Musaoğlu =

Turkish wrestler (born 1965)

Personal information
- Nationality: Turkish
- Born: 25 January 1965 (age 61) Kardzhali, Bulgaria

Sport
- Sport: Wrestling
Medal record
Freestyle wrestling
Representing Turkey
European Championships
Gold medal – first place	1993 Istanbul	57 kg
Silver medal – second place	1991 Stuttgart	57 kg
Silver medal – second place	1992 Kaposvar	57 kg
Yasar Dogu Tournament
Gold medal – first place	1991 Istanbul	57 kg
Silver medal – second place	1993 Istanbul	57 kg
Representing Bulgaria
FILA Grand Prix Gala
Silver medal – second place	1988 Budapest	57 kg
Tbilisi International Tournament
Silver medal – second place	1987 Tbilisi	57 kg
Bulgarian National Championships
Gold medal – first place	1988 Varna	57 kg
European Juniors Championships
Gold medal – first place	1984 Łódź	56 kg

Remzi Musaoğlu (born 25 January 1965) is a wrestler from Bulgaria who has wrestled for both: Bulgaria and Turkey. He wrestled at an international competition only in the bantamweight division (57 kg).

Remzi Musaoğlu won a silver medal at the 1984 Espoir (promising youth) European Championship under the name of Remzi Musov in the 52 kg.

At the 1984 Junior European Championship, Remzi Musov won the gold medal in the 56 kg category by defeating USSR Senior National Cup and World Junior champion Egiya Musoyan, and Florinel Ioniță.

Domestically, Remzi Musov beat the strongest wrestlers, such as 1986 World Superchampionship winner Alben Kumbarov, multiple European champion and World medalist Stefan Ivanov, 1986 European champion and World medalist Georgi Kalchev, Olympic wrestler Ivan Tsochev, and 1984 Espoir European champion Rumen Pavlov, while also capturing the Bulgarian champion titles in 1987, 1988, and 1989. In Bulgaria, Remzi Musov was coached by Todor Galabov who had previously trained Olympiс champion Valentin Raychev.

Competing for Bulgaria under the name Valentin Ivanov, Remzi Musov won silver medals at the 1987 Tbilisi International Tournament, 1988 FILA Grand Prix Gala, and participated in the 1988 Summer Olympics.

In 1990, he emigrated to Turkey and immediately became one of the country's best freestyle wrestlers in the bantamweight division after defeating strong local athletes, including 1987 World Championship medalist and 1989 European champion Ahmet Ak. Competing at the 1990 Grand Prix of Germany, Remzi Musaoğlu won his first international medal for Turkey, taking home the bronze.

At the 1991 Yasar Dogu Tournament Remzi Musaoğlu won the gold medal, he beat Metin Topaktaş, and Ahmet Ak.

In 1991, he became the European vice-champion in Stuttgart, where he was obviously cheated out of the European title. In the German professional magazine Der Ringer, No. 5/1991, page 13, it says: "To make a long story short: Soviet man Bagavdin Umakhanov received the title as a gift because Remzi Musaoğlu of Turkey was deprived of several points by an incompetent referee in the final."

At the 1992 European Championship he lost to Bagavdin Umakhanov in the final with a score of 5-3.

He competed in the men's freestyle 57 kg at the 1992 Summer Olympics. Remzi Musaoğlu won 7-3 against Kendall Cross in the 4-th round.

At the 1993 European Championships Remzi Musaoğlu won the gold medal, he defeated 1991 World Champion and 1992 Olympic silver medalist Sergey Smal in the final with the score of 5-3.
