= Aydın Polatçı =

Turkish freestyle wrestler (born 1977)

Medal record

Men's Freestyle wrestling

Representing Turkey

Olympic Games
Bronze medal – third place	2004 Athens	120 kg

World Championships
Gold medal – first place	2005 Budapest	120 kg
Bronze medal – third place	2002 Tehran	120 kg

European Championships
Gold medal – first place	1998 Bratislava	130 kg
Gold medal – first place	2004 Ankara	120 kg
Silver medal – second place	1999 Minsk	130 kg

World Cup
Silver medal – second place	2001 Baltimore	130 kg

Mediterranean Games
Gold medal – first place	2005 Almeria	120 kg

World Military Championship
Gold medal – first place	2000 Camp Lejeune	130 kg FS
Gold medal – first place	2000 Camp Lejeune	130 kg GR
Silver medal – second place	1997 Ostia	130 kg GR
Bronze medal – third place	1997 Ostia	130 kg FS

Yasar Dogu Tournament
Gold medal – first place	1998 Ankara	125 kg
Gold medal – first place	1999 Ankara	125 kg
Gold medal – first place	2000 Ankara	125 kg
Gold medal – first place	2003 Ankara	120 kg
Gold medal – first place	2004 Ankara	120 kg
Silver medal – second place	1996 Ankara	130 kg
Silver medal – second place	1997 Ankara	125 kg
Silver medal – second place	2002 Ankara	120 kg
Bronze medal – third place	2008 Ankara	120 kg

World Juniors Championships
Gold medal – first place	1997 Helsinki	115 kg

European Juniors Championships
Gold medal – first place	1995 Witten	115 kg
Gold medal – first place	1997 Istanbul	115 kg

Aydın Polatçı (born 15 May 1977) is a Turkish wrestler. He was born in Istanbul. He was Olympic bronze medalist in Freestyle wrestling in 2004. He also competed at the 2000 and 2008 Olympics.

== Wrestling career ==
Aydın Polatçı grew up in his birthplace and took up wrestling there in 1993, having previously competed in the Turkish national sport of oil wrestling. He became a heavyweight at 1.90 metres tall and around 125 kg in body weight. After his first successes at junior level, he became a member of the Aski Ankara wrestling club, where Mehmet Polatçı became his coach. Aydın Polatçı preferred the free style throughout his career. He only competed in the Greco-Roman style twice at military world championships.

He made his first international start in 1995 at the European Junior Championships in Witten, where he took first place in the heavyweight age group (up to the age of 18) in the free style ahead of Tamás Ábrahám from Hungary and Oleg Khorpiakov from Russia.

In 1997, he wrestled in several international championships at junior level, but also already at senior level. At the World Military Championships that year he came second in the heavyweight Greco-Roman style behind Alexei Kolesnikov of Russia and third in the free style behind David Musulbes of Russia and Alireza Rezaei of Iran. At the 1997 European Junior Championships in Istanbul and at the 1997 World Junior Championships in Helsinki, he took first place in both events. In Istanbul, he won ahead of Artjom Achigev from Russia and Alex Modebadze from Georgia and in Helsinki ahead of Alexis Rodríguez from Cuba and Artjom Achigev. After the retirement of the 1996 Olympic champion Mahmut Demir, he was also entered in the 1997 European Senior Championships in Warsaw. However, he narrowly missed out on a medal there. Turkey used Zekeriya Güçlü at the 1997 World Championships.

In 1998, he became European champion in Bratislava, defeating in turn David Musulbes, Krassimir Kochev of Bulgaria, Sven Thiele and Milan Mazáč of Slovakia. At the 1998 World Championships in Tehran, he lost his first fight against Andrey Shumilin from Russia. After four victorious bouts, he then lost to Kerry McCoy of the US in the fight for the bronze medal.

In 1999, Aydın Polatçı lost again to Andrei Shumilin (3:4) at the European Championships in Minsk after four victories in the final. At the 1999 World Championships in Ankara, his home country, he lost on points (6:10 techn. points) in his third fight against the unknown American Stephen Neal, who went on to become world champion. According to the rules in force at the time, he had to be eliminated and only finished in 5th place.

In 2000, he only competed at the Olympic Games in Sydney. He won his first fight there against Zsolt Gombos from Hungary, but then lost to the later silver medallist Artur Taymazov from Uzbekistan, which meant his elimination.

At the 2001 World Championships in Sofia, Aydın Polatçı finished in fifth place after losing his third fight to David Musulbes. At the 2002 World Championships in Tehran, he won a bronze medal. After losing to David MusuLbes in the semi-finals, he defeated the Georgian Davit Otiashvili.

In 2004, Aydın Polatçı won his second senior international title at the European Championships in Ankara. He beat Boschidar Boyadzhiev from Bulgaria, Zoltán Farkas from Hungary, Radosław Jankowski from Poland, Sven Thiele and Kuramagomed Kuramagomedov from Russia. At the 2004 Olympic Games in Athens, after victories over Rareș Daniel Chintojan of Romania, Sven Thiele and Alexis Rodríguez Valera, he met Artur Taymazov, against whom he again lost on points. In the fight for the Olympic bronze medal, he defeated Marid Mutalimov from Kazakhstan. This bronze medal remained the only Olympic medal of his career.

After winning the 2005 Mediterranean Games in Almería, he competed at the World Championships in Budapest that year. There he then managed to win the title at a World Championship for the first time with victories over Tolly Thompson from the United States, Rareș Daniel Chintojan, Kurmagomed Kuramagomedov and Alexis Rodríguez.
