= 1994 Yasar Dogu Tournament =

Yasar Dogu 1994
- Host city: Istanbul, Turkey
- Dates: 29–30 January 1994

The Yasar Dogu Tournament 1994, was a wrestling event held in Istanbul, Turkey between 29 and 30 January 1994. This tournament was held as 22nd.

This international tournament includes competition includes competition in men's freestyle wrestling. This ranking tournament was held in honor of the two time Olympic Champion, Yaşar Doğu.

== Medal table ==
Rank	Nation	Gold	Silver	Bronze	Total
1	Turkey	4	7	3	14
2	Ukraine	2	1	2	5
3	South Korea	2	0	1	3
4	France	1	0	0	1
4	United States	1	0	0	1
6	Poland	0	1	0	1
6	Russia	0	1	0	1
8	Romania	0	0	2	2
9	Azerbaijan	0	0	1	1
9	Moldova	0	0	1	1
Totals (10 entries)		10	10	10	30

== Medal overview ==
=== Men's freestyle ===
Event	Gold	Silver	Bronze
48 kg	Soon-Won Jung; South Korea	Vugar Orucev; Russia	Moon Myung Seok; South Korea
52 kg	Michail Kuchnir; Ukraine	Metin Topaktaş; Turkey	Namig Abdullayev; Azerbaijan
57 kg	İsmail Zurnacı; Turkey	Aslanbek Fidarov; Ukraine	Harun Doğan; Turkey
62 kg	Muharrem Demireğen; Turkey	İsmail Faikoğlu; Turkey	Michael Tchepnov; Ukraine
68 kg	Ho Hwang Sang; South Korea	Ömer Üngör; Turkey	Dima-Ioan Andronic; Romania
74 kg	Alan Msokov; Ukraine	Kamil Kocaağaoğlu; Turkey	Victor Peicov; Moldova
82 kg	Alcide Legrand; France	Yalçın Özdemir; Turkey	Nicolai Ghita; Romania
90 kg	Don Croig; United States	Ahmet Doğu; Turkey	Hikmet Günaydın; Turkey
100 kg	Kenan Şimşek; Turkey	Marek Garmolovicz; Poland	Şenol Karagöz; Turkey
130 kg	Mahmut Demir; Turkey	Zekeriya Güçlü; Turkey	Besifi Mozholia; Ukraine

== Participating nations ==
- Turkey
- Ukraine
- Japan
- South Korea
- Romania
- Azerbaijan
- France
- United States
- Poland
- Moldova
- Latvia
- Canada
- Yugoslavia
