= Zekeriya Güçlü =

Turkish freestyle wrestler (1972–2010)

Personal information
- Born: 27 April 1972 Razgrad, Bulgaria
- Died: 20 February 2010 (aged 37) Istanbul, Turkey
- Height: 1.80 m (5 ft 11 in)
- Weight: 125 kg (276 lb; 19.7 st)

Sport
- Country: Turkey
- Sport: Amateur wrestling
- Event: Freestyle
Medal record
Men's freestyle wrestling
Representing Turkey
World Championships
Gold medal – first place	1997 Krasnoyarsk	130 kg
European Championships
Bronze medal – third place	2002 Baku	120 kg
World Cup
Silver medal – second place	1994 Edmonton	130 kg
Mediterranean Games
Gold medal – first place	2001 Tunis	130 kg
Gold medal – first place	1997 Bari	125kg
Military World Games
Gold medal – first place	1995 Rome	130 kg
Yasar Dogu Tournament
Gold medal – first place	1997 Ankara	125 kg
Gold medal – first place	2002 Ankara	120 kg
Silver medal – second place	1992 Istanbul	130 kg
Silver medal – second place	1994 Istanbul	130 kg
Silver medal – second place	1999 Ankara	125 kg
Silver medal – second place	2000 Ankara	125 kg
Bronze medal – third place	1991 Istanbul	130 kg
Bronze medal – third place	1995 Ankara	130 kg
Bronze medal – third place	1996 Ankara	130 kg
Grand Prix of Germany
Gold medal – first place	1995 Leipzig	130 kg
Bronze medal – third place	1999 Leipzig	130 kg
World Espoir Championships
Silver medal – second place	1991 Tehran	130 kg
European Espoir Championships
Gold medal – first place	1992 Szekesfehervar	130 kg
Balkan Espoir Championships
Gold medal – first place	1990 Sakarya	130 kg
World Juniors Championships
Gold medal – first place	1990 Istanbul	115 kg
World University Championship
Gold medal – first place	2000 Tokyo	130 kg
Silver medal – second place	1998 Ankara	130 kg
Bronze medal – third place	1996 Ankara	130 kg

Zekeriya Güçlü (April 7, 1972 – February 21, 2010) was a Turkish freestyle wrestler competing in the 125 division. He won the gold medal at the 1997 World Wrestling Championships.

== Wrestling career ==
Zekeriya Güçlü was born in Bulgaria as a member of the Turkish minority. There he also took up wrestling as a youth and became a member of the Bulgarian national youth team in the free style. During a competition in Hungary, he took refuge in the Turkish consulate in Budapest and came to Turkey this way. In Turkey he became a member of the Istanbul Gemi Sanayi Spor Kulübü wrestling club and later of the Gebze Belediye Spor Kulübü club, where he was trained by D. Turan and İsmail Nizamoğlu. He was already a full-grown heavyweight at a young age, weighing close to 130 kg at a height of 1.80 metres.

He started his international career at the 1990 World Junior Championships in Istanbul, where he won the heavyweight championship title ahead of Reza Kordjazi from Iran and Boschko Matev from Bulgaria. At the 1991 World Junior Championships (Espoirs) in Prievidza, he came 2nd in the heavyweight division behind Shorik Kashinov of Russia. Finally, in 1992 in Székesfehérvár, he also became European Junior Champion in the Espoirs ahead of Tibor Balogh from Hungary.

After his junior years, Zekeriya Güçlü did not make any appearances in the international championships until 1997. The reason was the outstanding Turkish heavyweight wrestlers Mahmut Demir, Olympic champion in 1996, and Aydın Polatçı, who challenged him for starting positions. However, he became Military World Champion in 1995 ahead of Yuriy Shobitko of Ukraine and Oleg Khorpyakov of Russia and came 2nd behind Alyaksei Myadsvedseu of Belarus at the 1996 World University Championships in Tehran.

In 1997, he competed in the World Championships in Krasnoyarsk and became the new World Heavyweight Champion with victories over Aleksey Medvedev, Ebrahim Mehraban from Iran, Oleg Ladik from Canada, Yuri Chobitko and Alexis Rodríguez from Cuba. This was the greatest success of his entire career.

Zekeriya Güçlü competed in the 2000 European Championships in Budapest, but lost to David Musulbes of Russia after defeating Aleksey Medvedev, which meant he had to retire under the rules at the time and only finished 9th. However, he became World University Heavyweight Champion in Tokyo in 2000 ahead of Justin David Beauparlant of Canada.

In 2001, Zekeriya Güçlü lost to Sven Thiele of Germany and Ivan Ishchenko of Ukraine at the European Championships in Budapest, finishing in 8th place. To round off his career, however, he then won another bronze medal at the European Heavyweight Championships in Baku in 2002 after victories over Yuri Shobitko and Italy's Donatus Manza, a loss to David Musuľbes and a victory over Sven Thiele.

After finishing his career, Güçlü moved to his home village of Kriwiza to become a businessman and politician for the Movement for Rights and Freedoms (DPS) party. Since 2008, he has been the DPS district executive chairman and a local councillor in Samuil town.

Zekeriya Güçlü died on 21 February 2010 after a three-month stay in an Istanbul clinic.
