= 1996 Yasar Dogu Tournament =

Yasar Dogu 1996
- Host city: Ankara, Turkey
- Dates: 11–13 March 1996

The Yasar Dogu Tournament 1996, was a wrestling event held in Ankara, Turkey between 11 and 13 March 1996. This tournament was held as 24th.

This international tournament includes competition includes competition in men's freestyle wrestling. This ranking tournament was held in honor of the two time Olympic Champion, Yaşar Doğu.

== Medal table ==
Rank	Nation	Gold	Silver	Bronze	Total
1	Turkey	5	3	2	10
2	South Korea	1	1	2	4
3	Kazakhstan	1	1	1	3
4	Iran	1	0	0	1
4	Japan	1	0	0	1
4	Ukraine	1	0	0	1
7	Mongolia	0	1	2	3
8	Russia	0	1	1	2
9	Italy	0	1	0	1
9	Kyrgyzstan	0	1	0	1
9	Slovakia	0	1	0	1
12	Poland	0	0	1	1
12	Romania	0	0	1	1
Totals (13 entries)		10	10	10	30

== Medal overview ==
=== Men's freestyle ===
Event	Gold	Silver	Bronze
48 kg	Soon-Won Jung; South Korea	Piorty Youmschanov; Russia	Muhammed İri; Turkey
52 kg	Metin Topaktaş; Turkey	Lou Ressolini; Italy	German Konteyev; Russia
57 kg	Harun Doğan; Turkey	Tsogtbayar Tserenbaatar; Mongolia	Bator Parev; Mongolia
62 kg	Takahiro Wada; Japan	Jae-Sung Jang; South Korea	Chang Won Nor; South Korea
68 kg	Zaza Zazirov; Ukraine	Ömer Üngör; Turkey	Ho Hwang Sang; South Korea
74 kg	Nuri Zengin; Turkey	Nurbek İzabekov; Kyrgyzstan	Magomed Kourogliev; Kazakhstan
82 kg	Sebahattin Öztürk; Turkey	Elmadi Dshabrailov; Kazakhstan	Nicolae Ghita; Romania
90 kg	D.Tedeev; Kazakhstan	Jozef Lohyna; Slovakia	Robert Kostecki; Poland
100 kg	Alireza Rezaei; Iran	Ahmet Doğu; Turkey	Sumiyabasar Dolgorsuren; Mongolia
130 kg	Mahmut Demir; Turkey	Aydın Polatçı; Turkey	Zekeriya Güçlü; Turkey

== Participating nations ==
- Turkey
- Russia
- Ukraine
- South Korea
- Ukraine
- Kazakhstan
- Uzbekistan
- Iran
- Kyrgyzstan
- Hungary
- Azerbaijan
- Syria
- Poland
- Japan
- Slovakia
- Mongolia
- France
- Tunisia
- China
- Latvia
- Lithuania
- Italy
- Romania
- Italy
