= 2000 Yasar Dogu Tournament =

Yasar Dogu 2000
- Host city: Ankara, Turkey
- Dates: 6–7 May 2000

The Yasar Dogu Tournament 2000, was a wrestling event held in Ankara, Turkey between 6 and 7 May 2000. This tournament was held as 28th.

This international tournament includes competition includes competition in men's freestyle wrestling. This ranking tournament was held in honor of the two time Olympic Champion, Yaşar Doğu.

== Medal table ==
Rank	Nation	Gold	Silver	Bronze	Total
1	Turkey	3	5	2	10
2	Russia	3	1	4	8
3	Georgia	1	0	0	1
3	Kazakhstan	1	0	0	1
5	Ukraine	0	2	0	2
6	Kyrgyzstan	0	0	2	2
Totals (6 entries)		8	8	8	24

== Medal overview ==
=== Men's freestyle ===
Event	Gold	Silver	Bronze
54 kg	Marvera Almatin; Kazakhstan	Mevlana Kulaç; Turkey	Dimitri Largap; Russia
58 kg	Harun Doğan; Turkey	Petro Toarko; Ukraine	Alexandr Kalyvanot; Russia
63 kg	Soslan Tamaev; Russia	Abhaze Andsor; Ukraine	Murad Umakhanov; Russia
69 kg	Ahmet Gülhan; Turkey	Artour Zakhov; Russia	Almazbek Askarov; Kyrgyzstan
76 kg	Shamil Aliev; Russia	Gökhan Yavaşer; Turkey	Mirlan Modaliev; Kyrgyzstan
85 kg	Macharbek Hadarchev; Russia	Nuri Zengin; Turkey	Vadim Ladiev; Russia
97 kg	Eldar Kurtanidze; Georgia	Kaşif Şakiroğlu; Turkey	Ahmet Doğu; Turkey
125 kg	Aydın Polatçı; Turkey	Zekeriya Güçlü; Turkey	Ziya Güler; Turkey

== Participating nations ==
- Turkey
- Russia
- Ukraine
- Kyrgyzstan
- Kazakhstan
- Azerbaijan
- France
- Slovakia
- Turkmenistan
