= 1999 Yasar Dogu Tournament =

Yasar Dogu 1999
- Host city: Ankara, Turkey
- Dates: 12–14 February 1999

The Yasar Dogu Tournament 1999, was a wrestling event held in Ankara, Turkey between 12 and 14 February 1999. This tournament was held as 27th.

This international tournament includes competition includes competition in men's freestyle wrestling. This ranking tournament was held in honor of the two time Olympic Champion, Yaşar Doğu.

== Medal table ==
Rank	Nation	Gold	Silver	Bronze	Total
1	Turkey	4	6	2	12
2	Russia	2	0	3	5
3	United States	2	0	1	3
4	Bulgaria	0	1	0	1
4	Georgia	0	1	0	1
6	Azerbaijan	0	0	1	1
6	Canada	0	0	1	1
Totals (7 entries)		8	8	8	24

== Medal overview ==
=== Men's freestyle ===
Event	Gold	Silver	Bronze
54 kg	Sammie Henson; United States	Ivan Djorev; Bulgaria	Recep Zencirci; Turkey
58 kg	Harun Doğan; Turkey	Otar Tatishvili; Georgia	Matevei Matvaev; Russia
63 kg	Gasan Dimalov; Russia	Gürsen Uzunca; Turkey	Fikret Aker; Turkey
69 kg	Yüksel Şanlı; Turkey	Ahmet Gülhan; Turkey	Daniel Igali; Canada
76 kg	Adem Bazahoev; Russia	Aydın Halimoğlu; Turkey	Elşad Allahverdiyev; Azerbaijan
85 kg	Les Gutches; United States	Magomed Kurugliev; Turkey	Aleksi Koupnikov; Russia
97 kg	Ahmet Doğu; Turkey	Mustafa Gürsoy; Turkey	Aleksei Shemarov; Russia
125 kg	Aydın Polatçı; Turkey	Zekeriya Güçlü; Turkey	Kerry McCoy; United States

== Participating nations ==
- Turkey
- Russia
- United States
- Bulgaria
- Georgia
- Kazakhstan
- Azerbaijan
- Slovakia
- Romania
- Canada
- Kyrgyzstan
- Latvia
- Mongolia
- Spain
- United Kingdom
- Turkmenistan
- Finland
- Greece
- Macedonia
- Tunisia
