= 2005 Yasar Dogu Tournament =

Yasar Dogu 2005
- Host city: Samsun, Turkey
- Dates: 18–20 February

The Yasar Dogu Tournament 2005, was a wrestling event held in Samsun, Turkey between 18 and 20 February 2005. This tournament was held as 33rd.

This international tournament includes competition includes competition in men's freestyle wrestling. This ranking tournament was held in honor of the two time Olympic Champion, Yaşar Doğu.

== Medal table ==
Rank	Nation	Gold	Silver	Bronze	Total
1	Turkey	5	3	2	10
2	Russia	1	0	2	3
3	Japan	1	0	1	2
4	Iran	0	2	0	2
5	Azerbaijan	0	1	1	2
6	Tajikistan	0	1	0	1
7	South Korea	0	0	1	1
Totals (7 entries)		7	7	7	21

== Medal overview ==
=== Men's freestyle ===
Event	Gold	Silver	Bronze
55 kg	Tomohiro Matsunaga; Japan	Namik Abdullaev; Azerbaijan	Askerhan Navruzov; Azerbaijan
60 kg	Tevfik Odabaşı; Turkey	Murad Muhammedi; Iran	Eldar Mısırov; Russia
66 kg	Ondaz Ajan; Russia	Hamid Muhammed; Iran	Kim Dae Sung; South Korea
74 kg	Ahmet Gülhan; Turkey	Yusuf Abdüsselamov; Tajikistan	Fahrettin Özata; Turkey
84 kg	Serhat Balcı; Turkey	Gökhan Yavaşer; Turkey	Navruz Temrezov; Russia
96 kg	Fatih Çakıroğlu; Turkey	Hakan Koç; Turkey	Ahmet Selbest; Turkey
120 kg	Recep Kara; Turkey	Şaban Yılmaz; Turkey	Akihito Tanako; Japan

== Participating nations ==
- Turkey
- Iran
- Russia
- Japan
- South Korea
- Azerbaijan
- Bulgaria
- Kazakhstan
- Romania
- Georgia
- Tunisia
- Tajikistan
- Turkmenistan
- Iraq
