= 2008 Yasar Dogu Tournament =

Yasar Dogu 2008
- Host city: Ankara, Turkey
- Dates: 9–10 February
- Stadium: Ataturk Sports Complex

The Yasar Dogu Tournament 2008, was a wrestling event held in Ankara, Turkey between 9 and 10 February 2008. This tournament was held as 36th.

This international tournament includes competition in both men's and women's freestyle wrestling. This ranking tournament was held in honor of the two time Olympic Champion, Yaşar Doğu.

== Medal table ==
Rank	Nation	Gold	Silver	Bronze	Total
1	Mongolia	4	0	3	7
2	Iran	3	3	0	6
3	Turkey	3	2	9	14
4	Azerbaijan	2	2	3	7
5	Moldova	1	1	0	2
6	Sweden	1	0	0	1
7	Greece	0	3	1	4
8	Bulgaria	0	2	2	4
9	Guinea	0	1	0	1
10	Belarus	0	0	1	1
10	Georgia	0	0	1	1
10	Ivory Coast	0	0	1	1
10	Kazakhstan	0	0	1	1
10	Kyrgyzstan	0	0	1	1
10	Romania	0	0	1	1
10	Russia	0	0	1	1
10	Tajikistan	0	0	1	1
10	Tunisia	0	0	1	1
Totals (18 entries)		14	14	27	55

=== Team ranking ===
Rank	Men's freestyle		Women's freestyle	
Rank	Team	Points	Team	Points
1	Turkey	63	Mongolia	54
2	Iran	60	Turkey	50
3	Azerbaijan	41	Greece	35
4	Bulgaria	35	Azerbaijan	28
5	Georgia	19	Senegal	22

== Medal overview ==
=== Men's freestyle ===
Event	Gold	Silver	Bronze
55 kg	Tahgi Dadashi; Iran	Abbas Dabbaghi; Iran	Suhrab Atalay; Turkey
55 kg	Tahgi Dadashi; Iran	Abbas Dabbaghi; Iran	Vladislav Andreyev; Belarus
60 kg	Tevfik Odabaşı; Turkey	Anatolie Guidea; Bulgaria	Petru Toarcă; Romania
60 kg	Tevfik Odabaşı; Turkey	Anatolie Guidea; Bulgaria	Bazar Bazargoruev; Kyrgyzstan
66 kg	Yasin Bolat; Turkey	Emin Azizov; Azerbaijan	Serafim Barzakov; Bulgaria
66 kg	Yasin Bolat; Turkey	Emin Azizov; Azerbaijan	Shamil Abdullaev; Russia
74 kg	Ahmet Gülhan; Turkey	Meisam Mostafa-Jokar; Iran	Zaur Salauthinov; Tajikistan
74 kg	Ahmet Gülhan; Turkey	Meisam Mostafa-Jokar; Iran	Agil Guliyev; Azerbaijan
84 kg	Hamed Tatari; Iran	Serhat Balcı; Turkey	Navruz Temrezov; Azerbaijan
84 kg	Hamed Tatari; Iran	Serhat Balcı; Turkey	Ali İmamoğlu; Turkey
96 kg	Khetag Gazyumov; Azerbaijan	Amir Ganji; Iran	Hakan Koç; Turkey
96 kg	Khetag Gazyumov; Azerbaijan	Amir Ganji; Iran	Sait Bingöl; Turkey
120 kg	Fardin Masoumi; Iran	Bozidar Bojadziev; Bulgaria	Lazare Marsagishvili; Georgia
120 kg	Fardin Masoumi; Iran	Bozidar Bojadziev; Bulgaria	Aydın Polatçı; Turkey

=== Women's freestyle ===
Event	Gold	Silver	Bronze
48 kg	Enkhiargal Tsogtbazar; Mongolia	Fani Psatha; Greece	Marva Meziani; Tunisia
48 kg	Enkhiargal Tsogtbazar; Mongolia	Fani Psatha; Greece	Suren Davaa; Mongolia
51 kg	Isabelle Sambovsen; Sweden	Valeria Budu; Moldova	Otgontsetseg Davaasuren; Mongolia
51 kg	Isabelle Sambovsen; Sweden	Valeria Budu; Moldova	Dilek Atakol; Turkey
55 kg	Naidan Otgonjargal; Mongolia	Toure Nene; Guinea	Sofia Paumpouridov; Greece
55 kg	Naidan Otgonjargal; Mongolia	Toure Nene; Guinea	Ekhbayar Tsevesmed; Mongolia
59 kg	Ludmila Cristea; Moldova	Elvina Mursalova; Azerbaijan	Miruyert Dynbeyoula; Kazakhstan
59 kg	Ludmila Cristea; Moldova	Elvina Mursalova; Azerbaijan	Sona Ahmadli; Azerbaijan
63 kg	Olesya Zamula; Azerbaijan	Agoro Papavasilov; Greece	Elina Vaseva; Bulgaria
63 kg	Olesya Zamula; Azerbaijan	Agoro Papavasilov; Greece	Figen Önal; Turkey
67 kg	Ochirbatyn Nasanburmaa; Mongolia	Maria Kachina; Turkey	Burcu Örskaya; Turkey
72 kg	Ochirbatyn Burmaa; Mongolia	Maria Vryoni; Greece	Seda Ünal; Turkey
72 kg	Ochirbatyn Burmaa; Mongolia	Maria Vryoni; Greece	Natasha Sandrine; Ivory Coast

== Participating nations ==
- Turkey
- Azerbaijan
- Lithuania
- Macedonia
- Ukraine
- Egypt
- Greece
- Romania
- Georgia
- Poland
- Hungary
- Mongolia
- Tunisia
- Kyrgyzstan
- Jordan
- Syria
- Uzbekistan
- Bulgaria
- Tajikistan
- France
- Kazakhstan
- Iran
- Guinea
- Somalia
- Cameroon
- South Africa
- Ivory Coast
- Democratic Republic of the Congo
- Madagascar
- Belarus
- Sweden
- Senegal
