= 1992 Yasar Dogu Tournament =

Yasar Dogu 1992
- Host city: Istanbul, Turkey
- Dates: 15–16 February 1992

The Yasar Dogu Tournament 1992, was a wrestling event held in Istanbul, Turkey between 15 and 16 January 1992. This tournament was held as 20th.

This international tournament includes competition includes competition in men's freestyle wrestling. This ranking tournament was held in honor of the two time Olympic Champion, Yaşar Doğu.

== Medal table ==
Rank	Nation	Gold	Silver	Bronze	Total
1	Turkey	6	6	4	16
2	Russia	2	0	2	4
3	Germany	1	1	0	2
4	South Korea	1	0	1	2
5	Hungary	0	2	0	2
6	Bulgaria	0	1	2	3
7	Poland	0	0	1	1
Totals (7 entries)		10	10	10	30

== Medal overview ==
=== Men's freestyle ===
Event	Gold	Silver	Bronze
48 kg	Yakup Özden; Turkey	Hayrettin Baydur; Turkey	Vassil Gogolev; Russia
52 kg	Park Yong Han; South Korea	Ahmet Orel; Turkey	Zeki Bulut; Turkey
57 kg	İsmail Zurnacı; Turkey	Bela Nagy; Hungary	Alben Kaumbarov; Bulgaria
62 kg	Goha Makoev; Russia	Hüseyin Öztürk; Turkey	Mo Kyung Seon; South Korea
68 kg	Fatih Özbaş; Turkey	Andreas Kubiak; Germany	Ercan Tanrıverdi; Turkey
74 kg	Andre Backhaus; Germany	Valentin Zhelev; Bulgaria	Krzysztof Walencik; Poland
82 kg	Sebahatttin Öztürk; Turkey	László Dvorák; Hungary	Nicolai Stojanov; Bulgaria
90 kg	Dzhambolat Tedeyev; Russia	Ahmet Doğu; Turkey	Kenan Şimşek; Turkey
100 kg	Ali Kayalı; Turkey	Ömer Aslantaş; Turkey	Şenol Karagöz; Turkey
130 kg	Mahmut Demir; Turkey	Zekeriya Güçlü; Turkey	Igor Klimov; Russia

== Participating nations ==
- Turkey
- Russia
- Germany
- South Korea
- Hungary
- Bulgaria
- Poland
- Iran
- China
- Romania
- France
