= 2007 Yasar Dogu Tournament =

Yasar Dogu 2007
- Host city: Ankara, Turkey
- Dates: 3–4 March
- Stadium: Ataturk Sports Complex

The Yasar Dogu Tournament 2007, was a wrestling event held in Ankara, Turkey between 3 and 4 March 2007. This tournament was held as 35th.

This international tournament includes competition includes competition in men's freestyle wrestling. This ranking tournament was held in honor of the two time Olympic Champion, Yaşar Doğu.

== Medal table ==
Rank	Nation	Gold	Silver	Bronze	Total
1	Turkey	4	3	4	11
2	Japan	1	2	1	4
3	Russia	1	1	2	4
4	Greece	1	0	0	1
5	Georgia	0	1	1	2
6	Kazakhstan	0	0	2	2
6	United States	0	0	2	2
8	Germany	0	0	1	1
8	Mongolia	0	0	1	1
Totals (9 entries)		7	7	14	28

== Medal overview ==
=== Men's freestyle ===
Event	Gold	Silver	Bronze
55 kg	Tahamiro Matsunoga; Japan	Hidenori Taoka; Japan	Bayaraagiin Naranbaatar; Mongolia
55 kg	Tahamiro Matsunoga; Japan	Hidenori Taoka; Japan	Marcel Ewald; Germany
60 kg	Ersin Çetin; Turkey	Zelimkhan Huseynov; Russia	Kenji Inoue; Japan
60 kg	Ersin Çetin; Turkey	Zelimkhan Huseynov; Russia	Ramazan Saritov; Russia
66 kg	Ramazan Şahin; Turkey	Tatsuhiro Yonemitsu; Japan	Zack Esposito; United States
66 kg	Ramazan Şahin; Turkey	Tatsuhiro Yonemitsu; Japan	Rasul Dzavkaev; Russia
74 kg	Emzarios Bentinidis; Greece	Ayhan Sucu; Turkey	Ahmet Gülhan; Turkey
74 kg	Emzarios Bentinidis; Greece	Ayhan Sucu; Turkey	Giorgi Marsagishvili; Georgia
84 kg	Serhat Balcı; Turkey	Davyd Bichinashvili; Georgia	Abdullah Güngör; Turkey
84 kg	Serhat Balcı; Turkey	Davyd Bichinashvili; Georgia	Fatih Koyuncu; Turkey
96 kg	Shirvani Muradov; Russia	Yasin Kılıç; Turkey	Nurjan Katayev; Kazakhstan
96 kg	Shirvani Muradov; Russia	Yasin Kılıç; Turkey	Abay Kargabov; Kazakhstan
120 kg	Fatih Çakıroğlu; Turkey	Recep Kara; Turkey	Ali Rıza Kaya; Turkey
120 kg	Fatih Çakıroğlu; Turkey	Recep Kara; Turkey	Mikhail Gazaev; United States

== Participating nations ==
- Turkey
- United States
- Russia
- Egypt
- Mongolia
- Bulgaria
- Kazakhstan
- Georgia
- Azerbaijan
- South Korea
- Japan
- Moldova
- Poland
- Syria
- Switzerland
- Germany
