= 1993 Yasar Dogu Tournament =

Yasar Dogu 1993
- Host city: Istanbul, Turkey
- Dates: 29–30 January 1993

The Yasar Dogu Tournament 1993, was a wrestling event held in Istanbul, Turkey between 29 and 30 January 1993. This tournament was held as 21st.

This international tournament includes competition includes competition in men's freestyle wrestling. This ranking tournament was held in honor of the two time Olympic Champion, Yaşar Doğu.

== Medal table ==
Rank	Nation	Gold	Silver	Bronze	Total
1	Turkey	4	5	1	10
2	South Korea	2	0	0	2
3	Kazakhstan	1	1	2	4
4	Ukraine	1	0	3	4
5	Georgia	1	0	1	2
6	Russia	1	0	0	1
7	Moldova	0	1	1	2
8	Hungary	0	1	0	1
8	Kyrgyzstan	0	1	0	1
8	Poland	0	1	0	1
11	Iran	0	0	1	1
11	Slovakia	0	0	1	1
Totals (12 entries)		10	10	10	30

== Medal overview ==
=== Men's freestyle ===
Event	Gold	Silver	Bronze
48 kg	İlyas Şükrüoğlu; Turkey	R.Bedrettinov; Kazakhstan	Fevzi Kaynak; Turkey
52 kg	Michail Kuchnir; Ukraine	Vasile Yapteacru; Moldova	Maulen Mamyrov; Kazakhstan
57 kg	Talgat Issabayev; Kazakhstan	Remzi Musaoğlu; Turkey	Sergei Chickine; Ukraine
62 kg	İsmail Faikoğlu; Turkey	Hüseyin Öztürk; Turkey	Farzad Pashaei; Iran
68 kg	Young-Ho Ko; South Korea	Kenyebek Omuraliev; Kyrgyzstan	Roman Motrovich; Ukraine
74 kg	Park Jang Soon; South Korea	Turan Ceylan; Turkey	Victor Peicov; Moldova
82 kg	Sebahatttin Öztürk; Turkey	László Dvorák; Hungary	Djando Modosian; Georgia
90 kg	Eldar Kurtanidze; Georgia	Ahmet Doğu; Turkey	Islam Bairamukov; Kazakhstan
100 kg	Andre Glafko; Russia	Marek Garmolovicz; Poland	Milan Mazáč; Slovakia
130 kg	Sezgin Ayık; Turkey	Mahmut Demir; Turkey	İ. Tachobitko; Ukraine

== Participating nations ==
- Turkey
- Kazakhstan
- South Korea
- Ukraine
- Georgia
- Iran
- Hungary
- Moldova
- Kyrgyzstan
- Romania
- Slovakia
- Russia
- Poland
- Bulgaria
- Azerbaijan
- Italy
- Turkmenistan
