= 1991 Yasar Dogu Tournament =

Yasar Dogu 1991
- Host city: Istanbul, Turkey
- Dates: 15–17 February 1991

The Yasar Dogu Tournament 1991, was a wrestling event held in Istanbul, Turkey between 15 and 17 January 1991. This tournament was held as 19th.

This international tournament includes competition includes competition in men's freestyle wrestling. This ranking tournament was held in honor of the two time Olympic Champion, Yaşar Doğu.

== Medal table ==
Rank	Nation	Gold	Silver	Bronze	Total
1	Turkey	10	4	5	19
2	Bulgaria	0	2	3	5
3	Soviet Union	0	2	1	3
4	Romania	0	1	1	2
5	Hungary	0	1	0	1
Totals (5 entries)		10	10	10	30

== Medal overview ==
=== Men's freestyle ===
Event	Gold	Silver	Bronze
48 kg	İlyas Şükrüoğlu; Turkey	Romica Rasovan; Romania	Vugar Orudiev; Soviet Union
52 kg	Fikret Mutlu; Turkey	Ahmet Orel; Turkey	Constantin Corduneanu; Romania
57 kg	Remzi Musaoğlu; Turkey	Metin Topaktaş; Turkey	Ahmet Ak; Turkey
62 kg	Metin Kaplan; Turkey	Hüseyin Öztürk; Turkey	Rossen Vasiliev; Bulgaria
68 kg	Kamil Kocaağaoğlu; Turkey	Valentin Getzov; Bulgaria	Behçet Selimoğlu; Turkey
74 kg	Selahattin Yiğit; Turkey	Yaşar Kale; Turkey	Fatih Özbaş; Turkey
82 kg	Mehmet Turkaya; Turkey	Aleksander Savko; Soviet Union	Veselin Sabev; Bulgaria
90 kg	Efraim Kamberoğlu; Turkey	Sergey Smal; Soviet Union	Tanyo Pehlivanov; Bulgaria
100 kg	Ali Kayalı; Turkey	Sándor Kiss; Hungary	Mahmut Demir; Turkey
130 kg	Sezgin Ayık; Turkey	Kiril Barbutov; Bulgaria	Zekeriya Güçlü; Turkey

== Participating nations ==
- Turkey
- Bulgaria
- Romania
- Soviet Union
- Hungary
- Yugoslavia
