= 1997 Yasar Dogu Tournament =

Wrestling event in Turkey

Yasar Dogu 1997
- Host city: Ankara, Turkey
- Dates: 14–16 February 1997

The Yasar Dogu Tournament 1997, was a wrestling event held in Ankara, Turkey between 14 and 16 February 1997. This tournament was held as 25th.

This international tournament includes competition includes competition in men's freestyle wrestling. This ranking tournament was held in honor of the two time Olympic Champion, Yaşar Doğu.

== Medal table ==
Rank	Nation	Gold	Silver	Bronze	Total
1	Turkey	4	3	4	11
2	United States	4	1	1	6
3	Russia	0	2	1	3
4	Mongolia	0	1	0	1
4	Ukraine	0	1	0	1
6	Hungary	0	0	1	1
6	Kazakhstan	0	0	1	1
Totals (7 entries)		8	8	8	24

== Medal overview ==
=== Men's freestyle ===
Event	Gold	Silver	Bronze
54 kg	Sammie Henson; United States	Zuunbayan Tumendemberel; Mongolia	Murad Ramazanov; Russia
58 kg	Harun Doğan; Turkey	İsmail Zurnacı; Turkey	Fikret Aker; Turkey
63 kg	Shawn Charles; United States	Andre Fokovlev; Russia	Muharrem Demireğen; Turkey
69 kg	Yüksel Şanlı; Turkey	John Guria; United States	Adem Kaya; Turkey
76 kg	Nuri Zengin; Turkey	Sedat Dumlu; Turkey	Steve Marianetti; United States
85 kg	Kevin Jackson; United States	Eldar Assanov; Ukraine	Ali Rıza Keser; Turkey
97 kg	Melvin Douglas; United States	Aleksandr Shemalov; Russia	Islam Bairamukov; Kazakhstan
125 kg	Zekeriya Güçlü; Turkey	Aydın Polatçı; Turkey	Zsolt Gombos; Hungary

== Participating nations ==
- Turkey
- Russia
- United States
- Ukraine
- Mongolia
- Kazakhstan
- Hungary
- Poland
- Georgia
- Switzerland
- Italy
- China
- France
- Uzbekistan
- Syria
- Tunisia
- Macedonia
