= 2004 Yasar Dogu Tournament =

Yasar Dogu 2004
- Host city: Ankara, Turkey
- Dates: 12–14 March
- Stadium: Ataturk Sports Complex

The Yasar Dogu Tournament 2004, was a wrestling event held in Ankara, Turkey between 12 and 14 March 2004. This tournament was held as 32nd.

This international tournament includes competition includes competition in men's freestyle wrestling. This ranking tournament was held in honor of the two time Olympic Champion, Yaşar Doğu.

== Medal table ==
Rank	Nation	Gold	Silver	Bronze	Total
1	Turkey	3	6	1	10
2	Ukraine	2	0	1	3
3	South Korea	1	1	0	2
4	Russia	1	0	0	1
5	Bulgaria	0	0	2	2
5	Japan	0	0	2	2
7	Mongolia	0	0	1	1
Totals (7 entries)		7	7	7	21

== Medal overview ==
=== Men's freestyle ===
Event	Gold	Silver	Bronze
55 kg	Oleksedi Zasharuk; Ukraine	Nyo Sub Kim; South Korea	Chikara Tanabe; Japan
60 kg	Ho Jung Ywang; South Korea	Tevfik Odabaşı; Turkey	Harun Doğan; Turkey
66 kg	Makhach Murtazaliev; Russia	Levent Kaleli; Turkey	Ilımatsu Kazuhıko; Japan
74 kg	Ahmet Gülhan; Turkey	Fahrettin Özata; Turkey	Nikolay Paslar; Bulgaria
84 kg	Oleg Kushnir; Ukraine	Gökhan Yavaşer; Turkey	Alk Muzeyete; Ukraine
96 kg	Fatih Çakıroğlu; Turkey	Sait Bingöl; Turkey	Krasimir Kochev; Bulgaria
120 kg	Aydın Polatçı; Turkey	Kaşif Şakiroğlu; Turkey	Usukhbayar Gelegjamts; Mongolia

== Participating nations ==
- Turkey
- Ukraine
- Greece
- Bulgaria
- Mongolia
- Georgia
- Iran
- Kazakhstan
- Russia
- Japan
- Azerbaijan
- Moldova
- Kyrgyzstan
- Hungary
- Italy
