= 2003 Yasar Dogu Tournament =

Yasar Dogu 2003
- Host city: Ankara, Turkey
- Dates: 28 February – 2 March 2003
- Stadium: Ataturk Sports Complex

The Yasar Dogu Tournament 2003, was a wrestling event held in Ankara, Turkey between 28 February and 2 March 2003. This tournament was held as 31st.

This international tournament includes competition includes competition in men's freestyle wrestling. This ranking tournament was held in honor of the two time Olympic Champion, Yaşar Doğu.

== Medal table ==
Rank	Nation	Gold	Silver	Bronze	Total
1	Turkey	3	2	2	7
2	Georgia	1	1	1	3
3	Iran	1	0	2	3
4	Tajikistan	1	0	0	1
5	Bulgaria	0	1	0	1
5	Greece	0	1	0	1
5	Russia	0	1	0	1
8	Hungary	0	0	1	1
Totals (8 entries)		6	6	6	18

== Medal overview ==
=== Men's freestyle ===
Event	Gold	Silver	Bronze
60 kg	Arif Kama; Turkey	Bezik Aslanasvili; Greece	David Pogosyan; Georgia
66 kg	Hassan Tahmassi; Iran	Ömer Çubukçu; Turkey	Hassan Aryan; Iran
74 kg	Yusuf Abdus lavo Tajikistan	Ivan Todorov; Bulgaria	Adem Bereket; Turkey
84 kg	Revaz Mindorashvili; Georgia	Adam Saitiev; Russia	Árpád Ritter; Hungary
96 kg	Fatih Çakıroğlu; Turkey	Hakan Koç; Turkey	Ramazan Yarar; Turkey
120 kg	Aydın Polatçı; Turkey	Alexander Modebadze; Georgia	Fardin Masoumi; Iran

== Participating nations ==
- Turkey
- Azerbaijan
- Algeria
- Bulgaria
- Mongolia
- Georgia
- Greece
- Hungary
- Iran
- Poland
- Russia
- Tajikistan
- Tunisia
