= Chen Xingqiang =

Chinese sport wrestler

Personal information
- Full name: Chen Xingqiang
- Nationality: China
- Born: 12 September 1972 (age 53) Sichuan, China
- Height: 1.90 m (6 ft 3 in)
- Weight: 125 kg (276 lb)

Sport
- Style: Freestyle
- Club: Sichuan Wrestling Club
- Coach: Bu Long
Medal record
Men's freestyle wrestling
Representing China
Asian Championships
Silver medal – second place	2000 Guilin	130 kg
Bronze medal – third place	1999 Tashkent	130 kg
Bronze medal – third place	2001 Ulan Bator	130 kg

Chen Xingqiang (Chinese: 陈兴强; pinyin: Chén Xìngqiáng; born September 12, 1972) is a Chinese former amateur freestyle wrestler, who competed in the men's super heavyweight category. He won three medals (a silver and two bronze) in his signature weight division at the Asian Championships (1999 to 2001) and eventually wrestled for the Chinese squad at the 2000 Summer Olympics in Sydney. Throughout his sporting career, Chen trained at a local wrestling club in Sichuan Province under his personal coach Bu Long.

Chen qualified for the Chinese wrestling squad in the men's super heavyweight class (130 kg) at the 2000 Summer Olympics in Sydney. Nearly six months earlier, he secured a berth with a runner-up finish at the final match of the fifth Olympic Qualification Tournament in Alexandria, Egypt, bowing out to Uzbekistan's Artur Taymazov for gold. Chen lost two straight matches each to Kyrgyzstan's Aleksandr Kovalevsky (2–4) and 1996 silver medalist Aleksey Medvedev of Belarus (0–3), slipping him out of the prelim pool to last place and fourteenth overall.
