= 1990 European Espoirs Wrestling Championships =

- Host city: Finland, Helsinki
- Dates: 1990

The 1990 European Espoirs Wrestling Championships was the 10th edition of European Espoirs Wrestling Championships was held 1990 in Helsinki, Finland.

== Medal table ==
| Rank | Nation | Gold | Silver | Bronze | Total |
|---|---|---|---|---|---|
| 1 | Soviet Union | 13 | 2 | 3 | 18 |
| 2 | Bulgaria | 1 | 6 | 3 | 10 |
| 3 | Turkey | 1 | 1 | 3 | 5 |
| 4 | Romania | 1 | 1 | 2 | 4 |
| 5 | East Germany | 1 | 0 | 1 | 2 |
| 6 | Sweden | 1 | 0 | 0 | 1 |
| 6 | West Germany | 1 | 0 | 0 | 1 |
| 8 | Hungary | 0 | 3 | 5 | 8 |
| 9 | Finland | 0 | 3 | 0 | 3 |
| 10 | Poland | 0 | 1 | 1 | 2 |
| 10 | Yugoslavia | 0 | 1 | 1 | 2 |
| 12 | Czechoslovakia | 0 | 1 | 0 | 1 |
| 12 | Italy | 0 | 1 | 0 | 1 |
| 14 | France | 0 | 0 | 1 | 1 |
| Totals (14 entries) | | 19 | 20 | 20 | 59 |

== Medal summary ==
=== Men's freestyle ===
| Event | Gold | Silver | Bronze |
|---|---|---|---|
| 48 kg | Vugar Orudiev; Soviet Union | Neven Alexiev; Bulgaria | Gabriel Lupu; Romania |
| 52 kg | Mavlud Karaibragimov; Soviet Union | Rumen Hristov; Bulgaria | Mustafa Çetin; Turkey |
| 57 kg | | Mustafa Syla; Yugoslavia | Tadeusz Kowalski; Poland |
| 62 kg | Yordan Denev; Bulgaria | Roman Motrovich; Soviet Union | Muharrem Demireğen; Turkey |
| 68 kg | Georgi Shintshikashvili; Soviet Union | Zvetelin Vasilev; Bulgaria | Fatih Özbaş; Turkey |
| 74 kg | Andre Backhaus; East Germany | Istvan Meszaros; Hungary | Valery Gabeev; Soviet Union |
| 82 kg | Yaroslav Basilyuk; Soviet Union | Sorin Moisache; Romania | Istvan Iringyi; Hungary |
| 90 kg | Witali Perfiljew; Soviet Union | Tanyu Pekhlivanov; Bulgaria | William Rombouts; France |
| 100 kg | Mahmut Demir; Turkey | Pal Kaliszki; Hungary | Davud Məhəmmədov; Soviet Union |
| 130 kg | Andrey Shumilin; Soviet Union | Ömer Aslantaş; Turkey | Georgi Khristov; Bulgaria |

=== Men's Greco-Roman ===
| Event | Gold | Silver | Bronze |
|---|---|---|---|
| 48 kg | Iliuță Dăscălescu; Romania | Francesco Costantino; Italy | Natig Eyvazov; Soviet Union |
| 52 kg | Alfred Ter‑Mkrtchyan; Soviet Union | Ismo Kamesaki; Finland | Valentin Rebega; Romania |
| 57 kg | Boris Ambartsumov; Soviet Union | Ari Härkänen; Finland | Ivailo Mladenov; Bulgaria |
| 62 kg | Vardan Margaryan; Soviet Union | Georgi Iliev; Bulgaria | Vojislav Matic; Yugoslavia |
| 68 kg | Thomas Reinshagen; West Germany | Robert Zotkowski; Poland | Stoitscho Kubatov; Bulgaria |
| 74 kg | Arkadi Krajni; Soviet Union | Michael Lyyski; Finland | Laszlo Vizi; Hungary |
| 82 kg | Tsolak Yeghishyan; Soviet Union | Frantisek Lengyel; Czechoslovakia | Gabor Garamvolgyi; Hungary |
| 90 kg | Mikael Ljungberg; Sweden | Vladimir Proshtaligin; Soviet Union | Péter Bacsa; Hungary |
| 100 kg | Oleg Parschin; Soviet Union | Daniel Tenov; Bulgaria | Rajos István; Hungary |
| 130 kg | Sergei Mureiko; Soviet Union | Zoltan Mucsi; Hungary | Frank Stuebner; East Germany |
