= Fatih Çakıroğlu =

Turkish freestyle wrestler

Personal information
- Born: April 14, 1981 (age 45) Istanbul, Turkey
- Height: 1.90 m (6 ft 3 in)
- Weight: 112 kg (247 lb; 17.6 st)

Sport
- Country: Turkey
- Sport: Amateur wrestling
- Event: Freestyle
- Club: İBB Spor Club
Medal record
Men's freestyle wrestling
Representing Turkey
European Championships
Gold medal – first place	2011 Dortmund	120 kg
Silver medal – second place	2010 Baku	120 kg
Silver medal – second place	2003 Riga	96 kg
Bronze medal – third place	2007 Sofia	120 kg
Bronze medal – third place	2005 Varna	96 kg
Bronze medal – third place	2002 Baku	96 kg
Mediterranean Games
Gold medal – first place	2009 Pescara	120 kg
World Military Games
Gold medal – first place	2005 Vilnius	120 kg
Yasar Dogu Tournament
Gold medal – first place	2011 Istanbul	120 kg
Gold medal – first place	2007 Ankara	120 kg
Gold medal – first place	2005 Samsun	96 kg
Gold medal – first place	2004 Ankara	96 kg
Gold medal – first place	2003 Ankara	96 kg
Gold medal – first place	2002 Ankara	96 kg
Golden Grand Prix
Gold medal – first place	2011 Baku	120 kg
Mediterranean Championship
Gold medal – first place	2010 Istanbul	120 kg

Fatih Çakıroğlu (born April 14, 1981, in Istanbul), is a Turkish European champion Turkish freestyle wrestler competing in the 125 kg division.

Çakıroğlu graduated from the Ondokuz Mayıs University in Samsun with a degree in Physical Education and Sports.

== Career ==
- 2002 European Championships - Bronze
- 2004 Olympics in Athens, Greece - 9th place (96 kg)
- 2006 International Golden Grand Prix in Baku, Azerbaijan - (96 kg)
- 2007 European Championships in Sofia, Bulgaria - Bronze
- 2007 World Championships in Baku, Azerbaijan - 5th place (120 kg)
- 2008 International Alexander Medved Tournament in Minsk, Belarus - Silver (120 kg)
- 2009 Mediterranean Games in Pescara, Italy - Gold (120 kg)
- 2010 European Championships in Baku, Azerbaijan - Silver (120 kg)
- 2010 International Golden Grand Prix in Baku, Azerbaijan - Gold (120 kg)
- 2010 World Championships in Moscow, Russia - lost in the 2nd round (120 kg)
- 2011 European Championships in Dortmund, Germany - Gold (120 kg)
