= Teague Moore =

American wrestler and coach (born 1976)

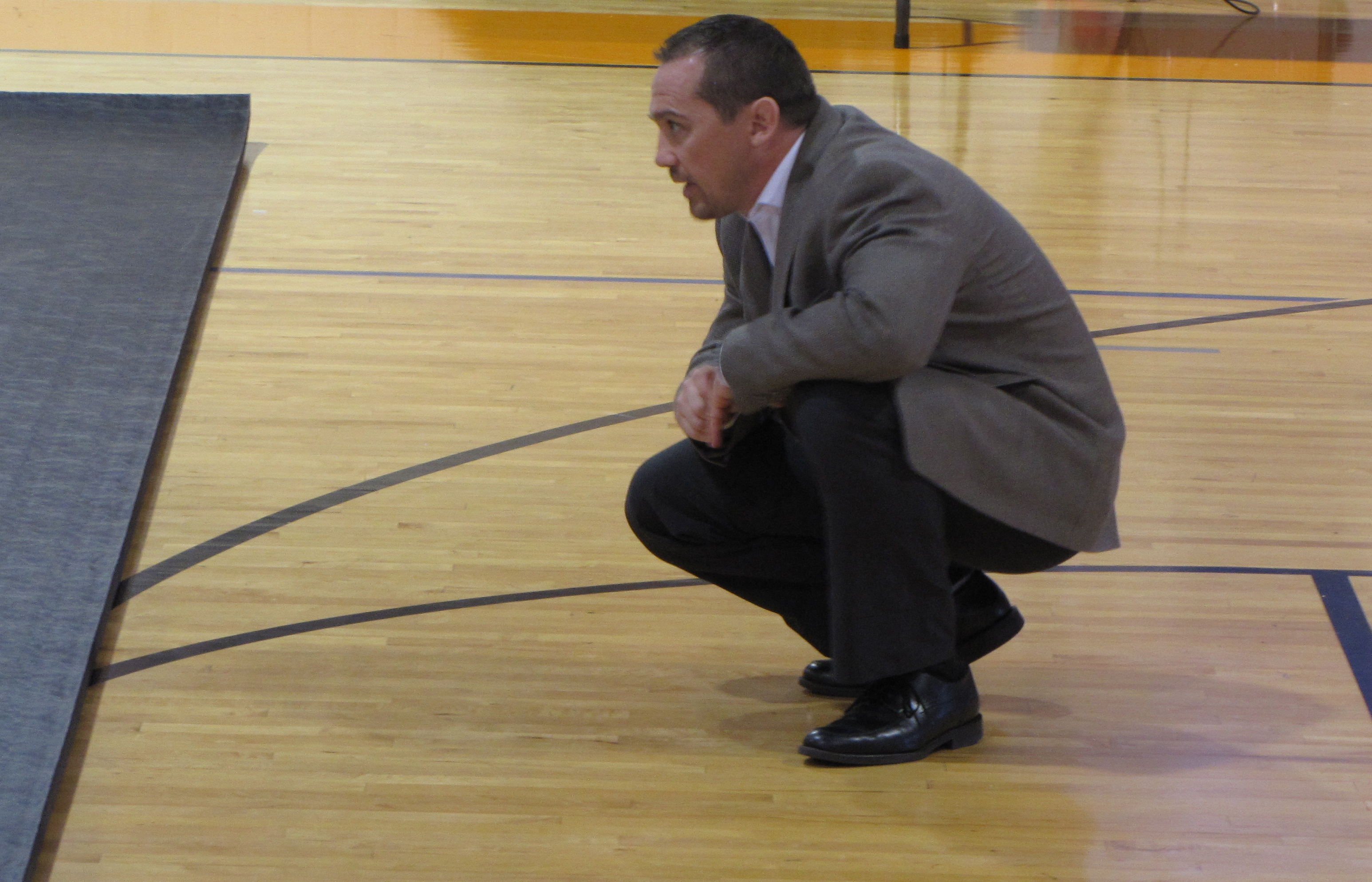
- Moore coaching during dual meet in 2015

Personal information
- Born: March 24, 1976 (age 50) Pittsburgh, Pennsylvania, U.S.

Sport
- Country: United States
- Sport: Wrestling
- Events: Freestyle and Folkstyle
- College team: Oklahoma State
- Coached by: John Smith
Medal record
Men's freestyle wrestling
Representing the United States
University World Championships
Gold medal – first place	2000 Tokyo	54 kg
Yaşar Doğu Tournament
Gold medal – first place	2002 Ankara	55 kg
Collegiate Wrestling
Representing the Oklahoma State Cowboys
NCAA Division I Championships
Gold medal – first place	1998 Cleveland	118 lb
Bronze medal – third place	1999 State College	125 lb
Big 12 Championships
Gold medal – first place	1997 Columbia	118 lb
Gold medal – first place	1998 Norman	118 lb
Silver medal – second place	1999 Ames	125 lb

Teague Moore (born March 24, 1976) is an American former wrestler and wrestling coach.

As an athlete, he is known for winning the 1998 NCAA Championship while at Oklahoma State University.

Following assistant coaching stints at Pittsburgh, Oklahoma, Oklahoma State, and Harvard, Moore began his head coaching career at NCAA Division I wrestling program Clarion University of Pennsylvania where he was named PSAC Coach of the Year, before becoming the head coach at American University. Moore led the American University wrestling program for nine seasons, producing five All-Americans, 32 NCAA qualifiers, and 47 EIWA place-winners before departing in 2021.

Influenced by his coaching experience at Harvard, Moore emphasized both athletic and academic excellence in his coaching. He recruited student-athletes committed to national-level wrestling and academic achievement, citing academic improvement as a key component of Clarion's resurgence, noting that the program focused on raising its NCAA APR standing before fully concentrating on competitive success. His teams at American University consistently ranked among the nation's top NCAA Division I wrestling teams in grade-point average.

In 2009, Moore was inducted into the Pennsylvania Wrestling Coaches Association Hall of Fame.

Moore has been attributed with the creation of the First2Ten rule system used by the Association of Career Wrestlers in Tour ACW events.

== Competition ==
=== High School ===
Moore attended North Allegheny Senior High School, where he earned All-State honors three times and reached the PIAA state finals twice, finishing as runner-up before winning the state championship in 1995. In 2005, InterMat included Moore among its list of the 20 best high school wrestlers of the previous 20 years. He also won three Junior Freestyle National Championships and an NHSCA Senior National Championship.

=== College ===
After high school graduation, Moore attended Oklahoma State University, where he was a three-time Big 12 finalist, winning conference titles in 1997 and 1998. He was also a four-time NCAA qualifier and three-time NCAA All-American, placing fourth at the NCAA Championships in 1997, winning the 118-pound national title in 1998, and finishing third in 1999.

At the 1998 NCAA Championships, Moore won the 118-pound Division I national championship by pinning David Morgan of Michigan State in the finals.

=== International ===
Following his collegiate career, Moore competed internationally in freestyle wrestling. In 2000, he won the University Freestyle National Championships at 54 kg, defeating Stephen Abas in the finals and earning Outstanding Wrestler honors. Later that year, he captured the gold medal at the World University Wrestling Championships in Tokyo, Japan, helping lead the United States to the team title. Moore also placed third at the 2000 U.S. Olympic Team Trials, earning a spot on the U.S. National Team.

Moore represented the United States at the 2001 Freestyle Wrestling World Cup in Baltimore, Maryland.

In 2002, he won the Manitoba Open in Canada, including a victory over Olympic silver medalist Sammie Henson. The following month, he won the 55 kg title at the 2002 Yasar Dogu International Open in Ankara, Turkey, defeating Japan's 2008 Olympic Silver Medalist Tomihiro Matsunaga in the championship match. Later that year, he won the U.S. National Championships at 55 kg by defeating Jody Strittmatter in the finals. He subsequently finished runner-up at the U.S. World Team Trials.

In 2003, Moore won a silver medal at the Freestyle Wrestling World Cup in Boise, Idaho, competing for the World Select team and recording a victory over Russia's Alexander Kontoev, a 2001 World Championship bronze medalist.

During the 2004 season, he earned a silver medal at the Ulan Ude International Tournament, an event commonly referred to in Russia as the Buryatia Republic President's Cup. According to USA Wrestling, tournament organizers altered the schedule so that Moore's championship bout against Dodupov Zhargal of Buryatia would conclude the event, showcasing the popular local wrestler. U.S. coach John Peterson later described Zhargal's 3–2 victory as controversial. Zhargal was subsequently named the tournament's Outstanding Wrestler. Later that year, Moore placed third at the 2004 U.S. Olympic Team Trials in Indianapolis, Indiana.

=== Professional ===
Moore took 2nd place in the Real Pro Wrestling series, losing to 2000 Olympic Silver Medalist and 1997 World Champion, Sammie Henson.

== Coach ==
=== History ===
University	Position	Start year	End year	Accomplishment
University of Pittsburgh	Assistant Coach	2000	2001	X
University of Oklahoma	Assistant Coach	2002	2003	*2003 NCAA 3rd Place; *2003 BIG XII 3rd Place; *2003 University Nationals 2nd Place; *2002 NCAA 3rd Place; *2002 BIG XII Team Champions
Oklahoma State University	Assistant Coach	2003	2004	*2004 NCAA Team Champions; *2004 BIG XII Team Champions; *2004 National Duals Team Champions
Harvard University	Assistant Coach	2005	2006	*2 EIWA Champions; *4 EIWA Finalists
Clarion University	Head coach	2006	2011	*8 NCAA Qualifiers; *2011 EWL Outstanding Wrestler; *2011 PSAC Outstanding Wrestler; *1 EWL Champion; *5 PSAC Champions; *2010 PSAC Team Champions; *2011 PSAC Wrestling 'Coach of the Year'
American University	Head coach	2011	01/2021	*2 NCAA All-Americans; *5 NCAA Qualifiers; *2 National Collegiate Open All-Americans *#7 NWMA Mid-Major Dual Poll
