= 1998 Yasar Dogu Tournament =

Yasar Dogu 1998
- Host city: Ankara, Turkey
- Dates: 27 February – 1 March 1998

The Yasar Dogu Tournament 1998, was a wrestling event held in Ankara, Turkey between 27 February and 1 March 1998. This tournament was held as 26th.

This international tournament includes competition includes competition in men's freestyle wrestling. This ranking tournament was held in honor of the two time Olympic Champion, Yaşar Doğu.

== Medal table ==
| Rank | Nation | Gold | Silver | Bronze | Total |
|---|---|---|---|---|---|
| 1 | Turkey | 5 | 1 | 1 | 7 |
| 2 | United States | 2 | 1 | 1 | 4 |
| 3 | Russia | 1 | 3 | 3 | 7 |
| 4 | Iran | 0 | 1 | 1 | 2 |
| 5 | Kazakhstan | 0 | 1 | 0 | 1 |
| 5 | Mongolia | 0 | 1 | 0 | 1 |
| 7 | Hungary | 0 | 0 | 1 | 1 |
| 7 | Poland | 0 | 0 | 1 | 1 |
| Totals (8 entries) | | 8 | 8 | 8 | 24 |

== Medal overview ==
=== Men's freestyle ===
| Event | Gold | Silver | Bronze |
|---|---|---|---|
| 54 kg | Mevlana Kulaç; Turkey | Maulon Mamirov; Kazakhstan | Leonid Thauthonov; Russia |
| 58 kg | Harun Doğan; Turkey | Purevbaatar Oyunbuleg; Mongolia | Ali Ganjabi; Iran |
| 63 kg | Cary Kolat; United States | Alexander Soloviev; Russia | Takahiro Wada; Japan |
| 69 kg | Terry Steiner; United States | Ourusov Taimazov; Russia | Yüksel Şanlı; Turkey |
| 76 kg | Nuri Zengin; Turkey | Samil Aliev; Russia | Péter Árpád; Hungary |
| 85 kg | Ali Özen; Turkey | Abbas Mejidi; Iran | Koupninkov; Russia |
| 97 kg | Sait Murtazaaliev; Russia | Kenan Şimşek; Turkey | Marek Garmulovicz; Poland |
| 125 kg | Aydın Polatçı; Turkey | Tom Erikson; United States | Alexander Kovalevski; Russia |

== Participating nations ==
- Turkey
- Russia
- United States
- Iran
- Mongolia
- Kazakhstan
- Japan
- Hungary
- Poland
- Lithuania
- Slovakia
- Georgia
- Ukraine
