= Kavak, Samsun =

Kavak
- District and municipality
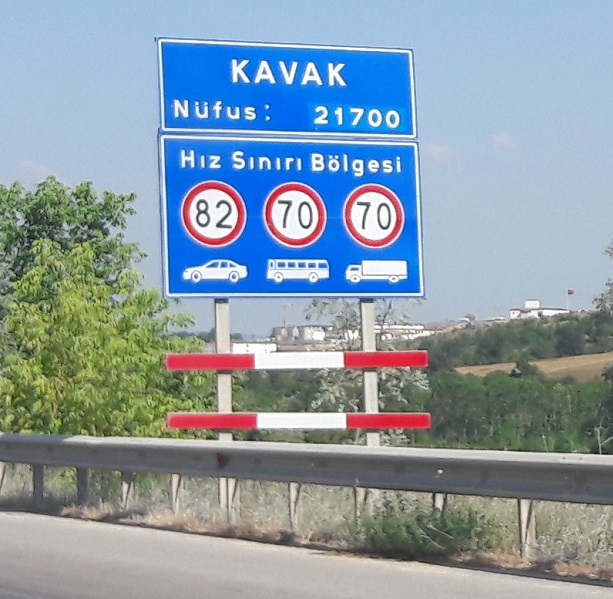

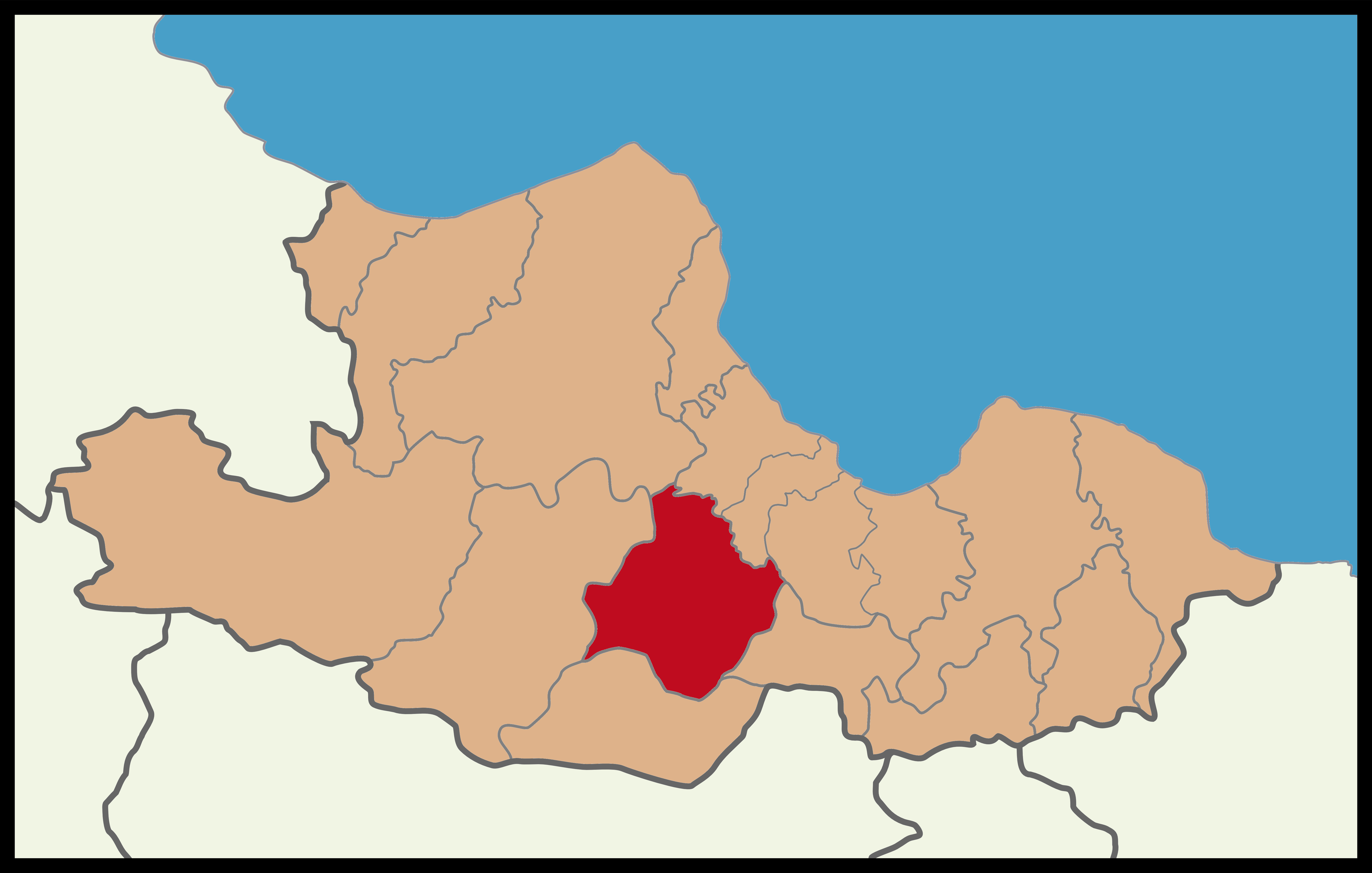
- Map showing Kavak District in Samsun Province

- Location within Turkey
- Coordinates: 41°04′25″N 36°02′25″E
- Country: Turkey
- Province: Samsun

Government
  - Mayor: Şerif Ün (YRP)
- Area: 697 km^{2} (269 sq mi)
- Population (2022): 22,747
  - Density: 32.6/km^{2} (84.5/sq mi)
- Time zone: UTC+3 (TRT)
- Area code: 0362
- Climate: Csb
- Website: www.samsunkavak.bel.tr

Kavak is a municipality and district of Samsun Province, Turkey. Its area is 697 km^{2}, and its population is 22,747 (2022). Kavak is located 51 km away from Samsun. It has 600 m height from the sea level. The mayor is Şerif Ün (YRP).

Kavak is located on the Samsun-Ankara highway, which brings it economical and social advantages. The most important source of income for Kavak is chicken farms. Yaşar Doğu - Olympic gold medalist sports wrestler was born in Kavak district.

== Composition ==
There are 91 neighbourhoods in Kavak District:

- 19 Mayıs
- Ağcakese
- Ahırlı
- Akbelen
- Alaçam
- Alagömlek
- Aşağıçirişli
- Atayurt
- Azaklı
- Bahçelievler
- Başalan
- Bayındır
- Bayraklı
- Bekdemir
- Belalan
- Beybesli
- Beyköy
- Boğaziçi
- Bükceğiz
- Büyükçukur
- Çakallı
- Çalbaşı
- Çarıklıbaşı
- Çataltepe
- Çayırlı
- Celalli
- Çiçekyazı
- Çiğdem
- Çivril
- Çukurbük
- Değirmencili
- Demirci
- Dereköy
- Divanbaşı
- Doruk
- Duman
- Dura
- Emirli
- Germiyan
- Göçebe
- Güneyce
- Hacılı
- İdrisli
- İkizdere
- Ilıcaköy
- Kapıhayat
- Karacaarslan
- Karacalar
- Karadağ
- Karantı
- Karapınar
- Karayusuflu
- Karlı
- Kartepe
- Kayabaşı
- Kayaköy
- Kazancı
- Kethuda
- Köseli
- Kozansıkı
- Küçükçukur
- Kurşunlu
- Kuzalan
- Mahmutbeyli
- Mahmutlu
- Mehmetpaşa
- Mert
- Muhsinli
- Muratbeyli
- Ortaköy
- Sarıalan
- Şeyhli
- Şeyhresul
- Seyitali
- Sıralı
- Soğuksu
- Susuz
- Tabaklı
- Talışman
- Tatarmuslu
- Tekkeköy
- Tepecik
- Toptepe
- Üçhanlar
- Yaşardoğu
- Yenicami
- Yenigün
- Yeralan
- Yosunlu
- Yukarı Dereköy
- Yukarıçirişli
