= 1997 World Wrestling Championships – Men's freestyle 97 kg =

Men's freestyle 97 kg at the 1997 World Championships
- Venue: Yenisey Sports Palace
- Dates: 28–30 August 1997
- Competitors: 23 from 23 nations

Medalists
gold medal	Kuramagomed Kuramagomedov	Russia
silver medal	Ahmet Doğu	Turkey
bronze medal	Eldar Kurtanidze	Georgia

The men's freestyle 97 kilograms is a competition featured at the 1997 World Wrestling Championships, and was held at the Yenisey Sports Palace in Krasnoyarsk, Russia from 28 to 30 August 1997.

== Results ==
Legend

- WO — Won by walkover

=== Round 1 ===
	Score	
Round of 32
Bayanmönkhiin Gantogtokh (MGL)	2–3	Kuramagomed Kuramagomedov (RUS)
Islam Bayramukov (KAZ)	2–5	Arawat Sabejew (GER)
Marek Garmulewicz (POL)	6–0 Fall	Hiroshi Kosuge (JPN)
Viktor Serbin (BLR)	1–3	Serhii Priadun (UKR)
Aftantil Xanthopoulos (GRE)	2–1	Melvin Douglas (USA)
Eldar Kurtanidze (GEO)	2–0	Davud Magomedov (AZE)
Dries van Leeuwen (NED)	0–10	Abdolreza Kargar (IRI)
José Marín (VEN)	0–3 Fall	Konstantin Aleksandrov (KGZ)
Gong Xun (CHN)	0–6	Jurijs Janovičs (LAT)
Ahmet Doğu (TUR)	10–2	Mushtaq Abdullah (AUS)
Wilfredo Morales (CUB)	6–0	Peter Guterson (CAN)
Kim Tae-ho (KOR)		Bye

=== Round 2 ===
	Score	
Round of 16
Kim Tae-ho (KOR)	0–4	Kuramagomed Kuramagomedov (RUS)
Arawat Sabejew (GER)	3–0	Marek Garmulewicz (POL)
Serhii Priadun (UKR)	4–0	Aftantil Xanthopoulos (GRE)
Eldar Kurtanidze (GEO)	6–0	Abdolreza Kargar (IRI)
Konstantin Aleksandrov (KGZ)	2–3	Jurijs Janovičs (LAT)
Ahmet Doğu (TUR)	3–1	Wilfredo Morales (CUB)
Repechage
Bayanmönkhiin Gantogtokh (MGL)	2–5	Islam Bayramukov (KAZ)
Hiroshi Kosuge (JPN)	WO	Viktor Serbin (BLR)
Melvin Douglas (USA)	3–2	Davud Magomedov (AZE)
Dries van Leeuwen (NED)	6–1	José Marín (VEN)
Gong Xun (CHN)	6–2	Mushtaq Abdullah (AUS)
Peter Guterson (CAN)		Bye

=== Round 3 ===
	Score	
Quarterfinals
Kuramagomed Kuramagomedov (RUS)	2–1	Arawat Sabejew (GER)
Serhii Priadun (UKR)	3–1 Fall	Eldar Kurtanidze (GEO)
Jurijs Janovičs (LAT)		Bye
Ahmet Doğu (TUR)		Bye
Repechage
Peter Guterson (CAN)	0–10	Islam Bayramukov (KAZ)
Viktor Serbin (BLR)	1–5	Melvin Douglas (USA)
Dries van Leeuwen (NED)	2–9	Gong Xun (CHN)
Kim Tae-ho (KOR)	0–5 Fall	Marek Garmulewicz (POL)
Aftantil Xanthopoulos (GRE)	3–1 Fall	Abdolreza Kargar (IRI)
Konstantin Aleksandrov (KGZ)	0–0	Wilfredo Morales (CUB)

=== Round 4 ===
	Score	
Semifinals
Kuramagomed Kuramagomedov (RUS)	5–1	Serhii Priadun (UKR)
Jurijs Janovičs (LAT)	0–1	Ahmet Doğu (TUR)
Repechage
Islam Bayramukov (KAZ)	3–2	Melvin Douglas (USA)
Gong Xun (CHN)	0–6 Fall	Marek Garmulewicz (POL)
Aftantil Xanthopoulos (GRE)	1–3	Wilfredo Morales (CUB)
Arawat Sabejew (GER)	1–5	Eldar Kurtanidze (GEO)

=== Round 5 ===
	Score	
Repechage
Islam Bayramukov (KAZ)	3–2	Marek Garmulewicz (POL)
Wilfredo Morales (CUB)	0–1	Eldar Kurtanidze (GEO)

=== Round 6 ===
	Score	
Repechage
Serhii Priadun (UKR)	0–5	Islam Bayramukov (KAZ)
Eldar Kurtanidze (GEO)	WO	Jurijs Janovičs (LAT)

=== Finals ===
	Score	
5th place match
Serhii Priadun (UKR)	WO	Jurijs Janovičs (LAT)
Bronze medal match
Islam Bayramukov (KAZ)	0–7	Eldar Kurtanidze (GEO)
Final
Kuramagomed Kuramagomedov (RUS)	5–0	Ahmet Doğu (TUR)
