= Egiya Vagramovich Musoyan =

Sovet freestyle wrestler (1966)

Egiya Musoyan
Personal information
- Nationality: USSR
- Born: 1966 (age 59–60)

Sport
- Sport: Freestyle wrestling
Medal record
Men's freestyle wrestling
Representing Soviet Union
Espoir World Championships
Gold medal – first place	1985 Colorado Springs	57 kg
Espoir European Championships
Gold medal – first place	1986 Lidkoeping	57 kg
World Junior Championships
Gold medal – first place	1983 Oak Lawn	52 kg

Egiya Vagramovich Musoyan (born 16 January 1966) is a retired Soviet freestyle wrestler.

At the 1983 USSR Senior Championships Musoyan won the bronze medal in the 52 kg event. He also received silver medal in the 52 kg event at the 1983 USSR Peoples Spartakiad after losing to current USSR National Champion Rakhim Novruzov by criteria with the tied score of 3-3 in the final.

Musoyan won the gold medal in the 52 kg event at the 1983 World Junior Championships, by defeating Corey Baze in the final.

He won the bronze medal at the 1984 European Junior Championships in the 56 kg event.

Musoyan won the gold medal in the 57 kg event at the 1985 USSR Senior Cup.

He took the 1985 U-20 Wrestling World Championships in the Prospect Youth category, known as Espoir, winning the gold medal in the 57 kg event, by defeating Ahmet Ak in the final.

Musoyan also won the 1986 Espoir European Championships in the 57 kg event.
