= Alfredo Far =

Panamanian wrestler

Alfredo Far (born 25 May 1972) is a Panamanian former wrestler who competed in the 1996 Summer Olympics.
