= Mahmut Demir =

Turkish wrestler (born 1970)

Personal information
- Born: January 21, 1970 (age 56) Amasya, Turkey
- Height: 1.84 m (6 ft 0 in)
- Weight: 120 kg (265 lb)
Medal record
Men's freestyle wrestling
Representing Turkey
Olympic Games
Gold medal – first place	1996 Atlanta	130 kg
World Championships
Gold medal – first place	1994 Istanbul	130 kg
European Championships
Gold medal – first place	1993 Istanbul	130 kg
Gold medal – first place	1995 Fribourg	130 kg
Gold medal – first place	1996 Budapest	130 kg
Silver medal – second place	1992 Kaposvar	130 kg
Silver medal – second place	1994 Rome	130 kg
Bronze medal – third place	1990 Poznan	100 kg
Bronze medal – third place	1991 Stuttgart	130 kg
World Cup
Bronze medal – third place	1990 Toledo	130 kg
Bronze medal – third place	1995 Chattanooga	130 kg
Mediterranean Games
Gold medal – first place	1991 Athens	130 kg
Yasar Dogu Tournament
Gold medal – first place	1989 Istanbul	100 kg
Gold medal – first place	1992 Istanbul	130 kg
Gold medal – first place	1994 Istanbul	130 kg
Gold medal – first place	1996 Ankara	130 kg
Silver medal – second place	1993 Istanbul	130 kg
Bronze medal – third place	1991 Istanbul	100 kg
World Espoir Championships
Silver medal – second place	1989 Ulaanbaatar	100 kg
European Espoir Championships
Gold medal – first place	1990 Helsinki	100 kg
European Juniors Championships
Bronze medal – third place	1987 Katowice	115 kg
Balkan Juniors Championships
Gold medal – first place	1990 Sakarya	100 kg
Silver medal – second place	1986 Sombor	130 kg
Silver medal – second place	1987 Thessaloniki	130 kg

Mahmut Demir (21 January 1970 in Amasya, Turkey), is a Turkish Olympic, World and European champion former wrestler in the super heavyweight class. He won the gold medal at the 1996 Olympics in Men's Freestyle wrestling.

== Wrestling career ==
He was born on 21 January 1970 in Suluova district of Amasya Province in northern Turkey. Demir started wrestling in 1984. In a short time he developed into an excellent freestyle wrestler who soon moved to the top Turkish club "TEDAS" Ankara. At a height of 1.84 m, he soon grew into super heavyweight via heavyweight, usually weighing in at around 120 kg. His coaches were Alaattin Yıldırım and Nabi Bayram and national coach Yakup Topuz.

Demir started his international wrestling career at the age of 16 with a 2nd place at the Balkan Junior Championships in Sonbor. From 1986 to 1990 he then competed regularly at the Junior World and European Championships. In 1990, he won the title of European Junior Heavyweight Champion.

He made his senior debut with a 5th place in the heavyweight division at the 1989 World Championships in Martigny/Switzerland. He achieved this place with a 2:0 points victory over Sandor Kiss from Hungary. At the 1990 European Wrestling Championships in Poznan, Demir won his first senior medal with a 3rd place in the heavyweight category. In the fight for this bronze medal he defeated the junior world champion Heiko Balz from the German Democratic Republic.

In 1991 Demir won another bronze medal at the European Championships in Stuttgart, but this time in the super heavyweight division. In a preliminary round fight he suffered a shoulder defeat at the hands of the German champion Andreas Schröder.

In 1992, the year of the Olympics, Demir was runner-up in the European super heavyweight championship in Kaposvár. In the final he was again beaten by Andreas Schröder. At the Olympic Games in Barcelona, he narrowly missed out on a medal with a 4th place after losing to David Gobejishvili from The Unified Team and Jeff Thue from Canada.

Mahmut Demir's most successful years began after the 1992 Olympic Games. As early as 1993 he became European super heavyweight champion in Istanbul with a victory over Murabi Valiev from Ukraine. In 1994 he finished 2nd at the European Championships in Rome, this time behind Valiev, but was able to celebrate winning his first world title at the World Championships in Istanbul. In the final he defeated Olympic champion Bruce Baumgartner from the USA 1:0 on points.

In 1995 Demir won against Murabi Valiev in Freiburg and thus his second European Championship title. At the World Championships of the same year in Atlanta, he lost to Bruce Baumgartner and finished 5th.

The Olympic year 1996 was the highlight of Mahmut Demir's career. In the spring he became European champion for the third time in Budapest in superior style and won the gold medal at the Olympic Games in Atlanta. In the final he defeated Aleksey Medvedev from Belarus, the son of the Olympic champion Aleksandr Medved, 3:0 on points.

After this victory, Demir retired from active wrestling. He is now a businessman in Amasya. He is married and has with two children.

A sports hall in his hometown Suluova is named after him, where the 2006 European Champion Clubs Freestyle Wrestling Cup was held.

== Achievements ==
- 1986 Balkan Juniors Championship in Sombor, Yugoslavia - silver (130 kg)
- 1986 World Juniors Championship in Schifferstadt, FR Germany - 6th (100 kg)
- 1986 European Espoir Championship in Linköping, Sweden - 4th (100 kg)
- 1987 Balkan Juniors Championship in Thessaloniki, Greece - silver (130 kg)
- 1987 European Championship in Katowice, Poland - bronze (115 kg)
- 1988 European Espoir Championship in Wałbrzych, Poland - 5th (130 kg)
- 1988 European Juniors Championship in Constanţa, Romania - silver (100 kg)
- 1989 World Espoir Championship in Ulaanbaatar, Mongolia - silver (100 kg)
- 1989 World Championship in Martigny, Switzerland - 5th (100 kg)
- 1990 Balkan Juniors Championship in Sakarya, Turkey - gold (100 kg)
- 1990 European Espoir Championship in ?, Finland - gold (100 kg)
- 1990 European Championship in Poznań, Poland - bronze (100 kg)
- 1990 World Championship in Tokyo, Japan - 7th (100 kg)
- 1990 World Cup in Toledo, Ohio, United States - bronze
- 1991 World Championship in Varna, Bulgaria - 5th (130 kg)
- 1991 Mediterranean Games in Athens, Greece - gold (130 kg)
- 1991 European Championship in Stuttgart, Germany - bronze (130 kg)
- 1992 World Cup in Moscow Russia - 4th
- 1992 European Championship in Kaposvár, Hungary - silver (130 kg)
- 1992 Olympics in Barcelona, Spain - 4th (130 kg)
- 1993 European Championship in Istanbul, Turkey - gold (130 kg)
- 1994 European Championship in Rome, Italy - silver (130 kg)
- 1994 World Championship in Istanbul, Turkey - gold (130 kg)
- 1995 European Championship in Fribourg, Switzerland - gold (130 kg)
- 1995 World Cup in Chattanooga, Tennessee, United States - bronze (130 kg)
- 1995 World Championship in Atlanta, Georgia, United States - 5th (130 kg)
- 1996 European Championship in Budapest, Hungary - gold (130 kg)
- 1996 Olympics in Atlanta, Georgia, United States - gold (130 kg)
