= Zaza Turmanidze =

Georgian wrestler

Zaza Turmanidze (born 1 April 1965) is a Georgian former wrestler who competed in the 1996 Summer Olympics.
