= Rajab Ashabaliyev =

Azerbaijani sport wrestler

Personal information
- Full name: Rajab Ashabaliyev
- Nationality: Azerbaijan
- Born: 10 September 1973 (age 52) Baku, Azerbaijani SSR, Soviet Union
- Height: 1.78 m (5 ft 10 in)
- Weight: 117 kg (258 lb)

Sport
- Style: Freestyle
- Club: Neftchi
- Coach: Sagid Gadjiev

Rajab Ashabaliyev (born 10 September 1973) is an Azerbaijani former amateur freestyle wrestler, who competed in the men's super heavyweight category. He attained a fourth-place finish in the 130-kg division at the 1999 World Wrestling Championships in Ankara, Turkey and eventually wrestled for the Azerbaijani squad at the 2000 Summer Olympics in Sydney. Ashabaliyev trained throughout his sporting career as a member of the wrestling team for Neftchi Sports Club in Baku, under the tutelage of his longtime coach Sagid Gadjiev.

Ashabaliyev qualified for the Azerbaijani wrestling squad in the men's super heavyweight class (130 kg) at the 2000 Summer Olympics in Sydney, by placing fourth and securing a ticket to the Worlds one year earlier in Ankara, Turkey. Ashabaliyev wretchedly pinned Ukraine's Mirabi Valiyev in his opening bout, but he could not throw the U.S. wrestling rookie Kerry McCoy down the ring and lost the match with only eight seconds left by a technical superiority. Finishing second on the prelim pool and ninth overall in the final standings, Ashabaliyev's feat was not enough to advance him further into the quarterfinals.
