= Stephen Neal =

American football player (born 1976)

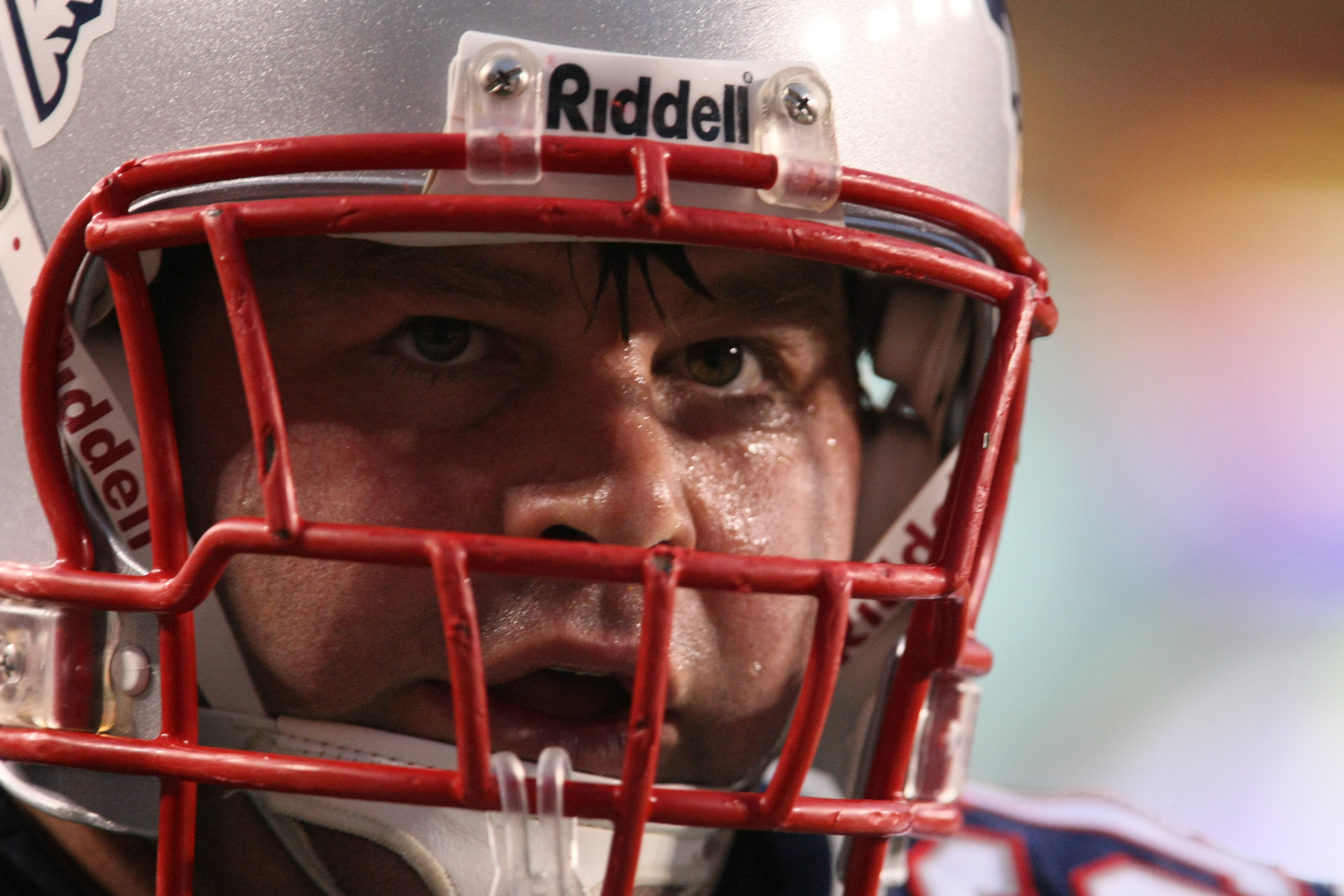
- Neal with the New England Patriots in 2009

No. 61
- Position: Guard

Personal information
- Born: October 9, 1976 (age 50); San Diego, California, U.S.
- Listed height: 6 ft 4 in (1.93 m)
- Listed weight: 305 lb (138 kg)

Career information
- High school: San Diego
- College: Cal State Bakersfield
- NFL draft: 2001: undrafted

Career history
- New England Patriots (2001)*; Philadelphia Eagles (2001)*; New England Patriots (2001–2010)
- * Offseason or practice squad member only

Awards and highlights
- 3× Super Bowl champion (XXXVI, XXXVIII, XXXIX); Freestyle Wrestling World champion (1999); 2× NCAA Division I Wrestling champion (1998, 1999)

Career NFL statistics
- Games played: 86
- Games started: 81
- Stats at Pro Football Reference

Medal record

Men's freestyle wrestling

Representing the United States

World Championships
Gold medal – first place	1999 Ankara	130 kg

Pan American Games
Gold medal – first place	1999 Winnipeg	130 kg

Men's collegiate wrestling

Representing the Cal State Bakersfield Roadrunners

NCAA Division I Championships
Gold medal – first place	1998 Cleveland	275 lb
Gold medal – first place	1999 State College	285 lb
Silver medal – second place	1997 Cedar Falls	275 lb

Stephen Matthew Neal (born October 9, 1976) is an American former professional football player who spent his entire career as a guard for the New England Patriots of the National Football League (NFL). He is a former world champion in freestyle wrestling and two-time NCAA national champion wrestler at Cal State-Bakersfield. He was signed by the Patriots as an undrafted free agent in 2001, and won three Super Bowl rings with the team. He is one of a handful of NFL players who did not play college football.

== Early life ==
Neal attended San Diego High School in San Diego, California, and was a letterman in football, wrestling, swimming, tennis, and track and field. In wrestling, as a senior, he posted a 45–2 record and placed fourth at the CIF Wrestling State Tournament in the 189-pound weight class. In 1995, he wrestled and defeated future NFL running back Ricky Williams.

== Wrestling career ==
Neal attended California State University, Bakersfield, and became one of the top wrestlers in the nation, compiling a 156–10 record with four All-American seasons. He placed fourth in NCAA Division I as a freshman and second as a sophomore before winning titles his junior and senior year. In 1997, in his sophomore season, Neal lost to two time heavyweight champ Kerry McCoy. The 1998 campaign saw Neal win his first NCAA heavyweight title 20–5 over Trent Hynek of Iowa State. His final title in 1999 came via a win over future NCAA wrestling champion, WWE champion, and UFC heavyweight champion Brock Lesnar (in March 2011, Lesnar told Opie & Anthony that his loss to Neal still sticks with him). In 1999, Neal won the Dan Hodge Award following a year in which he won the U.S. Freestyle Championship, the Pan-American Games title and the 1999 World Wrestling Championships at 286 pounds. In 1999, he won the FILA outstanding wrestler award, an honor given to the best wrestler in the world. Also for that year's performance, he received the Wade Schalles Award for best collegiate pinner. His 1999 season led up to the 2000 Summer Olympics trials where Kerry McCoy edged him for the trip to Sydney, Australia. After the trials, Neal retired from wrestling.

Neal set Pac-10 Conference records by finishing 34–0 in conference competition, while becoming the conference's first four-time winner in the same weight class, and second four-time winner ever. He finished his college career as Cal State-Bakersfield's career record holder in wins (156) and also set school records for pins in a season (31) and a career (71).

While at Cal State-Bakersfield, Neal was a four-time Academic All-American and a four-time Pac-10 Academic All-Conference selection.

In 2012, Neal was inducted into the National Wrestling Hall of Fame as a Distinguished Member.

== Football career ==
=== New England Patriots (first stint) ===
Despite not playing football in college, Neal was signed by the New England Patriots on July 23, 2001, as an undrafted free agent. He was waived by the Patriots on August 26, 2001.

=== Philadelphia Eagles ===
The Philadelphia Eagles signed Neal to their practice squad on September 4, 2001.

=== New England Patriots (second stint) ===
The Patriots re-signed Neal off the Eagles' practice squad on December 12, 2001, and he was inactive for the final three games of his 2001 rookie season, as well as the playoffs and Super Bowl XXXVI.

In 2002, Neal made the Patriots' 53-man roster out of training camp and spent the first four games of the season inactive before making his NFL debut as a reserve in Week 5. The next week against the Green Bay Packers, Neal made his first career start at guard, but suffered a season-ending shoulder injury in the game and was placed on injured reserve on October 23, 2002. The shoulder injury caused Neal to miss the entire 2003 season as well, after being placed on the Physically Unable to Perform (PUP) list to start the season.

After playing in two games as a reserve to start the 2004 season, Neal went on to start the final 14 games of the season, including the playoffs and the Super Bowl, earning his third Super Bowl ring with the team by winning Super Bowl XXXIX. Neal started all 16 games for the Patriots in 2005, and re-signed with the team after testing the free agent market following the season.

Neal started 13 games in 2006 at right guard, missing three games with a shoulder injury. He would return in 2007 to play and start in only eight games due to injury, but started all three playoff games, including Super Bowl XLII.

After beginning the 2008 season on the PUP list with a shoulder injury, Neal returned to play in the final 11 games of the season, starting the final nine games. In 2009, Neal missed time with the shoulder injury again, but played in and started 12 games.

In March 2010, Neal was re-signed to a two-year contract. Neal then played in the first eight games of the 2010 season before being placed on injured reserve with the shoulder injury on December 2, 2010.

Neal retired on March 2, 2011.

== Personal life ==
Stephen is married and has two daughters

His cousin, Pete Thomas, also played football.
