= Oleg Ladik =

Canadian wrestler (1971–2025)

Personal information
- Born: 18 September 1971 Kyiv, Ukraine
- Died: 21 October 2025 (aged 54)

Sport
- Coached by: Victor Zilberman
Medal record
Men's wrestling
Representing Canada
World Cup
Gold medal – first place	1993 Chattanooga	100 kg
Maccabiah Games
Gold medal – first place	1993 Israel	Wrestling
Representing Soviet Union
Espoir World Cup
Gold medal – first place	1990 Prince Albert	100 kg
U20 Word Championships
Gold medal – first place	1988 Wolfurt	88 kg

Oleg Ladik (18 September 1971 – 21 October 2025) was a Ukrainian-born Soviet and Canadian Olympic wrestler, who won a gold medal in the 1993 Maccabiah Games in Israel. He was born in Kyiv, Ukraine.

== Wrestling career ==
Ladik competed for Team Soviet Union in the 1988 U20 Word Championships in Wolfurt, winning a gold medal. He also received the gold medal at the 1990 Espoir World Cup, and bronze medal at the 1990 USSR Championships after winning against the reining European champion Arawat Sabejew. Ladik competed for Team Canada in the 1993 Maccabiah Games in Israel, winning a gold medal at 21 years of age. He also won the gold medal at the 1993 World Cup, by defeating the reigning CIS and two-time USSR Champion Andrey Golovko. He competed in the 1996 Summer Olympics, Heavyweight, Freestyle (≤100 kilograms), coming in 8th. Ladik competed in the 1995 World Wrestling Championship: 100.0 kg. Freestyle (coming in 9th); 1997 World Wrestling Championship: 130.0 kg. Freestyle (coming in 8th); and 1998 World Wrestling Championship: 130.0 kg. Freestyle (coming in 11th).
