= Petros Bourdoulis =

Greek wrestler (born 1970)

Petros Bourdoulis (born 13 September 1970 in Georgian SSR) is a Greek former wrestler who competed in the 1992 Summer Olympics and in the 1996 Summer Olympics.
