= Hiroyuki Obata =

Japanese wrestler (born 1969)

Personal information
- Full name: 小幡弘之 Obata Hiroyuki
- Nationality: Japanese
- Born: 31 March 1969 (age 57) Saitama, Japan

Sport
- Sport: Wrestling

Hiroyuki Obata (born 31 March 1969) is a Japanese wrestler, who competed in the men's freestyle 130 kg at the 1988 Summer Olympics.
