= Feng Aigang =

Chinese former wrestler (born 1975)

Feng Aigang (born 20 December 1975) is a Chinese former wrestler who competed in the 1996 Summer Olympics. He is affiliated to the Beijing Sports Club.
