= Aleksandr Kovalevsky =

Kyrgyzstani wrestler

Aleksandr Kovalevsky (born 18 May 1974) is a Kyrgyzstani former wrestler who competed in the 1996 and 2000 Summer Olympics.
