= Sven Thiele =

German wrestler

Personal information
- Nationality: Germany
- Born: 21 August 1973 (age 52)

Sport
- Sport: Wrestling
Medal record
Men's freestyle wrestling
Representing Germany
World Championships
Silver medal – second place	1995 Atlanta	130 kg
World Cup
Gold medal – first place	2003 Boise	120 kg
European Championships
Bronze medal – third place	2001 Budapest	130 kg
Bronze medal – third place	2000 Budapest	130 kg
Bronze medal – third place	1999 Minsk	130 kg
Bronze medal – third place	1997 Warsaw	130 kg
Silver medal – second place	1996 Budapest	130 kg
Dan Kolov & Nikola Petrov Tournament
Gold medal – first place	1997 Sofia	130 kg
Grand Prix of Germany
Gold medal – first place	2003 Leipzig	120 kg
Gold medal – first place	1998 Leipzig	130 kg
Gold medal – first place	1993 Leipzig	130 kg

Sven Thiele (born 12 May 1969 in Merseburg) is a German former wrestler who competed in the 1996 Summer Olympics, in the 2000 Summer Olympics, and in the 2004 Summer Olympics. He is father of Erik Thiele.

== Highlight achievements ==
- Silver medal at World Championships, 1995.
- World Cup Champion, 2003.
- Silver medal at European Championships, 1996.
- Four-time European Championships bronze medalist.
- Gold medal at World Military Championships, 2001.
- 1997 Dan Kolov & Nikola Petrov Tournament Champion. Sven Thiele beat the 1996 Olympic medalist and 1994 World Champion Arawat Sabejew in the final.
- Three-time Germany′s Grand Prix Champion. At the 1993 and 1998 Grand Prix, Sven Thiele beat the 1988 Olympic medalist and World Champion Andreas Schröder, and reining World Champion Zekeriya Güçlü 2-0, respectively.
- 1992 German National Champion. Sven Thiele beat the 1988 Olympic medalist and reining World Champion Andreas Schröder in the final.
