= Metin Topaktaş =

Turkish wrestler

Personal information
- Nationality: Turkish
- Born: 15 July 1967 (age 59)

Sport
- Sport: Wrestling

Metin Topaktaş (born 15 July 1967) is a Turkish wrestler. He competed in the men's freestyle 52 kg at the 1996 Summer Olympics.
