= Zsolt Gombos =

Hungarian wrestler

Zsolt Gombos (born 27 February 1968 in Zalaegerszeg) is a Hungarian former wrestler who competed in the 1992 Summer Olympics, in the 1996 Summer Olympics, and in the 2000 Summer Olympics.
