= Andrey Shumilin =

Russian wrestler (1970–2022)

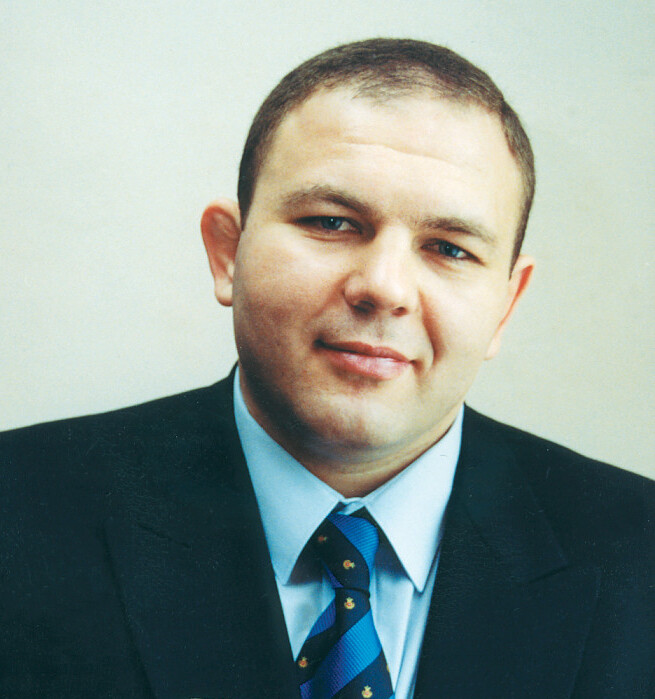
- Shumilin in 1999

Medal record

Men's freestyle wrestling

Representing Russia

World Championships
Silver medal – second place	1999 Ankara	130 kg freestyle
Bronze medal – third place	1998 Tehran	130 kg freestyle
Bronze medal – third place	1993 Toronto	130 kg freestyle

European Championships
Gold medal – first place	1999 Minsk	130 kg freestyle
Bronze medal – third place	1994 Rome	130 kg freestyle
Bronze medal – third place	1990 Poznań	130 kg freestyle

Andrey Anatolyevich Shumilin (Russian: Андрей Анатольевич Шумилин; 9 March 1970 – 8 June 2022) was a Russian wrestler. He competed in the 1996 Summer Olympics and came fourth in the super-heavyweight freestyle event.

== Wrestling career ==
Shumilin was born in Kaliningrad, Russian SFSR. In 1980, his father brought him to the junior sports school. At 16 years old he was already a master of sports of the USSR. In the 1986 he won the USSR championship and the Juniors' World championship. The next year Shumilin repeated his success – he was already double Juniors' World champion. In 1989 he was junior's European champion. From 1990 he was a regular member of the Russian national wrestling team.
