= Ahmet Gülhan =

Turkish freestyle wrestler

Personal information
- Nationality: Turkish
- Born: March 28, 1977 (age 49)

Sport
- Country: Turkey
- Sport: Olympic wrestling
- Event: Freestyle wrestling
- Club: Amasya Şekerspor
- Coached by: İbrahim Akgün
Medal record
Representing Turkey
Men's Freestyle wrestling
European Championships
Gold medal – first place	2001 Budapest	69 kg
Bronze medal – third place	2005 Varna	74 kg
Military World Games
Gold medal – first place	2007 Hyderabad	74 kg
World University Championship
Gold medal – first place	2000 Tokyo	69 kg
Silver medal – second place	1998 Ankara	69 kg
World Cup
Gold medal – first place	2001 Baltimore	69 kg
European Junior Championships
Bronze medal – third place	1997 Istanbul	65 kg

Ahmet Gülhan is a Turkish freestyle wrestler competing in the 74 kg division. He is a member of Amasya Şekerspor.

He participated in Men's freestyle 74 kg at 2008 Summer Olympics. After beating Ali Abdo from Australia he lost with Buvaisar Saitiev from Russia. In Repechage Round he lost with and was eliminated by Cho Byung-Kwan from South Korea.

He was suspended from wrestling for two years after doping testing positive for banned for used Efedrin
