= Aleksey Medvedev (wrestler) =

Belarusian Greco-Roman wrestler

Aleksei Medvedev
Personal information
- Born: 5 October 1972 (age 53) Minsk, Byelorussian SSR, Soviet Union
Medal record
Men's freestyle wrestling
Representing Belarus
Olympic Games
Silver medal – second place	1996 Atlanta	130 kg

Aleksei Vladimirovich Medvedev (Russian: Алексей Владимирович Медведев; Belarusian: Аляксей Мядзведзеў; born 5 October 1972 in Minsk) is a Belarusian wrestler. At the 1996 Summer Olympics he won the silver medal in the men's Freestyle Heavyweight (130 kg) category.
