= Ahmet Doğu =

Turkish wrestler (born 1973)

Personal information
- Nationality: Turkish
- Born: 26 November 1973 (age 52) Razgrad, Bulgaria

Sport
- Sport: Wrestling
- Club: İstanbul Tekel
- Turned pro: 1984
- Coached by: Müsamettin Oruş
- Retired: 2000
Medal record
Men's freestyle wrestling
Representing Turkey
World Championships
Silver medal – second place	1997 Krasnoyarsk	97 kg
Grand Prix
Silver medal – second place	1995 Leipzig	100 kg
European Juniors Championships
Gold medal – first place	1991 Istanbul	88 kg

Ahmet Doğu (born 26 November 1973) is a Turkish wrestler. He competed in the men's freestyle 97 kg at the 2000 Summer Olympics.

== Career ==
Ahmet Doğu started wrestling there in 1984 after having grown up in Istanbul. He became a member of the ‘ Istanbul Tekel’ sports club. His coach was Müsamettin Oruş. He wrestled mainly in the free style and, at a height of 1.80 metres, grew into an impressive heavyweight of around 100 kg as a senior. In 1991, he became European Junior Champion in Istanbul in the 88 kg category.

In 1997 at the 1997 World Wrestling Championships held at the Yenisey Sports Hall in Krosnoyarsk, Russia, Ahmet Doğu defeated Australian Mushtaq Abdullah 10-2 in the first round, Cuban Wilfredo Morales 3-1 in the second round, passed the quarter-finals and defeated Latvian Jurijs Janovičs 1-0 in the semifinals to reach the final. He lost to Russian Kuramagomed Kuramagomedov 5-0 in the final and won the silver medal.

At the 2000 Olympic Games in Sydney, he lost Alireza Heidari from Iran in the first round by 6-1 points. In his second match, he also surprisingly lost to Rolf Scherrer from Switzerland by 4-3 points and therefore finished in a sixteenth place. After that, he did not take part in any more international championships.
