= Yaşar Doğu =

Turkish freestyle wrestler (1913–1961)

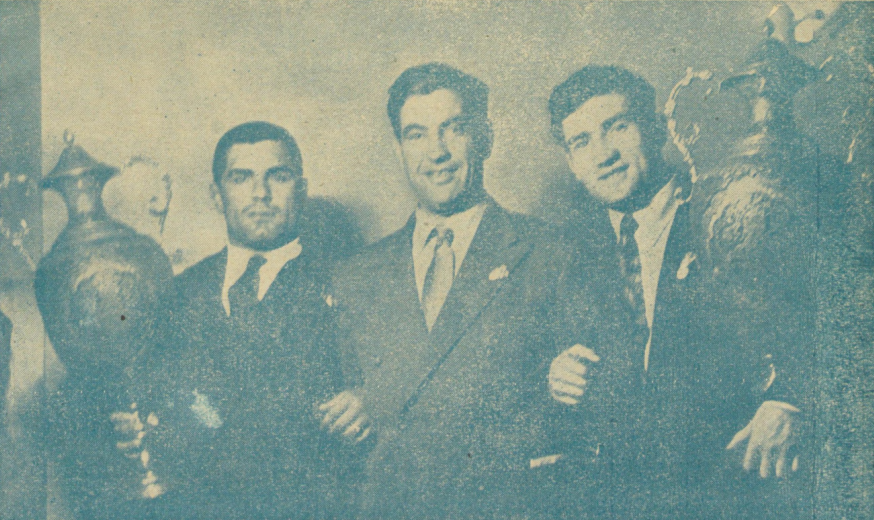
- Yasar Dogu in 1947 (on the left) with Baba Hakkı Yeten and Gazanfer Bilge

Personal information
- Full name: Yaşar Doğu
- Born: Yaşar Doğu; 1913 Samsun, Ottoman Empire
- Died: 8 January 1961 (aged 47–48) Ankara, Turkey

Sport
- Sport: Wrestling
- Events: Freestyle, Greco-Roman
- Coached by: Faik Dura
Medal record
Representing Turkey
Freestyle wrestling
Olympic Games
Gold medal – first place	1948 London	Welterweight
World Championships
Gold medal – first place	1951 Helsinki	Light heavyweight
European Championships
Gold medal – first place	1946 Stockholm	Welterweight
Gold medal – first place	1949 Warsaw	Middleweight
Greco-Roman wrestling
European Championships
Gold medal – first place	1947 Prague	Lightweight
Silver medal – second place	1939 Bucharest	Lightweight
Balkan Championships
Gold medal – first place	1940 Istanbul	Lightweight

Yaşar Doğu (1913 – 8 January 1961) was a Turkish wrestler. He competed in freestyle and Greco-Roman wrestling, winning gold at the Olympic, world, and European championships.

== Biography ==
Doğu was born in the village Karlı of Kavak district in Samsun province to a family of Circassian origin. He began wrestling at his age of 15 in yağlı güreş (oil wrestling) and continued in this folk sport until he entered military service. His sports wrestling career started 1936 in Ankara as he was discovered by the wrestler Celal Atik.

He was admitted to the national team in 1939. He participated at the European Championships held that year in Oslo, Norway and became silver medalist in the Greco-Roman style. He became Balkan, European and World champion besides Olympic gold medalist. Yaşar Doğu wrestled 47 times in the national team between 1939 and 1951, of which only one he lost. 33 of his matches he won by near-fall. All his 46 winning matches lasted 372 minutes in total, whereas the normal duration should be 690 minutes. After retiring from the active sports, he served as the trainer of the national team.

Doğu married Hayriye on 15 October 1937. Yaşar Doğu gave the name Gazanfer to one of his sons in admiration to his teammate Gazanfer Bilge. His son Gazanfer Doğu was educated in the US, and became a lecturer of physical education and sports at Abant Izzet Baysal University in Bolu.

He suffered a heart attack during the 1955 championships held in Sweden, where he was the trainer of Turkey's wrestling team. Doğu died in Ankara on 8 January 1961, following a second heart attack.

== Achievements ==
- 1939 European Wrestling Championships in Oslo, Norway - silver (Greco-Roman style Lightweight)
- 1940 Balkan Wrestling Championships in Istanbul, Turkey - gold (Greco-Roman style Lightweight)
- 1946 European Wrestling Championships in Stockholm, Sweden - gold (Freestyle Welterweight)
- 1947 European Wrestling Championships in Prague, Czechoslovakia - gold (Greco-Roman style Welterweight)
- 1948 Summer Olympics in London, England - gold (Freestyle Welterweight)
- 1949 European Wrestling Championships in Istanbul, Turkey - gold (Freestyle Middleweight)
- 1951 World Wrestling Championships in Helsinki, Finland - gold (Freestyle Light heavyweight)

== Legacy ==
- Yaşar Doğu Sports Hall, 1966-built venue with 1,500 seating capacity in downtown Samsun
- Yaşar Doğu Wrestling Hall, 1989-built wrestling designated venue for 250 spectators in Samsun
- Tekkeköy Yaşar Doğu Arena, 7,500-seat multi-purpose indoor venue in Tekkeköy district of Samsun Province opened end March 2013
- Yaşar Doğu Tournament, annually held freestyle wrestling tournament
