= 2003 World Wrestling Championships – Men's freestyle 120 kg =

Men's freestyle 120 kg at the 2003 World Championships
- Venue: Madison Square Garden
- Dates: 12–14 September 2003
- Competitors: 29 from 29 nations

Medalists
gold medal	Artur Taymazov	Uzbekistan
silver medal	Kerry McCoy	United States
bronze medal	Alireza Rezaei	Iran

The men's freestyle 120 kilograms is a competition featured at the 2003 World Wrestling Championships, and was held at the Madison Square Garden in New York, United States from 12 to 14 September 2003.

== Results ==
Legend

- F — Won by fall

=== Preliminary round ===
==== Pool 1 ====
Pos	Athlete	Pld	W	L	CP	TP	KAZ	POL	CHN
1	Marid Mutalimov (KAZ)	2	2	0	6	7	—	3–0	4–0
2	Radosław Jankowski (POL)	2	1	1	3	3	0–3 PO	—	3–0
3	Li Jinlong (CHN)	2	0	2	0	0	0–3 PO	0–3 PO	—

Source: Official website

==== Pool 2 ====
Pos	Athlete	Pld	W	L	CP	TP	HUN	JPN	IRL
1	Ottó Aubéli (HUN)	2	2	0	7	16	—	3–1	13–0 Fall
2	Kohei Suwama (JPN)	2	1	1	4	9	1–3 PP	—	8–0
3	Adrian Gilmore (IRL)	2	0	2	0	0	0–4 TO	0–3 PO	—

Source: Official website

==== Pool 3 ====
Pos	Athlete	Pld	W	L	CP	TP	USA	RSA	AZE
1	Kerry McCoy (USA)	2	2	0	8	16	—	11–1	5–0 Fall
2	Duane van Staden (RSA)	2	1	1	4	7	1–4 SP	—	6–1
3	Davud Magomedov (AZE)	2	0	2	1	1	0–4 TO	1–3 PP	—

Source: Official website

==== Pool 4 ====
Pos	Athlete	Pld	W	L	CP	TP	BLR	AUS	CAN
1	Barys Hrynkevich (BLR)	2	2	0	7	9	—	4–0 Fall	5–1
2	Hardip Bassi (AUS)	2	1	1	4	4	0–4 TO	—	4–9 Fall
3	Colbie Bell (CAN)	2	0	2	1	10	1–3 PP	0–4 TO	—

Source: Official website

==== Pool 5 ====
Pos	Athlete	Pld	W	L	CP	TP	IRI	TUR	SUI
1	Alireza Rezaei (IRI)	2	2	0	7	13	—	3–2	10–0
2	Recep Kara (TUR)	2	1	1	5	2	1–3 PP	—	WO
3	Mirko Silian (SUI)	2	0	2	0	0	0–4 ST	0–4 PA	—

Source: Official website

==== Pool 6 ====
Pos	Athlete	Pld	W	L	CP	TP	UZB	RUS	BUL
1	Artur Taymazov (UZB)	2	2	0	6	13	—	4–1	9–0
2	Kuramagomed Kuramagomedov (RUS)	2	1	1	4	10	1–3 PP	—	9–0
3	Bozhidar Boyadzhiev (BUL)	2	0	2	0	0	0–3 PO	0–3 PO	—

Source: Official website

==== Pool 7 ====
Pos	Athlete	Pld	W	L	CP	TP	GEO	IND	VEN
1	Alex Modebadze (GEO)	2	2	0	7	18	—	8–0	10–0
2	Jagdish Kaliraman (IND)	2	1	1	4	10	0–3 PO	—	10–0 Fall
3	Édgar Becerra (VEN)	2	0	2	0	0	0–4 ST	0–4 TO	—

Source: Official website

==== Pool 8 ====
Pos	Athlete	Pld	W	L	CP	TP	GRE	GER	ROM	BRA
1	Efstathios Topalidis (GRE)	3	3	0	10	18	—	2–1	9–3	7–0 Fall
2	Sven Thiele (GER)	3	2	1	8	16	1–3 PP	—	3–2	12–0
3	Rareș Chintoan (ROM)	3	1	2	6	19	1–3 PP	1–3 PP	—	14–0 Fall
4	Marcos Oliveira (BRA)	3	0	3	0	0	0–4 TO	0–4 ST	0–4 TO	—

Source: Official website

==== Pool 9 ====
Pos	Athlete	Pld	W	L	CP	TP	UKR	MGL	GBR	SEN
1	Serhii Priadun (UKR)	3	3	0	10	38	—	3–1	26–1	9–2
2	Gelegjamtsyn Ösökhbayar (MGL)	3	2	1	8	16	1–3 PP	—	8–1	7–3 Fall
3	Douglas Thomson (GBR)	3	1	2	6	4	1–4 SP	1–3 PP	—	2–0 Fall
4	Antoine Bakhoum (SEN)	3	0	3	1	5	1–3 PP	0–4 TO	0–4 TO	—

Source: Official website

=== Knockout round ===
Round of 16
Marid Mutalimov (KAZ)	3
Ottó Aubéli (HUN)	1

Quarterfinals
Marid Mutalimov (KAZ)	0
Kerry McCoy (USA)	5
Barys Hrynkevich (BLR)	0
Alireza Rezaei (IRI)	10
Artur Taymazov (UZB)	5^{F}
Alex Modebadze (GEO)	0
Efstathios Topalidis (GRE)	2
Serhii Priadun (UKR)	3

Semifinals
Kerry McCoy (USA)	3^{F}
Alireza Rezaei (IRI)	0
Artur Taymazov (UZB)	7
Serhii Priadun (UKR)	0

Final
Kerry McCoy (USA)	1
Artur Taymazov (UZB)	4
Bronze medal match
Alireza Rezaei (IRI)	3
Serhii Priadun (UKR)	0
