= 2001 World Wrestling Championships – Men's freestyle 130 kg =

Men's freestyle 130 kg at the 2001 World Championships
- Venue: Winter Sports Palace
- Dates: 23–25 November 2001
- Competitors: 21 from 21 nations

Medalists
gold medal	David Musulbes	Russia
silver medal	Artur Taymazov	Uzbekistan
bronze medal	Alexis Rodríguez	Cuba

The men's freestyle 130 kilograms is a competition featured at the 2001 World Wrestling Championships, and was held at the Winter Sports Palace in Sofia, Bulgaria from 23 to 25 November 2001.

== Results ==
Legend

- F — Won by fall

=== Preliminary round ===
==== Pool 1 ====
Pos	Athlete	Pld	W	L	CP	TP	BUL	IND	VEN
1	Bozhidar Boyadzhiev (BUL)	2	2	0	7	17	—	4–1	13–0 Fall
2	Palwinder Singh Cheema (IND)	2	1	1	5	12	1–3 PP	—	11–0
3	Yonsy Sánchez (VEN)	2	0	2	0	0	0–4 TO	0–4 ST	—

Source: Official website

==== Pool 2 ====
Pos	Athlete	Pld	W	L	CP	TP	CUB	EGY	GEO
1	Alexis Rodríguez (CUB)	2	2	0	7	9	—	5–0 Ret	4–0
2	Hisham Abdelwahab (EGY)	2	1	1	4	0	0–4 PA	—	WO
3	Alex Modebadze (GEO)	2	0	2	0	0	0–3 PO	0–4 PA	—

Source: Official website

==== Pool 3 ====
Pos	Athlete	Pld	W	L	CP	TP	IRI	GRE	JPN
1	Abbas Jadidi (IRI)	2	2	0	7	16	—	6–0	10–0
2	Theofilos Abatzis (GRE)	2	1	1	4	4	0–3 PO	—	4–0 Fall
3	Hisashi Fujita (JPN)	2	0	2	0	0	0–4 ST	0–4 TO	—

Source: Official website

==== Pool 4 ====
Pos	Athlete	Pld	W	L	CP	TP	UZB	UKR	GER
1	Artur Taymazov (UZB)	2	2	0	8	15	—	11–0	4–0 Fall
2	Yuri Chobitko (UKR)	2	1	1	3	3	0–4 ST	—	3–1
3	Sven Thiele (GER)	2	0	2	1	1	0–4 TO	1–3 PP	—

Source: Official website

==== Pool 5 ====
Pos	Athlete	Pld	W	L	CP	TP	RUS	BLR	KOR
1	David Musulbes (RUS)	2	2	0	8	22	—	11–0	11–0
2	Barys Hrynkevich (BLR)	2	1	1	4	11	0–4 ST	—	11–0
3	Jung Chun-mo (KOR)	2	0	2	0	0	0–4 ST	0–4 ST	—

Source: Official website

==== Pool 6 ====
Pos	Athlete	Pld	W	L	CP	TP	TUR	POL	SUI
1	Aydın Polatçı (TUR)	2	2	0	7	13	—	3–0	10–0
2	Marek Garmulewicz (POL)	2	1	1	3	6	0–3 PO	—	6–1
3	Mirko Silian (SUI)	2	0	2	1	1	0–4 ST	1–3 PP	—

Source: Official website

==== Pool 7 ====
Pos	Athlete	Pld	W	L	CP	TP	USA	MGL	HUN
1	Kerry McCoy (USA)	2	2	0	8	13	—	3–0 Fall	10–0
2	Gelegjamtsyn Ösökhbayar (MGL)	2	1	1	3	6	0–4 TO	—	6–0
3	Ottó Aubéli (HUN)	2	0	2	0	0	0–4 ST	0–3 PO	—

Source: Official website

=== Knockout round ===
Quarterfinals
Bozhidar Boyadzhiev (BUL)	1
Alexis Rodríguez (CUB)	4
Abbas Jadidi (IRI)	0
Artur Taymazov (UZB)	3
David Musulbes (RUS)	3
Aydın Polatçı (TUR)	1

Semifinals
Alexis Rodríguez (CUB)	1
Artur Taymazov (UZB)	7^{F}
David Musulbes (RUS)	8
Kerry McCoy (USA)	0

Final
Artur Taymazov (UZB)	3
David Musulbes (RUS)	4
Bronze medal match
Alexis Rodríguez (CUB)	3
Kerry McCoy (USA)	1
