= 2007 World Wrestling Championships – Men's freestyle 120 kg =

Men's freestyle 120 kg at the 2007 World Championships
- Venue: Heydar Aliyev Sports and Concert Complex
- Dates: 21 September 2007
- Competitors: 35 from 35 nations

Medalists
gold medal	Bilyal Makhov	Russia
silver medal	Alexis Rodríguez	Cuba
bronze medal	Vadim Tasoyev	Ukraine
bronze medal	Artur Taymazov	Uzbekistan

The men's freestyle 120 kilograms is a competition featured at the 2007 World Wrestling Championships, and was held at the Heydar Aliyev Sports and Concert Complex in Baku, Azerbaijan on 21 September 2007.

== Results ==
Legend

- F — Won by fall

=== Finals ===
Semifinals			Final
Fatih Çakıroğlu (TUR)	0	0
Bilyal Makhov (RUS)	1	1	Bilyal Makhov (RUS)	1	1
Alexis Rodríguez (CUB)	1	1	Alexis Rodríguez (CUB)	0	0
Artur Taymazov (UZB)	0	0

=== Top half ===
==== Section 1 ====
Round of 64

Round of 32
Arjan Bhullar (CAN)	0	0
Fatih Çakıroğlu (TUR)	1	1
Efstathios Topalidis (GRE)	3	3
Akihito Tanaka (JPN)	3	0
Marid Mutalimov (KAZ)	1	2
Liang Lei (CHN)	0	0
Palwinder Singh Cheema (IND)	0	0
Ruslan Basiev (ARM)	1	3

Round of 16
Fatih Çakıroğlu (TUR)	1	3
Efstathios Topalidis (GRE)	0	0
Marid Mutalimov (KAZ)	0	1	1
Ruslan Basiev (ARM)	2	0	0

Quarterfinals
Fatih Çakıroğlu (TUR)	1	1
Marid Mutalimov (KAZ)	0	0

==== Section 2 ====
Round of 64

Round of 32
Bilyal Makhov (RUS)	4	6
Vincenzo Lipari (ITA)	0	0
Vadim Tasoyev (UKR)	2	4^{F}
Soslan Sagalaev (TJK)	0	0
Kun Killin (FSM)	0	1
Denis Roberts (AUS)	6	9
Go Soung-jin (KOR)	1	3
Yahya Abdul-Kareem (IRQ)	0	1

Round of 16
Bilyal Makhov (RUS)	1	1
Vadim Tasoyev (UKR)	0	1
Denis Roberts (AUS)	2
Go Soung-jin (KOR)	5^{F}

Quarterfinals
Bilyal Makhov (RUS)	3	3
Go Soung-jin (KOR)	0	1

=== Bottom half ===
==== Section 3 ====
Round of 64

Round of 32
Aliaksei Mastsiapanau (BLR)	0	0
Bozhidar Boyadzhiev (BUL)	2	3
Mirko Silian (SUI)	0	0
José Cuba (ESP)	1	6
Lawrence Langowski (MEX)	1	0
Tommy Rowlands (USA)	6	6
Martin Siddiqui (GER)	0	0
Alexis Rodríguez (CUB)	6	1

Round of 16
Bozhidar Boyadzhiev (BUL)	3	6
José Cuba (ESP)	0	0
Tommy Rowlands (USA)	0	0
Alexis Rodríguez (CUB)	2	1

Quarterfinals
Bozhidar Boyadzhiev (BUL)	0	2
Alexis Rodríguez (CUB)	3	3

==== Section 4 ====
Round of 64
Ottó Aubéli (HUN)	0	0
Davit Modzmanashvili (GEO)	1	6
David Vála (CZE)	1	2
Gheorghe Susumcov (MDA)	0	1
Artur Taymazov (UZB)	6	6
Rareș Chintoan (ROU)	0	0

Round of 32
Ali Isayev (AZE)	4	1
Maksymilian Witek (POL)	2	0
Ganzorigiin Gankhuyag (MGL)	3	5
Sergejs Djomins (LAT)	0	1
Fardin Masoumi (IRI)	2	1
Davit Modzmanashvili (GEO)	0	0
David Vála (CZE)	0
Artur Taymazov (UZB)	7^{F}

Round of 16
Ali Isayev (AZE)	3	3^{F}
Ganzorigiin Gankhuyag (MGL)	5	0
Fardin Masoumi (IRI)	0	1
Artur Taymazov (UZB)	1	3

Quarterfinals
Ali Isayev (AZE)	0	0
Artur Taymazov (UZB)	1	4

=== Repechage ===
Repechage round 2
Vincenzo Lipari (ITA)	0	0
Vadim Tasoyev (UKR)	7	6^{F}
Martin Siddiqui (GER)	3	0	0
Tommy Rowlands (USA)	1	1	3

Repechage round 3
Vadim Tasoyev (UKR)	4	3
Go Soung-jin (KOR)	1	1
Tommy Rowlands (USA)	1	1	3
Bozhidar Boyadzhiev (BUL)	0	2	0

Bronze medals
Vadim Tasoyev (UKR)	1	1
Fatih Çakıroğlu (TUR)	0	0
Tommy Rowlands (USA)	0	0
Artur Taymazov (UZB)	3	6
