= 2005 World Wrestling Championships – Men's freestyle 120 kg =

Men's freestyle 120 kg at the 2005 World Championships
- Venue: László Papp Budapest Sports Arena
- Dates: 28 September 2005
- Competitors: 27 from 27 nations

Medalists
gold medal	Aydın Polatçı	Turkey
silver medal	Alexis Rodríguez	Cuba
bronze medal	Ottó Aubéli	Hungary
bronze medal	Tolly Thompson	United States

The men's freestyle 120 kilograms is a competition featured at the 2005 World Wrestling Championships, and was held at the László Papp Budapest Sports Arena in Budapest, Hungary on 28 September 2005.

This freestyle wrestling competition consists of a single-elimination tournament, with a repechage used to determine the winner of two bronze medals.

== Results ==
Legend

- F — Won by fall

=== Final ===
Final
Alexis Rodríguez (CUB)	1	0	0
Aydın Polatçı (TUR)	0	2	1

=== Top half ===
Round of 32
Nikolay Telegin (AZE)	0	0
Alexis Rodríguez (CUB)	2	2
Krasimir Kochev (BUL)	0	1
Alex Modebadze (GEO)	1	1
Markus Hamann (GER)	0	0
Liang Lei (CHN)	1	1

Round of 16
Ismail Jamal (QAT)	0	2
Maksymilian Witek (POL)	5	4
Ari Taub (CAN)	0	0
Ottó Aubéli (HUN)	1	1
Marid Mutalimov (KAZ)	1	1
Alexis Rodríguez (CUB)	2	2
Alex Modebadze (GEO)	1	0	0
Liang Lei (CHN)	1	1	7

Quarterfinals
Maksymilian Witek (POL)	0	0
Ottó Aubéli (HUN)	1	1
Alexis Rodríguez (CUB)	1	4
Liang Lei (CHN)	0	1

Semifinals
Ottó Aubéli (HUN)	0	0
Alexis Rodríguez (CUB)	2	2

=== Bottom half ===
Round of 32
Artur Taymazov (UZB)	7	5
Ramond Rusland (SUR)	0	0
Palwinder Singh Cheema (IND)	0	0
Rareș Chintoan (ROM)	4	8
Tolly Thompson (USA)	0	1	1
Aydın Polatçı (TUR)	1	0	6
Vadim Tasoyev (UKR)	7	3
Winchell Negron (PUR)	0	0
Tüvshintöriin Enkhtuyaa (MGL)	1	0	2
Akihito Tanaka (JPN)	1	3	1
Francesco Miano-Petta (ITA)	0	0
Fardin Masoumi (IRI)	7	3
Kuramagomed Kuramagomedov (RUS)	1	1
Maksim Mikhalevich (BLR)	0	0
Hisham Abdelwahab (EGY)	2	1	1
Yordany Hernández (GUA)	0	2	0

Round of 16
Artur Taymazov (UZB)	5	4	0
Rareș Chintoan (ROM)	1	6	1
Aydın Polatçı (TUR)	1	0	1
Vadim Tasoyev (UKR)	0	1	0
Tüvshintöriin Enkhtuyaa (MGL)	0	1
Fardin Masoumi (IRI)	3	1
Kuramagomed Kuramagomedov (RUS)	3	1
Hisham Abdelwahab (EGY)	0	0

Quarterfinals
Rareș Chintoan (ROM)	0	1	0
Aydın Polatçı (TUR)	1	0	4
Fardin Masoumi (IRI)	0	1	0
Kuramagomed Kuramagomedov (RUS)	1	0	1

Semifinals
Aydın Polatçı (TUR)	1	0	1
Kuramagomed Kuramagomedov (RUS)	0	1	1

=== Repechage ===
Repechage round 1
Nikolay Telegin (AZE)	0	0
Marid Mutalimov (KAZ)	2	1
Tolly Thompson (USA)	3	4
Vadim Tasoyev (UKR)	1	1

Repechage round 2
Marid Mutalimov (KAZ)	0	0
Liang Lei (CHN)	1	2
Tolly Thompson (USA)	7^{F}
Rareș Chintoan (ROM)	0

Bronze medals
Liang Lei (CHN)	0	1
Ottó Aubéli (HUN)	1	1
Tolly Thompson (USA)	1	1
Kuramagomed Kuramagomedov (RUS)	0	0
