= 2002 World Wrestling Championships – Men's freestyle 120 kg =

Men's freestyle 120 kg at the 2002 World Championships
- Venue: Azadi Indoor Stadium
- Dates: 6–7 September 2002
- Competitors: 24 from 24 nations

Medalists
gold medal	David Musulbes	Russia
silver medal	Alexis Rodríguez	Cuba
bronze medal	Aydın Polatçı	Turkey

The men's freestyle 120 kilograms is a competition featured at the 2002 World Wrestling Championships, and was held at the Azadi Indoor Stadium in Tehran, Iran from 6 to 7 September 2002.

== Results ==
=== Preliminary round ===
==== Pool 1 ====
Pos	Athlete	Pld	W	L	CP	TP	HUN	GRE	IRQ
1	Ottó Aubéli (HUN)	2	2	0	6	6	—	3–1	3–0
2	Dimitrios Theodoridis (GRE)	2	1	1	4	4	1–3 PP	—	3–1
3	Mohammed Jabr (IRQ)	2	0	2	1	1	0–3 PO	1–3 PP	—

Source: Official website

==== Pool 2 ====
Pos	Athlete	Pld	W	L	CP	TP	CUB	BUL	BRA
1	Alexis Rodríguez (CUB)	2	2	0	7	14	—	3–1	11–0 Fall
2	Bozhidar Boyadzhiev (BUL)	2	1	1	5	12	1–3 PP	—	11–0
3	Marcos Oliveira (BRA)	2	0	2	0	0	0–4 TO	0–4 ST	—

Source: Official website

==== Pool 3 ====
Pos	Athlete	Pld	W	L	CP	TP	KAZ	JPN	SEN
1	Ruslan Shikhsafiyev (KAZ)	2	2	0	7	17	—	7–5	10–0 Fall
2	Akihito Tanaka (JPN)	2	1	1	4	16	1–3 PP	—	11–2
3	Antoine Bakhoum (SEN)	2	0	2	1	2	0–4 TO	1–3 PP	—

Source: Official website

==== Pool 4 ====
Pos	Athlete	Pld	W	L	CP	TP	GEO	POL	CHN
1	Davit Otiashvili (GEO)	2	2	0	6	12	—	8–6	4–2
2	Marek Garmulewicz (POL)	2	1	1	4	12	1–3 PP	—	6–2
3	E Yuhe (CHN)	2	0	2	2	4	1–3 PP	1–3 PP	—

Source: Official website

==== Pool 5 ====
Pos	Athlete	Pld	W	L	CP	TP	RUS	MGL	IND
1	David Musulbes (RUS)	2	2	0	7	16	—	5–1	11–0
2	Gelegjamtsyn Ösökhbayar (MGL)	2	1	1	4	5	1–3 PP	—	4–2
3	Jagdish Kaliraman (IND)	2	0	2	1	2	0–4 ST	1–3 PP	—

Source: Official website

==== Pool 6 ====
Pos	Athlete	Pld	W	L	CP	TP	UZB	SVK	SUI
1	Artur Taymazov (UZB)	2	2	0	7	19	—	9–0	10–0
2	Peter Pecha (SVK)	2	1	1	3	4	0–3 PO	—	4–1
3	Mirko Silian (SUI)	2	0	2	1	1	0–4 ST	1–3 PP	—

Source: Official website

==== Pool 7 ====
Pos	Athlete	Pld	W	L	CP	TP	TUR	IRI	UKR
1	Aydın Polatçı (TUR)	2	2	0	6	7	—	3–2	4–0
2	Alireza Rezaei (IRI)	2	1	1	4	6	1–3 PP	—	4–0
3	Serhii Priadun (UKR)	2	0	2	0	0	0–3 PO	0–3 PO	—

Source: Official website

==== Pool 8 ====
Pos	Athlete	Pld	W	L	CP	TP	GER	BLR	TKM
1	Markus Hamann (GER)	2	2	0	6	7	—	4–1	3–0
2	Barys Hrynkevich (BLR)	2	1	1	5	5	1–3 PP	—	4–0 Fall
3	Nurberdi Hekimow (TKM)	2	0	2	0	0	0–3 PO	0–4 TO	—

Source: Official website

=== Knockout round ===
Quarterfinals
Ottó Aubéli (HUN)	2
Alexis Rodríguez (CUB)	6
Ruslan Shikhsafiyev (KAZ)	1
Davit Otiashvili (GEO)	5
David Musulbes (RUS)	3
Artur Taymazov (UZB)	0
Aydın Polatçı (TUR)	3
Markus Hamann (GER)	0

Semifinals
Alexis Rodríguez (CUB)	7
Davit Otiashvili (GEO)	1
David Musulbes (RUS)	5
Aydın Polatçı (TUR)	1

Final
Alexis Rodríguez (CUB)	0
David Musulbes (RUS)	5
Bronze medal match
Davit Otiashvili (GEO)	0
Aydın Polatçı (TUR)	10
