= 2006 World Wrestling Championships – Men's freestyle 120 kg =

Men's freestyle 120 kg at the 2006 World Championships
- Venue: Tianhe Gymnasium
- Dates: 29 September 2006
- Competitors: 27 from 27 nations

Medalists
gold medal	Artur Taymazov	Uzbekistan
silver medal	Kuramagomed Kuramagomedov	Russia
bronze medal	Fardin Masoumi	Iran
bronze medal	Ruslan Basiev	Armenia

The men's freestyle 120 kilograms is a competition featured at the 2006 World Wrestling Championships, and was held at the Tianhe Gymnasium in Guangzhou, China on 29 September 2006.

This freestyle wrestling competition consists of a single-elimination tournament, with a repechage used to determine the winner of two bronze medals.

== Results ==
Legend

- F — Won by fall

=== Final ===
Final
Kuramagomed Kuramagomedov (RUS)	1	0
Artur Taymazov (UZB)	1	3

=== Top half ===
Round of 32
Eldar Kurtanidze (GEO)	2	4
Ioannis Papadopoulos (GRE)	0	0
Rareș Chintoan (ROM)	1	1
Fardin Masoumi (IRI)	1	8
Martin Siddiqui (GER)	0	0
Marid Mutalimov (KAZ)	1	2

Round of 16
Francis Villanueva (PHI)	0	0
Kuramagomed Kuramagomedov (RUS)	6	6
Davaanyamyn Lkhagvadorj (MGL)	1	0	4
Lee Se-hyung (KOR)	0	2	0
Tolly Thompson (USA)	3	1	2
Eldar Kurtanidze (GEO)	3	0	0
Fardin Masoumi (IRI)	2	5
Marid Mutalimov (KAZ)	1	1

Quarterfinals
Kuramagomed Kuramagomedov (RUS)	3	4
Davaanyamyn Lkhagvadorj (MGL)	1	1
Tolly Thompson (USA)	0	0
Fardin Masoumi (IRI)	2	1

Semifinals
Kuramagomed Kuramagomedov (RUS)	3	3
Fardin Masoumi (IRI)	1	0

=== Bottom half ===
Round of 32
Ottó Aubéli (HUN)	2	2
Katsuya Kitamura (JPN)	0	0
Denis Roberts (AUS)	0	0
Jamie Cox (CAN)	6	1
Ruslan Basiev (ARM)	1	1
Ivan Ishchenko (UKR)	0	0
José Cuba (ESP)	0	0
Artur Taymazov (UZB)	7	6
Maksim Mikhalevich (BLR)	0	1
Liang Lei (CHN)	1	3
Recep Kara (TUR)	7	6
Hà Văn Hiếu (VIE)	0	0
Naveen Singh Suhag (SUI)	0	0
Khizar Durgayev (AZE)	2	6
Hisham Abdelwahab (EGY)	0	0
Palwinder Singh Cheema (IND)	1	4

Round of 16
Ottó Aubéli (HUN)	1	1
Jamie Cox (CAN)	0	0
Ruslan Basiev (ARM)	0	0
Artur Taymazov (UZB)	1	1
Liang Lei (CHN)	0	0
Recep Kara (TUR)	1	1
Khizar Durgayev (AZE)	2	1	1
Palwinder Singh Cheema (IND)	0	2	0

Quarterfinals
Ottó Aubéli (HUN)	0	0
Artur Taymazov (UZB)	3	3
Recep Kara (TUR)	1	1
Khizar Durgayev (AZE)	0	0

Semifinals
Artur Taymazov (UZB)	3	5
Recep Kara (TUR)	0	0

=== Repechage ===
Repechage round 1
José Cuba (ESP)	0	0
Ruslan Basiev (ARM)	6	3

Repechage round 2
Francis Villanueva (PHI)	0
Davaanyamyn Lkhagvadorj (MGL)	3^{F}
Ruslan Basiev (ARM)	1	1
Ottó Aubéli (HUN)	0	0

Bronze medals
Davaanyamyn Lkhagvadorj (MGL)	1	0
Fardin Masoumi (IRI)	3	4
Ruslan Basiev (ARM)	0	1	1
Recep Kara (TUR)	3	0	0
