= Kyrgyzstan at the 2004 Summer Olympics =

- IOC code: KGZ
- NOC: National Olympic Committee of the Republic of Kyrgyzstan

in Athens
- Competitors: 29 in 9 sports
- Flag bearer: Mital Sharipov
- Medals: Gold 0 Silver 0 Bronze 0 Total 0

Summer Olympics appearances (overview)
- 1996; 2000; 2004; 2008; 2012; 2016; 2020; 2024

Other related appearances
- Russian Empire (1900–1912); Soviet Union (1952–1988); Unified Team (1992)

Kyrgyzstan competed at the 2004 Summer Olympics in Athens, Greece, from 13 to 29 August 2004. This was the nation's third appearance at the Olympics in the post-Soviet era.

The National Olympic Committee of the Republic of Kyrgyzstan sent the nation's smallest delegation to the Games. A total of 29 athletes, 22 men and 7 women, competed only in 9 sports. Eight Kyrgyzstani athletes had previously competed in Sydney, including 43-year-old marathon runner Irina Bogachova, Greco-Roman wrestler Gennady Chkhaidze, who finished fifth for his native country Georgia in the men's heavyweight division, and Asian Games silver medalist Evgeny Vakker in men's road cycling. Freestyle swimmer Ruslan Ismailov, aged 14, set the nation's Olympic milestone as the youngest ever athlete to compete at the Olympics. Weightlifter and 2000 Olympian Mital Sharipov was the nation's flag bearer in the opening ceremony.

For the second time in history, Kyrgyzstan failed to win a single Olympic medal in Athens.

== Athletics ==
Kyrgyzstani athletes have so far achieved qualifying standards in the following athletics events (up to a maximum of 3 athletes in each event at the 'A' Standard, and 1 at the 'B' Standard).

Key

- Note–Ranks given for track events are within the athlete's heat only
- Q = Qualified for the next round
- q = Qualified for the next round as a fastest loser or, in field events, by position without achieving the qualifying target
- NR = National record
- N/A = Round not applicable for the event
- Bye = Athlete not required to compete in round

Men
Track & road events

Athlete	Event	Final	
Athlete	Event	Result	Rank
Valery Pisarev	Marathon	2:40:10	79

Women
Track & road events

Athlete	Event	Heat		Quarterfinal		Semifinal		Final	
Athlete	Event	Result	Rank	Result	Rank	Result	Rank	Result	Rank
Elena Bobrovskaya	100 m	11.76	6	Did not advance					
Irina Bogachova	Marathon	—						DNF	
Tatiana Borisova	1500 m	4:13.36	14	—		Did not advance			
Oksana Luneva	400 m	52.94	6	—		Did not advance			
Galina Pedan	400 m hurdles	59.02	7	—		Did not advance			

Field events

Athlete	Event	Qualification		Final	
Athlete	Event	Distance	Position	Distance	Position
Tatiana Efimenko	High jump	1.89	=23	Did not advance	

== Boxing ==
Kyrgyzstan sent only two boxers to Athens.

Athlete	Event	Round of 32	Round of 16	Quarterfinals	Semifinals	Final	
Athlete	Event	Opposition Result	Opposition Result	Opposition Result	Opposition Result	Opposition Result	Rank
Aybek Abdymomunov	Bantamweight	Lassi (PAK); L 22–36	Did not advance				
Asylbek Talasbayev	Featherweight	Franco (CUB); L 15–32	Did not advance				

== Cycling ==
=== Road ===
Athlete	Event	Time	Rank
Evgeny Vakker	Men's road race	Did not finish	
Evgeny Vakker	Men's time trial	1:01:00.47	23

== Judo ==
Kyrgyzstan has qualified a single judoka.

Athlete	Event	Round of 32	Round of 16	Quarterfinals	Semifinals	Repechage 1	Repechage 2	Repechage 3	Final / BM	
Athlete	Event	Opposition Result	Opposition Result	Opposition Result	Opposition Result	Opposition Result	Opposition Result	Opposition Result	Opposition Result	Rank
Erkin Ibragimov	Men's −81 kg	Hawn (USA); L 0001–0010	Did not advance							

== Modern pentathlon ==
Two Kyrygzstani athletes qualified to compete in the modern pentathlon event through the Asian Championships.

Athlete	Event	Shooting (10 m air pistol)			Fencing (épée one touch)			Swimming (200 m freestyle)			Riding (show jumping)			Running (3000 m)			Total points	Final rank
Athlete	Event	Points	Rank	MP Points	Results	Rank	MP points	Time	Rank	MP points	Penalties	Rank	MP points	Time	Rank	MP Points	Total points	Final rank
Pavel Uvarov	Men's	181	8	1108	10–21	=31	664	2:13.26	27	1204	140	17	1060	10:05.95	21	980	5016	22
Liudmila Sirotkina	Women's	168	23	952	14–17	=19	776	2:26.92	20	1160	56	7	1144	11:46.95	26	896	4928	23

== Shooting ==
Kyrgyzstan has qualified a single shooter.

Men

Athlete	Event	Qualification		Final	
Athlete	Event	Points	Rank	Points	Rank
Aleksandr Babchenko	10 m air rifle	588	=33	Did not advance	
Aleksandr Babchenko	50 m rifle prone	591	=24	Did not advance	
Aleksandr Babchenko	50 m rifle 3 positions	1130	40	Did not advance	

== Swimming ==
Kyrgyzstani swimmers earned qualifying standards in the following events (up to a maximum of 2 swimmers in each event at the A-standard time, and 1 at the B-standard time):

Men

Athlete	Event	Heat		Semifinal		Final	
Athlete	Event	Time	Rank	Time	Rank	Time	Rank
Semen Danilov	50 m freestyle	26.61	=66	Did not advance			
Vasilii Danilov	400 m freestyle	4:15.32	44	—		Did not advance	
Ruslan Ismailov	200 m freestyle	2:01.53	59	Did not advance			
Anton Kramarenko	200 m breaststroke	2:28.59	46	Did not advance			
Yevgeny Petrashov	100 m breaststroke	1:07.78	55	Did not advance			
Iurii Zakharov	200 m backstroke	2:10.45	36	Did not advance			

== Weightlifting ==
Kyrgyzstan has qualified one weightlifter.

Athlete	Event	Snatch		Clean & Jerk		Total	Rank
Athlete	Event	Result	Rank	Result	Rank	Total	Rank
Ulanbek Moldodosov	Men's −85 kg	150	14	192.5	10	342.5	11

== Wrestling ==
Key

- VT - Victory by Fall.
- PP - Decision by Points - the loser with technical points.
- PO - Decision by Points - the loser without technical points.

Men's freestyle

Athlete	Event	Elimination Pool				Quarterfinal	Semifinal	Final / BM	
Athlete	Event	Opposition Result	Opposition Result	Opposition Result	Rank	Opposition Result	Opposition Result	Opposition Result	Rank
Ulan Nadyrbek Uulu	−60 kg	Wöller (HUN); W 3–0 ^{PO}	Fedoryshyn (UKR); L 1–3 ^{PP}	—	2	Did not advance			12
Aleksey Krupnyakov	−96 kg	Ibragimov (UZB); L 0–3 ^{PO}	Kochev (BUL); W 3–1 ^{PP}	—	2	Did not advance			15
Yury Mildzihov	−120 kg	Mutalimov (KAZ); W 3–1 ^{PP}	McCoy (USA); L 0–3 ^{PO}	Miano-Petta (ITA); L 0–5 ^{VB}	4	Did not advance			16

Men's Greco-Roman

Athlete	Event	Elimination Pool				Quarterfinal	Semifinal	Final / BM	
Athlete	Event	Opposition Result	Opposition Result	Opposition Result	Rank	Opposition Result	Opposition Result	Opposition Result	Rank
Uran Kalilov	−55 kg	Sheng J (CHN); L 1–3 ^{PP}	Kiouregkian (GRE); L 0–5 ^{VT}	Nyblom (DEN); L 0–3 ^{PO}	4	Did not advance			18
Kanatbek Begaliev	−66 kg	Zeidvand (IRI); L 0–3 ^{PO}	Sánchez (ESP); W 3–1 ^{PP}	—	2	Did not advance			11
Daniar Kobonov	−74 kg	Nagata (JPN); W 3–1 ^{PP}	Yli-Hannuksela (FIN); L 0–3 ^{PO}	—	2	Did not advance			14
Janarbek Kenjeev	−84 kg	Bátky (SVK); L 1–3 ^{PP}	Matsumoto (JPN); L 1–3 ^{PP}	Abrahamian (SWE); L 1–3 ^{PP}	4	Did not advance			13
Gennady Chkhaidze	−96 kg	Tarkong (PLW); W 4–0 ^{ST}	Dinchev (BUL); W 3–1 ^{PP}	—	1 Q	Hashemzadeh (IRI); L 1–3 ^{PP}	Did not advance	Peña (CUB); L 0–3 ^{PO}	5

== See also ==
- Kyrgyzstan at the 2002 Asian Games
- Kyrgyzstan at the 2004 Summer Paralympics
