= Wrestling at the 2004 Summer Olympics – Men's freestyle 120 kg =

Men's freestyle 120 kg at the Games of the XXVIII Olympiad
- Venue: Ano Liosia Olympic Hall
- Date: 27–28 August 2004
- Competitors: 20 from 20 nations

Medalists
1st place, gold medalist(s)		Artur Taymazov	Uzbekistan
2nd place, silver medalist(s)		Alireza Rezaei	Iran
3rd place, bronze medalist(s)		Aydın Polatçı	Turkey

The men's freestyle 120 kilograms at the 2004 Summer Olympics as part of the wrestling program were held at the Ano Liosia Olympic Hall, August 27 to August 28.

The competition held with an elimination system of three or four wrestlers in each pool, with the winners qualify for the quarterfinals, semifinals and final by way of direct elimination.

== Schedule ==
All times are Eastern European Summer Time (UTC+03:00)

Date	Time	Event
27 August 2004	09:30	Round 1
27 August 2004	09:30	Round 2
27 August 2004	17:30	Round 3
27 August 2004	17:30	Qualification
28 August 2004	09:30	Semifinals
28 August 2004	17:30	Finals

== Results ==
Legend

- F — Won by fall
- WO — Won by walkover

=== Elimination pools ===
==== Pool 1 ====
Pos	Athlete	Pld	W	L	CP	TP	Qualification
1	Artur Taymazov (UZB)	2	2	0	8	20	Knockout round
2	Marek Garmulewicz (POL)	2	1	1	3	6	
3	Palwinder Singh Cheema (IND)	2	0	2	1	4	

Source: Official website

	Score		CP
Artur Taymazov (UZB)	10–0	Marek Garmulewicz (POL)	4–0 ST
Palwinder Singh Cheema (IND)	0–10	Artur Taymazov (UZB)	0–4 ST
Marek Garmulewicz (POL)	6–4	Palwinder Singh Cheema (IND)	3–1 PP

==== Pool 2 ====
Pos	Athlete	Pld	W	L	CP	TP	Qualification
1	Kuramagomed Kuramagomedov (RUS)	2	2	0	6	11	Knockout round
2	Alex Modebadze (GEO)	2	1	1	3	5	
3	Ottó Aubéli (HUN)	2	0	2	0	0	

Source: Official website

	Score		CP
Ottó Aubéli (HUN)	0–6	Kuramagomed Kuramagomedov (RUS)	0–3 PO
Alex Modebadze (GEO)	5–0	Ottó Aubéli (HUN)	3–0 PO
Kuramagomed Kuramagomedov (RUS)	5–0	Alex Modebadze (GEO)	3–0 PO

==== Pool 3 ====
Pos	Athlete	Pld	W	L	CP	TP	Qualification
1	Alexis Rodríguez (CUB)	2	2	0	7	18	Knockout round
2	Nestoras Batzelas (GRE)	2	1	1	3	5	
3	Serhii Priadun (UKR)	2	0	2	0	0	

Source: Official website

	Score		CP
Alexis Rodríguez (CUB)	10–0	Nestoras Batzelas (GRE)	4–0 ST
Serhii Priadun (UKR)	0–8	Alexis Rodríguez (CUB)	0–3 PO
Nestoras Batzelas (GRE)	5–0	Serhii Priadun (UKR)	3–0 PO

==== Pool 4 ====
Pos	Athlete	Pld	W	L	CP	TP	Qualification
1	Aydın Polatçı (TUR)	2	2	0	7	15	Knockout round
2	Sven Thiele (GER)	2	1	1	4	5	
3	Rareș Chintoan (ROM)	2	0	2	0	0	

Source: Official website

	Score		CP
Rareș Chintoan (ROM)	0–4	Sven Thiele (GER)	0–3 PO
Aydın Polatçı (TUR)	10–0	Rareș Chintoan (ROM)	4–0 ST
Sven Thiele (GER)	1–5	Aydın Polatçı (TUR)	1–3 PP

==== Pool 5 ====
Pos	Athlete	Pld	W	L	CP	TP	Qualification
1	Marid Mutalimov (KAZ)	3	3	0	9	10	Knockout round
2	Kerry McCoy (USA)	3	2	1	7	12	
3	Francesco Miano-Petta (ITA)	3	1	2	4	0	
4	Yury Mildzihov (KGZ)	3	0	3	2	2	

Source: Official website

	Score		CP
Francesco Miano-Petta (ITA)	0–7	Kerry McCoy (USA)	0–3 PO
Marid Mutalimov (KAZ)	3–2	Yury Mildzihov (KGZ)	3–1 PP
Francesco Miano-Petta (ITA)	0–3	Marid Mutalimov (KAZ)	0–3 PO
Kerry McCoy (USA)	4–0	Yury Mildzihov (KGZ)	3–0 PO
Francesco Miano-Petta (ITA)	WO	Yury Mildzihov (KGZ)	4–0 PA
Kerry McCoy (USA)	1–4	Marid Mutalimov (KAZ)	1–3 PP

==== Pool 6 ====
Pos	Athlete	Pld	W	L	CP	TP	Qualification
1	Alireza Rezaei (IRI)	3	3	0	9	15	Knockout round
2	Bozhidar Boyadzhiev (BUL)	3	2	1	7	9	
3	Gelegjamtsyn Ösökhbayar (MGL)	3	1	2	3	6	
4	Barys Hrynkevich (BLR)	3	0	3	1	1	

Source: Official website

	Score		CP
Alireza Rezaei (IRI)	5–0	Bozhidar Boyadzhiev (BUL)	3–0 PO
Gelegjamtsyn Ösökhbayar (MGL)	6–0	Barys Hrynkevich (BLR)	3–0 PO
Alireza Rezaei (IRI)	3–0	Gelegjamtsyn Ösökhbayar (MGL)	3–0 PO
Bozhidar Boyadzhiev (BUL)	5–1	Barys Hrynkevich (BLR)	3–1 PP
Alireza Rezaei (IRI)	7–0	Barys Hrynkevich (BLR)	3–0 PO
Bozhidar Boyadzhiev (BUL)	4–0 Fall	Gelegjamtsyn Ösökhbayar (MGL)	4–0 TO

=== Knockout round ===
Qualification
Artur Taymazov (UZB)	7
Kuramagomed Kuramagomedov (RUS)	3
Alexis Rodríguez (CUB)	1
Aydın Polatçı (TUR)	3

Semifinals
Artur Taymazov (UZB)	3
Aydın Polatçı (TUR)	0
Marid Mutalimov (KAZ)	1
Alireza Rezaei (IRI)	4

Gold medal match
Artur Taymazov (UZB)	4^{F}
Alireza Rezaei (IRI)	0
Bronze medal match
Aydın Polatçı (TUR)	3
Marid Mutalimov (KAZ)	1

Classification 5–6
Kuramagomed Kuramagomedov (RUS)
Alexis Rodríguez (CUB)	WO

== Final standing ==
Rank	Athlete
1st place, gold medalist(s)	Artur Taymazov (UZB)
2nd place, silver medalist(s)	Alireza Rezaei (IRI)
3rd place, bronze medalist(s)	Aydın Polatçı (TUR)
4	Marid Mutalimov (KAZ)
5	Alexis Rodríguez (CUB)
6	Kuramagomed Kuramagomedov (RUS)
7	Kerry McCoy (USA)
8	Bozhidar Boyadzhiev (BUL)
9	Sven Thiele (GER)
10	Francesco Miano-Petta (ITA)
11	Marek Garmulewicz (POL)
12	Gelegjamtsyn Ösökhbayar (MGL)
13	Nestoras Batzelas (GRE)
14	Alex Modebadze (GEO)
15	Palwinder Singh Cheema (IND)
16	Yury Mildzihov (KGZ)
17	Barys Hrynkevich (BLR)
18	Ottó Aubéli (HUN)
19	Rareș Chintoan (ROM)
20	Serhii Priadun (UKR)
