= Wrestling at the 2006 Asian Games – Men's freestyle 120 kg =

Men's freestyle 120 kg at the 2006 Asian Games
- Venue: Aspire Hall 4
- Date: 14 December 2006
- Competitors: 12 from 12 nations

Medalists
gold medal	Artur Taymazov	Uzbekistan
silver medal	Fardin Masoumi	Iran
bronze medal	Lee Se-hyung	South Korea
bronze medal	Palwinder Singh Cheema	India

The men's freestyle 120 kilograms wrestling competition at the 2006 Asian Games in Doha was held on 14 December 2006 at the Aspire Hall 4.

This freestyle wrestling competition consisted of a single-elimination tournament, with a repechage used to determine the winner of two bronze medals. The two finalists faced off for gold and silver medals. Each wrestler who lost to one of the two finalists moved into the repechage, culminating in a pair of bronze medal matches featuring the semifinal losers each facing the remaining repechage opponent from their half of the bracket.

Each bout consisted of up to three rounds, lasting two minutes apiece. The wrestler who scored more points in each round was the winner of that rounds; the bout finished when one wrestler had won two rounds (and thus the match).

== Schedule ==
All times are Arabia Standard Time (UTC+03:00)

Date	Time	Event
Thursday, 14 December 2006	09:00	Preliminary
Thursday, 14 December 2006	09:00	Quarterfinals
Thursday, 14 December 2006	09:00	Semifinals
Thursday, 14 December 2006	09:00	Repechages
Thursday, 14 December 2006	18:00	Finals

== Results ==
Legend

- F — Won by fall

=== Main bracket ===
Preliminary
Palwinder Singh Cheema (IND)	1	6^{F}
Urmat Mustapaev (KGZ)	0	1
Fardin Masoumi (IRI)	2	3
Mohammed Jabr (IRQ)	0	0
Aissa Soliman (SYR)	1	1
Bashir Bhola Bhala (PAK)	1	1
Marid Mutalimov (KAZ)	3	3
Liang Lei (CHN)	0	0

Quarterfinals
Artur Taymazov (UZB)	6	5
Davaanyamyn Lkhagvadorj (MGL)	0	0
Dharma Raj Yadav (NEP)	0	0
Lee Se-hyung (KOR)	5	3
Palwinder Singh Cheema (IND)	1	0
Fardin Masoumi (IRI)	3	4
Bashir Bhola Bhala (PAK)	0	0
Marid Mutalimov (KAZ)	4	2

Semifinals
Artur Taymazov (UZB)	6	7
Lee Se-hyung (KOR)	0	0
Fardin Masoumi (IRI)	1	3
Marid Mutalimov (KAZ)	0	1

Gold medal match
Artur Taymazov (UZB)	8	5
Fardin Masoumi (IRI)	0	0

=== Repechage ===
Repechage
Mohammed Jabr (IRQ)	0	0
Palwinder Singh Cheema (IND)	3	3

Bronze medal match
Davaanyamyn Lkhagvadorj (MGL)	1
Lee Se-hyung (KOR)	3^{F}
Palwinder Singh Cheema (IND)	1	0	1
Marid Mutalimov (KAZ)	0	3	0

== Final standing ==
Rank	Athlete
1st place, gold medalist(s)	Artur Taymazov (UZB)
2nd place, silver medalist(s)	Fardin Masoumi (IRI)
3rd place, bronze medalist(s)	Lee Se-hyung (KOR)
3rd place, bronze medalist(s)	Palwinder Singh Cheema (IND)
5	Davaanyamyn Lkhagvadorj (MGL)
5	Marid Mutalimov (KAZ)
7	Bashir Bhola Bhala (PAK)
8	Aissa Soliman (SYR)
9	Urmat Mustapaev (KGZ)
10	Liang Lei (CHN)
11	Dharma Raj Yadav (NEP)
12	Mohammed Jabr (IRQ)
