= Wrestling at the 2002 Asian Games – Men's freestyle 120 kg =

Men's freestyle 120 kg at the 2002 Asian Games
- Venue: Yangsan Gymnasium
- Date: 6–7 October 2002
- Competitors: 11 from 11 nations

Medalists
gold medal	Artur Taymazov	Uzbekistan
silver medal	Abbas Jadidi	Iran
bronze medal	Palwinder Singh Cheema	India

The men's freestyle 120 kilograms wrestling competition at the 2002 Asian Games in Busan was held on 6 October and 7 October at the Yangsan Gymnasium.

The competition held with an elimination system of three or four wrestlers in each pool, with the winners qualify for the semifinals and final by way of direct elimination.

== Schedule ==
All times are Korea Standard Time (UTC+09:00)

Date	Time	Event
Sunday, 6 October 2002	10:00	Round 1
Sunday, 6 October 2002	10:00	Round 2
Sunday, 6 October 2002	16:00	Round 3
Sunday, 6 October 2002	16:00	Repechage 1
Sunday, 6 October 2002	16:00	Repechage 2
Monday, 7 October 2002	10:00	Repechage 3
Monday, 7 October 2002	10:00	1/2 finals
Monday, 7 October 2002	16:00	Finals

== Results ==
Legend

- F — Won by fall

=== Preliminary ===
==== Pool 1 ====
Pos	Athlete	Pld	W	L	CP	TP	Qualification
1	Shin Jung-hoon (KOR)	2	2	0	6	11	Knockout round
2	Akihito Tanaka (JPN)	2	1	1	5	13	Repechage
3	Mohammad Alam Nooristani (AFG)	2	0	2	0	0	

Source: Report

	Score		CP
Shin Jung-hoon (KOR)	4–2	Akihito Tanaka (JPN)	3–1 PP
Mohammad Alam Nooristani (AFG)	0–7	Shin Jung-hoon (KOR)	0–3 PO
Akihito Tanaka (JPN)	11–0	Mohammad Alam Nooristani (AFG)	4–0 ST

==== Pool 2 ====
Pos	Athlete	Pld	W	L	CP	TP	Qualification
1	Artur Taymazov (UZB)	3	3	0	12	31	Knockout round
2	Palwinder Singh Cheema (IND)	3	2	1	8	14	Repechage
3	Gelegjamtsyn Ösökhbayar (MGL)	3	1	2	4	15	
4	Nurberdi Hekimow (TKM)	3	0	3	0	0	

Source: Report

	Score		CP
Artur Taymazov (UZB)	10–0	Palwinder Singh Cheema (IND)	4–0 ST
Gelegjamtsyn Ösökhbayar (MGL)	10–0	Nurberdi Hekimow (TKM)	4–0 ST
Artur Taymazov (UZB)	11–0	Gelegjamtsyn Ösökhbayar (MGL)	4–0 ST
Palwinder Singh Cheema (IND)	10–0	Nurberdi Hekimow (TKM)	4–0 ST
Artur Taymazov (UZB)	10–0	Nurberdi Hekimow (TKM)	4–0 ST
Palwinder Singh Cheema (IND)	4–5 Fall	Gelegjamtsyn Ösökhbayar (MGL)	4–0 TO

==== Pool 3 ====
Pos	Athlete	Pld	W	L	CP	TP	Qualification
1	Abbas Jadidi (IRI)	3	3	0	11	26	Knockout round
2	Li Jinlong (CHN)	3	2	1	8	17	Repechage
3	Ismail Jamal (QAT)	3	1	2	5	15	
4	Francis Villanueva (PHI)	3	0	3	1	1	

Source: Report

	Score		CP
Abbas Jadidi (IRI)	11–0	Francis Villanueva (PHI)	4–0 ST
Li Jinlong (CHN)	5–3	Ismail Jamal (QAT)	3–1 PP
Abbas Jadidi (IRI)	5–1	Li Jinlong (CHN)	3–1 PP
Francis Villanueva (PHI)	1–12	Ismail Jamal (QAT)	1–4 SP
Abbas Jadidi (IRI)	10–0	Ismail Jamal (QAT)	4–0 ST
Francis Villanueva (PHI)	0–11	Li Jinlong (CHN)	0–4 ST

=== Repechage ===
Pos	Athlete	Pld	W	L	CP	TP	Qualification
1	Palwinder Singh Cheema (IND)	2	2	0	7	20	Knockout round
2	Li Jinlong (CHN)	2	1	1	5	16	
3	Akihito Tanaka (JPN)	2	0	2	1	1	

Source: Report

	Score		CP
Akihito Tanaka (JPN)	1–11	Palwinder Singh Cheema (IND)	1–4 SP
Li Jinlong (CHN)	10–0	Akihito Tanaka (JPN)	4–0 ST
Palwinder Singh Cheema (IND)	9–6	Li Jinlong (CHN)	3–1 PP

=== Knockout round ===
1/2 finals
Shin Jung-hoon (KOR)	0
Artur Taymazov (UZB)	10
Abbas Jadidi (IRI)	5^{F}
Palwinder Singh Cheema (IND)	0

Final
Artur Taymazov (UZB)	10
Abbas Jadidi (IRI)	0
3rd–4th place
Shin Jung-hoon (KOR)	0
Palwinder Singh Cheema (IND)	10

== Final standing ==
Rank	Athlete
1st place, gold medalist(s)	Artur Taymazov (UZB)
2nd place, silver medalist(s)	Abbas Jadidi (IRI)
3rd place, bronze medalist(s)	Palwinder Singh Cheema (IND)
4	Shin Jung-hoon (KOR)
5	Li Jinlong (CHN)
6	Akihito Tanaka (JPN)
7	Ismail Jamal (QAT)
8	Gelegjamtsyn Ösökhbayar (MGL)
9	Francis Villanueva (PHI)
10	Nurberdi Hekimow (TKM)
11	Mohammad Alam Nooristani (AFG)
