= Nestoras Batzelas =

Greek wrestler

Personal information
- Full name: Nestoras Batzelas
- Nationality: Greek
- Born: 7 January 1980 (age 46) Larissa, Thessalia, Greece
- Height: 1.85 m (6 ft 1 in)
- Weight: 120 kg (265 lb)

Sport
- Style: Freestyle
- Club: E.A. Larissa
- Coach: Konstantinos Avramis

Nestoras Batzelas
- Other names: Titan

Mixed martial arts record
- Total: 8
- Wins: 6
- By knockout: 3
- By submission: 3
- Losses: 2
- By knockout: 1
- By decision: 1

Other information
- Mixed martial arts record from Sherdog

Nestoras Batzelas (Greek: Νέστορας Μπατζέλας; born January 7, 1980, in Larissa, Thessalia) is a Greek MMA fighter and retired amateur freestyle wrestler, who competed in the men's super heavyweight category. Batzelas has been selected to the nation's Olympic wrestling team when Greece hosted the 2004 Summer Olympics in Athens, and also trained as a member of the wrestling team for E.A. Larissa, under his personal coach Konstantinos Avramis.

Batzelas qualified for the Greek squad in the men's super heavyweight class (120 kg), when Greece welcomed the world to the 2004 Summer Olympics in Athens. He filled up an entry by the International Federation of Association Wrestling and the Hellenic Olympic Committee, as Greece received an automatic berth for being the host nation. He lost his opening match to 2000 Olympic bronze medalist Alexis Rodríguez of Cuba on technical superiority, but bounced back to dismantle Ukraine's Serhii Priadun with a 5–0 decision in front of the home crowd inside Ano Liossia Olympic Hall. Placing second in the prelim pool and thirteenth overall, Batzelas' performance fell short to put him further into the quarterfinals.

== Championships and accomplishments ==
=== MMA ===
- No Limits
  - No Limits Heavyweight Champion (1 Time)

== Professional mixed martial arts record ==
Professional record breakdown
9 matches	7 wins	2 losses
By knockout	3	1
By submission	4	0
By decision	0	1

Res.	Record	Opponent	Method	Event	Date	Round	Time	Location	Notes
Loss	6-2	Ioannis Arzoumanidis	Decision (Unanimous)	MMA Challenge Pro 2	September 13, 2014	3	5:00	Thessaloniki, Greece	For MMA Challenge Pro Heavyweight Championship.
Win	6-1	George Katsinopoulos	TKO (Punches)	No Limits 23	May 11, 2014	3		Athens, Greece	Wins No Limits Heavyweight Championship.
Loss	5–1	Ricco Rodriguez	TKO (punches)	Final Fight Championship 10	December 13, 2013	2	3:33	Skopje, North Macedonia	
Win	5-0	Julian Chilikov	Submission (Guillotine Choke)	GFC - Greek Fighting Championship 4	May 18, 2013	1		Larissa, Greece	
Win	4-0	Emil Zahariev	Submission (Heel Hook)	No Limits 20	December 1, 2012	1		Athens, Greece	
Win	3-0	Emil Zahariev	TKO (RTD)		May 2012	1	5:00	Thessaloniki, Greece	
Win	2-0	Borislav Balabanov	TKO (Punches)	Throwdown MMA Championship	February 18, 2012	1		Greece	
Win	1-0	Marian Rusu	Submission (Punches)	GFC - Greek Fighting Championship 2	June 4, 2011	1	3:27	Athens, Greece	

== Amateur mixed martial arts record ==
Professional record breakdown
1 match	0 wins	1 loss
By knockout	0	1
By submission	0	0
By decision	0	0

Res.	Record	Opponent	Method	Event	Date	Round	Time	Location	Notes
Loss	0-1	Allen Crowder	TKO (Referee Stoppage)	Battle In The South VI	May 31, 2013	1	1:26	Wilmington, North Carolina, United States	Fight was for the Heavyweight Title.
