= Disney Rodríguez =

Cuban freestyle wrestler

Personal information
- Born: 27 September 1985 (age 41)

Sport
- Sport: Freestyle wrestling
Medal record
Men's freestyle wrestling
Representing Cuba
Olympic Games
Bronze medal – third place	2008 Beijing	120 kg
Pan American Games
Bronze medal – third place	2011 Guadalajara	120 kg
Central American and Caribbean Games
Gold medal – first place	2006 Cartagena	120 kg

Disney Rodríguez Valera (born 27 September 1985) is a Cuban freestyle wrestler. He competed in the freestyle 120 kg event at the 2008 Summer Olympics, where he lost the bronze medal match to David Musul'bes. After Artur Taymazov, who defeated Rodríguez in the quarterfinals, was positively tested for banned substance in his urine sample and disqualified, Rodríguez moved to 3rd place and was awarded a bronze medal.
