= Wrestling at the 2008 Summer Olympics – Men's freestyle 120 kg =

Men's freestyle 120 kg at the Games of the XXIX Olympiad
- Venue: China Agricultural University Gymnasium
- Date: 21 August 2008
- Competitors: 20 from 20 nations

Medalists
1st place, gold medalist(s)		Bakhtiyar Akhmedov	Russia
2nd place, silver medalist(s)		David Musuľbes	Slovakia
3rd place, bronze medalist(s)		Disney Rodríguez	Cuba
3rd place, bronze medalist(s)		Marid Mutalimov	Kazakhstan

Men's freestyle 120 kilograms competition at the 2008 Summer Olympics in Beijing, China, was held on 21 August at the China Agricultural University Gymnasium.

This freestyle wrestling competition consists of a single-elimination tournament, with a repechage used to determine the winner of two bronze medals. The two finalists face off for gold and silver medals. Each wrestler who loses to one of the two finalists moves into the repechage, culminating in a pair of bronze medal matches featuring the semifinal losers each facing the remaining repechage opponent from their half of the bracket.

Each bout consists of up to three rounds, lasting two minutes apiece. The wrestler who scores more points in each round is the winner of that round; the bout ends when one wrestler has won two rounds (and thus the match).

On 5 April 2017, Artur Taymazov of Uzbekistan was stripped of the gold medal due to a positive doping test.

== Schedule ==
All times are China Standard Time (UTC+08:00)

Date	Time	Event
21 August 2008	09:30	Qualification rounds
21 August 2008	16:00	Repechage
21 August 2008	17:00	Finals

== Results ==
Legend

- F — Won by fall

=== Final ===
Final
Artur Taymazov (UZB)	3	1
Bakhtiyar Akhmedov (RUS)	0	0

=== Top half ===
Qualifications

1/8 finals
Ali Isayev (AZE)	0	3
Artur Taymazov (UZB)	2	4
Rareș Chintoan (ROU)	0	0
Disney Rodríguez (CUB)	5	4
David Musuľbes (SVK)	3	6
Wilson Siewari (NGR)	0	0
Florian Skilang Temengil (PLW)	0	1
Ottó Aubéli (HUN)	4	7

Quarterfinals
Artur Taymazov (UZB)	3	4
Disney Rodríguez (CUB)	1	0
David Musuľbes (SVK)	2	2
Ottó Aubéli (HUN)	1	0

Semifinals
Artur Taymazov (UZB)	1	1
David Musuľbes (SVK)	0	0

=== Bottom half ===
Qualifications
Steve Mocco (USA)	1	3
Rajiv Tomar (IND)	0	0
Bartłomiej Bartnicki (POL)	1	2
Liang Lei (CHN)	1	2
Bozhidar Boyadzhiev (BUL)	0	0
Bakhtiyar Akhmedov (RUS)	2	2
Lawrence Langowski (MEX)	0	0
Fardin Masoumi (IRI)	6	6

1/8 finals
Kim Jae-gang (KOR)	1	0
Marid Mutalimov (KAZ)	1	2
Ivan Ishchenko (UKR)	3	0	0
Aydın Polatçı (TUR)	0	1	1
Steve Mocco (USA)	1	3
Liang Lei (CHN)	0	0
Bakhtiyar Akhmedov (RUS)	4^{F}
Fardin Masoumi (IRI)	0

Quarterfinals
Marid Mutalimov (KAZ)	1	1	2
Aydın Polatçı (TUR)	0	2	0
Steve Mocco (USA)	1	0	0
Bakhtiyar Akhmedov (RUS)	0	1	2

Semifinals
Marid Mutalimov (KAZ)	0	0
Bakhtiyar Akhmedov (RUS)	6	1

=== Repechage ===
Repechage round 1
Bozhidar Boyadzhiev (BUL)	1	0	2
Fardin Masoumi (IRI)	0	2	4

Repechage round 2
Ali Isayev (AZE)	0	0
Disney Rodríguez (CUB)	1	4^{F}
Fardin Masoumi (IRI)	3	4
Steve Mocco (USA)	1	1

Bronze medals
Disney Rodríguez (CUB)	0	2
David Musuľbes (SVK)	4	4
Fardin Masoumi (IRI)	3	1
Marid Mutalimov (KAZ)	8	1

== Final standing ==
Rank	Athlete
1st place, gold medalist(s)	Bakhtiyar Akhmedov (RUS)
2nd place, silver medalist(s)	David Musuľbes (SVK)
3rd place, bronze medalist(s)	Disney Rodríguez (CUB)
3rd place, bronze medalist(s)	Marid Mutalimov (KAZ)
5	Fardin Masoumi (IRI)
6	Steve Mocco (USA)
7	Ottó Aubéli (HUN)
8	Aydın Polatçı (TUR)
9	Liang Lei (CHN)
10	Ivan Ishchenko (UKR)
11	Bartłomiej Bartnicki (POL)
12	Bozhidar Boyadzhiev (BUL)
13	Ali Isayev (AZE)
14	Kim Jae-gang (KOR)
15	Florian Skilang Temengil (PLW)
16	Rajiv Tomar (IND)
17	Rareș Chintoan (ROU)
17	Wilson Siewari (NGR)
19	Lawrence Langowski (MEX)
DQ	Artur Taymazov (UZB)

- Artur Taymazov of Uzbekistan originally won the gold medal, but was disqualified after he tested positive for Chlorodehydromethyltestosterone and Stanozolol.
