= Yury Mildzihov =

Russian-Kyrgyzstani freestyle wrestler

Personal information
- Full name: Yury Mildzihov
- Nationality: Kyrgyzstan; Russia
- Born: 15 June 1968 Vladikavkaz, Russian SFSR, Soviet Union
- Died: 25 February 2008 (aged 39) Vladikavkaz, Russia
- Height: 1.80 m (5 ft 11 in)
- Weight: 116 kg (256 lb)

Sport
- Style: Freestyle

Yury Mildzihov (Russian: Юрий Мильдзихов; 15 June 1968 – 25 February 2008) was an amateur Russian-born Kyrgyzstani freestyle wrestler, who competed in the men's super heavyweight category. He was born in Bishkek.

Mildzihov qualified for the Kyrgyz squad in the men's 120 kg class at the 2004 Summer Olympics in Athens by finishing fourth and receiving a berth from the Olympic Qualification Tournament in Sofia, Bulgaria. He lost his opening match to neighboring Kazakhstan's Marid Mutalimov and endured a 4–0 defeat from U.S. wrestler and Olympic veteran Kerry McCoy, that left him injured on his left leg and unable to compete against Italy's Francesco Miano-Petta on his final bout of the prelim pool. Placing him at the bottom of the pool and sixteenth in the final standings, Mildzihov failed to advance to the quarterfinals.
