= Wrestling at the 1998 Asian Games – Men's freestyle 130 kg =

Men's freestyle 130 kg at the 1998 Asian Games
- Venue: Thammasat Gymnasium 1
- Dates: 17–18 December 1998
- Competitors: 9 from 9 nations

Medalists
gold medal	Alireza Rezaei	Iran
silver medal	Georgy Kaysinov	Uzbekistan
bronze medal	Gelegjamtsyn Ösökhbayar	Mongolia

The men's freestyle 130 kilograms wrestling competition at the 1998 Asian Games in Bangkok was held on 17 December and 18 December at the Thammasat Gymnasium 1.

The gold and silver medalists were determined by the final match of the main single-elimination bracket. The losers advanced to the repechage. These matches determined the bronze medalist for the event.

== Schedule ==
All times are Indochina Time (UTC+07:00)

Date	Time	Event
Thursday, 17 December 1998	09:00	Round 1
Thursday, 17 December 1998	16:00	Round 2
Friday, 18 December 1998	09:00	Round 3
Friday, 18 December 1998	09:00	Round 4
Friday, 18 December 1998	16:00	Finals

== Results ==
=== Round 1 ===
	Score		CP
1/8 finals
Jagdish Singh (IND)	0–3 Fall	Igor Klimov (KAZ)	0–4 TO
Feng Aigang (CHN)	3–0	Kim Tae-ho (KOR)	3–0 PO
Hiroyuki Obata (JPN)	9–0 Fall	Ariel Bugagao (PHI)	4–0 TO
Gelegjamtsyn Ösökhbayar (MGL)	0–4	Alireza Rezaei (IRI)	0–3 PO
Georgy Kaysinov (UZB)		Bye	

=== Round 2 ===
	Score		CP
Quarterfinals
Georgy Kaysinov (UZB)	3–1	Igor Klimov (KAZ)	3–1 PP
Feng Aigang (CHN)		Bye	
Hiroyuki Obata (JPN)		Bye	
Alireza Rezaei (IRI)		Bye	
Repechage
Jagdish Singh (IND)	5–2 Fall	Kim Tae-ho (KOR)	4–0 TO
Ariel Bugagao (PHI)	0–12	Gelegjamtsyn Ösökhbayar (MGL)	0–4 ST

=== Round 3 ===
	Score		CP
Semifinals
Georgy Kaysinov (UZB)	4–0	Feng Aigang (CHN)	3–0 PO
Hiroyuki Obata (JPN)	0–10	Alireza Rezaei (IRI)	4–0 ST
Repechage
Jagdish Singh (IND)	0–5	Gelegjamtsyn Ösökhbayar (MGL)	0–3 PO
Igor Klimov (KAZ)		Bye	

=== Round 4 ===
	Score		CP
Repechage
Feng Aigang (CHN)	1–3	Igor Klimov (KAZ)	1–3 PP
Gelegjamtsyn Ösökhbayar (MGL)	10–0	Hiroyuki Obata (JPN)	4–0 ST

=== Finals ===
	Score		CP
Bronze medal match
Igor Klimov (KAZ)	1–7	Gelegjamtsyn Ösökhbayar (MGL)	1–7 PP
Gold medal match
Georgy Kaysinov (UZB)	0–2	Alireza Rezaei (IRI)	0–3 PO

== Final standing ==
Rank	Athlete
1st place, gold medalist(s)	Alireza Rezaei (IRI)
2nd place, silver medalist(s)	Georgy Kaysinov (UZB)
3rd place, bronze medalist(s)	Gelegjamtsyn Ösökhbayar (MGL)
4	Igor Klimov (KAZ)
5	Hiroyuki Obata (JPN)
6	Feng Aigang (CHN)
7	Jagdish Singh (IND)
8	Kim Tae-ho (KOR)
9	Ariel Bugagao (PHI)
