= Pryadun =

Pryadun or Priadun (Ukrainian: Прядун) is a Ukrainian surname. Notable people with the surname include:

- Maksym Pryadun (born 1997), Ukrainian footballer
- Serhii Priadun (born 1974), Ukrainian freestyle wrestler
