= Sergiu Postică =

Moldovan swimmer

Personal information
- Full name: Sergiu Postică
- National team: Moldova
- Born: 17 May 1985 (age 41) Chişinău, Moldovan SSR, Soviet Union
- Height: 1.86 m (6 ft 1 in)
- Weight: 78 kg (172 lb)

Sport
- Sport: Swimming
- Strokes: Breaststroke

Sergiu Postică (born May 17, 1985) is a Moldovan former swimmer, who specialized in breaststroke events. He is a two-time Olympian (2004 and 2008) and a multiple-time Moldovan record holder in the 100 and 200 m breaststroke.

Postică made his first Moldovan team at the 2004 Summer Olympics in Athens, where he competed in the men's 200 m breaststroke. He edged out Kyrgyzstan's Anton Kramarenko to take a sixth spot and forty-fifth overall by more than a second in 2:27.21.

At the 2008 Summer Olympics in Beijing, Postică qualified for the men's 100 m breaststroke by eclipsing a FINA B-standard entry time of 1:03.71 from the Russian Open Championships in Saint Petersburg. He challenged five other swimmers on the second heat, including two-time Olympian Nguyễn Hữu Việt of Vietnam. Postică raced to second place by 0.11 of a second behind Panama's Édgar Crespo in 1:03.83. Postică failed to advance into the semifinals, as he placed fifty-fourth overall on the first night of preliminaries.
