= Modebadze =

Modebadze (Georgian: მოდებაძე) is a Georgian surname. Notable people with the surname include:

- Alex Modebadze (born 1978), Georgian freestyle wrestler
- Irakli Modebadze (born 1984), Georgian footballer
- Mirian Modebadze (born 1997), Georgian rugby union player
