= Swimming at the 2004 Summer Olympics – Men's 200 metre breaststroke =

Men's 200 metre breaststroke at the Games of the XXVIII Olympiad
- Venue: Olympic Aquatic Centre
- Date: August 17, 2004 (heats and semifinals); August 18, 2004 (final)
- Competitors: 47 from 39 nations
- Winning time: 2:09.44 OR

Medalists
1st place, gold medalist(s)		Kosuke Kitajima	Japan
2nd place, silver medalist(s)		Dániel Gyurta	Hungary
3rd place, bronze medalist(s)		Brendan Hansen	United States

The men's 200 metre breaststroke event at the 2004 Olympic Games was contested at the Olympic Aquatic Centre of the Athens Olympic Sports Complex in Athens, Greece on August 17 and 18.

After missing out on the semifinals in Sydney four years earlier, Japan's Kosuke Kitajima shattered one of the longest-standing Olympic swimming records when he clocked 2:09.44, erasing a 0.77-second mark by American swimmer Mike Barrowman in 1992. This achievement secured a breaststroke double for the second consecutive time. In a surprise turn of events, 15-year-old Dániel Gyurta of Hungary claimed the silver medal with a time of 2:10.80, narrowly edging out U.S. swimmer Brendan Hansen in a close race by 0.07 of a second. Hansen, who had broke Kitajima's world record at the U.S. Olympic trials one month earlier, finished third in 2:10.87.

== Records ==
Prior to this competition, the existing world and Olympic records were as follows.

World record	Brendan Hansen (USA)	2:09.04	Long Beach, United States	11 July 2004
Olympic record	Mike Barrowman (USA)	2:10.16	Barcelona, Spain	29 July 1992

The following new world and Olympic records were set during this competition.

Date	Event	Name	Nationality	Time	Record
August 18	Final	Kosuke Kitajima	Japan	2:09.44	OR

== Results ==
=== Heats ===
Rank	Heat	Lane	Name	Nationality	Time	Notes
1	6	2	Dániel Gyurta	Hungary	2:11.29	Q
2	4	4	Kosuke Kitajima	Japan	2:11.97	Q
3	4	5	Paolo Bossini	Italy	2:12.09	Q
4	4	3	Mike Brown	Canada	2:12.69	Q
5	6	4	Brendan Hansen	United States	2:12.77	Q
6	5	8	Vladislav Polyakov	Kazakhstan	2:12.96	Q
7	6	3	Ian Edmond	Great Britain	2:13.08	Q
8	5	3	Grigory Falko	Russia	2:13.45	Q
9	5	5	Scott Usher	United States	2:13.59	Q
10	6	5	Jim Piper	Australia	2:13.79	Q
11	5	6	Genki Imamura	Japan	2:14.10	Q
12	4	1	Terence Parkin	South Africa	2:14.12	Q
13	5	2	Maxim Podoprigora	Austria	2:14.31	Q
14	6	7	Richárd Bodor	Hungary	2:14.36	Q
15	2	4	Lai Zhongjian	China	2:14.61	Q
16	4	6	Chris Cook	Great Britain	2:14.68	Q
17	5	4	Dmitry Komornikov	Russia	2:14.92	
18	4	8	Jens Kruppa	Germany	2:15.29	
19	3	2	Ratapong Sirisanont	Thailand	2:15.39	
20	3	3	Valeriy Dymo	Ukraine	2:15.52	
21	3	4	Jakob Jóhann Sveinsson	Iceland	2:15.60	
22	6	8	Michael Williamson	Ireland	2:15.75	
23	4	2	Regan Harrison	Australia	2:15.86	
24	2	1	Eduardo Fischer	Brazil	2:16.04	
25	5	1	Hugues Duboscq	France	2:16.56	
26	5	7	Thijs van Valkengoed	Netherlands	2:16.80	
27	6	1	Martin Gustavsson	Sweden	2:17.12	
28	2	5	Mihail Alexandrov	Bulgaria	2:17.19	
29	6	6	Morgan Knabe	Canada	2:17.20	
30	3	6	Daniel Málek	Czech Republic	2:17.47	
31	2	6	Sofiane Daid	Algeria	2:17.78	
32	3	7	Aleksander Baldin	Estonia	2:17.90	
33	3	8	Romanos Alyfantis	Greece	2:18.18	
34	2	8	Andrey Morkovin	Uzbekistan	2:18.48	
35	1	3	Bradley Ally	Barbados	2:18.64	
36	2	2	Emil Tahirovič	Slovenia	2:18.65	
37	3	1	Vanja Rogulj	Croatia	2:18.81	
38	1	1	Miguel Molina	Philippines	2:19.19	
39	2	3	Ben Labowitch	New Zealand	2:19.25	
40	4	7	Loris Facci	Italy	2:19.38	
41	2	7	Tam Chi Kin	Hong Kong	2:19.48	
42	1	4	Wang Wei-wen	Chinese Taipei	2:20.65	
43	1	5	Malick Fall	Senegal	2:22.31	
44	1	2	Edvinas Dautartas	Lithuania	2:23.12	
45	1	7	Sergiu Postica	Moldova	2:27.21	
46	1	6	Anton Kramarenko	Kyrgyzstan	2:28.59	
	3	5	Jarno Pihlava	Finland	DNS	

=== Semifinals ===
==== Semifinal 1 ====
Rank	Lane	Name	Nationality	Time	Notes
1	4	Kosuke Kitajima	Japan	2:10.86	Q
2	5	Mike Brown	Canada	2:12.14	Q
3	3	Vladislav Polyakov	Kazakhstan	2:12.19	Q
4	2	Jim Piper	Australia	2:12.22	Q
5	6	Grigory Falko	Russia	2:12.42	
6	1	Richárd Bodor	Hungary	2:12.76	
7	7	Terence Parkin	South Africa	2:13.58	
8	8	Chris Cook	Great Britain	2:15.91	

==== Semifinal 2 ====
Rank	Lane	Name	Nationality	Time	Notes
1	4	Dániel Gyurta	Hungary	2:10.75	Q
2	3	Brendan Hansen	United States	2:10.81	Q
3	5	Paolo Bossini	Italy	2:11.76	Q
4	2	Scott Usher	United States	2:12.00	Q
5	7	Genki Imamura	Japan	2:12.86	
6	1	Maxim Podoprigora	Austria	2:14.66	
7	8	Lai Zhongjian	China	2:14.94	
	6	Ian Edmond	Great Britain	DSQ	

=== Final ===
Rank	Lane	Swimmer	Nation	Time	Notes
1st place, gold medalist(s)	3	Kosuke Kitajima	Japan	2:09.44	OR
2nd place, silver medalist(s)	4	Dániel Gyurta	Hungary	2:10.80	
3rd place, bronze medalist(s)	5	Brendan Hansen	United States	2:10.87	
4	6	Paolo Bossini	Italy	2:11.20	
5	1	Vladislav Polyakov	Kazakhstan	2:11.76	
6	7	Mike Brown	Canada	2:11.94	
7	2	Scott Usher	United States	2:11.95	
	8	Jim Piper	Australia	DSQ	
