= Aleksander Baldin =

Estonian swimmer

Aleksandr Baldin
Personal information
- Full name: Aleksandr Baldin
- National team: Estonia
- Born: 31 August 1984 (age 41) Tallinn, then part of Estonian SSR, Soviet Union
- Height: 1.84 m (6 ft 0 in)
- Weight: 80 kg (176 lb)

Sport
- Sport: Swimming
- Strokes: Breaststroke
- Club: SK Garant
- Coach: Dmitri Kapelin

Aleksandr Baldin (born August 31, 1984) is an Estonian former swimmer, who specialized in breaststroke events. He is a 15-time long-course Estonian swimming champion in the breaststroke (50, 100, and 200), and a member of SK Garant in Tallinn, under the tutelage of his personal coach Dmitri Kapelin. Baldin also represented his nation Estonia in a breaststroke double at the 2004 Summer Olympics.

Baldin qualified for two swimming events at the 2004 Summer Olympics in Athens, by eclipsing FINA B-standard entry times of 1:04.50 (100 m breaststroke) and 2:16.73 (200 m breaststroke) from the Russian Championships in Moscow. In the 100 m breaststroke, Baldin raced to seventh place and forty-ninth overall on the third heat by half a second (0.50) behind Cyprus' Kyriakos Dimosthenous in 1:06.04. In the 200 m breaststroke, Baldin challenged seven other swimmers on the same heat, including Olympic veterans Ratapong Sirisanont of Thailand and Daniel Málek of the Czech Republic. Baldin took a sixth spot in his heat by 0.43 of a second behind Malek in 2:17.90. Baldin failed to advance into the semifinals, as he placed thirty-second overall in the preliminaries.
