= Wilson Siewari =

Nigerian freestyle wrestler

Personal information
- Nationality: Nigeria
- Born: 16 July 1973 (age 53)
- Height: 1.80 m (5 ft 11 in)
- Weight: 110 kg (243 lb)

Sport
- Sport: Wrestling
- Event: Freestyle
- Coached by: Daniel Igali
Medal record
Men's freestyle wrestling
Representing Nigeria
All-Africa Games
Gold medal – first place	2007 Algiers	120 kg
Bronze medal – third place	2003 Abuja	120 kg

Wilson Siewari (born 16 July 1973) is an amateur Nigerian freestyle wrestler, who played for the men's super heavyweight category. He is a two-time medalist at the All-Africa Games, and trains under his personal and head coach Daniel Igali, a former Nigerian-born Canadian wrestler who won gold medals at the 2000 Summer Olympics in Sydney, and at the 2002 Commonwealth Games in Manchester.

Siewari represented Nigeria at the 2008 Summer Olympics in Beijing, where he competed for the 120 kg class in men's freestyle wrestling. He lost his first preliminary match to former Olympic champion and Russian-born wrestler David Musuľbes of Slovakia, who was able to score only nine points ahead of him in three successive periods.
