= Ivan Ishchenko =

Ukrainian freestyle wrestler

Personal information
- Full name: Ivan Ivanovych Ishchenko
- Nationality: Ukraine
- Born: 19 May 1980 (age 46) Mykolaiv, Ukrainian SSR, Soviet Union
- Height: 1.94 m (6 ft 4 1/2 in)
- Weight: 120 kg (265 lb)

Sport
- Sport: Wrestling
- Event: Freestyle
- Club: Dynamo-Osvita Mykolaïv
- Coached by: Ruslan Savlokhov
Medal record
Men's freestyle wrestling
Representing Ukraine
European Championships
Silver medal – second place	2006 Moscow	120 kg

Ivan Ivanovych Ishchenko (Ukrainian: Іван Іванович Іщенко; born May 19, 1980, in Mykolaiv) is an amateur Ukrainian freestyle wrestler, who played for the men's super heavyweight category. He won a silver medal for his division at the 2006 European Wrestling Championships in Moscow, Russia, losing out to Russia's Kuramagomed Kuramagomedov. Ishchenko is a member of the wrestling team for Dynamo-Osvita Mykolaïv, and is coached and trained by Ruslan Savlokhov.

Ishchenko represented Ukraine at the 2008 Summer Olympics in Beijing, where he competed for the men's 120 kg class. He received a bye for the preliminary round of sixteen match, before losing out to Turkey's Aydın Polatçı, with a three-set technical score (3–0, 0–1, 0–1), and a classification point score of 1–3.
