= Scott Usher =

American former competition swimmer (born 1983)

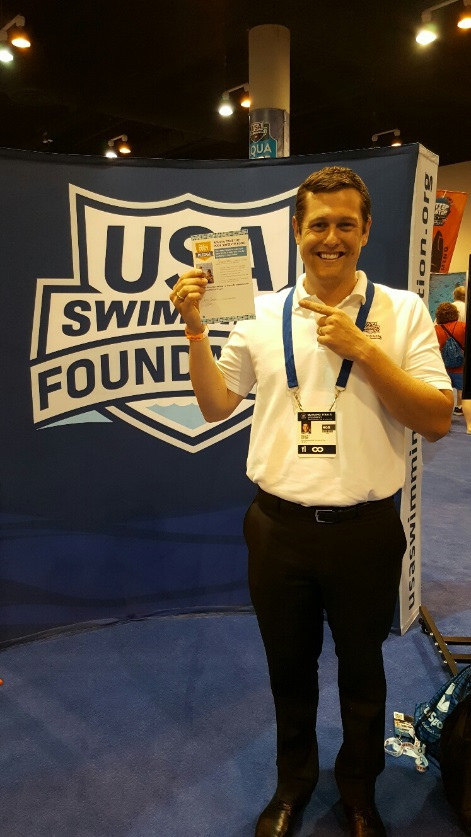

Personal information
- Full name: Scott Usher
- National team: United States
- Born: April 27, 1983 (age 43) Fullerton, Nebraska
- Height: 6 ft 2 in (1.88 m)
- Weight: 179 lb (81 kg)

Sport
- Sport: Swimming
- Strokes: Breaststroke
- Club: Boilermaker Aquatics
- College team: University of Wyoming
Medal record
Men's swimming
Representing the United States
Pan Pacific Championships
Bronze medal – third place	2006 Victoria	200 m breaststroke

Scott Usher (born April 27, 1983) is an American former competition swimmer who represented the United States at the 2004 Summer Olympics in Athens, Greece. He swam for Grand Island Senior High. He then swam for years at the University of Wyoming under the direction of head coach, Thomas Johnson.

Usher advanced to the finals of the men's 200-meter breaststroke, and finished seventh overall with a time of 2:11.95.

== See also ==
- List of University of Wyoming alumni
