= 2002 Wrestling World Cup – Men's freestyle =

Men's freestyle at the 2002 Wrestling World Cup
- Location: Spokane, United States
- Dates: 06–07 June

Medalists
gold medal	United States
silver medal	Russia
bronze medal	South Korea

The 2002 Wrestling World Cup – Men's freestyle was the first of a set of two Wrestling World Cups in 2002.

Legend

- F — Won by fall
- WO — Won by walkover

== Session 1 ==
Round 1

United States 21 - 3 Germany
Weight	United States	result	Germany
55 kg	Stephen Abas	5 – 0	Vasili Zeiher
60 kg	Eric Guerrero	7 – 0	Daniel Wilde
66 kg	Bill Zadick	7 – 3	Sergey Kovalenko
74 kg	Joe Williams	4 – 1	Alexander Leipold
84 kg	Lee Fullhart	F	Marc Buschle
97 kg	Chad Lamer	8 – 0	Yuri Shmatov
120 kg	Kerry McCoy	6 – 1	Sven Thiele

Round 2

Russia 18 - 9 Canada
Weight	Russia	result	Canada
55 kg	Ваzаrsada Dashinimaev	0 - 6	Mikheil Japaridze
60 kg	Ramil Islamov	7 - 8	Guivi Sissaouri
66 kg	Shamil Umalatov	9 – 1	Neal Ewers
74 kg	Irbek Farniev	8 – 3	Nathan Zoltan Hunyady
84 kg	Khadshimourad Gatsalov	10–0	Nicholas Ugoalah
97 kg	Georgi Gogshelidze	6 – 1	Dean Ryan Schmeichel
120 kg	Oleg Khorpiakov	F	Eric Ronald Kirschner

Round 3

South Korea 17 - 11 Mongolia
Weight	South Korea	result	Mongolia
55 kg	Jong-Dae Kim	9 – 1	Bayaraa Naranbaatar
60 kg	Hwan-Woong Hwang	2 – 3	Oyuunbilegiin Pürevbaatar
66 kg	Bae Jin-Kuk	4 – 0	Adiyahuu Boldsukh
74 kg	Kwon-Sub Choi	7 – 3	Batchuluun Battuya
84 kg	Eui-Jae Moon	11–1	Tumenulzu Munkhbayar
97 kg	Kang Dong-Guk	5 – 2	Tuvinshintur Enkhtuya
120 kg	Jung Chun-Mo	2–13	Gelegjamtsyn Ösökhbayar

Round 4

Canada 15 - 12 Germany
Weight	Canada	result	Germany
55 kg	Mikheil Japaridze	9 – 1	Jurgen Shlegel
60 kg	Guivi Sissaouri	10–0	Daniel Wilde
66 kg	Neal Ewers	3 – 5	Engin Urun
74 kg	Nathan Zoltan Hunyady	F	Alexander Leipold
84 kg	Nicholas Ugoalah	7 – 0	Marc Buschle
97 kg	Dean Ryan Schmeichel	4 – 2	Yuri Shmatov
120 kg	Eric Ronald Kirschner	1 - 8	Sven Thiele

== Session 2 ==
Round 1

United States 19 - 9 South Korea
Weight	United States	result	South Korea
55 kg	Stephen Abas	5 – 3	Jong-Dae Kim
60 kg	Eric Guerrero	16–5	Hwan-Woong Hwang
66 kg	Chris Bono	1 – 2	Bae Jin-Kuk
74 kg	Joe Williams	7 – 2	Kwon-Sub Choi
84 kg	Lee Fullhart	2 – 3	Moon Eui-Jae
97 kg	Chad Lamer	7 – 0	Kang Dong-Guk
120 kg	Kerry McCoy	10–0	Jung Chun-Mo

Round 2

Russia 23 - 3 Germany
Weight	Russia	result	Germany
55 kg	Nassir Abdullaev	4 – 3	Jurgen Shlegel
60 kg	Ramil Islamov	8 – 0	Daniel Wilde
66 kg	Shamil Umalatov	9 – 2	Ronny Sauter
74 kg	Irbek Farniev	3 - 2	Alexander Leipold
84 kg	Khadshimourad Gatsalov	WO	Marc Buschle
97 kg	Georgi Gogshelidze	4 – 0	Yuri Shmatov
120 kg	Oleg Khorpiakov	12 - 0	Sven Thiele

Round 3

United States 26 - 2 Mongolia
Weight	United States	result	Mongolia
55 kg	Stephen Abas	5 – 1	Bayaraa Naranbaatar
60 kg	Eric Guerrero	6 - 4	Oyuunbilegiin Pürevbaatar
66 kg	Bill Zadick	10–0	Adiyahuu Boldsukh
74 kg	Joe Williams	W	Batchuluun Battuya
84 kg	Lee Fullhart	F	Tumenulzu Munkhbayar
97 kg	Chad Lamer	F	Tuvinshintur Enkhtuya
120 kg	Kerry McCoy	WO	Gelegjamtsyn Ösökhbayar

Round 4

South Korea 14 - 12 Canada
Weight	South Korea	result	Canada
55 kg	Jong-Dae Kim	4 – 3	Mikheil Japaridze
60 kg	Hwan-Woong Hwang	F	Guivi Sissaouri
66 kg	Bae Jin-Kuk	4 – 0	Neal Ewers
74 kg	Kwon-Sub Choi	10–8	Nathan Zoltan Hunyady
84 kg	Eui-Jae Moon	6 – 0	Nicholas Ugoalah
97 kg	Kang Dong-Guk	2 - 4	Dean Ryan Schmeichel
120 kg	Jung Chun-Mo	1 – 9	Eric Ronald Kirschner

== Session 3 ==
Round 1

United States 22 - 6 Canada
Weight	United States	result	Canada
55 kg	Stephen Abas	4 – 2	Mikheil Japaridze
60 kg	Eric Guerrero	1 – 7	Guivi Sissaouri
66 kg	Chris Bono	7 – 1	Neal Ewers
74 kg	Joe Williams	10 - 0	Wade Elliott
84 kg	Lee Fullhart	8 - 2	Nicholas Ugoalah
97 kg	Chad Lamer	F	Dean Ryan Schmeichel
120 kg	Kerry McCoy	11 - 0	Eric Ronald Kirschner

Round 2

Russia 24 - 4 Mongolia
Weight	Russia	result	Mongolia
55 kg	Nassir Abdullaev	3 – 2	Bayaraa Naranbaatar
60 kg	Ramil Islamov	3 - 4	Oyuunbilegiin Pürevbaatar
66 kg	Shamil Umalatov	10–0	Adiyahuu Boldsukh
74 kg	Irbek Farniev	WO	Batchuluun Battuya
84 kg	Khadshimourad Gatsalov	11-0	Tumenulzu Munkhbayar
97 kg	Georgi Gogshelidze	10–0	Tuvinshintur Enkhtuya
120 kg	Oleg Khorpiakov	WO	Gelegjamtsyn Ösökhbayar

Round 3

Mongolia 17 - 9 Germany
Weight	Mongolia	result	Germany
55 kg	Bayaraa Naranbaatar	11–0	Jurgen Shlegel
60 kg	Oyuunbilegiin Pürevbaatar	3 – 0	Daniel Wilde
66 kg	Adiyahuu Boldsukh	6 - 3	Sergey Kovalenko
74 kg	Batchuluun Battuya	WO	Alexander Leipold
84 kg	Tumenulzu Munkhbayar	WO	Marc Buschle
97 kg	Tuvinshintur Enkhtuya	0 - 5	Yuri Shmatov
120 kg	Gelegjamtsyn Ösökhbayar	5 – 3	Sven Thiele

Round 4

Russia 20 - 9 South Korea
Weight	Russia	result	South Korea
55 kg	Ваzаrsada Dashinimaev	5 - 6	Jong-Dae Kim
60 kg	Ramil Islamov	4 - 1	Hwan-Woong Hwang
66 kg	Shamil Umalatov	2 - 4	Bae Jin-Kuk
74 kg	Irbek Farniev	13-1	Kwon-Sub Choi
84 kg	Khadshimourad Gatsalov	WO	Eui-Jae Moon
97 kg	Georgi Gogshelidze	9 – 1	Kang Dong-Guk
120 kg	Oleg Khorpiakov	F	Jung Chun-Mo

== Medal Matches ==
First-Place Match

United States 17 - 9 Russia
Weight	United States	result	Russia
55 kg	Stephen Abas	6 – 0	Nassir Abdullaev
60 kg	Eric Guerrero	4 – 0	Ramil Islamov
66 kg	Bill Zadick	W	Shamil Umalatov
74 kg	Joe Williams	5 – 0	Irbek Farniev
84 kg	Lee Fullhart	W	Khadshimourad Gatsalov
97 kg	Chad Lamer	W	Georgi Gogshelidze
120 kg	Kerry McCoy	W	Oleg Khorpiakov

Third-Place Match

South Korea 15 - 13 Germany
Weight	South Korea	result	Germany
55 kg	Jong-Dae Kim		Vasili Zeiher
60 kg	Hwan-Woong Hwang		Daniel Wilde
66 kg	Bae Jin-Kuk		Engin Urun
74 kg	Kwon-Sub Choi		Alexander Leipold
84 kg	Moon Eui-Jae		Marc Buschle
97 kg	Kang Dong-Guk		Yuri Shmatov
120 kg	Jung Chun-Mo		Sven Thiele

Fourth-Place Match

Mongolia 19 - 9 Canada
Weight	Mongolia	result	Canada
55 kg	Bayaraa Naranbaatar		Mikheil Japaridze
60 kg	Oyuunbilegiin Pürevbaatar	4 – 0	Guivi Sissaouri
66 kg	Adiyahuu Boldsukh		Neal Ewers
74 kg	Batchuluun Battuya		Nathan Zoltan Hunyady
84 kg	Tumenulzu Munkhbayar		Nicholas Ugoalah
97 kg	Tuvinshintur Enkhtuya		Dean Ryan Schmeichel
120 kg	Gelegjamtsyn Ösökhbayar		Eric Ronald Kirschner

== Team ranking ==
Rank	Men's freestyle
Rank	Team
1	United States
2	Russia
3	South Korea
4	Mongolia
5	Canada
6	Germany

== Medal summary ==
=== Men's freestyle ===
Event	Gold	Silver	Bronze
55 kg	Stephen Abas; United States	Jong-Dae Kim; South Korea	Bayaraa Naranbaatar; Mongolia
60 kg	Guivi Sissaouri; Canada	Eric Guerrero; United States	Oyuunbilegiin Pürevbaatar; Mongolia
66 kg	Bae Jin-Kuk; South Korea	Shamil Umalatov; Russia	Bill Zadick; United States
74 kg	Joe Williams; United States	Irbek Farniev; Russia	Alexander Leipold; Germany
84 kg	Khadshimourad Gatsalov; Russia	Eui-Jae Moon; South Korea	Lee Fullhart; United States
97 kg	Georgi Gogshelidze; Russia	Chad Lamer; United States	Dean Ryan Schmeichel; Canada
120 kg	Kerry McCoy; United States	Oleg Khorpiakov; Russia	Gelegjamtsyn Ösökhbayar; Mongolia
