= Francesco Miano-Petta =

Italian freestyle wrestler

Personal information
- Full name: Francesco Miano-Petta
- Nationality: Italy
- Born: 12 April 1979 (age 47) Naples, Italy
- Height: 1.82 m (5 ft 11 1/2 in)
- Weight: 120 kg (265 lb)

Sport
- Style: Freestyle
- Club: VVF Padula Napoli
- Coach: Luigi Marigliano
Medal record
Men's freestyle wrestling
Representing Italy
Mediterranean Games
| Bronze medal – third place | 2005 Almería | 120 kg |
| Bronze medal – third place | 2009 Pescara | 120 kg |

Francesco Miano-Petta (born April 12, 1979, in Naples) is a retired amateur Italian freestyle wrestler, who competed in the men's super heavyweight category. He won two bronze medals in the 120-kg division at the Mediterranean Games (2005 and 2009), and finished tenth at the 2004 Summer Olympics, representing his nation Italy. Having worked as a police officer for Polizia di Stato, Miano-Petta trained full-time for the wrestling squad at VVF Padula in Naples, under head coach Luigi Marigliano.

Miano-Petta qualified for the Italian squad in the men's 120 kg class at the 2004 Summer Olympics in Athens. Earlier in the process, Miano-Petta finished third from the Olympic Qualification Tournament in Sofia, Bulgaria to guarantee his spot on the Italian wrestling team. He lost two opening matches each to U.S. wrestler Kerry McCoy (0–7) and Kazakhstan's Marid Mutalimov (0–3) by an identical margin, but sailed smoothly with an easy victory over Kyrgyzstan's Yury Mildzihov, who forfeited to appear in their match due to injury. Finishing third in the prelim pool and tenth overall, Miano-Petta's performance was not enough to advance him to the quarterfinals.

Miano-Petta also sought his bid for the 2008 Summer Olympics in Beijing, but failed to earn a spot on a miniature Italian wrestling team from the Olympic Qualification Tournament. In 2009, he capped off his sporting career with a second career bronze medal in the 120-kg class at the Mediterranean Games in Pescara.
