= Efstathios Topalidis =

Greek sport wrestler

Personal information
- Full name: Efstathios Topalidis
- Nationality: Greece
- Born: 12 October 1978 (age 47) Athens, Greece
- Height: 1.85 m (6 ft 1 in)
- Weight: 120 kg (265 lb)

Sport
- Style: Freestyle
- Club: Atlas Kallitheas
- Coach: Hristos Alexandridis
Medal record
Men's freestyle wrestling
Representing Greece
European Championships
Bronze medal – third place	2005 Varna	120 kg

Efstathios Topalidis (Greek: Ευστάθιος Τοπαλίδης; born 12 October 1978) is a Greek former amateur freestyle wrestler, who competed in the men's super heavyweight category. He wrestled for the Greek squad at the 2000 Summer Olympics in Sydney, and eventually captured a bronze medal in the 120-kg category at the 2005 European Championships in Varna, Bulgaria. Topalidis trained throughout his sporting career as a member of the wrestling team for Atlas Kallitheas Club in Athens, under the tutelage of his longtime coach Hristos Alexandridis.

Topalidis qualified for the Greek wrestling squad in the men's super heavyweight class (130 kg) at the 2000 Summer Olympics in Sydney. Nearly six months earlier, he beat Poland's Tomasz Szewczyk in a consolation match to round off the podium for the bronze and a ticket to the Games at the third pre-Olympic tournament in Mexico City, Mexico. Topalidis lost two straight matches each to Iran's eventual fourth-place finalist Abbas Jadidi (1–9) and Georgia's Alex Modebadze (0–5), wrapping up his maiden Games to last place in the prelim pool and fifteenth overall in the final standings.
