= Gelegjamtsyn Ösökhbayar =

Mongolian freestyle wrestler

Personal information
- Nationality: Mongolia
- Born: Гэлэгжамцын Өсөхбаяр; 13 December 1973 (age 52) Battsengel sum, Arkhangai aimag, Mongolia
- Height: 1.97 m (6 ft 5 1/2 in)
- Weight: 130 kg (287 lb)

Sport
- Country: Mongolia
- Style: Freestyle
- Club: CSKA Ulaanbaatar
- Coach: Naidangiin Ganbaatar
Medal record
Men's freestyle wrestling
Representing Mongolia
World Cup
Bronze medal – third place	2002 Spokane	120 kg
Asian Games
Bronze medal – third place	1998 Bangkok	130 kg
Asian Championships
Gold medal – first place	2001 Ulaanbaatar	130 kg
East Asian Games
Silver medal – second place	2001 Osaka	130 kg

Gelegjamtsyn Ösökhbayar (Mongolian: Гэлэгжамцын Өсөхбаяр, IPA: [kiɮixt͡ɕamt͡sʰíɴ ɵs(ɵ)xpáɪr]; born December 13, 1973) is a retired amateur Mongolian freestyle wrestler, who competed in the men's super heavyweight category. Considered one of Mongolia's top wrestlers in his decade, Gelegjamts has claimed a bronze medal at the 1998 Asian Games in Bangkok, Thailand, picked up the 130-kg title at the 2001 Asian Wrestling Championships in Ulaanbaatar, and also represented his nation Mongolia at the 2004 Summer Olympics.

He earned 6-th place at the 1998 Grand Prix of Germany, where he beat 1993 World Cup Champion Oleg Ladik in the 130-kg division at 2–1. Gelegjamts highlighted his sporting career at the 1998 Asian Games in Bangkok, Thailand, where he grappled his way over Kazakhstan's Igor Klimov to fetch the bronze medal in the 130-kg division at 7–1. Though he missed a chance to compete the Olympics in 2000, Gelegjamts outclassed Iran's Alireza Rezaei in their final match to clinch his first ever gold in front of the home crowd at the 2001 Asian Wrestling Championships in Ulaanbaatar. Gelegjamts' sporting success continued to thrive at the World Championships and the 2002 Asian Games in Busan, South Korea, but finished outside of medals. At the 2002 World Cup he missed two rounds without grappling аnd received bronze medal after winning against Korean Jung Chun-Mo, Germany's World Cup Champion Sven Thiele and Canadian Eric Ronald Kirschner.

At the 2004 Summer Olympics in Athens, Gelegjamts qualified for his first Mongolian squad, as a 30-year-old, in the men's 120 kg class. Earlier in the process, he received a berth and rounded out the tenth spot in the super heavyweight category from the 2003 World Wrestling Championships in New York City, New York, United States. He opened the prelim pool with a comfortable 7–0 victory over Belarus' Barys Hrynkevich, but fell to his Iranian rival and eventual Olympic silver medalist Alireza Rezaei in their rematch 0–3 in overtime. Gelegjamts was haplessly pinned by Bulgaria's Bozhidar Boyadzhiev on his third match within three minutes, dropping him to third in the pool and placing twelfth in the final standings.

In March 2024, Gelegjamtsyn's son became a professional sumo wrestler (rikishi), now competing under the ring name, or shikona, Toshinofuji. Toshinofuji was promoted to the second-highest division of professional sumo (jūryō) in March 2026.

== Mongolian wrestling career record ==
Gelegjamtsyn Ösökhbayar
Year	Level	Participants	Rank	Wins	Earned title	Notes
2023	State	512	State Grand Champion	2		
2022	State	1024	State Grand Champion	2		
2021	Cancelled		State Grand Champion			Competition cancelled due to covid.
2020	State	512	State Grand Champion	2		
2019	State	512	State Grand Champion	3		
2018	State	512	State Grand Champion	4		
2017	State	512	State Grand Champion	4		
2016	State	1024	State Surge Champion	4		
2015	State	512	State Grand Champion	4		
2014	State	512	State Grand Champion	4	State Grand Champion	Promoted due to legal rule change.
2013	State	512	State Wide Champion	5	Usukh Ider	
2012	State	512	State Wide Champion	3		
2011	State	1024	State Wide Champion	7	Khuirnan Shuugigch	
2010	State	512	State Wide Champion	8	Nen Duursgalt	
2009	State	512	State Surge Champion	9	State Wide Champion	
2008	State	512	State Surge Champion	6	Unen Zorigt	
2007	State	512	State Surge Champion	4		
2006	State	1024	State Surge Champion	8	Tonj Garamgai	
2005	State	512	State Champion	9	State Surge Champion	
2004	State	512	State Champion	3		
2003	State	512	State Lion	9	State Champion	
2002	State	512	State Elephant	9	State Lion	
2001	State	1024	State Elephant	8	Buurshgui Khuchit	
2000	State	512	State Elephant	7	Khurdan Shalamgai	
1999	State	512	State Elephant	7	Saruul Saijrakh	
1998	State	512	State Elephant	4		
1997	State	512	State Elephant	5	Ulemj Badrakh	
1996	State	512	State Elephant	3		
1995	State	512	Lion of Aimag	7	State Elephant	
1994	Aimag	256	Elephant of Aimag	8	Lion of Aimag	
State Naadam Winner Won at least 5 rounds in State Naadam Aimag/Sum Naadam Promotion
