= Bakhtiyar Akhmedov =

Russian wrestler of Kumyk descent

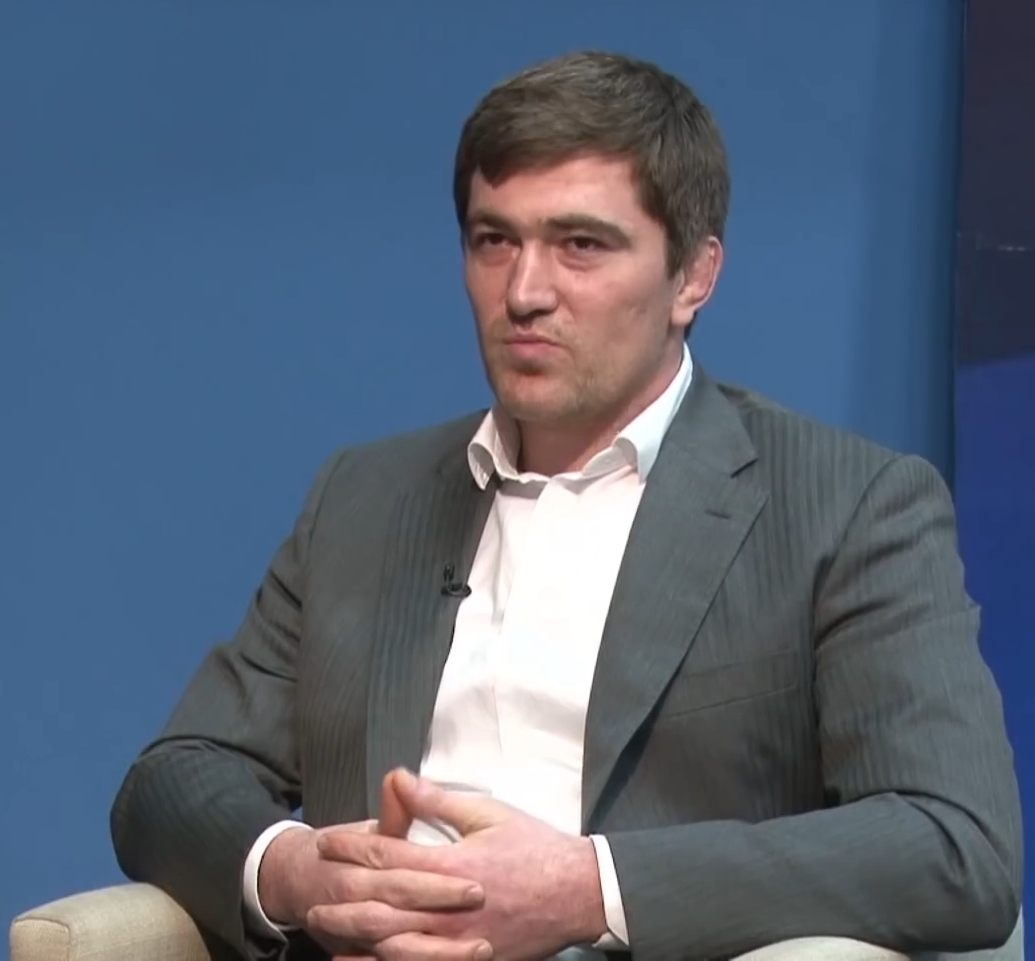
- Bakhtiyar Akhmedov 2018

Personal information
- Native name: Бахтияр Шахабутдинович Ахмедов
- Full name: Bakhtiyar Shakhabutdinovich Akhmedov
- Nationality: Russian
- Born: 5 August 1987 (age 38) Buynaksk, Dagestan, Russia
- Height: 190 cm (6 ft 3 in)

Sport
- Country: Russia
- Sport: Amateur wrestling
- Weight class: 120 kg
- Event: Freestyle
Medal record
Men's freestyle wrestling
Representing Russia
Olympic Games
Gold medal – first place	2008 Beijing	120 kg
European Championships
Bronze medal – third place	2008 Tampere	120 kg
World Juniors Championships
Gold medal – first place	2007 Beijing	120 kg
European Juniors Championships
Gold medal – first place	2007 Belgrade	120 kg
European Cadets Championships
Gold medal – first place	2004 Istanbul	100 kg
Gold medal – first place	2003 Skopje	100 kg
Representing Dagestan
Russian National Championships
Gold medal – first place	2011 Yakutsk	120 kg
Gold medal – first place	2008 St.Petersburg	120 kg
Silver medal – second place	2009 Kazan	120 kg
Silver medal – second place	2010 Volgograd	120 kg
Golden Grand Prix Ivan Yarygin
Gold medal – first place	2012 Krasnoyarsk	120 kg

Bakhtiyar Shakhabutdinovich Akhmedov (Russian: Бахтияр Шахабутдинович Ахмедов, Kumyk: Ахмедланы Багьтияр Шагьабутдинны уланы, romanized: Axmedlanı Bahtiyar Şahabutdinnı ulanı; born 5 August 1987 in Buynaksk, Dagestan) is a Russian wrestler of Kumyk descent. Olympic gold medalist 2008.

Akhmedov competed at the 2008 Summer Olympics in 120 kg category. In the finals, he lost to Artur Taymazov of Uzbekistan and was awarded silver medal. However, Taymazov was later stripped of his medal due to a positive doping test, thus Akhmedov was awarded gold.
