= Tommy Rowlands =

American wrestler (born 1981)

Personal information
- Born: June 3, 1981 (age 45) Columbus, Ohio, U.S.
- Height: 6 ft 4 in (193 cm)
- Weight: 229 lb (104 kg)

Sport
- Country: United States
- Sport: Wrestling
- Events: Freestyle and Folkstyle
- College team: Ohio State
- Team: USA
Medal record
Men's freestyle wrestling
Representing the United States
Pan American Games
Silver medal – second place	2007 Rio De Janeiro	120 kg
Men's collegiate wrestling
Representing the Ohio State Buckeyes
NCAA Division I Championships
Gold medal – first place	2002 Albany	285 lb
Gold medal – first place	2004 St. Louis	285 lb
Silver medal – second place	2001 Iowa City	285 lb

Tommy Rowlands (born June 3, 1981) is a former American freestyle and folkstyle wrestler.

== High school and college ==
Rowlands graduated from Bishop Ready High School in Columbus, Ohio in 1999. He was a two-time Ohio state champion (1997–99) and the 1999 National High School champion, with a career high school record of 167–10 with 98 pins. Tommy is the only wrestler in the history of Ohio wrestling to start out at 103 lbs his freshman year and finish at heavy weight his senior year.

He would wrestle collegiately for The Ohio State University from 2001 to 2004. During his career at Ohio State, he was a two-time NCAA Champion, three-time NCAA Finalist, four-time NCAA All-American and two-time Big Ten Champion. Rowlands is the career record holder at Ohio State for takedowns (705), wins (164) and team points (703). He was also the 2001 Big Ten freshman of the year.

== International ==
Following graduation from Ohio State in 2004, Rowlands had a successful international wrestling career. From 2004 to 2012, he was a University World Champion, Pan-Am Champion, 2x U.S. Open Champion, and 6x U.S. National Team Member. Rowlands was narrowly defeated in the finals of the Olympic Trials in 2008 & 2012 and became one of the few 2x Olympic Alternates in American wrestling history. He retired from competition following the 2012 Olympic Trials.
