= Barys Hrynkevich =

Belarusian freestyle wrestler

Personal information
- Full name: Barys Hrynkevich
- Nationality: Belarus
- Born: 26 April 1981 (age 45) Grodno, Belarusian SSR, Soviet Union
- Height: 1.96 m (6 ft 5 in)
- Weight: 112 kg (247 lb)

Sport
- Style: Freestyle
- Club: RTsFVS Hrodna
- Coach: Aleh Harbuz

Barys Hrynkevich (Belarusian: Барыс Грынкевіч; born April 26, 1981, in Grodno) is a retired amateur Belarusian freestyle wrestler, who competed in the men's super heavyweight category. He finished seventh in the 120-kg division at the 2003 World Wrestling Championships in New York City, New York, United States, and later represented his nation Belarus at the 2004 Summer Olympics. Hrynkevich also trained as a member of the freestyle wrestling team for RTsFVS Hrodna, under his personal coach Aleh Harbuz.

Hrynkevich qualified for the Belarusian squad in the men's super heavyweight class (120 kg) at the 2004 Summer Olympics in Athens, by placing seventh and receiving a berth from the World Championships a year earlier. Hrynkevich suffered three straight defeats from Mongolia's Gelegjamtsyn Ösökhbayar (0–6), Bulgaria's Bozhidar Boyadzhiev (1–5), and Iran's Alireza Rezaei (0–7), who later clinched a silver medal at the end of the tournament, with only a single point earned in the prelim pool, finishing seventeenth overall in the final standings.
