= Palwinder Singh Cheema =

Indian freestyle wrestler

Personal information
- Full name: Palwinder Singh Cheema
- Nationality: India
- Born: 11 November 1982 (age 44) Patiala, Punjab, India
- Height: 1.95 m (6 ft 5 in)
- Weight: 120 kg (265 lb)

Sport
- Style: Freestyle
- Club: NIS Patiala
- Coach: Sukhchain Cheema
Medal record
Men's freestyle wrestling
Representing India
Commonwealth Games
Gold medal – first place	2002 Manchester	120 kg
Asian Games
Bronze medal – third place	2002 Busan	120 kg
Bronze medal – third place	2006 Doha	120 kg
Asian Championships
Silver medal – second place	2003 Delhi	120 kg
Silver medal – second place	2004 Tehran	120 kg
Bronze medal – third place	2005 Wuhan	120 kg
Bronze medal – third place	2007 Bishkek	120 kg

Palwinder Singh Cheema (born 11 November 1982 in Patiala, Punjab) is a retired amateur Indian freestyle wrestler, who competed in the men's super heavyweight category. Considered one of India's top wrestlers in his decade, Cheema has claimed the gold medal at the 2002 Commonwealth Games in Manchester, England, scored two bronze in the 120-kg division at the Asian Games (2002 and 2006), and also represented his nation India at the 2004 Summer Olympics. Throughout his sporting career, Cheema trained full-time for NIS Patiala Wrestling Club under his coach and father Sukhchain Singh Cheema.

Cheema reached sporting headlines at the 2002 Commonwealth Games in Manchester, England, where he grappled his way over Canada's Eric Kirschner to fetch the gold medal in the 120-kg division on technical superiority. Following his immediate sporting success, Cheema went on to pick up a bronze at the Asian Games in Busan, South Korea, and silver at the Asian Championships in his native Delhi by the following year.

At the 2004 Summer Olympics in Athens, Cheema qualified for his first Indian squad, as a 21-year-old, in the men's 120 kg class. Earlier in the process, he placed second at the Olympic Qualification Tournament in Sofia, Bulgaria, and guaranteed a spot on the Indian wrestling team by winning his second silver from the Asian Championships in Tehran, Iran. He lost two straight matches each to eventual Olympic champion Artur Taymazov of Uzbekistan on technical superiority, and four-time Olympian Marek Garmulewicz of Poland (4–6), leaving him on the bottom of the prelim pool and placing fifteenth in the final standings.

At the 2006 Asian Games in Doha, Qatar, Cheema campaigned for his bronze medal defense over fancied Kazakh wrestler Marid Mutalimov in the 120-kg division. In 2007, Cheema bid his early retirement from wrestling at the age of 24, capping off his career with a remarkable tally of seven medals (one gold, four silver, and two bronze).Also holds RUSTAM-E-HIND title.
