= Serhii Priadun =

Ukrainian freestyle wrestler

Personal information
- Full name: Serhii Anatoliyovych Priadun
- Nationality: Ukraine
- Born: 11 October 1974 (age 51) Kharkiv Oblast, Ukrainian SSR, Soviet Union
- Height: 1.91 m (6 ft 3 in)
- Weight: 120 kg (265 lb)

Sport
- Style: Freestyle
- Club: Tavira Wrestling Club
- Coach: Vitali Karassov
Medal record
Men's freestyle wrestling
Representing Ukraine
European Championships
Silver medal – second place	2003 Riga	120 kg
Silver medal – second place	2007 Sofia	120 kg
Bronze medal – third place	2004 Ankara	120 kg
Military Games
Bronze medal – third place	1999 Zagreb	97 kg
Bronze medal – third place	2007 Hyderabad	120 kg

Serhii Anatoliyovych Priadun (Ukrainian: Сергій Анатолійович Прядун; born October 11, 1974, in Kharkiv Oblast, Ukrainian SSR) is a retired amateur Ukrainian freestyle wrestler, who competed in the men's super heavyweight category. He won three medals (two silver and one bronze) at the European Championships, scored a fourth-place finish in the 120-kg division at the 2003 World Wrestling Championships in New York City, New York, United States, and also represented his nation Ukraine at the 2004 Summer Olympics. Throughout his sporting career, Priadun trained full-time for Tavira Wrestling Club in Simferopol, under his personal coach Vitali Karassov.

Priadun qualified for the Ukrainian squad, as a 30-year-old, in the men's 120 kg class at the 2004 Summer Olympics in Athens. Earlier in the process, he placed fourth and guaranteed a spot on Ukraine's wrestling team from the World Championships, losing to Iran's Alireza Rezaei for the bronze medal. Priadun lost two straight matches each to 2000 Olympic bronze medalist Alexis Rodríguez of Cuba (0–8) and Nestoras Batzelas of Greece (0–5) without obtaining a single point, leaving him on the bottom of the prelim pool and placing last out of 20 wrestlers in the final standings.
