= Anton Kramarenko =

Kyrgyzstani swimmer

Personal information
- Full name: Anton Kramarenko
- National team: Kyrgyzstan
- Born: 27 January 1984 (age 42) Frunze, Kyrgyz SSR, Soviet Union
- Height: 1.79 m (5 ft 10 1/2 in)
- Weight: 60 kg (132 lb)

Sport
- Sport: Swimming
- Strokes: Breaststroke

Anton Kramarenko (Russian: Антон Крамаренко; born January 27, 1984) is a Kyrgyz former swimmer, who specialized in breaststroke events. Kramarenko qualified for the men's 200 m breaststroke at the 2004 Summer Olympics in Athens, by clearing a FINA B-cut of 2:20.57 from the Kazakhstan Open Championships in Almaty. He challenged six other swimmers in heat one, including two-time Olympian Malick Fall of Senegal. He rounded out the field to last place in 2:28.59, nearly 10 seconds behind winner Bradley Ally of Barbados. Kramarenko failed to advance into the semifinals, as he placed forty-sixth overall in the preliminaries.
