= Igor Klimov (wrestler) =

Kazakhstani wrestler (born 1962)

Igor Klimov (born 1 June 1962) is a Soviet and Kazakhstani former wrestler who competed in the 1996 Summer Olympics.

== Highlight achievements ==
- Two-time Asian Championships medalist.
- 1994 Asian Games silver medalist.
- 1991 Golden Grand Prix Ivan Yarygin′s champion.
- 1991 USSR Peoples' Spartakiad champion, an achievement equivalent in status to the USSR champion title.
