= Tolly Thompson =

American wrestler (born 1973)

Personal information
- Born: January 1, 1973 (age 53) Janesville, Iowa, U.S.

Sport
- Country: United States
- Sport: Wrestling
- Events: Freestyle and Folkstyle
- College team: Nebraska
- Team: USA
Medal record
Men's freestyle wrestling
Representing the United States
World Championships
| Bronze medal – third place | 2005 Budapest | 120 kg |
Pan American Championships
| Gold medal – first place | 1998 Winnipeg | 130 kg |
| Gold medal – first place | 2002 Maracaibo | 120 kg |
Collegiate Wrestling
Representing the Nebraska Cornhuskers
NCAA Division I Championships
| Gold medal – first place | 1995 Iowa City | 275 lb |
| Bronze medal – third place | 1996 Minneapolis | 275 lb |
| Bronze medal – third place | 1997 Cedar Falls | 275 lb |

Tolly Thompson (born January 1, 1973) is an American former freestyle and folkstyle wrestler. He represented the United States in freestyle wrestling at the 2005 and 2006 World Championships at 120 kg. In 2005, he earned a bronze medal at the World Championships.

== Early life ==
Thompson attended Janesville High School in Janesville, Iowa. As a high school wrestler, Thompson had a record of 118-6 and was a two-time Iowa state finalist. He was also a two-time national finalist, reaching the national finals twice at the USA Junior nationals.

== College ==
In college, Thompson was a three-time All-American and NCAA champion for the University of Nebraska–Lincoln.

== Senior level ==
Thompson was the United States representative at 120 kg at the freestyle wrestling World Championships in 2005 and 2006. In 2005, he earned the bronze medal at the World Championships at 120 kg. Other freestyle wrestling accomplishments include winning the Pan American Championships twice.

== Other honors ==
In 2010, Thompson was inducted into the National Wrestling Hall of Fame as a Glen Brand Inductee. In 2013, Thompson was inducted into the Iowa Wrestling Hall of Fame.
