= Ottó Aubéli =

Hungarian freestyle wrestler (born 1975)

Personal information
- Full name: Ottó Zsolt Aubéli
- Nationality: Hungary
- Born: 31 March 1975 (age 51) Esztergom, Hungary
- Height: 1.86 m (6 ft 1 in)
- Weight: 110 kg (243 lb)

Sport
- Style: Freestyle
- Club: Csepeli BC Budapest
- Coach: Csaba Ubránkovics
Medal record
Men's freestyle wrestling
Representing Hungary
World Championships
| Bronze medal – third place | 2005 Budapest | 120 kg |
European Championships
| Bronze medal – third place | 2005 Varna | 120 kg |

Ottó Zsolt Aubéli (born March 31, 1975, in Esztergom) is an amateur Hungarian freestyle wrestler, who played for the men's super heavyweight category. In 2005, he won two bronze medals at the World Championships in Budapest, Hungary, and at the European Championships in Varna, Bulgaria.

Aubeli made his official debut at the 2004 Summer Olympics in Athens, where he placed third in the preliminary pool of the men's 120 kg class, against Georgia's Alex Modebadze, and Russia's Kuramagomed Kuramagomedov.

At the 2008 Summer Olympics in Beijing, Aubeli reached the quarterfinal round of the 120 kg class by easily defeating Palau's Florian Skilang Temengil. He lost to former Olympic champion and Russian-born wrestler David Musuľbes of Slovakia, who was able to score four points in two straight periods, leaving Aubeli with a single point.

His daughter, Tekla, is a water polo player who plays for the Hungary women's national water polo team.
