= Kerry McCoy (wrestler) =

American wrestler (born 1974)

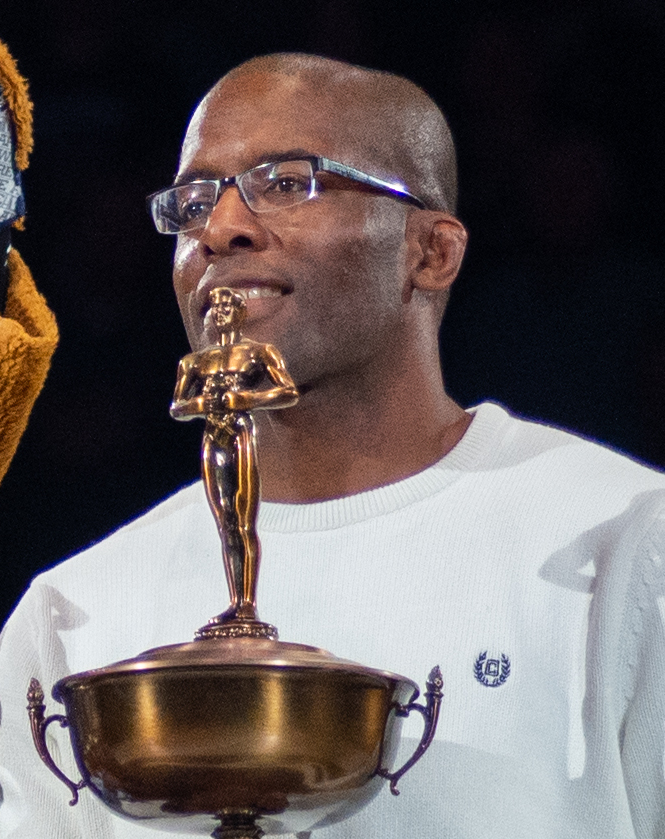
- McCoy in 2020

Personal information
- Born: August 2, 1974 (age 51) Riverhead, New York, U.S.
- Height: 6 ft 2 in (188 cm)
- Weight: 250 lb (113 kg)
Medal record
Men's freestyle wrestling
Representing the United States
World Championships
Silver medal – second place	2003 New York	120 kg
Pan American Games
Gold medal – first place	2003 Santa Domingo	120 kg
Pan American Championships
Gold medal – first place	1993 Guatemala City	100 kg
Gold medal – first place	2000 Cali	130 kg
Goodwill Games
Silver medal – second place	1998 New York	130 kg
Junior World Championships
Gold medal – first place	1992 Cali	88 kg
Cadet World Championships
Silver medal – second place	1990 Szombathely	83 kg
Collegiate Wrestling
Representing the Penn State Nittany Lions
NCAA Division I Championships
Gold medal – first place	1994 Chapel Hill	275 lb
Gold medal – first place	1997 Cedar Falls	275 lb
Bronze medal – third place	1995 Iowa City	275 lb

Kerry R. McCoy (born August 2, 1974) is an American wrestler and executive director and head coach of the Lehigh Valley Wrestling Club regional training center. He competed at the Olympic Games twice and four times at the World Cup Championships. In college, he was a three-time NCAA All-American and a two-time NCAA National Champion. He was the head coach of the University of Maryland's wrestling program for eleven years, stepping down in 2019. In 2014, McCoy was inducted into the National Wrestling Hall of Fame as a Distinguished Member.

== Wrestling career ==
=== High School and Collegiate ===
McCoy had a successful career as an athlete, beginning at Longwood High School in Middle Island, New York. McCoy was named the 2005 Friends of Long Island Wrestling Man of the Year and was inducted into the Longwood High School Hall of Fame in 1998.

McCoy went on to compete at Penn State, where he accumulated an overall record of 150–18 and won the NCAA heavyweight championships in 1994 and 1997. McCoy also won three Big Ten titles and won 131 of his last 132 matches at Penn State, including an 88-match winning streak. A three-time All-American (defined as finishing in the top eight at the national championship), McCoy was named the Penn State Athlete of the Year and the Nittany Lions' Wrestler of the Year in 1994 and 1997. During his senior year, he was selected as the 1997 Dan Hodge winner and was chosen as WIN magazine's Wrestler of the Year. In 1997, McCoy graduated with a bachelor's degree in marketing from Penn State.

=== Olympic and International ===
A two-time Olympian, McCoy took fifth place at the 2000 Olympic Games and seventh at the 2004 Games. In 2000, McCoy qualified for the Olympics at 286 pounds (130 kg) by defeating 1999 World Champion Stephen Neal, by scores of 4–1 and 6–4. In 2004, McCoy won his fifth consecutive U.S. National Freestyle Wrestling Championship, taking five straight matches and defeating 2003 NCAA champion Steve Mocco 3–0 in the final. His victory put him in the finals of the Olympic trials, where he beat Tolly Thompson 5–3 and 8–0 to earn the right to represent the United States again at the 2004 Summer Games.

McCoy was a consistent force nationally for a decade, achieving numerous top finishes at the United States National Tournament with a fourth-place finish in 1994; third in 1995; second in 1996 and 1997; fifth in 1998; third in 1999; and first from 2000 to 2004. He is a nine-time member of the National Team. In 1998 and 2001, he placed fourth at the World Championships, and he won a silver medal in 2003. In August 2003, McCoy won a gold medal at the Pan-American Games and was honored as the Outstanding Wrestler of the tournament.

== Coaching career ==
Before his arrival at Lehigh, McCoy served as an assistant at Penn State for three seasons, during which the Nittany Lions posted two fourth-place finishes at the NCAA Tournament and produced 10 All-Americans and two NCAA Champions.

McCoy then became an assistant coach with the Lehigh wrestling program in Bethlehem, Pennsylvania; in his five seasons there, he coached 14 NCAA All-Americans, including two NCAA Champions, and the program won the EIWA Conference championship four times. McCoy also helped guide Jon Trenge, who weighed 197 pounds (89 kg) to a Lehigh-record 133 victories in his career and three top-three finishes at the NCAA Championships. During his time at Lehigh, McCoy also worked for the Lehigh Valley Athletic Club as a director. In addition, McCoy has served on Athlete Advisory committees for USA Wrestling and the United States Olympic Committee, and has spent multiple seasons on the U.S. Freestyle World Team coaching staff.

As head coach of Stanford from 2005 to 2008, McCoy made a strong start with the program, leading the team to a winning record in his first season as a head coach. Under McCoy's guidance, the team finished 2005–06 with an 8–7 record in dual meets and improved by two spots at the Pac-10 Championships. In addition, he helped two wrestlers qualify for the NCAA championships and coached Tanner Gardner, a sophomore, to become the 13th All-American in the history of Stanford.

During McCoy's second year at the helm of the program, the improvement continued. The Cardinal finished with an 8–8 dual meet record, and climbed another rung higher, to sixth place, on the Pac-10 ladder. With the help of McCoy, five wrestlers placed in the Pac-10 and Gardner captured the program's first individual Pac-10 title since 2004. All five qualified for the NCAA Championships, one of the highest totals of NCAA qualifiers in Cardinal history. Gardner and Josh Zupancic earned All-America honors, the first Stanford pair to do so in the same season since 1967, while freshman Zack Giesen was named the Pac-10 Newcomer of the Year.

In his inaugural season as the head coach of the Terrapins, McCoy led the team to a school-record-tying 10th place NCAA Tournament finish, earning three All-Americans with Steve Bell (133, 6th), Alex Krom (141, 5th) and Hudson Taylor (197, 3rd). McCoy also led the team to an ACC Tournament championship, crowning ACC Champions Brenden Byrne (125), Steve Bell (133), and Alex Krom (141). In the 2009–10 season, McCoy led the team to a school-record 19 duel meet victories, school-record-breaking career wins and career and season pins for Hudson Taylor, who weighed 197 pounds (89 kg), McCoy's first regular season conference championship, a runner-up finish at ACC conference championship and a 20th-place finish at the NCAA Championship. Athletes whom McCoy has subsequently coached to All-American status include three-time All American Josh Asper (165), Spencer Myers (285), University World Bronze Medalist Mike Letts (174), and NCAA runner-up Jimmy "Headlock" Sheptock (174). During the 2014 season, McCoy had the opportunity to coach against the three-time NCAA champion, and fellow Penn State alumnus Ed Ruth in the national championship held in Oklahoma City.

McCoy and his wife, Abbie, were married in June in State College, Pennsylvania. The couple resides in College Park, Maryland.

McCoy was hired as the executive director and head coach at the California Olympic Regional Training Center on June 8, 2020. In 2021, he become the executive director and head coach at the Lehigh Valley Wrestling Club Regional Training Center.

== See also ==
- List of Pennsylvania State University Olympians
