= Alex Modebadze =

Georgian freestyle wrestler

Personal information
- Full name: Aleksi Modebadze
- Nationality: Georgia
- Born: 21 February 1978 (age 48) Tbilisi, Georgian SSR, Soviet Union
- Height: 1.91 m (6 ft 3 in)
- Weight: 115 kg (254 lb)

Sport
- Style: Freestyle
- Club: Shevardeni Tbilisi
- Coach: Zaza Turmanidze
Medal record
Men's freestyle wrestling
Representing Georgia
European Championships
Silver medal – second place	2001 Budapest	130 kg
Bronze medal – third place	2003 Riga	130 kg
Bronze medal – third place	2007 Sofia	120 kg

Aleksi "Alex" Modebadze (Georgian: ალექსი მოდებაძე; born February 21, 1978) is a retired amateur Georgian freestyle wrestler who competed in the men's super heavyweight category. He represented his nation Georgia in two editions of the Olympic Games (2000 and 2004), and later claimed three career medals at the European Championships. Modebadze also trained for Shevardeni Wrestling Club in Tbilisi under his personal coach Zaza Turmanidze.

Modebadze made his official debut at the 2000 Summer Olympics in Sydney, where he competed in the men's super heavyweight division (130 kg). He eclipsed Greece's Efstathios Topalidis on his opening bout with a striking effort, but could not pin Iranian wrestler and 1999 world champion Abbas Jadidi into the ring without collecting a single point. Finishing second in the prelim pool and tenth in the overall rankings, Modebadze fell short to earn a spot for the quarterfinals.

At the 2004 Summer Olympics in Athens, Modebadze qualified for his second Georgian squad in the men's 120 kg class by receiving a berth and achieving a top eight finish from the 2003 World Wrestling Championships in New York City, New York, United States. Modebadze managed to score a single triumph over Hungary's Ottó Aubéli with a five-point advantage, but he was thrown powerfully by Russian wrestler and 1997 world champion Kuramagomed Kuramagomedov in overtime to end his Olympic campaign with a second-place effort in the prelim pool and fourteenth in the overall rankings.
