= Bozhidar Boyadzhiev =

Bulgarian freestyle wrestler

Personal information
- Full name: Bozhidar Khristomirov; Boyadzhiev
- Nationality: Bulgaria
- Born: 30 April 1978 (age 48) Kazanlak, Stara Zagora, Bulgaria
- Height: 1.83 m (6 ft 0 in)
- Weight: 120 kg (265 lb)

Sport
- Sport: Wrestling
- Event: Freestyle
- Club: Levski Sofia
- Coached by: Petar Kasabov

Bozhidar Khristomirov Boyadzhiev (Bulgarian: Божидар Христомиров Бояджиев; born April 30, 1978, in Kazanlak, Stara Zagora) is an amateur Bulgarian freestyle wrestler, who played for the men's super heavyweight category. Boyadzhiev achieved three top-five finishes for his division at the European Championships (2002 in Baku, Azerbaijan, 2005 in Varna, Bulgaria, and 2006 in Moscow, Russia). He is also a two-time Olympian, and a member of Levski Sofia Wrestling Club in Sofia, under his personal coach Peter Kasabov.

Boyadzhiev made his official debut for the 2004 Summer Olympics in Athens, where he placed second in the preliminary pool of the men's 120 kg class, against Iran's Alireza Rezaei, Mongolia's Gelegjamtsyn Ösökhbayar, and Belarus' Barys Hrynkevich.

At the 2008 Summer Olympics in Beijing, Boyadzhiev competed for the second time in the men's 120 kg class. He lost the qualifying round to Russia's Bakhtiyar Akhmedov, who was able to score two points each in two straight periods, leaving Boyadzhiev without a single point. Because his opponent advanced further into the final match, Boyadzhiev offered another shot for the bronze medal by entering the repechage bouts. He was defeated in the first round by Iran's Fardin Masoumi, with a technical score of 3–6.
