= Liang Lei =

Chinese freestyle wrestler

Medal record

Men's freestyle wrestling

Representing China

Asian Championships
Bronze medal – third place	2008 Jeju City	120 kg

Liang Lei (Chinese: 梁磊, born April 3, 1982) is a male Chinese freestyle wrestler who competed at the 2008 Summer Olympics. He lost in the second round to Steve Mocco.

Liang was born in Shanxi. His personal best was coming 2nd at the 2006 Asian Championships.

== See also ==
- China at the 2012 Summer Olympics
