= David Musulbes =

Slovak freestyle wrestler

Personal information
- Full name: David Vladimirovich Musulbes
- Born: 28 May 1972 (age 54) Ordzhonikidze, North Ossetian ASSR, Soviet Union
Medal record
Men's freestyle wrestling
Olympic Games
Representing Russia
Gold medal – first place	2000 Sydney	130 kg
Representing Slovakia
Silver medal – second place	2008 Beijing	120 kg
World Championships
Representing Russia
Gold medal – first place	2001 Sofia	130 kg
Gold medal – first place	2002 Tehran	120 kg
Bronze medal – third place	1994 Istanbul	100 kg
Bronze medal – third place	1997 Krasnoyarsk	130 kg

David Vladimirovich Musulbes (Russian: Давид Владимирович Мусульбес, also transliterated Musuľbes, born 28 May 1972 in Ordzhonikidze, North Ossetian ASSR) is a retired Russian wrestler of Georgian origin who competed for Russia and later represented Slovakia.

He is the 2000 Summer Olympics winner in freestyle 130 kg, the 2001 and 2002 World Champion in freestyle 120 kg.

In 2007, he gained Slovak citizenship and represented Slovakia at the 2008 Summer Olympics, winning the bronze medal in freestyle 120 kg. After Artur Taymazov, who defeated Musulbes in semifinals, was positively tested for banned substance in his urine sample and disqualified, Musulbes moved to second place and silver medal.

Musulbes lives in Moscow, where he is the director of the Moscow Secondary Special Olympic Reserve School No. 1.
