= Alireza Rezaei =

Iranian wrestler (born 1976)

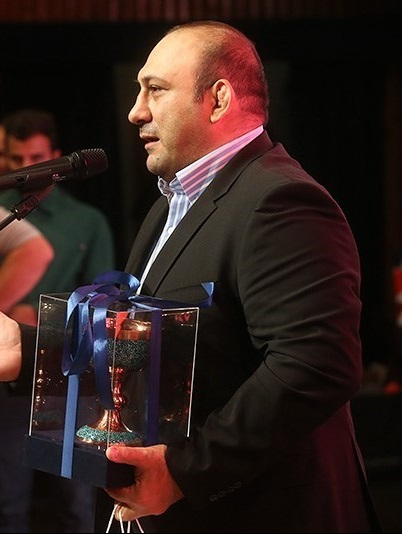
- Alireza Rezaei, 2016

Personal information
- Full name: Alireza Rezaei
- Nationality: Iranian
- Born: July 11, 1976 (age 50) Tehran, Iran

Sport
- Sport: Wrestling
- Event: Freestyle
- Now coaching: Mansour Barzegar
Medal record
Men's freestyle wrestling
Representing Iran
Olympic Games
Silver medal – second place	2004 Athens	120 kg
World Championships
Bronze medal – third place	2003 New York	120 kg
Asian Games
Gold medal – first place	1998 Bangkok	130 kg
Asian Championships
Gold medal – first place	1999 Tashkent	130 kg
Gold medal – first place	2003 New Delhi	120 kg
Silver medal – second place	2001 Ulan Bator	130 kg
Silver medal – second place	2005 Wuhan	120 kg
Bronze medal – third place	2000 Guilin	130 kg

Alireza Rezaei (Persian: علیرضا رضایی; born July 11, 1976) is a former Iranian wrestler Iran's first heavyweight medalist in the 2004 Olympics who competed in the Men's Freestyle 120 kg at the 2004 Summer Olympics and won the silver medal. He is currently executive director of Iranian national team.
