= Alexis Rodríguez (wrestler) =

Cuban freestyle wrestler

Personal information
- Born: 7 July 1978 (age 48) Havana, Cuba

Sport
- Sport: Freestyle wrestling
Medal record
Men's freestyle wrestling
Representing Cuba
Olympic Games
Bronze medal – third place	2000 Sydney	130 kg
World Championships
Gold medal – first place	1998 Tehran	130 kg
Bronze medal – third place	2001 Sofia	130 kg
Pan American Games
Gold medal – first place	2007 Rio de Janeiro	120kg
Silver medal – second place	1999 Winnipeg	130kg
Bronze medal – third place	2003 Santo Domingo	120kg
Central American and Caribbean Games
Gold medal – first place	1998 Maracaibo	130kg

Alexis Rodríguez Valera (born 7 July 1978) is a Cuban wrestler. He was Olympic bronze medalist in Freestyle wrestling in 2000. He is the world champion in 1998. He also competed at the 2004 Olympics, where he placed fifth.
