= Kuramagomed Kuramagomedov =

Russian freestyle wrestler

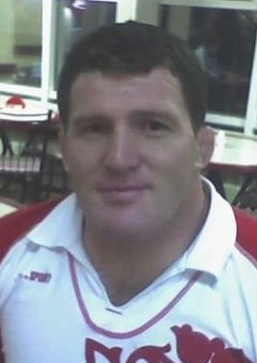

Personal information
- Born: 21 March 1978 (age 48) Makhachkala, Dagestan, Russia
Medal record
Men's freestyle wrestling
World Championships
Representing Russia
Gold medal – first place	1997 Krasnoyarsk	97 kg
Bronze medal – third place	1998 Tehran	97 kg
Silver medal – second place	2006 Guangzhou	120 kg

Kuramagomed Sharipovich Kuramagomedov (Russian: Курамагомед Шарипович Курамагомедов; born 21 March 1978) is a freestyle wrestler who competed for Russia in the 2004 Summer Olympics. He won a world title in 1997 at 97 kg. He also represented Russia at the World Championships in 1998, where he won bronze at 97 kg. From 2003 to 2005, he competed for Russia at 120 kg. He won a silver medal at the 2005 World Championships.
