= Marid Mutalimov =

Kazakhstani wrestler (born 1980)

Medal record

Men's freestyle wrestling

Representing Kazakhstan

Olympic Games
Bronze medal – third place	2008 Beijing	120 kg

Asian Championships
Silver medal – second place	2008 Jeju City	120 kg

Marid Mutalimov (Kumyk: Марид Муталимов, romanized: Marid Mutalimov; born 22 February 1980 in Makhachkala, Dagestan) is a Kazakhstan wrestler of Kumyk ethnicity, who has won a bronze medal at the 2008 Summer Olympics.
