= Artur Taymazov =

Uzbek-Russian wrestler and politician

Artur Borisovich Taymazov
- Таймазты Артур
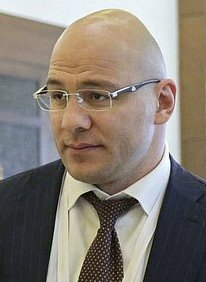

Member of the State Duma for North Ossetia-Alania
- Incumbent
- Assumed office 5 October 2016
- Preceded by: constituency re-established
- Constituency: North Ossetia (No. 25)

Personal details
- Born: 22 July 1979 (age 47) Nogir, North Ossetian ASSR, RSFSR, USSR
- Sports career
- Height: 1.90 m (6 ft 3 in)
- Weight: 120 kg (265 lb)
- Country: Uzbekistan and Russia
- Sport: Wrestling
- Event: Freestyle
- Club: Dynamo Tashkent
- Coached by: Salim Abduvaliev; Akhrol Ruziev

Sports achievements and titles
- Olympic finals: 2000, 2004, 2008, 2012
Medal record
Men's Freestyle Wrestling
Representing Russia
Gold medal – first place	1998 World Youth Games
Representing Uzbekistan
Olympic Games
Silver medal – second place	2000 Sydney	130 kg
Gold medal – first place	2004 Athens	120 kg
Disqualified	2008 Beijing	120 kg
Disqualified	2012 London	120 kg
World Championships
Silver medal – second place	2001 Sofia	130 kg
Gold medal – first place	2003 New York City	120 kg
Gold medal – first place	2006 Guangzhou	120 kg
Bronze medal – third place	2007 Baku	120 kg
Silver medal – second place	2010 Moscow	120 kg
Asian Games
Gold medal – first place	2002 Busan	120 kg
Gold medal – first place	2006 Doha	120 kg
Gold medal – first place	2010 Guangzhou	120 kg
Asian Championships
Gold medal – first place	2000 Guilin	130 kg
Gold medal – first place	2011 Tashkent	120 kg

Artur Borisovich Taymazov (Iron Ossetic: Таймазты Барисы фырт Артур; Russian: Артур Борисович Таймазов; born 20 July 1979) is an Uzbek-Russian wrestler and politician and an ethnic Ossetian. He was Uzbekistan's most decorated Olympian before being stripped of two gold medals for doping. In 2016, he was elected to the 7th State Duma of the Russian Federation representing United Russia.

On 5 April 2017, it was announced that as a result of retesting samples he had been disqualified from the 2008 Olympics for a drug violation, and his gold medal was withdrawn. On 23 July 2019, it was announced that as a result of retesting samples he had been disqualified from the 2012 Olympics for a drug violation, and his gold medal from that event was also withdrawn. As both of his gold medals were re-allocated to Russian wrestlers, Taymazov said he was nonetheless happy to "bring" two golds to Russia.

== Early life ==
In childhood, he was doing weightlifting but when he turned 11, a freestyle wrestling club opened in his village and he decided to wrestle. His older brother Tymur Taymazov was a 1996 Olympic Games champion in weightlifting, competing for Ukraine.

== Olympics ==
=== 2000 Sydney Olympics ===
Making his Olympic debut in Sydney in 2000, he won Uzbekistan's first Olympic wrestling medal in the 130 kg weight class, losing to Russian David Musul'bes in the final.

=== 2004 Athens Olympics ===
In the 2004 Games in Athens he became Uzbekistan's first multiple-medalist after winning gold in the 120 kg weight class.

=== 2008 Beijing Olympics ===
He successfully defended his 120 kg title in Beijing four years later, this time defeating Musul'bes in the semifinals, winning 3–0, 1–0 in the final against Russian Bakhtiyar Akhmedov. After his second olympic title in Beijing, he was honored in his country by the Buyuk Hizmatlari Uchun Order ("For Outstanding Services").

His urine sample was retested in 2016, and he was found to be taking a banned substance. Taymazov was stripped of his medal, and his 2008 results were disqualified.

=== 2012 London Olympics ===
At the 2012 Games in London, he won his third consecutive gold medal by beating Davit Modzmanashvili of Georgia in the final 2–0.

On the athlete's page which introduced Taymazov, his height was wrongly shown as 1.75 m, but his actual height was 1.90 m.

On 23 July 2019, it was announced that as a result of retesting samples, Taymazov had been disqualified from the 2012 Olympics for a drug violation, and his gold medal from that event was withdrawn.

== Results ==
#	Event	Rank
1	1998 World Youth Games	(gold) (Russia)
2	Wrestling at the 2000 Summer Olympics – Qualification	1st place, gold medalist(s)
3	2000 Asian Championship	1st place, gold medalist(s)
4	2000 Olympic	2nd place, silver medalist(s)
5	2001 World Championship	2nd place, silver medalist(s)
6	2002 World Championship	8th
7	2002 Asian Games	1st place, gold medalist(s)
8	2003 World Championship	1st place, gold medalist(s)
9	2004 Olympic	1st place, gold medalist(s)
10	2005 World Championship	10th
11	2006 World Championship	1st place, gold medalist(s)
12	2006 Asian Games	1st place, gold medalist(s)
13	2007 World Championship	3rd place, bronze medalist(s)
14	2008 Olympic	DSQ
15	2010 World Championship	2nd place, silver medalist(s)
16	2010 Asian Games	1st place, gold medalist(s)
17	2011 Asian Championship	1st place, gold medalist(s)
18	2011 World Championship	8th
19	Wrestling at the 2012 Summer Olympics – Qualification	1st place, gold medalist(s)
20	2012 Olympic	DSQ

== Politics ==
He has been a member of the State Duma since 2016, representing the North Ossetia constituency.

=== Sanctions ===
He was sanctioned by Canada under the Special Economic Measures Act (S.C. 1992, c. 17) in relation to the Russian invasion of Ukraine for Grave Breach of International Peace and Security, and by the UK government in 2022 in relation to the Russo-Ukrainian War.

== Personal life ==
Artur's son, Arsen Taimazov, is a professional ice hockey defenceman who is currently playing for HC Lada Togliatti in the Kontinental Hockey League.
