= IWGP Heavyweight Championship (disambiguation) =

The IWGP Heavyweight Championship, a top championship in New Japan Pro-Wrestling from 1987–2021 and 2026–present

IWGP Heavyweight Championship may also refer to:

- IWGP Heavyweight Championship (original version), New Japan Pro-Wrestling's top championship from 1983–1987
- IWGP Heavyweight Championship (IGF), Inoki Genome Federation's top championship from 2007–2008
- IWGP Tag Team Championship, also known as the IWGP Heavyweight Tag Team Championship, is a tag team championship sanctioned by New Japan Pro-Wrestling
- IWGP World Heavyweight Championship, New Japan Pro-Wrestling's top championship from 2021–2026
