= Hulk Hogan's championships and accomplishments =

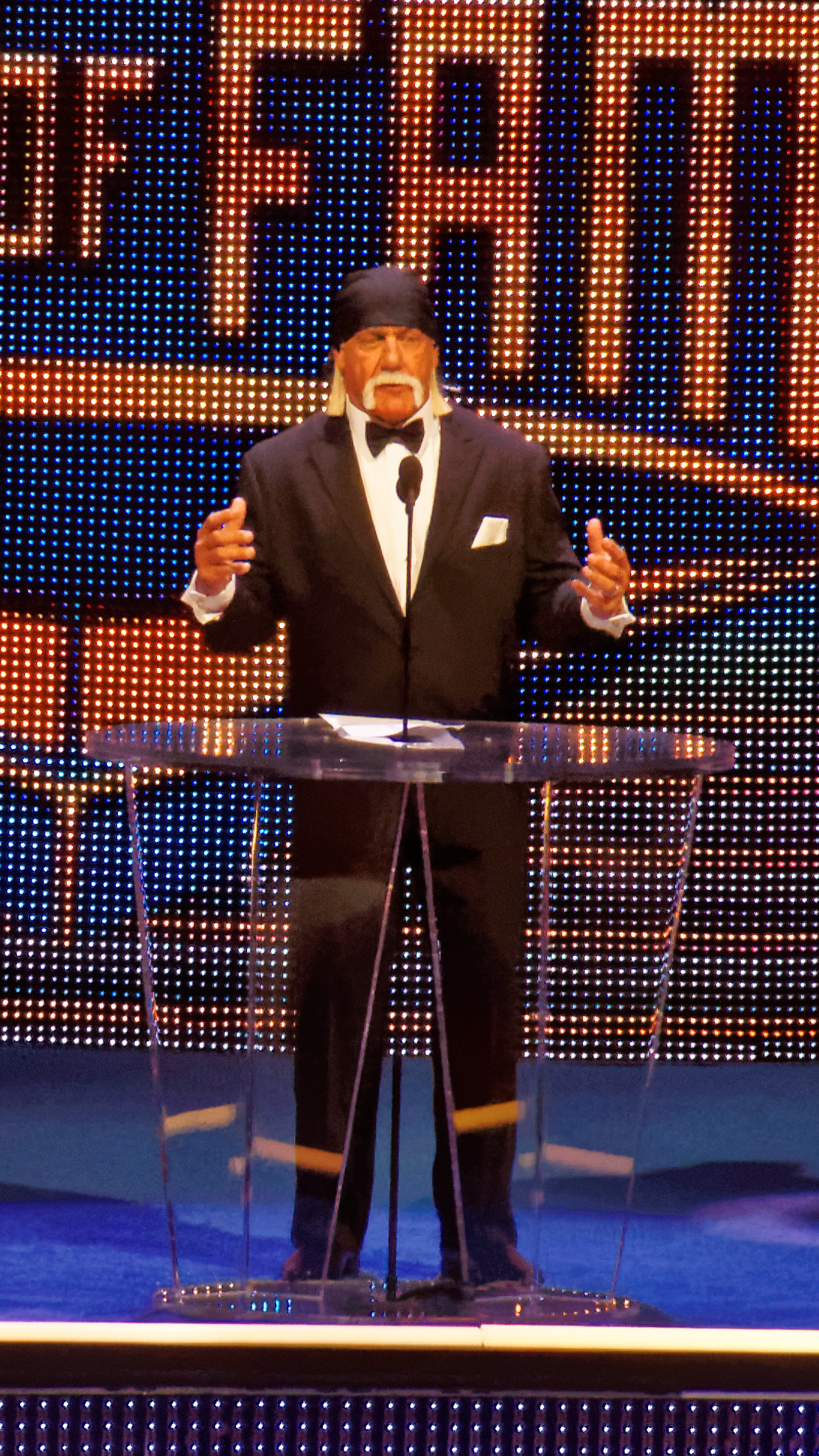
Hulk Hogan achieved numerous accolades throughout his career, including three WWE Hall of Fame inductions.

This is a list of championships and accomplishments of American professional wrestler Hulk Hogan (1953–2025). Hogan made his professional wrestling debut in 1977 and achieved early success in the American Wrestling Association (AWA) and New Japan Pro-Wrestling (NJPW). During the 1980s professional wrestling boom, he emerged as the face of the World Wrestling Federation (WWF, now WWE), where his charismatic persona, large physique, and "Hulkamania" phenomenon helped professional wrestling reach mainstream popularity in the United States. Hogan later joined World Championship Wrestling (WCW) in 1994, where he reinvented himself as the villainous leader of the New World Order (nWo) in 1996, becoming one of the most prominent figures of the Monday Night War, cementing a legacy as one of the most recognizable and influential professional wrestlers in history. Hogan later returned to WWE and also appeared in Total Nonstop Action Wrestling (TNA). Throughout his career, he received numerous championships, honors, and accolades from promotions and publications worldwide.

== Awards and honors ==
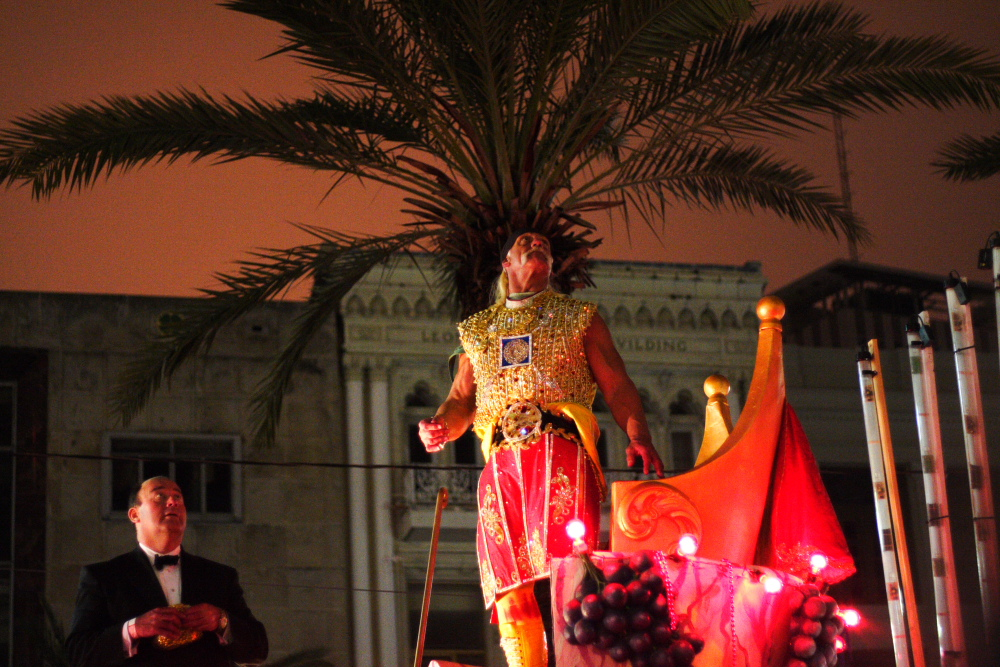
Hogan as King of Bacchus in 2008

Year	Award	Group	Result	Notes	References
1988	Kids' Choice Awards	Favorite Male Athlete	Won		
1999	Teens Choice Awards	Choice Pro Wrestler	Nominated		
2006	Teen Choice Awards	TV – Choice Reality Star (Male)	Nominated	Hogan Knows Best	
2007	Florida Sports Hall of Fame		inducted		
2008	King of the Krewe of Bacchus	—N/a	Won		
2008	Indian Gaming Association Humanitarian of the Year	His work with the Dreamseekers Foundation	Won		
2018	Boys & Girls Clubs of America Alumni Hall of Fame	—N/a	Won		

- In 2007 Hogan served as the Grand Marshall of that years ACDelco NHRA Las Vegas Nationals race.
- In 2015 the WWE held a special ceremony at Madison Square Garden to celebrate the 30 years of “Hulkamaina.” and a banner in Hogans honor was temporarily hung in the arena.
- August 1, 2025 declared Hulk Hogan day in Florida.

== Championships and accomplishments ==
- International Professional Wrestling Hall of Fame
  - Class of 2021

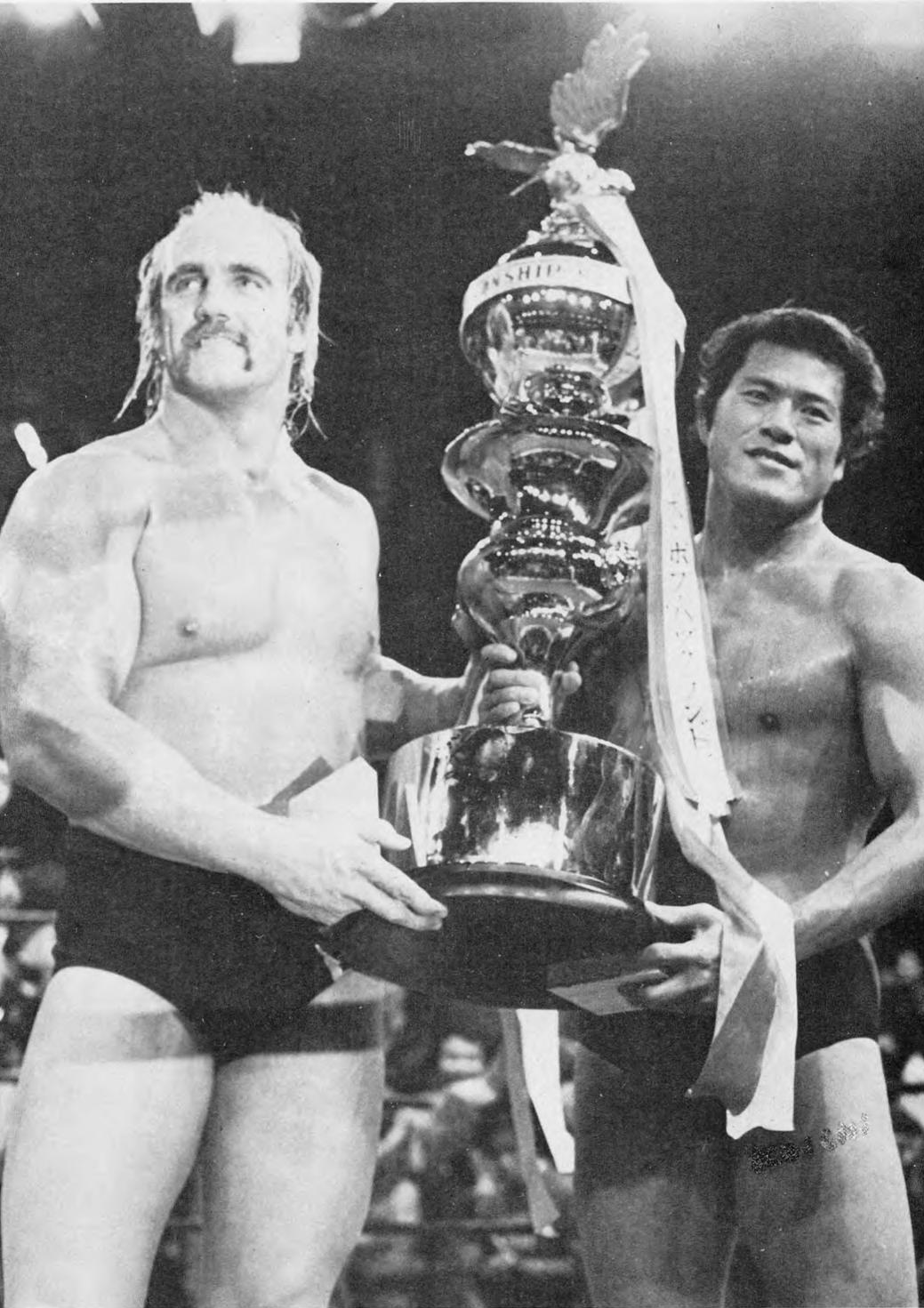
Hogan (left) and Antonio Inoki (right) holding the MSG Tag League Tournament Trophy in 1982

- New Japan Pro-Wrestling
  - IWGP Heavyweight Championship (original version) (1 time)
  - IWGP League Tournament (1983)
  - MSG Tag League Tournament (1982, 1983) – with Antonio Inoki
  - NJPW Trophy (1985)
  - Greatest 18 Club inductee
- Professional Wrestling Hall of Fame and Museum
  - Class of 2003
- Pro Wrestling Illustrated
  - Comeback of the Year (1994, 2002)
  - Feud of the Year (1986) vs. Paul Orndorff
  - Inspirational Wrestler of the Year (1983, 1999)
  - Match of the Year (1985) with Mr. T vs. Roddy Piper and Paul Orndorff at WrestleMania I
  - Match of the Year (1988) vs. André the Giant at The Main Event I
  - Match of the Year (1990) vs. The Ultimate Warrior at WrestleMania VI
  - Match of the Year (2002) vs. The Rock at WrestleMania X8
  - Most Hated Wrestler of the Year (1996, 1998)
  - Most Popular Wrestler of the Year (1985, 1989, 1990)
  - Wrestler of the Year (1987, 1991, 1994)
  - Ranked No. 1 of the top 500 singles wrestlers in the PWI 500 in 1991
  - Ranked No. 1 of the top 500 singles wrestlers of the PWI Years in 2003
  - Ranked No. 44 and No. 57 of the top 100 tag teams of the PWI Years with Antonio Inoki and Randy Savage in 2003
- Southeastern Championship Wrestling
  - NWA Southeastern Heavyweight Championship (Northern Division) (1 time)
  - NWA Southeastern Heavyweight Championship (Southern Division) (2 times)
- Sports Illustrated
  - Ranked No. 2 of the 20 Greatest WWE Wrestlers of All Time
- Super World of Sports
  - SuperWrestle Trophy (1991)
- Tokyo Sports
  - Best Foreigner Award (1983)
  - Match of the Year (1991) vs. Genichiro Tenryu on December 12, 1991
- Total Nonstop Action Wrestling
  - TNA Year End Award (1 time)
    - Memorable Moment of the Year (2003) Jeff Jarrett attacks Hulk Hogan in Japan

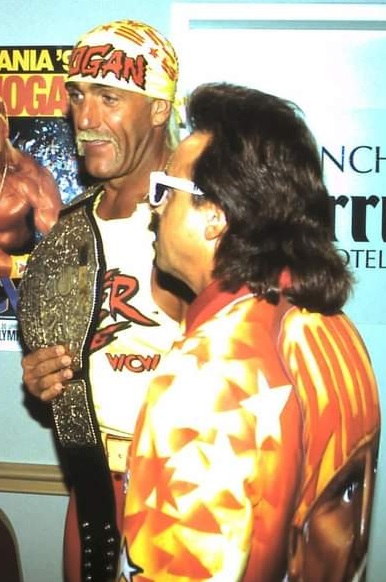
Hogan was a six-time WCW World Heavyweight Champion, pictured alongside Jimmy Hart during his first reign in 1994

- World Championship Wrestling
  - WCW World Heavyweight Championship (6 times)

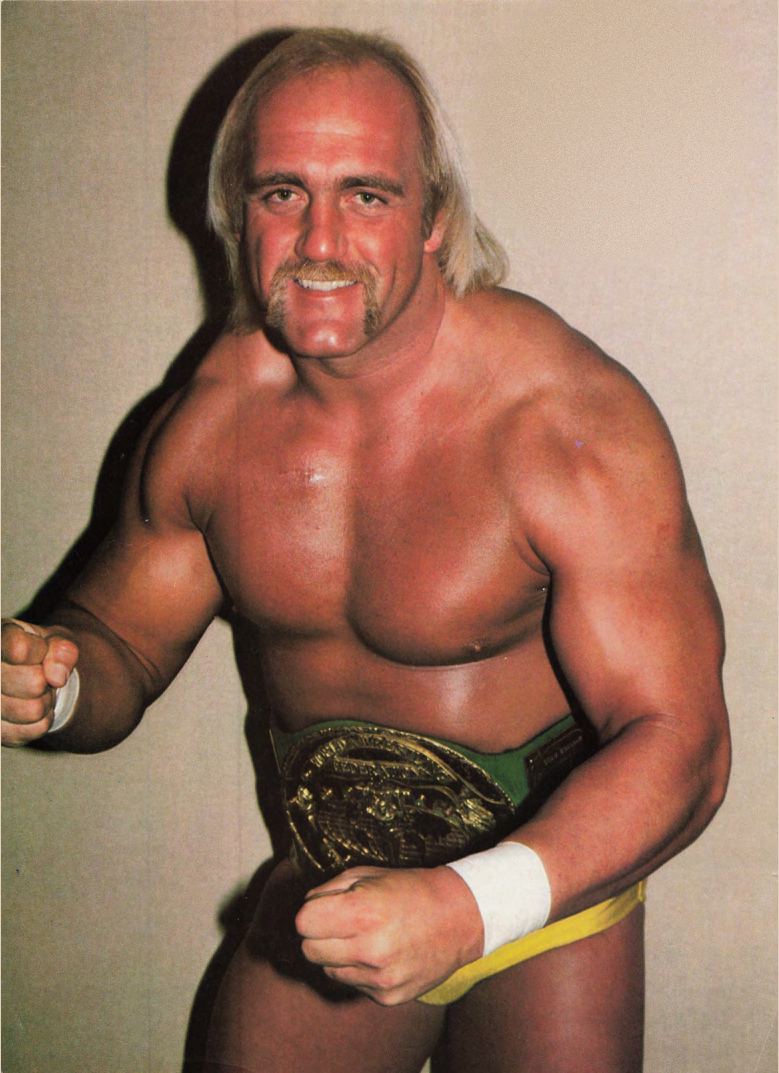
Hogan was a six-time WWE Champion, pictured here during his first reign c. 1984

- World Wrestling Federation / World Wrestling Entertainment / WWE
  - WWF/WWE Championship (6 times)
  - WWE Tag Team Championship (1 time) – with Edge
  - Royal Rumble (1990, 1991)
  - WWE Hall of Fame (3 times)
    - Class of 2005 – individually
    - Class of 2020 – as a member of the New World Order
    - WWE Bronze Statue (2026)
    - Class of 2026 – Immortal Moment – vs André the Giant at WrestleMania III
- Wrestling Observer Newsletter
  - Strongest Wrestler (1983)
  - Best Babyface (1982–1991)
  - Best Box Office Draw (1997)
  - Best Gimmick (1996) as a member of New World Order
  - Feud of the Year (1986) vs. Paul Orndorff
  - Feud of the Year (1996) as a member of New World Order vs. World Championship Wrestling
  - Most Charismatic (1985–1987, 1989–1991)
  - Most Embarrassing Wrestler (1995, 1996, 1999, 2000)
  - Most Obnoxious (1994, 1995)
  - Most Overrated (1985, 1986, 1994–1998)
  - Most Unimproved (1994, 1995)
  - Readers' Least Favorite Wrestler (1985, 1986, 1991, 1994–1999)
  - Worst Feud of the Year (1991) vs. Sgt. Slaughter
  - Worst Feud of the Year (1995) vs. The Dungeon of Doom
  - Worst Feud of the Year (1998) vs. The Warrior
  - Worst Feud of the Year (2000) vs. Billy Kidman
  - Worst on Interviews (1995)
  - Worst Wrestler (1997)
  - Worst Worked Match of the Year (1987) vs. André the Giant at WrestleMania III
  - Worst Worked Match of the Year (1996) with Randy Savage vs. Arn Anderson, Meng, The Barbarian, Ric Flair, Kevin Sullivan, Z-Gangsta, and The Ultimate Solution in a Towers of Doom match at Uncensored
  - Worst Worked Match of the Year (1997) vs. Roddy Piper at SuperBrawl VII
  - Worst Worked Match of the Year (1998) vs. The Warrior at Halloween Havoc
  - Wrestling Observer Newsletter Hall of Fame (Class of 1996)
