= Kota Matsuda =

Japanese politician

- 松田 公太
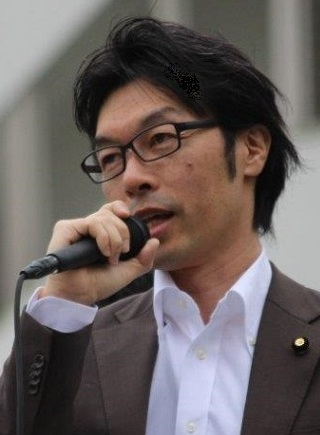
- Matsuda in 2015

President of the Assembly to Energize Japan
- In office 1 January 2015 – 2 June 2016
- Preceded by: Position established
- Succeeded by: Antonio Inoki

Member of the House of Councilors
- In office 26 July 2010 – 25 July 2016
- Preceded by: Seat established
- Succeeded by: Kentaro Asahi
- Constituency: Tokyo at-large

Personal details
- Born: 3 December 1968 (age 57) Shiogama, Miyagi, Japan
- Party: Assembly to Energize Japan (2015–2018)
- Other political affiliations: Your Party (2010–2014); Independent (2014–2015)
- Education: University of Tsukuba
- Occupation: Entrepreneur, politician
- Known for: Founder of Tully's Coffee Japan; former member of the House of Councillors

Kota Matsuda (or Kouta Matsuda) (born 3 December 1968) is a Japanese entrepreneur, business executive, and former politician. He is best known as the founder and former president and CEO of Tully's Coffee Japan, and as a former member of Japan's House of Councillors representing the Tokyo at-large district from 2010 to 2016. Matsuda also served as the leader of the political party The Assembly to Energize Japan (日本を元気にする会) from 2015 to 2016.

== Early life and education ==
Matsuda was born in Shiogama, Miyagi Prefecture, Japan, on 3 December 1968. He spent part of his childhood abroad, living in Senegal and the United States before returning to Japan. He graduated from the University of Tsukuba in 1990.

== Business career ==
After graduating, Matsuda joined Sanwa Bank (now part of MUFG Bank). In 1997, he left the bank and founded Tully's Coffee Japan, opening the first Japanese branch of the Seattle-based chain in Ginza, Tokyo.

Under Matsuda's leadership, the company grew rapidly to become Japan's second-largest specialty coffee chain, with more than 300 outlets nationwide by the early 2000s. Tully's Coffee Japan was listed on the Tokyo Stock Exchange in 2001.

After stepping down from Tully's, Matsuda became involved in several other ventures in the food and beverage sector, including Eggs 'n Things Japan, where he oversaw the restaurant brand's expansion into Japan and other Asian markets. He later diversified into renewable energy, hospitality, and technology investments through his private firm KooJoo Co., Ltd. and advisory roles at Japanese corporations.

== Political career ==
In July 2010, Matsuda was elected to Japan's House of Councillors as a representative of the Tokyo at-large district. He was a member of Your Party (みんなの党) until its dissolution in December 2014. Following the party's disbandment, Matsuda announced the formation of a new political group, saying he aimed to "energize Japan through reform and innovation."

In January 2015, Matsuda officially founded the centrist political party The Assembly to Energize Japan (日本を元気にする会), and became its leader. He served until his term in the House of Councillors ended on 25 July 2016.

During his time in the Diet, Matsuda focused on entrepreneurship, deregulation, and innovation policy, advocating for reforms to make it easier for small and medium-sized enterprises to expand internationally.

== Later career ==
After leaving politics, Matsuda returned to private enterprise. He has served as an outside director of Vector Inc., one of Japan's largest PR and communications groups, and continued to develop ventures in the renewable energy sector, particularly in biomass and solar energy in the Tōhoku region following the 2011 Tōhoku earthquake and tsunami. He has also been an active commentator and lecturer on entrepreneurship, business ethics, and innovation policy in Japan.

== Personal life and views ==
Matsuda's international upbringing — particularly his years in Africa and the United States — has influenced his philosophy of cross-cultural entrepreneurship. He has stated that his goal as both a businessperson and policymaker is to "connect people and ideas across borders" and to encourage "positive risk-taking" in Japan's corporate culture.

== See also ==
- The Assembly to Energize Japan
- Your Party
