= YP =

YP may refer to:

== Politics ==
- Your Party (UK), political party founded in 2025
- Yurt Partisi, or the Homeland Party, Turkey
- Yukon Party, a centre-right party in Yukon, Canada

== Publications ==
- YP.com, an online local business directory
- The Yorkshire Post, an English newspaper

== Science and technology ==
- Yellow Pages (computing), now Network Information Service
- Yersinia pestis, a bacterium that causes plague
- YP-, prefix for Yepp audio player models
- Yttrium phosphide, a chemical compound

== Other uses ==
- YP (rapper), (born Pio Misa), Australian rapper and part of Australian drill and rap group Onefour
- Yard patrol boat, a type of training craft, by US Navy hull classification symbol
- Y P Desert, a desert in Idaho and Nevada in the United States
- The YP Foundation, a charitable trust for young people in India

== See also ==
- Your Party (disambiguation)
- YPS (disambiguation)
- Wipe (disambiguation)
