= Tian Bing =

Chinese professional wrestler

Personal information
- Born: Wang Bin; April 14, 1994 (age 32) Anhui, China

Professional wrestling career
- Ring name(s): Bin Wang; Tian Bing; Wang Bin
- Billed height: 6 ft 2.8 in (1.90 m)
- Billed weight: 220 lb (100 kg)
- Billed from: Shanghai, China
- Trained by: Antonio Inoki
- Debut: December 31, 2013

Tian Bing
- Chinese: 天兵
Transcriptions
Standard Mandarin
- Hanyu Pinyin: Tián bīng

Wang Bin
- Chinese: 王彬
Transcriptions
Standard Mandarin
- Hanyu Pinyin: Wáng bīn

Wang Bin (Chinese: 王彬; born April 14, 1994), is a Chinese professional wrestler, using the ring name Tian Bing. He is best known for his time in WWE, and for being the first wrestler from mainland China to compete in the company.

== Professional wrestling career ==
=== Inoki Genome Federation (2013–2016) ===
Wang debuted in the Inoki Genome Federation (IGF) on December 31, 2013, defeating Kendo Kashin at the Inoki Bom-Ba-Ye 2013 event. Wang continued to wrestle for IGF for three years before leaving for the WWE. He wrestled his last IGF match on May 29, 2016, teaming with Alexander Otsuka to defeat the team of Pancrase legends Masakatsu Funaki and Takaku Fuke at the Genome36 event.

=== WWE (2016–2018) ===
On June 16, 2016, WWE officially announced Wang's signing to the company. Although being promoted as WWE's first mainland Chinese developmental talent, Wang was preceded by Kenny Li six years before him.

On the October 26, 2016 episode NXT, Wang made his television debut under the ring name Tian Bing, teaming with Ho Ho Lun in a losing effort against #DIY in the first round of the Dusty Rhodes Tag Team Classic tournament. He competed in the André the Giant Memorial battle royal at WrestleMania 33, where he eliminated Fandango and Tyler Breeze before being eliminated by Dolph Ziggler. Bing would make an appearance on the prerecorded episode of NXT on October 17, 2018, teaming with Rocky, in a losing effort to the team of Oney Lorcan and Danny Burch. He was released from his contract on October 19.
