= IWGP Heavyweight Championship (IGF) =

Japanese professional wrestling championship

Details
- Promotion: Inoki Genome Federation; New Japan Pro-Wrestling
- Date established: June 29, 2007
- Date retired: February 17, 2008 (Unified with NJPW's IWGP Heavyweight Championship)

Other names
- NWA Japan Championship (NWA); IWGP World Heavyweight Championship (TNA); IWGP 3rd Belt (Note: This is sometimes written as "IWGP Third Belt.") (NJPW)
Statistics
- First champion: Brock Lesnar
- Final champion: Shinsuke Nakamura
- Most reigns: All titleholders (1)
- Longest reign: Brock Lesnar (629 days)
- Shortest reign: Shinsuke Nakamura (<1 day)
- Oldest champion: Kurt Angle (38 years, 203 days)
- Youngest champion: Shinsuke Nakamura (27 years, 358 days)

The IWGP Heavyweight Championship (IWGPヘビー級王座, IWGP hebī-kyū ōza) was a professional wrestling world heavyweight championship introduced by New Japan Pro-Wrestling (NJPW) in 1987. This article covers the interpretation of the title's history according to Inoki Genome Federation (IGF) and its founder Antonio Inoki. Both promotions agreed on the title's history up to July 15, 2006, when Brock Lesnar, who was the reigning champion, was stripped of the title by NJPW. Inoki saw this event as an error made by NJPW and spawned the IGF version of the title's history, with Lesnar still recognized as the official champion.

IGF was a territory of the National Wrestling Alliance (NWA), thus the title was additionally recognized by the NWA as the NWA Japan Championship. NJPW recognized the title as the IWGP 3rd Belt (IWGP 3rdベルト, IWGP sādo beruto), a championship that was merely represented by a previous (third) version of the IWGP Heavyweight Championship's title belt. The title's creation also saw the involvement of Total Nonstop Action Wrestling (TNA), which additionally recognized it as the IWGP World Heavyweight Championship. TNA assisted in the title's retirement in 2008 when TNA wrestler Kurt Angle lost to Shinsuke Nakamura to unify Angle's IGF title with Nakamura's NJPW-recognized IWGP Heavyweight Championship. The NJPW-recognized IWGP Heavyweight Championship was retired in 2021, before being reactivated in 2026.

As a professional wrestling championship, the title was won via a scripted ending to a match or awarded to a wrestler because of a storyline. All title changes occurred at IGF- or NJPW-promoted events. There were a total of three reigns among three wrestlers during the title's brief history.

== History ==
On October 8, 2005, at New Japan Pro-Wrestling's (NJPW) Toukon Souzou New Chapter event in Tokyo, Japan, Brock Lesnar defeated Kazuyuki Fujita and Masahiro Chono in a Three Way match for the IWGP Heavyweight Championship. He held the title for 280 days, having three successful defenses, until he failed to show up for a scheduled title defense. NJPW thus stripped Lesnar of the championship on July 15, 2006. Lesnar cited visa issues along with NJPW owing him compensation as his reasons for failing to appear at the planned title defense. After this series of events, NJPW founder Antonio Inoki left NJPW and created a new promotion, Inoki Genome Federation (IGF). Inoki then recognized Lesnar as the IWGP Heavyweight Champion due to Lesnar never having lost the championship in a match and Lesnar still maintaining physical possession of the title belt. NJPW recognized Lesnar as the IWGP 3rd Belt Champion and not the IWGP Heavyweight Champion, maintaining their stance on having stripped him of the title in 2006.

On June 29, 2007, IGF held its debut show with Lesnar defending the IWGP Heavyweight Championship against Kurt Angle in the main event. Angle defeated Lesnar to win the championship and went on to appear in the American Total Nonstop Action Wrestling (TNA) promotion with the physical title belt. TNA also referred to the title belt as the IWGP Heavyweight Championship in the same manner as IGF, recognizing Angle as the official IWGP Heavyweight Champion. TNA occasionally referred to the title as the "IWGP World Heavyweight Championship" to match Angle's TNA World Heavyweight Championship. NJPW did not recognize Angle as the IWGP Heavyweight Champion, instead it viewed Angle as the second IWGP 3rd Belt holder.

Angle went on to have two successful defenses as champion. His first defense came in TNA in a feud against Samoa Joe. Angle first appeared with the title belt in TNA on the July 5, 2007, episode of TNA's television program TNA Impact!. The title belt became relevant to the storyline rivalry between Joe and Angle heading into TNA's Hard Justice pay-per-view (PPV) event. Leading up to TNA's Victory Road PPV event on July 15, 2007, TNA X Division Champion Joe and TNA World Heavyweight Champion Angle teamed together to face TNA World Tag Team Champions Team 3D (Brother Devon and Brother Ray) in a Tag Team match with the stipulation being whoever scored the pinfall or submission for their team won the championship of the person pinned or made to submit. Joe pinned Brother Ray in the bout, thus winning the World Tag Team Championship for himself and a partner of his choosing. Joe chose to hold the title alone and challenged Angle to a Winner Take All match at Hard Justice for the TNA World Heavyweight, TNA X Division, TNA World Tag Team, and the IWGP Championships on the July 19 2007, episode of Impact!. Angle accepted the match, with Joe and Angle facing at Hard Justice on August 12, 2007 in Orlando, Florida for all of the titles. Angle defeated Joe at the event to win the TNA World Tag Team and TNA X Division Championships, while retaining the TNA World Heavyweight and IWGP Championships.

Afterwards, TNA slowly fazed out the championship from their programming with Angle going on to defend the IWGP title at IGF shows. With NJPW and TNA forming a working relationship, Angle also defended the title at NJPW shows, where the title was referred to as the IWGP 3rd Belt. Angle's second defense of the title was at NJPW's Wrestle Kingdom II in Tokyo Dome event on January 4, 2008, where he defeated former NJPW-recognized IWGP Heavyweight Champion Yuji Nagata to retain the IWGP 3rd Belt. Angle's third defense was against then-NJPW-recognized IWGP Heavyweight Champion Shinsuke Nakamura in a unification match on February 17, 2008 at NJPW's Circuit 2008 New Japan ISM event. Angle lost the match and the existence of the IGF-recognized IWGP Heavyweight Championship ended. IGF later introduced another title three years later with the IGF Championship on August 22, 2011.

== Belt designs ==
The title design featured a black leather base with five gold plates spaced evenly apart and the center plate being the largest. On the center plate, the words "IWGP Heavyweight Champion" were featured alongside the caricature of an eagle or similar bird of prey. (Note: This description is based on the design of the IWGP Heavyweight Championship, as seen in the images throughout the article.)

== Reigns ==
The inaugural champion was Brock Lesnar, who was recognized by IGF as the official IWGP Heavyweight Champion. There were a total of three reigns among three wrestlers during the title's brief history before being unified with the NJPW-recognized IWGP Heavyweight Championship.

Names
Names	Dates	Notes	Ref(s).
IWGP Heavyweight Championship	July 15, 2006 – February 17, 2008	Name used by IGF during the title's existence.	
NWA Japan Championship	July 15, 2006 – February 17, 2008	Name used by NWA during the title's existence.	
IWGP World Heavyweight Championship	July 15, 2006 – February 17, 2008	Name used by TNA during the title's existence.	
IWGP 3rd Belt	July 15, 2006 – February 17, 2008	Name used by NJPW during the title's existence.	

Key
No.	Overall reign number
Reign	Reign number for the specific champion
Days	Number of days held
Defenses	Number of successful defenses

No.	Champion	Championship change			Reign statistics			Notes	Ref.
No.	Champion	Date	Event	Location	Reign	Days	Defenses	Notes	Ref.
New Japan Pro-Wrestling (NJPW) & Inoki Genome Federation (IGF)
44 (1)	Brock Lesnar	October 8, 2005	Toukon Souzou New Chapter	Tokyo, Japan	1	629 (Note: Lesnar's reign is calculated from the day he won the NJPW-recognized IWGP Heavyweight Championship until the day he lost the IWGP Heavyweight Championship as recognized by IGF. As such, it excludes him being stripped of the title and predates the split in the championship lineage.)	3	Defeated Kazuyuki Fujita and Masahiro Chono in a Three Way match for the IWGP Heavyweight Championship. New Japan Pro-Wrestling stripped Lesnar of the title on July 15, 2006. IGF, however, considered his reign still active.	
45 (2)	Kurt Angle	June 29, 2007	Toukon Bom-Ba-Ye	Tokyo, Japan	1	233	2		
New Japan Pro-Wrestling (NJPW)
46 (3)	Shinsuke Nakamura	February 17, 2008	Circuit 2008 New Japan ISM	Tokyo, Japan	2	<1	0	Defeated Kurt Angle to unify IGF's IWGP Heavyweight Championship and NJPW's IWGP Heavyweight Championship.	
—	Unified	February 17, 2008	Circuit 2008 New Japan ISM	Tokyo, Japan	—	—	—	Titles are unified and the IGF version of the IWGP Heavyweight Championship is deactivated. IGF later replaces the title with the IGF Championship in 2011.	
