= Asia-Pacific Federation of Wrestling =

Group of Asian professional wrestling promotions

- アジア太平洋プロレス連盟
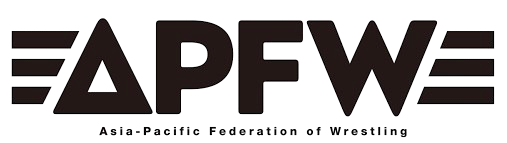
- Abbreviation: APFW
- Formation: October 10, 2023; 2 years ago
- Type: Association
- Purpose: Promotion of professional wrestling in Asia and the Pacific

The Asia-Pacific Federation of Wrestling (Japanese: アジア太平洋プロレス連盟, Hepburn: Ajia Taiheiyō Puroresu Renmei; APFW) is an association of several professional wrestling promotions in the Asia–Pacific, acting as a governing body and industry group with the goal of promoting professional wrestling across Asia.

== History ==
The association establishment was announced during a New Japan Pro-Wrestling (NJPW) and Stardom joint business strategy presentation held in Tokyo at the Hikosen Theater. The name of the organization was initially translated in English as "Asian Pacific Pro-Wrestling Alliance". The purpose of the association, as stated by Bushiroad owner Takaaki Kidani, was to "further promote professional wrestling in the Asia–Pacific region through cooperative relationships with each organization".

On January 5, 2024, representatives from all member promotions attended a press conference. During the event, the translated name was changed to Asia-Pacific Federation of Wrestling (APFW), a logo was revealed, and it was announced that NJPW would hold an event in Taipei in April, with the event being the first sanctioned by the APFW. NJPW's Wrestling World 2024 in Taiwan, the first event sanctioned by the APFW, was held on April 14. On December 14, 2024, the Antonio Inoki Memorial Show was organized in Shanghai, China by various APFW promotions.

== Members ==
- (China) Dragon Fighting Wrestling
- (Singapore) Grapplemax Pro Wrestling Studios
- New Japan Pro-Wrestling
- (Taiwan) Puzzle
- Setup Thailand Pro Wrestling
- (Japan) World Wonder Ring Stardom

== Notable events ==
=== Wrestling World 2024 in Taiwan ===
The inaugural APFW event, titled "Weicker presents Wrestling World 2024 in Taiwan", took place on April 14, 2024 at Zepp New Taipei in Taipei, Taiwan. The event, organized by APFW member New Japan Pro-Wrestling (NJPW), included a four-team tournament to determine the 27th NEVER Openweight 6-Man Tag Team Champions, following the title's vacating due to Kazuchika Okada's departure from NJPW.

No.	Results	Stipulations	Times
1^{P}	Touyu defeated Axe Wang	Singles match	8:53
2	Hiroshi Tanahashi, Toru Yano, and Boltin Oleg defeated United Empire (Great-O-Khan, Francesco Akira, and Callum Newman)	NEVER Openweight 6-Man Tag Team Championship Tournament First Round match	11:04
3	House of Torture (Evil, Sho, and Yoshinobu Kanemaru) defeated Los Ingobernables de Japón (Shingo Takagi, Yota Tsuji and Bushi)	NEVER Openweight 6-Man Tag Team Championship Tournament First Round match	9:50
4	Satoshi Kojima and Tiger Mask defeated El Desperado and Shoma Kato	Tag team match	11:11
5	Starlight Kid defeated Hanako	Singles match	11:38
6	Douki defeated Kosei Fujita	IWGP Junior Heavyweight Championship #1 Contendership match	12:11
7	Bishamon (Hirooki Goto and Yoshi-Hashi) (c) defeated Just 5 Guys (Sanada and Yuya Uemura)	Tag team match for the IWGP Tag Team Championship	20:04
8	Hiroshi Tanahashi, Toru Yano, and Boltin Oleg defeated House of Torture (Evil, Sho, and Yoshinobu Kanemaru)	Tournament final for the vacant NEVER Openweight 6-Man Tag Team Championship	15:32
(c) / – the champion(s) heading into the match; P / – the match was broadcast on the pre-show

=== Antonio Inoki Memorial Show ===
An APFW event, titled "Antonio Inoki Memorial Show: Immortal Fighting Spirit", took place on December 14, 2024 at Modern Sky Lab in Shanghai, China. The event, held in tribute to Antonio Inoki, was organized by APFW members NJPW and Dragon Fighting Wrestling and featured the participation of other promotions from the Asia–Pacific, like the Inoki Genome Federation, Infin Pro-Wrestling, and the Hong Kong Pro Wrestling Federation.

No.	Results	Stipulations
1	Liu Xinxi defeated Gao Jingjia and Yang Hao	Triple Threat match
2	T-Light and Zombie Dragon defeated Big Ben and Big Sam	Tag team match
3	Jason Lee vs. Zhao Junjie ended in a no contest	Singles match
4	Cheng Da and Chen Wenbin (c) defeated Feng Jianlang and Wang Xixuan	Hardcore tag team match for the KOPW Tag Team Championship
5	Boltin Oleg defeated Yuji Nagata	Singles match
6	Lin Dongxuan and Wang Junjie defeated Bitman and Michael Su	Tag team match
7	United Empire (Francesco Akira and Great-O-Khan) defeated Master Wato and Satoshi Kojima	Tag team match
(c) / – the champion(s) heading into the match

== See also ==
- Global Professional Wrestling Alliance
- United Japan Pro-wrestling
