= Real World Championship =

New Japan Pro-Wrestling championship (1972)

World Heavyweight Championship

Details
- Promotion: New Japan Pro-Wrestling (NJPW)
- Date established: 1972
Statistics
- First champion: Karl Gotch
- Final champion: Karl Gotch
- Most reigns: Karl Gotch (2 reigns)
- Shortest reign: Antonio Inoki (6 days)

The World Heavyweight Championship (世界ヘビー級王座, sekai hebī-kyū ōza), also referred to as the Real World Championship was a championship established and promoted by New Japan Pro-Wrestling. Karl Gotch was billed as a first champion by New Japan Pro-Wrestling. It used the belt (or belt replica) of American Wrestling Alliance (Ohio)'s AWA World Heavyweight Championship, (Note: Not to be confused with the AWA World Heavyweight Championship promoted by the Verne Gagne's American Wrestling Alliance.) which was held by Karl Gotch from September 11, 1962 to September 7, 1964. The title was successfully defended only once, by Antonio Inoki against Red Pimpernel on day 12 of New Golden Series on October 9, 1972. Karl Gotch was the final champion in his second reign, winning the title from Antonio Inoki on October 10, 1972.

== Title history ==
Over the championship's one-year history, there were only two reigns between two champions. Karl Gotch was the inaugural champion with most reigns, at two times. Gotch was also the final champion.

Key
No.	Overall reign number
Reign	Reign number for the specific champion
Days	Number of days held
Defences	Number of successful defences
N/A	Unknown information
(NET)	Championship change took place "no earlier than" the date listed

No.	Champion	Championship change			Reign statistics			Notes	Ref.
No.	Champion	Date	Event	Location	Reign	Days	Defences	Notes	Ref.
New Japan Pro Wrestling (NJPW)
1	Karl Gotch	January 13, 1972 (NET)	N/A	N/A	1	N/A	0	Recognized as a champion by NJPW using the belt (or its replica) of AWA World Heavyweight Championship.	
2	Antonio Inoki	October 4, 1972	New Golden Series	Tokyo, Japan	1	6	1	Won the title via count-out. Lou Thesz was the special guest referee.	
3	Karl Gotch	October 10, 1972	New Golden Series	Osaka, Japan	2	N/A	0		
—	Deactivated	October 10, 1972 (NET)	—	—	—	—	—	The championship was abandoned without any formal announcement.	

== See also ==
- NWF Heavyweight Championship, the championship that succeeded the Real World Championship as the top title in NJPW

== Notes ==
Sporting positions
Preceded by First	New Japan Pro-Wrestling's top heavyweight championship 1972	Succeeded by NWF Heavyweight Championship
