= Assembly to Energize Japan =

Assembly to Energize Japan 日本を元気にする会 Nippon wo Genkinisuru Kai
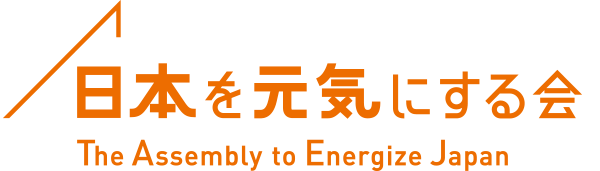
- President: Kota Matsuda
- Secretary-General: Kota Matsuda
- Founded: January 1, 2015
- Dissolved: 10 December 2018
- Ideology: Economic liberalism E-democracy

Website
- nippongenkikai.jp

The Assembly to Energize Japan, in Japanese Nippon wo Genkinisuru Kai (日本を元気にする会) was a Japanese political party.

It was formed on 1 January 2015 by Councillors Kota Matsuda, formerly of the now-defunct Your Party and Antonio Inoki, formerly of the Party for Future Generations.

== Overview ==
After the official dissolution of Your Party on 28 November 2014, Kota Matsuda and three others, along with former Party for Future Generations member Antonio Inoki resigned from their respective parties and formed a parliamentary group on 18 December. The party was officially launched on 1 January 2015.

After the 2016 election, AEJ had only two remaining members of the Diet, and the House of Councillors caucus was dissolved by the first post-election Diet session: Antonio Inoki joined the Independent Club (Mushozoku Club, 無所属クラブ), another small YP successor, and Kazuyuki Yamaguchi became an independent. (Inoki later became an independent and sits with the joint DPFP-LP House of Councillors caucus in 2019, Yamaguchi joined Nippon Ishin no Kai in 2019.)

The party was officially disbanded on December 10, 2018.
