= Professional wrestling personalities in politics =

Wrestling personalities involved in politics

Many wrestlers and wrestling personalities across the world have served in elected and appointed office throughout the years.

== Currently serving in office ==
| Wrestler or Personality | Country Elected In | Name of Highest Elected or Appointed Office | Year Term started |
|---|---|---|---|
| Billy Ken Kid | Japan | City Council Member Kawanishi, Hyōgo | 2026 |
| Mike Furnas | USA | Commissioner, Ottawa County, Oklahoma | |
| Hiroshi Hase | Japan | Governor of Ishikawa Prefecture | 2022 |
| Tim Horner | USA | County Commissioner, Hamblen County, Tennessee | 2018 |
| Linda McMahon | USA | United States Secretary of Education | 2024 |
| Matt Morgan | USA | District 4 City Commissioner of Longwood, Florida. | 2017 |
| Ian Riccaboni | USA | Director, Salisbury Township School District School Board | 2023 |
| Raymond Rougeau | Canada | Mayor of Rawdon, Quebec | 2021 |
| Rick Steiner | USA | Cherokee County School District (Georgia) School Board | 2006 |
| Hiroko Suzuki | Japan | Funabashi city council | 2015 |

== Previously elected or appointed ==
| Wrestler or Personality | Country Elected In | Name of Highest Elected or Appointed Office | Year Term started |
|---|---|---|---|
| Jim Barnett | USA | National Council of the Arts | 1977 |
| Maven Bentley | USA | Cheltenham Township School District School Board | 2019 |
| Billy Two Rivers | Canada | Kahnawake Chief | 1996 |
| B. Brian Blair | USA | Hillsborough County, Florida Commissioner | 2004 |
| The Great Sasuke | Japan | Iwate Prefectural Assembly | 2003 |
| Tony Halme | Finland | Parliament of Finland | 2003 |
| Antonio Inoki | Japan | Japanese House of Councillors | 1989; 2013 |
| Shinobu Kandori | Japan | Japanese House of Councillors | 2006 |
| Kane (Glenn Jacobs) | USA | Mayor of Knox County, Tennessee | 2018 |
| Sonny Myers | USA | Buchanan County, Missouri Sherriff | 1968 |
| Atsushi Onita | Japan | Japanese House of Councillors | 2001 |
| Jesse Ventura | USA | Governor of Minnesota | 1998 |

== Ran unsuccessfully ==
| Wrestler or Personality | Country Office Sought In | Name of Office Pursued | Year Pursued |
|---|---|---|---|
| Big Boss Man | USA | County Commissioner, Paulding County, Georgia | 2004 |
| Blue Demon Jr. | Mexico | Mayor, Gustavo A. Madero, Mexico City | 2021 |
| Bob Backlund | USA | United States House of Representatives | 2000 |
| Carístico | Mexico | Mayor, Cuauhtémoc | 2021 |
| Jerry Lawler | USA | Mayor, Memphis, Tennessee | 1999; 2009 |
| Moondog King | Canada | House of Commons of Canada | 2004 |
| Rhyno | USA | Michigan House of Representatives | 2016 |
| Tinieblas | Mexico | Mayor, Venustiano | 2021 |
| Nikolai Volkoff | USA | Maryland House of Delegates | 2006 |
| Whipper Billy Watson | Canada | York East 1965 federal election Candidate | 1965 |
| Drake Younger | USA | Florida House of Representatives | 2022 |

== Other professional wrestlers or personalities involved in politics ==
- WWE Hall of Fame member Donald Trump was elected President of the United States in 2016 and 2024.
- Former WWF World Heavyweight Champion The Iron Sheik worked as a bodyguard for Shah Mohammad Reza Pahlavi and his family for several years.
- National Wrestling Alliance, Pro Wrestling USA, Ring of Honor, and World Championship Wrestling promoter Gary Juster served in former Vice President of the United States Walter Mondale's United States Senate administration.
- Wrestler and All-Star Wrestling founder Jean Rougeau was a personal bodyguard of Legislative Assembly of Quebec member René Lévesque.
