= Naoto Inoki =

Mexican-American professional wrestler

Personal information
- Born: Naoto Antonio Inoki Mexico City, Mexico
- Relatives: Antonio Inoki (grandfather); Mitsuko Baisho (grandmother); Chieko Baisho (great aunt); Juichi Sagara (great uncle); Pablo Inoki (great uncle); Histeria (uncle)

Professional wrestling career
- Ring name(s): Kumo; Naoto Inoki "Prince of Strong Style" Naoto Inoki
- Trained by: Durango Kid; Laberinto; Lucha Wrestling Puroresu; Katsuyori Shibata; NJPW Dojo
- Debut: July 20, 2024

Naoto Antonio Inoki is a Mexican-American professional wrestler. As of November 2026, he is signed to New Japan Pro-Wrestling (NJPW). He is a third-generation professional wrestler, with both his grandfather Antonio Inoki and stepfather Durango Kid also being wrestlers.

== Early life ==
Naoto Inoki was born in Mexico City, Mexico to Hiroko and Simon Inoki and raised in Los Angeles, California, U.S. As a child, Inoki trained in gymnastics, Muay Thai, Brazilian jiu-jitsu, and mixed martial arts, before competing in amateur wrestling for Mira Costa High School.

== Professional wrestling career ==
=== Early appearances and training (2018–2024) ===
Prior to his official professional wrestling debut, Inoki appeared at a Heroes of Lucha Libre event at the Galen Center on June 2, 2018, getting involved in a match between Pierrothito and Mini Rey Misterio and helping Misterio win the match after performing an arm drag on Pierrothito. Inoki began his professional wrestling training under his stepfather Durango Kid at the L.A. Inoki Dojo (also known as the Lucha Wrestling Puroresu Training School), and later trained under Katsuyori Shibata at the NJPW Academy in Carson, California. Inoki would also appear at All Elite Wrestling's 2023 and 2024 WrestleDream events, held in tribute to his late grandfather Antonio Inoki.

=== Independent circuit (2024–2026) ===
On July 20, 2024, Inoki made his professional wrestling debut, defeating Casanova at a Backyard Squabbles event in what was billed as a "shoot wrestling match". In 2026, Inoki adopted a masked persona and began wrestling under the ring name Kumo. Inoki would make his first appearance under the Kumo name on May 3, 2026, at a Lucha Wrestling Puroresu event in Carson, teaming with Último Dragón and Casanova to defeat Durango Kid, Nightmare, and Zodiacal.

=== New Japan Pro-Wrestling (2026–present) ===
In September 2026, Inoki passed a tryout with New Japan Pro-Wrestling (NJPW) and began training at the NJPW Dojo the following month on October 1. On November 18, 2026 (November 17 in Eastern Time), NJPW announced that Inoki had signed a contract with the promotion during a press conference. During the press conference, Inoki announced his intention to perform in NJPW's junior heavyweight division.

== Personal life ==
Naoto is the grandson of professional wrestlers Antonio Inoki and Durango. His great grandfather Felix el Espaniol, great uncle Latigo Negro, uncle Histeria, and cousins Massivo, Histeriosys, and El Hijo de Histeria are all also professional wrestlers. His older brother, Hirota, is a member of the Inoki Genki Factory's board of directors. His grandmother is Japanese actress Mitsuko Baisho, his great aunt is Japanese actress and singer Chieko Baisho, and his great uncles are Japanese-Brazilian karateka Juichi Sagara and Japanese singer and politician Pablo Inoki.
