= YPS =

YPS may refer to:

- Yps (comics), a German magazine (1975–2000)
- Civil Protection Units (YPS), a Kurdish rebel group in Turkey (2015–2025)
- Yellow prussiate of soda, or sodium ferrocyanide
- Yorkshire Philosophical Society (founded 1822)
- Yohanan Petrovsky-Shtern (born 1962), Ukrainian-American historian
- Port Hawkesbury Airport, in Canada (IATA: YPS)
- Youth, Peace, and Security, an agenda of the United Nations

== See also ==
- YP (disambiguation)
