= Inoki Genome Federation =

Japanese professional wrestling and mixed martial arts company

- Acronym: IGF
- Founded: 2007
- Defunct: 2019
- Style: Mixed martial arts Professional wrestling (Shoot-style wrestling)
- Headquarters: Tokyo, Japan
- Founder: Antonio Inoki
- Owner(s): Antonio Inoki (2007–2018); Simon Inoki (2018–2019)
- Parent: Assist Co., Ltd.
- Split from: New Japan Pro-Wrestling
- Predecessor: Universal Fighting-Arts Organization
- Successor: Lucha Wrestling Puroresu; ISM; Hagure IGF International; Eastern Heroes; Inoki Genki Factory
- Website: Official Site of the Inoki Genome Federation (archived)

The Inoki Genome Federation (イノキ・ゲノム・フェデレーション, Inoki Genomu Federēshon) (IGF), also known in China as International Glory Fighting, was a Japanese professional wrestling and mixed martial arts promotion founded by Antonio Inoki in 2007.

== History ==
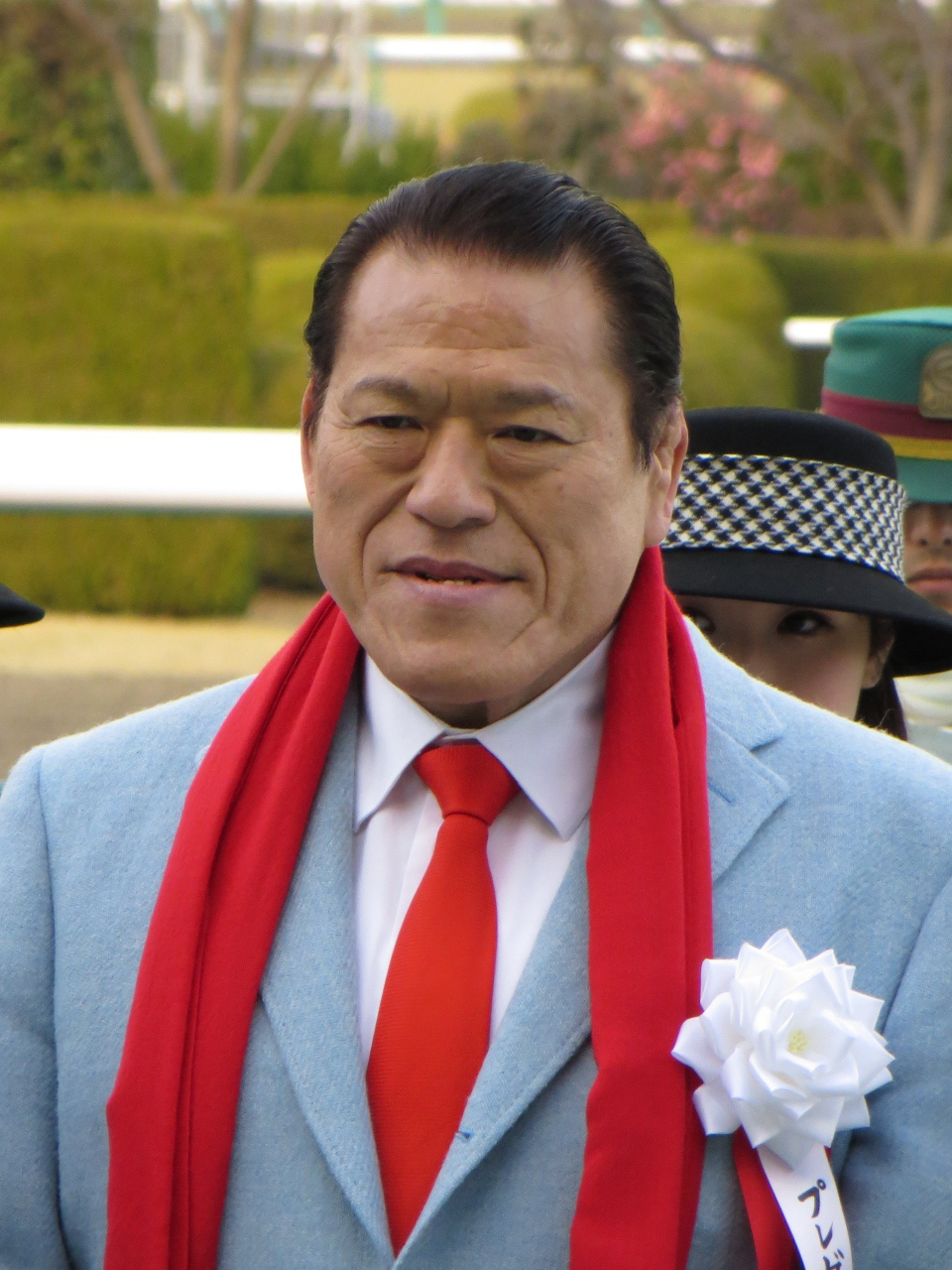
Antonio Inoki, IGF's founder and namesake, in 2012

Antonio Inoki founded the Inoki Genome Federation (IGF) after selling New Japan Pro-Wrestling (NJPW), a promotion he founded in 1972. The first IGF show was held on June 29, 2007 at the Sumo Hall in Tokyo, Japan. The show's main event was a match between Kurt Angle and Brock Lesnar, where they competed for Lesnar's IWGP Heavyweight Championship.

From 2007 to 2008, the IGF served as the Japanese territory of the National Wrestling Alliance.

On December 31, 2010, Shinichi Suzukawa was scheduled to face Bob Sapp in an IGF special Super Heavyweight bout at K-1 Dynamite!! 2010. The fight was to be held under modified MMA rules, with the fighters being barred from wearing gloves, closed-fist strikes being illegal, and palm strikes being permitted. The fight was planned to air on HDNet in North America. However, the fight was canceled due to a last-minute contract dispute with Sapp; the Japanese audience in attendance were told by the K-1 promoters involved in the dispute that Sapp “had lost his will to fight.”

In 2011, the promotion presented a gift to Kim Jong Il, the-then leader of North Korea as part of a diplomatic effort. In August 2014, IGF held two shows in Pyongyang, North Korea.

On December 29, 2014, IGF announced a deal with PPTV to bring its programming to Chinese audiences. In 2015, Durango Kid and Laberinto, two of Inoki's former students, along with karateka Alfredo Perez, established an IGF off-shoot promotion in the United States called Inoki Sports Management, also known as Lucha Wrestling Puroresu. The three men would also re-establish the Inoki Dojo in Los Angeles.

In 2017, Antonio Inoki began distancing himself from the IGF and created a new promotion called ISM. After the creation of ISM, Antonio's son-in-law Simon Inoki gained more influence within the promotion and created a new brand under the IGF banner called Next Exciting Wrestling (NEW). The IGF's inaugural NEW show was held on April 20, 2017. On March 23, 2018, Antonio Inoki sold his part of the promotion and left the IGF. In April 2018, Nosawa Rongai, along with IGF wrestlers Kendo Kashin and Kazuyuki Fujita, created an IGF off-shoot promotion known as Hagure IGF International. A new brand featuring IGF's Chinese wrestlers called Eastern Heroes (东方英雄, Toho Eiyu-den) was later founded by Simon Inoki. On June 26, Eastern Heroes wrestlers participated on night 8 of Pro Wrestling Noah's Navigation with Emerald Spirits tour. The IGF closed on January 9, 2019. After the IGF's closure, Assist Co., Ltd., the promotion's parent company, opened a chain of bakeries, leading to both Kendo Kashin and Simon Inoki to humorously state "IGF has become a bakery".

In August 2022, Antonio Inoki revived the IGF, now standing for the Inoki Genki Factory, to serve as his official management company. On October 1, at age 79, Inoki died from systemic transthyretin amyloidosis. On December 28, the Inoki Genki Factory held their first show, Inoki Bom-Ba-Ye x Ganryujima, a memorial event honoring Inoki organized in collaboration with Samurai Warriors Ganryujima and NJPW. On December 14, 2024, IGF participated in the Antonio Inoki Memorial Show organized in Shanghai, China by NJPW and various Asia-Pacific Federation of Wrestling promotions.

== Roster ==
=== Roster at time of closing ===
- Atsushi Sawada
- Black Tiger V
- Crusher Kawaguchi
- Daichi Hashimoto
- Erik Hammer
- Kazuyuki Fujita
- Keisuke Okuda
- Kendo Kashin
- Kevin Kross
- Knux
- Mason Williams
- Minowaman
- Mitsuyoshi Nakai
- Montanha Silva
- Naoya Ogawa
- Oli Thompson
- Shinichi Suzukawa
- Shinya Aoki
- Shogun Okamoto
- Vito Rea

=== Notable alumni ===
- Alexander Kozlov
- Bobby Lashley
- Brock Lesnar
- Daijiro Matsui
- Erik Paulson
- Harry Smith
- Hideki Suzuki
- Hikaru Sato
- Jerome Le Banner
- Jienotsu (Yuichiro Nagashima)
- Kurt Angle
- Mirko Cro Cop
- Peter Aerts
- Shodai Tiger Mask
- Raj Singh
- Tatsumi Fujinami
- Wang Bin
- Yoshiaki Fujiwara
- Necro Butcher
- X (Durango Kid)

Guests

- Abdullah the Butcher
- The Destroyer
- Dory Funk, Jr.
- Stan Hansen
- Tiger Jeet Singh

Supervisor

- Billy Robinson

== Championships ==
=== IGF Championship ===
IGF Championship

Details
- Promotion: Inoki Genome Federation
- Date established: August 22, 2011
- Date retired: January 9, 2019
Statistics
- First champion: Jérôme Le Banner
- Final champion: Oli Thompson
- Most reigns: All title holders (1)
- Longest reign: Oli Thompson (1105 days)
- Shortest reign: Mirko Cro Cop (153 days)
- Oldest champion: Kazuyuki Fujita (41 years, 272 days)
- Youngest champion: Satoshi Ishii (27 years, 12 days)

In February 2011, IGF started a tournament to determine the first ever IGF Champion, which eventually led to a final match between Jérôme Le Banner and Josh Barnett. However, just days prior to the final match taking place, IGF announced on August 19 that Barnett would not be able to attend the event. On August 22, IGF declared Le Banner the first champion. The title was founded as a professional wrestling championship, but has since December 31, 2013, been contested in legitimate mixed martial arts fights.

==== Title history ====
Key
No.	Overall reign number
Reign	Reign number for the specific champion
Days	Number of days held
Defenses	Number of successful defenses

No.	Champion	Championship change			Reign statistics			Notes	Ref.
No.	Champion	Date	Event	Location	Reign	Days	Defenses	Notes	Ref.
1	Jérôme Le Banner	August 22, 2011	–	–	1	327	6	Declared first champion, after Josh Barnett pulls out of a tournament final match.	
2	Kazuyuki Fujita	July 14, 2012	Genome21	Osaka, Japan	1	535	4		
3	Satoshi Ishii	December 31, 2013	Inoki Bom-Ba-Ye 2013	Tokyo, Japan	1	235	0	With this match the title began to be contested in legitimate mixed martial arts fights. Won by unanimous decision.	
4	Mirko Cro Cop	August 23, 2014	Inoki Genome Fight 2	Tokyo, Japan	1	153	1	Second round doctor stoppage.: 1. def. Satoshi Ishii at Inoki Bom-Ba-Ye 2014 on December 31, 2014	
—	Vacated	January 23, 2015	—	—	—	—	—	Cro Cop was stripped of the title when he signed with the Ultimate Fighting Championship.	
5	Oli Thompson	December 31, 2015	Inoki Bom-Ba-Ye 2015	Tokyo, Japan	1	1,105	0	Defeated Fernando Rodrigues Jr. by TKO to win the IGF World GP and the vacant title.	
—	Deactivated	January 9, 2019	—	—	—	—	—	Retired when promotion closed.	

== Tournaments ==
=== IGF Championship Tournament ===
First round (Genome14, Genome15, and Genome16)
Josh Barnett	Win
Montanha Silva
Bobby Lashley	Win
Keith Hanson
Shinichi Suzukawa	Win
Bob Sapp
Jerome Le Banner	Win
Shinichi Suzukawa

Semifinals (Genome15 and Genome16)
Josh Barnett	Win
Bobby Lashley
Jerome Le Banner	Win
Erik Hammer*

Final; N/A
Jerome Le Banner	Forfeit
Josh Barnett

- Erik Hammer replaced Shinichi Suzukawa in the tournament after defeating Ray Sefo.

=== World Bantamweight Grand Prix ===
- This tournament was co-promoted with DREAM and M-1 Global.

Quarterfinals (DREAM 17)
(Japan) Masakazu Imanari	W
(United States) Abel Cullum	SUB
(Japan) Hideo Tokoro	DEC
(United States) Antonio Banuelos	W
(Brazil) Bibiano Fernandes	W
(Japan) Takafumi Otsuka	SUB
(Russia) Yusup Saadulaev	DEC
(Brazil) Rodolfo Marques	W

Semifinals (Fight For Japan: Genki Desu Ka Omisoka 2011)
(Japan) Masakazu Imanari	DEC
(United States) Antonio Banuelos	W
(Brazil) Bibiano Fernandes	W
(Brazil) Rodolfo Marques	DEC

Final (Fight For Japan: Genki Desu Ka Omisoka 2011)
(United States) Antonio Banuelos	TKO
(Brazil) Bibiano Fernandes	W

=== Inoki Genome Tournament 2012 ===
- This tournament took place entirely on the Genome20 event.

Semifinals
Shinichi Suzukawa	Win
Yusuke Kawaguchi
Atsushi Sawada	Win
Hideki Suzuki

Final
Atsushi Sawada	Win
Shinichi Suzukawa

=== Inoki Genome Tournament 2013 ===
- This tournament took place entirely on the Genome26 event.

Quarterfinals
Hideki Suzuki	Win
Akira Jo
Atsushi Sawada	Win
Shogun Okamoto

Semifinal
Atsushi Sawada	Double Countout
Shinichi Suzukawa*

Final
Hideki Suzuki*	Win
Atsushi Sawada*

- Shinichi Suzukawa received a bye to the semi-finals. Hideki Suzuki received a bye to the final after defeating Crusher Kawaguchi in a match. Atsushi Sawada advanced to the final despite his match against Shinichi Suzukawa ending in a double countout.

=== Road to Inoki Bom-Ba-Ye Challenge Tournament ===
- This tournament took place entirely on the Inoki Bom-Ba-Ye 2014 event.

Semifinals
Yusuke Masuda	W
Takaaki "C-Boy" Oban	DEC
Ryo Sakai	W
Tsuyoshi Kurihara	DEC

Final
Yusuke Masuda	W
Ryo Sakai	DEC

=== IGF World GP ===
- Quarterfinals took place on April 11, 2015 at Inoki Genome Fight 3.
- Semi-finals took place on August 29, 2015 at Inoki Genome Fight 4.
- The final took place on December 31, 2015 at Inoki Bom-Ba-Ye 2015.

Quarterfinals
(Sweden) Yosef Ali Mohammad	TKO
(Netherlands) Dion Staring	Rd 1
(Brazil) Fernando Rodrigues Jr.	TKO
(France) Antony Rea	Rd 1
(United States) Chris Barnett	TKO
(Bulgaria) Emil Zahariev	Rd 2
(England) Oli Thompson	DEC
(Japan) Ikuhisa Minowa	Rd 2

Semifinals
(Sweden) Yosef Ali Mohammad	TKO
(Brazil) Fernando Rodrigues Jr.	Rd 1
(United States) Chris Barnett	DEC
(England) Oli Thompson	Rd 2

Final
(Brazil) Fernando Rodrigues Jr.	TKO
(England) Oli Thompson	Rd 1

=== Genome-1: Osaka ===
- This tournament took place entirely on the Genome33 event.

Semifinals
Naoya Ogawa	Win
Minowaman
Atsushi Sawada	Win
Montanha Silva

Final
Atsushi Sawada	Win
Minowaman

=== Genome-1: Nagoya ===
- This tournament took place entirely on the Genome34 event.

Semifinals
Hideki Suzuki	Win
Wang Bin
Daichi Hashimoto	Win
Raj Singh

Final
Hideki Suzuki	Win
Daichi Hashimoto

=== Lucha Libre World Cup 2017 ===
- This tournament took place entirely on night 2 of the Lucha Libre World Cup 2017 event and was co-promoted with Lucha Libre AAA Worldwide and Lucha Underground.

Quarterfinals
Team Mexico AAA (Pagano and Psycho Clown)	Pin
(United States) Team USA Noah (Cody Hall and Quiet Storm)
Team Japan IGF (Kendo Kashin and Nosawa)	DQ
Team Rest of the World (Mil Muertes and Vampiro)
Team Noah Japan (Hi69 and Taiji Ishimori)	Pin
(United States) Team USA Lucha Underground (Marty Martinez and Son of Havoc)
(United States) Team USA Impact (Andrew Everett and DJZ)	Pin
Team Mexico Lucha Underground (Aero Star and Drago)

Semifinals
Team Mexico AAA (Pagano and Psycho Clown)	Pin
Team Japan IGF (Kendo Kashin and Nosawa)
Team Noah Japan (Hi69 and Taiji Ishimori)	Pin
(United States) Team USA Impact (Andrew Everett and DJZ)

Final
Team Mexico AAA (Pagano and Psycho Clown)	Pin
Team Noah Japan (Hi69 and Taiji Ishimori)

== IGF events ==
Event title	Date	Venue	Location	Main event
Toukon Bom-Ba-Ye	June 29, 2007	Ryogoku Kokugikan	Tokyo, Japan	Brock Lesnar (c) vs. Kurt Angle for the IWGP Heavyweight Championship
Genome 1	September 8, 2007	NGK Insulators Hall	Nagoya, Aichi, Japan	Josh Barnett vs. Don Frye
Genome 2 〜 Inoki Fighting Xmas	December 20, 2007	Ariake Coliseum	Tokyo, Japan	Naoya Ogawa vs. Tadao Yasuda
Genome3 〜 Inoki Memorial 65	February 16, 2008	Ariake Coliseum	Tokyo, Japan	Naoya Ogawa vs. Josh Barnett
Genome4	April 12, 2008	Osaka Prefectural Gymnasium	Osaka, Japan	Naoya Ogawa vs. Tomko
Genome5 〜 Hokkaido Genki Summit	June 23, 2008	Tsukisamu Dome	Sapporo, Hokkaido, Japan	Montanha Silva vs. Naoya Ogawa
Inoki Genki Festival in Hakodate 〜 Hakodate Tomodachi Bom-Ba-Ye	June 25, 2008	Hakodate Arena	Hakodate, Hokkaido, Japan	Naoya Ogawa and Atsushi Sawada vs. Necro Butcher and The Predator
Genome6	August 15, 2008	Ryogoku Kokugikan	Tokyo, Japan	Josh Barnett vs. Tank Abbott
Genome7	November 24, 2008	Aichi Prefectural Gymnasium	Nagoya, Aichi, Japan	Josh Barnett vs. Jon Andersen
Genome8	March 15, 2009	Hiroshima Sun Plaza	Hiroshima, Japan	Naoya Ogawa and The Predator vs. Yoshihiro Takayama and Montanha Silva
Genome9	August 9, 2009	Ariake Coliseum	Tokyo, Japan	Naoya Ogawa and Josh Barnett vs. Yoshihiro Takayama and Bob Sapp
Genome10	November 3, 2009	JCB Hall	Tokyo, Japan	Naoya Ogawa vs. Yoshihiro Takayama
Genome11	February 22, 2010	JCB Hall	Tokyo, Japan	Kensuke Sasaki and Katsuhiko Nakajima vs. Naoya Ogawa and Atsushi Sawada
Genome12	May 9, 2010	Osaka Prefectural Gymnasium	Osaka, Japan	Minoru Suzuki and Naomichi Marufuji vs. Naoya Ogawa and Atsushi Sawada
Genome13	September 25, 2010	JCB Hall	Tokyo, Japan	Josh Barnett vs. Tim Sylvia
Inoki Bom-Ba-Ye 2010	December 3, 2010	Ryogoku Kokugikan	Tokyo, Japan	Shinichi Suzukawa vs. Montanha Silva
Genome14	February 5, 2011	Fukuoka Kokusai Center	Fukuoka, Japan	Shinichi Suzukawa vs. Bob Sapp
Genome15	April 28, 2011	Tokyo Dome City Hall	Tokyo, Japan	Jérôme Le Banner vs. Shinichi Suzukawa
Genome16	July 10, 2011	Tokyo Dome City Hall	Tokyo, Japan	Jérôme Le Banner vs. Erik Hammer
Inoki Genome 〜 Super Stars Festival 2011	August 27, 2011	Ryogoku Kokugikan	Tokyo, Japan	Jérôme Le Banner (c) vs. Kazuyuki Fujita for the IGF Championship
Genome17	September 3, 2011	Aichi Prefectural Gymnasium	Nagoya, Aichi, Japan	Jérôme Le Banner (c) vs. Montanha Silva for the IGF Championship
Inoki Bom-Ba-Ye 2011	December 2, 2011	Ryogoku Kokugikan	Tokyo, Japan	Jérôme Le Banner (c) vs. Josh Barnett for the IGF Championship
Fighting Spirit Festival in Iwaki	December 4, 2011	Iwaki Meisei University	Iwaki, Fukushima, Japan	Atsushi Sawada and Hideki Suzuki vs. Shinichi Suzukawa and Montanha Silva
Fight For Japan: Genki Desu Ka Omisoka 2011	December 31, 2011	Saitama Super Arena	Saitama, Japan	Fedor Emelianenko vs. Satoshi Ishii
Genome18	February 17, 2012	Tokyo Dome City Hall	Tokyo, Japan	Jérôme Le Banner (c) vs. Peter Aerts for the IGF Championship
Genome19	March 20, 2012	Fukuoka Kokusai Center	Fukuoka, Japan	Peter Aerts and Minowaman vs. Shinichi Suzukawa and Atsushi Sawada
Genome20	May 26, 2012	Tokyo Dome City Hall	Tokyo, Japan	Jérôme Le Banner (c) vs. Alexander Kozlov for the IGF Championship
KF-1 World Martial Arts Tournament	July 10, 2012	Shanghai Oriental Sports Center	Shanghai, China	Jérôme Le Banner (c) vs. Alexander Kozlov for the IGF Championship
Genome21	July 14, 2012	Bodymaker Colosseum	Osaka, Japan	Jérôme Le Banner (c) vs. Kazuyuki Fujita for the IGF Championship
Genome22	September 29, 2012	Aichi Prefectural Gymnasium	Nagoya, Aichi, Japan	Kazuyuki Fujita (c) vs. Bobby Lashley for the IGF Championship
Genome23	October 16, 2012	Tokyo Dome City Hall	Tokyo, Japan	Kazuyuki Fujita vs. Atsushi Sawada
Inoki Bom-Ba-Ye World Series in Pakistan	December 2, 2012	Lahore National Hockey Stadium	Lahore, Pakistan	Kazuyuki Fujita vs. Hideki Suzuki
Inoki Bom-Ba-Ye World Series in Pakistan	December 5, 2012	Arbab Niaz Stadium	Peshawar, Pakistan	Kazuyuki Fujita vs. Shogun Okamoto
Inoki Bom-Ba-Ye 2012	December 31, 2012	Ryogoku Kokugikan	Tokyo, Japan	Kazuyuki Fujita vs. Naoya Ogawa
Genome24	February 23, 2013	Tokyo Dome City Hall	Tokyo, Japan	Naoya Ogawa vs. Atsushi Sawada
Genome25	March 20, 2013	Fukuoka Kokusai Center	Fukuoka, Japan	Kazuyuki Fujita (c) vs. Erik Hammer for the IGF Championship
Genome26	May 26, 2013	Tokyo Dome City Hall	Tokyo, Japan	Kazuyuki Fujita and Bobby Lashley vs. Naoya Ogawa and Shinichi Suzukawa
Genome27	July 20, 2013	Bodymaker Colosseum	Osaka, Japan	Kazuyuki Fujita, Bobby Lashley, Shinichi Suzukawa, Bob Sapp, and Atsushi Sawada vs. Shogun Okamoto, Hiromi Amada, Peter Aerts, Naoya Ogawa, and Hideki Suzuki
Shangai Dojo Opening Anniversary Special Event	July 24, 2013	Shanghai Dojo	Shanghai, China	Peter Aerts vs. Hideki Suzuki
Fields New Model Exhibition	September 11, 2013	Prince Park Tower	Tokyo, Japan	Kazuyuki Fujita vs. Shogun Okamoto
Genome28	September 28, 2013	Aichi Prefectural Gymnasium	Nagoya, Aichi, Japan	Kazuyuki Fujita (c) vs. Atsushi Sawada for the IGF Championship
Genome29	October 26, 2013	Tokyo Dome City Hall	Tokyo, Japan	Kazuyuki Fujita (c) vs. Hideki Suzuki for the IGF Championship
Inoki Bom-Ba-Ye 2013	December 31, 2013	Ryogoku Kokugikan	Tokyo, Japan	Kazuyuki Fujita (c) vs. Satoshi Ishii for the IGF Championship
Pakistan–Japan Friendship Festival	April 27, 2014	Ueno Park	Tokyo, Japan	Kazuyuki Fujita vs. Shogun Okamoto
Inoki Genome Fight 1	May 5, 2014	Ryogoku Kokugikan	Tokyo, Japan	Satoshi Ishii (c) vs. Philip De Fries for the IGF Championship
Genome30	July 13, 2014	Fukuoka Kokusai Center	Fukuoka, Japan	Naoya Ogawa and Minowaman vs. Hiromi Amada and Jérôme Le Banner
Tohoku Earthquake Restoration Charity Event – Genki Festival 2014	July 20, 2014		Iwaki, Fukushima, Japan	
Tohoku Earthquake Restoration Charity Event – Genki Festival 2014	July 21, 2014		Sōma, Fukushima, Japan	
Tohoku Earthquake Restoration Charity Event – Genki Festival 2014	July 22, 2014		Iwanuma, Miyagi, Japan	
Tohoku Earthquake Restoration Charity Event – Genki Festival 2014	July 23, 2014		Ishinomaki, Miyagi, Japan	
Tohoku Earthquake Restoration Charity Event – Genki Festival 2014	July 24, 2014		Kesennuma, Miyagi, Japan	
Tohoku Earthquake Restoration Charity Event – Genki Festival 2014	July 25, 2014		Ōfunato, Iwate, Japan	
Tohoku Earthquake Restoration Charity Event – Genki Festival 2014	July 26, 2014		Miyako, Iwate, Japan	
Tohoku Earthquake Restoration Charity Event – Genki Festival 2014	July 27, 2014		Aomori, Japan	
Inoki Genome Fight 2	August 23, 2014	Ryogoku Kokugikan	Tokyo, Japan	Satoshi Ishii (c) vs. Mirko Cro Cop for the IGF Championship
International Pro-Wrestling Festival in Pyongyang	August 30, 2014	Pyongyang Arena	Pyongyang, North Korea	Kazuyuki Fujita vs. Erik Hammer
International Pro-Wrestling Festival in Pyongyang	August 31, 2014	Pyongyang Arena	Pyongyang, North Korea	
Genome31	October 13, 2014	Aichi Prefectural Gymnasium	Nagoya, Aichi, Japan	Jérôme Le Banner and Naoya Ogawa vs. Erik Hammer and Kazuyuki Fujita
Road to Inoki Bom-Ba-Ye 2014 Fan Festival	December 1, 2014	Korakuen Hall	Tokyo, Japan	Daichi Hashimoto vs. Shinya Aoki
Inoki Bom-Ba-Ye 2014	December 31, 2014	Ryogoku Kokugikan	Tokyo, Japan	Mirko Cro Cop (c) vs. Satoshi Ishii for the IGF Championship
Genome32	February 20, 2015	Tokyo Dome City Hall	Tokyo, Japan	Naoya Ogawa and Wang Bin vs. Minowaman and Atsushi Sawada
Inoki Genome Fight 3	April 11, 2015	Ryogoku Kokugikan	Tokyo, Japan	Oli Thompson vs. Minowaman
Genome33	May 5, 2015	Osaka Prefectural Gymnasium	Osaka, Japan	Atsushi Sawada vs. Minowaman
Genome34	June 27, 2015	Aichi Prefectural Gymnasium	Nagoya, Aichi, Japan	Hideki Suzuki vs. Daichi Hashimoto
Inoki Genome Fight 4	August 29, 2015	Ryogoku Kokugikan	Tokyo, Japan	Oli Thompson vs. Chris Barnett
Ja Matsuri 2015	October 31, 2015		Minamisōma, Fukushima, Japan	
Ja Matsuri 2015	November 1, 2015		Minamisōma, Fukushima, Japan	
Inoki Bom-Ba-Ye 2015	December 31, 2015	Ryogoku Kokugikan	Tokyo, Japan	Oli Thompson vs. Fernando Rodrigues Jr. for the vacant IGF Championship
Genome35	February 26, 2016	Tokyo Dome City Hall	Tokyo, Japan	Naoya Ogawa vs. Shinya Aoki
Genome36	May 29, 2016	EDION Arena Osaka	Osaka, Japan	Shinichi Suzukawa and Shinya Aoki vs. Ryoji Sai and Rikiya Fudo
Shanghai Dojo Opening Commemoration Convention	August 8, 2016	Shanghai Dojo	Shanghai, China	Kenso and Minoru Tanaka vs. Alexander Otsuka and Keisuke Okuda
Inoki–Ali 40th Anniversary	September 3, 2016		Tokyo, Japan	Masakatsu Funaki and Shinichi Suzukawa vs. Shinya Aoki and Alexander Otsuka
NEW Opening Series	April 5, 2017	Korakuen Hall	Tokyo, Japan	Josh Barnett vs. Shinichi Suzukawa
Shanghai Launching Business Convention	April 8, 2017		Shanghai, China	Kenso and Lin Dong Xuan vs. Alexander Otsuka and Chang Jian Feng
NEW Opening Series	April 20, 2017	Shinjuku FACE	Tokyo, Japan	Shinichi Suzukawa and Masakatsu Funaki vs. Alexander Otsuka and Ryuji Hijikata
NEW Opening Series	April 30, 2017	Fuerai Cube Kasukabe	Kasukabe, Saitama, Japan	Shinichi Suzukawa and Masakatsu Funaki vs. Alexander Otsuka and Ryuji Hijikata
NEW Opening Series	May 12, 2017	Tochigi Prefectural Cultural Center	Utsunomiya, Tochigi, Japan	Shinichi Suzukawa vs. Super Tiger
NEW Opening Series	May 21, 2017		Chiba, Japan	Shinichi Suzukawa vs. Super Tiger
NEW Opening Series: Nasu Festival 2017	May 27, 2017	Nasu Highland Park	Nasu, Tochigi, Japan	Shinichi Suzukawa vs. Super Tiger
NEW 2nd Series	June 2, 2017		Tokyo, Japan	Kazunari Murakami and Kohei Sato vs. Shinichi Suzukawa and Keisuke Okuda
NEW 2nd Series	June 8, 2017		Matsumoto, Nagano, Japan	Shinichi Suzukawa and Keisuke Okuda vs. Kohei Sato and Black Tiger
NEW 2nd Series	June 17, 2017		Osaka, Japan	Shiro Fukumen #1 and Shiro Fukumen #2 vs. Shinichi Suzukawa and Keisuke Okuda
NEW 2nd Series	June 18, 2017		Himeji, Hyōgo, Japan	Shinichi Suzukawa and Keisuke Okuda vs. Shiro Fukumen #1 and Shiro Fukumen #3
NEW 2nd Series	July 7, 2017		Tokyo, Japan	Kazunari Murakami and Kohei Sato vs. Keisuke Okuda and Akira Jo
NEW 2nd Series	July 15, 2017		Okazaki, Aichi, Japan	Kazunari Murakami and Shiro Fukumen #4 vs. Keisuke Okuda and Akira Jo
NEW 2nd Series	July 16, 2017		Tsu, Mie, Japan	Kazunari Murakami and Shiro Fukumen #4 vs. Keisuke Okuda and Akira Jo
NEW 2nd Series	August 25, 2017		Tokyo, Japan	
Lucha Libre World Cup 2017	October 9, 2017	Shin-Kiba 1st Ring	Tokyo, Japan	Mil Muertes vs. Vampiro
Lucha Libre World Cup 2017	October 10, 2017	Korakuen Hall	Tokyo, Japan	Pagano and Psycho Clown vs. Hi69 and Taiji Ishimori
Japan & China Diplomatic Relations 45th Anniversary	November 16, 2017	Korakuen Hall	Tokyo, Japan	Kazuyuki Fujita and Kendo Kashin vs. Masakatsu Funaki and Wang Fei
New Pro-Wrestling Toho Eiyu-den	December 17, 2017		Shenzhen, China	
New Pro-Wrestling Toho Eiyu-den	December 18, 2017		Shenzhen, China	
New Pro-Wrestling Toho Eiyu-den	December 21, 2017		Zhuhai, China	
Toho Eiyu-den Tokyo Conference	March 20, 2018	Korakuen Hall	Tokyo, Japan	Chang Jian Feng and Xuan Lin Dong vs. Akira Jo and Keisuke Okuda
New Pro-Wrestling Toho Eiyu-den Beijing Conference	April 21, 2018		Beijing, China	
Dotonbori Pro x Toho Eiyu-den	May 27, 2018	EDION Arena Osaka	Osaka, Japan	Toru (c) vs. Rapid for the WDW Championship
New Pro-Wrestling Toho Eiyu-den Shanghai Conference	August 8, 2018		Shanghai, China	
New Pro-Wrestling Toho Eiyu-den Shanghai Conference	August 9, 2018		Shanghai, China	
Dotonbori Pro x Toho Eiyu-den 2 〜 Naniwa Eiyuden	October 28, 2018	EDION Arena Osaka	Osaka, Japan	Billy Ken Kid, Jiang Ma Zhu, and Hasegawa vs. Kuuga, Chang Jian Feng, and Lin Dong Xuan
Toho Eiyu-den Tianjin Conference	December 2, 2018		Tianjin, China	

== See also ==
- Professional wrestling in Japan
- List of professional wrestling promotions in Japan
- List of National Wrestling Alliance territories
