= IWGP Heavyweight Championship (original version) =

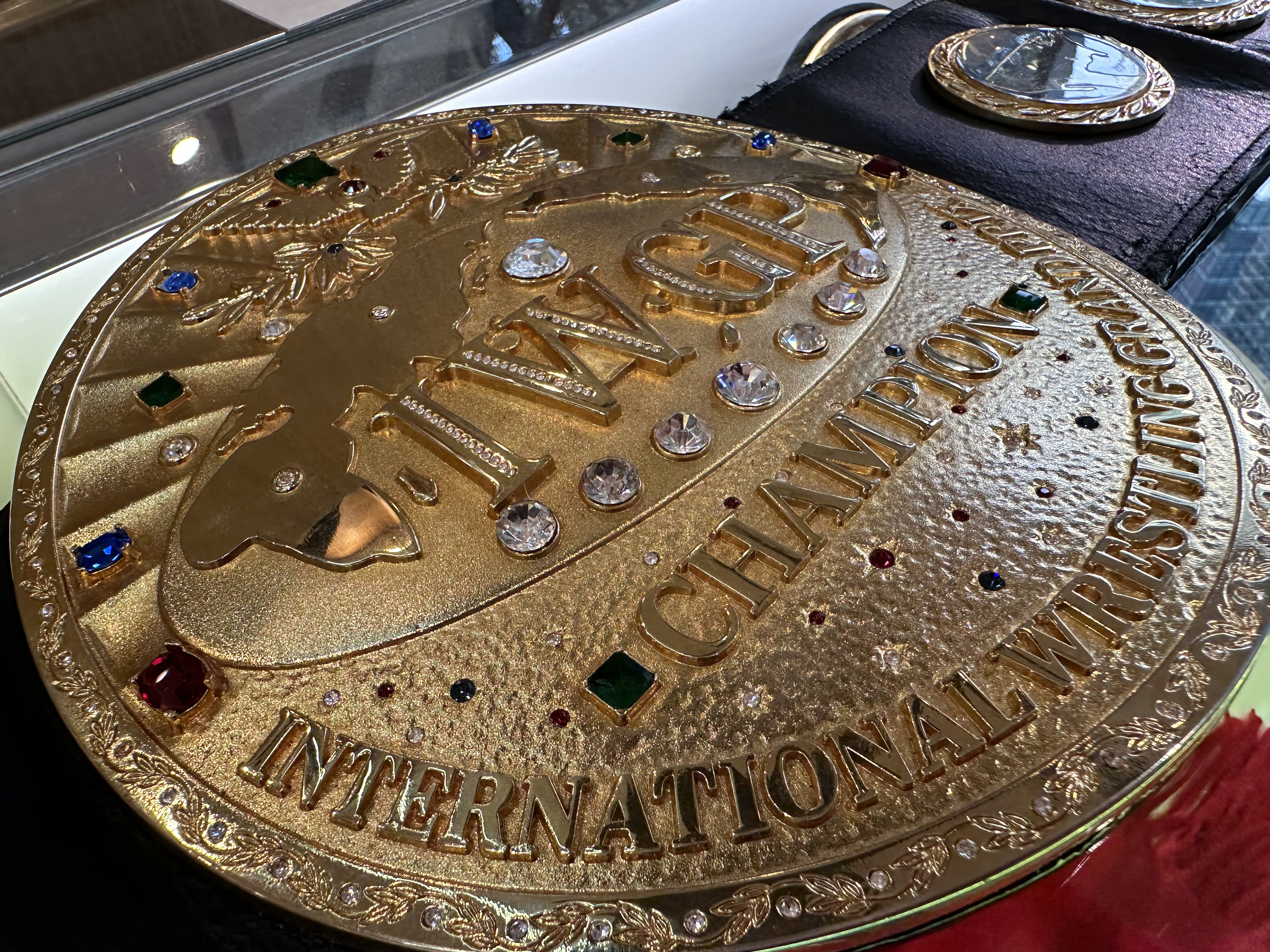

Details
- Promotion: New Japan Pro-Wrestling (NJPW)
- Date established: June 2, 1983
- Date retired: May 11, 1987

Other name
- IWGP Championship
Statistics
- First champion: Hulk Hogan
- Final champion: Antonio Inoki
- Most reigns: Antonio Inoki (2 reigns)
- Longest reign: Antonio Inoki (701 days)
- Shortest reign: Antonio Inoki (326 days)
- Oldest champion: Antonio Inoki (43 years, 3 months)
- Youngest champion: Hulk Hogan (29 years, 9 months)

The original version of IWGP Heavyweight Championship (IWGPヘビー級王座, IWGP hebī-kyū ōza) was a professional wrestling world heavyweight championship owned by the New Japan Pro-Wrestling (NJPW) professional wrestling promotion. "IWGP" is the initialism of NJPW's governing body, the International Wrestling Grand Prix.

The title was introduced in 1983 for the winner of the IWGP League 1983. Subsequently, the championship was defended annually against the winner of the IWGP League of the year. The 1987–2021 IWGP Heavyweight Championship debuted in 1987 (replacing this version) and was defended regularly; the original IWGP belt was kept in use until 1997.

== History ==
The inaugural champion was determined in the 1983 edition of the IWGP League, a 10-man round-robin tournament. Wrestlers from several promotions worldwide participated. Participants included World Heavyweight Champions from other international promotions (such as Canek, at the time UWA World Heavyweight Champion or Otto Wanz, at the time CWA World Heavyweight Champion).

Hulk Hogan won the tournament, after beating Antonio Inoki via knockout. As a result, Hogan became the first IWGP Heavyweight Champion in this format.

After that, the championship was defended annually against the winner of the IWGP League of The Year.

Antonio Inoki won the title in 1984. Inoki successfully defended it in 1985 against André The Giant (IWGP League winner of 1985) and Hulk Hogan. Hogan was the only challenger that didn't win the tournament to challenge for the championship.

In 1986, Inoki vacated the title, because he wanted to compete in the IWGP League. Therefore, the 1986 edition was the first to crown a new Champion since the 1983 edition. Inoki won the 1986 League, and became champion for the second time.

In 1987, the title was deactivated and replaced by a new version of IWGP Heavyweight Championship (active between 1987 and 2021), which was awarded to the winner of the IWGP League 1987. The new championship was defended regularly, rather than as part of a tournament. Its lineage does not acknowledge the champions of the original title.

== Reigns ==
Over the championship's three-year history, there were only three reigns between two champions. Hulk Hogan was the inaugural champion, with Antonio Inoki being the last, and a record two-time champion. Inoki's first reign was the longest at 701 days, while his second being the shortest at 326 days. Inoki was the oldest champion at 43 years old, while Hogan the youngest at 29 years old.

Key
No.	Overall reign number
Reign	Reign number for the specific champion
Days	Number of days held
Defenses	Number of successful defenses
+	Current reign is changing daily

No.	Champion	Championship change			Reign statistics			Notes	Ref.
No.	Champion	Date	Event	Location	Reign	Days	Defenses	Notes	Ref.
New Japan Pro Wrestling (NJPW)
1	Hulk Hogan	June 2, 1983	IWGP League 1983	Tokyo, Japan	1	378	0	Hogan defeated Antonio Inoki via knockout in the IWGP League 1983 final, becoming the first champion.	
2	Antonio Inoki	June 14, 1984	IWGP League 1984	Tokyo, Japan	1	701	2	This title change was via countout	
—	Vacated	May 16, 1986	—	—	—	—	—	Inoki gives up the championship, because he wanted compete in the IWGP League again.	
3	Antonio Inoki	June 19, 1986	IWGP League 1986	Tokyo, Japan	2	326	0	Inoki defeated Dick Murdoch in the IWGP League 1986 final.	
—	Deactivated	May 11, 1987	—	—	—	—	—	The championship was deactivated and replaced by the IWGP Heavyweight Championship, that was awarded to the winner of the IWGP League 1987.	

== Combined reigns ==
Rank	Champion	No. of reigns	Combined defenses	Combined days
1	Antonio Inoki	2	2	1,027
2	Hulk Hogan	1	0	378

Sporting positions
Preceded by NWF Heavyweight Championship	New Japan Pro-Wrestling's top heavyweight championship 1983–1987	Succeeded by IWGP Heavyweight Championship
