= Your Party =

Your Party may refer to:

== Politics ==
- Your Party (Japan), 2009–2014
- Your Party (UK), established in 2025
- Your Party (UK, 2004), 2004–2006
- Your Political Party of British Columbia, Canada, 2002–2024

== Other uses ==
- "Your Party", a 2007 song on Ween's La Cucaracha album

== See also ==
- Your Movement
