= Antonio Inoki =

Japanese wrestler and politician (1943–2022)

Antonio Inoki Junior Fourth Rank
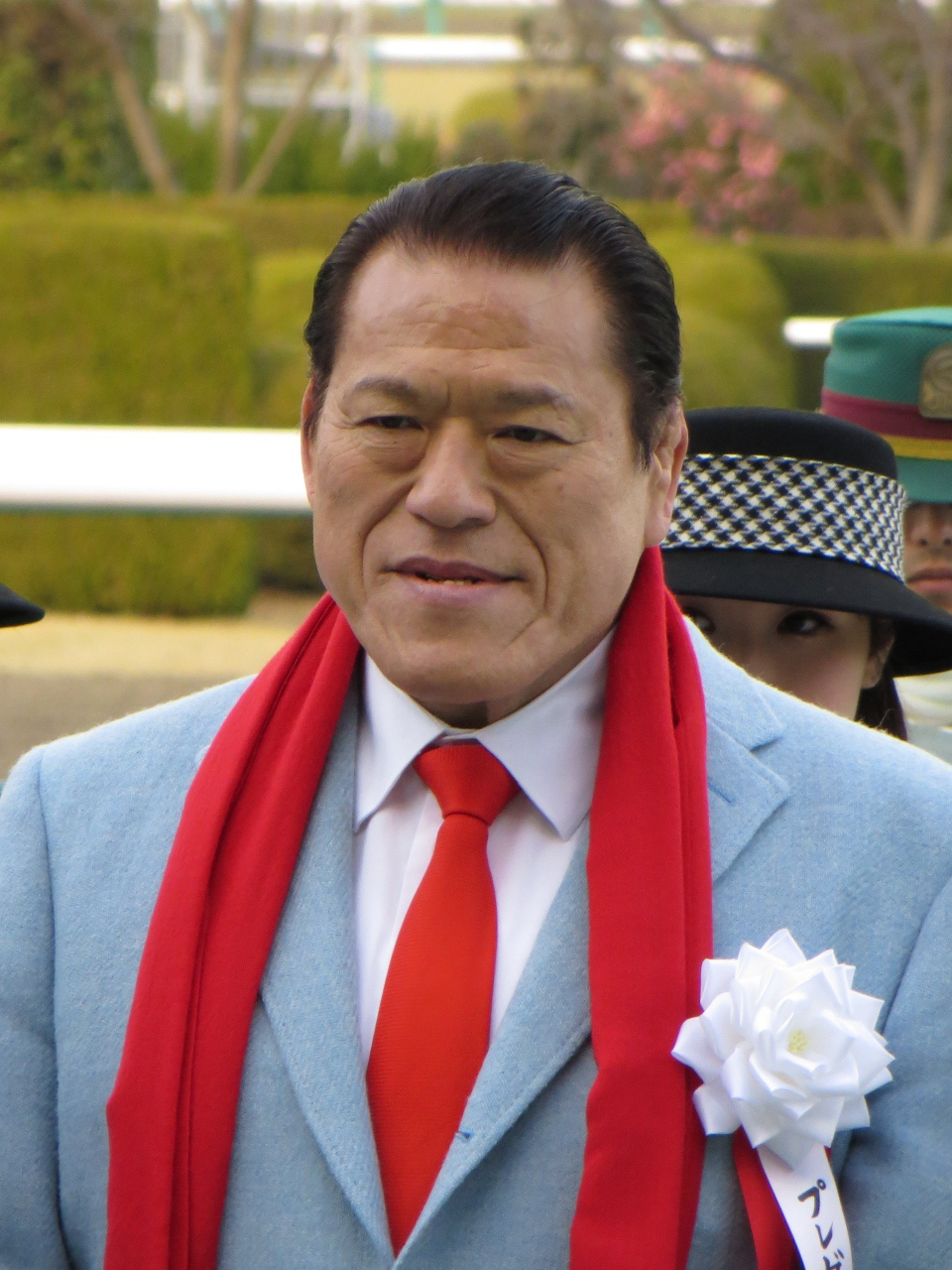
- Inoki, circa 2012

Member of the House of Councillors
- In office 29 July 2013 – 28 July 2019
- Constituency: National PR
- In office 23 July 1989 – 22 July 1995
- Constituency: National PR

Personal details
- Born: Kanji Inoki (猪木寛至, Inoki Kanji); 20 February 1943 Tsurumi, Yokohama, Japan
- Died: 1 October 2022 (aged 79) Minato, Tokyo, Japan
- Party: DPP (2019)
- Other political affiliations: Sports and Peace (1989–1995); JRP (2013–2014); PFG (2014–2015); Assembly to Energize Japan (2015–2016); Independents Club (2016–2019)
- Spouse(s): Diana Tuck (separated after 1965) Mitsuko Baisho (m. 1971; div. 1987) A third wife (m. 1989; div. 2012) Tazuko Tada (m. 2017; died 2019)
- Children: 3
- Relatives: Juichi Sagara (brother); Pablo Inoki (brother); Simon Inoki (son-in-law); Hirota Inoki (grandson); Naoto Inoki (grandson)
- Professional wrestling career
- Ring name(s): Antonio Inoki; The Kamikaze; Kanji Inoki; Kazimoto; Killer Inoki; Kinji Onoki; Little Tokyo; Moeru Toukon; Tokyo Tom
- Billed height: 6 ft 3 in (1.91 m)
- Billed weight: 224 lb (102 kg)
- Billed from: Tokyo, Japan
- Trained by: Rikidōzan; Karl Gotch
- Debut: 30 September 1960
- Retired: 4 April 1998

Antonio Inoki (アントニオ猪木; born Kanji Inoki (Japanese: 猪木寛至, Hepburn: Inoki Kanji); 20 February 1943 – 1 October 2022) was a Japanese professional wrestler, professional wrestling trainer, martial artist, politician, and promoter of professional wrestling and mixed martial arts (MMA). He is best known as the founder and 33-year owner of New Japan Pro-Wrestling (NJPW). He is considered to be one of the most influential professional wrestlers of all time, and one of the biggest key influences on MMA in Japan and internationally.

After spending his adolescence in Brazil, Inoki began his professional wrestling career in the 1960s for the Japan Pro Wrestling Alliance (JWA) under the tutelage of Rikidōzan. After he changed his in-ring moniker to Antonio Inoki in 1963, an homage to accomplished Italian wrestler Antonino Rocca, Inoki became one of the most popular stars in Japanese professional wrestling. He is credited with developing strong style and shoot style wrestling in the 1970s and 1980s. He parlayed his wrestling career into becoming one of Japan's most recognizable athletes, a reputation bolstered by his 1976 fight against world champion boxer Muhammad Ali — a fight that served as a predecessor to modern day MMA. In 1995 Inoki headlined two shows with Ric Flair in North Korea that drew 165,000 and 190,000 spectators, the highest attendances in professional wrestling history. Inoki wrestled his retirement match on 4 April 1998 against Don Frye, and was inducted into the WWE Hall of Fame in 2010. Inoki was a twelve-time professional wrestling world champion, notably being the inaugural IWGP Heavyweight Champion and the first Asian WWF Heavyweight Champion, a reign not officially recognized by WWE.

Inoki began his promoting career in 1972, when he founded New Japan Pro-Wrestling. He remained the owner of NJPW until 2005 when he sold his controlling share in the promotion to the Yuke's video game company. In 2007, he founded the Inoki Genome Federation (IGF). In 2017, Inoki founded ISM and the following year left IGF. He was also a co-creator of the karate style Kansui-ryū (寛水流, Kansui-ryū) along with Matsubayashi-ryū master Yukio Mizutani.

In 1989, while still an active wrestler, Inoki entered politics as he was elected to the Japanese House of Councillors. During his first term with the House of Councillors, Inoki successfully negotiated with Saddam Hussein for the release of Japanese hostages in Iraq before the outbreak of the Gulf War. While in Iraq, Inoki converted to Shia Islam and adopted the Islamic moniker Muhammad Hussain Inoki (Arabic: محمد حسين اينوكي, romanized: Muhamad Husayn Aynwky). His first tenure in the House of Councillors ended in 1995, but he was reelected in 2013. In 2019, Inoki retired from politics.

== Early life, family and education ==
Kanji Inoki was born into an affluent family in Yokohama on 20 February 1943. Of the 11 siblings (seven boys and four girls), he was second-youngest and the sixth son. Their father Sajiro Inoki was a politician and businessman who worked in the coal industry. Sajiro died when Kanji was five years old.

Inoki was taught karate by an older brother while in 6th grade. By the time he was in 7th grade at Terao Junior High School, he was 5 ft 11 in (1.80 m) tall. He joined the basketball team but switched to track and field as a shot putter. He eventually won the championship at the Yokohama Junior High School track and field competition.

The family suffered financial difficulties in the post-World War II years. At age 14, Inoki migrated to Brazil with his grandfather, mother, and brothers. His grandfather died during the journey to Brazil. Upon their arrival, the family began to work 12 hour shifts daily on a coffee plantation in São Paulo. Later on, Inoki won regional championships in Brazil in shot put, discus, and javelin and won the All Brazilian championships in shot put and discus.

Inoki's brother Juichi Sagara was a karate master and is credited as one of the people responsible for bringing Shotokan to Brazil. Inoki's brother Pablo Inoki, a tenor and political activist, once led the Inoki-founded Sports and Peace Party.

== Professional wrestling career ==
=== Early career (1960–1971) ===
Inoki met Rikidōzan at the age of 17 in Brazil and went back to Japan for the Japan Pro Wrestling Alliance (JWA) as his disciple. He trained in the JWA dojo under the renowned Karl Gotch, complementing further his training under amateur wrestler Isao Yoshiwara and kosen judoka Kiyotaka Otsubo. One of his dojo classmates was Giant Baba. After Rikidozan's murder, Inoki worked in Baba's shadow until he left for an excursion to the United States in 1964.

After a long excursion of wrestling in the United States, Inoki found a new home in Tokyo Pro Wrestling in 1966. While there, Inoki became their biggest star. His first major feud in Japan was against Johnny Valentine, NWA United States Champion in Toronto. Inoki defeated Valentine on 19 December 1966 in Osaka to claim a version of the title. The company folded in January 1967, due to turmoil behind the scenes, and Inoki abandoned the title.

Returning to JWA in late 1967, Inoki was made Baba's partner and the two dominated the tag team ranks as the "B-I Cannon", winning the NWA International Tag Team Championship belts four times.

On 16 May 1969, during the 11th World Big League, Inoki stopped Giant Baba's fourth consecutive victory and won his first tournament.

In July 1969, when NET (currently TV Asahi) started broadcasting Japanese professional wrestling, Inoki was the ace of NET's wrestling broadcasts, as Baba's matches were monopolized by Nippon TV under the agreement between the JWA and Nippon TV. On 2 December 1969, he challenged Dory Funk Jr. for the NWA World Heavyweight Championship, and on 26 March 1971, won the NWA United National Championship from John Tolos, establishing the title in Japan.

=== New Japan Pro-Wrestling (1972–2005) ===
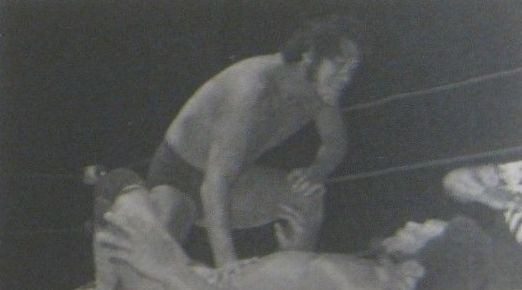
Antonio Inoki wrestling with Ernie Ladd in June 1975

Fired from JWA in late 1971 for planning a takeover of the promotion, Inoki founded New Japan Pro-Wrestling (NJPW) in 1972. His first match as a New Japan wrestler was against Karl Gotch. In 1975 he faced Lou Thesz, with Inoki taking a vicious Greco-Roman backdrop within the first seconds of the match.

In 1976, Inoki fought with Pakistani Akram Pahalwan in a special rules match. The match apparently turned into a shoot, with an uncooperative Akram biting Inoki in the arm and Inoki retaliating with an eye poke. At the end, Inoki won the bout with a double wrist lock, injuring Pahalwan's arm after the latter refused to submit. According to referee Mr. Takahashi, this finish was not scripted and was fought for real after the match's original flow became undone.

On 8 December 1977, Inoki was involved in a match against former strongman turned professional wrestler Antonio Barichievich better known as The Great Antonio. Barichievich inexplicably began no-selling Inoki's attacks and then stiffing Inoki; Inoki responded by shooting on Barichievich, retaliating with a series palm strikes, grounding him with a single leg takedown and following with up repeated kicks, and then stomping his head repeatedly as he lay on the mat before the match was stopped.

In June 1979, Inoki wrestled Akram's countryman Zubair Jhara Pahalwan, this time in a regular match, and lost the fight in the fifth round. In 2014, 22 years after Zubair Jhara's death, he announced he would take Jhara's nephew Haroon Abid under his guardianship.

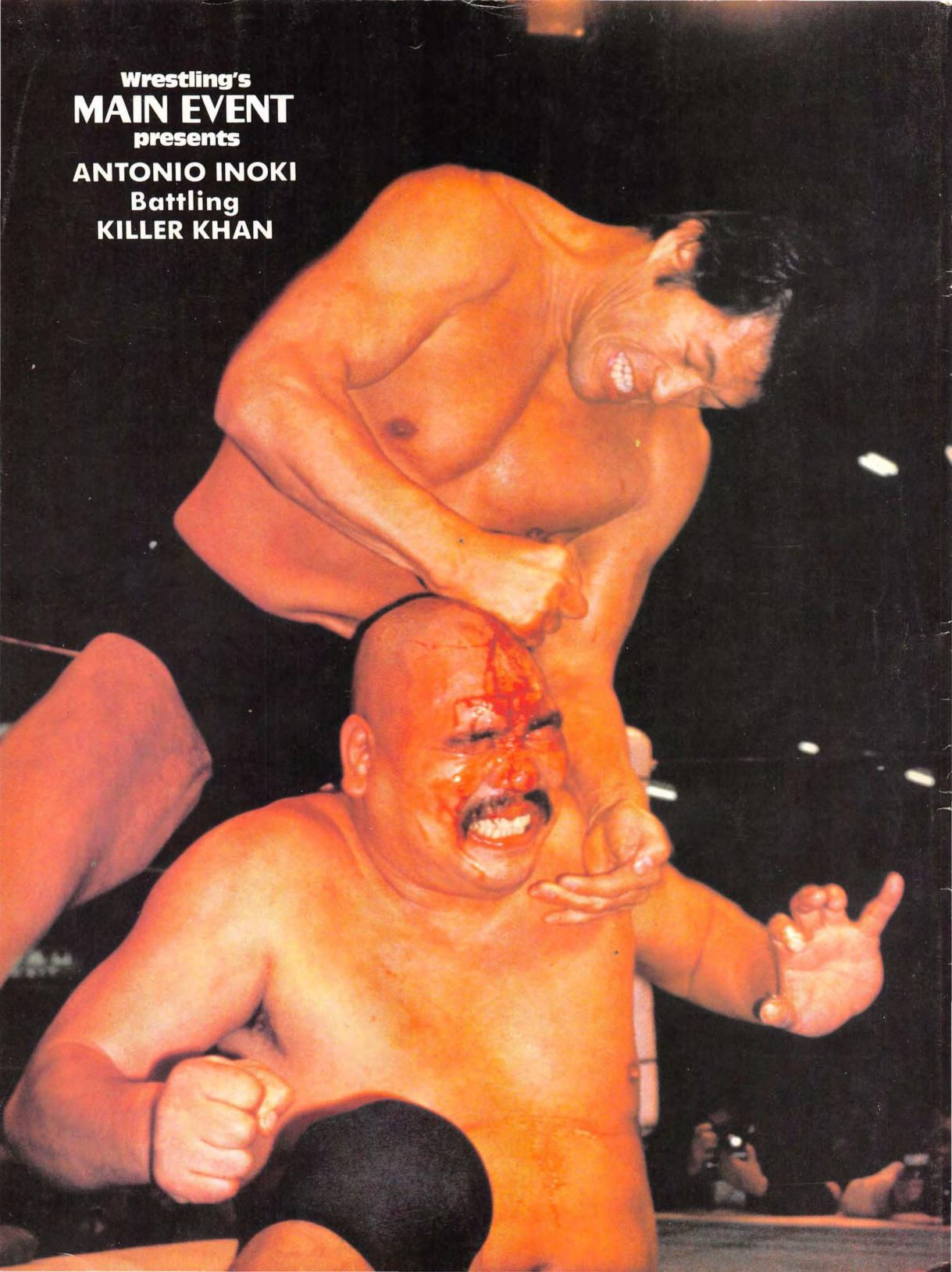
Inoki (top) pounding Killer Khan's (bottom) head during a match in 1982

On 30 November 1979, Inoki defeated WWF Heavyweight Champion Bob Backlund in Tokushima, Japan, to win the championship. Backlund then won a rematch on 6 December. However, WWF president Hisashi Shinma declared the re-match a no contest due to interference from Tiger Jeet Singh, and Inoki remained champion. Inoki refused the title on the same day, and it was declared vacant. Backlund later defeated Bobby Duncum in a Texas Death match to regain the title on 12 December. Inoki's reign is not recognized by WWE in its WWF/WWE title history and Backlund's first reign is viewed as uninterrupted from 1978 to 1983.

In 1995, Inoki and the North Korean government came together to hold a two-day wrestling festival for peace in Pyongyang, North Korea. The event drew 165,000 and 190,000 fans respectively to Rungnado May Day Stadium. The main event saw the only match between Inoki and Ric Flair, with Inoki coming out on top. Days before this event, Inoki and the Korean press went to the grave and birthplace of Rikidōzan and paid tribute to him.

Inoki's retirement from professional wrestling matches came with the staging of the "Final Countdown" series between 1994 and 1998. This was a special series in which Inoki re-lived some of his martial arts matches under traditional professional wrestling rules, as well as rematches of some of his most well known wrestling matches. As part of the Final Countdown tour, Inoki made a rare World Championship Wrestling appearance; defeating WCW World Television Champion Steven Regal in a non-title match at Clash of the Champions XXVIII. On 4 April 1998, Inoki defeated Don Frye in the final official match of his professional wrestling career. After his retirement in 1998, Inoki founded a new wrestling promotion, the Universal Fighting-Arts Organization (UFO).

Inoki would later participate in four exhibition matches after his retirement. On 11 March 2000, at a Rikidōzan memorial event, Inoki was defeated by Japanese actor and singer Hideaki Takizawa; later that year during a New Year's Eve event, he wrestled Brazilian mixed martial artist Renzo Gracie to a time limit draw. On 31 December 2001, he teamed with The Great Sasuke to defeat Giant Silva and Red & White Mask; two years later, on 31 December 2003, Inoki wrestled the final match of his career, facing Tatsumi Fujinami as part of Fujinami's retirement ceremony.

In 2005, Yuke's, a Japanese video company, purchased Inoki's controlling 51.5% stock in New Japan.

=== Post NJPW years (2005–2022) ===
In 2007, Inoki founded a new promotion called Inoki Genome Federation (IGF).

On 1 February 2010, World Wrestling Entertainment (WWE) announced on its Japanese website that Inoki would be inducted into the WWE Hall of Fame. Inoki was presented with a Hall of Fame certificate by WWE's Ed Wells.

In 2017, Inoki created a new company, ISM. ISM held its first event on 24 June of that year. On 23 March 2018, Inoki left IGF.

In October 2019, Inoki appeared at a Pro Wrestling Zero1 event at the Yasukuni Shrine, which is controversial for its relation to World War II.

In August 2022, Inoki established the Inoki Genki Factory to serve as his official management company. It was later reported that the Inoki Genki Factory was looking into the idea of hosting professional wrestling and mixed martial arts events.

== Political career ==
=== House of Councillors ===
==== 1989–1995: First stint ====
Following in his father's footsteps, Inoki entered politics in 1989, when he was elected into the House of Councillors as a representative of his own Sports and Peace Party in the 1989 Japanese House of Councillors election. Inoki's win secured him among the highest offices ever won by a professional wrestling personality in politics. The Sports and Peace Party later formed a parliamentary alliance with the Democratic Socialist Party. On 14 October 1989, Inoki was stabbed during a political event in Aizuwakamatsu, Fukushima Prefecture. Emulating Muhammad Ali, Inoki traveled to Iraq in 1990 in "an unofficial one-man diplomatic mission" to negotiate with Saddam Hussein for the release of Japanese hostages before the outbreak of the Gulf War. He personally organized a wrestling event in Iraq to entice Saddam to free the 41 captive Japanese nationals, this ultimately proved to be a success with 36 Japanese nationals freed. Inoki subsequently retained his seat in the 1992 Japanese House of Councillors election. He failed to win re-election in the 1995 Japanese House of Councillors election following a number of scandals reported in 1994, and left politics for the next eighteen years.

==== 2013–2019: Second stint ====
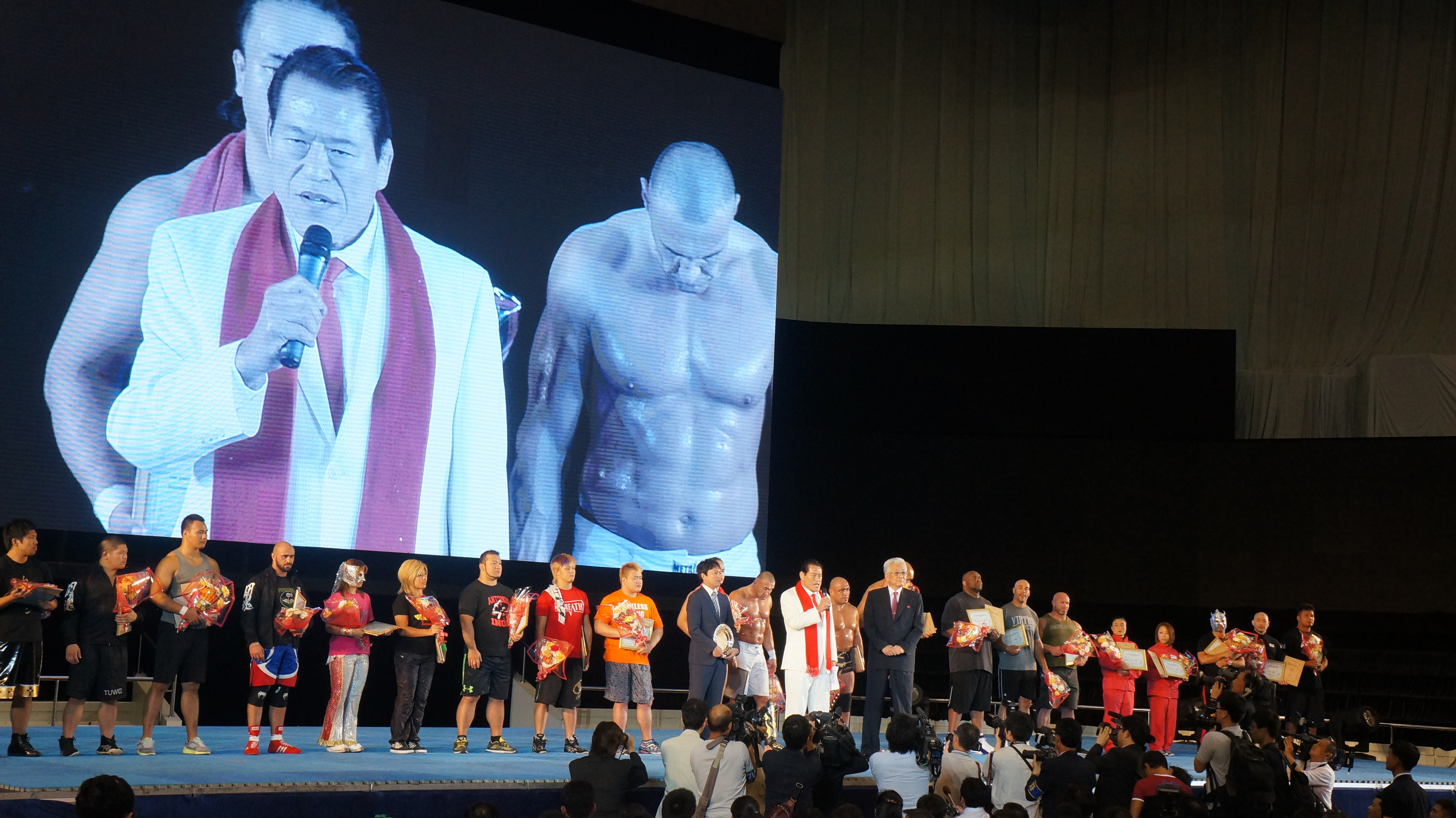
Inoki delivering a speech in North Korea, 2014. Inoki's regular visits to the country strained his relations with the Japanese Diet.

On 5 June 2013, Inoki announced that he would again run for a House of Councillors seat in the National Diet under the Japan Restoration Party ticket. Inoki won the election to return to Japan's Upper House as an MP.

In November 2013, he was suspended from the Diet for 30 days because of an unauthorized trip to North Korea. He had visited on the occasion of the 60th anniversary of the armistice in the Korean War, and had met with senior North Korean figure Kim Yong-nam during his visit. This was Inoki's 27th visit to North Korea; he explained that the North Korean abductions of Japanese citizens had caused the Japanese government to "close the door" on diplomacy with the North, but that the issue would not be resolved without ongoing communication, and that he saw his relationship with North Korean-born Rikidōzan as a crucial link to the people of the North.

He was reportedly considering running for governor of Tokyo in 2014 following another visit to North Korea.

Inoki joined the splinter of the Japan Restoration Party, Party for Future Generations, in 2014. In January 2015, he helped to establish a new party named the Assembly to Energize Japan, which he left in 2016, to sit in the Independents Club.

In September 2017, Inoki re-established his position that Japan should make more of an effort to have co-operative dialogue with North Korea, in the wake of North Korea launching ballistic missiles over Hokkaido. This was succeeded by another of Inoki's controversial trips to the nation.

In June 2019, Inoki announced his retirement from politics.

=== Other positions ===
On 23 June 1989, Inoki founded the Sports and Peace Party, his own political party. Inoki served as the party's leader until the 1998 House of Councillors election when he was succeeded by Iichi Nishime. In 2002, Inoki was appointed a Goodwill Ambassador of Palau; Inoki would again be appointed a Japanese Goodwill Ambassador to Palau in 2013.

From August 2014 until December 2014, Inoki served as the director of the National Sports Bureau of the Party for Future Generations and as a chairperson of the Policy Research Committee of the House of Councillors. On 1 March 2015, Inoki was appointed as a Goodwill Ambassador for the 2016 Summer Olympics by the National Olympic Committee of Cambodia. From 2015 until 2016, Inoki served as the supreme advisor of the Assembly to Energize Japan, a political party he co-founded with Kota Matsuda.

== Mixed martial arts involvement ==
Inoki was amongst the group of professional wrestlers who were tutored in the art of hooking and shooting by the professional wrestler Karl Gotch. This method of wrestling taught to Inoki by Gotch borrowed heavily from professional wrestling's original catch wrestling roots, and is one of the most important influences of modern shoot wrestling. Inoki named his method of fighting "strong style" and it is sometimes referred to as "Inokiism".

Inoki faced many opponents from all dominant disciplines of combat from various parts of the world, such as boxers, judoka, karateka, kung fu practitioners, sumo wrestlers, and fellow professional wrestlers. These bouts included a match with then-prominent karate competitor Everett Eddy. Eddy had previously competed in a mixed skills bout against boxer Horst Geisler and lost by knockout. The bout with Eddy ended with the karateka knocked out by a professional wrestling powerbomb followed by a Hulk Hogan-esque leg drop. Another such match pitted Inoki against 6'7" Kyokushin karate stylist Willie Williams, who had allegedly fought a bear for a 1976 Japanese film titled The Strongest Karate 2. This bout ended when a doctor stopped the fight after both competitors repeatedly fell out of the ring. Although many of the matches were predetermined and scripted, they are seen as a precursor to modern mixed martial arts (MMA). When asked about Inoki's fighting skills, business colleague Carlson Gracie stated Inoki was "one of the best fighters he'd seen."

His most famous bout was against heavyweight boxing champion Muhammad Ali on 26 June 1976, in Tokyo. Inoki initially promised Ali a predetermined match to get him to fight in Japan, but when the deal materialized, Ali's camp feared that Inoki would turn the fight into a shoot, which many believe was Inoki's intention. Ali visited a professional wrestling match involving Inoki and witnessed Inoki's grappling ability. The rules of the match were announced several months in advance. Two days before the match, however, several new rules were added which severely limited the moves that each man could perform. One rule change, specifying that Inoki could only throw a kick if one of his knees was on the ground, had a major effect on the outcome of the fight. Ali landed a total of six punches to Inoki, and Inoki kept to his back in a defensive position for almost the entire duration of the match of 15 rounds, hitting Ali with a low kick repeatedly. The bout ended in a draw, 3–3. Ali left without a press conference and suffered damage to his legs as a result of Inoki's repeated kicks.

Following his retirement from professional wrestling, Inoki promoted a number of MMA events such as UFO Legend, NJPW Ultimate Crush (which showcased pro wrestling matches and MMA matches on the same card), and the annual Inoki Bom-Ba-Ye shows which took place on New Year's Eve in 2000, 2001, 2002, and 2003. Some of the major attractions of these events involved the best of NJPW against world-renowned fighters in legitimate MMA matches. Inoki faced mixed martial artist Renzo Gracie in an exhibition match at the 2000 Inoki Bom-Ba-Ye.

On 28 August 2002, Inoki participated in the Shockwave event co-promoted by K-1 and the Pride Fighting Championships; with a reported attendance of 91,107, Shockwave remains the highest attended live event in MMA's history. The event's opening ceremony saw Inoki dropping into the National Stadium by parachute and then being joined by Hélio Gracie. After being dubbed the "founding fathers of MMA", the two lit a ceremonial Olympic Torch together.

Future UFC Light Heavyweight Champion Lyoto Machida began his career in MMA under the management of Inoki. Machida was described by Inoki as a symbolic "successor" figure for himself, as Naoya Ogawa and Kazuyuki Fujita had been in the past. In 2003, Inoki co-founded the Brazilian MMA promotion Jungle Fight with Wallid Ismail. Inoki was also the ambassador for the International Fight League's Tokyo entry before that promotion's demise. Additionally, Inoki's Inoki Genome Federation promoted both professional wrestling matches and mixed martial arts fights.

== Personal life ==
Inoki married American woman Diana (also known as Linda) Tuck in 1965. The couple had a daughter, but Inoki and Tuck separated after two years. Inoki's daughter died at age 8.

Inoki was married to actress Mitsuko Baisho from 1971 to 1987, and together they had a daughter, Hiroko. Inoki married for a third time in 1989, with his third wife giving birth to Inoki's first son. The couple divorced in 2012. Inoki's son attended Columbia University in New York City. In 2014, Inoki took Haroon Abid, nephew of his Pakistani rival Zubair Jhara Pahalwan, under his guardianship. Inoki's fourth wife, Tazuko Tada, died on 27 August 2019.

Inoki has two grandsons, Hirota and Naoto Inoki. Hirota was a swimmer for Santa Monica College, having previously set school records in swimming at El Segundo High School. In June 2023, Hirota was appointed to the board of directors of the Inoki Genki Factory. In January 2024, it was reported that Naoto was training in professional wrestling under Katsuyori Shibata, having previously trained under the staff of the L.A. Inoki Dojo. Naoto additionally trains in mixed martial arts (MMA) at Black House MMA. On 20 July 2024, Naoto made his professional wrestling debut, defeating Casanova at a Backyard Squabbles event. On 18 November 2026, Naoto offically signed with New Japan Pro-Wrestling.

Inoki had a real-life friendship turned rivalry with former tag team partner Shohei "Giant" Baba, with Inoki vowing to never enter one of Baba's All Japan Pro Wrestling (AJPW) rings. In one of his last major public appearances prior to his death, Inoki appeared at an AJPW-promoted memorial show for Baba in February 2019; Inoki paid his respects to his former friend from ringside, unwilling to break his personal vow to never step inside an AJPW ring.

Inoki converted to Shia Islam in 1990 during a pilgrimage to Karbala, the Shiite holy city in Iraq. He had traveled to Iraq to negotiate the release of several Japanese hostages. While in Iraq, Inoki undertook the Islamic moniker Muhammad Hussain Inoki (Arabic: محمد حسين اينوكي, romanized: Muhamad Husayn Aynwky), later reportedly describing himself as both a Muslim convert and a Buddhist. In 2014, Inoki said he was "usually a Buddhist".

Inoki operated a wrestling-themed restaurant in Shinjuku, Tokyo, named Antonio's Inoki Sakaba Shinjuku. Inoki additionally founded the Anton Trading Company, a food distribution business. One of its major successes was helping to further popularize American-made Tabasco Brand Pepper Sauce in Japan. Inoki's company not only distributed and promoted the sauce for many years in the country, but Inoki himself also appeared as a celebrity spokesperson for Tabasco. His cartoon likeness was used in Tabasco's print advertisements, and he appeared in at least one Japanese television commercial for the sauce.

Inoki is the namesake of two islands, the Inoki Friendship Island in Cuba and the Inoki Island in Palau. In 2021, it was reported that spinal issues had confined Inoki to a wheelchair.

== Death ==
On 1 October 2022 (30 September in Eastern Time), at age 79, Inoki died from systemic transthyretin amyloidosis. Inoki was given a Buddhist funeral, and bestowed the Buddhist posthumous name Tōgakuin Kikon Kandō Koji (闘覚院機魂寛道居士).

== Legacy ==
American professional wrestling promotion WWE paid tribute to Inoki on the 30 September episode of SmackDown. On 1 October, at Royal Quest II in London, England, New Japan Pro-Wrestling (NJPW) held a ten-bell salute for Inoki. Numerous other Japanese promotions would additionally hold ten-bell salutes for Inoki in the weeks and months following his death. NPB team Yokohama DeNA BayStars would play Inoki's theme song, "Inoki Bombaye" (itself a remix of "Ali Bombaye (Zaire Chant) I" from Muhammad Ali's 1977 biographical film), at their games as a tribute to Inoki following his death.

On 4 October, NJPW announced that they had made Inoki the promotion's Honorary Chairman for Life prior to his passing. On 10 October, during Declaration of Power, the first NJPW event held in Japan since Inoki's death, the promotion held a second ten-bell salute for Inoki.

On 28 December, Inoki Bom-Ba-Ye x Ganryujima, a memorial show honoring Inoki, was organized by the Inoki Genki Factory in collaboration with Samurai Warriors Ganryujima and NJPW. Three days later, on 31 December, mixed martial arts promotion Rizin held their Rizin 40 event as a memorial for Inoki. On 4 January 2023, NJPW held their Wrestle Kingdom 17 event in tribute to Inoki. On 9 June, NJPW, All Japan Pro Wrestling, and Pro Wrestling Noah held All Together: Again to celebrate Inoki's legacy.

On 16 January 2023, Inoki was posthumously awarded the Order of the Rising Sun by the Government of Japan. On that same day, it was announced that Inoki had been awarded the Junior Fourth Rank in Japan's ikai court ranks system. On 9 June, the Japan Anniversary Association declared 1 October to be Antonio Inoki Fighting Spirit Day. On 9 September, a statue of Inoki was unveiled at Sōji-ji, a large Zen temple in Yokohama.

America's All Elite Wrestling held an event on 1 October 2023, the one-year anniversary of Inoki's death, titled WrestleDream that was organized in honor of Inoki. WrestleDream has since been established as an annual event held by AEW in tribute to Inoki.

On 14 December 2024, the Antonio Inoki Memorial Show was organized in Shanghai, China by NJPW and various Asia-Pacific Federation of Wrestling promotions.

Two of Inoki's former students, Durango Kid and Laberinto, currently run a lucha libre promotion that bears his name, Inoki Sports Management. The two also serve as the head trainers of a wrestling school named the L.A. Inoki Dojo.

== In media ==
A character based on Inoki called "Kanji Igari" appears in the Japanese manga series Baki the Grappler by Keisuke Itagaki.

Inoki appears in the manga and anime series Tiger Mask, in a secondary role: he is the only one who was able to win over Naoto "Tiger Mask" Date, with the two subsequently becoming best friends.

Under the names "Kanta Inokuma" and "Armand Inokuma", Inoki appears in the manga Rasputin the Patriot by Takashi Nagasaki and Junji Itō, a manga heavily based on the book Trap of the State written by ex-diplomat and political writer Masaru Satō. This manga reveals Inoki's experience when he visited Russia to meet with vice president of the Soviet Union Gennady Yanayev in May 1991, three months before the Soviet coup attempt. According to the manga, Inoki correctly predicted that Yanayev would be the one to lead the coup d'état attempt in August.

Inoki appeared in the film The Bad News Bears Go to Japan as himself. A subplot in his scenes involved Inoki seeking a rematch with Ali. Gene LeBell, who also appears in these scenes as a manager of Inoki's scheduled opponent, Mean Bones Beaudine, was the referee of Inoki's match with Ali. Inoki's appearance in the film culminates with a match against the main character, Marvin Lazar (played by Tony Curtis), when Beaudine suddenly becomes unavailable to participate. Professional wrestler Héctor Guerrero served as Curtis's stunt double for the wrestling portions of this scene.

Inoki had the starring role in the film Acacia directed by Jinsei Tsuji.

In Oh!Great's manga Air Gear, Inoki is regularly referred to by the author, and by the manga's characters as an influence on their fighting style. The manga also makes several references to Inoki's large chin.

Inoki made an appearance as the guest in 2005 Doraemon episode "The Pitch-Black Pop Stars", where he wrestled Gian after he splashed ink on his face.

Several episodes of the Japanese comedy show Downtown no Gaki no Tsukai ya Arahende!!, most notably 2007's "Do Not Laugh at the Hospital" and 2009's "Do Not Laugh as a Hotel Man", have included parodies of Inoki. In the former, three "patients" are presented as being Inoki, with each imitating Inoki's in-ring persona; while in the latter, the guest known only as "Shin Onii" was asked to imitate Inoki as if he were a hotel bellhop.

In May 2021, Inoki appeared on the Vice on TV series Dark Side of the Ring in an episode covering the 1995 Collision in Korea event.

In 2023, Inoki was the subject of a documentary film, Looking for Antonio Inoki.

== Wrestlers trained ==
Wrestlers trained by Antonio Inoki or the Inoki Dojo:

- Adam Pearce
- Akira Jo
- Alex Koslov
- Akira Maeda
- Amazing Kong
- American Balloon
- Aaron Aguilera
- Atsushi Sawada
- Bad News Allen
- Bobby Quance
- Brad Bradley
- Brian Adams
- Bryan Danielson
- Chad Wicks
- Christopher Daniels
- CM Punk
- Daniel Puder
- Dru Onyx
- Durango Kid
- Finn Bálor
- Hartley Jackson
- Heddi Karaoui
- Hideki Suzuki
- Hiroshi Hase
- Hisakatsu Oya
- Ivan Gomes
- Jack Bull
- Jimmy Ambriz
- Jose Moreno
- Joanie Laurer
- Joey Ryan
- José the Assistant
- Josh Barnett
- Jushin Thunder Liger
- Justin McCully
- Justin White
- Karl Anderson
- Katsuyori Shibata
- Kazunari Murakami
- Kazuyuki Fujita
- Keiji Muto
- Kendo Kashin
- Kengo Kimura
- Kohei Sato
- Kotetsu Yamamoto
- Laberinto
- Masahiro Chono
- Masakatsu Funaki
- Masanobu Kurisu
- Michel Serdan
- Mikey Nicholls
- Minoru Suzuki
- Misterioso Jr.
- Naoya Ogawa
- Nobuhiko Takada
- Osamu Kido
- Ricky Reyes
- Riki Choshu
- Rocky Romero
- Salman Hashimikov
- Sara Del Rey
- Satoru Sayama
- Sean McCully
- Sinn Bodhi
- Shane Eitner
- Shelly Martinez
- Shinsuke Nakamura
- Shinya Hashimoto
- Samoa Joe
- Tadao Yasuda
- Tatsumi Fujinami
- Tatsutoshi Goto
- The Iceman
- Tian Bing
- Tiger Ali Singh
- TJP
- Tommy Williams
- Victor Zangiev
- Willem Ruska
- Yamiki
- Yoshiaki Fujiwara

== Exhibition boxing record ==
1 fight	0 wins	0 losses
Draws	1	

No.	Result	Record	Opponent	Type	Round, time	Date	Location	Notes
1	Draw	0–0–1	Muhammad Ali	PTS	15	26 June 1976	Nippon Budokan, Tokyo, Japan	Under special boxing-wrestling rules

== Championships and accomplishments ==
- Cauliflower Alley Club
  - Lou Thesz Award (2004)
- George Tragos/Lou Thesz Professional Wrestling Hall of Fame
  - Class of 2005
- International Professional Wrestling Hall of Fame
  - Class of 2021
- Japan Pro Wrestling Alliance
  - NWA International Tag Team Championship (4 times) – with Shohei Baba
  - All Asia Tag Team Championship (4 times) – with Michiaki Yoshimura (3) and Kintarō Ōki (1)
  - 11th World Big League
  - 1st World Tag League with Kantaro Hoshino
  - 2nd World Tag League with Seiji Sakaguchi
- National Wrestling Federation
  - NWF Heavyweight Championship (4 times)
- New Japan Pro-Wrestling
  - IWGP Heavyweight Championship (1 time)
  - IWGP Heavyweight Championship (original version) (2 times)
  - NWA North American Tag Team Championship (Los Angeles/Japan version) (1 time) – with Seiji Sakaguchi
  - Real World Championship (1 time)
  - IWGP League (1984, 1986, 1987, 1988)
  - Japan Cup Tag Team League (1986) with Yoshiaki Fujiwara
  - MSG League (1978–1981)
  - MSG Tag League (1980) with Bob Backlund
  - MSG Tag League (1982) with Hulk Hogan
  - MSG Tag League (1983) with Hulk Hogan
  - MSG Tag League (1984) with Tatsumi Fujinami
  - Six Man Tag Team Cup League (1988) with Riki Choshu & Kantaro Hoshino
  - World League (1974, 1975)
  - Greatest 18 Club inductee
  - Greatest Wrestlers (Class of 2007)
- NWA Big Time Wrestling
  - NWA Texas Heavyweight Championship (1 time)
  - NWA World Tag Team Championship (Texas version) (1 time) – with Duke Keomuka
- NWA Hollywood Wrestling
  - NWA North American Tag Team Championship (Los Angeles/Japan version) (1 time) – with Seiji Sakaguchi
  - NWA United National Championship (1 time)
- NWA Mid-America
  - NWA World Tag Team Championship (Mid-America version) (1 time) – with Hiro Matsuda
- Professional Wrestling Hall of Fame and Museum
  - Class of 2009
- Pro Wrestling Illustrated
  - Ranked No. 16 of the 500 best singles wrestlers in the PWI 500 in 1995
  - Ranked No. 5 of the 500 best singles wrestlers during the "PWI Years" in 2003
  - Ranked No. 12, and 44 of the 100 best tag team of the "PWI Years" with Tatsumi Fujinami and Hulk Hogan, respectively, in 2003
  - Lifetime Achievement Award
  - Stanley Weston Award (2018)
- Pro Wrestling This Week
  - Wrestler of the Week ( 7–13 June 1987)
- Tokyo Pro Wrestling
  - United States Heavyweight Championship (1 time)
  - NWA World Tag Team Championship (Tokyo Pro Wrestling version) (1 time)
- Tokyo Sports
  - 30th Anniversary Lifetime Achievement Award (1990)
  - 50th Anniversary Lifetime Achievement Award (2010)
  - Best Tag Team Award (1975) with Seiji Sakaguchi
  - Best Tag Team Award (1981) with Tatsumi Fujinami
  - Distinguished Service Award (1979, 1982)
  - Lifetime Achievement Award (1989, 2022)
  - Match of the Year Award (1974) vs. Strong Kobayashi on 19 March
  - Match of the Year Award (1975) vs. Billy Robinson on 11 December
  - Match of the Year Award (1979) with Giant Baba vs. Abdullah the Butcher and Tiger Jeet Singh on 26 August
  - Match of the Year Award (1984) vs. Riki Choshu on 2 August
  - MVP Award (1974, 1976, 1977, 1978, 1980, 1981)
  - Special Grand Prize (1983, 1987)
  - Technique Award (1985)
- Universal Wrestling Association
  - UWA World Heavyweight Championship (1 time)
- World Championship Wrestling
  - WCW Hall of Fame (Class of 1995)
- World Wide Wrestling Federation/World Wrestling Federation/World Wrestling Entertainment
  - WWF Heavyweight Championship (1 time, unrecognized) (Note: WWE does not officially recognize this reign due to a "controversial finish," instead acknowledging Bob Backlund's reign as uninterrupted.)
  - WWWF/WWF World Martial Arts Heavyweight Championship (2 times, inaugural)
  - WWE Hall of Fame (Class of 2010)
- Wrestling Observer Newsletter
  - Promoter of the Year (2001)
  - Wrestling Observer Newsletter Hall of Fame (Class of 1996)

== Decorations received by Inoki ==
Award or decoration		Country	Date	Ref.
	Order of the Southern Cross	Brazil	20 December 1974	
	Order of Friendship	North Korea	15 September 2010	
	Friendship Medal	Cuba	20 November 2012	
	Order of the Rising Sun	Japan	16 January 2023	
N/A	Junior Fourth Rank	Japan	16 January 2023	
