= Kurt Angle =

American wrestler (born 1968)

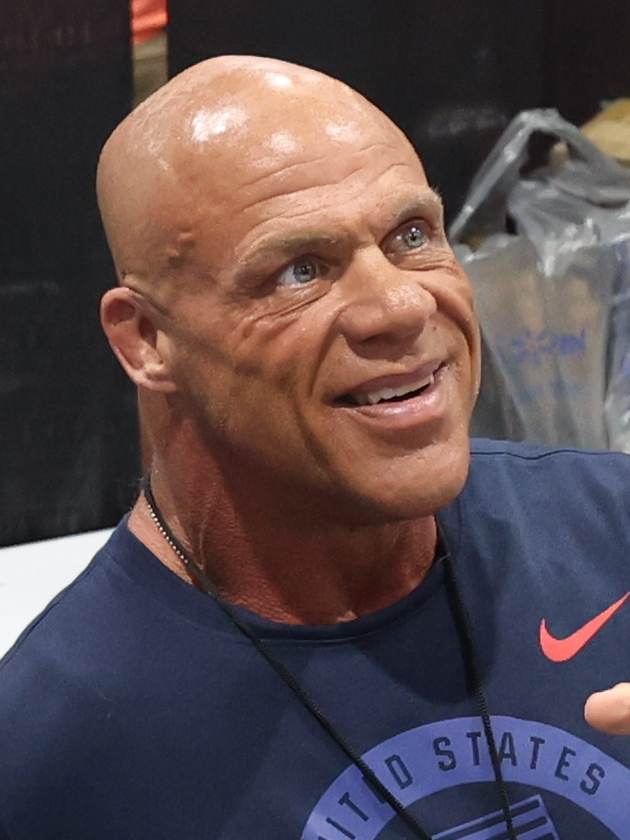
- Angle in 2025

Personal information
- Born: December 9, 1968 (age 57) Mt. Lebanon, Pennsylvania, U.S.
- Spouses: Karen Smedley (m. 1998; div. 2008) Giovanna Yannotti (m. 2012)
- Children: 5
- Relatives: Eric Angle (brother); Jon Bernthal (nephew-in-law)
- Website: kurtanglebrand.com

Professional wrestling career
- Billed height: 6 ft 0 in (183 cm)
- Billed weight: 220 lb (100 kg)
- Billed from: Pittsburgh, Pennsylvania
- Trained by: Dory Funk Jr.; Tom Prichard
- Debut: August 20, 1998
- Retired: April 7, 2019
- Sports career
Medal record
Men's freestyle wrestling
Representing the United States
Olympic Games
Gold medal – first place	1996 Atlanta	100 kg
World Championships
Gold medal – first place	1995 Atlanta	100 kg
World Cup
Silver medal – second place	1995 Chattanooga	100 kg
Bronze medal – third place	1992 Moscow	100 kg
Collegiate Wrestling
Representing the Clarion Golden Eagles
NCAA Division I Championships
Gold medal – first place	1990 College Park	275 lb
Gold medal – first place	1992 Oklahoma City	275 lb
Silver medal – second place	1991 Iowa City	275 lb

Kurt Steven Angle (born December 9, 1968) is an American retired professional wrestler and former amateur wrestler. He is a sports analyst for Real American Freestyle. He first earned recognition for winning a gold medal in freestyle wrestling at the 1996 Summer Olympics despite competing with a broken neck, and achieved wider fame and recognition for his tenures in World Wrestling Entertainment (WWE) from 1998 to 2006, and 2017 to 2019, and in Total Nonstop Action Wrestling (TNA) from 2006 to 2016.

Angle won numerous accolades while at Clarion University of Pennsylvania, including being a two-time NCAA Division I Wrestling Champion in the Heavyweight division. After graduating, he won gold medals in freestyle wrestling at the 1995 World Wrestling Championships and 1996 Summer Olympics. He is one of four people to win the Junior Nationals, NCAA, World Championships, and the Olympics. In 2006, he was named by USA Wrestling as the greatest shoot wrestler of all time and as one of USA Wrestling's top 15 college wrestlers of all time. In 2016, he was inducted into the International Sports Hall of Fame.

Angle made his first appearance at a professional wrestling event in 1996, and signed with the WWF (now WWE) in 1998. Although he was never a fan of professional wrestling and previously had a negative opinion of it due to its scripted nature, he was noted for his natural aptitude for it; after training for only a few days, he had his debut match within the WWF's developmental system in August 1998 and had his first official WWF match in March 1999. After months of dark matches, Angle made his televised in-ring debut in November 1999. Within two months, he was holding the European and Intercontinental Championships simultaneously. Four months later, he won the 2000 King of the Ring tournament and began pursuing the WWF Championship, which he won in October and would go on to win a total of four times. He also became a one-time WCW Champion and one-time World Heavyweight Champion. He is the tenth professional wrestler to achieve the WWE Triple Crown and the fifth to achieve the WWE Grand Slam. He was inducted into the WWE Hall of Fame's class of 2017.

After leaving WWE in 2006, Angle joined TNA, where he became a record six-time TNA World Heavyweight Champion (and the inaugural) and the second TNA Triple Crown winner, holding all three TNA championships simultaneously. He is also a two-time King of the Mountain. During his tenure with TNA, he also competed for New Japan Pro-Wrestling (NJPW) and the Inoki Genome Federation (IGF), winning the IWGP Heavyweight Championship once. In 2013, he was inducted into the TNA Hall of Fame. He is the second wrestler, after Sting, to be inducted into both the WWE and TNA Halls of Fame.

Angle has won over 21 professional wrestling championships and is an overall 13-time world champion. He is the only wrestler to have won the WWE Championship, World Heavyweight Championship, WCW Championship, TNA World Heavyweight Championship, IWGP Heavyweight Championship, and an NCAA Wrestling Championship. He is also the first person to hold both the WWE and TNA Triple Crowns. He has headlined numerous pay-per-view events, including WrestleMania XIX and Bound for Glory on three occasions (in 2007, 2010, and 2011), the flagship events of WWE and TNA, respectively. In 2004, the Wrestling Observer Newsletter inducted Angle into its Hall of Fame and later named him "Wrestler of the Decade" for the 2000s. Fellow professional wrestler John Cena called Angle "without question the most gifted all-around performer we have ever had step into a ring" and said "there will never be another like him".

== Early life ==
Kurt Steven Angle was born in Mt. Lebanon, Pennsylvania, on December 9, 1968, the son of Jackie and David Angle. He is of Welsh, German, Irish, Polish and Lithuanian descent. He has four older brothers named David, Mark, John, and Eric, the latter of whom is also a wrestler; his older sister, Le'Anne, died at the age of 43 in 2003. He attended Clarion University of Pennsylvania, graduating with a degree in education in 1993. His father was a crane operator who died in a construction accident while working on Fifth Avenue Place when Angle was 16. Angle dedicated both his career and his autobiography to his father. He stated in an interview that, following his father's death, he regarded his wrestling coach David Schultz as a paternal figure. While training Angle, Schultz was murdered in January 1996 by John Eleuthère du Pont, the sponsor of Schultz's team of Olympic prospectives. Angle's mother died of cancer in 2015.

== Amateur wrestling career ==
Kurt Angle started amateur wrestling at the age of seven. He attended Mt. Lebanon High School, where he won varsity letters in football, as an All-State linebacker, and wrestling. He was undefeated on the freshman wrestling team and qualified for the state wrestling tournament his sophomore year. Angle placed third at the state wrestling tournament as a junior and was the 1987 Pennsylvania Class AAA wrestling state champion as a senior.

Upon graduating from high school, Angle attended Clarion University of Pennsylvania, where he continued to wrestle at the amateur level. He was a two-time National Collegiate Athletic Association Division I champion, national runner-up in 1991, and a three-time NCAA Division I All-American. In addition, Angle was the 1987 USA Junior Freestyle champion, a two-time USA Senior Freestyle champion, and the 1988 USA International Federation of Associated Wrestling Styles Junior World Freestyle champion.

After graduating from college, Angle continued to wrestle, though he did have an unsuccessful tryout with the Pittsburgh Steelers at running back, despite not playing football in college. In 1995, he won a gold medal at the FILA Wrestling World Championships in Atlanta, Georgia. Following this victory, Angle began preparing for the 1996 Summer Olympics (also in Atlanta) under Dave Schultz at the Pennsylvanian Foxcatcher Club, training between eight and ten hours a day. In January 1996, not long after Angle began training at the club, Schultz was murdered by John Eleuthère du Pont, the sponsor of Schultz's team of Olympic prospectives. As a result, Angle quit du Pont's team, searched for new sponsors, and joined the Dave Schultz Wrestling Club in Schultz's memory.

Angle faced further hardships while taking part in the 1996 Olympic Trials, when he suffered a severe neck injury, fracturing two of his cervical vertebrae, herniating two discs, and pulling four muscles. Nonetheless, Angle won the trials and then spent the subsequent five months resting and rehabilitating. By the Olympics, Angle was able to compete, albeit with several pain-reducing injections in his neck. In the fall of 1996, Angle stated that he temporarily became addicted to the analgesic Vicodin after injuring his neck. He won his gold medal in the heavyweight (90–100 kg; 198–220 lb) weight class despite his injury, defeating several competitors including Mongolian Dolgorsürengiin Sumyaabazar, Cuban Wilfredo Morales, Ukrainian Sagid Murtazaliev, and others. Angle won four close matches to earn his spot in the gold-medal finals.

In 2006, Angle was named the greatest shoot wrestler of all time by USA Wrestling, as well as one of the top 15 college wrestlers. In April 2011, Angle revealed that he was planning a comeback to amateur wrestling for the 2012 Summer Olympics in London. He later announced he was unable to make the trials for the national team due to a knee injury, though he held an honorary title as team manager. In 2016, Angle was inducted into the International Sports Hall of Fame for his amateur wrestling accomplishments.

== Professional wrestling career ==
=== Extreme Championship Wrestling (1996) ===
On October 26, 1996, Angle was convinced by fellow Pittsburgh native Shane Douglas to attend the Extreme Championship Wrestling (ECW) event High Incident. He gave an in-ring interview and provided guest commentary during a match between Taz and Little Guido, but left the building after Raven attached Sandman to a cross using barbed wire. Angle, shocked by the controversial imagery and afraid that his career prospects were going to be damaged if he was associated with the incident, threatened to sue ECW owner Paul Heyman if he was shown on television in the same broadcast as the stunt.

=== World Wrestling Federation/Entertainment (1998–2006) ===
==== Training and developmental (1998–1999) ====
Despite achieving success in amateur wrestling, Angle initially held professional wrestling in low regard. He rejected a decade-long contract with the WWF due to his unwillingness to accept scripted losses. His opinion of professional wrestling changed when he began watching WWF Raw is War in 1998 and developed an admiration for Stone Cold Steve Austin's talents as an entertainer. He later conceded that his negative attitude toward the industry was misguided and "stupid".

In 1998, Angle had a tryout with the WWF after the rescindment of the WWF's original 1996 offer. He was subsequently signed to a five-year deal in August 1998, just three days after his tryout. Angle trained under Dory Funk Jr. at the Funkin' Dojo training camp in Stamford, Connecticut. Within a week, he started wrestling in front of a live audience. His debut match occurred in the WWF's then-developmental territory WWA on August 20, where he faced his trainer Tom Prichard.

Angle continued to wrestle for the WWA in August and September. Additionally, he sought bookings outside of the WWF, participating in a battle royal won by Steve Williams at the National Wrestling Alliance's (NWA) 50th Anniversary Show on October 24. Angle also performed for Pennsylvania Championship Wrestling (PCW) defeating Steve Bradley and the East Coast Wrestling Association (ECWA) in February 1999 defeating Cyborg.

In March, Angle began wrestling regularly for the WWF's Power Pro Wrestling (PPW) developmental league in Memphis, Tennessee. He appeared on WWF television on Sunday Night Heat, where he took part in an angle with Tiger Ali Singh. He won over Brian Christopher on April 11. In the following months, Angle wrestled on house shows and in other dark matches, in preparation for his televised debut. He faced against Owen Hart in a dark match on Shotgun Saturday Night just two weeks before Owen died. He also continued to wrestle for PPW through October and on July 24 won the PPW Championship. Angle then lost the championship to Steve Bradley on August 7. He is noted for learning the art of pro wrestling quicker than almost anyone else; WWE executive and former opponent Triple H described Angle as "probably the fastest guy I've ever seen pick this business up", owing to "phenomenal" athleticism and an "aptitude" for the industry.

==== Historic rookie year (1999–2000) ====
Angle made his televised WWF debut on November 14, 1999, at Survivor Series, where he defeated Shawn Stasiak. He remained undefeated in singles competition until losing to the debuting Tazz at the Royal Rumble on January 23, 2000.

In the months that followed, Angle captured both the WWF European Championship (on the February 10 episode of WWF SmackDown!) and the WWF Intercontinental Championship (at No Way Out on February 27), holding both titles simultaneously. He lost both championships in a triple threat match at WrestleMania 2000 without being pinned.

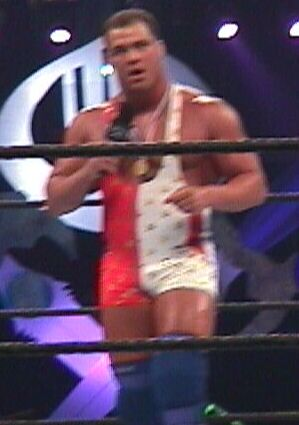
Angle at King of the Ring in 2000 – a tournament he eventually won

Throughout mid-2000, Angle aligned himself with Edge & Christian and feuded with Too Cool and Rikishi, with Angle defeating Rikishi in the finals of the King of the Ring tournament at King of the Ring on June 25. Later he feuded with Triple H and Stephanie McMahon, which culminated in a triple threat match at SummerSlam on August 27 for the WWF Championship also involving The Rock, who retained his championship.

On October 22, Angle defeated The Rock at No Mercy to win the WWF Championship for the first time, making him the first world champion in both freestyle and professional wrestling. Angle's first year on the main roster is widely regarded as the most impressive rookie year in professional wrestling history. In under 12 months, he won multiple championships, headlined pay-per-view events, and quickly established himself as a main event-level talent. Wrestling publications and analysts have often cited his 1999–2000 run as one of the most accomplished debut years ever seen in the industry.

==== WWF Champion (2000–2002) ====
Angle retained the WWF Championship for the rest of the year in matches with The Undertaker at Survivor Series on November 19 and in a six-man Hell in a Cell match against The Undertaker, Stone Cold Steve Austin, The Rock, Triple H, and Rikishi at Armageddon on December 10. After beating Triple H at the Royal Rumble on January 21, 2001, Angle eventually lost the title to The Rock at No Way Out on February 25. Angle then feuded with Chris Benoit, whom he defeated at WrestleMania X-Seven on April 1, but lost to him at Backlash on April 29 in an Ultimate Submission match. Continuing the feud, Angle again defeated Benoit in a two-out-of-three-falls match at Judgment Day on May 20.

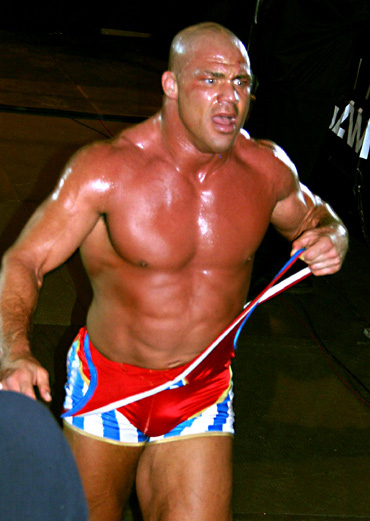
Angle on SmackDown!

When World Championship Wrestling (WCW) and ECW were purchased by the WWF in 2001, wrestlers from WCW and ECW formed The Alliance. Angle and WWF Champion Stone Cold Steve Austin joined forces to repel them, turning Angle face in the process. At the Invasion event on July 22, Angle and Austin captained a team of five WWF superstars against members of the Alliance. Team WWF lost to Team Alliance when Austin turned on Team WWF to join the Alliance. Angle then began feuding with Austin over the WWF Championship and challenged him for the title at SummerSlam on August 19, and defeated Austin by disqualification. After winning and losing the WCW Championship, WCW United States Championship, and the WWF Hardcore Championship in matches with Alliance members, Angle defeated Austin to win his second WWF Championship at Unforgiven on September 23. Angle lost the title to Austin on the October 8 episode of Raw. Angle later turned heel again and joined the Alliance himself. Angle ultimately returned to the WWF side by enabling The Rock to defeat Austin in a "Winner Takes All" match between the WWF and The Alliance at the Survivor Series on November 18.

In his first Royal Rumble match at the Royal Rumble on January 20, 2002, Angle lasted until the final two before being eliminated by eventual winner Triple H. Angle briefly feuded with Kane, defeating him at WrestleMania X8 on March 17. Angle was drafted to the SmackDown! brand and then reignited his feud with Edge, defeating him at Backlash on April 21. The naturally balding Angle lost a "hair versus hair" match to Edge at Judgment Day on May 19, having his head shaved bald, which he would retain for the rest of his career. During mid-2002, John Cena made his WWE televised debut, losing to Angle after a roll-up pin on the June 27 episode of SmackDown!.

In September 2002, Angle started to feud with Chris Benoit, losing to him at Unforgiven on September 22. Angle and Benoit were teamed together to participate in a tournament to crown the first WWE Tag Team Champions. They won the tournament finals at No Mercy on October 20 making Angle the fifth WWE Grand Slam Champion. The match at No Mercy was named the 2002 Match of the Year by Wrestling Observer Newsletter. They made their first successful title defense by defeating Los Guerreros (Eddie Guerrero and Chavo Guerrero) at Rebellion on October 26. Their reign ended after they lost the title to Edge and Mysterio on the November 7 episode of SmackDown! in a two-out-of-three-falls match. Angle and Benoit would receive another shot at the WWE Tag Team Championship in a triple threat elimination match against Edge and Mysterio and Los Guerreros at Survivor Series on November 17, but failed after they were the first team eliminated; Los Guerreros eventually won.

==== WWE Champion, Team Angle (2002–2004) ====
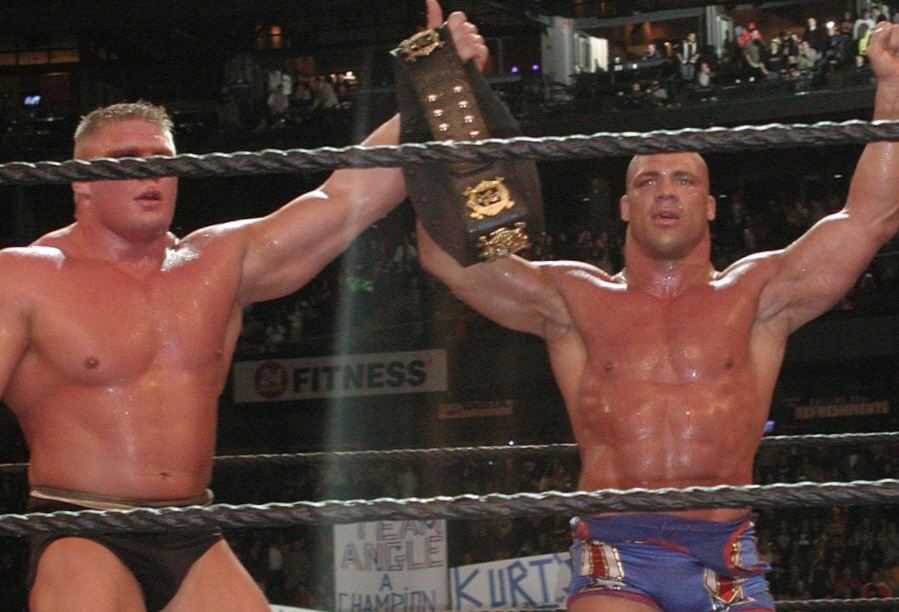
Angle and Brock Lesnar after their WWE Championship title match at WrestleMania XIX

Angle won his third WWE Championship at Armageddon on December 15 by defeating Big Show. During this reign, he aligned with manager Paul Heyman and recently-formed "Team Angle" (Charlie Haas and Shelton Benjamin). At the Royal Rumble on January 19, 2003, Angle defeated Chris Benoit to retain the WWE Championship, before beginning a rivalry with Brock Lesnar, who had won the Royal Rumble match. Angle lost the title to Lesnar at WrestleMania XIX on March 30, needing time off for neck surgery. Rather than a traditional spinal fusion, he underwent a less invasive procedure where only the spurs and selected portions of the discs were removed, reducing his recovery time from one year to three months.

Angle returned as a babyface on the June 5 episode of SmackDown! and a month later won his fourth WWE Championship at Vengeance on July 27 in a triple threat match against Lesnar and Big Show. He successfully defended the title against Lesnar at SummerSlam but lost it back to Lesnar in a 60-Minute Iron Man match on the September 18 episode of SmackDown!. At Survivor Series on November 16, Angle led a five-man team (consisting of himself, Bradshaw, Chris Benoit, Hardcore Holly and John Cena) against Lesnar's (consisting of himself, A-Train, Big Show, Matt Morgan and Nathan Jones), winning the match despite being eliminated by Lesnar.

In early 2004, Angle began feuding with Eddie Guerrero. After becoming number one contender for the WWE Championship at No Way Out on February 15 by defeating John Cena and Big Show, he turned heel by attacking Guerrero during his title defense against Chavo Guerrero on the February 19 episode of SmackDown!. Angle lost to Guerrero at WrestleMania XX on March 14 and later took time off for another neck surgery. He returned as the new SmackDown! General Manager on the March 25 episode of SmackDown!, continuing his feud with Guerrero. At The Great American Bash on June 27, Angle helped JBL defeat Guerrero for the WWE Championship. He was later fired as General Manager by Vince McMahon after faking an injury, leading to a rematch with Guerrero at SummerSlam on August 15, which Angle won.

Angle's feud with Guerrero continued into the fall, culminating in a match at No Mercy on October 3, where Angle lost to Big Show. On the November 4 episode of SmackDown!, during a segment of Tough Enough, Angle challenged contestants to physical competitions, where Chris Nawrocki won an opportunity to have a match against Angle. During this match, Angle would legitimately break Nawrocki's ribs whilst performing a double leg takedown. Angle then faced Daniel Puder, a professional MMA fighter. Puder locked in a kimura lock during their unscripted exchange, but referee Jim Korderas quickly counted a pinfall on Puder despite his shoulders not being down to protect Angle from injury and having to submit. Puder later claimed he would have broken Angle's arm had the match continued, whilst Angle was reported to have been "less than happy backstage" over the whole incident.

==== The Wrestling Machine (2005–2006) ====
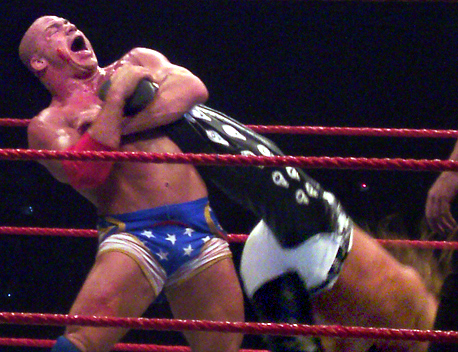
Angle applies the ankle lock to Shawn Michaels

At the Royal Rumble on January 30, 2005, Angle failed to win the WWE Championship in a triple threat match against JBL and Big Show. He later entered the Royal Rumble match but was quickly eliminated by Shawn Michaels. In retaliation, Angle returned to eliminate Michaels, beginning a heated rivalry. After mocking Michaels by defeating Michaels' former tag team partner Marty Jannetty, and attacking Michaels' former manager Sherri Martel, Angle defeated Michaels at WrestleMania 21 on April 3 in a match which won Pro Wrestling Illustrated's Match of the Year award.

Later in mid-April Angle entered a tournament to determine the number-one contender for the WWE Championship, defeating Eddie Guerrero and starting a feud with fellow tournament entrant Booker T. Over the following weeks, in a controversial storyline Angle began sexually harassing Booker T's wife, Sharmell. Booker T defeated Angle at Judgment Day on May 22, but Angle won a mixed handicap against Booker T and Sharmell match on SmackDown! before losing the feud in a final singles match on June 9. A few days later, Angle also appeared at ECW One Night Stand on June 12 as an anti-ECW “crusader” and was involved in a brawl with ECW alumni led by Stone Cold Steve Austin.

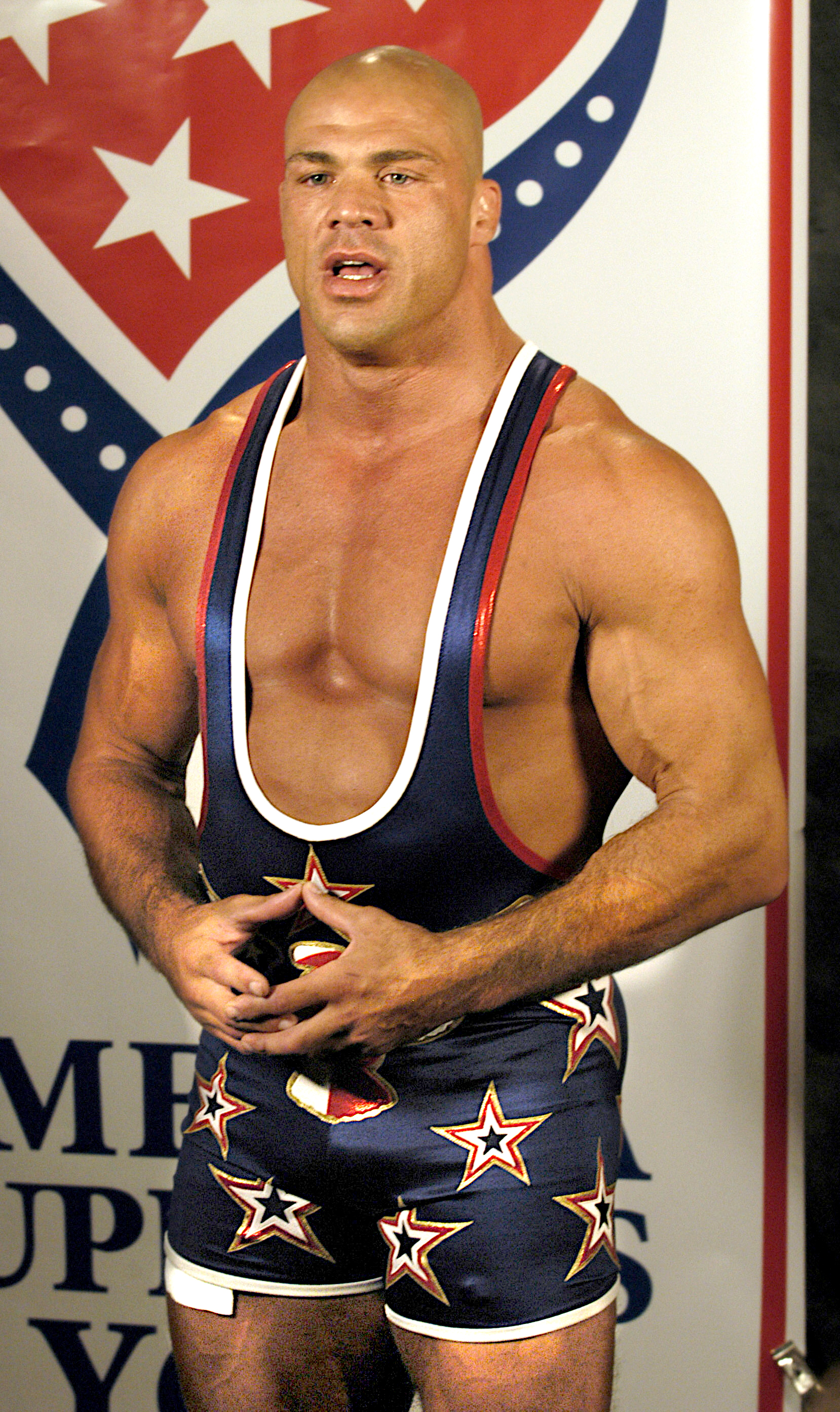
In August 2005, Kurt Angle thanked American troops for their service. Injured servicemembers from Walter Reed attended WWE SummerSlam in Washington, D.C., as special guests.

Following the 2005 WWE draft in June, Angle was moved to the Raw brand and resumed his feud with Michaels, losing to him at Vengeance on June 26. In July he began a brief rivalry with Eugene, who won Angle's Olympic gold medal after Angle was unable to make him submit in a match within three minutes on the July 25 episode of Raw. Angle regained the medal by defeating Eugene at SummerSlam on August 21. Angle then entered a feud with WWE Champion John Cena, facing him at Unforgiven on September 18, Taboo Tuesday on November 1, and Survivor Series on November 27, each time failing to win the title. Angle defeated Cena in a non-title first blood match on the January 2, 2006 episode of Raw, but again failed to capture the WWE Championship at New Year’s Revolution on January 8 in the annual Elimination Chamber match.

Angle returned to the SmackDown! brand on the January 13 episode of SmackDown!, winning a 20-man battle royal as a surprise entrant to win the vacant World Heavyweight Championship, and adopting the moniker known as "The Wrestling Machine" having a more serious ruthlessness to his persona and having a no-nonsense attitude, turning face in the process. He retained the title against Mark Henry at the Royal Rumble on January 29, after which The Undertaker challenged him. At No Way Out on February 19, Angle defeated The Undertaker in a critically acclaimed title match. A rematch on the March 3 episode of SmackDown! ended in disqualification, allowing Angle to retain the title heading into WrestleMania 22 on April 2. However, at WrestleMania, Angle lost the World Heavyweight Championship to Rey Mysterio in a triple threat match, which also involved Randy Orton. In the 2006 brand draft Angle was moved to the new ECW brand, where began quickly squashing opponents.

Angle made sporadic appearances through mid-2006, inlucluding unsuccessfully challenging Rob Van Dam for the ECW World Heavyweight Championship on June 27. On August 25, WWE granted his release due to health concerns. In the Kurt Angle: Champion documentary DVD, Angle stated he had been working through serious injuries and needed time off. His final WWE match was at an ECW house show on August 14, where he defeated Danny Doring.

=== Total Nonstop Action Wrestling (2006–2016) ===
==== The Angle Alliance (2006–2008) ====
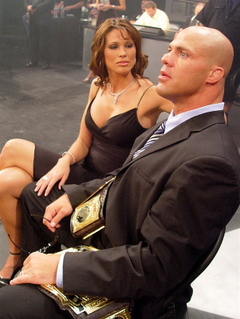
Kurt and Karen Angle watching at ringside during Impact!

Angle debuted in Total Nonstop Action Wrestling (TNA) on October 19, 2006, shortly after signing with the company, making an immediate impact by confronting Samoa Joe, who had refused to return the NWA World Heavyweight Championship belt he had stolen from Jeff Jarrett. The confrontation sparked a heated feud between Angle and Joe, culminating in Angle defeating Joe at Genesis on November 19, ending Joe's undefeated streak in the company. Angle then lost to Joe in a rematch on December 10 at Turning Point.

Angle and Joe fought again at Final Resolution on January 14, 2007, with Angle winning once more and earning a shot at the NWA World Heavyweight Championship. He faced the champion, Christian Cage, at Against All Odds on February 11, but lost due to interference from Tomko and Scott Steiner. This led to a brief feud with Steiner, whom Angle defeated at Destination X on March 11. Angle then captained a team against Cage's in a Lethal Lockdown match at Lockdown on April 15, where the man who gained the winning pinfall would earn a title shot for the NWA World Heavyweight Championship. Angle's team emerged victorious, with Sting being awarded the title shot. However, on the day of Sacrifice on May 13, where Angle, Sting and Cage would face each other for the championship, the National Wrestling Alliance (NWA) severed ties with TNA and stripped its champions of their titles. Despite this, the triple threat match between Angle, Sting, and Cage still took place, with Angle declared the unofficial winner of the new "World Heavyweight Champion" after making Sting submit whilst Sting simultaneously pinned Cage.

In the aftermath, Angle unveiled the newly created TNA World Heavyweight Championship, though the title was later vacated later that night due to the controversial finish at Sacrifice. A tournament for the championship culminated at Slammiversary on June 17, where Angle won the King of the Mountain match, officially becoming the inaugural TNA World Heavyweight Champion. He soon entered into a heated program with Samoa Joe once again, this time playing the role of heel. At Hard Justice on August 12, the two faced off in a tag team match where all championships the two held were on the line at the time; Angle held the TNA World Heavyweight Championship and IWGP Heavyweight Championship, while Joe held the X Division and Tag Team titles. With help from his then-wife Karen Angle, Angle won the bout, becoming TNA’s second Triple Crown champion, as well as the first to hold all eligible titles simultaneously. A month later Angle dropped both the X Division and Tag Team Championships to Jay Lethal and Team Pacman respectively, at No Surrender on September 9.

Angle was more successful on holding on to the TNA World Heavyweight Championship. While he briefly lost the title to Sting at Bound for Glory on October 14, he won it back on the October 25 episode of Impact!. He then formed an alliance with A.J. Styles and Tomko, known as The Angle Alliance, and entered another feud with Christian Cage. He successfully defended the title against Cage at Final Resolution on January 6, 2008 and Against All Odds on February 10 with help from his Alliance. However at Lockdown on April 13, despite interference from the Alliance Angle lost the championship to Samoa Joe.

==== Main Event Mafia (2008–2009) ====
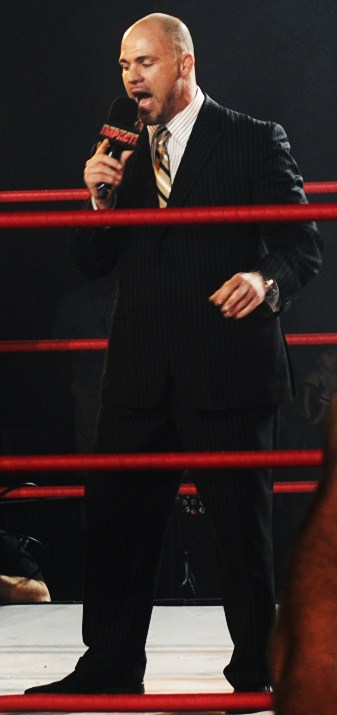
Angle as the "Godfather" of the Main Event Mafia

Later that year, Angle returned from neck injury and attacked A.J. Styles, kicking off another feud which lead to Angle and Jeff Jarrett's paths crossing. After feuding with Styles and Jeff Jarrett throughout the summer, Angle aligned with Jarrett’s enemies (Booker T, Kevin Nash, Sting and Scott Steiner) to form the Main Event Mafia, a stable of established wrestling veterans positioned against younger talent. The stable would dominate TNA for much of late 2008 and early 2009. During this time, Angle had multiple main-event matches with Abyss, Rhino, and continued to feud with Jarrett, culminating in a loss to him at Bound for Glory IV in a match featuring Mick Foley as the enforcer.

In 2009, Angle lost control of the Main Event Mafia to Sting after a match at Sacrifice, but regained leadership after winning the TNA World Heavyweight Championship for a fourth time at Slammiversary via assistance from Samoa Joe. On the following episode of Impact!, Angle and the rest of the Mafia attacked Sting while introducing Joe as their newest member. Angle held the title until No Surrender, losing the belt to A.J. Styles in a five-way match. Angle turned face a month later, praising TNA’s younger talent and leaving the Mafia on the October 22 episode of Impact!.

==== Various feuds (2009–2011) ====
Following his departure from the Main Event Mafia, Angle began feuding with Desmond Wolfe, trading wins in late 2009 before ultimately defeating him in a "Three Degrees of Pain" match at Final Resolution. In early 2010, he entered a title feud with A.J. Styles, now aligned with Ric Flair, losing multiple championship matches against Styles due to murky finishes and interference. Frustrated, Angle teased leaving the company but ultimately stayed and feuded with Mr. Anderson after losing in the 8 Card Stud Tournament at Against All Odds. The feud saw both men trading victories through early 2010, ending with a steel cage match at Lockdown, which Angle won. Angle then took a brief hiatus but returned in May, vowing to climb the new TNA Top 10 Rankings on merit and earn another title shot. Over the next few episodes of Impact! and TNA PPVs, Angle defeated several of the other "Top 10" ranked wrestlers, (Kazarian, Desmond Wolfe, D’Angelo Dinero, Hernandez, and A.J. Styles), boldly claiming that he would retire if he lost during this climb.

Angle would not get the opportunity to rise any higher in the ranks. In August the TNA World Heavyweight Championship was vacated, with an eight-man tournament created to crown anew champion. While Angle was victorious in his first-round match, at No Surrender Angle faced Jeff Hardy in the semi-finals. The match first ended in a time-limit draw and later, after the match was restarted, a no-contest due to Angle accidentally blading his forehead too deeply. Both men were added to the finals at Bound for Glory, where Angle was pinned by Hardy after interference from Eric Bischoff and Hulk Hogan, who turned heel and formed Immortal with Hardy, Jarrett, and Abyss.

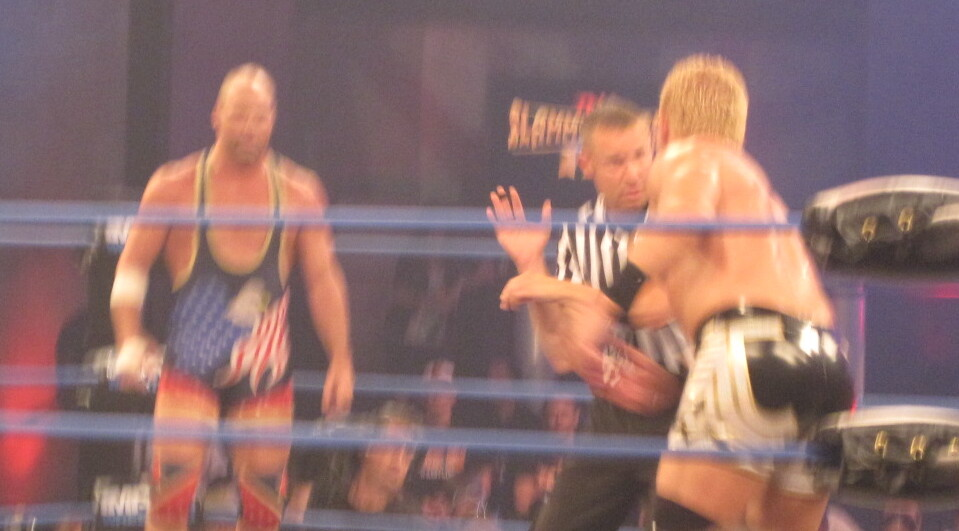
Angle (left) and Jeff Jarrett at Slammiversary IX

Following the loss, on the next episode of Impact! Angle teased making good on his vow and retiring, but was attacked by Jarett and TNA's security officers Gunner and Murphy, with Jarett revealing he was involved with ensuring Angle lost at Bound for Glory. Throughout the spring of 2011 the two would bitterly feud over a series of personal and intense matches, which often featured Jarret's wife (and Angle's ex-wife) Karen, playing upon the real-life tension between the trio. Eventually, the feud ended with Angle defeating Jarrett in a loser-leaves Parking Lot Brawl on the June 16 episode of Impact Wrestling, forcing Jarett to leave TNA.

The month prior, Angle signed a new three-year contract with TNA, stating he was "here for the long haul."

==== Immortal (2011–2012) ====
After ending his feud with Jeff Jarrett, Angle allied with Sting to oppose the Immortal stable, including TNA World Heavyweight Champion Mr. Anderson. On the July 14 episode of Impact Wrestling, Angle helped Sting reclaim the title from Anderson. At Hardcore Justice on August 7, Angle defeated Sting to win the TNA World Heavyweight Championship for a record fifth time, turning heel in the process after hitting him with a chair.

Angle later revealed he opposed Sting’s plan to return control of TNA to Dixie Carter, claiming Carter had lied to him about her knowledge of the Jarretts’ relationship. He aligned with Hulk Hogan and Immortal, vowing to dismantle TNA’s younger talent, starting with attacking Crimson that night. Angle successfully defended the title against Sting on the September 1 episode of Impact Wrestling, Mr. Anderson on the September 8 episode of Impact Wrestling, Mr. Anderson and Sting in a three-way match at No Surrender on September 11, and Bobby Roode at Bound for Glory on October 16. However, on the October 20 episode of Impact Wrestling, Angle lost the TNA World Heavyweight Championship to James Storm.

Angle returned on the November 17 episode of Impact Wrestling, attacking Storm and revealing himself as the person who had cost him a title match the previous week. Their feud continued through the end of 2011, with Storm defeating Angle at Final Resolution on December 11, Angle defeating Storm at Genesis on January 8, 2012, and Storm defeating Angle on the January 12 episode of Impact Wrestling. Angle began a rivalry with Jeff Hardy, defeating him at Victory Road on March 18 but losing a steel cage rematch at Lockdown on April 15. Angle then feuded with A.J. Styles on the April 19 episode of Impact Wrestling. On May 13 at Sacrifice, Angle defeated Styles in a rematch, following another interference from Daniels and Kazarian. After the match, Angle made the save for Styles, chasing Daniels and Kazarian out of the ring. This turned Angle face once again. At Slammiversary on June 10, Angle and Styles defeated the duo to win the TNA World Tag Team Championship. On the following episode of Impact Wrestling, Angle entered the 2012 Bound for Glory Series, taking part in the opening gauntlet match, from which he was eliminated by Daniels.

Two weeks later, Angle and Styles lost the TNA World Tag Team Championship back to Daniels and Kazarian. Angle wrestled his final match in the 2012 Bound for Glory Series on the August 30 episode of Impact Wrestling, losing to Jeff Hardy, which resulted in him being eliminated from the tournament. Angle and Styles unsuccessfully challenged for the TNA World Tag Team Championship on September 9 at No Surrender and Bound for Glory on October 14. On the following episode of Impact Wrestling, Angle defeated Daniels and Styles in a three-way match to become one of four wrestlers in consideration for a shot at the TNA World Heavyweight Championship.

==== New Main Event Mafia (2012–2013) ====
In late 2012, Angle began feuding with the Aces & Eights stable after being attacked by them on the October 25 episode of Impact Wrestling. He defeated stable member Devon at Turning Point An and continued battling the group with other wrestlers such as Samoa Joe and Wes Brisco. He later unmasked D'Lo Brown as the group's vice president and continued feuding with Aces & Eights through early 2013.

By May, Angle had entered a feud with A.J. Styles, who had refused to answer whether was associated with Aces & Eights on the May 9, 2013, episode of Impact Wrestling. This resulted in a match at Slammiversary XI, where Angle won. That same night, he was announced as the second inductee into the TNA Hall of Fame. Shortly after, Angle began a storyline with the debuting Rampage Jackson and later joined Sting in reforming the Main Event Mafia. The new faction would soon recruit Samoa Joe, Magnus, and Jackson. Angle's association with the storyline would be cut short, following when in August he went on hiatus after entering rehab for drug and alcohol use.

==== Director of Wrestling Operations (2013–2014) ====
Angle returned on the October 10, 2013, episode of Impact Wrestling, attacking EGO and challenging Bobby Roode to a match at Bound For Glory. In the lead-up, Roode mocked Angle’s Hall of Fame induction, provoking a feud. At the pay-per-view, Angle declined to accept the Hall of Fame honor, stating he hadn't earned it and wanted to achieve more in TNA. Later that night, he was defeated by Roode after a rough landing during a suplex. Their rivalry continued, with Angle suffering (kayfabe) injuries, including concussions, amnesia and issues with his knee. Despite being cleared later, Angle was attacked again by Roode and lost further matches in the ongoing TNA World Title tournament due to Roode's interference. At Genesis, Angle defeated Roode in a steel cage match to end their feud.

In early 2014, Angle began a feud with Ethan Carter III (EC3), who injured his knee during an attack. Angle officially accepted his Hall of Fame induction on February 27, but the ceremony was interrupted by EC3. At Sacrifice, Angle teamed with Willow to defeat EC3 and Rockstar Spud. In May, Angle underwent ACL surgery and was sidelined.

While still not medically cleared to wrestle, on June 20, 2014, Angle was appointed (kayfabe) Executive Director of Wrestling Operations by TNA's board. During this time, he reinstated Bobby Roode, who had been indefinitely suspended by MVP, and officially retired the inactive TNA Television Championship. On October 29 (taped September 18), he served as special referee for the TNA World Championship match between Roode and Lashley.

Around the expiration of his TNA contract in September 2014, Angle reached out to WWE about a return, but was reportedly turned down. He later re-signed with TNA on a part-time deal, before being offered and signing a full-time contract.

==== Final feuds and departure (2015–2016) ====
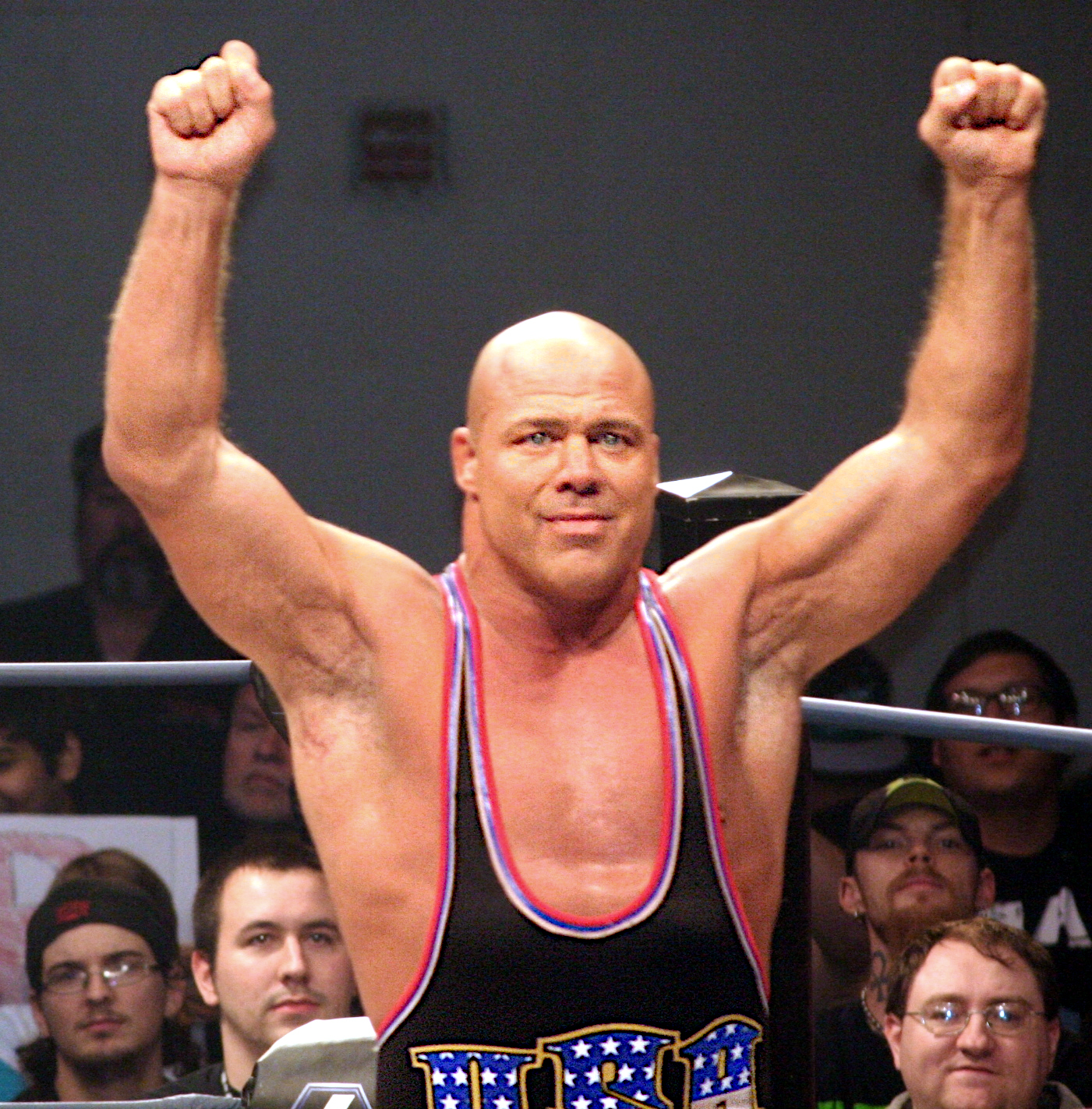
Angle at Bound for Glory in October 2015

Angle returned to in-ring action on January 7, 2015, during TNA’s debut on Destination America. On March 20 (taped January 31), he defeated Lashley to win the TNA World Heavyweight Championship for a record sixth time. He successfully defended the title against Eric Young, Lashley, Rockstar Spud, and Austin Aries, before losing it to EC3 on the July 1 episode (taped June 25) of Impact Wrestling. He failed to regain the title in a rematch on the July 8 of Impact Wrestling.

At Bound for Glory on October 4, Angle defeated Eric Young. The following month, he announced his departure from TNA after the upcoming UK tour in early 2016. Angle’s "Farewell Tour" included matches against TNA 's top stars. He defeated Drew Galloway on January 12, 2016, but lost to Matt Hardy in a title match on February 2 and to Galloway in a rematch on February 9. After defeating Bobby Roode on March 1, Angle wrestled his final TNA match on March 8, 2016, losing to Lashley.

=== Japanese promotions (2007–2009) ===
On February 18, 2007, Angle made his debut in New Japan Pro-Wrestling (NJPW), teaming with former IWGP Heavyweight Champion Yuji Nagata to defeat fellow TNA wrestler Travis Tomko and fellow WWE alumnus Giant Bernard.

Angle was booked to face Brock Lesnar in a champion-versus-champion match for the Inoki Genome Federation (IGF) on June 29, 2007, and defeated him by submission to win the IWGP Heavyweight Championship. Angle then challenged Lesnar to an MMA fight. On December 19, 2007, Angle defended the IWGP title successfully against Kendo Kashin.

On January 4, 2008, Angle made his third successful IWGP Heavyweight Championship defense when he defeated Yuji Nagata at the NJPW supershow Wrestle Kingdom II in Tokyo Dome by forcing Nagata to submit to the ankle lock. On February 17, 2008, Angle lost the IWGP title to the NJPW-recognized champion Shinsuke Nakamura in a unification match. He returned in August during the G1 Climax, in two special tag matches with A.J. Styles as his main opponent. In those matches Shinsuke Nakamura and Masahiro Chono became Angle's partners while Hiroshi Tanahashi and Shinjiro Otani became Styles' partners. Angle's team won both matches.

He returned on January 4, 2009, at Wrestle Kingdom III in Tokyo Dome in a special eight-man tag match, where he, Kevin Nash, Chono, and Riki Choshu faced Great Bash Heel (Giant Bernard, Karl Anderson, Takashi Iizuka, and Tomohiro Ishii), with Angle getting the win for his team. Angle then went on to defeat Bernard in a singles match at New Japan's ISM tour on February 15. After Hiroshi Tanahashi retained the IWGP Heavyweight Championship against Nakamura in the main event, Angle challenged him for the title, which Tanahashi accepted. Tanahashi defeated Angle on April 5 at New Japan's Resolution '09 to retain the title.

=== Mexico (2012) ===
Angle made his debut for Mexican promotion company AAA on August 5, 2012, at Triplemanía XX, where he teamed up with Jeff Jarrett as Team Dorian Roldán in a hair-vs.-hair match, where they faced Team Joaquín Roldán (Electroshock and L.A. Park), with the Roldáns' hairs on the line. Electroshock won the match for his team by pinning Angle, forcing Dorian to have his head shaved bald. However, after the match, Angle, Jarrett, and Dorian overpowered the winners and shaved Joaquín bald.

=== Independent circuit (2016–2017) ===
On March 20, 2016, Angle competed for URFight, going against former rival and fellow WWE alumnus Rey Mysterio in a losing effort in a two-falls match that saw Angle as a heel. Angle wrestled for Revolution Pro Wrestling on June 12, where he defeated Zack Sabre Jr. On August 27, Angle lost to Cody Rhodes at Northeast Wrestling's Wrestling Under the Stars in Wappingers Falls, New York. Angle defeated Joe Hendry at the October 6 What Culture Pro Wrestling video tapings. On November 20, 2016, Angle lost to Joe Coffey at Insane Championship Wrestling's Fear & Loathing IX. On February 12, 2017, Angle defeated Alberto el Patrón at WCPW True Destiny in his final match in the United Kingdom.

On March 3, 2017, Angle appeared for Northeast Wrestling in Connecticut, where he was defeated by Cody Rhodes in a steel cage match. This was his last match on the independent circuit.

=== Return to WWE ===
==== Hall of Famer and Raw General Manager (2017–2018) ====
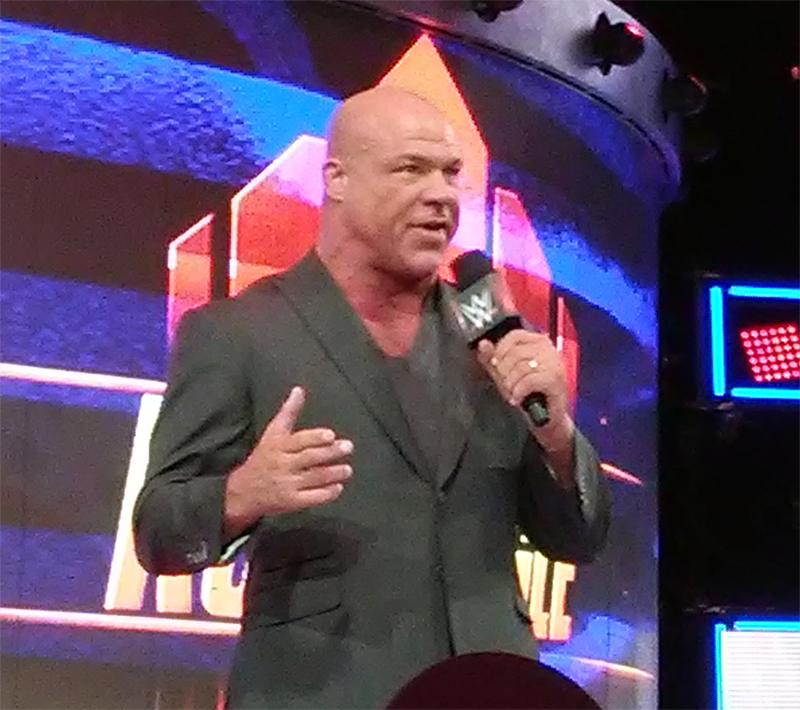
Angle as Raw General Manager in July 2017

On January 16, 2017, WWE announced that Angle would be inducted into the WWE Hall of Fame. On March 16, WWE revealed that his long-time rival John Cena would induct Angle at the Hall of Fame ceremony. On the April 3 episode of Raw after WrestleMania 33, Angle made his first WWE appearance in nearly 11 years, after Mr. McMahon appointed Angle as the new general manager of Raw. He was included into a storyline where Jason Jordan was his son.

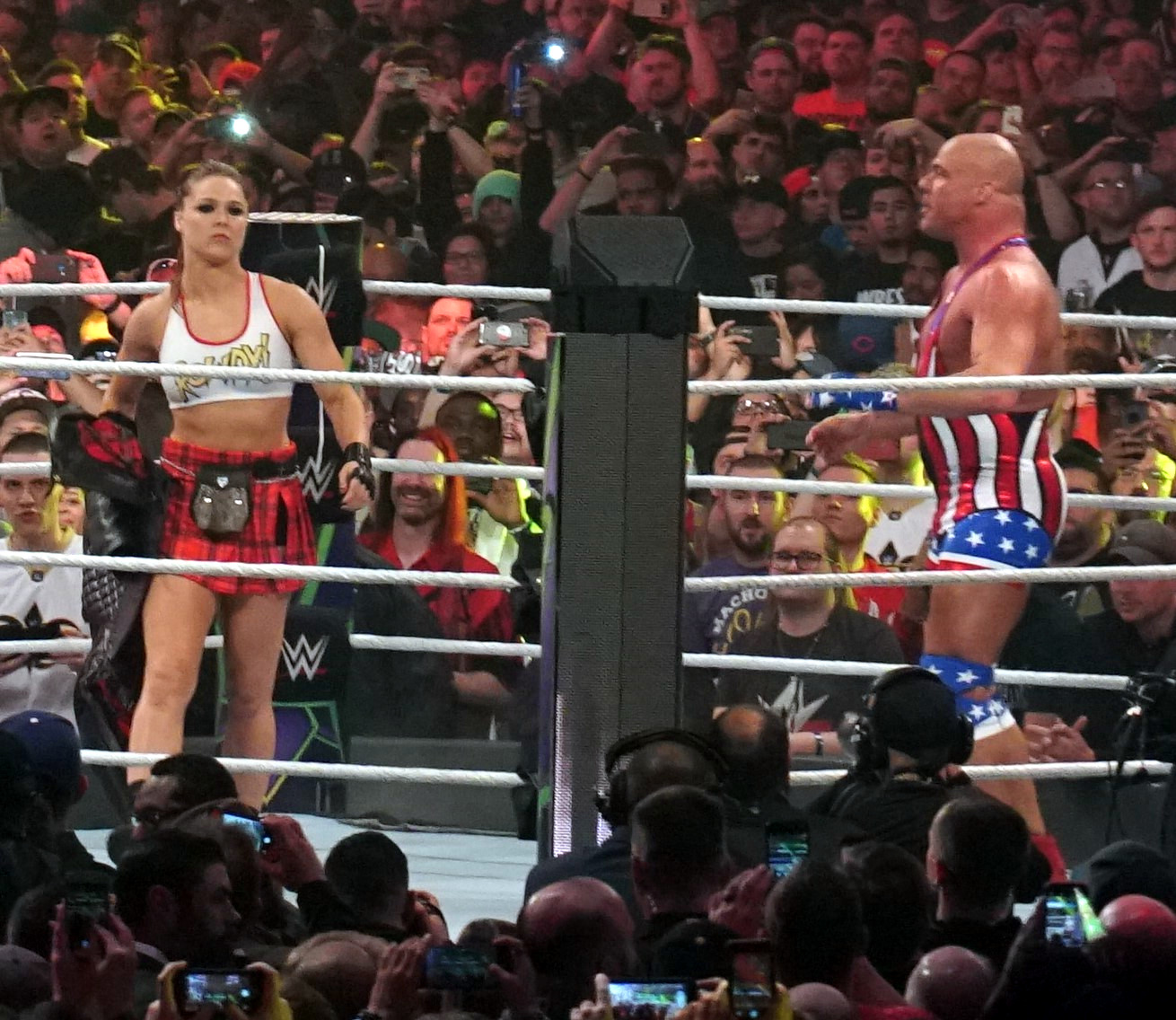
Angle at WrestleMania 34 with Ronda Rousey

At TLC: Tables, Ladders & Chairs, Angle has his first match with WWE in 11 years when he teamed with The Shield (Dean Ambrose and Seth Rollins) to defeat the team of Braun Strowman, Kane, The Miz, Sheamus, and Cesaro in a TLC match. On the October 30 episode of Raw, while addressing the fans, commissioner Stephanie McMahon confronted Angle, announcing that Angle would be the team captain of Team Raw at Survivor Series, adding that if Team Raw would lose, Angle would be fired. At the event, Angle's teammate Triple H attacked him, leading to his elimination by Shane McMahon; however, Team Raw still went on to win the match. At the Elimination Chamber, Angle, along with Stephanie McMahon and Triple H, was present when Ronda Rousey signed her Raw contract, where Angle brought up the confrontation that Stephanie McMahon and Triple H had with Rousey and The Rock at WrestleMania 31 and that they both want to manipulate her. This caused Rousey to put Triple H through a table and be slapped by Stephanie McMahon before signing her contract. The following night on Raw, Angle claimed the allegations he made were false, to keep his job, before being attacked by Triple H. As a result, the following week, Angle scheduled himself to team with Rousey against Triple H and Stephanie McMahon in a mixed tag team match at WrestleMania 34, which Angle and Rousey won. Angle participated in the 50-man Royal Rumble match at the Greatest Royal Rumble event later that month. He entered at number 16 and eliminated Bo Dallas, Primo Colón, and Dolph Ziggler before being eliminated by Elias. Following WrestleMania, Angle found himself in a power struggle over control of Raw, when the McMahon family appointed Baron Corbin as the constable of Monday Nights on the June 4 episode of Raw. This continued until the August 20 episode, when Stephanie McMahon sent Angle on "vacation" before announcing that Corbin would be acting general manager in Angle's absence.

==== Final matches and retirement (2018–2019) ====
On the October 8, 2018, episode of Raw, Angle made a surprise return, disguised as "The Conquistador", winning a battle royal after last eliminating Baron Corbin to qualify for the WWE World Cup at Crown Jewel. At the event, Angle was defeated by Dolph Ziggler in the first round of the WWE World Cup Tournament. On November 5, Angle competed in his first match on Raw since 2006, for a spot in the Survivor Series men's tag team match, losing to Drew McIntyre, with McIntyre using Angle's own ankle lock finishing maneuver to make him submit. Angle returned at TLC on December 16 to help Braun Strowman, along with Apollo Crews, Finn Bálor, Bobby Roode, Chad Gable, defeat Baron Corbin to strip him of authoritative power. The next night on Raw, Angle, along with Crews, Roode, and Gable, easily defeated Corbin in a no-disqualification handicap match to prevent him from being the permanent general manager of Raw. At the 2019 Royal Rumble on January 27, 2019, Angle entered the match at number four but was eliminated by Shinsuke Nakamura.

On the March 11, 2019, episode of Raw, Angle announced he would retire at WrestleMania 35 and chose Baron Corbin as his final opponent at the event. Over the following weeks, Angle embarked on a "Farewell Tour", facing several handpicked opponents, including Apollo Crews, Chad Gable, Samoa Joe, and AJ Styles. At WrestleMania 35, Angle lost to Corbin in his final match. Afterwards, Angle transitioned to a backstage role as a producer. Despite working with Corbin, Angle asked Vince McMahon to wrestle John Cena in his retirement match, but McMahon declined his petition. Angle also pointed that he decided to stay retired after he watched his last matches with WWE and saw his decreasing mobility and athleticism.

==== Sporadic appearances (2019–present) ====
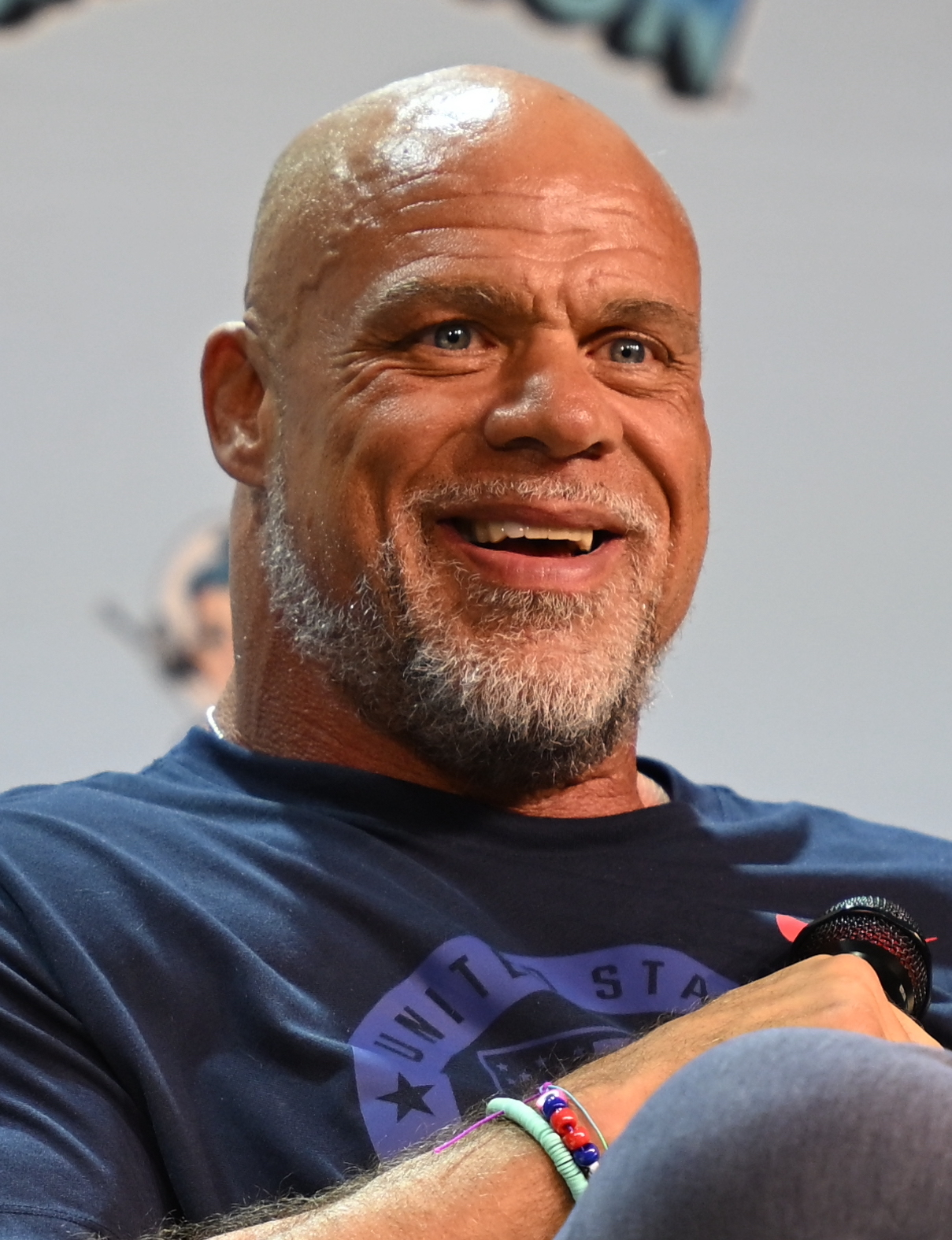
Angle at GalaxyCon Raleigh in 2024

Since 2019, Angle has made appearances on WWE programs, like Raw Reunion or the August 5 episode of Raw in his hometown of Pittsburgh, where he was the special guest referee for a match between Drew McIntyre and Cedric Alexander. On April 15, 2020, Angle was released from his WWE contract as part of budget cuts stemming from the COVID-19 pandemic.

On the May 27, 2020, episode of NXT, Angle served as the special guest referee in a steel cage match between Matt Riddle and Timothy Thatcher. He appeared again two days later on the May 29 episode of SmackDown to announce the arrival of Matt Riddle to the brand. In an interview with CBR.com, Angle revealed that WWE offered him a new deal to come back under the role of Matt Riddle's manager, but he turned it down in order to focus on his health and his nutrition business.

Angle would appear on the August 29, 2022 episode of Raw, which took place in his hometown of Pittsburgh, on the December 9 episode of SmackDown, where he celebrated his 54th birthday, After the show went off the air, Rey Mysterio led the superstars and audience in singing "Happy Birthday" to Angle. or the Raw is XXX on January 23, 2023, in a segment with D-Generation X.

== Professional wrestling style and persona ==
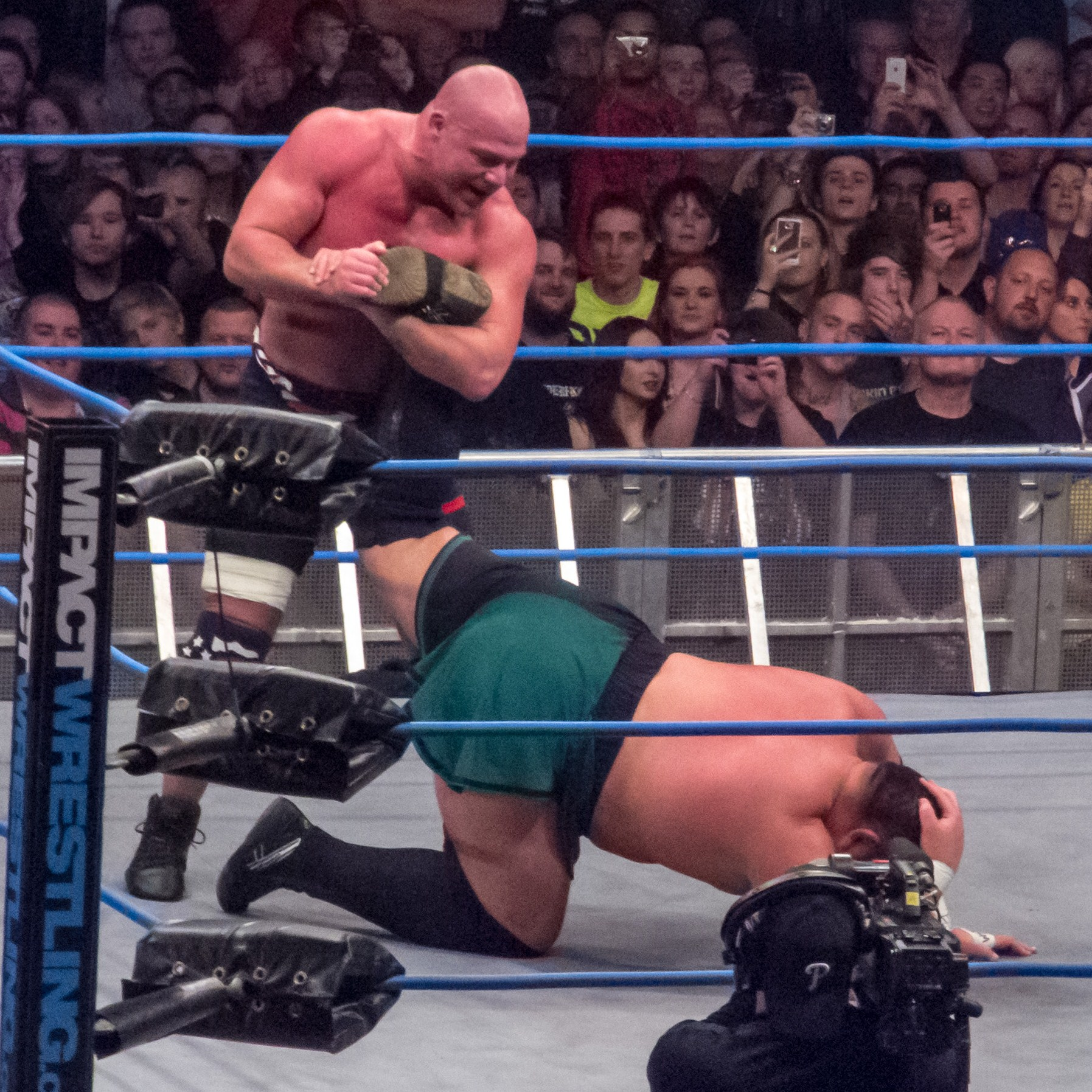
Angle applying the Ankle Lock on Samoa Joe

When Angle began to train as a professional wrestler, he was asked to not watch old tapes, since the style had changed during the Attitude Era and the matches were more aggressive. Instead, he learned by watching then-current wrestlers such as Stone Cold Steve Austin, Triple H, or The Rock. Angle said his match against The Rock at No Way Out 2001 was the transition between the "funny, goofy Kurt Angle to a more serious competitor", including more offense.

Angle's Olympic gold medal (and World Wrestling Championships gold medal) has frequently been incorporated into his professional wrestling persona. His personality varies depending on his alignment as a face or heel. As a face, Angle usually performs as a role model; but as a heel arrogantly uses his achievements to insult other people. He mixes aspects from his amateur wrestling background with his in-ring work, performing various suplexes, including the belly-to-back, German, and belly-to-belly, as well as submissions, such as the rear naked choke or the triangle choke. He primarily performs two finishing maneuvers to end his matches: an Olympic slam, dubbed "Angle Slam", and an ankle lock.

During Angle's entrances in WWE, it is common for fans to chant "you suck!" to the tune of his entrance music. The chants originated during Angle's feud with The Rock in February 2001, but gained popularity during his feud with Edge in 2002. The chants have become a trademark of Angle's persona, regardless if he is a face or heel. The theme song was later adopted by UFC fighter Colby Covington.

== Video games ==
Angle appeared in every WWE/F video game from 2000's WWF Royal Rumble up to WWE SmackDown vs. Raw 2007, released in 2006. After an eleven-year absence, Angle made his return to WWE video games as a playable character in WWE 2K18 (as downloadable content), before subsequently appearing in WWE 2K19, WWE 2K20, and returning in WWE 2K23, WWE 2K24 and WWE 2K25. He also appears in TNA Impact!, TNA Wrestling, and TNA Wrestling Impact!.

== Acting career ==
Angle expressed interest in pursuing an acting career after retiring from professional wrestling. In 2008, he made his film debut as a racist prison deputy in the short film Chains. In 2009, he played serial killer Brad Mayfield in the film End Game. On a third-season episode of Pros vs. Joes, he was teamed up with Jimmy Smith and Kendall Gill against the Joes. Angle appeared in the "Car Wreck Vanish" episode of Criss Angel Mindfreak. He played Russian MMA champion Koba (in a non-speaking role) in the 2011 film Warrior, and starred as town sheriff Will Logan in the film River of Darkness.

On the Right After Wrestling program on Sirius Satellite Radio, Angle revealed he would become a part-time wrestler after his contract expired in 2011 to focus on Angle Foods and his acting career. In the 2013 film Pro Wrestlers vs Zombies, he plays himself as both a human and a zombie. Angle also had a small role in the 2014 cult-film Sharknado 2: The Second One and in the 2014 romantic-comedy film Not Cool. He appeared in the film The Last Witch Hunter. He also made a cameo appearance in the movie Pain and Gain, in which he brawls with Dwayne Johnson's character in a prison fight. Angle appeared on an episode of Duck Dynasty in February 2016. From 2018 to 2019 Angle provided the voice of Chip Damage on the Cartoon Network show OK K.O.! Let's Be Heroes.

=== Filmography ===
Film
Year	Title	Role	Notes
2009	End Game	Brad Mayfield	
2009	Chains	Deputy	Short film
2011	Dylan Dog: Dead of Night	Wolfgang	
2011	River of Darkness	Sheriff Will Logan	
2011	Waking Up	"Crush" Carlisle	Short film
2011	Warrior	"The Great" Koba	
2012	Beyond the Mat	Coach Kamen	Still not released
2012	Death from Above	Thule	
2012	Drummer for the Mob	FBI Agent	
2012	Olympic Trials with Kurt Angle	Himself	Funny or Die short
2013	Pain & Gain	Benjamin Rowe	
2013	Horse Cops	Eli Paste	
2013	Pro Wrestlers vs Zombies	Himself	
2014	Sharknado 2: The Second One	Fire Chief	
2014	Not Cool	Security Guard	
2015	The Last Witch Hunter	Bodyguard	

Television
Year	Title	Role	Notes
1997	Fox 53 Ten O'Clock News	Himself	Sportscaster: "The Angle on Sports"
2000	SMTV Live	Himself	
2001	The Weakest Link	Himself	
2007	Inside MMA	Himself	Season 1, episodes 10 and 11
2008	Pros vs. Joes	Himself	Season 3, episode 1
2009	Criss Angel Mindfreak	Himself	Episode: "Car Wreck Vanish"
2011	Extreme Makeover: Home Edition	Himself	Episode: "The Lampe Family"
2013	Baal Veer	Himself	
2016	Duck Dynasty	Himself	Episode: "Van He'llsing"
2016	Those Who Can't	Coach Joe Donnelly	Episode: "A New Dog in the Yard"
2018–2019	OK K.O.! Let's Be Heroes	Chip Damage	Voice; 6 episodes
2021	Ryan's Mystery Playdate	Himself	Episode: "Ryan's Super Tough Playdate"

== Other endeavors ==
In 1996, Angle became a marketing representative for Protos Foods, the manufacturers of OSTRIM, an ostrich-meat-based foodstuff. In 1997, he worked for a year as a sportscaster on Pittsburgh's local Fox affiliate WPGH-TV. He also did a commercial for Pittsburgh-based pizza chain Pizza Outlet. Both Angle's pizza commercial and his time on WPGH-TV would be referenced on WWE television (the latter through the WWE Network show Ride Along), and his time with WPGH-TV would also make him an alumnus of WPGH-TV parent Sinclair Broadcast Group without having ever appeared for Sinclair-owned wrestling promotion Ring of Honor.

Angle is a longtime fan of MMA, and has occasionally talked about his desire to compete. UFC president Dana White stated that Angle was in talks to appear as a heavyweight contestant on the 10th season of The Ultimate Fighter, but did not meet the medical requirements. Angle signed with Bellator MMA on October 28, 2015. He attended a fan convention on November 6, the eve of Bellator 145, then joined the commentary booth the next night, during the Bobby Lashley vs. James Thompson match, where he teased possibly fighting for the promotion himself.

Angle's book, It's True It's True, was released on September 18, 2001. In 2008, Angle was selected to be featured on the cover for metal band Emmure's second album The Respect Issue, where he is depicted on the front and back covers for the record, as well as on the inlay.

From January 2021 to January 2024, Angle co-hosted a podcast called The Kurt Angle Show with Conrad Thompson.

Angle was hired as a sports analyst for Real American Freestyle in July 2025. Angle owns part of the company.

== Personal life ==
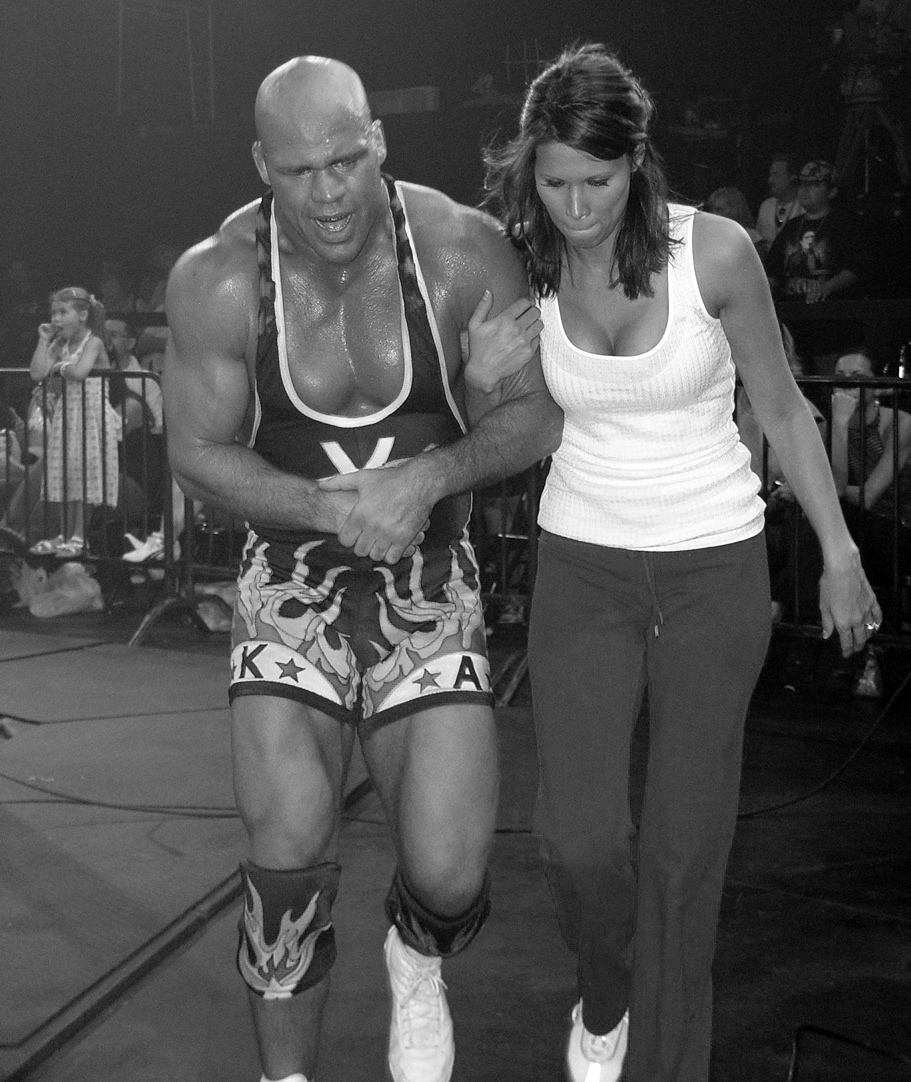
Angle being helped by his then-wife Karen, with their daughter watching at ringside (far back)

Angle married Karen Smedley on December 19, 1998. They have two children together. In September 2008, it was reported that Karen had filed for divorce from Kurt. In 2010, it was reported that Angle was engaged to actress Giovanna Yannotti. Angle and Yannotti were married on July 20, 2012. They have three children, one of whom was adopted.

Angle is a Christian. He supported Marco Rubio in the 2016 Republican Party presidential primaries. He is a supporter of the Pittsburgh Steelers and Pittsburgh Penguins. He also enjoys playing the drums. In July 2015, Angle underwent emergency surgery to remove fluid buildup on his spinal cord after all of his extremities had become numb. A week before this emergency, he had surgery to remove a benign tumor from his neck.

In 2007, Sports Illustrated reported that Angle's name was found in the client database of a Florida wellness center suspected of being a front for distributing performance enhancing drugs. The magazine alleged that Angle had received prescriptions for trenbolone (which is not approved for human use by the Food and Drug Administration) and nandrolone, both anabolic steroids. Angle denied the allegations, commenting that his neck issues were well documented. Angle only failed a drugs test under WWE's Wellness Policy because his prescription for nandrolone had expired. Angle has been open about struggles with addiction to prescription pain medication. He claims that he developed an addiction to pain killers in 2003, and that his addictions got so out of control that at one point he was taking up to 65 extra-strength Vicodin per day. Angle states that after completing rehabilitation following a 2013 DUI arrest, he has been clean and sober.

=== Charitable work ===
In 2003 Angle helped fellow US wrestler Teague Moore raise funds for his training and bid for the 2004 Olympics.

In 2016 Angle launched his own app called the Angle Strong. The app aimed at helping people in recovery of drug addiction, providing check-ins, reminders, care-manager support, and loved-one notifications. The app had a chat room where people could talk to other recovering addicts.

In 2024 Angle began a fundraiser to help support the U.S. men's and women's freestyle Olympic wrestling team, and the U.S. men's Olympic Greco-Roman team. He started the campaign in hopes of making sure the athletes would be able to train full-time and not have to worry about working during their training. He also worked with USA Wrestling to raise funds to help give female wrestlers a greater ability to compete at all levels.

Angle also does work with the Tunnels to Towers Foundation, which helps families of fallen first responders and military servicemen. Angle has stated that it is a personal issue to him as his father, who was in the U.S. Army Reserves, was killed in a construction accident.

In April 2026, Angle appeared in a video discussing autistic wrestling fans, saying he believes "they are some of the most passionate wrestling fans"..

=== Legal issues ===
In September 2007, Angle was arrested by the Moon Township Police Department in Moon Township, Pennsylvania, a part of the Greater Pittsburgh area, on a DUI charge, after police received a report of an erratic driver leaving a local bar. Angle was charged with driving under the influence and careless driving after police traced the description of the car to his home. Angle was later found not guilty on those charges when the complaining witness was unable to corroborate her story.

On August 15, 2009, Angle was again arrested by the Moon Township Police Department. His girlfriend stated that she had filed a protection from abuse (PFA) order and that he was stalking her in the Robinson area. Angle was charged with "driving while operating privilege is suspended, prohibited acts-possession, harassment and prohibited acts". Hygetropin, a human growth hormone, was found in his car; Angle maintained that he had a prescription for the drug. On September 15, a District Court judge dropped the harassment, suspended license, and drug charges against Angle. On November 9, the PFA charges were dropped after he and former girlfriend Trenesha Biggers reached an agreement to avoid contact with each other.

On March 25, 2011, Angle was arrested by North Dakota Highway Patrol officers in Thompson, North Dakota, and charged with "being in control of a motor vehicle while intoxicated", after failing a field sobriety test. Angle later pleaded guilty to the charges and was sentenced on April 20 to one year of unsupervised probation, a chemical dependency evaluation, a $250 fine, $225 in court fees, and a ten-day suspended sentence.

Angle was arrested in the early morning of September 4, 2011, by Virginia State Troopers for allegedly driving under the influence. Angle was placed in Warren County Jail, before posting $2,000 bail and being released. State police revealed that Angle's initial breath test at the scene, where he was stopped by police, showed a blood-alcohol concentration of 0.091 percent, which was above the legal limit of 0.08 percent. The test was later ruled not admissible; and when a second test, taken at the police station, showed a blood-alcohol concentration of 0.06, the DUI charge was dropped. Angle was still charged with reckless driving. On November 8, 2011, Angle entered a plea of no contest and was fined $1,500.

On August 2, 2013, Angle was arrested by Texas Highway Patrol officers and charged with driving while intoxicated in Decatur, Texas. Later that day, Angle announced he was immediately entering a drug rehabilitation center.

== Championships and accomplishments ==
=== Folkstyle/freestyle wrestling ===
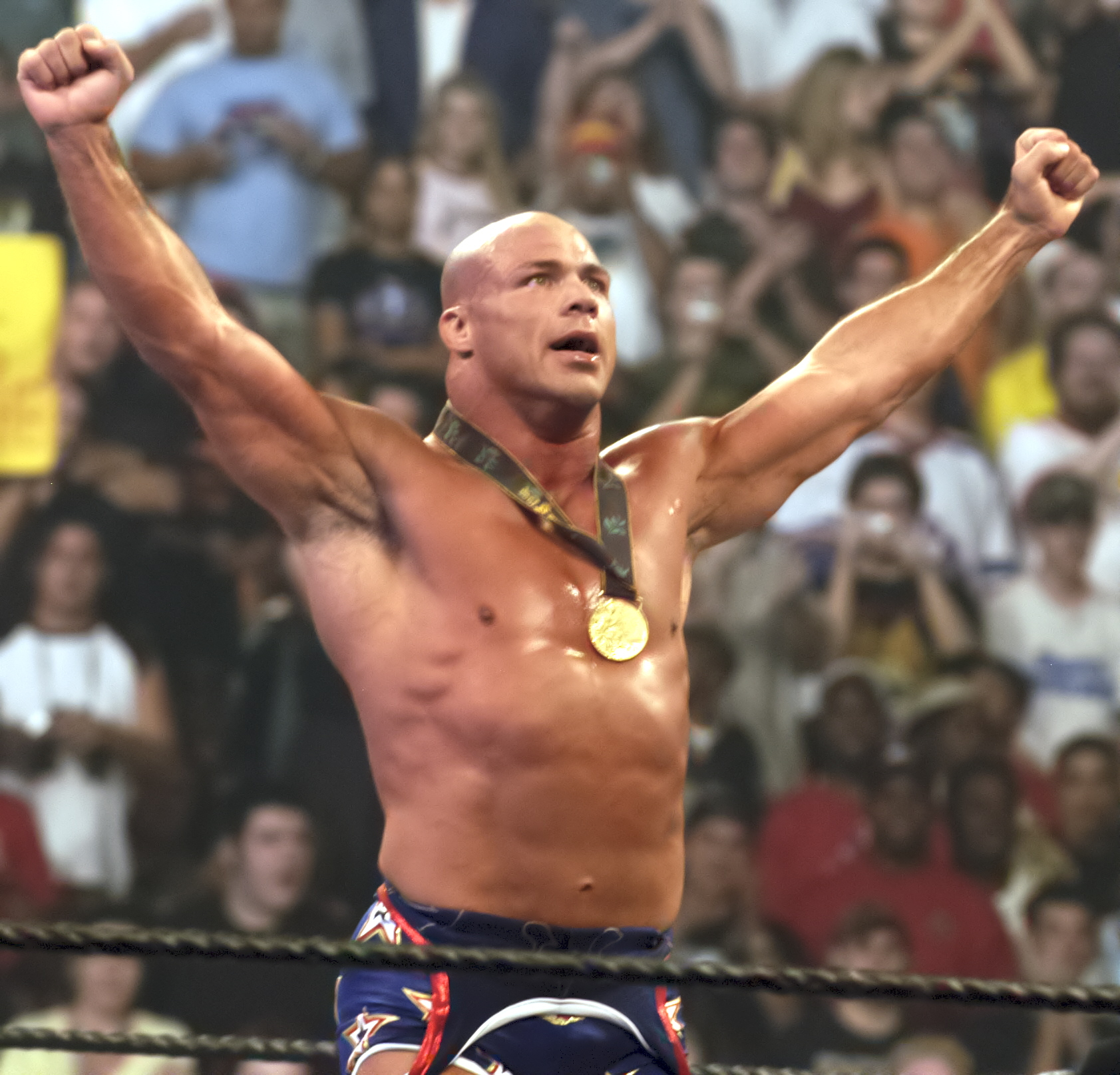
Angle is a 1996 Olympic Gold Medal winner in freestyle wrestling

- Canadian Cup Championship
  - Winner (1990)
- Collegiate/High School
  - Clarion University Freshman of the Year (1988)
  - Pennsylvania State Wrestling Champion (1987)
- International Federation of Associated Wrestling Styles
  - FILA Junior World Freestyle Champion (1988)
  - FILA World Championships gold medal in freestyle wrestling (100 kg) (1995)
- International Sports Hall of Fame
  - Class of 2016
- National Amateur Wrestling Hall of Fame
  - National Wrestling Hall of Fame Distinguished Member (Class of 2001)
- National Collegiate Athletic Association
  - NCAA Division I All-American (1990–1992)
  - NCAA Division I Heavyweight Champion (1990, 1992)
- Olympic Games
  - Summer Olympics gold medal in freestyle wrestling (heavyweight) (1996)
- USA Wrestling
  - USA Junior Freestyle Champion (1987)
  - USA Senior Freestyle Champion (1995, 1996)
  - USA Wrestling Hall of Fame (Class of 2001)
- Clarion University of Pennsylvania
  - Athletics Hall of Fame (Class of 1998)

=== Professional wrestling ===
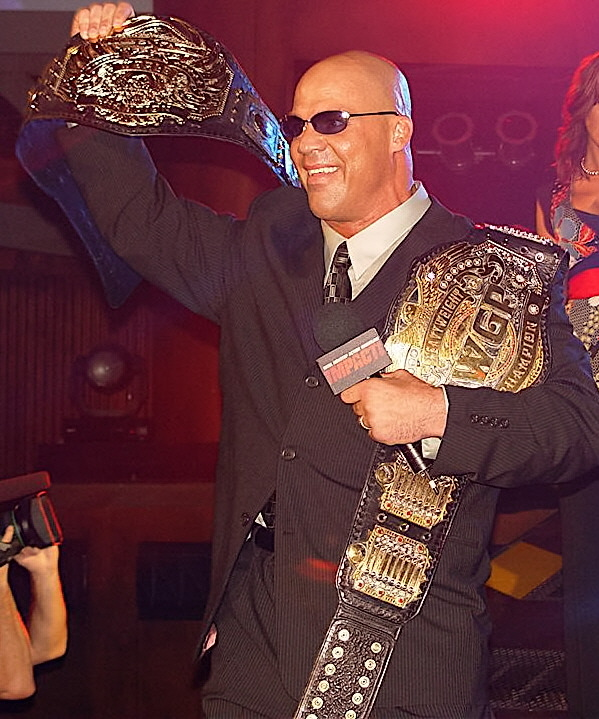
Angle is a record six-time TNA World Heavyweight Champion (right hand), and former IWGP Heavyweight Champion (as recognized by IGF)

- The Baltimore Sun
  - Best Worker of the Decade (2010)
- Cauliflower Alley Club
  - Future Legend Award (2000)
  - Lou Thesz/Art Abrams Award (2024)
- Inoki Genome Federation
  - IWGP Heavyweight Championship (1 time)
- George Tragos/Lou Thesz Professional Wrestling Hall of Fame
  - Class of 2012
  - Special honoree (2015)
- International Professional Wrestling Hall of Fame
  - Class of 2024
- Memphis Wrestling Hall of Fame
  - Class of 2021
- Power Pro Wrestling
  - PPW Heavyweight Championship (1 time)
- Pro Wrestling Illustrated
  - Comeback of the Year (2003)
  - Feud of the Year (2000) vs. Triple H
  - Feud of the Year (2003) vs. Brock Lesnar
  - Feud of the Year (2007) vs. Samoa Joe
  - Inspirational Wrestler of the Year (2001)
  - Match of the Year (2003) vs. Brock Lesnar in an Iron Man match on SmackDown! on September 16
  - Match of the Year (2005) vs. Shawn Michaels at WrestleMania 21
  - Most Hated Wrestler of the Year (2000)
  - Most Popular Wrestler of the Year (2003)
  - Rookie of the Year (2000)
  - Wrestler of the Year (2003)
  - Ranked No. 1 of the top 500 singles wrestlers in the PWI 500 in 2001
- SoCal Uncensored
  - Match of the Year (2000) vs. Christopher Daniels on September 13, 2000 (Ultimate Pro Wrestling)
- Sports Illustrated
  - Ranked No. 12 of the 20 Greatest WWE Wrestlers Of All Time
- Total Nonstop Action Wrestling
  - TNA World Heavyweight Championship (6 times, inaugural)
  - TNA X Division Championship (1 time)
  - TNA World Tag Team Championship (2 times) – with Sting (1) (Note: Angle originally won both tag team championship belts from solo championship holder Samoa Joe. Sting won a four-way match to win the other share of the title, and joined Angle in his reign midway through.) and A.J. Styles (1)
  - King of the Mountain (2007, 2009)
  - Second Triple Crown Champion
  - TNA Hall of Fame (2013)
  - TNA Year End Awards (5 times)
    - Feud of the year (2006, 2007) vs. Samoa Joe
    - Match of the Year (2007) vs Sting at Bound for Glory
    - Memorable Moment of the Year (2006) Debut at No Surrender
    - Who to Watch in 2007 (2006)
- Wrestling Observer Newsletter
  - Best Gimmick (2000)
  - Best on Interviews (2002)
  - Best Technical Wrestler (2002)
  - Feud of the Year (2003) vs. Brock Lesnar
  - Match of the Year (2002) with Chris Benoit vs. Edge and Rey Mysterio at No Mercy on October 20
  - Most Improved (2000)
  - Most Outstanding Wrestler (2001–2003)
  - Readers' Favorite Wrestler (2002–2003)
  - Wrestler of the Year (2002)
  - Wrestler of the Decade (2000–2009)
  - Wrestling Observer Newsletter Hall of Fame (Class of 2004)
- World Wrestling Federation/World Wrestling Entertainment/WWE
  - WWF/E Championship (4 times)
  - WCW Championship (1 time) (Note: Won during the Invasion storyline.)
  - World Heavyweight Championship (1 time)
  - WWF Intercontinental Championship (1 time)
  - WWF European Championship (1 time)
  - WWF Hardcore Championship (1 time)
  - WCW United States Championship (1 time)
  - WWE Tag Team Championship (1 time, inaugural) – with Chris Benoit
  - King of the Ring (2000)
  - 10th Triple Crown Champion
  - Fifth Grand Slam Champion
  - WWE Tag Team Championship Tournament (2002) – with Chris Benoit
  - WWE Hall of Fame (Class of 2017)

== World Championships/Olympic Games matches ==
Res.	Record	Opponent	Score	Date	Event	Location
1996 Olympic Games (gold) at −100kg
Win	9–0	(Iran) Abbas Jadidi	1–1	July 31, 1996	1996 Olympic Games	(United States) Atlanta, Georgia
Win	8–0	(Kyrgyzstan) Konstantin Aleksandrov	4–1	July 31, 1996	1996 Olympic Games	(United States) Atlanta, Georgia
Win	7–0	(Russia) Sagid Murtazaliev	4–3	July 31, 1996	1996 Olympic Games	(United States) Atlanta, Georgia
Win	6–0	(Cuba) Wilfredo Morales	2–0	July 30, 1996	1996 Olympic Games	(United States) Atlanta, Georgia
Win	5–0	(Mongolia) Dolgorsürengiin Sumyaabazar	4–0	July 30, 1996	1996 Olympic Games	(United States) Atlanta, Georgia
1995 World Championship (gold) at −100kg
Win	4–0	(Germany) Arawat Sabejew	Referee Decision	August 13, 1995	1995 World Championships	(United States) Atlanta, Georgia
Win	3–0	(Canada) Oleg Ladik	Referee Decision	August 13, 1995	1995 World Championships	(United States) Atlanta, Georgia
Win	2–0	(Hungary) József Glazer	3–0	August 13, 1995	1995 World Championships	(United States) Atlanta, Georgia
Win	1–0	(Turkey) Kenan Şimşek	2–0	August 13, 1995	1995 World Championships	(United States) Atlanta, Georgia

== Luchas de Apuestas record ==
Winner (wager)	Loser (wager)	Location	Event	Date	Notes
Edge (hair)	Kurt Angle (hair)	Nashville, Tennessee	Judgment Day	May 19, 2002	

== Sources ==
- "2007 Wrestling Almanac & Book of Facts". Wrestling's Historical Cards. Kappa Publishing. 2007.
- "Pro Wrestling Illustrated, May 2006". Arena Reports. Kappa Publishing. May 2006.
- Angle, Kurt (2002). It's True! It's True!. HarperEntertainment. ISBN 978-0-06-109893-2.
- Loverro, Thom (2006). The Rise & Fall of ECW: Extreme Championship Wrestling. WWE Books. ISBN 978-1-4165-1058-1.
