= Wrestling at the 1996 Summer Olympics – Men's freestyle 100 kg =

Men's freestyle 100 kg at the Games of the XXVI Olympiad
- Venue: Georgia World Congress Center
- Dates: 30–31 July 1996
- Competitors: 19 from 19 nations

Medalists
1st place, gold medalist(s)		Kurt Angle	United States
2nd place, silver medalist(s)		Abbas Jadidi	Iran
3rd place, bronze medalist(s)		Arawat Sabejew	Germany

The Men's Freestyle 100 kilograms at the 1996 Summer Olympics as part of the wrestling program were held at the Georgia World Congress Center from 30 to 31 July. The gold and silver medalists were determined by the final match of the main single-elimination bracket. The losers advanced to the repechage. These matches determined the bronze medalist for the event.

== Results ==
Legend

- WO — Won by walkover

=== Round 1 ===
	Score		CP
1/16 finals
Sergey Kovalevsky (BLR)	0–3	Arawat Sabejew (GER)	0–3 PO
Kim Tae-woo (KOR)	0–6	Wilfredo Morales (CUB)	0–3 PO
Dolgorsürengiin Sumiyaabazar (MGL)	0–4	Kurt Angle (USA)	0–3 PO
Konstantin Aleksandrov (KGZ)	2–1	Milan Mazáč (SVK)	3–1 PP
Daniel Sánchez (PUR)	0–8 Fall	Arvi Aavik (EST)	0–4 TO
Leri Khabelov (RUS)	2–0	Zaza Tkeshelashvili (GEO)	3–0 PO
Davud Magomedov (AZE)	0–4	Abbas Jadidi (IRI)	0–3 PO
Shkëlqim Troplini (ALB)	0–7 Fall	Oleg Ladik (CAN)	0–4 TO
Ben Vincent (AUS)	0–11	Marek Garmulewicz (POL)	0–4 ST
Sagid Murtazaliev (UKR)		Bye	

=== Round 2 ===
	Score		CP
1/8 finals
Sagid Murtazaliev (UKR)	13–3	Arawat Sabejew (GER)	4–1 SP
Wilfredo Morales (CUB)	0–2	Kurt Angle (USA)	0–3 PO
Konstantin Aleksandrov (KGZ)	1–0	Arvi Aavik (EST)	3–0 PO
Leri Khabelov (RUS)	0–4	Abbas Jadidi (IRI)	0–3 PO
Oleg Ladik (CAN)	0–3	Marek Garmulewicz (POL)	0–3 PO
Repechage
Sergey Kovalevsky (BLR)	3–1	Kim Tae-woo (KOR)	3–1 PP
Dolgorsürengiin Sumiyaabazar (MGL)	4–2	Milan Mazáč (SVK)	3–1 PP
Daniel Sánchez (PUR)	2–3	Zaza Tkeshelashvili (GEO)	1–3 PP
Davud Magomedov (AZE)	10–0	Shkëlqim Troplini (ALB)	4–0 ST
Ben Vincent (AUS)		Bye	

=== Round 3 ===
	Score		CP
Quarterfinals
Sagid Murtazaliev (UKR)	3–4	Kurt Angle (USA)	1–3 PP
Konstantin Aleksandrov (KGZ)		Bye	
Abbas Jadidi (IRI)		Bye	
Marek Garmulewicz (POL)		Bye	
Repechage
Ben Vincent (AUS)	0–10	Sergey Kovalevsky (BLR)	0–4 ST
Dolgorsürengiin Sumiyaabazar (MGL)	6–2	Zaza Tkeshelashvili (GEO)	3–1 PP
Davud Magomedov (AZE)	1–3	Arawat Sabejew (GER)	1–3 PP
Wilfredo Morales (CUB)	3–1	Arvi Aavik (EST)	3–1 PP
Leri Khabelov (RUS)	WO	Oleg Ladik (CAN)	0–4 PA

=== Round 4 ===
	Score		CP
Semifinals
Kurt Angle (USA)	4–1	Konstantin Aleksandrov (KGZ)	3–1 PP
Abbas Jadidi (IRI)	4–1	Marek Garmulewicz (POL)	3–1 PP
Repechage
Sergey Kovalevsky (BLR)	3–0 Fall	Dolgorsürengiin Sumiyaabazar (MGL)	4–0 TO
Arawat Sabejew (GER)	3–2	Wilfredo Morales (CUB)	3–1 PP
Oleg Ladik (CAN)	1–4	Sagid Murtazaliev (UKR)	1–3 PP

=== Round 5 ===
	Score		CP
Repechage
Sergey Kovalevsky (BLR)	8–4	Sagid Murtazaliev (UKR)	3–1 PP
Arawat Sabejew (GER)		Bye	

=== Round 6 ===
	Score		CP
Repechage
Konstantin Aleksandrov (KGZ)	0–10	Arawat Sabejew (GER)	0–4 ST
Sergey Kovalevsky (BLR)	4–0	Marek Garmulewicz (POL)	3–0 PO

=== Finals ===
	Score		CP
Classification 7th–8th
Sagid Murtazaliev (UKR)	3–1	Oleg Ladik (CAN)	3–1 PP
Classification 5th–6th
Konstantin Aleksandrov (KGZ)	WO	Marek Garmulewicz (POL)	0–4 PA
Bronze medal match
Arawat Sabejew (GER)	7–4	Sergey Kovalevsky (BLR)	3–1 PP
Gold medal match
Kurt Angle (USA)	1–1	Abbas Jadidi (IRI)	3–1 PP

== Final standing ==
Rank	Athlete
1st place, gold medalist(s)	Kurt Angle (USA)
2nd place, silver medalist(s)	Abbas Jadidi (IRI)
3rd place, bronze medalist(s)	Arawat Sabejew (GER)
4	Sergey Kovalevsky (BLR)
5	Marek Garmulewicz (POL)
6	Konstantin Aleksandrov (KGZ)
7	Sagid Murtazaliev (UKR)
8	Oleg Ladik (CAN)
9	Wilfredo Morales (CUB)
10	Dolgorsürengiin Sumiyaabazar (MGL)
11	Davud Magomedov (AZE)
12	Arvi Aavik (EST)
13	Zaza Tkeshelashvili (GEO)
14	Leri Khabelov (RUS)
15	Milan Mazáč (SVK)
16	Daniel Sánchez (PUR)
17	Kim Tae-woo (KOR)
18	Shkëlqim Troplini (ALB)
18	Ben Vincent (AUS)
