= Hye-young =

- Hangul: 혜영
- RR: Hyeyeong
- MR: Hyeyŏng

Hye-young, also spelled Hye-yeong or Hye-yong, is a Korean given name.

People with this name include:

== Entertainers ==
- Lee Hye-young (actress, born 1962), South Korean actress
- Lee Hye-young (actress, born 1971), South Korean actress
- Jung Hye-young (born 1973), South Korean actress
- Ryu Hye-young (born 1991), South Korean actress

== Sportspeople ==
- Hwang Hye-young (born 1966), South Korean badminton player
- Yoon Hye-young (born 1977), South Korean archer
- Son Hye-yong (born 1980), North Korean archer
- Byun Hye-young (born 1983), South Korean swimmer
- Kim Hye-yeong (footballer) (born 1995), South Korean football player

== Others ==
- Pyun Hye-young (born 1972), South Korean writer

== Fictional characters ==
- Artist Hye-young, in 2006 South Korean film Daisy
- Ahn Hye-young, in 2014 South Korean television series The Idle Mermaid
- Byun Hye-young, in 2017 South Korean television series My Father Is Strange
- Lee Hye-yeong, in 2019 South Korean television series Love Alarm

== See also ==
- List of Korean given names
