= Lee Ji-hyun (swimmer, born 1978) =

South Korean swimmer

Personal information
- National team: South Korea
- Born: 27 June 1978 (age 48) Busan, South Korea

Korean name
- Hangul: 이지현
- Hanja: 李枝泫
- RR: I Jihyeon
- MR: I Chihyŏn

Sport
- Sport: Swimming
- Strokes: Backstroke
- College team: Sungshin Women's University
Medal record
Women's swimming
Representing South Korea
Asian Games
Bronze medal – third place	1994 Hiroshima	4×100 m medley

Lee Ji-hyun (Korean: 이지현; born June 27, 1978) is a South Korean former swimmer, who specialized in backstroke events. She won the bronze medal in the medley relay at the 1994 Asian Games, and later represented South Korea at the 1996 Summer Olympics.

Lee started her competitive swimming, as a 16-year-old teen, at the 1994 Asian Games in Hiroshima, Japan. She helped the South Koreans earn a bronze medal in the 4 × 100 m medley relay with a time of 4:22.11.

At the 1996 Summer Olympics, Lee competed for her maiden South Korean squad in two swimming events. In the women's 100 m backstroke, Lee broke a new South Korean record to touch the wall first in 1:03.96, narrowly missing out of the consolation final by seven hundredths of a second (0.07). On the last day of the prelims, Lee posted a lead-off split of 1:04.55 to deliver the South Korean female foursome of Byun Hye-young (breaststroke), Park Woo-hee (butterfly), and Lee Bo-eun (freestyle) a combined time of 4:18.98 for the eighteenth spot in the 4 × 100 m medley relay.

She was educated at Mangmi Girls' Middle School, Busan Sport High School, and Sungshin Women's University.
