= Milan Mazáč =

Slovak wrestler (born 1968)

Personal information
- Nationality: Slovak
- Born: 22 September 1968 (age 58) Bratislava, Czechoslovakia

Sport
- Sport: Wrestling

Milan Mazáč (born 22 September 1968) is a Slovak wrestler. He competed in the men's freestyle 100 kg at the 1996 Summer Olympics.
