= Sergey Kovalevsky =

Belarusian wrestler

Personal information
- Nationality: Belarusian
- Born: 6 January 1970 (age 56) Khabarovsk, Russian SFSR, Soviet Union

Sport
- Sport: Wrestling

Sergey Kovalevsky (born 6 January 1970) is a Belarusian wrestler. He competed in the men's freestyle 100 kg at the 1996 Summer Olympics.
