= Arawat Sabejew =

Soviet-German wrestler

Personal information
- Born: 24 September 1968 (age 57) Petropavl, Kazakh SSR, Soviet Union
- Height: 1.90 m (6 ft 3 in)
- Weight: 100 kg (220 lb)

Sport
- Sport: Wrestling
- Event: Freestyle
- Club: VfK Schifferstadt
- Coached by: Willi Heckmann; Sergej Sabejew
Medal record
Men's freestyle wrestling
Representing Germany
Olympic Games
Bronze medal – third place	1996 Atlanta	100 kg
World Championships
Gold medal – first place	1994 Istanbul	100 kg
Silver medal – second place	1995 Atlanta	100 kg
European Championships
Gold medal – first place	1993 Istanbul	100 kg
Silver medal – second place	2000 Budapest	97 kg
Bronze medal – third place	1995 Fribourg	100 kg
Bronze medal – third place	1997 Warsaw	97 kg
Representing the Soviet Union
European Championships
Gold medal – first place	1989 Ankara	100 kg
Gold medal – first place	1990 Poznan	100 kg

Arawat Sabejew (born 24 September 1968) is a Soviet-German Freestyle wrestler. He won a bronze medal at the 1996 Summer Olympics. Sabejew was also a two-time World Championships medalist, winning gold in 1994 and silver in 1995.
