= Byun Hye-young =

South Korean swimmer (born 1983)

Personal information
- National team: South Korea
- Born: 17 June 1983 (age 43) Seoul, South Korea
- Height: 1.66 m (5 ft 5 in)
- Weight: 61 kg (134 lb)

Korean name
- Hangul: 변혜영
- RR: Byeon Hyeyeong
- MR: Pyŏn Hyeyŏng

Sport
- Sport: Swimming
- Strokes: Breaststroke
- College team: Chungnam National University

Byun Hye-young (Korean: 변혜영; born June 17, 1983) is a South Korean former swimmer, who specialized in breaststroke events. She represented South Korea in two editions of the Olympic Games (1996 and 2000), and eventually became a top 20 finalist at the 2003 Summer Universiade in Daegu.

Byun made her Olympic debut, as South Korea's youngest ever swimmer in history (aged 13), at the 1996 Summer Olympics in Atlanta. She finished thirtieth place in the 100 m breaststroke, at 1:12.85. In the 4×100 m medley relay, Byun. along with Lee Ji-hyun, Park Woo-hee, and Lee Bo-eun, placed eighteenth from the prelims in 4:18.98.

At the 2000 Summer Olympics in Sydney, Byun competed only in the 100 m breaststroke. She achieved a FINA B-cut of 1:11.11 from the Dong-A Swimming Tournament in Ulsan. She challenged seven other swimmers in heat four, including top favorites Sarah Poewe of South Africa and Masami Tanaka of Japan. She rounded out the field to last place in 1:11.64, more than half a second (0.50) below her entry standard and 3.58 behind leader Poewe. Byun placed twenty-fifth overall in the prelims.

She was educated at Daejeon Daeheung Elementary School, Daejeon Girls' Middle School, Daejeon Physical Education High School, and Chungnam National University.
