= Konstantin Aleksandrov (wrestler) =

Kyrgyzstani wrestler

Konstantin Aleksandrov (born 10 October 1969) is a Kyrgyzstani former wrestler who competed in the 1996 Summer Olympics.
