= Sagid Murtazaliev =

Russian freestyle wrestler

Medal record

Men's freestyle wrestling

Representing Russia

Olympic Games
Gold medal – first place	2000 Sydney	97 kg

World Championships
Gold medal – first place	1999 Ankara	97 kg

Sagid Magomedovich Murtazaliev (Russian: Сагид Магомедович Муртазалиев; Avar: СагIид МагIамедович МуртазгIалиев; born 11 March 1974) is a Russian freestyle wrestler. Born in Makhachkala, Dagestan ASSR, Soviet Union and of Avar descent, Murtazaliev has won gold medals in heavyweight divisions at the 1999 FILA World Championships and the 2000 Summer Olympics.

== Olympics ==
Murtazaliev represented Ukraine at the 1996 Summer Olympics in Atlanta, and represented Russia at the 2000 Summer Olympics in Sydney, where he won gold in the men's freestyle 97 kg competition.

In 2013, he returned his medal to the IOC in protest of its vote to briefly drop wrestling from the Summer Olympic programme.

== Politics ==
In 2001, a bomb was found near Murtazaliev's home in Kizlyar. A charitable foundation is named after Sagid Murtazaliev. On April 12, 2010, Murtazaliev, who had been the head of Kizlyarsky District, became the head of the Dagestan branch of the Russian pension fund. Murtazaliev was a United Russia party deputy to the Legislative Assembly of the Republic of Dagestan. In 2015, the prosecution office opened a criminal case against Murtazaliev on financing terrorism as well as suspected him in relation to a number of murders. Murtazaliev left Russia and is currently wanted by the prosecution.

== Family ==
Sagid Murtazaliev is married with five children.
